= 2009 BMW PGA Championship =

Tournament information
- Dates: 21–24 May 2009
- Location: Virginia Water, Surrey, England; 51.40°N 0.59°W
- Courses: Wentworth Club; West Course
- Tour: European Tour

Statistics
- Par: 72
- Length: 7,304 yards (6,679 m)
- Field: 150 players, 78 after cut
- Cut: 146 (+2)
- Prize fund: €4,500,000
- Winner's share: €750,000

Champion
- (England) Paul Casey
- 271 (−17)

Location map
- Location in England Location in Surrey

The 2009 BMW PGA Championship was the 55th edition of the BMW PGA Championship, an annual professional golf tournament on the European Tour. It was held 21–24 May at the West Course of Wentworth Club in Virginia Water, Surrey, England, a suburb southwest of London.

Englishman Paul Casey won his first BMW PGA Championship with a one stroke victory over fellow Englishman Ross Fisher. This result saw him rise to Number 3 in the Official World Golf Rankings.

== Course layout ==
Wentworth Club, West Course
Tee	Rating/Slope	1	2	3	4	5	6	7	8	9	Out	10	11	12	13	14	15	16	17	18	In	Total
Yardage	n/a	474	154	465	552	203	418	396	392	449	3,503	184	416	531	470	179	489	383	610	539	3,801	7,304
Par		4	3	4	5	3	4	4	4	4	35	3	4	5	4	3	4	4	5	5	37	72

== Round summaries ==
=== First round ===
Thursday, 21 May 2009

Place	Player	Score	To par
T1	(Spain) Gonzalo Fernández-Castaño	67	−5
T1	(England) David Horsey	67	−5
T1	(England) Anthony Wall	67	−5
T4	(Sweden) Niclas Fasth	68	−4
T4	(England) Ross Fisher	68	−4
T4	(Spain) Miguel Ángel Jiménez	68	−4
T4	(England) Barry Lane	68	−4
T4	(South Africa) Charl Schwartzel	68	−4
T9	(England) Paul Casey	69	−3
T9	(United States) Ben Curtis	69	−3
T9	(Scotland) Scott Drummond	69	−3
T9	(United States) Anthony Kang	69	−3
T9	(Sweden) Robert Karlsson	69	−3
T9	(Denmark) Søren Kjeldsen	69	−3
T9	(Scotland) Colin Montgomerie	69	−3
T9	(Sweden) Alex Norén	69	−3
T9	(Spain) Álvaro Quirós	69	−3

=== Second round ===
Friday, 22 May 2009

Place	Player	Score	To par
1	(England) Paul Casey	69-67=136	−8
T2	(England) David Horsey	67-71=138	−6
T2	(Spain) Miguel Ángel Jiménez	68-70=138	−6
T2	(Denmark) Søren Kjeldsen	69-69=138	−6
T2	(England) Anthony Wall	67-71=138	−6
T2	(Scotland) Marc Warren	72-66=138	−6
T7	(South Africa) Thomas Aiken	72-67=139	−5
T7	(United States) Ben Curtis	69-70=139	−5
T7	(Wales) Stephen Dodd	71-68=139	−5
T10	(Spain) Pablo Larrazábal	73-67=140	−4
T10	(Sweden) Alex Norén	69-71=140	−4
T10	(Spain) Álvaro Quirós	69-71=140	−4
T10	(South Africa) Charl Schwartzel	68-72=140	−4

=== Third round ===
Saturday, 23 May 2009

Place	Player	Score	To par
1	(England) Paul Casey	69-67-67=203	−13
2	(Denmark) Søren Kjeldsen	69-69-68=206	−10
3	(Northern Ireland) Rory McIlroy	72-70-65=207	−9
T4	(England) Ross Fisher	68-73-67=208	−8
T4	(South Africa) Charl Schwartzel	68-72-68=208	−8
T6	(Wales) Stephen Dodd	71-68-70=209	−7
T6	(France) Thomas Levet	70-71-68=209	−7
T6	(Scotland) Marc Warren	72-66-71=209	−7
9	(England) Anthony Wall	67-71-72=210	−6
T10	(England) Nick Dougherty	73-71-67=211	−5
T10	(England) Simon Dyson	74-69-68=211	−5
T10	(Scotland) Colin Montgomerie	69-73-69=211	−5

=== Final round ===
Sunday, 24 May 2009

Place	Player	Score	To par	Money (€)
1	(England) Paul Casey	69-67-67-68=271	−17	750,000
2	(England) Ross Fisher	68-73-67-64=272	−16	500,000
3	(Denmark) Søren Kjeldsen	69-69-68-69=275	−13	281,700
4	(Wales) Stephen Dodd	71-68-70-67=276	−12	225,000
5	(Northern Ireland) Rory McIlroy	72-70-65-71=278	−10	190,800
T6	(United States) Ben Curtis	69-70-73-67=279	−9	135,000
T6	(South Africa) Charl Schwartzel	68-72-68-71=279	−9	135,000
T6	(England) Anthony Wall	67-71-72-69=279	−9	135,000
9	(France) Thomas Levet	70-71-68-71=280	−8	100,800
10	(South Africa) Thomas Aiken	72-67-74-68=281	−7	90,000
