= 2010 Ryder Cup =

2010 edition of the Ryder Cup

38th Ryder Cup Matches
- Dates: 1–4 October 2010
- Venue: Celtic Manor Resort; Twenty Ten Course
- Location: Newport, Wales
- Captains: Colin Montgomerie (Europe); Corey Pavin (USA)
(Europe)	14 1/2	13 1/2	(United States)
- Europe wins the Ryder Cup

Location map
- Location within Wales

The 38th Ryder Cup was held 1–4 October 2010 at the Celtic Manor Resort in Newport, Wales. It was the 17th time the Ryder Cup had been staged in Britain, but the first time in Wales. It was played on the newly constructed Twenty Ten course, specifically designed for the event. The team captains were Colin Montgomerie for Europe and Corey Pavin for the United States.

With the U.S. as the defending champion, Europe won by a score of 14 1/2 to 13 1/2 and regained the Cup. It was Europe's sixth victory in the last eight contests and their fourth consecutive home win. The event was plagued by bad weather with play having to be suspended twice. Having taken a 3-point lead into the singles matches Europe faced a U.S. fightback and the conclusion of the Ryder Cup 2010 went right down to the anchor match between Graeme McDowell and Hunter Mahan. Eventually McDowell defeated Mahan 3 & 1 to regain the Cup for Europe.

The competition was officially opened by Carwyn Jones, First Minister for Wales.

== Format ==
The Ryder Cup is a match play event, with each match worth one point. The original schedule in 2010 was:

- Day 1 (Friday) – 4 four-ball (better ball) matches in a morning session and 4 foursome (alternate shot) matches in an afternoon session
- Day 2 (Saturday) – 4 four-ball matches in a morning session and 4 foursome matches in an afternoon session
- Day 3 (Sunday) – 12 singles matches

With a total of 28 points, 14 1/2 points are required to win the Cup, and 14 points are required for the defending champion to retain the Cup. All matches were played to a maximum of 18 holes.

It was the second time in succession that the schedule for four-ball (better ball) and foursome (alternate shot) matches on Day One and Day Two has been changed, i.e. it was scheduled to be effectively the same timetable as was used in 2006.

== Revised format ==
As a result of the long suspension of play on the first day due to heavy rain, the format for the rest of the competition was changed to try to bring a conclusion to the matches on Sunday. However, further heavy rain caused a delayed start on Sunday, so that the last of the revised sessions would be played on Monday. Because of the changes, there were a number of Ryder Cup firsts. For the first time in the history of the Ryder Cup, all 24 players took part in pairing sessions at the same time in six pairings (as opposed to the usual four pairings) and in another first for the event both foursome and four-ball matches were played in the same session at the same time. It is also the first time that the competition went into a fourth day. The revised schedule consisted of four sessions as opposed to the usual five.

- Session One (Friday and Saturday) – 4 four-ball (better ball) matches
- Session Two (Saturday) – 6 foursome (alternate shot) matches
- Session Three (Saturday and Sunday) – 2 foursome and 4 four-ball matches
- Session Four (Monday) – 12 singles matches

The total number of each type of match remained the same, 8 four-ball, 8 foursomes, and 12 singles. By captains' agreement, matches would conclude at sundown Monday if not completed before then. Any matches still in progress would be considered halved at that point.

== Television ==
The matches were covered live domestically on Sky Sports with daily highlights shown on the BBC.

All matches were covered live in the United States, a first for a Ryder Cup in Europe. ESPN handled Friday coverage. Mike Tirico and Paul Azinger hosted from the 18th tower, with Curtis Strange, Peter Alliss, and Sean McDonough calling holes, and on-course reporters Andy North, Billy Kratzert and Judy Rankin. Scott Van Pelt and Tom Weiskopf handled recaps during coverage. Most of ESPN's coverage was rained out on Friday, with a 7-hour rain delay during the middle of the day. NBC Sports covered the weekend action, with Dan Hicks and Johnny Miller hosting from the 18th tower, Gary Koch calling holes, and on-course reporters Mark Rolfing, Roger Maltbie, and Dottie Pepper. USA Network aired coverage of the singles live on Monday morning. The coverage was produced by corporate sibling NBC, with NBC's announcers being used on the telecast.

== Team qualification and selection ==
=== Europe ===
The European team consisted of:

- The top four players on the Ryder Cup World Points List
  - Total points earned in Official World Golf Ranking events from 3 September 2009 to 22 August 2010, and thereafter only in the 2010 Johnnie Walker Championship at Gleneagles.
- The five players, not qualified above, on the Ryder Cup European Points List
  - Money earned in official European Tour events from 3 September 2009 to 29 August 2010
- Three captain's picks
  - The captain's picks were named on 29 August. In the previous the Ryder Cup had been two wildcard places on the European team, but on 12 May 2009 it was announced that this had been increased to three.

There was much discussion about the qualification process after leading players based primarily in the United States, such as Paul Casey and Justin Rose, failed to make the team. As a result, the priority of the European and World lists was switched for the 2012 Ryder Cup.

==== Final points standings ====
World points list
Position	Name	Points
1	Lee Westwood (Q)	422.01
2	Rory McIlroy (Q)	316.95
3	Martin Kaymer (Q)	285.42
4	Graeme McDowell (Q)	249.35
5	Edoardo Molinari (P)	248.41
6	Luke Donald (P)	231.16
7	Ian Poulter (q)	211.24
8	Pádraig Harrington (P)	204.97
9	Justin Rose	195.74
10	Francesco Molinari (q)	181.91
11	Miguel Ángel Jiménez (q)	171.21
12	Paul Casey	164.51
13	Peter Hanson (q)	158.87
14	Ross Fisher (q)	152.60
15	Rhys Davies	141.40
16	Robert Karlsson	141.28

European points list
Position	Name	Points
1	Lee Westwood (q)	3,446,137.87
2	Martin Kaymer (q)	2,638,282.58
3	Rory McIlroy (q)	2,368,205.11
4	Graeme McDowell (q)	2,307,041.47
5	Ian Poulter (Q)	2,238,874.06
6	Ross Fisher (Q)	1,732,537.57
7	Francesco Molinari (Q)	1,700,408.54
8	Miguel Ángel Jiménez (Q)	1,642,436.14
9	Peter Hanson (Q)	1,599,952.41
10	Edoardo Molinari (P)	1,542,828.32
11	Paul Casey	1,487,776.86
12	Pádraig Harrington (P)	1,486,529.63
13	Ross McGowan	1,414,157.79
14	Simon Dyson	1,367,083.58
15	Álvaro Quirós	1,296,413.04
16	Luke Donald (P)	1,290,803.61

Players in qualifying places (Q) are shown in green; captain's picks (P) are shown in yellow; those in italics (q) qualified through the other points list.

=== United States ===
The United States team consisted of:

- The top eight players on the Ryder Cup Points List
  - Points gained from money earned in majors in 2009 and official PGA tour events in 2010 up to 15 August (i.e. up to and including money earned at the 2010 PGA Championship). Money earned in 2010 majors counted double and money earned in 2010 events played opposite the majors or World Golf Championships counted half.
- Four captain's picks

The team was finalised on 7 September when the four wildcards were announced.

==== Final points standings ====
US Ryder Cup points list
Position	Name	Points
1	Phil Mickelson (Q)	6,095.063
2	Hunter Mahan (Q)	4,095.620
3	Bubba Watson (Q)	3,894.319
4	Jim Furyk (Q)	3,763.642
5	Steve Stricker (Q)	3,697.976
6	Dustin Johnson (Q)	3,573.804
7	Jeff Overton (Q)	3,533.148
8	Matt Kuchar (Q)	3,415.853
9	Anthony Kim	3,274.684
10	Lucas Glover	3,052.874
11	Zach Johnson (P)	3,051.897
12	Tiger Woods (P)	2,902.580
13	Bo Van Pelt	2,662.234
14	Stewart Cink (P)	2,644.833
15	Ben Crane	2,629.796
16	Ricky Barnes	2,610.171
17	Nick Watney	2,557.441
18	Sean O'Hair	2,417.574
19	J. B. Holmes	2,390.710
20	Rickie Fowler (P)	2,353.320

Players in the qualifying places (Q) are shown in green. Captains picks (P) are shown in yellow.

== Teams ==
=== Captains ===
The team captains were Colin Montgomerie for Europe and Corey Pavin for the USA.

=== Vice-captains ===
Each captain selected a number of vice-captains to assist him during the tournament and to advise the players on the course.

The European vice-captains were Thomas Bjørn, Darren Clarke, Sergio García, Paul McGinley and José María Olazábal. Olazábal was added as a fifth vice-captain during the tournament, when the revised format meant that there were not enough vice-captains to cover all six matches simultaneously.

The USA vice-captains were Paul Goydos, Tom Lehman, Davis Love III and Jeff Sluman.

=== Players ===
Team Europe
Name	Age	Residence	Points rank (World)	Points rank (European)	World ranking	Previous Ryder Cups	Matches	W–L–H	Winning percentage
(England) Lee Westwood	37	Worksop, England	1	1	3	6	29	14–10–5	56.90
(Northern Ireland) Rory McIlroy	21	Holywood, Northern Ireland	2	3	9	0	Rookie
(Germany) Martin Kaymer	25	Mettmann, Germany	3	2	6	0	Rookie
(Northern Ireland) Graeme McDowell	31	Portrush, Northern Ireland	4	4	13	1	4	2–1–1	62.50
(England) Ian Poulter	34	Milton Keynes, England	7	5	16	2	7	5–2–0	71.43
(England) Ross Fisher	29	Cheam, England	14	6	27	0	Rookie
(Italy) Francesco Molinari	27	Turin, Italy	10	7	32	0	Rookie
(Spain) Miguel Ángel Jiménez	46	Málaga, Spain	11	8	26	3	12	2–7–3	29.17
(Sweden) Peter Hanson	32	Trelleborg, Sweden	13	9	42	0	Rookie
(Italy) Edoardo Molinari	29	Turin, Italy	5	10	15	0	Rookie
(England) Luke Donald	32	High Wycombe, England	6	16	8	2	7	5–1–1	78.57
(Republic of Ireland) Pádraig Harrington	39	Dublin, Ireland	8	12	22	5	21	7–11–3	40.48

Captains picks are shown in yellow; the world rankings and records are at the start of the 2010 Ryder Cup. Peter Hanson celebrated his 33rd birthday on the final day.

Team USA
Name	Age	Residence	Points rank	World ranking	Previous Ryder Cups	Matches	W–L–H	Winning percentage
Phil Mickelson	40	Rancho Santa Fe, California	1	2	7	30	10–14–6	43.33
Hunter Mahan	28	Plano, Texas	2	14	1	5	2–0–3	70.00
Bubba Watson	31	Bagdad, Florida	3	24	0	Rookie
Jim Furyk	40	Ponte Vedra Beach, Florida	4	5	6	24	8–13–3	39.58
Steve Stricker	43	Madison, Wisconsin	5	4	1	3	0–2–1	16.67
Dustin Johnson	26	Myrtle Beach, South Carolina	6	12	0	Rookie
Jeff Overton	27	Bloomington, Indiana	7	48	0	Rookie
Matt Kuchar	32	Ponte Vedra Beach, Florida	8	11	0	Rookie
Zach Johnson	34	Lake Mary, Florida	11	19	1	4	1–2–1	37.50
Tiger Woods	34	Windermere, Florida	12	1	5	25	10–13–2	44.00
Stewart Cink	37	Duluth, Georgia	14	35	4	15	4–7–4	40.00
Rickie Fowler	21	Las Vegas, Nevada	20	33	0	Rookie

Captains picks are shown in yellow; the world rankings and records are at the start of the 2010 Ryder Cup.

== Session 1 (Friday and Saturday) ==
=== Four-ball ===
	Results
Westwood/Kaymer	(Europe) 3 & 2	Mickelson/D. Johnson
McIlroy/McDowell	halved	Cink/Kuchar
Poulter/Fisher	(United States) 2 up	Stricker/Woods
Donald/Harrington	(United States) 3 & 2	Watson/Overton
1 1/2	Session	2 1/2
1 1/2	Overall	2 1/2

Four-balls play on Friday began on schedule but was suspended at 9:43 am BST due to poor course conditions because of rain. Play was resumed at 5:00 pm as the water had drained off the course but was suspended again for the day just after 7 pm BST. Play was completed Saturday morning.

== Session 2 (Saturday) ==
=== Foursomes ===
	Results
Jiménez/Hanson	(United States) 4 & 3	Woods/Stricker
Molinari/Molinari	(United States) 2 up	Z. Johnson/Mahan
Westwood/Kaymer	halved	Furyk/Fowler
Harrington/Fisher	(Europe) 3 & 2	Mickelson/D. Johnson
Poulter/Donald	(Europe) 2 & 1	Watson/Overton
McDowell/McIlroy	(United States) 1 up	Cink/Kuchar
2 1/2	Session	3 1/2
4	Overall	6

In order to fit the intended number of matches into a schedule that had been condensed due to the weather, three sessions of four matches each were converted into 2 sessions of 6 matches each, requiring all 24 players to play during Sessions 2 and 3.

== Session 3 (Saturday and Sunday) ==
=== Foursomes ===
	Results
Donald/Westwood	(Europe) 6 & 5	Stricker/Woods
McDowell/McIlroy	(Europe) 3 & 1	Z. Johnson/Mahan

=== Four-ball ===
	Results
Harrington/Fisher	(Europe) 2 & 1	Furyk/D. Johnson
Hanson/Jiménez	(Europe) 2 up	Watson/Overton
Molinari/Molinari	halved	Cink/Kuchar
Poulter/Kaymer	(Europe) 2 & 1	Mickelson/Fowler
5 1/2	Session	1/2
9 1/2	Overall	6 1/2

Play began in the third session on late Saturday afternoon. Team Europe was leading all six matches when darkness halted play. Start of play on Sunday was delayed until 13:20, due to severe weather overnight leaving running water on the fairways again.

== Session 4 (Monday) ==
- For the first time in Ryder Cup history, the final session was conducted on a Monday, due to torrential rain on the first day which delayed the schedule.

=== Singles ===
	Results		Timetable
Lee Westwood	(United States) 2 & 1	Steve Stricker	1st: 9 1/2 - 7 1/2
Rory McIlroy	halved	Stewart Cink	4th: 11 - 9
Luke Donald	(Europe) 1 up	Jim Furyk	5th: 12 - 9
Martin Kaymer	(United States) 6 & 4	Dustin Johnson	2nd: 9 1/2 - 8 1/2
Ian Poulter	(Europe) 5 & 4	Matt Kuchar	3rd: 10 1/2 - 8 1/2
Ross Fisher	(United States) 3 & 2	Jeff Overton	7th: 13 - 10
Miguel Ángel Jiménez	(Europe) 4 & 3	Bubba Watson	6th: 13 - 9
Francesco Molinari	(United States) 4 & 3	Tiger Woods	8th: 13 - 11
Edoardo Molinari	halved	Rickie Fowler	10th: 13 1/2 - 12 1/2
Peter Hanson	(United States) 4 & 2	Phil Mickelson	9th: 13 - 12
Pádraig Harrington	(United States) 3 & 2	Zach Johnson	11th: 13 1/2 - 13 1/2
Graeme McDowell	(Europe) 3 & 1	Hunter Mahan	12th: 14 1/2 - 13 1/2
5	Session	7
14 1/2	Overall	13 1/2

== Individual player records ==
Each entry refers to the win–loss–half record of the player.

=== Europe ===
Player	Points	Overall	Singles	Foursomes	Fourballs
Luke Donald	3	3–1–0	1–0–0	2–0–0	0–1–0
Ross Fisher	2	2–2–0	0–1–0	1–0–0	1–1–0
Peter Hanson	1	1–2–0	0–1–0	0–1–0	1–0–0
Pádraig Harrington	2	2–2–0	0–1–0	1–0–0	1–1–0
Miguel Ángel Jiménez	2	2–1–0	1–0–0	0–1–0	1–0–0
Martin Kaymer	2.5	2–1–1	0–1–0	0–0–1	2–0–0
Graeme McDowell	2.5	2–1–1	1–0–0	1–1–0	0–0–1
Rory McIlroy	2	1–1–2	0–0–1	1–1–0	0–0–1
Edoardo Molinari	1	0–1–2	0–0–1	0–1–0	0–0–1
Francesco Molinari	0.5	0–2–1	0–1–0	0–1–0	0–0–1
Ian Poulter	3	3–1–0	1–0–0	1–0–0	1–1–0
Lee Westwood	2.5	2–1–1	0–1–0	1–0–1	1–0–0

=== United States ===
Player	Points	Overall	Singles	Foursomes	Fourballs
Stewart Cink	2.5	1–0–3	0–0–1	1–0–0	0–0–2
Rickie Fowler	1	0–1–2	0–0–1	0–0–1	0–1–0
Jim Furyk	0.5	0–2–1	0–1–0	0–0–1	0–1–0
Dustin Johnson	1	1–3–0	1–0–0	0–1–0	0–2–0
Zach Johnson	2	2–1–0	1–0–0	1–1–0	0–0–0
Matt Kuchar	2	1–1–2	0–1–0	1–0–0	0–0–2
Hunter Mahan	1	1–2–0	0–1–0	1–1–0	0–0–0
Phil Mickelson	1	1–3–0	1–0–0	0–1–0	0–2–0
Jeff Overton	2	2–2–0	1–0–0	0–1–0	1–1–0
Steve Stricker	3	3–1–0	1–0–0	1–1–0	1–0–0
Bubba Watson	1	1–3–0	0–1–0	0–1–0	1–1–0
Tiger Woods	3	3–1–0	1–0–0	1–1–0	1–0–0

== Opening concert ==
Welcome to Wales logo

A concert, dubbed 'Welcome to Wales', was held at the Millennium Stadium in Cardiff on 29 September 2010, two days prior to the beginning of the Ryder Cup. The event replaced a planned traditional gala dinner and was introduced by celebrities and golf stars. The concert featured musical performances by international superstars, and was hosted by Steve Jones.

The concert was headlined by Lostprophets, with Shirley Bassey, Katherine Jenkins, Catherine Zeta-Jones and Only Men Aloud! also featuring in the 90-minute televised event. The European and US golfers appeared on stage to greet the audience. It marked Bassey's first appearance in Wales for over 5 years.

== Awards ==
In December 2010, BBC Sport named the Europe squad "Team of The Year".
