= 2009 Volvo World Match Play Championship =

Tournament information
- Dates: 29 October – 1 November
- Location: Andalusia, Spain
- Course: Finca Cortesín Golf Club
- Tour: European Tour
- Format: Match play – 18 holes (36-hole semi-finals and final)

Statistics
- Par: 72
- Length: 7,439 yards (6,802 m)
- Field: 16 players
- Prize fund: €3,250,000
- Winner's share: €750,000

Champion
- (England) Ross Fisher
- def. Anthony Kim 4 & 3

The 2009 Volvo World Match Play Championship was the 45th Volvo World Match Play Championship played, the first for two years and the first time at Finca Cortesín Golf Club. It was held from 29 October to 1 November, with the champion receiving €750,000. A new format was introduced, with the sixteen players split into four groups of four, with the winner of each group progressing to the semi-finals. Once again it was an official money event on the European Tour.

== Qualification ==
1. Defending champion (Ernie Els is not taking part):

- Rory McIlroy

2. Winner of the 2009 Volvo China Open

- Scott Strange

3. The leading player, based upon their nationality, listed on the Official World Golf Ranking, from each of the following regions:

- Europe - Paul Casey
- Africa/Middle East - Retief Goosen
- North America - Anthony Kim
- South America - Camilo Villegas
- Asia - Jeev Milkha Singh
- Australasia - Robert Allenby

4. The leading four players (not otherwise qualified) from the Official World Golf Rankings

- Henrik Stenson
- Sergio García
- Lee Westwood
- Martin Kaymer

5. The leading four players (not otherwise qualified) from the Race to Dubai

- Ross Fisher
- Ángel Cabrera
- Simon Dyson
- Oliver Wilson

Substitutions were made from various sources.

== Course ==
| | 1 | 2 | 3 | 4 | 5 | 6 | 7 | 8 | 9 | Out | 10 | 11 | 12 | 13 | 14 | 15 | 16 | 17 | 18 | In | Total |
| Metres | 431 | 218 | 495 | 305 | 526 | 205 | 452 | 525 | 322 | 3,479 | 207 | 573 | 205 | 378 | 323 | 480 | 424 | 162 | 519 | 3,271 | 6,750 |
| Par | 4 | 3 | 5 | 4 | 5 | 3 | 4 | 5 | 4 | 37 | 3 | 5 | 3 | 4 | 4 | 4 | 4 | 3 | 5 | 35 | 72 |

== Format ==
The sixteen players were split into four groups of four, seeded by their World Ranking. Within each group, every player played each other in a round robin format over full 18-hole matches. Each match completed the full 18 holes. Points were awarded based upon win (2), tie (1) or loss (0). The leading player from each group qualified for the semi-final knockout stage. In case of ties, aggregate number of holes won were used to determine the winner.

The semi-finals and finals were played over 36 holes.

== Group stages ==
=== Results ===
Seve Ballesteros group
| Name | PC | RG | AK | SS |
|---|---|---|---|---|
| Paul Casey | – | 1dn | 3dn | 1dn |
| Retief Goosen | 1up | – | 4dn | 1up |
| Anthony Kim | 3up | 4up | – | 3dn |
| Scott Strange | 1up | 1dn | 3up | – |

Mark McCormack group
| Name | SG | MK | RA | OW |
|---|---|---|---|---|
| Sergio García | – | 4up | A/S | 1dn |
| Martin Kaymer | 4dn | – | 1dn | 1dn |
| Robert Allenby | A/S | 1up | – | 2up |
| Oliver Wilson | 1up | 1up | 2dn | – |

Gustav Larson group
| Name | HS | RM | AC | SD |
|---|---|---|---|---|
| Henrik Stenson | – | 4dn | 2up | 3dn |
| Rory McIlroy | 4up | – | 5dn | 2up |
| Ángel Cabrera | 2dn | 5up | – | 7up |
| Simon Dyson | 3up | 2dn | 7dn | – |

Assar Gabrielsson group
| Name | LW | CV | RF | JMS |
|---|---|---|---|---|
| Lee Westwood | – | A/S | 2up | 6dn |
| Camilo Villegas | A/S | – | 2dn | 3up |
| Ross Fisher | 2dn | 2up | – | 1up |
| Jeev Milkha Singh | 6up | 3dn | 1dn | – |

=== Standings ===
Seve Ballesteros
| Player | Seed | W | L | T | H(+/−) | Pts |
|---|---|---|---|---|---|---|
| Anthony Kim | 9 | 2 | 1 | 0 | 4 | 4 |
| Scott Strange | 16 | 2 | 1 | 0 | 3 | 4 |
| Retief Goosen | 8 | 2 | 1 | 0 | −2 | 4 |
| Paul Casey | 1 | 0 | 3 | 0 | −5 | 0 |

Mark McCormack
| Player | Seed | W | L | T | H(+/−) | Pts |
|---|---|---|---|---|---|---|
| Robert Allenby | 12 | 2 | 0 | 1 | 3 | 5 |
| Oliver Wilson | 13 | 2 | 1 | 0 | 0 | 4 |
| Sergio García | 4 | 1 | 1 | 1 | 3 | 3 |
| Martin Kaymer | 5 | 0 | 3 | 0 | −6 | 0 |

Gustav Larson
| Player | Seed | W | L | T | H(+/−) | Pts |
|---|---|---|---|---|---|---|
| Ángel Cabrera | 11 | 2 | 1 | 0 | 10 | 4 |
| Rory McIlroy | 6 | 2 | 1 | 0 | 1 | 4 |
| Henrik Stenson | 3 | 1 | 2 | 0 | −5 | 2 |
| Simon Dyson | 14 | 1 | 2 | 0 | −6 | 2 |

Assar Gabrielsson
| Player | Seed | W | L | T | H(+/−) | Pts |
|---|---|---|---|---|---|---|
| Ross Fisher | 10 | 2 | 1 | 0 | 1 | 4 |
| Camilo Villegas | 7 | 1 | 1 | 1 | 1 | 3 |
| Lee Westwood | 2 | 1 | 1 | 1 | −4 | 3 |
| Jeev Milkha Singh | 15 | 1 | 2 | 0 | 2 | 2 |

== Final four ==
Semi-finals; 31 October
(United States) Anthony Kim | 5&4
(Australia) Robert Allenby
(Argentina) Ángel Cabrera
(England) Ross Fisher | 39 h

Final; 1 November
(United States) Anthony Kim
(England) Ross Fisher | 4&3
Third place 1 November
(Australia) Robert Allenby | 19 h
(Argentina) Ángel Cabrera

== Prize money breakdown ==
| Place | Actual prize fund (€) | Race to Dubai fund (€) | World Money List fund (US$) |
|---|---|---|---|
| Champion | 750,000 | 541,667 | 775,694 |
| Runner-up | 450,000 | 361,108 | 517,124 |
| Third place | 250,000 | 203,450 | 291,350 |
| Fourth place | 200,000 | 162,500 | 232,708 |
| Runner-ip in group x 4 | 150,000 | 107,575 | 154,053 |
| Third place in group x 4 | 130,000 | 63,375 | 90,756 |
| Fourth place in group x 4 | 120,000 | 8,913 | 70,046 |
| Total | €3,250,000 | €1,488,588 | $2,131,731 |
