= 2006 European Tour =

Golf tour season

2006 European Tour season
- Duration: 10 November 2005 – 29 October 2006
- Number of official events: 47
- Most wins: (England) Paul Casey (3) (Note: Tiger Woods won five events, but was not a European Tour member.) (Sweden) Johan Edfors (3)
- Order of Merit: (Republic of Ireland) Pádraig Harrington
- Golfer of the Year: (England) Paul Casey
- Sir Henry Cotton Rookie of the Year: (Scotland) Marc Warren

The 2006 European Tour was the 35th season of the European Tour, the main professional golf tour in Europe since its inaugural season in 1972.

== Changes for 2006 ==
Changes from the 2005 season included four new tournaments, the HSBC Champions in China, the Abu Dhabi Golf Championship, the BA-CA Golf Open, which returned to the European Tour schedule for the first time since 1996, and the Royal Trophy, a team event contested between teams from Europe and Asia. In addition, there were two editions of the Volvo China Open and the Imperial Collection Russian Open became a full European Tour event having previously been a dual-ranking event with the Challenge Tour. The German Masters, the Heineken Classic, and the Abama Open de Canarias were lost from the tour schedule, as was the New Zealand Open which was held later in the year as part of the 2007 season.

== Schedule ==
The following table lists official events during the 2006 season.

| Date | Tournament | Host country | Purse | Winner (Note: The number in brackets after each winner's name is the number of European Tour events they had won up to and including that tournament. This information is only shown for European Tour members and are inclusive of the three United States-based major championships which were included on the schedule for the first time in 1998, with earlier editions having retrospectively been recognised as official tour wins.) | OWGR points | Other tours (Note: AFR − Sunshine Tour; ANZ − PGA Tour of Australasia; ASA − Asian Tour; CHA − Challenge Tour.) | Notes |
|---|---|---|---|---|---|---|---|
| 13 Nov | HSBC Champions | China | US$5,000,000 | (England) David Howell (3) | 48 | AFR, (Note: Sunshine Tour unofficial event) ANZ, (Note: PGA Tour of Australasia unofficial event) ASA (Note: Asian Tour unofficial event) | New limited-field event |
| 27 Nov | Volvo China Open | China | US$1,300,000 | (England) Paul Casey (5) | 18 | ASA | |
| 4 Dec | UBS Hong Kong Open | Hong Kong | US$1,200,000 | (Scotland) Colin Montgomerie (30) | 28 | ASA | |
| 11 Dec | Dunhill Championship | South Africa | €1,000,000 | (South Africa) Ernie Els (22) | 20 | AFR | |
| 18 Dec | South African Airways Open | South Africa | €1,000,000 | (South Africa) Retief Goosen (13) | 32 | AFR (Note: Sunshine Tour flagship event) | |
| 22 Jan | Abu Dhabi Golf Championship | UAE | US$2,000,000 | (United States) Chris DiMarco (n/a) | 42 | | New tournament |
| 29 Jan | Commercialbank Qatar Masters | Qatar | US$2,000,000 | (Sweden) Henrik Stenson (3) | 44 | ASA | |
| 5 Feb | Dubai Desert Classic | UAE | US$2,400,000 | (United States) Tiger Woods (n/a) | 48 | | |
| 12 Feb | Johnnie Walker Classic | Australia | £1,250,000 | (United States) Kevin Stadler (n/a) | 44 | ANZ, ASA | |
| 19 Feb | Maybank Malaysian Open | Malaysia | US$1,250,000 | (South Korea) Charlie Wi (1) | 20 | ASA | |
| 26 Feb | WGC-Accenture Match Play Championship | United States | US$7,500,000 | (Australia) Geoff Ogilvy (1) | 76 | | World Golf Championship |
| 5 Mar | Enjoy Jakarta HSBC Indonesia Open | Indonesia | US$1,000,000 | (England) Simon Dyson (1) | 20 | ASA | |
| 12 Mar | OSIM Singapore Masters | Singapore | US$1,000,000 | (Singapore) Mardan Mamat (1) | 20 | ASA | |
| 19 Mar | TCL Classic | China | US$1,000,000 | (Sweden) Johan Edfors (1) | 24 | ASA | |
| 26 Mar | Madeira Island Open Caixa Geral de Depositos | Portugal | €700,000 | (France) Jean van de Velde (2) | 24 | | |
| 2 Apr | Algarve Open de Portugal | Portugal | €1,250,000 | (England) Paul Broadhurst (6) | 24 | | |
| 9 Apr | Masters Tournament | United States | US$7,000,000 | (United States) Phil Mickelson (n/a) | 100 | | Major championship |
| 16 Apr | Volvo China Open | China | US$1,800,000 | (India) Jeev Milkha Singh (1) | 24 | ASA | |
| 23 Apr | BMW Asian Open | China | US$1,800,000 | (Spain) Gonzalo Fernández-Castaño (2) | 30 | ASA | |
| 30 Apr | Andalucía Open de España Valle Romano | Spain | €1,650,000 | (Sweden) Niclas Fasth (4) | 24 | | |
| 7 May | Telecom Italia Open | Italy | €1,400,000 | (Italy) Francesco Molinari (1) | 24 | | |
| 14 May | Quinn Direct British Masters | England | £1,800,000 | (Sweden) Johan Edfors (2) | 42 | | |
| 21 May | Nissan Irish Open | Ireland | €2,200,000 | (Denmark) Thomas Bjørn (9) | 38 | | |
| 28 May | BMW Championship | England | €4,250,000 | (England) David Howell (4) | 64 | | Flagship event |
| 4 Jun | Celtic Manor Wales Open | Wales | £1,500,000 | (Sweden) Robert Karlsson (6) | 28 | | |
| 11 Jun | BA-CA Golf Open | Austria | €1,300,000 | (Austria) Markus Brier (1) | 24 | | |
| 18 Jun | Aa St Omer Open | France | €400,000 | (Argentina) César Monasterio (1) | 18 | CHA | |
| 18 Jun | U.S. Open | United States | US$6,250,000 | (Australia) Geoff Ogilvy (2) | 100 | | Major championship |
| 25 Jun | Johnnie Walker Championship at Gleneagles | Scotland | £1,400,000 | (England) Paul Casey (6) | 24 | | |
| 2 Jul | Open de France Alstom | France | €4,000,000 | (England) John Bickerton (2) | 40 | | |
| 9 Jul | Smurfit Kappa European Open | Ireland | £2,400,000 | (Wales) Stephen Dodd (3) | 46 | | |
| 16 Jul | Barclays Scottish Open | Scotland | £2,400,000 | (Sweden) Johan Edfors (3) | 50 | | |
| 23 Jul | The Open Championship | England | £4,000,000 | (United States) Tiger Woods (n/a) | 100 | | Major championship |
| 30 Jul | Deutsche Bank Players Championship of Europe | Germany | €3,600,000 | (Sweden) Robert Karlsson (7) | 50 | | |
| 6 Aug | EnterCard Scandinavian Masters | Sweden | €1,600,000 | (Scotland) Marc Warren (1) | 24 | | |
| 13 Aug | KLM Open | Netherlands | €1,600,000 | (England) Simon Dyson (2) | 24 | | |
| 20 Aug | Imperial Collection Russian Open | Russia | US$1,000,000 | (Spain) Alejandro Cañizares (1) | 24 | | |
| 20 Aug | PGA Championship | United States | US$6,800,000 | (United States) Tiger Woods (n/a) | 100 | | Major championship |
| 27 Aug | WGC-Bridgestone Invitational | United States | US$7,500,000 | (United States) Tiger Woods (n/a) | 76 | | World Golf Championship |
| 3 Sep | BMW International Open | Germany | €2,000,000 | (Sweden) Henrik Stenson (4) | 44 | | |
| 10 Sep | Omega European Masters | Switzerland | €2,000,000 | (Wales) Bradley Dredge (2) | 24 | | |
| 17 Sep | HSBC World Match Play Championship | England | £1,660,000 | (England) Paul Casey (7) | 48 | | Limited-field event |
| 17 Sep | XXXII Banco Madrid Valle Romano; Open de Madrid Golf Masters | Spain | €1,000,000 | (England) Ian Poulter (7) | 24 | | |
| 1 Oct | WGC-American Express Championship | England | US$7,500,000 | (United States) Tiger Woods (n/a) | 70 | | World Golf Championship |
| 8 Oct | Alfred Dunhill Links Championship | Scotland | US$5,000,000 | (Republic of Ireland) Pádraig Harrington (10) | 50 | | Pro-Am |
| 22 Oct | Mallorca Classic | Spain | €1,750,000 | (Sweden) Niclas Fasth (5) | 28 | | |
| 29 Oct | Volvo Masters | Spain | €4,000,000 | (India) Jeev Milkha Singh (2) | 48 | | Tour Championship |

=== Unofficial events ===
The following events were sanctioned by the European Tour, but did not carry official money, nor were wins official.

| Date | Tournament | Host country | Purse | Winners | OWGR points | Notes |
|---|---|---|---|---|---|---|
| 8 Jan | Royal Trophy | Thailand | US$1,250,000 | Team Europe | n/a | New team event |
| 24 Sep | Ryder Cup | Ireland | n/a | Team Europe | n/a | Team event |
| 10 Dec | WGC-World Cup | Barbados | US$4,000,000 | (Germany) Bernhard Langer and (Germany) Marcel Siem | n/a | World Golf Championship; Team event |

== Order of Merit ==
The Order of Merit was based on prize money won during the season, calculated in Euros.

| Position | Player | Prize money (€) |
|---|---|---|
| 1 | (Republic of Ireland) Pádraig Harrington | 2,489,337 |
| 2 | (England) Paul Casey | 2,454,084 |
| 3 | (England) David Howell | 2,321,116 |
| 4 | (Sweden) Robert Karlsson | 2,044,936 |
| 5 | (South Africa) Ernie Els | 1,716,208 |
| 6 | (Sweden) Henrik Stenson | 1,709,359 |
| 7 | (England) Luke Donald | 1,658,060 |
| 8 | (England) Ian Poulter | 1,589,070 |
| 9 | (Scotland) Colin Montgomerie | 1,534,748 |
| 10 | (Sweden) Johan Edfors | 1,505,583 |

== Awards ==
| Award | Winner | Ref. |
|---|---|---|
| Golfer of the Year | (England) Paul Casey | |
| Sir Henry Cotton Rookie of the Year | (Scotland) Marc Warren | |

== See also ==
- 2006 in golf
- 2006 European Seniors Tour
