= Wales Open =

Coordinates: 51.603°N 2.933°W

Cazoo Open

Tournament information
- Location: Newport, Wales
- Established: 2000
- Courses: Celtic Manor Resort (Twenty-Ten Course)
- Par: 71
- Length: 7,393 yards (6,760 m)
- Tour: European Tour
- Format: Stroke play
- Prize fund: €1,750,000
- Month played: August
- Final year: 2022

Tournament record score
- Aggregate: 260 Robert Karlsson (2006)
- To par: −22 Scott Strange (2008)

Final champion
- (England) Callum Shinkwin
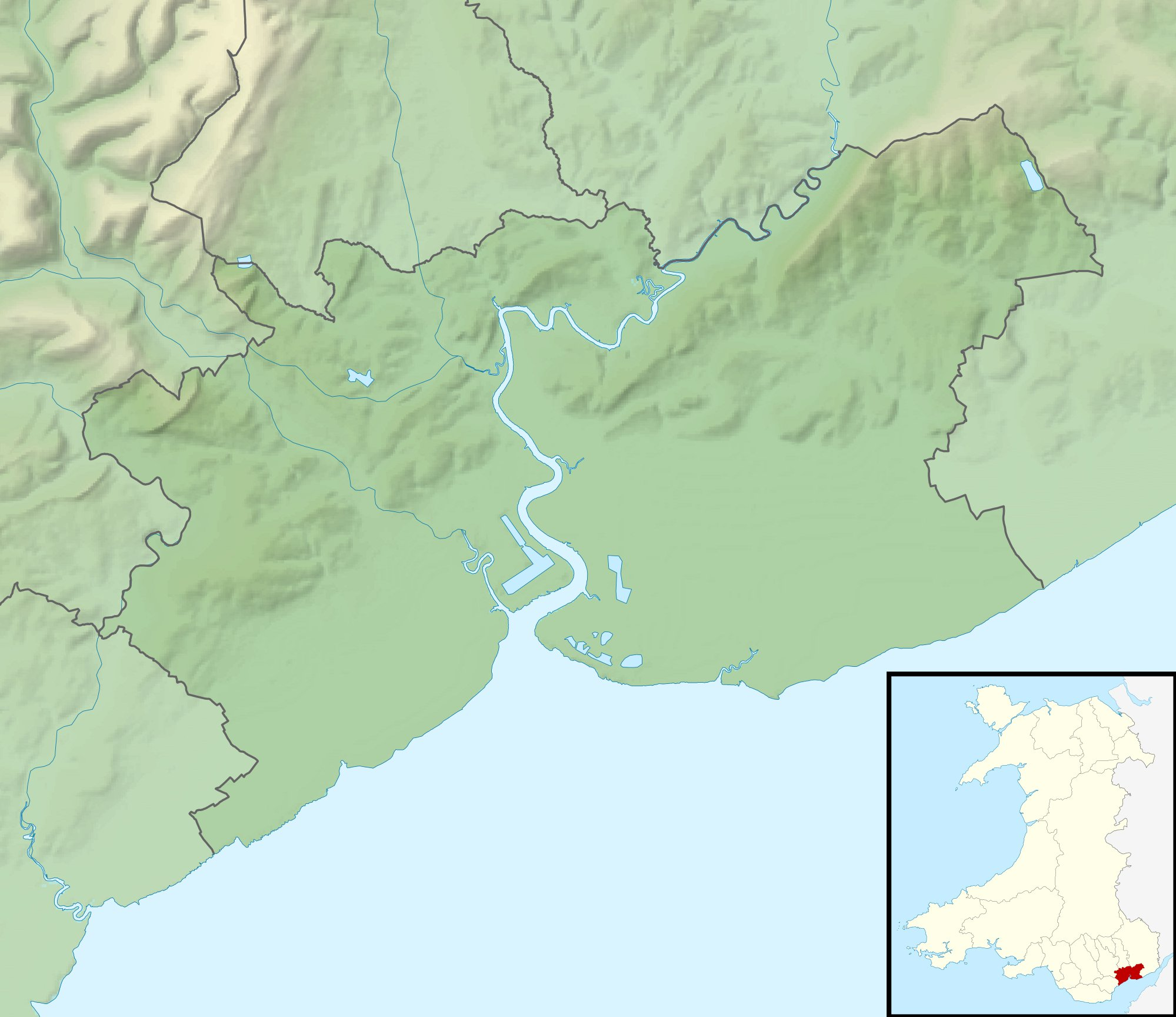
- Location in Wales Location in Newport

The Wales Open was a professional golf tournament on the European Tour played at the Celtic Manor Resort. It was played annually from 2000 to 2014, as part of a 15-year deal between the tour and the Celtic Manor Resort, that included staging the 2010 Ryder Cup. The event was not held from 2015 to 2019 but returned in 2020, following a revamp of the European Tour because of the COVID-19 pandemic.

== History ==
The 2001 event was reduced to 36 holes because of heavy rain. The third round was cancelled but organisers had hoped to play a third round on the Sunday. However, that was not possible and the result was decided over the first two rounds. Paul McGinley, Paul Lawrie and Daren Lee were tied at 6-under-par and a playoff was arranged on 12th hole, a par 3, which would be played repeatedly until a winner emerged. Lawrie dropped out of the playoff when he bogeyed the hole at the second attempt, McGinley eventually winning when Lee bogeyed the hole at the fifth try.

There was another playoff in 2004 when Paul Casey and Simon Khan tied on 267, 21-under-par. Casey had a bogey six at the second playoff hole after which Khan holed a 3-foot putt for birdie.

In 2006, Robert Karlsson broke the European Tour's 36-hole and 54-hole scoring records by scoring 124 for the first two rounds and 189 for the first three. However, as the Roman Road course was a par-69, rare at the professional level, his scores relative to par were a slightly less remarkable 14-under after two rounds and 18-under after three. Karlsson shot two-over-par for the final round, but still won. In the same year, Phillip Archer scored 60 in the first round, missing a birdie putt on the 18th green.

== Sponsorship ==
The event started in 2000 as part of a 15-year deal between the European Tour and the Celtic Manor Resort, that included staging the 2010 Ryder Cup. It was originally known as the Celtic Manor Resort Wales Open, becoming the Celtic Manor Wales Open in 2004.

The 2011 event was called the Saab Wales Open under a one-year deal with Saab. From 2012 to 2014, the event became the ISPS Handa Wales Open, with ISPS Handa as the title sponsor, and an initial prize fund in 2012 of £1.8 million. The event was dropped after 2014.

The tournament returned in 2020 as part of a revamp of the European Tour's schedule in response to the impact of the COVID-19 pandemic. The event was the fifth event of a 6-week "UK Swing" and was again hosted at Celtic Manor and sponsored by ISPS Handa, although with reduced prize money of €1,000,000.

The 2021 event was sponsored by Cazoo as part of a multi-year sponsorship deal which also included the English Open. The event was also backed by international footballer Gareth Bale and called the Cazoo Open supported by Gareth Bale.

== Course ==
The event has always been played at Celtic Manor in Newport, Wales. From 2000 to 2004 it was played on the Wentwood Hills course. While that course was being redeveloped for the 2010 Ryder Cup, the Wales Open was played from 2005 to 2007 on the par-69 Roman Road course. From 2008, the event has been played on the Ryder Cup Twenty-Ten course.

The 2021 course layout, at the Twenty-Ten Course

Hole	1	2	3	4	5	6	7	8	9	Out	10	11	12	13	14	15	16	17	18	In	Total
Yards	465	610	189	462	433	452	213	439	580	3,843	210	562	458	189	413	377	477	211	575	3,472	7,315
Metres	425	558	173	422	396	413	195	401	530	3,513	192	514	419	173	378	345	436	193	526	3,176	6,689
Par	4	5	3	4	4	4	3	4	5	36	3	5	4	3	4	4	4	3	5	35	71

== Winners ==
Year	Winner	Score	To par	Margin of victory	Runner(s)-up	Purse (Note: Before 2020 the prize fund was always stated and paid in Pound sterling (£). Since 2020 the prize fund has been stated and paid in Euro (€).)	Winner's share
Cazoo Open
2022	(England) Callum Shinkwin	272	−12	4 strokes	(Scotland) Connor Syme	1,750,000	297,500
2021	(Spain) Nacho Elvira	268	−16	Playoff	(South Africa) Justin Harding	1,250,000	191,570
ISPS Handa Wales Open
2020	(France) Romain Langasque	276	−8	2 strokes	(Finland) Sami Välimäki	1,000,000	156,825
2015−2019: No tournament
2014	(Netherlands) Joost Luiten	270	−14	1 stroke	(England) Tommy Fleetwood (Republic of Ireland) Shane Lowry	1,800,000	300,000
2013	(France) Grégory Bourdy	276	−8	2 strokes	(United States) Peter Uihlein	1,800,000	300,000
2012	(Thailand) Thongchai Jaidee	278	−6	1 stroke	(Denmark) Thomas Bjørn (Spain) Gonzalo Fernández-Castaño (Netherlands) Joost Luiten (South Africa) Richard Sterne	1,800,000	300,000
Saab Wales Open
2011	(Sweden) Alex Norén	275	−9	2 strokes	(France) Grégory Bourdy (Denmark) Anders Hansen	1,800,000	300,000
Celtic Manor Wales Open
2010	(Northern Ireland) Graeme McDowell	269	−15	3 strokes	(Wales) Rhys Davies	1,800,000	300,000
2009	(Denmark) Jeppe Huldahl	275	−9	1 stroke	(Sweden) Niclas Fasth	1,800,000	300,000
2008	(Australia) Scott Strange	262	−22	4 strokes	(Sweden) Robert Karlsson	1,800,000	300,000
2007	(South Africa) Richard Sterne	263	−13	1 stroke	(Wales) Bradley Dredge (Denmark) Søren Kjeldsen (Singapore) Mardan Mamat (Denmark) Mads Vibe-Hastrup	1,500,000	250,000
2006	(Sweden) Robert Karlsson	260	−16	3 strokes	(England) Paul Broadhurst	1,500,000	250,000
2005	(Spain) Miguel Ángel Jiménez	262	−14	4 strokes	(Sweden) Martin Erlandsson (Spain) José Manuel Lara	1,500,000	250,000
2004	(England) Simon Khan	267	−21	Playoff	(England) Paul Casey	1,500,000	250,000
Celtic Manor Resort Wales Open
2003	(England) Ian Poulter	270	−18	3 strokes	(South Africa) Darren Fichardt (England) Jonathan Lomas (Australia) Jarrod Moseley	1,500,000	250,000
2002	(Scotland) Paul Lawrie	272	−16	5 strokes	(England) John Bickerton	1,100,000	183,333
2001	(Republic of Ireland) Paul McGinley	138 (Note: Shortened to 36 holes due to rain.)	−6	Playoff	(Scotland) Paul Lawrie (England) Daren Lee	750,000	125,000
2000	(Denmark) Steen Tinning	273	−15	1 stroke	(England) David Howell	750,000	125,000

== See also ==
- Open golf tournament
