= 2009 European Tour =

Golf tour season

2009 European Tour season
- Duration: 6 November 2008 – 22 November 2009
- Number of official events: 51 (Note: A further three tournaments were scheduled but were cancelled.)
- Most wins: (England) Paul Casey (2) (Note: Phil Mickelson and Tiger Woods also won two events, but were not European Tour members.) (England) Simon Dyson (2) (Germany) Martin Kaymer (2) (Thailand) Thongchai Jaidee (2) (South Africa) Richard Sterne (2) (England) Lee Westwood (2)
- Race to Dubai: (England) Lee Westwood
- Golfer of the Year: (England) Lee Westwood
- Players' Player of the Year: (England) Lee Westwood
- Sir Henry Cotton Rookie of the Year: (England) Chris Wood

The 2009 European Tour was the 38th season of the European Tour, the main professional golf tour in Europe since its inaugural season in 1972.

== Race to Dubai introduction ==
There were major changes for the 2009 season as the tour entered a partnership agreement with Dubai based Leisurecorp. The Order of Merit was renamed as the Race to Dubai, with a bonus pool of US$7.5 million (originally $10 million) distributed among the top 15 players at the end of the season, with the winner taking $1.5 million (originally $2 million). The new name reflected the addition of a new season ending tournament, the Dubai World Championship, held at the end of November in Dubai. The tournament also had a $7.5 million prize fund (originally $10 million), and was contested by the leading 60 players in the race following the season's penultimate event, the Hong Kong Open. The winner of the Race to Dubai also received a ten-year European Tour exemption, while the winner of the Dubai World Championship received a five-year exemption. The reduction in prize money, announced in September 2009, was due to the global economic downturn.

== Changes for 2009 ==
Changes for the 2009 season included two new tournaments, the Moravia Silesia Open in the Czech Republic and the Dubai World Championship, the addition of the Singapore Open, and the return of the Volvo World Match Play Championship after being cancelled in 2008. In addition, as a result of plans to realign the schedule with the calendar year for 2010, the HSBC Champions, Hong Kong Open and the Australian Masters were held twice during the 2009 season. The HSBC Champions became a World Golf Championships event effective with its November 2009 edition.

In December 2008, the Indian Masters, scheduled for February, was cancelled due the 2008 financial crisis, and then in January 2009 it was announced that the revival of the English Open, scheduled for August, would be postponed for at least two years after developers of the St. Mellion International Resort ran into financial difficulties. In May it was announced that due to lack of sponsorship the British Masters had also been dropped from the schedule, with the Austrian Open being rescheduled from June to take its place on the calendar in September.

== Schedule ==
The following table lists official events during the 2009 season.

Date	Tournament	Host country	Purse	Winner (Note: The number in brackets after each winner's name is the number of European Tour events they had won up to and including that tournament. This information is only shown for European Tour members and are inclusive of the three United States-based major championships which were included on the schedule for the first time in 1998, with earlier editions having retrospectively been recognised as official tour wins.)	OWGR points	Other tours (Note: AFR − Sunshine Tour; ANZ − PGA Tour of Australasia; ASA − Asian Tour; CHA − Challenge Tour; KOR − Korean Tour; ONE − OneAsia Tour.)	Notes
10 Nov	HSBC Champions	China	US$5,000,000	(Spain) Sergio García (8)	52	AFR, (Note: Sunshine Tour unofficial event) ANZ, (Note: PGA Tour of Australasia unofficial event) ASA (Note: Asian Tour unofficial event)	Limited-field event
23 Nov	UBS Hong Kong Open	Hong Kong	US$2,250,000	(Taiwan) Lin Wen-tang (1)	32	ASA	
30 Nov	Sportsbet Australian Masters	Australia	A$1,500,000	(Australia) Rod Pampling (1)	22	ANZ	
14 Dec	Alfred Dunhill Championship	South Africa	€1,000,000	(South Africa) Richard Sterne (4)	24	AFR	
21 Dec	South African Open Championship	South Africa	€1,000,000	(South Africa) Richard Sterne (5)	40	AFR (Note: Sunshine Tour flagship event)	
11 Jan	Joburg Open	South Africa	€1,100,000	(Denmark) Anders Hansen (3)	20	AFR	
18 Jan	Abu Dhabi Golf Championship	UAE	US$2,000,000	(England) Paul Casey (9)	48		
25 Jan	Commercialbank Qatar Masters	Qatar	US$2,500,000	(Spain) Álvaro Quirós (3)	54		
1 Feb	Dubai Desert Classic	UAE	US$2,500,000	(Northern Ireland) Rory McIlroy (1)	52		
~~8 Feb~~	Indian Masters	India	–	Cancelled	–	ASA	
15 Feb	Maybank Malaysian Open	Malaysia	US$2,000,000	(United States) Anthony Kang (1)	30	ASA	
22 Feb	Johnnie Walker Classic	Australia	£1,250,000	(New Zealand) Danny Lee (a) (1)	32	ANZ, ASA	
1 Mar	WGC-Accenture Match Play Championship	United States	US$8,500,000	(Australia) Geoff Ogilvy (4)	76		World Golf Championship
1 Mar	Enjoy Jakarta Indonesia Open	Indonesia	US$1,250,000	(Thailand) Thongchai Jaidee (3)	20	ASA	
15 Mar	WGC-CA Championship	United States	US$8,500,000	(United States) Phil Mickelson (n/a)	78		World Golf Championship
22 Mar	Madeira Islands Open BPI - Portugal	Portugal	€700,000	(Argentina) Estanislao Goya (1)	24		
29 Mar	Open de Andalucía	Spain	€1,000,000	(Denmark) Søren Kjeldsen (3)	24		
5 Apr	Estoril Open de Portugal	Portugal	€1,250,000	(Northern Ireland) Michael Hoey (1)	24		
12 Apr	Masters Tournament	United States	US$7,500,000	(Argentina) Ángel Cabrera (5)	100		Major championship
19 Apr	Volvo China Open	China	US$2,200,000	(Australia) Scott Strange (2)	18	ONE	
26 Apr	Ballantine's Championship	South Korea	€2,100,000	(Thailand) Thongchai Jaidee (4)	32	ASA, KOR	
3 May	Open de España	Spain	€2,000,000	(France) Thomas Levet (5)	24		
10 May	BMW Italian Open	Italy	€1,300,000	(Argentina) Daniel Vancsik (2)	24		
17 May	3 Irish Open	Ireland	€3,000,000	(Republic of Ireland) Shane Lowry (a) (1)	40		
24 May	BMW PGA Championship	England	€4,500,000	(England) Paul Casey (10)	64		Flagship event
31 May	European Open	England	£1,800,000	(France) Christian Cévaër (2)	48		
7 Jun	Celtic Manor Wales Open	Wales	£1,800,000	(Denmark) Jeppe Huldahl (1)	24		
21 Jun	Saint-Omer Open	France	€600,000	(Sweden) Christian Nilsson (1)	18	CHA	
22 Jun	U.S. Open	United States	US$7,500,000	(United States) Lucas Glover (n/a)	100		Major championship
28 Jun	BMW International Open	Germany	€2,000,000	(England) Nick Dougherty (3)	36		
5 Jul	Open de France Alstom	France	€4,000,000	(Germany) Martin Kaymer (3)	44		
12 Jul	Barclays Scottish Open	Scotland	£3,000,000	(Germany) Martin Kaymer (4)	54		
19 Jul	The Open Championship	Scotland	£4,200,000	(United States) Stewart Cink (1)	100		Major championship
26 Jul	SAS Masters	Sweden	€1,000,000	(Argentina) Ricardo González (4)	24		
2 Aug	Moravia Silesia Open	Czech Republic	€2,000,000	(Sweden) Oskar Henningsson (1)	24		
9 Aug	WGC-Bridgestone Invitational	United States	US$8,500,000	(United States) Tiger Woods (n/a)	76		World Golf Championship
~~16 Aug~~	English Open	England	–	Cancelled	–		
16 Aug	PGA Championship	United States	US$7,500,000	(South Korea) Yang Yong-eun (2)	100		Major championship
23 Aug	KLM Open	Netherlands	€1,800,000	(England) Simon Dyson (3)	24		
30 Aug	Johnnie Walker Championship at Gleneagles	Scotland	£1,400,000	(Sweden) Peter Hedblom (3)	24		
6 Sep	Omega European Masters	Switzerland	€2,000,000	(Sweden) Alex Norén (1)	32	ASA	
13 Sep	Mercedes-Benz Championship	Germany	€2,000,000	(South Africa) James Kingston (2)	40		Limited-field event
~~20 Sep~~	British Masters	England	–	Cancelled	–		
20 Sep; ~~14 Jun~~	Austrian Golf Open	Austria	€1,000,000	(Spain) Rafa Cabrera-Bello (1)	24		
5 Oct	Alfred Dunhill Links Championship	Scotland	US$5,000,000	(England) Simon Dyson (4)	46		Pro-Am
11 Oct	Madrid Masters	Spain	€1,500,000	(England) Ross McGowan (1)	26		
18 Oct	Portugal Masters	Portugal	€3,000,000	(England) Lee Westwood (19)	46		
25 Oct	Castelló Masters Costa Azahar	Spain	€2,000,000	(Sweden) Michael Jonzon (2)	28		
1 Nov	Barclays Singapore Open	Singapore	US$5,000,000	(England) Ian Poulter (8)	46	ASA	New to European Tour
1 Nov	Volvo World Match Play Championship	Spain	€3,250,000	(England) Ross Fisher (3)	42		Limited-field event
8 Nov	WGC-HSBC Champions	China	US$7,000,000	(United States) Phil Mickelson (n/a)	66		World Golf Championship
15 Nov	JBWere Masters	Australia	A$1,500,000	(United States) Tiger Woods (n/a)	28	ANZ	
15 Nov	UBS Hong Kong Open	Hong Kong	US$2,500,000	(France) Grégory Bourdy (3)	44	ASA	
22 Nov	Dubai World Championship	UAE	US$7,500,000	(England) Lee Westwood (20)	56		New tournament Tour Championship

=== Unofficial events ===
The following events were sanctioned by the European Tour, but did not carry official money, nor were wins official.

Date	Tournament	Host country	Purse	Winners	OWGR points	Notes
11 Jan	Royal Trophy	Thailand	€1,000,000	Team Asia	n/a	Team event
27 Sep	Vivendi Trophy with Seve Ballesteros	France	€1,150,000	Team GB&I	n/a	Team event
30 Nov	Omega Mission Hills World Cup	China	US$5,500,000	(Italy) Edoardo Molinari and (Italy) Francesco Molinari	n/a	Team event

== Location of tournaments ==
Location of official tournaments of the 2009 European Tour in Europe.
Major Championship
Flagship event
Regular event
Location of official tournaments of the 2009 European Tour outside Europe.
Major Championship
World Golf Championship
Tour Championship
Regular event

South Africa
United Arab Emirates

== Race to Dubai ==
The Race to Dubai was based on prize money won during the season, calculated in Euros.

Pos.	Player	Majors				WGCs				Principal events		Top 10s in other ET events								Tmts	Money		
Pos.	Player	Mas	USO	Opn	PGA	WGC MP	WGC CA	WGC Inv	WGC Cha	BMW PGA	Dub	1	2	3	4	5	6	7	8	Tmts	Reg. (€)	Bon. ($)	Total (€)
1	(England) Westwood	43rd	T23	T3	T3	T17	T61	9th	T8	CUT	1st	T3	T7	2nd	T8	T8	T9	1st	T9	26	3,240,952	1,500,000	4,237,762
2	(Northern Ireland) McIlroy	T20	T10	T47	T3	T5	T20	T68	4th	5th	3rd	T2	T3	T5	1st	T7	T2	T5	T2	25	2,862,413	1,125,000	3,610,020
3	(Germany) Kaymer	CUT	CUT	T34	T6	T17	T35	T60	T6	T11	T37	T2	T4	1st	1st	T2				20	2,365,937	750,000	2,864,342
4	(England) R. Fisher	T30	5th	T13	T19	4th	T46	43rd	T28	2nd	T42	T8	1st							22	2,132,459	600,000	2,531,183
5	(England) Casey	T20	CUT	T47	•	2nd	T31	WD	WD	1st	•	1st	T4	T10						14	2,014,063	525,000	2,362,947
6	(Australia) Ogilvy	T15	T47	CUT	T43	1st	T40	T22	T10	•	T4	T3								13	1,903,771	450,000	2,202,814
7	(England) Wilson	CUT	T23	T24	T19	T9	T5	T11	T45	CUT	T16	2nd	T6	T2	T5					25	1,736,035	412,500	2,010,158
8	(England) Dyson	•	CUT	•	•	•	•	•	T28	T16	T37	T7	T2	T6	1st	T7	T3	1st	8th	32	1,558,550	375,000	1,807,753
9	(England) Poulter	T20	T18	CUT	T19	T9	T13	T15	T45	•	T9	3rd	1st	T5						15	1,549,187	337,500	1,773,470
10	(Spain) García	T38	T10	T38	CUT	T33	T31	T22	T23	•	T7	1st	T8	T7	4th	T9				17	1,461,426	300,000	1,660,788
11	(South Africa) Els	CUT	CUT	T8	T6	T5	T20	T29	2nd	T21	T50	T3	T4							17	1,397,135	262,500	1,571,577
12	(England) McGowan	•	•	•	•	•	•	•	•	CUT	2nd	T2	3rd	6th	1st					30	1,396,826	243,750	1,558,808
13	(Denmark) Kjeldsen	CUT	•	T27	T6	T33	T7	T68	T10	3rd	T30	1st	T9	T4						26	1,379,731	225,000	1,529,253
14	(Italy) F. Molinari	•	T27	T13	T10	•	•	•	T10	T35	T30	T2	T3	3rd	T6	2nd	T3			27	1,367,949	206,250	1,505,010
15	(Republic of Ireland) Harrington	T35	CUT	T65	T10	T33	T20	T2	T25	•	T4	T5	3rd							16	1,343,631	187,500	1,468,232

Win
Top 10
Made cut
Missed cut
Withdrew
• Did not play

== Awards ==
Award	Winner	Ref.
Golfer of the Year	(England) Lee Westwood	
Players' Player of the Year	(England) Lee Westwood	
Sir Henry Cotton Rookie of the Year	(England) Chris Wood	

== See also ==
- 2009 in golf
- 2009 European Senior Tour
