= Johnnie Walker Championship at Gleneagles =

Johnnie Walker Championship
Tournament information
- Location: Auchterarder, Perthshire, Scotland
- Established: 1999
- Course: Gleneagles Hotel
- Par: 72
- Length: 7,060 yards (6,460 m)
- Tour: European Tour
- Format: Stroke play
- Prize fund: £1,400,000
- Month played: August
- Final year: 2013

Tournament record score
- Aggregate: 262 Adam Scott (2002)
- To par: −26 as above

Final champion
- (England) Tommy Fleetwood
- Location in Scotland Location in Perth and Kinross

The Johnnie Walker Championship at Gleneagles was a European Tour golf tournament which was played at the Gleneagles Hotel in Scotland. The tournament was founded in 1999 as the Scottish PGA Championship, and despite maintaining the same sponsor, has since changed name on several occasions, as Diageo has looked to promote different brands. It was last contested over the PGA Centenary Course, formerly called the Monarch's Course, venue for the 2014 Ryder Cup matches. It was last played in 2013

The tournament was one of three on the European Tour schedule which always takes place in Scotland, the others being the Scottish Open and the Dunhill Links Championship.

The event is not to be confused with the Johnnie Walker Classic, which is a longer established golf tournament played in the Asia-Pacific region, and co-sanctioned by the European, Australasian and Asian tours.

== Winners ==
Year	Winner	Score	To par	Margin of victory	Runner(s)-up
Johnnie Walker Championship at Gleneagles
2013	(England) Tommy Fleetwood	270	−18	Playoff	(Scotland) Stephen Gallacher (Argentina) Ricardo González
2012	(Scotland) Paul Lawrie	272	−16	4 strokes	(Australia) Brett Rumford
2011	(Denmark) Thomas Bjørn	277	−11	Playoff	(South Africa) George Coetzee (England) Mark Foster (Spain) Pablo Larrazábal (Austria) Bernd Wiesberger
2010	(Italy) Edoardo Molinari	278	−10	1 stroke	(Australia) Brett Rumford
2009	(Sweden) Peter Hedblom	275	−13	1 stroke	(Sweden) Martin Erlandsson
2008	(France) Grégory Havret	278	−14	1 stroke	(England) Graeme Storm
2007	(Scotland) Marc Warren	280	−12	Playoff	(England) Simon Wakefield
2006	(England) Paul Casey (2)	276	−16	1 stroke	(Denmark) Søren Hansen (England) Andrew Marshall
2005	(Italy) Emanuele Canonica	281	−7	2 strokes	(Belgium) Nicolas Colsaerts (Wales) Bradley Dredge (England) Barry Lane (England) David Lynn
Diageo Championship at Gleneagles
2004	(England) Miles Tunnicliff	275	−13	5 strokes	(Northern Ireland) Graeme McDowell
2003	(Denmark) Søren Kjeldsen	279	−9	2 strokes	(Scotland) Alastair Forsyth
Diageo Scottish PGA Championship
2002	(Australia) Adam Scott	262	−26	10 strokes	(Scotland) Raymond Russell
Gleneagles Scottish PGA Championship
2001	(England) Paul Casey	274	−14	1 stroke	(Germany) Alex Čejka
Scottish PGA Championship
2000	(Sweden) Pierre Fulke	271	−17	2 strokes	(Sweden) Henrik Nyström
1999	(England) Warren Bennett	282	−6	Playoff	(Netherlands) Rolf Muntz
