= TCL Classic =

Chinese golf tournament

Tournament information
- Location: Hainan Island, China
- Established: 2002
- Course: Yalong Bay Golf Club
- Par: 72
- Length: 7,172 yards (6,558 m)
- Tours: European Tour; Asian Tour
- Format: Stroke play
- Prize fund: US$1,000,000
- Month played: March
- Final year: 2007

Tournament record score
- Aggregate: 263 Johan Edfors (2006)
- To par: −25 as above

Final champion
- (Thailand) Chapchai Nirat
- Location in China

The TCL Classic was a men's professional golf tournament which was played on a course designed by American Robert Trent Jones, Jr. at Yalong Bay Golf Club in Sanya on Hainan Island, People's Republic of China four times between 2002 and 2007. The first tournament was held at Haiyi Golf Club in Dongguan on Guangdong, China, in 2002. It was the first tournament sponsored by the Chinese company TCL Corporation.

The tournament was first played in 2002, when, as an event sanctioned by the Asian Tour, it was won by Scotsman Colin Montgomerie. The event was not held in 2003 or 2004 but was reintroduced in 2005 with co-sanctioning from the European Tour consistent with the latter's expansion to China, in which more Tour events are played than in any other country save the United Kingdom. In 2007, the tournament offered a purse of $1,000,000, which fund was one of the smallest amongst those of European Tour events. The TCL Classic was dropped from the 2008 schedule.

== Winners ==
Year	Tour(s) (Note: ASA − Asian Tour; EUR − European Tour.)	Winner	Score	To par	Margin of victory	Runner-up
2007	ASA, EUR	(Thailand) Chapchai Nirat	266	−22	3 strokes	(Argentina) Rafael Echenique
2006	ASA, EUR	(Sweden) Johan Edfors	263	−25	1 stroke	(Australia) Andrew Buckle
2005	ASA, EUR	(England) Paul Casey	266	−22	Playoff	(Republic of Ireland) Paul McGinley
2003–04: No tournament
2002	ASA	(Scotland) Colin Montgomerie	272	−16	2 strokes	(Thailand) Thongchai Jaidee
