= 2006 HSBC World Match Play Championship =

Coordinates: 51°23′48″N 0°35′45″W

Tournament information
- Dates: 14–17 September 2006
- Location: Virginia Water, Surrey, England
- Course(s): Wentworth Club
- Tour(s): European Tour
- Format: Match play – 36 holes

Statistics
- Par: 72
- Length: 7,308 yards (6,682 m)
- Field: 16 players
- Prize fund: £1,660,000
- Winner's share: £1,000,000

Champion
- (England) Paul Casey
- def. Shaun Micheel 10 & 8

The 2006 HSBC World Match Play Championship was the 43rd HSBC World Match Play Championship played and the 3rd time played as an official European Tour event. It was played from 14 September to 17 September at the Wentworth Club. The champion received €1,443,830 (£1,000,000 or $2,042,513.20) making it the biggest first prize in golf. Each match was played over 36 holes. Paul Casey defeated Shaun Micheel 10&8 in the final to win the tournament for the first time.

== Course ==
| Front Nine | 1 | 2 | 3 | 4 | 5 | 6 | 7 | 8 | 9 | Out |
|---|---|---|---|---|---|---|---|---|---|---|
| Yardage | 473 | 154 | 465 | 552 | 212 | 418 | 396 | 401 | 449 | 3,520 |
| Par | 4 | 3 | 4 | 5 | 3 | 4 | 4 | 4 | 4 | 35 |

| Back Nine | 10 | 11 | 12 | 13 | 14 | 15 | 16 | 17 | 18 | In |
|---|---|---|---|---|---|---|---|---|---|---|
| Yardage | 184 | 416 | 531 | 470 | 179 | 477 | 383 | 610 | 538 | 3,788 |
| Par | 3 | 4 | 5 | 4 | 3 | 4 | 4 | 5 | 5 | 37 |

| | Front 9 | Back 9 | Total |
|---|---|---|---|
| Yardage | 3,520 | 3,788 | 7,308 |
| Par | 35 | 37 | 72 |

== Bracket ==
First round 14 September
1 | (New Zealand) Michael Campbell | 3&1
16 | (England) Simon Khan
8 | (England) David Howell
9 | (Scotland) Colin Montgomerie | 1up
5 | (South Africa) Retief Goosen
12 | (England) Paul Casey | 6&4
4 | (Australia) Adam Scott
13 | (Canada) Mike Weir | 3&2
6 | (United States) Jim Furyk
11 | (Sweden) Robert Karlsson | 5&4
3 | (South Africa) Ernie Els
14 | (Argentina) Ángel Cabrera | 2&1
7 | (England) Luke Donald | 2up
10 | (South Africa) Tim Clark
2 | (United States) Tiger Woods
15 | (United States) Shaun Micheel | 4&3

Quarterfinals; 15 September
1 | (New Zealand) Michael Campbell
9 | (Scotland) Colin Montgomerie | 1up
12 | (England) Paul Casey | 5&3
13 | (Canada) Mike Weir
11 | (Sweden) Robert Karlsson | 4&3
14 | (Argentina) Ángel Cabrera
7 | (England) Luke Donald
15 | (United States) Shaun Micheel | 4&2

Semifinals; 16 September
9 | (Scotland) Colin Montgomerie
12 | (England) Paul Casey | 6&5
14 | (Sweden) Robert Karlsson
15 | (United States) Shaun Micheel | 2up

Championship; 17 September
12 | (England) Paul Casey | 10&8
15 | (United States) Shaun Micheel

== Prize money breakdown ==
=== Actual prize fund ===
| Place | Euro (€) | Pounds (£) | US ($) |
|---|---|---|---|
| Champion | 1,443,830 | 1,000,000 | 2,042,513.20 |
| Runner-Up | 577,532 | 400,000 | 817,005.28 |
| Losing Semi Finalist x 2 | 173,259 | 120,000 | 245,100.73 |
| Losing Quarter Finalists x 4 | 115,506 | 80,000 | 163,400.49 |
| Losing First Round x 8 | 86,629 | 60,000 | 122,549.66 |
| Total | €2,396,756 | £1,660,000 | $3,390,569.36 |

=== Breakdown for European Tour Order of Merit ===
| Place | Euro (€) | Pounds (£) | US ($) |
|---|---|---|---|
| Champion | 597,884 | 406,660 | 830,607.13 |
| Runner-Up | 398,594 | 271,110 | 553,744.69 |
| Losing Semi Finalist x 2 | 201,968 | 120,000 | 280,582.97 |
| Losing Quarter Finalists x 4 | 118,742 | 80,000 | 164,960.85 |
| Losing First Round x 8 | 61,972 | 42,151 | 86,092.73 |
| Total | €1,379,120 | £938,014.17 | $1,915,988.37 |

- Source for $US Dollar conversions
