= Alfred Dunhill Links Championship =

Golf tournament held in Scotland

Coordinates: 56.15°N 3.12°W

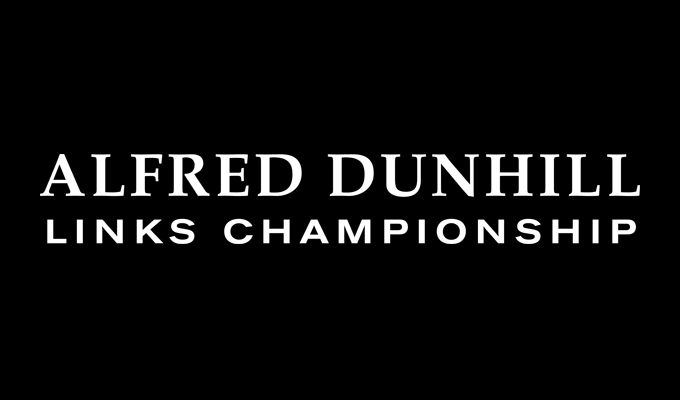

Tournament information
- Location: Angus and Fife, Scotland
- Established: 2001
- Courses: Old Course at St Andrews; Carnoustie Golf Links; Kingsbarns Golf Links
- Par: 72 (SA); 72 (C); 72 (K)
- Length: 7,318 yards (6,692 m) (SA); 7,394 yards (6,761 m) (C); 7,228 yards (6,609 m) (K)
- Organized by: IMG
- Tour: European Tour
- Format: Stroke play
- Prize fund: US$5,000,000
- Month played: October

Tournament record score
- Aggregate: 264 Tyrrell Hatton (2017); 264 Tyrrell Hatton (2024)
- To par: −24 as above

Current champion
- (Poland) Adrian Meronk

Location map
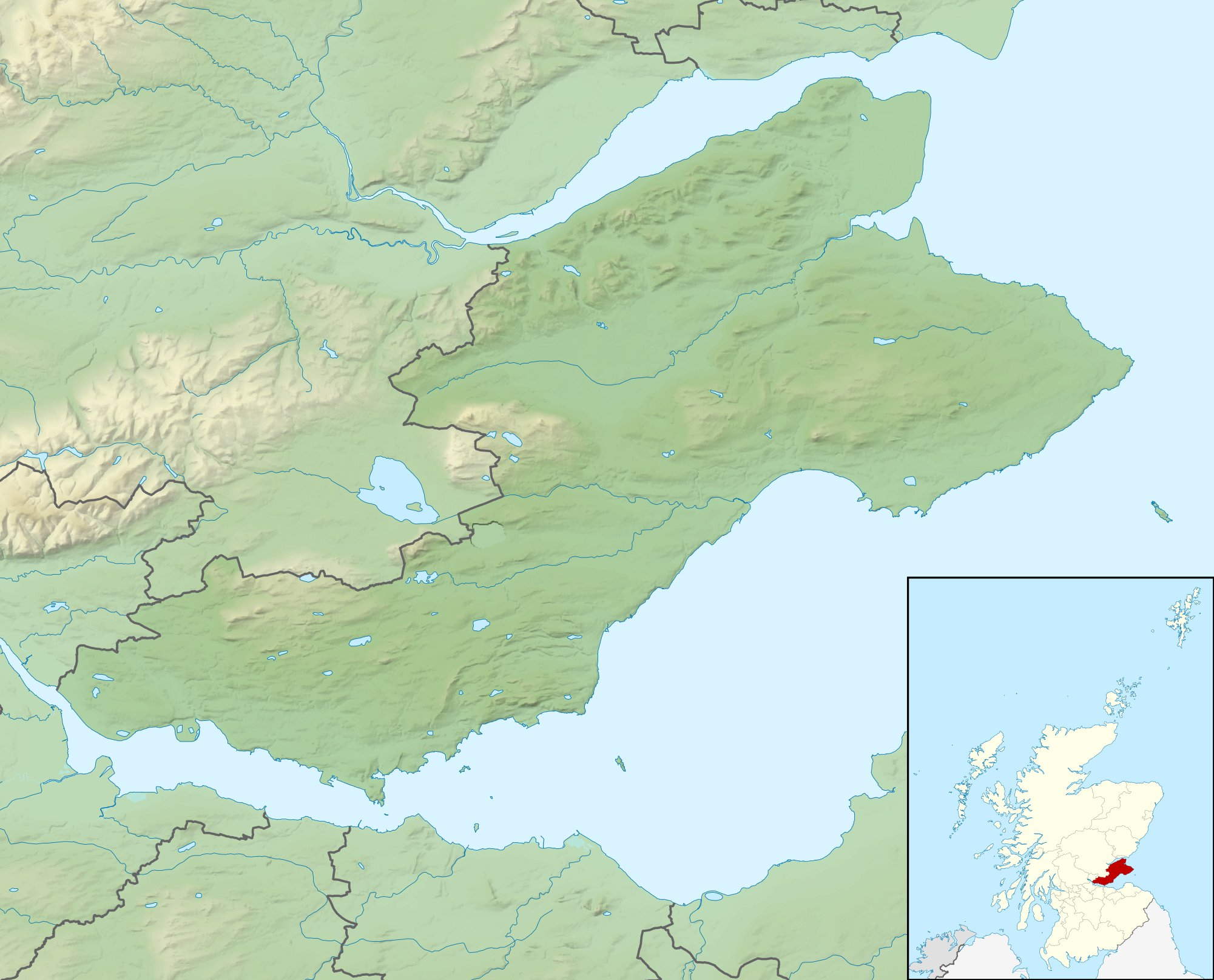
- Location in Scotland Location in Fife

The Alfred Dunhill Links Championship is a golf tournament on the European Tour. It is played in September or October, on three different links courses, centered on the "home of golf", St Andrews in Fife, Scotland.

== Format and history ==
The tournament is a pro-am, with the format based on the long-running United States PGA Tour's AT&T Pebble Beach National Pro-Am held annually since 1937 (except during the Second World War), where each team consists of one amateur and one professional. The three course rotation consists of The Old Course at St Andrews, Carnoustie Golf Links and Kingsbarns Golf Links.

The 54-hole cut is made of the top 60 professionals and the leading 20 pro-am teams, regardless of the professional member of the team making the individual cut. These players and teams advance to the final round at St Andrews.

Originally called the Dunhill Links Championship, the event was introduced in 2001 as a replacement for the Alfred Dunhill Cup, a three-man team tournament which had become marginalised when the long established World Cup of Golf was given enhanced status as part of the World Golf Championships in 2000, becoming the WGC-World Cup.

To increase interest in the event, many of the amateurs are well known personalities from the worlds of sport and entertainment. These have included Tico Torres, Nigel Mansell, Ian Botham, Gary Lineker, Boris Becker, Michael Douglas, Samuel L. Jackson, Michael Vaughan, Matthew Pinsent, Hugh Grant, Justin Timberlake, Michael Phelps, Bill Murray, Shane Warne and Andy Murray.

== Winners ==
Year	Winner	Score	To par	Margin of victory	Runner(s)-up
Alfred Dunhill Links Championship
2026	(Poland) Adrian Meronk	268	−20	2 strokes	(South Africa) Casey Jarvis (Denmark) Niklas Nørgaard
2025	(Scotland) Robert MacIntyre	198 (Note: Shortened to 54 holes due to weather.)	−18	4 strokes	(England) Tyrrell Hatton
2024	(England) Tyrrell Hatton (3)	264	−24	1 stroke	(Belgium) Nicolas Colsaerts
2023	(England) Matt Fitzpatrick	197	−19	3 strokes	(England) Marcus Armitage (New Zealand) Ryan Fox (England) Matthew Southgate
2022	(New Zealand) Ryan Fox	273	−15	1 stroke	(Sweden) Alex Norén (England) Callum Shinkwin
2021	(England) Danny Willett	270	−18	2 strokes	(England) Tyrrell Hatton (Sweden) Joakim Lagergren
2020	Cancelled due to the COVID-19 pandemic				
2019	(France) Victor Perez	266	−22	1 stroke	(England) Matthew Southgate
2018	(Denmark) Lucas Bjerregaard	273	−15	1 stroke	(England) Tommy Fleetwood (England) Tyrrell Hatton
2017	(England) Tyrrell Hatton (2)	264	−24	3 strokes	(England) Ross Fisher
2016	(England) Tyrrell Hatton	265	−23	4 strokes	(England) Ross Fisher (South Africa) Richard Sterne
2015	(Denmark) Thorbjørn Olesen	270	−18	2 strokes	(United States) Brooks Koepka (United States) Chris Stroud
2014	(England) Oliver Wilson	271	−17	1 stroke	(England) Tommy Fleetwood (Northern Ireland) Rory McIlroy (Scotland) Richie Ramsay
2013	(England) David Howell	265	−23	Playoff	(United States) Peter Uihlein
2012	(South Africa) Branden Grace	266	−22	2 strokes	(Denmark) Thorbjørn Olesen
2011	(Northern Ireland) Michael Hoey	266	−22	2 strokes	(Northern Ireland) Rory McIlroy
2010	(Germany) Martin Kaymer	271	−17	3 strokes	(England) Danny Willett
2009	(England) Simon Dyson	268	−20	3 strokes	(Northern Ireland) Rory McIlroy (England) Oliver Wilson
2008	(Sweden) Robert Karlsson	278	−10	Playoff	(England) Ross Fisher (Germany) Martin Kaymer
2007	(England) Nick Dougherty	270	−18	2 strokes	(England) Justin Rose
2006	(Republic of Ireland) Pádraig Harrington (2)	271	−17	5 strokes	(Wales) Bradley Dredge (United States) Edward Loar (England) Anthony Wall
Dunhill Links Championship
2005	(Scotland) Colin Montgomerie	279	−9	1 stroke	(England) Kenneth Ferrie
2004	(Scotland) Stephen Gallacher	269	−19	Playoff	(Northern Ireland) Graeme McDowell
2003	(England) Lee Westwood	267	−21	1 stroke	(South Africa) Ernie Els
2002	(Republic of Ireland) Pádraig Harrington	269	−19	Playoff	(Argentina) Eduardo Romero
2001	(Scotland) Paul Lawrie	270	−18	1 stroke	(South Africa) Ernie Els
