= Ross Fisher =

English professional golfer (born 1980)

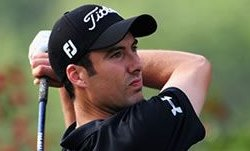

Personal information
- Full name: Ross Daniel Fisher
- Nationality: England
- Born: 22 November 1980 (age 45) Ascot, Berkshire, England
- Height: 6 ft 3 in (1.91 m)
- Weight: 168 lb (76 kg; 12.0 st)
- Spouse: Joanne Fisher
- Children: 2

Career
- Sport: Golf
- Turned professional: 2004
- Current tour: European Tour
- Former tour: PGA Tour
- Professional wins: 5
- Highest ranking: 17 (1 November 2009)

Number of wins by tour
- European Tour: 5
- Sunshine Tour: 1

Best results in major championships
- Masters Tournament: T15: 2011
- PGA Championship: T19: 2009
- U.S. Open: 5th: 2009
- The Open Championship: T13: 2009

Ross Daniel Fisher (born 22 November 1980) is an English professional golfer who plays on the European Tour, where he has won five times, including the 2009 Volvo World Match Play Championship at Finca Cortesin Golf Club in Spain. In 2017, he broke the course record at the Old Course at St Andrews, becoming the first player to shoot 61 at the historic course.

== Early life ==
Fisher was born in Ascot, Berkshire. His home course is the famous Wentworth Golf Club, Surrey, England, the location of the European Tour administrative headquarters. As a child, he attended Charters School, a state comprehensive close to Wentworth.

== Professional career ==
Fisher joined the European Tour in 2006. He earned his card by finishing 18th on the Challenge Tour's money list in 2005. During Fisher's first season on the European Tour he won a Jaguar for a nearest to the pin contest in the 2006 Quinn Direct British Masters.

In 2007, Fisher won the KLM Open by one stroke over Joost Luiten, and subsequently finished the year ranked 43rd on the Order of Merit. Fisher started the 2008 season with a joint-second place in the HSBC Champions tournament in Shanghai, beaten by Phil Mickelson in a three-way play-off that also featured Lee Westwood.

In July 2008, Fisher won the European Open on the Heritage Course at The London Golf Club; the first staging of the event at the venue in Kent, England. Despite never having played the course either in competition or in practice, Fisher shot a first round 63—the lowest round thus far in his professional career—which featured a wind-assisted 413-yard drive on the 9th hole, his last of the day. Having established a first round lead, he was never subsequently headed at the top of the leaderboard, going on to win the tournament by a comfortable seven shots from Sergio García. Fisher played steadily for the rest of the season and finished sixth on the Tour's Order of Merit.

Fisher's progress continued in 2009 when he reached the semi-final of the WGC-Accenture Match Play Championship in Arizona, losing to fellow Englishman Paul Casey 4 & 3. Fisher also finished second at the BMW PGA Championship at Wentworth Club, after shooting a 64 in his final round, which included 6 birdies in the first 12 holes. Fisher's 64 was just a shot outside the Wentworth course record and he finished a stroke behind the winner Paul Casey. Fisher was in contention during the final round of the 2009 U.S. Open at Bethpage Black, New York up until a three-putt bogey at the par three 17th hole. Fisher finished in 5th place, three shots behind the champion Lucas Glover. The following month, at the 138th Open Championship at Turnberry, Fisher held a two-stroke lead in the early stages of the final round, before taking a quadruple-bogey eight on the par four 5th hole after driving into long rough on the right side of the hole. He eventually finished in a tie for 13th place.

In 2009, Fisher had the lowest cumulative score for the four major championships for players who made the cut in all four events. Fisher's cumulative score of +2 was one stroke better than Henrik Stenson of Sweden. At the end of 2009, Fisher won the first Volvo World Match Play Championship that was held away from Wentworth, defeating American Anthony Kim, 4 and 3, in the final at Finca Cortesín Golf Club in Spain. The win lifted him to 17th in the world rankings and he finished the season in fourth place in the Race to Dubai.

Fisher finished runner-up to David Horsey in June 2010 BMW International Open. The following month he had an excellent chance to shoot a round of 59 and thus make European Tour golf history at the 3 Irish Open in Killarney, when he was 10-under-par with four holes to play, only needing to birdie two of the remaining four holes, but he parred the last four holes for a round of 61. He won the tournament with an 18-under-par score of 266. Fisher qualified for the 2010 European Ryder Cup team, which regained the trophy from the United States at Celtic Manor, Wales, on 4 October. He contributed two points towards the European team total and finished with a record of 2–2–0.

After his successes from 2008 to 2010, Fisher had three disappointing seasons in 2011, 2012 to 2013. Fisher was joint 15th in the 2011 Masters Tournament but finished the year with a world ranking of 100. He was runner-up three times in these three seasons; in the Nordea Masters and the Portugal Masters in 2012 and the 2013 Perth International. Fisher was 52nd, 38th and 40th in the Order of Merit in these three seasons.

In March 2014, Fisher won his fifth European Tour title at the Tshwane Open in South Africa, his first win since 2010. Fisher won by three strokes over Michael Hoey and Daniel van Tonder, having entered the day five ahead of the field. Fisher lost in a three-man playoff for the BMW Masters, the first of the Final Series events that concluded the European Tour season. Marcel Siem won the tournament with a birdie at the first extra hole. The good result enable Fisher to finish the season 20th in the Race to Dubai.

Fisher started the 2015 European Tour season playing in the Nedbank Golf Challenge at the end of 2014, where he finished second behind Danny Willett. This and a third-place finish in the 2015 WGC-HSBC Champions were his best results of the season. The early part of 2016 was disappointing but, late in the season, he was runner-up in the Porsche European Open and the Alfred Dunhill Links Championship and finished in the top-20 of the Race to Dubai for the third successive season.

At the 2017 Alfred Dunhill Links Championship, Fisher broke the record for the lowest score on the Old Course at St Andrews with a 61. At the last hole of his round, he three-putted from 25 feet, just outside the green, including missing a birdie putt from four feet.

== Personal life ==
Fisher is married to Joanne with whom he has a daughter, Eve. Joanne gave birth to the couple's second child in 2011 named Harry.

== Amateur wins ==
- 2003 Sunningdale Foursomes (with Simon Griffiths), Finnish Amateur Open Championship, Berkshire Trophy (tie with Adam Blyth)
- 2004 Sunningdale Foursomes (with Simon Griffiths)

== Professional wins (5) ==
=== European Tour wins (5) ===
| No. | Date | Tournament | Winning score | Margin of victory | Runner(s)-up |
|---|---|---|---|---|---|
| 1 | 26 Aug 2007 | KLM Open | −12 (66-67-68-67=268) | 1 stroke | (Netherlands) Joost Luiten |
| 2 | 6 Jul 2008 | European Open | −20 (63-68-69-68=268) | 7 strokes | (Spain) Sergio García |
| 3 | 1 Nov 2009 | Volvo World Match Play Championship | 4 and 3 | | (United States) Anthony Kim |
| 4 | 1 Aug 2010 | 3 Irish Open | −18 (69-61-71-65=266) | 2 strokes | (Republic of Ireland) Pádraig Harrington |
| 5 | 2 Mar 2014 | Tshwane Open^{1} | −20 (66-65-67-70=268) | 3 strokes | (Northern Ireland) Michael Hoey, (South Africa) Daniel van Tonder |

^{1}Co-sanctioned by the Sunshine Tour

European Tour playoff record (0–5)

| No. | Year | Tournament | Opponent(s) | Result |
|---|---|---|---|---|
| 1 | 2007 | HSBC Champions | (United States) Phil Mickelson, (England) Lee Westwood | Mickelson won with birdie on second extra hole |
| 2 | 2008 | Alfred Dunhill Links Championship | (Sweden) Robert Karlsson, (Germany) Martin Kaymer | Karlsson won with birdie on first extra hole |
| 3 | 2013 | ISPS Handa Perth International | (South Korea) Jin Jeong | Lost to par on first extra hole |
| 4 | 2014 | BMW Masters | (France) Alexander Lévy, (Germany) Marcel Siem | Siem won with birdie on first extra hole |
| 5 | 2016 | Porsche European Open | (France) Alexander Lévy | Lost to birdie on second extra hole |

== Results in major championships ==
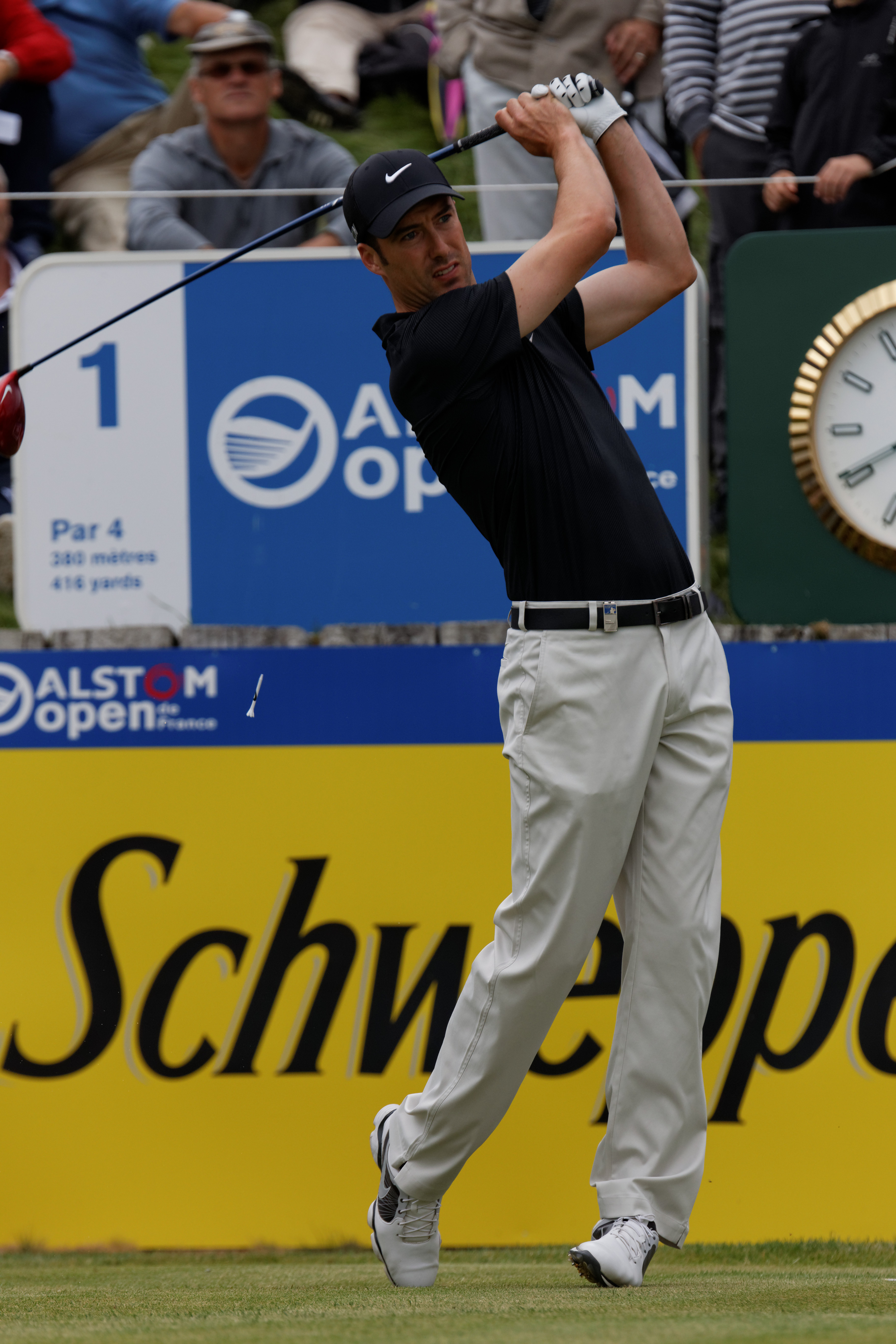
Ross Fisher

| Tournament | 2007 | 2008 | 2009 |
|---|---|---|---|
| Masters Tournament | | | T30 |
| U.S. Open | | CUT | 5 |
| The Open Championship | CUT | T39 | T13 |
| PGA Championship | | CUT | T19 |

| Tournament | 2010 | 2011 | 2012 | 2013 | 2014 | 2015 | 2016 | 2017 | 2018 |
|---|---|---|---|---|---|---|---|---|---|
| Masters Tournament | CUT | T15 | T47 | | | | | T41 | CUT |
| U.S. Open | CUT | | | | | | | CUT | T48 |
| The Open Championship | T37 | CUT | T45 | | CUT | T68 | CUT | T44 | T39 |
| PGA Championship | CUT | T45 | | | CUT | CUT | T42 | CUT | T65 |

| Tournament | 2019 | 2020 | 2021 | 2022 | 2023 |
|---|---|---|---|---|---|
| Masters Tournament | | | | | |
| PGA Championship | T60 | | | | |
| U.S. Open | | | | | CUT |
| The Open Championship | | NT | | | |

Top 10
Did not play

CUT = missed the half-way cut
"T" = tied
NT = No tournament due to the COVID-19 pandemic

=== Summary ===
| Tournament | Wins | 2nd | 3rd | Top-5 | Top-10 | Top-25 | Events | Cuts made |
|---|---|---|---|---|---|---|---|---|
| Masters Tournament | 0 | 0 | 0 | 0 | 0 | 1 | 6 | 4 |
| PGA Championship | 0 | 0 | 0 | 0 | 0 | 1 | 10 | 5 |
| U.S. Open | 0 | 0 | 0 | 1 | 1 | 1 | 6 | 2 |
| The Open Championship | 0 | 0 | 0 | 0 | 0 | 1 | 11 | 7 |
| Totals | 0 | 0 | 0 | 1 | 1 | 4 | 33 | 18 |

- Most consecutive cuts made – 4 (twice)
- Longest streak of top-10s – 1

== Results in The Players Championship ==
| Tournament | 2009 | 2010 | 2011 | 2012 | 2013 | 2014 | 2015 | 2016 | 2017 | 2018 |
|---|---|---|---|---|---|---|---|---|---|---|
| The Players Championship | CUT | CUT | CUT | | | | | | CUT | 71 |

Did not play

CUT = missed the halfway cut

== Results in World Golf Championships ==
Results not in chronological order before 2015.

| Tournament | 2008 | 2009 | 2010 | 2011 | 2012 | 2013 | 2014 | 2015 | 2016 | 2017 | 2018 |
|---|---|---|---|---|---|---|---|---|---|---|---|
| Championship | T34 | T46 | T45 | T61 | | | | T23 | T42 | T3 | T46 |
| Match Play | | 4 | R64 | R32 | | | | | | QF | T36 |
| Invitational | T56 | 43 | T46 | | | | | | | T44 | T17 |
| Champions | | T28 | T16 | | | | | T3 | T6 | T58 | |

Top 10
Did not play

QF, R16, R32, R64 = Round in which player lost in match play
"T" = tied
The HSBC Champions did not become a WGC event until 2009.

== Team appearances ==
Amateur

- European Amateur Team Championship (representing England): 2003

Professional

- World Cup (representing England): 2008, 2009
- Seve Trophy (representing Great Britain & Ireland): 2009 (winners), 2011 (winners)
- Ryder Cup (representing Europe): 2010 (winners)
- EurAsia Cup (representing Europe): 2016 (winners), 2018 (winners)

Ryder Cup points record

| 2010 | Total |
|---|---|
| 2 | 2 |

== See also ==
- 2005 Challenge Tour graduates
- 2005 European Tour Qualifying School graduates
- 2012 PGA Tour Qualifying School graduates
