= Scott Strange =

Australian professional golfer

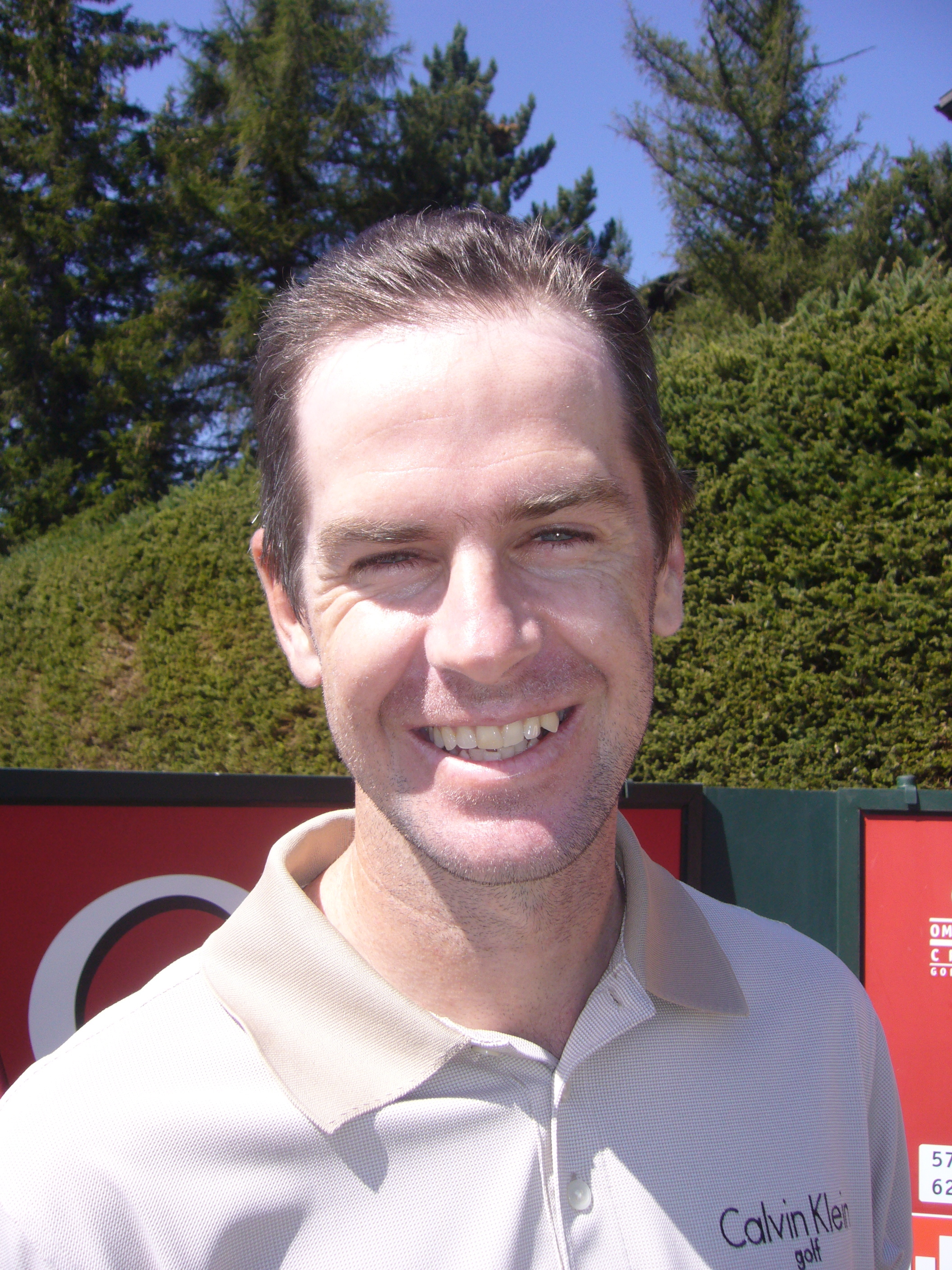

Personal information
- Nationality: Australia
- Born: 7 April 1977 (age 49) Perth, Western Australia
- Height: 1.82 m (6 ft 0 in)
- Children: 2

Career
- Sport: Golf
- Turned professional: 2001
- Current tours: Japan Golf Tour; PGA Tour of Australasia
- Former tours: European Tour; Asian Tour; OneAsia Tour
- Professional wins: 8
- Highest ranking: 81 (1 June 2008)

Number of wins by tour
- European Tour: 2
- Asian Tour: 2
- Other: 3

Best results in major championships
- Masters Tournament: DNP
- PGA Championship: CUT: 2008
- U.S. Open: DNP
- The Open Championship: CUT: 2008, 2015

Achievements and awards
- OneAsia Tour Order of Merit winner: 2009

Scott Strange (born 7 April 1977) is an Australian professional golfer who competes on the European Tour, OneAsia Tour and the Asian Tour.

== Early life and amateur career ==
In 1977, Strange was born in Perth, Australia.

As an amateur, Strange frequently represented the Western Australia amateur team in Australian Golf Union (now Golf Australia) events. Individually, he won the 1998 Western Australian Amateur and the 2000 Lake Macquarie Amateur.

== Professional career ==
In 2001, Strange turned professional. In 2003, Strange joined the Asian Tour via its Qualifying School. In 2005, he first experienced Asian Tour success when he won the Myanmar Open. The following year he captured the 2006 Philippine Open. Having performed well in tournaments co-sanctioned by the European Tour during 2007, Strange earned a place on the European Tour for 2008 through his position on the Order of Merit.

During his first season on the European Tour, Strange recorded his first win with a wire-to-wire victory at the 2008 Celtic Manor Wales Open, which lifted him into the top 100 of the Official World Golf Rankings for the first time. In April 2009 he won the Volvo China Open by a shot.

== Amateur wins ==
- 1998 Western Australian Amateur
- 2000 Lake Macquarie Amateur

== Professional wins (8) ==
=== European Tour wins (2) ===
No.	Date	Tournament	Winning score	Margin of victory	Runner-up
1	1 Jun 2008	Celtic Manor Wales Open	−22 (63-66-69-64=262)	4 strokes	(Sweden) Robert Karlsson
2	19 Apr 2009	Volvo China Open^{1}	−8 (70-73-69-68=280)	1 stroke	(Spain) Gonzalo Fernández-Castaño

^{1}Co-sanctioned by the OneAsia Tour

=== Asian Tour wins (2) ===
No.	Date	Tournament	Winning score	Margin of victory	Runner-up
1	27 Feb 2005	Myanmar Open	−11 (69-72-69-67=277)	2 strokes	(Canada) Rick Gibson
2	28 May 2006	Philippine Open	−8 (68-70-72-70=280)	5 strokes	(South Korea) Park Jun-won

=== OneAsia Tour wins (1) ===
No.	Date	Tournament	Winning score	Margin of victory	Runner-up
1	19 Apr 2009	Volvo China Open^{1}	−8 (70-73-69-68=280)	1 stroke	(Spain) Gonzalo Fernández-Castaño

^{1}Co-sanctioned by the European Tour

=== Other wins (4) ===
- 2002 Vanuatu Open
- 2003 Port Hedland Classic
- 2005 Vanuatu Open
- 2012 Nedlands Masters

== Playoff record ==
PGA Tour of Australasia playoff record (0–1)

No.	Year	Tournament	Opponent	Result
1	2013	New Zealand PGA Championship	(New Zealand) Michael Hendry	Lost to par on first extra hole

== Results in major championships ==
Tournament	2008	2009	2010	2011	2012	2013	2014	2015
Masters Tournament								
U.S. Open								
The Open Championship	CUT							CUT
PGA Championship	CUT							

Did not play

CUT = missed the half-way cut
"T" = tied

== Results in World Golf Championships ==
Tournament	2008	2009
Match Play		
Championship		
Invitational	T63	
Champions		T33

Did not play

"T" = Tied
Note that the HSBC Champions did not become a WGC event until 2009.
