= Paul Casey =

English professional golfer (born 1977)

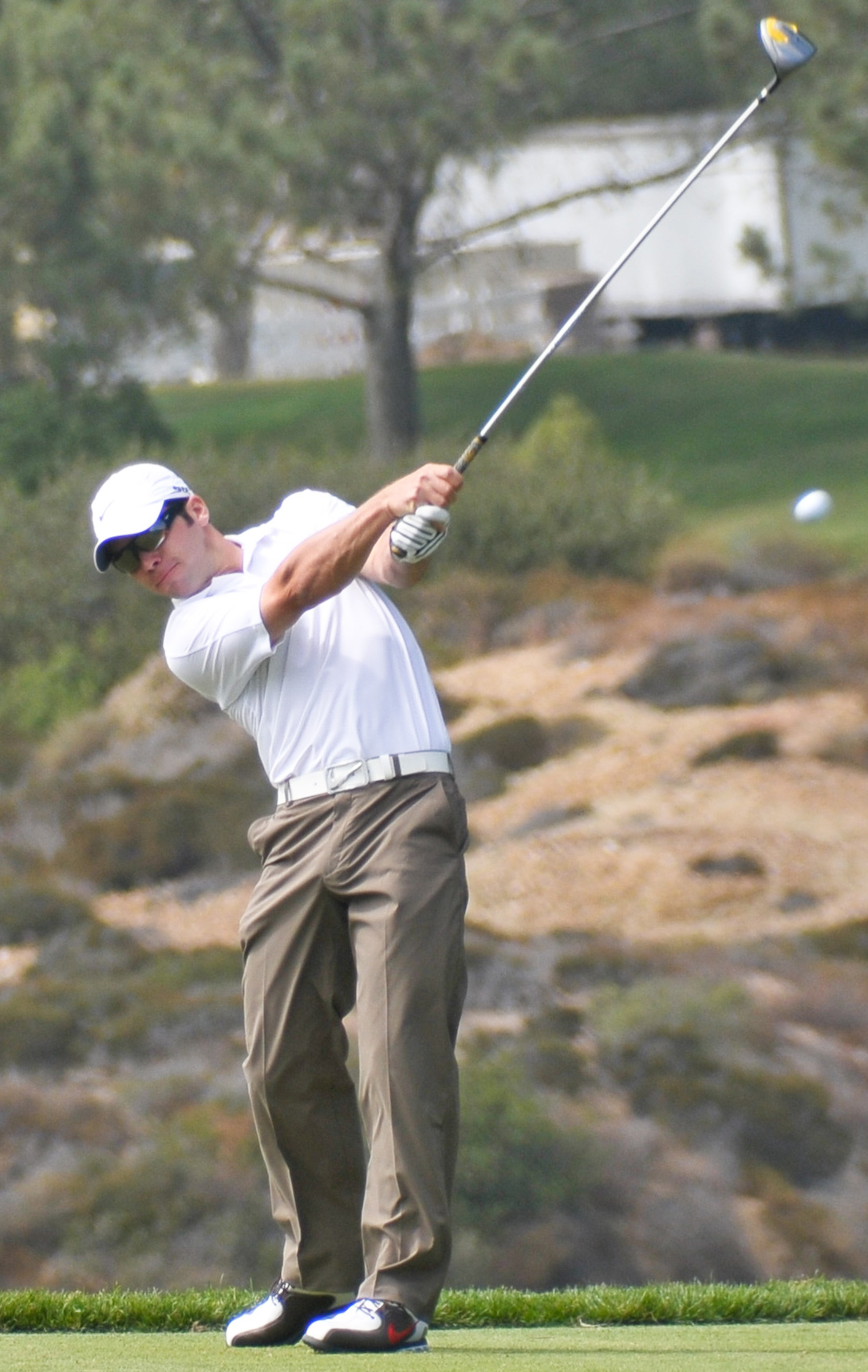
- Casey at the 2008 U.S. Open

Personal information
- Full name: Paul Alexander Casey
- Nationality: England
- Born: 21 July 1977 (age 49) Cheltenham, Gloucestershire, England
- Height: 5 ft 10 in (1.78 m)
- Weight: 180 lb (82 kg; 13 st)
- Spouses: Jocelyn Hefner (m. 2008; div. 2011) Pollyanna Woodward (m. 2015)

Career
- Sport: Golf
- College: Arizona State University
- Turned professional: 2000
- Current tours: Asian Tour; LIV Golf
- Former tours: PGA Tour; European Tour
- Professional wins: 21
- Highest ranking: 3 (24 May 2009)

Number of wins by tour
- PGA Tour: 3
- European Tour: 15
- Asian Tour: 2
- PGA Tour of Australasia: 1
- Other: 3

Best results in major championships
- Masters Tournament: T4: 2016
- PGA Championship: T2: 2020
- U.S. Open: T7: 2021
- The Open Championship: T3: 2010

Achievements and awards
- Sir Henry Cotton Rookie of the Year: 2001
- European Tour Golfer of the Year: 2006

Paul Alexander Casey (born 21 July 1977) is an English golfer who is a member of LIV Golf. He has also played on the US-based PGA Tour and the European Tour. In 2009, he achieved his highest position, third, in the Official World Golf Ranking.

== Early life ==
Casey was born in Cheltenham, Gloucestershire, but moved with his family to Weybridge, Surrey at the age of six. After attending Cleves School, Weybridge and then Hampton School, west London, he studied A levels at Strode's College, Egham, Surrey.

== Amateur career ==
Casey attended Arizona State University on an athletic scholarship. His amateur career was distinguished. In the US he won three consecutive Pac-12 Championships (1998, 1999 and 2000). In 2000 he broke the championship scoring record held by Tiger Woods (18 under par) with a 23-under-par 265.

Back on the other side of the Atlantic he won the English Amateur in 1999 and 2000. He was also a member of Great Britain and Ireland's winning 1999 Walker Cup team, where he was only the third player in 77 years to record four victories without a single defeat.

== Professional career ==
=== European Tour ===
Casey joined the European Tour in May 2001, and recorded a second in his fifth event and a win in his eleventh, the Gleneagles Scottish PGA Championship. He ended that season 22nd on the order of merit and won the Sir Henry Cotton Rookie of the Year award. After a disappointing second season he won the ANZ Championship and the Benson and Hedges International Open in 2003, and came sixth on the Order of Merit.

Casey did not win any individual titles in 2004, but he was a member of the victorious European Ryder Cup team and also won the WGC-World Cup for England in partnership with Luke Donald. Another highlight of his year was a sixth-place finish in his first Masters. He joined the PGA Tour shortly afterwards as a Special Temporary Member and his membership of the 2004 European Ryder Cup Team qualified him for membership of the US based tour for the 2005 season. However he continues to play mainly in Europe, and was the leader of the European Tour Order of Merit in 2006, until Pádraig Harrington overtook him in the final event. He re-joined the PGA Tour in 2009.

Casey has featured in the top 10 of the Official World Golf Ranking and was the highest ranked Englishman for a time. In January 2007 he reached a career high of No. 13 in the rankings.

In 2006, Casey won the HSBC World Match Play Championship at Wentworth, beating Shaun Micheel 10 and 8 in a record victory for the final. Casey became the only player in Ryder Cup history to win a foursome match with a hole-in-one on Saturday, 23 September 2006, in Ireland.

Casey sparked controversy in November 2004, when in an interview for the Sunday Times newspaper he reportedly said, of the US Ryder Cup team, "Oh, we properly hate them. We wanted to beat them as badly as possible". Several leading American golfers, including Fred Funk and Davis Love III, publicly dismissed the controversy surrounding Casey as tabloid mischief. Casey later apologised, saying the remarks were taken out of context and using the word "hate" was an error. Casey said he has an American coach (Peter Kostis) and an American girlfriend, and says he "has nothing against America".

=== PGA Tour ===
Casey earned his first PGA Tour win on 5 April 2009 by defeating J. B. Holmes in a one-hole playoff at the Shell Houston Open. This win took him to No. 6 in the Official World Golf Ranking.

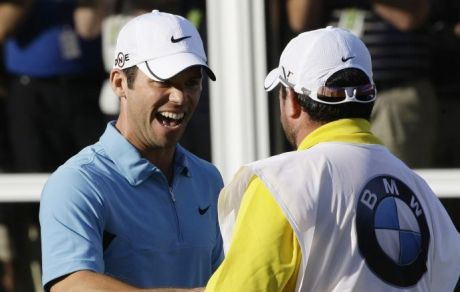
Casey (left) celebrates after winning the 2009 BMW PGA Championship.

Casey won his milestone 10th event on the European Tour at the 2009 BMW PGA Championship at Wentworth Golf Club in Surrey, where he won by one stroke over Wentworth resident and fellow Englishman Ross Fisher. This win vaulted Casey to a career high of 3rd in the Official World Golf Ranking. He had been ranked at No. 41 at the beginning of 2009. Casey suffered a rib injury at the 2009 Open Championship, limiting the amount of golf he could play in the second half of 2009.

In January 2011, Casey won the Volvo Golf Champions tournament in Bahrain, which was his first win for 20 months.

Casey won the 2012 Telus World Skins Game in Canada, having defeated Jhonattan Vegas in a tiebreaker during the event in July.

In June 2013, Casey won his 12th European Tour title at The Irish Open to end a two-and-a-half-year winless drought, due to form and fitness problems. He captured the title with a final round 67 in changeable conditions, to win by three strokes over Joost Luiten and Robert Rock. He had begun the day four shots behind the leader Luiten, but a run of five birdies in six holes in the middle of the round opened up a three shot lead. It was reduced to one stroke, when Casey bogeyed the 15th and 16th, but a closing eagle on the par five 18th sealed the victory.

In September 2014, Casey won his 13th European Tour title at the KLM Open in the Netherlands, his first victory of the 2014 season. He took victory after posting a final round 66, putting him one shot ahead of runner up, and fellow Englishman Simon Dyson. He started the final round four strokes off the lead of Romain Wattel. The victory was especially emotional and gratifying as Casey's wife Pollyanna had given birth to the couple's first child two weeks prior to the event.

In 2015, Casey chose to give up his European Tour exemption and focus solely on the PGA Tour, citing a need to lessen his travel. In February 2015, Casey finished in a tie for second at the Northern Trust Open after losing in a sudden-death playoff to James Hahn. Casey finished the tournament at six-under-par, tied with Hahn and Dustin Johnson. After the trio all parred the first extra hole, Casey could only make a par on the second extra hole and was eliminated when Hahn and Johnson both got up and down for birdies from the green-side rough. Casey continued his good form in America the following week, when he finished in a tie for third at the Honda Classic, one shot outside a playoff. Two weeks later he equalled his 2004 performance by finishing tied for 6th place in the 2015 Masters.

In 2016, Casey finished 2nd at both the Deutsche Bank Championship and the BMW Championship before finishing 4th at the Tour Championship to finish 5th in the 2016 FedEx Cup Playoffs, his best career performance in the Playoffs.

In December 2015, Casey chose not to rejoin the European Tour for the following 2016 season, which made himself unavailable to qualify for the 2016 Ryder Cup. Casey reached the 15th position in the Official World Golf Rankings, just prior to the 2016 Ryder Cup, due to his in-form performances in the PGA Tour playoff tournaments immediately before the Ryder Cup event. Casey admitted that he was hurt that he was not able to participate in the 2016 Ryder Cup, due to his decision then not to obtain European Tour member status, whilst others noted that England's most in-form golfer then, was remarkably absent from the premier golf team event.

Casey rejoined the tour in late October 2017 with aspirations of making the European team for the 2018 match at Le Golf National. Casey remarked that he needed to play in another Ryder Cup, he missed the European Tour and being part of English golf. Casey was subsequently selected for the EurAsia Cup in January 2018. Casey scored two points out of a possible three and, ahead of the tournament, said he had 'no issues' speaking with 2010 Ryder Cup captain Colin Montgomerie, who infamously overlooked the then world No. 9 for a spot on the European team at Celtic Manor. However, Casey admitted that he was hurt by the omission from Team Europe of the 2010 Ryder Cup, by not scoring sufficient points to qualify for the team, whilst having never questioned the captain's decisions on selecting individual picks for the team. Casey also acknowledged that he was not selected for the Ryder Cup teams in both 2012 and 2014, as he struggled with his golf game then.

Casey won the Valspar Championship in 2018, his first PGA Tour win in nine years.

In September 2018, Casey was named as a captain's pick by Thomas Bjørn for the European team participating in the 2018 Ryder Cup. Europe defeated the U.S. team by a dominant margin of 17.5 to 10.5 at Le Golf National outside Paris, France. Casey went 1–1–1 including a half in his singles match against Brooks Koepka.

Casey missed a chance to win the 2019 AT&T Pebble Beach Pro-Am, when he failed to convert a three-stroke 54-hole lead. He was chased down and passed by Phil Mickelson, who claimed a three-stroke victory. Casey birdied the last during a Monday finish to claim solo second. He did however win the Pro-Am tournament with playing partner Don Colleran.

In March 2019, Casey successfully defended his Valspar Championship title with a one-stroke victory over Jason Kokrak and Louis Oosthuizen, to claim his third PGA Tour title.

In September 2019, Casey won the Porsche European Open at Green Eagle Golf Course in Hamburg, Germany. Casey earned his 14th European Tour victory and his first since winning the KLM Open in 2014.

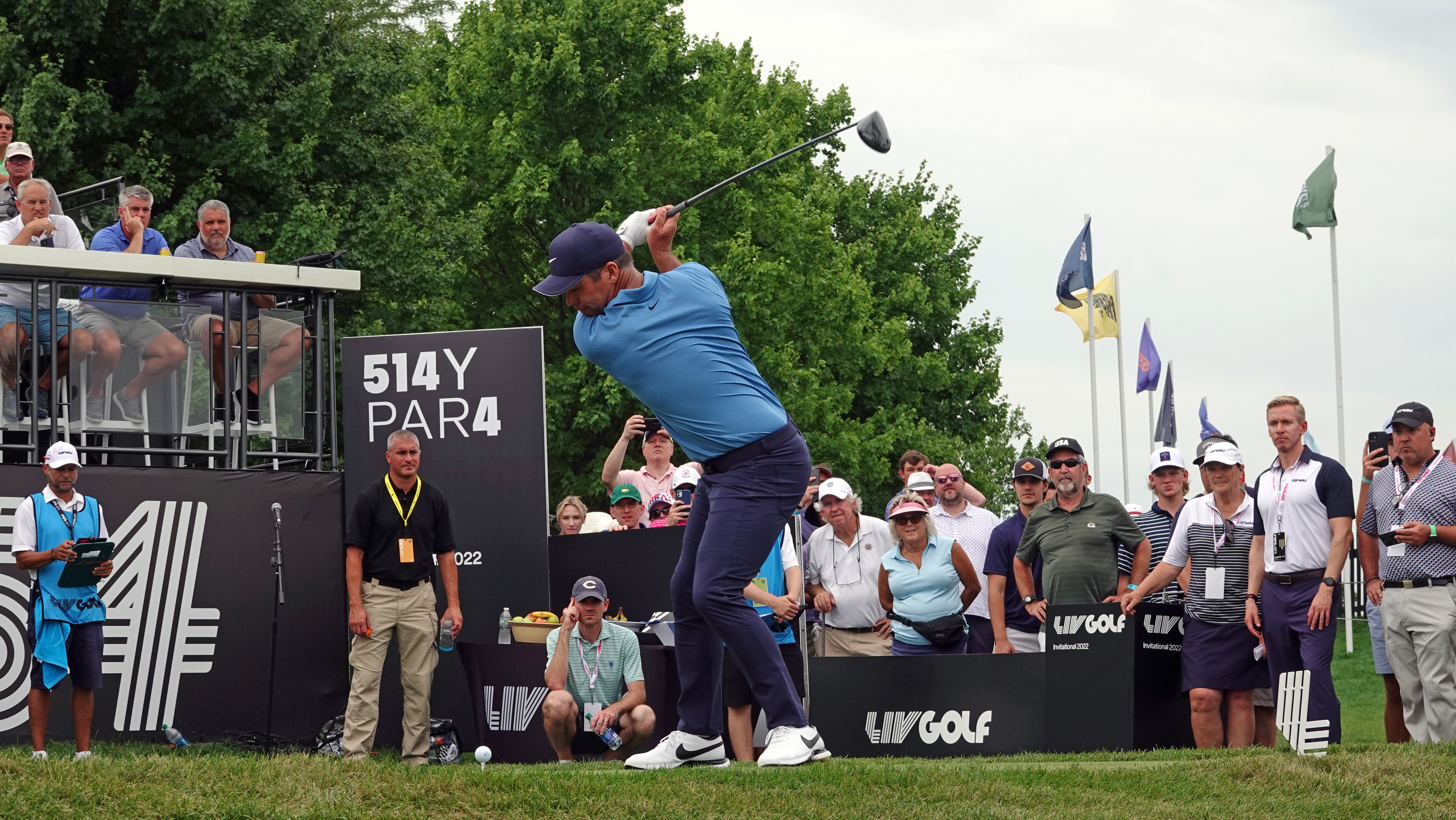
Paul Casey tees off at Trump National in Bedminster, NJ, while competing for LIV Golf. Casey placed 6th at the LIV Golf Invitational Bedminster.

In August 2020, Casey finished tied for second at the 2020 PGA Championship along with Dustin Johnson, both finished two strokes behind Collin Morikawa. This marked his best career finish in a major championship and moved him to 19th in the Official World Golf Ranking.

In November 2020, Casey shot a seven under 65 to hold a share of the first round lead at the Masters. He ultimately finished the tournament T38.

In January 2021, Casey claimed his 15th European Tour victory, at the Omega Dubai Desert Classic, with a four-stroke victory over Brandon Stone. The win saw him move back into the top 20 in the world rankings. In August that year, Casey finished in a tie for 3rd place at the Olympic Games. He lost in a 7-man playoff for the bronze medal.

In September 2021, Casey played on the European team in the 2021 Ryder Cup at Whistling Straits in Kohler, Wisconsin. The U.S. team won 19–9 and Casey went 0–4–0 and including a loss in his Sunday singles match against Dustin Johnson.

=== LIV Golf ===
In July 2022, Casey joined the LIV Golf tour and placed sixth at his first tournament at Trump National Golf Club in Bedminster, New Jersey, winning $648,000 in the process. Casey competes for Crushers GC in LIV Golf. Casey then finished 21st at LIV Golf Invitational Boston, played at The International Golf Club in Bolton, Massachusetts, talking home $171,200. In 2023, Casey's team Crushers GC took home the team event victory at LIV Golf Mexico held at the El Camaleon Golf Course in Mayakoba.

== Personal life ==
In 2008, he married Jocelyn Hefner, a distant cousin of Playboy founder Hugh Hefner. The couple lived a quiet life on a remote ranch in rural Arizona, where keen amateur horse woman Jocelyn competed in local equestrian events. The couple divorced in 2011, citing the impact of the demands of Casey's career on their marriage.

After they met at the Formula 1 Chequered Flag Ball at the 2011 Abu Dhabi Grand Prix, Casey started dating television presenter Pollyanna Woodward. The couple got engaged during the Christmas period in 2013. Soon after, they welcomed their first son in 2014. They married in January 2015.

== Amateur wins ==
- 1998 Pac-10 Championship
- 1999 English Amateur, Pac-10 Championship
- 2000 English Amateur, Pac-10 Championship

== Professional wins (21) ==
=== PGA Tour wins (3) ===
No.	Date	Tournament	Winning score	To par	Margin of victory	Runner(s)-up
1	5 Apr 2009	Shell Houston Open	66-70-69-72=277	−11	Playoff	(United States) J. B. Holmes
2	11 Mar 2018	Valspar Championship	70-68-71-65=274	−10	1 stroke	(United States) Patrick Reed, (United States) Tiger Woods
3	24 Mar 2019	Valspar Championship (2)	70-66-68-72=276	−8	1 stroke	(United States) Jason Kokrak, (South Africa) Louis Oosthuizen

PGA Tour playoff record (1–2)

No.	Year	Tournament	Opponent(s)	Result
1	2009	Shell Houston Open	(United States) J. B. Holmes	Won with bogey on first extra hole
2	2015	Northern Trust Open	(United States) James Hahn, (United States) Dustin Johnson	Hahn won with birdie on third extra hole Casey eliminated by birdie on second hole
3	2015	Travelers Championship	(United States) Bubba Watson	Lost to birdie on second extra hole

=== European Tour wins (15) ===
Legend
Flagship events (1)
Other European Tour (14)

No.	Date	Tournament	Winning score	To par	Margin of victory	Runner(s)-up
1	26 Aug 2001	Gleneagles Scottish PGA Championship	69-69-67-69=274	−14	1 stroke	(Germany) Alex Čejka
2	9 Feb 2003	ANZ Championship^{1}	45 pts (8-10-21-6=45)		4 points	(Australia) Stuart Appleby, (Australia) Nick O'Hern
3	11 May 2003	Benson & Hedges International Open	71-69-66-71=277	−11	4 strokes	(Republic of Ireland) Pádraig Harrington
4	20 Mar 2005	TCL Classic^{2}	64-68-68-66=266	−22	Playoff	(Republic of Ireland) Paul McGinley
5	27 Nov 2005 (2006 season)	Volvo China Open^{2}	71-69-70-65=275	−13	Playoff	(England) Oliver Wilson
6	25 Jun 2006	Johnnie Walker Championship at Gleneagles (2)	67-71-66-72=276	−16	1 stroke	(Denmark) Søren Hansen, (England) Andrew Marshall
7	17 Sep 2006	HSBC World Match Play Championship	10 and 8			(United States) Shaun Micheel
8	21 Jan 2007	Abu Dhabi Golf Championship	71-68-67-65=271	−17	1 stroke	(Sweden) Peter Hanson, (Spain) Miguel Ángel Jiménez
9	18 Jan 2009	Abu Dhabi Golf Championship (2)	69-65-63-70=267	−21	1 stroke	(Germany) Martin Kaymer, (South Africa) Louis Oosthuizen
10	24 May 2009	BMW PGA Championship	69-67-67-68=271	−17	1 stroke	(England) Ross Fisher
11	30 Jan 2011	Volvo Golf Champions	67-67-66-68=268	−20	1 stroke	(Sweden) Peter Hanson, (Spain) Miguel Ángel Jiménez
12	30 Jun 2013	Irish Open	68-72-67-67=274	−14	3 strokes	(Netherlands) Joost Luiten, (England) Robert Rock
13	14 Sep 2014	KLM Open	68-70-62-66=266	−14	1 stroke	(England) Simon Dyson
14	8 Sep 2019	Porsche European Open	66-73-69-66=274	−14	1 stroke	(Scotland) Robert MacIntyre, (Germany) Bernd Ritthammer, (Austria) Matthias Schwab
15	31 Jan 2021	Omega Dubai Desert Classic	67-70-64-70=271	−17	4 strokes	(South Africa) Brandon Stone

^{1}Co-sanctioned by the PGA Tour of Australasia
^{2}Co-sanctioned by the Asian Tour

European Tour playoff record (2–2)

No.	Year	Tournament	Opponent	Result
1	2004	Celtic Manor Wales Open	(England) Simon Khan	Lost to birdie on second extra hole
2	2005	TCL Classic	(Republic of Ireland) Paul McGinley	Won with birdie on second extra hole
3	2005	Volvo China Open	(England) Oliver Wilson	Won with birdie on first extra hole
4	2026	Omega European Masters	(South Africa) Thriston Lawrence	Lost to birdie on fourth extra hole

=== Asian Tour wins (2) ===
No.	Date	Tournament	Winning score	To par	Margin of victory	Runner-up
1	20 Mar 2005	TCL Classic^{2}	64-68-68-66=266	−22	Playoff	(Republic of Ireland) Paul McGinley
2	27 Nov 2005	Volvo China Open^{2}	71-69-70-65=275	−13	Playoff	(England) Oliver Wilson

Asian Tour playoff record (2–0)

No.	Year	Tournament	Opponent	Result
1	2005	TCL Classic	(Republic of Ireland) Paul McGinley	Won with birdie on second extra hole
2	2005	Volvo China Open	(England) Oliver Wilson	Won with birdie on first extra hole

=== Korean Tour wins (1) ===
No.	Date	Tournament	Winning score	To par	Margin of victory	Runners-up
1	2 Oct 2011	Shinhan Donghae Open	77-73-69-69=288	E	1 stroke	(South Korea) Kang Sung-hoon, (South Korea) Kim Kyung-tae

=== Other wins (2) ===
Legend
World Golf Championships (1)
Other wins (1)

No.	Year	Tournament	Winning score	To par	Margin of victory	Runner(s)-up
1	21 Nov 2004	WGC-World Cup (with (England) Luke Donald)	61-64-68-64=257	−31	1 stroke	Spain − Sergio García and Miguel Ángel Jiménez
2	31 Jul 2012	Telus World Skins Game	$185,000		$100,000	(Venezuela) Jhonattan Vegas

== Playoff record ==
LIV Golf League playoff record (0–2)

No.	Year	Tournament	Opponents	Result
1	2024	LIV Golf Hong Kong	(Mexico) Abraham Ancer, (Australia) Cameron Smith	Ancer won with birdie on first extra hole
2	2025	LIV Golf Dallas	(Japan) Jinichiro Kozuma, (South Africa) Louis Oosthuizen, (United States) Patrick Reed	Reed won with birdie on first extra hole

== Results in major championships ==
Results not in chronological order in 2020.

Tournament	2002	2003	2004	2005	2006	2007	2008	2009
Masters Tournament			T6	CUT		T10	T11	T20
U.S. Open		CUT	CUT	WD	15	T10	T65	CUT
The Open Championship	CUT	CUT	T20	CUT	71	T27	T7	T47
PGA Championship	CUT	66	CUT	T59	CUT	T40	T15	

Tournament	2010	2011	2012	2013	2014	2015	2016	2017	2018
Masters Tournament	CUT	T38	CUT			T6	T4	6	T15
U.S. Open	T40	CUT		T45	T56	T39	CUT	26	T16
The Open Championship	T3	T54	CUT		T47	T74	CUT	T11	T51
PGA Championship	T12	T72	CUT	T33	CUT	T30	T10	T13	CUT

Tournament	2019	2020	2021	2022
Masters Tournament	CUT	T38	T26	
PGA Championship	T29	T2	T4	
U.S. Open	T21	T17	T7	
The Open Championship	T57	NT	T15	T53

Top 10
Did not play

WD = withdrew
CUT = missed the half-way cut
"T" = tied
NT = No tournament due to COVID-19 pandemic

=== Summary ===
Tournament	Wins	2nd	3rd	Top-5	Top-10	Top-25	Events	Cuts made
Masters Tournament	0	0	0	1	5	8	15	11
PGA Championship	0	1	0	2	3	6	19	13
U.S. Open	0	0	0	0	2	6	18	12
The Open Championship	0	0	1	1	2	5	19	14
Totals	0	1	1	4	12	25	71	50

- Most consecutive cuts made – 11 (2019 PGA – 2022 Open Championship, current)
- Longest streak of top-10s – 2 (three times)

== Results in The Players Championship ==
Tournament	2004	2005	2006	2007	2008	2009
The Players Championship	T10	CUT		CUT	CUT	T14

Tournament	2010	2011	2012	2013	2014	2015	2016	2017	2018	2019
The Players Championship	CUT	CUT	WD			WD	T23	T22		CUT

Tournament	2020	2021	2022
The Players Championship	C	T5	3

Top 10
Did not play

CUT = missed the halfway cut
WD = withdrew
"T" indicates a tie for a place
C = Cancelled after the first round due to the COVID-19 pandemic

== Results in World Golf Championships ==
Results not in chronological order before 2015.

Tournament	2003	2004	2005	2006	2007	2008	2009	2010	2011	2012	2013	2014	2015	2016	2017	2018	2019
Championship	T8	T21		T56	T9	T51	T31	T6	T18	T51			T38	7	T16	T12	T3
Match Play	R64	R64	R64	R64	QF	R16	2	2	R32				QF	T51	R16	T17	R16
Invitational	T17	T16	T19	T4	T51	T8	WD	T22	T45		T27		T17	T16	T5	T31	T27
Champions							WD	T6	T4		20		T23	T12	T11	T16	T38

Tournament	2020	2021	2022
Championship	11		
Match Play	NT^{1}	T28	T60
Invitational	T67	T5	
Champions	NT^{1}	NT^{1}	NT^{1}

^{1}Cancelled due to COVID-19 pandemic

Top 10
Did not play

WD = Withdrew
QF, R16, R32, R64 = Round in which player lost in match play
NT = no tournament
"T" = tied
Note that the HSBC Champions did not become a WGC event until 2009.
Note that the Championship and Invitational were discontinued from 2022.

== Team appearances ==
Amateur

- Walker Cup (representing Great Britain & Ireland): 1999 (winners)
- Eisenhower Trophy (representing Great Britain & Ireland): 2000
- St Andrews Trophy (representing Great Britain & Ireland): 2000 (winners)

Professional

- Ryder Cup (representing Europe): 2004 (winners), 2006 (winners), 2008, 2018 (winners), 2021
- WGC-World Cup (representing England): 2001, 2002, 2003, 2004 (winners)
- Seve Trophy (representing Great Britain & Ireland): 2002 (winners), 2003 (winners), 2005 (winners), 2007 (winners), 2013
- EurAsia Cup (representing Europe): 2018 (winners)

== See also ==
- List of golfers with most European Tour wins
