= Simon Dyson =

English professional golfer

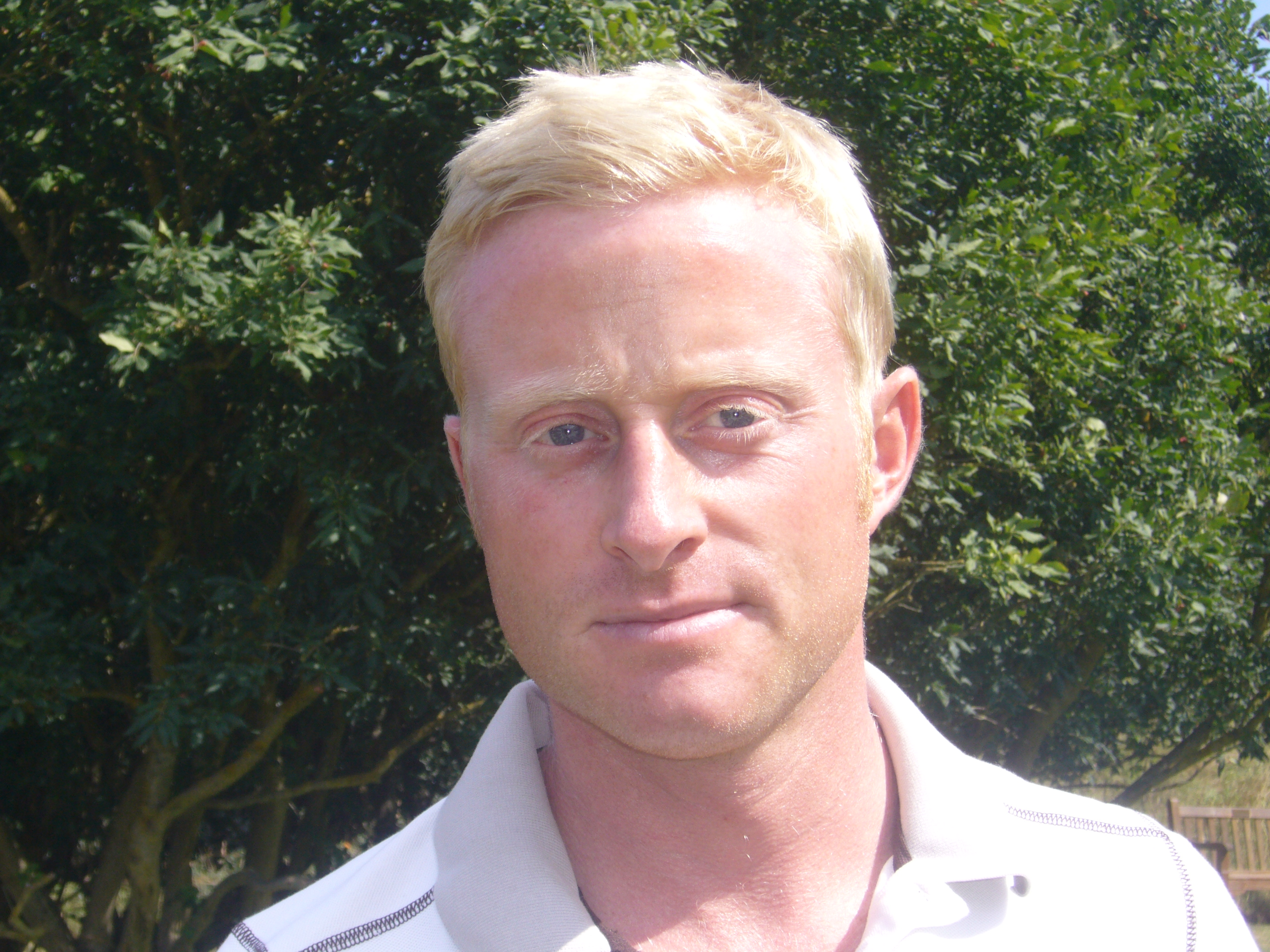
- Dyson in August 2009

Personal information
- Full name: Simon John Dyson
- Nationality: England
- Born: 21 December 1977 (age 48) York, England
- Height: 5 ft 10 in (1.78 m)
- Weight: 171 lb (78 kg; 12.2 st)
- Spouse: Lyndsey Dyson

Career
- Sport: Golf
- Turned professional: 1999
- Former tours: European Tour; Asian Tour
- Professional wins: 9
- Highest ranking: 26 (29 January 2012)

Number of wins by tour
- European Tour: 6
- Asian Tour: 4

Best results in major championships
- Masters Tournament: CUT: 2010, 2012
- PGA Championship: T6: 2007
- U.S. Open: T51: 2012
- The Open Championship: T9: 2011

Achievements and awards
- Asian PGA Tour Order of Merit winner: 2000
- Asian PGA Tour Players' Player of the Year: 2000
- Asian PGA Tour Rookie of the Year: 2000

Simon John Dyson (born 21 December 1977) is an English professional golfer. He played on the European Tour from 2001 to 2017, having played on the Asian Tour in 2000 and winning the Order of Merit. He had six wins on the European Tour, including the KLM Open three times.

After struggling with a wrist injury he retired from competitive golf in early 2019.

== Amateur career ==
In 1999, Dyson was runner-up to Paul Casey in the English Amateur and won the Finnish Amateur title. He was also a member of the Great Britain & Ireland Walker Cup team that year, before turning professional in September.

== Professional career ==
In 2000, Dyson topped the Asian Tour Order of Merit after winning three tournaments on that tour, and was also Rookie of the Year. He also played a small number of events on the European Tour in 2000. From 2001 to 2014 he played mainly on the European Tour, and finished in the top 100 on the Order of Merit 13 times, the only exception being in 2003.

In March 2006 Dyson won his maiden European Tour title at the Enjoy Jakarta Indonesia Open and followed up later that year by winning the KLM Open in a playoff over Richard Green. These victories helped him to finish 21st on the Order of Merit and climb into the top 100 of the Official World Golf Rankings for the first time in his career.

Dyson nearly won the season ending Volvo Masters tournament at Valderrama in 2007, when he was involved in a three-man sudden death playoff for the championship with Soren Kjeldsen and Justin Rose. After the trio all parred the first playoff hole, they all found the green at the second playoff hole to leave birdie chances. However both Kjeldsen and Dyson rolled their efforts passed the hole, whilst the 2007 Order of Merit winner, Rose holed his for the championship.

His most successful year came in 2009 when he won the KLM Open for a second time, again at the first playoff hole, like he did in 2006, this time defeating Peter Hedblom and Peter Lawrie. The victory came after a final round 63 made sure of a place in the three-man playoff. In October Dyson shot a six-under final round of 66 to take victory at the Alfred Dunhill Links Championship. Dyson finished the season ranked 8th on the Race to Dubai standings.

In July 2011, Dyson won for the fifth time on the European Tour at the Irish Open. When Dyson finished his round with a 67, he was the co-leader with Richard Green, who was one group behind him. Dyson even had a putt on the 18th to go one stroke clear, but it slipped past the edge of the hole. However, when Green only found the front edge of the 18th green with his approach shot, he took three putts to get down for his bogey meaning that Dyson was the outright winner by one stroke. This win elevated Dyson to 9th on the Race to Dubai list and earned him a place in the following week's WGC-Bridgestone Invitational. Dyson also broke into the Official World Golf Ranking top 50. In September 2011, Dyson won his third KLM Open title to move into the world's top 30 for the first time. Dyson finished the season ranked 10th on the Race to Dubai standings.

Dyson finished 50th in Order of Merit in 2012, 72nd in 2013 and 41st in 2014. His best finish during these three years was runner-up in the 2014 KLM Open. In 2013 Dyson was disqualified from the BMW Masters for submitting an incorrect score after it was determined that he should have been assessed a two stroke penalty for tapping down a spike mark during the second round, in violation of the rules. He was later fined £30,000 and given a suspended two-month ban from the European Tour after they determined that, although his actions were considered to be a serious breach of the rules, they were not premeditated.

Dyson suffered a wrist tendon injury early in 2015 which ultimately required surgery and resulted in him missing much of that season. He played on the European Tour in 2016 and 2017 but was never able to return to the form he showed earlier in his career, dropping down to the second tier Challenge Tour for the 2018 season where he again struggled to compete. In 2019 he decided to take a break from tournament golf.

== Personal life ==
Dyson was born in York. He lives in Manchester with his wife Lyndsey. The couple were married in December 2010. Dyson is the nephew of Terry Dyson, a former footballer.

== Amateur wins ==
- 1999 Finnish Amateur Championship

== Professional wins (9) ==
=== European Tour wins (6) ===
No.	Date	Tournament	Winning score	Margin of victory	Runner(s)-up
1	5 Mar 2006	Enjoy Jakarta HSBC Indonesia Open^{1}	−20 (66-68-67-67=268)	2 strokes	(Australia) Andrew Buckle
2	13 Aug 2006	KLM Open	−14 (67-71-66-66=270)	Playoff	(Australia) Richard Green
3	23 Aug 2009	KLM Open (2)	−15 (67-67-68-63=265)	Playoff	(Sweden) Peter Hedblom, (Republic of Ireland) Peter Lawrie
4	5 Oct 2009	Alfred Dunhill Links Championship	−20 (68-66-68-66=268)	3 strokes	(Northern Ireland) Rory McIlroy, (England) Oliver Wilson
5	31 Jul 2011	Irish Open	−15 (70-65-67-67=269)	1 stroke	(Australia) Richard Green
6	11 Sep 2011	KLM Open (3)	−12 (65-66-71-66=268)	1 stroke	(England) David Lynn

^{1}Co-sanctioned by the Asian Tour

European Tour playoff record (2–1)

No.	Year	Tournament	Opponent(s)	Result
1	2006	KLM Open	(Australia) Richard Green	Won with birdie on first extra hole
2	2007	Volvo Masters	(Denmark) Søren Kjeldsen, (England) Justin Rose	Rose won with birdie on second extra hole
3	2009	KLM Open	(Sweden) Peter Hedblom, (Republic of Ireland) Peter Lawrie	Won with birdie on first extra hole

=== Asian Tour wins (4) ===
No.	Date	Tournament	Winning score	Margin of victory	Runner(s)-up
1	14 May 2000	Macau Open	−15 (64-70-68-67=269)	2 strokes	(United States) Andrew Pitts, (South Korea) Yang Yong-eun
2	21 May 2000	Volvo China Open	−13 (66-69-69-71=275)	1 stroke	(India) Jyoti Randhawa
3	17 Dec 2000	Omega Hong Kong Open	−21 (64-67-68-64=263)	3 strokes	(Australia) Kim Felton, (United States) John Kernohan, (South Korea) Charlie Wi
4	5 Mar 2006	Enjoy Jakarta HSBC Indonesia Open^{1}	−20 (66-68-67-67=268)	2 strokes	(Australia) Andrew Buckle

^{1}Co-sanctioned by the European Tour

== Results in major championships ==
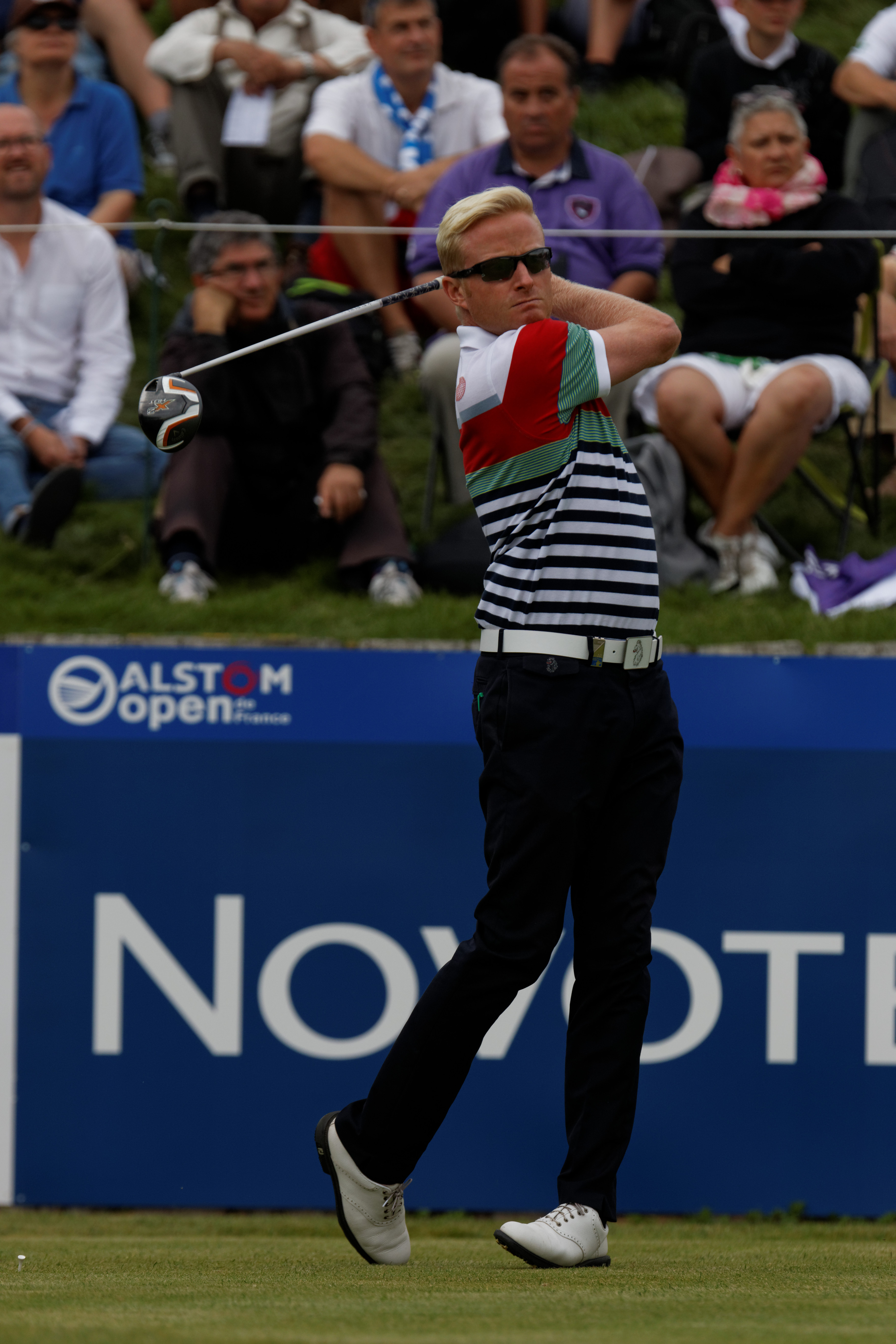
Simon Dyson

Tournament	2000	2001	2002	2003	2004	2005	2006	2007	2008	2009	2010	2011	2012
Masters Tournament											CUT		CUT
U.S. Open						CUT				CUT	CUT		T51
The Open Championship	CUT	CUT			CUT	T34	T48		CUT		T48	T9	T23
PGA Championship								T6	CUT		T12	T51	CUT

Top 10
Did not play

CUT = missed the half-way cut
"T" = tied

=== Summary ===
Tournament	Wins	2nd	3rd	Top-5	Top-10	Top-25	Events	Cuts made
Masters Tournament	0	0	0	0	0	0	2	0
U.S. Open	0	0	0	0	0	0	4	1
The Open Championship	0	0	0	0	1	2	9	5
PGA Championship	0	0	0	0	1	2	5	3
Totals	0	0	0	0	2	4	20	9

- Most consecutive cuts made – 4 (2010 Open Championship – 2011 PGA)
- Longest streak of top-10s – 1 (twice)

== Results in The Players Championship ==
Tournament	2012
The Players Championship	WD

WD = withdrew

== Results in World Golf Championships ==
Tournament	2006	2007	2008	2009	2010	2011	2012
Match Play					R64		R64
Championship	T38				T50		72
Invitational					T71	T33	T16
Champions				T28		T16	

Did not play

QF, R16, R32, R64 = Round in which player lost in match play
"T" = Tied
Note that the HSBC Champions did not become a WGC event until 2009.

== Team appearances ==
Amateur

- European Youths' Team Championship (representing England): 1998
- St Andrews Trophy (representing Great Britain & Ireland): 1998
- European Amateur Team Championship (representing England): 1999
- Walker Cup (representing Great Britain & Ireland): 1999 (winners)

Professional

- Seve Trophy (representing Great Britain & Ireland): 2007 (winners), 2009 (winners), 2011 (winners)
- Royal Trophy (representing Europe): 2010 (winners)
