= 2002 Volvo PGA Championship =

Tournament information
- Dates: 23–26 May 2002
- Location: Virginia Water, Surrey, England; 51.40°N 0.59°W
- Courses: Wentworth Club; West Course
- Tour: European Tour

Statistics
- Par: 72
- Length: 7,073 yards (6,468 m)
- Field: 156 players, 76 after cut
- Cut: 144 (E)
- Prize fund: €3,200,000
- Winner's share: €528,710

Champion
- (Denmark) Anders Hansen
- 269 (−19)

Location map
- Location in England Location in Surrey

The 2002 Volvo PGA Championship was the 48th edition of the Volvo PGA Championship, an annual professional golf tournament on the European Tour. It was held 23–26 May at the West Course of Wentworth Club in Virginia Water, Surrey, England, a suburb southwest of London.

Anders Hansen won by five strokes over Colin Montgomerie and Eduardo Romero to claim his first Volvo PGA Championship.

== Course layout ==
Wentworth Club, West Course
Tee	Rating/Slope	1	2	3	4	5	6	7	8	9	Out	10	11	12	13	14	15	16	17	18	In	Total
Yardage	n/a	474	154	447	496	191	354	396	400	452	3,364	184	404	509	467	179	481	383	571	531	3,709	7,073
Par		4	3	4	5	3	4	4	4	4	35	3	4	5	4	3	4	4	5	5	37	72

== Round summaries ==
=== First round ===
Thursday, 23 May 2002

Place	Player	Score	To par
1	(Scotland) Colin Montgomerie	64	−8
T2	(Scotland) Andrew Coltart	67	−5
T2	(Zimbabwe) Mark McNulty	67	−5
T2	(Argentina) Eduardo Romero	67	−5
T2	(Denmark) Steen Tinning	67	−5
T6	(Spain) Diego Borrego	68	−4
T6	(New Zealand) Michael Campbell	68	−4
T6	(England) Gary Evans	68	−4
T6	(England) David Gilford	68	−4
T6	(United States) Tom Gillis	68	−4
T6	(Denmark) Anders Hansen	68	−4
T6	(Sweden) Robert Karlsson	68	−4
T6	(Australia) Stephen Leaney	68	−4
T6	(Spain) José María Olazábal	68	−4
T6	(Scotland) Andrew Oldcorn	68	−4
T6	(Australia) Lucas Parsons	68	−4
T6	(Northern Ireland) Ronan Rafferty	68	−4
T6	(England) David J. Russell	68	−4
T6	(New Zealand) Greg Turner	68	−4

=== Second round ===
Friday, 24 May 2002

Place	Player	Score	To par
1	(Denmark) Anders Hansen	68-65=133	−11
T2	(Scotland) Colin Montgomerie	64-71=135	−9
T2	(Argentina) Eduardo Romero	67-68=135	−9
T4	(Zimbabwe) Mark McNulty	67-69=136	−8
T4	(Spain) Carlos Rodiles	69-67=135	−8
6	(New Zealand) Michael Campbell	68-70=138	−6
T7	(England) John Bickerton	71-68=139	−5
T7	(England) Nick Faldo	71-68=139	−5
T7	(Scotland) Alastair Forsyth	71-68=139	−5
T7	(England) David Gilford	68-71=139	−5
T7	(Australia) Stephen Leaney	68-71=139	−5
T7	(Scotland) Sam Torrance	71-68=139	−5
T7	(New Zealand) Greg Turner	68-71=139	−5

=== Third round ===
Saturday, 25 May 2002

Place	Player	Score	To par
1	(Denmark) Anders Hansen	68-65-66=199	−17
2	(Spain) Carlos Rodiles	69-67-68=204	−12
3	(Argentina) Eduardo Romero	67-68-71=206	−10
T4	(England) Nick Faldo	71-68-68=207	−9
T4	(Zimbabwe) Mark McNulty	67-69-71=207	−9
T4	(Scotland) Colin Montgomerie	64-71-72=207	−9
T7	(England) Peter Baker	70-70-68=208	−8
T7	(Netherlands) Maarten Lafeber	71-70-67=208	−8
T7	(New Zealand) Greg Turner	68-71-69=208	−8
T10	(New Zealand) Michael Campbell	68-70-71=209	−7
T10	(Spain) Ignacio Garrido	69-71-69=209	−7
T10	(England) David Gilford	68-71-70=209	−7
T10	(Australia) Peter O'Malley	69-71-69=209	−7

=== Final round ===
Sunday, 26 May 2002

Place	Player	Score	To par	Money (€)
1	(Denmark) Anders Hansen	68-65-66-70=269	−19	528,708
T2	(Scotland) Colin Montgomerie	64-71-72-67=274	−14	275,528
T2	(Argentina) Eduardo Romero	67-68-71-68=274	−14	275,528
T4	(New Zealand) Michael Campbell	68-70-71-67=276	−12	134,716
T4	(England) Nick Faldo	71-68-68-69=276	−12	134,716
T4	(Spain) Carlos Rodiles	69-67-68-72=276	−12	134,716
T7	(Northern Ireland) Darren Clarke	70-71-69-67=277	−11	87,238
T7	(Australia) Jarrod Moseley	71-73-70-63=277	−11	87,238
T9	(England) David Gilford	68-71-70-70=279	−9	67,252
T9	(Australia) Peter O'Malley	69-71-69-70=279	−9	67,252

==== Scorecard ====
Hole	1	2	3	4	5	6	7	8	9	10	11	12	13	14	15	16	17	18
Par	4	3	4	5	3	4	4	4	4	3	4	5	4	3	4	4	5	5
(Denmark) Hansen	−17	−18	−17	−18	−18	−18	−18	−18	−18	−19	−19	−18	−18	−19	−18	−18	−19	−19
(Scotland) Montgomerie	−9	−9	−9	−10	−10	−10	−11	−10	−10	−11	−12	−13	−12	−12	−12	−12	−13	−14
(Argentina) Romero	−11	−11	−12	−10	−10	−10	−10	−10	−10	−11	−12	−14	−14	−14	−13	−13	−13	−14
(New Zealand) Campbell	−6	−6	−6	−6	−7	−8	−8	−8	−8	−7	−8	−9	−9	−9	−10	−10	−11	−12
(England) Faldo	−8	−9	−9	−9	−10	−11	−11	−11	−10	−11	−10	−11	−12	−12	−11	−11	−11	−12
(Spain) Rodiles	−12	−12	−12	−12	−12	−12	−11	−11	−11	−11	−12	−13	−12	−12	−12	−12	−13	−12

Cumulative tournament scores, relative to par

Eagle	Birdie	Bogey	Double bogey
