= 2005 BMW Championship =

Tournament information
- Dates: 26–29 May 2005
- Location: Virginia Water, Surrey, England; 51.40°N 0.59°W
- Courses: Wentworth Club; West Course
- Tour: European Tour

Statistics
- Par: 72
- Length: 7,073 yards (6,468 m)
- Field: 150 players, 71 after cut
- Cut: 144 (E)
- Prize fund: €4,000,000
- Winner's share: €666,660

Champion
- (Argentina) Ángel Cabrera
- 273 (−15)
- Location in England Location in Surrey

The 2005 BMW Championship was the 51st edition of the BMW Championship, an annual professional golf tournament on the European Tour. It was held 26–29 May at the West Course of Wentworth Club in Virginia Water, Surrey, England, a suburb southwest of London.

It was the first year the event's sponsorship had been taken on by BMW, after Volvo's contract to sponsor the event had expired.

Ángel Cabrera won by two strokes ahead of Paul McGinley, having had two previous runner-up finishes in the event.

== Course layout ==
Wentworth Club, West Course
Tee	Rating/Slope	1	2	3	4	5	6	7	8	9	Out	10	11	12	13	14	15	16	17	18	In	Total
Yardage	n/a	474	154	447	496	191	354	396	400	452	3,364	184	404	509	467	179	481	383	571	531	3,709	7,073
Par		4	3	4	5	3	4	4	4	4	35	3	4	5	4	3	4	4	5	5	37	72

== Round summaries ==
=== First round ===
Thursday, 26 May 2005

Place	Player	Score	To par
T1	(Republic of Ireland) Peter Lawrie	67	−5
T1	(Portugal) José-Filipe Lima	67	−5
T1	(Northern Ireland) Graeme McDowell	67	−5
T4	(United States) Ben Curtis	68	−4
T4	(Australia) Peter Fowler	68	−4
T4	(Australia) Marcus Fraser	68	−4
T4	(Sweden) Peter Hedblom	68	−4
T4	(Australia) Nick O'Hern	68	−4
T4	(Sweden) Mårten Olander	68	−4
T4	(Scotland) Andrew Oldcorn	68	−4
T4	(Australia) Wade Ormsby	68	−4

=== Second round ===
Friday, 27 May 2005

Place	Player	Score	To par
1	(Sweden) Peter Hedblom	68-65=133	−11
2	(Republic of Ireland) Paul McGinley	72-64=136	−8
3	(Australia) Nick O'Hern	68-69=137	−7
T4	(Sweden) Peter Hanson	69-69=138	−6
T4	(Republic of Ireland) Pádraig Harrington	70-68=138	−6
T6	(New Zealand) Michael Campbell	71-68=139	−5
T6	(United States) Ben Curtis	68-71=139	−5
T6	(Thailand) Thongchai Jaidee	72-67=139	−5
T6	(Australia) Peter Lonard	69-70=139	−5
T6	(England) Lee Slattery	70-69=139	−5

=== Third round ===
Saturday, 28 May 2005

Place	Player	Score	To par
T1	(Argentina) Ángel Cabrera	70-70-66=206	−10
T1	(Sweden) Peter Hedblom	68-65-73=206	−10
T3	(England) David Howell	70-72-66=208	−8
T3	(Republic of Ireland) Paul McGinley	72-64-72=208	−8
T5	(New Zealand) Michael Campbell	71-68-71=210	−6
T5	(Sweden) Peter Hanson	69-69-72=210	−6
T5	(Thailand) Thongchai Jaidee	72-67-71=210	−6
T5	(Sweden) Mårten Olander	68-72-70=210	−6
T9	(Wales) Bradley Dredge	75-68-69=212	−4
T9	(South Africa) Retief Goosen	70-70-72=212	−4
T9	(Republic of Ireland) Pádraig Harrington	70-68-74=212	−4
T9	(Republic of Ireland) Damien McGrane	69-71-72=212	−4
T9	(Republic of Ireland) Gary Murphy	74-68-70=212	−4
T9	(Spain) José María Olazábal	72-69-71=212	−4

=== Final round ===
Sunday, 29 May 2005

Place	Player	Score	To par	Money (€)
1	(Argentina) Ángel Cabrera	70-70-66-67=273	−15	666,660
2	(Republic of Ireland) Paul McGinley	72-64-72-67=275	−13	444,440
3	(Australia) Nick O'Hern	68-69-76-64=277	−11	250,400
4	(England) David Howell	70-72-66-71=279	−9	200,000
T5	(Sweden) Peter Hanson	69-69-72-70=280	−8	143,200
T5	(Sweden) Peter Hedblom	68-65-73-74=280	−8	143,200
T5	(Sweden) Mårten Olander	68-72-70-70=280	−8	143,200
T8	(New Zealand) Michael Campbell	71-68-71-71=281	−7	94,800
T8	(Wales) Jamie Donaldson	73-71-69-68=281	−7	94,800
10	(Wales) Bradley Dredge	75-68-69-70=282	−6	80,000

==== Scorecard ====
Hole	1	2	3	4	5	6	7	8	9	10	11	12	13	14	15	16	17	18
Par	4	3	4	5	3	4	4	4	4	3	4	5	4	3	4	4	5	5
(Argentina) Cabrera	−10	−11	−10	−12	−12	−12	−12	−12	−12	−12	−13	−14	−14	−14	−14	−15	−15	−15
(Republic of Ireland) McGinley	−8	−8	−9	−10	−11	−12	−12	−13	−13	−13	−13	−14	−14	−14	−14	−13	−12	−13
(Australia) O'Hern	−2	−3	−3	−5	−5	−5	−6	−7	−7	−7	−7	−9	−9	−9	−9	−10	−10	−11
(England) Howell	−8	−8	−8	−9	−9	−9	−9	−9	−9	−9	−9	−9	−9	−9	−9	−9	−9	−9
(Sweden) Hanson	−6	−6	−6	−6	−6	−7	−7	−7	−7	−7	−7	−7	−7	−8	−7	−6	−7	−8
(Sweden) Hedblom	−10	−10	−9	−10	−10	−10	−10	−10	−9	−9	−9	−8	−7	−7	−6	−7	−7	−8
(Sweden) Olander	−6	−6	−6	−7	−7	−7	−7	−7	−6	−6	−6	−7	−6	−6	−6	−7	−8	−8

Cumulative tournament scores, relative to par

Eagle	Birdie	Bogey
