= 1995 Volvo PGA Championship =

Tournament information
- Dates: 26–29 May 1995
- Location: Virginia Water, Surrey, England; 51.40°N 0.59°W
- Courses: Wentworth Club; West Course
- Tour: European Tour

Statistics
- Par: 72
- Field: 150 players, 67 after cut
- Cut: 145 (+1)
- Prize fund: €902,698
- Winner's share: €210,000

Champion
- (Germany) Bernhard Langer
- 279 (−9)

Location map
- Location in England Location in Surrey

The 1995 Volvo PGA Championship was the 41st edition of the Volvo PGA Championship, an annual professional golf tournament on the European Tour. It was held 26–29 May at the West Course of Wentworth Club in Virginia Water, Surrey, England, a suburb southwest of London.

Bernhard Langer won his third Volvo PGA Championship with a two stroke victory over Nick Faldo and Paul Lawrie.

== Round summaries ==
=== First round ===
Thursday, 26 May 1995

Place	Player	Score	To par
1	(Australia) Peter Senior	66	−6
T2	(England) Nick Faldo	67	−5
T2	(Germany) Bernhard Langer	67	−5
T4	(New Zealand) Frank Nobilo	68	−4
T4	(Sweden) Jesper Parnevik	68	−4
T4	(England) Andrew Sherborne	68	−4
T7	(New Zealand) Michael Campbell	69	−3
T7	(Spain) José María Cañizares	69	−3
T7	(England) Peter Mitchell	69	−3
T7	(Spain) José María Olazábal	69	−3
T7	(Australia) Wayne Riley	69	−3
T7	(Germany) Sven Strüver	69	−3

=== Second round ===
Friday, 27 May 1995

Place	Player	Score	To par
1	(New Zealand) Frank Nobilo	68-68=136	−8
T2	(Scotland) Gary Orr	70-67=137	−7
T2	(England) Andrew Sherborne	68-69=137	−7
T4	(Germany) Sven Strüver	69-69=138	−6
T4	(Republic of Ireland) Philip Walton	70-68=138	−6
T6	(Spain) José María Cañizares	69-70=139	−5
T6	(England) Nick Faldo	67-72=139	−5
T6	(South Africa) Retief Goosen	72-67=139	−5
T6	(Australia) Peter Senior	66-73=139	−5
T10	(Sweden) Per-Ulrik Johansson	71-69=150	−4
T10	(Germany) Bernhard Langer	67-73=140	−4
T10	(France) Thomas Levet	72-68=140	−4
T10	(Spain) José Rivero	74-66=140	−4

=== Third round ===
Saturday, 28 May 1995

Place	Player	Score	To par
T1	(Germany) Bernhard Langer	67-73-68=208	−8
T1	(Wales) Mark Mouland	72-71-65=208	−8
T3	(Sweden) Per-Ulrik Johansson	71-69-69=209	−7
T3	(England) Andrew Sherborne	68-69-72=209	−7
T5	(Spain) José María Cañizares	69-70-71=210	−6
T5	(England) Nick Faldo	67-72-71=210	−6
T7	(France) Thomas Levet	72-68-71=211	−5
T7	(Scotland) Colin Montgomerie	70-72-69=211	−5
T7	(Sweden) Jesper Parnevik	68-73-70=211	−5
T10	(France) Michel Besanceney	70-71-71=212	−4
T10	(Italy) Silvio Grappasonni	72-69-71=212	−4
T10	(England) Mark James	73-72-67=212	−4
T10	(Scotland) Gary Orr	70-67-75=212	−4
T10	(Australia) Peter Senior	66-73-73=212	−4
T10	(Germany) Sven Strüver	69-69-74=212	−4
T10	(Republic of Ireland) Philip Walton	70-68-74=212	−4

=== Final round ===
Sunday, 29 May 1995

Place	Player	Score	To par	Money (€)
1	(Germany) Bernhard Langer	67-73-68-71=279	−9	210,000
T2	(New Zealand) Michael Campbell	69-73-71-67=280	−8	109,431
T2	(Sweden) Per-Ulrik Johansson	71-69-69-71=280	−8	109,431
T4	(France) Thomas Levet	72-68-71-71=282	−6	45,959
T4	(Australia) Peter O'Malley	74-71-70-67=282	−6	45,959
T4	(Sweden) Jesper Parnevik	68-73-70-71=282	−6	45,959
T4	(Australia) Peter Senior	66-73-73-70=282	−6	45,959
T4	(England) Andrew Sherborne	68-69-72-73=282	−6	45,959
T9	(Italy) Silvio Grappasonni	72-69-71-71=283	−5	25,485
T9	(Scotland) Colin Montgomerie	70-72-69-72=283	−5	25,485
T9	(Wales) Mark Mouland	72-71-65-75=283	−5	25,485
