= 2007 HSBC World Match Play Championship =

Coordinates: 51°23′48″N 0°35′45″W

Tournament information
- Dates: 11–14 October 2007
- Location: Virginia Water, Surrey, England
- Course(s): Wentworth Club
- Tour(s): European Tour
- Format: Match play – 36 holes

Statistics
- Par: 72
- Length: 7,308 yards (6,682 m)
- Field: 16 players
- Prize fund: £1,660,000
- Winner's share: £1,000,000

Champion
- (South Africa) Ernie Els
- def. Ángel Cabrera 6 & 4

The 2007 HSBC World Match Play Championship was the 44th HSBC World Match Play Championship played and the 4th time played as an official European Tour event. It was from 11 October to 14 October at The Wentworth Club. The champion received €1,443,830 (£1,000,000 or $2,042,513.20) making it the biggest first prize in golf. Each match was played over 36 holes. Ernie Els defeated Ángel Cabrera 6&4 in the final to win the tournament for the 7th time.

== Qualification ==
1. Defending champion: Paul Casey
2. World #1 from the Official World Golf Rankings as of 1 January 2007: Tiger Woods (declined invitation)
3. The leading 10 available players from the "HSBC Major Tournaments Ranking" at the end of the 2007 PGA Championship on 13 August 2007: Pádraig Harrington (2), Ángel Cabrera (4), Ernie Els (6), Woody Austin (T7), Justin Rose (9), Retief Goosen (10)

- Zach Johnson (3), Jim Furyk (5) and Sergio García (T7) declined their invitations so the invitations went to the next three players in the rankings who are: Rory Sabbatini (11), Jerry Kelly (12), Andrés Romero (13)
- Number in parentheses in the player's HSBC Major Tournaments Ranking

4. The leading two available European Tour members: Anders Hansen, Niclas Fasth

*Note: These categories are listed in order. If you qualify for a high category then you are not listed under a lower category.

- Source

== Course ==
Front Nine	1	2	3	4	5	6	7	8	9	OUT
Yardage	473	154	465	552	212	418	396	401	449	3,520
Par	4	3	4	5	3	4	4	4	4	35

Back Nine	10	11	12	13	14	15	16	17	18	IN
Yardage	184	416	531	470	179	477	383	610	538	3,788
Par	3	4	5	4	3	4	4	5	5	37

	Front 9	Back 9	Total
Yardage	3,520	3,788	7,308
Par	35	37	72

== Bracket ==
First round 11 October
1	(England) Paul Casey	3&2
16	(United States) Jerry Kelly
8	(South Africa) Retief Goosen
9	(Argentina) Ángel Cabrera	6&5
5	(England) Justin Rose
12	(United States) Hunter Mahan	5&4
4	(South Africa) Rory Sabbatini
13	(Denmark) Søren Hansen	4&3
6	(Sweden) Henrik Stenson	1up
11	(United States) Woody Austin
3	(Republic of Ireland) Pádraig Harrington
14	(Denmark) Anders Hansen	4&3
7	(Sweden) Niclas Fasth
10	(Argentina) Andrés Romero	3&2
2	(South Africa) Ernie Els	6&5
15	(Scotland) Colin Montgomerie

Quarterfinals; 12 October
1	(England) Paul Casey
9	(Argentina) Ángel Cabrera	4&3
12	(United States) Hunter Mahan	6&4
13	(Denmark) Søren Hansen
6	(Sweden) Henrik Stenson	7&6
14	(Denmark) Anders Hansen
10	(Argentina) Andrés Romero
2	(South Africa) Ernie Els	6&5

Semifinals; 13 October
9	(Argentina) Ángel Cabrera	2&1
12	(United States) Hunter Mahan
6	(Sweden) Henrik Stenson
2	(South Africa) Ernie Els	3&2

Championship; 14 October
9	(Argentina) Ángel Cabrera
2	(South Africa) Ernie Els	6&4

=== Championship match ===
(South Africa) Ernie Els

Front Nine	1	2	3	4	5	6	7	8	9
Score	4	3	3	4	3	4	3	4	3
Score	1up	1up	2up	2up	1up	1up	2up	2up	3up

Back Nine	10	11	12	13	14	15	16	17	18
Score	2	4	X	4	2	3	4	6	4
Score	3up	3up	2up	2up	3up	3up	3up	2up	3up

Front Nine	19	20	21	22	23	24	25	26	27
Score	4	3	4	4	2	4	4	4	2
Score	3up	3up	4up	4up	4up	3up	3up	3up	2up

Back Nine	28	29	30	31	32
Score	2	4	4	4	2
Score	3up	3up	4up	5up	6up

(Argentina) Ángel Cabrera

Front Nine	1	2	3	4	5	6	7	8	9
Score	5	3	4	4	2	4	5	4	4

Back Nine	10	11	12	13	14	15	16	17	18
Score	2	4	X	4	3	3	4	5	6

Front Nine	19	20	21	22	23	24	25	26	27
Score	4	3	5	4	2	3	4	4	3

Back Nine	28	29	30	31	32
Score	3	4	5	5	3

Red background for birdies.
Blue background for bogeys.

== Prize money breakdown ==
=== Actual prize fund ===
Place	Euro (€)	Pounds (£)	US ($)
Champion	1,443,830	1,000,000	2,042,513.20
Runner-Up	577,532	400,000	817,005.28
Losing Semi Finalist x 2	173,259	120,000	245,100.73
Losing Quarter Finalists x 4	115,506	80,000	163,400.49
Losing First Round x 8	86,629	60,000	122,549.66
Total	€2,396,756	£1,660,000	$3,390,569.36

=== Breakdown for European Tour Order of Merit ===
Place	Euro (€)	Pounds (£)	US ($)
Champion	587,147	406,660	830,607.13
Runner-Up	391,436	271,110	553,744.69
Losing Semi Finalist x 2	198,341	120,000	280,582.97
Losing Quarter Finalists x 4	116,609	80,000	164,960.85
Losing First Round x 8	60,858	42,151	86,092.73
Total	€1,354,391	£938,014.17	$1,915,988.37

- Source
- Source for $US Dollar conversions
