= Brian Bamford =

English professional golfer (1935–2021)

Personal information
- Full name: Brian J. Bamford
- Nationality: England
- Born: 18 December 1935 Surrey, England
- Died: 25 June 2021 (aged 85)

Career
- Sport: Golf
- Turned professional: 1953
- Professional wins: 1

Best results in major championships
- Masters Tournament: DNP
- PGA Championship: DNP
- U.S. Open: DNP
- The Open Championship: T21: 1965

Brian J. Bamford (18 December 1935 – 25 June 2021) was an English professional golfer. He won the Schweppes PGA Close Championship in 1961.

== Professional career ==
Bamford began his professional career as an assistant at Burhill Golf Club before moving to Wentworth. While an assistant at Wentworth, Bamford won the Schweppes PGA Close Championship in April 1961, by 3 strokes from Peter Alliss and Christy O'Connor Snr, and took the first prize of £1,000. Because of the possibility of flooding at the Royal Mid-Surrey Golf Club, a composite course was used for the championship, including seven consecutive holes of the Ladies' course, measuring just 5,755 yards. Each competitor played one of their opening two rounds at Richmond Golf Club. His winning score of 266 remains the lowest in the Championship's history. As a result of his win he was selected for the English Canada Cup team, with Peter Alliss. The Canada Cup was played in Puerto Rico in early June with England finished in 15th place, Bamford scoring 311 for the four rounds. The week after the Canada Cup he was third in the Daks Tournament at Wentworth, two strokes behind Bernard Hunt.

After his win in the Schweppes PGA Close Championship, Bamford became the professional at Tavistock Golf Club, and was later professional at a number of other clubs, including West Sussex, Newquay, Isle of Purbeck and Worthing. Bamford played in The Open Championship each year from 1961 to 1965, making the cut twice, in 1962 and 1965. He was tied for 6th place after the first round of the 1965 Open Championship at Royal Birkdale, and eventually finished tied for 21st place, his best finish in the Open. Bamford was joint leader after the first round of the 1967 Schweppes PGA Close Championship but was then disqualified, following an inquiry, for taking more than the allowed five minutes to look for his ball in the rough at the 5th hole.

== Personal life ==
Bamford's daughter Sue is a professional golfer. In 1977 she reached the final of the Girls Amateur Championship, losing to Wilma Aitken.

Bamford died on 25 June 2021, at the age of 85.

== Professional wins (1) ==
=== British PGA circuits wins (1) ===
Date	Tournament	Winning score	Margin of victory	Runners-up
8 Apr 1961	Schweppes PGA Close Championship	68-66-67-65=266	3 strokes	(England) Peter Alliss, (Republic of Ireland) Christy O'Connor Snr

== Results in major championships ==
Tournament	1961	1962	1963	1964	1965
The Open Championship	CUT	T24	CUT	CUT	T21

Note: Bamford only played in The Open Championship.
CUT = missed the half-way cut
"T" indicates a tie for a place

== Team appearances ==
- Canada Cup (representing England): 1961
