= 1994 Volvo PGA Championship =

Tournament information
- Dates: 27–30 May 1994
- Location: Virginia Water, Surrey, England; 51.40°N 0.59°W
- Courses: Wentworth Club; West Course
- Tour: European Tour

Statistics
- Par: 72
- Field: 150 players, 67 after cut
- Cut: 145 (+1)
- Prize fund: €802,398
- Winner's share: €186,662

Champion
- (Spain) José María Olazábal
- 271 (−17)

Location map
- Location in England Location in Surrey

The 1994 Volvo PGA Championship was the 40th edition of the Volvo PGA Championship, an annual professional golf tournament on the European Tour. It was held 27–30 May at the West Course of Wentworth Club in Virginia Water, Surrey, England, a suburb southwest of London.

José María Olazábal won his first Volvo PGA Championship with a one stroke victory over Ernie Els.

== Round summaries ==
=== First round ===
Thursday, 27 May 1994

Place	Player	Score	To par
1	(South Africa) Ernie Els	66	−6
T2	(Spain) José María Olazábal	67	−5
T2	(Italy) Costantino Rocca	67	−5
T4	(England) Mark James	68	−4
T4	(Spain) Miguel Ángel Jiménez	68	−4
T4	(Scotland) Sandy Lyle	68	−4
T4	(Northern Ireland) Ronan Rafferty	68	−4
T4	(Australia) Wayne Riley	68	−4
T9	(Scotland) Gordon Brand Jnr	69	−3
T9	(Sweden) Anders Forsbrand	69	−3
T9	(Sweden) Joakim Haeggman	69	−3
T9	(England) Chris Hall	69	−3
T9	(Sweden) Peter Hedblom	69	−3
T9	(England) David R. Jones	69	−3
T9	(Germany) Bernhard Langer	69	−3
T9	(Scotland) Paul Lawrie	69	−3
T9	(Argentina) Eduardo Romero	69	−3

=== Second round ===
Friday, 28 May 1994

Place	Player	Score	To par
1	(South Africa) Ernie Els	66-66=132	−10
2	(Spain) Miguel Ángel Jiménez	68-66=134	−8
3	(Spain) José María Olazábal	67-68=135	−7
4	(Scotland) Adam Hunter	71-65=136	−6
5	(Italy) Costantino Rocca	67-70=137	−5
T6	(Sweden) Joakim Haeggman	69-69=138	−4
T6	(Sweden) Peter Hedblom	69-69=138	−4
T8	(Spain) Seve Ballesteros	73-66=139	−3
T8	(England) Gordon J. Brand	70-69=139	−3
T8	(Sweden) Anders Forsbrand	69-70=139	−3
T8	(Sweden) Pierre Fulke	72-67=139	−3
T8	(Germany) Bernhard Langer	69-70=139	−3
T8	(Scotland) Paul Lawrie	69-70=139	−3
T8	(Scotland) Sandy Lyle	68-71=139	−3
T8	(New Zealand) Frank Nobilo	73-66=139	−3
T8	(United States) Peter Teravainen	70-69=139	−3

=== Third round ===
Saturday, 29 May 1994

Place	Player	Score	To par
1	(South Africa) Ernie Els	66-66-71=203	−13
T2	(Spain) Miguel Ángel Jiménez	68-66-72=206	−10
T2	(Germany) Bernhard Langer	69-70-67=206	−10
T2	(Spain) José María Olazábal	67-68-71=206	−10
T5	(Sweden) Joakim Haeggman	69-69-70=208	−8
T5	(Scotland) Adam Hunter	71-65-72=208	−8
T5	(New Zealand) Frank Nobilo	73-66-69=208	−8
T8	(Spain) Seve Ballesteros	73-66-70=209	−7
T8	(England) Gordon J. Brand	70-69-70=209	−7
T8	(Sweden) Peter Hedblom	69-69-71=209	−7
T8	(Sweden) Mats Lanner	70-70-69=209	−7
T8	(Scotland) Sandy Lyle	68-71-70=209	−7
T8	(Italy) Costantino Rocca	67-70-72=209	−7
T8	(England) Mark Roe	71-70-68=209	−7
T8	(Argentina) Eduardo Romero	69-72-68=209	−7

=== Final round ===
Sunday, 30 May 1994

Place	Player	Score	To par	Money (€)
1	(Spain) José María Olazábal	67-68-71-65=271	−17	186,662
2	(South Africa) Ernie Els	66-66-71-69=272	−16	124,432
3	(Germany) Bernhard Langer	69-70-67-68=274	−14	70,098
T4	(Sweden) Joakim Haeggman	69-69-70-68=276	−12	51,716
T4	(Spain) Miguel Ángel Jiménez	68-66-72-70=276	−12	51,716
6	(Spain) Seve Ballesteros	73-66-70-68=277	−11	39,200
7	(England) Mark James	68-72-71-67=278	−10	33,600
8	(Scotland) Adam Hunter	71-65-72-71=279	−9	28,000
9	(Scotland) Sandy Lyle	68-71-70-71=280	−8	24,976
T10	(Sweden) Peter Hedblom	69-69-71-72=281	−7	20,076
T10	(England) Malcolm MacKenzie	73-70-69-69=281	−7	20,076
T10	(New Zealand) Frank Nobilo	73-66-69-73=281	−7	20,076
T10	(Scotland) Kevin Stables	71-71-71-68=281	−7	20,076
