= Anders Hansen =

Danish professional golfer (born 1970)

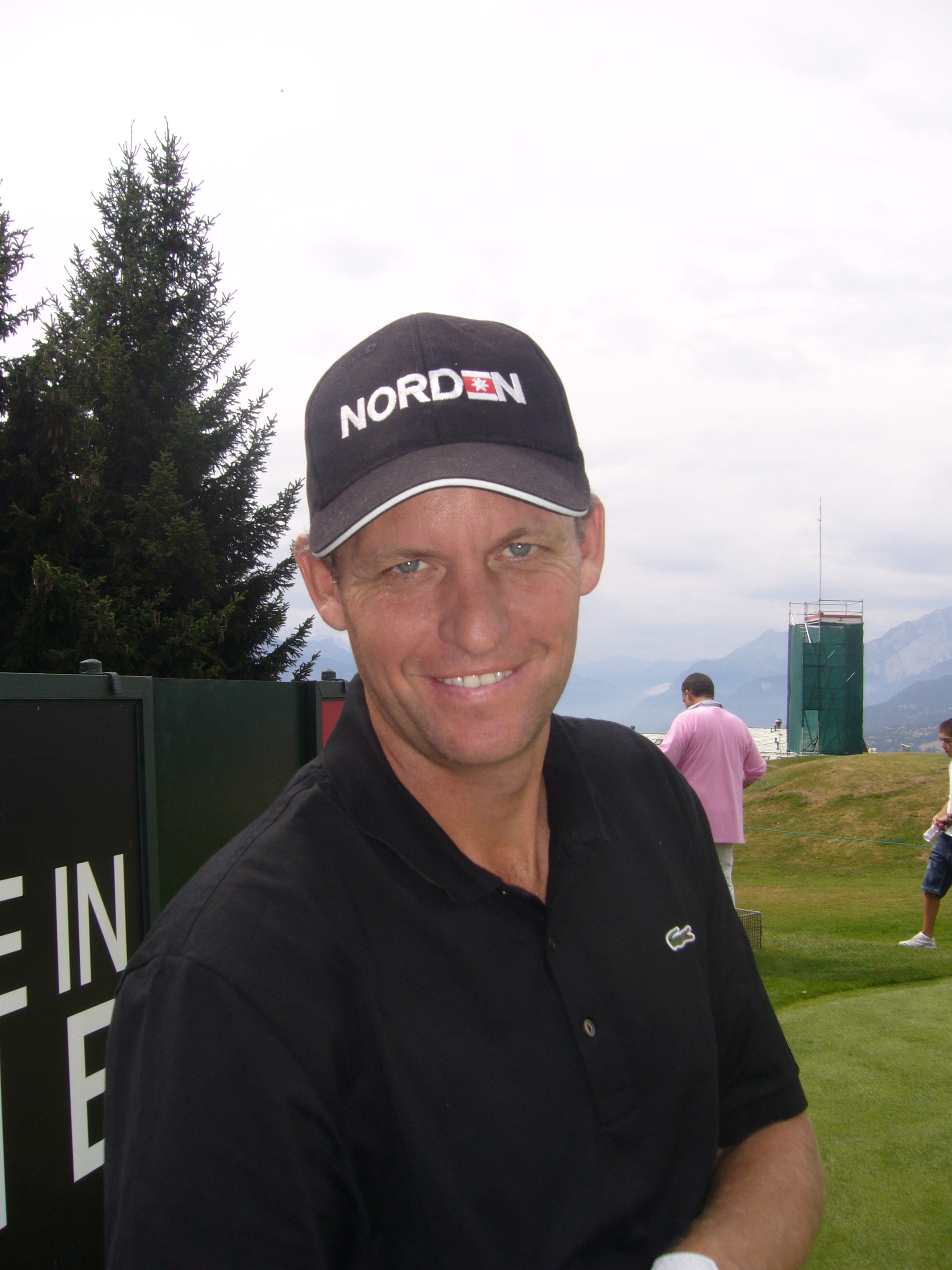

Personal information
- Full name: Anders Rosenberg Hansen
- Nationality: Denmark
- Born: 16 September 1970 (age 56) Sønderborg, Denmark
- Height: 6 ft 1 in (1.85 m)
- Weight: 165 lb (75 kg; 11.8 st)

Career
- Sport: Golf
- College: University of Houston
- Turned professional: 1995
- Former tours: PGA Tour; European Tour; Sunshine Tour
- Professional wins: 4
- Highest ranking: 23 (14 August 2011)

Number of wins by tour
- European Tour: 3
- Sunshine Tour: 2

Best results in major championships
- Masters Tournament: T24: 2012
- PGA Championship: 3rd: 2011
- U.S. Open: T55: 2007
- The Open Championship: T19: 2008

Achievements and awards
- Sunshine Tour Order of Merit winner: 2009

Anders Rosenberg Hansen (born 16 September 1970) is a Danish former professional golfer. He twice won the Volvo PGA Championship/BMW PGA Championship at Wentworth Club, England on the European Tour and finished third at the 2011 PGA Championship at Atlanta Athletic Club, Georgia, U.S.

== Career ==
Hansen was born in Sønderborg, Denmark. He turned professional in 1995. It took him a few years to establish himself on the European Tour, with his first top 116 Order of Merit finish (the level a player requires to automatically regain his card) coming in 1999.

His maiden European Tour victory was the 2002 Volvo PGA Championship and he finished in the top 60 on the Order of Merit every year from 2000 to 2012, with a best of seventh in 2011. He has featured in the top 25 of the Official World Golf Ranking and has been the highest ranked Danish golfer.

Hansen represented Denmark in the WGC-World Cup in 1999, 2002, 2003, 2004, 2005 and 2007.

Hansen had six top-10 finishes in 2006 including a third at the Dubai Desert Classic, playing the two final days in the leaderball with Tiger Woods and Retief Goosen, and a second at the Italian Open for the second straight year.

Hansen qualified for the PGA Tour for 2007, capturing the fourth available spot, eight strokes off the winner, George McNeill, but failed to maintain his playing rights at the end of the season.

His second European tour victory came when he won the 2007 BMW PGA Championship, the same tournament where he claimed his first victory five years before. Hansen then won his third event in 2009 at the Joburg Open, in South Africa. He came from behind on the final day with a 66, and eventually won by one stroke over Andrew McLardy. A month later he won for the second time on the Sunshine Tour at the Vodacom Championship and after strong finishes in the two European Tour co-sanctioned events at the end of the season, he headed the Order of Merit for 2009.

Hansen achieved his best finish ever at a World Golf Championship event in March 2011, when he finished tied 3rd at the WGC-Cadillac Championship, three strokes behind winner Nick Watney. He later on achieved his best finish in a major, when he finished 3rd in the 2011 PGA Championship.

He retired after the 2015 European Tour season, but still played in a small number of events in 2016. Hansen regained his European Tour card through Q School in 2017.

== Professional wins (4) ==
=== European Tour wins (3) ===
Legend
Flagship events (2)
Other European Tour (1)

No.	Date	Tournament	Winning score	Margin of victory	Runner(s)-up
1	26 May 2002	Volvo PGA Championship	−19 (68-65-66-70=269)	5 strokes	(Scotland) Colin Montgomerie, (Argentina) Eduardo Romero
2	27 May 2007	BMW PGA Championship (2)	−8 (74-70-67-69=280)	Playoff	(England) Justin Rose
3	11 Jan 2009	Joburg Open^{1}	−15 (71-68-64-66=269)	1 stroke	(South Africa) Andrew McLardy

^{1}Co-sanctioned by the Sunshine Tour

European Tour playoff record (1–3)

No.	Year	Tournament	Opponent(s)	Result
1	2003	Dunhill Championship	(England) Mark Foster, (South Africa) Trevor Immelman, (Scotland) Paul Lawrie, (Scotland) Doug McGuigan, (South Africa) Bradford Vaughan	Foster won with eagle on second extra hole Hansen and McGuigan eliminated by birdie on first hole
2	2007	BMW PGA Championship	(England) Justin Rose	Won with birdie on first extra hole
3	2008	BMW International Open	(Germany) Martin Kaymer	Lost to birdie on first extra hole
4	2009	Mercedes-Benz Championship	(South Africa) James Kingston	Lost to par on first extra hole

=== Sunshine Tour wins (2) ===
No.	Date	Tournament	Winning score	Margin of victory	Runner(s)-up
1	11 Jan 2009	Joburg Open^{1}	−15 (71-68-64-66=269)	1 stroke	(South Africa) Andrew McLardy
2	15 Feb 2009	Vodacom Championship	−18 (69-70-66-65=270)	4 strokes	(Canada) Graham DeLaet, (South Africa) Charl Schwartzel

^{1}Co-sanctioned by the European Tour

Sunshine Tour playoff record (0–1)

No.	Year	Tournament	Opponents	Result
1	2003	Dunhill Championship	(England) Mark Foster, (South Africa) Trevor Immelman, (Scotland) Paul Lawrie, (Scotland) Doug McGuigan, (South Africa) Bradford Vaughan	Foster won with eagle on second extra hole Hansen and McGuigan eliminated by birdie on first hole

== Results in major championships ==
Tournament	1999	2000	2001	2002	2003	2004	2005	2006	2007	2008	2009
Masters Tournament										CUT	
U.S. Open									T55		
The Open Championship	CUT			T77	CUT	CUT			T57	T19	CUT
PGA Championship				CUT	CUT			T24	T12	CUT	CUT

Tournament	2010	2011	2012
Masters Tournament	CUT	CUT	T24
U.S. Open			CUT
The Open Championship	CUT	T22	CUT
PGA Championship	CUT	3	CUT

Top 10
Did not play

CUT = missed the half-way cut
"T" = tied

=== Summary ===
Tournament	Wins	2nd	3rd	Top-5	Top-10	Top-25	Events	Cuts made
Masters Tournament	0	0	0	0	0	1	4	1
U.S. Open	0	0	0	0	0	0	2	1
The Open Championship	0	0	0	0	0	2	10	4
PGA Championship	0	0	1	1	1	3	9	3
Totals	0	0	1	1	1	6	25	9

- Most consecutive cuts made – 4 (2006 PGA – 2007 PGA)
- Longest streak of top-10s – 1

== Results in World Golf Championships ==
Tournament	2002	2003	2004	2005	2006	2007	2008	2009	2010	2011	2012
Match Play		R64					R64	R64	R32	R64	R32
Championship	T57						T12		45	T3	T29
Invitational	T58					T22		T45		T29	
Champions									63	T23	

Top 10
Did not play

QF, R16, R32, R64 = Round in which player lost in match play
"T" = Tied
Note that the HSBC Champions did not become a WGC event until 2009.

== Team appearances ==
Amateur

- European Amateur Team Championship (representing Denmark): 1991, 1993
- Eisenhower Trophy (representing Denmark): 1992

Professional

- World Cup (representing Denmark): 1999, 2002, 2003, 2004, 2005, 2007, 2008, 2011
- Seve Trophy (representing Continental Europe): 2009, 2011

== See also ==
- 2006 PGA Tour Qualifying School graduates
- 2017 European Tour Qualifying School graduates
