= 2007 BMW PGA Championship =

Tournament information
- Dates: 24–27 May 2007
- Location: Virginia Water, Surrey, England; 51.40°N 0.59°W
- Courses: Wentworth Club; West Course
- Tour: European Tour

Statistics
- Par: 72
- Length: 7,318 yards (6,692 m)
- Field: 150 players, 75 after cut
- Cut: 146 (+2)
- Prize fund: €4,350,000
- Winner's share: €725,000

Champion
- (Denmark) Anders Hansen
- 280 (−8)

Location map
- Location in England Location in Surrey

The 2007 BMW PGA Championship was the 53rd edition of the BMW PGA Championship, an annual professional golf tournament on the European Tour. It was held 24–27 May at the West Course of Wentworth Club in Virginia Water, Surrey, England, a suburb southwest of London.

Anders Hansen defeated Justin Rose in a playoff to capture his second BMW PGA Championship.

== Course layout ==
Wentworth Club, West Course
Tee	Rating/Slope	1	2	3	4	5	6	7	8	9	Out	10	11	12	13	14	15	16	17	18	In	Total
Yardage	n/a	474	154	465	552	212	418	396	401	448	3,518	184	416	531	470	179	489	383	610	538	3,800	7,318
Par		4	3	4	5	3	4	4	4	4	35	3	4	5	4	3	4	4	5	5	37	72

== Round summaries ==
=== First round ===
Thursday, 24 May 2007

Place	Player	Score	To par
T1	(England) Paul Broadhurst	66	−6
T1	(England) Justin Rose	66	−6
T3	(Australia) Marcus Fraser	67	−5
T3	(India) Shiv Kapur	67	−5
T3	(England) Simon Khan	67	−5
T3	(Italy) Francesco Molinari	67	−5
T7	(Spain) Alejandro Cañizares	68	−4
T7	(South Africa) Ernie Els	68	−4
T7	(Finland) Mikko Ilonen	68	−4
T7	(India) Jyoti Randhawa	68	−4
T7	(South Africa) Richard Sterne	68	−4
T7	(South Korea) Yang Yong-eun	68	−4

=== Second round ===
Friday, 25 May 2007

Place	Player	Score	To par
T1	(Argentina) Ángel Cabrera	70-66=136	−8
T1	(England) Justin Rose	66-70=136	−8
T3	(England) Ross Fisher	70-67=137	−7
T3	(Australia) Marcus Fraser	67-70=137	−7
T5	(England) Paul Broadhurst	66-72=138	−6
T5	(Republic of Ireland) Pádraig Harrington	69-69=138	−6
T5	(Spain) Miguel Ángel Jiménez	70-68=138	−6
T5	(India) Shiv Kapur	67-71=138	−6
T5	(Australia) Matthew Millar	69-69=138	−6
T10	(Spain) Alejandro Cañizares	68-71=139	−5
T10	(Finland) Mikko Ilonen	68-71=139	−5
T10	(Italy) Francesco Molinari	67-72=139	−5

=== Third round ===
Saturday, 26 May 2007

Place	Player	Score	To par
T1	(England) Paul Broadhurst	66-72-68=206	−10
T1	(England) Ross Fisher	70-67-69=206	−10
T3	(Australia) Marcus Fraser	67-70-70=207	−9
T3	(South Africa) Richard Sterne	68-73-66=207	−9
5	(England) Justin Rose	66-70-73=209	−7
6	(Spain) Miguel Ángel Jiménez	70-68-72=210	−6
T7	(Austria) Markus Brier	73-68-70=211	−5
T7	(England) Nick Dougherty	69-71-71=211	−5
T7	(Denmark) Anders Hansen	74-70-67=211	−5
T10	(Argentina) Ángel Cabrera	70-66-76=212	−4
T10	(England) Paul Casey	73-67-72=212	−4

=== Final round ===
Sunday, 27 May 2007

Place	Player	Score	To par	Money (€)
T1	(Denmark) Anders Hansen	74-70-67-69=280	−8	Playoff
T1	(England) Justin Rose	66-70-73-71=280	−8	Playoff
T3	(Fiji) Vijay Singh	73-72-70-66=281	−7	244,905
T3	(South Africa) Richard Sterne	68-73-66-74=281	−7	244,905
T5	(Argentina) Ángel Cabrera	70-66-76-70=282	−6	168,345
T5	(Spain) Miguel Ángel Jiménez	70-68-72-72=282	−6	168,345
7	(England) Luke Donald	71-72-71-69=283	−5	130,500
T8	(Sweden) Niclas Fasth	72-73-68-71=284	−4	93,308
T8	(Australia) Richard Green	73-73-67-71=284	−4	93,308
T8	(Thailand) Thongchai Jaidee	73-70-71-70=284	−4	93,308
T8	(Sweden) Henrik Stenson	70-73-72-69=284	−4	93,308

==== Scorecard ====
Hole	1	2	3	4	5	6	7	8	9	10	11	12	13	14	15	16	17	18
Par	4	3	4	5	3	4	4	4	4	3	4	5	4	3	4	4	5	5
(Denmark) Hansen	−4	−5	−4	−5	−5	−6	−6	−6	−6	−6	−6	−6	−6	−7	−7	−7	−7	−8
(England) Rose	−7	−8	−7	−8	−8	−9	−8	−8	−6	−7	−7	−7	−7	−7	−6	−7	−7	−8
(Fiji) Singh	−1	E	−1	−1	−1	−1	−1	−1	−2	−2	−2	−3	−4	−4	−5	−5	−6	−7
(South Africa) Sterne	−8	−8	−7	−8	−9	−9	−9	−9	−8	−6	−6	−6	−7	−7	−6	−7	−7	−7
(Argentina) Cabrera	−4	−4	−4	−5	−6	−6	−7	−7	−8	−8	−8	−8	−8	−8	−6	−6	−6	−6
(Spain) Jiménez	−6	−6	−6	−5	−5	−5	−5	−4	−4	−5	−5	−6	−6	−6	−6	−6	−6	−6
(England) Donald	−2	−2	−1	−2	−1	−1	−1	−1	−1	−1	−1	−3	−3	−3	−3	−3	−4	−5
(Australia) Fraser	−8	−8	−7	−7	−7	−7	−7	−6	−7	−7	−6	−6	−6	−4	−4	−4	−3	−3
(England) Broadhurst	−10	−9	−9	−7	−7	−7	−7	−6	−6	−6	−6	−6	−3	−3	−3	−3	−3	−2
(England) Fisher	−9	−8	−7	−6	−5	−5	−5	−5	−5	−5	−5	−2	−1	+1	+1	E	+1	+2

Cumulative tournament scores, relative to par

Eagle	Birdie	Bogey	Double bogey	Triple bogey+

=== Playoff ===
The playoff began on the par five 18th; Hansen holed a 25-foot (7.6m) putt for birdie which could not be replicated by Rose as his effort slid past the hole to leave the Dane celebrating his second victory in The European Tour's flagship event.

Place	Player	Score	To par	Money (€)	
1	Anders Hansen	Denmark	4	−1	725,000
2	Justin Rose	England	5	E	483,330
