= 2006 BMW Championship =

Tournament information
- Dates: 25–28 May 2006
- Location: Virginia Water, Surrey, England; 51.40°N 0.59°W
- Courses: Wentworth Club; West Course
- Tour: European Tour

Statistics
- Par: 72
- Length: 7,306 yards (6,681 m)
- Field: 156 players, 66 after cut
- Cut: 146 (+2)
- Prize fund: €4,250,000
- Winner's share: €708,330

Champion
- (England) David Howell
- 271 (−17)
- Location in England Location in Surrey

The 2006 BMW Championship was the 52nd edition of the BMW Championship, an annual professional golf tournament on the European Tour. It was held 25–28 May at the West Course of Wentworth Club in Virginia Water, Surrey, England, a suburb southwest of London.

David Howell cruised to a five stroke victory over Simon Khan to claim his first BMW Championship.

== Course layout ==
Wentworth Club, West Course
Tee	Rating/Slope	1	2	3	4	5	6	7	8	9	Out	10	11	12	13	14	15	16	17	18	In	Total
Yardage	n/a	474	154	465	552	212	418	396	401	448	3,518	184	416	531	470	179	477	383	610	538	3,788	7,306
Par		4	3	4	5	3	4	4	4	4	35	3	4	5	4	3	4	4	5	5	37	72

== Round summaries ==
=== First round ===
Thursday, 25 May 2006

Place	Player	Score	To par
T1	(England) Paul Casey	67	−5
T1	(England) Luke Donald	67	−5
T1	(England) Nick Dougherty	67	−5
T1	(South Africa) Andrew McLardy	67	−5
T5	(Argentina) Ángel Cabrera	68	−4
T5	(England) David Howell	68	−4
T5	(France) Raphaël Jacquelin	68	−4
T5	(Republic of Ireland) Peter Lawrie	68	−4
T9	(France) François Delamontagne	69	−3
T9	(Wales) Jamie Donaldson	69	−3
T9	(South Africa) Ernie Els	69	−3
T9	(England) Kenneth Ferrie	69	−3
T9	(Wales) Garry Houston	69	−3
T9	(Sweden) Robert Karlsson	69	−3
T9	(Scotland) Paul Lawrie	69	−3
T9	(Spain) José María Olazábal	69	−3
T9	(England) Ian Poulter	69	−3
T9	(Wales) Phillip Price	69	−3
T9	(England) John Wells	69	−3

=== Second round ===
Friday, 26 May 2006

Place	Player	Score	To par
1	(England) David Howell	68-65=133	−11
2	(England) Nick Dougherty	67-69=136	−8
T3	(Argentina) Ángel Cabrera	68-69=137	−7
T3	(Sweden) Robert Karlsson	69-68=137	−7
5	(England) Simon Khan	70-68=138	−6
T6	(England) Paul Casey	67-72=139	−5
T6	(France) François Delamontagne	69-70=139	−5
T6	(England) Luke Donald	67-72=139	−5
T9	(Sweden) Niclas Fasth	70-70=140	−4
T9	(France) Raphaël Jacquelin	68-72=140	−4
T9	(Spain) Miguel Ángel Jiménez	71-69=140	−4
T9	(Republic of Ireland) Peter Lawrie	68-72=140	−4

=== Third round ===
Saturday, 27 May 2006

Place	Player	Score	To par
1	(England) David Howell	68-65-69=202	−14
2	(Spain) Miguel Ángel Jiménez	71-69-65=205	−11
T3	(England) Paul Casey	67-72-69=208	−8
T3	(England) Simon Khan	70-68-70=208	−8
T5	(France) François Delamontagne	69-70-71=210	−6
T5	(England) Nick Dougherty	67-69-74=210	−6
T5	(Republic of Ireland) Pádraig Harrington	72-70-68=210	−6
T5	(France) Jean van de Velde	75-69-66=210	−6
T9	(Sweden) Niclas Fasth	70-70-71=211	−5
T9	(Denmark) Søren Hansen	70-72-69=211	−5
T9	(Sweden) Robert Karlsson	69-68-74=211	−5

=== Final round ===
Sunday, 28 May 2006

Place	Player	Score	To par	Money (€)
1	(England) David Howell	68-65-69-69=271	−17	708,330
2	(England) Simon Khan	70-68-70-68=276	−12	472,220
3	(Spain) Miguel Ángel Jiménez	71-69-65-72=277	−11	266,050
4	(Australia) Brett Rumford	72-73-69-65=279	−9	212,500
5	(England) Richard Bland	73-68-71-68=280	−8	180,200
T6	(Scotland) Andrew Coltart	71-72-69-69=281	−7	112,540
T6	(Republic of Ireland) Pádraig Harrington	72-70-68-71=281	−7	112,540
T6	(South Africa) Trevor Immelman	70-73-73-65=281	−7	112,540
T6	(Scotland) Gary Orr	71-70-73-67=281	−7	112,540
T6	(England) Anthony Wall	71-71-73-66=281	−7	112,540

==== Scorecard ====
Hole	1	2	3	4	5	6	7	8	9	10	11	12	13	14	15	16	17	18
Par	4	3	4	5	3	4	4	4	4	3	4	5	4	3	4	4	5	5
(England) Howell	−14	−15	−15	−16	−17	−17	−17	−17	−17	−16	−16	−17	−17	−17	−17	−17	−17	−17
(England) Khan	−8	−8	−8	−8	−9	−9	−10	−10	−10	−11	−10	−11	−11	−11	−11	−10	−11	−12
(Spain) Jiménez	−11	−11	−11	−12	−12	−11	−11	−11	−10	−10	−10	−11	−11	−11	−11	−11	−11	−11
(Australia) Rumford	−2	−2	−2	−4	−4	−4	−4	−4	−4	−5	−6	−7	−6	−6	−7	−7	−8	−9
(England) Bland	−3	−3	−2	−3	−3	−4	−3	−4	−3	−4	−4	−6	−5	−5	−6	−7	−7	−8

Cumulative tournament scores, relative to par

Eagle	Birdie	Bogey
