= 2000 Volvo PGA Championship =

Coordinates: 51.40°N 0.59°W

Tournament information
- Dates: 26–29 May 2000
- Location: Virginia Water, Surrey, England
- Course(s): Wentworth Club; West Course
- Tour(s): European Tour

Statistics
- Par: 72
- Length: 7,047 yards (6,444 m)
- Field: 156 players, 81 after cut
- Cut: 146 (+2)
- Prize fund: €2,531,710
- Winner's share: €415,130

Champion
- (Scotland) Colin Montgomerie
- 271 (−17)

Location in England

The 2000 Volvo PGA Championship was the 46th edition of the Volvo PGA Championship, an annual professional golf tournament on the European Tour. It was held 26–29 May at the West Course of Wentworth Club in Virginia Water, Surrey, England, a suburb southwest of London.

Colin Montgomerie won by three strokes over Darren Clarke, Andrew Coltart and Lee Westwood to claim his third consecutive Volvo PGA Championship, a feat that had never been achieved before.

== Course layout ==
Wentworth Club, West Course
Tee	Rating/Slope	1	2	3	4	5	6	7	8	9	Out	10	11	12	13	14	15	16	17	18	In	Total
Yardage	n/a	474	153	447	496	191	354	396	400	452	3,363	184	404	509	442	179	481	383	571	531	3,684	7,047
Par		4	3	4	5	3	4	4	4	4	35	3	4	5	4	3	4	4	5	5	37	72

== Round summaries ==
=== First round ===
Friday, 26 May 2000

Place	Player	Score	To par
1	(Australia) Nick O'Hern	65	−7
T2	(Scotland) Andrew Coltart	67	−5
T2	(Australia) Richard Green	67	−5
T2	(Sweden) Robert Karlsson	67	−5
T2	(Scotland) Colin Montgomerie	67	−5
T6	(Northern Ireland) Darren Clarke	68	−4
T6	(France) Olivier Edmond	68	−4
T6	(Spain) Sergio García	68	−4
T6	(Denmark) Søren Kjeldsen	68	−4
T6	(England) Stuart Little	68	−4
T6	(United States) Bob May	68	−4
T6	(Australia) Geoff Ogilvy	68	−4
T6	(Australia) Peter O'Malley	68	−4
T6	(Argentina) Gustavo Rojas	68	−4
T6	(France) Jean van de Velde	68	−4

=== Second round ===
Saturday, 27 May 2000

Place	Player	Score	To par
1	(Scotland) Colin Montgomerie	67-65=132	−12
2	(Australia) Richard Green	67-67=134	−10
T3	(Northern Ireland) Darren Clarke	68-68=136	−8
T3	(Scotland) Andrew Coltart	67-69=136	−8
T3	(Sweden) Robert Karlsson	67-69=136	−8
6	(England) Gary Emerson	69-69=138	−6
T7	(Spain) Sergio García	68-71=139	−5
T7	(Australia) Nick O'Hern	65-74=139	−5
T7	(Wales) Phillip Price	72-67=139	−5
T10	(Netherlands) Maarten Lafeber	69-71=140	−4
T10	(Germany) Bernhard Langer	69-71=140	−4
T10	(Republic of Ireland) Paul McGinley	70-70=140	−4

=== Third round ===
Sunday, 28 May 2000

Place	Player	Score	To par
1	(Scotland) Colin Montgomerie	67-65-70=202	−14
2	(Scotland) Andrew Coltart	67-69-69=205	−11
3	(England) Lee Westwood	71-70-65=206	−10
T4	(Spain) Sergio García	68-71-68=207	−9
T4	(Australia) Richard Green	67-67-73=207	−9
T6	(Northern Ireland) Darren Clarke	68-68-72=208	−8
T6	(Wales) Phillip Price	72-67-69=208	−8
T8	(Sweden) Robert Karlsson	67-69-74=210	−6
T8	(Australia) Nick O'Hern	65-74-71=210	−6
T8	(Australia) Peter O'Malley	68-73-69=210	−6

=== Final round ===
Monday, 29 May 2000

Place	Player	Score	To par	Money (€)
1	(Scotland) Colin Montgomerie	67-65-70-69=271	−17	415,130
T2	(Northern Ireland) Darren Clarke	68-68-72-66=274	−14	185,735
T2	(Scotland) Andrew Coltart	67-69-69-69=274	−14	185,735
T2	(England) Lee Westwood	71-70-65-68=274	−14	185,735
T5	(Spain) Sergio García	68-71-68-70=277	−11	96,393
T5	(Australia) Richard Green	67-67-73-70=277	−11	96,393
T7	(France) Olivier Edmond	68-74-69-68=279	−9	60,650
T7	(South Africa) Retief Goosen	74-70-68-67=279	−9	60,650
T7	(Australia) Peter O'Malley	68-73-69-69=279	−9	60,650
T7	(Wales) Ian Woosnam	72-71-68-68=279	−9	60,650

==== Scorecard ====
Hole	1	2	3	4	5	6	7	8	9	10	11	12	13	14	15	16	17	18
Par	4	3	4	5	3	4	4	4	4	3	4	5	4	3	4	4	5	5
(Scotland) Montgomerie	−13	−13	−13	−14	−14	−14	−13	−14	−14	−14	−15	−16	−17	−17	−17	−17	−17	−17
(Northern Ireland) Clarke	−8	−8	−9	−11	−11	−11	−11	−11	−11	−11	−11	−12	−12	−12	−13	−13	−13	−14
(Scotland) Coltart	−10	−11	−11	−12	−12	−12	−13	−13	−13	−13	−13	−13	−13	−13	−13	−13	−13	−14
(England) Westwood	−10	−10	−10	−11	−11	−11	−11	−11	−11	−11	−11	−12	−12	−12	−12	−12	−13	−14
(Spain) García	−9	−9	−9	−10	−9	−9	−9	−9	−9	−9	−10	−11	−11	−12	−11	−11	−11	−11
(Australia) Green	−9	−10	−10	−11	−11	−11	−10	−10	−10	−10	−10	−10	−10	−9	−9	−9	−10	−11

Cumulative tournament scores, relative to par

Eagle	Birdie	Bogey
