= 2007 European Tour =

Golf tour season

2007 European Tour season
- Duration: 9 November 2006 – 4 November 2007
- Number of official events: 52
- Most wins: (South Africa) Ernie Els (2) (Note: Tiger Woods won three events, but was not a European Tour member.) (Republic of Ireland) Pádraig Harrington (2) (Finland) Mikko Ilonen (2) (England) Justin Rose (2) (Sweden) Henrik Stenson (2) (England) Lee Westwood (2)
- Order of Merit: (England) Justin Rose
- Golfer of the Year: (Republic of Ireland) Pádraig Harrington
- Sir Henry Cotton Rookie of the Year: (Germany) Martin Kaymer

The 2007 European Tour was the 36th season of the European Tour, the main professional golf tour in Europe since its inaugural season in 1972.

== Changes for 2007 ==
There were three new tournaments, the Joburg Open in South Africa, the Open de Andalucía in Spain and the Portugal Masters. In addition, the long-established Australian Masters joined the tour schedule and two tournaments returned after missing the 2006 season; the New Zealand Open skipped a season due to date changes, and the German Masters having not been held in 2006, came back with a new sponsor and was re-titled as the Mercedes-Benz Championship.

== Schedule ==
The following table lists official events during the 2007 season.

Date	Tournament	Host country	Purse	Winner (Note: The number in brackets after each winner's name is the number of European Tour events they had won up to and including that tournament. This information is only shown for European Tour members and are inclusive of the three United States-based major championships which were included on the schedule for the first time in 1998, with earlier editions having retrospectively been recognised as official tour wins.)	OWGR points	Other tours (Note: AFR − Sunshine Tour; ANZ − PGA Tour of Australasia; ASA − Asian Tour; CHA − Challenge Tour.)	Notes
12 Nov	HSBC Champions	China	US$5,000,000	(South Korea) Yang Yong-eun (1)	52	AFR, (Note: Sunshine Tour unofficial event) ANZ, (Note: PGA Tour of Australasia unofficial event) ASA (Note: Asian Tour unofficial event)	Limited-field event
19 Nov	UBS Hong Kong Open	Hong Kong	US$2,000,000	(Spain) José Manuel Lara (1)	32	ASA	
26 Nov	MasterCard Masters	Australia	A$1,500,000	(England) Justin Rose (3)	30	ANZ	New to European Tour
3 Dec	Blue Chip New Zealand Open	New Zealand	NZ$1,500,000	(Australia) Nathan Green (1)	20	ANZ	
10 Dec	Alfred Dunhill Championship	South Africa	€1,000,000	(Spain) Álvaro Quirós (1)	18	AFR	
17 Dec	South African Airways Open	South Africa	€1,000,000	(South Africa) Ernie Els (23)	32	AFR (Note: Sunshine Tour flagship event)	
14 Jan	Joburg Open	South Africa	€1,000,000	(Argentina) Ariel Cañete (1)	20	AFR	New tournament
21 Jan	Abu Dhabi Golf Championship	UAE	US$2,000,000	(England) Paul Casey (8)	44		
28 Jan	Commercialbank Qatar Masters	Qatar	US$2,200,000	(South Africa) Retief Goosen (14)	48	ASA	
4 Feb	Dubai Desert Classic	UAE	US$2,400,000	(Sweden) Henrik Stenson (5)	50		
11 Feb	Maybank Malaysian Open	Malaysia	US$1,290,000	(Sweden) Peter Hedblom (2)	26	ASA	
18 Feb	Enjoy Jakarta Astro Indonesia Open	Indonesia	US$1,000,000	(Finland) Mikko Ilonen (1)	20	ASA	
25 Feb	WGC-Accenture Match Play Championship	United States	US$8,000,000	(Sweden) Henrik Stenson (6)	76		World Golf Championship
4 Mar	Johnnie Walker Classic	Thailand	£1,250,000	(South Africa) Anton Haig (1)	40	ANZ, ASA	
11 Mar	Clariden Leu Singapore Masters	Singapore	US$1,100,000	(China) Liang Wenchong (1)	30	ASA	
18 Mar	TCL Classic	China	US$1,000,000	(Thailand) Chapchai Nirat (1)	20	ASA	
25 Mar	Madeira Islands Open BPI	Portugal	€700,000	(Argentina) Daniel Vancsik (1)	24		
25 Mar	WGC-CA Championship	United States	US$8,000,000	(United States) Tiger Woods (n/a)	76		World Golf Championship
1 Apr	Estoril Open de Portugal	Portugal	€1,250,000	(Spain) Pablo Martín (a) (1)	24		
8 Apr	Masters Tournament	United States	US$7,000,000	(United States) Zach Johnson (n/a)	100		Major championship
15 Apr	Volvo China Open	China	US$2,000,000	(Austria) Markus Brier (2)	20	ASA	
22 Apr	BMW Asian Open	China	US$2,300,000	(France) Raphaël Jacquelin (2)	32	ASA	
29 Apr	Open de España	Spain	€2,000,000	(South Africa) Charl Schwartzel (2)	24		
6 May	Telecom Italia Open	Italy	€1,700,000	(Spain) Gonzalo Fernández-Castaño (3)	24		
13 May	Valle Romano Open de Andalucía	Spain	€1,000,000	(England) Lee Westwood (17)	24		New tournament
20 May	Irish Open	Ireland	€2,500,000	(Republic of Ireland) Pádraig Harrington (11)	28		
27 May	BMW PGA Championship	England	€4,350,000	(Denmark) Anders Hansen (2)	64		Flagship event
3 Jun	Celtic Manor Wales Open	Wales	£1,500,000	(South Africa) Richard Sterne (2)	26		
10 Jun	BA-CA Golf Open	Austria	€1,300,000	(Australia) Richard Green (2)	24		
17 Jun	Open de Saint-Omer	France	€500,000	(Spain) Carl Suneson (1)	18	CHA	
17 Jun	U.S. Open	United States	US$7,000,000	(Argentina) Ángel Cabrera (4)	100		Major championship
24 Jun	BMW International Open	Germany	€2,000,000	(Sweden) Niclas Fasth (6)	34		
1 Jul	Open de France Alstom	France	€4,000,000	(England) Graeme Storm (1)	30		
8 Jul	Smurfit Kappa European Open	Ireland	£2,400,000	(Scotland) Colin Montgomerie (31)	32		
15 Jul	Barclays Scottish Open	Scotland	£3,000,000	(France) Grégory Havret (2)	50		
22 Jul	The Open Championship	Scotland	£4,200,000	(Republic of Ireland) Pádraig Harrington (12)	100		Major championship
29 Jul	Deutsche Bank Players Championship of Europe	Germany	€3,600,000	(Argentina) Andrés Romero (1)	40		
5 Aug	Russian Open Golf Championship	Russia	US$2,000,000	(Sweden) Per-Ulrik Johansson (6)	24		
5 Aug	WGC-Bridgestone Invitational	United States	US$8,000,000	(United States) Tiger Woods (n/a)	76		World Golf Championship
12 Aug	PGA Championship	United States	US$7,000,000	(United States) Tiger Woods (n/a)	100		Major championship
19 Aug	Scandinavian Masters	Sweden	€1,600,000	(Finland) Mikko Ilonen (2)	24		
26 Aug	KLM Open	Netherlands	€1,600,000	(England) Ross Fisher (1)	24		
2 Sep	Johnnie Walker Championship at Gleneagles	Scotland	£1,400,000	(Scotland) Marc Warren (2)	24		
9 Sep	Omega European Masters	Switzerland	€2,000,000	(Australia) Brett Rumford (3)	30		
16 Sep	Mercedes-Benz Championship	Germany	€2,000,000	(Denmark) Søren Hansen (2)	40		Limited-field event
23 Sep	Quinn Direct British Masters	England	£1,800,000	(England) Lee Westwood (18)	32		
7 Oct	Alfred Dunhill Links Championship	Scotland	US$5,000,000	(England) Nick Dougherty (2)	48		Pro-Am
14 Oct	HSBC World Match Play Championship	England	£1,660,000	(South Africa) Ernie Els (24)	40		Limited-field event
14 Oct	Open de Madrid Valle Romano	Spain	€900,000	(Denmark) Mads Vibe-Hastrup (1)	24		
21 Oct	Portugal Masters	Portugal	€3,000,000	(England) Steve Webster (2)	34		New tournament
28 Oct	Mallorca Classic	Spain	€2,000,000	(France) Grégory Bourdy (1)	24		
4 Nov	Volvo Masters	Spain	€4,000,000	(England) Justin Rose (4)	46		Tour Championship

=== Unofficial events ===
The following events were sanctioned by the European Tour, but did not carry official money, nor were wins official.

Date	Tournament	Host country	Purse	Winners	OWGR points	Notes
30 Sep	Seve Trophy	Ireland	n/a	Team GB&I	n/a	Team event
25 Nov	Omega Mission Hills World Cup	China	US$5,000,000	(Scotland) Colin Montgomerie and (Scotland) Marc Warren	n/a	Team event

== Order of Merit ==
The Order of Merit was based on prize money won during the season, calculated in Euros.

Position	Player	Prize money (€)
1	(England) Justin Rose	2,944,945
2	(South Africa) Ernie Els	2,496,237
3	(Republic of Ireland) Pádraig Harrington	2,463,742
4	(Sweden) Henrik Stenson	2,014,841
5	(Sweden) Niclas Fasth	1,919,339
6	(Argentina) Ángel Cabrera	1,753,024
7	(Argentina) Andrés Romero	1,741,707
8	(Denmark) Søren Hansen	1,692,054
9	(South Africa) Retief Goosen	1,478,245
10	(England) Lee Westwood	1,420,327

== Awards ==
Award	Winner	Ref.
Golfer of the Year	(Republic of Ireland) Pádraig Harrington	
Sir Henry Cotton Rookie of the Year	(Germany) Martin Kaymer	

== See also ==
- 2007 in golf
- 2007 European Seniors Tour
