= 1999 Volvo PGA Championship =

Tournament information
- Dates: 28–31 May 1999
- Location: Virginia Water, Surrey, England; 51.40°N 0.59°W
- Courses: Wentworth Club; West Course
- Tour: European Tour

Statistics
- Par: 72
- Length: 7,002 yards (6,403 m)
- Field: 156 players, 66 after cut
- Cut: 146 (+2)
- Prize fund: €1,820,000
- Winner's share: €303,350

Champion
- (Scotland) Colin Montgomerie
- 270 (−18)

Location map
- Location in England Location in Surrey

The 1999 Volvo PGA Championship was the 45th edition of the Volvo PGA Championship, an annual professional golf tournament on the European Tour. It was held 28–31 May at the West Course of Wentworth Club in Virginia Water, Surrey, England, a suburb southwest of London.

Colin Montgomerie successfully defended his 1998 title to claim a five stroke victory over Mark James.

== Course layout ==
Wentworth Club, West Course
Tee	Rating/Slope	1	2	3	4	5	6	7	8	9	Out	10	11	12	13	14	15	16	17	18	In	Total
Yardage	n/a	470	155	452	501	191	355	399	398	449	3,370	186	398	510	441	179	466	379	571	502	3,632	7,002
Par		4	3	4	5	3	4	4	4	4	35	3	4	5	4	3	4	4	5	5	37	72

== Round summaries ==
=== First round ===
Thursday, 28 May 1999

Place	Player	Score	To par
1	(Germany) Bernhard Langer	65	−7
T2	(Northern Ireland) Darren Clarke	67	−5
T2	(England) Derrick Cooper	67	−5
T2	(South Africa) Retief Goosen	67	−5
T2	(England) Mark James	67	−5
T2	(Spain) Pedro Linhart	67	−5
T2	(Spain) José Rivero	67	−5
T2	(France) Jean van de velde	67	−5
T9	(New Zealand) Michael Campbell	68	−4
T9	(England) Paul Eales	68	−4
T9	(South Africa) Ernie Els	68	−4
T9	(Spain) José María Olazábal	68	−4
T9	(Scotland) Dean Robertson	68	−4

=== Second round ===
Friday, 29 May 1999

Place	Player	Score	To par
1	(Northern Ireland) Darren Clarke	67-67=134	−10
2	(South Africa) Ernie Els	68-67=135	−9
3	(South Africa) Retief Goosen	67-69=136	−8
T4	(England) Mark James	67-70=137	−7
T4	(Scotland) Dean Robertson	68-69=137	−7
T6	(New Zealand) Michael Campbell	68-70=138	−6
T6	(England) Paul Eales	68-70=138	−6
T6	(Sweden) Robert Karlsson	70-68=138	−6
T6	(Germany) Bernhard Langer	65-73=138	−6
T6	(Spain) José María Olazábal	68-70=138	−6
T6	(Scotland) Sam Torrance	70-68=138	−6

=== Third round ===
Saturday, 30 May 1999

Place	Player	Score	To par
T1	(South Africa) Retief Goosen	67-69-70=206	−10
T1	(Scotland) Colin Montgomerie	69-70-67=206	−10
T3	(Germany) Bernhard Langer	65-73-70=208	−8
T3	(Zimbabwe) Mark McNulty	71-70-67=208	−8
T5	(England) Paul Eales	68-70-71=209	−7
T5	(South Africa) Ernie Els	68-67-74=209	−7
T5	(Sweden) Mathias Grönberg	69-73-67=209	−7
T5	(England) Mark James	67-70-72=209	−7
T5	(Sweden) Robert Karlsson	70-68-71=209	−7
T5	(Australia) Stephen Leaney	73-67-69=209	−7
T5	(Australia) Peter Lonard	69-70-70=209	−7
T5	(Argentina) Eduardo Romero	71-71-67=209	−7

=== Final round ===
Sunday, 31 May 1999

Place	Player	Score	To par	Money (€)
1	(Scotland) Colin Montgomerie	69-70-67-64=270	−18	303,350
2	(England) Mark James	67-70-72-66=275	−13	202,300
3	(England) Paul Eales	68-70-71-67=276	−12	113,930
T4	(South Africa) Ernie Els	68-67-74-68=277	−11	77,233
T4	(South Africa) Retief Goosen	67-69-70-71=277	−11	77,233
T4	(Australia) Stephen Leaney	73-67-69-68=277	−11	77,233
T7	(England) David Carter	71-70-69-68=278	−10	46,900
T7	(Sweden) Mathias Grönberg	69-73-67-69=278	−10	46,900
T7	(Germany) Bernhard Langer	65-73-70-70=278	−10	46,900
T10	(Spain) José María Olazábal	68-70-72-69=279	−9	33,717
T10	(Sweden) Jarmo Sandelin	70-72-71-66=279	−9	33,717
T10	(Germany) Sven Strüver	75-69-69-66=279	−9	33,717
