= BMW PGA Championship =

Golf tournament in the United Kingdom

Coordinates: 51.40°N 0.59°W

Tournament information
- Location: Virginia Water, Surrey, England
- Established: 1955
- Course: Wentworth Club (West Course)
- Par: 72
- Length: 7,267 yards (6,645 m)
- Tour: European Tour
- Format: Stroke play
- Prize fund: US$9,000,000
- Month played: September

Tournament record score
- Aggregate: 266 Brian Bamford (1961)
- To par: −21 An Byeong-hun (2015)

Current champion
- (United States) J. J. Spaun

Location map
- Location in England Location in Surrey

The BMW PGA Championship is an annual men's professional golf tournament on the European Tour. It was founded in 1955 by the Professional Golfers' Association. It is sometimes called the British PGA Championship or European PGA Championship to avoid confusion with the PGA Championship (held in the United States), which is a major.

== History ==
The BMW PGA Championship was originally played each May, on the weekend of the UK's Spring Bank Holiday, over the West Course at the Wentworth Club in Surrey, England. The tournament switched to September in 2019 as part of a revamp of the golfing calendar in which the US PGA Championship moved to May.

The PGA European Tour has its headquarters at the club and as the tour's home tournament, the BMW PGA Championship is often regarded as the flagship event on the European Tour. It previously had the highest prize money of any event which the tour organises, but this changed in 2009 with the introduction of the Race to Dubai, and the $10 million Dubai World Championship at the end of the season. There are other more lucrative events than the BMW PGA Championship which are part of the European Tour schedule, such as the majors and the World Golf Championship events, but these are organised by other bodies. It is also the European Tour's designated "Premier event" for the purposes of the Official World Golf Rankings, with a minimum of 64 ranking points available to the winner.

The winner of the tournament is given an exemption into that season's U.S. Open and the next three Open Championships.

In 2000, Colin Montgomerie became the only player to win three years in a row.

In 2021, Billy Horschel became only the second American to win the event, the first since Arnold Palmer in 1975.

=== Attendance ===
In 2024, the event attracted 114,000 spectators.

== Winners ==
European Tour (Rolex Series)	2022–
European Tour (Flagship event and Rolex Series)	2017–2021
European Tour (Flagship event)	1990–2016
European Tour (Regular)	1972–1989
Pre-European Tour	1955–1971

#	Year	Winner	Score	To par	Margin of victory	Runner(s)-up	Winner's share (€)	Venue
BMW PGA Championship
72nd	2026	(United States) J. J. Spaun	271	−17	2 strokes	(Spain) Manuel Elvira (Northern Ireland) Rory McIlroy (England) Aaron Rai (Australia) Adam Scott	1,304,227	Wentworth (West)
71st	2025	(Sweden) Alex Norén (2)	269	−19	Playoff	(France) Adrien Saddier	1,304,227	Wentworth (West)
70th	2024	(United States) Billy Horschel (2)	268	−20	Playoff	(South Africa) Thriston Lawrence (Northern Ireland) Rory McIlroy	1,370,338	Wentworth (West)
69th	2023	(New Zealand) Ryan Fox	270	−18	1 stroke	(England) Tyrrell Hatton (England) Aaron Rai	1,435,858	Wentworth (West)
68th	2022	(Republic of Ireland) Shane Lowry	199 (Note: Shortened to 54 holes due to Operation London Bridge.)	−17	1 stroke	(Northern Ireland) Rory McIlroy (Spain) Jon Rahm	1,351,106	Wentworth (West)
67th	2021	(United States) Billy Horschel	269	−19	1 stroke	(Thailand) Kiradech Aphibarnrat (England) Laurie Canter (Wales) Jamie Donaldson	1,125,952	Wentworth (West)
66th	2020	(England) Tyrrell Hatton	269	−19	4 strokes	(France) Victor Perez	974,457	Wentworth (West)
65th	2019	(England) Danny Willett	268	−20	3 strokes	(Spain) Jon Rahm	1,056,662	Wentworth (West)
64th	2018	(Italy) Francesco Molinari	271	−17	2 strokes	(Northern Ireland) Rory McIlroy	995,394	Wentworth (West)
63rd	2017	(Sweden) Alex Norén	277	−11	2 strokes	(Italy) Francesco Molinari	1,041,939	Wentworth (West)
62nd	2016	(England) Chris Wood	279	−9	1 stroke	(Sweden) Rikard Karlberg	833,330	Wentworth (West)
61st	2015	(South Korea) An Byeong-hun	267	−21	6 strokes	(Thailand) Thongchai Jaidee (Spain) Miguel Ángel Jiménez	833,330	Wentworth (West)
60th	2014	(Northern Ireland) Rory McIlroy	274	−14	1 stroke	(Republic of Ireland) Shane Lowry	791,660	Wentworth (West)
59th	2013	(Italy) Matteo Manassero	278	−10	Playoff	(England) Simon Khan (Scotland) Marc Warren	791,660	Wentworth (West)
58th	2012	(England) Luke Donald (2)	273	−15	4 strokes	(Scotland) Paul Lawrie (England) Justin Rose	750,000	Wentworth (West)
57th	2011	(England) Luke Donald	278	−6	Playoff	(England) Lee Westwood	750,000	Wentworth (West)
56th	2010	(England) Simon Khan	278	−6	1 stroke	(Sweden) Fredrik Andersson Hed (England) Luke Donald	750,000	Wentworth (West)
55th	2009	(England) Paul Casey	271	−17	1 stroke	(England) Ross Fisher	750,000	Wentworth (West)
54th	2008	(Spain) Miguel Ángel Jiménez	277	−11	Playoff	(England) Oliver Wilson	750,000	Wentworth (West)
53rd	2007	(Denmark) Anders Hansen (2)	280	−8	Playoff	(England) Justin Rose	725,000	Wentworth (West)
BMW Championship
52nd	2006	(England) David Howell	271	−17	5 strokes	(England) Simon Khan	708,330	Wentworth (West)
51st	2005	(Argentina) Ángel Cabrera	273	−15	2 strokes	(Republic of Ireland) Paul McGinley	666,660	Wentworth (West)
Volvo PGA Championship
50th	2004	(Scotland) Scott Drummond	269	−19	2 strokes	(Argentina) Ángel Cabrera	625,000	Wentworth (West)
49th	2003	(Spain) Ignacio Garrido	270	−18	Playoff	(South Africa) Trevor Immelman	583,330	Wentworth (West)
48th	2002	(Denmark) Anders Hansen	269	−19	5 strokes	(Scotland) Colin Montgomerie (Argentina) Eduardo Romero	528,708	Wentworth (West)
47th	2001	(Scotland) Andrew Oldcorn	272	−16	2 strokes	(Argentina) Ángel Cabrera	544,521	Wentworth (West)
46th	2000	(Scotland) Colin Montgomerie (3)	271	−17	3 strokes	(Northern Ireland) Darren Clarke (England) Lee Westwood (Scotland) Andrew Coltart	415,130	Wentworth (West)
45th	1999	(Scotland) Colin Montgomerie (2)	270	−18	5 strokes	(England) Mark James	303,350	Wentworth (West)
44th	1998	(Scotland) Colin Montgomerie	274	−14	1 stroke	(South Africa) Ernie Els (Scotland) Gary Orr (Sweden) Patrik Sjöland	280,000	Wentworth (West)
43rd	1997	(Wales) Ian Woosnam (2)	275	−13	2 strokes	(Northern Ireland) Darren Clarke (South Africa) Ernie Els (England) Nick Faldo	256,676	Wentworth (West)
42nd	1996	(Italy) Costantino Rocca	274	−14	2 strokes	(England) Nick Faldo (Scotland) Paul Lawrie	233,324	Wentworth (West)
41st	1995	(Germany) Bernhard Langer (3)	279	−9	1 stroke	(New Zealand) Michael Campbell (Sweden) Per-Ulrik Johansson	210,000	Wentworth (West)
40th	1994	(Spain) José María Olazábal	271	−17	1 stroke	(South Africa) Ernie Els	186,662	Wentworth (West)
39th	1993	(Germany) Bernhard Langer (2)	274	−14	6 strokes	(Scotland) Gordon Brand Jnr (Scotland) Colin Montgomerie (New Zealand) Frank Nobilo	163,324	Wentworth (West)
38th	1992	(Zimbabwe) Tony Johnstone	272	−16	2 strokes	(Scotland) Gordon Brand Jnr (Spain) José María Olazábal	140,000	Wentworth (West)
37th	1991	(Spain) Seve Ballesteros (2)	271	−17	Playoff	(Scotland) Colin Montgomerie	116,662	Wentworth (West)
36th	1990	(Australia) Mike Harwood	271	−17	1 stroke	(South Africa) John Bland (England) Nick Faldo	93,324	Wentworth (West)
35th	1989	(England) Nick Faldo (4)	272	−16	2 strokes	(Wales) Ian Woosnam	81,662	Wentworth (West)
34th	1988	(Wales) Ian Woosnam	274	−14	2 strokes	(Spain) Seve Ballesteros (England) Mark James	70,000	Wentworth (West)
Whyte & Mackay PGA Championship
33rd	1987	(West Germany) Bernhard Langer	270	−18	4 strokes	(Spain) Seve Ballesteros	51,324	Wentworth (West)
32nd	1986	(Australia) Rodger Davis	281	−7	Playoff	(Republic of Ireland) Des Smyth	49,000	Wentworth (West)
31st	1985	(England) Paul Way	282	−6	Playoff	(Scotland) Sandy Lyle	42,000	Wentworth (West)
30th	1984	(England) Howard Clark	204 (Note: Shortened to 54 holes due to weather.)	−12	2 strokes	(England) Gordon J. Brand (West Germany) Bernhard Langer	35,000	Wentworth (West)
Sun Alliance PGA Championship
29th	1983	(Spain) Seve Ballesteros	278	−2	2 strokes	(Scotland) Ken Brown (Scotland) Sandy Lyle	21,000	Royal St George's
28th	1982	(England) Tony Jacklin (2)	284	−4	Playoff	(West Germany) Bernhard Langer	18,662	Hillside
27th	1981	(England) Nick Faldo (3)	274	−10	4 strokes	(Scotland) Ken Brown (England) Neil Coles	16,324	Ganton
26th	1980	(England) Nick Faldo (2)	283	+3	1 stroke	(Scotland) Ken Brown	16,324	Royal St George's
Colgate PGA Championship
25th	1979	(Argentina) Vicente Fernández	288	E	1 stroke	(Italy) Baldovino Dassù (South Africa) Gary Player	11,662	St Andrews (Old)
24th	1978	(England) Nick Faldo	278	−10	7 strokes	(Scotland) Ken Brown	14,000	Royal Birkdale
Penfold PGA Championship
23rd	1977	(Spain) Manuel Piñero	283	+3	3 strokes	(England) Peter Oosterhuis	14,000	Royal St George's
22nd	1976	(England) Neil Coles	280	E	Playoff	(Republic of Ireland) Eamonn Darcy (South Africa) Gary Player	14,000	Royal St George's
21st	1975	(United States) Arnold Palmer	285	+5	2 strokes	(Republic of Ireland) Eamonn Darcy	14,000	Royal St George's
Viyella PGA Championship
20th	1974	(England) Maurice Bembridge	278	−10	1 stroke	(England) Peter Oosterhuis	5,600	Wentworth (West)
19th	1973	(England) Peter Oosterhuis	280	−8	3 strokes	(South Africa) Dale Hayes (Belgium) Donald Swaelens	3,071	Wentworth (West)
18th	1972	(England) Tony Jacklin	279	−9	3 strokes	(England) Peter Oosterhuis	3,070	Wentworth (West)
Schweppes PGA Championship
1970–71: No tournament
17th	1969	(Scotland) Bernard Gallacher	293	+5	1 stroke	(England) John Garner (England) Guy Wolstenholme		Ashburnham
15th	1968 (op.) (Note: In 1967 and 1968, both open and closed championships were held.)	(England) David Talbot	276	−8	5 strokes	(England) Bernard Hunt		Dunbar
13th	1967 (op.)	(England) Malcolm Gregson	275	−13	3 strokes	(Republic of Ireland) Hugh Boyle		Hunstanton
Piccadilly PGA Close Championship
16th	1968 (cl.)	(England) Peter Townsend	275	−5	1 stroke	(England) Neil Coles		Royal Mid-Surrey
PGA Close Championship
14th	1967 (cl.)	(Wales) Brian Huggett	271	−13	8 strokes	(England) Jimmy Hitchcock (England) Bernard Hunt		Thorndon Park
Schweppes PGA Close Championship
12th	1966	(England) Guy Wolstenholme	278	−2	4 strokes	(Scotland) George Will		Saunton (East)
11th	1965	(England) Peter Alliss (3)	286	−6	Playoff (Note: Alliss won on the first hole of a sudden-death playoff.)	(England) Peter Butler		Prince's
10th	1964	(England) Tony Grubb	287	−1	2 strokes	(England) Lionel Platts		Western Gailes
9th	1963	(England) Peter Butler	306		2 strokes	(Scotland) Bobby Walker	1,000	Royal Birkdale
8th	1962	(England) Peter Alliss (2)	287		1 stroke	(England) Ralph Moffitt (Republic of Ireland) Christy O'Connor Snr		Little Aston; Sutton Coldfield
7th	1961	(England) Brian Bamford	266	−11	3 strokes	(England) Peter Alliss (Republic of Ireland) Christy O'Connor Snr		Royal Mid-Surrey; Richmond
PGA Close Championship
6th	1960	(England) Arnold Stickley	247 (Note: Shortened to 63 holes due to weather.)		2 strokes	(Wales) Dai Rees		Coventry
5th	1959	(Wales) Dai Rees	283		6 strokes	(England) Bernard Hunt (England) David Snell		Ashburnham
4th	1958	(Republic of Ireland) Harry Bradshaw	287		1 stroke	(Wales) Dai Rees		Maesdu
3rd	1957	(England) Peter Alliss	286		3 strokes	(England) Charlie Ward		Maesdu
2nd	1956	(England) Charlie Ward	282		Playoff (Note: Ward defeated Brown in a 36 hole playoff; Ward 139, Brown 141.)	(Scotland) Eric Brown		Maesdu
1st	1955	(England) Ken Bousfield	277		2 strokes	(England) Max Faulkner		Pannal; Harrogate (Starbeck)

== Media coverage ==
Currently in the United Kingdom, all four rounds of the BMW PGA Championship are shown live by Sky Sports with highlights being shown by the BBC.
