= Colin Montgomerie =

Scottish professional golfer (born 1963)

Colin Montgomerie OBE
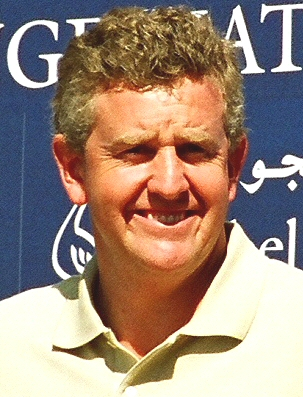

Personal information
- Full name: Colin Stuart Montgomerie
- Nickname: Monty
- Nationality: Scotland
- Born: 23 June 1963 (age 63) Glasgow, Scotland
- Height: 6 ft 1 in (185 cm)
- Spouses: Eimear Wilson (m. 1990; div. 2006) Gaynor Knowles (m. 2008; div. 2017) Sarah Casey (m. 2023)
- Children: 3

Career
- Sport: Golf
- College: Houston Baptist University
- Turned professional: 1987
- Current tours: PGA Tour Champions; European Senior Tour
- Former tour: European Tour
- Professional wins: 54
- Highest ranking: 2 (17 March 1996)

Number of wins by tour
- European Tour: 31 (4th all-time)
- Asian Tour: 2
- PGA Tour of Australasia: 1
- PGA Tour Champions: 7
- European Senior Tour: 9 (Tied 5th all-time)
- Other: 7

Best results in major championships
- Masters Tournament: T8: 1998
- PGA Championship: 2nd: 1995
- U.S. Open: 2nd/T2: 1994, 1997, 2006
- The Open Championship: 2nd: 2005

Achievements and awards
- World Golf Hall of Fame: 2013 (member page)
- Sir Henry Cotton Rookie of the Year: 1988
- European Tour Order of Merit winner: 1993, 1994, 1995, 1996, 1997, 1998, 1999, 2005
- European Tour Golfer of the Year: 1995, 1996, 1997, 1999
- European Senior Tour Order of Merit winner: 2014, 2015

Colin Stuart Montgomerie (born 23 June 1963) is a Scottish professional golfer. He has won a record eight European Tour Order of Merit titles, including a streak of seven consecutive ones from 1993 to 1999. He has won 31 European Tour events, third among European players, placing him fourth on the all-time list of golfers with most European Tour victories. However, Montgomerie never won on the PGA Tour.

Montgomerie won three consecutive Volvo PGA Championships at Wentworth Club between 1998 and 2000. He has finished runner-up on five occasions in major championships and his career-high world ranking is second. He was inducted into the World Golf Hall of Fame in 2013.

After turning 50 in 2013, Montgomerie has had a successful career on the PGA Tour Champions and European Senior Tour, including winning three senior major championships.

== Early life ==
Although Scottish by birth and ancestry, he was raised in Yorkshire, England, where his father, James Montgomerie, was Managing Director of Fox's Biscuits. He spent a number of years with the Ilkley Golf Club, where he was tutored by the past professional Bill Ferguson. He was educated at both Leeds Grammar School and Strathallan School, Perthshire. During his time in Leeds, he became a supporter of Leeds United. His father later became the secretary of Royal Troon Golf Club, one of Scotland's most famous clubs.

== Amateur career ==
Montgomerie became one of the first British golfers to go to a United States college, attending Houston Baptist University, where he played on the golf team for four years, and became its top player. He won three important Scottish amateur tournaments – the 1983 Scottish Youths Championship, the 1985 Scottish Amateur Stroke Play Championship and the 1987 Scottish Amateur Championship.

He played for Great Britain and Ireland twice in the Eisenhower Trophy, (1984 and 1986) and twice in the Walker Cup (1985 and 1987). He was also part of the Scottish team, winning the 1985 European Amateur Team Championship at Halmstad Golf Club, North Course, in Sweden. Before turning pro he considered a career in sports management, utilizing his degree in business management and law; the interview process included a golf outing that convinced the firm he should become a client rather than an employee.

== Professional career ==
In 1988, Montgomerie turned professional before the season began. He was named the Rookie of the Year on the European Tour that year. He quickly developed into one of Europe's top pros, winning his first event at the 1989 Portuguese Open TPC by 11 shots, and his second, beating a world class field, at the 1991 Scandinavian Masters at Royal Drottningholm Golf Club in Sweden. He made his Ryder Cup debut later in 1991. He finished first on the European Tour Order of Merit every year from 1993 to 1999 (a record for most consecutive Orders of Merit), and has 31 victories on the tour, including the 1998, 1999, and 2000 Volvo PGA Championships at Wentworth, England. However, despite many near-misses, Montgomerie was unable to win on the PGA Tour.

Montgomerie first reached the top-10 in the Official World Golf Rankings in 1994, and spent 400 weeks in the top-10. His highest ranking was number two. In his prime Montgomerie was considered one of the best drivers of the golf ball in the world and became a very precise iron player, often able to judge the distance he hit the ball exactly from long range.

Montgomerie came first in the Volvo Bonus Pool every year from 1993 to 1998. The Volvo Bonus Pool was an extra tranche of prize money awarded at the end of each European Tour season from 1988 to 1998 to the regular members of the tour who had had the best performances over the season.

His form fell away gradually in the new millennium, partly due to marriage problems, and his ranking slumped to 82nd in the world, but he came back strongly in 2005, winning a record eighth European Tour Order of Merit and returning to the top ten in the World Rankings. Late in 2005 he became the first man to win 20 million Euros on the European Tour—topping the European Tour's all-time highest earners list. He won for the first time in nearly two years at the Smurfit Kappa European Open in July 2007. In 2008, Montgomerie slipped out of the top 100 players in the world ranking system. A runner-up finish at the 2008 French Open in June boosted him back up the rankings, but his good play was short-lived, and as a result Montgomerie failed to qualify for Nick Faldo's 2008 Ryder Cup team. In March 2009, Montgomerie played in his milestone 500th European Tour event at the Open de Andalucia where he made the cut, but was not in contention during the weekend. He remained the leader in career earnings on the European Tour until 2010, when he was surpassed by Ernie Els.

After nearly two years without a top-10 finish, Montgomerie posted a final round of 68 for a share of 7th place in the 2011 BMW PGA Championship at Wentworth. Despite the drop in form, his influence remained strong. In 2012, Montgomerie was named by the Golf Club Managers' Association's Golf Club Management magazine as the seventh most powerful person in British golf. In August 2012, Montgomerie finished tied for 6th at the Johnnie Walker Championship at Gleneagles, his highest finish in over four years.

In June 2013, after turning 50, Montgomerie joined the Champions Tour, where he made his debut in the Constellation Senior Players Championship, one of the five senior major championships. On 25 May 2014, Montgomerie won his first senior major championship at the Senior PGA Championship. He followed this up on 13 July 2014, when he claimed his second senior major at the U.S. Senior Open. On 24 May 2015, Montgomerie defended his Senior PGA Championship title to win his third senior major. However, in 2016 he narrowly missed out on making it three Senior PGA Championships in a row – finishing second and three shots behind winner Rocco Mediate. He won twice on the senior circuit in 2017, winning the inaugural Japan Airlines Championship before claiming his sixth Champions Tour win at the SAS Championship. His most recent victory came at the Invesco QQQ Championship in 2019.

=== Major championships ===
Montgomerie is generally considered to be one of the best golfers never to have won a major championship, after finishing in second place on five occasions. During what most consider to be his best years in the 1990s Montgomerie had several near-misses. A third place at the 1992 U.S. Open at Pebble Beach Golf Links was the first of these. He was prematurely congratulated by Jack Nicklaus who said "Congratulations on your first U.S. Open victory" to Montgomerie after he finished the 18th hole on Sunday. Tom Kite, who was still on the golf course when Montgomerie finished, won the championship.

At the 1994 U.S. Open, played at Oakmont Country Club, Montgomerie lost in a three-man playoff to Ernie Els (a playoff which also included Loren Roberts). Montgomerie shot 78 to trail the 74s shot by Els and Roberts, with Els winning at the 20th extra hole.

At the 1995 PGA Championship, Montgomerie birdied the final three holes of the Riviera Country Club course in the final round, to tie Steve Elkington at 17 under par. On the first sudden-death playoff hole, after being in a better position after two shots, Montgomerie missed his putt, while Elkington holed from 35 feet to claim the title.

Els defeated Montgomerie at the 1997 U.S. Open, played at Congressional Country Club. Montgomerie opened the tournament with a 65 but shot a 76 in the second round. A bogey on the 71st hole dropped Montgomerie one shot behind Els, who parred the last to win.

At the 2006 U.S. Open, played on the West course of the Winged Foot Golf Club, Montgomerie had yet another chance to win his first major championship. He stood in the middle of the 18th fairway in the final round having sunk a 50-foot birdie putt on the 17th green, which put him in the joint lead with Phil Mickelson. While waiting in position on the 18th fairway for the group in front to finish, Montgomerie switched his club from a 6-iron to a 7-iron, assuming adrenaline would kick in. Once the wait was over, he hit the approach shot poorly, ending up short and right of the green, in thick rough. He pitched onto the green, and then three-putted from 30 feet to lose the tournament by one stroke. After the loss, Montgomerie said, "At my age I've got to think positively. I'm 43 next week, and it's nice I can come back to this tournament and do well again, and I look forward to coming back here again next year and trying another U.S. Open disaster." Geoff Ogilvy won the championship.

Montgomerie's best finish in the Masters Tournament came in 1998 when he finished tied for 8th.

At The Open Championship in 2001 at Royal Lytham & St Annes Golf Club, Montgomerie started brightly with an opening 65, and still remained ahead after 36 holes, but he fell away over the weekend. He was also in contention with two rounds to play at Muirfield in 2002 and Royal Troon Golf Club in 2004, but failed to capitalise and finished midway down the field. His best finish in the Championship came in 2005 at St Andrews, where he finished second to Tiger Woods, who beat him by five shots.

In 2016, Montgomerie came through Open Qualifying at Gailes Links to qualify for his home Open at Royal Troon. He had the honour of hitting the opening tee shot at the tournament and ended up making the cut.

Following Sergio García's victory at the 2017 Masters, Montgomerie (with 75 starts) trailed only Jay Haas (87) and Lee Westwood (76) as the player with the most starts without a major title.

=== Ryder Cup ===
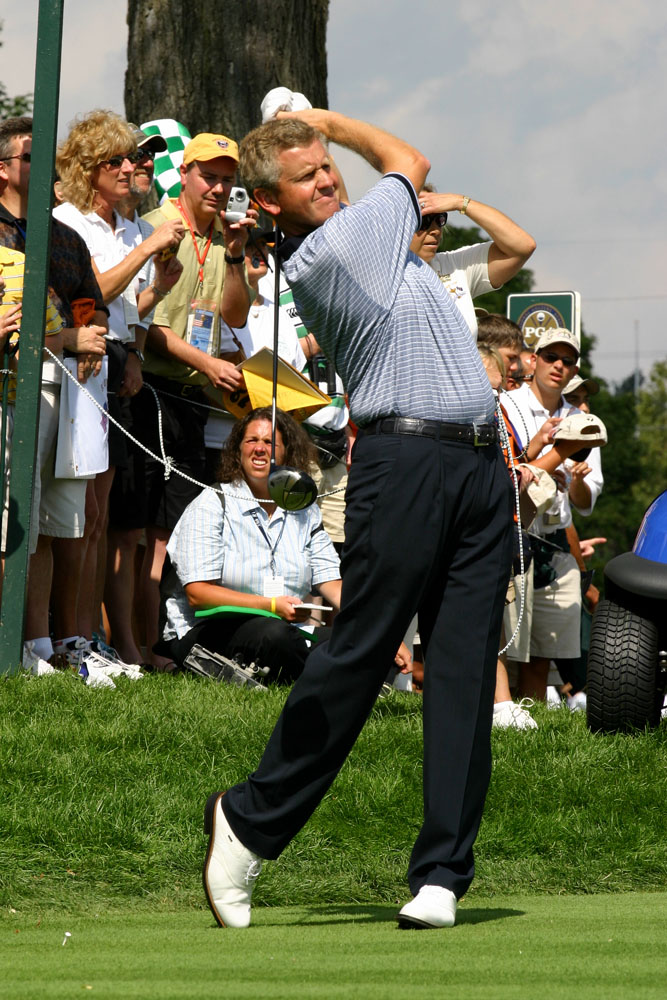
Practising before the 2004 Ryder Cup

Despite his disappointments in the majors, Montgomerie is heralded as one of the greatest Ryder Cup players of all time. To date he has been a member of the European team on eight occasions, and has never lost in a singles match. He holds a win-lose-draw record of 20–9–7, thus giving him a total points scored tally of 23.5, only 5 points behind the all-time record held by Sergio García. He has played pivotal roles in several of the matches. He halved the last hole with Scott Hoch to obtain the half-point that won Europe the cup in 1997, and sank the winning putt, in what is considered to be his finest hour in the 2004 staging of the event.

Montgomerie was not part of Nick Faldo's 2008 Ryder Cup team, with the wildcards going to Paul Casey and Ian Poulter. Montgomerie captained the Great Britain and Ireland team in the first four stagings of the Seve Trophy, losing in 2000 but winning in 2002, 2003, and 2005.

On 28 January 2009, it was announced that Montgomerie would be the captain the European team at the 2010 Ryder Cup at Celtic Manor. On 4 October 2010, Montgomerie led the European team to victory, 14 1/2 to 13 1/2. On the same day he also announced that he would be stepping down as captain of the European Team. In December 2010, he accepted the BBC Sports Personality Coach of the Year award as captain of the victorious Ryder Cup team.

Montgomerie has been the playing captain of the European team in the Royal Trophy, played against a team from Asia. Europe was successful on both those occasions. He has the distinction having been a victorious player and captain in the Ryder Cup, Seve Trophy and Royal Trophy.

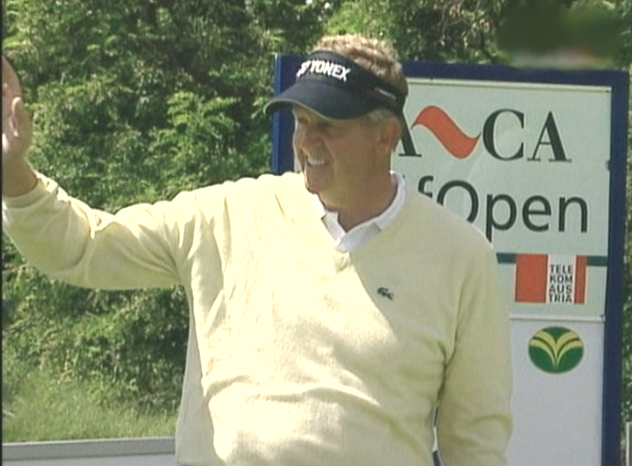
Colin Montgomerie at the Austrian Open 2006

In 2011, Montgomerie was named president of the English junior golf charity, the Golf Foundation, and in 2012 the Scottish first minister, Alex Salmond, named him as an ambassador for the Scottish junior golf programme, ClubGolf.

In March 2015, Montgomerie accepted the captaincy of London Scottish Golf Club in Wimbledon to mark that club's 150th anniversary.

Montgomerie was also a columnist for the Scottish golf magazine, Bunkered, between 2008 and 2010.

Montgomerie represents the Turnberry resort in Scotland, where there is a Colin Montgomerie Golf Academy.

== Personal life ==
Montgomerie met his first wife Eimear Wilson, from Troon, when he was a good amateur and she was a promotions assistant. She was a 17-year-old law student at Edinburgh University and a spectator at an amateur championship in Nairn, at which Montgomerie destroyed the field. The couple had three children, and lived in Oxshott, Surrey. In 2002, Eimear gave Montgomerie an ultimatum to choose between golf and marriage, resulting in Montgomerie spending 10 weeks alone before they agreed to try again.

In 2006, the couple finally broke up, with Eimear suing for divorce on grounds of "unreasonable behaviour due to his obsession with golf", claiming it left her suffering from anxiety and depression. In 2006, the couple agreed to a clean break divorce settlement of £8 million, in return for Eimear giving up any claim on Colin's future earnings.

Since the divorce, he has had various relationships, including Spanish model Inés Sastre, and a divorced neighbour Jo Baldwin, whom he met on the school run. Their split, he suggested, caused his worst run in his professional career.

In 2007, Montgomerie announced his engagement to Scottish millionairess Gaynor Knowles. The couple wed on 19 April 2008 at Loch Lomond Golf Club. On 8 July 2010, Montgomerie was granted a super injunction by Mr Justice Eady, which came to light when he attended a press conference at the 2010 PGA Championship in Wisconsin. In March 2017, he and Knowles divorced. Montgomerie married for the third time in 2023 to his manager, Sarah Casey.

== Awards and honours ==
- In 1988, Montgomerie was named by the European Tour the Sir Henry Cotton Rookie of the Year.
- Montgomerie won the European Tour's Order of Merit eight times: from 1993-1999 and in 2005.
- In 2004, he was named an Officer of the Order of the British Empire in the New Year's Honours.
- In 2013, Montgomerie was inducted to the World Golf Hall of Fame.
- In 2014 and 2015, he won the European Senior Tour's Order of Merit.

== Amateur wins ==
- 1985 Scottish Amateur Stroke Play Championship
- 1987 Scottish Amateur Championship

== Professional wins (54) ==
=== European Tour wins (31) ===
Legend
Flagship events (3)
Tour Championships (2)
Other European Tour (26)

No.	Date	Tournament	Winning score	Margin of victory	Runner(s)-up
1	22 Oct 1989	Portuguese Open TPC	−24 (67-65-69-63=264)	11 strokes	(Australia) Rodger Davis, (Spain) Manuel Moreno, (United States) Mike Smith
2	4 Aug 1991	Scandinavian Masters	−18 (68-65-70-67=270)	1 stroke	(Spain) Seve Ballesteros
3	25 Jul 1993	Heineken Dutch Open	−7 (68-73-71-69=281)	1 stroke	(Argentina) José Cóceres, (France) Jean van de Velde
4	7 Nov 1993	Volvo Masters	−10 (69-70-67-68=274)	1 stroke	(Northern Ireland) Darren Clarke
5	15 May 1994	Peugeot Spanish Open	−11 (70-71-66-70=277)	1 stroke	(England) Richard Boxall, (Zimbabwe) Mark McNulty, (England) Mark Roe
6	21 Aug 1994	Murphy's English Open	−14 (70-67-68-69=274)	1 stroke	(England) Barry Lane
7	28 Aug 1994	Volvo German Open	−19 (65-68-66-70=269)	1 stroke	(Germany) Bernhard Langer
8	27 Aug 1995	Volvo German Open (2)	−16 (69-64-68-67=268)	1 stroke	(Sweden) Niclas Fasth, (Scotland) Sam Torrance
9	10 Sep 1995	Trophée Lancôme	−11 (64-69-65-71=269)	1 stroke	(Scotland) Sam Torrance
10	17 Mar 1996	Dubai Desert Classic	−18 (67-68-67-68=270)	1 stroke	(Spain) Miguel Ángel Jiménez
11	7 Jul 1996	Murphy's Irish Open	−5 (69-69-73-68=279)	1 stroke	(Scotland) Andrew Oldcorn, (Australia) Wayne Riley
12	8 Sep 1996	Canon European Masters	−24 (65-71-61-63=260)	4 strokes	(Scotland) Sam Torrance
13	8 Jun 1997	Compaq European Grand Prix	−18 (69-68-68-65=270)	5 strokes	(South Africa) Retief Goosen
14	6 Jul 1997	Murphy's Irish Open (2)	−15 (68-70-69-62=269)	7 strokes	(England) Lee Westwood
15	25 May 1998	Volvo PGA Championship	−14 (70-70-65-69=274)	1 stroke	(South Africa) Ernie Els, (Scotland) Gary Orr, (Sweden) Patrik Sjöland
16	13 Sep 1998	One 2 One British Masters	−7 (70-72-70-69=281)	1 stroke	(Sweden) Pierre Fulke, (Argentina) Eduardo Romero
17	27 Sep 1998	Linde German Masters	−22 (65-68-66-67=266)	1 stroke	(Sweden) Robert Karlsson, (Fiji) Vijay Singh
18	16 May 1999	Benson & Hedges International Open	−15 (68-66-71-68=273)	3 strokes	(Argentina) Ángel Cabrera, (Sweden) Per-Ulrik Johansson
19	31 May 1999	Volvo PGA Championship (2)	−18 (69-70-67-64=270)	5 strokes	(England) Mark James
20	11 Jul 1999	Standard Life Loch Lomond	−16 (69-65-70-64=268)	3 strokes	(Spain) Sergio García, (Sweden) Michael Jonzon, (Sweden) Mats Lanner
21	8 Aug 1999	Volvo Scandinavian Masters (2)	−20 (67-67-65-69=268)	9 strokes	(Sweden) Jesper Parnevik
22	22 Aug 1999	BMW International Open	−20 (69-65-64-70=268)	3 strokes	(Republic of Ireland) Pádraig Harrington
23	7 May 2000	Novotel Perrier Open de France	−16 (71-68-65-68=272)	2 strokes	(England) Jonathan Lomas
24	29 May 2000	Volvo PGA Championship (3)	−17 (67-65-70-69=271)	3 strokes	(Northern Ireland) Darren Clarke, (Scotland) Andrew Coltart, (England) Lee Westwood
25	1 Jul 2001	Murphy's Irish Open (3)	−18 (63-69-68-66=266)	5 strokes	(Northern Ireland) Darren Clarke, (Sweden) Niclas Fasth, (Republic of Ireland) Pádraig Harrington
26	5 Aug 2001	Volvo Scandinavian Masters (3)	−14 (66-69-69-70=274)	1 stroke	(England) Ian Poulter, (England) Lee Westwood
27	10 Nov 2002	Volvo Masters Andalucía (2)	−3 (70-69-72-70=281)	Shared title with (Germany) Bernhard Langer (Note: Langer and Montgomerie agreed to share the 2002 Volvo Masters Andalucía after failing light caused play to halt after two holes of a playoff.)	
28	21 Mar 2004	Caltex Masters^{1}	−16 (71-69-67-65=272)	3 strokes	(United States) Gregory Hanrahan
29	2 Oct 2005	Dunhill Links Championship	−9 (70-65-73-71=279)	1 stroke	(England) Kenneth Ferrie
30	4 Dec 2005 (2006 season)	UBS Hong Kong Open^{1}	−9 (69-66-66-70=271)	1 stroke	(South Korea) K. J. Choi, (South Africa) James Kingston, (Taiwan) Lin Keng-chi, (United States) Edward Loar, (Thailand) Thammanoon Sriroj
31	8 Jul 2007	Smurfit Kappa European Open	−11 (69-71-64-65=269)	1 stroke	(Sweden) Niclas Fasth

^{1}Co-sanctioned by the Asian Tour

European Tour playoff record (0–7–1)

No.	Year	Tournament	Opponent(s)	Result
1	1991	Volvo PGA Championship	(Spain) Seve Ballesteros	Lost to birdie on first extra hole
2	1992	Volvo Masters	(Scotland) Sandy Lyle	Lost to par on first extra hole
3	1994	U.S. Open	(South Africa) Ernie Els, (United States) Loren Roberts	Els won with par on second extra hole after 18-hole playoff; Els: +3 (74), Roberts: +3 (74), Montgomerie: +7 (78)
4	1995	Murphy's English Open	(Republic of Ireland) Philip Walton	Lost to birdie on second extra hole
5	1995	PGA Championship	(Australia) Steve Elkington	Lost to birdie on first extra hole
6	1998	Murphy's Irish Open	(England) David Carter	Lost to par on first extra hole
7	2002	Deutsche Bank - SAP Open TPC of Europe	(United States) Tiger Woods	Lost to par on third extra hole
8	2002	Volvo Masters Andalucía	(Germany) Bernhard Langer	Playoff abandoned after two holes due to darkness; tournament shared

=== Asian Tour wins (4) ===
No.	Date	Tournament	Winning score	Margin of victory	Runner(s)-up
1	17 Nov 2002	TCL Classic	−16 (70-68-67-67=272)	2 strokes	(Thailand) Thongchai Jaidee
2	19 Oct 2003	Macau Open	−11 (66-72-67-68=273)	Playoff	(Australia) Scott Barr
3	21 Mar 2004	Caltex Masters^{1}	−16 (71-69-67-65=272)	3 strokes	(United States) Gregory Hanrahan
4	4 Dec 2005	UBS Hong Kong Open^{1}	−9 (69-66-66-70=271)	1 stroke	(South Korea) K. J. Choi, (South Africa) James Kingston, (Taiwan) Lin Keng-chi, (United States) Edward Loar, (Thailand) Thammanoon Sriroj

^{1}Co-sanctioned by the European Tour

Asian Tour playoff record (1–0)

No.	Year	Tournament	Opponent	Result
1	2003	Macau Open	(Australia) Scott Barr	Won with birdie on first extra hole

=== PGA Tour of Australasia wins (1) ===
No.	Date	Tournament	Winning score	Margin of victory	Runner-up
1	18 Feb 2001	Ericsson Masters	−10 (72-67-70-69=278)	1 stroke	(Australia) Nathan Green

=== Other wins (7) ===
No.	Date	Tournament	Winning score	Margin of victory	Runner(s)-up
1	1 Dec 1996	Nedbank Million Dollar Challenge	−14 (66-71-70-68=274)	Playoff	(South Africa) Ernie Els
2	4 Jan 1997	Andersen Consulting World Championship of Golf	2 up		(United States) Davis Love III
3	18 Nov 1997	Hassan II Golf Trophy	−15 (73-68-67-69=277)	3 strokes	(United States) Donnie Hammond, (England) David Howell, (Sweden) Henrik Nyström
4	23 Nov 1997	World Cup of Golf Individual Trophy	−22 (68-66-66-66=266)	2 strokes	(Germany) Alex Čejka
5	17 Oct 1999	Cisco World Match Play Championship	3 and 2		(United States) Mark O'Meara
6	25 Nov 2000	Skins Game	$415,000	$155,000	(Fiji) Vijay Singh
7	25 Nov 2007	Omega Mission Hills World Cup (with (Scotland) Marc Warren)	−25 (63-68-66-66=263)	Playoff	United States − Heath Slocum and Boo Weekley

Other playoff record (2–1)

No.	Year	Tournament	Opponent(s)	Result
1	1996	Nedbank Million Dollar Challenge	(South Africa) Ernie Els	Won with birdie on third extra hole
2	2006	WGC-World Cup (with (Scotland) Marc Warren)	Germany − Bernhard Langer and Marcel Siem	Lost to par on first extra hole
3	2007	Omega Mission Hills World Cup (with (Scotland) Marc Warren)	United States − Heath Slocum and Boo Weekley	Won with par on third extra hole

=== PGA Tour Champions wins (7) ===
Legend
Senior major championships (3)
Charles Schwab Cup playoff events (1)
Other PGA Tour Champions (3)

No.	Date	Tournament	Winning score	Margin of victory	Runner(s)-up
1	25 May 2014	Senior PGA Championship	−13 (69-69-68-65=271)	4 strokes	(United States) Tom Watson
2	13 Jul 2014	U.S. Senior Open	−5 (65-71-74-69=279)	Playoff	(United States) Gene Sauers
3	24 May 2015	Senior PGA Championship (2)	−8 (72-69-70-69=280)	4 strokes	(Mexico) Esteban Toledo
4	25 Sep 2016	Pacific Links Bear Mountain Championship	−15 (67-64-67=198)	Playoff	(United States) Scott McCarron
5	10 Sep 2017	Japan Airlines Championship	−14 (69-66-67=202)	1 stroke	(United States) Billy Mayfair, (United States) Scott McCarron
6	15 Oct 2017	SAS Championship	−16 (69-67-64=200)	3 strokes	(United States) Doug Garwood, (Fiji) Vijay Singh
7	3 Nov 2019	Invesco QQQ Championship	−14 (69-70-63=202)	Playoff	(Germany) Bernhard Langer

PGA Tour Champions playoff record (3–0)

No.	Year	Tournament	Opponent	Result
1	2014	U.S. Senior Open	(United States) Gene Sauers	Won three-hole aggregate playoff; Montgomerie: E (5-3-4=12), Sauers: x (5-4-x=x)
2	2016	Pacific Links Bear Mountain Championship	(United States) Scott McCarron	Won with birdie on third extra hole
3	2019	Invesco QQQ Championship	(Germany) Bernhard Langer	Won with par on first extra hole

=== European Senior Tour wins (9) ===
Legend
Senior major championships (3)
Tour Championships (1)
Other European Senior Tour (5)

No.	Date	Tournament	Winning score	Margin of victory	Runner(s)-up
1	1 Sep 2013	Travis Perkins plc Senior Masters	−10 (68-68-70=206)	6 strokes	(Spain) Miguel Ángel Martín, (England) Paul Wesselingh
2	25 May 2014	Senior PGA Championship	−13 (69-69-68-65=271)	4 strokes	(United States) Tom Watson
3	13 Jul 2014	U.S. Senior Open	−5 (65-71-74-69=279)	Playoff	(United States) Gene Sauers
4	31 Aug 2014	Travis Perkins Masters (2)	−12 (68-69-67=204)	10 strokes	(Switzerland) André Bossert, (Austria) Gordon Manson, (United States) Tim Thelen
5	7 Sep 2014	Russian Open Golf Championship (Senior)	−14 (69-68-65=202)	3 strokes	(Canada) Rick Gibson
6	24 May 2015	Senior PGA Championship (2)	−8 (72-69-70-69=280)	4 strokes	(Mexico) Esteban Toledo
7	6 Sep 2015	Travis Perkins Masters (3)	−5 (73-67-71=211)	Playoff	(Scotland) Ross Drummond
8	13 Dec 2015	MCB Tour Championship	−15 (68-64-69=201)	3 strokes	(South Africa) David Frost
9	3 Jun 2018	Shipco Masters	−11 (71-67-67=205)	3 strokes	(England) Paul Eales, (England) Barry Lane

European Senior Tour playoff record (2–0)

No.	Year	Tournament	Opponent	Result
1	2014	U.S. Senior Open	(United States) Gene Sauers	Won three-hole aggregate playoff; Montgomerie: E (5-3-4=12), Sauers: x (5-4-x=x)
2	2015	Travis Perkins Masters	(Scotland) Ross Drummond	Won with birdie on second extra hole

== Results in major championships ==
Tournament	1990	1991	1992	1993	1994	1995	1996	1997	1998	1999
Masters Tournament			T37	T52	CUT	T17	T39	T30	T8	T11
U.S. Open			3	T33	T2	T28	T10	2	T18	T15
The Open Championship	T48	T26	CUT	CUT	T8	CUT	CUT	T24	CUT	T15
PGA Championship			T33	CUT	T36	2	CUT	T13	T44	T6

Tournament	2000	2001	2002	2003	2004	2005	2006	2007	2008	2009
Masters Tournament	T19	CUT	T14	CUT	CUT		CUT	CUT		
U.S. Open	T46	T52	CUT	T42		T42	T2	CUT	CUT	
The Open Championship	T26	T13	82	WD	T25	2	CUT	CUT	T58	CUT
PGA Championship	T39	DQ	CUT	CUT	70	CUT	CUT	T42	CUT	CUT

Tournament	2010	2011	2012	2013	2014	2015	2016
Masters Tournament							
U.S. Open						T64	
The Open Championship	T68						78
PGA Championship	CUT				T69	CUT	

Top 10
Did not play

CUT = missed the half-way cut
WD = withdrew
DQ = disqualified
"T" = tied

=== Summary ===
Tournament	Wins	2nd	3rd	Top-5	Top-10	Top-25	Events	Cuts made
Masters Tournament	0	0	0	0	1	5	15	9
U.S. Open	0	3	1	4	5	7	17	14
The Open Championship	0	1	0	1	2	6	22	13
PGA Championship	0	1	0	1	2	3	21	10
Totals	0	5	1	6	10	21	75	46

- Most consecutive cuts made – 9 (1998 PGA – 2000 PGA)
- Longest streak of top-10s – 2 (1994 U.S. Open – 1994 Open Championship)

== Results in The Players Championship ==
Tournament	1992	1993	1994	1995	1996	1997	1998	1999
The Players Championship	CUT		T9	T14	T2	T7	CUT	T23

Tournament	2000	2001	2002	2003	2004	2005	2006	2007
The Players Championship	T3	T40	T63	CUT	T42		CUT	CUT

Top 10
Did not play

CUT = missed the halfway cut
"T" indicates a tie for a place

== Results in World Golf Championships ==
Tournament	1999	2000	2001	2002	2003	2004	2005	2006	2007	2008
Match Play	R64	R32		R64	R64	R16		R32	R32	R16
Championship	T20	T25	NT^{1}	T31	T51		T3	T41	T55	T65
Invitational	T30	T8	4	WD	T23	T58	T9		T41	77

^{1}Cancelled due to 9/11

Top 10
Did not play

WD = Withdrew
QF, R16, R32, R64 = Round in which player lost in match play
"T" = tied
NT = No Tournament

== Senior major championships ==
=== Wins (3) ===
Year	Championship	54 holes	Winning score	Margin	Runner-up
2014	Senior PGA Championship	1 shot lead	−13 (69-69-68-65=271)	4 strokes	(United States) Tom Watson
2014	U.S. Senior Open	4 shot deficit	−5 (65-71-74-69=279)	Playoff	(United States) Gene Sauers
2015	Senior PGA Championship (2)	3 shot lead	−8 (72-69-70-69=280)	4 strokes	(Mexico) Esteban Toledo

=== Results timeline ===
Results are not in chronological order.

Tournament	2013	2014	2015	2016	2017	2018	2019	2020	2021	2022	2023	2024	2025	2026
Senior PGA Championship	–	1	1	2	T17	T6	T21	NT	CUT	T8	T15	T43	T58	T41
The Tradition	–	T16	T24	T17	T25	T27	WD	NT	T39	T18	T23	T67	T52	3
U.S. Senior Open	T30	1	2	T11	T42	T38	T24	NT	T34	T28	T23	CUT		T42
Senior Players Championship	T9	T15	T3	T13	T6	T43	T13	T3	T12	T25	T27	T44	T40	
The Senior Open Championship	T21	2	3	CUT	T23	T14	T18	NT	T11	9	68	T37	T31	CUT

Win
Top 10
Did not play

WD = withdrew
CUT = missed the halfway cut
"T" indicates a tie for a place
NT = no tournament due to COVID-19 pandemic

== Team appearances ==
Amateur

- European Youths' Team Championship (representing Scotland): 1982 (winners), 1984
- Eisenhower Trophy (representing Great Britain & Ireland): 1984, 1986
- European Amateur Team Championship (representing Scotland): 1985 (winners), 1987
- Walker Cup (representing Great Britain & Ireland): 1985, 1987
- St Andrews Trophy (representing Great Britain & Ireland): 1986 (winners)

Professional

- Alfred Dunhill Cup (representing Scotland): 1988, 1991, 1992, 1993, 1994, 1995 (winners), 1996, 1997, 1998, 2000
- World Cup (representing Scotland): 1988, 1991, 1992, 1993, 1997 (individual winner), 1998, 1999, 2006, 2007 (winners), 2008
- Four Tours World Championship (representing Europe): 1991 (winners)
- Ryder Cup (representing Europe): 1991, 1993, 1995 (winners), 1997 (winners), 1999, 2002 (winners), 2004 (winners), 2006 (winners), 2010 (non-playing captain, winners)

Ryder Cup points
1991	1993	1995	1997	1999	2002	2004	2006	Total
1.5	3.5	2	3.5	3.5	4.5	3	2	23.5

- Seve Trophy (representing Great Britain & Ireland): 2000 (playing captain), 2002 (playing captain, winners), 2003 (playing captain, winners), 2005 (playing captain, winners), 2007 (winners)
- UBS Cup (representing the Rest of the World): 2003 (tie), 2004
- Royal Trophy (representing Europe): 2010 (playing captain, winners), 2011 (playing captain, winners)

== See also ==
- List of golfers with most European Tour wins
- List of golfers with most European Senior Tour wins
