= David Howell (golfer) =

English professional golfer (born 1975)

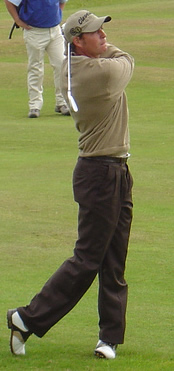

Personal information
- Full name: David Alexander Howell
- Nationality: England
- Born: 23 June 1975 (age 51) Swindon, Wiltshire, England
- Height: 6 ft 1 in (1.85 m)
- Weight: 175 lb (79 kg; 12.5 st)
- Spouse: Emily
- Children: 3

Career
- Sport: Golf
- Turned professional: 1995
- Current tour: European Tour (joined 1996)
- Former tour: PGA Tour (2006–07)
- Professional wins: 7
- Highest ranking: 9 (11 June 2006)

Number of wins by tour
- European Tour: 5
- PGA Tour of Australasia: 1
- Other: 1

Best results in major championships
- Masters Tournament: T11: 2005
- PGA Championship: T45: 2004
- U.S. Open: T16: 2006
- The Open Championship: T7: 2008

David Alexander Howell (born 23 June 1975) is an English professional golfer. His career peaked in 2006, when he won the BMW Championship and was ranked in the top 10 of the Official World Golf Ranking for a short time. He played in the Ryder Cup in 2004 and 2006. Howell holds the record for most starts on the European Tour.

== Career ==
After training and competing at Broome Manor Golf Club, he became a professional golfer in 1995. He won the 1998 Australian PGA Championship, and the 1999 Dubai Desert Classic. He had no further wins for six years, but his form was nonetheless on a general upwards curve. He was tenth on the European Tour Order of Merit in 2004 and 2005 proved to be even better. In the spring he had back to back second places in The Daily Telegraph Dunlop Masters and the Nissan Irish Open, and in August, won the BMW International Open. By the autumn he reached the top 20 in the world rankings.

In November 2005, he won the inaugural HSBC Champions tournament, the first event of the 2006 European Tour season. The win took him to a career high of number 13 in the Official World Golf Ranking, making him the highest-ranked British player and the second highest-ranked European at that time. In May 2006, he won the BMW Championship and moved into the world top ten for the first time. In June he moved to a new high of ninth. After leading the Order of Merit for most of the 2006 season, he eventually finished in 3rd place; a back injury caused his form to suffer in the latter half of the season and limited his appearances through 2007.

In 2013, Howell had his first European Tour win in seven years at the Alfred Dunhill Links Championship, beating American Peter Uihlein in a playoff. Howell had previously gone 0–4 in European Tour playoffs.

In 2014, Howell became the second youngest player in history to reach 500 appearances on European Tour when he played at the Open de France.

Howell won the Beko Classic, a tournament sanctioned by the PGAs of Europe, by 5 shots after rounds of 70, 69 and 67 at the Montgomerie Maxx Royal in Turkey in 2015.

The season 2017 proved to be Howell's most disappointing on tour and, speaking in December, said it had been 'two years of hell'. His season was ravaged by back and wrist injuries and he made only five halfway cuts from 20 events, the fewest he has ever made in a whole season resulting in his worst ever Order of Merit ranking.

He suffered another injury setback in January 2018 with a shoulder injury forcing him to retire from the BMW South African Open.

At the Nordea Masters in August 2018, Howell became just the tenth player in the European Tour's history to reach 600 career appearances.

Howell was a member of the winning European Ryder Cup teams in 2004 and 2006. As a member of the Great Britain & Ireland team in the Seve Trophy he was on the losing side in 2000, but a winner in 2003. He has also represented Europe at the Royal Trophy twice in 2006 and 2013 and has been on the winning side on both occasions. He came from 3 down with 4 to play to win his singles match in 2013 against Kim Hyung-sung as Europe pulled off an impressive fightback.

In 2014, Howell was named as part of a five-man selection panel deciding Europe's 2016 Ryder Cup captain. The panel unanimously appointed Darren Clarke to the role.

In January 2017, it was announced that Howell had been voted unanimously to succeed Thomas Bjørn as chairman of the European Tour's Tournament Committee.

In August 2022 at the Cazoo Classic, Howell became just the third player, after Sam Torrence and Miguel Ángel Jiménez, to reach 700 career appearances on the European Tour and the youngest to ever do so. He surpassed Jiménez for most European Tour starts at the 2023 Alfred Dunhill Links Championship, Howell's 722nd event. Howell ended the 2024 season with 726 European Tour starts.

Howell is represented by Octagon.

He also occasionally works for Sky Sports as a commentator and analyst as well as writing regular columns for The Golf Paper and Worldwide Golf. He is sponsored by Titleist and plays with the Titleist ProV1x ball. He was sponsored by Adams Golf for three years from May 2013 but has since returned to TaylorMade.

== Amateur wins ==
- 1993 Boys Amateur Championship

== Professional wins (7) ==
=== European Tour wins (5) ===
Legend
Flagship events (1)
Other European Tour (4)

No.	Date	Tournament	Winning score	Margin of victory	Runner(s)-up
1	14 Feb 1999	Dubai Desert Classic	−13 (69-68-71-67=275)	4 strokes	(England) Lee Westwood
2	28 Aug 2005	BMW International Open	−23 (66-68-66-65=265)	1 stroke	(United States) John Daly, (Australia) Brett Rumford
3	13 Nov 2005 (2006 season)	HSBC Champions^{1}	−20 (65-67-68-68=268)	3 strokes	(United States) Tiger Woods
4	28 May 2006	BMW Championship	−17 (68-65-69-69=271)	5 strokes	(England) Simon Khan
5	29 Sep 2013	Alfred Dunhill Links Championship	−23 (67-68-63-67=265)	Playoff	(United States) Peter Uihlein

^{1}Co-sanctioned by the Asian Tour, Sunshine Tour and PGA Tour of Australasia, but unofficial event on those tours.

European Tour playoff record (1–4)

No.	Year	Tournament	Opponent(s)	Result
1	2001	Victor Chandler British Masters	(Sweden) Mathias Grönberg, (Sweden) Robert Karlsson, (France) Thomas Levet	Levet won with birdie on third extra hole Howell and Karlsson eliminated by par on first hole
2	2005	Daily Telegraph Dunlop Masters	(Denmark) Thomas Bjørn, (England) Brian Davis	Bjørn won with par on second extra hole Davis eliminated by par on first hole
3	2005	Nissan Irish Open	(Wales) Stephen Dodd	Lost to birdie on first extra hole
4	2008	Estoril Open de Portugal	(France) Grégory Bourdy, (Scotland) Alastair Forsyth	Bourdy won with birdie on third extra hole Forsyth eliminated by par on second hole
5	2013	Alfred Dunhill Links Championship	(United States) Peter Uihlein	Won with birdie on second extra hole

=== PGA Tour of Australasia wins (1) ===
No.	Date	Tournament	Winning score	Margin of victory	Runner-up
1	22 Nov 1998	MasterCard Australian PGA Championship	−13 (69-66-72-68=275)	7 strokes	(Trinidad and Tobago) Stephen Ames, (Australia) Terry Price

=== Other wins (1) ===
No.	Date	Tournament	Winning score	Margin of victory	Runners-up
1	6 Dec 2015	Beko Classic	−11 (70-68-67=205)	5 strokes	(England) Jamie Elson, (Sweden) Pontus Widegren

== Results in major championships ==
Tournament	1997	1998	1999
Masters Tournament			
U.S. Open			
The Open Championship	CUT	T44	T45
PGA Championship			

Tournament	2000	2001	2002	2003	2004	2005	2006	2007	2008	2009
Masters Tournament						T11	T19	T44		
U.S. Open			CUT			WD	T16			
The Open Championship		CUT	CUT	CUT	CUT		CUT	T53	T7	T52
PGA Championship					T45	CUT	67	CUT		

Tournament	2010	2011	2012	2013	2014	2015	2016
Masters Tournament							
U.S. Open		CUT		T65			
The Open Championship					T15	T49	T22
PGA Championship						CUT	

Top 10
Did not play

CUT = missed the halfway cut
WD = withdrew
"T" indicates a tie for a place.

=== Summary ===
Tournament	Wins	2nd	3rd	Top-5	Top-10	Top-25	Events	Cuts made
Masters Tournament	0	0	0	0	0	2	3	3
U.S. Open	0	0	0	0	0	1	5	2
The Open Championship	0	0	0	0	1	3	14	8
PGA Championship	0	0	0	0	0	0	5	2
Totals	0	0	0	0	1	6	27	15

- Most consecutive cuts made – 3 (twice)
- Longest streak of top-10s – 1

== Results in The Players Championship ==
Tournament	2005	2006	2007
The Players Championship	CUT	T38	WD

CUT = missed the halfway cut
WD = withdrew
"T" indicates a tie for a place

== Results in World Golf Championships ==
Tournament	2003	2004	2005	2006	2007	2008	2009	2010	2011	2012	2013	2014	2015
Match Play			R32	QF	R64								
Championship	T28	3	T6	T13	T55								
Invitational			T6	T59	T61	T73						T52	
Champions											70		T30

Top 10
Did not play

QF, R16, R32, R64 = Round in which player lost in match play
"T" = tied
Note that the HSBC Champions did not become a WGC event until 2009.

== Team appearances ==
Amateur

- Jacques Léglise Trophy (representing Great Britain & Ireland): 1993 (winners)
- European Youths' Team Championship (representing England): 1994
- Walker Cup (representing Great Britain & Ireland): 1995

Professional

- Alfred Dunhill Cup (representing England): 1999
- Seve Trophy (representing Great Britain & Ireland): 2000, 2003 (winners), 2005 (winners)
- Ryder Cup (representing Europe): 2004 (winners), 2006 (winners)
- WGC-World Cup (representing England): 2005, 2006
- Royal Trophy (representing Europe): 2006 (winners), 2013 (winners)
