= Wentworth Club =

Golf club in Surrey, England

Coordinates: 51°23′48″N 0°35′45″W

- Interactive map of Wentworth Club

Club information
- Location: Virginia Water, Surrey, England
- Established: 1922
- Type: Private
- Owner: Reignwood Group
- Tota holes: 63
- Tournaments: BMW PGA Championship
- Website: www.wentworthclub.com

West Course
- Designed by: Harry Colt; Ernie Els (2005–2017)
- Par: 72
- Length: 7,284
- Course record: 62 Robert Karlsson (2010); 62 Thomas Bjørn (2014); 62 Alex Norén (2017)

East Course
- Designed by: Harry Colt
- Par: 68
- Length: 6,201
- Course record: 62 Doug Sewell

Edinburgh Course
- Designed by: John Jacobs
- Par: 72
- Length: 7,004
- Course record: 67 Gary Orr

Executive Course (9 Holes)
- Par: 27
- Length: 1,902

Wentworth Club is a privately owned golf club and country club in Virginia Water, Surrey, on the south western fringes of London, not far from Windsor Castle. The club was founded in 1922. Beijing-based Reignwood Group bought the club in September 2014 and implemented a new debenture membership structure, starting at £100,000. The debenture is now estimated at £200,000.

Wentworth is home to the headquarters of the PGA European Tour, the professional golf tour. Each year, it hosts the Tour's PGA Championship, which is played on the club's West Course. Wentworth was the venue of the 1953 Ryder Cup and of the World Match Play Championship from 1964 until 2007.

== History ==
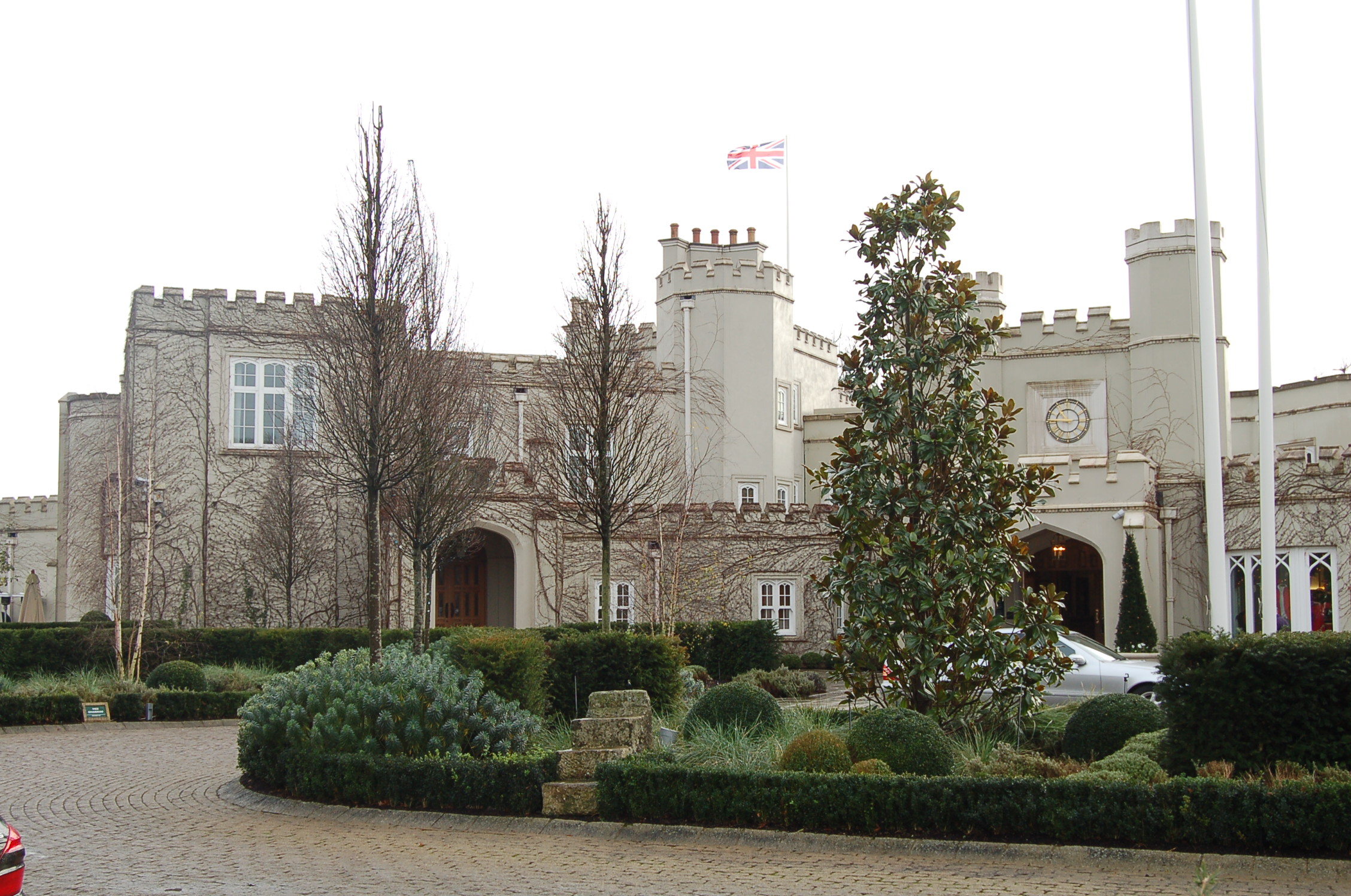
The clubhouse at Wentworth

A 19th-century house named the "Wentworths" (now the clubhouse for Wentworth Club) was the residence of the brother-in-law of the 1st Duke of Wellington. It was purchased in 1850 by an exiled Spanish Carlist military commander, Ramón Cabrera, 1st Count of Morella (Carlist title) and 1st Marquis of Ter (Bourbon title), and his heiress wife.

After the death of Cabrera in 1877, his widow (née Catherine Anne Vaughn-Richards) bought up the surrounding lands under The Cabrera Trust to safeguard the meadows, brooks and trees (planted from her travels on the continent with her gentrified husband) to form what has become the heart of the Wentworth Estate.

In 1912, builder W. G. Tarrant had started developing St George's Hill in Weybridge – a development of houses based on minimum 1-acre (4,000 m^{2}) plots around a golf course. In 1922, Tarrant acquired the development rights for the Wentworth Estate, getting Harry Colt to design a golf course around the "Wentworths" house. Tarrant erected large residences on the estate using a similar Surrey formula to that used at St George's Hill. However, the development of the Wentworth Estate ground to a halt due to the Great Depression at the end of the 1920s. In 1931, when the banks asked for repayment of a large debenture, Tarrant was forced to declare bankruptcy. Ownership of the land passed to Wentworth Estates Ltd, which came under the control of Sir Lindsay Parkinson & Company.

In 1988, Elliott Bernerd's property investment company Chelsfield bought Wentworth Golf Club for £17.7 million (also reported as £20 million). Bernerd sold 40% of the club to Japanese investors, raising £32 million, in 1989. In 2004, Chelsfield sold the remaining 60% share, as fashion industry entrepreneur Richard Caring bought the club for £130 million. In 2014 Caring sold the club for £135m to Beijing-based Reignwood Investments (a holding company associated with billionaire Yan Bin), which raised the fees and cut the number of members. Current debentures cost £175,000 and the annual fees is £16,000.

== Today ==
Wentworth Club is best known for its associations with professional golf. It has three eighteen-hole courses: the famous Harry Colt-designed West Course from 1926, the earlier yet lesser-played East Course, which was also designed by Colt in 1924, the recent Edinburgh Course designed by John Jacobs, and a nine-hole par-3 executive course.

The headquarters of the PGA European Tour is located at the club, and each year it hosts the Tour's PGA Championship. It was the venue of the 1953 Ryder Cup and of the World Match Play Championship from 1964 until 2007.

The club is surrounded by and entwined with the Wentworth Estate, one of the most expensive private estates in the London suburbs, which was built simultaneously, where many top golfers and other celebrities have homes. One of them is Ernie Els, who became the club's "world-wide touring professional" in 2005. Over the winter of 2005-06 Els, who was developing a golf course design practice, made alterations to the West Course, lengthening it by 310 yards (280 m) and adding 30 bunkers.

Wentworth also has a tennis and health club. The Wentworth Tennis and Health Club comprises a gymnasium, dance studio, health spa, ozone swimming pool and Jacuzzi, crèche facilities, changing rooms, and a café. The extensive facility was completed in 1999 for £9 million by architects Broadway Malyan.

== Golf courses ==
=== West Course ===
- Opened: 1926
- Architect: Harry Colt (redesigned from 2005 to 2017 by Ernie Els)
- Par: 72
- Length: 7,284 yards (6,660 m)
- Course Record: 62, Robert Karlsson, Thomas Bjørn, Alex Norén
- Key tournaments: HSBC World Match Play Championship, 1964 – 2007: BMW PGA Championship, 1984 – present: Ryder Cup, 1953: World Cup 1956

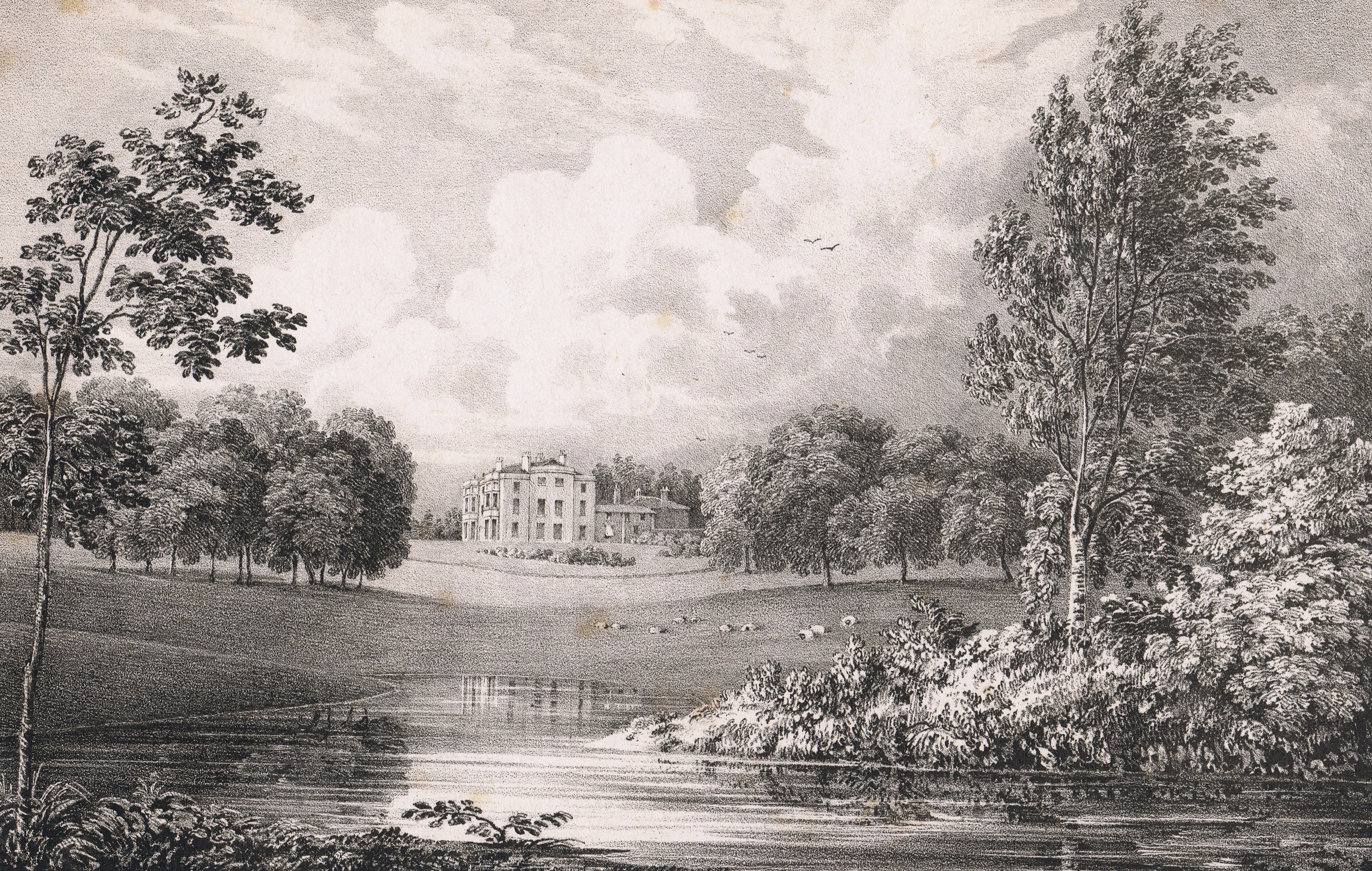
View of Portnall Park, from the south-east, published in 1828. Once the heart of Colonel Bisse-Challoner's c. 400-acre (+200 rented) estate, it is now known as the Dormy House. The sheep mark the position of the present fairway.

West Course Scorecard

Hole No.	Metres	Yards	Par	Hole No.	Metres	Yards	Par
1	432	473	4	10	168	184	3
2	141	154	3	11	380	416	4
3	425	465	4	12	486	531	5
4	505	552	5	13	430	470	4
5	194	203	3	14	164	179	3
6	382	418	4	15	436	489	4
7	362	396	4	16	350	383	4
8	367	391	4	17	558	610	5
9	410	449	4	18	492	521	5
Front 9	3218	3501	35	Back 9	3464	3783	37
				Total	6682	7284	72

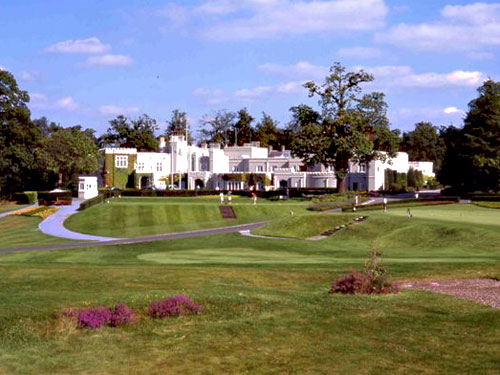
View of the course and clubhouse

=== East Course ===
- Opened: 1924
- Architect: Harry Colt
- Par: 68
- Length: 6,201 yards (5,670 m)
- Course Record: 62, Doug N Sewell
- Key tournaments: inaugural Curtis Cup, 1932; friendly match between US and GB&I (forerunner to Ryder Cup) 1926.

East Course Scorecard

Hole No.	Metres	Yards	Par	Hole No.	Metres	Yards	Par
1	351	384	4	10	175	191	3
2	385	421	4	11	422	462	4
3	304	332	4	12	145	159	3
4	178	195	3	13	369	403	4
5	299	327	4	14	295	323	4
6	324	354	4	15	303	331	4
7	207	226	3	16	420	459	4
8	417	456	4	17	197	215	3
9	481	526	5	18	400	437	4
Front 9	2945	3221	35	Back 9	2725	2980	33
				Total	5670	6201	68

=== Edinburgh Course ===
- Opened: 1990
- Architect: John Jacobs (with Gary Player and Bernard Gallacher)
- Par: 72
- Length: 7,004 yards (6,404 m)
- Course Record: 67, Gary Orr
- Tournaments held: Wentworth Senior Masters

Edinburgh Course Scorecard

Hole No.	Metres	Yards	Par	Hole No.	Metres	Yards	Par
1	420	459	4	10	467	511	5
2	132	144	3	11	401	439	4
3	458	501	5	12	155	169	3
4	367	401	4	13	387	423	4
5	157	172	3	14	364	398	4
6	422	461	4	15	360	394	4
7	555	607	5	16	481	526	5
8	416	455	4	17	148	162	3
9	334	365	4	18	432	472	4
Front 9	3260	3565	36	Back 9	3195	3494	36
				Total	6455	7059	72

=== Executive Course (9 Holes) ===
- Par: 27
- Length: 1,902 yards (1,739 m)
