= 2013 in golf =

This article summarizes the highlights of professional and amateur golf in the year 2013.

== Men's professional golf ==
Major championships

- 11–14 April: Masters Tournament – Adam Scott won in a playoff against Ángel Cabrera with a birdie on the second playoff hole. He became the first Australian to win the Masters.
- 13–16 June: U.S. Open – Justin Rose won his first major championship. He became the first man from mainland U.K. to win the U.S. Open since Tony Jacklin in 1970.
- 18–21 July: The Open Championship – Phil Mickelson won his first Open Championship, and his fifth major overall. It was also the second week in a row he won on the European Tour, both wins coming in Scotland.
- 8–11 August: PGA Championship – Jason Dufner won his first major championship.

World Golf Championships

- 20–24 February: WGC-Accenture Match Play Championship – American Matt Kuchar defeated 2012 winner Hunter Mahan in the final, 2 and 1.
- 7–10 March WGC-Cadillac Championship – American Tiger Woods won by two strokes over Steve Stricker. It was the seventh time Woods won the event and his 17th WGC win.
- 1–4 August: WGC-Bridgestone Invitational – American Tiger Woods won by seven strokes over Keegan Bradley and Henrik Stenson. It was the eighth time Woods won the event and his 18th WGC win.
- 31 October – 3 November: WGC-HSBC Champions – American Dustin Johnson won by three strokes over defending champion Ian Poulter. It was his first WGC win.

FedEx Cup playoff events - see 2013 FedEx Cup Playoffs

- 22–25 August: The Barclays – Australian Adam Scott won from the clubhouse. It was his first win since the Masters Tournament earlier in the year.
- 30 August – 2 September: Deutsche Bank Championship – Swede Henrik Stenson won, tying the tournament record. It was also his first win on the PGA Tour since the 2009 Players Championship.
- 12–15 September: BMW Championship – Zach Johnson won. It was his first win since the 2012 John Deere Classic.
- 19–22 September: Tour Championship – Swede Henrik Stenson won his second playoff event of the year and won the FedEx Cup.

Other leading PGA Tour events

- 9–12 May: The Players Championship – Tiger Woods won by two shots over a group of three players for his second Players title.

For a complete list of PGA Tour results see 2013 PGA Tour.

Leading European Tour events

- 16–19 May: Volvo World Match Play Championship – Graeme McDowell of Northern Ireland defeated Thongchai Jaidee of Thailand, 2 & 1, in the final.
- 23–26 May: BMW PGA Championship – Matteo Manassero of Italy won on the fourth hole of a sudden-death playoff.
- 24–27 October: BMW Masters – Gonzalo Fernández-Castaño of Spain won by one stroke ahead of Francesco Molinari and Thongchai Jaidee. It was his 7th European Tour win.
- 7–10 November: Turkish Airlines Open – Victor Dubuisson of France won, gaining a two-stroke victory over runner-up Jamie Donaldson. It was Dubuisson's first professional golf win.
- 14–17 November: DP World Tour Championship, Dubai – Swede Henrik Stenson won by six strokes over Ian Poulter. He also won the Race to Dubai, making him the first golfer to win both the FedEx Cup and the Race to Dubai.

For a complete list of European Tour results see 2013 European Tour.

Team events

- 3–6 October: Presidents Cup – The U.S. team won, 18½–15½, for the fifth straight time.
- 3–6 October: Seve Trophy – Continental Europe won, 15–13, for the first time since the inaugural Seve Trophy in 2000.
- 21–24 November: World Cup of Golf – Australian Jason Day won the individual competition by two strokes over Denmark's Thomas Bjørn. Day teamed with Adam Scott to win the team portion by 10 strokes over the United States.
- 20–22 December: Royal Trophy – Europe defeated Asia, 8½–7½, by winning five of the last six singles matches.

Tour leaders

- PGA Tour – (United States) Tiger Woods (US$8,553,439)
  - This total does not include FedEx Cup bonuses.
- European Tour – (Sweden) Henrik Stenson (4,103,796 points)
  - This total includes the US$1.0 million (€739,125) bonus for winning the Race to Dubai.
- Japan Golf Tour – Hideki Matsuyama (¥201,076,781)
- Asian Tour – (Thailand) Kiradech Aphibarnrat (US$1,127,855)
- PGA Tour of Australasia – (Australia) Adam Scott (A$538,620)
- Sunshine Tour – (South Africa) Dawie van der Walt (R5,094,333)

Awards

- PGA Tour
  - FedEx Cup – (Sweden) Henrik Stenson won the FedEx Cup after winning the Tour Championship.
  - PGA Player of the Year – (United States) Tiger Woods
  - Player of the Year (Jack Nicklaus Trophy) – (United States) Tiger Woods
  - Leading money winner (Arnold Palmer Award) – (United States) Tiger Woods (US$8,553,439)
  - Vardon Trophy – (United States) Tiger Woods
  - Byron Nelson Award – (United States) Steve Stricker
  - Rookie of the Year – (United States) Jordan Spieth
  - Payne Stewart Award – (United States) Peter Jacobsen
- European Tour
  - Golfer of the Year – (Sweden) Henrik Stenson
  - Rookie of the Year – (United States) Peter Uihlein
- Web.com Tour
  - Player of the Year – (United States) Michael Putnam

Results from other tours

- 2013 Asian Tour
- 2013 PGA Tour of Australasia
- 2013 PGA Tour Canada
- 2013 Challenge Tour
- 2013 Japan Golf Tour
- 2013 OneAsia Tour
- 2013 PGA Tour Latinoamérica
- 2013 Sunshine Tour
- 2013 Web.com Tour

Other happenings

- 13 January – Russell Henley won the Sony Open in Hawaii, becoming the first PGA Tour rookie to win his debut event since Garrett Willis won the 2001 Touchstone Energy Tucson Open.
- 1 February - A planned fifth World Golf Championships tournament, the Tournament of Hope, was postponed indefinitely.
- 25 March – Tiger Woods took over the world number one ranking from Rory McIlroy by winning the Arnold Palmer Invitational.
- 14 July – Jordan Spieth, two weeks shy of his 20th birthday, won the John Deere Classic in a three-way playoff, becoming the first teenager to win on the PGA Tour since 1931.
- 13 September – Jim Furyk shot a 59 (12-under-par) in the second round of the BMW Championship at Conway Farms Golf Club in Lake Forest, Illinois, becoming just the sixth player to shoot 59 in a PGA Tour event.
- 8 December – Miguel Ángel Jiménez extended his own record as the oldest golfer ever to win a European Tour event, defending his title from last season in the Hong Kong Open at age 49 years, 337 days.

== Women's professional golf ==
LPGA majors

- 4–7 April: Kraft Nabisco Championship – South Korean Inbee Park won by four strokes with a score of 273 (–15). This was Park's second major victory; she won the 2008 U.S. Women's Open as a 19-year-old.
- 6–9 June: Wegmans LPGA Championship – South Korean Inbee Park defeated Catriona Matthew on the third hole of a sudden-death playoff for her second consecutive major championship triumph.
- 27–30 June: U.S. Women's Open - South Korean Inbee Park won her second U.S. Women's Open, gaining her third major win of the year, and also gaining the third consecutive win on the LPGA Tour. Park becomes the first woman to win the first three majors of a season since Babe Zaharias in 1950, and the first ever to do so in a season in which there were more than three majors.
- 1–4 August: Women's British Open – American Stacy Lewis won her first Women's British Open and her second major. Lewis became the first American woman to win a major since her victory in the 2011 Kraft Nabisco Championship. The win also gave Americans a clean sweep of the British Opens, to go along with Phil Mickelson winning the Open Championship, and Mark Wiebe winning the Senior Open Championship.
- 12–15 September: The Evian Championship – Norwegian Suzann Pettersen won; it was her second career major championship, her first being the 2007 LPGA Championship. This was the first year The Evian Championship was played as a major.

Additional LPGA Tour events

- 21–24 November: CME Group Titleholders – Shanshan Feng won by three strokes over Gerina Piller.

For a complete list of LPGA Tour results, see 2013 LPGA Tour. For a complete list of Ladies European Tour results see 2013 Ladies European Tour.

Team events

- 16–18 August: Solheim Cup – Europe retained the Solheim Cup, and it's the first time in the Cup history that Europe won on U.S. soil.

Money list leaders

- LPGA Tour – (South Korea) Inbee Park (US$2,456,619)
- LPGA of Japan Tour – Rikako Morita (¥126,675,049)
- Ladies European Tour – (Norway) Suzann Pettersen (€518,449)
- LPGA of Korea Tour – (South Korea) Jang Ha-na (₩689,542,549)
- Ladies Asian Golf Tour – (Thailand) Pornanong Phatlum (US$116,295)
- ALPG Tour – (Australia) Stacey Keating (A$74,625) (2012/13 season)
- Symetra Tour – (Thailand) P.K. Kongkraphan (US$43,848)

Awards

- LPGA Tour Player of the Year – (South Korea) Inbee Park
- LPGA Tour Rookie of the Year – (Thailand) Moriya Jutanugarn
- LPGA Tour Vare Trophy – (United States) Stacy Lewis
- LET Player of the Year – (South Africa) Lee-Anne Pace
- LET Rookie of the Year – (England) Charley Hull
- LPGA of Japan Tour Player of the Year – Sakura Yokomine

Other tour results

- 2013 Symetra Tour
- 2013 Ladies Asian Golf Tour
- 2013 LPGA of Japan Tour
- 2013 LPGA of Korea Tour

Other happenings

- 24 January – The LPGA announced plans to launch a new international team event in 2014, the International Crown. The event, intended to be held in even-numbered years (those in which the Solheim Cup is not held), would involve four-member teams from eight countries in a four-day match play format. The countries to play in the inaugural event would be the eight countries whose top four players are cumulatively highest-ranked in the Women's World Golf Rankings at the end of the 2013 LPGA season.
- 18 March – American Stacy Lewis took over the number one spot in the Women's World Golf Rankings following a victory at the RR Donnelley LPGA Founders Cup. Yani Tseng had held the top position for the previous 109 weeks.
- 15 April – South Korean Inbee Park took over the number one position in the Women's World Golf Rankings following an off-week on the LPGA Tour. It was the first time a South Korean player held the top spot since Jiyai Shin gave up the spot in February 2011.
- 21 November – The eight countries that will participate in the inaugural International Crown are announced. The four-player teams will consist of the top players from each of these countries in the Women's World Rankings immediately preceding the 2014 Kraft Nabisco Championship: Australia, Japan, South Korea, Spain, Sweden, Taiwan, Thailand, United States.

== Senior men's professional golf ==
Senior majors

- 23–26 May: Senior Players Championship – Kōki Idoki of Japan won, becoming the first Asian to win a senior major tournament.
- 6–9 June: Regions Tradition – David Frost of South Africa won his first senior major.
- 27–30 June: Senior PGA Championship – American Kenny Perry won his first senior major.
- 11–14 July: U.S. Senior Open – Kenny Perry won his second consecutive senior major.
- 25–28 July: The Senior Open Championship – American Mark Wiebe won his first senior major.

Full results

- 2013 Champions Tour
- 2013 European Senior Tour

Money list leaders

- Champions Tour – German Bernhard Langer topped the money list for the fifth time (second consecutive) with earnings of US$2,448,428.
- European Senior Tour – England's Paul Wesselingh topped the Order of Merit for the first time with earnings of €311,644.

Awards

- Champions Tour
  - Charles Schwab Cup – (United States) Kenny Perry
  - Player of the Year – (United States) Kenny Perry
  - Rookie of the Year – (United States) Rocco Mediate
  - Leading money winner (Arnold Palmer Award) – (Germany) Bernhard Langer
  - Lowest stroke average (Byron Nelson Award) – (United States) Fred Couples

== Amateur golf ==
- 21–24 May: NCAA Division I Women's Golf Championships – Southern California won its third team title and freshman Annie Park claimed the individual title
- 28 May – 2 June: NCAA Division I Men's Golf Championships – Alabama won its first team title, and senior Max Homa of the California Golden Bears won the individual title.
- 10–15 June: British Ladies Amateur Golf Championship - English teenager Georgia Hall won, defeating Spaniard Luna Sobrón in the final match by a score of 1 up.
- 17–22 June: The Amateur Championship – Garrick Porteous of England won, the first English winner in 10 years, and the United Kingdom's second consecutive winner.
- 5–11 August: U.S. Women's Amateur – Emma Talley of the USA won, defeating Taiwan's Yueer Cindy Feng in the final match by a score of 2 & 1.
- 12–18 August: U.S. Amateur – Matt Fitzpatrick of the UK won, defeating Australian Oliver Goss in the final match by a score of 4 & 3. Fitzpatrick became the first Englishman in 102 years to win it.
- 7–8 September: Walker Cup – The United States defeated Great Britain and Ireland by a score of 17 to 9.
- 24–27 October: Asia-Pacific Amateur Championship – Lee Chang-woo of South Korea won by three strokes.

Other happenings

- 11 February – The United States Golf Association announced that the U.S. Amateur Public Links and U.S. Women's Amateur Public Links will be discontinued after their 2014 editions. The tournaments will be replaced by four-ball championships for both men and women.

== World Golf Hall of Fame inductees ==
The 2013 class was announced starting in September 2012 with induction occurring on 6 May 2013:

- (United States) Fred Couples (PGA Tour)
- (United States) Ken Venturi (Lifetime Achievement)
- (Scotland) Willie Park, Jr. (Veterans)
- (Scotland) Colin Montgomerie (International)
- (Scotland) Ken Schofield (Lifetime Achievement)

It was announced in October that World Golf Hall of Fame is reviewing its selection process in all five categories and that there would be no induction ceremony in 2014.

== Deaths ==
- 3 January – Hisayuki Sasaki (born 1964), three-time Japan Golf Tour winner
- 8 January – Mike Brannan (born 1955), youngest U.S. Junior Amateur winner and PGA Tour golfer
- 16 February – Ernie Vossler (born 1928), three-time PGA Tour winner
- 10 April – Dick Hart (born 1935), PGA Tour winner
- 17 May – Ken Venturi (born 1931), 1964 U.S. Open winner, broadcaster
- 11 June – Miller Barber (born 1931), 35 wins on PGA Tour and Senior PGA Tour
- 21 June – Bernard Hunt (born 1930), two-time European Ryder Cup captain
- 23 June – Frank Stranahan (born 1922), two-time British Amateur winner and six-time PGA Tour winner
- 10 July – Ok-Hee Ku (born 1956), first South Korean to win on the LPGA Tour
- 27 August – Dave Thomas (born 1934), winner of sixteen professional tournaments and twice Open Championship runner-up.
- 30 August – William C. Campbell (born 1923), 1964 U.S. Amateur winner and two-time USGA president

== Table of results ==
This table summarizes all the results referred to above in date order.

Dates	Tournament	Status or tour	Winner
20–24 Feb	WGC-Accenture Match Play Championship	World Golf Championships	(United States) Matt Kuchar
7–10 Mar	WGC-Cadillac Championship	World Golf Championships	(United States) Tiger Woods
4–7 Apr	Kraft Nabisco Championship	LPGA major	(South Korea) Inbee Park
11–14 Apr	Masters Tournament	Men's major	(Australia) Adam Scott
9–12 May	The Players Championship	PGA Tour	(United States) Tiger Woods
21–24 May	NCAA Division I Women's Golf Championships	U.S. college championship	Southern California / Annie Park
23–26 May	BMW PGA Championship	European Tour	(Italy) Matteo Manassero
23–26 May	Senior PGA Championship	Senior major	(Japan) Kouki Idoki
28 May – 2 Jun	NCAA Division I Men's Golf Championships	U.S. college championship	Alabama / Max Homa
6–9 Jun	Wegmans LPGA Championship	LPGA major	(South Korea) Inbee Park
6–9 Jun	Regions Tradition	Senior major	(South Africa) David Frost
10–15 Jun	British Ladies Amateur	Amateur women's individual tournament	(England) Georgia Hall
13–16 Jun	U.S. Open	Men's major	(England) Justin Rose
17–22 Jun	The Amateur Championship	Amateur men's individual tournament	(England) Garrick Porteous
27–30 Jun	Constellation Senior Players Championship	Senior major	(United States) Kenny Perry
27–30 Jun	U.S. Women's Open	LPGA major	(South Korea) Inbee Park
11–14 Jul	U.S. Senior Open	Senior major	(United States) Kenny Perry
18–21 Jul	The Open Championship	Men's major	(United States) Phil Mickelson
25–28 Jul	The Senior Open Championship	Senior major	(United States) Mark Wiebe
1–4 Aug	WGC-Bridgestone Invitational	World Golf Championships	(United States) Tiger Woods
1–4 Aug	Ricoh Women's British Open	LPGA and Ladies European Tour major	(United States) Stacy Lewis
5–11 Aug	U.S. Women's Amateur	Amateur women's individual tournament	(United States) Emma Talley
8–11 Aug	PGA Championship	Men's major	(United States) Jason Dufner
12–18 Aug	U.S. Amateur	Amateur men's individual tournament	(England) Matt Fitzpatrick
16–18 Aug	Solheim Cup	Europe v United States women's professional team event	(European Union) Team Europe
22–25 Aug	The Barclays	PGA Tour FedEx Cup playoff	(Australia) Adam Scott
30 Aug – 2 Sep	Deutsche Bank Championship	PGA Tour FedEx Cup playoff	(Sweden) Henrik Stenson
7–8 Sep	Walker Cup	Great Britain & Ireland v United States men's amateur team event	United States
12–15 Sep	BMW Championship	PGA Tour FedEx Cup playoff	(United States) Zach Johnson
12–15 Sep	The Evian Championship	LPGA and Ladies European Tour major	(Norway) Suzann Pettersen
19–22 Sep	The Tour Championship	PGA Tour FedEx Cup playoff	(Sweden) Henrik Stenson
3–6 Oct	Presidents Cup	United States v. International team men's professional team event	(United States) U.S. team
3–6 Oct	Seve Trophy	Great Britain & Ireland v Continental Europe men's professional team event	Continental Europe
24–27 Oct	Asia-Pacific Amateur Championship	Amateur men's individual tournament	(South Korea) Lee Chang-woo
31 Oct – 3 Nov	WGC-HSBC Champions	World Golf Championships	(United States) Dustin Johnson
14–17 Nov	DP World Tour Championship, Dubai	European Tour	(Sweden) Henrik Stenson
21–24 Nov	CME Group Titleholders	LPGA Tour	(China) Shanshan Feng
21–24 Nov	World Cup of Golf	Men's professional national team event	Jason Day – individual Australia – team
20–22 Dec	Royal Trophy	Europe v Asia men's professional team event	Europe

The following biennial events will next be played in 2014: Ryder Cup, Curtis Cup, Eisenhower Trophy, Espirito Santo Trophy. The inaugural edition of the International Crown is also planned for 2014.
