= 2013 FedEx Cup Playoffs =

Tournament information
- Dates: August 22 – September 22, 2013
- Location: Liberty National Golf Club; TPC Boston; Conway Farms Golf Club; East Lake Golf Club
- Tour: PGA Tour

Statistics
- Field: 125 for The Barclays; 100 for Deutsche Bank; 70 for BMW Championship; 30 for Tour Championship
- Prize fund: $35,000,000 bonus money
- Winner's share: $10,000,000 bonus money

Champion
- (Sweden) Henrik Stenson
- 4,750 points

The 2013 FedEx Cup Playoffs, the series of four golf tournaments that determined the season champion on the U.S.-based PGA Tour, were played from August 22 to September 22. It included the following four events:

- The Barclays — Liberty National Golf Club, Jersey City, New Jersey
- Deutsche Bank Championship — TPC Boston, Norton, Massachusetts
- BMW Championship — Conway Farms Golf Club, Lake Forest, Illinois
- Tour Championship — East Lake Golf Club, Atlanta, Georgia

These were the seventh FedEx Cup playoffs since their inception in 2007.

The point distributions can be seen here.

== Regular season rankings ==
Place	Player	Points	Events
1	(United States) Tiger Woods	3,059	12
2	(United States) Matt Kuchar	2,293	19
3	(United States) Brandt Snedeker	2,218	19
4	(United States) Phil Mickelson	2,166	17
5	(United States) Bill Haas	1,505	21
6	(United States) Billy Horschel	1,487	22
7	(England) Justin Rose	1,447	13
8	(United States) Jordan Spieth	1,436	19
9	(Sweden) Henrik Stenson	1,426	14
10	(United States) Keegan Bradley	1,416	21

== The Barclays ==
The Barclays was played August 22–25. Of the 125 players eligible to play in the event, two did not enter: Zach Johnson (ranked 18) and Steve Stricker (20). Of the 123 entrants, 74 made the second-round cut at 142 (E).

Adam Scott won by one stroke over Graham DeLaet, Justin Rose, Gary Woodland, and Tiger Woods and moved from 11th place to second place in the standings. The top 100 players in the points standings advanced to the Deutsche Bank Championship. This included five players who were outside the top 100 prior to The Barclays: Martin Kaymer (ranked 103rd to 90th), Camilo Villegas (110 to 100), Erik Compton (117 to 94), Greg Chalmers (122 to 93), and Stuart Appleby (123 to 96). Five players started the tournament within the top 100 but ended the tournament outside the top 100, ending their playoff chances: James Driscoll (ranked 93rd to 103rd), Ted Potter Jr. (96 to 105), J. J. Henry (97 to 106), Geoff Ogilvy (99 to 104), and Jeff Overton (100 to 108).

					FedEx Cup rank	
Place	Player	Score	To par	Winnings ($)	After	Before
1	(Australia) Adam Scott	69-66-72-66=273	−11	1,440,000	2	11
T2	(Canada) Graham DeLaet	67-73-69-65=274	−10	528,000	7	34
T2	(England) Justin Rose	68-68-70-68=274	−10	528,000	5	7
T2	(United States) Gary Woodland	69-64-68-73=274	−10	528,000	10	60
T2	(United States) Tiger Woods	67-69-69-69=274	−10	528,000	1	1
T6	(United States) Jim Furyk	70-66-70-69=275	−9	268,000	14	23
T6	(United States) Phil Mickelson	71-69-70-65=275	−9	268,000	3	4
T6	(United States) D. A. Points	70-72-66-67=275	−9	268,000	15	25
T9	(United States) Matt Every	67-72-69-68=276	−8	208,000	46	88
T9	(United States) Rickie Fowler	71-64-71-70=276	−8	208,000	23	42
T9	(United States) Jason Kokrak	70-69-70-67=276	−8	208,000	50	95
T9	(United States) Nick Watney	68-70-69-69=276	−8	208,000	35	63

- Par 71 course

== Deutsche Bank Championship ==
The Deutsche Bank Championship was played August 30 – September 2. All 100 players eligible to play in the event did so. 76 made the second-round cut at one-under-par, 141.

Henrik Stenson won by two strokes over Steve Stricker and moved into first place in the standings. The top 70 players in the points standings advanced to the BMW Championship. This included seven players who were outside the top 70 prior to the Deutsche Bank Championship: Kevin Stadler (75 to 32), Brian Davis (80 to 49), Ian Poulter (77 to 52), Marc Leishman (76 to 58), Nicholas Thompson (73 to 59), Brendan Steele (89 to 69), and Ernie Els (91 to 70). Seven players started the tournament within the top 70 but ended the tournament outside the top 70, ending their playoff chances: Ryan Palmer (60 to 71), Freddie Jacobson (61 to 72), Martin Laird (63 to 74), David Lingmerth (64 to 75), Kyle Stanley (66 to 77), Cameron Tringale (69 to 79), and Tim Clark (70 to 80).

					FedEx Cup rank	
Place	Player	Score	To par	Winnings ($)	After	Before
1	(Sweden) Henrik Stenson	67-63-66-66=262	−22	1,440,000	1	13
2	(United States) Steve Stricker	66-68-63-67=264	−20	864,000	8	28
3	(Canada) Graham DeLaet	67-68-62-69=266	−18	544,000	5	7
T4	(Spain) Sergio García	65-64-65-73=267	−17	315,000	24	55
T4	(United States) Matt Kuchar	66-66-69-66=267	−17	315,000	4	4
T4	(United States) Jordan Spieth	67-66-72-62=267	−17	315,000	10	9
T4	(United States) Kevin Stadler	64-71-64-68=267	−17	315,000	32	75
8	(England) Brian Davis	63-72-66-67=268	−16	248,000	49	80
T9	(United States) Roberto Castro	65-65-68-71=269	−15	208,000	25	34
T9	(Zimbabwe) Brendon de Jonge	69-65-69-66=269	−15	208,000	26	38
T9	(United States) Jason Dufner	66-66-66-71=269	−15	208,000	13	19
T9	(England) Ian Poulter	66-68-66-69=269	−15	208,000	52	77

- Par 71 course

== BMW Championship ==
The BMW Championship was played September 12–16, after a one-week break. All 70 players eligible to play in the event did so. There was no cut. The tournament was scheduled to end on September 15 but the final round could not be completed on Sunday due to rain and finished on Monday.

Zach Johnson won by two strokes over Nick Watney. Two players played their way into the Tour Championship: Watney (ranked 34 to ranked 12) and Luke Donald (54 to 29). Two players played their way out of the Tour Championship: Harris English (28 to 31) and Lee Westwood (30 to 41).

The top 30 players in FedEx Cup points after this event advanced to the Tour Championship and also earned spots in the 2014 Masters Tournament, U.S. Open, and (British) Open Championship.

With the FedEx Cup points reset after the BMW Championship, all 30 remaining players had at least a mathematical chance to secure the season crown, and any of the top five players could claim the FedEx Cup with a win in the Tour Championship.

					FedEx Cup rank	
Place	Player	Score	To par	Winnings ($)	After	Before
1	(United States) Zach Johnson	64-70-69-65=268	−16	1,440,000	4	27
2	(United States) Nick Watney	67-69-70-64=270	−14	864,000	12	34
3	(United States) Jim Furyk	72-59-69-71=271	−13	544,000	11	15
T4	(Australia) Jason Day	71-66-70-66=273	−11	315,000	14	12
T4	(England) Luke Donald	70-70-67-66=273	−11	315,000	29	54
T4	(United States) Hunter Mahan	68-73-65-67=273	−11	315,000	15	18
T4	(United States) Steve Stricker	66-71-64-72=273	−11	315,000	6	8
T8	(Australia) Matt Jones	69-71-67-67=274	−10	232,000	32	51
T8	(South Africa) Charl Schwartzel	66-70-69-69=274	−10	232,000	23	29
T8	(United States) Brandt Snedeker	63-68-71-72=274	−10	232,000	10	9

- Par 71 course

== Reset points ==
The points were reset after the BMW Championship.

Place	Player	Points	Reset points	Events
1	(United States) Tiger Woods	4,352	2,500	15
2	(Sweden) Henrik Stenson	4,229	2,250	17
3	(Australia) Adam Scott	4,122	2,000	15
4	(United States) Zach Johnson	3,843	1,800	23
5	(United States) Matt Kuchar	3,330	1,600	22
6	(United States) Steve Stricker	3,180	1,400	12
7	(Canada) Graham DeLaet	3,011	1,200	25
8	(United States) Phil Mickelson	2,939	1,000	20
9	(England) Justin Rose	2,842	800	16
10	(United States) Brandt Snedeker	2,726	600	22

== Tour Championship ==
The Tour Championship was played September 19–22. All 30 golfers who qualified for the tournament played, and there was no cut. Henrik Stenson won the tournament by three shots over Jordan Spieth and Steve Stricker, and the FedEx Cup.

					FedEx Cup rank	
Place	Player	Score	To par	Winnings ($)	After	Before
1	(Sweden) Henrik Stenson	64-66-69-68=267	−13	1,440,000	1	2
T2	(United States) Jordan Spieth	68-67-71-64=270	−10	708,000	7	13
T2	(United States) Steve Stricker	66-71-68-65=270	−10	708,000	3	6
4	(United States) Webb Simpson	68-71-69-63=271	−9	384,000	11	21
5	(United States) Dustin Johnson	68-68-67-69=272	−8	320,000	13	30
6	(England) Justin Rose	68-68-70-67=273	−7	288,000	10	9
T7	(United States) Billy Horschel	66-70-70-68=274	−6	264,000	16	22
T7	(United States) Zach Johnson	69-68-69-68=274	−6	264,000	5	4
T9	(United States) Roberto Castro	67-71-72-65=275	−5	227,733	21	24
T9	(United States) Jason Dufner	74-70-66-65=275	−5	227,733	19	20
T9	(Spain) Sergio García	68-71-69-67=275	−5	227,733	22	25

- Par 70 course

== Final leaderboard ==
Place	Player	Points	Winnings ($)
1	(Sweden) Henrik Stenson	4,750	10,000,000
2	(United States) Tiger Woods	2,743	3,000,000
3	(United States) Steve Stricker	2,650	2,000,000
4	(Australia) Adam Scott	2,278	1,500,000
5	(United States) Zach Johnson	2,238	1,000,000
6	(United States) Matt Kuchar	1,823	800,000
7	(United States) Jordan Spieth	1,690	700,000
8	(Canada) Graham DeLaet	1,415	600,000
9	(United States) Phil Mickelson	1,313	550,000
10	(England) Justin Rose	1,300	500,000

For the full list see here.

== Table of qualifying players ==
Table key:

Win
Top-10 finish
Did not advance to next tournament
Played way into next tournament

	Player	Pre-Playoffs		The Barclays		Deutsche Bank		BMW Champ.		Reset points	Tour Champ.	
	Player	Points	Rank	Finish	Rank after	Finish	Rank after	Finish	Rank after	Reset points	Finish	Final rank
(United States)	Tiger Woods	3,059	1	T2	1	T65	2	T11	1	2,500	T22	2
(United States)	Matt Kuchar	2,293	2	T19	4	T4	4	T24	5	1,600	T26	6
(United States)	Brandt Snedeker	2,218	3	CUT	6	T47	9	T8	10	600	T20	12
(United States)	Phil Mickelson	2,166	4	T6	3	T41	6	T33	8	1,000	T12	9
(United States)	Bill Haas	1,505	5	T25	8	CUT	17	T28	18	340	T24	24
(United States)	Billy Horschel*	1,487	6	CUT	17	T70	22	T18	22	290	T7	16
(England)	Justin Rose	1,447	7	T2	5	T16	7	T33	9	800	6	10
(United States)	Jordan Spieth*	1,436	8	T19	9	T4	10	T16	13	440	T2	7
(Sweden)	Henrik Stenson	1,426	9	T43	13	1	1	T33	2	2,250	1	1
(United States)	Keegan Bradley	1,416	10	T33	11	T16	11	T16	16	380	T12	18
(Australia)	Adam Scott	1,347	11	1	2	T53	3	T28	3	2,000	T14	4
(United States)	Boo Weekley	1,335	12	T58	20	T35	19	T54	26	250	30	29
(United States)	Kevin Streelman	1,333	13	T19	12	T41	16	T33	19	320	T24	25
(Australia)	Jason Day	1,284	14	T25	16	T13	12	T4	14	420	T14	17
(United States)	Jason Dufner	1,256	15	T37	19	T9	13	T54	20	310	T9	19
(United States)	Dustin Johnson	1,226	16	CUT	22	T27	23	T62	30	210	5	13
(United States)	Webb Simpson	1,188	17	T15	18	T53	20	T24	21	300	4	11
(United States)	Zach Johnson	1,141	18	DNP	25	T27	27	1	4	1,800	T7	5
(United States)	Harris English	1,134	19	CUT	26	T27	28	50	31	–	–	31
(United States)	Steve Stricker	1,117	20	DNP	28	2	8	T4	6	1,400	T2	3
(United States)	Hunter Mahan	1,101	21	T25	21	T13	18	T4	15	400	T20	20
(United States)	Patrick Reed*	1,062	22	CUT	32	T70	47	T59	54	–	–	54
(United States)	Jim Furyk	1,057	23	T6	14	T27	15	3	11	480	T14	14
(United States)	Russell Henley*	1,048	24	CUT	33	T62	43	T39	44	–	–	44
(United States)	D. A. Points	1,038	25	T6	15	CUT	21	T57	28	230	T26	30
(United States)	Jimmy Walker	996	26	T54	30	CUT	45	T11	36	–	–	36
(United States)	Charles Howell III	996	27	T33	24	T53	31	T39	35	–	–	35
(Northern Ireland)	Graeme McDowell	941	28	CUT	44	T47	48	T57	55	–	–	55
(Sweden)	Jonas Blixt	912	29	T58	41	T53	50	T51	52	–	–	52
(United States)	John Merrick	909	30	T50	39	T53	44	T18	39	–	–	39
(United States)	Chris Kirk	904	31	CUT	47	T16	37	T24	34	–	–	34
(United States)	Ken Duke	902	32	CUT	48	CUT	61	T65	67	–	–	67
(South Africa)	Charl Schwartzel	871	33	T25	29	T22	29	T8	23	280	29	27
(Canada)	Graham DeLaet	856	34	T2	7	3	5	T28	7	1,200	28	8
(England)	Lee Westwood	856	35	T25	31	T27	30	67	41	–	–	41
(South Korea)	Bae Sang-moon	838	36	CUT	57	CUT	67	T54	69	–	–	69
(Australia)	Matt Jones	836	37	T33	37	CUT	51	T8	32	–	–	32
(United States)	Bubba Watson	830	38	T13	27	T67	40	T24	37	–	–	37
(United States)	Michael Thompson	828	39	CUT	58	T53	63	T62	66	–	–	66
(Argentina)	Ángel Cabrera	826	40	CUT	59	76	68	T44	65	–	–	65
(United States)	Roberto Castro	823	41	T25	34	T9	25	15	24	270	T9	21
(United States)	Rickie Fowler	822	42	T9	23	CUT	36	T39	38	–	–	38
(United States)	Scott Stallings	816	43	CUT	62	T35	55	T69	63	–	–	63
(Scotland)	Martin Laird	809	44	T72	63	CUT	74	–	–	–	–	74
(Sweden)	David Lingmerth*	806	45	WD	64	CUT	75	–	–	–	–	75
(United States)	Ryan Palmer	801	46	T66	60	CUT	71	–	–	–	–	71
(United States)	Chris Stroud	800	47	T33	40	T35	39	T51	43	–	–	43
(United States)	Charley Hoffman	793	48	70	65	T27	53	68	61	–	–	61
(Northern Ireland)	Rory McIlroy	777	49	T19	36	T47	41	T59	50	–	–	50
(United States)	Scott Piercy	773	50	T43	49	T13	35	T69	49	–	–	49
(Zimbabwe)	Brendon de Jonge	769	51	T19	38	T9	26	T18	27	240	T18	26
(United States)	Brian Gay	744	52	T43	51	T27	46	T65	57	–	–	57
(Canada)	David Hearn	728	53	T72	67	T35	62	T28	56	–	–	56
(England)	David Lynn*	716	54	T19	42	CUT	56	23	48	–	–	48
(England)	Luke Donald	707	55	T41	54	T41	54	T4	29	220	T18	28
(South Africa)	Tim Clark	703	56	CUT	70	CUT	80	–	–	–	–	80
(United States)	John Rollins	696	57	CUT	71	CUT	81	–	–	–	–	81
(United States)	Kevin Chappell	689	58	T15	43	T22	33	T62	45	–	–	45
(Spain)	Sergio García	684	59	T37	55	T4	24	T18	25	260	T9	22
(United States)	Gary Woodland	683	60	T2	10	T41	14	T18	17	360	T22	23
(United States)	Josh Teater	682	61	T72	72	T62	78	–	–	–	–	78
(South Korea)	K. J. Choi	666	62	T68	74	T41	73	–	–	–	–	73
(United States)	Nick Watney	663	63	T9	35	T35	34	2	12	460	T14	15
(United States)	Kyle Stanley	662	64	T50	66	CUT	77	–	–	–	–	77
(United States)	John Huh	661	65	T15	45	T22	38	49	42	–	–	42
(Sweden)	Freddie Jacobson	659	66	T37	61	CUT	72	–	–	–	–	72
(United States)	Cameron Tringale	654	67	T58	69	T67	79	–	–	–	–	79
(United States)	Ryan Moore	653	68	T25	53	75	65	T11	51	–	–	51
(Australia)	Marc Leishman	648	69	71	76	T16	58	T39	59	–	–	59
(England)	Ian Poulter	645	70	CUT	77	T9	52	T44	53	–	–	53
(England)	Brian Davis	622	71	CUT	80	8	49	T33	47	–	–	47
(United States)	Luke Guthrie*	607	72	CUT	81	CUT	90	–	–	–	–	90
(United States)	Robert Garrigus	601	73	CUT	82	CUT	91	–	–	–	–	91
(United States)	Derek Ernst*	598	74	CUT	83	CUT	93	–	–	–	–	93
(United States)	Daniel Summerhays	594	75	T15	52	T22	42	T28	40	–	–	40
(United States)	Scott Brown*	588	76	T62	79	CUT	88	–	–	–	–	88
(United States)	Nicholas Thompson	585	77	T50	73	T22	59	T44	60	–	–	60
(United States)	Brian Stuard*	583	78	CUT	84	T67	92	–	–	–	–	92
(United States)	Jerry Kelly	580	79	CUT	87	T53	85	–	–	–	–	85
(United States)	Brian Harman	578	80	CUT	88	CUT	94	–	–	–	–	94
(United States)	Brendan Steele	574	81	CUT	89	T20	69	61	70	–	–	70
(South Africa)	Ernie Els	571	82	CUT	91	T20	70	T51	68	–	–	68
(United States)	Stewart Cink	568	83	T68	85	T27	76	–	–	–	–	76
(United States)	Richard H. Lee*	565	84	CUT	92	T73	96	–	–	–	–	96
(South Africa)	Rory Sabbatini	553	85	T13	56	T53	60	T11	46	–	–	46
(United States)	Martin Flores	552	86	T54	78	CUT	87	–	–	–	–	87
(United States)	Kevin Stadler	547	87	T43	75	T4	32	T33	33	–	–	33
(United States)	Matt Every	545	88	T9	46	T62	57	T39	58	–	–	58
(United States)	Pat Perez	544	89	CUT	95	T70	98	–	–	–	–	98
(United States)	Bo Van Pelt	542	90	CUT	97	T53	89	–	–	–	–	89
(United States)	Justin Leonard	536	91	CUT	98	T47	86	–	–	–	–	86
(United States)	William McGirt	533	92	CUT	99	CUT	100	–	–	–	–	100
(United States)	James Driscoll	524	93	CUT	103	–	–	–	–	–	–	103
(United States)	Bob Estes	523	94	T58	86	T47	83	–	–	–	–	83
(United States)	Jason Kokrak*	521	95	T9	50	T73	64	T44	62	–	–	62
(United States)	Ted Potter Jr.	518	96	CUT	105	–	–	–	–	–	–	105
(United States)	J. J. Henry	516	97	CUT	106	–	–	–	–	–	–	106
(United States)	Bryce Molder	504	98	T25	68	T41	66	T44	64	–	–	64
(Australia)	Geoff Ogilvy	492	99	65	104	–	–	–	–	–	–	104
(United States)	Jeff Overton	484	100	T66	108	–	–	–	–	–	–	108
(United States)	James Hahn*	480	101	CUT	110	–	–	–	–	–	–	110
(United States)	Mark Wilson	476	102	CUT	111	–	–	–	–	–	–	111
(Germany)	Martin Kaymer*	474	103	T50	90	T47	84	–	–	–	–	84
(United States)	Charlie Beljan*	459	104	CUT	112	–	–	–	–	–	–	112
(Australia)	John Senden	458	105	T62	109	–	–	–	–	–	–	109
(United States)	Jason Bohn	454	106	CUT	113	–	–	–	–	–	–	113
(United States)	Lucas Glover	454	107	WD	114	–	–	–	–	–	–	114
(United States)	Jeff Maggert	453	108	CUT	115	–	–	–	–	–	–	115
(United States)	Justin Hicks*	451	109	WD	116	–	–	–	–	–	–	116
(Colombia)	Camilo Villegas	450	110	T54	100	T35	82	–	–	–	–	82
(United States)	Morgan Hoffmann*	444	111	CUT	117	–	–	–	–	–	–	117
(United States)	Chez Reavie	439	112	CUT	118	–	–	–	–	–	–	118
(Sweden)	Carl Pettersson	439	113	T54	107	–	–	–	–	–	–	107
(South Korea)	Lee Dong-hwan*	432	114	CUT	119	–	–	–	–	–	–	119
(Argentina)	Andrés Romero	430	115	CUT	120	–	–	–	–	–	–	120
(United States)	Johnson Wagner	430	116	CUT	121	–	–	–	–	–	–	121
(United States)	Erik Compton*	422	117	T43	94	CUT	99	–	–	–	–	99
(South Korea)	Charlie Wi	401	118	CUT	123	–	–	–	–	–	–	123
(Australia)	Aaron Baddeley	401	119	T43	101	–	–	–	–	–	–	101
(Australia)	Steven Bowditch	400	120	CUT	124	–	–	–	–	–	–	124
(United States)	George McNeill	399	121	T43	102	–	–	–	–	–	–	102
(Australia)	Greg Chalmers	395	122	T37	93	CUT	97	–	–	–	–	97
(Australia)	Stuart Appleby	395	123	T41	96	T65	95	–	–	–	–	95
(United States)	Scott Langley*	386	124	T62	122	–	–	–	–	–	–	122
(United States)	Ben Crane	369	125	WD	125	–	–	–	–	–	–	125

* First-time Playoffs participant
