= 2013 European Tour =

Golf tour season

2013 European Tour season
- Duration: 6 December 2012 – 17 November 2013
- Number of official events: 45
- Most wins: (Netherlands) Joost Luiten (2) (Note: Phil Mickelson and Tiger Woods also won two events, but were not European Tour members.) (Northern Ireland) Graeme McDowell (2) (Australia) Brett Rumford (2)
- Race to Dubai: (Sweden) Henrik Stenson
- Golfer of the Year: (Sweden) Henrik Stenson
- Players' Player of the Year: (Sweden) Henrik Stenson
- Sir Henry Cotton Rookie of the Year: (United States) Peter Uihlein
- Graduate of the Year: (South Africa) Justin Walters

The 2013 European Tour was the 42nd season of the European Tour, the main professional golf tour in Europe since its inaugural season in 1972.

== Changes for 2013 ==
New for 2013 was the "Final Series", consisting of the final four tournaments of the season: BMW Masters, WGC-HSBC Champions, Turkish Airlines Open, and DP World Tour Championship, Dubai; with a requirement to play in two of the first three in order to compete in the DP World Tour Championship, Dubai. In addition, participation in the first three events accrued a 20% bonus in the Race to Dubai standings for those events.

There were several changes from the 2012 season. Additions for 2013 were the season opening Nelson Mandela Championship, the Tshwane Open, the returning Russian Open and the Turkish Airlines Open. Dropped from the schedule were the Sicilian Open and the Barclays Singapore Open; the UBS Hong Kong Open and the South African Open were also missing from the 2013 schedule as they were played in late in the year as part of the 2014 season.

=== Rule changes ===
In a change to the European Tour's membership criteria, from 2013 the Ryder Cup, Presidents Cup and Seve Trophy were included in the 13-event minimum requirement. The move was seen as an attempt to retain leading European players based in the United States on the PGA Tour, and attract top Americans to join the tour.

== Schedule ==
The following table lists official events during the 2013 season.

Date	Tournament	Host country	Purse	Winner (Note: The number in brackets after each winner's name is the number of European Tour events they had won up to and including that tournament. This information is only shown for European Tour members and are inclusive of the three United States-based major championships which were included on the schedule for the first time in 1998, with earlier editions having retrospectively been recognised as official tour wins.)	OWGR points	Other tours (Note: AFR − Sunshine Tour; ANZ − PGA Tour of Australasia; ASA − Asian Tour; CHA − Challenge Tour; KOR − Korean Tour; ONE − OneAsia Tour.)	Notes
9 Dec	Nelson Mandela Championship	South Africa	€1,000,000	(Scotland) Scott Jamieson (1)	20	AFR	New tournament
16 Dec	Alfred Dunhill Championship	South Africa	€1,500,000	(South Africa) Charl Schwartzel (8)	28	AFR	
13 Jan	Volvo Golf Champions	South Africa	€2,000,000	(South Africa) Louis Oosthuizen (6)	38		Limited-field event
20 Jan	Abu Dhabi HSBC Golf Championship	UAE	US$2,700,000	(Wales) Jamie Donaldson (2)	54		
26 Jan	Commercial Bank Qatar Masters	Qatar	US$2,500,000	(England) Chris Wood (1)	48		
3 Feb	Omega Dubai Desert Classic	UAE	US$2,500,000	(Scotland) Stephen Gallacher (2)	36		
10 Feb	Joburg Open	South Africa	€1,300,000	(South Africa) Richard Sterne (6)	22	AFR	
17 Feb	Africa Open	South Africa	€1,000,000	(South Africa) Darren Fichardt (4)	20	AFR	
24 Feb	WGC-Accenture Match Play Championship	United States	US$8,750,000	(United States) Matt Kuchar (n/a)	74		World Golf Championship
3 Mar	Tshwane Open	South Africa	€1,500,000	(South Africa) Dawie van der Walt (1)	20	AFR	New tournament
10 Mar	WGC-Cadillac Championship	United States	US$8,750,000	(United States) Tiger Woods (n/a)	74		World Golf Championship
17 Mar	Avantha Masters	India	€1,800,000	(South Africa) Thomas Aiken (2)	20	ASA	
24 Mar	Maybank Malaysian Open	Malaysia	US$2,750,000	(Thailand) Kiradech Aphibarnrat (1)	38	ASA	
31 Mar	Trophée Hassan II	Morocco	€1,500,000	(Germany) Marcel Siem (3)	24		
14 Apr	Masters Tournament	United States	US$8,000,000	(Australia) Adam Scott (9)	100		Major championship
21 Apr	Open de España	Spain	€1,500,000	(France) Raphaël Jacquelin (4)	24		
28 Apr	Ballantine's Championship	South Korea	€2,205,000	(Australia) Brett Rumford (4)	34	ASA, KOR	
5 May	Volvo China Open	China	CN¥20,000,000	(Australia) Brett Rumford (5)	28	ONE	
19 May	Volvo World Match Play Championship	Bulgaria	€3,000,000	(Northern Ireland) Graeme McDowell (8)	32		Limited-field event
19 May	Madeira Islands Open - Portugal - BPI	Portugal	€600,000	(United States) Peter Uihlein (1)	18	CHA	
26 May	BMW PGA Championship	England	€4,750,000	(Italy) Matteo Manassero (4)	64		Flagship event
2 Jun	Nordea Masters	Sweden	€1,500,000	(Finland) Mikko Ilonen (3)	28		
9 Jun	Lyoness Open	Austria	€1,000,000	(Netherlands) Joost Luiten (2)	24		
16 Jun	Najeti Hotels et Golfs Open	France	€500,000	(Republic of Ireland) Simon Thornton (1)	18	CHA	
16 Jun	U.S. Open	United States	US$8,000,000	(England) Justin Rose (6)	100		Major championship
23 Jun	BMW International Open	Germany	€2,000,000	(South Africa) Ernie Els (28)	32		
30 Jun	Irish Open	Ireland	€2,000,000	(England) Paul Casey (12)	32		
7 Jul	Alstom Open de France	France	€3,000,000	(Northern Ireland) Graeme McDowell (9)	44		
14 Jul	Aberdeen Asset Management Scottish Open	Scotland	£3,000,000	(United States) Phil Mickelson (n/a)	42		
21 Jul	The Open Championship	Scotland	£5,250,000	(United States) Phil Mickelson (n/a)	100		Major championship
28 Jul	M2M Russian Open	Russia	€1,000,000	(Northern Ireland) Michael Hoey (5)	24		
4 Aug	WGC-Bridgestone Invitational	United States	US$8,750,000	(United States) Tiger Woods (n/a)	76		World Golf Championship
11 Aug	PGA Championship	United States	US$8,000,000	(United States) Jason Dufner (n/a)	100		Major championship
25 Aug	Johnnie Walker Championship at Gleneagles	Scotland	£1,400,000	(England) Tommy Fleetwood (1)	24		
1 Sep	ISPS Handa Wales Open	Wales	£1,800,000	(France) Grégory Bourdy (4)	24		
8 Sep	Omega European Masters	Switzerland	€2,200,000	(Denmark) Thomas Bjørn (14)	30	ASA	
15 Sep	KLM Open	Netherlands	€1,800,000	(Netherlands) Joost Luiten (3)	24		
22 Sep	Open d'Italia Lindt	Italy	€1,500,000	(France) Julien Quesne (2)	24		
29 Sep	Alfred Dunhill Links Championship	Scotland	US$5,000,000	(England) David Howell (5)	36		Pro-Am
13 Oct	Portugal Masters	Portugal	€2,000,000	(England) David Lynn (2)	32		
20 Oct	ISPS Handa Perth International	Australia	US$2,000,000	(South Korea) Jin Jeong (1)	20	ANZ	
27 Oct	BMW Masters	China	US$7,000,000	(Spain) Gonzalo Fernández-Castaño (7)	50		Race to Dubai finals series
3 Nov	WGC-HSBC Champions	China	US$8,500,000	(United States) Dustin Johnson (n/a)	66		World Golf Championship; Race to Dubai finals series
10 Nov	Turkish Airlines Open	Turkey	US$7,500,000	(France) Victor Dubuisson (1)	52		New tournament Race to Dubai finals series
17 Nov	DP World Tour Championship, Dubai	UAE	US$8,000,000	(Sweden) Henrik Stenson (8)	54		Race to Dubai finals series

=== Unofficial events ===
The following events were sanctioned by the European Tour, but did not carry official money, nor were wins official.

Date	Tournament	Host country	Purse	Winner(s)	OWGR points	Notes
6 Oct	Seve Trophy	France	€1,750,000	Team Continental Europe	n/a	Team event
24 Nov	ISPS Handa World Cup of Golf	Australia	US$1,000,000	(Australia) Jason Day and (Australia) Adam Scott	n/a	Team event
24 Nov	World Cup of Golf Individual Trophy	Australia	US$7,000,000	(Australia) Jason Day	40	

== Location of tournaments ==
Location of official tournaments of the 2013 European Tour in Europe.
Major Championship
Flagship event
Final Series event
Regular event
Location of official tournaments of the 2013 European Tour outside Europe.
Major Championship
World Golf Championship
Final Series event
Regular event

South Africa
United Arab Emirates

== Race to Dubai ==
The Race to Dubai was based on tournament results during the season, calculated using a points-based system.

Pos.	Player	Majors				WGCs				Flagship event and R2D finals series (Note: The WGC-HSBC Champions was also a Race to Dubai finals series event.)				Top 10s in other ET events						Tmts	Points and money			
Pos.	Player	Mas	USO	Opn	PGA	WGC MP	WGC Cad	WGC Inv	WGC Cha	BMW PGA	BMW Mas	Tur	DPW TC	1	2	3	4	5	6	Tmts	Reg. points	FS bonus ($)	Bon. ($)	Total points
1	(Sweden) Stenson	T18	T21	2nd	3rd	T33	•	T2	T31	•	T34	T7	1st							17	3,321,298	43,372	1,000,000	4,103,796
2	(England) Poulter	CUT	T21	T3	T61	4th	T28	T19	2nd	CUT	T15	T5	2nd							14	2,515,369	176,929	650,000	2,969,469
3	(England) Rose	T25	1st	CUT	T33	T17	T8	T17	5th	T50	•	T3	T10	T2						13	2,295,813	–	500,000	2,776,244
4	(Northern Ireland) McDowell	CUT	CUT	T58	T12	T5	T3	T40	3rd	CUT	T53	•	T17	1st	1st					14	2,143,134	–	375,000	2,512,696
5	(Wales) Donaldson	CUT	T32	T32	WD	T33	T63	T17	T8	T37	T34	2nd	T8	1st	T6	T6				23	1,796,974	143,924	325,000	2,181,113
6	(France) Dubuisson	•	•	•	•	•	•	•	•	CUT	T44	1st	3rd	T9	T9	T9	T4	3rd	3rd	21	1,828,415	–	275,000	1,920,805
7	(Spain) F'dez-Castaño	T20	T10	T54	CUT	T9	T43	T38	T39	T62	1st	•	T37	T9	T9	T8				22	1,600,853	–	225,000	1,804,112
8	(South Africa) Sterne	T25	•	T21	CUT	T17	T12	T9	T39	T57	T31	T36	T14	T7	2nd	1st	T9	2nd		22	1,533,902	23,765	175,000	1,687,014
9	(Thailand) Jaidee	•	CUT	T32	T47	T33	•	•	T46	T40	T2	T29	T47	3rd	T9	T9	T6	2nd	T9	25	1,388,018	105,112	125,000	1,659,433
10	(Denmark) Bjørn	T46	•	T73	CUT	T33	•	•	T39	T40	T5	T18	T21	T9	T8	2nd	2nd	T8	1st	26	1,415,529	57,295	100,000	1,546,735

Win
Top 10
Made cut
Missed cut
Withdrew
• Did not play

== Awards ==
Award	Winner	Ref.
Golfer of the Year	(Sweden) Henrik Stenson	
Players' Player of the Year	(Sweden) Henrik Stenson	
Sir Henry Cotton Rookie of the Year	(United States) Peter Uihlein	
Graduate of the Year	(South Africa) Justin Walters	

== See also ==
- 2013 in golf
- 2013 Challenge Tour
- 2013 European Senior Tour
