= Erik Compton =

Norwegian-American professional golfer (born 1979)

Personal information
- Full name: Erik Harald Høie Compton
- Nationality: United States
- Born: November 11, 1979 (age 46) Miami, Florida, U.S.
- Height: 5 ft 8 in (1.73 m)
- Weight: 150 lb (68 kg; 11 st)
- Spouses: Barbara Casco (m. 2008; div. 2017) Yessenia Gonzalez
- Children: 1

Career
- Sport: Golf
- College: University of Georgia
- Turned professional: 2001
- Current tour: Korn Ferry Tour
- Former tours: PGA Tour; Canadian Tour; NGA Hooters Tour
- Professional wins: 6
- Highest ranking: 71 (July 6, 2014)

Number of wins by tour
- Korn Ferry Tour: 1
- Other: 5

Best results in major championships
- Masters Tournament: 51st: 2015
- PGA Championship: CUT: 2014
- U.S. Open: T2: 2014
- The Open Championship: CUT: 2014

Achievements and awards
- Canadian Tour Order of Merit winner: 2004
- PGA Tour Courage Award: 2013

Erik Harald Høie Compton (born November 11, 1979) is a Norwegian-American professional golfer.

== Early life ==
Compton was born in Miami, Florida, to an American father and a Norwegian mother and holds dual citizenship. When he was nine, Compton was diagnosed with viral cardiomyopathy, a condition where the heart muscle is inflamed and unable to pump as hard as it should. This condition has resulted in him undergoing two successful heart transplants, the first being in 1992 when Compton was 12, and the second taking place in 2008.

== Amateur career ==
Compton attended the University of Georgia and played on the 2001 Palmer Cup and Walker Cup teams. He has had two heart transplants. In 2001, he graduated from the University of Georgia.

== Professional career ==
In 2001, Compton turned professional. He played on the Nationwide Tour in 2002 and again from 2005 to 2007. His best finish was a T2 at the 2004 Preferred Health Systems Wichita Open.

Compton played on the Canadian Tour in 2003 and 2004. In 2004, he dominated the Canadian Tour, winning twice and also winning the Order of Merit title. He also won the 2004 Hassan II Golf Trophy in Morocco.

In 2009, Compton received the Ben Hogan Award, which is given annually to a golfer who has stayed active in golf despite a physical handicap or serious illness. He also gained recognition for his attempts to be allowed the use of a golf cart during qualifying rounds for PGA Tour and Nationwide Tour events.

Compton has also played the mini-tours, winning a few events on the NGA Hooters Tour. He played in thirty PGA Tour events as a non-member from 2000 to 2011 through sponsor exemptions and qualifying, making the cut 18 times. His best PGA Tour finish as a non-member was T25 in the 2011 Northern Trust Open. In 2010, Compton advanced to the Tour's final round of qualifying school. He finished tied for 100th, which granted him conditional Nationwide Tour status. In 2011, Compton won the Mexico Open, his first win on a major golf tour. Compton finished 13th on the money list, good enough for a PGA Tour Card for 2012.

In 2012, Compton made 16 of 26 cuts on the PGA Tour. His best finish was T-13 at the John Deere Classic. He finished 163rd on the money list, failing to retain his tour card. He returned to qualifying school and finished T-7 to regain his card for 2013. In 2013, he recorded his first top-10 finish by placing T-4 at The Honda Classic in March. He qualified for the FedEx Cup playoffs and finished the 2013 points in 99th place to retain his card and full playing rights.

In 2014 Compton had his best season on tour, recording three top-10s, qualifying for the playoffs and finishing 64th in FedEx Cup points. Also, that season, he recorded his best PGA Tour finish to date, when he tied for 2nd at the 2014 U.S. Open, which also earned him his first invitation to the Masters Tournament and the 2015 U.S. Open.

During the 2015 season Compton recorded one top-10 and finished the season 124th in FedEx Cup points, which was good enough to keep his card for 2016. In 2016, Compton missed many cuts and was even disqualified from the John Deere Classic for missing the Wednesday Pro-Am. As a result, he finished the season in 173rd and lost his tour card. He has played primarily on the Korn Ferry Tour since.

== Awards and honors ==
In 2009, Compton received the Ben Hogan Award

== Amateur wins ==
- 2001 Monroe Invitational

== Professional wins (6) ==
=== Korn Ferry Tour wins (1) ===
No.	Date	Tournament	Winning score	Margin of victory	Runner-up
1	Jun 26, 2011	Mexico Open	−17 (68-70-68-65=271)	2 strokes	(United States) Richard H. Lee

Korn Ferry Tour playoff record (0–2)

No.	Year	Tournament	Opponents	Result
1	2004	Preferred Health Systems Wichita Open	(United States) Hunter Haas, (United States) Scott Harrington, (Australia) Bradley Hughes	Hughes won with birdie on first extra hole
2	2019	Wichita Open	(United States) Bryan Bigley, (Denmark) Sebastian Cappelen, (United States) Kevin Dougherty, (Sweden) Henrik Norlander	Norlander won with par on third extra hole Cappelen, Compton and Dougherty eliminated by birdie on first hole

=== Canadian Tour wins (3) ===
No.	Date	Tournament	Winning score	Margin of victory	Runner(s)-up
1	May 11, 2003	Michelin Guadalajara Classic	−14 (67-71-69-63=270)	4 strokes	(Canada) David Hearn, (Mexico) Antonio Maldonado
2	Apr 25, 2004	E-Loan Central Valley Classic	−15 (69-65-71-68=273)	3 strokes	(New Zealand) Ben Gallie
3	Jul 11, 2004	MTS Classic	−17 (66-68-64-69=267)	1 stroke	(Canada) David Hearn

=== NGA Hooters Tour wins (1) ===
No.	Date	Tournament	Winning score	Margin of victory	Runner-up
1	Mar 28, 2004	Landings/NGA Pro Classic	−14 (67-69-71-67=274)	4 strokes	(Australia) Andrew Tschudin

=== Other wins (1) ===
No.	Date	Tournament	Winning score	Margin of victory	Runner-up
1	Feb 27, 2005	Hassan II Golf Trophy	−15 (71-69-69-68=277)	5 strokes	(Portugal) José-Filipe Lima

== Results in major championships ==
Tournament	2010	2011	2012	2013	2014	2015
Masters Tournament						51
U.S. Open	CUT				T2	CUT
The Open Championship					CUT	
PGA Championship					CUT	

Top 10
Did not play

CUT = missed the half-way cut
"T" = tied

=== Summary ===
Tournament	Wins	2nd	3rd	Top-5	Top-10	Top-25	Events	Cuts made
Masters Tournament	0	0	0	0	0	0	1	1
U.S. Open	0	1	0	1	1	1	3	1
The Open Championship	0	0	0	0	0	0	1	0
PGA Championship	0	0	0	0	0	0	1	0
Totals	0	1	0	1	1	1	6	2

== U.S. national team appearances ==
Amateur

- Palmer Cup: 2001 (winners)
- Walker Cup: 2001

== See also ==
- 2011 Nationwide Tour graduates
- 2012 PGA Tour Qualifying School graduates
- List of organ transplant donors and recipients
