= 2004 Canadian Tour =

Golf tour season

2004 Canadian Tour season
- Duration: February 26, 2004 – August 29, 2004
- Number of official events: 13
- Most wins: (United States) Erik Compton (2) (United States) Chris Wisler (2) (United States) Stephen Woodard (2)
- Order of Merit: (United States) Erik Compton

The 2004 Canadian Tour was the 19th season of the Canadian Tour, the main professional golf tour in Canada since it was formed in 1986.

== Schedule ==
The following table lists official events during the 2004 season.

Date	Tournament	Location	Purse (C$)	Winner (Note: The number in parentheses after each winner's name is the number of Canadian Tour events they had won up to and including that tournament.)	OWGR points
Feb 29	Barton Creek Classic	United States	150,000	(United States) Brad Sutterfield (1)	6
Mar 7	Barton Creek Challenge	United States	150,000	(United States) Chris Wisler (2)	6
Apr 18	Greater Sacramento Open	United States	150,000	(United States) Ben Pettitt (2)	6
Apr 25	E-Loan Central Valley Classic	United States	150,000	(United States) Erik Compton (2)	6
May 9	Michelin Guadalajara Classic	Mexico	175,000	(United States) Rob Johnson (3)	6
May 15	Corona Ixtapa Classic	Mexico	175,000	(United States) Jason Higton (1)	6
Jun 13	Lewis Chitengwa Memorial Championship	United States	150,000	(United States) Stephen Gangluff (1)	6
Jun 27	Times Colonist Open	British Columbia	150,000	(Canada) David Hearn (1)	6
Jul 4	Greater Vancouver Classic	British Columbia	150,000	(United States) Ryan Miller (1)	6
Jul 11	MTS Classic	Manitoba	150,000	(United States) Erik Compton (3)	6
Jul 18	Telus Edmonton Open	Alberta	150,000	(United States) Stephen Woodard (1)	6
Aug 1	Montreal Open	Quebec	150,000	(United States) Stephen Woodard (2)	6
Aug 29	Bay Mills Open Players Championship	United States	225,000	(United States) Chris Wisler (3)	6

== Order of Merit ==
The Order of Merit was based on prize money won during the season, calculated in Canadian dollars.

Position	Player	Prize money (C$)
1	(United States) Erik Compton	85,876
2	(United States) Stephen Woodard	83,277
3	(United States) Chris Wisler	65,165
4	(United States) Brad Sutterfield	65,134
5	(Canada) David Hearn	58,461
