= 2013 WGC-Bridgestone Invitational =

Coordinates: 41.008°N 81.508°W

Tournament information
- Dates: August 1–4, 2013
- Location: Akron, Ohio, U.S.
- Course(s): Firestone Country Club; South Course
- Tour(s): PGA Tour; European Tour

Statistics
- Par: 70
- Length: 7,400 yards (6,767 m)
- Field: 73 players
- Cut: None
- Prize fund: $8,750,000 €6,646,156
- Winner's share: $1,500,000 €1,139,341

Champion
- (United States) Tiger Woods
- 265 (−15)

Location in the United States
Location in Ohio

The 2013 WGC-Bridgestone Invitational was a professional golf tournament played August 1–4 on the South Course of Firestone Country Club in Akron, Ohio. It was the 15th WGC-Bridgestone Invitational tournament, and the third of the World Golf Championships (WGC) events held in 2013.

Aided by a second round 61 (−9), Tiger Woods won the event for the eighth time, seven strokes ahead of runners-up Keegan Bradley and Henrik Stenson. It was Woods' 18th WGC victory. The win was also the 79th Tour title for Woods.

== Venue ==
=== Course layout ===
The South Course, opened in 1929, was designed by Bert Way and redesigned by Robert Trent Jones in 1960.

Hole	1	2	3	4	5	6	7	8	9	Out	10	11	12	13	14	15	16	17	18	In	Total
Yards	399	526	442	471	200	469	219	482	494	3702	410	418	180	471	467	221	667	400	464	3698	7400
Par	4	5	4	4	3	4	3	4	4	35	4	4	3	4	4	3	5	4	4	35	70

== Field ==
The field consisted of players drawn primarily from the Official World Golf Ranking and the winners of the world-wide tournaments with the strongest fields.

1. Playing members of the 2012 United States and European Ryder Cup teams.
Keegan Bradley (2,3,4), Nicolas Colsaerts (2,3), Luke Donald (2,3,4), Jason Dufner (2,3), Jim Furyk (2,3), Sergio García (2,3,4), Peter Hanson (2,3,4), Dustin Johnson (2,3,4), Zach Johnson (2,3), Martin Kaymer (2,3), Matt Kuchar (2,3,4), Paul Lawrie (2,4), Graeme McDowell (2,3,4), Rory McIlroy (2,3,4), Phil Mickelson (2,3,4), Francesco Molinari (2,3), Ian Poulter (2,3,4), Justin Rose (2,3,4), Webb Simpson (2,3), Brandt Snedeker (2,3,4), Steve Stricker (2,3), Bubba Watson (2,3), Lee Westwood (2,3), Tiger Woods (2,3,4)

2. The top 50 players from the Official World Golf Ranking as of July 22, 2013.
Jonas Blixt (3,4), Ángel Cabrera (3), Jason Day (3), Jamie Donaldson (3,4), Ernie Els (3,4), Gonzalo Fernández-Castaño (3,4), Rickie Fowler (3), Bill Haas (3,4), Branden Grace (3,4), Billy Horschel (3,4), Martin Laird (3,4), Matteo Manassero (3,4), Hideki Matsuyama (3), Ryan Moore (3,4), Thorbjørn Olesen (3), Scott Piercy (3), Carl Pettersson (3), Charl Schwartzel (3,4,5), Adam Scott (3,4), Henrik Stenson (3), Richard Sterne (3), Kevin Streelman (3,4), Bo Van Pelt (3), Nick Watney (3,4)

- Louis Oosthuizen (3,4) withdrew with a neck injury.
- Hunter Mahan (3) withdrew after the birth of his first child the prior week.

3. The top 50 players from the Official World Golf Ranking as of July 29, 2013.
David Lynn

4. Tournament winners, whose victories are considered official, of tournaments from the Federation Tours since the prior season's Bridgestone Invitational with an Official World Golf Ranking Strength of Field Rating of 115 points or more.
Kiradech Aphibarnrat, Bae Sang-moon, Paul Casey, Ken Duke, Harris English, Derek Ernst, Tommy Gainey, Stephen Gallacher, Brian Gay, Russell Henley, Mikko Ilonen, Miguel Ángel Jiménez, Shane Lowry, John Merrick, D. A. Points, Richie Ramsay, Brett Rumford, Michael Thompson, Boo Weekley, Chris Wood

- Peter Senior and Jordan Spieth did not play.

5. The winner of selected tournaments from each of the following tours:

- Asian Tour: Thailand Golf Championship (2012) – Charl Schwartzel, also qualified in categories 2, 3, and 4
- PGA Tour of Australasia: Australian PGA Championship (2012) – Daniel Popovic
- Japan Golf Tour: Bridgestone Open (2012) – Toru Taniguchi
- Japan Golf Tour: Japan Golf Tour Championship (2013) – Satoshi Kodaira
- Sunshine Tour: Dimension Data Pro-Am (2013) – Jaco van Zyl

== Round summaries ==
=== First round ===
Thursday, August 1, 2013

Place	Player	Score	To par
1	(United States) Webb Simpson	64	−6
2	(Sweden) Henrik Stenson	65	−5
T3	(United States) Keegan Bradley	66	−4
T3	(United States) Ryan Moore	66	−4
T3	(England) Chris Wood	66	−4
T3	(United States) Tiger Woods	66	−4
T7	(England) Luke Donald	67	−3
T7	(United States) Jason Dufner	67	−3
T7	(United States) Rickie Fowler	67	−3
T7	(United States) Jim Furyk	67	−3
T7	(United States) Bill Haas	67	−3
T7	(United States) Bubba Watson	67	−3

=== Second round ===
Friday, August 2, 2013

Place	Player	Score	To par
1	(United States) Tiger Woods	66-61=127	−13
T2	(United States) Keegan Bradley	66-68=134	−6
T2	(England) Chris Wood	66-68=134	−6
T4	(United States) Bill Haas	67-68=135	−5
T4	(Sweden) Henrik Stenson	65-70=135	−5
T6	(England) Luke Donald	67-69=136	−4
T6	(United States) Jason Dufner	67-69=136	−4
T6	(United States) Jim Furyk	67-69=136	−4
T6	(United States) Bubba Watson	67-69=136	−4
10	(Thailand) Kiradech Aphibarnrat	69-68=137	−3

=== Third round ===
Saturday, August 3, 2013

Place	Player	Score	To par
1	(United States) Tiger Woods	66-61-68=195	−15
2	(Sweden) Henrik Stenson	65-70-67=202	−8
3	(United States) Jason Dufner	67-69-67=203	−7
T4	(England) Luke Donald	67-69-68=204	−6
T4	(United States) Bill Haas	67-68-69=204	−6
T4	(England) Chris Wood	66-68-70=204	−6
T7	(United States) Keegan Bradley	66-68-71=205	−5
T7	(Spain) Miguel Ángel Jiménez	71-69-65=205	−5
T9	(United States) Zach Johnson	69-70-68=207	−3
T9	(Australia) Adam Scott	73-68-66=207	−3

=== Final round ===
Sunday, August 4, 2013

Place	Player	Score	To par	Money ($)
1	(United States) Tiger Woods	66-61-68-70=265	−15	1,500,000
T2	(United States) Keegan Bradley	66-68-71-67=272	−8	692,500
T2	(Sweden) Henrik Stenson	65-70-67-70=272	−8	692,500
T4	(United States) Jason Dufner	67-69-67-71=274	−6	312,667
T4	(Spain) Miguel Ángel Jiménez	71-69-65-69=274	−6	312,667
T4	(United States) Zach Johnson	69-70-68-67=274	−6	312,667
T7	(United States) Bill Haas	67-68-69-71=275	−5	205,000
T7	(England) Chris Wood	66-68-70-71=275	−5	205,000
T9	(England) Luke Donald	67-69-68-72=276	−4	145,750
T9	(United States) Jim Furyk	67-69-72-68=276	−4	145,750
T9	(Germany) Martin Kaymer	74-67-69-66=276	−4	145,750
T9	(South Africa) Richard Sterne	70-68-70-68=276	−4	145,750

==== Scorecard ====
Final round

Hole	1	2	3	4	5	6	7	8	9	10	11	12	13	14	15	16	17	18
Par	4	5	4	4	3	4	3	4	4	4	4	3	4	4	3	5	4	4
(United States) Woods	−15	−15	−15	−15	−15	−15	−15	−15	−15	−16	−16	−16	−16	−15	−15	−15	−15	−15
(United States) Bradley	−5	−6	−5	−5	−6	−7	−7	−7	−8	−8	−8	−7	−7	−7	−7	−7	−8	−8
(Sweden) Stenson	−8	−8	−7	−7	−7	−7	−7	−7	−7	−7	−7	−7	−7	−7	−7	−7	−8	−8
(United States) Dufner	−8	−8	−8	−7	−7	−7	−7	−7	−7	−7	−7	−7	−8	−7	−7	−6	−6	−6
(Spain) Jiménez	−5	−6	−6	−6	−7	−7	−7	−6	−6	−7	−7	−7	−6	−6	−6	−6	−6	−6
(United States) Johnson	−4	−4	−4	−4	−4	−3	−4	−5	−4	−4	−4	−4	−4	−4	−4	−5	−6	−6

Cumulative tournament scores, relative to par

Birdie	Bogey
