= Brad Sutterfield =

American golfer and coach (born 1969)

Personal information
- Nationality: United States
- Born: February 23, 1969 (age 57) Bellevue, Washington, U.S.
- Height: 6 ft 0 in (1.83 m)
- Weight: 175 lb (79 kg; 12.5 st)
- Spouse: Tanya Hansen
- Children: Drew, Camryn, Avery

Career
- Sport: Golf
- College: Brigham Young University
- Turned professional: 1995
- Former tours: PGA Tour; European Tour; Challenge Tour; Nationwide Tour; Asian Tour; Canadian Tour
- Professional wins: 3

Number of wins by tour
- Challenge Tour: 2
- Other: 1

Brad Sutterfield (born February 23, 1969) is an American professional golfer who played on the PGA Tour, European Tour, Challenge Tour, Nationwide Tour, Asian Tour and the Canadian Tour.

== Career ==
Sutterfield played college golf with Mike Weir at Brigham Young University.

Sutterfield joined the PGA Tour in 1997, earning his Tour card through qualifying school but wasn't able to retain his card. His only other full season on the PGA or Nationwide Tour came in 2007 when he played on the Nationwide Tour. He joined the Challenge Tour in 2005 where he won two events, the TIM Peru Open and the Open de Toulouse. He split time between the European Tour and the Challenge Tour in 2006. He also played on the Canadian Tour from 1999 to 2006 and won the Barton Creek Classic in 2004. He has also played on the Asian Tour.

He is the current head coach of the men's golf team at Utah Tech University.

== Professional wins (3) ==
=== Challenge Tour wins (2) ===
No.	Date	Tournament	Winning score	Margin of victory	Runners-up
1	Dec 12, 2004 (2005 season)	TIM Peru Open^{1}	−12 (70-66-71-69=276)	1 stroke	(England) Stuart Davis, (Northern Ireland) Michael Hoey
2	Oct 2, 2005	Open de Toulouse	−17 (69-70-66-66=271)	2 strokes	(England) David Dixon, (Sweden) Steven Jeppesen, (Norway) Jan-Are Larsen, (Argentina) Andrés Romero

^{1}Co-sanctioned by the Tour de las Américas

=== Canadian Tour wins (1) ===
No.	Date	Tournament	Winning score	Margin of victory	Runner-up
1	Feb 29, 2004	Barton Creek Classic	−8 (70-69-72-69=280)	Playoff	(United States) Mario Tiziani

== See also ==
- 1996 PGA Tour Qualifying School graduates
