= 2013 WGC-Cadillac Championship =

Coordinates: 25.815°N 80.340°W

Tournament information
- Dates: March 7–10, 2013
- Location: Doral, Florida, U.S.
- Course(s): Doral Golf Resort & Spa
- Tour(s): PGA Tour; European Tour

Statistics
- Par: 72
- Length: 7,334 yards (6,706 m)
- Field: 65 players
- Cut: None
- Prize fund: $8,750,000 €6,647,218
- Winner's share: $1,500,000 €1,139,523

Champion
- (United States) Tiger Woods
- 269 (−19)

Location in the United States

The 2013 WGC-Cadillac Championship was a golf tournament played March 7–10 on the TPC Blue Monster course at Doral Golf Resort & Spa in Doral, Florida, a suburb west of Miami. It was the 14th WGC-Cadillac Championship tournament, and the second of the World Golf Championships events to be staged in 2013.

Tiger Woods won with a score of 19-under-par, two strokes ahead of runner-up Steve Stricker. It was the seventh time Woods had won the event and was his 17th WGC victory.

== Course layout ==
The tournament is played on the TPC Blue Monster course.

| Hole | 1 | 2 | 3 | 4 | 5 | 6 | 7 | 8 | 9 | Out | 10 | 11 | 12 | 13 | 14 | 15 | 16 | 17 | 18 | In | Total |
|---|---|---|---|---|---|---|---|---|---|---|---|---|---|---|---|---|---|---|---|---|---|
| Yards | 529 | 418 | 438 | 236 | 394 | 442 | 454 | 560 | 169 | 3,640 | 551 | 402 | 603 | 245 | 460 | 175 | 372 | 419 | 467 | 3,694 | 7,334 |
| Par | 5 | 4 | 4 | 3 | 4 | 4 | 4 | 5 | 3 | 36 | 5 | 4 | 5 | 3 | 4 | 3 | 4 | 4 | 4 | 36 | 72 |

== Field ==
The field consisted of players from the top of the Official World Golf Ranking and the money lists/Order of Merit from the six main professional golf tours. Each player is classified according to the first category in which he qualified, but other categories are shown in parentheses. A total of 69 players qualified but four of these did not play and the field was reduced to 65. Michael Hendry, John Huh, Scott Jamieson, John Merrick and Michael Thompson played in their first WGC event.

1. The top 50 players from the Official World Golf Ranking, as of February 25, 2013
Keegan Bradley (2,3), Tim Clark, George Coetzee (2,6,9), Nicolas Colsaerts (2,5), Jason Day (2), Luke Donald (2,3,5), Jamie Donaldson (2,5,6), Jason Dufner (2,3), Ernie Els (2,3), Gonzalo Fernández-Castaño (2,5), Rickie Fowler (2,3), Jim Furyk (2,3), Sergio García (2,3), Robert Garrigus (2,3), Branden Grace (2,5,9), Bill Haas (2), Peter Hanson (2,5), Pádraig Harrington, Freddie Jacobson (2), Dustin Johnson (2,3,4), Zach Johnson (2,3), Martin Kaymer (2), Matt Kuchar (2,3,4), Paul Lawrie (2,5), Hunter Mahan (2,3,4), Matteo Manassero (2,5), Graeme McDowell (2,5), Rory McIlroy (2,3,5), Phil Mickelson (2,3,4), Francesco Molinari (2,5), Ryan Moore (2,3), Alex Norén, Thorbjørn Olesen (2,5,6), Louis Oosthuizen (2,3,5,6), Carl Pettersson (2,3), Scott Piercy (2,3), Ian Poulter (2,5,6), Justin Rose (2,3,5), Charl Schwartzel (2,5,6), Adam Scott (2,3), John Senden (2,3), Webb Simpson (2,3), Steve Stricker (2,3), Bo Van Pelt (2,3), Nick Watney (2,3), Bubba Watson (2,3), Lee Westwood (2,3,5), Tiger Woods (2,3,4)

- Hiroyuki Fujita (2,7) did not compete.
- Brandt Snedeker (2,3,4) withdrew with a rib injury.

2. The top 50 players from the Official World Golf Ranking, as of March 4, 2013
David Lynn (5), Geoff Ogilvy, Michael Thompson

3. The top 30 players from the final 2012 FedExCup Points List
John Huh

4. The top 10 players from the 2013 FedExCup Points List, as of March 4, 2013
Brian Gay, Russell Henley, Charles Howell III, John Merrick

5. The top 20 players from the final 2012 European Tour Order of Merit
Rafa Cabrera-Bello, Marcel Siem

6. The top 10 players from the 2013 European Tour Order of Merit, as of February 25, 2013
Stephen Gallacher, Scott Jamieson, Richard Sterne, Chris Wood

7. The top 2 players from the final 2012 Japan Golf Tour Order of Merit

- Toru Taniguchi did not compete.

8. The top 2 players from the final 2012 PGA Tour of Australasia Order of Merit
Michael Hendry

- Peter Senior did not compete.

9. The top 2 players from the final 2012 Sunshine Tour Order of Merit

10. The top 2 players from the final 2012 Asian Tour Order of Merit
Marcus Fraser, Thaworn Wiratchant

== Round summaries ==
=== First round ===
Thursday, March 7, 2013

| Place | Player | Score | To par |
|---|---|---|---|
| T1 | (Spain) Sergio García | 66 | −6 |
| T1 | (Sweden) Freddie Jacobson | 66 | −6 |
| T1 | (Northern Ireland) Graeme McDowell | 66 | −6 |
| T1 | (United States) Bubba Watson | 66 | −6 |
| T1 | (United States) Tiger Woods | 66 | −6 |
| T6 | (Sweden) Peter Hanson | 67 | −5 |
| T6 | (United States) Hunter Mahan | 67 | −5 |
| T6 | (United States) Phil Mickelson | 67 | −5 |
| T6 | (United States) Steve Stricker | 67 | −5 |
| T10 | (United States) Keegan Bradley | 68 | −4 |
| T10 | (United States) Charles Howell III | 68 | −4 |
| T10 | (United States) Dustin Johnson | 68 | −4 |
| T10 | (England) Ian Poulter | 68 | −4 |
| T10 | (England) Justin Rose | 68 | −4 |
| T10 | (United States) Bo Van Pelt | 68 | −4 |

=== Second round ===
Friday, March 8, 2013

| Place | Player | Score | To par |
|---|---|---|---|
| 1 | (United States) Tiger Woods | 66-65=131 | −13 |
| 2 | (Northern Ireland) Graeme McDowell | 66-67=133 | −11 |
| T3 | (United States) Phil Mickelson | 67-67=134 | −10 |
| T3 | (United States) Steve Stricker | 67-67=134 | −10 |
| T5 | (Sweden) Freddie Jacobson | 66-69=135 | −9 |
| T5 | (United States) Bubba Watson | 66-69=135 | −9 |
| T7 | (United States) Keegan Bradley | 68-68=136 | −8 |
| T7 | (South Africa) Charl Schwartzel | 71-65=136 | −8 |
| 9 | (United States) Dustin Johnson | 68-69=137 | −7 |
| T10 | (United States) Jason Dufner | 69-69=138 | −6 |
| T10 | (United States) Rickie Fowler | 69-69=138 | −6 |
| T10 | (Spain) Sergio García | 66-72=138 | −6 |
| T10 | (Sweden) Peter Hanson | 67-71=138 | −6 |
| T10 | (New Zealand) Michael Hendry | 72-66=138 | −6 |
| T10 | (United States) John Huh | 71-67=138 | −6 |
| T10 | (United States) Zach Johnson | 71-67=138 | −6 |
| T10 | (England) Ian Poulter | 68-70=138 | −6 |
| T10 | (Australia) John Senden | 69-69=138 | −6 |
| T10 | (Thailand) Thaworn Wiratchant | 69-69=138 | −6 |
| T10 | (United States) Michael Thompson | 69-69=138 | −6 |

=== Third round ===
Saturday, March 9, 2013

| Place | Player | Score | To par |
|---|---|---|---|
| 1 | (United States) Tiger Woods | 66-65-67=198 | −18 |
| 2 | (Northern Ireland) Graeme McDowell | 66-67-69=202 | −14 |
| T3 | (United States) Phil Mickelson | 67-67-69=203 | −13 |
| T3 | (United States) Steve Stricker | 67-67-69=203 | −13 |
| T5 | (United States) Keegan Bradley | 68-68-69=205 | −11 |
| T5 | (Spain) Sergio García | 66-72-67=205 | −11 |
| T5 | (South Africa) Charl Schwartzel | 71-65-69=205 | −11 |
| T5 | (United States) Michael Thompson | 69-69-67=205 | −11 |
| T9 | (Sweden) Freddie Jacobson | 66-69-71=206 | −10 |
| T9 | (United States) Bubba Watson | 66-69-71=206 | −10 |

=== Final round ===
Sunday, March 10, 2013

| Place | Player | Score | To par | Money ($) |
|---|---|---|---|---|
| 1 | (United States) Tiger Woods | 66-65-67-71=269 | −19 | 1,500,000 |
| 2 | (United States) Steve Stricker | 67-67-69-68=271 | −17 | 880,000 |
| T3 | (Spain) Sergio García | 66-72-67-69=274 | −14 | 417,500 |
| T3 | (Northern Ireland) Graeme McDowell | 66-67-69-72=274 | −14 | 417,500 |
| T3 | (United States) Phil Mickelson | 67-67-69-71=274 | −14 | 417,500 |
| T3 | (Australia) Adam Scott | 72-70-68-64=274 | −14 | 417,500 |
| 7 | (United States) Keegan Bradley | 68-68-69-71=276 | −12 | 240,000 |
| T8 | (Sweden) Peter Hanson | 67-71-70-70=278 | −10 | 163,750 |
| T8 | (Northern Ireland) Rory McIlroy | 73-69-71-65=278 | −10 | 163,750 |
| T8 | (England) Justin Rose | 68-72-70-68=278 | −10 | 163,750 |
| T8 | (United States) Michael Thompson | 69-69-67-73=278 | −10 | 163,750 |

==== Scorecard ====
Final round

| Hole | 1 | 2 | 3 | 4 | 5 | 6 | 7 | 8 | 9 | 10 | 11 | 12 | 13 | 14 | 15 | 16 | 17 | 18 |
|---|---|---|---|---|---|---|---|---|---|---|---|---|---|---|---|---|---|---|
| Par | 5 | 4 | 4 | 3 | 4 | 4 | 4 | 5 | 3 | 5 | 4 | 5 | 3 | 4 | 3 | 4 | 4 | 4 |
| (United States) Woods | −18 | −19 | −19 | −20 | −20 | −20 | −20 | −20 | −20 | −21 | −21 | −21 | −21 | −21 | −21 | −20 | −20 | −19 |
| (United States) Stricker | −14 | −14 | −13 | −13 | −14 | −15 | −15 | −15 | −15 | −16 | −16 | −16 | −17 | −17 | −17 | −17 | −17 | −17 |
| (Spain) García | −12 | −12 | −12 | −12 | −12 | −12 | −12 | −12 | −12 | −12 | −12 | −13 | −13 | −14 | −15 | −15 | −15 | −14 |
| (Northern Ireland) McDowell | −15 | −16 | −16 | −16 | −15 | −15 | −15 | −15 | −15 | −15 | −14 | −14 | −15 | −15 | −15 | −15 | −16 | −14 |
| (United States) Mickelson | −14 | −15 | −14 | −14 | −15 | −15 | −15 | −16 | −15 | −15 | −14 | −14 | −14 | −14 | −14 | −14 | −14 | −14 |
| (Australia) Scott | −7 | −8 | −8 | −9 | −9 | −9 | −10 | −10 | −10 | −11 | −12 | −13 | −13 | −14 | −14 | −14 | −14 | −14 |
