= 2013 PGA Tour =

Golf tour season

2013 PGA Tour season
- Duration: January 4, 2013 – September 22, 2013
- Number of official events: 40
- Most wins: (United States) Tiger Woods (5)
- FedEx Cup: (Sweden) Henrik Stenson
- Money list: (United States) Tiger Woods
- PGA Tour Player of the Year: (United States) Tiger Woods
- PGA Player of the Year: (United States) Tiger Woods
- Rookie of the Year: (United States) Jordan Spieth

The 2013 PGA Tour was the 98th season of the PGA Tour, the main professional golf tour in the United States. It was also the 45th season since separating from the PGA of America, and the seventh edition of the FedEx Cup.

== Changes for 2013 ==
The season ran from January to September, the shorter-than-usual schedule aiding in the transition from the long-running January–December schedule to the new wraparound October–September schedule. It was the last season to be held entirely in one calendar year until 2024; the 2013–14 season would begin in October 2013.

== Schedule ==
The following table lists official events during the 2013 season.

Date	Tournament	Location	Purse (US$)	Winner (Note: The number in parentheses after each winner's name is the number of PGA Tour events they had won up to and including that tournament. This information is only shown for PGA Tour members.)	OWGR points	Notes
Jan 8	Hyundai Tournament of Champions	Hawaii	5,700,000	(United States) Dustin Johnson (7)	46	Winners-only event
Jan 13	Sony Open in Hawaii	Hawaii	5,600,000	(United States) Russell Henley (1)	38	
Jan 20	Humana Challenge	California	5,600,000	(United States) Brian Gay (4)	44	Pro-Am
Jan 28	Farmers Insurance Open	California	6,100,000	(United States) Tiger Woods (75)	50	
Feb 3	Waste Management Phoenix Open	Arizona	6,200,000	(United States) Phil Mickelson (41)	52	
Feb 10	AT&T Pebble Beach National Pro-Am	California	6,500,000	(United States) Brandt Snedeker (5)	40	Pro-Am
Feb 17	Northern Trust Open	California	6,600,000	(United States) John Merrick (1)	60	
Feb 24	WGC-Accenture Match Play Championship	Arizona	8,750,000	(United States) Matt Kuchar (5)	74	World Golf Championship
Mar 3	The Honda Classic	Florida	6,000,000	(United States) Michael Thompson (1)	56	
Mar 10	WGC-Cadillac Championship	Florida	8,750,000	(United States) Tiger Woods (76)	74	World Golf Championship
Mar 10	Puerto Rico Open	Puerto Rico	3,500,000	(United States) Scott Brown (1)	24	Alternate event
Mar 17	Tampa Bay Championship	Florida	5,500,000	(United States) Kevin Streelman (1)	52	
Mar 25	Arnold Palmer Invitational	Florida	6,200,000	(United States) Tiger Woods (77)	66	Invitational
Mar 31	Shell Houston Open	Texas	6,200,000	(United States) D. A. Points (2)	56	
Apr 7	Valero Texas Open	Texas	6,200,000	(Scotland) Martin Laird (3)	44	
Apr 14	Masters Tournament	Georgia	8,000,000	(Australia) Adam Scott (9)	100	Major championship
Apr 21	RBC Heritage	South Carolina	5,800,000	(Northern Ireland) Graeme McDowell (2)	52	Invitational
Apr 28	Zurich Classic of New Orleans	Louisiana	6,600,000	(United States) Billy Horschel (1)	44	
May 5	Wells Fargo Championship	North Carolina	6,700,000	(United States) Derek Ernst (1)	52	
May 12	The Players Championship	Florida	9,500,000	(United States) Tiger Woods (78)	80	Flagship event
May 19	HP Byron Nelson Championship	Texas	6,700,000	(South Korea) Bae Sang-moon (1)	40	
May 26	Crowne Plaza Invitational at Colonial	Texas	6,400,000	(United States) Boo Weekley (3)	46	Invitational
Jun 2	Memorial Tournament	Ohio	6,200,000	(United States) Matt Kuchar (6)	70	Invitational
Jun 9	FedEx St. Jude Classic	Tennessee	5,700,000	(United States) Harris English (1)	34	
Jun 16	U.S. Open	Pennsylvania	8,000,000	(England) Justin Rose (5)	100	Major championship
Jun 23	Travelers Championship	Connecticut	6,100,000	(United States) Ken Duke (1)	48	
Jun 30	AT&T National	Maryland	6,500,000	(United States) Bill Haas (5)	46	Invitational
Jul 7	Greenbrier Classic	West Virginia	6,300,000	(Sweden) Jonas Blixt (2)	42	
Jul 14	John Deere Classic	Illinois	4,600,000	(United States) Jordan Spieth (1)	36	
Jul 21	The Open Championship	Scotland	£5,250,000	(United States) Phil Mickelson (42)	100	Major championship
Jul 21	Sanderson Farms Championship	Mississippi	3,000,000	(United States) Woody Austin (4)	24	Alternate event
Jul 28	RBC Canadian Open	Canada	5,600,000	(United States) Brandt Snedeker (6)	46	
Aug 4	WGC-Bridgestone Invitational	Ohio	8,750,000	(United States) Tiger Woods (79)	76	World Golf Championship
Aug 4	Reno–Tahoe Open	Nevada	3,000,000	(United States) Gary Woodland (2)	24	Alternate event
Aug 11	PGA Championship	New York	8,000,000	(United States) Jason Dufner (3)	100	Major championship
Aug 18	Wyndham Championship	North Carolina	5,300,000	(United States) Patrick Reed (1)	44	
Aug 25	The Barclays	New Jersey	8,000,000	(Australia) Adam Scott (10)	74	FedEx Cup playoff event
Sep 2	Deutsche Bank Championship	Massachusetts	8,000,000	(Sweden) Henrik Stenson (3)	74	FedEx Cup playoff event
Sep 16	BMW Championship	Illinois	8,000,000	(United States) Zach Johnson (10)	72	FedEx Cup playoff event
Sep 22	Tour Championship	Georgia	8,000,000	(Sweden) Henrik Stenson (4)	60	FedEx Cup playoff event

=== Unofficial events ===
The following events were sanctioned by the PGA Tour, but did not carry FedEx Cup points or official money, nor were wins official.

Date	Tournament	Location	Purse ($)	Winners	OWGR points	Notes
Mar 26	Tavistock Cup	Florida	2,170,000	Team Albany	n/a	Team event
Jun 25	CVS Caremark Charity Classic	Rhode Island	1,500,000	(United States) Steve Stricker and (United States) Bo Van Pelt	n/a	Team event
Oct 6	Presidents Cup	Ohio	n/a	Team USA	n/a	Team event

== Location of tournaments ==
Location of official tournaments of the 2013 PGA Tour in the continental United States and Canada.
600-point event (Players & Majors)
550-point event (World Golf Championships)
500-point event (Regular events)
300-point event (Alternate events)
FedEx Cup playoff event
Location of official tournaments of the 2013 PGA Tour outside the continental United States and Canada.
600-point event (Players & Majors)
500-point event (Regular events)
300-point event (Alternate events)

== FedEx Cup ==
=== Final standings ===
For full rankings, see 2013 FedEx Cup Playoffs.

Final top 10 players in the FedEx Cup:

Position	Player	Points	Bonus money ($)
1	(Sweden) Henrik Stenson	4,750	10,000,000
2	(United States) Tiger Woods	2,743	3,000,000
3	(United States) Steve Stricker	2,650	2,000,000
4	(Australia) Adam Scott	2,278	1,500,000
5	(United States) Zach Johnson	2,238	1,000,000
6	(United States) Matt Kuchar	1,823	800,000
7	(United States) Jordan Spieth	1,690	700,000
8	(Canada) Graham DeLaet	1,415	600,000
9	(United States) Phil Mickelson	1,313	550,000
10	(England) Justin Rose	1,300	500,000

== Money list ==
The money list was based on prize money won during the season, calculated in U.S. dollars.

Position	Player	Prize money ($)
1	(United States) Tiger Woods	8,553,439
2	(Sweden) Henrik Stenson	6,388,230
3	(United States) Matt Kuchar	5,616,808
4	(United States) Phil Mickelson	5,495,793
5	(United States) Brandt Snedeker	5,318,087
6	(Australia) Adam Scott	4,892,611
7	(United States) Steve Stricker	4,440,532
8	(England) Justin Rose	4,146,148
9	(United States) Zach Johnson	4,044,509
10	(United States) Jordan Spieth	3,879,820

== Awards ==
Award	Winner	Ref.
PGA Tour Player of the Year (Jack Nicklaus Trophy)	(United States) Tiger Woods	
PGA Player of the Year	(United States) Tiger Woods	
Rookie of the Year	(United States) Jordan Spieth	
Scoring leader (PGA Tour – Byron Nelson Award)	(United States) Steve Stricker	
Scoring leader (PGA – Vardon Trophy)	(United States) Tiger Woods	
PGA Tour Courage Award	(United States) Erik Compton	

== See also ==
- 2013 in golf
- 2013 Champions Tour
- 2013 Web.com Tour
