= David Hearn (golfer) =

Canadian professional golfer (born 1979)

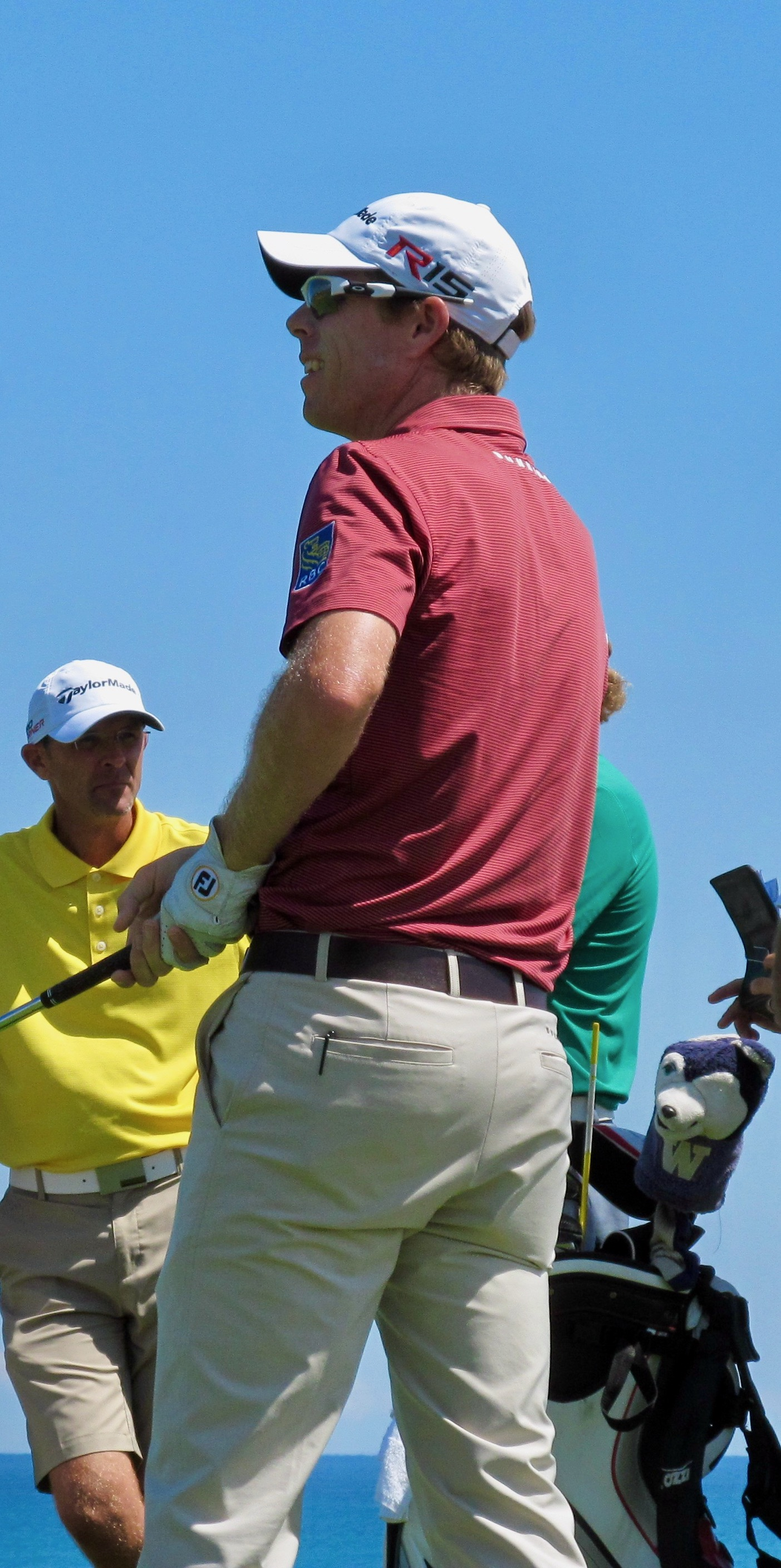
- Hearn at the 2015 PGA Championship

Personal information
- Full name: David Geoffrey Hearn
- Nationality: Canada
- Born: June 17, 1979 (age 47) Brampton, Ontario, Canada
- Height: 6 ft 1 in (1.85 m)
- Weight: 165 lb (75 kg; 11.8 st)

Career
- Sport: Golf
- College: University of Wyoming
- Turned professional: 2001
- Current tour: PGA Tour
- Former tours: Nationwide Tour; Canadian Tour; Asian Tour
- Professional wins: 2
- Highest ranking: 88 (May 25, 2014)

Number of wins by tour
- Korn Ferry Tour: 1
- Other: 1

Best results in major championships
- Masters Tournament: DNP
- PGA Championship: T47: 2013
- U.S. Open: T21: 2013
- The Open Championship: T32: 2014

David Geoffrey Hearn (born June 17, 1979) is a Canadian professional golfer who plays on the PGA Tour. He has also played on the Nationwide Tour, Canadian Tour and the Asian Tour.

== Early life and amateur career ==
In 1979, Hearn was born in Brampton, Ontario. He attended the University of Wyoming where he played on the golf team.

In 2001, Hearn was a member of the winning Canadian team at the Four Nations Cup tournament. He played out of the Brantford Golf and Country Club as an amateur.

== Professional career ==
In 2001, Hearn turned professional. In 2002, he was named the Canadian Tour Rookie of the Year. Hearn made his first cut in a major championship at the 2013 U.S. Open, finishing tied for 21st.

In June 2013, Hearn finished in a tie for second at the John Deere Classic, after losing in a three-man playoff, which also included Zach Johnson and Jordan Spieth. After all three players had parred the first and second extra holes, Hearn had two opportunities at the third and fourth extra holes to seal the win, but could not hole either of the makeable putts. The playoff ended at the fifth extra hole when Spieth made par to Hearn and Johnson's bogeys. This was Hearn's best finish to date on the PGA Tour, beating his previous tie for fifth at the 2011 Shriners Hospitals for Children Open.

Hearn lost another sudden-death playoff in July 2015, at the Greenbrier Classic. He had a putt at the 72nd hole to win the tournament outright but left the 20-footer short of the cup. In the four-man playoff, Danny Lee and Hearn holed birdie putts at the first extra hole to eliminate Kevin Kisner and Robert Streb who both missed the green at the par three. Then on the second extra hole, Hearn found trouble off his drive and could only bogey the par five, allowing Lee to claim victory with a two-putt par. This was Hearn's second runner-up finish on the PGA Tour, losing both times in playoffs.

At the RBC Canadian Open in July 2015, Hearn held the 54-hole lead at 15-under-par, with a two-stroke advantage over Jason Day and Bubba Watson. He entered the final round with a chance to become the first home-winner of the event in 61 years and win his first PGA Tour event, but finished the day in solo third behind Day, the winner, and Watson after a level-par round of 72.

== Awards and honors ==
In 2002, Hearn earned the Canadian Tour's Rookie of the Year honors.

== Professional wins (2) ==
=== Nationwide Tour wins (1) ===
No.	Date	Tournament	Winning score	To par	Margin of victory	Runner-up
1	Aug 22, 2004	Alberta Classic	70-65-67-71=273	−15	1 stroke	(Australia) David McKenzie

=== Canadian Tour wins (1) ===
No.	Date	Tournament	Winning score	To par	Margin of victory	Runner-up
1	Jun 27, 2004	Times Colonist Open	70-71-64-68=273	−15	3 strokes	(Canada) James Lepp (a)

== Playoff record ==
PGA Tour playoff record (0–2)

No.	Year	Tournament	Opponents	Result
1	2013	John Deere Classic	(United States) Zach Johnson, (United States) Jordan Spieth	Spieth won with par on fifth extra hole
2	2015	Greenbrier Classic	(United States) Kevin Kisner, (New Zealand) Danny Lee, (United States) Robert Streb	Lee won with par on second extra hole Kisner and Streb eliminated by birdie on first hole

== Results in major championships ==
Tournament	2005	2006	2007	2008	2009	2010	2011	2012	2013	2014	2015
Masters Tournament											
U.S. Open	CUT			CUT					T21		CUT
The Open Championship										T32	CUT
PGA Championship									T47	CUT	CUT

Did not play

CUT = missed the half-way cut
"T" indicates a tie for a place

== Results in The Players Championship ==
Tournament	2012	2013	2014	2015	2016	2017
The Players Championship	T68	T26	T6	T42	T28	T69

Top 10

"T" indicates a tie for a place

== Team appearances ==
Professional

- World Cup (representing Canada): 2013, 2016

== See also ==
- 2004 PGA Tour Qualifying School graduates
- 2010 Nationwide Tour graduates
- 2019 Korn Ferry Tour Finals graduates
