= 2013 Volvo World Match Play Championship =

Tournament information
- Dates: 16–19 May
- Location: Kavarna, Bulgaria; 43.413°N 28.2801°E
- Courses: Thracian Cliffs Golf & Beach Resort
- Tour: European Tour
- Format: Match play – 18 holes

Statistics
- Par: 72
- Length: 7,291 yards (6,667 m)
- Field: 24 players
- Prize fund: €3,000,000
- Winner's share: €800,000

Champion
- (Northern Ireland) Graeme McDowell
- def. Thongchai Jaidee 2 & 1
- Location in Bulgaria

The 2013 Volvo World Match Play Championship was the 48th Volvo World Match Play Championship played. It was held 16–19 May, with the champion receiving €800,000. The format was 24 players split into eight pools of three, with the top two in each pool progressing to the knock-out stage. It was an official money event on the European Tour.

Graeme McDowell of Northern Ireland defeated Thongchai Jaidee of Thailand, 2 & 1, in the final.

== Course ==
	1	2	3	4	5	6	7	8	9	Out	10	11	12	13	14	15	16	17	18	In	Total
Yards	457	210	416	692	573	382	157	231	330	3,448	343	419	546	390	396	466	587	174	522	3,843	7,291
Par	4	3	4	5	5	4	3	3	4	35	4	4	5	4	4	4	5	3	4	37	72

== Format ==
The 24 players were split into eight pools of three, with the top two in each pool seeded by their Official World Golf Ranking and the remaining eight randomly assigned to a pool. Within each pool, every player played each other in a round-robin format over 18-hole matches. Points were awarded based upon win (2), tie (1) or loss (0). The two leading players from each pool advanced to the knock-out stage. In case of ties, sudden-death playoffs were used to determine rankings.

== Participants ==
Seed	Player	Rank
1	(Northern Ireland) Graeme McDowell	8
2	(England) Ian Poulter	15
3	(Sweden) Peter Hanson	23
4	(United States) Bo Van Pelt	26
5	(South Africa) Branden Grace	31
6	(Sweden) Henrik Stenson	32
7	(Denmark) Thorbjørn Olesen	33
8	(Spain) Gonzalo Fernández-Castaño	34
9	(Wales) Jamie Donaldson	37
10	(Sweden) Carl Pettersson	39
11	(Italy) Francesco Molinari	43
12	(Belgium) Nicolas Colsaerts	44
13	(South Africa) Richard Sterne	51
14	(South Africa) George Coetzee	52
15	(Thailand) Thongchai Jaidee	63
16	(England) Chris Wood	66
	(Australia) Geoff Ogilvy	69
	(Scotland) Stephen Gallacher	71
	(Australia) Brett Rumford	76
	(Republic of Ireland) Shane Lowry	84
	(Thailand) Kiradech Aphibarnrat	85
	(Scotland) Scott Jamieson	90
	(South Africa) Thomas Aiken	102
	(Chile) Felipe Aguilar	127

== Pool play ==
- Round 1, 16 May
- Round 2, 17 May, morning
- Round 3, 17 May, afternoon

Pool Ballesteros
Winner	Score	Loser
Graeme McDowell	5 & 3	Chris Wood
Chris Wood	2 & 1	Stephen Gallacher
Graeme McDowell	4 & 2	Stephen Gallacher

- 1st – McDowell
- 2nd – Wood
- 3rd – Gallacher

Pool Gabrielsson
Winner	Score	Loser
Thongchai Jaidee	3 & 2	Ian Poulter
Thongchai Jaidee	1 up	Thomas Aiken
Thomas Aiken	1 up	Ian Poulter

- 1st – Jaidee
- 2nd – Aiken
- 3rd – Poulter

Pool Palmer
Winner	Score	Loser
Peter Hanson	2 & 1	George Coetzee
George Coetzee	3 & 2	Shane Lowry
Shane Lowry	5 & 4	Peter Hanson

- 1st – Lowry (Lowry takes first place with birdie on second extra hole.)
- 2nd – Hanson (Hanson takes second place with par on second extra hole.)
- 3rd – Coetzee

Pool Larson
Winner	Score	Loser
Bo Van Pelt	Halved	Richard Sterne
Richard Sterne	5 & 4	Geoff Ogilvy
Bo Van Pelt	Halved	Geoff Ogilvy

- 1st – Sterne
- 2nd – Van Pelt
- 3rd – Ogilvy

Pool Woosnam
Winner	Score	Loser
Branden Grace	4 & 3	Nicolas Colsaerts
Nicolas Colsaerts	3 & 2	Kiradech Aphibarnrat
Branden Grace	Halved	Kiradech Aphibarnrat

- 1st – Grace
- 2nd – Colsaerts
- 3rd – Aphibarnrat

Pool Norman
Winner	Score	Loser
Francesco Molinari	2 & 1	Henrik Stenson
Francesco Molinari	4 & 3	Felipe Aguilar
Felipe Aguilar	3 & 1	Henrik Stenson

- 1st – Molinari
- 2nd – Aguilar
- 3rd – Stenson

Pool McCormack
Winner	Score	Loser
Carl Pettersson	4 & 3	Thorbjørn Olesen
Scott Jamieson	1 up	Carl Pettersson
Scott Jamieson	5 & 3	Thorbjørn Olesen

- 1st – Jamieson
- 2nd – Pettersson
- 3rd – Olesen

Pool Player
Winner	Score	Loser
Gonzalo Fernández-Castaño	1 up	Jamie Donaldson
Brett Rumford	5 & 3	Jamie Donaldson
Gonzalo Fernández-Castaño	3 & 2	Brett Rumford

- 1st – Fernández-Castaño
- 2nd – Rumford
- 3rd – Donaldson

== Playoffs ==
Round of 16; 18 May, morning
(Italy) Francesco Molinari	6&4
(Sweden) Carl Pettersson
(Republic of Ireland) Shane Lowry
(South Africa) Thomas Aiken	19 h
(Scotland) Scott Jamieson	1 up
(Chile) Felipe Aguilar
(Thailand) Thongchai Jaidee	21 h
(Sweden) Peter Hanson
(South Africa) Richard Sterne
(England) Chris Wood	5&3
(South Africa) Branden Grace	4&3
(Australia) Brett Rumford
(Northern Ireland) Graeme McDowell	1 up
(United States) Bo Van Pelt
(Spain) Gonzalo F'dez-Castaño
(Belgium) Nicolas Colsaerts	2 up

Quarter-finals; 18 May, afternoon
(Italy) Francesco Molinari
(South Africa) Thomas Aiken	3&2
(Scotland) Scott Jamieson
(Thailand) Thongchai Jaidee	4&3
(England) Chris Wood
(South Africa) Branden Grace	2&1
(Northern Ireland) Graeme McDowell	2&1
(Belgium) Nicolas Colsaerts

Semi-finals; 19 May, morning
(South Africa) Thomas Aiken
(Thailand) Thongchai Jaidee	3&2
(South Africa) Branden Grace
(Northern Ireland) Graeme McDowell	3&2

Final; 19 May, afternoon
(Thailand) Thongchai Jaidee
(Northern Ireland) Graeme McDowell	2&1

== Prize money breakdown ==
Place	Actual prize fund (€)	Race to Dubai fund (€)
Champion	800,000	499,999
Runner-up	400,000	333,333
Semi-finals losers x 2	200,000	168,900
Quarter-finals losers x 4	100,000	99,300
Round of 16 losers x 8	75,000	51,825
Third place in pool x 8	50,000	35,775
Total	€3,000,000	€2,269,132
