= Michael Thompson (golfer) =

American professional golfer (born 1985)

Personal information
- Full name: Michael Hayes Thompson
- Nationality: United States
- Born: April 16, 1985 (age 41) Tucson, Arizona, U.S.
- Height: 6 ft 0 in (1.83 m)
- Weight: 185 lb (84 kg; 13.2 st)
- Spouse: Rachel Thompson
- Children: 2

Career
- Sport: Golf
- College: Tulane University; University of Alabama
- Turned professional: 2008
- Current tour: PGA Tour
- Former tours: Korn Ferry Tour; Hooters Tour
- Professional wins: 4
- Highest ranking: 43 (March 10, 2013)

Number of wins by tour
- PGA Tour: 2
- Korn Ferry Tour: 1
- Other: 1

Best results in major championships
- Masters Tournament: T25: 2013
- PGA Championship: T22: 2013
- U.S. Open: T2: 2012
- The Open Championship: CUT: 2012, 2013

Michael Hayes Thompson (born April 16, 1985) is an American professional golfer who plays on the PGA Tour. He has won two tournaments on the PGA Tour, with the most recent one coming at the 2020 3M Open.

== Early life ==
Thompson attended University High School in Tucson, Arizona from 1999 to 2003. While there he won the Class 4A state team championship in 2003, and was named the Arizona High School State Player of the Year in 2002 and 2003.

== Amateur career ==
Thompson attended Tulane University two seasons until they disbanded their golf team after Hurricane Katrina. Thompson then transferred to the University of Alabama. While playing on Alabama's golf team, Thompson was the 2008 SEC Player of the Year.

Thompson was a finalist in the 2007 U.S. Amateur, but was defeated by Colt Knost 2 & 1. This earned him invitations to the 2008 Masters Tournament and the 2008 U.S. Open. He missed the cut in the Masters but was the low amateur at the U.S. Open at Torrey Pines. He scored a nine-over-par 292 to finish in 28th place. The following week he was invited to play in the Travelers Championship, where he made the cut and shot a three-under-par 277 to finish tied for 58th.

== Professional career ==
Thompson spent one week as number one in the World Amateur Golf Ranking before turning professional in July 2008. In 2010 Thompson played on the Hooters Tour, and was named the 2010 Hooters Tour Player of the Year. In the 2010 PGA Tour Q-School, Thompson finished tied for 16th, which earned him a 2011 PGA Tour card.

After earning his spot through sectional qualifying, Thompson led after the first round of the 2012 U.S. Open after shooting a four-under par round of 66, which included seven birdies, to lead by three strokes. This was the low round of the week. He followed this up with rounds of 75–74 to enter the final round six back of the leaders. Thompson then completed a three-under par round of 67 to hold the clubhouse lead at +2, until Webb Simpson bettered it by a stroke. Thompson finished tied for second with Graeme McDowell to record his best finish in a major championship. Thompson moved up over 50 places in the Official World Golf Ranking (OWGR) to 52nd with this finish.

After a number of players withdrew due to injury or personal reasons, Thompson earned entry into the 2012 Open Championship as an alternate due to his OWGR ranking. He went on to miss the cut.

Thompson earned his first PGA Tour win at the 2013 Honda Classic. The win moved Thompson to a career-high 45th in the OWGR, up from 114th before the tournament.

After 2013, Thompson only had a combined three top ten finishes. After finishing 145th in the FedEx Cup in 2016, he played in the Web.com Tour Finals and won the Albertsons Boise Open.

On July 26, 2020, Thompson won the 3M Open at TPC Twin Cities just outside of Minneapolis, Minnesota. The win gave Thompson an exempt status on the Tour for two years and spots in both the WGC-FedEx St. Jude Invitational and the PGA Championship. Prior to the win, Thompson only had one other top-10 finish in the 2019–20 PGA Tour season, finishing T8 at the RBC Heritage. He missed the cut at the Workday Charity Open two weeks before the tournament, and finished outside of the top 45 in his other two appearances on Tour once play resumed after the COVID-19 hiatus. He missed the cut in seven of his first 11 appearances in the 2019–20 season, but at the first round of the 2020 Players Championship on March 12 at Sawgrass, Florida, Thompson shot a bogey-free 68, before the tournament was cancelled and the PGA Tour took a three-month break.

== Personal life ==
Thompson attained the rank of Eagle Scout in the Boy Scouts of America while in high school. He is married to Rachel Thompson, who is a Doctor of Physical Therapy, and an Emory University graduate. She caddied for Thompson during his only win on the regular Hooters Tour. The two met while attending Tulane University together.

Thompson and his wife have together adopted two children, in 2016 and 2020 respectively.

== Awards and honors ==
- In 2002 and 2003, Thompson earned the Arizona High School State Player of the Year award
- In 2008, he was selected as the Southeastern Conference's Player of the Year

== Professional wins (4) ==
=== PGA Tour wins (2) ===
| No. | Date | Tournament | Winning score | To par | Margin of victory | Runner-up |
|---|---|---|---|---|---|---|
| 1 | Mar 3, 2013 | The Honda Classic | 67-65-70-69=271 | −9 | 2 strokes | (Australia) Geoff Ogilvy |
| 2 | Jul 26, 2020 | 3M Open | 64-66-68-67=265 | −19 | 2 strokes | (United States) Adam Long |

=== Web.com Tour wins (1) ===
Legend
Finals events (1)
Other Web.com Tour (0)

| No. | Date | Tournament | Winning score | To par | Margin of victory | Runner-up |
|---|---|---|---|---|---|---|
| 1 | Sep 18, 2016 | Albertsons Boise Open | 67-66-64-64=261 | −23 | 3 strokes | (Argentina) Miguel Ángel Carballo |

=== NGA Hooters Tour wins (1) ===
- 2010 Michelob Ultra Classic

== Results in major championships ==
Results not in chronological order in 2020.

| Tournament | 2008 | 2009 | 2010 | 2011 | 2012 | 2013 | 2014 | 2015 | 2016 | 2017 | 2018 |
|---|---|---|---|---|---|---|---|---|---|---|---|
| Masters Tournament | CUT | | | | | T25 | | | | | |
| U.S. Open | T28LA | | | | T2 | CUT | | | | | |
| The Open Championship | | | | | CUT | CUT | | | | | |
| PGA Championship | | | | | CUT | T22 | | | | | |

| Tournament | 2019 | 2020 | 2021 |
|---|---|---|---|
| Masters Tournament | | | T34 |
| PGA Championship | CUT | CUT | |
| U.S. Open | | 48 | |
| The Open Championship | | NT | |

Top 10
Did not play

LA = Low Amateur
CUT = missed the half-way cut
"T" = tied
NT = No tournament due to COVID-19 pandemic

=== Summary ===
| Tournament | Wins | 2nd | 3rd | Top-5 | Top-10 | Top-25 | Events | Cuts made |
|---|---|---|---|---|---|---|---|---|
| Masters Tournament | 0 | 0 | 0 | 0 | 0 | 1 | 3 | 2 |
| PGA Championship | 0 | 0 | 0 | 0 | 0 | 1 | 4 | 1 |
| U.S. Open | 0 | 1 | 0 | 1 | 1 | 1 | 4 | 3 |
| The Open Championship | 0 | 0 | 0 | 0 | 0 | 0 | 2 | 0 |
| Totals | 0 | 1 | 0 | 1 | 1 | 3 | 13 | 6 |

- Most consecutive cuts made – 2 (2008 U.S. Open – 2012 U.S. Open)
- Longest streak of top-10s – 1

== Results in The Players Championship ==
| Tournament | 2012 | 2013 | 2014 | 2015 | 2016 | 2017 | 2018 | 2019 | 2020 | 2021 | 2022 | 2023 |
|---|---|---|---|---|---|---|---|---|---|---|---|---|
| The Players Championship | T51 | T55 | CUT | CUT | | | CUT | 70 | C | T48 | T60 | CUT |

Did not play

CUT = missed the halfway cut
"T" indicates a tie for a place
C = Canceled after the first round due to the COVID-19 pandemic

== Results in World Golf Championships ==
Results not in chronological order before 2015.

| Tournament | 2013 | 2014 | 2015 | 2016 | 2017 | 2018 | 2019 | 2020 |
|---|---|---|---|---|---|---|---|---|
| Championship | T8 | | | | | | | |
| Match Play | | | | | | | | NT^{1} |
| Invitational | T21 | | | | | | | T57 |
| Champions | T50 | | | | | | | NT^{1} |

^{1}Cancelled due to COVID-19 pandemic

Top 10
Did not play

NT = No tournament
"T" = Tied

== U.S. national team appearances ==
Amateur

- Palmer Cup: 2008

== See also ==
- 2010 PGA Tour Qualifying School graduates
- 2015 Web.com Tour Finals graduates
- 2016 Web.com Tour Finals graduates
- 2018 Web.com Tour Finals graduates
