= Graeme McDowell =

Northern Irish professional golfer (born 1979)

Graeme McDowell MBE
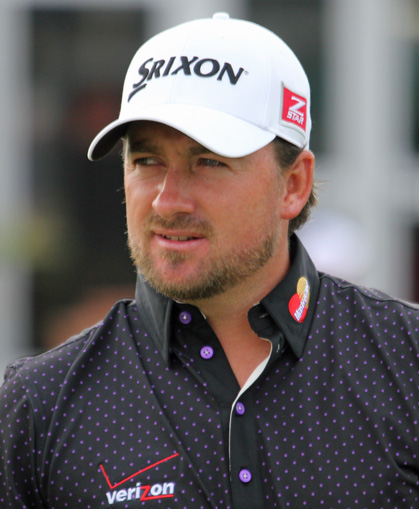
- McDowell in 2012

Personal information
- Nickname: G-Mac
- Nationality: Northern Ireland
- Born: 30 July 1979 (age 47) Portrush, County Antrim Northern Ireland
- Height: 5 ft 11 in (1.80 m)
- Weight: 168 lb (76 kg; 12.0 st)
- Spouse: Kristin Stape (m. 2013)
- Children: 3

Career
- Sport: Golf
- College: University of Alabama at Birmingham
- Turned professional: 2002
- Current tours: European Tour; Asian Tour; LIV Golf
- Former tour: PGA Tour
- Professional wins: 16
- Highest ranking: 4 (16 January 2011)

Number of wins by tour
- PGA Tour: 4
- European Tour: 11
- Asian Tour: 1
- Other: 2

Best results in major championships (wins: 1)
- Masters Tournament: T12: 2012
- PGA Championship: T10: 2009
- U.S. Open: Won: 2010
- The Open Championship: T5: 2012

Achievements and awards
- Haskins Award: 2002
- European Tour Golfer of the Year: 2010

Graeme McDowell (born 30 July 1979) is a professional golfer from Northern Ireland. He has eleven tournament victories on the European Tour, and four on the PGA Tour, including one major championship, the 2010 U.S. Open at Pebble Beach. In 2022, he joined LIV Golf. McDowell has also represented Ireland at the World Cup and he has been a member of the European Ryder Cup team on four occasions. He has appeared in the top-10 in the Official World Golf Ranking, with a highest ranking position of 4th (January to March 2011).

== Early life ==
McDowell was born on 30 July 1979 in Portrush, County Antrim, Northern Ireland, and played with Rathmore Golf Club since he was eight or nine years old. His uncle, Uel Loughery, coached him there when he was younger. At the age of 14, McDowell played senior cup for Rathmore. In his teens, he attended Coleraine Academical Institution.

McDowell studied engineering at Queen's University in Belfast, then transferred to the University of Alabama at Birmingham, where he played college golf through the spring of 2002. As a senior with the Blazers in 2002, McDowell won six of twelve college events and the Haskins Award, given to the outstanding collegiate golfer in the United States. He was a member of the Great Britain and Ireland team which retained the Walker Cup in 2001 at Sea Island, Georgia.

== Professional career ==
=== European Tour ===
McDowell turned professional in 2002, and won that season's Volvo Scandinavian Masters, which was only his fourth start on the European Tour. That win led to McDowell being given honorary life membership at the Royal Portrush Golf Club. He did not win in his second season, but in 2004 he claimed the Telecom Italia Open and finished sixth on the European Tour's Order of Merit. In 2005, he divided his time between the European and U.S. PGA Tours. McDowell was not yet a full member of the PGA Tour, but his top-50 placing in the Official World Golf Ranking ensured that he received invitations to play in many events in the United States.

McDowell managed two top-10 finishes on the PGA Tour, including a tie for second place at the Bay Hill Invitational, which enabled him to earn enough money to become fully exempt on the PGA Tour in 2006. He failed, however, to finish in the top-150 in the 2006 PGA Tour money list, and decided to return to the European Tour for 2007. In 2008, McDowell returned to the winner's enclosure by winning first the Ballantine's Championship in South Korea, and then the Barclays Scottish Open. He played in the 2008 Ryder Cup, earning 2.5 points for the European team and finished the season ranked fifth on the Order of Merit.

In June 2010, McDowell won the Celtic Manor Wales Open by three shots. This was his fifth European win.

In June 2010, McDowell won the U.S. Open at Pebble Beach, becoming the first Northern Irishman to accomplish the feat, and the first European U.S. Open winner since Tony Jacklin in 1970. McDowell was also the first player from the United Kingdom to win a major championship since Paul Lawrie won The Open Championship in 1999, and the first Northern Irishman to win a major since Fred Daly won the 1947 Open Championship. McDowell was only the second European to win the U.S. Open since 1925. He rose to number 13 in the world rankings, then a career high, and became the eighth European in the top 15. McDowell embraced his father, Kenny, on Father's Day, and almost immediately called fellow golfer Rory McIlroy to joke about a possible partnership in the 2010 Ryder Cup. He celebrated with a large crowd, including fellow golfer Pádraig Harrington, in the United States.

There were celebrations in his native Portrush as well when news of McDowell's win broke, with "the mother of all parties" planned to get underway in the town. The "famous win" set off "a brand new life" for McDowell, according to The Guardian's golf correspondent, Lawrence Donegan. The Daily Telegraph's Mark Reason opined: "The previous three tournaments in the United States have been won by Lee Westwood, Justin Rose [both English] and now McDowell. It's an unprecedented surge and America must feel like it is being invaded". McDowell's manager, Conor Ridge, accepted bookings for American TV shows, such as The Tonight Show with Jay Leno, as well as a cameo role in Entourage. Shortly after winning the U.S. Open, McDowell joined the PGA Tour and earned a five-year exemption for winning a major.

On Monday, 4 October 2010, McDowell was charged with putting to win on the 17th green of the 2010 Ryder Cup at Celtic Manor. His was the last match of the 12 player singles, with his opponent being Hunter Mahan, to win the tournament 14.5/13.5 for Europe, and it was his 5-foot putt that was conceded to give victory to Europe.

McDowell finished the 2010 season with another win at the Andalucía Valderrama Masters and was second behind Martin Kaymer in the 2010 Race to Dubai standings. On 5 December 2010, McDowell beat Tiger Woods in a playoff to win the 2010 Chevron World Challenge. McDowell and Kaymer shared the European Tour Golfer of the Year award. At the end of 2010, McDowell was ranked 6th in the world.

McDowell had a solid but unspectacular season in 2011 where he did not record a win on either of the main tours. He finished third on four occasions, three on the European Tour and once on the PGA Tour. McDowell finished the year 16th on the European Tour's Race to Dubai, his year consisting of 17 out of 18 cuts made and five top-10 finishes.

=== PGA Tour ===
In May 2011, McDowell was in contention to win the PGA Tour's flagship event, The Players Championship, but shot a final round 79 to end his chances. He earned over a million dollars on the PGA Tour but could only finish the year 73rd in the FedEx Cup standings.

McDowell opened up the year with a third-place finish at the Abu Dhabi HSBC Golf Championship on the European Tour in January. He finished two strokes behind winner Robert Rock. In March 2012, McDowell recorded his joint best finish on the PGA Tour outside of his U.S. Open win, when he finished as runner-up, five strokes behind Tiger Woods at the Arnold Palmer Invitational. This was the second time McDowell had been a runner-up on the PGA Tour. Two weeks later, McDowell had his best performance at The Masters, when he finished in a tie for 12th. He shot a final round of 68 to jump up inside the top 15. McDowell was runner up in May 2012 at the Volvo World Match Play Championship at the Finca Cortesin Golf Club, losing the final 1 down to Belgium's Nicolas Colsaerts. In a tight match, McDowell was never more than 2 down but was never in front in the match either. After the match he admitted that the better player won and that he played poorly, shooting five over for the round. Previously in the knockout stages, McDowell had beaten Richard Finch 3&2, Sergio García on the 19th hole and Rafa Cabrera-Bello 2 up.

In June 2012, the U.S. Open returned to California, when it was held at the Olympic Club in San Francisco, less than 100 miles from Pebble Beach, the site of McDowell's 2010 U.S. Open victory. Again he was in contention after rounds of 69-72-68 on the first three days had positioned him at one under for the championship. McDowell was tied for the lead going into the final day with Jim Furyk, both playing in the final group on Sunday. The second time in three years that McDowell had featured in the final group of the U.S. Open. Despite a disappointing front nine, where he found himself four over, he made several birdies on the back nine, including one on the 17th hole to trail by one shot with one hole to play. After a good drive and approach to the green, he was faced with a 25-foot putt to tie the lead and force a playoff, but narrowly missed it to the left and had to settle for a par. This led to McDowell finishing in a tie for second place with Michael Thompson, one stroke behind the champion, Webb Simpson. The following month, at the 2012 Open Championship at Royal Lytham & St Annes, McDowell was in contention on Sunday for the second consecutive major. He had shot rounds of 67-69-67 during the first three days to be at seven under par and trail leader Adam Scott by four strokes in second place with Brandt Snedeker. McDowell played in the final group on Sunday for the second consecutive major championship and third time overall, alongside Scott. He had a disappointing round of 75 (+5) and was never in contention for the championship all afternoon. His challenge was ended at the par five 11th, when he snap hooked his second shot into the trees left and had to take a penalty drop, costing him a bogey. He finished the championship in a tie for 5th with fellow European Luke Donald. It was however his best ever placing at The Open Championship. In December, he won the World Challenge, beating Keegan Bradley by three shots.

McDowell started the season on the PGA Tour at the Northern Trust Open, where he shot 73–72 to miss the cut. He played the following week at the WGC-Accenture Match Play Championship and reached the quarter-finals. It was his best ever showing at the tournament, beating Pádraig Harrington 2-up, Alex Norén in 20 holes and Shane Lowry 3&2, before losing 1-down to Jason Day in the quarter-finals.

McDowell played in The Honda Classic the week after and recorded his second consecutive top-10 with a T-9 finish. The next week he played in the final group with Tiger Woods in the WGC-Cadillac Championship and finished in a T-3 position. He missed the cut in the Masters Tournament by one stroke, bogeying the last hole. The next week he played the RBC Heritage. In the final round in stormy weather, he posted a two-under-par 69. He entered a playoff with fellow U.S. Open champion Webb Simpson. Simpson bogeyed the first hole and McDowell parred to win his first regular PGA Tour event and his first tour win since 2010.

The win moved him into 8th in the world rankings. In the 2013 Volvo World Match Play Championship, he defeated Thongchai Jaidee, 2 & 1, to win. The win moved him to the top of the Race to Dubai and 7th in the world. He missed the cut in the European Tour's flagship event, the BMW PGA Championship. In the 2013 U.S. Open he missed the cut; the event he had won in 2010. This was the first time that he had ever missed the cut in that event. In July 2013, he won the Alstom Open de France, shooting a final round of 67 to finish four shots ahead of Richard Sterne.

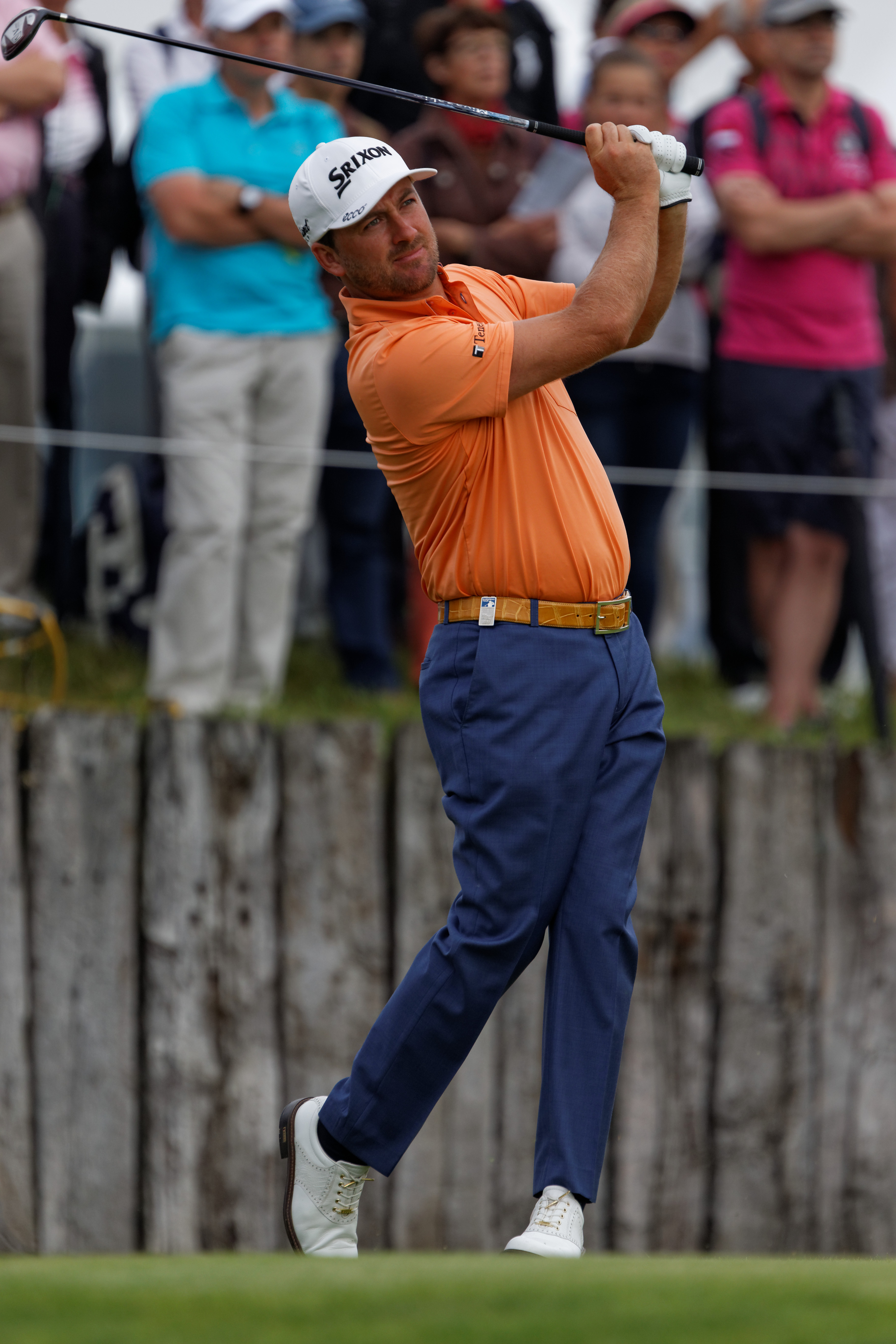
McDowell in 2014

In 2014, McDowell continued to play on both the European Tour and PGA Tour. In the WGC-Accenture Match Play Championship he made comebacks including winning the 18th in each of his first 3 matches before losing to eventual runner up Victor Dubuisson in the quarter finals.

McDowell followed this up with a top-10 finish at the second World Golf Championship of the season at the Cadillac Championship, before missing the cut at the first major of the year at the Masters.

McDowell made the cut at the U.S. Open and came close to a maiden national open win at the Irish Open where he finished in a tie for 6th.

In his next event, Alstom Open de France, he recorded his only win of the season, defending the title he won in 2013 despite going into the final round 8 shots behind Kevin Stadler.

Following this McDowell continued his good form at the Open Championship with a top-10 finish, and further top-10 finishes in his next two events at the RBC Canadian Open and the Bridgestone Invitational.

At the PGA Championship, McDowell made the cut finishing in a tie of 46th, subsequently competing in the FedEx Cup Playoffs, however he failed to progress to the year end Tour Championship finishing outside the top-30 in 56th place.

McDowell qualified to represent Europe at the 2014 Ryder Cup narrowly edging Stephen Gallacher for the final place based on Official World Golf Ranking points.

At the Ryder Cup, he formed a successful partnership with former opponent Victor Dubuisson with comfortable wins the afternoon foursomes on Friday and Saturday. In the lead match of the Sunday singles, McDowell recovered from being 3 down to Jordan Spieth to win 2&1. With these wins Europe won the Ryder Cup.

McDowell subsequently competed in the Race to Dubai Final Series events on the European Tour including a tie for third in the HSBC Champions. McDowell finished 14th in the Race to Dubai rankings on the European Tour in 2014.

McDowell endured one of his worst years as a professional during the 2015 season. In fifteen events on the PGA Tour, McDowell made only eight cuts, with just one top five finish, coming in his first tournament of the year.

In this tournament, the WGC-HSBC Champions, he held the 18, 36, and 54 hole leads and began Sunday with a one stroke lead. He shot a final round of 73 and missed a birdie putt on the final hole, which would have earned him a place in the playoff. He finished the 2015 season at 160th in the FedEx Cup standings and was the first time he had missed out on qualifying for the playoffs since 2010.

In November 2015, McDowell won his third PGA Tour title at the OHL Classic at Mayakoba. He prevailed in a sudden death playoff over Jason Bohn and Russell Knox during a Monday finish to the tournament. He won with a birdie on the first extra hole after his five iron approach grazed the edge of the cup and left him with three-foot birdie putt. Knox then could only up and down for par, whilst Bohn missed an 18-foot birdie putt to extend the playoff. McDowell said afterwards that the win came at the end of a real grind in what was one of his worst calendar years as a professional.

In the 2015–16 PGA Tour season, McDowell won $2,596,170 and finished 27th in the season-long FedEx Cup race.

In the 2016–17 PGA Tour season, McDowell only had 4 top 10 finishes and finished 136th in the FedEx Cup.

In the 2017–18 PGA Tour season, McDowell struggled again and only won $581,024 and finished 144th in the FedEx Cup. This left him with limited status on the PGA Tour for the 2018–19 season.

European Ryder Cup captain Thomas Bjørn named McDowell as a vice-captain for the European team at the 2018 Ryder Cup. In September 2018, Europe defeated the U.S. team 17½ points to 10½ at Le Golf National outside of Paris, France.

On 31 March 2019, McDowell won his fourth PGA Tour title at the Corales Puntacana Resort and Club Championship in the Dominican Republic.

On 9 June 2019, McDowell finished tied for 8th at the RBC Canadian Open and therefore qualified for the 2019 Open Championship, which was played at his home course Royal Portrush Golf Club in Northern Ireland.

On 2 February 2020, McDowell won the Saudi International with a score of 12 under par. The victory marked his first title on the European Tour since 2014 and also improved his world ranking from 104 to 47.

=== LIV Golf Series ===
On 31 May 2022, McDowell was named in the field for the first LIV Golf Invitational Series event at Centurion, near London. He resigned his membership of the PGA Tour shortly before the start of play.

McDowell played in all fourteen events as part of the 2023 LIV Golf League as part of Cleeks GC alongside Martin Kaymer, Bernd Wiesberger, and Richard Bland. He also played in seven events on the Asian Tour during the year. At the end of the LIV season, McDowell ranked 42nd in the individual standings. His contract expired and he was not offered a contract extension by his team. His best finish in the 2023 LIV Golf season was a 12th place finish at Trump National Golf Club Bedminster. On 28 November 2023, McDowell signed with Smash GC for the 2024 LIV Golf League.

In August, McDowell was suspended by LIV Golf for one tournament and fined US$125,000 for violating the circuit's anti-doping policy after using an over-the-counter decongestant medicine that included the banned substance R-methamphetamine.

== Personal life ==
McDowell comes from a mixed Catholic/Protestant family background, but was himself raised a Protestant. At the time of his 2010 U.S. Open victory he was living in a "bachelor pad" penthouse apartment in Portrush and was building a home in Lake Nona, Florida, United States. He hired interior designer Kristin Stape to work on the Lake Nona house; the pair subsequently began dating and became engaged in October 2012. They married in a small ceremony in the Bahamas in September 2013. Stape gave birth to the couple's first child, a girl, in August 2014. Their second child, a son, was born in 2016. She has a child from a previous relationship.

When quizzed on whether he'd represent Britain or Ireland at future Olympic events, McDowell stated: "I’m not bothered who I play for. I’ll be honoured to represent Britain or Ireland or both. I’m proud to play golf for Europe." On the subject of his nationality, he added: "Yes, I sit on the fence but why not? There’s no right or wrong answer. I’m always going to upset someone so why not sit on the fence?" In the run up to the 2016 Olympics, when golf was reintroduced, Rory McIlroy (representing Ireland) withdrew from the tournament, leaving McDowell with the possibility of representing Ireland as their next highest ranked player. However, McDowell ruled out this possibility by opting to not play in the Olympics. He often travels and practises with Rory McIlroy and Pádraig Harrington.

In January 2011 McDowell was photographed by Kevin Abosch for "The Face of Ireland" project.

McDowell is a devoted Manchester United fan. In the buildup to the 2011 Masters Tournament he skipped the annual par-3 contest in order to watch a UEFA Champions League clash between United and Chelsea.

McDowell is also partner in owning a restaurant, Nona Blue, that he opened outside of his neighborhood Lake Nona Golf & Country Club. Nona Blue is considered a "Modern Tavern."

== Awards and honors ==
- In 2002, McDowell was bestowed with the Haskins Award, awarded to the top college golfer in the United States.
- In 2010, McDowell shared the European Tour Golfer of the Year award with Martin Kaymer.
- He was appointed Member of the Order of the British Empire (MBE) in the 2011 New Year Honours for services to golf.
- In June 2011, McDowell received an honorary doctorate (D.Sc) from the University of Ulster for his services to golf. He received his honorary degree from the University's Chancellor, the actor James Nesbitt on its Coleraine campus and in his speech to graduates, urged them to set their goals high in their careers and trust their intuition.

== Amateur wins ==
- 1996 Ulster Boys Championship
- 1999 Irish Youths Championship
- 2000 Irish Amateur Close Championship, Irish Youths Championship, World Universities Championship, South of Ireland Championship

== Professional wins (16) ==
=== PGA Tour wins (4) ===
Legend
Major championships (1)
Other PGA Tour (3)

No.	Date	Tournament	Winning score	To par	Margin of victory	Runner(s)-up
1	20 Jun 2010	U.S. Open	71-68-71-74=284	E	1 stroke	(France) Grégory Havret
2	21 Apr 2013	RBC Heritage	71-67-68-69=275	−9	Playoff	(United States) Webb Simpson
3	16 Nov 2015	OHL Classic at Mayakoba	67-63-70-66=266	−18	Playoff	(United States) Jason Bohn, (Scotland) Russell Knox
4	31 Mar 2019	Corales Puntacana Resort and Club Championship	73-64-64-69=270	−18	1 stroke	(Canada) Mackenzie Hughes, (United States) Chris Stroud

PGA Tour playoff record (2–0)

No.	Year	Tournament	Opponent(s)	Result
1	2013	RBC Heritage	(United States) Webb Simpson	Won with par on first extra hole
2	2015	OHL Classic at Mayakoba	(United States) Jason Bohn, (Scotland) Russell Knox	Won with birdie on first extra hole

=== European Tour wins (11) ===
Legend
Major championships (1)
Other European Tour (10)

No.	Date	Tournament	Winning score	To par	Margin of victory	Runner(s)-up
1	4 Aug 2002	Volvo Scandinavian Masters	64-73-66-67=270	−14	1 stroke	(South Africa) Trevor Immelman
2	3 May 2004	Telecom Italia Open	67-65-65=197 (Note: Shortened to 54 holes due to weather.)	−19	Playoff	(France) Thomas Levet
3	16 Mar 2008	Ballantine's Championship^{1}	68-64-66-66=264	−24	Playoff	(India) Jeev Milkha Singh
4	13 Jul 2008	Barclays Scottish Open	67-70-66-68=271	−13	2 strokes	(South Africa) James Kingston
5	6 Jun 2010	Celtic Manor Wales Open	72-70-64-63=269	−15	3 strokes	(Wales) Rhys Davies
6	20 Jun 2010	U.S. Open	71-68-71-74=284	E	1 stroke	(France) Grégory Havret
7	31 Oct 2010	Andalucía Valderrama Masters	68-67-72-74=281	−3	2 strokes	(Denmark) Søren Kjeldsen, (Northern Ireland) Gareth Maybin, (Republic of Ireland) Damien McGrane
8	19 May 2013	Volvo World Match Play Championship	2 and 1			(Thailand) Thongchai Jaidee
9	7 Jul 2013	Alstom Open de France	69-69-70-67=275	−9	4 strokes	(South Africa) Richard Sterne
10	6 Jul 2014	Alstom Open de France (2)	70-69-73-67=279	−5	1 stroke	(Thailand) Thongchai Jaidee, (United States) Kevin Stadler
11	2 Feb 2020	Saudi International	64-68-66-70=268	−12	2 strokes	(United States) Dustin Johnson

^{1}Co-sanctioned by the Asian Tour and the Korean Tour

European Tour playoff record (2–1)

No.	Year	Tournament	Opponent	Result
1	2004	Telecom Italia Open	(France) Thomas Levet	Won with par on fourth extra hole
2	2004	Dunhill Links Championship	(Scotland) Stephen Gallacher	Lost to birdie on first extra hole
3	2008	Ballantine's Championship	(India) Jeev Milkha Singh	Won with birdie on third extra hole

=== Asian Tour wins (1) ===
No.	Date	Tournament	Winning score	To par	Margin of victory	Runner-up
1	16 Mar 2008	Ballantine's Championship^{1}	68-64-66-66=264	−24	Playoff	(India) Jeev Milkha Singh

^{1}Co-sanctioned by the European Tour and the Korean Tour

Asian Tour playoff record (1–0)

No.	Year	Tournament	Opponent	Result
1	2008	Ballantine's Championship	(India) Jeev Milkha Singh	Won with birdie on third extra hole

=== Other wins (2) ===
No.	Date	Tournament	Winning score	To par	Margin of victory	Runner-up
1	5 Dec 2010	Chevron World Challenge	66-69-68-69=272	−16	Playoff	(United States) Tiger Woods
2	2 Dec 2012	World Challenge (2)	69-66-68-68=271	−17	3 strokes	(United States) Keegan Bradley

Other playoff record (1–0)

No.	Year	Tournament	Opponent	Result
1	2010	Chevron World Challenge	(United States) Tiger Woods	Won with birdie on first extra hole

== Major championships ==
=== Wins (1) ===
Year	Championship	54 holes	Winning score	Margin	Runner-up
2010	U.S. Open	3 shot deficit	E (71-68-71-74=284)	1 stroke	(France) Grégory Havret

=== Results timeline ===
Results not in chronological order in 2020.

Tournament	2004	2005	2006	2007	2008	2009
Masters Tournament		CUT				T17
U.S. Open		T80	T48	T30		T18
The Open Championship	CUT	T11	T61	CUT	T19	T34
PGA Championship	CUT	CUT	T37		T15	T10

Tournament	2010	2011	2012	2013	2014	2015	2016	2017	2018
Masters Tournament	CUT	CUT	T12	CUT	CUT	T52	CUT		
U.S. Open	1	T14	T2	CUT	T28	CUT	T18	CUT	CUT
The Open Championship	T23	CUT	T5	T58	T9	T49	T63		
PGA Championship	CUT	CUT	T11	T12	T46	CUT	CUT	CUT	

Tournament	2019	2020	2021	2022	2023	2024	2025	2026
Masters Tournament		CUT						
PGA Championship	T29	CUT						
U.S. Open	T16	CUT						CUT
The Open Championship	T57	NT						

Win
Top 10
Did not play

CUT = missed the half-way cut
"T" = tied
NT = no tournament due to COVID-19 pandemic

=== Summary ===
Tournament	Wins	2nd	3rd	Top-5	Top-10	Top-25	Events	Cuts made
Masters Tournament	0	0	0	0	0	2	10	3
PGA Championship	0	0	0	0	1	4	15	7
U.S. Open	1	1	0	2	2	6	16	10
The Open Championship	0	0	0	1	2	5	14	11
Totals	1	1	0	3	5	17	55	31

- Most consecutive cuts made – 6 (2008 Open Championship – 2009 PGA)
- Longest streak of top-10s – 2 (2012 U.S. Open – 2012 Open Championship)

== Results in The Players Championship ==
Tournament	2005	2006	2007	2008	2009
The Players Championship	T40				78

Tournament	2010	2011	2012	2013	2014	2015	2016	2017	2018	2019
The Players Championship	T26	T33	CUT	CUT	T62	T56	T9	T69		

Tournament	2020	2021
The Players Championship	C	CUT

Top 10
Did not play

CUT = missed the halfway cut
"T" indicates a tie for a place
C = Cancelled after the first round due to the COVID-19 pandemic

== Results in World Golf Championships ==
Results not in chronological order before 2015.

Tournament	2002	2003	2004	2005	2006	2007	2008	2009	2010	2011	2012	2013	2014	2015	2016	2017	2018	2019
Championship			T43	T6			T48	T66	T6	T42	T13	T3	T9	T56	T28			
Match Play				R32	R64			R64	R64	R16	R64	QF	QF	T52	T38			
Invitational	T52			WD			T56	T45	T22	T65	T24	T40	T8	T17				
Champions									T34	3	T42	3	T3					

Tournament	2020
Championship	T69
Match Play	NT^{1}
Invitational	T35
Champions	NT^{1}

^{1}Cancelled due to COVID-19 pandemic

Top 10
Did not play

WD = Withdrew
QF, R16, R32, R64 = Round in which player lost in match play
NT = no tournament
"T" = tied
Note that the HSBC Champions did not become a WGC event until 2009.

== European Tour professional career summary ==
Year	Starts	Cuts made	Wins	2nd	3rd	Top 10	Top 25	Earnings (€)	Money list rank
2002	12	8	1	0	0	0	1	411,578.27	56
2003	23	12	0	0	0	1	5	221,909.08	96
2004	31	24	1	2	2	4	6	1,648,862.38	6
2005	18	13	0	0	0	1	6	588,674.84	34
2006	17	12	0	0	0	2	1	437,801.82	58
2007	26	18	0	1	0	4	5	787,081.33	37
2008	28	22	2	0	1	5	9	1,859,346.26	5
2009	23	20	0	0	0	2	12	848,571.36	33
2010	24	21	3	0	2	4	7	3,077,681.66	2
2011	18	14	0	0	3	2	4	1,230,461.34	16
2012	16	15	0	2	1	1	7	1,847,420.08	9
2013	14	10	2	0	2	1	2	2,143,133.52	4

== Team appearances ==
Amateur

- European Boys' Team Championship (representing Ireland): 1997
- European Youths' Team Championship (representing Ireland): 2000
- Palmer Cup: (representing Great Britain & Ireland): 2000 (winners), 2001
- European Amateur Team Championship (representing Ireland): 2001
- Walker Cup (representing Great Britain & Ireland): 2001 (winners)

Professional

- Seve Trophy: (representing Great Britain & Ireland): 2005 (winners), 2009 (winners)
- Royal Trophy (representing Europe): 2006 (winners)
- Ryder Cup (representing Europe): 2008, 2010 (winners), 2012 (winners), 2014 (winners)
  - Record: 15 matches, 9 points (60% Point Percentage)
  - All Formats (W–L–H): 8–5–2 = 9 pts
    - Singles: 3–1–0 = 3 pts
    - Foursomes: 4–2–2 = 5 pts
    - Fourballs: 1–2–0 = 1 pt
- World Cup (representing Ireland): 2008, 2009, 2011, 2013, 2016
- EurAsia Cup (representing Europe): 2014

== See also ==
- List of golfers with most European Tour wins
