= 2013 BMW PGA Championship =

Tournament information
- Dates: 23–26 May 2013
- Location: Surrey, England; 51.40°N 0.59°W
- Course: Wentworth Club
- Tour: European Tour

Statistics
- Par: 72
- Length: 7,302 yards (6,677 m)
- Field: 150 players, 71 after cut
- Cut: 146 (+2)
- Prize fund: €4,750,000
- Winner's share: €791,660

Champion
- (Italy) Matteo Manassero
- 278 (−10)

Location map
- Location in England Location in Surrey

The 2013 BMW PGA Championship was the 59th edition of the BMW PGA Championship, an annual golf tournament on the European Tour, contested 23–26 May at Wentworth Club in Surrey, England. Matteo Manassero of Italy won the tournament on the fourth hole of a sudden-death playoff with Simon Khan and Marc Warren.

== Course layout ==
Wentworth Club, West Course
Tee	Rating/Slope	1	2	3	4	5	6	7	8	9	Out	10	11	12	13	14	15	16	17	18	In	Total
Yardage	n/a	473	154	465	552	203	418	396	391	449	3,501	184	416	531	470	179	489	383	610	539	3,801	7,302
Par		4	3	4	5	3	4	4	4	4	35	3	4	5	4	3	4	4	5	5	37	72

== Round summaries ==
=== First round ===
Thursday, 23 May 2013
Friday, 24 May 2013

Place	Player	Score	To par
1	(South Africa) James Kingston	66	−6
2	(Finland) Mikko Ilonen	67	−5
T3	(Spain) Gonzalo Fernández-Castaño	68	−4
T3	(Scotland) Scott Henry	68	−4
T3	(Austria) Martin Wiegele	68	−4
T5	(Denmark) Thomas Bjørn	69	−3
T5	(Spain) Alejandro Cañizares	69	−3
T5	(South Africa) George Coetzee	69	−3
T5	(England) Simon Khan	69	−3
T5	(Italy) Matteo Manassero	69	−3
T5	(Scotland) Marc Warren	69	−3

=== Second round ===
Friday, 24 May 2013

Place	Player	Score	To par
1	(Italy) Francesco Molinari	70-68=138	−6
T2	(Spain) Alejandro Cañizares	69-70=139	−5
T2	(South Africa) George Coetzee	69-70=139	−5
T2	(England) Mark Foster	70-69=139	−5
T2	(Scotland) Marc Warren	69-70=139	−5
T6	(Italy) Matteo Manassero	69-71=140	−4
T6	(England) Eddie Pepperell	71-69=140	−4
T8	(South Africa) Ernie Els	72-69=141	−3
T8	(Sweden) Niclas Fasth	70-71=141	−3
T8	(France) Grégory Havret	70-71=141	−3
T8	(England) Simon Khan	69-72=141	−3
T8	(Republic of Ireland) Shane Lowry	70-71=141	−3
T8	(England) Lee Westwood	70-71=141	−3

=== Third round ===
Saturday, 25 May 2013

Place	Player	Score	To par
1	(Spain) Alejandro Cañizares	69-70-68=207	−9
2	(England) Lee Westwood	70-71-67=208	−8
T3	(Italy) Matteo Manassero	69-71-69=209	−7
T3	(Scotland) Marc Warren	69-70-70=209	−7
5	(Republic of Ireland) Shane Lowry	70-71-69=210	−6
T6	(England) Richard Bland	71-71-69=211	−5
T6	(England) Mark Foster	70-69-72=211	−5
T6	(Spain) Sergio García	72-71-68=211	−5
T6	(Spain) Pablo Larrazábal	71-73-67=211	−5
T6	(Italy) Edoardo Molinari	71-71-69=211	−5
T6	(Italy) Francesco Molinari	70-68-73=211	−5
T6	(England) Eddie Pepperell	71-69-71=211	−5
T6	(England) Lee Slattery	71-71-69=211	−5

=== Fourth round ===
Sunday, 26 May 2013

Place	Player	Score	To par	Money (€)
T1	(England) Simon Khan	69-72-71-66=278	−10	Playoff
T1	(Italy) Matteo Manassero	69-71-69-69=278	−10	Playoff
T1	(Scotland) Marc Warren	69-70-70-69=278	−10	Playoff
T4	(Spain) Alejandro Cañizares	69-70-68-72=279	−9	219,450
T4	(Spain) Miguel Ángel Jiménez	76-69-67-67=279	−9	219,450
T6	(South Africa) Ernie Els	72-69-72-67=280	−8	142,500
T6	(South Africa) James Kingston	66-77-69-68=280	−8	142,500
T6	(England) Eddie Pepperell	71-69-71-69=280	−8	142,500
T9	(Italy) Francesco Molinari	70-68-73-70=281	−7	96,267
T9	(Scotland) Richie Ramsay	71-75-66-69=281	−7	96,267
T9	(England) Lee Westwood	70-71-67-73=281	−7	96,267

=== Playoff ===
Sunday, 26 May 2013

Place	Player	Score	Money (€)
1	(Italy) Matteo Manassero	4-5-4-4	791,660
T2	(England) Simon Khan	4-5-4-6	412,560
T2	(Scotland) Marc Warren	C	412,560
