= 2010 WGC-HSBC Champions =

Coordinates: 31.110105°N 121.216407°E

Tournament information
- Dates: 4–7 November 2010
- Location: Shanghai, China
- Course(s): Sheshan Golf Club
- Tour(s): Asian Tour; European Tour; PGA Tour (unofficial)

Statistics
- Par: 72
- Length: 7,266 yards (6,644 m)
- Field: 78 players
- Cut: None
- Prize fund: $7,000,000
- Winner's share: $1,200,000

Champion
- (Italy) Francesco Molinari
- 269 (−19)

The 2010 WGC-HSBC Champions was a golf tournament contested from 4–7 November 2010 at the Sheshan Golf Club in Shanghai, China. It was the second WGC-HSBC Champions tournament, and the fourth of four World Golf Championships events held in 2010. It was won by Francesco Molinari of Italy who completed a wire-to-wire one stroke victory over Lee Westwood to win his first WGC event.

== Field ==
The following is a list of players for the 2010 WGC-HSBC Champions. Players who have qualified from multiple categories are listed in the first category in which they are eligible. The numbers of other qualifying categories are in parentheses next to the player's name.

1. Winners of the four major championships and The Players Championship

Tim Clark, Martin Kaymer (5,12), Graeme McDowell (5,12), Phil Mickelson (2,12), Louis Oosthuizen (5,12)

2. Winners of the previous four World Golf Championships

Ernie Els (3,12), Hunter Mahan (3,12), Ian Poulter (12)

3. Winners of the 23 top rated PGA Tour events (35 events met rating)

Ben Crane, Anthony Kim (12), Rory McIlroy (12), Ryan Palmer, Camilo Villegas, Lee Westwood (5,12)

- Qualified but did not play: Jonathan Byrd, Jason Day, Jim Furyk (12), Charley Hoffman, Dustin Johnson (12), Zach Johnson (12), Matt Kuchar (12), Geoff Ogilvy, Justin Rose (12), Steve Stricker (12), Bubba Watson (12)

4. Top 5 available players from the FedEx Cup points list

Paul Casey (12), Luke Donald (5,12), Retief Goosen (12), Nick Watney, K. J. Choi

- Qualified but did not play: Martin Laird

5. Winners of the 23 top rated European Tour events (25 events met rating)

Fredrik Andersson Hed, Ross Fisher, Richard Green, Peter Hanson, David Horsey, Miguel Ángel Jiménez, Richard S. Johnson, Robert Karlsson, Simon Khan, Matteo Manassero, Edoardo Molinari (8,12), Álvaro Quirós, Yang Yong-eun

6. Top 5 available players from the Race to Dubai

Rhys Davies, Pádraig Harrington (12), Francesco Molinari, Charl Schwartzel (9), Danny Willett

7. Nine players - winners of the top rated Asian Tour events, remainder from Order of Merit (4 events met rating)

Kiradech Aphibarnrat (OoM), Grégory Bourdy, Andrew Dodt, Marcus Fraser, Tetsuji Hiratsuka (OoM), Pariya Junhasavasdikul (OoM), Mardan Mamat (OoM), Noh Seung-yul, Thaworn Wiratchant (OoM)

8. Five players - winners of the top rated Japan Golf Tour events, remainder from Order of Merit (21 events met rating)

Hiroyuki Fujita (OoM), Kim Kyung-tae, Shigeki Maruyama, Michio Matsumura (OoM), Katsumasa Miyamoto

- Qualified but did not play: Yasuharu Imano

9. Five players - winners of the top rated Sunshine Tour events, remainder from Order of Merit (4 events met rating)

Darren Fichardt (OoM), Anders Hansen (OoM), Pablo Martín, Richie Ramsay, Jaco van Zyl (OoM)

10. Five players - winners of the top rated PGA Tour of Australasia events, remainder from Order of Merit (3 events met rating)

Robert Allenby (12), Alistair Presnell (OoM), Adam Scott, Michael Sim (OoM), Tiger Woods (12)

11. Four players from China

Li Chao, Liang Wenchong, Wu Kangchun, Yuan Hao

12. Any players, not included in above categories, in the top 25 of the OWGR on September 27, 2010

- Qualified but did not play: Sean O'Hair

13. If needed to fill the field of 78 players, winners of additional tournaments, ordered by field strength (14 from PGA Tour, 4 from European Tour, 16 from Japan Golf Tour), alternating with those players ranked after the top 25 in OWGR on September 27, 2010

Players in bold were added to the field through this category. Players listed in "()" already qualified in a previous category. Players listed with their ~~name stricken~~ did not play.

| Tournament winners | | From OWGR |
| Tournament | Winner | Ranked player |
|---|---|---|
| 2010 Zurich Classic | **Jason Bohn** | (Miguel Ángel Jiménez) |
| 2010 RBC Canadian Open | **Carl Pettersson** | (Ross Fisher) |
| 2010 John Deere Classic | ~~(Steve Stricker)~~ | (Camilo Villegas) |
| 2010 Wyndham Championship | **Arjun Atwal** | (Tim Clark) |
| 2010 Greenbrier Classic | **Stuart Appleby** | (Nick Watney) |
| 2009 Children's Miracle Network Cl. | ~~Stephen Ames~~ | ~~(Geoff Ogilvy)~~ |
| 2010 Bob Hope Classic | **Bill Haas** | (Francesco Molinari) |
| 2010 McGladrey Classic | **Heath Slocum** | **Rickie Fowler** |
| 2010 Turning Stone Resort Ch. | **Bill Lunde** | (Charl Schwartzel) |
| 2010 Frys.com Open | ~~Rocco Mediate~~ | ~~Stewart Cink~~ |
| 2010 Valero Texas Open | (Adam Scott) | (Adam Scott) |
| 2010 The Crowns | **Ryo Ishikawa** | ~~Lucas Glover~~ |
| 2010 Bridgestone Open | **Yuta Ikeda** | **Henrik Stenson** |
| 2010 Viking Classic | (Bill Haas) | ~~(Jason Day)~~ |
| 2010 Diamond Cup Golf | (Kim Kyung-tae) | (Robert Karlsson) |
| 2010 Asia-Pacific Panasonic Open | **Brendan Jones** | (Yang Yong-eun) |
| 2010 Coca-Cola Tokai Classic | (Michio Matsumura) | (Peter Hanson) |
| 2010 Fujisankei Classic | (Ryo Ishikawa) | (K. J. Choi) |
| 2010 Mizuno Open | **Shunsuke Sonoda** | |

== Round summaries ==
=== First round ===
| Place | Player | Score | To par |
|---|---|---|---|
| 1 | (Italy) Francesco Molinari | 65 | −7 |
| 2 | (England) Lee Westwood | 66 | −6 |
| T3 | (Japan) Yuta Ikeda | 67 | −5 |
| T3 | (South Korea) Noh Seung-yul | 67 | −5 |
| T3 | (Sweden) Henrik Stenson | 67 | −5 |
| T6 | (England) Luke Donald | 68 | −4 |
| T6 | (Spain) Pablo Martín | 68 | −4 |
| T6 | (United States) Tiger Woods | 68 | −4 |
| T9 | (Sweden) Fredrik Andersson Hed | 69 | −3 |
| T9 | (England) Ross Fisher | 69 | −3 |
| T9 | (United States) Phil Mickelson | 69 | −3 |
| T9 | (Japan) Katsumasa Miyamoto | 69 | −3 |
| T9 | (South Africa) Louis Oosthuizen | 69 | −3 |
| T9 | (United States) Ryan Palmer | 69 | −3 |
| T9 | (Scotland) Richie Ramsay | 69 | −3 |
| T9 | (Australia) Adam Scott | 69 | −3 |
| T9 | (South Korea) Yang Yong-eun | 69 | −3 |

=== Second round ===
| Place | Player | Score | To par |
|---|---|---|---|
| 1 | (Italy) Francesco Molinari | 65-70=135 | −9 |
| 2 | (England) Lee Westwood | 66-70=136 | −8 |
| T3 | (South Africa) Ernie Els | 72-65=137 | −7 |
| T3 | (Scotland) Richie Ramsay | 69-68=137 | −7 |
| T3 | (South Africa) Jaco van Zyl | 71-66=137 | −7 |
| 6 | (England) Luke Donald | 68-70=138 | −6 |
| T7 | (England) Ross Fisher | 69-70=139 | −5 |
| T7 | (South Korea) Noh Seung-yul | 67-72=139 | −5 |
| T9 | (Australia) Robert Allenby | 72-68=140 | −4 |
| T9 | (Sweden) Fredrik Andersson Hed | 69-71=140 | −4 |
| T9 | (Australia) Richard Green | 72-68=140 | −4 |
| T9 | (Republic of Ireland) Pádraig Harrington | 70-70=140 | −4 |
| T9 | (Sweden) Richard S. Johnson | 70-70=140 | −4 |
| T9 | (United States) Phil Mickelson | 69-71=140 | −4 |
| T9 | (England) Ian Poulter | 70-70=140 | −4 |
| T9 | (United States) Nick Watney | 72-68=140 | −4 |
| T9 | (United States) Tiger Woods | 68-72=140 | −4 |

=== Third round ===
| Place | Player | Score | To par |
|---|---|---|---|
| 1 | (Italy) Francesco Molinari | 65-70-67=202 | −14 |
| 2 | (England) Lee Westwood | 66-70-67=203 | −13 |
| 3 | (England) Luke Donald | 68-70-68=206 | −10 |
| T4 | (South Africa) Ernie Els | 72-65-71=208 | −8 |
| T4 | (England) Ross Fisher | 69-70-69=208 | −8 |
| T4 | (Scotland) Richie Ramsay | 69-68-71=208 | −8 |
| 7 | (South Africa) Jaco van Zyl | 71-66-72=209 | −7 |
| T8 | (Republic of Ireland) Pádraig Harrington | 70-70-70=210 | −6 |
| T8 | (South Korea) Noh Seung-yul | 67-72-71=210 | −6 |
| T10 | (Sweden) Fredrik Andersson Hed | 69-71-71=211 | −5 |
| T10 | (England) Paul Casey | 73-71-67=211 | −5 |
| T10 | (South Africa) Charl Schwartzel | 74-70-67=211 | −5 |

=== Final round ===
| Place | Player | Score | To par | Money ($) |
|---|---|---|---|---|
| 1 | (Italy) Francesco Molinari | 65-70-67-67=269 | −19 | 1,200,000 |
| 2 | (England) Lee Westwood | 66-70-67-67=270 | −18 | 675,000 |
| T3 | (England) Luke Donald | 68-70-68-73=279 | −9 | 372,500 |
| T3 | (Scotland) Richie Ramsay | 69-68-71-71=279 | −9 | 372,500 |
| 5 | (Northern Ireland) Rory McIlroy | 71-71-71-67=280 | −8 | 250,000 |
| T6 | (Sweden) Fredrik Andersson Hed | 69-71-71-70=281 | −7 | 145,714 |
| T6 | (England) Paul Casey | 73-71-67-70=281 | −7 | 145,714 |
| T6 | (South Africa) Ernie Els | 72-65-71-73=281 | −7 | 145,714 |
| T6 | (South Africa) Retief Goosen | 70-74-69-68=281 | −7 | 145,714 |
| T6 | (Australia) Richard Green | 72-68-73-68=281 | −7 | 145,714 |
| T6 | (Sweden) Peter Hanson | 73-69-70-69=281 | −7 | 145,714 |
| T6 | (United States) Tiger Woods | 68-72-73-68=281 | −7 | 145,714 |

==== Scorecard ====
| Hole | 1 | 2 | 3 | 4 | 5 | 6 | 7 | 8 | 9 | 10 | 11 | 12 | 13 | 14 | 15 | 16 | 17 | 18 |
|---|---|---|---|---|---|---|---|---|---|---|---|---|---|---|---|---|---|---|
| Par | 4 | 5 | 4 | 3 | 4 | 3 | 4 | 5 | 4 | 4 | 4 | 3 | 4 | 5 | 4 | 4 | 3 | 5 |
| (Italy) Molinari | −14 | −15 | −16 | −16 | −17 | −17 | −17 | −18 | −18 | −18 | −18 | −18 | −18 | −18 | −18 | −19 | −19 | −19 |
| (England) Westwood | −13 | −13 | −14 | −14 | −15 | −15 | −15 | −16 | −16 | −17 | −17 | −17 | −17 | −17 | −17 | −17 | −17 | −18 |
| (England) Donald | −10 | −10 | −10 | −9 | −9 | −8 | −8 | −9 | −8 | −8 | −8 | −8 | −8 | −8 | −8 | −9 | −9 | −9 |
| (Scotland) Ramsay | −7 | −7 | −7 | −7 | −8 | −8 | −8 | −8 | −8 | −9 | −9 | −9 | −9 | −10 | −10 | −10 | −9 | −9 |
| (Northern Ireland) McIlroy | −4 | −5 | −6 | −6 | −6 | −6 | −7 | −8 | −7 | −6 | −6 | −6 | −6 | −7 | −7 | −8 | −8 | −8 |

Cumulative tournament scores, relative to par

| Birdie | Bogey |
