= 2010 European Tour =

Golf tour season

2010 European Tour season
- Duration: 10 December 2009 – 28 November 2010
- Number of official events: 48
- Most wins: (Germany) Martin Kaymer (4)
- Race to Dubai: (Germany) Martin Kaymer
- Golfer of the Year: (Germany) Martin Kaymer and (Northern Ireland) Graeme McDowell (Note: Kaymer and McDowell shared the Golfer of the Year award.)
- Players' Player of the Year: (Germany) Martin Kaymer
- Sir Henry Cotton Rookie of the Year: (Italy) Matteo Manassero

The 2010 European Tour was the 39th season of the European Tour, the main professional golf tour in Europe since its inaugural season in 1972.

== Changes for 2010 ==
There were many changes from the 2009 season, including six new tournaments; they were the Africa Open in South Africa, the returning Avantha Masters in India which had been cancelled in 2009, (Note: The Avantha Masters is considered a continuation of the Indian Masters by the European Tour but not by the Asian Tour.) the Trophée Hassan II in Morocco, the Iberdrola Open Cala Millor Mallorca and the Andalucía Valderrama Masters in Spain, and the Vivendi Cup in France. Lost from the schedule were the European Open, the Mercedes-Benz Championship, the Johnnie Walker Classic, the Australian Masters, the Indonesia Open and the Volvo World Match Play Championship. There were also three fewer tournaments due to a partial realignment of the schedule with the calendar.

== Schedule ==
The following table lists official events during the 2010 season.

Date	Tournament	Host country	Purse	Winner (Note: The number in brackets after each winner's name is the number of European Tour events they had won up to and including that tournament. This information is only shown for European Tour members and are inclusive of the three United States-based major championships which were included on the schedule for the first time in 1998, with earlier editions having retrospectively been recognised as official tour wins.)	OWGR points	Other tours (Note: AFR − Sunshine Tour; ASA − Asian Tour; CHA − Challenge Tour; KOR − Korean Tour; ONE − OneAsia Tour.)	Notes
13 Dec	Alfred Dunhill Championship	South Africa	€1,000,000	(Spain) Pablo Martín (2)	20	AFR	
20 Dec	South African Open Championship	South Africa	€1,000,000	(Scotland) Richie Ramsay (1)	32	AFR (Note: Sunshine Tour flagship event)	
10 Jan	Africa Open	South Africa	€1,000,000	(South Africa) Charl Schwartzel (4)	20	AFR	New to European Tour
17 Jan	Joburg Open	South Africa	€1,300,000	(South Africa) Charl Schwartzel (5)	22	AFR	
24 Jan	Abu Dhabi Golf Championship	UAE	US$2,000,000	(Germany) Martin Kaymer (5)	54		
31 Jan	Commercialbank Qatar Masters	Qatar	US$2,500,000	(Sweden) Robert Karlsson (10)	54		
7 Feb	Omega Dubai Desert Classic	UAE	US$2,500,000	(Spain) Miguel Ángel Jiménez (16)	50		
14 Feb	Avantha Masters	India	€1,500,000	(Australia) Andrew Dodt (1)	20	ASA	Returning tournament
21 Feb	WGC-Accenture Match Play Championship	United States	US$8,500,000	(England) Ian Poulter (9)	74		World Golf Championship
7 Mar	Maybank Malaysian Open	Malaysia	US$2,000,000	(South Korea) Noh Seung-yul (1)	24	ASA	
14 Mar	WGC-CA Championship	United States	US$8,500,000	(South Africa) Ernie Els (25)	74		World Golf Championship
21 Mar	Trophée Hassan II	Morocco	€1,300,000	(Wales) Rhys Davies (1)	24		New to European Tour
28 Mar	Open de Andalucía de Golf	Spain	€1,000,000	(South Africa) Louis Oosthuizen (1)	24		
11 Apr	Madeira Islands Open BPI - Portugal	Portugal	€700,000	(England) James Morrison (1)	24		
11 Apr	Masters Tournament	United States	US$7,500,000	(United States) Phil Mickelson (n/a)	100		Major championship
18 Apr	Volvo China Open	China	US$2,500,000	(South Korea) Yang Yong-eun (3)	28	ONE	
25 Apr	Ballantine's Championship	South Korea	€2,200,000	(Australia) Marcus Fraser (2)	38	ASA, KOR	
2 May	Open de España	Spain	€2,000,000	(Spain) Álvaro Quirós (4)	24		
9 May	BMW Italian Open	Italy	€1,300,000	(Sweden) Fredrik Andersson Hed (1)	24		
16 May	Iberdrola Open Cala Millor Mallorca	Spain	€800,000	(Sweden) Peter Hanson (3)	24		New tournament
23 May	BMW PGA Championship	England	€4,500,000	(England) Simon Khan (2)	64		Flagship event
30 May	Madrid Masters	Spain	€1,500,000	(England) Luke Donald (3)	36		
6 Jun	Celtic Manor Wales Open	Wales	£1,800,000	(Northern Ireland) Graeme McDowell (5)	38		
13 Jun	Estoril Open de Portugal	Portugal	€1,000,000	(Denmark) Thomas Bjørn (10)	24		
20 Jun	Saint-Omer Open	France	€600,000	(Austria) Martin Wiegele (1)	18	CHA	
20 Jun	U.S. Open	United States	US$7,500,000	(Northern Ireland) Graeme McDowell (6)	100		Major championship
27 Jun	BMW International Open	Germany	€2,000,000	(England) David Horsey (1)	38		
4 Jul	Alstom Open de France	France	€3,000,000	(Spain) Miguel Ángel Jiménez (17)	50		
11 Jul	Barclays Scottish Open	Scotland	£3,000,000	(Italy) Edoardo Molinari (1)	52		
18 Jul	The Open Championship	Scotland	£4,800,000	(South Africa) Louis Oosthuizen (2)	100		Major championship
25 Jul	Nordea Scandinavian Masters	Sweden	€1,600,000	(Sweden) Richard S. Johnson (2)	26		
1 Aug	3 Irish Open	Ireland	€3,000,000	(England) Ross Fisher (4)	32		
8 Aug	WGC-Bridgestone Invitational	United States	US$8,500,000	(United States) Hunter Mahan (n/a)	76		World Golf Championship
15 Aug	PGA Championship	United States	US$7,500,000	(Germany) Martin Kaymer (6)	100		Major championship
22 Aug	Czech Open	Czech Republic	€2,000,000	(Sweden) Peter Hanson (4)	24		
29 Aug	Johnnie Walker Championship at Gleneagles	Scotland	£1,400,000	(Italy) Edoardo Molinari (2)	30		
5 Sep	Omega European Masters	Switzerland	€2,000,000	(Spain) Miguel Ángel Jiménez (18)	30	ASA	
12 Sep	KLM Open	Netherlands	€1,800,000	(Germany) Martin Kaymer (7)	32		
19 Sep	Austrian Golf Open	Austria	€750,000	(Spain) José Manuel Lara (2)	24		
26 Sep	Vivendi Cup	France	€1,250,000	(England) John Parry (1)	24		New tournament
10 Oct	Alfred Dunhill Links Championship	Scotland	US$5,000,000	(Germany) Martin Kaymer (8)	48		Pro-Am
17 Oct	Portugal Masters	Portugal	€3,000,000	(Australia) Richard Green (3)	34		
24 Oct	Castelló Masters Costa Azahar	Spain	€2,000,000	(Italy) Matteo Manassero (1)	24		
31 Oct	Andalucía Valderrama Masters	Spain	€3,000,000	(Northern Ireland) Graeme McDowell (7)	38		New tournament
7 Nov	WGC-HSBC Champions	China	US$7,000,000	(Italy) Francesco Molinari (2)	68		World Golf Championship
14 Nov	Barclays Singapore Open	Singapore	US$6,000,000	(Australia) Adam Scott (7)	48	ASA	
21 Nov	UBS Hong Kong Open	Hong Kong	US$2,500,000	(England) Ian Poulter (10)	38	ASA	
28 Nov	Dubai World Championship	UAE	US$7,500,000	(Sweden) Robert Karlsson (11)	58		Tour Championship

=== Unofficial events ===
The following events were sanctioned by the European Tour, but did not carry official money, nor were wins official.

Date	Tournament	Host country	Purse	Winner(s)	OWGR points	Notes
6 Jul	J. P. McManus Pro-Am	Ireland	n/a	(Northern Ireland) Darren Clarke	n/a	Pro-Am
4 Oct	Ryder Cup	Wales	n/a	Team Europe	n/a	Team event

== Location of tournaments ==
Location of official tournaments of the 2010 European Tour in Europe.
Major Championship
Flagship event
Regular event
Location of official tournaments of the 2010 European Tour outside Europe.
Major Championship
World Golf Championship
Tour Championship
Regular event

South Africa
United Arab Emirates

== Race to Dubai ==
The Race to Dubai was based on prize money won during the season, calculated in Euros.

Pos.	Player	Majors				WGCs				Principal events		Top 10s in other ET events									Tmts	Money		
Pos.	Player	Mas	USO	Opn	PGA	WGC MP	WGC CA	WGC Inv	WGC Cha	BMW PGA	Dub	1	2	3	4	5	6	7	8	9	Tmts	Reg. (€)	Bon. ($)	Total (€)
1	(Germany) Kaymer	CUT	T8	T7	1st	T17	T3	T22	T30	CUT	T13	1st	T4	T6	1st	1st	T10				22	3,368,592	1,500,000	4,461,011
2	(Northern Ireland) McDowell	CUT	1st	T23	CUT	T33	T6	T22	T34	T28	T13	T8	T4	1st	T3	1st	T3	5th			24	3,077,682	1,125,000	3,896,996
3	(England) Westwood	2nd	T16	2nd	•	T17	T30	WD	2nd	T10	T3	T3	2nd								14	2,676,213	750,000	3,222,423
4	(England) Poulter	T10	T47	T60	WD	1st	T37	T65	T13	CUT	2nd	2nd	T6	1st							15	2,590,041	600,000	3,027,008
5	(Italy) F. Molinari	T30	CUT	CUT	T33	T33	T14	T39	1st	T17	T6	T10	T4	3rd	T2	T4	8th	T3	T8	T2	27	2,417,346	525,000	2,799,692
6	(Sweden) Karlsson	T43	T27	T14	T16	T17	2nd	T65	T34	T13	1st	1st	7th	T2							21	1,968,760	450,000	2,296,486
7	(South Africa) Els	T18	3rd	CUT	T18	T17	1st	T22	T6	T34	T28	T9									15	1,961,192	412,500	2,261,607
8	(South Africa) Schwartzel	T30	T16	T14	T18	T9	2nd	T58	T16	T17	T21	2nd	1st	1st	8th	T5	T9				24	1,934,861	375,000	2,207,965
9	(Spain) Jiménez	T12	CUT	T27	CUT	T33	T63	T22	T41	CUT	T48	1st	8th	1st	T7	T3	1st	T7	T8		29	1,933,624	337,500	2,179,418
10	(South Africa) Oosthuizen	CUT	CUT	1st	CUT	•	•	T9	T72	CUT	T13	5th	2nd	1st	T4	T4					22	1,852,279	300,000	2,070,763
11	(Italy) E. Molinari	CUT	T47	T27	T33	T33	61st	T55	T41	CUT	T41	T4	T4	T4	1st	3rd	1st	2nd			28	1,818,164	262,500	2,009,337
12	(England) Casey	CUT	T40	T3	T12	2nd	T6	T22	T6	T17	T6	T5									14	1,711,332	243,750	1,888,850
13	(Northern Ireland) McIlroy	CUT	CUT	T3	T3	T17	T65	T9	5th	T48	5th	3rd	T6	4th	6th						16	1,657,187	225,000	1,821,050
14	(Spain) Quirós	CUT	CUT	T11	CUT	T33	T6	T39	T53	CUT	T3	2nd	T6	1st	T10	T5					25	1,600,048	206,250	1,750,255
15	(England) Donald	CUT	T47	T11	CUT	T9	T26	T46	T3	T2	T9	1	3rd								13	1,541,520	187,500	1,678,072

Win
Top 10
Made cut
Missed cut
Withdrew
• Did not play

== Awards ==
Award	Winner(s)	Ref.
Golfer of the Year	(Germany) Martin Kaymer (Northern Ireland) Graeme McDowell	
Players' Player of the Year	(Germany) Martin Kaymer	
Sir Henry Cotton Rookie of the Year	(Italy) Matteo Manassero	

== See also ==
- 2010 in golf
- 2010 European Senior Tour
