= 2010 WGC-Bridgestone Invitational =

Coordinates: 41.008°N 81.508°W

Tournament information
- Dates: August 5–8, 2010
- Location: Akron, Ohio, U.S.
- Courses: Firestone Country Club; South Course
- Tours: PGA Tour; European Tour

Statistics
- Par: 70
- Length: 7,400 yards (6,767 m)
- Field: 81 players
- Cut: None
- Prize fund: $8,500,000 €6,483,924
- Winner's share: $1,400,000 €1,076,840

Champion
- (United States) Hunter Mahan
- 268 (−12)

Location in the United States
Location in Ohio

The 2010 WGC-Bridgestone Invitational was a golf tournament held August 5–8 over the South Course at Firestone Country Club in Akron, Ohio. It was the 12th WGC-Bridgestone Invitational tournament, and the third of four World Golf Championships events held in 2010.

Hunter Mahan won with a score of 64 (−6) on Sunday to finish at 268 (−12), two strokes ahead of runner-up Ryan Palmer.

== Field ==
1. Playing members of the 2009 United States and International Presidents Cup teams.

Ángel Cabrera (3,4), Stewart Cink (2,3,4), Tim Clark (3,4,5), Ernie Els (3,4,5), Jim Furyk (2,3,4,5), Lucas Glover (3,4), Retief Goosen (3,4), Ryo Ishikawa, Zach Johnson (3,4,5), Anthony Kim (2,3,4,5), Justin Leonard (2), Hunter Mahan (2,3,4,5), Phil Mickelson (2,3,4,5), Geoff Ogilvy (3,4,5), Sean O'Hair (3,4), Kenny Perry (2,3,4), Adam Scott (3,4,5), Vijay Singh, Steve Stricker (2,3,4,5), Camilo Villegas (3,4,5), Mike Weir, Tiger Woods (3,4,5), Yang Yong-eun (3,4,5)

(Robert Allenby (3,4,5,6) withdrew prior to the start of the tournament with a knee injury.)

2. Playing members of the 2008 United States and European Ryder Cup teams.

Chad Campbell, Paul Casey (3,4), Ben Curtis, Sergio García (3,4), Søren Hansen, Pádraig Harrington (3,4), J. B. Holmes, Miguel Ángel Jiménez (3,4,5), Robert Karlsson (3,4,5), Graeme McDowell (3,4,5), Ian Poulter (3,4,5), Justin Rose (3,4,5), Henrik Stenson (3,4), Boo Weekley, Lee Westwood (3,4,5), Oliver Wilson

3. The top 50 players from the Official World Golf Ranking as of July 26, 2010.

K. J. Choi (4,6), Ben Crane (4,5), Rhys Davies (4), Luke Donald (4,5), Ross Fisher (4,5), Rickie Fowler (4), Peter Hanson, Dustin Johnson (4,5), Martin Kaymer (4,5), Matt Kuchar (4,5), Rory McIlroy (4,5), Edoardo Molinari (4,5), Francesco Molinari (4), Ryan Moore (4,5), Louis Oosthuizen (4,5), Álvaro Quirós (4), Charl Schwartzel (4), Bo Van Pelt (4), Scott Verplank (4), Nick Watney (4)

4. The top 50 players from the Official World Golf Ranking as of August 2, 2010.

Jeff Overton

5. Tournament winners of worldwide events since the prior year's tournament with an Official World Golf Ranking Strength of Field Rating of 115 points or more.

Stuart Appleby, Jason Bohn, Grégory Bourdy, Jason Day, Simon Dyson, Marcus Fraser, Bill Haas, David Horsey, Michael Jonzon, Simon Khan, James Kingston, Martin Laird, Troy Matteson, Ross McGowan, Alex Norén, Ryan Palmer, Heath Slocum, Bubba Watson

(Carl Pettersson qualified but did not play.)

6. The winner of selected tournaments from each of the following tours:

- Japan Golf Tour: Japan Golf Tour Championship (2010) – Katsumasa Miyamoto
- Japan Golf Tour: Bridgestone Open (2009) – Yuta Ikeda
- PGA Tour of Australasia: Australian PGA Championship (2009) – Robert Allenby, also qualified in categories 1, 3, 4 and 5
- Sunshine Tour: Vodacom Championship (2010) – Hennie Otto
- Asian Tour: Iskandar Johor Open (2009) – K. J. Choi, also qualified in categories 3 and 4

== Round summaries ==
=== First round ===
Thursday, August 5, 2010

Place	Player	Score	To par
1	(United States) Bubba Watson	64	−6
T2	(Northern Ireland) Graeme McDowell	66	−4
T2	(United States) Phil Mickelson	66	−4
T2	(United States) Kenny Perry	66	−4
T2	(Australia) Adam Scott	66	−4
T6	(United States) Chad Campbell	67	−3
T6	(United States) Sean O'Hair	67	−3
T6	(United States) Jeff Overton	67	−3
T6	(United States) Bo Van Pelt	67	−3
T6	(Colombia) Camilo Villegas	67	−3

=== Second round ===
Friday, August 6, 2010

Place	Player	Score	To par
1	(South Africa) Retief Goosen	67-66=133	−7
T2	(United States) Justin Leonard	68-66=134	−6
T2	(United States) Phil Mickelson	66-68=134	−6
T4	(Sweden) Peter Hanson	69-66=135	−5
T4	(United States) Bo Van Pelt	67-68=135	−5
T4	(United States) Bubba Watson	64-71=135	−5
T7	(England) Paul Casey	68-68=136	−4
T7	(United States) Lucas Glover	70-66=136	−4
T7	(Spain) Miguel Ángel Jiménez	69-67=136	−4
T7	(Australia) Adam Scott	66-70=136	−4
T7	(United States) Nick Watney	68-68=136	−4

=== Third round ===
Saturday, August 7, 2010

Place	Player	Score	To par
T1	(United States) Sean O'Hair	67-70-64=201	−9
T1	(United States) Ryan Palmer	70-68-63=201	−9
3	(United States) Matt Kuchar	69-67-66=202	−8
T4	(South Africa) Ernie Els	69-70-64=203	−7
T4	(Sweden) Peter Hanson	69-66-68=203	−7
T4	(United States) Justin Leonard	68-66-69=203	−7
T7	(United States) Hunter Mahan	71-67-66=204	−6
T7	(United States) Jeff Overton	67-70-67=204	−6
T7	(United States) Bo Van Pelt	67-68-69=204	−6
T10	(United States) Dustin Johnson	72-65-68=205	−5
T10	(United States) Phil Mickelson	66-68-71=205	−5
T10	(Japan) Katsumasa Miyamoto	71-72-62=205	−5
T10	(United States) Nick Watney	68-68-69=205	−5
T10	(United States) Bubba Watson	64-71-70=205	−5
T10	(England) Oliver Wilson	71-67-67=205	−5

=== Final round ===
Sunday, August 8, 2010

Place	Player	Score	To par	Money ($)
1	(United States) Hunter Mahan	71-67-66-64=268	−12	1,400,000
2	(United States) Ryan Palmer	70-68-63-69=270	−10	840,000
T3	(South Africa) Retief Goosen	67-66-73-65=271	−9	412,500
T3	(United States) Bo Van Pelt	67-68-69-67=271	−9	412,500
5	(United States) Sean O'Hair	67-70-64-71=272	−8	295,000
T6	(United States) Jim Furyk	72-68-69-64=273	−7	227,500
T6	(United States) Jeff Overton	67-70-67-69=273	−7	227,500
8	(Sweden) Peter Hanson	69-66-68-71=274	−6	180,000
T9	(Republic of Ireland) Pádraig Harrington	69-70-70-66=275	−5	125,833
T9	(United States) Matt Kuchar	69-67-66-73=275	−5	125,833
T9	(Northern Ireland) Rory McIlroy	68-69-69-69=275	−5	125,833
T9	(South Africa) Louis Oosthuizen	72-70-68-65=275	−5	125,833
T9	(Australia) Adam Scott	66-70-72-67=275	−5	125,833
T9	(United States) Steve Stricker	68-71-69-67=275	−5	125,833

==== Scorecard ====
Final round

Hole	1	2	3	4	5	6	7	8	9	10	11	12	13	14	15	16	17	18
Par	4	5	4	4	3	4	3	4	4	4	4	3	4	4	3	5	4	4
(United States) Mahan	−6	−6	−7	−8	−9	−9	−9	−10	−11	−11	−11	−11	−12	−12	−12	−12	−12	−12
(United States) Palmer	−10	−9	−9	−9	−9	−9	−9	−9	−8	−9	−10	−10	−10	−10	−10	−10	−10	−10
(South Africa) Goosen	−4	−6	−6	−6	−6	−5	−5	−6	−6	−6	−6	−7	−7	−7	−8	−9	−9	−9
(United States) Van Pelt	−6	−7	−7	−8	−8	−8	−8	−8	−8	−9	−8	−9	−10	−10	−9	−9	−9	−9
(United States) O'Hair	−9	−10	−10	−11	−11	−11	−11	−10	−10	−10	−9	−9	−9	−8	−8	−8	−8	−8
(United States) Furyk	−1	−3	−4	−4	−4	−3	−3	−4	−5	−5	−5	−6	−7	−7	−7	−6	−6	−7
(United States) Overton	−6	−6	−6	−6	−7	−6	−6	−5	−6	−5	−5	−5	−5	−6	−6	−5	−6	−7

Cumulative tournament scores, relative to par

Eagle	Birdie	Bogey
