= 2010 BMW PGA Championship =

Tournament information
- Dates: 20–23 May 2010
- Location: Virginia Water, Surrey, England; 51.40°N 0.59°W
- Courses: Wentworth Club; West Course
- Tour: European Tour

Statistics
- Par: 72
- Length: 7,263 yards (6,641 m)
- Field: 150 players, 78 after cut
- Cut: 145 (+1)
- Prize fund: €4,500,000
- Winner's share: €750,000

Champion
- (England) Simon Khan
- 278 (−10)

Location map
- Location in England Location in Surrey

The 2010 BMW PGA Championship was the 56th edition of the BMW PGA Championship, an annual professional golf tournament on the European Tour. It was held 20–23 May at the West Course of Wentworth Club in Virginia Water, Surrey, England, a suburb southwest of London.

Englishman Simon Khan won his first BMW PGA Championship with a one stroke victory over Swede Fredrik Andersson Hed and fellow Englishman Luke Donald.

== Course layout ==
Wentworth Club, West Course
Tee	Rating/Slope	1	2	3	4	5	6	7	8	9	Out	10	11	12	13	14	15	16	17	18	In	Total
Yardage	n/a	474	154	465	552	203	418	396	392	449	3,503	184	416	490	470	179	489	383	610	539	3,760	7,263
Par		4	3	4	5	3	4	4	4	4	35	3	4	5	4	3	4	4	5	5	37	72

== Round summaries ==
=== First round ===
Thursday, 20 May 2010

Place	Player	Score	To par
1	(England) Danny Willett	65	−7
2	(Australia) Richard Green	66	−6
T3	(India) Shiv Chawrasia	67	−5
T3	(England) Ross Fisher	67	−5
T3	(Scotland) Richie Ramsay	67	−5
T3	(England) Steve Webster	67	−5
T7	(South Africa) Thomas Aiken	68	−4
T7	(Sweden) Fredrik Andersson Hed	68	−4
T7	(England) Richard Bland	68	−4
T7	(Belgium) Nicolas Colsaerts	68	−4
T7	(England) Luke Donald	68	−4
T7	(South Africa) James Kingston	68	−4
T7	(Denmark) Søren Kjeldsen	68	−4
T7	(New Zealand) Danny Lee	68	−4
T7	(Northern Ireland) Gareth Maybin	68	−4

=== Second round ===
Friday, 21 May 2010

Place	Player	Score	To par
1	(England) Luke Donald	68-68=136	−8
T2	(England) Ross Fisher	67-70=137	−7
T2	(South Africa) James Kingston	68-69=137	−7
T2	(England) Danny Willett	65-72=137	−7
T5	(Sweden) Fredrik Andersson Hed	68-70=138	−6
T5	(England) Paul Casey	70-68=138	−6
T5	(Republic of Ireland) Pádraig Harrington	71-67=138	−6
T5	(England) Chris Wood	70-68=138	−6
T9	(South Africa) Ernie Els	69-70=139	−5
T9	(Argentina) Ricardo González	69-70=139	−5
T9	(Germany) Marcel Siem	69-70=139	−5

=== Third round ===
Saturday, 22 May 2010

Place	Player	Score	To par
1	(England) Chris Wood	70-68-67=205	−11
T2	(Sweden) Robert Karlsson	65-70-62=207	−9
T2	(England) Danny Willett	65-72-70=207	−9
4	(England) Luke Donald	68-68-72=208	−8
T5	(England) Paul Casey	70-68-72=210	−6
T5	(Scotland) Stephen Gallacher	69-72-69=210	−6
T5	(Republic of Ireland) Pádraig Harrington	71-67-72=210	−6
T5	(South Africa) James Kingston	68-69-73=210	−6
T5	(Germany) Marcel Siem	79-70-71=210	−6
T10	(South Africa) Thomas Aiken	68-73-70=211	−5
T10	(Scotland) Paul Lawrie	71-69-71=211	−5
T10	(South Korea) Noh Seung-yul	74-71-66=211	−5

=== Final round ===
Sunday, 23 May 2010

Place	Player	Score	To par	Money (€)
1	(England) Simon Khan	72-69-71-66=278	−10	750,000
T2	(Sweden) Fredrik Andersson Hed	68-70-74-67=279	−9	390,850
T2	(England) Luke Donald	68-68-72-71=279	−9	390,850
4	(Scotland) Stephen Gallacher	69-72-69-70=280	−8	225,000
5	(England) Danny Willett	65-72-70-74=281	−7	190,800
T6	(Republic of Ireland) Pádraig Harrington	71-67-72-72=282	−6	126,450
T6	(South Africa) James Kingston	68-69-73-72=282	−6	126,450
T6	(Scotland) Paul Lawrie	71-69-71-71=282	−6	126,450
T6	(England) Chris Wood	70-68-67-77=282	−6	126,450
T10	(England) Ross Fisher	67-70-76-70=283	−5	83,400
T10	(England) Justin Rose	74-69-70-70=283	−5	83,400
T10	(England) Lee Westwood	70-74-73-66=283	−5	83,400
