= Vivendi Cup =

Tournament information
- Location: Chambourcy, France
- Established: 2010
- Course: Golf de Joyenval
- Par: 72
- Length: 6,729 yards (6,153 m)
- Tour: European Tour
- Format: Stroke play
- Prize fund: €1,250,000
- Month played: September

Tournament record score
- Aggregate: 271 John Parry (2010)
- To par: −17 as above

Final champion
- (England) John Parry
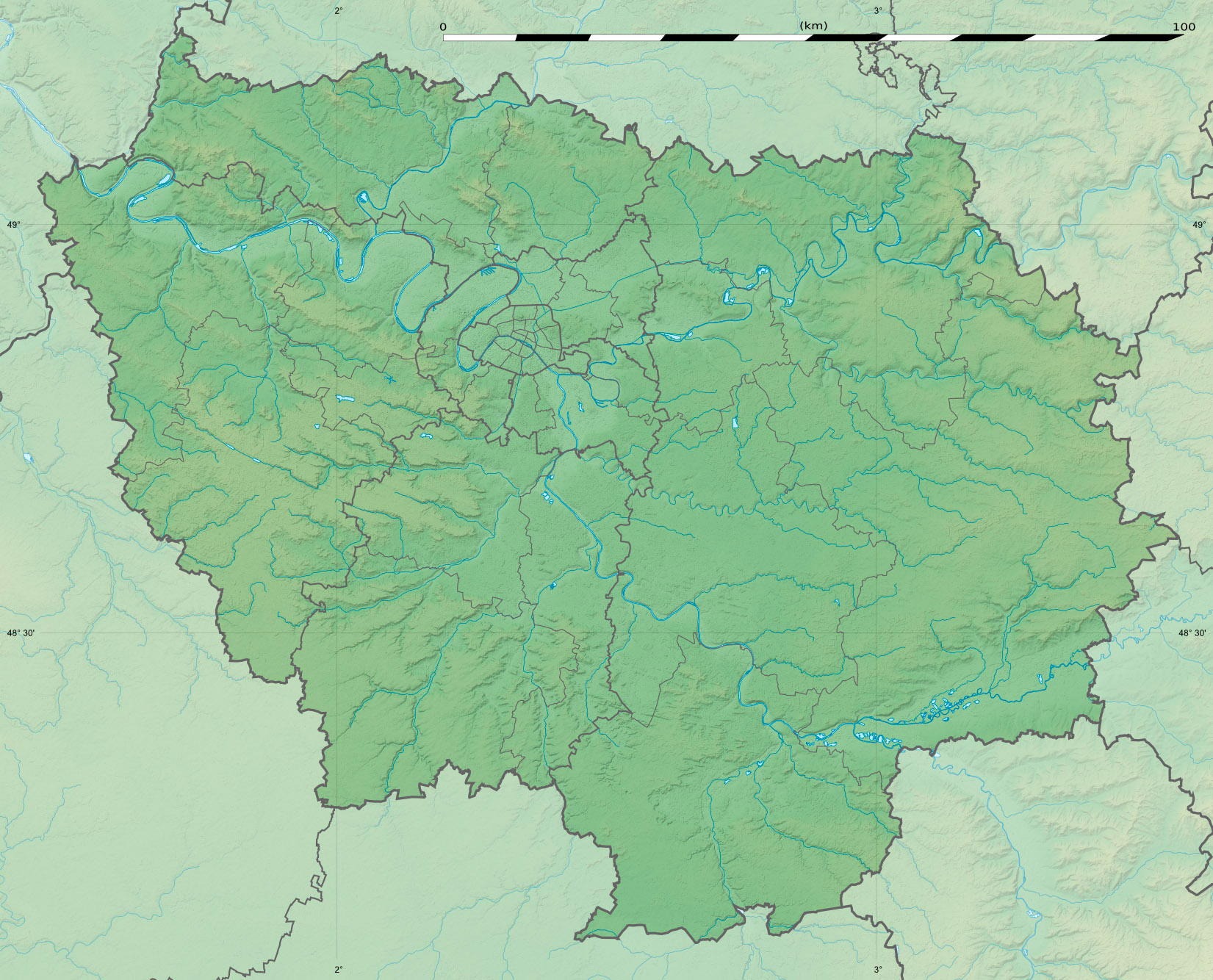
- Location in France Location in Île-de-France

The Vivendi Cup was a one-off European Tour golf tournament which was played from 23 to 26 September 2010 at Golf de Joyenval, Chambourcy near Paris in France. The Vivendi Cup was a 72-hole stroke play tournament, with the first 36 holes played as a team Pro-Am event involving one professional and one amateur over the Retz and Marly Courses at Golf de Joyenval, both designed by Robert Trent Jones. The sponsors for the event were Canal+ and Vivendi.

== Winners ==
Year	Winner	Score	To par	Margin of victory	Runner-up
2010	(England) John Parry	271	−17	2 strokes	(Sweden) Johan Edfors
