= Marc Warren (golfer) =

Scottish professional golfer (born 1981)

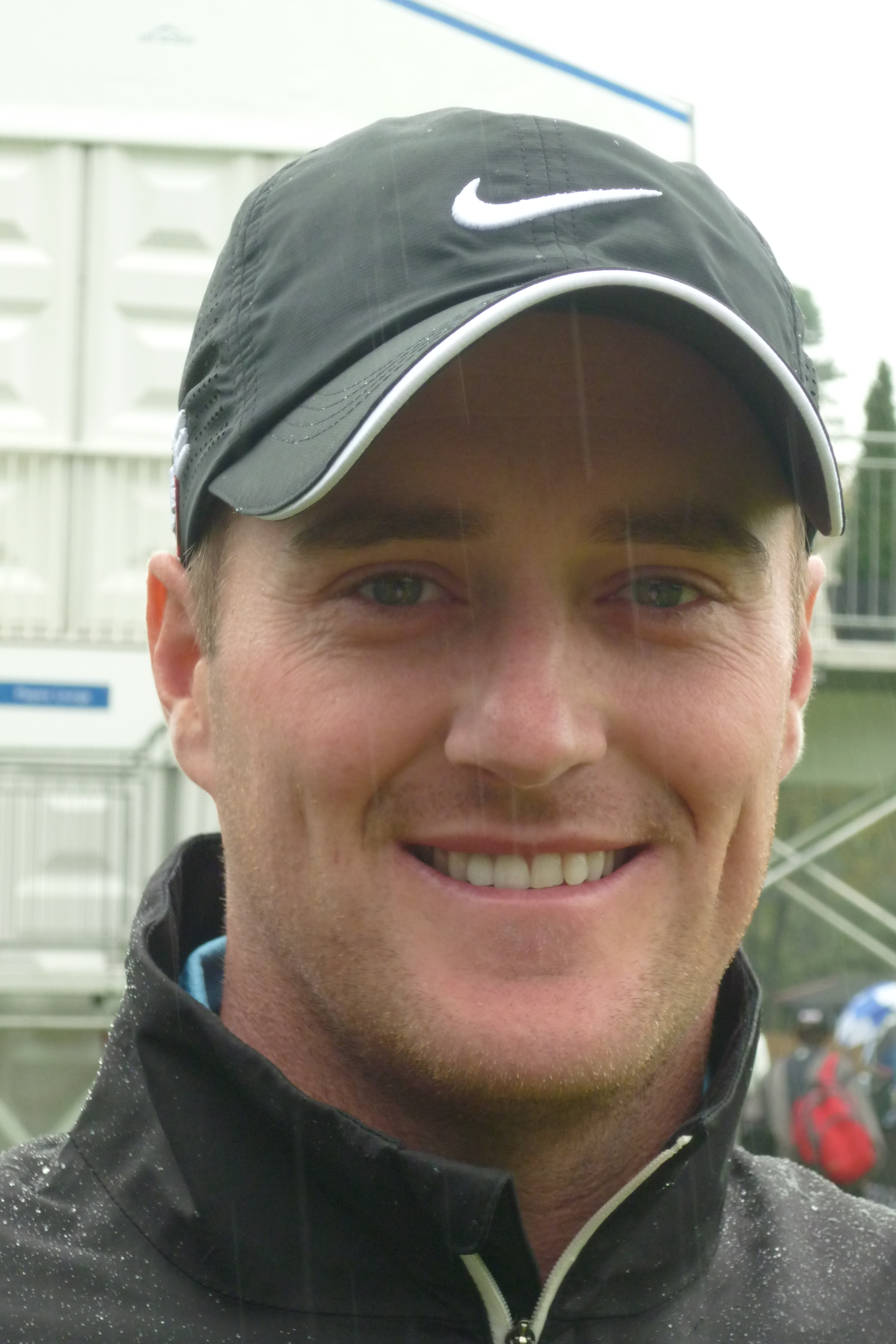

Personal information
- Nationality: Scotland
- Born: 1 April 1981 (age 45) Rutherglen, Scotland
- Height: 5 ft 11 in (1.80 m)
- Weight: 168 lb (76 kg; 12.0 st)
- Spouse: Laura (m. 2010)

Career
- Sport: Golf
- Turned professional: 2002
- Current tour: European Tour
- Former tour: Challenge Tour
- Professional wins: 7
- Highest ranking: 48 (8 February 2015)

Number of wins by tour
- European Tour: 4
- Challenge Tour: 3
- Other: 1

Best results in major championships
- Masters Tournament: DNP
- PGA Championship: T12: 2013
- U.S. Open: T27: 2015
- The Open Championship: T39: 2014

Achievements and awards
- Challenge Tour Rankings winner: 2005
- Sir Henry Cotton Rookie of the Year: 2006

Marc Warren (born 1 April 1981) is a Scottish professional golfer who plays on the European Tour. He has won three European Tour victories in his career and finished 26th in the 2014 Race to Dubai, his strongest professional year. After a professional surge early in career, he endured a pair of challenging tournament losses in 2012 and 2013 before his strong 2014 showing.

== Early life and amateur career ==
Warren was born in Rutherglen, South Lanarkshire and grew up supporting Rangers. As an amateur he was a member of East Kilbride Golf Club, and he was awarded honorary life membership of the club in February 2002. He represented Great Britain & Ireland at the 2001 Walker Cup, where he holed the winning putt.

== Professional career ==
In 2002, Warren turned professional. He began his professional career on the second tier Challenge Tour, and finished top of the Challenge Tour Rankings in 2005, to graduate directly to the European Tour. He claimed his first European Tour title during his first season, at the EnterCard Scandinavian Masters. He finished his début season 42nd on the Order of Merit, and was named the European Tour's Sir Henry Cotton Rookie of the Year. At the end of the year, he partnered Colin Montgomerie to second place for Scotland in the 2006 WGC-World Cup, after losing out to Germany in a playoff.

In 2007 Warren captured the Johnnie Walker Championship at Gleneagles, after overcoming Simon Wakefield on the second hole of a sudden death playoff. Again he finished the season ranked 42nd on the Order of Merit. In November, he partnered Montgomerie for the second time in the Omega Mission Hills World Cup, and this time the pair won the tournament, defeating the American team in a sudden death playoff.

In the years that followed, Warren had limited success on the European Tour, finishing outside the top 100 in the Order of Merit standings in both 2010 and 2011. In July 2012, Warren had an opportunity to win his home event, the Scottish Open at Castle Stuart Golf Links. With four holes to go, Warren held a one shot lead over the field, but finished poorly, dropping four shots in four holes, including a double-bogey at the 15th, to fall one shot outside of a playoff.

Warren endured more final round heartache in April 2013 at the Open de España. Warren had led for most of the final round before consecutive bogeys at the 14th and 15th put him one shot behind. However he picked up a birdie at the 16th, but then proceeded to three-putt both the 17th and 18th to once again fall a shot outside the playoff and into a tie for fourth. A few weeks later at the BMW PGA Championship at Wentworth, Warren lost out in a three-man sudden-death playoff for the title. He birdied the first four holes on the back nine during the final round to go into a one shot lead, but bogeyed 15, then parred his way in to make the playoff with Simon Khan and Matteo Manassero. At the first extra hole, Warren drove his tee shot into the trees on the right at 18 and had to go back to the tee. After hitting his drive down the fairway, he then dumped his fourth shot into the water hazard. He managed to get up and down for a double-bogey, but both Khan and Manassero made birdies to eliminate Warren.

In July 2020, Warren claimed a one-stroke victory over Marcel Schneider to win the dual-ranking Austrian Open for his fourth win on the European Tour and his third on the Challenge Tour.

== Amateur wins ==
- 1994 Doug Sanders World Boys Championship
- 1996 English Amateur Championship

== Professional wins (7) ==
=== European Tour wins (4) ===
| No. | Date | Tournament | Winning score | Margin of victory | Runner-up |
|---|---|---|---|---|---|
| 1 | 6 Aug 2006 | EnterCard Scandinavian Masters | −10 (67-69-73-69=278) | Playoff | (Sweden) Robert Karlsson |
| 2 | 2 Sep 2007 | Johnnie Walker Championship at Gleneagles | −12 (65-73-73-69=280) | Playoff | (England) Simon Wakefield |
| 3 | 17 Aug 2014 | Made in Denmark | −9 (71-70-66-68=275) | 2 strokes | (Wales) Bradley Dredge |
| 4 | 12 Jul 2020 | Austrian Open^{1} | −13 (66-69-70-70=275) | 1 stroke | (Germany) Marcel Schneider |

^{1}Dual-ranking event with the Challenge Tour

European Tour playoff record (2–1)

| No. | Year | Tournament | Opponent(s) | Result |
|---|---|---|---|---|
| 1 | 2006 | EnterCard Scandinavian Masters | (Sweden) Robert Karlsson | Won with par on second extra hole |
| 2 | 2007 | Johnnie Walker Championship at Gleneagles | (England) Simon Wakefield | Won with birdie on second extra hole |
| 3 | 2013 | BMW PGA Championship | (England) Simon Khan, (Italy) Matteo Manassero | Manassero won with birdie on fourth extra hole Warren eliminated by birdie on first hole |

=== Challenge Tour wins (3) ===
| No. | Date | Tournament | Winning score | Margin of victory | Runner-up |
|---|---|---|---|---|---|
| 1 | 31 Jul 2005 | Ireland Ryder Cup Challenge | −16 (67-67-72-66=272) | Playoff | (Scotland) Peter Whiteford |
| 2 | 21 Aug 2005 | Rolex Trophy | −16 (64-68-69-71=272) | Playoff | (England) Denny Lucas |
| 3 | 12 Jul 2020 | Austrian Open^{1} | −13 (66-69-70-70=275) | 1 stroke | (Germany) Marcel Schneider |

^{1}Dual-ranking event with the European Tour

Challenge Tour playoff record (2–0)

| No. | Year | Tournament | Opponent | Result |
|---|---|---|---|---|
| 1 | 2005 | Ireland Ryder Cup Challenge | (Scotland) Peter Whiteford | Won with par on third extra hole |
| 2 | 2005 | Rolex Trophy | (England) Denny Lucas | Won with birdie on first extra hole |

=== Other wins (1) ===
| No. | Date | Tournament | Winning score | Margin of victory | Runners-up |
|---|---|---|---|---|---|
| 1 | 25 Nov 2007 | Omega Mission Hills World Cup (with (Scotland) Colin Montgomerie) | −25 (63-68-66-66=263) | Playoff | United States − Heath Slocum and Boo Weekley |

Other playoff record (1–1)

| No. | Year | Tournament | Opponents | Result |
|---|---|---|---|---|
| 1 | 2006 | WGC-World Cup (with (Scotland) Colin Montgomerie) | Germany − Bernhard Langer and Marcel Siem | Lost to par on first extra hole |
| 3 | 2007 | Omega Mission Hills World Cup (with (Scotland) Colin Montgomerie) | United States − Heath Slocum and Boo Weekley | Won with par on third extra hole |

== Results in major championships ==
| Tournament | 2012 | 2013 | 2014 | 2015 | 2016 | 2017 | 2018 |
|---|---|---|---|---|---|---|---|
| Masters Tournament | | | | | | | |
| U.S. Open | T65 | | | T27 | | | |
| The Open Championship | | CUT | T39 | T40 | CUT | | |
| PGA Championship | | T12 | T15 | T48 | | | |

| Tournament | 2019 | 2020 | 2021 | 2022 | 2023 |
|---|---|---|---|---|---|
| Masters Tournament | | | | | |
| PGA Championship | | | | | |
| U.S. Open | | | | | |
| The Open Championship | | NT | | | CUT |

Did not play

CUT = missed the half-way cut
"T" = tied
NT = No tournament due to COVID-19 pandemic

== Results in World Golf Championships ==
Results not in chronological order before 2015.

| Tournament | 2014 | 2015 |
|---|---|---|
| Match Play | | T34 |
| Championship | | |
| Invitational | | T25 |
| Champions | T35 | T76 |

Did not play

"T" = Tied

== Team appearances ==
Amateur

- European Youths' Team Championship (representing Scotland): 2000
- European Amateur Team Championship (representing Scotland): 2001 (winners)
- Walker Cup (representing Great Britain & Ireland): 2001 (winners)
- Bonallack Trophy (representing Europe): 2002

Professional

- World Cup (representing Scotland): 2006, 2007 (winners)
- Seve Trophy (representing Great Britain & Ireland): 2007 (winners), 2013
- Royal Trophy (representing Europe): 2013 (winners)

== See also ==
- 2005 Challenge Tour graduates
- 2018 European Tour Qualifying School graduates
- 2026 Challenge Tour graduates
