= 2018 BMW PGA Championship =

Tournament information
- Dates: 24–27 May 2018
- Location: Virginia Water, Surrey, England; 51.40°N 0.59°W
- Courses: Wentworth Club; West Course
- Tour: European Tour

Statistics
- Par: 72
- Length: 7,302 yards (6,677 m)
- Field: 150 players, 68 after cut
- Cut: 143 (−1)
- Prize fund: US$7,000,000

Champion
- (Italy) Francesco Molinari
- 271 (−17)

Location map
- Location in England Location in Surrey

The 2018 BMW PGA Championship was the 64th edition of the BMW PGA Championship, an annual golf tournament on the European Tour, held 24–27 May at the West Course of Wentworth Club in Virginia Water, Surrey, England, a suburb southwest of London.

== Course layout ==
Wentworth Club, West Course
Tee	Rating/Slope	1	2	3	4	5	6	7	8	9	Out	10	11	12	13	14	15	16	17	18	In	Total
Yardage	n/a	473	154	465	552	203	418	396	391	449	3,501	184	416	531	470	179	489	383	610	539	3,801	7,302
Par		4	3	4	5	3	4	4	4	4	35	3	4	5	4	3	4	4	5	5	37	72

== Round summaries ==
=== First round ===
Thursday, 24 May 2018

Place	Player	Score	To par
1	(Denmark) Lucas Bjerregaard	65	−7
T2	(South Africa) Dean Burmester	66	−6
T2	(South Africa) Darren Fichardt	66	−6
T4	(England) Richard Bland	67	−5
T4	(England) Matt Fitzpatrick	67	−5
T4	(England) Sam Horsfield	67	−5
T4	(Northern Ireland) Rory McIlroy	67	−5
T8	(Thailand) Kiradech Aphibarnrat	68	−4
T8	(Italy) Nino Bertasio	68	−4
T8	(Wales) Bradley Dredge	68	−4
T8	(Denmark) Lasse Jensen	68	−4
T8	(Finland) Mikko Korhonen	68	−4
T8	(England) Chris Paisley	68	−4

=== Second round ===
Friday, 25 May 2018

Place	Player	Score	To par
1	(Northern Ireland) Rory McIlroy	67-65=132	−12
T2	(France) Sébastien Gros	69-66=135	−9
T2	(England) Sam Horsfield	67-68=135	−9
4	(England) Tommy Fleetwood	70-66=136	−8
T5	(Thailand) Kiradech Aphibarnrat	68-69=137	−7
T5	(Italy) Francesco Molinari	70-67=137	−7
T5	(Sweden) Alex Norén	69-68=137	−7
T5	(England) Robert Rock	69-68=137	−7
T9	(Italy) Nino Bertasio	68-70=138	−6
T9	(Denmark) Lucas Bjerregaard	65-73=138	−6
T9	(South Africa) Darren Fichardt	66-72=138	−6
T9	(England) Matt Fitzpatrick	67-71=138	−6
T9	(South Africa) Branden Grace	69-69=138	−6
T9	(Denmark) Lasse Jensen	68-70=138	−6
T9	(Finland) Mikko Korhonen	68-70=138	−6
T9	(France) Alexander Lévy	70-68=138	−6
T9	(Northern Ireland) Graeme McDowell	71-67=138	−6
T9	(Paraguay) Fabrizio Zanotti	69-69=138	−6

=== Third round ===
Saturday, 26 May 2018

Place	Player	Score	To par
T1	(Northern Ireland) Rory McIlroy	67-65-71=203	−13
T1	(Italy) Francesco Molinari	70-67-66=203	−13
T3	(England) Ross Fisher	71-68-68=207	−9
T3	(South Africa) Branden Grace	69-69-69=207	−9
T3	(England) Sam Horsfield	67-68-72=207	−9
T3	(Sweden) Alex Norén	69-68-70=207	−9
T7	(Thailand) Kiradech Aphibarnrat	68-69-71=208	−8
T7	(France) Sébastien Gros	69-66-73=208	−8
T7	(Finland) Mikko Korhonen	68-70-70=208	−8
T7	(England) Lee Westwood	70-69-69=208	−8

=== Final round ===
Sunday, 27 May 2018

Place	Player	Score	To par	Prize money (€)
1	(Italy) Francesco Molinari	70-67-66-68=271	−17	995,394
2	(Northern Ireland) Rory McIlroy	67-65-71-70=273	−15	663,593
T3	(Denmark) Lucas Bjerregaard	65-73-71-65=274	−14	336,246
T3	(Sweden) Alex Norén	69-68-70-67=274	−14	336,246
T5	(Thailand) Kiradech Aphibarnrat	68-69-71-67=275	−13	231,132
T5	(South Africa) Branden Grace	69-69-69-68=275	−13	231,132
7	(South Africa) Darren Fichardt	66-72-71-67=276	−12	179,172
T8	(Spain) Rafa Cabrera-Bello	72-68-70-68=278	−10	128,108
T8	(England) Ross Fisher	71-68-68-71=278	−10	128,108
T8	(England) Matt Fitzpatrick	67-71-73-67=278	−10	128,108
T8	(Thailand) Thongchai Jaidee	69-72-69-68=278	−10	128,108
