= Joost Luiten =

Dutch professional golfer (born 1986)

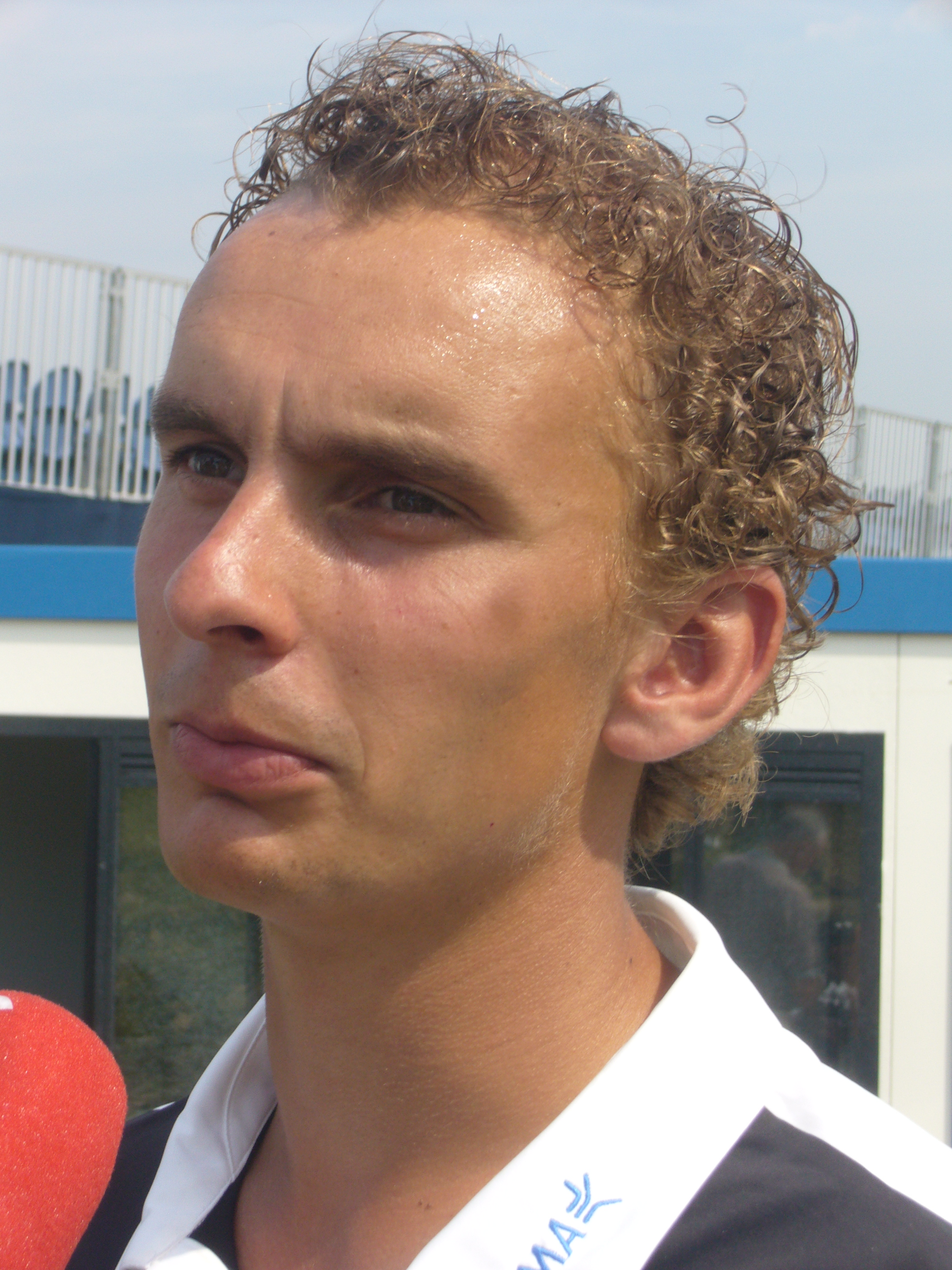
- Luiten in 2009

Personal information
- Full name: Willibrordus Adrianus Maria Luiten
- Nationality: Netherlands
- Born: 7 January 1986 (age 40) Bleiswijk, Netherlands
- Height: 1.78 m (5 ft 10 in)
- Weight: 70 kg (154 lb; 11 st 0 lb)

Career
- Sport: Golf
- Turned professional: 2006
- Current tour: European Tour
- Former tours: Challenge Tour; Alps Tour; EPD Tour
- Professional wins: 9
- Highest ranking: 28 (23 November 2014)

Number of wins by tour
- European Tour: 6
- Asian Tour: 1
- Challenge Tour: 2
- Other: 1

Best results in major championships
- Masters Tournament: T26: 2014
- PGA Championship: T21: 2012
- U.S. Open: T39: 2015
- The Open Championship: T32: 2019

Willibrordus Adrianus Maria "Joost" Luiten (born 7 January 1986) is a Dutch professional golfer who plays on the European Tour.

== Early life and amateur career ==
Luiten was born in Bleiswijk and started playing golf at 6 years old at Golf Centrum Rotterdam. As an amateur, he won the 2005 Spanish Amateur Open Championship and German Amateur Open Championship.

He represented his country at the 2004 European Boys' Team Championship and was selected for the 2006 Palmer Cup. Luiten was a member of the 2006 Dutch team that won the Eisenhower Trophy after he played his last five holes in six under par.

== Professional career ==
After a failed bid for a European Tour card at Qualifying School in late 2006, Luiten started his professional career on the EPD Tour where he claimed second place twice in just four starts.

Reaching the final stage of Q School gave him limited status on the 2007 Challenge Tour. He made his first start at the Tusker Kenya Open, where he birdied the 72nd hole for a share of tenth place. This was enough to earn himself a start in the next tournament, where he finished third. In his third start, he won the A.G.F. Allianz Golf Open de Toulouse. A month later he won the Vodafone Challenge, setting a record for lowest final round by a Challenge Tour winner with a 61 (−11). He went on to finish sixth in the 2007 Challenge Tour rankings and receive a European Tour card for 2008, in addition to finishing second at the European Tour's KLM Open in August 2007.

In January 2008, Luiten reached the top 100 in the Official World Golf Rankings for the first time. He claimed two top-10 finishes on the European Tour before a wrist injury curtailed his season. He returned from injury in late 2009 and played the start of the 2010 season on a minor medical exemption, securing his card for the rest of 2010 with a top-ten finish at the Joburg Open. He finished the season 28th on the Race to Dubai, aided by a late run of three straight top-five finishes.

In November 2011, Luiten won his first tournament on the European Tour with a victory in the Iskandar Johor Open in Malaysia, which also gave him his highest world ranking position to that point, at 66th. He finished in the top 30 of the Race to Dubai for the second consecutive year, ranked 24th.

Luiten won for the second time on the European Tour in June 2013 at the Lyoness Open in Austria. He took a three stroke advantage into the final round and shot a one-under-par 71 to finish two ahead of Thomas Bjørn. He became only the second player from the Netherlands to record multiple European Tour victories, after Robert-Jan Derksen.

In 2014, Luiten won the ISPS Handa Wales Open and finished third at the Volvo Golf Champions, sixth at the Abu Dhabi HSBC Golf Championship, fourth at the Open de España, third at the Lyoness Open and third at the Volvo World Match Play Championship. By the end of November, he reached 28th in the Official World Golf Ranking, the high ranking in his career. He also played in the United States, finishing 13th at the WGC-Cadillac Championship and 26th at the Masters Tournament and PGA Championship.

In the first half of 2016 Luiten collected eight top-10 finishes in 15 events, with second places in consecutive weeks at the Real Club Valderrama Open de España and the Shenzhen International. In August, he represented Netherlands at the 2016 Summer Olympics, finishing tied for the 27th place. The following month, he went on to win for the second time the KLM Open, matching the course record with an 8-under par 63 on the final round.

In February 2018, Luiten won the NBO Oman Open, beating Chris Wood by two shots.

=== 2024 Olympics controversy ===
In June 2024, Luiten qualified to play in the 2024 Summer Olympics via his world ranking (147). The Dutch Olympic Committee did not allow him and Darius van Driel (ranked 237) to participate since they required their participants to be ranked in the top 27 of the Olympic Golf Ranking and have "a realistic chance at a medal". Luiten initially appealed against the Dutch Olympic Committee for prohibiting him to play, considering that he was eligible. He won the appeal. However, Luiten was denied access to play due to his initial entry being removed by the Dutch Olympic Committee and his place being taken by Tapio Pulkkanen.

== Amateur wins ==
- 2004 Dutch Boys Championship, Dutch Youths Championship
- 2005 Spanish International Amateur Championship, German Amateur Open Championship

== Professional wins (9) ==
=== European Tour wins (6) ===
| No. | Date | Tournament | Winning score | Margin of victory | Runner(s)-up |
|---|---|---|---|---|---|
| 1 | 20 Nov 2011 | Iskandar Johor Open^{1} | −15 (63-70-65=198) (Note: Shortened to 54 holes due to weather.) | 1 stroke | (Sweden) Daniel Chopra |
| 2 | 9 Jun 2013 | Lyoness Open | −17 (65-68-67-71=271) | 2 strokes | (Denmark) Thomas Bjørn |
| 3 | 15 Sep 2013 | KLM Open | −12 (69-65-66-68=268) | Playoff | (Spain) Miguel Ángel Jiménez |
| 4 | 21 Sep 2014 | ISPS Handa Wales Open | −14 (65-69-65-71=270) | 1 stroke | (England) Tommy Fleetwood, (Republic of Ireland) Shane Lowry |
| 5 | 11 Sep 2016 | KLM Open (2) | −19 (69-64-69-63=265) | 3 strokes | (Austria) Bernd Wiesberger |
| 6 | 18 Feb 2018 | NBO Oman Open | −16 (72-66-66-68=272) | 2 strokes | (England) Chris Wood |

^{1}Co-sanctioned by the Asian Tour

European Tour playoff record (1–0)

| No. | Year | Tournament | Opponent | Result |
|---|---|---|---|---|
| 1 | 2013 | KLM Open | (Spain) Miguel Ángel Jiménez | Won with par on first extra hole |

=== Challenge Tour wins (2) ===
| No. | Date | Tournament | Winning score | Margin of victory | Runner-up |
|---|---|---|---|---|---|
| 1 | 13 May 2007 | A.G.F. Allianz Golf Open de Toulouse | −17 (70-71-66-64=271) | 1 stroke | (Belgium) Nicolas Vanhootegem |
| 2 | 10 Jun 2007 | Vodafone Challenge | −18 (70-68-71-61=270) | 2 strokes | (Sweden) Magnus A. Carlsson |

=== Alps Tour wins (1) ===
| No. | Date | Tournament | Winning score | Margin of victory | Runners-up |
|---|---|---|---|---|---|
| 1 | 18 Jul 2009 | Circolo Rapallo Golf Open | −8 (71-65-66=202) | Playoff | (France) Thomas Fournier, (Italy) Andrea Perrino |

== Results in major championships ==
Results not in chronological order in 2020.

| Tournament | 2011 | 2012 | 2013 | 2014 | 2015 | 2016 | 2017 | 2018 |
|---|---|---|---|---|---|---|---|---|
| Masters Tournament | | | | T26 | CUT | | | |
| U.S. Open | | | | CUT | T39 | | | |
| The Open Championship | T63 | T45 | | CUT | CUT | CUT | T44 | |
| PGA Championship | | T21 | CUT | 26 | CUT | T33 | CUT | |

| Tournament | 2019 | 2020 | 2021 | 2022 | 2023 | 2024 |
|---|---|---|---|---|---|---|
| Masters Tournament | | | | | | |
| PGA Championship | T64 | T51 | | | | |
| U.S. Open | | | | | | |
| The Open Championship | T32 | NT | CUT | | T71 | CUT |

Did not play

CUT = missed the half-way cut
"T" = tied for place
NT = no tournament due to COVID-19 pandemic

=== Summary ===
| Tournament | Wins | 2nd | 3rd | Top-5 | Top-10 | Top-25 | Events | Cuts made |
|---|---|---|---|---|---|---|---|---|
| Masters Tournament | 0 | 0 | 0 | 0 | 0 | 0 | 2 | 1 |
| PGA Championship | 0 | 0 | 0 | 0 | 0 | 1 | 8 | 5 |
| U.S. Open | 0 | 0 | 0 | 0 | 0 | 0 | 2 | 1 |
| The Open Championship | 0 | 0 | 0 | 0 | 0 | 0 | 10 | 5 |
| Totals | 0 | 0 | 0 | 0 | 0 | 1 | 22 | 12 |

- Most consecutive cuts made – 3 (2011 Open Championship – 2012 PGA)
- Longest streak of top-10s – 0

== Results in The Players Championship ==
| Tournament | 2014 | 2015 |
|---|---|---|
| The Players Championship | T80 | T51 |

"T" indicates a tie for a place

== Results in World Golf Championships ==
Results not in chronological order before 2015.

| Tournament | 2012 | 2013 | 2014 | 2015 | 2016 | 2017 | 2018 | 2019 |
|---|---|---|---|---|---|---|---|---|
| Championship | | | T13 | T46 | | T25 | T37 | T10 |
| Match Play | | | R64 | T17 | | T39 | | |
| Invitational | T63 | | T56 | T45 | | | | |
| Champions | T36 | | T28 | | T16 | | | T34 |

Top 10
Did not play

QF, R16, R32, R64 = Round in which player lost in match play
"T" = tied

== Team appearances ==
Amateur

- European Boys' Team Championship (representing the Netherlands): 2004
- European Amateur Team Championship (representing the Netherlands): 2005
- European Youths' Team Championship (representing the Netherlands): 2006
- Bonallack Trophy (representing Europe): 2006 (winners)
- Eisenhower Trophy (representing the Netherlands): 2006 (winners)
- Palmer Cup (representing Europe): 2006 (winners)

Professional

- World Cup (representing the Netherlands): 2011, 2016, 2018
- Seve Trophy (representing Continental Europe): 2013 (winners)
- EurAsia Cup (representing Europe): 2014 (shared)

== See also ==
- 2007 Challenge Tour graduates
