= 2013 Seve Trophy =

Golf tournament in France

- Dates: 3–6 October
- Venue: Golf de Saint-Nom-la-Bretèche
- Location: Paris, France
- Captains: José María Olazábal (Europe); Sam Torrance (GB&I)
(Europe)	15	13	(United Kingdom) (Republic of Ireland)
- Continental Europe wins the Seve Trophy

The 2013 Seve Trophy by Golf+, the eighth edition of the Seve Trophy, was played 3–6 October at Golf de Saint-Nom-la-Bretèche in France. The team captain for Great Britain and Ireland was Sam Torrance, while the captain for Continental Europe was José María Olazábal. The contest took place at the same time as the 2013 Presidents Cup, unlike 2009 and 2011 when it was scheduled during the PGA Tour's FedEx Cup playoffs. Continental Europe won the tournament by 15 to 13, their first victory since 2000.

== Format ==
The teams competed over four days with five fourball matches on both Thursday and Friday, four foursomes matches on Saturday morning, a further four foursomes matches on Saturday afternoon and ten singles matches on Sunday. This means that a total of 28 points were available with 14½ points required for victory. This was the first Seve Trophy without any greensome matches.

The total prize fund was €1,750,000.

== Teams ==
The teams are made up of five leading players from the Official World Golf Ranking as of 23 September 2013 and five leading players (not otherwise qualified) from the Race to Dubai at the conclusion of the Italian Open (22 September 2013). There were a number of players (listed after each table below) who qualified for the trophy, but pulled out.

Gonzalo Fernández-Castaño was a late replacement for Peter Hanson who withdrew from the Continental Europe team with a back injury. Hanson had qualified as one of the leading 5 players in the World Rankings (world ranked 39). After his withdrawal his place amongst the World Rankings qualifiers was taken by Nicolas Colsaerts who had previously qualified through the Race to Dubai list. Colsaerts' place in the Race to Dubai list was taken by Fernández-Castaño.

Team GB&I
Name	Country	Qualification	World Ranking	Race to Dubai
Sam Torrance	Scotland	Non-playing captain	—	—
Jamie Donaldson	Wales	World Rankings	43	19
David Lynn	England	World Rankings	52	102
Stephen Gallacher	Scotland	World Rankings	63	15
Chris Wood	England	World Rankings	67	25
Paul Lawrie	Scotland	World Rankings	69	57
Marc Warren	Scotland	Race to Dubai	107	23
Scott Jamieson	Scotland	Race to Dubai	111	24
Paul Casey	England	Race to Dubai	101	29
Tommy Fleetwood	England	Race to Dubai	154	32
Simon Khan	England	Race to Dubai	145	38

The following players qualified but did not play: Justin Rose (world ranking - 5), Rory McIlroy (6), Graeme McDowell (11), Luke Donald (15), Lee Westwood (18), Ian Poulter (20) and Martin Laird (59).

Team Continental Europe
Name	Country	Qualification	World Ranking	Race to Dubai
José María Olazábal	Spain	Non-playing captain	—	—
Matteo Manassero	Italy	World Rankings	31	5
Miguel Ángel Jiménez	Spain	World Rankings	45	14
Thomas Bjørn	Denmark	World Rankings	46	8
Francesco Molinari	Italy	World Rankings	47	28
Nicolas Colsaerts	Belgium	World Rankings	51	27
Joost Luiten	Netherlands	Race to Dubai	55	11
Mikko Ilonen	Finland	Race to Dubai	73	16
Thorbjørn Olesen	Denmark	Race to Dubai	49	21
Grégory Bourdy	France	Race to Dubai	121	22
Gonzalo Fernández-Castaño	Spain	Race to Dubai	54	31

The following players qualified but did not play: Henrik Stenson (world ranking - 4), Sergio García (17), Jonas Blixt (35) and Martin Kaymer (42).

== Thursday fourballs ==
3 October 2013

	Results
Bjørn/Jiménez	(United Kingdom) (Republic of Ireland) 3 & 2	Lawrie/Gallacher
Ilonen/Olesen	(Europe) 1 up	Fleetwood/Wood
Molinari/Manassero	halved	Casey/Khan
Luiten/Bourdy	(Europe) 2 & 1	Donaldson/Lynn
Colsaerts/Fdez-Castaño	(Europe) 5 & 3	Warren/Jamieson
3½	Session	1½
3½	Overall	1½

== Friday fourballs ==
4 October 2013

	Results
Ilonen/Olesen	(United Kingdom) (Republic of Ireland) 3 & 2	Casey/Khan
Molinari/Manassero	(United Kingdom) (Republic of Ireland) 1 up	Lynn/Jamieson
Bjørn/Jiménez	(United Kingdom) (Republic of Ireland) 4 & 2	Donaldson/Warren
Luiten/Bourdy	(Europe) 1 up	Fleetwood/Wood
Colsaerts/Fdez-Castaño	(Europe) 6 & 5	Lawrie/Gallacher
2	Session	3
5½	Overall	4½

== Saturday foursomes ==
5 October 2013

=== Morning ===
	Results
Colsaerts/Fdez-Castaño	halved	Lawrie/Gallacher
Luiten/Bourdy	(Europe) 2 & 1	Donaldson/Warren
Olesen/Molinari	(United Kingdom) (Republic of Ireland) 2 & 1	Wood/Jamieson
Jiménez/Manassero	(Europe) 1 up	Casey/Fleetwood
2½	Session	1½
8	Overall	6

=== Afternoon ===
	Results
Colsaerts/Fdez-Castaño	(United Kingdom) (Republic of Ireland) 2 & 1	Lawrie/Gallacher
Bjørn/Ilonen	(United Kingdom) (Republic of Ireland) 2 & 1	Donaldson/Warren
Luiten/Bourdy	(Europe) 2 up	Wood/Jamieson
Jiménez/Manassero	(United Kingdom) (Republic of Ireland) 1 up	Casey/Lynn
1	Session	3
9	Overall	9

== Sunday singles ==
6 October 2013

	Results
Gonzalo Fdez-Castaño	halved	Jamie Donaldson
Nicolas Colsaerts	(Europe) 1 up	Paul Casey
Joost Luiten	(United Kingdom) (Republic of Ireland) 3 & 2	Tommy Fleetwood
Thomas Bjørn	halved	Simon Khan
Grégory Bourdy	(Europe) 5 & 3	Scott Jamieson
Thorbjørn Olesen	(United Kingdom) (Republic of Ireland) 4 & 3	Marc Warren
Matteo Manassero	(Europe) 3 & 2	Stephen Gallacher
Mikko Ilonen	(United Kingdom) (Republic of Ireland) 2 & 1	Paul Lawrie
Miguel Ángel Jiménez	(Europe) 6 & 4	David Lynn
Francesco Molinari	(Europe) 3 & 2	Chris Wood
6	Session	4
15	Overall	13

Simon Khan had to pull out of the event through to injury. Under the rules of the event a half was agreed, while Thomas Bjørn sat out the singles.
