= Vodafone Challenge =

Tournament information
- Location: Düsseldorf, Germany
- Established: 2006
- Course: Golfclub an der Elfrather Mühle
- Par: 72
- Length: 6,869 yards (6,281 m)
- Tour: Challenge Tour
- Format: Stroke play
- Prize fund: €140,000
- Month played: August
- Final year: 2008

Tournament record score
- Aggregate: 270 Martin Kaymer (2006); 270 Joost Luiten (2007)
- To par: −18 as above

Final champion
- (Scotland) Richie Ramsay
- Location in Germany Location in North Rhine-Westphalia

The Vodafone Challenge was a golf tournament on the Challenge Tour from 2006 to 2008. It was played at Golf & Country Club An der Elfrather Mühle in Düsseldorf, Germany.

In 2007, Joost Luiten shot an 11 under par 61 in the final round to win, which set the record for the lowest final round total by a winner of a Challenge Tour event.

== Winners ==
| Year | Winner | Score | To par | Margin of victory | Runner(s)-up |
|---|---|---|---|---|---|
| 2008 | (Scotland) Richie Ramsay | 272 | −16 | 1 stroke | (Germany) Stephan Gross (a) (Scotland) George Murray |
| 2007 | (Netherlands) Joost Luiten | 270 | −18 | 2 strokes | (Sweden) Magnus A. Carlsson |
| 2006 | (Germany) Martin Kaymer | 270 | −18 | 2 strokes | (England) Matthew King (Spain) Álvaro Quirós |
