= Matteo Manassero =

Italian professional golfer (born 1993)

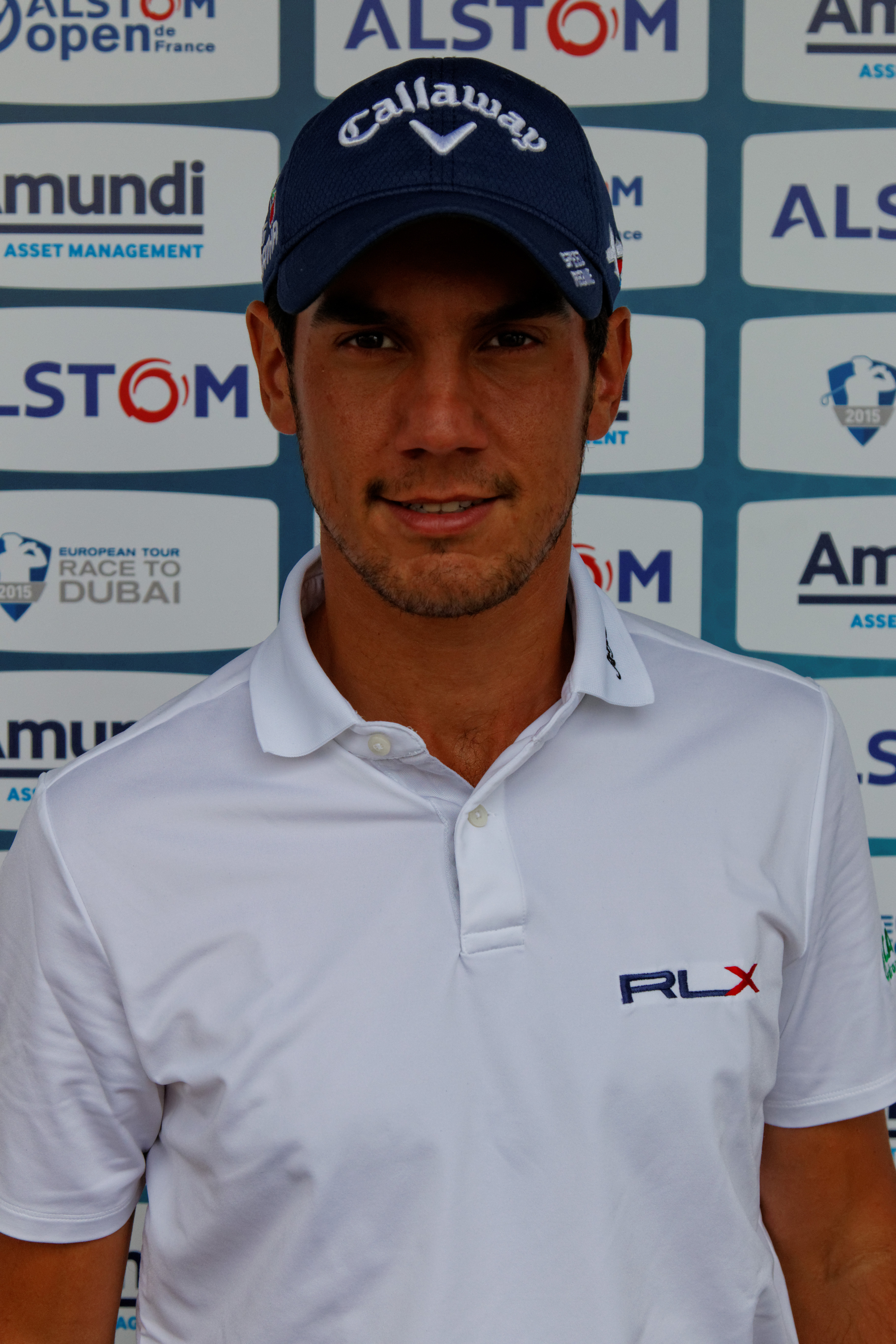
- Manassero in 2015

Personal information
- Full name: Matteo Manassero
- Nickname: Manny
- Nationality: Italy
- Born: 19 April 1993 (age 33) Negrar, Italy
- Height: 1.83 m (6 ft 0 in)
- Weight: 79 kg (174 lb)
- Spouse: Francesca Apollonio (m. 2022)

Career
- Sport: Golf
- Turned professional: 2010
- Current tour: European Tour
- Former tours: PGA Tour; Challenge Tour; Alps Tour
- Professional wins: 8
- Highest ranking: 25 (9 June 2013)

Number of wins by tour
- European Tour: 5
- Asian Tour: 2
- Sunshine Tour: 1
- Challenge Tour: 2
- Other: 1

Best results in major championships
- Masters Tournament: T36: 2010
- PGA Championship: T37: 2011
- U.S. Open: T46: 2012, 2016
- The Open Championship: T13: 2009

Achievements and awards
- Sir Henry Cotton Rookie of the Year: 2010

Matteo Manassero (born 19 April 1993) is an Italian professional golfer who currently plays on the PGA Tour. In 2010, he became the youngest golfer to win a European Tour event. His most notable victory to date was in the 2013 BMW PGA Championship.

== Amateur career ==
Manassero was born in Negrar, in the Province of Verona. After a short period at the Villafranca Golf Club, Manassero learned the game at the Gardagolf Country Club in Soiano del Lago following the lessons of the club pro Franco Maestroni. Manassero is currently the touring pro of Gardagolf.

In 2009, at the age of 16, he became the youngest-ever winner of the British Amateur Championship, defeating England's Sam Hutsby in the final. The win qualified him for the 2009 Open Championship, where, playing alongside Tom Watson and Sergio García in the first two rounds, he made the cut and won the Silver Medal as leading amateur. He eventually finished tied for 13th place.

Manassero topped the World Amateur Golf Rankings on 30 December 2009 and remained number 1 for 18 weeks, until he was removed from the rankings upon turning professional.

On 9 April 2010, Manassero beat Bobby Cole's record, which lasted since 1967, to become the youngest player ever to make the cut at the Masters Tournament, at 16 years and 11 months and 22 days. Manassero was nearly two years younger than Cole was when he made the cut at the 1967 Masters. He was surpassed by Guan Tianlang who, on 12 April 2013, became the youngest player to make the cut in PGA Tour history at 14 years, 5 months of age. Manassero announced that he would turn professional shortly after the Masters and about two weeks after his 17th birthday.

== Professional career ==
=== 2010–2016 ===
Manassero turned pro on 3 May 2010, making his professional debut at the BMW Italian Open. His first win came on 24 October 2010 at the Castelló Masters Costa Azahar in Valencia, Spain, where he triumphed by four strokes over Ignacio Garrido. At age 17, the victory made him the youngest-ever winner on the European Tour, surpassing the record set by Danny Lee at the 2009 Johnnie Walker Classic. The victory also secured his full European Tour playing privileges for the next two seasons. Manassero posted another very strong result when he tied for second in the 2010 UBS Hong Kong Open, one stroke behind winner Ian Poulter. He won the Sir Henry Cotton Rookie of the Year in 2010.

In 2011 Manassero secured his second European Tour win at the Maybank Malaysian Open on 17 April 2011 at the age of 17 years and 363 days, making him first and second on the list of youngest European Tour winners.

In 2012 he managed to further improve his results: in November 2012, after a win at the Barclays Singapore Open, he became the first teenager to win three times on the European Tour. He also collected a second place at the Open de Andalucía Costa del Sol, and five more top 10 placements that earned him the 13th place in the final Order of Merit.

In 2013, Manassero won the biggest tournament of his career to date: the 2013 BMW PGA Championship with a birdie at the fourth extra hole of a playoff against Simon Khan and Marc Warren, becoming the youngest-ever winner of this tournament. With the win Manassero gained the right to play in the 2013 U.S. Open and entered the top 30 of the Official World Golf Ranking. He also managed to further improve his final Order of Merit position with an 11th place.

After collecting a 4th place at the 2014 Aberdeen Asset Management Scottish Open as the sole top 10 result of the season, 2015 proved to be a more difficult year for Manassero in the European Tour, where he was able to make only 6 cuts in 22 competitive starts. He finished 167th in the final Order of Merit, but was able to retain his tour membership in virtue of the win at the 2013 BMW PGA Championship.

After the first round of the 2016 Scottish Open, Manassero opened up to bunkered magazine about "deep lows" he had suffered during his period of struggle. He went on to finish T3 at Castle Stuart, his best result on the European Tour all season.

=== 2020 to present ===
Manassero won his first professional event in seven years at the 2020 Toscana Open on the Alps Tour, two tiers below the European Tour.

Manassero won twice on the 2023 Challenge Tour, finishing ninth on the rankings, securing his return to the European Tour in 2024.

In March 2024, Manassero claimed his first European Tour victory in over 10 years at the Jonsson Workwear Open in South Africa.

== Amateur wins ==
- 2009 The Amateur Championship

== Professional wins (8) ==
=== European Tour wins (5) ===
Legend
Flagship events (1)
Other European Tour (4)

No.	Date	Tournament	Winning score	Margin of victory	Runner(s)-up
1	24 Oct 2010	Castelló Masters Costa Azahar	−16 (68-66-67-67=268)	4 strokes	(Spain) Ignacio Garrido
2	17 Apr 2011	Maybank Malaysian Open^{1}	−16 (66-71-67-68=272)	1 stroke	(France) Grégory Bourdy
3	11 Nov 2012	Barclays Singapore Open^{1}	−13 (70-68-64-69=271)	Playoff	(South Africa) Louis Oosthuizen
4	26 May 2013	BMW PGA Championship	−10 (69-71-69-69=278)	Playoff	(England) Simon Khan, (Scotland) Marc Warren
5	10 Mar 2024	Jonsson Workwear Open^{2}	−26 (68-61-67-66=262)	3 strokes	(South Africa) Thriston Lawrence, (South Africa) Shaun Norris, (England) Jordan Smith

^{1}Co-sanctioned by the Asian Tour
^{2}Co-sanctioned by the Sunshine Tour

European Tour playoff record (2–0)

No.	Year	Tournament	Opponent(s)	Result
1	2012	Barclays Singapore Open	(South Africa) Louis Oosthuizen	Won with eagle on third extra hole
2	2013	BMW PGA Championship	(England) Simon Khan, (Scotland) Marc Warren	Won with birdie on fourth extra hole Warren eliminated by birdie on first hole

=== Challenge Tour wins (2) ===
No.	Date	Tournament	Winning score	Margin of victory	Runner-up
1	28 May 2023	Copenhagen Challenge	−12 (75-64-71-66=276)	1 stroke	(South Africa) Casey Jarvis
2	9 Jul 2023	Italian Challenge Open	−21 (66-65-69-67=267)	3 strokes	(England) Will Enefer

=== Alps Tour wins (1) ===
No.	Date	Tournament	Winning score	Margin of victory	Runner-up
1	19 Sep 2020	Toscana Alps Open	−19 (63-66-65=194)	1 stroke	(Spain) Ángel Hidalgo

== Results in major championships ==
Tournament	2009	2010	2011	2012	2013	2014	2015	2016	2017	2018
Masters Tournament		T36_{LA}			CUT	CUT				
U.S. Open			T54	T46	CUT			T46		
The Open Championship	T13_{LA}		CUT		CUT	T19	CUT	CUT		
PGA Championship			T37	CUT	T72	CUT				

Tournament	2019	2020	2021	2022	2023	2024	2025
Masters Tournament							
PGA Championship							
U.S. Open						CUT	
The Open Championship		NT				T31	CUT

Did not play

LA = low amateur
CUT = missed the half-way cut
"T" indicates a tie for a place
NT = no tournament

=== Summary ===
Tournament	Wins	2nd	3rd	Top-5	Top-10	Top-25	Events	Cuts made
Masters Tournament	0	0	0	0	0	0	3	1
U.S. Open	0	0	0	0	0	0	5	3
The Open Championship	0	0	0	0	0	2	8	3
PGA Championship	0	0	0	0	0	0	4	2
Totals	0	0	0	0	0	2	20	9

- Most consecutive cuts made – 3 (2009 Open Championship – 2011 U.S. Open)
- Longest streak of top-10s – 0

== Results in The Players Championship ==
Tournament	2011
The Players Championship	T64

"T" indicates a tie for a place

== Results in World Golf Championships ==
Tournament	2010	2011	2012	2013	2014
Match Play		R16	R32	R64	R32
Championship				T23	T60
Invitational		T37		T53	
Champions	T53	69		T21	

Top 10
Did not play

QF, R16, R32, R64 = Round in which player lost in match play
"T" = tied

== Team appearances ==
Amateur

- European Boys' Team Championship (representing Italy): 2007, 2008
- Jacques Léglise Trophy (representing Continental Europe): 2007, 2008
- European Amateur Team Championship (representing Italy): 2008, 2009
- Junior Ryder Cup (representing Europe): 2008

Professional

- Royal Trophy (representing Europe): 2011 (winners)
- Seve Trophy (representing Continental Europe): 2011, 2013 (winners)
- World Cup (representing Italy): 2013, 2016
- Team Cup (representing Continental Europe): 2025

== See also ==
- 2023 Challenge Tour graduates
- 2024 Race to Dubai dual card winners
