= Francesco Molinari =

Italian professional golfer

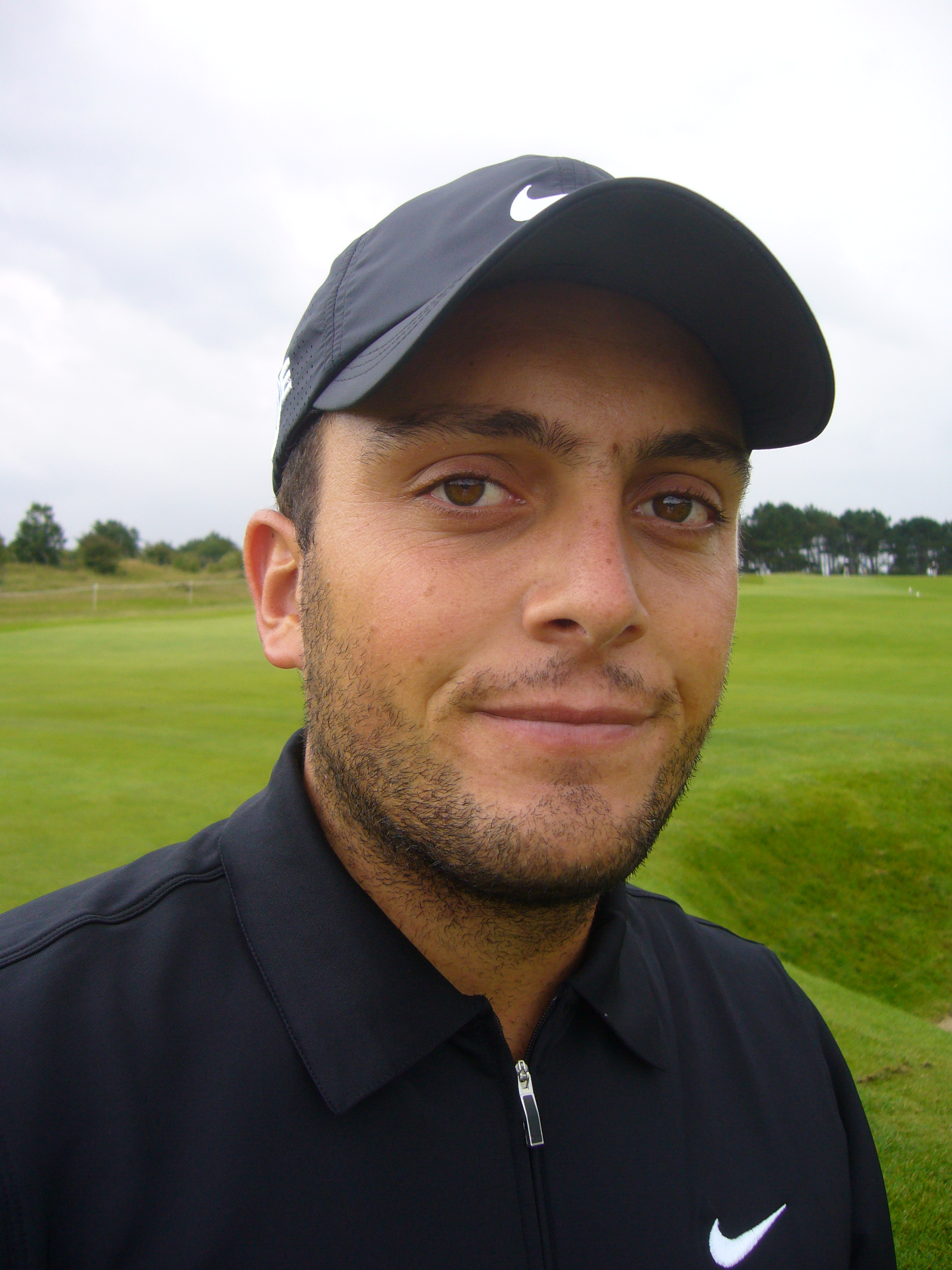
- Molinari in 2008

Personal information
- Nationality: Italy
- Born: 8 November 1982 (age 43) Turin, Italy
- Height: 1.72 m (5 ft 8 in)
- Weight: 72 kg (159 lb; 11.3 st)
- Spouse: Valentina (m. 2007)
- Children: 2

Career
- Sport: Golf
- College: University of Turin
- Turned professional: 2004
- Current tours: European Tour; PGA Tour
- Professional wins: 10
- Highest ranking: 5 (9 September 2018)

Number of wins by tour
- PGA Tour: 3
- European Tour: 6
- Other: 2

Best results in major championships (wins: 1)
- Masters Tournament: T5: 2019
- PGA Championship: T2: 2017
- U.S. Open: T13: 2021
- The Open Championship: Won: 2018

Achievements and awards
- European Tour Race to Dubai winner: 2018
- European Tour Golfer of the Year: 2018
- European Tour Players' Player of the Year: 2018
- BBC World Sport Star of the Year: 2018
- Golden Collar of Sports Merit: 2018

Francesco Molinari (born 8 November 1982) is an Italian professional golfer. He won the 2018 Open Championship, his first and only major victory, and the first major won by an Italian professional golfer. The Open Championship win capped a successful season in which he won the 2018 BMW PGA Championship, his fifth win on the European Tour, and the Quicken Loans National, his first PGA Tour win. At the end of the season, Molinari won 5 out of 5 points as Europe won the 2018 Ryder Cup.

In 2019, Molinari won the Arnold Palmer Invitational for the third PGA Tour victory of his career. Playing with his brother Edoardo, they won the 2009 Omega Mission Hills World Cup, Italy's only win in the event. Molinari won the 2010 WGC-HSBC Champions and has represented Europe in three winning Ryder Cup teams, in 2010, 2012 and 2018. Molinari was in the top 100 of the Official World Golf Ranking continuously from November 2008 to November 2020.

== Early life and amateur career ==
Molinari was born on 8 November 1982 in Turin, Italy. He is the younger brother of Edoardo Molinari. As an amateur, he won the Italian Amateur Stroke Play Championship twice and the Italian Match Play Championship in 2004. Molinari turned professional later that year. Molinari graduated from the University of Turin with a degree in economics.

== Professional career ==
Molinari earned his European Tour card for 2005 through qualifying school. He finished in 86th place on the tour's Order of Merit in his rookie season. In May 2006, Molinari claimed his first European Tour victory, becoming the first Italian since Massimo Mannelli in 1980 to win the Telecom Italia Open. This victory helped him finish 38th on the Order of Merit. He did not win on Tour between 2007 and 2009, but during that time, he recorded twenty top-10 finishes, including three runner-up finishes. He finished 60th on the Order of Merit in 2007, 24th in 2008 and 14th in the Race to Dubai in 2009. In October 2009, Molinari reached the top 50 of the Official World Golf Ranking for the first time. On 29 November 2009, Molinari, along with his older brother Edoardo, led Italy to their first World Cup victory at the Omega Mission Hills World Cup in China.

On 7 November 2010, Molinari won the WGC-HSBC Champions in Shanghai, China. He defeated Lee Westwood by one stroke, finishing at 19-under par. The win moved him into 14th in the Official World Golf Ranking, his highest ranking for eight years. He also recorded eleven top-10 finishes, including two runner-up finishes en route to a 5th-place finish in the Race to Dubai. In October 2010, Molinari represented Europe in the 2010 Ryder Cup which took place at Celtic Manor Resort, teaming up with his brother Edoardo in the four-balls (halved against Stuart Cink and Matt Kuchar) and foursomes (lost against Zach Johnson and Hunter Mahan). He then lost the singles match by 4 and 3 against Tiger Woods on the final day. Europe defeated the United States, 14 1/2–13 1/2. Molinari had a steady 2011 without any further victories but did record seven top-10 finishes, including a 3rd place at the WGC-Cadillac Championship. He finished the year ranked 21st in the Race to Dubai.

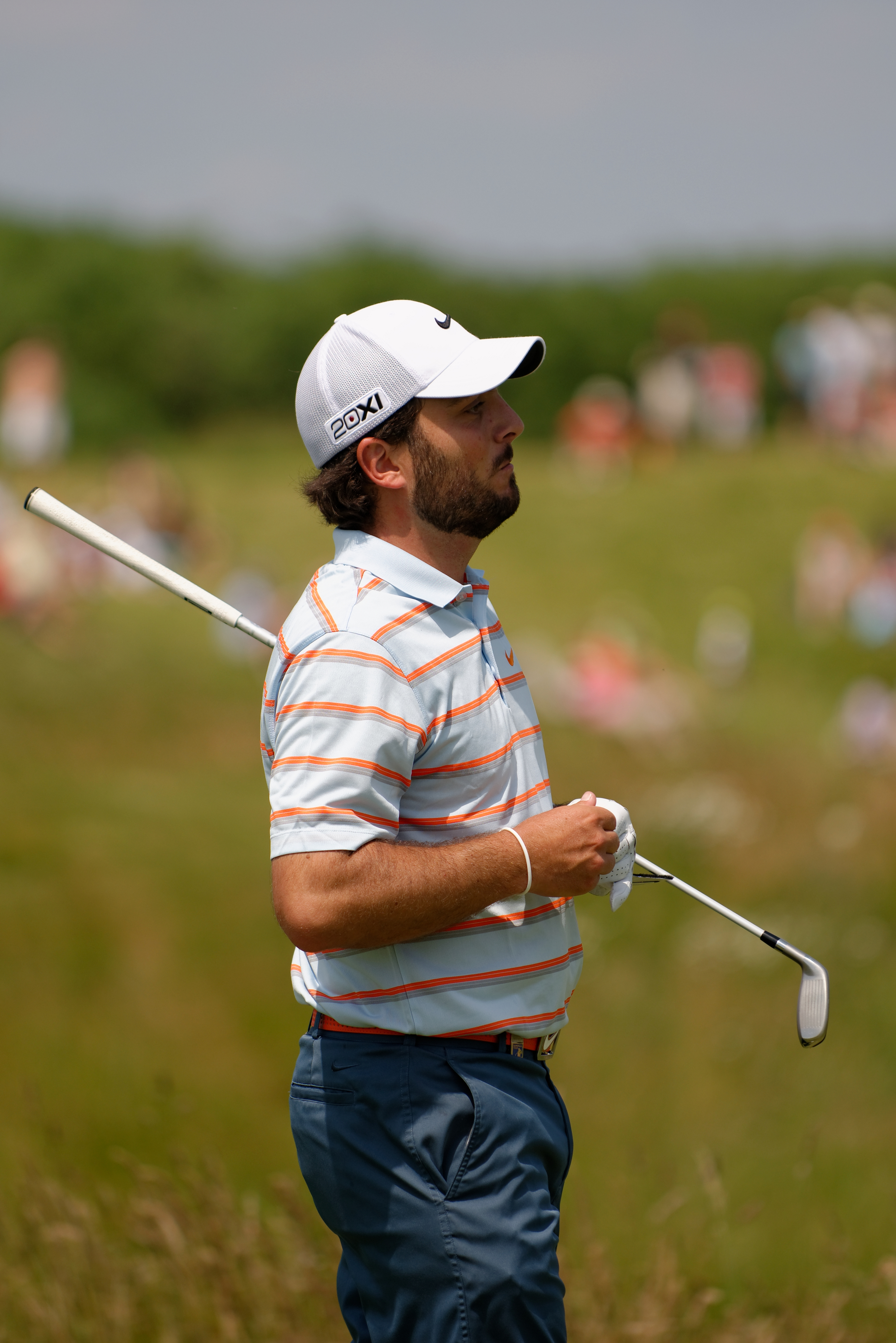
Molinari at the 2013 Open de France

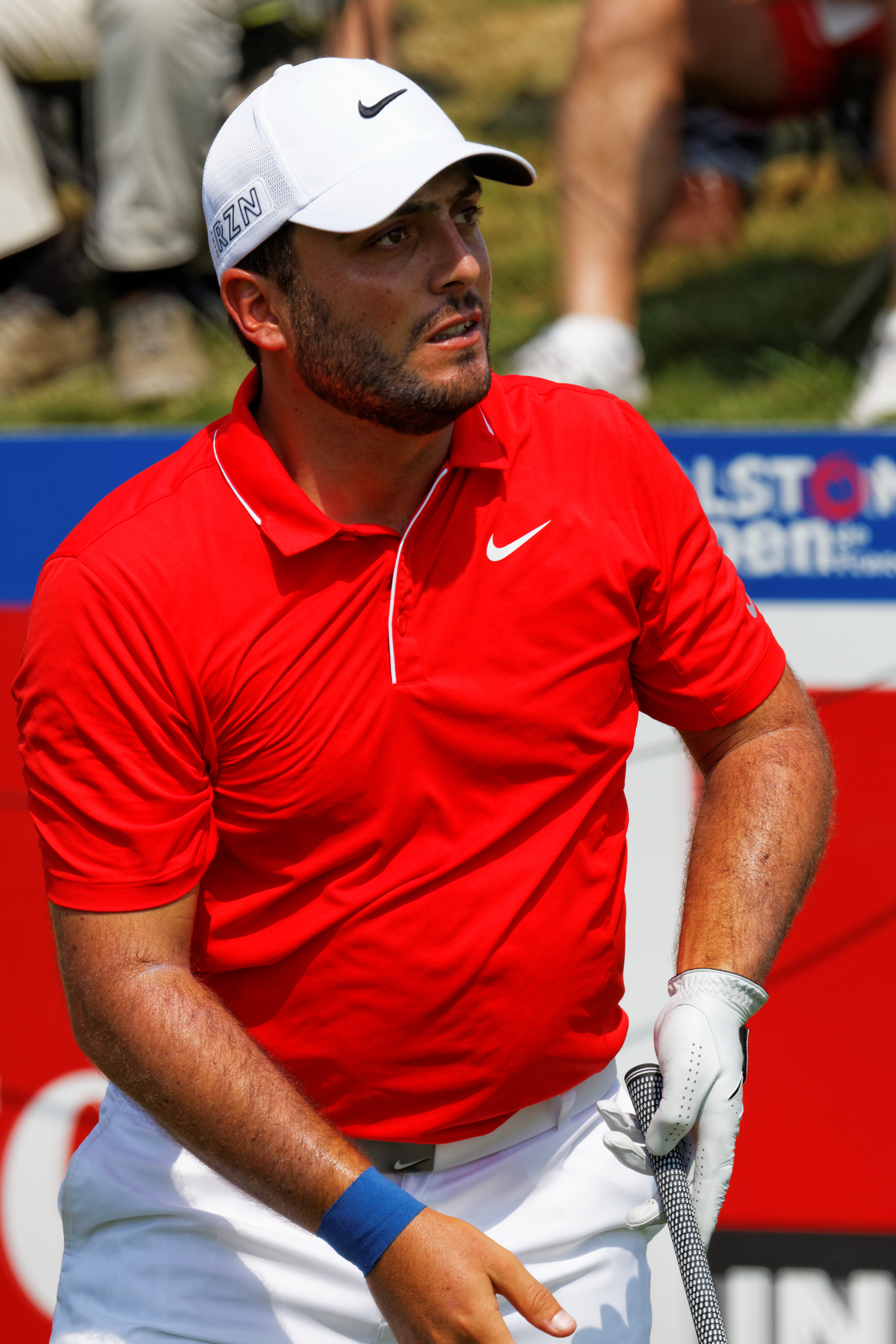
Molinari at the 2015 Open de France

Molinari picked up his third win on the European Tour on 6 May 2012 at the Reale Seguros Open de España. He was four strokes out of the lead going into the final round but fired a 65 (−7), the best round of the tournament, to win by three strokes over Alejandro Cañizares, Søren Kjeldsen and Pablo Larrazábal. In July 2012, the week before the Open Championship, Molinari lost in a playoff at the Aberdeen Asset Management Scottish Open. He was defeated on the first playoff hole by Jeev Milkha Singh.

Molinari gained an automatic selection for the 2012 Ryder Cup, where he played the foursomes with Lee Westwood on Friday, losing by 3 and 2 to Jason Dufner and Zach Johnson; he then teamed up in the four-balls with Justin Rose, losing by 5 and 4 against Bubba Watson and Webb Simpson. On the final day, he halved with Tiger Woods in the last singles match. The point meant Europe not only completed a comeback from 10–6 down at the start of the final day to retain the cup, but also won it outright by a score of 14 1/2 points to 13 1/2. During the 2013 and 2014 seasons Molinari did not register a tournament win, but his steady position in the top fifty of the OWGR allowed him to play several PGA Tour events as a non-member, where he reached three top ten finishes; among these the most prestigious result was the 6th place at the 2014 Players Championship. These results allowed him to earn a full PGA Tour card for the 2014–15 season.

In 2015 and 2016, Molinari shared his time between the European Tour and the PGA Tour. In September 2016, he became the first Italian to win his national open twice with a 1 shot victory over Danny Willett at the 2016 Italian Open. Other notable results in Europe were the 2nd places collected at the 2015 Open de España and 2016 Open de France, while in the U.S., he collected a 3rd place at the 2015 Memorial Tournament. In the same year he also recorded a hole in one at the iconic 16th hole of the Waste Management Phoenix Open.

Molinari recorded his fifth European Tour win and first Rolex Series title in May 2018, with victory in the European Tour's flagship event, the BMW PGA Championship. He produced a flawless final round to see off Rory McIlroy by two strokes. The win took Molinari level with Costantino Rocca for most European Tour wins by an Italian. In the same year, Molinari won the Quicken Loans National in a dominating fashion by shooting a 62 on Sunday to win by eight strokes, the first PGA Tour win for an Italian since 1947. At the 2018 Open Championship, Molinari won the tournament with a score of −8, pairing with Tiger Woods in the final round. The win at the Open Championship moved him to sixth place in the Official World Golf Ranking, the highest ranking of his career to date.

In September 2018, Molinari qualified for the European team participating in the 2018 Ryder Cup. Europe defeated the U.S. team 17 1/2 to 10 1/2. Molinari became the first player ever to go 5–0–0. He paired with Tommy Fleetwood to win all four fourball and foursome matches. He also won his singles match against Phil Mickelson. On 18 November 2018, Molinari won the season-long Race to Dubai title on the European Tour. The victory was worth $1,250,000.

On 10 March 2019, Molinari won the Arnold Palmer Invitational for the third PGA Tour victory of his career. He teed off 10 groups ahead of the leaders on the final day and 5 strokes behind, making three birdies and no bogeys on his first seven holes. On the 8th hole, from well off the green, he holed a chip for another birdie and made the turn in 32 (−4). He made four more birdies on the back nine, including a 43-foot putt at the 72nd hole, to shoot a final-round 64 that ended up giving him a two-stroke win over Matt Fitzpatrick, who shot a final-round 71. In April 2019, Molinari was the 54-hole leader at the Masters at 13 under, two strokes clear of Tony Finau and Tiger Woods, after a six-under-par 66 in the third round. Molinari held the lead for two-thirds of the final round until he reached the par-3 12th, where his tee shot found the water, resulting in a double bogey. He found the water again on the 15th, which led to another double bogey to fall out of contention. He finished with a round of 74 and T5 finish, is still his best performance at the Masters to date.

Molinari has worked since 2018 with Dave Alred on several mental aspects of his game. Molinari is an ambassador for Borne, a medical research charity looking to identify the causes of premature birth.

== Personal life ==
Molinari is a fan of Italian football team Internazionale. He also supports West Ham United after Italian football manager Gianfranco Zola started managing the east London side in 2008.

== Awards and honours ==
In 2018, Molinari earned the season-long Race to Dubai title for the European Tour. He also won the European Tour Golfer of the Year award, as well as the European Tour Players' Player of the Year. During the same year, Molinari received the Golden Collar of Sports Merit and the BBC World Sport Star of the Year award, which was formerly known as the BBC Overseas Sports Personality of the Year award. He was the first Italian to receive this prize.

== Amateur wins ==
- 2002 Italian Amateur Stroke Play Championship, Italian Amateur Foursomes Championship (with Edoardo Molinari)
- 2004 Italian Amateur Stroke Play Championship, Italian Match Play Championship, Sherry Cup

== Professional wins (10) ==
=== PGA Tour wins (3) ===
Legend
Major championships (1)
Other PGA Tour (2)

No.	Date	Tournament	Winning score	To par	Margin of victory	Runner(s)-up
1	1 Jul 2018	Quicken Loans National	67-65-65-62=259	−21	8 strokes	(United States) Ryan Armour
2	22 Jul 2018	The Open Championship	70-72-65-69=276	−8	2 strokes	(United States) Kevin Kisner, (Northern Ireland) Rory McIlroy, (England) Justin Rose, (United States) Xander Schauffele
3	10 Mar 2019	Arnold Palmer Invitational	69-70-73-64=276	−12	2 strokes	(England) Matt Fitzpatrick

=== European Tour wins (6) ===
Legend
Major championships (1)
World Golf Championships (1)
Flagship events (1)
Rolex Series (1) (Note: The 2018 BMW PGA Championship was also a Rolex Series tournament.)
Other European Tour (3)

No.	Date	Tournament	Winning score	To par	Margin of victory	Runner(s)-up
1	7 May 2006	Telecom Italia Open	68-65-67-65=265	−23	4 strokes	(Denmark) Anders Hansen, (Sweden) Jarmo Sandelin
2	7 Nov 2010	WGC-HSBC Champions (Note: The 2010 WGC-HSBC Champions is not counted as a PGA Tour win because Molinari was not a PGA Tour member at the time.)	65-70-67-67=269	−19	1 stroke	(England) Lee Westwood
3	6 May 2012	Reale Seguros Open de España	70-71-74-65=280	−8	3 strokes	(Spain) Alejandro Cañizares, (Denmark) Søren Kjeldsen, (Spain) Pablo Larrazábal
4	18 Sep 2016	Italian Open (2)	65-68-64-65=262	−22	1 stroke	(England) Danny Willett
5	27 May 2018	BMW PGA Championship	70-67-66-68=271	−17	2 strokes	(Northern Ireland) Rory McIlroy
6	22 Jul 2018	The Open Championship	70-72-65-69=276	−8	2 strokes	(United States) Kevin Kisner, (Northern Ireland) Rory McIlroy, (England) Justin Rose, (United States) Xander Schauffele

European Tour playoff record (0–3)

No.	Year	Tournament	Opponent(s)	Result
1	2008	UBS Hong Kong Open	(Taiwan) Lin Wen-tang, (Northern Ireland) Rory McIlroy	Lin won with birdie on second extra hole Molinari eliminated by birdie on first hole
2	2010	Alstom Open de France	(Spain) Alejandro Cañizares, (Spain) Miguel Ángel Jiménez	Jiménez won with par on first extra hole
3	2012	Aberdeen Asset Management Scottish Open	(India) Jeev Milkha Singh	Lost to birdie on first extra hole

=== Other wins (2) ===
No.	Date	Tournament	Winning score	To par	Margin of victory	Runners-up
1	10 Apr 2009	Italian PGA Championship	70-65-67-70=272	−16	6 strokes	(Italy) Gregory Molteni, (Italy) Andrea Perrino, (Italy) Michele Reale
2	29 Nov 2009	Omega Mission Hills World Cup (with (Italy) Edoardo Molinari)	64-66-61-68=259	−29	1 stroke	Ireland − Graeme McDowell and Rory McIlroy, Sweden − Robert Karlsson and Henrik Stenson

== Major championships ==
=== Wins (1) ===
Year	Championship	54 holes	Winning score	Margin	Runners-up
2018	The Open Championship	3 shot deficit	−8 (70-72-65-69=276)	2 strokes	(United States) Kevin Kisner, (Northern Ireland) Rory McIlroy, (England) Justin Rose, (United States) Xander Schauffele

=== Results timeline ===
Tournament	2007	2008	2009
Masters Tournament			
U.S. Open			T27
The Open Championship	CUT		T13
PGA Championship			T10

Tournament	2010	2011	2012	2013	2014	2015	2016	2017	2018
Masters Tournament	T30	CUT	T19	CUT	50			T33	T20
U.S. Open	CUT	CUT	T29	CUT	T23	T27		CUT	T25
The Open Championship	CUT	CUT	T39	T9	T15	T40	T36	CUT	1
PGA Championship	T33	T34	T54	T33	T58	T54	T22	T2	T6

Tournament	2019	2020	2021	2022	2023	2024	2025	2026
Masters Tournament	T5	CUT	52	CUT	CUT			
PGA Championship	T48			T55	CUT	CUT		
U.S. Open	T16		T13	CUT	CUT	T64		
The Open Championship	T11	NT	CUT	T15	CUT	CUT	T63	T46

Win
Top 10
Did not play

CUT = missed the half-way cut
"T" = tied
NT = no tournament due to COVID-19 pandemic

=== Summary ===
Tournament	Wins	2nd	3rd	Top-5	Top-10	Top-25	Events	Cuts made
Masters Tournament	0	0	0	1	1	3	12	7
PGA Championship	0	1	0	1	3	4	14	12
U.S. Open	0	0	0	0	0	4	14	8
The Open Championship	1	0	0	1	2	6	18	11
Totals	1	1	0	3	6	17	58	38

- Most consecutive cuts made – 12 (2013 Open – 2017 Masters)
- Longest streak of top-10s – 3 (2018 Open – 2019 Masters)

== Results in The Players Championship ==
Tournament	2010	2011	2012	2013	2014	2015	2016	2017	2018	2019
The Players Championship	9	CUT	CUT	CUT	T6		T7	T6	CUT	T56

Tournament	2020	2021	2022	2023	2024
The Players Championship	C	CUT	T42	T60	T54

Top 10
Did not play

CUT = missed the halfway cut
"T" indicates a tie for a place
C = Cancelled after the first round due to the COVID-19 pandemic

== World Golf Championships ==
=== Wins (1) ===
Year	Championship	54 holes	Winning score	Margin	Runner-up
2010	WGC-HSBC Champions	1 shot lead	−19 (65-70-67-67=269)	1 stroke	(England) Lee Westwood

=== Results timeline ===
Results not in chronological order prior to 2015.

Tournament	2009	2010	2011	2012	2013	2014	2015	2016	2017	2018	2019	2020
Championship		T14	T3	T13	T28	T25			T20	T25	T17	T53
Match Play		R64	R64	R32	R64	R64	T34		T58	T17	3	NT^{1}
Invitational		T39	T15	T40	T44	T31	T61		T24	T39		
Champions	T10	1	T23	T39	T21			T6	T46	T43	T22	NT^{1}

^{1}Cancelled due to COVID-19 pandemic

Win
Top 10
Did not play

QF, R16, R32, R64 = Round in which player lost in match play
NT = No tournament
"T" = Tied

== PGA Tour career summary ==
Season	Starts	Cuts made	Wins	2nd	3rd	Top 10	Top 25	Earnings ($)	Money list rank
2007	1	0	0	0	0	0	0	0	n/a
2008	0	0	0	0	0	0	0	0	n/a
2009	4	4	0	0	0	1	2	304,368	n/a
2010	8	6	0	0	0	1	2	358,196	n/a
2011	11	6	0	0	1	1	3	158,387	n/a
2012	8	7	0	0	0	0	3	198,961	n/a
2013	9	6	0	0	0	1	1	245,463	n/a
2014	12	12	0	0	0	2	7	847,974	n/a
2015	16	13	0	0	1	2	5	997,389	103
2016	18	14	0	0	0	3	5	1,083,155	98
2017	21	17	0	1	0	5	14	2,875,850	31
2018	20	17	2	1	0	5	11	5,065,842	11
2019	15	14	1	0	1	3	6	3,467,143	11
2020	6	3	0	0	0	0	2	183,740	193
2021	15	7	0	0	0	3	5	996,777	126
2022	17	10	0	0	0	1	3	816,460	143
2023	18	6	0	0	0	0	2	566,848	167
2024	15	6	0	0	0	0	1	259,679	184
2025	15	8	0	0	0	0	0	219,875	190
2026	2	2	0	0	0	0	1	175,457	178
Career	231	158	3	2	3	28	73	18,821,766	124

^ Molinari became member of the PGA Tour in 2015, so he is not included in the money list before that.

== Team appearances ==
Amateur

- European Boys' Team Championship (representing Italy): 1999
- European Youths' Team Championship (representing Italy): 2000
- European Amateur Team Championship (representing Italy): 2001, 2003
- Eisenhower Trophy (representing Italy): 2002, 2004
- Bonallack Trophy (representing Europe): 2004
- Palmer Cup (representing Europe): 2004 (winners)
- St Andrews Trophy (representing the Continent of Europe): 2004

Professional

- World Cup (representing Italy): 2006, 2007, 2008, 2009 (winners), 2011, 2013, 2016
- Seve Trophy (representing Continental Europe): 2009, 2011, 2013 (winners)
- Ryder Cup (representing Europe): 2010 (winners), 2012 (winners), 2018 (winners)
- Royal Trophy (representing Europe): 2012
- Team Cup (representing Continental Europe): 2023 (playing captain, winners), 2025 (playing captain)

Ryder Cup points record

2010	2012	2014	2016	2018	Total
0.5	0.5	-	-	5	6

== Honours ==
=== Orders ===
CONI: Golden Collar of Sports Merit Collare d'Oro al Merito Sportivo: 2018

== Notes ==
Awards
Preceded by (Switzerland) Roger Federer	BBC World Sport Star of the Year; 2018	Succeeded by (Kenya) Eliud Kipchoge
