= Simon Khan =

English professional golfer

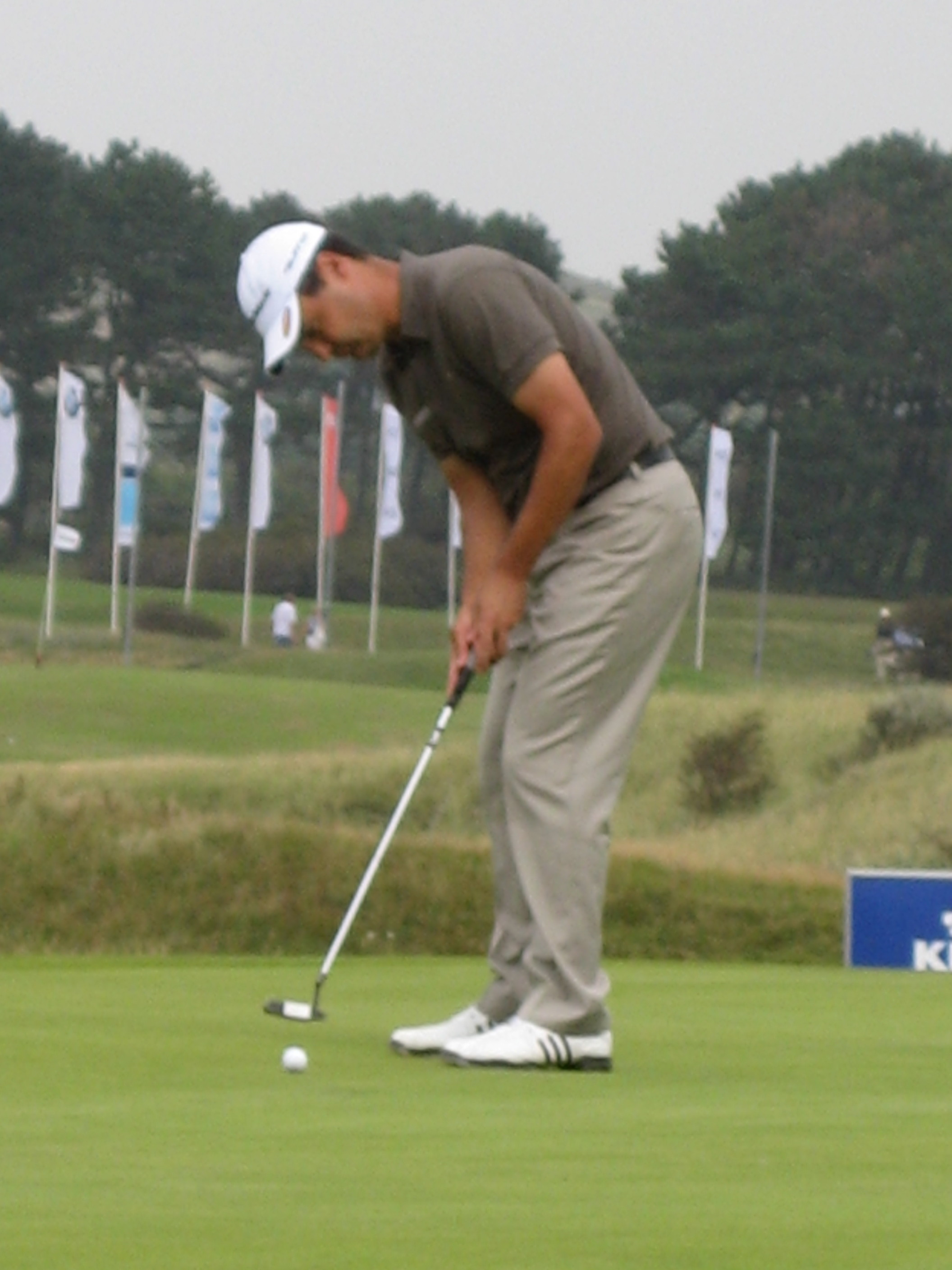

Personal information
- Full name: Simon Patrick Khan
- Nationality: England
- Born: 16 June 1972 (age 54) Chingford, England
- Height: 6 ft 3 in (1.91 m)
- Weight: 196 lb (89 kg; 14.0 st)
- Spouse: Lesley (m. 2002)
- Children: 1

Career
- Sport: Golf
- Turned professional: 1991
- Current tour: European Senior Tour
- Former tours: European Tour; Challenge Tour
- Professional wins: 5
- Highest ranking: 69 (13 August 2006)

Number of wins by tour
- European Tour: 2
- Other: 3

Best results in major championships
- Masters Tournament: DNP
- PGA Championship: T24: 2010
- U.S. Open: 72nd: 2013
- The Open Championship: T31: 2006

Simon Patrick Khan (born 16 June 1972) is an English professional golfer who plays on the European Tour.

== Career ==
In 1991, Khan turned professional. He spent many years struggling to establish his tournament career. His first full season on the European Tour was 2002 and his first European Tour win came at the 2004 Celtic Manor Wales Open. In 2006 he finished second at the prestigious BMW Championship to earn €472,220, which was his biggest prize cheque up to that time.

His best year-end ranking on the European Order of Merit has been 25th in 2006 and 2010. He has featured in the top 100 of the Official World Golf Rankings. After losing his tour card in 2009, Khan was a medalist at the Qualifying School tournament. In 2010 he won the BMW PGA Championship, earning €750,000 and securing his Tour card for five years in the process.

Khan produced another fine run at the BMW PGA Championship in 2013, when he recorded the second runner-up finish of his career, to add to his 2010 victory, at Wentworth. After finishing at 10 under par, Khan entered a three-man playoff alongside Matteo Manassero and Marc Warren. In the playoff, Warren was eliminated at the first extra hole and after matching pars and birdies, Khan was defeated on the fourth extra hole by Manassero. After a good drive, Khan knocked his second shot into the water and could only make a bogey six and Manassero after two fine shots onto the green, two-putted for the victory.

== Professional wins (5) ==
=== European Tour wins (2) ===
Legend
Flagship events (1)
Other European Tour (1)

No.	Date	Tournament	Winning score	Margin of victory	Runner(s)-up
1	6 Jun 2004	Celtic Manor Wales Open	−21 (69-61-70-67=267)	Playoff	(England) Paul Casey
2	23 May 2010	BMW PGA Championship	−6 (72-69-71-66=278)	1 stroke	(Sweden) Fredrik Andersson Hed, (England) Luke Donald

European Tour playoff record (1–1)

No.	Year	Tournament	Opponent(s)	Result
1	2004	Celtic Manor Wales Open	(England) Paul Casey	Won with birdie on second extra hole
2	2013	BMW PGA Championship	(Italy) Matteo Manassero, (Scotland) Marc Warren	Manassero won with birdie on fourth extra hole Warren eliminated by birdie on first hole

=== Other wins (3) ===
- 1996 Essex Open
- 1999 East Region Championship
- 2000 Essex Open

== Playoff record ==
Challenge Tour playoff record (0–1)

No.	Year	Tournament	Opponent	Result
1	2000	Formby Hall Challenge	(Sweden) Fredrik Henge	Lost to birdie on first extra hole

== Results in major championships ==
Tournament	2000	2001	2002	2003	2004	2005	2006	2007	2008	2009
U.S. Open										CUT
The Open Championship	CUT					T41	T31		T39	
PGA Championship							CUT			

Tournament	2010	2011	2012	2013
U.S. Open	CUT			72
The Open Championship	T55	T38	T45	
PGA Championship	T24			

Note: Khan never played in the Masters Tournament.

Did not play

CUT = missed the half-way cut
"T" = tied

== Results in World Golf Championships ==
Tournament	2010
Match Play	
Championship	
Invitational	T76
Champions	T69

Did not play

"T" = Tied

== Team appearances ==
Professional

- Seve Trophy (representing Great Britain & Ireland): 2013

== See also ==
- 2009 European Tour Qualifying School graduates
