= Richie Ramsay =

Scottish golfer

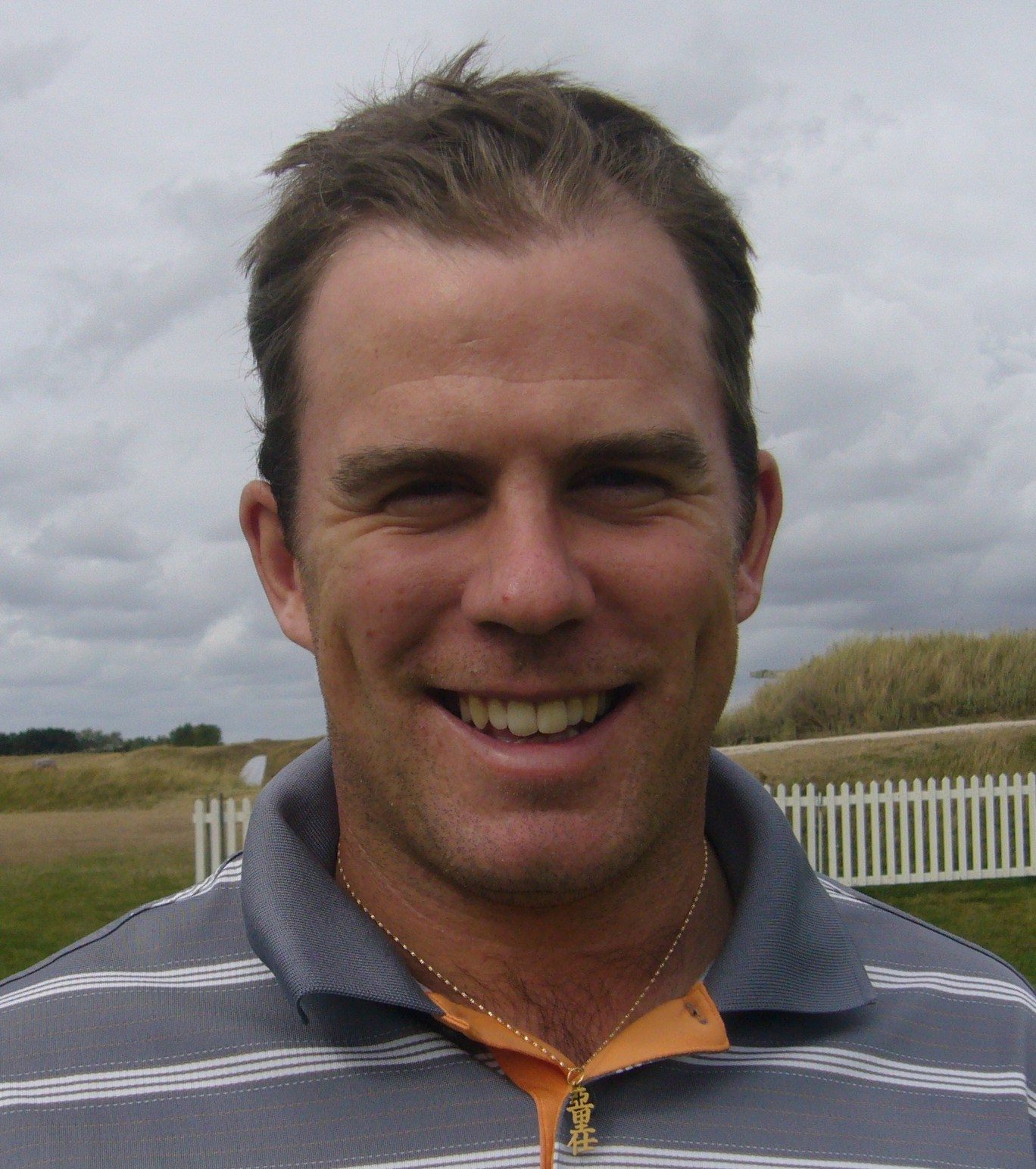

Personal information
- Nationality: Scotland
- Born: 15 June 1983 (age 43) Aberdeen, Scotland
- Height: 5 ft 9 in (1.75 m)
- Weight: 154 lb (70 kg; 11.0 st)
- Spouse: Angela (m. 2012)
- Children: 1

Career
- Sport: Golf
- College: McLennan Community College; Stirling University
- Turned professional: 2007
- Current tour: European Tour
- Former tour: Challenge Tour
- Professional wins: 6
- Highest ranking: 52 (21 October 2012)

Number of wins by tour
- European Tour: 4
- Asian Tour: 1
- Sunshine Tour: 1
- Challenge Tour: 2

Best results in major championships
- Masters Tournament: CUT: 2007
- PGA Championship: CUT: 2013, 2015
- U.S. Open: CUT: 2007, 2017, 2018
- The Open Championship: T22: 2017

Richie Ramsay (born 15 June 1983) is a Scottish professional golfer who plays on the European Tour.

Ramsay played in the 2005 Walker Cup and, in 2006, became the first British golfer in almost a century to win the U.S. Amateur.

Ramsay turned professional in 2007, and played two seasons on the second tier Challenge Tour, winning twice in 2008. He has played on the European Tour since 2009, winning three times.

== Early life ==
In 1983, Ramsay was born in Aberdeen, Scotland. He is an honorary member of Royal Aberdeen Golf Club and attended Hazlehead Academy before becoming a student at Stirling University in Scotland, where he graduated in 2007.

== Amateur career ==
Ramsay won the Scottish Amateur Open Stroke Play Championship in 2004, and the Irish Amateur Open Championship in 2005. He went on to represent Great Britain & Ireland in the Walker Cup later that year.

In 2006, Ramsay won the U.S. Amateur, defeating American John Kelly 4 & 2 in the 36-hole final. He was the first British player to win the championship since 1911, and the first Scot since 1898. He topped the first edition of the World Amateur Golf Ranking, which was issued by the R&A on 23 January 2007.

After playing in the 2007 Masters Tournament, U.S. Open and Open Championship, for which he had qualified through his U.S. Amateur victory, Ramsay turned professional.

== Professional career ==
In 2007, Ramsay made his professional debut at the European Tour's Russian Open. He finished that event in a tie for 53rd place, and completed the remainder of the season playing tournaments on the second tier Challenge Tour. Having failed to come through final qualifying school at the end of the season, he again played on the Challenge Tour in 2008. He won his first professional tournaments during the 2008 season, the Vodafone Challenge in Germany and the AGF-Allianz Golf Open Grand Toulouse. He ended the year in 8th place on the Challenge Tour Rankings to graduate directly to the European Tour for 2009.

In 2009, Ramsay finished the season inside the top 100 of the Race to Dubai and secured his tour card for 2010. At the second event of the 2010 season, held at the end of 2009, he won his first title on the European Tour by defeating Shiv Kapur in a playoff for the South African Open Championship.

By 2011, Ramsay was firmly established on the European Tour with 6 top ten finishes taking him to the top 30 of the Order of Merit for the first time.

In September 2012, Ramsay won the Omega European Masters in Crans-Montana, Switzerland. He shot a final-round 66 to win by four shots. The following month Ramsay finished runner-up at the Hero Indian Open on the Asian Tour. He was defeated in a sudden-death playoff by Thaworn Wiratchant.

In March 2015, Ramsay won the Trophée Hassan II, winning by one shot over Romain Wattel and claiming his third European Tour victory.

In July 2022, Ramsay won the Cazoo Classic at Hillside Golf Club. He shot a final-round 69 to win by one shot over Paul Waring. It was his first victory in over 7 years.

== Amateur wins ==
- 2004 Scottish Amateur Open Stroke Play Championship
- 2005 Irish Amateur Open Championship
- 2006 U.S. Amateur

== Professional wins (6) ==
=== European Tour wins (4) ===
No.	Date	Tournament	Winning score	Margin of victory	Runner(s)-up
1	20 Dec 2009 (2010 season)	South African Open Championship^{1}	−13 (67-75-68-65=275)	Playoff	(India) Shiv Kapur
2	2 Sep 2012	Omega European Masters^{2}	−17 (69-68-64-66=267)	4 strokes	(Sweden) Fredrik Andersson Hed, (Australia) Marcus Fraser, (France) Romain Wattel, (England) Danny Willett
3	29 Mar 2015	Trophée Hassan II	−10 (72-66-71-69=278)	1 stroke	(France) Romain Wattel
4	24 Jul 2022	Cazoo Classic	−14 (69-69-67-69=274)	1 stroke	(England) Paul Waring

^{1}Co-sanctioned by the Sunshine Tour
^{2}Co-sanctioned by the Asian Tour

European Tour playoff record (1–0)

No.	Year	Tournament	Opponent	Result
1	2009	South African Open Championship	(India) Shiv Kapur	Won with par on first extra hole

=== Asian Tour wins (1) ===
No.	Date	Tournament	Winning score	Margin of victory	Runners-up
1	2 Sep 2012	Omega European Masters^{1}	−16 (69-68-64-66=267)	4 strokes	(Sweden) Fredrik Andersson Hed, (Australia) Marcus Fraser, (France) Romain Wattel, (England) Danny Willett

^{1}Co-sanctioned by the European Tour

Asian Tour playoff record (0–1)

No.	Year	Tournament	Opponent	Result
1	2012	Hero Indian Open	(Thailand) Thaworn Wiratchant	Lost to bogey on first extra hole

=== Challenge Tour wins (2) ===
No.	Date	Tournament	Winning score	Margin of victory	Runner(s)-up
1	17 Aug 2008	Vodafone Challenge	−16 (65-70-69-68=272)	1 stroke	(Germany) Stephan Gross (a), (Scotland) George Murray
2	5 Oct 2008	AGF-Allianz Golf Open Grand Toulouse	−19 (67-70-64-68=269)	2 strokes	(England) Richard McEvoy

== Results in major championships ==
Tournament	2007	2008	2009	2010	2011	2012	2013	2014	2015	2016	2017	2018
Masters Tournament	CUT											
U.S. Open	CUT										CUT	CUT
The Open Championship	CUT		CUT			CUT	T58		T68	CUT	T22	
PGA Championship							CUT		CUT			

Tournament	2019	2020	2021	2022	2023
Masters Tournament					
PGA Championship					
U.S. Open					
The Open Championship		NT			T64

Did not play

CUT = missed the half-way cut
"T" indicates a tie for a place
NT = No tournament due to COVID-19 pandemic

=== Summary ===
Tournament	Wins	2nd	3rd	Top-5	Top-10	Top-25	Events	Cuts made
Masters Tournament	0	0	0	0	0	0	1	0
U.S. Open	0	0	0	0	0	0	3	0
The Open Championship	0	0	0	0	0	1	8	4
PGA Championship	0	0	0	0	0	0	2	0
Totals	0	0	0	0	0	1	14	4

- Most consecutive cuts made – 1 (four times, current)
- Longest streak of top-10s – 0

== Results in World Golf Championships ==
Results not in chronological order before 2015.

Tournament	2010	2011	2012	2013	2014	2015	2016	2017
Championship								
Match Play				R64				
Invitational				T48				
Champions	T3		T65					T44

Top 10
Did not play

QF, R16, R32, R64 = Round in which player lost in match play
"T" = Tied

== Team appearances ==
Amateur

- European Boys' Team Championship (representing Scotland): 2001
- European Youths' Team Championship (representing Scotland): 2004 (winners)
- European Amateur Team Championship (representing Scotland): 2005, 2007
- Walker Cup (representing Great Britain & Ireland): 2005
- Eisenhower Trophy (representing Scotland): 2006
- St Andrews Trophy (representing Great Britain & Ireland): 2006 (winners)
- Bonallack Trophy (representing Europe): 2006 (winners)
- Palmer Cup (representing Europe): 2006 (winners)

== See also ==
- 2008 Challenge Tour graduates
