= 2015 WGC-Cadillac Match Play =

Golf tournament

Coordinates: 37.724°N 122.493°W

Tournament information
- Dates: April 29 – May 3, 2015
- Location: San Francisco, California, U.S.
- Course: TPC Harding Park
- Tours: PGA Tour; European Tour
- Format: Match play – 18 holes

Statistics
- Par: 71
- Length: 7,127 yards (6,517 m)
- Field: 64 players
- Prize fund: $9,250,000 €8,487,016
- Winner's share: $1,570,000 €1,440,499

Champion
- (Northern Ireland) Rory McIlroy
- def. Gary Woodland, 4 & 2

Location in the United States
Location in California

The 2015 WGC-Cadillac Match Play was the 17th WGC-Cadillac Match Play Championship, played April 29 – May 3 at TPC Harding Park in San Francisco, California. It was the second of four World Golf Championships in 2015. Top-ranked Rory McIlroy defeated Gary Woodland 4 & 2 in the final, for his second win in a WGC event, after his win in the 2014 WGC-Bridgestone Invitational.

On September 30, 2014, Cadillac was announced as the new title sponsor.

== Field ==
The field consisted of the top 64 players available from the Official World Golf Ranking on April 19. However, the seedings were based on the World Rankings on April 26.

Luke Donald (ranked 50 on April 19, personal reasons), Tim Clark (ranked 57, injury), and Phil Mickelson (ranked 18, personal reasons) did not compete, allowing entry for Miguel Ángel Jiménez (ranked 65), Francesco Molinari (ranked 66), and Mikko Ilonen (ranked 67).

Two players made their WGC debut: Andy Sullivan and Ben Martin.

== Format ==
A new format was introduced in 2015. Previously, the Championship was a single elimination match play event. Beginning in 2015, the championship started with pool play, with 16 groups of four players playing round-robin matches, on Wednesday through Friday. There are no halved matches in pool play with extra holes played to determine the winner. The top 16 seeded players were allocated to the 16 groups, one in each group. The remaining 48 players were placed into three pools (seeds 17–32, seeds 33–48, seeds 49–64). Each group had one player randomly selected from each pool to complete the group.

The winners of each group advanced to a single-elimination bracket on the weekend, with the round of 16 and quarterfinals on Saturday, and the semi-finals, finals, and consolation match on Sunday. If two players are tied at the top of the group, the result of their head-to-head match determines the group winner. If three players are tied, the winner is determined by a sudden-death playoff.

Top 16 seeds
Seed and Rank	Player
1	(Northern Ireland) Rory McIlroy
2	(United States) Jordan Spieth
3	(Sweden) Henrik Stenson
4	(United States) Bubba Watson
5	(United States) Jim Furyk
6	(England) Justin Rose
7	(Australia) Jason Day
8	(United States) Dustin Johnson
9	(Australia) Adam Scott
10	(Spain) Sergio García
11	(United States) Jimmy Walker
12	(United States) J. B. Holmes
13	(United States) Rickie Fowler
14	(United States) Matt Kuchar
15	(United States) Patrick Reed
16	(Japan) Hideki Matsuyama

Pool 1
Seed	Rank	Player
17	17	(Germany) Martin Kaymer
18	19	(United States) Billy Horschel
19	20	(United States) Brooks Koepka
20	21	(United States) Kevin Na
21	22	(France) Victor Dubuisson
22	23	(United States) Ryan Palmer
23	24	(United States) Bill Haas
24	25	(United States) Zach Johnson
25	26	(United States) Chris Kirk
26	27	(England) Lee Westwood
27	28	(England) Ian Poulter
28	29	(United States) Ryan Moore
29	30	(South Africa) Louis Oosthuizen
30	31	(Wales) Jamie Donaldson
31	32	(United States) Hunter Mahan
32	33	(Northern Ireland) Graeme McDowell

Pool 2
Seed	Rank	Player
33	34	(United States) Keegan Bradley
34	35	(India) Anirban Lahiri
35	36	(United States) Brandt Snedeker
36	37	(England) Paul Casey
37	38	(South Africa) Charl Schwartzel
38	39	(South Africa) Branden Grace
39	40	(Austria) Bernd Wiesberger
40	41	(United States) Matt Every
41	42	(Scotland) Stephen Gallacher
42	43	(United States) Brendon Todd
43	44	(Netherlands) Joost Luiten
44	45	(Thailand) Thongchai Jaidee
45	46	(United States) Russell Henley
46	47	(United States) Webb Simpson
47	48	(Republic of Ireland) Shane Lowry
48	49	(England) Danny Willett

Pool 3
Seed	Rank	Player
49	50	(United States) Charley Hoffman
50	52	(United States) Gary Woodland
51	53	(Scotland) Marc Warren
52	54	(France) Alexander Lévy
53	56	(United States) Jason Dufner
54	57	(England) Tommy Fleetwood
55	58	(United States) Harris English
56	60	(Australia) Marc Leishman
57	61	(England) Andy Sullivan
58	63	(Australia) Matt Jones
59	64	(South Africa) George Coetzee
60	65	(Australia) John Senden
61	67	(United States) Ben Martin
62	68	(Finland) Mikko Ilonen
63	69	(Spain) Miguel Ángel Jiménez
64	70	(Italy) Francesco Molinari

Rank – Official World Golf Ranking on April 26, 2015.

== Results ==
=== Pool play ===
Players were divided into 16 groups of four players and played round-robin matches on Wednesday to Friday.

- Round 1 – April 29
- Round 2 – April 30
- Round 3 – May 1

Notes: Round 1

Of the 32 matches played, 14 were "upsets" with the lower seeded player beating the higher seeded player. These included #3 Henrik Stenson (lost to #60 John Senden), #6 Justin Rose (lost to #56 Marc Leishman), #7 Jason Day (lost to #49 Charley Hoffman), and #9 Adam Scott (lost to #64 Francesco Molinari).

Notes: Round 2

Of the 32 matches played, 16 were upsets. These included #5 Jim Furyk (lost to #44 Thongchai Jaidee), #7 Day (lost to #38 Branden Grace), #8 Dustin Johnson (lost to #37 Charl Schwartzel), #9 Scott (lost to #36 Paul Casey), and #10 Sergio García (lost to #39 Bernd Wiesberger). Two players, #13 Rickie Fowler and #60 John Senden, were guaranteed to advance.

Notes: Round 3

Of the 32 matches played, 18 were upsets. These included #2 Jordan Spieth (lost to #26 Lee Westwood), #3 Stenson (lost to #23 Bill Haas), #4 Bubba Watson (lost to #29 Louis Oosthuizen), #7 Day (lost to #24 Zach Johnson), #9 Scott (lost to #25 Chris Kirk), and #10 García (lost to #30 Jamie Donaldson). Day, Scott and Jimmy Walker were the only top seeds to lose all three matches. Only five of the top seeds advanced: #1 Rory McIlroy, #5 Furyk, #12 J. B. Holmes, #13 Fowler, and #16 Hideki Matsuyama. 12 of the 16 group winners advanced with perfect 3–0 records. Three groups winners advanced based on head-to-head tie-breaker and one group went to a three-way sudden-death playoff. Branden Grace defeated Zach Johnson and Charley Hoffman on the third extra hole in group 7. In Group 11, all six matches of the three rounds were upsets. A total of 18 of the 96 matches went extra holes, causing some to suggest altering the format next year to include halved matches.

Group 1
Round	Winner	Score	Loser
1	McIlroy	5 & 4	Dufner
1	Horschel	5 & 4	Snedeker
2	McIlroy	2 up	Snedeker
2	Horschel	3 & 2	Dufner
3	McIlroy	20 h	Horschel
3	Dufner	1 up	Snedeker

Seed	Player	W	L	Finish
1	(Northern Ireland) Rory McIlroy	3	0	1
18	(United States) Billy Horschel	2	1	2
53	(United States) Jason Dufner	1	2	3
35	(United States) Brandt Snedeker	0	3	4

Group 2
Round	Winner	Score	Loser
1	Spieth	4 & 2	Ilonen
1	Westwood	1 up	Every
2	Spieth	4 & 3	Every
2	Westwood	1 up	Ilonen
3	Westwood	1 up	Spieth
3	Ilonen	8 & 6	Every

Seed	Player	W	L	Finish
26	(England) Lee Westwood	3	0	1
2	(United States) Jordan Spieth	2	1	2
62	(Finland) Mikko Ilonen	1	2	3
40	(United States) Matt Every	0	3	4

Group 3
Round	Winner	Score	Loser
1	Senden	19 h	Stenson
1	Haas	3 & 2	Todd
2	Stenson	3 & 2	Todd
2	Senden	4 & 3	Haas
3	Haas	3 & 1	Stenson
3	Senden	1 up	Todd

Seed	Player	W	L	Finish
60	(Australia) John Senden	3	0	1
23	(United States) Bill Haas	2	1	2
3	(Sweden) Henrik Stenson	1	2	3
42	(United States) Brendon Todd	0	3	4

Group 4
Round	Winner	Score	Loser
1	Watson	5 & 4	Jiménez
1	Oosthuizen	6 & 5	Bradley
2	Watson	4 & 2	Bradley
2	Oosthuizen	2 up	Jiménez
3	Oosthuizen	19 h	Watson
3	Jiménez	2 up	Bradley

Seed	Player	W	L	Finish
29	(South Africa) Louis Oosthuizen	3	0	1
4	(United States) Bubba Watson	2	1	2
63	(Spain) Miguel Ángel Jiménez	1	2	3
33	(United States) Keegan Bradley	0	3	4

Group 5
Round	Winner	Score	Loser
1	Furyk	3 & 2	Coetzee
1	Kaymer	3 & 1	Jaidee
2	Jaidee	3 & 1	Furyk
2	Coetzee	19 h	Kaymer
3	Furyk	20 h	Kaymer
3	Coetzee	21 h	Jaidee

Seed	Player	W	L	Finish
5	(United States) Jim Furyk	2	1	1
59	(South Africa) George Coetzee	2	1	2
17	(Germany) Martin Kaymer	1	2	T3
44	(Thailand) Thongchai Jaidee	1	2	T3

Group 6
Round	Winner	Score	Loser
1	Leishman	3 & 2	Rose
1	Lahiri	4 & 2	Palmer
2	Rose	19 h	Lahiri
2	Leishman	4 & 3	Palmer
3	Rose	2 & 1	Palmer
3	Leishman	1 up	Lahiri

Seed	Player	W	L	Finish
56	(Australia) Marc Leishman	3	0	1
6	(England) Justin Rose	2	1	2
34	(India) Anirban Lahiri	1	2	3
22	(United States) Ryan Palmer	0	3	4

Group 7
Round	Winner	Score	Loser
1	Hoffman	4 & 3	Day
1	Z. Johnson	2 up	Grace
2	Grace	4 & 3	Day
2	Hoffman	2 & 1	Z. Johnson
3	Z. Johnson	3 & 2	Day
3	Grace	2 & 1	Hoffman

Seed	Player	W	L	Finish
38	(South Africa) Branden Grace	2	1	1
24	(United States) Zach Johnson	2	1	T2
49	(United States) Charley Hoffman	2	1	T2
7	(Australia) Jason Day	0	3	4

Grace won sudden-death playoff with a birdie on the third hole.

Group 8
Round	Winner	Score	Loser
1	D. Johnson	3 & 1	Jones
1	Schwartzel	5 & 4	Dubuisson
2	Schwartzel	20 h	D. Johnson
2	Jones	2 up	Dubuisson
3	D. Johnson	2 & 1	Dubuisson
3	Schwartzel	20 h	Jones

Seed	Player	W	L	Finish
37	(South Africa) Charl Schwartzel	3	0	1
8	(United States) Dustin Johnson	2	1	2
58	(Australia) Matt Jones	1	2	3
21	(France) Victor Dubuisson	0	3	4

Group 9
Round	Winner	Score	Loser
1	Molinari	5 & 4	Scott
1	Casey	22 h	Kirk
2	Casey	1 up	Scott
2	Kirk	2 & 1	Molinari
3	Kirk	1 up	Scott
3	Casey	1 up	Molinari

Seed	Player	W	L	Finish
36	(England) Paul Casey	3	0	1
25	(United States) Chris Kirk	2	1	2
64	(Italy) Francesco Molinari	1	2	3
9	(Australia) Adam Scott	0	3	4

Group 10
Round	Winner	Score	Loser
1	García	2 up	Fleetwood
1	Donaldson	1 up	Wiesberger
2	Wiesberger	2 & 1	García
2	Fleetwood	21 h	Donaldson
3	Donaldson	2 & 1	García
3	Fleetwood	19 h	Wiesberger

Seed	Player	W	L	Finish
54	(England) Tommy Fleetwood	2	1	1
30	(Wales) Jamie Donaldson	2	1	2
39	(Austria) Bernd Wiesberger	1	2	T3
10	(Spain) Sergio García	1	2	T3

Group 11
Round	Winner	Score	Loser
1	Woodland	19 h	Walker
1	Simpson	3 & 2	Poulter
2	Simpson	19 h	Walker
2	Woodland	3 & 2	Poulter
3	Poulter	4 & 2	Walker
3	Woodland	1 up	Simpson

Seed	Player	W	L	Finish
50	(United States) Gary Woodland	3	0	1
46	(United States) Webb Simpson	2	1	2
27	(England) Ian Poulter	1	2	3
11	(United States) Jimmy Walker	0	3	4

Group 12
Round	Winner	Score	Loser
1	Warren	2 & 1	Holmes
1	Koepka	1 up	Henley
2	Holmes	19 h	Henley
2	Koepka	20 h	Warren
3	Holmes	2 & 1	Koepka
3	Henley	1 up	Warren

Seed	Player	W	L	Finish
12	(United States) J. B. Holmes	2	1	1
19	(United States) Brooks Koepka	2	1	2
45	(United States) Russell Henley	1	2	T3
51	(Scotland) Marc Warren	1	2	T3

Group 13
Round	Winner	Score	Loser
1	Fowler	1 up	English
1	Lowry	1 up	McDowell
2	Fowler	1 up	Lowry
2	English	2 & 1	McDowell
3	Fowler	5 & 4	McDowell
3	English	1 up	Lowry

Seed	Player	W	L	Finish
13	(United States) Rickie Fowler	3	0	1
55	(United States) Harris English	2	1	2
47	(Republic of Ireland) Shane Lowry	1	2	3
32	(Northern Ireland) Graeme McDowell	0	3	4

Group 14
Round	Winner	Score	Loser
1	Martin	1 up	Kuchar
1	Mahan	7 & 6	Gallacher
2	Kuchar	3 & 2	Gallacher
2	Mahan	5 & 3	Martin
3	Mahan	5 & 4	Kuchar
3	Martin	20 h	Gallacher

Seed	Player	W	L	Finish
31	(United States) Hunter Mahan	3	0	1
61	(United States) Ben Martin	2	1	2
14	(United States) Matt Kuchar	1	2	3
41	(Scotland) Stephen Gallacher	0	3	4

Group 15
Round	Winner	Score	Loser
1	Reed	2 & 1	Sullivan
1	Willett	3 & 2	Moore
2	Willett	2 & 1	Reed
2	Sullivan	3 & 2	Moore
3	Reed	1 up	Moore
3	Willett	1 up	Sullivan

Seed	Player	W	L	Finish
48	(England) Danny Willett	3	0	1
15	(United States) Patrick Reed	2	1	2
57	(England) Andy Sullivan	1	2	3
28	(United States) Ryan Moore	0	3	4

Group 16
Round	Winner	Score	Loser
1	Matsuyama	5 & 4	Lévy
1	Luiten	19 h	Na
2	Matsuyama	2 up	Luiten
2	Na	3 & 1	Lévy
3	Matsuyama	5 & 4	Na
3	Luiten	1 up	Lévy

Seed	Player	W	L	Finish
16	(Japan) Hideki Matsuyama	3	0	1
43	(Netherlands) Joost Luiten	2	1	2
20	(United States) Kevin Na	1	2	3
52	(France) Alexander Lévy	0	3	4

=== Final 16 bracket ===
First round May 2 – morning
1	(Northern Ireland) Rory McIlroy	6&5
16	(Japan) Hideki Matsuyama
37	(South Africa) Charl Schwartzel
36	(England) Paul Casey	3&1
5	(United States) Jim Furyk	5&3
12	(United States) J. B. Holmes
29	(South Africa) Louis Oosthuizen	1 up
13	(United States) Rickie Fowler
56	(Australia) Marc Leishman
50	(United States) Gary Woodland	2&1
60	(Australia) John Senden	2&1
31	(United States) Hunter Mahan
38	(South Africa) Branden Grace
54	(England) Tommy Fleetwood	2&1
26	(England) Lee Westwood
48	(England) Danny Willett	3&2

Quarter-finals; May 2 – afternoon
1	(Northern Ireland) Rory McIlroy	22h
36	(England) Paul Casey
5	(United States) Jim Furyk	4&2
29	(South Africa) Louis Oosthuizen
50	(United States) Gary Woodland	5&3
60	(Australia) John Senden
54	(England) Tommy Fleetwood
48	(England) Danny Willett	4&3

Semi-finals; May 3 – morning
1	(Northern Ireland) Rory McIlroy	1up
5	(United States) Jim Furyk
50	(United States) Gary Woodland	3&2
48	(England) Danny Willett

Final; May 3 – afternoon
1	(Northern Ireland) Rory McIlroy	4&2
50	(United States) Gary Woodland
Third place
5	(United States) Jim Furyk
48	(England) Danny Willett	3&2

The match between Rory McIlroy and Paul Casey was completed on May 3 having been all square after 21 holes when it became too dark to continue.

== Prize money breakdown ==
Place	Description	US ($)
1	Champion	1,570,000
2	Runner-up	930,000
3	Third place	646,000
4	Fourth place	520,000
T5	Losing quarter-finalists x 4	285,000
T9	Losing round of 16 x 8	150,000
T17	Those with 2–1 record in pool play x 17	85,824
T34	Those with 1–2 record in pool play x 18	63,500
T52	Those with 0–3 record in pool play x 13	49,385
	Total	9,250,000
