= Lough Erne Challenge =

Tournament information
- Location: Enniskillen, County Fermanagh, Northern Ireland
- Established: 2009
- Course: Lough Erne Resort
- Par: 72
- Length: 7,071 yards (6,466 m)
- Format: Stroke play
- Month played: July
- Final year: 2010

Tournament record score
- Aggregate: 66 Darren Clarke and Rory McIlroy (2010)
- To par: −6 as above

Final champion
- (Northern Ireland) Darren Clarke and (Northern Ireland) Rory McIlroy
- Location in Northern Ireland

The Lough Erne Challenge was a golf event that was played twice on The Faldo Course at the Lough Erne Resort, County Fermanagh, Northern Ireland. The inaugural Lough Erne Challenge, played in July 2009, was between Rory McIlroy - touring professional at Lough Erne Resort - and Pádraig Harrington. McIlroy won the 18 hole strokeplay match with a four under par round of 68 to Harrington's two under par 70. In July 2010 McIlroy teamed up with Darren Clarke to form a Northern Ireland team that took on Harrington and Shane Lowry, representing the Republic of Ireland. The Northern Ireland team won the 18 hole combined strokeplay event with a score of six under par with the Republic of Ireland one shot back on five under par.

== Winners ==
| Year | Winner(s) | Score | To par | Margin of victory | Runner(s)-up |
|---|---|---|---|---|---|
| 2010 | (Northern Ireland) Darren Clarke and (Northern Ireland) Rory McIlroy (2) | 66 | −6 | 1 stroke | (Republic of Ireland) Pádraig Harrington and (Republic of Ireland) Shane Lowry |
| 2009 | (Northern Ireland) Rory McIlroy | 68 | −4 | 2 strokes | (Republic of Ireland) Pádraig Harrington |
