= Rory McIlroy =

Northern Irish golfer (born 1989)

Rory McIlroy MBE
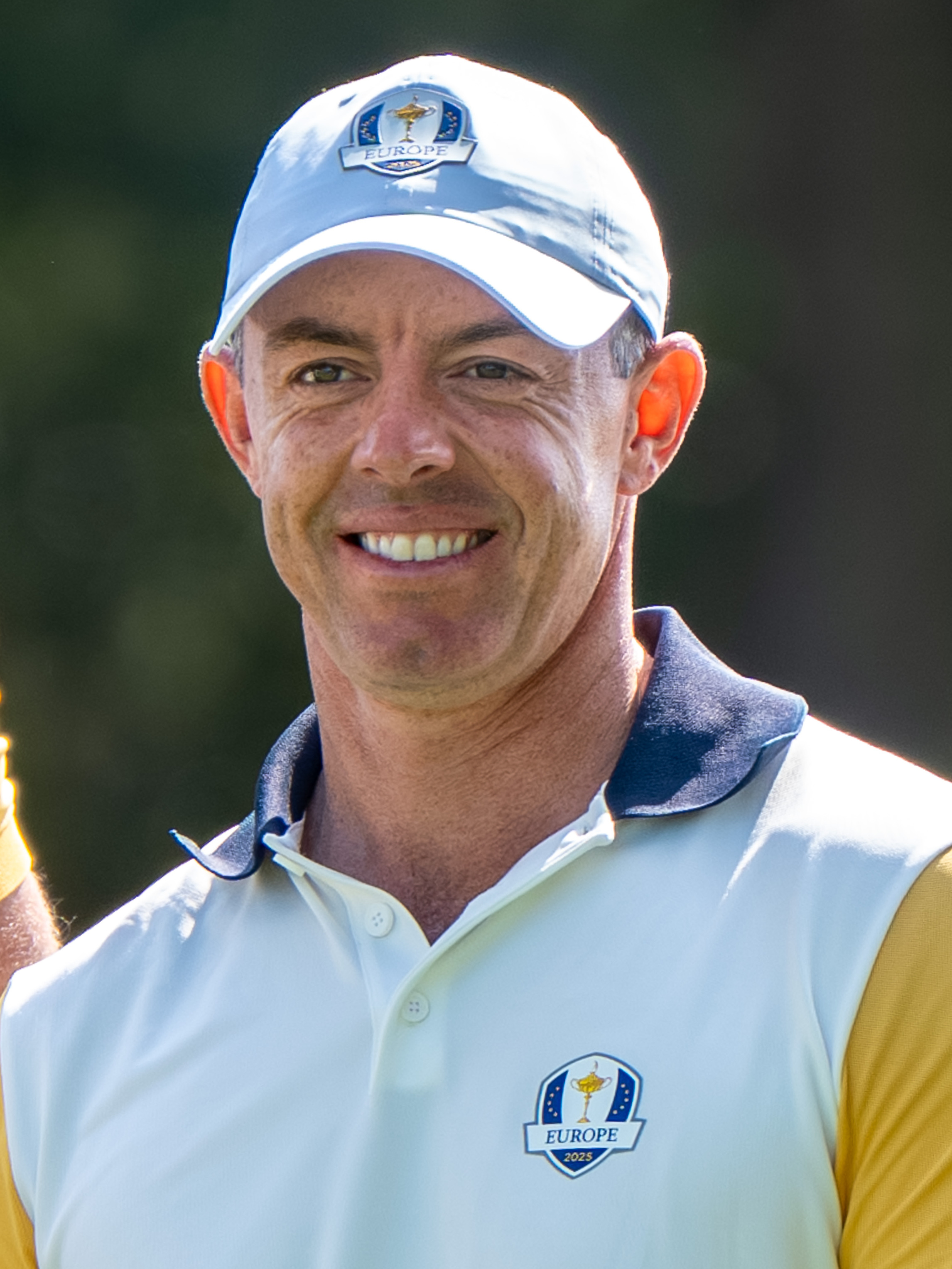
- McIlroy at the 2025 Ryder Cup

Personal information
- Full name: Rory Daniel McIlroy
- Nicknames: Rors, Wee-Mac
- Born: 4 May 1989 (age 37) Holywood, County Down, Northern Ireland
- Height: 5 ft 9 in (1.75 m)
- Weight: 11 1/2 st (161 lb; 73 kg)
- Spouse: Erica Stoll (m. 2017)
- Children: 1

Career
- Sport: Golf
- Turned professional: 2007
- Current tours: European Tour; PGA Tour
- Professional wins: 45
- Highest ranking: 1 (4 March 2012) (122 weeks)

Number of wins by tour
- PGA Tour: 30
- European Tour: 21 (tied-10th all-time)
- Asian Tour: 1
- PGA Tour of Australasia: 1
- Other: 3

Best results in major championships (wins: 6)
- Masters Tournament: Won: 2025, 2026
- PGA Championship: Won: 2012, 2014
- U.S. Open: Won: 2011
- The Open Championship: Won: 2014

Achievements and awards
- PGA Tour money list winner: 2012, 2013–14
- PGA Tour Player of the Year: 2012, 2013–14, 2018–19
- PGA Player of the Year: 2012, 2014
- Byron Nelson Award: 2012, 2013–14, 2018–19, 2021–22
- Vardon Trophy: 2012, 2014, 2019, 2022
- European Tour Race to Dubai winner/ DP World Tour Rankings winner: 2012, 2014, 2015, 2022, 2023, 2024, 2025, 2026
- European Tour Golfer of the Year: 2012, 2014, 2015
- European Tour Player of the Year: 2012, 2014, 2015, 2024
- Mark H. McCormack Award: 2012, 2014, 2015
- PGA Tour FedEx Cup winner: 2016, 2019, 2022

Rory Daniel McIlroy (born 4 May 1989) is a Northern Irish professional golfer who plays on the PGA Tour and the European Tour. He is a former world number one in the Official World Golf Ranking and has spent over 100 weeks in that position during his career. A six-time major champion, he is the sixth man to complete the modern career grand slam—after Gene Sarazen, Ben Hogan, Gary Player, Jack Nicklaus, and Tiger Woods—and the first European to do so.

McIlroy reached number one in the World Amateur Golf Ranking in 2007 and turned professional later that year. He won his first major championship at the 2011 U.S. Open and rose to number one in the Official World Golf Ranking in 2012. By age 25, McIlroy had won three more majors: the 2012 and 2014 PGA Championship and the 2014 Open Championship. In 2022, he became the first person to win the FedEx Cup three times. McIlroy won The Players Championship in 2019 and 2025. After a ten-year drought in the majors, he won his fifth at the 2025 Masters Tournament to complete the career grand slam; he added a second consecutive Masters in 2026.

McIlroy has represented Europe, Ireland and Great Britain & Ireland at amateur and professional level. He has played for Europe at the Ryder Cup in every edition from 2010 to 2025, with Europe winning in 2010, 2012, 2014, 2018, 2023 and 2025. McIlroy has been named PGA Tour Player of the Year three times and has won the European Tour's Harry Vardon Trophy seven times.

== Early life ==
Rory Daniel McIlroy was born on 4 May 1989 in Holywood, County Down, Northern Ireland. His mother, Rosaleen "Rosie" McDonald, was originally from Lurgan, County Armagh, while his father, Gerry McIlroy, was from Holywood. His parents met while Rosie worked as a waitress at a bar Gerry managed in Belfast and they married at St Colmcille's Church in Holywood in January 1988, both aged 27. McIlroy was an only child and the family lived in a modest, semi-detached house in Holywood. He attended St Patrick's, a Catholic primary school, until he passed his eleven-plus and gained entry to Sullivan Upper School, a mixed grammar school.

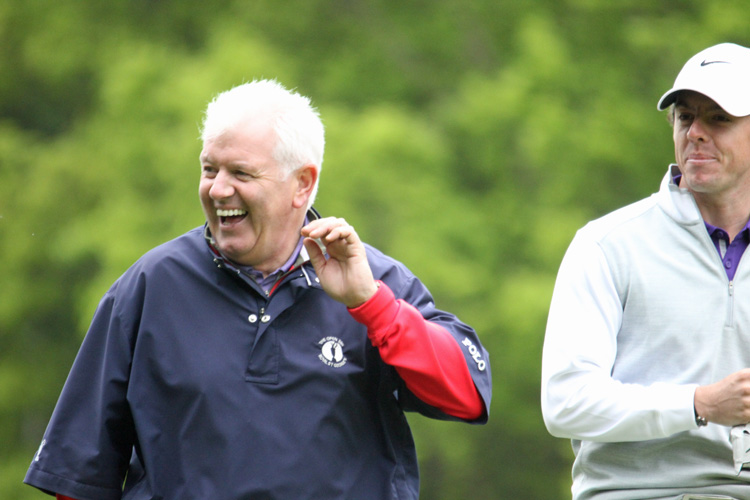
Rory and father Gerry McIlroy in May 2013

McIlroy was introduced to golf at a young age by his father and received a set of plastic clubs when he was two years old. His father was a golfer himself, who once played at a scratch handicap level. On his mother's side, McIlroy's uncle Mickey McDonald was a talented athlete: he played Gaelic football for Armagh GAA, winning the Ulster Senior Football Championship in 1982, and association football for Glenavon F.C. and Cliftonville F.C..

McIlroy regularly asked his father to take him to the nearby Holywood Golf Club, where he gained attention by hitting 40-yard (37 m) drives at age three. He practiced chipping at home by hitting balls into the family's washing machine, studied a golf technique video by Nick Faldo and often went to sleep holding a golf club to develop muscle memory of the interlocking grip. At age seven, McIlroy became Holywood Golf Club's youngest-ever member and dreamed of becoming a professional golfer. He was a self-described "anorak" of Tiger Woods as a child, stating "I was only eight but I watched every hole" of Woods's victory at the 1997 Masters Tournament. McIlroy received early tutelage from coach Michael Bannon at Holywood Golf Club.

To fund his golfing ambitions, McIlroy's parents took on extra jobs. Gerry worked 100 hours a week; he cleaned toilets and showers at a local sports club in the mornings, served as a bartender at Holywood Golf Club from 12 to 6 pm, then returned to the sports club to work behind the bar in the evenings. Rosie looked after Rory during the day and worked night shifts packaging rolls of tape at a 3M factory in Bangor, County Down. Due to their conflicting schedules, McIlroy's parents rarely saw each other during this period. Gerry later said: "I had no idea what else to do. I'm a working-class man. We wanted to give our only child a chance." After finding success as a professional golfer, McIlroy bought his parents a house in 2009, stating: "I'll never be able to repay Mum and Dad for what they did, but at least they know they'll never have to work another day. I'll do whatever it takes to look after them."

Aged nine, McIlroy had his first significant international amateur tournament victory, at the U10 World Championship held at Doral Golf Resort & Spa in Miami, Florida. After this win, he was invited by broadcaster Gerry Kelly to appear on the television show Kelly, where he demonstrated his technique of chipping a golf ball into a washing machine for the audience. In a 1998 interview with BBC Sport, McIlroy said his ambition was to win all four major championship titles. He became a scratch handicap at age 12, and began to receive mentorship from professional golfer Darren Clarke. McIlroy decided to leave school in 2005 in order to concentrate on golf.

== Amateur career ==
McIlroy won the Ulster Boys' U15 Championship in 2002 and the Ulster Boys' U18 Championship in 2003. At the age of 15, he was a member of the Irish team at the 2004 European Boys' Team Championship in Finland and the European team which won the 2004 Junior Ryder Cup against the United States on foreign soil in Ohio. In 2005, McIlroy became the youngest-ever winner of both the West of Ireland Championship and the Irish Close Championship. He had signed a letter of intent in late 2004 to play collegiate golf at East Tennessee State University, but after his wins in 2005, he decided to forgo the golf scholarship and continue to play amateur golf in Europe.

At age 16, McIlroy made his European Tour debut in May 2005 at the Daily Telegraph Dunlop Masters. Two months later, he shot a 61 at the Dunluce Links of Royal Portrush Golf Club during stroke-play qualifying at the North of Ireland Amateur Open, breaking the competitive course record. McIlroy made his first cut in a professional tournament at the Morson International Pro-Am Challenge on the Challenge Tour in August 2005. He shot a final-round 67 to finish at 278, seven strokes behind the winner Andrés Romero.

McIlroy represented Ireland at the 2005 European Amateur Team Championship. However, Ireland did not advance to the match-play portion. Two years later, he competed for Ireland again at the 2007 European Amateur Team Championship, this time with future Open champion Shane Lowry as one of his teammates. McIlroy was the individual leader in the stroke-play portion and Ireland ultimately defeated France in the final to claim victory. This was Ireland's first title in the championship since 1987.

In August 2006, McIlroy won the European Amateur at Biella Golf Club, near Milan, Italy, which earned him an exemption to The Open Championship the following year. Also in 2006, he represented Europe against the Asia/Pacific team at the Bonallack Trophy in New Zealand, represented Ireland in the Eisenhower Trophy, and retained both his West of Ireland and Irish Close titles. McIlroy made his first cut on the European Tour in February 2007, as a 17-year-old at the Dubai Desert Classic. He had to forego prize money of over €7,000 due to his amateur status. Following his performance in Dubai, McIlroy rose to number one in the World Amateur Golf Ranking. In March, he won the Grey Goose Cup in Sotogrande, Spain, defeating Marius Thorp in a playoff.

In his major championship debut, at the 2007 Open Championship held at Carnoustie Golf Links in July, McIlroy shot a bogey-free opening round of 3-under-par 68. He ended the tournament in tied-42nd place, ranking as the low amateur and winning the silver medal. McIlroy chose to end his amateur career at the 2007 Walker Cup in September, where he represented the Great Britain & Ireland team at the Royal County Down Golf Club. McIlroy's overall record was 1–2–1, including a win in his Sunday singles match against Billy Horschel, as the United States emerged victorious over Great Britain & Ireland by a score of 12.5–11.5.

== Professional career ==
=== 2007–2009: Early years, first European Tour win ===
McIlroy turned professional on 18 September 2007 and signed with International Sports Management. He made his first professional start the following day at the Quinn Direct British Masters, where he finished in a tie for 42nd place. In his next start, he finished third at the Alfred Dunhill Links Championship. He secured his European Tour card for 2008 the following week by finishing in a tie for 4th place at the Open de Madrid Valle Romano. Aged 18, he became the youngest affiliate member in the history of the European Tour to earn a tour card. On the 2007 European Tour season, he earned €277,255 and finished in 95th place on the Order of Merit list.

McIlroy entered the top 200 of the Official World Golf Ranking (OWGR) for the first time on 27 January 2008. On 7 September 2008, McIlroy took a four-stroke lead into the final round of the Omega European Masters in Crans-sur-Sierre, Switzerland, but finished in a tie for first place with Frenchman Jean-François Lucquin and lost in a play-off. McIlroy finished the 2008 European Tour season with six top-10 placements and ranked 79th in the OWGR. After finishing second in the UBS Hong Kong Open in November 2008, McIlroy moved into the top 50 of the OWGR. He ended the calendar year at 39th; this earned him an invitation to the 2009 Masters Tournament.

McIlroy's first professional win came at age 19 when he won the Dubai Desert Classic on 1 February 2009, which took him to 16th in the OWGR. At the 2009 WGC-Accenture Match Play Championship in March, McIlroy reached the quarterfinals, where he lost to eventual champion Geoff Ogilvy. In April, McIlroy made his Masters debut, which was his first major championship as a professional. He finished the tournament tied for 20th place. Of the players to make the cut, he ranked third in average driving distance, beaten only by Dustin Johnson and Andrés Romero.

McIlroy then returned to Europe, finishing fifth at the BMW PGA Championship and 12th at the European Open in May. He played in his second major as a professional at the 2009 U.S. Open, where he shot a final-round 68 to finish in a tie for 10th. In July, McIlroy played in the 2009 Open Championship, his first Open as a professional, and finished T-47. The following month, he tied for 3rd on debut at the 2009 PGA Championship. McIlroy finished the 2009 season ranked second on the Race to Dubai, behind Lee Westwood, and in November he entered the top 10 of the world rankings for the first time. McIlroy subsequently announced that he would join the American-based PGA Tour for the 2010 season. He ended 2009 by representing Ireland at the 2009 World Cup, alongside Graeme McDowell. They opened with a 14-under 58 in the first-round fourballs, and held a three-shot lead after the third round, but a final-round 70 resulted in a tie for 2nd.

=== 2010: First PGA Tour victory, Ryder Cup debut ===
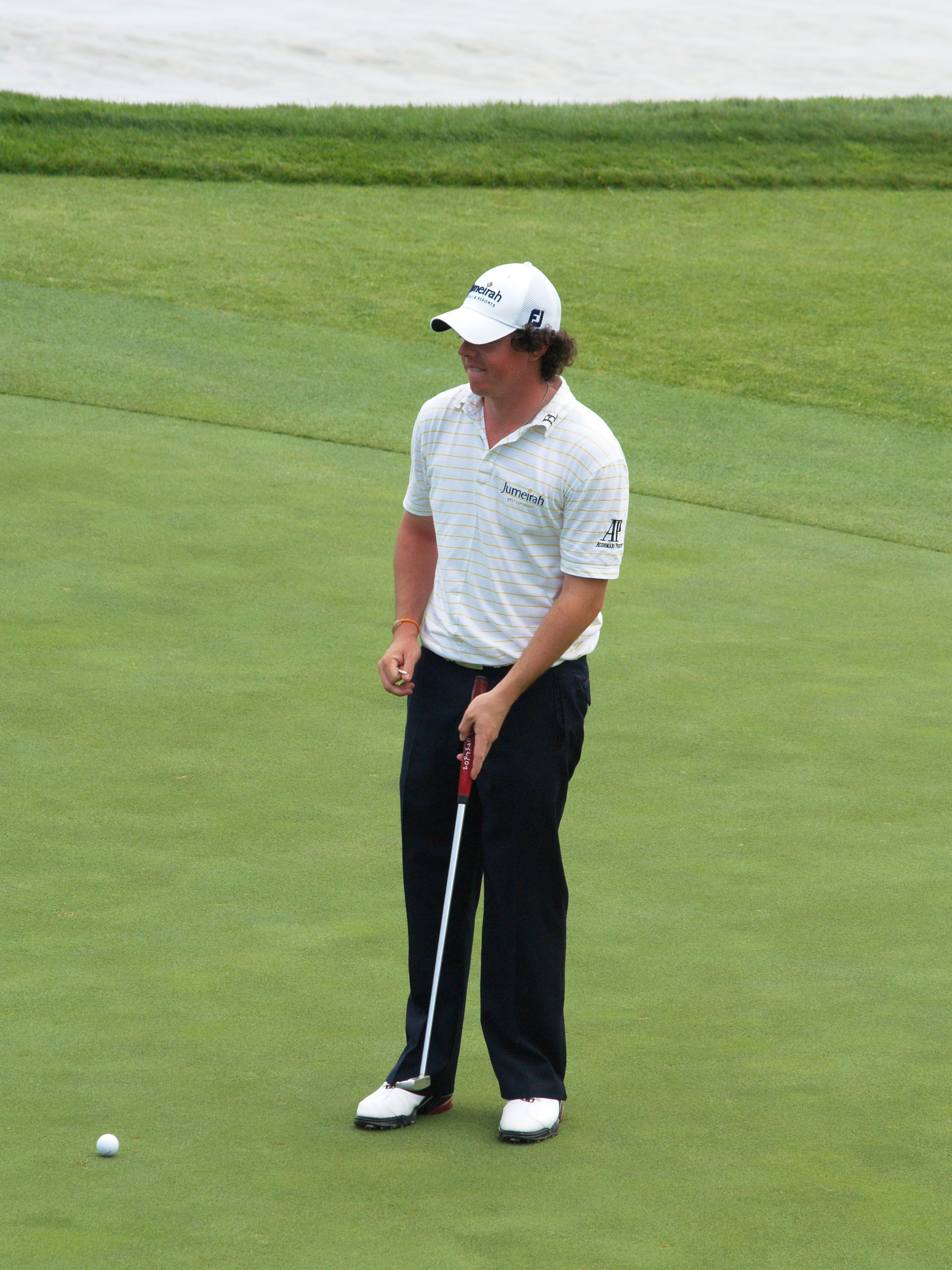
McIlroy during a practice round of the 2010 PGA Championship

McIlroy started the year by finishing third at the 2010 Abu Dhabi Golf Championship in January. As the defending champion at the Dubai Desert Classic, he shot a final-round 73 to tie for fifth place. On 2 May, McIlroy shot a course-record 62 in the final round of the Quail Hollow Championship to beat Phil Mickelson by four strokes and record his first PGA Tour win. The win came two days before McIlroy's 21st birthday, making him the first player since Tiger Woods to win a PGA Tour event prior to that age. The win earned him a two-year exemption on the PGA Tour.

At the 2010 Open Championship, held at the Old Course at St Andrews in July, McIlroy tied the course record with a 9-under-par 63 on the opening day. He ended the tournament tied for third. In August, McIlroy finished in third-place at the 2010 PGA Championship, one shot outside of a playoff between Bubba Watson and eventual winner Martin Kaymer.

As an automatic qualifier, McIlroy was selected to represented Europe at the 2010 Ryder Cup. He tied his Sunday singles match against Stewart Cink, helping Europe to regain the cup by a score of 14.5–13.5. Following the Ryder Cup, he announced in November that he would return to play full-time on the European Tour, although adding that he would continue to play a limited schedule on the PGA Tour. McIlroy stated in 2012 that he regretted this 2010 decision to give up his PGA Tour card and skip the 2011 Players Championship. McIlroy's manager Chubby Chandler's aversion to the PGA Tour was cited by McIlroy as one of the main reasons for their later professional split.

=== 2011: Masters collapse, U.S. Open breakthrough ===
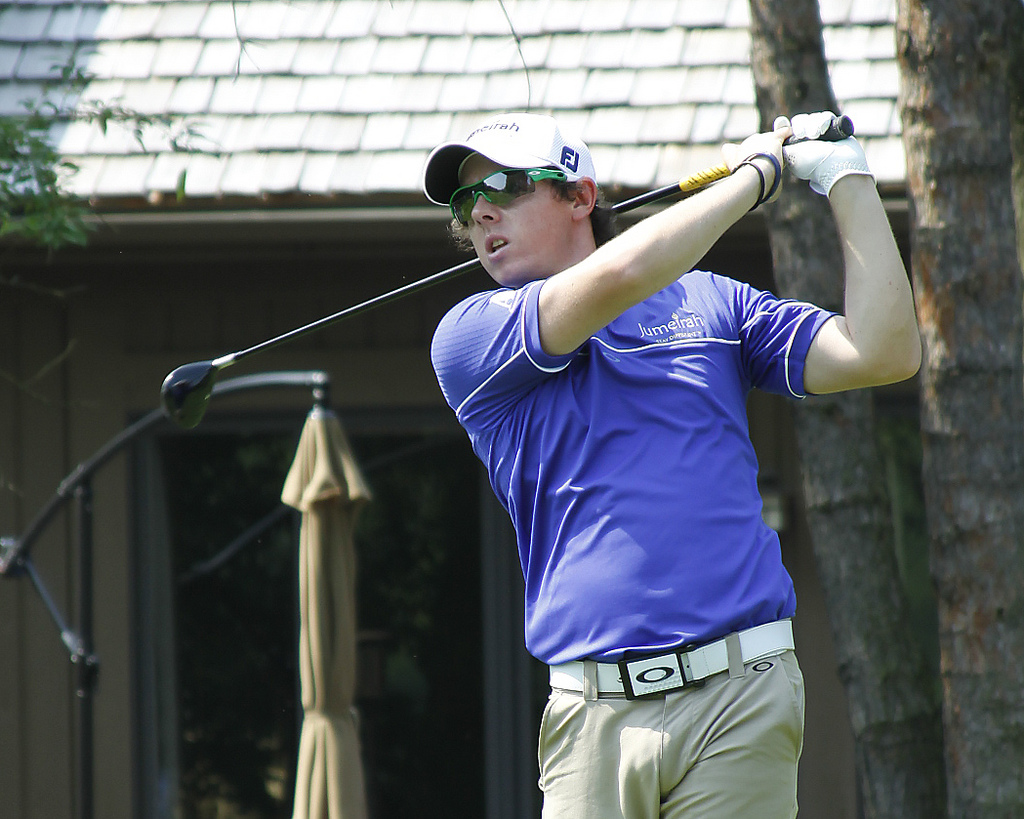
McIlroy in June 2011 at the Memorial Tournament

In his first start of the year, McIlroy finished runner-up at the Abu Dhabi HSBC Golf Championship in January, eight strokes behind Martin Kaymer. In April, McIlroy shot a bogey-free 65 in the first round of the 2011 Masters Tournament to lead the field. This made him the youngest player at the time ever to hold the first-round lead at the Masters. He then shot rounds of 69 and 70, giving him a four-stroke lead after 54 holes. In the final round, McIlroy shot an 8-over-par 80, including a triple bogey on the 10th and double bogey on the 12th hole. He ultimately finished in a tie for 15th, 10 strokes behind winner Charl Schwartzel.

In his next major start, at the 2011 U.S. Open held at Congressional Country Club in June, McIlroy again shot a bogey-free 65 to take the first-round lead. He shot 66 in the second round to set a record for the lowest 36-hole total in U.S. Open history (131, −11). He posted 68 in third round, to also set the 54-hole scoring record at 199 (−14). In doing so, he built an eight-stroke lead going into the final round. McIlroy shot a final round of 69 to earn his first major championship title, eight strokes ahead of runner-up Jason Day. McIlroy's 72-hole aggregate score of 268 (−16) was a new U.S. Open record, breaking the previous record of 272 jointly held by Jack Nicklaus (1980), Lee Janzen (1993), Tiger Woods (2000) and Jim Furyk (2003). The 16-under in relation to par beat Tiger Woods's 12-under at Pebble Beach Golf Links in 2000. At age 22, McIlroy also became the youngest winner since Bobby Jones in 1923 U.S. Open, and the victory lifted him to a new career-high fourth in the OWGR.

At the 2011 Open Championship in July, he struggled in the tough weather conditions and finished in tied-25th place. He was also a non-factor at the 2011 PGA Championship, where he injured his wrist in the first round after attempting to play a stroke from behind a tree root. In October, McIlroy won the Lake Malaren Shanghai Masters in a playoff against Anthony Kim, earning the $2 million first-place prize, the highest in golf at that time. In December, he won the UBS Hong Kong Open by two strokes.

=== 2012: World number one, five-win season, second major championship title ===
In January, McIlroy finished solo-second at the Abu Dhabi HSBC Golf Championship, one stroke behind winner Robert Rock. At the 2012 WGC-Accenture Match Play Championship in February, he recorded another runner-up finish, losing to Hunter Mahan, 2 and 1, in the final. The following week, McIlroy won the Honda Classic, where he shot a final round of 69 to finish two strokes ahead of Tiger Woods and Tom Gillis. With this victory, McIlroy reached the number one position in the Official World Golf Ranking for the first time in his career. Aged 22, he became the second-youngest man to reach number one, behind Woods who achieved the feat at 21.

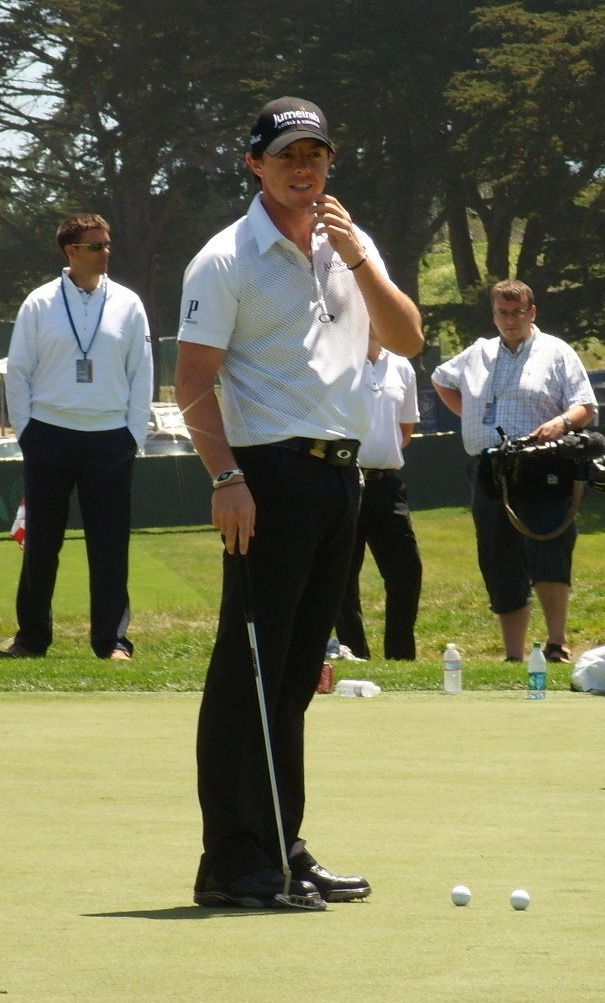
McIlroy warming up at the 2012 U.S. Open in San Francisco

At the 2012 Masters Tournament in April, McIlroy was in third place after two rounds, one stroke behind the leaders, but struggled on the weekend with rounds of 77 and 76 and finished in a tie for 40th. In May, he was in contention at the Wells Fargo Championship and went to a playoff with Rickie Fowler and D. A. Points. Fowler won the tournament on the first playoff hole with a birdie.

In August, McIlroy won the 2012 PGA Championship at the Kiawah Island Ocean Course. He birdied the final hole to shoot 66 and win by eight strokes, a new record for the largest margin-of-victory at the PGA Championship. The prior record had stood since Jack Nicklaus won the 1980 PGA Championship by seven strokes. At age 23, McIlroy became the youngest multiple major champion since Seve Ballesteros won the 1980 Masters Tournament.

At the Deutsche Bank Championship in September, McIlroy overcame a three-shot deficit headed into the final round to defeat Louis Oosthuizen by one stroke. The following week. McIlroy won the BMW Championship, two strokes ahead of Phil Mickelson and Lee Westwood. He totalled 40-under par across the two tournament victories. With these wins, he became the first European to win four PGA Tour events in a single season and the only person other than Tiger Woods to win four events in a season since 2005.

McIlroy topped the qualification standings for the 2012 Ryder Cup, which was held at Medinah Country Club at the end of September. He picked up three points for the European team. On the final day, a mix up with his tee time meant that he arrived only 12 minutes before he was due to tee off in his Sunday singles match against Keegan Bradley, after being escorted in by a police officer. He defeated Bradley, 2 and 1, to help Europe record a comeback win by a score of 14.5–13.5, in what became known as the "Miracle at Medinah". To finish off his season, he won the DP World Tour Championship, Dubai in November, making birdie on the last five holes to beat Justin Rose by two strokes.

=== 2013: Equipment change, downturn in form ===
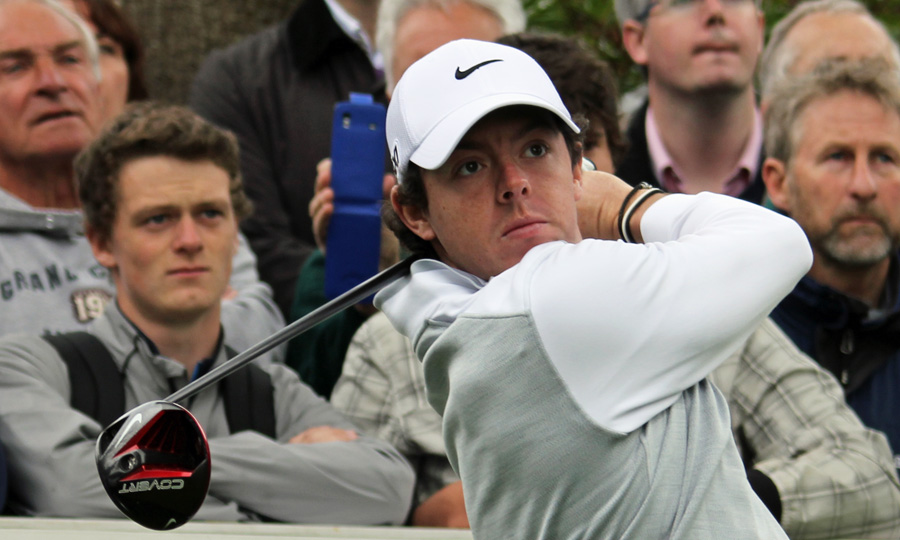
McIlroy at the 2013 BMW PGA Championship

McIlroy struggled with an equipment change at the beginning of 2013, having signed a lucrative endorsement deal with Nike in January. He missed the cut at the Abu Dhabi HSBC Golf Championship in January and withdrew from the Honda Classic as the defending champion in February.

In April, he finished runner-up at the Valero Texas Open, two strokes behind Martin Laird, and at the 2013 Masters Tournament the following week, he tied for 25th place. McIlroy tied for 41st place at the 2013 U.S. Open, missed the cut at the 2013 Open Championship and tied for 8th place as defending champion at the 2013 PGA Championship.

As a result of his downturn in form, he dropped from first to sixth in the OWGR. McIlroy recorded his first win of the year in December, at the 2013 Emirates Australian Open. He birdied the final hole to beat Australian Adam Scott by one stroke.

=== 2014: First Open Championship, second PGA Championship title ===
In January, McIlroy finished runner-up again in the Abu Dhabi HSBC Golf Championship. He was assessed a two-shot penalty for taking an improper drop from a spectator pathway in the third round and ultimately finished one stroke behind the winner Pablo Larrazábal. He said afterwards: "There are many stupid rules in golf and this is one of them."

In March, McIlroy lost in a playoff at the Honda Classic on the PGA Tour. He held a two-shot lead entering the final round, but shot 74 (+4) and lost on the first extra hole, when Russell Henley made birdie. In May, McIlroy shot a final-round 66 to overcome a seven-shot deficit and win the 2014 BMW PGA Championship by one stroke over Thomas Bjørn. The win was McIlroy's first on either of the two major tours in 18 months.

At the 2014 Open Championship held at Royal Liverpool Golf Club in July, McIlroy led wire-to-wire and won by two strokes over Rickie Fowler and Sergio García to claim the first Open Championship and third major championship of his career. The victory put McIlroy alongside Tiger Woods as the only golfers to win both the Silver Medal and the Claret Jug at the Open Championship.

In his next start, McIlroy won the 2014 WGC-Bridgestone Invitational, shooting a final-round 66 to beat Sergio García by two strokes. The following week, McIlroy edged out runner-up Phil Mickelson by one shot to collect his fourth major championship victory with a win at the 2014 PGA Championship at Valhalla Golf Club in Louisville, Kentucky. In doing so, he joined Jack Nicklaus and Tiger Woods as the only three players to win four majors by age 25. After the victory, 18-time major champion Nicklaus said: "Rory is an unbelievable talent. I think Rory has an opportunity to win 15 or 20 majors or whatever he wants to do if he wants to keep playing. I love his swing."

At the 2014 Ryder Cup in September, McIlroy played in all five sessions. He finished with a record of 2–1–2, including a win in his Sunday singles match against Rickie Fowler, as Europe won by a score of 16.5–11.5.

=== 2015: Four-win season ===
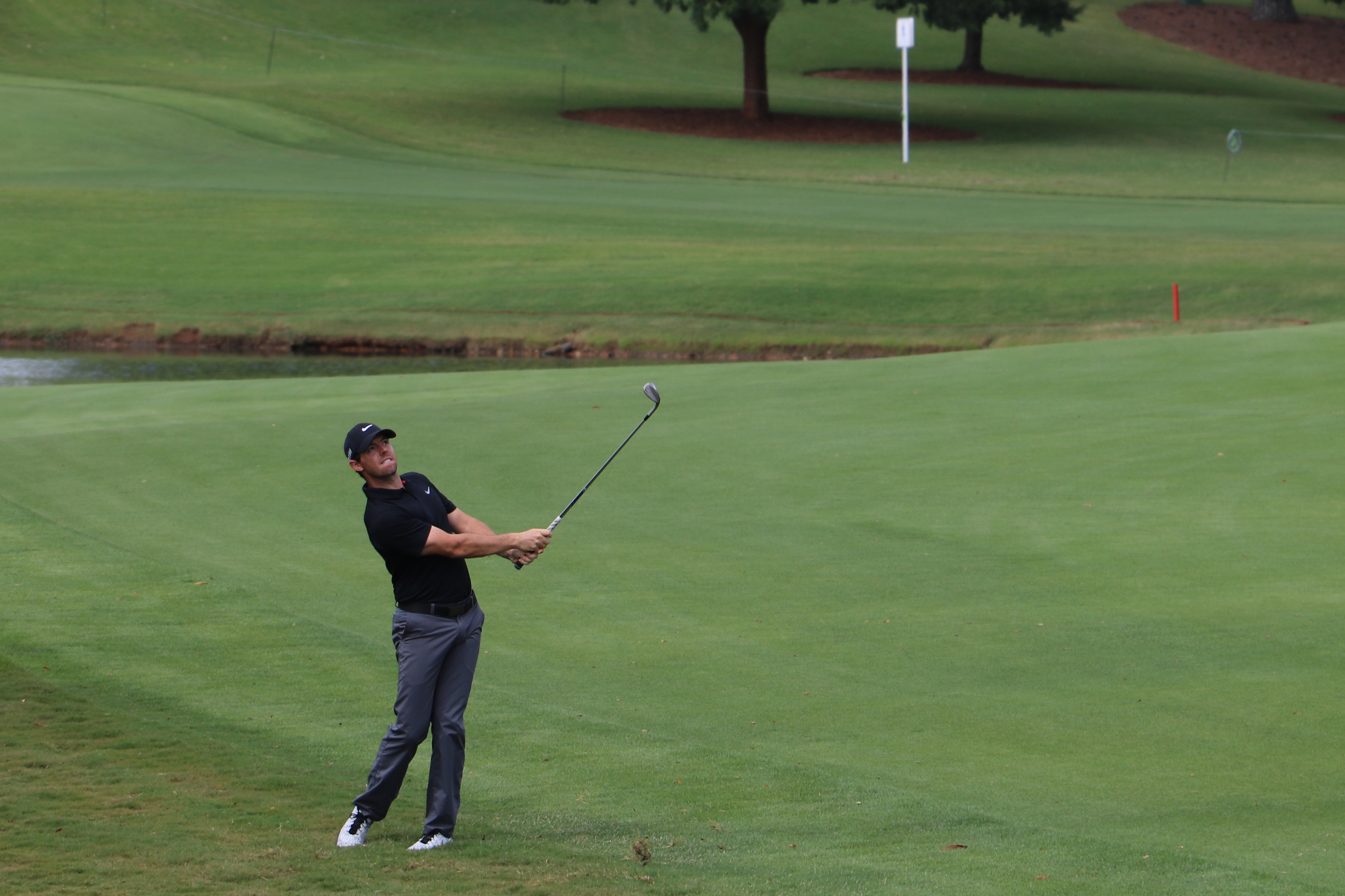
McIlroy during practice rounds at the 2015 Tour Championship at East Lake Golf Club

In January, McIlroy finished runner-up for the fourth time of his career at the Abu Dhabi Golf Championship, one stroke behind Gary Stal. In his second tournament of the year, he won the European Tour's Omega Dubai Desert Classic for a second time. At 22-under-par, he matched the tournament's scoring record set by Stephen Gallacher and Thomas Bjørn. He missed the cut in his first start of the PGA Tour season at the Honda Classic. It was his first missed cut on the PGA Tour since the 2013 Open Championship, a streak of 22 consecutive events.

At the 2015 Masters Tournament in April, McIlroy finished in solo-fourth place, a new-best career Masters finish. In May, he won the 2015 WGC-Cadillac Match Play event held at TPC Harding Park in San Francisco, defeating Gary Woodland in the final. This was his second World Golf Championship and his tenth PGA tour title. Later in May, while playing in the Wells Fargo Championship, McIlroy shot a course-record 61 at Quail Hollow Club in Charlotte, North Carolina. He went on to win the championship for a second time, by seven strokes with a tournament record score of 21-under 267.

A week prior to the 2015 Open Championship in July, McIlroy ruptured his left anterior talofibular ligament while playing soccer. This led to him withdrawing from the Open Championship and the subsequent 2015 WGC-Bridgestone Invitational, both tournaments where he was the defending champion. He made his return at the 2015 PGA Championship, where he made the cut and finished in 17th place. Entering the DP World Tour Championship, Dubai, McIlroy was leading the Race to Dubai standings. He posted a score of 21-under to win the tournament by one stroke from Andy Sullivan. This was his second victory in the lucrative year-end tournament and his third Race to Dubai title in four years.

=== 2016: First FedEx Cup title ===
Chasing his first win of the year, McIlroy took a three-shot lead into the final round of the 2016 WGC-Cadillac Championship at Trump National Doral in March, but faltered with a two-over-par 74 to finish two shots behind winner Adam Scott. At the 2016 Masters Tournament, McIlroy was in the final group in the third round alongside Jordan Spieth but shot a five-over 77 and ultimately finished tied-10th. Afterwards, he said he was affected at the Masters by the pressure of trying to complete the Grand Slam.

In May, McIlroy claimed his first victory of the year at his home Irish Open, a tournament hosted by the Rory Foundation. He finished three strokes clear of Russell Knox and Bradley Dredge and subsequently donated the €666,000 winner's cheque to charity. McIlroy had qualified to represent Ireland in the golf tournament at the 2016 Summer Olympics in August, but withdrew due to the threat of the Zika virus in Brazil and stated he would not watch the tournament. Following the tournament, McIlroy admitted he had been surprised at the event's success and said he had been wrong to dismiss the tournament. He later outlined his intention to compete at the 2020 Olympic Games.

In September, McIlroy won the Deutsche Bank Championship in Norton, Massachusetts. He produced a final-round 65 to finish two shots clear of Paul Casey. Two weeks later, at the 2016 Tour Championship, McIlroy overcame a two-shot deficit after the third round to force a playoff with Ryan Moore and Kevin Chappell, winning the competition with a birdie at the fourth playoff hole. The result earned McIlroy his first FedEx Cup title, along with the $10 million bonus prize. At the 2016 Ryder Cup in October, McIlroy played five matches and won three points, all when paired with Thomas Pieters. In the Sunday singles, he lost to Patrick Reed, 1 up, due to a birdie by Reed at the last hole, as the United States defeated Europe 17–11.

=== 2017: Winless season, injury problems ===
At the end of 2016, Nike announced their withdrawal from the golf equipment market, releasing players from their contracts early. After spending several months trying different clubs and balls, McIlroy signed a $100 million endorsement deal with TaylorMade.

McIlroy did not win during 2017, the first time he had a winless year since 2008. He was hampered throughout the season by a rib injury first sustained at the BMW SA Open in January, where he lost out on the title in a playoff to Graeme Storm, McIlroy played a limited schedule as a result of injury, although he did record top-10 finishes at both the 2017 Masters Tournament and 2017 Open Championship. In his final start of the season, McIlroy finished tied-63rd at the Alfred Dunhill Links Championship in October. He said after the event that he was going to take a three-month break to recuperate from his injuries. Having started the year at 2nd in the OWGR, McIlroy dropped to 11th by the end of the year.

Late in the 2017 season, McIlroy parted ways with JP Fitzgerald, who had been his caddie since 2008, and hired Harry Diamond, a former Irish amateur international golfer and childhood friend of McIlroy. McIlroy said he had been "inundated" with caddie requests, including from Jim "Bones" Mackay and Tiger Woods's former caddie Steve Williams, but decided to opt for Diamond on a permanent basis after a successful trial period.

=== 2018–2019: First Players Championship title, second FedEx Cup ===
McIlroy returned after over 100 days away from professional competition at the Abu Dhabi HSBC Championship in January 2018. Prior to the tournament, he said he had been diagnosed with a slight heart irregularity but downplayed its impact on his golf. The following week, McIlroy finished runner-up to Li Haotong in the Omega Dubai Desert Classic. He lost by one stroke, having led by two with five holes to play. It was the 22nd runner-up finish of his career. In March 2018, McIlroy won the Arnold Palmer Invitational with a final-round 64, his first win since the 2016 Tour Championship.

At the 2018 Masters Tournament, which was his tenth Masters start, McIlroy was in the final pairing on Sunday alongside Patrick Reed, three strokes off the lead. McIlroy shot a two-over 74 to finish in a tie for fifth, six strokes behind the winner, Reed. McIlroy was also in contention at the 2018 Open Championship, where he finished runner-up, two strokes behind Francesco Molinari. In September 2018, McIlroy competed in the 2018 Ryder Cup. He went 2–3–0, including a loss in the Sunday singles to Justin Thomas, as Team Europe beat Team USA 17.5–10.5 to reclaim the Ryder Cup.

McIlroy started 2019 on the PGA Tour in good form with five straight top-6 finishes, including a runner-up finish in February at the 2019 WGC-Mexico Championship, five strokes behind Dustin Johnson. McIlroy subsequently won the 2019 Players Championship in March with a score of −16. With the win, he joined Jack Nicklaus and Tiger Woods as the only players to win four majors and 15 PGA Tour titles before the age of 30.

In June 2019, McIlroy won the RBC Canadian Open. He shot a final-round 61 to win the tournament by seven strokes and became the sixth golfer to win the career Triple Crown (the PGA Tour's three oldest events being the Open Championship, the U.S. Open and the Canadian Open). Two months later, McIlroy clinched his second FedEx Cup title by winning the Tour Championship at East Lake Golf Club. The winning payout was $15 million, the largest in golf history. He became the second player to win multiple FedEx Cups, after Tiger Woods (2007, 2009).

In November 2019, McIlroy won the 2019 WGC-HSBC Champions tournament in a playoff against Xander Schauffele in Shanghai, China. The following month, McIlroy stated that he turned down an invitation to the European Tour's Saudi International tournament in Riyadh, stating that it is "not something that would excite me" and "there's a morality to it as well", in reference to Saudi Arabia's human rights record.

=== 2020–2021: Return to world number one ===
McIlroy began 2020 with four consecutive top-5 finishes on the PGA Tour, which, along with his four wins in the previous calendar year, brought him back to world number one in the OWGR for the first time since 2015. Amidst the suspension of professional tournaments due to the COVID-19 pandemic, McIlroy, alongside Dustin Johnson, secured a win in a charity skins game in May 2020 played under the nearest-the-pin shot rule, as golf returned to television after nine weeks. The event raised around £4 million for relief efforts. In July, McIlroy lost his spot at world number one to Jon Rahm.

At the delayed 2020 U.S. Open held in September, McIlroy finished in a tie for 8th place. He also recorded a top-5 finish at the 2020 Masters Tournament, which was delayed until November. In January 2021, McIlroy held the 54-hole lead at the Abu Dhabi HSBC Championship. A final round 72 saw him finish in third place, five shots behind eventual winner Tyrrell Hatton. In May 2021, McIlroy won the Wells Fargo Championship at Quail Hollow Club by one stroke, which was his third win at Quail Hollow and his 19th PGA Tour victory.

McIlroy represented Ireland at the Olympic Games in August 2021. He tied for third after 72 holes and lost in a seven-man playoff for the bronze medal. In September, he played on the European team in the 2021 Ryder Cup at Whistling Straits in Kohler, Wisconsin. The US team won 19–9 and McIlroy went 1–3–0, including a win in his Sunday singles match against Xander Schauffele.

In October 2021, McIlroy won the CJ Cup. He shot 62-66 on the weekend to win by one stroke over Collin Morikawa. This was his 20th PGA Tour victory, earning him life membership. In November, McIlroy held the 54-hole lead at the DP World Tour Championship, Dubai, as he sought to become the first player to win the event for a third time. He faltered with a final-round 74 and ultimately finished five shots behind the winner Morikawa.

=== 2022: Top 10 at all four majors, third FedEx Cup title ===
In January, McIlroy was in contention to win the Slync.io Dubai Desert Classic for the third time in his career but hit his second shot into the water on the final hole and missed out on a playoff for the title by one stroke. At the 2022 Masters Tournament In April, McIlroy shot a bogey-free 64 in the final round to finish as runner-up, a new-best finish at the Masters of his career. In May, McIlroy held the first-round lead at the 2022 PGA Championship after opening with a 65. He ultimately finished 8th.

In June, McIlroy defended his title at the RBC Canadian Open, shooting a final-round 62 to win by two shots ahead of Tony Finau. The following week, he finished tied-5th at the 2022 U.S. Open. In July, McIlroy was tied for the lead after 54 holes at the 2022 Open Championship. He shot a final-round 70 to finish third, two strokes behind Cameron Smith. He thus finished top-10 in all four majors for the first time in his career.

In August, McIlroy won his third Tour Championship, by one stroke from Scottie Scheffler and Im Sung-jae, to claim his third FedEx Cup victory. This victory surpassed Tiger Woods's two successes and earned McIlroy an additional $18 million bonus. In September, he finished tied-second at the BMW PGA Championship, losing to Shane Lowry by one shot.

In October, McIlroy successfully defended the CJ Cup at Congaree Golf Club in South Carolina. This victory also saw him return to number one in the Official World Golf Ranking, overtaking Scottie Scheffler. In November, McIlroy entered the DP World Tour Championship on the European Tour sitting in first place on the DP World Tour Rankings. A fourth-place finish was enough for McIlroy to maintain his position at the top of the rankings. It was also his fourth Harry Vardon Trophy win.

=== 2023: Continued success, fifth Race to Dubai title ===
McIlroy started off the year by winning the Hero Dubai Desert Classic In January. He birdied the final two holes to beat Patrick Reed by one shot. McIlroy missed the cut at the 2023 Masters Tournament in April, and finished tied-7th at the 2023 PGA Championship in May.

At the 2023 U.S. Open in June, McIlroy finished solo-second, one shot behind Wyndham Clark. In the final round of the U.S. Open, McIlroy received an incorrect drop after officials determined his ball was "plugged in the ground" and then misidentified the nearest point of relief. The USGA later acknowledged their error, but since McIlroy’s ball was dropped within 18 inches of the correct spot and he earned no advantage from its placement, no penalty was given. In July, McIlroy won the Genesis Scottish Open, one stroke ahead of Robert MacIntyre. The following week, at the 2023 Open Championship, he finished tied-sixth.

In September, McIlroy played on the European team in the 2023 Ryder Cup at Marco Simone Golf and Country Club in Rome, Italy. The European team won 16.5–11.5 and McIlroy was the top points scorer with a 4–1–0 record, including a win in his Sunday singles match against Sam Burns. In November, McIlroy won his fifth Race to Dubai title; he finished tied-22nd at the DP World Tour Championship, but had already secured the Race to Dubai title before the tournament started. This moved McIlroy to third for most season-long titles won on the European Tour, behind Seve Ballesteros's six and Colin Montgomerie's eight.

=== 2024: Four-win season, U.S. Open loss ===
McIlroy opened his season at the inaugural Dubai Invitational in January. He led by one shot with one hole remaining, before hitting his tee shot on the final hole into the water. He bogeyed the hole while Tommy Fleetwood made birdie to win by one. He defended the Hero Dubai Desert Classic the following week, his fourth win in the tournament overall. Trailing by 11 shots entering Saturday, he shot a nine-under 63 to propel him into contention before a final round two-under 70 gave him a one shot win over Adrian Meronk.

After a tepid start to the season on the PGA Tour, including a T22 finish at the 2024 Masters Tournament, McIlroy won his first title of the season in April at the Zurich Classic of New Orleans, a team event where he competed alongside Ryder Cup teammate Shane Lowry. They won in a playoff over Chad Ramey and Martin Trainer. This was McIlroy's 25th win on the PGA Tour. In his next start, McIlroy won the Wells Fargo Championship for the fourth time in his career. He closed with a 6-under 65, playing the final 11 holes in 6-under and won by five strokes over Xander Schauffele.

During the 2024 U.S. Open, McIlroy entered the final round in second-place, three strokes behind the lead. He erased the deficit and had a two-stroke lead over Bryson DeChambeau with four holes to play, but bogeyed three of the final four holes, including missed putts from inside four feet on both the 16th and 18th holes, to finish one stroke behind DeChambeau. At the 2024 Open Championship, McIlroy shot 78-75 and missed the cut, extending his major championship drought to ten years.

In September, after the Tour Championship, McIlroy turned his attention to the European Tour, recording back-to-back runner-up finishes at the Amgen Irish Open and the BMW PGA Championship, in which he lost in a playoff to Billy Horschel. In November, at the season's penultimate event, he finished tied-third at the Abu Dhabi HSBC Championship. The following week, he won the DP World Tour Championship, also claiming the Race to Dubai title for the sixth time in his career.

=== 2025: Completion of career grand slam, sixth Ryder Cup win ===
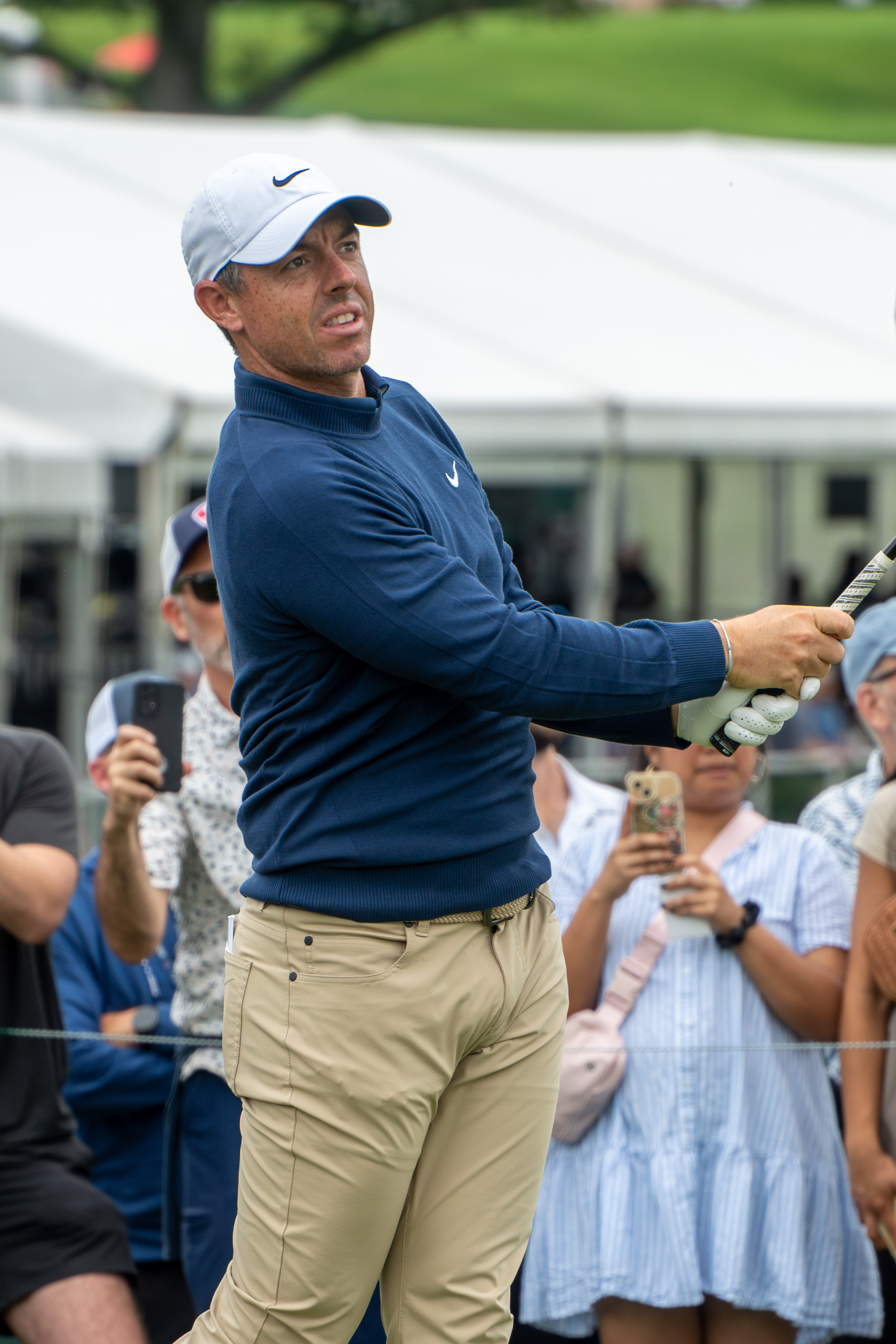
McIlroy at the Travelers Championship in June 2025

In his first PGA Tour event of 2025, McIlroy won the AT&T Pebble Beach Pro-Am, finishing with a score of −21, beating Shane Lowry by two strokes. At the 2025 Players Championship in March, McIlroy shot a final-round 68 to tie for first with J. J. Spaun and entered a three-hole aggregate playoff. McIlroy won the playoff with an aggregate score of +1 to claim his second Players Championship title. Two weeks later, he finished tied-fifth at the Texas Children's Houston Open and earned $337,844, which took his career earnings on the PGA Tour to $100,046,906. This made McIlroy the second man to reach $100 million in official PGA Tour earnings, joining Tiger Woods who crossed the mark in 2012.

In April, at the 2025 Masters Tournament, McIlroy held a two-stroke lead after 54 holes, which was his first 54-hole outright lead at a major since the 2014 PGA Championship. He shot a 1-over 73 in the final round while Justin Rose birdied six of his final eight holes to force a playoff. McIlroy birdied the first playoff hole to win his first Masters and complete the career grand slam. He became the sixth player, after Gene Sarazen, Ben Hogan, Gary Player, Jack Nicklaus and Tiger Woods, to win each of the four major championships in the modern era.

In his next major championship start, McIlroy tied for 47th at the 2025 PGA Championship, held at Quail Hollow Club, a course where he had previously recorded four wins. He then missed his first cut of the year at the RBC Canadian Open, shooting rounds of 71-78. After the 2025 U.S. Open, where he finished tied-19th, McIlroy stated he had lost motivation since winning the Masters: "I climbed my Everest in April, and I think after you do something like that, you've got to make your way back down, and you've got to look for another mountain to climb."

In July, McIlroy finished runner-up at the Genesis Scottish Open, two shots behind Chris Gotterup. The following week, McIlroy was the home favourite in the 2025 Open Championship held at Royal Portrush Golf Club. He finished tied-seventh. At the Amgen Irish Open in September, McIlroy holed a 27-foot (8.2 m) putt for eagle on the final hole to match the 17-under 271 posted by Joakim Lagergren and enter a playoff. McIlroy made birdie on the third extra hole to win his national open for the second time in his career.

McIlroy represented Europe at the 2025 Ryder Cup, held at Bethpage Black in September. He had a 3–1–1 record, including a loss in the Sunday singles against world number one Scottie Scheffler, as Europe defeated the United States by a score of 15–13, which was the first away victory in a Ryder Cup since 2012. This marked the sixth time he won the event with team Europe. In November, McIlroy made eagle on the final hole of the DP World Tour Championship to force a playoff against Matt Fitzpatrick. McIlroy lost the title to Fitzpatrick on the first playoff hole, but the runner-up finish secured his seventh Race to Dubai title, overtaking Seve Ballesteros's tally of six and moving within one of the record held by Colin Montgomerie.

=== 2026: Second Masters title ===
McIlroy finished runner-up at the Genesis Invitational in February, one stroke behind Jacob Bridgeman. As defending champion at the 2026 Players Championship in March, McIlroy placed tied-46th. He struggled prior to the Players with a back injury which had forced him to withdraw from the Arnold Palmer Invitational a week earlier.

In his title defence at the 2026 Masters Tournament, McIlroy opened with rounds of 67-65 to total 12-under and establish a six-stroke lead. This broke the record for largest 36-hole lead in Masters history, surpassing the five-shot margin first set by Harry Cooper in 1936. McIlroy's lead vanished after a 73 in the third round and he was reduced to co-leader alongside Cameron Young. McIlroy closed with a 1-under 71 to claim his second Masters title, finishing one stroke ahead of Scottie Scheffler. With the victory, he joined Jack Nicklaus (1966), Nick Faldo (1990) and Tiger Woods (2002) as the only players to successfully defend their titles at the Masters. McIlroy also drew level with Faldo, Phil Mickelson and Lee Trevino with six major championships. The CBS broadcast of McIlroy's victory averaged 14 million viewers, which was the highest viewership since the 2015 Masters Tournament.

=== Awards ===
At the 2005 Belfast Telegraph Sports Awards, McIlroy received the Young Player of the Year award. He also won the 2008 George Best Breakthrough Prize and the 2009 Belfast Telegraph Sports Star of the Year award.

In recognition of his win at the 2011 U.S. Open, McIlroy was named the 2011 RTÉ Sports Person of the Year and BBC Northern Ireland Sports Personality of the Year. He also received the Laureus World Sports Award for Breakthrough of the Year, and was appointed Member of the Order of the British Empire (MBE) in the 2012 New Year Honours, for services to sport.

In 2012, McIlroy won the PGA Player of the Year and PGA Tour Player of the Year awards, as well as the Vardon Trophy and Byron Nelson Award. He was also voted the European Tour Golfer of the Year and European Tour Players' Player of the Year in 2012. He repeated this award sweep in 2014. Also in 2014, he was named RTÉ Sports Person of the Year for a second time, and BBC Northern Ireland Sports Personality of the Year for a third time.

McIlroy has won the Mark H. McCormack Award for leading the Official World Golf Ranking for the most weeks in a calendar year three times: 2012, 2014 and 2015. In 2019, he won the PGA Tour Player of the Year award and the Vardon Trophy for the third time. In 2022, McIlroy won the Vardon Trophy for a fourth time. His scoring average of 68.67 was the lowest since Tiger Woods's 68.05 in 2009. In 2024, McIlroy won the European Tour Player of the Year award, now renamed the Seve Ballesteros Award, for the fourth time in his career.

McIlroy won BBC Sports Personality of the Year in 2025, topping the public vote; he had previously been shortlisted in 2014 and 2023, finishing as runner-up in 2014. McIlroy was also named the 2025 RTÉ Sports Person of the Year. This made him the first person to win both these awards in the same year since Barry McGuigan in 1985.

== Technique and coaches ==
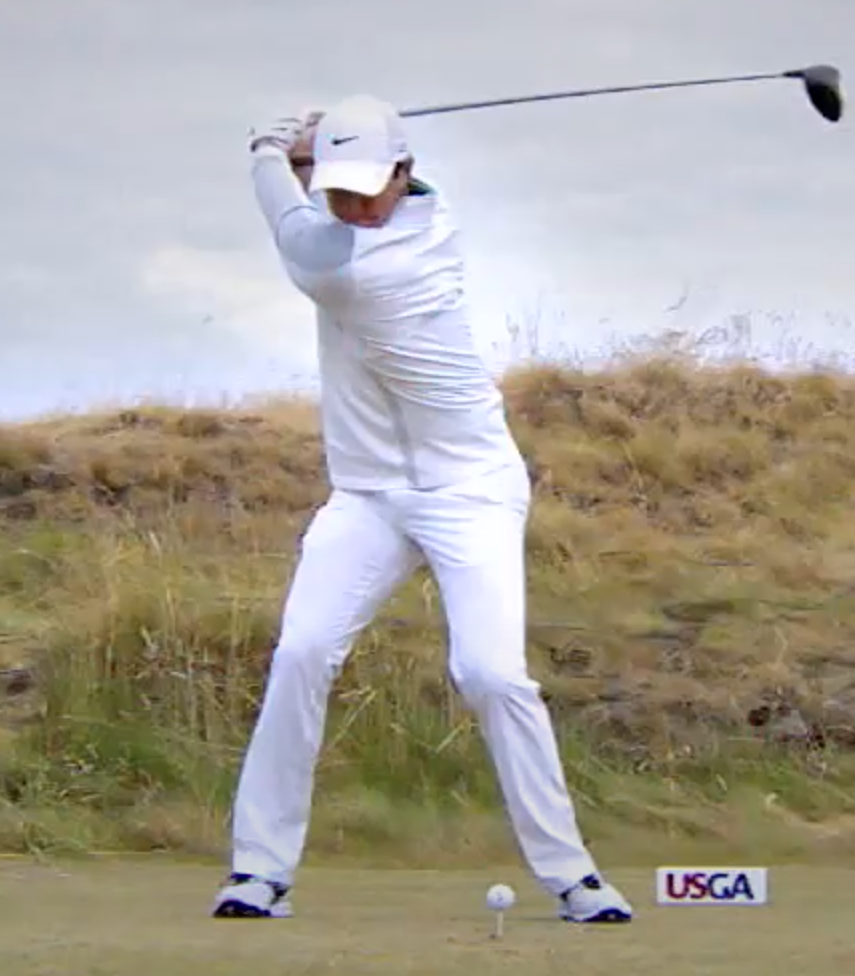
McIlroy in the process of hitting a tee shot with his driver

Despite his modest stature at 5 feet 9 inches (1.75 m), McIlroy has consistently been among the longest drivers in professional golf throughout his career. He had a "grip-it-and-rip-it" style with a long, fluid swing when he first came out on tour. McIlroy developed back problems by the age of 19, requiring the use of heavy strapping and anti-inflammatory medication while playing. He was warned by a doctor that he likely would develop a stress fracture in his back if he did not change his approach. McIlroy began to work with exercise physiologist Stephen McGregor in 2010, who noted imbalances in McIlroy's body: "He couldn't stand on one leg. He didn't have support and stability in his shoulders. ... He was very arm-speed-dominated in his golf swing, as a lot of young players are, trying to generate as much speed as they can to launch the golf ball."

McGregor, along with McIlroy's long-time coach Michael Bannon, set about rebuilding McIlroy's swing. He started a strict workout regimen, focused on developing strength in his legs and core to generate speed from the ground up and reduce strain on the back. As a result, his clubhead speed became faster than before. McIlroy said in 2017 that he had a degenerative disc in his lumbar vertebrae, adding: "I've been swinging a golf club since I was two years old. That's millions of swings over time, and that takes its toll." He credited McGregor as having the biggest impact of anyone on his golf career, stating that McGregor's guidance had helped him to take better care of his body and extend his career. As of 2025, McIlroy is capable of producing over 190 miles per hour (310 km/h) ball speed.

McIlroy struggled with his putting at the start of his career and began to work with specialist coach Paul Hurrion in 2008, who stated that McIlroy was overly reliant on hand-eye coordination when putting. McIlroy also was introduced to Bob Rotella's book Putting Out of Your Mind in late 2009. McIlroy later obtained putting instruction from former PGA Tour player Dave Stockton and credited him after winning the 2012 PGA Championship for the improvements in his putting. McIlroy underwent laser eye surgery in 2015, having previously used contact lenses while on the course. He said: "I've always felt I struggled reading greens. I've always struggled with my eyes, especially in the summer with hayfever, when you're rubbing your eyes and sometimes things would get under the contact lens," and that after the surgery he had "better than 20/20 vision". Since 2018, former PGA Tour player Brad Faxon has been McIlroy's putting coach. Faxon was known as one of the best putters on tour during his career.

== Public image ==
McIlroy has been regarded as one of the most marketable athletes in the world since early on in his career. He was an ambassador for hotel chain Jumeirah from 2007 to 2012, and signed a multimillion-dollar sponsorship agreement with Santander Bank in 2011. SportsPro rated him at third, behind Neymar and Lionel Messi, in their 2013 list of the world's most marketable athletes. In 2013, McIlroy signed a 10-year endorsement deal with Nike worth up to $250 million, whereby he agreed to be a brand ambassador for their golf clubs, balls and apparel. According to Simon Chadwick, professor of sport business strategy and marketing at Coventry University, Nike viewed McIlroy as their successor to Tiger Woods, who was struggling on and off the course at the time. Also in that year, McIlroy signed endorsement deals with Bose and Omega. In 2015, McIlroy became the namesake for the EA Sports video game Rory McIlroy PGA Tour, replacing Tiger Woods, who had been the previous namesake for the series from 1998 to 2013. In 2017, McIlroy signed a 10-year, $200-million contract extension with Nike for apparel only, after Nike exited the golf equipment business, allowing him to additionally sign a 10-year, $100-million equipment deal with TaylorMade to use their clubs, ball and bag.

After the emergence of LIV Golf in 2022, McIlroy became a vocal opponent of the Saudi-funded league and some of the prominent individuals associated with it, such as Greg Norman and Phil Mickelson. Sports Business Journal stated that McIlroy "took on the unofficial role as face of the PGA Tour in its battle with LIV Golf". McIlroy criticised the league for having "ripped apart" the game of professional golf. Before the start of the Hero Dubai Desert Classic in January 2023, McIlroy was approached by LIV golfer Patrick Reed while on the practice range. He refused to talk to Reed, stating afterwards when asked in a press conference that Reed had sent a lawyer to serve him a subpoena on the Christmas Eve prior as part of an anti-trust lawsuit. In June 2023, after the PGA Tour announced a framework agreement for a potential merger with LIV Golf, McIlroy said that he felt like a "sacrificial lamb" due to his support of the PGA Tour. He maintained that "If LIV Golf was the last place to play golf on Earth, I would retire." McIlroy softened his stance against LIV Golf in 2024, stating that he had been "a little judgemental" towards golfers who joined LIV, adding "I wouldn't say I've lost the fight against LIV, but I've just accepted the fact that this is part of our sport now." Following the announcement in 2026 that Saudi Arabia's Public Investment Fund would withdraw its multibillion-dollar funding of LIV Golf, McIlroy said: "it doesn't mean that LIV is going to go away. ... But when one of the wealthiest sovereign wealth funds in the world thinks that you're too expensive for them, that sort of says something."

== Business endeavours ==
When turning professional in 2007, McIlroy signed with International Sports Management (ISM), an agency founded by former professional golfer Chubby Chandler. McIlroy left ISM in 2011, and stated he felt like he was being "led down the wrong path" by Chandler, who advised McIlroy to give up his PGA Tour card in 2010 and prioritise the European Tour. McIlroy then signed with Horizon Sports Management, following the lead of his friend Graeme McDowell who had left ISM to join Horizon. McIlroy split from Horizon in 2013. He had agreed a contract extension with the agency in March 2013, which was set to run until 2017. In October 2013, he described the contract as "unconscionable" and said he had been coaxed into signing it. He filed suit against Horizon, claiming they had prioritised their own financial interests to his detriment. Horizon countersued, alleging breach of contract and unpaid fees. A legal battle followed, which ended with an out-of-court settlement in 2015. The Irish Times reported that McIlroy paid the firm in excess of $25 million plus costs to settle the dispute.

After splitting from Horizon in 2013, McIlroy created a new management company, Rory McIlroy Management Services Ltd. Initially headed by former Irish Life and Permanent executive Donal Casey as managing director alongside McIlroy's father Gerry as a director, it manages the royalty payments from McIlroy's various endorsements. The company is based in Dublin. In 2017, McIlroy ranked sixth in Forbes's list of the world's highest-paid athletes, having earned $50 million, of which $34 million came from endorsements.

In 2019, McIlroy founded Symphony Ventures, a venture capital firm, alongside his long-time agent Sean O'Flaherty. Headquartered in Dublin, it focuses on the healthcare, sports and technology sectors. McIlroy began wearing a Whoop band in 2019 and was among the investors in a $100-million Series E financing round for the company in 2020. He joined the investment group of the Alpine racing team of Formula One in 2023, and the ticket marketplace TickPick in 2024. McIlroy founded TMRW Sports in 2022, alongside Tiger Woods and former Golf Channel executive Mike McCarley. The company's first project was TGL, an indoor golf league which secured a broadcasting deal with ESPN. A funding round in 2024 valued TMRW Sports at $500 million.

In May 2025, McIlroy partnered with private equity firm TPG to form TPG Sports, an investment fund targeting the sports sector. In December 2025, McIlroy announced a new joint venture with Golf Channel parent company Versant known as Firethorn Productions (named after the 15th hole at Augusta National), and an extension of his contract with the company through 2038.

== Personal life ==
McIlroy was raised Catholic and has self-identified as Irish, Northern Irish, and British. He stated in 2010 that he carries a British passport, although he usually is reluctant to discuss his nationality at length. During the Troubles, McIlroy's great-uncle Joe McIlroy was shot to death by the Ulster Volunteer Force in a sectarian attack at his home in 1972, after he moved his Catholic family into the predominantly-Protestant area of Orangefield, Belfast. Despite this family trauma, McIlroy's parents refused to become embittered. McIlroy attended a mixed school that was majority Protestant and stated his Catholic background "was never an issue". Regarding the Troubles, McIlroy said in 2012: "I haven't talked about it with my parents. I don't want to be defined by that. It's not how my generation thinks."

As golf was named an Olympic sport for the first time since 1904 at the 2016 Summer Olympics, McIlroy was regularly questioned whether he would represent Great Britain or Ireland. He stated in 2013: "I feel Northern Irish and obviously being from Northern Ireland you have a connection to Ireland and a connection to the UK. If I could and there was a Northern Irish team I'd play for Northern Ireland. Play for one side or the other – or not play at all because I may upset too many people ... Those are my three options I'm considering very carefully." On the eve of the 2014 Irish Open, he declared that he would represent Ireland at the Olympics.

In 2009, McIlroy bought a house in Moneyreagh, a small village south of Belfast. The house sat on a 13-acre plot of land, where he had a custom-made practice facility and a scaled-down association football pitch. McIlroy hired security guards for the property after he won the 2011 U.S. Open, as the increased attention led to strangers driving up his driveway. He said he began to feel like he was living in a goldfish bowl. In September 2012, the house was put up for sale for a price of £2 million. In December 2012, McIlroy purchased a $10-million property in Palm Beach Gardens, Florida, located close to Jack Nicklaus's Bear's Club. McIlroy has also maintained residences in Monaco and Dubai. In 2024, McIlroy took delivery of a Gulfstream G650ER, a private jet. He previously owned a Bombardier Challenger 605. In 2025, McIlroy moved into a home in the Wentworth Estate in Surrey.

McIlroy is a fan of Manchester United F.C. Following his 2014 Open Championship win at Royal Liverpool, he made reference to his support for Liverpool's rivals during his acceptance speech, prompting light-hearted boos from the crowd. McIlroy is also a fan of the Northern Ireland national team. In his spare time, he played football himself. McIlroy injured his ankle ligaments in 2015, while playing with friends, forcing him to withdraw from the 2015 Open Championship. He said in December of that year: "I really can't be doing silly things like playing football in the middle of the season ... I won't be making those mistakes again." McIlroy is a fan of Ulster Rugby and has interrupted his busy golf schedule to attend matches at Ravenhill Stadium in Belfast. McIlroy said in 2023 that he is a fan of the Buffalo Bills, as his wife Erica is originally from Irondequoit, New York. McIlroy stated: "It certainly makes it easier to root for the Bills when Josh Allen is throwing the football."

In 2018, McIlroy appeared on an episode of Amazon Prime show The Grand Tour, racing against Paris Hilton in the "Celebrity Face-Off" segment of the show. McIlroy featured in the sports documentary series Full Swing, which premiered on Netflix in 2023. McIlroy made a cameo appearance in the 2025 film Happy Gilmore 2. He also made a cameo appearance in The Devil Wears Prada 2 (2026).

=== Relationships ===
McIlroy dated Danish tennis player Caroline Wozniacki from 2011 to 2014. They became engaged in December 2013. McIlroy ended the engagement in May 2014: "The problem is mine. The wedding invitations issued at the weekend made me realise that I wasn't ready for all that marriage entails. I wish Caroline all the happiness she deserves and thank her for the great times we've had."

McIlroy started dating Erica Stoll, a former PGA of America employee, in 2015. In December that year, they became engaged while on holiday in Paris. They married in April 2017 at Ashford Castle in Cong, County Mayo. The couple had a daughter in September 2020. In May 2024, McIlroy filed for divorce in Palm Beach County, Florida. By June 2024, the divorce filing was withdrawn, with McIlroy stating: "We have resolved our differences and look forward to a new beginning."

=== Philanthropy ===
McIlroy became an ambassador for UNICEF Ireland in 2011, and visited Haiti with UNICEF in June of that year. He cancelled a trip to Haiti with UNICEF in 2013 as it conflicted with his participation in the Valero Texas Open. McIlroy's management team Horizon then donated $166,000 of his money to UNICEF without his knowledge, to "avoid any bad publicity". McIlroy had been advised by his then-partner Caroline Wozniacki against donating to NGOs such as UNICEF and instead to create a foundation. McIlroy reversed the donation, and was upset that his management team had made the transaction without his approval.

In 2013, McIlroy created The Rory Foundation, with a stated goal of supporting children's charities. Through the foundation, McIlroy pledged £1 million in 2014 to the Cancer Fund for Children in Newcastle, County Down. During 2016, the foundation dispensed a total of £1.15 million to charities in Ireland and the United Kingdom, of which £862,543 was donated directly by McIlroy. The foundation shut down in December 2018, with a spokeswoman of the foundation stating that McIlroy "is adopting a private philanthropic policy". It was announced in 2023 that McIlroy had paid €1 million towards the construction of a Cancer Fund for Children lodge in Cong, County Mayo.

== Amateur wins ==
- 2005 West of Ireland Championship, Irish Amateur Close Championship
- 2006 West of Ireland Championship, Irish Amateur Close Championship, European Amateur
- 2007 Grey Goose Cup

== Professional wins (45) ==
=== PGA Tour wins (30) ===
Legend
Major championships (6)
Players Championships (2)
World Golf Championships (3)
FedEx Cup playoff events (6)
Signature events (2)
Other PGA Tour (11)

No.	Date	Tournament	Winning score	To par	Margin of victory	Runner(s)-up
1	2 May 2010	Quail Hollow Championship	72-73-66-62=273	−15	4 strokes	(United States) Phil Mickelson
2	19 Jun 2011	U.S. Open	65-66-68-69=268	−16	8 strokes	(Australia) Jason Day
3	4 Mar 2012	The Honda Classic	66-67-66-69=268	−12	2 strokes	(United States) Tom Gillis, (United States) Tiger Woods
4	12 Aug 2012	PGA Championship	67-75-67-66=275	−13	8 strokes	(England) David Lynn
5	3 Sep 2012	Deutsche Bank Championship	65-65-67-67=264	−20	1 stroke	(South Africa) Louis Oosthuizen
6	9 Sep 2012	BMW Championship	64-68-69-67=268	−20	2 strokes	(United States) Phil Mickelson, (England) Lee Westwood
7	20 Jul 2014	The Open Championship	66-66-68-71=271	−17	2 strokes	(United States) Rickie Fowler, (Spain) Sergio García
8	3 Aug 2014	WGC-Bridgestone Invitational	69-64-66-66=265	−15	2 strokes	(Spain) Sergio García
9	10 Aug 2014	PGA Championship (2)	66-67-67-68=268	−16	1 stroke	(United States) Phil Mickelson
10	3 May 2015	WGC-Cadillac Match Play	4 and 2			(United States) Gary Woodland
11	17 May 2015	Wells Fargo Championship (2)	70-67-61-69=267	−21	7 strokes	(United States) Patrick Rodgers, (United States) Webb Simpson
12	5 Sep 2016	Deutsche Bank Championship (2)	71-67-66-65=269	−15	2 strokes	(England) Paul Casey
13	25 Sep 2016	Tour Championship	68-70-66-64=268	−12	Playoff	(United States) Kevin Chappell, (United States) Ryan Moore
14	18 Mar 2018	Arnold Palmer Invitational	69-70-67-64=270	−18	3 strokes	(United States) Bryson DeChambeau
15	17 Mar 2019	The Players Championship	67-65-70-70=272	−16	1 stroke	(United States) Jim Furyk
16	9 Jun 2019	RBC Canadian Open	67-66-64-61=258	−22	7 strokes	(Republic of Ireland) Shane Lowry, (United States) Webb Simpson
17	25 Aug 2019	Tour Championship (2)	66-67-68-66=267	−18^{1}	4 strokes	(United States) Xander Schauffele
18	3 Nov 2019	WGC-HSBC Champions	67-67-67-68=269	−19	Playoff	(United States) Xander Schauffele
19	9 May 2021	Wells Fargo Championship (3)	72-66-68-68=274	−10	1 stroke	(Mexico) Abraham Ancer
20	17 Oct 2021	CJ Cup	68-67-62-66=263	−25	1 stroke	(United States) Collin Morikawa
21	12 Jun 2022	RBC Canadian Open (2)	66-68-65-62=261	−19	2 strokes	(United States) Tony Finau
22	28 Aug 2022	Tour Championship (3)	67-67-63-66=263	−21^{2}	1 stroke	(South Korea) Im Sung-jae, (United States) Scottie Scheffler
23	23 Oct 2022	CJ Cup (2)	66-67-67-67=267	−17	1 stroke	(United States) Kurt Kitayama
24	16 Jul 2023	Genesis Scottish Open^{3}	64-66-67-68=265	−15	1 stroke	(Scotland) Robert MacIntyre
25	28 Apr 2024	Zurich Classic of New Orleans (with (Republic of Ireland) Shane Lowry)	61-70-64-68=263	−25	Playoff	(United States) Chad Ramey and (France) Martin Trainer
26	12 May 2024	Wells Fargo Championship (4)	67-68-67-65=267	−17	5 strokes	(United States) Xander Schauffele
27	2 Feb 2025	AT&T Pebble Beach Pro-Am	66-70-65-66=267	−21	2 strokes	(Republic of Ireland) Shane Lowry
28	17 Mar 2025	The Players Championship (2)	67-68-73-68=276	−12	Playoff	(United States) J. J. Spaun
29	13 Apr 2025	Masters Tournament	72-66-66-73=277	−11	Playoff	(England) Justin Rose
30	12 Apr 2026	Masters Tournament (2)	67-65-73-71=276	−12	1 stroke	(United States) Scottie Scheffler

^{1}Started tournament at −5 FedEx Cup playoffs adjustment, scored −13 to par.
^{2}Started tournament at −4 FedEx Cup playoffs adjustment, scored −17 to par.
^{3}Co-sanctioned by the European Tour

PGA Tour playoff record (5–2)

No.	Year	Tournament	Opponent(s)	Result
1	2012	Wells Fargo Championship	(United States) Rickie Fowler, (United States) D. A. Points	Fowler won with birdie on first extra hole
2	2014	The Honda Classic	(United States) Russell Henley, (Scotland) Russell Knox, (United States) Ryan Palmer	Henley won with birdie on first extra hole
3	2016	Tour Championship	(United States) Kevin Chappell, (United States) Ryan Moore	Won with birdie on fourth extra hole Chappell eliminated by birdie on first hole
4	2019	WGC-HSBC Champions	(United States) Xander Schauffele	Won with birdie on first extra hole
5	2024	Zurich Classic of New Orleans (with (Republic of Ireland) Shane Lowry)	(United States) Chad Ramey and (France) Martin Trainer	Won with par on first extra hole
6	2025	The Players Championship	(United States) J. J. Spaun	Won three-hole aggregate playoff; McIlroy: +1 (4-4-5=13), Spaun: x (5-6-x=x)
7	2025	Masters Tournament	(England) Justin Rose	Won with birdie on first extra hole

=== European Tour wins (21) ===
Legend
Major championships (6)
World Golf Championships (3)
Flagship events (1)
Tour C'ships/Race to Dubai finals series/Playoff events (3)
Rolex Series (4) (Note: The 2024 DP World Tour Championship was also a Rolex Series tournament.)
Other European Tour (5)

No.	Date	Tournament	Winning score	To par	Margin of victory	Runner(s)-up
1	1 Feb 2009	Dubai Desert Classic	64-68-67-70=269	−19	1 stroke	(England) Justin Rose
2	19 Jun 2011	U.S. Open	65-66-68-69=268	−16	8 strokes	(Australia) Jason Day
3	4 Dec 2011	UBS Hong Kong Open^{1}	64-69-70-65=268	−12	2 strokes	(France) Grégory Havret
4	12 Aug 2012	PGA Championship	67-75-67-66=275	−13	8 strokes	(England) David Lynn
5	25 Nov 2012	DP World Tour Championship, Dubai	66-67-66-66=265	−23	2 strokes	(England) Justin Rose
6	25 May 2014	BMW PGA Championship	68-71-69-66=274	−14	1 stroke	(Republic of Ireland) Shane Lowry
7	20 Jul 2014	The Open Championship	66-66-68-71=271	−17	2 strokes	(United States) Rickie Fowler, (Spain) Sergio García
8	3 Aug 2014	WGC-Bridgestone Invitational	69-64-66-66=265	−15	2 strokes	(Spain) Sergio García
9	10 Aug 2014	PGA Championship (2)	66-67-67-68=268	−16	1 stroke	(United States) Phil Mickelson
10	1 Feb 2015	Omega Dubai Desert Classic (2)	66-64-66-70=266	−22	3 strokes	(Sweden) Alex Norén
11	3 May 2015	WGC-Cadillac Match Play	4 and 2			(United States) Gary Woodland
12	22 Nov 2015	DP World Tour Championship, Dubai (2)	68-68-65-66=267	−21	1 stroke	(England) Andy Sullivan
13	22 May 2016	Dubai Duty Free Irish Open	67-70-70-69=276	−12	3 strokes	(Wales) Bradley Dredge, (Scotland) Russell Knox
14	3 Nov 2019	WGC-HSBC Champions	67-67-67-68=269	−19	Playoff	(United States) Xander Schauffele
15	30 Jan 2023	Hero Dubai Desert Classic (3)	66-70-65-68=269	−19	1 stroke	(United States) Patrick Reed
16	16 Jul 2023	Genesis Scottish Open^{2}	64-66-67-68=265	−15	1 stroke	(Scotland) Robert MacIntyre
17	21 Jan 2024	Hero Dubai Desert Classic (4)	71-70-63-70=274	−14	1 stroke	(Poland) Adrian Meronk
18	17 Nov 2024	DP World Tour Championship (3)	67-69-68-69=273	−15	2 strokes	(Denmark) Rasmus Højgaard
19	13 Apr 2025	Masters Tournament	72-66-66-73=277	−11	Playoff	(England) Justin Rose
20	7 Sep 2025	Amgen Irish Open (2)	71-66-68-66=271	−17	Playoff	(Sweden) Joakim Lagergren
21	12 Apr 2026	Masters Tournament (2)	67-65-73-71=276	−12	1 stroke	(United States) Scottie Scheffler

^{1}Co-sanctioned by the Asian Tour
^{2}Co-sanctioned by the PGA Tour

European Tour playoff record (3–6)

No.	Year	Tournament	Opponent(s)	Result
1	2008	Omega European Masters	(France) Jean-François Lucquin	Lost to birdie on second extra hole
2	2008	UBS Hong Kong Open	(Taiwan) Lin Wen-tang, (Italy) Francesco Molinari	Lin won with birdie on second extra hole Molinari eliminated by birdie on first hole
3	2017	BMW SA Open	(England) Graeme Storm	Lost to par on third extra hole
4	2019	Omega European Masters	(Italy) Lorenzo Gagli, (Argentina) Andrés Romero, (Finland) Kalle Samooja, (Sweden) Sebastian Söderberg	Söderberg won with birdie on first extra hole
5	2019	WGC-HSBC Champions	(United States) Xander Schauffele	Won with birdie on first extra hole
6	2024	BMW PGA Championship	(United States) Billy Horschel, (South Africa) Thriston Lawrence	Horschel won with eagle on second extra hole Lawrence eliminated by birdie on first hole
7	2025	Masters Tournament	(England) Justin Rose	Won with birdie on first extra hole
8	2025	Amgen Irish Open	(Sweden) Joakim Lagergren	Won with birdie on third extra hole
9	2025	DP World Tour Championship	(England) Matt Fitzpatrick	Lost to par on first extra hole

=== PGA Tour of Australasia wins (1) ===
Legend
Flagship events (1)
Other PGA Tour of Australia (0)

No.	Date	Tournament	Winning score	To par	Margin of victory	Runner-up
1	1 Dec 2013	Emirates Australian Open^{1}	69-65-70-66=270	−18	1 stroke	(Australia) Adam Scott

^{1}Co-sanctioned by the OneAsia Tour

=== Other wins (3) ===
No.	Date	Tournament	Winning score	To par	Margin of victory	Runner(s)-up
1	22 Jul 2009	Lough Erne Challenge	68	−4	2 strokes	(Republic of Ireland) Pádraig Harrington
2	21 Jul 2010	Lough Erne Challenge (2) (with (Northern Ireland) Darren Clarke)	66	−6	1 stroke	(Republic of Ireland) Pádraig Harrington and (Republic of Ireland) Shane Lowry
3	30 Oct 2011	Lake Malaren Shanghai Masters	64-69-65-72=270	−18	Playoff	(United States) Anthony Kim

Other playoff record (1–0)

No.	Year	Tournament	Opponent	Result
1	2011	Lake Malaren Shanghai Masters	(United States) Anthony Kim	Won with par on first extra hole

== Major championships ==
=== Wins (6) ===
Year	Championship	54 holes	Winning score	Margin	Runner(s)-up
2011	U.S. Open	8 shot lead	−16 (65-66-68-69=268)	8 strokes	(Australia) Jason Day
2012	PGA Championship	3 shot lead	−13 (67-75-67-66=275)	8 strokes	(England) David Lynn
2014	The Open Championship	6 shot lead	−17 (66-66-68-71=271)	2 strokes	(United States) Rickie Fowler, (Spain) Sergio García
2014	PGA Championship (2)	1 shot lead	−16 (66-67-67-68=268)	1 stroke	(United States) Phil Mickelson
2025	Masters Tournament	2 shot lead	−11 (72-66-66-73=277)	Playoff^{1}	(England) Justin Rose
2026	Masters Tournament (2)	Tied	–12 (67-65-73-71=276)	1 stroke	(United States) Scottie Scheffler

^{1}Defeated Rose in a sudden-death playoff: McIlroy (3), Rose (4).

=== Results timeline ===
Results not in chronological order in 2020.

Tournament	2007	2008	2009
Masters Tournament			T20
U.S. Open			T10
The Open Championship	T42LA		T47
PGA Championship			T3

Tournament	2010	2011	2012	2013	2014	2015	2016	2017	2018
Masters Tournament	CUT	T15	T40	T25	T8	4	T10	T7	T5
U.S. Open	CUT	1	CUT	T41	T23	T9	CUT	CUT	CUT
The Open Championship	T3	T25	T60	CUT	1		T5	T4	T2
PGA Championship	T3	T64	1	T8	1	17	CUT	T22	T50

Tournament	2019	2020	2021	2022	2023	2024	2025	2026
Masters Tournament	T21	T5	CUT	2	CUT	T22	1	1
PGA Championship	T8	T33	T49	8	T7	T12	T47	T7
U.S. Open	T9	T8	T7	T5	2	2	T19	T32
The Open Championship	CUT	NT	T46	3	T6	CUT	T7	T40

Win
Top 10
Did not play

LA = low amateur
CUT = missed the halfway cut
"T" = tied
NT = no tournament due to COVID-19 pandemic

=== Summary ===
Tournament	Wins	2nd	3rd	Top-5	Top-10	Top-25	Events	Cuts made
Masters Tournament	2	1	0	6	9	14	18	15
PGA Championship	2	0	2	4	9	12	18	17
U.S. Open	1	2	0	4	9	11	18	13
The Open Championship	1	1	2	6	8	9	18	15
Totals	6	4	4	20	35	46	72	60

- Most consecutive cuts made – 9 (2013 PGA – 2016 Masters)
- Longest streak of top-10s – 4 (twice)

== The Players Championship ==
=== Wins (2) ===
Year	Championship	54 holes	Winning score	Margin	Runner-up
2019	The Players Championship	1 shot deficit	−16 (67-65-70-70=272)	1 stroke	(United States) Jim Furyk
2025	The Players Championship	4 shot deficit	−12 (67-68-73-68=276)	Playoff	(United States) J. J. Spaun

=== Results timeline ===
Tournament	2009	2010	2011	2012	2013	2014	2015	2016	2017	2018	2019
The Players Championship	CUT	CUT		CUT	T8	T6	T8	T12	T35	CUT	1

Tournament	2020	2021	2022	2023	2024	2025	2026
The Players Championship	C	CUT	T33	CUT	T19	1	T46

Win
Top 10
Did not play

CUT = missed the halfway cut
"T" indicates a tie for a place
C = cancelled after the first round due to the COVID-19 pandemic

== World Golf Championships ==
=== Wins (3) ===
Year	Championship	54 holes	Winning score	Margin	Runner-up
2014	WGC-Bridgestone Invitational	3 shot deficit	−15 (69-64-66-66=265)	2 strokes	(Spain) Sergio García
2015	WGC-Cadillac Match Play	n/a	4 and 2		(United States) Gary Woodland
2019	WGC-HSBC Champions	1 shot lead	−19 (67-67-67-68=269)	Playoff	(United States) Xander Schauffele

=== Results timeline ===
Results not in chronological order before 2015.

Tournament	2009	2010	2011	2012	2013	2014	2015	2016	2017	2018	2019	2020	2021	2022	2023
Championship	T20	T65	T10	3	T8	T25	T9	T3	T7		2	5	T6		
Match Play	QF	R32	R32	2	R64	R32	1	4	T30	T36	R16	NT^{1}	T28		3
Invitational	T68	T9	T6	T5	T27	1			T5	T6	T4	T47	T12		
Champions	4	5	T4		T6		T11	T4		T54	1	NT^{1}	NT^{1}	NT^{1}	

^{1}Cancelled due to COVID-19 pandemic

Win
Top 10
Did not play

QF, R16, R32, R64 = Round in which player lost in match play
NT = no tournament
"T" = tied
Note that the Championship and Invitational were discontinued from 2022. The Champions was discontinued from 2023.

== Professional career summary ==
=== European Tour ===
Season	Starts	Cuts made	Wins	2nd	3rd	Top 10	Top 25	Earnings (€)	Order of Merit rank
2005	3	0	0	0	0	0	0	(amateur)	n/a
2006	1	0	0	0	0	0	0	(amateur)	n/a
2007	8	6	0	0	1	2	2	277,255	95
2008	28	16	0	1	0	6	10	696,335	36
2009	25	24	1	3	3	14	18	2,862,413	2
2010	16	14	0	0	3	9	11	1,657,187	13
2011	19	19	2	2	3	12	17	3,171,787	2
2012	15	13	2	3	2	10	10	4,738,026	1
2013	13	10	0	0	0	4	5	862,177	35
2014	14	13	4	3	0	9	13	5,883,304	1
2015	12	10	3	1	0	8	10	4,540,010	1
2016	13	12	1	0	3	10	10	2,971,988	5
2017	12	10	0	2	0	6	7	1,832,091	13
2018	13	12	0	3	1	6	8	2,526,233	7
2019	12	11	1	2	0	8	9	3,093,919	6
2020	5	5	0	0	0	3	3	1,110,743	20
2021	11	9	0	0	1	3	5	1,417,505	19
2022	10	10	0	2	2	9	10	5,546,161	1
2023	10	9	2	1	1	7	9	7,475,321	1
2024	12	11	2	4	1	8	11	9,170,632	1
2025	11	11	2	2	1	7	9	7,959,150	1
Career*	263	221	20	29	22	142	179	67,792,236	1

*Through the 2025 DP World Tour season. Money prize figures are rounded up to nearest Euro.

=== PGA Tour ===
Season	Starts	Cuts made	Wins (majors)	2nd	3rd	Top-10	Top-25	Earnings ($)	Money list rank	FedEx Cup rank	Scoring avg (adj)	Scoring rank
2007	1	1	0	0	0	0	0	(amateur)	n/a (Note: McIlroy was not a member of the PGA Tour in 2007, 2009 or 2011 so he was not included on the money list or the scoring average list.)	n/a		
2009	11	10	0	0	1	3	7	849,719	n/a	n/a	70.21	n/a
2010	16	12	1	0	2	5	6	2,554,280	26	36	70.35	33
2011	10	9	1 (1)	0	0	4	7	1,905,609	n/a	n/a	69.48	n/a
2012	16	13	4 (1)	2	1	10	11	8,047,952	1	2	68.87	1
2013	16	14	0	1	0	5	7	1,802,443	41	50	70.29	34
2013–14	17	17	3 (2)	2	0	12	17	8,280,096	1	3	68.83	1
2014–15	12	11	2	0	0	7	10	4,863,312	7	15	68.32	–
2015–16	18	15	2	0	1	8	11	5,790,585	4	1	69.64	6
2016–17	14	12	0	0	0	6	8	2,430,182	39	58	69.53	6
2017–18	18	14	1	1	0	7	11	4,410,296	14	T13	69.30	5
2018–19	19	17	3	1	0	14	16	7,785,286	2	1	69.06	1
2019–20	15	15	1	0	2	7	9	4,408,415	8	8	69.22	4
2020–21	21	18	1	0	0	7	14	4,391,809	20	T14	70.043	16
2021-22	16	14	3	1	1	10	13	8,654,566	5	1	68.67	1
2022-23	18	16	2	2	1	13	13	13,921,008	4	4	68.77	2
2024	19	18	2	1	1	7	15	10,893,790	4	9	69.91	5
2025	16	15	3 (1)	1	0	8	14	16,992,412	3	23	69.08	2
Career (Note: As of 2024 season.)	273	241	29 (5)	12	11	133	189	107,981,766	2			

- Note that there is double counting of money earned (and wins) in the majors and World Golf Championships since they are official events on both tours.

== Team appearances ==
Amateur

- European Boys' Team Championship (representing Ireland): 2004
- Junior Ryder Cup (representing Europe): 2004 (winners)
- European Amateur Team Championship (representing Ireland): 2005, 2007 (winners)
- European Youths' Team Championship (representing Ireland): 2006
- Eisenhower Trophy (representing Ireland): 2006
- St Andrews Trophy (representing Great Britain & Ireland): 2006 (winners)
- Walker Cup (representing Great Britain & Ireland): 2007
- Bonallack Trophy (representing Europe): 2006 (winners)

Professional

- Ryder Cup (representing Europe): 2010 (winners), 2012 (winners), 2014 (winners), 2016, 2018 (winners), 2021, 2023 (winners), 2025 (winners)
- Seve Trophy (representing Great Britain & Ireland): 2009 (winners)
- World Cup (representing Ireland): 2009, 2011

Ryder Cup points record
2010	2012	2014	2016	2018	2021	2023	2025	Total
2	3	3	3	2	1	4	3.5	21.5

== See also ==
- List of golfers with most European Tour wins
- List of golfers with most PGA Tour wins
- List of men's major championships winning golfers
