= Yoshitaka Takeya =

Japanese golfer

Personal information
- Nationality: Japan
- Born: 27 January 1980 (age 46) Yamaguchi Prefecture, Japan
- Height: 1.69 m (5 ft 7 in)
- Weight: 66 kg (146 lb; 10.4 st)

Career
- Sport: Golf
- Status: Professional
- Current tour: Japan Golf Tour
- Former tour: Japan Challenge Tour
- Professional wins: 2

Number of wins by tour
- Japan Golf Tour: 1
- Other: 1

Yoshitaka Takeya (竹谷 佳孝, Takeya Yoshitaka; born 27 January 1980) is a Japanese professional golfer.

== Career ==
Takeya plays on the Japan Golf Tour and the Japan Challenge Tour. He has one win on each tour. His win at the 2014 Japan Golf Tour Championship Mori Building Cup Shishido Hills earned him entry into the 2014 WGC-Bridgestone Invitational.

== Professional wins (2) ==
=== Japan Golf Tour wins (1) ===
Legend
Japan majors (1)
Other Japan Golf Tour (0)

No.	Date	Tournament	Winning score	Margin of victory	Runner-up
1	22 Jun 2014	Japan Golf Tour Championship; Mori Building Cup Shishido Hills	−17 (69-65-69-68=271)	2 strokes	(South Korea) Lee Sang-hee

=== Japan Challenge Tour wins (1) ===
No.	Date	Tournament	Winning score	Margin of victory	Runner-up
1	25 Oct 2013	JGTO Novil Final	−10 (69-66-71=206)	1 stroke	(Japan) Akinori Tani

== Results in World Golf Championships ==
Tournament	2014
Match Play	
Championship	
Invitational	T69
Champions	T73

Did not play

"T" = Tied
