= 2019 WGC-HSBC Champions =

Tournament information
- Dates: 31 October – 3 November 2019
- Location: Shanghai, China; 31.109°N 121.216°E
- Course: Sheshan Golf Club
- Tours: Asian Tour; European Tour; PGA Tour

Statistics
- Par: 72
- Length: 7,261 yards (6,639 m)
- Field: 78 players
- Cut: None
- Prize fund: $10,250,000
- Winner's share: $1,745,000

Champion
- (Northern Ireland) Rory McIlroy
- 269 (−19), playoff

Location map
- Location in China Location in Shanghai

The 2019 WGC-HSBC Champions was a golf tournament played from 31 October – 3 November 2019 at the Sheshan Golf Club in Shanghai, China. It was the eleventh WGC-HSBC Champions tournament, and the fourth of four World Golf Championships events held in the 2019 calendar year.

Rory McIlroy beat defending champion Xander Schauffele at the first hole of a sudden-death playoff after making a birdie 4 to Schauffele's par 5. It is his first WGC-HSBC Champions victory, and third World Golf Championship win overall, having already won the WGC Match Play and WGC Invitational.

== Field ==
The following is a list of players who qualified for the 2019 WGC-HSBC Champions. The criteria are towards the leaders in points lists rather than tournament winners. Players who qualified from multiple categories are listed in the first category in which they are eligible with the other qualifying categories in parentheses next to the player's name.

1. Winners of the four major championships and The Players Championship

Shane Lowry (3,5), Rory McIlroy (3,4)

- Brooks Koepka (2,3,4) did not play due to injury.
- Gary Woodland (3,4) and Tiger Woods (3) did not play.

2. Winners of the previous four World Golf Championships

Kevin Kisner (3,4), Xander Schauffele (3,4)

- Dustin Johnson (3,4) did not play due to injury.

3. Top 50 from the OWGR on 14 October

An Byeong-hun, Abraham Ancer (4), Keegan Bradley, Rafa Cabrera-Bello (5), Paul Casey (4,5), Tony Finau (4,5), Matt Fitzpatrick (5), Tommy Fleetwood (4,5), Sergio García (5), Adam Hadwin, Tyrrell Hatton, Billy Horschel, Im Sung-jae (4), Hideki Matsuyama (4), Phil Mickelson, Francesco Molinari (5), Louis Oosthuizen (4,5), Ian Poulter (5), Andrew Putnam, Chez Reavie (4), Patrick Reed (4), Justin Rose (4,5), Adam Scott (4), Jordan Spieth, Henrik Stenson, Matt Wallace (5), Bubba Watson, Bernd Wiesberger (5), Danny Willett (5)

- Patrick Cantlay (4), Jason Day, Bryson DeChambeau (4), Rickie Fowler (4), Jim Furyk, Matt Kuchar (4), Marc Leishman (4), Kevin Na, Eddie Pepperell, Jon Rahm (4,5), Webb Simpson (4), Brandt Snedeker (4), and Justin Thomas (4) did not play.

4. Top 30 from the final 2019 FedEx Cup Playoffs points list (if there are less than five available players, players beyond 30th will be selected to increase the number to five)

Corey Conners, Lucas Glover, Charles Howell III, Jason Kokrak, Kevin Tway

5. Top 30 from the Race to Dubai as of 21 October

Christiaan Bezuidenhout, Jorge Campillo, Justin Harding (9), Benjamin Hébert, Kurt Kitayama, Romain Langasque, Li Haotong, Mike Lorenzo-Vera, Joost Luiten, Robert MacIntyre, Andrea Pavan, Victor Perez, Richard Sterne, Erik van Rooyen, Paul Waring

6. The leading four available players from the Asian Tour HSBC Qualification Standings as of 21 October

Scott Hend, Jazz Janewattananond, Masahiro Kawamura, Jbe' Kruger

7. The leading two available players from the Japan Golf Tour Order of Merit as of 21 October

Ryo Ishikawa, Chan Kim

- Shugo Imahira did not play.

8. The leading two available players from the final 2018 PGA Tour of Australasia Order of Merit

Jake McLeod, Matthew Millar

9. The leading two available players from the final 2018–19 Sunshine Tour Order of Merit

Bryce Easton, Zander Lombard

10. Six players from China

Bai Zhengkai, Dou Zecheng, Liang Wenchong, Wu Ashun, Yuan Yechun, Zhang Xinjun

11. Alternates, if needed to fill the field of 78 players

- The next available player on the Orders of Merit of the Asian Tour, Japan Golf Tour, Sunshine Tour, and PGA Tour of Australasia, ranked in order of their position in the OWGR as of 14 October
- Next available player, not otherwise exempt, from Race to Dubai as of 21 October, OWGR as of 14 October, final 2019 FedEx Cup list

1. Mikumu Horikawa (Japan Golf Tour; Shaun Norris did not play)
2. Neil Schietekat (Sunshine Tour)
3. Lee Tae-hee (Asian Tour)
4. Daniel Nisbet (PGA Tour of Australasia)
5. Matthias Schwab (Race to Dubai)
6. Cameron Smith (OWGR)
7. J. T. Poston (FedEx Cup)
8. Yosuke Asaji (Japan Golf Tour)
9. Chang Yi-keun (Asian Tour)

== Round summaries ==
=== First round ===
Thursday, 31 October 2019

Li Haotong took a one-shot lead over Victor Perez by shooting an 8-under-par 64. Defending champion Xander Schauffele was two strokes back in a tied for third.

Place	Player	Score	To par
1	(China) Li Haotong	64	−8
2	(France) Victor Perez	65	−7
T3	(England) Matt Fitzpatrick	66	−6
T3	(South Korea) Im Sung-jae	66	−6
T3	(United States) Xander Schauffele	66	−6
T3	(Australia) Adam Scott	66	−6
T7	(Canada) Corey Conners	67	−5
T7	(Northern Ireland) Rory McIlroy	67	−5
T7	(Austria) Matthias Schwab	67	−5
T10	(Mexico) Abraham Ancer	68	−4
T10	(South Africa) Louis Oosthuizen	68	−4
T10	(England) Danny Willett	68	−4
T10	(China) Zhang Xinjun	68	−4

=== Second round ===
Friday, 1 November 2019

Matt Fitzpatrick shot a 5-under-par 67 to take a one shot lead over Rory McIlroy. First round leader Li Haotong shot 72 to drop into a tied for sixth place. Defending champion Xander Schauffele remained in a tied for third place with a second round 69.

Place	Player	Score	To par
1	(England) Matt Fitzpatrick	66-67=133	−11
2	(Northern Ireland) Rory McIlroy	67-67=134	−10
T3	(South Korea) Im Sung-jae	66-69=135	−9
T3	(United States) Xander Schauffele	66-69=135	−9
T3	(Australia) Adam Scott	66-69=135	−9
T6	(China) Li Haotong	64-72=136	−8
T6	(France) Victor Perez	65-71=136	−8
8	(South Africa) Louis Oosthuizen	68-69=137	−7
T9	(Austria) Matthias Schwab	67-71=138	−6
T9	(England) Paul Waring	73-65=138	−6

=== Third round ===
Saturday, 2 November 2019

Place	Player	Score	To par
1	(Northern Ireland) Rory McIlroy	67-67-67=201	−15
2	(South Africa) Louis Oosthuizen	68-69-65=202	−14
T3	(England) Matt Fitzpatrick	66-67-70=203	−13
T3	(United States) Xander Schauffele	66-69-68=203	−13
5	(England) Paul Waring	73-65-66=204	−12
T6	(South Korea) Im Sung-jae	66-69-70=205	−11
T6	(United States) Jason Kokrak	69-70-66=205	−11
T8	(Mexico) Abraham Ancer	68-71-67=206	−10
T8	(United States) Kevin Kisner	72-67-67=206	−10
T10	(South Africa) Christiaan Bezuidenhout	69-72-66=207	−9
T10	(France) Victor Perez	65-71-71=207	−9
T10	(Austria) Matthias Schwab	67-71-69=207	−9

=== Final round ===
Sunday, 3 November 2019

==== Final leaderboard ====
Champion
(c) = past champion

Place	Player	Score	To par	Money ($)
1	(Northern Ireland) Rory McIlroy	67-67-67-68=269	−19	1,745,000
2	(United States) Xander Schauffele (c)	66-69-68-66=269	−19	1,095,000
3	(South Africa) Louis Oosthuizen	68-69-65-69=271	−17	602,000
T4	(Mexico) Abraham Ancer	68-71-67-67=273	−15	370,000
T4	(France) Victor Perez	65-71-71-66=273	−15	370,000
T4	(Austria) Matthias Schwab	67-71-69-66=273	−15	370,000
7	(England) Matt Fitzpatrick	66-67-70-71=274	−14	256,000
T8	(United States) Jason Kokrak	69-70-66-71=276	−12	200,333
T8	(United States) Patrick Reed	72-69-69-66=276	−12	200,333
T8	(England) Paul Waring	73-65-66-72=276	−12	200,333

Leaderboard below the top 10
Place	Player	Score	To par	Money ($)
T11	(South Korea) Im Sung-jae	66-69-70-72=277	−11	155,000
T11	(Japan) Hideki Matsuyama (c)	75-67-68-67=277	−11	155,000
T11	(Australia) Adam Scott	66-69-75-67=277	−11	155,000
T14	(South Korea) An Byeong-hun	69-71-69-69=278	−10	127,000
T14	(England) Tyrrell Hatton	72-73-68-65=278	−10	127,000
T14	(Thailand) Jazz Janewattananond	70-69-69-70=278	−10	127,000
T17	(South Africa) Christiaan Bezuidenhout	69-72-66-72=279	−9	111,000
T17	(Scotland) Robert MacIntyre	70-69-73-67=279	−9	111,000
T17	(China) Yuan Yechun	69-70-74-66=279	−9	111,000
T20	(Canada) Corey Conners	67-73-74-66=280	−8	99,000
T20	(Sweden) Henrik Stenson	70-70-70-70=280	−8	99,000
T22	(Japan) Masahiro Kawamura	72-74-66-69=281	−7	92,500
T22	(Italy) Francesco Molinari (c)	74-67-71-69=281	−7	92,500
T24	(United States) Keegan Bradley	73-72-71-66=282	−6	85,000
T24	(United States) Billy Horschel	69-71-73-69=282	−6	85,000
T24	(China) Li Haotong	64-72-74-72=282	−6	85,000
T24	(United States) J. T. Poston	69-73-72-68=282	−6	85,000
T28	(Australia) Scott Hend	75-69-70-69=283	−5	76,667
T28	(United States) Kevin Kisner	72-67-67-77=283	−5	76,667
T28	(United States) Kurt Kitayama	70-72-73-68=283	−5	76,667
T28	(United States) Phil Mickelson (c)	71-69-75-68=283	−5	76,667
T28	(England) Justin Rose (c)	69-70-71-73=283	−5	76,667
T28	(United States) Bubba Watson (c)	70-69-72-72=283	−5	76,667
T34	(Spain) Jorge Campillo	73-69-70-72=284	−4	72,500
T34	(Netherlands) Joost Luiten	70-74-72-68=284	−4	72,500
T36	(United States) Charles Howell III	74-73-67-71=285	−3	70,500
T36	(United States) Andrew Putnam	71-71-73-70=285	−3	70,500
T38	(Japan) Yosuke Asaji	70-75-76-65=286	−2	67,000
T38	(England) Paul Casey	75-71-71-69=286	−2	67,000
T38	(France) Mike Lorenzo-Vera	70-74-72-70=286	−2	67,000
T38	(South Africa) Erik van Rooyen	73-71-71-71=286	−2	67,000
T38	(China) Zhang Xinjun	68-73-73-72=286	−2	67,000
T43	(South Africa) Bryce Easton	70-73-74-70=287	−1	63,000
T43	(Republic of Ireland) Shane Lowry	72-72-72-71=287	−1	63,000
T43	(United States) Jordan Spieth	70-73-74-70=287	−1	63,000
T46	(Canada) Adam Hadwin	74-77-69-68=288	E	60,000
T46	(United States) Chan Kim	71-70-75-72=288	E	60,000
T46	(France) Romain Langasque	75-68-69-76=288	E	60,000
T49	(United States) Lucas Glover	73-70-74-72=289	+1	56,500
T49	(Japan) Mikumu Horikawa	74-68-77-70=289	+1	56,500
T49	(Italy) Andrea Pavan	71-70-75-73=289	+1	56,500
T49	(Austria) Bernd Wiesberger	70-73-71-75=289	+1	56,500
T53	(United States) Tony Finau	69-70-75-76=290	+2	52,875
T53	(England) Tommy Fleetwood	74-76-73-67=290	+2	52,875
T53	(Spain) Sergio García	72-68-75-75=290	+2	52,875
T53	(South Africa) Justin Harding	75-74-71-70=290	+2	52,875
T57	(Spain) Rafa Cabrera-Bello	73-72-69-77=291	+3	51,000
T57	(Australia) Jake McLeod	70-73-79-69=291	+3	51,000
T57	(South Africa) Neil Schietekat	70-72-74-75=291	+3	51,000
T60	(South Africa) Jbe' Kruger	71-71-75-75=292	+4	49,150
T60	(United States) Chez Reavie	69-74-75-74=292	+4	49,150
T60	(Australia) Cameron Smith	70-72-74-76=292	+4	49,150
T60	(United States) Kevin Tway	71-72-72-77=292	+4	49,150
T60	(England) Matt Wallace	69-84-70-69=292	+4	49,150
T65	(France) Benjamin Hébert	70-74-77-73=294	+6	48,125
T65	(South Korea) Lee Tae-hee	75-73-73-73=294	+6	48,125
T67	(China) Dou Zecheng	71-80-72-72=295	+7	47,500
T67	(Japan) Ryo Ishikawa	69-79-74-73=295	+7	47,500
T67	(Australia) Matthew Millar	69-73-74-79=295	+7	47,500
T70	(China) Bai Zhengkai	73-76-74-73=296	+8	46,875
T70	(South Africa) Richard Sterne	72-75-74-75=296	+8	46,875
72	(South Africa) Zander Lombard	73-73-74-78=298	+10	46,500
T73	(China) Liang Wenchong	74-74-75-76=299	+11	46,000
T73	(England) Danny Willett	68-77-78-76=299	+11	46,000
T73	(China) Wu Ashun	80-71-72-76=299	+11	46,000
76	(South Korea) Chang Yi-keun	76-75-75-78=304	+16	45,500
77	(Australia) Daniel Nisbet	77-80-79-73=309	+21	45,250
WD	(England) Ian Poulter (c)	73-74=147	+3	–

==== Playoff ====
Place	Player	Score	To par	Money ($)
1	(Northern Ireland) Rory McIlroy	4	−1	1,745,000
2	(United States) Xander Schauffele	5	E	1,095,000

The sudden-death playoff started at the 18th hole.
