= 2013–14 PGA Tour =

Golf tour season

2013–14 PGA Tour season
- Duration: October 10, 2013 – September 14, 2014
- Number of official events: 45
- Most wins: (Northern Ireland) Rory McIlroy (3) (United States) Jimmy Walker (3)
- FedEx Cup: (United States) Billy Horschel
- Money list: (Northern Ireland) Rory McIlroy
- PGA Tour Player of the Year: (Northern Ireland) Rory McIlroy
- PGA Player of the Year: (Northern Ireland) Rory McIlroy
- Rookie of the Year: (United States) Chesson Hadley

The 2013–14 PGA Tour was the 99th season of the PGA Tour, the main professional golf tour in the United States. It was also the 46th season since separating from the PGA of America, and the eighth edition of the FedEx Cup.

== Schedule ==
The following table lists official events during the 2013–14 season.

Date	Tournament	Location	Purse (US$)	Winner (Note: The number in parentheses after each winner's name is the number of PGA Tour events they had won up to and including that tournament. This information is only shown for PGA Tour members.)	OWGR points	Other tours (Note: ASA − Asian Tour.)	Notes
Oct 13	Frys.com Open	California	5,000,000	(United States) Jimmy Walker (1)	28		
Oct 20	Shriners Hospitals for Children Open	Nevada	6,000,000	(United States) Webb Simpson (4)	36		
Oct 28	CIMB Classic	Malaysia	7,000,000	(United States) Ryan Moore (3)	48	ASA	Upgraded to official event Limited-field event
Nov 3	WGC-HSBC Champions	China	8,500,000	(United States) Dustin Johnson (8)	66		World Golf Championship
Nov 10	McGladrey Classic	Georgia	5,500,000	(United States) Chris Kirk (2)	32		
Nov 17	OHL Classic at Mayakoba	Mexico	6,000,000	(United States) Harris English (2)	24		
Jan 6	Hyundai Tournament of Champions	Hawaii	5,700,000	(United States) Zach Johnson (11)	46		Winners-only event
Jan 12	Sony Open in Hawaii	Hawaii	5,600,000	(United States) Jimmy Walker (2)	42		
Jan 19	Humana Challenge	California	5,700,000	(United States) Patrick Reed (2)	40		Pro-Am
Jan 26	Farmers Insurance Open	California	6,100,000	(United States) Scott Stallings (3)	52		
Feb 2	Waste Management Phoenix Open	Arizona	6,200,000	(United States) Kevin Stadler (1)	52		
Feb 9	AT&T Pebble Beach National Pro-Am	California	6,600,000	(United States) Jimmy Walker (3)	44		Pro-Am
Feb 16	Northern Trust Open	California	6,700,000	(United States) Bubba Watson (5)	56		
Feb 23	WGC-Accenture Match Play Championship	Arizona	9,000,000	(Australia) Jason Day (2)	72		World Golf Championship
Mar 2	The Honda Classic	Florida	6,000,000	(United States) Russell Henley (2)	60		
Mar 9	WGC-Cadillac Championship	Florida	9,000,000	(United States) Patrick Reed (3)	76		World Golf Championship
Mar 9	Puerto Rico Open	Puerto Rico	3,500,000	(United States) Chesson Hadley (1)	24		Alternate event
Mar 16	Valspar Championship	Florida	5,700,000	(Australia) John Senden (2)	50		
Mar 23	Arnold Palmer Invitational	Florida	6,200,000	(United States) Matt Every (1)	56		Invitational
Mar 30	Valero Texas Open	Texas	6,200,000	(Australia) Steven Bowditch (1)	40		
Apr 6	Shell Houston Open	Texas	6,400,000	(Australia) Matt Jones (1)	58		
Apr 13	Masters Tournament	Georgia	9,000,000	(United States) Bubba Watson (6)	100		Major championship
Apr 20	RBC Heritage	South Carolina	5,800,000	(United States) Matt Kuchar (7)	50		Invitational
Apr 27	Zurich Classic of New Orleans	Louisiana	6,800,000	(South Korea) Noh Seung-yul (1)	36		
May 4	Wells Fargo Championship	North Carolina	6,900,000	(United States) J. B. Holmes (3)	50		
May 11	The Players Championship	Florida	10,000,000	(Germany) Martin Kaymer (2)	80		Flagship event
May 18	HP Byron Nelson Championship	Texas	6,900,000	(United States) Brendon Todd (1)	44		
May 25	Crowne Plaza Invitational at Colonial	Texas	6,400,000	(Australia) Adam Scott (11)	54		Invitational
Jun 1	Memorial Tournament	Ohio	6,200,000	(Japan) Hideki Matsuyama (1)	64		Invitational
Jun 8	FedEx St. Jude Classic	Tennessee	5,800,000	(United States) Ben Crane (5)	42		
Jun 15	U.S. Open	North Carolina	9,000,000	(Germany) Martin Kaymer (3)	100		Major championship
Jun 22	Travelers Championship	Connecticut	6,200,000	(United States) Kevin Streelman (2)	48		
Jun 29	Quicken Loans National	Maryland	6,500,000	(England) Justin Rose (6)	48		Invitational
Jul 6	Greenbrier Classic	West Virginia	6,500,000	(Argentina) Ángel Cabrera (3)	42		
Jul 13	John Deere Classic	Illinois	4,700,000	(United States) Brian Harman (1)	34		
Jul 20	The Open Championship	England	£5,400,000	(Northern Ireland) Rory McIlroy (7)	100		Major championship
Jul 27	RBC Canadian Open	Canada	5,700,000	(South Africa) Tim Clark (2)	36		
Aug 3	WGC-Bridgestone Invitational	Ohio	9,000,000	(Northern Ireland) Rory McIlroy (8)	76		World Golf Championship
Aug 3	Barracuda Championship	Nevada	3,000,000	(Australia) Geoff Ogilvy (8)	24		Alternate event
Aug 10	PGA Championship	Kentucky	10,000,000	(Northern Ireland) Rory McIlroy (9)	100		Major championship
Aug 17	Wyndham Championship	North Carolina	5,300,000	(Colombia) Camilo Villegas (4)	34		
Aug 24	The Barclays	New Jersey	8,000,000	(United States) Hunter Mahan (6)	74		FedEx Cup playoff event
Sep 1	Deutsche Bank Championship	Massachusetts	8,000,000	(United States) Chris Kirk (3)	68		FedEx Cup playoff event
Sep 7	BMW Championship	Colorado	8,000,000	(United States) Billy Horschel (2)	70		FedEx Cup playoff event
Sep 14	Tour Championship	Georgia	8,000,000	(United States) Billy Horschel (3)	58		FedEx Cup playoff event

=== Unofficial events ===
The following events were sanctioned by the PGA Tour, but did not carry FedEx Cup points or official money, nor were wins official.

Date	Tournament	Location	Purse ($)	Winner(s)	OWGR points	Notes
Oct 16	PGA Grand Slam of Golf	Bermuda	1,350,000	(Australia) Adam Scott	n/a	Limited-field event
Nov 12	Wendy's 3-Tour Challenge	Nevada	1,000,000	LPGA Tour	n/a	Team event
Nov 24	ISPS Handa World Cup of Golf	Australia	1,000,000	(Australia) Jason Day and (Australia) Adam Scott	n/a	Team event
Nov 24	World Cup of Golf Individual Trophy	Australia	7,000,000	(Australia) Jason Day	40	
Dec 8	Northwestern Mutual World Challenge	California	3,500,000	(United States) Zach Johnson	46	Limited-field event
Dec 15	Franklin Templeton Shootout	Florida	3,100,000	(United States) Harris English and (United States) Matt Kuchar	n/a	Team event
Jun 24	CVS Caremark Charity Classic	Rhode Island	1,500,000	(United States) Steve Stricker and (United States) Bo Van Pelt	n/a	Team event
Sep 28	Ryder Cup	Scotland	n/a	Team Europe	n/a	Team event

== Location of tournaments ==
Location of official tournaments of the 2013–14 PGA Tour in the continental United States and Canada.
600-point event (Players & Majors)
550-point event (World Golf Championships)
500-point event (Regular events)
300-point event (Alternate events)
FedEx Cup playoff event
Location of official tournaments of the 2013–14 PGA Tour outside the continental United States and Canada.
600-point event (Players & Majors)
550-point event (World Golf Championships)
500-point event (Regular events)
300-point event (Alternate events)

== FedEx Cup ==
=== Final standings ===
For full rankings, see 2014 FedEx Cup Playoffs.

Final top 10 players in the FedEx Cup:

Position	Player	Points	Bonus money ($)
1	(United States) Billy Horschel	4,750	10,000,000
2	(United States) Chris Kirk	3,100	3,000,000
3	(Northern Ireland) Rory McIlroy	3,050	2,000,000
4	(United States) Jim Furyk	2,450	1,500,000
5	(United States) Bubba Watson	2,285	1,000,000
6	(United States) Hunter Mahan	1,835	800,000
7	(United States) Jimmy Walker	1,668	700,000
8	(United States) Matt Kuchar	1,300	600,000
9	(United States) Rickie Fowler	1,225	550,000
10	(Australia) Jason Day	1,200	500,000

== Money list ==
The money list was based on prize money won during the season, calculated in U.S. dollars.

Position	Player	Prize money ($)
1	(Northern Ireland) Rory McIlroy	8,280,096
2	(United States) Bubba Watson	6,336,978
3	(United States) Jim Furyk	5,987,395
4	(United States) Jimmy Walker	5,787,016
5	(Spain) Sergio García	4,939,606
6	(United States) Chris Kirk	4,854,777
7	(United States) Billy Horschel	4,814,787
8	(United States) Rickie Fowler	4,806,117
9	(United States) Matt Kuchar	4,695,515
10	(Germany) Martin Kaymer	4,532,537

== Awards ==
Award	Winner	Ref.
PGA Tour Player of the Year (Jack Nicklaus Trophy)	(Northern Ireland) Rory McIlroy	
PGA Player of the Year	(Northern Ireland) Rory McIlroy	
Rookie of the Year	(United States) Chesson Hadley	
Scoring leader (PGA Tour – Byron Nelson Award)	(Northern Ireland) Rory McIlroy	
Scoring leader (PGA – Vardon Trophy)	(Northern Ireland) Rory McIlroy	

== See also ==
- 2013 in golf
- 2014 in golf
- 2014 Champions Tour
- 2014 Web.com Tour
