= 2014 WGC-Bridgestone Invitational =

Coordinates: 41.008°N 81.508°W

Tournament information
- Dates: July 31 – August 3, 2014
- Location: Akron, Ohio, U.S.
- Course(s): Firestone Country Club; South Course
- Tour(s): PGA Tour; European Tour

Statistics
- Par: 70
- Length: 7,400 yards (6,767 m)
- Field: 76 players
- Cut: None
- Prize fund: $9,000,000 €6,703,418
- Winner's share: $1,530,000 €1,139,580

Champion
- (Northern Ireland) Rory McIlroy
- 265 (−15)

Location in the United States
Location in Ohio

The 2014 WGC-Bridgestone Invitational was a professional golf tournament held July 31 – August 3 on the South Course of Firestone Country Club in Akron, Ohio. It was the 16th WGC-Bridgestone Invitational tournament, and the third of the World Golf Championships events in 2014. Rory McIlroy won the tournament.

== Venue ==
=== Course layout ===
The South Course was designed by Bert Way and redesigned by Robert Trent Jones in 1960.

Hole	1	2	3	4	5	6	7	8	9	Out	10	11	12	13	14	15	16	17	18	In	Total
Yards	399	526	442	471	200	469	219	482	494	3702	410	418	180	471	467	221	667	400	464	3698	7400
Par	4	5	4	4	3	4	3	4	4	35	4	4	3	4	4	3	5	4	4	35	70

== Field ==
The field consists of players drawn primarily from the Official World Golf Ranking and the winners of the world-wide tournaments with the strongest fields.

1. Playing members of the 2013 United States and International Presidents Cup teams.

Keegan Bradley (2,3), Ángel Cabrera (4), Jason Day (2,3), Brendon de Jonge, Graham DeLaet (2,3), Jason Dufner (2,3,4), Ernie Els, Branden Grace, Bill Haas (2,3), Zach Johnson (2,3,4), Matt Kuchar (2,3,4), Marc Leishman, Hunter Mahan (2,3), Hideki Matsuyama (2,3), Phil Mickelson (2,3), Louis Oosthuizen (4), Charl Schwartzel (2,3), Adam Scott (2,3,4,5), Webb Simpson (2,3,4), Brandt Snedeker (2,3), Jordan Spieth (2,3), Richard Sterne, Steve Stricker (2,3), Tiger Woods (2,3)

2. The top 50 players from the Official World Golf Ranking as of July 21, 2014.

Thomas Bjørn (3,4), Jonas Blixt (3), Luke Donald (3,4), Jamie Donaldson (3), Victor Dubuisson (3,4), Harris English (3), Matt Every (3,4), Rickie Fowler (3), Jim Furyk (3), Stephen Gallacher (3,4), Sergio García (3,4,5), Mikko Ilonen (3,4), Thongchai Jaidee (3,4), Miguel Ángel Jiménez (3,4), Martin Kaymer (3,4), Chris Kirk (3,4), Joost Luiten (3), Graeme McDowell (3,4), Rory McIlroy (3,4), Francesco Molinari (3), Ryan Moore (3,4), Kevin Na (3), Ian Poulter (3), Patrick Reed (3,4), Justin Rose (3,4), Henrik Stenson (3,4), Kevin Streelman (3,4), Brendon Todd (3,4), Jimmy Walker (3,4), Bubba Watson (3,4), Lee Westwood (3,4), Gary Woodland (3)

Dustin Johnson (3,4) withdrew prior to the tournament

3. The top 50 players from the Official World Golf Ranking as of July 28, 2014.

4. Tournament winners, whose victories are considered official, of tournaments from the Federation Tours since the prior season's Bridgestone Invitational with an Official World Golf Ranking Strength of Field Rating of 115 points or more.

Steven Bowditch, Tim Clark, Ben Crane, Gonzalo Fernández-Castaño, Brian Harman, Russell Henley, J. B. Holmes, David Howell, Matt Jones, Pablo Larrazábal, Alexander Lévy, David Lynn, Noh Seung-yul, John Senden, Kevin Stadler, Scott Stallings, Fabrizio Zanotti

5. The winner of selected tournaments from each of the following tours:

- Asian Tour: Thailand Golf Championship (2013) – Sergio García (already qualified under categories 2 and 4)
- PGA Tour of Australasia: Australian PGA Championship (2013) – Adam Scott (already qualified under categories 1, 2 and 4)
- Japan Golf Tour: Bridgestone Open (2013) – Daisuke Maruyama
- Japan Golf Tour: Japan Golf Tour Championship – Yoshitaka Takeya
- Sunshine Tour: Dimension Data Pro-Am – Estanislao Goya

Nine players were appearing in their first WGC event: Steven Bowditch, Matt Every, Estanislao Goya, Brian Harman, Matt Jones, Alexander Lévy, Yoshitaka Takeya, Brendon Todd and Fabrizio Zanotti.

== Round summaries ==
=== First round ===
Thursday, July 31, 2014

Place	Player	Score	To par
1	(Australia) Marc Leishman	64	−6
T2	(United States) Ryan Moore	65	−5
T2	(England) Justin Rose	65	−5
T2	(South Africa) Charl Schwartzel	65	−5
T5	(Canada) Graham DeLaet	67	−3
T5	(United States) Rickie Fowler	67	−3
T5	(Italy) Francesco Molinari	67	−3
T5	(United States) Patrick Reed	67	−3
T9	(United States) Keegan Bradley	68	−2
T9	(Wales) Jamie Donaldson	68	−2
T9	(Spain) Sergio García	68	−2
T9	(United States) Brandt Snedeker	68	−2
T9	(United States) Tiger Woods	68	−2

=== Second round ===
Friday, August 1, 2014

Sergio García birdied his last seven holes, tying the course record of 61 (−9), which included a new course record of 27 (−8) on the back nine.

Place	Player	Score	To par
1	(Spain) Sergio García	68-61=129	−11
2	(England) Justin Rose	65-67=132	−8
T3	(Australia) Marc Leishman	64-69=133	−7
T3	(Northern Ireland) Rory McIlroy	69-64=133	−7
T5	(United States) Rickie Fowler	67-67=134	−6
T5	(South Africa) Charl Schwartzel	65-69=134	−6
T7	(United States) Keegan Bradley	68-67=135	−5
T7	(United States) Patrick Reed	67-68=135	−5
T9	(Canada) Graham DeLaet	67-69=136	−4
T9	(United States) Hunter Mahan	71-65=136	−4
T9	(United States) Brandt Snedeker	68-68=136	−4

=== Third round ===
Saturday, August 2, 2014

With threatening weather in the forecast, the field went off early in the morning from split tees in threesomes. A weather delay in the early afternoon affected the final several groups, but all rounds were finished.

Place	Player	Score	To par
1	(Spain) Sergio García	68-61-67=196	−14
2	(Northern Ireland) Rory McIlroy	69-64-66=199	−11
3	(Australia) Marc Leishman	64-69-68=201	−9
T4	(United States) Keegan Bradley	68-67-67=202	−8
T4	(England) Justin Rose	65-67-70=202	−8
T4	(Australia) Adam Scott	69-68-65=202	−8
7	(United States) Brandt Snedeker	68-68-68=204	−6
T8	(United States) J. B. Holmes	69-69-67=205	−5
T8	(Sweden) Henrik Stenson	71-66-68=205	−5
T10	(Denmark) Thomas Bjørn	69-68-69=206	−4
T10	(United States) Harris English	69-69-68=206	−4
T10	(United States) Rickie Fowler	67-67-72=206	−4
T10	(United States) Jim Furyk	69-68-69=206	−4
T10	(Japan) Hideki Matsuyama	70-71-65=206	−4
T10	(United States) Ryan Moore	65-73-68=206	−4
T10	(United States) Patrick Reed	67-68-71=206	−4
T10	(United States) Gary Woodland	70-68-68=206	−4

=== Final round ===
Sunday, August 3, 2014

The field went off the first tee in conventional pairs on Sunday, but a midday weather delay of over an hour was incurred before half the field teed off.

Place	Player	Score	To par	Money ($)
1	(Northern Ireland) Rory McIlroy	69-64-66-66=265	−15	1,530,000
2	(Spain) Sergio García	68-61-67-71=267	−13	900,000
3	(Australia) Marc Leishman	64-69-68-67=268	−12	522,000
T4	(United States) Keegan Bradley	68-67-67-69=271	−9	308,000
T4	(United States) Patrick Reed	67-68-71-65=271	−9	308,000
T4	(England) Justin Rose	65-67-70-69=271	−9	308,000
T4	(South Africa) Charl Schwartzel	65-69-73-64=271	−9	308,000
T8	(United States) Rickie Fowler	67-67-72-67=273	−7	170,000
T8	(Northern Ireland) Graeme McDowell	71-70-66-66=273	−7	170,000
T8	(United States) Ryan Moore	65-73-68-67=273	−7	170,000
T8	(Australia) Adam Scott	69-68-65-71=273	−7	170,000

==== Scorecard ====
Hole	1	2	3	4	5	6	7	8	9	10	11	12	13	14	15	16	17	18
Par	4	5	4	4	3	4	3	4	4	4	4	3	4	4	3	5	4	4
(Northern Ireland) McIlroy	−12	−13	−14	−14	−15	−15	−15	−14	−14	−14	−15	−15	−15	−15	−15	−15	−15	−15
(Spain) García	−14	−14	−13	−13	−13	−13	−13	−13	−14	−14	−14	−14	−14	−14	−13	−13	−13	−13
(Australia) Leishman	−9	−10	−11	−10	−10	−9	−10	−11	−11	−11	−11	−12	−12	−11	−11	−12	−12	−12
(United States) Bradley	−9	−9	−9	−10	−10	−10	−11	−11	−11	−11	−12	−11	−11	−10	−10	−9	−9	−9
(England) Rose	−8	−10	−10	−10	−9	−8	−9	−9	−9	−9	−9	−10	−10	−10	−9	−9	−9	−9
(Australia) Scott	−8	−9	−9	−9	−9	−9	−9	−9	−9	−10	−10	−10	−10	−9	−8	−7	−7	−7

Eagle	Birdie	Bogey
