= 2010 WGC-Accenture Match Play Championship =

Golf tournament

Coordinates: 32.471°N 111.105°W

Tournament information
- Dates: February 17–21, 2010
- Location: Marana, Arizona
- Courses: Ritz-Carlton Golf Club at Dove Mountain
- Tours: PGA Tour; European Tour
- Format: Match play – 18 holes (36-hole final)

Statistics
- Par: 72
- Length: 7,849 yards (7,177 m)
- Field: 64 players
- Prize fund: $8,500,000 €6,190,643
- Winner's share: $1,400,000 €1,019,635

Champion
- (England) Ian Poulter
- def. Paul Casey, 4 & 2

Location in the United States
Location in Arizona

The 2010 WGC-Accenture Match Play Championship was a golf tournament held February 17–21 at the Ritz-Carlton Golf Club at Dove Mountain in Marana, Arizona, northwest of Tucson. It was the 12th WGC-Accenture Match Play Championship and the first of four World Golf Championships held in 2010.

Ian Poulter won his first of two WGC victories with a 4 & 2 win over runner-up Paul Casey in the final match. This was the last year the final was played at 36 holes; it was reduced to 18 holes in 2011.

== Brackets ==
The championship was a single elimination match play event. The field consisted of the top 64 players available from the Official World Golf Rankings as of the February 7 ranking, seeded according to the rankings. Tiger Woods, world number 1, and Phil Mickelson, number 3, did not play. They were replaced by Chris Wood (ranked 65) and Ross McGowan (ranked 66).

=== Bobby Jones bracket ===
First round February 17
1	(United States) Steve Stricker
16	(England) Ross McGowan	19h
8	(Japan) Ryo Ishikawa	2up
9	(Australia) Michael Sim
5	(England) Ross Fisher
12	(Thailand) Thongchai Jaidee	5&4
4	(Sweden) Robert Karlsson	20h
13	(South Africa) Rory Sabbatini
6	(Argentina) Ángel Cabrera
11	(Australia) Adam Scott	3&2
3	(England) Ian Poulter	19h
14	(United States) Justin Leonard
7	(United States) Anthony Kim
10	(United States) Matt Kuchar	3&2
2	(Republic of Ireland) Pádraig Harrington
15	(India) Jeev Milkha Singh	3&1

Second round February 18
16	(England) Ross McGowan
8	(Japan) Ryo Ishikawa	2up
12	(Thailand) Thongchai Jaidee	4&3
4	(Sweden) Robert Karlsson
11	(Australia) Adam Scott
3	(England) Ian Poulter	2&1
10	(United States) Matt Kuchar
15	(India) Jeev Milkha Singh	1up

Third round February 19
8	(Japan) Ryo Ishikawa
12	(Thailand) Thongchai Jaidee	5&4
3	(England) Ian Poulter	5&4
15	(India) Jeev Milkha Singh

Fourth round February 20
12	(Thailand) Thongchai Jaidee
3	(England) Ian Poulter	1up

=== Ben Hogan bracket ===
First round February 17
1	(Germany) Martin Kaymer	4&2
16	(United States) Chad Campbell
8	(Fiji) Vijay Singh
9	(South Africa) Tim Clark	1up
5	(United States) Lucas Glover
12	(Denmark) Anders Hansen	2&1
4	(Spain) Sergio García	2up
13	(United States) David Toms
6	(England) Luke Donald	2&1
11	(Northern Ireland) Graeme McDowell
3	(Australia) Robert Allenby	4&2
14	(Sweden) Peter Hanson
7	(Spain) Miguel Á. Jiménez
10	(England) Oliver Wilson	3&2
2	(Northern Ireland) Rory McIlroy	1up
15	(United States) Kevin Na

Second round February 18
1	(Germany) Martin Kaymer
9	(South Africa) Tim Clark	3&2
12	(Denmark) Anders Hansen
4	(Spain) Sergio García	2&1
6	(England) Luke Donald	6&5
3	(Australia) Robert Allenby
10	(England) Oliver Wilson	20h
2	(Northern Ireland) Rory McIlroy

Third round February 19
9	(South Africa) Tim Clark
4	(Spain) Sergio García	2&1
6	(England) Luke Donald
10	(England) Oliver Wilson	20h

Fourth round February 20
4	(Spain) Sergio García	4&3
10	(England) Oliver Wilson

=== Gary Player bracket ===
First round February 17
1	(England) Lee Westwood	3&1
16	(England) Chris Wood
8	(United States) Nick Watney	4&3
9	(Japan) Yuta Ikeda
5	(South Africa) Retief Goosen	3&2
12	(Denmark) Søren Hansen
4	(South Africa) Ernie Els	4&3
13	(United States) Ryan Moore
6	(Colombia) Camilo Villegas	4&3
11	(United States) Dustin Johnson
3	(Australia) Geoff Ogilvy	7&5
14	(Sweden) Alex Norén
7	(South Korea) Yang Yong-eun	2&1
10	(Denmark) Søren Kjeldsen
2	(Sweden) Henrik Stenson
15	(United States) Ben Crane	Con.

Second round February 18
1	(England) Lee Westwood
8	(United States) Nick Watney	2&1
5	(South Africa) Retief Goosen	20h
4	(South Africa) Ernie Els
6	(Colombia) Camilo Villegas	2&1
3	(Australia) Geoff Ogilvy
7	(South Korea) Yang Yong-eun
15	(United States) Ben Crane	3&2

Third round February 19
8	(United States) Nick Watney
5	(South Africa) Retief Goosen	1up
6	(Colombia) Camilo Villegas	3&2
15	(United States) Ben Crane

Fourth round February 20
5	(South Africa) Retief Goosen
6	(Colombia) Camilo Villegas	4&3

=== Sam Snead bracket ===
First round February 17
1	(United States) Jim Furyk	2&1
16	(United States) Scott Verplank
8	(United States) Hunter Mahan
9	(South Africa) Charl Schwartzel	2&1
5	(United States) Stewart Cink	2up
12	(Italy) Edoardo Molinari
4	(United States) Sean O'Hair	3&1
13	(England) Simon Dyson
6	(United States) Zach Johnson	21h
11	(Italy) Francesco Molinari
3	(United States) Kenny Perry
14	(United States) Brian Gay	2&1
7	(Spain) Álvaro Quirós
10	(Canada) Mike Weir	8&6
2	(England) Paul Casey	5&4
15	(Canada) Stephen Ames

Second round February 18
1	(United States) Jim Furyk
9	(South Africa) Charl Schwartzel	3&2
5	(United States) Stewart Cink	1up
4	(United States) Sean O'Hair
6	(United States) Zach Johnson
14	(United States) Brian Gay	2up
10	(Canada) Mike Weir
2	(England) Paul Casey	5&4

Third round February 19
9	(South Africa) Charl Schwartzel
5	(United States) Stewart Cink	19h
14	(United States) Brian Gay
2	(England) Paul Casey	5&4

Fourth round February 20
5	(United States) Stewart Cink
2	(England) Paul Casey	5&4

=== Final Four ===
Semi-finals; February 20
3	(England) Ian Poulter	7&6
4	(Spain) Sergio García
6	(Colombia) Camilo Villegas
2	(England) Paul Casey	24h

Finals; February 21
3	(England) Ian Poulter	4&2
2	(England) Paul Casey
Third place
4	(Spain) Sergio García
6	(Colombia) Camilo Villegas	5&4

== Prize money breakdown ==
Place	US ($)
Champion	1,400,000
Runner-up	850,000
Third place	600,000
Fourth place	490,000
Losing quarter-finalists x 4	270,000
Losing third round x 8	140,000
Losing second round x 16	95,000
Losing first round x 32	45,000
Total	$8,500,000
