= 2009 WGC-Accenture Match Play Championship =

Coordinates: 32.471°N 111.105°W

Tournament information
- Dates: February 25 – March 1, 2009
- Location: Marana, Arizona
- Courses: Ritz-Carlton Golf Club at Dove Mountain
- Tours: PGA Tour; European Tour

Statistics
- Par: 72
- Length: 7,833 yards (7,162 m)
- Field: 64 players
- Prize fund: $8,500,000
- Winner's share: $1,400,000

Champion
- (Australia) Geoff Ogilvy
- def. Paul Casey 4 & 3

Location in the United States
Location in Arizona

The 2009 WGC-Accenture Match Play Championship was a golf tournament that was played from February 25 to March 1, 2009, at the Ritz-Carlton Golf Club at Dove Mountain in Marana, Arizona. It was the eleventh WGC-Accenture Match Play Championship and the first of four World Golf Championships held in 2009.

The tournament marked the return of Tiger Woods to the PGA Tour, following eight months out of the sport after undergoing knee surgery shortly after his victory in the 2008 U.S. Open.

Geoff Ogilvy continued his success at the WGC-Accenture Match Play Championship defeating Paul Casey, who had not trailed in any of his first five matches, 4 and 3 in the final. It was Ogilvy's second win in the event, in which reached the final for the third time in four years. The victory also improved his already impressive match record in the event to 17 wins and 2 losses.

== Brackets ==
The Championship was a single elimination match play event. The field consisted of the top 64 players available from the Official World Golf Rankings as of the February 16 ranking, seeded according to the rankings. All of the top 64 players in the February 16 ranking participated in the event, the first time in the tournament's history that had happened.

=== Bobby Jones bracket ===
First round February 25
1	(United States) Tiger Woods	3&2
16	(Australia) Brendan Jones
8	(South Africa) Tim Clark	3&2
9	(South Africa) Retief Goosen
5	(Canada) Mike Weir
12	(United States) Hunter Mahan	1up
4	(Northern Ireland) Rory McIlroy	2&1
13	(South Africa) Louis Oosthuizen
6	(Spain) Miguel Á. Jiménez	2&1
11	(South Africa) Rory Sabbatini
3	(Colombia) Camilo Villegas	7&6
14	(Australia) Rod Pampling
7	(South Africa) Trevor Immelman
10	(Japan) Shingo Katayama	3&2
2	(Australia) Geoff Ogilvy	19h
15	(United States) Kevin Sutherland

Second round February 26
1	(United States) Tiger Woods
8	(South Africa) Tim Clark	4&2
12	(United States) Hunter Mahan
4	(Northern Ireland) Rory McIlroy	1up
6	(Spain) Miguel Á. Jiménez
3	(Colombia) Camilo Villegas	5&4
10	(Japan) Shingo Katayama
2	(Australia) Geoff Ogilvy	19h

Third round February 27
8	(South Africa) Tim Clark
4	(Northern Ireland) Rory McIlroy	4&3
3	(Colombia) Camilo Villegas
2	(Australia) Geoff Ogilvy	2&1

Fourth round February 28
4	(Northern Ireland) Rory McIlroy
2	(Australia) Geoff Ogilvy	2&1

=== Ben Hogan bracket ===
First round February 25
1	(Fiji) Vijay Singh	2&1
16	(Denmark) Søren Kjeldsen
8	(United States) Ben Curtis
9	(England) Luke Donald	19h
5	(United States) Steve Stricker	2&1
12	(United States) Dustin Johnson
4	(South Africa) Ernie Els	4&2
13	(Denmark) Søren Hansen
6	(United States) Stewart Cink	19h
11	(South Africa) Richard Sterne
3	(England) Lee Westwood	2&1
14	(Thailand) Prayad Marksaeng
7	(United States) Zach Johnson	3&1
10	(Northern Ireland) Graeme McDowell
2	(United States) Phil Mickelson	19h
15	(Argentina) Ángel Cabrera

Second round February 26
1	(Fiji) Vijay Singh
9	(England) Luke Donald	19h
5	(United States) Steve Stricker
4	(South Africa) Ernie Els	3&2
6	(United States) Stewart Cink	23h
3	(England) Lee Westwood
7	(United States) Zach Johnson
2	(United States) Phil Mickelson	1up

Third round February 27
9	(England) Luke Donald
4	(South Africa) Ernie Els	2up
6	(United States) Stewart Cink	1up
2	(United States) Phil Mickelson

Fourth round February 28
4	(South Africa) Ernie Els
6	(United States) Stewart Cink	2&1

=== Gary Player bracket ===
First round February 25
1	(Spain) Sergio García
16	(South Africa) Charl Schwartzel	1up
8	(England) Ian Poulter	4&3
9	(India) Jeev Milkha Singh
5	(Australia) Adam Scott
12	(United States) Sean O'Hair	1up
4	(England) Justin Rose
13	(United States) Boo Weekley	1up
6	(England) Paul Casey	1up
11	(Australia) Aaron Baddeley
3	(United States) Kenny Perry
14	(Australia) Mathew Goggin	2&1
7	(Spain) Álvaro Quirós
10	(Canada) Stephen Ames	1up
2	(Sweden) Robert Karlsson
15	(Sweden) Peter Hanson	3&2

Second round February 26
16	(South Africa) Charl Schwartzel
8	(England) Ian Poulter	1up
12	(United States) Sean O'Hair	2&1
13	(United States) Boo Weekley
6	(England) Paul Casey	6&4
14	(Australia) Mathew Goggin
10	(Canada) Stephen Ames
15	(Sweden) Peter Hanson	2&1

Third round February 27
8	(England) Ian Poulter
12	(United States) Sean O'Hair	2&1
6	(England) Paul Casey	3&2
15	(Sweden) Peter Hanson

Fourth round February 28
12	(United States) Sean O'Hair
6	(England) Paul Casey	4&3

=== Sam Snead bracket ===
First round February 25
1	(Republic of Ireland) Pádraig Harrington
16	(United States) Pat Perez	1up
8	(Australia) Robert Allenby
9	(England) Ross Fisher	1up
5	(Germany) Martin Kaymer	1up
12	(Australia) Stuart Appleby
4	(United States) Jim Furyk	2&1
13	(Denmark) Anders Hansen
6	(South Korea) K. J. Choi
11	(England) Oliver Wilson	3&1
3	(United States) Anthony Kim	7&5
14	(Taiwan) Lin Wen-tang
7	(United States) Justin Leonard	2&1
10	(Argentina) Andrés Romero
2	(Sweden) Henrik Stenson
15	(United States) Davis Love III	21h

Second round February 26
16	(United States) Pat Perez
9	(England) Ross Fisher	6&5
5	(Germany) Martin Kaymer
4	(United States) Jim Furyk	4&2
11	(England) Oliver Wilson	2&1
3	(United States) Anthony Kim
7	(United States) Justin Leonard	1up
15	(United States) Davis Love III

Third round February 27
9	(England) Ross Fisher	4&3
4	(United States) Jim Furyk
11	(England) Oliver Wilson
7	(United States) Justin Leonard	19h

Fourth round February 28
9	(England) Ross Fisher	2&1
7	(United States) Justin Leonard

=== Final Four ===
Semi-finals; February 28
2	(Australia) Geoff Ogilvy	4&2
6	(United States) Stewart Cink
6	(England) Paul Casey	4&3
9	(England) Ross Fisher

Finals; March 1
2	(Australia) Geoff Ogilvy	4&3
6	(England) Paul Casey
Third place
6	(United States) Stewart Cink	1up
9	(England) Ross Fisher

== Prize money breakdown ==
Place	US ($)
Champion	1,400,000
Runner-up	850,000
Third place	600,000
Fourth place	490,000
Losing quarter-finalists x 4	270,000
Losing third round x 8	140,000
Losing second round x 16	95,000
Losing first round x 32	45,000
Total	$8,500,000
