= 2012 WGC-Accenture Match Play Championship =

Coordinates: 32.471°N 111.105°W

Tournament information
- Dates: February 22–26, 2012
- Location: Marana, Arizona
- Course(s): Ritz-Carlton Golf Club at Dove Mountain (Saguaro, Tortolita nines)
- Tour(s): PGA Tour; European Tour
- Format: Match play – 18 holes

Statistics
- Par: 72
- Length: 7,849 yards (7,177 m)
- Field: 64 players
- Prize fund: $8,500,000 €6,440,370
- Winner's share: $1,400,000 €1,060,767

Champion
- (United States) Hunter Mahan
- def. Rory McIlroy, 2&1

Location in the United States
Location in Arizona

The 2012 WGC-Accenture Match Play Championship was a golf tournament played February 22–26 at the Ritz-Carlton Golf Club at Dove Mountain in Marana, Arizona, northwest of Tucson. It was the 14th WGC-Accenture Match Play Championship and the first of four World Golf Championships held in 2012.

Hunter Mahan won his first Match Play title and second WGC with a 2&1 victory over runner-up Rory McIlroy. Defending champion Luke Donald lost in the first round, as did three other previous winners.

== Format change ==
For 2012, the players were seeded based on the last Official World Golf Ranking prior to the tournament, instead of the previous weeks ranking that determined the field.

== 2012 course layout ==
Course	Saguaro										Tortolita										
Hole	1	2	3	4	5	6	7	8	9	Out	10	11	12	13	14	15	16	17	18	In	Total
Yards	460	574	208	393	536	185	486	576	476	3,894	493	659	219	583	449	343	247	482	480	3,955	7,849
Par	4	5	3	4	4	3	4	5	4	36	4	5	3	5	4	4	3	4	4	36	72

- The average elevation of the course was approximately 2,600 feet (790 m) above sea level.
- The championship utilized the Saguaro and Tortolita nines; the course rating was 77.1 and the slope was 147.
- The only yardage change from 2011 was the lengthening of the 11th hole, from 601 to 659 yards.

== Brackets ==
The championship was a single elimination match play event. The field consisted of the top 64 players available from the Official World Golf Ranking as of the February 12 ranking, seeded according to the February 19 rankings.

Two players ranked in the top 64 did not play in the event. Phil Mickelson (ranked #11) did not play due to a planned family vacation and was replaced by Ernie Els (#65). Paul Casey (#23) did not play due to a shoulder injury and was replaced by George Coetzee (#66). In the first round, Els handily defeated defending champion Luke Donald 5&4 and Coetzee took Rory McIlroy to 18th hole, but fell at 2 down.

=== Bobby Jones bracket ===
First round February 22
1	(England) Luke Donald
16	(South Africa) Ernie Els	5&4
8	(United States) Jason Dufner
9	(Sweden) Peter Hanson	2&1
5	(United States) Brandt Snedeker	21h
12	(South Africa) Retief Goosen
4	(South Korea) K. J. Choi
13	(United States) Kyle Stanley	2&1
6	(Denmark) Thomas Bjørn
11	(Italy) Francesco Molinari	20h
3	(United States) Dustin Johnson	20h
14	(United States) Jim Furyk
7	(United States) Bo Van Pelt
10	(United States) Mark Wilson	3&2
2	(Australia) Adam Scott
15	(England) Robert Rock	1up

Second round February 23
16	(South Africa) Ernie Els
9	(Sweden) Peter Hanson	5&4
5	(United States) Brandt Snedeker	2&1
13	(United States) Kyle Stanley
11	(Italy) Francesco Molinari
3	(United States) Dustin Johnson	7&5
10	(United States) Mark Wilson	3&2
15	(England) Robert Rock

Third round February 24
9	(Sweden) Peter Hanson	5&3
5	(United States) Brandt Snedeker
3	(United States) Dustin Johnson
10	(United States) Mark Wilson	4&3

Fourth round February 25
9	(Sweden) Peter Hanson
10	(United States) Mark Wilson	4&3

=== Ben Hogan bracket ===
First round February 22
1	(Germany) Martin Kaymer	4&2
16	(Australia) Greg Chalmers
8	(United States) David Toms	1up
9	(United States) Rickie Fowler
5	(United States) Bubba Watson	3&2
12	(United States) Ben Crane
4	(United States) Matt Kuchar	1up
13	(United States) Jonathan Byrd
6	(United States) Hunter Mahan	19h
11	(United States) Zach Johnson
3	(Northern Ireland) Graeme McDowell
14	(South Korea) Yang Yong-eun	2&1
7	(South Africa) Louis Oosthuizen	2&1
10	(Australia) Aaron Baddeley
2	(United States) Steve Stricker	2&1
15	(United States) Kevin Na

Second round February 23
1	(Germany) Martin Kaymer	2up
8	(United States) David Toms
5	(United States) Bubba Watson
4	(United States) Matt Kuchar	3&2
6	(United States) Hunter Mahan	5&3
14	(South Korea) Yang Yong-eun
7	(South Africa) Louis Oosthuizen
2	(United States) Steve Stricker	1up

Third round February 24
1	(Germany) Martin Kaymer
4	(United States) Matt Kuchar	4&3
6	(United States) Hunter Mahan	4&3
2	(United States) Steve Stricker

Fourth round February 25
4	(United States) Matt Kuchar
6	(United States) Hunter Mahan	6&5

=== Gary Player bracket ===
First round February 22
1	(Northern Ireland) Rory McIlroy	2up
16	(South Africa) George Coetzee
8	(South Korea) Kim Kyung-tae
9	(Denmark) Anders Hansen	5&3
5	(United States) Keegan Bradley	4&3
12	(Australia) Geoff Ogilvy
4	(Spain) Sergio García
13	(Spain) Miguel Á. Jiménez	2&1
6	(England) Ian Poulter
11	(South Korea) Bae Sang-moon	4&3
3	(South Africa) Charl Schwartzel	4&2
14	(United States) Gary Woodland
7	(England) Simon Dyson
10	(Australia) John Senden	4&3
2	(Australia) Jason Day	19h
15	(Spain) Rafa Cabrera-Bello

Second round February 23
1	(Northern Ireland) Rory McIlroy	3&2
9	(Denmark) Anders Hansen
5	(United States) Keegan Bradley
13	(Spain) Miguel Á. Jiménez	2&1
11	(South Korea) Bae Sang-moon	1up
3	(South Africa) Charl Schwartzel
10	(Australia) John Senden	6&5
2	(Australia) Jason Day

Third round February 24
1	(Northern Ireland) Rory McIlroy	3&1
13	(Spain) Miguel Á. Jiménez
11	(South Korea) Bae Sang-moon	1up
10	(Australia) John Senden

Fourth round February 25
1	(Northern Ireland) Rory McIlroy	3&2
11	(South Korea) Bae Sang-moon

=== Sam Snead bracket ===
First round February 22
1	(England) Lee Westwood	3&1
16	(Belgium) Nicolas Colsaerts
8	(Sweden) Robert Karlsson	6&5
9	(Sweden) Freddie Jacobson
5	(United States) Tiger Woods	1up
12	(Spain) G. F'dez-Castaño
4	(United States) Nick Watney	5&4
13	(Northern Ireland) Darren Clarke
6	(England) Justin Rose
11	(Scotland) Paul Lawrie	1up
3	(United States) Bill Haas
14	(Japan) Ryo Ishikawa	1up
7	(Spain) Álvaro Quirós
10	(Scotland) Martin Laird	1up
2	(United States) Webb Simpson
15	(Italy) Matteo Manassero	3&2

Second round February 23
1	(England) Lee Westwood	3&2
8	(Sweden) Robert Karlsson
5	(United States) Tiger Woods
4	(United States) Nick Watney	1up
11	(Scotland) Paul Lawrie	1up
14	(Japan) Ryo Ishikawa
10	(Scotland) Martin Laird	2&1
15	(Italy) Matteo Manassero

Third round February 24
1	(England) Lee Westwood	3&2
4	(United States) Nick Watney
11	(Scotland) Paul Lawrie
10	(Scotland) Martin Laird	3&1

Fourth round February 25
1	(England) Lee Westwood	4&2
10	(Scotland) Martin Laird

=== Final Four ===
Semi-finals; February 26
10	(United States) Mark Wilson
6	(United States) Hunter Mahan	2&1
1	(Northern Ireland) Rory McIlroy	3&1
1	(England) Lee Westwood

Finals; February 26
6	(United States) Hunter Mahan	2&1
1	(Northern Ireland) Rory McIlroy
Third place
10	(United States) Mark Wilson	1up
1	(England) Lee Westwood

== Prize money breakdown ==
Place	US ($)
Champion	1,400,000
Runner-up	850,000
Third place	600,000
Fourth place	490,000
Losing quarter-finalists x 4	270,000
Losing third round x 8	140,000
Losing second round x 16	95,000
Losing first round x 32	45,000
Total	$8,500,000
