= 2014 WGC-Accenture Match Play Championship =

Coordinates: 32.471°N 111.105°W

Tournament information
- Dates: February 19–23, 2014
- Location: Marana, Arizona, U.S.
- Course(s): The Golf Club at Dove Mountain (Saguaro, Tortolita nines)
- Tour(s): PGA Tour; European Tour
- Format: Match play – 18 holes

Statistics
- Par: 72
- Length: 7,791 yards (7,124 m)
- Field: 64 players
- Prize fund: $9,000,000 €6,562,158
- Winner's share: $1,530,000 €1,115,567

Champion
- (Australia) Jason Day
- def. Victor Dubuisson, 23 holes

Location in the United States
Location in Arizona

The 2014 WGC-Accenture Match Play Championship was the 16th WGC-Accenture Match Play Championship, held February 19–23 at The Golf Club at Dove Mountain in Marana, Arizona, northwest of Tucson. It was the first of four World Golf Championships in 2014. With a field of 64 competitors, the five-day six-round event began on Wednesday, with the semifinals and finals on Sunday. Jason Day won his first WGC title at the 23rd hole of the final match with Victor Dubuisson.

This was the eighth and final edition of the championship contested in Marana, the host since 2007. The tournament moved back to California in 2015, held in early May at TPC Harding Park in San Francisco, and went to Austin, Texas, in March 2016.

This was also the final edition in which the entire tournament was single-elimination, as the first two rounds were replaced by round-robin play in 2015, with sixteen players advancing to the knock-out bracket on the weekend.

== Course ==
Course	Saguaro										Tortolita										
Hole	1	2	3	4	5	6	7	8	9	Out	10	11	12	13	14	15	16	17	18	In	Total
Yards	460	574	208	393	536	185	486	576	476	3,894	493	601	219	583	449	343	247	482	480	3,897	7,791
Par	4	5	3	4	4	3	4	5	4	36	4	5	3	5	4	4	3	4	4	36	72

- The average elevation of the course was approximately 2,600 feet (790 m) above sea level.
- The only yardage change from 2012 was the shortening of the 11th hole from 659 to 601 yards, as it had been in 2011.

== Brackets ==
The Championship is a single elimination match play event. The field consists of the top 64 players available from the Official World Golf Ranking on February 9, 2014. seeded according to the February 16 rankings.

Three of the top four ranked players, Tiger Woods (ranked #1), Adam Scott (2), and Phil Mickelson (4) chose not to enter and were replaced by Richard Sterne (65), Scott Piercy (66), and Kiradech Aphibarnrat (67).

Three players were appearing in their first WGC event: Victor Dubuisson, Chris Kirk and Patrick Reed.

=== Bobby Jones bracket ===
First round February 19
1	(Sweden) Henrik Stenson	2&1
16	(Thailand) Kiradech Aphibarnrat
8	(South Africa) Louis Oosthuizen	1up
9	(United States) Nick Watney
5	(United States) Webb Simpson	3&2
12	(Thailand) Thongchai Jaidee
4	(United States) Brandt Snedeker	20h
13	(England) David Lynn
6	(Canada) Graham DeLaet
11	(United States) Patrick Reed	1up
3	(United States) Steve Stricker
14	(South Africa) George Coetzee	3&1
7	(Wales) Jamie Donaldson
10	(United States) Billy Horschel	6&5
2	(Australia) Jason Day	2up
15	(Denmark) Thorbjørn Olesen

Second round February 20
1	(Sweden) Henrik Stenson
8	(South Africa) Louis Oosthuizen	4&3
5	(United States) Webb Simpson	4&3
4	(United States) Brandt Snedeker
11	(United States) Patrick Reed
14	(South Africa) George Coetzee	21h
10	(United States) Billy Horschel
2	(Australia) Jason Day	22h

Third round February 21
8	(South Africa) Louis Oosthuizen	5&4
5	(United States) Webb Simpson
14	(South Africa) George Coetzee
2	(Australia) Jason Day	3&1

Fourth round February 22
8	(South Africa) Louis Oosthuizen
2	(Australia) Jason Day	2&1

=== Ben Hogan bracket ===
First round February 19
1	(Northern Ireland) Rory McIlroy	3&2
16	(United States) Boo Weekley
8	(England) Lee Westwood
9	(United States) Harris English	5&3
5	(United States) Jim Furyk	2&1
12	(United States) Chris Kirk
4	(South Africa) Charl Schwartzel	3&2
13	(United States) Kevin Stadler
6	(United States) Jimmy Walker	5&4
11	(South Africa) Branden Grace
3	(England) Ian Poulter
14	(United States) Rickie Fowler	2&1
7	(United States) Bill Haas	4&3
10	(Spain) Miguel Á. Jiménez
2	(Spain) Sergio García	22h
15	(Australia) Marc Leishman

Second round February 20
1	(Northern Ireland) Rory McIlroy
9	(United States) Harris English	19h
5	(United States) Jim Furyk	3&2
4	(South Africa) Charl Schwartzel
6	(United States) Jimmy Walker
14	(United States) Rickie Fowler	1up
7	(United States) Bill Haas
2	(Spain) Sergio García	3&1

Third round February 21
9	(United States) Harris English
5	(United States) Jim Furyk	1up
14	(United States) Rickie Fowler	1up
2	(Spain) Sergio Garcia

Fourth round February 22
5	(United States) Jim Furyk
14	(United States) Rickie Fowler	1up

=== Gary Player bracket ===
First round February 19
1	(England) Justin Rose	1up
16	(United States) Scott Piercy
8	(South Africa) Ernie Els	19h
9	(Scotland) Stephen Gallacher
5	(England) Luke Donald
12	(Italy) Matteo Manassero	5&4
4	(United States) Jason Dufner	19h
13	(United States) Scott Stallings
6	(Denmark) Thomas Bjørn	2&1
11	(Italy) Francesco Molinari
3	(United States) Jordan Spieth	2up
14	(Spain) Pablo Larrazábal
7	(United States) Ryan Moore	1up
10	(Netherlands) Joost Luiten
2	(United States) Matt Kuchar	3&2
15	(Austria) Bernd Wiesberger

Second round February 20
1	(England) Justin Rose
8	(South Africa) Ernie Els	20h
12	(Italy) Matteo Manassero
4	(United States) Jason Dufner	2&1
6	(Denmark) Thomas Bjørn
3	(United States) Jordan Spieth	5&4
7	(United States) Ryan Moore
2	(United States) Matt Kuchar	2up

Third round February 21
8	(South Africa) Ernie Els	1up
4	(United States) Jason Dufner
3	(United States) Jordan Spieth	2&1
2	(United States) Matt Kuchar

Fourth round February 22
8	(South Africa) Ernie Els	4&2
3	(United States) Jordan Spieth

=== Sam Snead bracket ===
First round February 19
1	(United States) Zach Johnson
16	(South Africa) Richard Sterne	5&4
8	(United States) Hunter Mahan	3&2
9	(Spain) Gonzalo F-Castaño
5	(Japan) Hideki Matsuyama	2&1
12	(Germany) Martin Kaymer
4	(Northern Ireland) Graeme McDowell	19h
13	(United States) Gary Woodland
6	(United States) Keegan Bradley
11	(Sweden) Jonas Blixt	2&1
3	(United States) Bubba Watson	2&1
14	(Finland) Mikko Ilonen
7	(France) Victor Dubuisson	5&4
10	(United States) Kevin Streelman
2	(United States) Dustin Johnson
15	(Sweden) Peter Hanson	4&3

Second round February 20
16	(South Africa) Richard Sterne
8	(United States) Hunter Mahan	2up
5	(Japan) Hideki Matsuyama
4	(Northern Ireland) Graeme McDowell	1up
11	(Sweden) Jonas Blixt
3	(United States) Bubba Watson	2up
7	(France) Victor Dubuisson	3&1
15	(Sweden) Peter Hanson

Third round February 21
8	(United States) Hunter Mahan
4	(Northern Ireland) Graeme McDowell	1up
3	(United States) Bubba Watson
7	(France) Victor Dubuisson	1up

Fourth round February 22
4	(Northern Ireland) Graeme McDowell
7	(France) Victor Dubuisson	1up

=== Final Four ===
Semi-finals; February 23
2	(Australia) Jason Day	3&2
14	(United States) Rickie Fowler
8	(South Africa) Ernie Els
7	(France) Victor Dubuisson	1up

Finals; February 23
2	(Australia) Jason Day	23h
7	(France) Victor Dubuisson
Third place
14	(United States) Rickie Fowler	19h
8	(South Africa) Ernie Els

==== Scorecard ====
Final match

Hole	1	2	3	4	5	6	7	8	9	10	11	12	13	14	15	16	17	18
Par	4	5	3	4	4	3	4	5	4	4	5	3	5	4	4	3	4	4
Match	1up	2up	1up	A/S	A/S	1up	2up	2up	3up	3up	3up	3up	2up	2up	2up	2up	1up	A/S
(Australia) Day	3	4	3	5	5	3	3	4	C	4	4	3	5	4	3	3	4	5
(France) Dubuisson	5	6	2	4	5	4	5	4		4	4	3	4	4	3	3	3	4

Hole	19	20	21	22	23
Par	4	4	4	4	4
Match	A/S	A/S	A/S	A/S	1up
(Australia) Day	4	4	5	4	3
(France) Dubuisson	4	4	5	4	4

== Prize money breakdown ==
Place	US ($)
Champion	1,530,000
Runner-up	906,000
Third place	630,000
Fourth place	510,000
Losing quarter-finalists x 4	280,000
Losing third round x 8	148,000
Losing second round x 16	99,000
Losing first round x 32	48,000
Total	9,000,000
