= 2013 WGC-Accenture Match Play Championship =

Coordinates: 32.471°N 111.105°W

Tournament information
- Dates: February 20–24, 2013
- Location: Marana, Arizona, U.S.
- Course(s): The Golf Club at Dove Mountain (Saguaro, Tortolita nines)
- Tour(s): PGA Tour; European Tour
- Format: Match play – 18 holes

Statistics
- Par: 72
- Length: 7,791 yards (7,124 m)
- Field: 64 players
- Prize fund: $8,750,000 €6,502,047
- Winner's share: $1,500,000 €1,114,637

Champion
- (United States) Matt Kuchar
- def. Hunter Mahan, 2&1

Location in the United States
Location in Arizona

The 2013 WGC-Accenture Match Play Championship was the 15th WGC-Accenture Match Play Championship, played February 20–24 at The Golf Club at Dove Mountain in Marana, Arizona, northwest of Tucson.

Matt Kuchar won his first WGC event, 2&1 over runner-up Hunter Mahan, the defending champion. This was the first of four World Golf Championships in 2013. Weather delays due to snow disrupted the schedule.

== Course ==
Course	Saguaro										Tortolita										
Hole	1	2	3	4	5	6	7	8	9	Out	10	11	12	13	14	15	16	17	18	In	Total
Yards	460	574	208	393	536	185	486	576	476	3,894	493	601	219	583	449	343	247	482	480	3,897	7,791
Par	4	5	3	4	4	3	4	5	4	36	4	5	3	5	4	4	3	4	4	36	72

- The average elevation of the course was approximately 2,600 feet (790 m) above sea level.
- The only yardage change from 2012 was the shortening of the 11th hole from 659 to 601 yards, as it had been in 2011.

== Brackets ==
The championship is a single elimination match play event. The field consists of the top 64 players available from the Official World Golf Ranking as of the February 10 ranking, seeded according to the February 17 rankings.

Phil Mickelson (ranked 10 as of February 10) chose not to enter and was replaced by Shane Lowry (ranked 65 as of February 10). Brandt Snedeker (ranked 4) withdrew with a rib injury and was replaced by Freddie Jacobson (ranked 66 as of February 10). As of February 17, Lowry became the bottom seed (ranked 68).

Russell Henley was the only player competing in his first WGC event.

=== Weather delay ===
Snow forced the cancellation of play on Wednesday afternoon. None of the first round matches were completed and ten of the matches had not yet started when play was halted. Almost two inches of snow covered the course, practice putting green and the driving range.

Overnight snow caused another delay on Thursday and play did not resume until 1pm local time. At the close of play, 2 of the 32 first round matches were still not completed: Carl Pettersson was 1up on Rickie Fowler after 17 holes while Gonzalo Fernández-Castaño and Francesco Molinari were all square after 15 holes. The revised schedule involves completing the second round on Friday with the third and fourth rounds on Saturday.

=== Bobby Jones bracket ===
Shane Lowry became the first 64th seed to reach the third round in the 15-year history of the championship. The three previous 64th seeds to defeat the number 1 seed have all lost in the second round.

First round February 20–22
1	(Northern Ireland) Rory McIlroy
16	(Republic of Ireland) Shane Lowry	1up
8	(United States) Rickie Fowler
9	(Sweden) Carl Pettersson	19h
5	(Northern Ireland) Graeme McDowell	2up
12	(Republic of Ireland) Pádraig Harrington
4	(United States) Dustin Johnson
13	(Sweden) Alex Norén	6&4
6	(United States) Zach Johnson
11	(Australia) Jason Day	6&5
3	(South Africa) Charl Schwartzel
14	(United States) Russell Henley	1up
7	(United States) Jim Furyk	4&2
10	(United States) Ryan Moore
2	(United States) Bubba Watson	2&1
15	(England) Chris Wood

Second round February 22
16	(Republic of Ireland) Shane Lowry	6&5
9	(Sweden) Carl Pettersson
5	(Northern Ireland) Graeme McDowell	20h
13	(Sweden) Alex Norén
11	(Australia) Jason Day	19h
14	(United States) Russell Henley
7	(United States) Jim Furyk
2	(United States) Bubba Watson	22h

Third round February 23
16	(Republic of Ireland) Shane Lowry
5	(Northern Ireland) Graeme McDowell	3&2
11	(Australia) Jason Day	4&3
2	(United States) Bubba Watson

Fourth round February 23
5	(Northern Ireland) Graeme McDowell
11	(Australia) Jason Day	1up

=== Ben Hogan bracket ===
First round February 20–21
1	(South Africa) Louis Oosthuizen	2&1
16	(Scotland) Richie Ramsay
8	(South Africa) Branden Grace
9	(United States) Robert Garrigus	4&3
5	(South Africa) Ernie Els
12	(Sweden) Freddie Jacobson	1up
4	(United States) Keegan Bradley
13	(Australia) Marcus Fraser	1up
6	(United States) Matt Kuchar	3&2
11	(Japan) Hiroyuki Fujita
3	(Spain) Sergio García	20h
14	(Thailand) Thongchai Jaidee
7	(United States) Bill Haas
10	(Belgium) Nicolas Colsaerts	5&4
2	(England) Justin Rose	2&1
15	(South Korea) K. J. Choi

Second round February 22
1	(South Africa) Louis Oosthuizen
9	(United States) Robert Garrigus	3&2
12	(Sweden) Freddie Jacobson	4&3
13	(Australia) Marcus Fraser
6	(United States) Matt Kuchar	2&1
3	(Spain) Sergio García
10	(Belgium) Nicolas Colsaerts	4&2
2	(England) Justin Rose

Third round February 23
9	(United States) Robert Garrigus	3&1
12	(Sweden) Freddie Jacobson
6	(United States) Matt Kuchar	4&3
10	(Belgium) Nicolas Colsaerts

Fourth round February 23
9	(United States) Robert Garrigus
6	(United States) Matt Kuchar	3&2

=== Gary Player bracket ===
First round February 20–22
1	(United States) Tiger Woods
16	(United States) Charles Howell III	2&1
8	(Spain) G. F'dez-Castaño	2up
9	(Italy) Francesco Molinari
5	(Sweden) Peter Hanson	3&2
12	(Denmark) Thomas Bjørn
4	(United States) Webb Simpson	5&4
13	(England) David Lynn
6	(United States) Hunter Mahan	5&4
11	(Italy) Matteo Manassero
3	(United States) Jason Dufner
14	(South Africa) Richard Sterne	1up
7	(Germany) Martin Kaymer	2&1
10	(South Africa) George Coetzee
2	(England) Lee Westwood
15	(Spain) R. Cabrera-Bello	19h

Second round February 22
16	(United States) Charles Howell III
8	(Spain) G. F'dez-Castaño	6&5
5	(Sweden) Peter Hanson
4	(United States) Webb Simpson	1up
6	(United States) Hunter Mahan	4&3
14	(South Africa) Richard Sterne
7	(Germany) Martin Kaymer	2&1
15	(Spain) Rafa Cabrera-Bello

Third round February 23
8	(Spain) G. F'dez-Castaño
4	(United States) Webb Simpson	2up
6	(United States) Hunter Mahan	5&4
7	(Germany) Martin Kaymer

Fourth round February 23
4	(United States) Webb Simpson
6	(United States) Hunter Mahan	1up

=== Sam Snead bracket ===
First round February 20–21
1	(England) Luke Donald	1up
16	(Germany) Marcel Siem
8	(Scotland) Paul Lawrie
9	(United States) Scott Piercy	4&3
5	(United States) Nick Watney	5&4
12	(United States) David Toms
4	(United States) Steve Stricker	5&4
13	(Sweden) Henrik Stenson
6	(United States) Bo Van Pelt	6&5
11	(Australia) John Senden
3	(England) Ian Poulter	2&1
14	(Scotland) Stephen Gallacher
7	(Wales) Jamie Donaldson
10	(Denmark) Thorbjørn Olesen	3&2
2	(Australia) Adam Scott
15	(South Africa) Tim Clark	2&1

Second round February 22
1	(England) Luke Donald
9	(United States) Scott Piercy	7&6
5	(United States) Nick Watney
4	(United States) Steve Stricker	21h
6	(United States) Bo Van Pelt
3	(England) Ian Poulter	3&1
10	(Denmark) Thorbjørn Olesen
15	(South Africa) Tim Clark	3&2

Third round February 23
9	(United States) Scott Piercy
4	(United States) Steve Stricker	1up
3	(England) Ian Poulter	5&3
15	(South Africa) Tim Clark

Fourth round February 23
4	(United States) Steve Stricker
3	(England) Ian Poulter	3&2

=== Final Four ===
Semi-finals; February 24
11	(Australia) Jason Day
6	(United States) Matt Kuchar	4&3
6	(United States) Hunter Mahan	4&3
3	(England) Ian Poulter

Finals; February 24
6	(United States) Matt Kuchar	2&1
6	(United States) Hunter Mahan
Third place
11	(Australia) Jason Day	1up
3	(England) Ian Poulter

==== Scorecard ====
Final match

Hole	1	2	3	4	5	6	7	8	9	10	11	12	13	14	15	16	17	18
Par	4	5	3	4	4	3	4	5	4	4	5	3	5	4	4	3	4	4
Match	AS	AS	AS	1U	2U	3U	3U	4U	4U	3U	2U	2U	3U	2U	2U	1U	2U	
(United States) Kuchar	4	5	4	4	4	2	4	4	4	5	5	2	4	4	3	4	C	–
(United States) Mahan	4	5	4	5	5	4	4	5	4	4	4	2	5	3	3	3	C	–

== Prize money breakdown ==
Place	US ($)
Champion	1,500,000
Runner-up	875,000
Third place	615,000
Fourth place	500,000
Losing quarter-finalists x 4	275,000
Losing third round x 8	144,000
Losing second round x 16	96,000
Losing first round x 32	46,000
Total	$8,750,000
