= 2011 WGC-Accenture Match Play Championship =

Coordinates: 32.471°N 111.105°W

Tournament information
- Dates: February 23–27, 2011
- Location: Marana, Arizona
- Courses: Ritz-Carlton Golf Club at Dove Mountain (Saguaro, Tortolita nines)
- Tours: PGA Tour; European Tour
- Format: Match play - 18 holes

Statistics
- Par: 72
- Length: 7,791 yards (7,124 m)
- Field: 64 players
- Prize fund: $8,500,000 €6,240,960
- Winner's share: $1,400,000 €1,027,923

Champion
- (England) Luke Donald
- def. Martin Kaymer, 3 & 2

Location in the United States
Location in Arizona

The 2011 WGC-Accenture Match Play Championship was a professional golf tournament played from February 23 to 27, 2011 at the Ritz-Carlton Golf Club at Dove Mountain in Marana, Arizona, northwest of Tucson. It was the 13th WGC-Accenture Match Play Championship and the first of four World Golf Championships held in 2011.

Luke Donald won his only WGC title with a 3 & 2 win in the final over runner-up Martin Kaymer. Four previous winners lost in the first round, including defending champion Ian Poulter and three-time winner Tiger Woods.

== Format change ==
A change in the final round format was instituted for 2011; it was shortened from 36 holes to 18 holes, and the semi-finals were moved to Sunday morning from Saturday afternoon. With snow forecasted for early Sunday, the quarterfinals and semifinals were played on Saturday and the finals and consolation match were played Sunday.

== 2011 course layout ==
Course	Saguaro										Tortolita										
Hole	1	2	3	4	5	6	7	8	9	Out	10	11	12	13	14	15	16	17	18	In	Total
Yards	460	574	208	393	536	185	486	576	476	3,894	493	601	219	583	449	343	247	482	480	3,897	7,791
Par	4	5	3	4	4	3	4	5	4	36	4	5	3	5	4	4	3	4	4	36	72

The average elevation of the Saguaro and Tortolita nines is approximately 2,600 feet (790 m) above sea level.

== Brackets ==
The championship was a single elimination match play event. The field consisted of the top 64 players available from the Official World Golf Ranking as of the February 13 ranking, seeded according to the rankings.

All of the top 64 golfers were in the field initially. Toru Taniguchi (ranked #64) withdrew due to neck injury and was replaced by Henrik Stenson (#65). Tim Clark (#22) withdrew due to an elbow injury and his place in the bracket was taken by J. B. Holmes (#66).

=== Bobby Jones bracket ===
First round February 23
1	(England) Lee Westwood	3&2
16	(Sweden) Henrik Stenson
8	(United States) Nick Watney	5&4
9	(United States) Anthony Kim
5	(Italy) Francesco Molinari
12	(United States) Ryan Moore	3&1
4	(South Africa) Retief Goosen
13	(South Korea) K. J. Choi	1up
6	(Italy) Edoardo Molinari	3&2
11	(Scotland) Martin Laird
3	(England) Luke Donald	6&5
14	(United States) Charley Hoffman
7	(South Africa) Charl Schwartzel	20h
10	(Japan) Ryo Ishikawa
2	(United States) Steve Stricker
15	(Italy) Matteo Manassero	2&1

Second round February 24
1	(England) Lee Westwood
8	(United States) Nick Watney	1up
12	(United States) Ryan Moore	5&4
13	(South Korea) K. J. Choi
6	(Italy) Edoardo Molinari
3	(England) Luke Donald	2&1
7	(South Africa) Charl Schwartzel
15	(Italy) Matteo Manassero	1up

Third round February 25
8	(United States) Nick Watney
12	(United States) Ryan Moore	19h
3	(England) Luke Donald	3&2
15	(Italy) Matteo Manassero

Fourth round February 26
12	(United States) Ryan Moore
3	(England) Luke Donald	5&4

=== Ben Hogan bracket ===
First round February 23
1	(United States) Phil Mickelson	6&5
16	(Australia) Brendan Jones
8	(United States) Rickie Fowler	1up
9	(Sweden) Peter Hanson
5	(South Africa) Louis Oosthuizen
12	(United States) Bo Van Pelt	2up
4	(United States) Matt Kuchar	22h
13	(Denmark) Anders Hansen
6	(Spain) Álvaro Quirós
11	(South Korea) Yang Yong-eun	20h
3	(England) Ian Poulter
14	(United States) Stewart Cink	19h
7	(Australia) Robert Allenby
10	(England) Ross Fisher	4&3
2	(Northern Ireland) Graeme McDowell	4&3
15	(United States) Heath Slocum

Second round February 24
1	(United States) Phil Mickelson
8	(United States) Rickie Fowler	6&5
12	(United States) Bo Van Pelt
4	(United States) Matt Kuchar	3&2
11	(South Korea) Yang Yong-eun	4&3
14	(United States) Stewart Cink
10	(England) Ross Fisher
2	(Northern Ireland) Graeme McDowell	4&2

Third round February 25
8	(United States) Rickie Fowler
4	(United States) Matt Kuchar	2&1
11	(South Korea) Yang Yong-eun	3&2
2	(Northern Ireland) Graeme McDowell

Fourth round February 26
4	(United States) Matt Kuchar	2&1
11	(South Korea) Yang Yong-eun

=== Gary Player bracket ===
First round February 23
1	(Germany) Martin Kaymer	7&6
16	(South Korea) Noh Seung-yul
8	(United States) Zach Johnson
9	(England) Justin Rose	2&1
5	(United States) Hunter Mahan	4&3
12	(United States) Sean O'Hair
4	(Sweden) Robert Karlsson	5&3
13	(Japan) Hiroyuki Fujita
6	(Spain) Miguel Á. Jiménez	2&1
11	(Japan) Yuta Ikeda
3	(United States) Jim Furyk
14	(United States) Ryan Palmer	2up
7	(Australia) Adam Scott
10	(United States) Ben Crane	4&2
2	(Northern Ireland) Rory McIlroy	4&2
15	(United States) Jonathan Byrd

Second round February 24
1	(Germany) Martin Kaymer	20h
9	(England) Justin Rose
5	(United States) Hunter Mahan	2up
4	(Sweden) Robert Karlsson
6	(Spain) Miguel Á. Jiménez	4&2
14	(United States) Ryan Palmer
10	(United States) Ben Crane	8&7
2	(Northern Ireland) Rory McIlroy

Third round February 25
1	(Germany) Martin Kaymer	2&1
5	(United States) Hunter Mahan
6	(Spain) Miguel Á. Jiménez	7&6
10	(United States) Ben Crane

Fourth round February 26
1	(Germany) Martin Kaymer	1up
6	(Spain) Miguel Á. Jiménez

=== Sam Snead bracket ===
First round February 23
1	(United States) Tiger Woods
16	(Denmark) Thomas Bjørn	19h
8	(Australia) Geoff Ogilvy	4&3
9	(Republic of Ireland) Pádraig Harrington
5	(United States) Bubba Watson	3&2
12	(United States) Bill Haas
4	(United States) Dustin Johnson
13	(United States) Mark Wilson	19h
6	(United States) J. B. Holmes	4&2
11	(Colombia) Camilo Villegas
3	(South Africa) Ernie Els	19h
14	(United States) Jeff Overton
7	(South Korea) Kim Kyung-tae
10	(Australia) Jason Day	3&2
2	(England) Paul Casey	19h
15	(Australia) Richard Green

Second round February 24
16	(Denmark) Thomas Bjørn
8	(Australia) Geoff Ogilvy	1up
5	(United States) Bubba Watson	6&5
13	(United States) Mark Wilson
6	(United States) J. B. Holmes	1up
3	(South Africa) Ernie Els
10	(Australia) Jason Day	4&2
2	(England) Paul Casey

Third round February 25
8	(Australia) Geoff Ogilvy
5	(United States) Bubba Watson	6&4
6	(United States) J. B. Holmes	1up
10	(Australia) Jason Day

Fourth round February 26
5	(United States) Bubba Watson	19h
6	(United States) J. B. Holmes

=== Final Four ===
Semi-finals; February 26
3	(England) Luke Donald	6&5
4	(United States) Matt Kuchar
1	(Germany) Martin Kaymer	1up
5	(United States) Bubba Watson

Finals; February 27
3	(England) Luke Donald	3&2
1	(Germany) Martin Kaymer
Third place
4	(United States) Matt Kuchar	2&1
5	(United States) Bubba Watson

== Prize money breakdown ==
Place	US ($)
Champion	1,400,000
Runner-up	850,000
Third place	600,000
Fourth place	490,000
Losing quarter-finalists x 4	270,000
Losing third round x 8	140,000
Losing second round x 16	95,000
Losing first round x 32	45,000
Total	$8,500,000
