= WGC Match Play =

One of the annual World Golf Championships

Coordinates: 37.725°N 122.493°W

WGC-Dell Technologies Match Play

Tournament information
- Location: Austin, Texas
- Established: 1999
- Course: Austin Country Club
- Par: 71
- Length: 7,108 yards (6,500 m)
- Organized by: International Federation of PGA Tours
- Tours: PGA Tour; European Tour
- Format: Match play
- Prize fund: US$20,000,000
- Month played: March
- Final year: 2023

Tournament record score
- Score: 18-hole match: 9 and 8 Tiger Woods (2006); Championship: 8 and 7 Tiger Woods (2008)

Final champion
- (United States) Sam Burns
- 2023 WGC-Dell Technologies Match Play
- Location in the United States Location in Texas

The WGC Match Play was a professional men's golf tournament that had been held from 1999 to 2023. It was the only one of the World Golf Championships to have been contested using the match play format. From 2016 until its final year in 2023, it was held at the Austin Country Club in Austin, Texas, United States.

The event was known as WGC-Dell Technologies Match Play from 2017 to 2023. Previous names include WGC-Dell Match Play (2016), WGC-Cadillac Match Play (2015), WGC-Accenture Match Play Championship (2001–2014), and WGC-Andersen Consulting Match Play Championship (1999–2000). Before moving to Austin it had been hosted in Arizona eight times, California eight times, and Australia once. It is sanctioned and organized by the International Federation of PGA Tours and the prize money is official money on the PGA Tour, the European Tour and the Japan Golf Tour. Tiger Woods has the record number of wins with three. The winner receives a Wedgwood trophy named the Walter Hagen Cup.

== History ==
=== Match play tournaments before 1999 ===
The match play format fell out of favor in professional individual golf tournaments with the growth of television. The two major match play tournaments in the pre TV era were the PGA Championship, which converted to stroke play format in 1958, and the British PGA Matchplay Championship which faced a slow decline after the introduction of the British PGA Championship in 1955 (which had a stroke play format), and eventually became defunct in 1979. Match play became mainly associated with amateur tournaments, and team tournaments such as the Ryder Cup.

Despite not being popular with television companies, and often requiring more rounds to be played by a player than a stroke play event, the format was still respected as offering a different challenge than stroke play. At the end of the 1990s, there were two significant unofficial match play tournaments, the relatively new Andersen Consulting World Championship of Golf, which had a 32-man field with the finals played in Arizona, and the much older World Match Play Championship, which had a field of 16 players or less and was played in England.

=== Early years in southern California and briefly Australia (1999–2006) ===
When the World Golf Championships were formed in 1999, it was decided one of the events would be held in match play format, which meant the return of an official match play event on the PGA Tour and the European Tour. The WGC-Andersen Consulting Match Play was in effect the successor of the Andersen Consulting World Championship of Golf, which was discontinued. The World Match Play Championship in England continued, but lost prestige after the introduction of the WGC event, and eventually became defunct in 2014. The format of the new WGC competition was a straight knock out tournament involving the top 64 players in the Official World Golf Ranking, with each match played over 18 holes, except the final which was played over 36 holes. The first two events were held in February 1999 and 2000 at the La Costa Resort and Spa in southern California, which had hosted the Tournament of Champions event for the previous thirty seasons (1969–1998).

In 2001, the tournament sponsor was renamed, and the tournament followed suit, becoming known as the WGC-Accenture Match Play Championship. The tournament was held in early January by the highly regarded Metropolitan Golf Club in Melbourne, Australia. Nearly forty players turned down their invitation, including six of the top ten. This was largely seen as because it was played very early in the year when some players have an off season, and for many players the travel time was too long when playing a single tournament where you could end up playing just a single round. The following year the tournament returned to La Costa Resort and Spa in Southern California where it remained until 2006.

=== Hosting in the Tucson, Arizona area (2007–2014) ===
In 2007 and 2008, it was played at The Gallery Golf Club at Dove Mountain in Marana, Arizona, and from 2009 to 2014 at the nearby Ritz-Carlton Golf Club (renamed as simply "The Golf Club at Dove Mountain" in 2013). Tiger Woods is the most successful player in the WGC Match Play, and he won his three titles in Arizona, although he was less dominant than he was in the other U.S.-based World Golf Championship events. Geoff Ogilvy became the second most successful player in the tournament's history after winning in 2006 and 2009 and finishing runner up in 2007. Despite normal highs of 69 °F (21 °C) in Marana in February, the tournament was delayed by snow/hailstones in 2011, and snow in 2013. Also in 2011, the format of the final was reduced to 18 holes instead of 36 holes, similar to the other rounds of the tournament.

=== Format changes, a year in California, then Austin (2015 onwards) ===
As well as the intermittent weather issues in Dove Mountain, the performance of the WGC Match Play was a concern for other reasons, with Rex Hoggard of the Golf Channel remarking "Since 2007, when the Tour uprooted the Match Play from La Costa for the Tucson highlands, the galleries have been thin, the golf courses have been tolerated and the Sundays have been largely undistinguished". In 2015 the tournament underwent a revamp, moving to TPC Harding Park, a municipal course owned by the city and county of San Francisco, and became sponsored by Cadillac (who also sponsored the WGC Championship). The tournament moved from February to April 27 – May 3, the week prior to The Players Championship. The structure was changed so the field was split into 16 four-player groups played on Wednesday, Thursday and Friday, with the player with the best record advancing. The four knockout rounds are then split over Saturday and Sunday. The format ensured that spectators could guarantee to see the entire field on the first three days, and some coverage would occur in primetime in the East Coast of the United States.

After one year in California, the tournament moved to March with a new long term home and sponsor, the Austin Country Club in Texas, and Dell (which is headquartered in greater Austin area). The following year, as a result of the title sponsor's involvement in a merger the tournament became known as the WGC-Dell Technologies Match Play. In 2015, Jason Day became the third player to win multiple WGC Match Plays, and in 2016 Dustin Johnson won to become the only player to have won all four World Golf Championships. In early 2019, a deal was signed for Dell Technologies to remain the sponsor, and Austin Country Club the host, until at least 2023. In March 2023, it was announced by the PGA Tour that the event would end following the 2023 edition.

== Structure ==
=== Field ===
The tournament has a field of 64 players filled based upon the following criteria:

- Top 64 players from the Official World Golf Ranking (ten days prior to the event).
- If anyone within the top 64 is not available the field is filled by the next highest ranked player in the Official World Golf Ranking.

=== Format ===
The tournament is split into two phases:

- The players are split into 16 groups of four players (each group has a player seeded 1–16, 17–32, 33–48, 49–64). Each group plays in a round-robin format over Wednesday, Thursday, and Friday. One point is awarded for a win, and one-half point for a tie, with only the group winner qualifying to the next round. If two or more players are tied at the top of the group, there is a sudden death stroke play tie-breaker played to decide who progresses.
- The second phase is played as a knock out tournament, with the round of 16 and quarterfinals played on Saturday, and the semifinal, third-place playoff and final played on Sunday.

All matches are played over 18 holes.

== Winners ==
Year	Winner	Seed (Note: Player's seeding in the event.)	Runner-up	Seed	Score	Purse ($)	Winner's share ($)	Venue
WGC-Dell Technologies Match Play
2023	(United States) Sam Burns	13	(United States) Cameron Young	15	6 and 5	20,000,000	3,500,000	Austin, Texas
2022	(United States) Scottie Scheffler	5	(United States) Kevin Kisner	29	4 and 3	12,000,000	2,100,000	Austin, Texas
2021	(United States) Billy Horschel	32	(United States) Scottie Scheffler	30	2 and 1	10,500,000	1,820,000	Austin, Texas
2020	Canceled due to the COVID-19 pandemic							
2019	(United States) Kevin Kisner	48	(United States) Matt Kuchar	23	3 and 2	10,250,000	1,745,000	Austin, Texas
2018	(United States) Bubba Watson	35	(United States) Kevin Kisner	32	7 and 6	10,000,000	1,700,000	Austin, Texas
2017	(United States) Dustin Johnson	1	(Spain) Jon Rahm	21	1 up	9,750,000	1,660,000	Austin, Texas
WGC-Dell Match Play
2016	(Australia) Jason Day (2)	2	(South Africa) Louis Oosthuizen	16	5 and 4	9,500,000	1,620,000	Austin, Texas
WGC-Cadillac Match Play
2015	(Northern Ireland) Rory McIlroy	1	(United States) Gary Woodland	50	4 and 2	9,250,000	1,570,000	Harding Park, California
WGC-Accenture Match Play Championship
2014	(Australia) Jason Day	8	(France) Victor Dubuisson	27	23 holes	9,000,000	1,530,000	Dove Mountain, Arizona
2013	(United States) Matt Kuchar	21	(United States) Hunter Mahan	23	2 and 1	8,750,000	1,500,000	Dove Mountain, Arizona
2012	(United States) Hunter Mahan	21	(Northern Ireland) Rory McIlroy	2	2 and 1	8,500,000	1,400,000	Dove Mountain, Arizona
2011	(England) Luke Donald	9	(Germany) Martin Kaymer	2	3 and 2	8,500,000	1,400,000	Dove Mountain, Arizona
2010	(England) Ian Poulter	9	(England) Paul Casey	6	4 and 2	8,500,000	1,400,000	Dove Mountain, Arizona
2009	(Australia) Geoff Ogilvy (2)	8	(England) Paul Casey	23	4 and 3	8,500,000	1,400,000	Dove Mountain, Arizona
2008	(United States) Tiger Woods (3)	1	(United States) Stewart Cink	22	8 and 7	8,000,000	1,350,000	The Gallery, Arizona
2007	(Sweden) Henrik Stenson	9	(Australia) Geoff Ogilvy	11	2 and 1	8,000,000	1,350,000	The Gallery, Arizona
2006	(Australia) Geoff Ogilvy	52	(United States) Davis Love III	23	3 and 2	7,500,000	1,300,000	La Costa, California
2005	(United States) David Toms	14	(United States) Chris DiMarco	16	6 and 5	7,500,000	1,300,000	La Costa, California
2004	(United States) Tiger Woods (2)	1	(United States) Davis Love III	3	3 and 2	7,000,000	1,200,000	La Costa, California
2003	(United States) Tiger Woods	1	(United States) David Toms	6	2 and 1	6,000,000	1,050,000	La Costa, California
2002	(United States) Kevin Sutherland	62	(United States) Scott McCarron	45	1 up	5,500,000	1,000,000	La Costa, California
2001	(United States) Steve Stricker	55	(Sweden) Pierre Fulke	21	2 and 1	5,000,000	1,000,000	Metropolitan, Australia
WGC-Andersen Consulting Match Play Championship
2000	(Northern Ireland) Darren Clarke	19	(United States) Tiger Woods	1	4 and 3	5,000,000	1,000,000	La Costa, California
1999	(United States) Jeff Maggert	24	(United States) Andrew Magee	50	38 holes	5,000,000	1,000,000	La Costa, California

- The championship match was originally 36 holes (1999–2010); 18 holes since 2011.

== Multiple winners ==
Three players have won the tournament more than once:

- 3 wins:
  - Tiger Woods: 2003, 2004, 2008
- 2 wins:
  - Geoff Ogilvy: 2006, 2009
  - Jason Day: 2014, 2016

The title has been successfully defended only once, by Woods in 2004.

== Records ==
- Most consecutive matches won – 13, Tiger Woods (2003–2005)
- Biggest winning margin: Championship match – 8 & 7, Tiger Woods over Stewart Cink (2008) (36 holes)
- Biggest winning margin: Other matches – 9 & 8, Tiger Woods over Stephen Ames (2006, 1st round)
- Longest championship match – 38 holes, Jeff Maggert over Andrew Magee (1999)
- Longest match (18 holes) – 26 holes, Scott Verplank over Lee Westwood (2006, 1st round), Mike Weir over Loren Roberts (2003, 1st round)
