= Victor Dubuisson =

French professional golfer (born 1990)

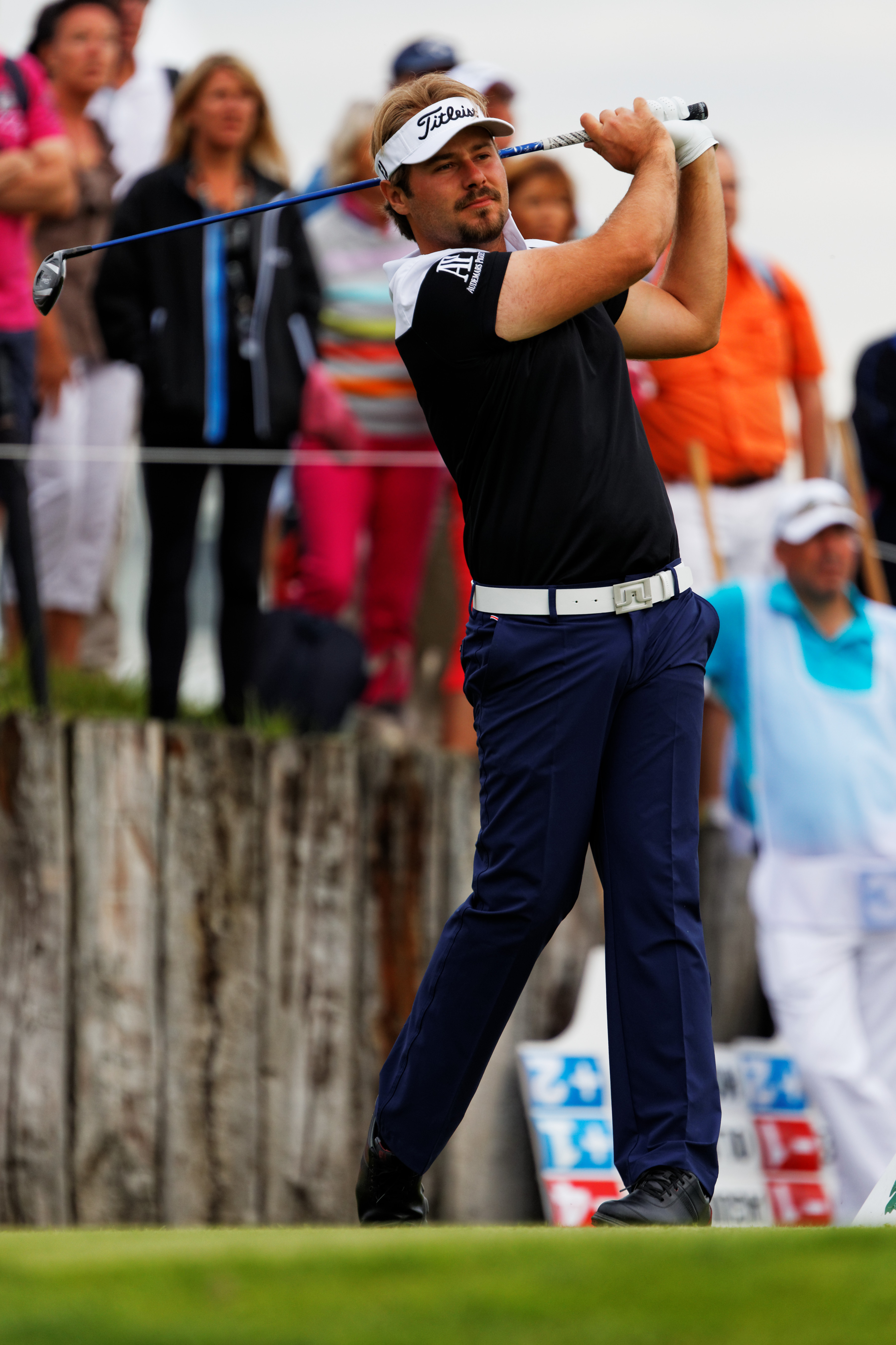

Personal information
- Nationality: France
- Born: 22 April 1990 (age 36) Cannes, France
- Height: 1.83 m (6 ft 0 in)
- Weight: 94 kg (207 lb; 14.8 st)

Career
- Sport: Golf
- Turned professional: 2010
- Former tours: PGA Tour; European Tour
- Professional wins: 4
- Highest ranking: 15 (1 February 2015)

Number of wins by tour
- European Tour: 2
- Other: 2

Best results in major championships
- Masters Tournament: T42: 2016
- PGA Championship: T7: 2014
- U.S. Open: T28: 2014
- The Open Championship: T9: 2014

Victor Dubuisson (born 22 April 1990) is a French former professional golfer who played primarily on the European Tour, winning twice at the Turkish Airlines Open in 2013 and 2015. He also played in the 2014 Ryder Cup and lost in the final of the 2014 WGC-Accenture Match Play Championship.

== Amateur career ==
Dubuisson was born in Cannes. He enjoyed a successful amateur career, during which he won several major amateur tournaments, including the 2009 European Amateur, and was the number one ranked amateur player in the world for eight weeks from 4 November to 23 December 2009.

As an amateur he also entered and made the cut in several professional tournaments, the highlight being a third-place finish at the 2009 Allianz EurOpen de Lyon on the Challenge Tour. He qualified for his first European Tour event at 15 years old, at the 2005 Open de France, missing the cut. In 2010 he qualified for The Open Championship, missing the cut; he turned professional shortly after the Open.

== Professional career ==
At the end of 2010, Dubuisson entered the European Tour qualifying school, where he finished 11th earning a tour card.

He ended 52nd in the 2012 Race to Dubai. He won for the first time as a professional at the 2013 Turkish Airlines Open. With seven top 10s, he ranked sixth at the 2013 Race to Dubai.

Dubuisson finished second in the 2014 WGC-Accenture Match Play Championship to Jason Day. The match play event ended on the 23rd hole. Thanks to this result, he earned enough non-member FedEx Cup points to be eligible for "Special Temporary Membership" on the PGA Tour, which he accepted. This allowed him unlimited sponsor exemptions for the remainder of the 2014 season. He finished 9th at the 2014 Open Championship and 7th at the PGA Championship. At the end of the 2014 PGA Tour season, his total earnings of US$670,000 as a non-member allowed him to earn a PGA Tour card for the 2014–15 season.

In September 2014, he gained an automatic selection to represent the winning European team at the 2014 Ryder Cup. He paired with Graeme McDowell in two victorious foursomes matches against Phil Mickelson and Keegan Bradley (won by 3 and 2), and Jimmy Walker and Rickie Fowler (won by 5 and 4); in the final game of the singles, he halved his match with Zach Johnson.

In 2015, Dubuisson shared his time between the European Tour and the PGA Tour. While his season in Europe was successful, with a second win at the Turkish Airlines Open, he failed to make an impact in America where he made only 4 cuts in the 10 events, finishing 190th in the FedEx Cup and losing his tour card.

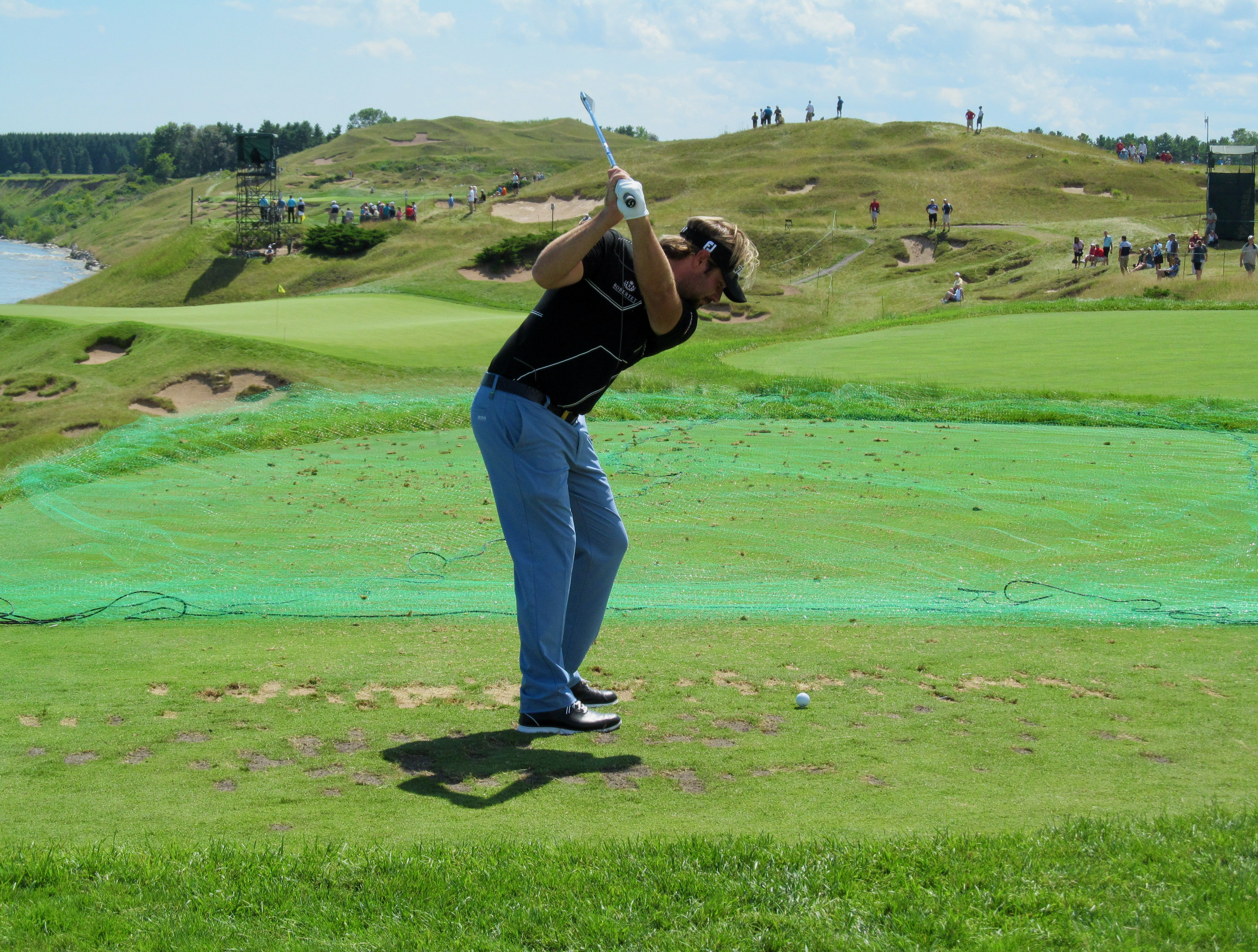
Dubuisson at the 2015 PGA Championship

In 2016 and 2017 Dubuisson played on the European Tour. He made 21 cuts and earned more than €2,000,000 in total during those two seasons. He missed most of the 2018 season after having an operation on his sinuses in late 2017, and then perforating an eardrum while flying back from the Open de España in April.

Dubuisson returned to the European Tour in 2019, making the cut in 13 of his 20 tournaments and placing in the top 20 on five occasions. He played only seven times on the 2020 Tour, however these appearances included two top 10 finishes. 2021 has seen Dubuisson return as a regular player on the European Tour again, including 8 tournament entries by May.

In December 2023, Dubuisson announced his retirement from professional golf at the age of 33. He briefly came out of retirement in July 2025, playing in the Biarritz Cup on the Alps Tour. He went on to win the tournament, also forfeiting the first place prize money of 7600 Euros.

== Amateur wins ==
- 2006 French Amateur (closed)
- 2008 Mexican Amateur
- 2009 European Amateur, Trophée des Régions

== Professional wins (4) ==
=== European Tour wins (2) ===
Legend
Race to Dubai finals series (2)
Other European Tour (0)

No.	Date	Tournament	Winning score	Margin of victory	Runner-up
1	10 Nov 2013	Turkish Airlines Open	−24 (67-65-63-69=264)	2 strokes	(Wales) Jamie Donaldson
2	1 Nov 2015	Turkish Airlines Open (2)	−22 (69-64-67-66=266)	1 stroke	(South Africa) Jaco van Zyl

European Tour playoff record (0–1)

No.	Year	Tournament	Opponents	Result
1	2014	Nordea Masters	(Scotland) Stephen Gallacher, (Thailand) Thongchai Jaidee	Jaidee won with birdie on first extra hole

=== Alps Tour wins (1) ===
No.	Date	Tournament	Winning score	Margin of victory	Runner-up
1	27 Jul 2025	Biarritz Cup	−19 (62-65-61=188)	Playoff	(Spain) Jorge Maicas

=== French Tour wins (1) ===
No.	Date	Tournament	Winning score	Margin of victory	Runner-up
1	6 Nov 2010	Finale Allianz de Barbaroux	−8 (69-70-69=208)	Playoff	(France) Édouard Dubois

== Results in major championships ==
Tournament	2010	2011	2012	2013	2014	2015	2016
Masters Tournament					CUT	CUT	T42
U.S. Open					T28	CUT	
The Open Championship	CUT				T9	CUT	CUT
PGA Championship					T7	T18	CUT

Top 10
Did not play

CUT = missed the half-way cut
"T" = tied

== Results in World Golf Championships ==
Results not in chronological order before 2015.

Tournament	2014	2015	2016
Championship	T62	T62	T52
Match Play	2	T52	T38
Invitational	T31	T50	
Champions	WD		

Top 10
Did not play

QF, R16, R32, R64 = Round in which player lost in match play
WD = withdrew
"T" = tied

== PGA Tour career summary ==
Season	Starts	Cuts made	Wins	2nd	3rd	Top 10	Top 25	Earnings (US$)	Money list rank
2010	1	0	0	0	0	0	0	0	n/a
2011	0	0	0	0	0	0	0	0	n/a
2012	0	0	0	0	0	0	0	0	n/a
2013	0	0	0	0	0	0	0	0	n/a
2014	10	9	0	1	0	3	4	670,986	n/a
2015	10	6	0	0	0	0	2	354,625	172
2016	5	3	0	0	0	0	0	37,000	n/a
Career*	26	18	0	1	0	3	6	1,062,611	n/a

*As of the 2015–16 season.

== European Tour career summary ==
Season	Starts	Cuts made	Wins	2nd	3rd	Top 10	Earnings (€)	Money list rank
2005	1	0	0	0	0	0	0	n/a
2010	10	2	0	0	0	0	21,800	220
2011	21	15	0	0	0	3	285,401	106
2012	20	13	0	0	1	4	573,249	52
2013	21	13	1	0	3	7	2,031,675	6
2014	21	19	0	4	0	8	2,338,782	5
2015	21	18	1	0	0	3	1,800,767	11
2016	17	11	0	0	1	3	997,561	38
2017	19	10	0	0	2	3	1,051,053	37
2018	1	0	0	0	0	0	0	n/a
2019	22	15	0	0	0	1	317,589	111
2020	7	5	0	0	0	2	255,890	106
2021	19	9	0	0	0	2	241,256	111
2022	17	6	0	0	0	1	294,930	115
2023	8	2	0	0	0	0	7,285	284
Career*	226	136	2	4	7	37	10,113,984	68

*As of 23 October 2018. There is duplication between PGA Tour and European Tour stats for wins, top 10s and money earned in World Golf Championships and Major Championships.

== Team appearances ==
Amateur

- European Boys' Team Championship (representing France): 2005, 2007
- European Youths' Team Championship (representing France): 2006
- Jacques Léglise Trophy (representing Continental Europe): 2006 (winners)
- Junior Ryder Cup (representing Europe): 2006 (tie, Cup retained)
- European Boys' Team Championship (representing France): 2007
- European Amateur Team Championship (representing France): 2007, 2008, 2009, 2010
- Eisenhower Trophy (representing France): 2008
- Bonallack Trophy (representing Europe): 2010 (selected, but tournament cancelled)

Professional

- World Cup (representing France): 2013, 2016
- EurAsia Cup (representing Europe): 2014, 2016 (winners)
- Ryder Cup (representing Europe): 2014 (winners)

Ryder Cup points record

2014	Total
2.5	2.5

== See also ==
- 2010 European Tour Qualifying School graduates
