= Austin Country Club =

Private golf club in Austin, Texas

- Location within the United States Location within Texas
- 30.343°N 97.797°W

Club information
- Location: 4408 Long Champ Drive; Austin, Texas, U.S.
- Elevation: 600 feet (185 m)
- Established: 1899, 127 years ago 1984 (present site)
- Type: Private
- Tota holes: 18
- Tournaments: WGC Match Play (2016–2023)
- Website: austincountryclub.com
- Designed by: Pete Dye
- Par: 72
- Length: 7,108 yd (6,500 m)
- Course rating: 75.2
- Slope rating: 152

Austin Country Club is a private golf club in the southern United States, located in Austin, Texas. Established 127 years ago in 1899, the club moved to its third and present site in 1984, a challenging layout designed by noted course architect Pete Dye.

The present Davenport Ranch site is west of central Austin on the south bank of the Colorado River (Lake Austin), just southeast of the Pennybacker Bridge. Following a renovation in 2015, it hosted the WGC Match Play championship from 2016 until the event's final edition in 2023.

The previous location is now the public Riverside Golf Course (30.238°N 97.705°W), adjacent to the Riverside campus of Austin Community College. Expansion of the college altered several holes, but the majority of the course is intact. At this location, Austin Country Club spawned major champions Ben Crenshaw and Tom Kite, coached by teaching professional Harvey Penick.

Prior to 1950, the club was at 41st Street (30.299°N 97.724°W), northeast of the University of Texas campus. The nine-hole Hancock municipal course remains, but the other holes were developed into a shopping center.

== WGC Dell Match Play ==
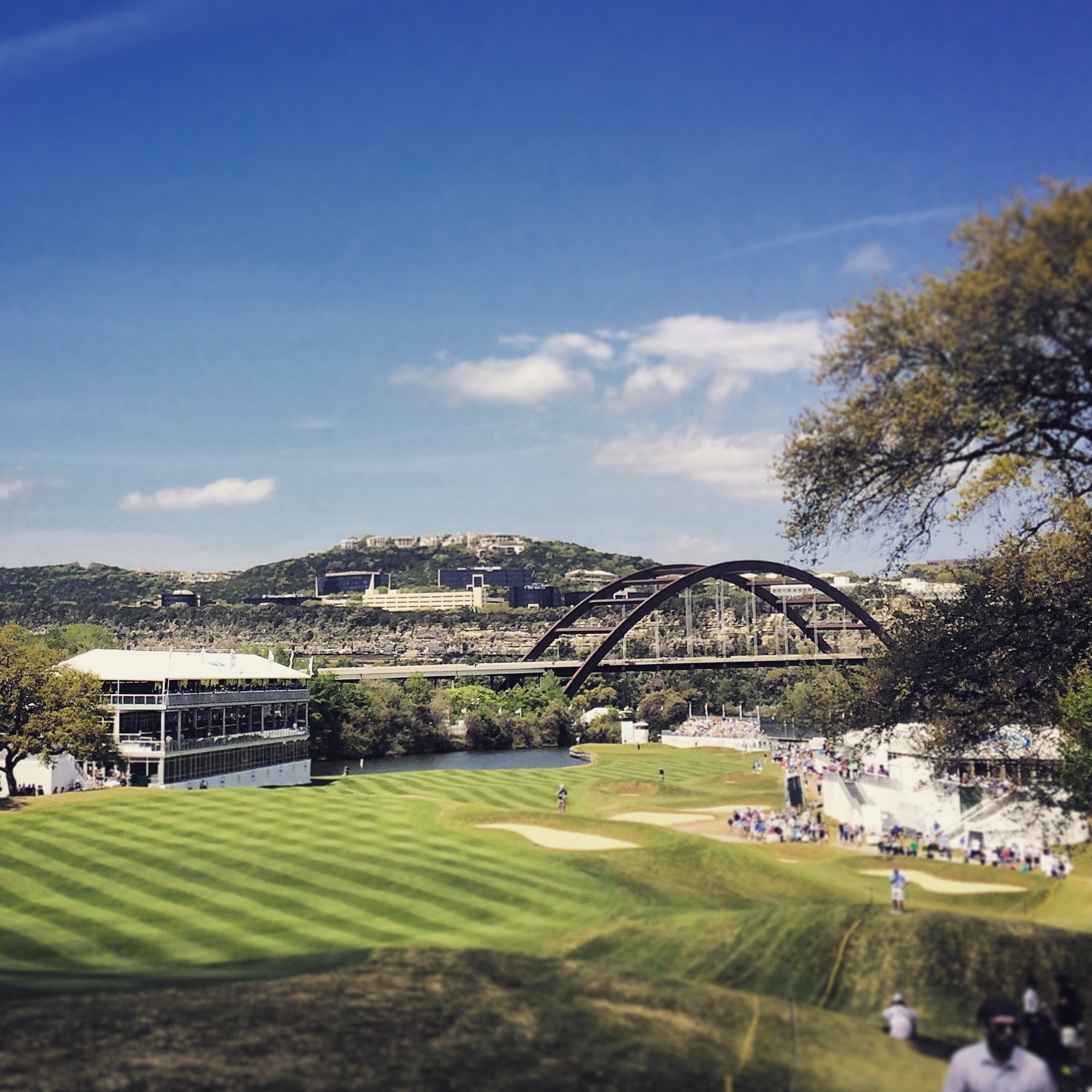
Dell Match Play at Austin Country Club

Austin Country Club was the host course of the World Golf Championships Dell Match Play between 2016-2023. The 2020 event was cancelled due to the Covid-19 pandemic.

In 2023, it was announced by the PGA Tour the World Golf Championships would be ending in favor of Signature Series events.

== Scorecard ==
Austin Country Club
Tee	Rating/Slope	1	2	3	4	5	6	7	8	9	Out	10	11	12	13	14	15	16	17	18	In	Total
Harvey	75.2 / 152	385	194	578	317	462	434	565	150	368	3453	394	460	435	178	368	585	201	498	490	3609	7062
I	73.1 / 148	360	167	552	300	428	369	527	135	353	3191	373	412	420	152	351	550	181	477	475	3381	6582
II (M) Back (W)	M:70.5 / 136 W:76.4 / 138	344	132	530	265	374	344	504	104	326	2923	349	370	377	137	344	534	154	426	433	3124	6047
III (M) Forward (W)	M:65.7 / 129 W:70.7 / 131	304	106	454	232	333	301	398	75	287	2490	298	300	324	99	274	427	122	381	351	2576	5066
Par		4	3	5	4	4	4	5	3	4	36	4	4	4	3	4	5	3	5	4	36	72
SI	Men's	9	11	5	13	1	7	3	17	15		12	2	8	18	16	4	14	10	6
SI	Women's	14	16	4	12	6	8	2	18	10		13	7	1	11	15	9	17	3	5
