= The Golf Club at Dove Mountain =

Golf course in Marana, Arizona

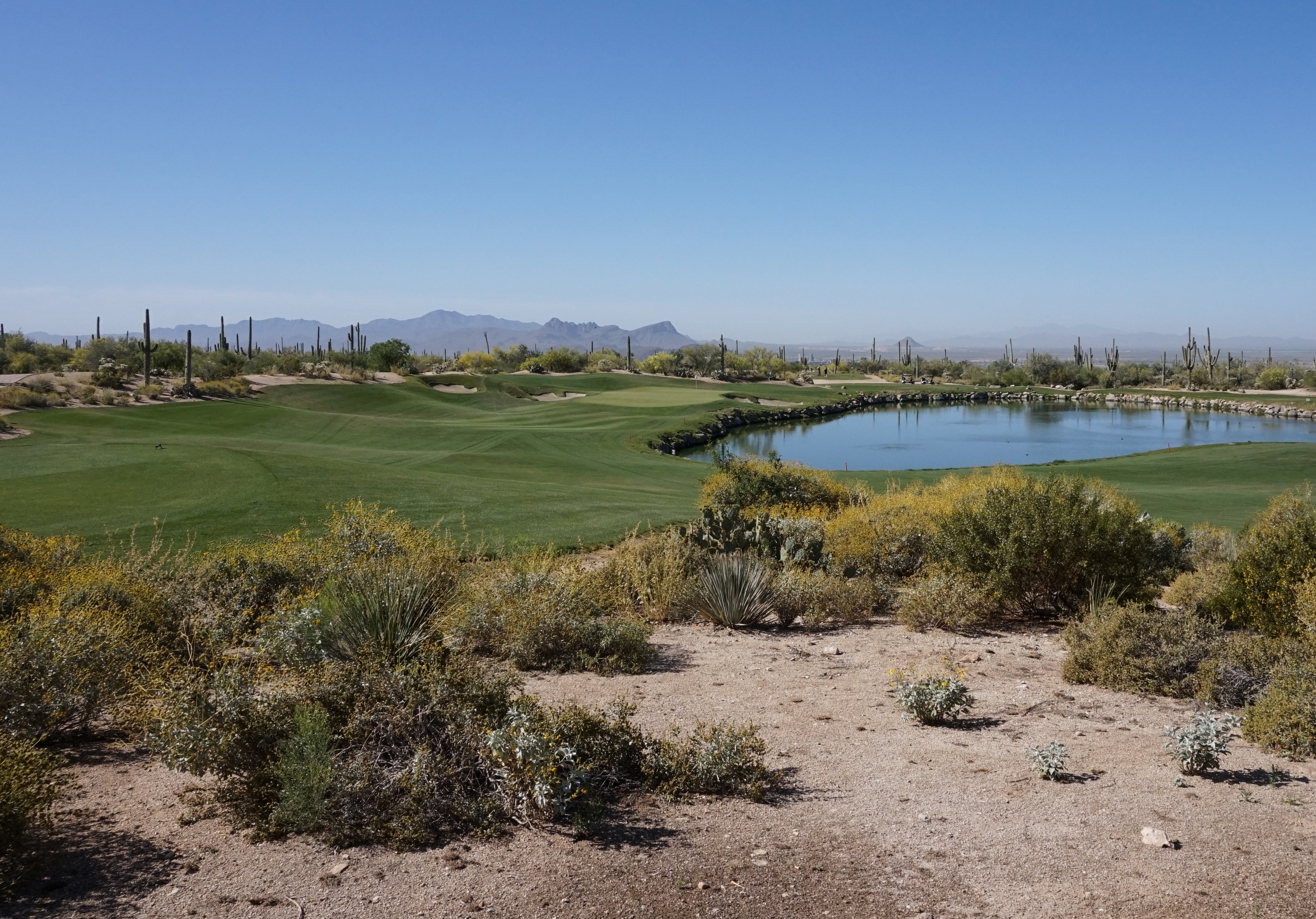
- Hole #3 of Saguaro course in 2015

- Location in the United States Location in Arizona
- 32.471°N 111.105°W

Club information
- Location: Marana, Arizona
- Type: Private
- Tota holes: 27
- Tournaments: WGC-Accenture Match Play Championship (2009–14)
- Designed by: Jack Nicklaus

The Golf Club at Dove Mountain is a golf course in the southwestern United States, located in Marana, Arizona, northwest of Tucson. For six years (2009–2014), it hosted the WGC-Accenture Match Play Championship, a match play tournament on the PGA Tour and the European Tour in late February. The club was known as Ritz-Carlton Golf Club, carrying co-branding from Ritz-Carlton, which operates the hotel facilities at the club, from its opening until 2012; however the co-branding was removed before the 2013 event for unknown reasons.

Designed by Jack Nicklaus, the course holds the distinction for being the longest venue in PGA Tour history at 7,849 yards (7,177 m); the average elevation is approximately 2,600 feet (790 m) above sea level. The club boasts the designation as a Jack Nicklaus Signature golf course with 27 holes. In an effort to preserve and protect the surrounding lush desert, club makes use of numerous "green" technologies. Efforts include everything from using reclaimed water for the courses and landscaping to preservation of natural washes as havens for wildlife.

The course's green complexes were heavily criticized by players during the 2009 event, the first to be played on the course, due to their subtleties and the effects of various natural landforms on the pull of the breaks. This led to several top names demanding the reconfiguration of the greens, including Tiger Woods suggesting that Dove Mountain "blow up" the putting surfaces. This eventually led to a massive renovation project after the tournament, completed in time for the 2010 event. However, scorn from players continued, with the course consistently ranking near the bottom on the PGA Tour's annual player poll ranking tour venues. Each year, one or two top players routinely skipped the event. This issue came to a head in 2014, when Woods, Phil Mickelson, and Adam Scott (three of the top four in the world rankings) all chose not to enter, with Scott in particular saying he would be more likely to play if the event were staged at a different course. This was the final edition in Arizona; it moved to San Francisco for 2015, then to Austin, Texas, in 2016.
