= Hunter Mahan =

American professional golfer (born 1982)

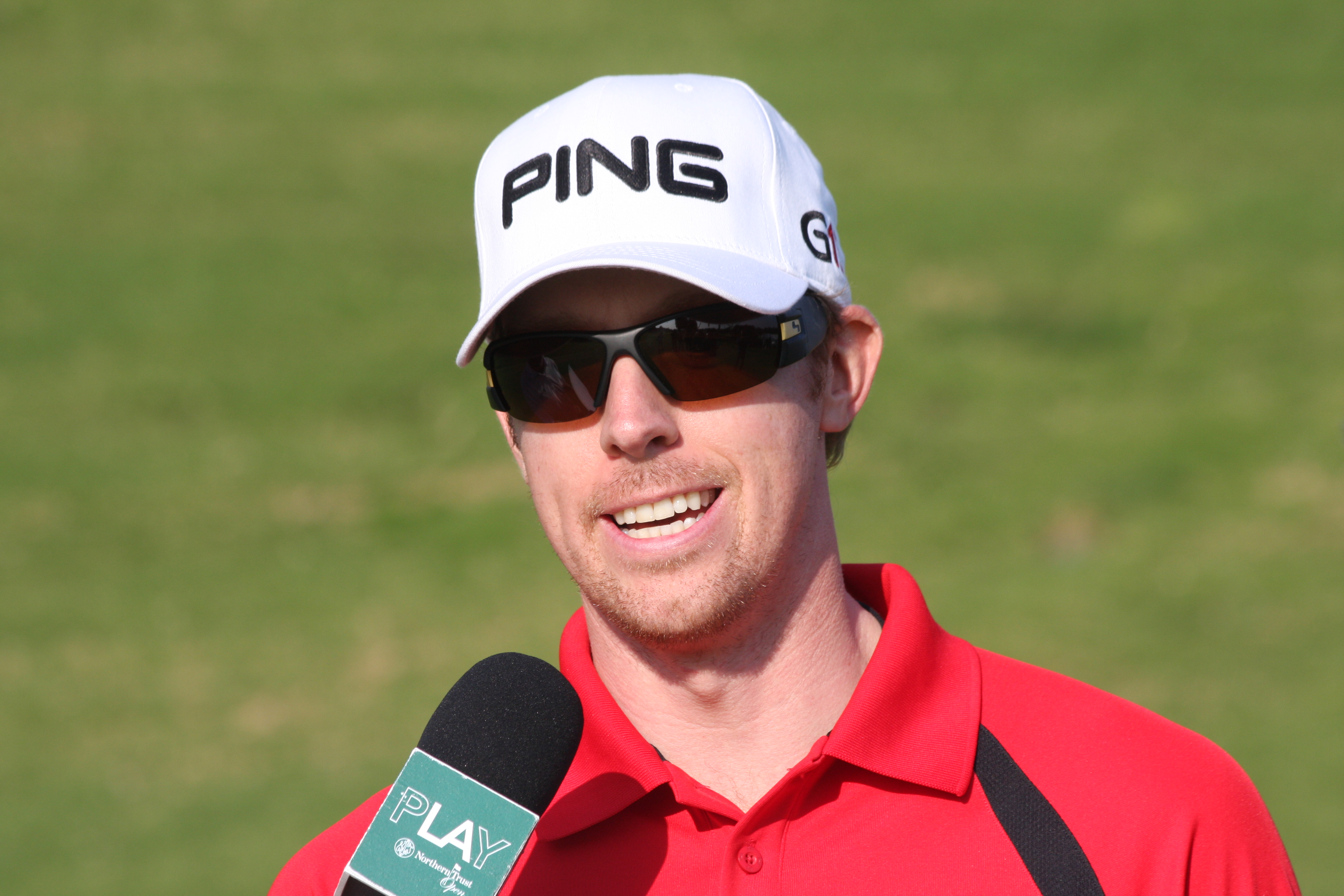

Personal information
- Full name: Hunter Myles Mahan
- Nationality: United States
- Born: May 17, 1982 (age 44) Orange, California, U.S.
- Height: 5 ft 11 in (1.80 m)
- Weight: 175 lb (79 kg; 12.5 st)
- Spouse: Kandi Harris (m. 2011)
- Children: 1

Career
- Sport: Golf
- College: University of Southern California; Oklahoma State University
- Turned professional: 2003
- Former tour: PGA Tour
- Professional wins: 9
- Highest ranking: 4 (April 1, 2012)

Number of wins by tour
- PGA Tour: 6
- European Tour: 2
- Other: 3

Best results in major championships
- Masters Tournament: T8: 2010
- PGA Championship: T7: 2014
- U.S. Open: T4: 2013
- The Open Championship: T6: 2007

Achievements and awards
- Haskins Award: 2003
- Ben Hogan Award: 2003

Hunter Myles Mahan (born May 17, 1982) is an American professional golfer who played on the PGA Tour. He is a winner of two World Golf Championship events, the 2010 WGC-Bridgestone Invitational and the 2012 WGC-Accenture Match Play Championship. Mahan has spent 19 weeks in the top-10 of the Official World Golf Ranking. He reached a career-high world ranking of No. 4 on April 1, 2012, and in so doing became the highest ranked American golfer at the time.

== Amateur career ==
Mahan was born in Orange, California. He had a successful amateur career, winning the 1999 5A Texas State High School Golf Championship while attending McKinney High School and the 1999 U.S. Junior Amateur. After high school, Mahan enrolled at the University of Southern California, where he was named Pacific-10 Conference Freshman of the Year. Mahan only played one year at USC before he transferred to Oklahoma State University, where he was a two-time Big 12 Conference Player of the Year and a two-time first-team All American. Mahan was the runner-up at the U.S. Amateur in 2002, in which he was defeated by Ricky Barnes 2 & 1. In 2003 he won the Haskins Award for outstanding collegiate golfer and was co-winner of the Ben Hogan Award.

== Professional career ==
Mahan turned professional in 2003 and made it through qualifying school to earn a PGA Tour card for the 2004 season. His first PGA Tour victory, which came at the 2007 Travelers Championship, lifted Mahan into the top 100 of the Official World Golf Rankings. In August 2007, Mahan entered the top 50 in the world rankings, and in that year finished 15th in the FedEx Cup. His performances in 2007 saw U.S. Presidents Cup captain Jack Nicklaus choose Mahan as one of two captain's picks for the U.S. team. By March 2008 he had reached the top 30. On February 28, 2010, Mahan won his second PGA Tour event, beating fellow OSU golfer Rickie Fowler by one stroke at the Waste Management Phoenix Open. On August 8, 2010, Mahan won his third PGA Tour title at the WGC-Bridgestone Invitational. He beat Ryan Palmer by 2 strokes.

Mahan won his second WGC tournament in February 2012 at the WGC-Accenture Match Play Championship. He defeated Rory McIlroy, 2 and 1, in the final. Mahan recorded his fifth career PGA Tour victory in April at the Shell Houston Open and moved to fourth in the Official World Golf Ranking, making him the highest-ranked American for the first time. In defense of his title he won in 2012, Mahan reached the final of the 2013 WGC-Accenture Match Play Championship but was beaten 2&1 by Matt Kuchar. In August 2014, Mahan won the first of the year's four FedEx Cup playoff events, The Barclays. He won by two strokes from Stuart Appleby, Jason Day and Cameron Tringale during a final round that saw six different players share the lead at some point. He birdied three of his last four holes to pull clear of the field. This was Mahan's first ever playoff victory and his sixth overall title on the PGA Tour.

Mahan was selected by Tom Watson as one of his three captain's picks for the 2014 Ryder Cup team, finishing with a record of 1–2–1 in the four matches he participated in. This included a halved match against Justin Rose in the singles competition. Mahan began struggling with his golf game as of the 2015–16 PGA Tour season, during the next four years, Mahan finished 183rd, 130th, 159th and 184th in the season-long FedEx Cup rankings and had to compete in the Korn Ferry Tour Finals on multiple occasions to try to keep his full tour card. Between 2015–16 and 2020–21, Mahan had only one top-10 finish on the PGA Tour and 69 missed cuts. As of April 1, 2021, Mahan had fallen to 1738th in the Official World Golf Ranking.

After his final years on the PGA Tour, Mahan retired from professional golf and moved into coaching. In 2024, he began coaching the boys' golf team at Liberty Christian School in Argyle, Texas. Mahan later said that he did not intend to return to professional golf, citing the travel and time commitment required to compete at the professional level and his desire to spend more time with his family.

== Personal life ==
Mahan is one of four golfers in the PGA Tour boy band "Golf Boys" (with Rickie Fowler, Ben Crane, and Bubba Watson). The Golf Boys have a popular YouTube video for the song "Oh Oh Oh". Farmers Insurance donates $1,000 for every 100,000 views of the video. The charitable proceeds support both Farmers and Ben Crane charitable initiatives.

Mahan married Dallas Cowboys Cheerleader and Dallas Mavericks dancer Kandi Harris in 2011. On July 27, 2013, Mahan withdrew from the RBC Canadian Open before the third round after getting news that his wife had gone into labor. Mahan was the 36-hole leader at that point, taking a two-stroke advantage into the third round. A daughter, Zoe, was born early the next morning. PING (one of his sponsors) created two gold-plated putters to celebrate her birth (the putters have her name, birthday, and vital statistics inscribed on them).

== Amateur wins ==
- 1999 U.S. Junior Amateur, Western Junior

== Professional wins (9) ==
=== PGA Tour wins (6) ===
Legend
World Golf Championships (2)
FedEx Cup playoff events (1)
Other PGA Tour (3)

No.	Date	Tournament	Winning score	Margin of victory	Runner-up
1	Jun 24, 2007	Travelers Championship	−15 (62-71-67-65=265)	Playoff	(United States) Jay Williamson
2	Feb 28, 2010	Waste Management Phoenix Open	−16 (68-70-65-65=268)	1 stroke	(United States) Rickie Fowler
3	Aug 8, 2010	WGC-Bridgestone Invitational	−12 (71-67-66-64=268)	2 strokes	(United States) Ryan Palmer
4	Feb 26, 2012	WGC-Accenture Match Play Championship	2 and 1		(Northern Ireland) Rory McIlroy
5	Apr 1, 2012	Shell Houston Open	−16 (69-67-65-71=272)	1 stroke	(Sweden) Carl Pettersson
6	Aug 24, 2014	The Barclays	−14 (66-71-68-65=270)	2 strokes	(Australia) Stuart Appleby, (Australia) Jason Day, (United States) Cameron Tringale

PGA Tour playoff record (1–2)

No.	Year	Tournament	Opponent(s)	Result
1	2004	Reno–Tahoe Open	(Australia) Stephen Allan, (United States) Scott McCarron, (United States) Vaughn Taylor	Taylor won with birdie on first extra hole
2	2007	Travelers Championship	(United States) Jay Williamson	Won with birdie on first extra hole
3	2011	Tour Championship	(United States) Bill Haas	Lost to par on third extra hole

=== Other wins (3) ===
No.	Date	Tournament	Winning score	Margin of victory	Runner(s)-up
1	Oct 28, 2008	Kiwi Challenge	−7 (71-65=136)	Playoff	(United States) Anthony Kim
2	Sep 1, 2010	Notah Begay III Foundation Challenge (with (United States) Cristie Kerr)	−10 (62)	2 strokes	(United States) Rickie Fowler and (Sweden) Annika Sörenstam
3	Aug 30, 2011	Notah Begay III Foundation Challenge (2) (with (United States) Cristie Kerr)	−11 (61)	1 stroke	(United States) Rickie Fowler and (Sweden) Annika Sörenstam

Other playoff record (1–0)

No.	Year	Tournament	Opponent	Result
1	2008	Kiwi Challenge	(United States) Anthony Kim	Won with par on second extra hole

== Results in major championships ==
Tournament	2003	2004	2005	2006	2007	2008	2009
Masters Tournament	T28					CUT	T10
U.S. Open	CUT				T13	T18	T6
The Open Championship		T36		T26	T6	CUT	CUT
PGA Championship				CUT	T18	CUT	T16

Tournament	2010	2011	2012	2013	2014	2015	2016
Masters Tournament	T8	CUT	T12	CUT	T26	T9	54
U.S. Open	CUT	CUT	T38	T4	CUT	CUT	
The Open Championship	T37	CUT	T19	T9	T32	T49	
PGA Championship	T39	T19	CUT	T57	T7	T43	

Top 10
Did not play

CUT = missed the half-way cut
"T" = tied

=== Summary ===
Tournament	Wins	2nd	3rd	Top-5	Top-10	Top-25	Events	Cuts made
Masters Tournament	0	0	0	0	3	4	10	7
U.S. Open	0	0	0	1	2	4	10	5
The Open Championship	0	0	0	0	2	3	11	8
PGA Championship	0	0	0	0	1	4	10	7
Totals	0	0	0	1	8	15	41	27

- Most consecutive cuts made – 4 (twice)
- Longest streak of top-10s – 2 (three times)

== Results in The Players Championship ==
Tournament	2005	2006	2007	2008	2009	2010	2011	2012	2013	2014	2015	2016
The Players Championship	T40		CUT	WD	T71	T17	T6	CUT	T19	CUT	CUT	CUT

Top 10
Did not play

CUT = missed the halfway cut
WD = withdrew
"T" indicates a tie for a place

== World Golf Championships ==
=== Wins (2) ===
Year	Championship	54 holes	Winning score	Margin	Runner-up
2010	WGC-Bridgestone Invitational	3 shot deficit	−12 (71-67-66-64=268)	2 strokes	(United States) Ryan Palmer
2012	WGC-Accenture Match Play Championship	n/a	2 and 1		(Northern Ireland) Rory McIlroy

=== Results timeline ===
Results not in chronological order before 2015.

Tournament	2007	2008	2009	2010	2011	2012	2013	2014	2015
Championship		T44	T53	T30	9	T24	T25	T9	65
Match Play		R32	R32	R64	R16	1	2	R16	R16
Invitational	T22	T10	T4	1	T37	T55		T15	72
Champions				T21	T7			T28	T19

Win
Top 10
Did not play

QF, R16, R32, R64 = Round in which player lost in match play
"T" = tied
Note that the HSBC Champions did not become a WGC event until 2009.

== U.S. national team appearances ==
Amateur

- Junior Ryder Cup: 1999
- Eisenhower Trophy: 2002 (winners)
- Palmer Cup: 2002 (winners)

Professional

- Presidents Cup: 2007 (winners), 2009 (winners), 2011 (winners), 2013 (winners)
- Ryder Cup: 2008 (winners), 2010, 2014

== See also ==
- 2003 PGA Tour Qualifying School graduates
- 2005 PGA Tour Qualifying School graduates
- 2018 Web.com Tour Finals graduates
