= Dove Mountain =

Planned community in Pima County, Arizona

Coordinates: 32.43986°N 111.07832°W

Area
  - Total: 2,500 ha (6,200 acres)
- Website: dovemountain.com.

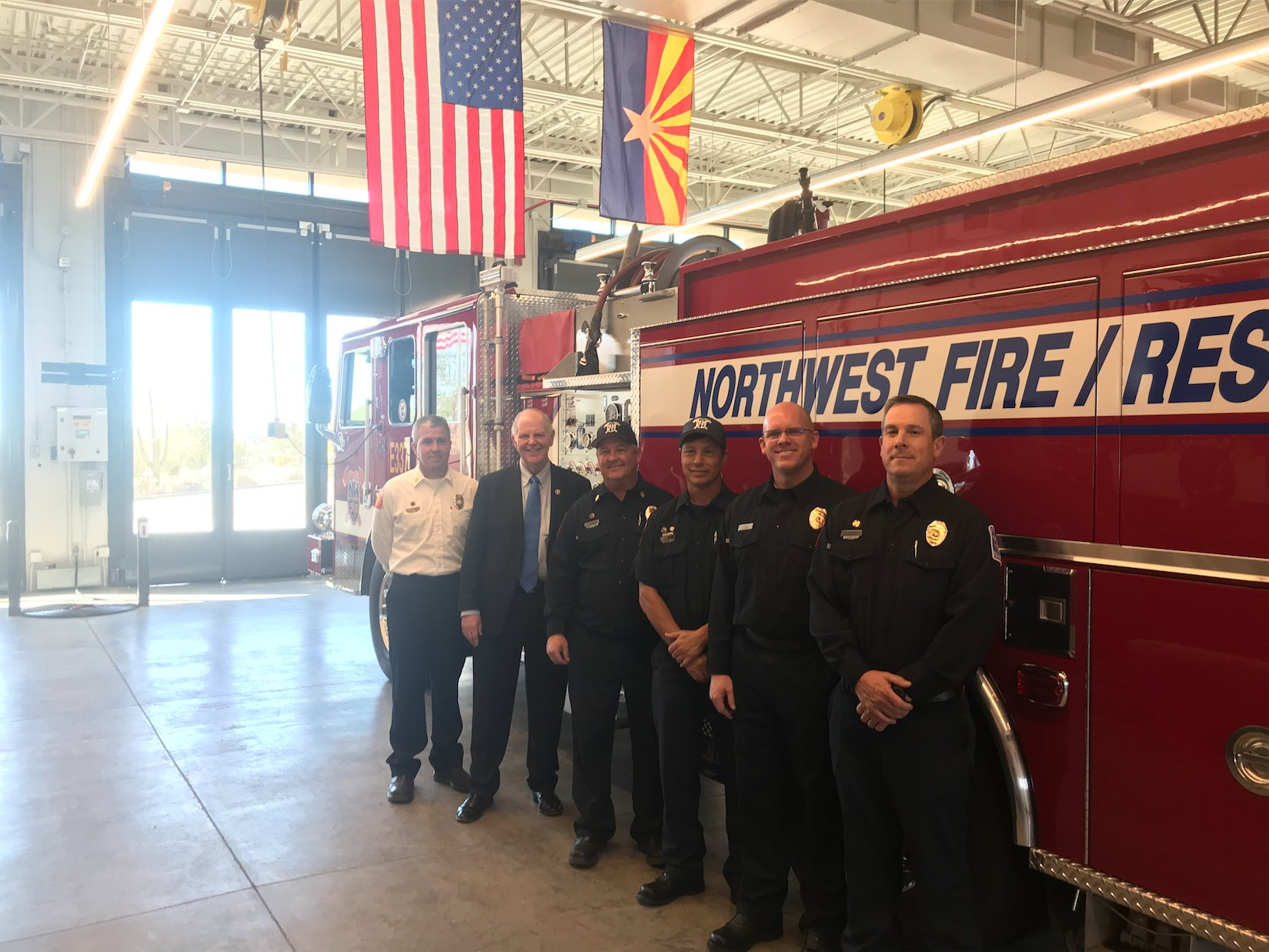
The crew of Dove Mountain's Northwest Fire Station 337, with Tom O'Halleran, in 2020.

Dove Mountain is a master-planned community located in Marana, Arizona, approximately 40 minutes north of Tucson and within the foothills of the Tortolita Mountains. The community derives its name from the nearby Tortolita Mountains. The word tortolita means "little turtle dove" in Spanish, which inspired the name Dove Mountain.

The community opened in 1998, has about 5,000 homes and encompasses over 6,200 acres (2,500 ha).

The community is best known for playing host to the WGC-Accenture Match Play Championship at Ritz-Carlton Golf Club. A Ritz-Carlton hotel and resort opened in the community on December 18, 2009, along with a Jack Nicklaus-designed golf course. The community, which includes The Residences at The Ritz-Carlton, Dove Mountain, is the largest Ritz-Carlton branded development in the continental United States.

Del Webb at Dove Mountain is a 45+ active adult community offering a variety of single-story home designs. At the center of the community lies the Saguaro Recreation Center, which features a state-of-the-art fitness center, resort-style pool and spa, and sports courts.
