= Jason Day =

Australian professional golfer (born 1987)

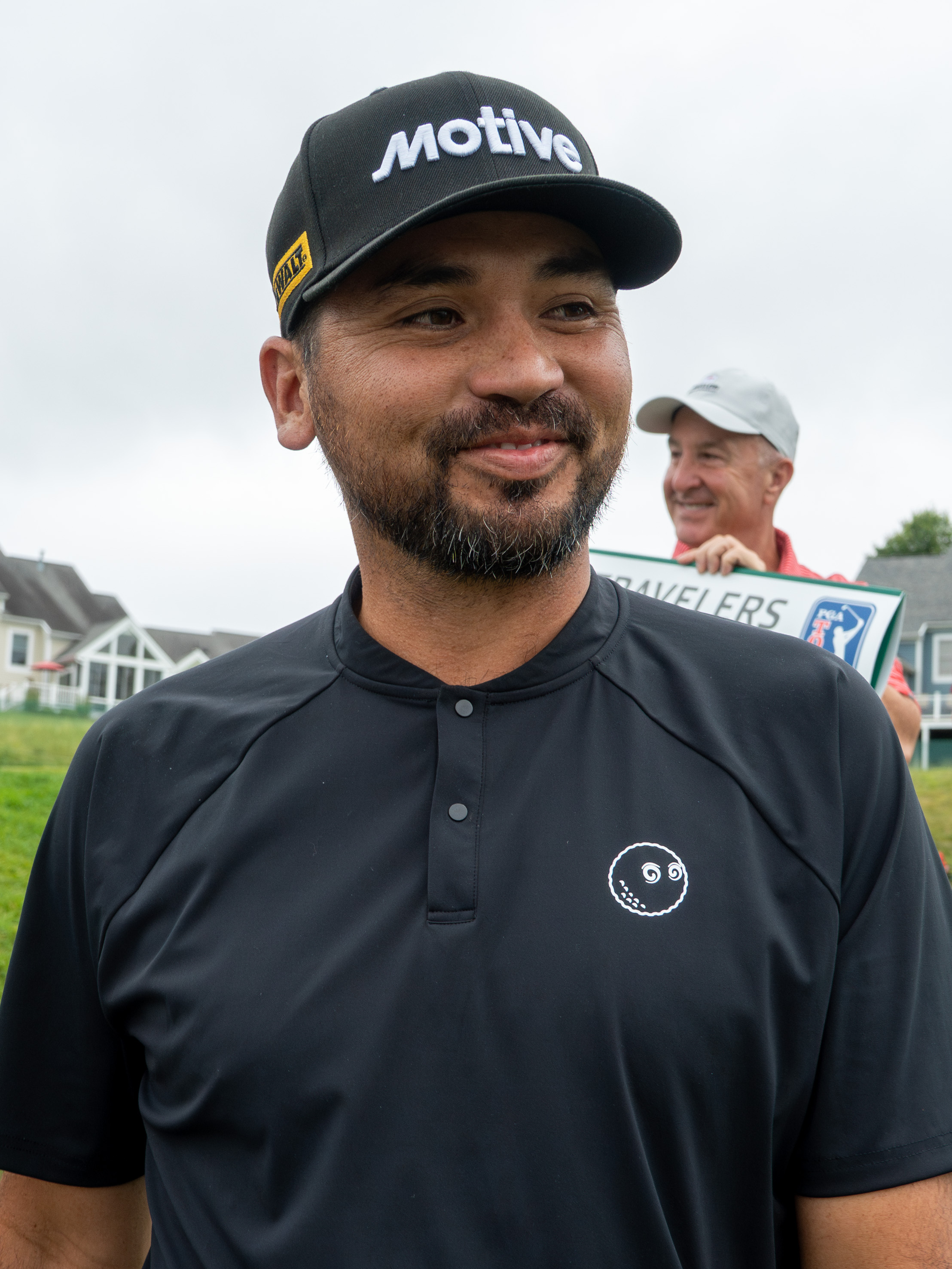
- Day at the 2025 Travelers Championship

Personal information
- Full name: Jason Anthony Day
- Nicknames: J.D., Jaydee, Jay Day
- Nationality: Australia
- Born: 12 November 1987 (age 39) Beaudesert, Queensland, Australia
- Height: 6 ft 0 in (183 cm)
- Weight: 88.5 kg (195 lb; 13.94 st)
- Spouse: Ellie Harvey (m. 2009)
- Children: 5

Career
- Sport: Golf
- Turned professional: 2006
- Current tour: PGA Tour
- Former tour: PGA Tour of Australasia
- Professional wins: 19
- Highest ranking: 1 (20 September 2015) (51 weeks)

Number of wins by tour
- PGA Tour: 13
- European Tour: 3
- Korn Ferry Tour: 1
- Other: 5

Best results in major championships (wins: 1)
- Masters Tournament: T2: 2011
- PGA Championship: Won: 2015
- U.S. Open: 2nd/T2: 2011, 2013
- The Open Championship: T2: 2023

Achievements and awards
- Greg Norman Medal: 2015, 2016
- Mark H. McCormack Award: 2016

Jason Anthony Day (born 12 November 1987) is an Australian professional golfer who plays on the PGA Tour, where he has won 13 times including the Players Championship in 2016 and the 2015 PGA Championship, his first major. He is a former world number 1 - having spent 51 weeks in that position.

== Early life ==
Day was born in Beaudesert, Queensland. His father, Alvin, was Irish Australian, and his mother, Dening, migrated from the Philippines to Australia in the early 1980s. He has two siblings, Yanna and Kim. His father took him to Beaudesert Golf Club and enrolled him as a junior member just after his sixth birthday. He was allowed to play six holes a day as a junior. At the age of eight his family moved to Rockhampton, and during this period he began to win events in the surrounding districts. Alvin Day died of stomach cancer when Jason was 12.

Day's mother sent him to Kooralbyn International School in the Gold Coast hinterland, which had a golf course attached. Later he went to Hills International College, where they have a golf academy, at the behest of his coach, Col Swatton, who had moved there when Kooralbyn school closed down. Day borrowed a book about Tiger Woods from his roommate, and it inspired him to improve his golf by practicing in the early morning, at lunch-time and in the evening. He used the book's reports of Woods' scores as his benchmark for improvement and as a reachable standard. His first big win was at the age of 13 in a 2000 Australian Masters junior event on the Gold Coast, where he won with scores of 87, 78, 76 and 76.

== Amateur career ==
As an amateur, Day was twice awarded the Australian Junior Order of Merit. He finished seventh and was the leading amateur at the Queensland Open. Day won the Australian Boys' Amateur in 2004. His amateur success extended to the United States, where he won the Boys 15–17 division at the 2004 Callaway World Junior Championship and was runner-up in the 2005 Porter Cup. He was a member of the Golf Australia National Squad.

In 2005, Day lost in a playoff at the Greater Building Society QLD PGA Championship; a professional event on the Von Nida Tour. He was beaten by Scott Gardiner on the fourth extra hole.

== Professional career ==
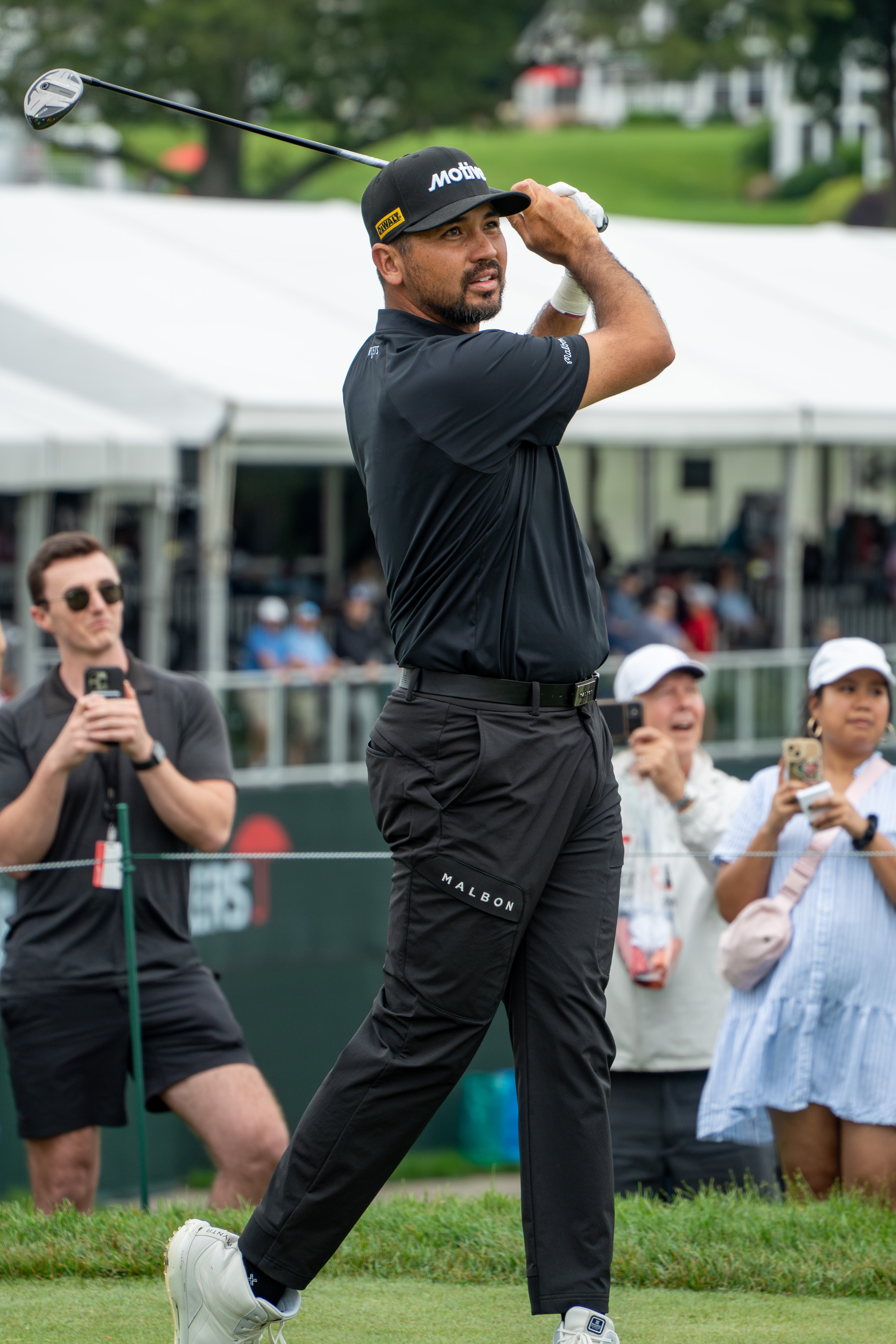
Jason Day at the 2025 Travelers Championship

=== 2006–10: Early career ===
Day turned professional in July 2006 after winning the Green Jacket at the NEC Master of the Amateurs, signing with TaylorMade and Adidas and immediately began playing PGA Tour events, principally through sponsors' exemptions. He made the cut in five of his first six PGA Tour events as a pro with a best finish of eleventh at the Reno-Tahoe Open and with official winnings of over $160,000. He entered PGA Tour qualifying, or Q-School. Placed in the second of three rounds, he tied for first in his section of the second round, advancing to the Q-School finals. However, in the six-round finals he played poorly, shooting fifteen shots higher than the score needed to qualify. Accordingly, he failed to earn his 2007 PGA Tour card but earned conditional status on the Nationwide Tour for 2007.

Day won his first Nationwide Tour event in July 2007 at the Legend Financial Group Classic, becoming the youngest man to win on any of the PGA Tour's three tours. The win jumped him to eighth on the Nationwide Tour's money list. He ended up finishing 5th on the money list to earn his PGA Tour card for 2008. He had a mediocre season, but had conditional status for 2009. A second-place finish at the Puerto Rico Open helped Day retain his card for 2010, and he finished 69th in the money list.

In May 2010, he became the youngest Australian to win a PGA Tour event, winning the HP Byron Nelson Championship. Day gained entry into his first ever major championship at the 2010 Open Championship after Greg Norman withdrew. Day went on to make the cut and finish in a tie for 60th place. In August 2010, Day made his first appearance at the PGA Championship, where a 66 on Saturday helped him to finish seven-under-par for the tournament and earn his first top-10 in a major. This run of form continued during the FedEx Cup playoff season, where Day enjoyed top-five finishes at the first two playoff events to qualify for the season-ending Tour Championship. He would go on to finish T17 at East Lake Golf Club and ended the 2010 season ranked 21st on the PGA Tour money list.

=== 2011–14: Contending in majors ===
At the 2011 Masters Tournament, Day birdied the last two holes, but came up two strokes short of eventual winner Charl Schwartzel. Day tied for second with Adam Scott and at −12 set the Masters record for the lowest score by a first-time participant. This was his best performance in a major championship, and throughout the final round Day was tied for the lead on a number of occasions before eventually finishing in a tie for second after Schwartzel made four consecutive birdies to win the tournament.

In June 2011, Day participated at Congressional for the 2011 U.S. Open, his maiden appearance in a U.S. Open. Following his successful run at the Masters, Day achieved consecutive second-place finishes in the majors, this time finishing alone in second, some eight strokes behind runaway leader Rory McIlroy. He shot the equal lowest round of the week on Saturday, a 65, to jump up the leaderboard into a tie for third after round three. On Sunday, although he did not challenge for the lead, he was the best of the rest of the field as the Open was dominated by wire-to-wire winner McIlroy.

As a result of his major performances, Day moved into the Official World Golf Ranking top-10 for the first time in his career at ninth. Despite not winning a tournament during 2011, Day ended the season ranked 9th on the PGA Tour money list. He contended in a major once again at the 2013 Masters Tournament when he shot rounds of 70 and 68 to take a one-shot lead over Fred Couples going to the weekend. In the third round, Day was tied for the lead through 16 holes but bogeyed the last two holes to shoot a 73 and finish two shots behind Brandt Snedeker and Ángel Cabrera. During the final round, Day got off to a quick start by going birdie-eagle to take a one-shot lead. Day would later go on to birdie 13, 14, and 15 to take a one-shot lead with three holes to play. However, he bogeyed 16 and 17 and just missed a birdie putt at 18 that would have tied the lead. He shot a 70 and finished two shots back in third place behind Adam Scott, and Cabrera.

Day finished as a runner-up for the third time in a major championship at the 2013 U.S. Open at Merion Golf Club. He finished in a tie for second alongside Phil Mickelson, two strokes behind Justin Rose. Day tied the lead with a birdie at the 10th, but bogeys at 11, 14, and 18 would prevent him from winning his first major championship. It was the second time in his career Day had finished as a runner-up at the U.S. Open, and Day is also the only player in 2013 to hold a lead on the back nine Sunday at both majors. He tied for the lowest cumulative score in all four majors in 2013, with fellow Australian Adam Scott at +2.

In February 2014, Day won his first World Golf Championship event, the WGC-Accenture Match Play Championship, after a final in which Victor Dubuisson won the last two holes to tie, then twice scrambled halves after missing greens at the extra holes before Day finally secured victory. The win lifted Day to fourth in the world rankings.

=== 2015: Major champion and World #1 ===
In February 2015, Day won his third PGA Tour event and his seventh title as a pro, winning the Farmers Insurance Open with a score of 279 (−9) after prevailing in a four-way playoff over Harris English, J. B. Holmes and Scott Stallings. He won at the second hole with a par while Holmes made bogey, after English and Stallings were eliminated at the first hole. The victory lifted Day back to fourth in the Official World Golf Ranking.

During the second round of the 2015 U.S. Open, Day collapsed on his 18th hole, the 9th hole on the course, having started the day on the 10th. He was very slow to get back up and was shaking and wobbly. It was later revealed that this was due to vertigo, a diagnosis Day had received from his doctor a month prior. However, the very next day, when he wasn't even sure if he would play, Day ended the third round tied for the lead. He finished the tournament tied for 9th. At the 2015 Open Championship at St Andrews, Day entered the final round as one of the 54-hole co-leaders and shot a bogey-free 70 to finish at 14-under-par and one stroke outside of the 3-way playoff. He had a putt for birdie on the 72nd hole to join the playoff but left it inches short. Day's tie for fourth, however, was his best finish at the Open Championship and was the sixth time he had finished in the top 5 of a major without winning one.

The following week at the RBC Canadian Open in Oakville, Canada, Day outlasted Bubba Watson and hometown favourite David Hearn to win the tournament, his second tour victory of the season and fourth overall. He made birdies on the last three holes in the final round to take a one-stroke victory. The 2015 PGA Championship was the final major championship of the 2015 season, hosted at the historic Whistling Straits. Jason Day produced an exceptional performance shooting rounds of 68, 67, 66 and 67 to best his nearest competitor, Jordan Spieth, by three strokes. This also preventing Spieth from winning a third major championship that season, although Spieth did dethrone Rory McIlroy to become the No. 1 ranked PGA player. Jason Day also set a new record that week becoming the first player in history to finish at 20-under-par in a major.

Day's hot streak continued with wins in The Barclays and the BMW Championship, two of the first three events in the FedEx Cup playoffs. As a result of the BMW Championship win, on 20 September 2015, Day gained the world number 1 ranking for the first time. Day entered the Tour Championship as the FedEx Cup leader, but he finished tied for tenth. Jordan Spieth would win the Tour Championship and the FedEx Cup as well as retaking the number one world ranking.

=== 2016 ===
After a missed cut in the defence of his Farmers Insurance Open title, Day claimed his first win of the year and eighth overall on the PGA Tour at the Arnold Palmer Invitational, where he beat Kevin Chappell by one shot. Day's victory was wire-to-wire having shot all four rounds under par (66-65-70-70) to finish with a −17 total. He birdied the 17th hole during the final round and had to get up and down from the bunker on the 72nd hole to hold on for the win. Day rose one place in the world rankings to number two, overtaking Rory McIlroy.

Just a week later, Day was in the winner's circle again at the WGC-Dell Match Play. He overtook Jordan Spieth to reach world No. 1 with his progression through to the semi-finals before beating Louis Oosthuizen 5 & 4 in the final in Austin, Texas for his ninth PGA Tour win.

He followed these victories up with a 4-stroke, wire-to-wire win at the 2016 Players Championship for his 10th career PGA Tour victory. Afterwards, he was hailed by world No.2 and nearest rival Jordan Spieth, while Adam Scott called his run of form 'Tiger-esque'.

In late June, Day announced that he would not be playing in the 2016 Olympic Games in Rio de Janeiro, citing concerns over the Zika virus.

As of July 2016, Day has earned over $33 million in prize money on the PGA Tour.

=== 2017 ===
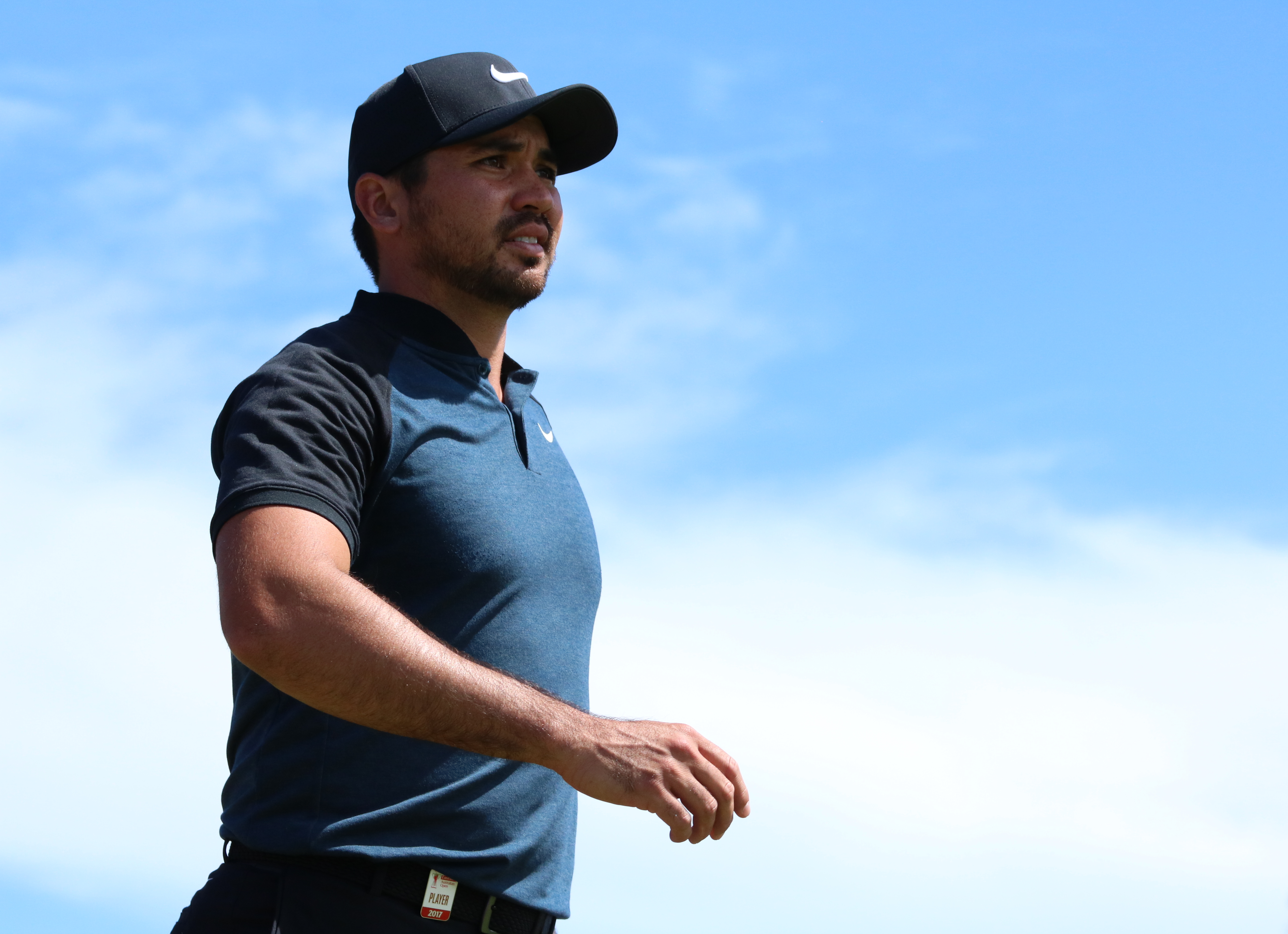
Day at the 2017 Australian Open.

On 1 January 2017, Nike announced that Day was joining Nike Golf ahead of the SBS Tournament of Champions at Kapalua the following week. It was announced that he will wear Nike clothes, shoes and gloves, following the brand's decision to stop making clubs and balls. Nike Golf unveiled a commercial to announce the multi-year sponsorship deal worth a reported $10m a year. Day was known to have the RBC logo on the collar of his shirts, but because Nike does not allow other sponsorships to be seen on their apparel, his sponsorship contract with RBC was not renewed. He continues to wear the Lexus logo on the left sleeve of his shirts, as he previously did before using Nike apparel.

On 13 September 2017, after a winless season, Day split from his caddie of 11 years – his entire professional career – and 'father figure' Colin Swatton. Day confirmed, though, that Swatton would remain as his swing coach.

=== 2018 ===
In January, Day won the Farmers Insurance Open, at Torrey Pines for a second time, for his 11th PGA Tour win and first in over eighteen months. He defeated Alex Norén and Ryan Palmer in a sudden-death playoff, that lasted six extra holes. Palmer had been eliminated by birdies on the first extra hole, but a further five holes were needed to separate Day and Norén. Play had to be suspended after the fifth extra hole, with the players coming back for a Monday finish. Day finally claimed the victory with a birdie on the sixth extra hole, after Norén had found water with his second shot to the green. The win lifted Day back into the world's top 10. In May, Day won the Wells Fargo Championship.

=== 2019 ===
Day continued to battle chronic back pain in 2019. After a decade of dealing with the problem, he was not afraid to try new remedies. "I was explaining the other day that I was blowing into balloons," Day told reporters at Quail Hollow in May 2019. "Which is crazy, because I haven't really trained at all this year because I've been so sore." The balloon therapy, which takes about 20–30 minutes twice a day, is supposed to help get his rib cage, hips and shoulders aligned, thereby alleviating pressure on his back. "Blowing into balloons, that's as far as I go," he said of the therapy. "Long story short, I try to keep my rib cage down. My rib cage gets up and then it blocks my mid back and then I can't really turn. So I get it from somewhere else and that's why my back flares up."

Following the 2019 U.S. Open, Day was being caddied by Tiger Woods' former caddie, Steve Williams. In June 2019, golf media reported that Williams was "the boss" of the player-caddie relationship and was telling Day what to do. "Pretty much when he asks you to do something you pretty much do it," Day said of Williams. Case in point: following an uninspiring round of even par on a rainy Thursday afternoon at the Travelers Championship, Day headed straight to the range at Williams' request. A day later, Day shot 63. "We've definitely been a lot more disciplined about going to the range and putting green, chipping green after the round and making sure we're staying on top of it, especially with our feels," said Day. "I've got a lot of work [to do] . . . [Steve] is very black and white." After Day missed the cut at The Northern Trust in August 2019, Day and Williams parted ways citing a 'disconnect between old school and new school'.

On 21 October 2019, Day won The Challenge: Japan Skins over Tiger Woods, Rory McIlroy and Hideki Matsuyama.

Day was originally a captain's pick for the International team of the Presidents Cup but withdrew with a back injury. He was replaced by An Byeong-hun.

=== 2023 ===
In May 2023, Day won the AT&T Byron Nelson by one shot, this was his first victory in five years. He also finished runner-up at the 2023 Open Championship, completing the "runner-up grand slam", as he finished runner-up at every major.

In December, Day won the inaugural Grant Thornton Invitational mixed team tournament with playing partner Lydia Ko.

== Personal life ==
Day married Ellie Harvey (of Lucas, Ohio), in 2009. The couple live in Westerville, Ohio, with their five children. On 17 December 2015, while watching a Cleveland Cavaliers game against the Oklahoma City Thunder at Quicken Loans Arena in Cleveland, Ellie sustained injuries after Cavaliers player LeBron James collided with her while attempting to retrieve a loose ball. She exited the arena on a stretcher with her head immobilized and was admitted to a nearby hospital.

Day had previously lived in Orlando, Florida, and Fort Worth, Texas.

In November 2013, eight of Day's relatives in the Philippines, including his grandmother, died during Typhoon Haiyan.

== Awards and honors ==
- In 2015, Day was bestowed The Don Award by the Sport Australia Hall of Fame.
- In 2015, he earned the inaugural Greg Norman Medal, given to the Australian golfer who performs best over the course of the year.
- In 2015, Day was selected as the Queensland Sports Star of the Year.
- In 2016, he earned the Mark H. McCormack Award, given to the golfer who spent the most weeks atop the Official World Golf Rankings that year.
- In 2016, Day earned the Greg Norman Medal again.

== Amateur wins ==
this list is incomplete

- 2003 Adina Watches Junior Tournament
- 2004 Queensland Amateur, Australian Boys' Amateur, New Zealand Under 19 Championship, Callaway World Junior Championship (Boys 15–17), ADINA Watches Junior Tournament
- 2005 Victorian Junior Masters, South Australian Junior, Queensland Junior
- 2006 Australian Amateur Stroke Play, Master of the Amateurs, Queensland Amateur

== Professional wins (19) ==
=== PGA Tour wins (13) ===
Legend
Major championships (1)
Players Championships (1)
World Golf Championships (2)
FedEx Cup playoff events (2)
Other PGA Tour (7)

| No. | Date | Tournament | Winning score | To par | Margin of victory | Runner(s)-up |
|---|---|---|---|---|---|---|
| 1 | 23 May 2010 | HP Byron Nelson Championship | 66-65-67-72=270 | −10 | 2 strokes | (United States) Blake Adams, (United States) Brian Gay, (United States) Jeff Overton |
| 2 | 23 Feb 2014 | WGC-Accenture Match Play Championship | 23 holes | | | (France) Victor Dubuisson |
| 3 | 8 Feb 2015 | Farmers Insurance Open | 73-65-71-70=279 | −9 | Playoff | (United States) Harris English, (United States) J. B. Holmes, (United States) Scott Stallings |
| 4 | 26 Jul 2015 | RBC Canadian Open | 68-66-69-68=271 | −17 | 1 stroke | (United States) Bubba Watson |
| 5 | 16 Aug 2015 | PGA Championship | 68-67-66-67=268 | −20 | 3 strokes | (United States) Jordan Spieth |
| 6 | 30 Aug 2015 | The Barclays | 68-68-63-62=261 | −19 | 6 strokes | (Sweden) Henrik Stenson |
| 7 | 20 Sep 2015 | BMW Championship | 61-63-69-69=262 | −22 | 6 strokes | (United States) Daniel Berger |
| 8 | 20 Mar 2016 | Arnold Palmer Invitational | 66-65-70-70=271 | −17 | 1 stroke | (United States) Kevin Chappell |
| 9 | 27 Mar 2016 | WGC-Dell Match Play (2) | 5 and 4 | | | (South Africa) Louis Oosthuizen |
| 10 | 15 May 2016 | The Players Championship | 63-66-73-71=273 | −15 | 4 strokes | (United States) Kevin Chappell |
| 11 | 29 Jan 2018 | Farmers Insurance Open (2) | 73-64-71-70=278 | −10 | Playoff | (Sweden) Alex Norén, (United States) Ryan Palmer |
| 12 | 6 May 2018 | Wells Fargo Championship | 69-67-67-69=272 | −12 | 2 strokes | (United States) Nick Watney, (United States) Aaron Wise |
| 13 | 14 May 2023 | AT&T Byron Nelson (2) | 64-69-66-62=261 | −23 | 1 stroke | (United States) Austin Eckroat, (South Korea) Kim Si-woo |

PGA Tour playoff record (2–1)

| No. | Year | Tournament | Opponent(s) | Result |
|---|---|---|---|---|
| 1 | 2015 | Farmers Insurance Open | (United States) Harris English, (United States) J. B. Holmes, (United States) Scott Stallings | Won with par on second extra hole English and Stallings eliminated by birdie on first hole |
| 2 | 2017 | AT&T Byron Nelson | (United States) Billy Horschel | Lost to par on first extra hole |
| 3 | 2018 | Farmers Insurance Open | (Sweden) Alex Norén, (United States) Ryan Palmer | Won with birdie on sixth extra hole Palmer eliminated by birdie on first hole |

=== Nationwide Tour wins (1) ===
| No. | Date | Tournament | Winning score | To par | Margin of victory | Runner-up |
|---|---|---|---|---|---|---|
| 1 | 8 Jul 2007 | Legend Financial Group Classic | 68-66-67-67=268 | −16 | 1 stroke | (Australia) Scott Gardiner |

=== Other wins (5) ===
| No. | Date | Tournament | Winning score | To par | Margin of victory | Runner(s)-up |
|---|---|---|---|---|---|---|
| 1 | 24 Nov 2013 | ISPS Handa World Cup of Golf (with (Australia) Adam Scott) | 143-138-134-136=551 | −17 | 10 strokes | United States − Matt Kuchar and Kevin Streelman |
| 2 | 24 Nov 2013 | World Cup of Golf Individual Trophy | 68-70-66-70=274 | −10 | 2 strokes | (Denmark) Thomas Bjørn |
| 3 | 13 Dec 2014 | Franklin Templeton Shootout (with (United States) Cameron Tringale) | 55-64-65=184 | −32 | 1 stroke | (United States) Harris English and (United States) Matt Kuchar |
| 4 | 21 Oct 2019 | MGM Resorts The Challenge: Japan Skins | $210,000 | | $150,000 | (Northern Ireland) Rory McIlroy, (United States) Tiger Woods |
| 5 | 10 Dec 2023 | Grant Thornton Invitational (with (New Zealand) Lydia Ko) | 58-66-66=190 | −26 | 1 stroke | (Canada) Corey Conners and (Canada) Brooke Henderson |

== Major championships ==
=== Wins (1) ===
| Year | Championship | 54 holes | Winning score | Margin | Runner-up |
|---|---|---|---|---|---|
| 2015 | PGA Championship | 2 shot lead | −20 (68-67-66-67=268) | 3 strokes | (United States) Jordan Spieth |

=== Results timeline ===
Results not in chronological order in 2020.

| Tournament | 2010 | 2011 | 2012 | 2013 | 2014 | 2015 | 2016 | 2017 | 2018 |
|---|---|---|---|---|---|---|---|---|---|
| Masters Tournament | | T2 | WD | 3 | T20 | T28 | T10 | T22 | T20 |
| U.S. Open | | 2 | T59 | T2 | T4 | T9 | T8 | CUT | CUT |
| The Open Championship | T60 | T30 | | T32 | T58 | T4 | T22 | T27 | T17 |
| PGA Championship | T10 | CUT | CUT | T8 | T15 | 1 | 2 | T9 | T19 |

| Tournament | 2019 | 2020 | 2021 | 2022 | 2023 | 2024 | 2025 | 2026 |
|---|---|---|---|---|---|---|---|---|
| Masters Tournament | T5 | CUT | CUT | | T39 | T30 | T8 | T12 |
| PGA Championship | T23 | T4 | T44 | T55 | CUT | T43 | CUT | T65 |
| U.S. Open | T21 | T38 | | | CUT | CUT | T23 | WD |
| The Open Championship | CUT | NT | CUT | | T2 | T13 | CUT | CUT |

Win
Top 10
Did not play

CUT = missed the half-way cut
WD = withdrew
"T" = tied
NT = no tournament due to COVID-19 pandemic

=== Summary ===
| Tournament | Wins | 2nd | 3rd | Top-5 | Top-10 | Top-25 | Events | Cuts made |
|---|---|---|---|---|---|---|---|---|
| Masters Tournament | 0 | 1 | 1 | 3 | 5 | 9 | 15 | 12 |
| PGA Championship | 1 | 1 | 0 | 3 | 6 | 9 | 17 | 13 |
| U.S. Open | 0 | 2 | 0 | 3 | 5 | 7 | 14 | 9 |
| The Open Championship | 0 | 1 | 0 | 2 | 2 | 5 | 14 | 10 |
| Totals | 1 | 5 | 1 | 11 | 18 | 30 | 60 | 44 |

- Most consecutive cuts made – 17 (2013 Masters – 2017 Masters)
- Longest streak of top-10s – 5 (2015 U.S. Open – 2016 U.S. Open)

== The Players Championship ==
=== Wins (1) ===
| Year | Championship | 54 holes | Winning score | Margin | Runner-up |
|---|---|---|---|---|---|
| 2016 | The Players Championship | 4 shot lead | −15 (63-66-73-71=273) | 4 strokes | (United States) Kevin Chappell |

=== Results timeline ===
| Tournament | 2010 | 2011 | 2012 | 2013 | 2014 | 2015 | 2016 | 2017 | 2018 | 2019 |
|---|---|---|---|---|---|---|---|---|---|---|
| The Players Championship | CUT | T6 | CUT | T19 | | CUT | 1 | T60 | T5 | T8 |

| Tournament | 2020 | 2021 | 2022 | 2023 | 2024 | 2025 | 2026 |
|---|---|---|---|---|---|---|---|
| The Players Championship | C | T35 | CUT | T19 | T35 | | T59 |

Win
Top 10
Did not play

CUT = missed the halfway cut
"T" indicates a tie for a place
C = cancelled after the first round due to the COVID-19 pandemic

== World Golf Championships ==
=== Wins (2) ===
| Year | Championship | 54 holes | Winning score | Margin | Runner-up |
|---|---|---|---|---|---|
| 2014 | WGC-Accenture Match Play Championship | n/a | 23 holes | | (France) Victor Dubuisson |
| 2016 | WGC-Dell Match Play (2) | n/a | 5 and 4 | | (South Africa) Louis Oosthuizen |

=== Results timeline ===
Results not in chronological order before 2015.

| Tournament | 2010 | 2011 | 2012 | 2013 | 2014 | 2015 | 2016 | 2017 | 2018 | 2019 | 2020 | 2021 | 2022 | 2023 |
|---|---|---|---|---|---|---|---|---|---|---|---|---|---|---|
| Championship | | T45 | T20 | T33 | | T31 | T23 | | | | | T18 | | |
| Match Play | | R16 | R32 | 3 | 1 | T52 | 1 | T58 | T36 | T61 | NT^{1} | T42 | | QF |
| Invitational | T22 | T4 | T29 | T53 | WD | T12 | T3 | T24 | T10 | T40 | T6 | | | |
| Champions | | | | | | | | T11 | T11 | | NT^{1} | NT^{1} | NT^{1} | |

^{1}Cancelled due to COVID-19 pandemic

Win
Top 10
Did not play

QF, R16, R32, R64 = Round in which player lost in match play
WD = withdrew
NT = No tournament
"T" = Tied
Note that the Championship and Invitational were discontinued from 2022. The Champions was discontinued from 2023.

== PGA Tour career summary ==
| Season | Starts | Cuts made | Wins (majors) | 2nd | 3rd | Top-10 | Top-25 | Earnings ($) | Money list rank |
|---|---|---|---|---|---|---|---|---|---|
| 2006 | 7 | 5 | 0 | 0 | 0 | 0 | 2 | 174,508 | n/a |
| 2008 | 28 | 13 | 0 | 0 | 0 | 2 | 6 | 767,393 | 136 |
| 2009 | 18 | 14 | 0 | 1 | 0 | 2 | 7 | 1,251,219 | 69 |
| 2010 | 24 | 18 | 1 | 1 | 0 | 5 | 11 | 2,904,327 | 21 |
| 2011 | 21 | 18 | 0 | 2 | 1 | 10 | 12 | 3,962,647 | 9 |
| 2012 | 17 | 13 | 0 | 0 | 0 | 4 | 8 | 1,143,233 | 88 |
| 2013 | 21 | 21 | 0 | 1 | 2 | 7 | 12 | 3,625,030 | 12 |
| 2014 | 15 | 14 | 1 | 2 | 0 | 6 | 9 | 3,789,574 | 16 |
| 2015 | 20 | 18 | 5 (1) | 0 | 1 | 11 | 15 | 9,403,330 | 2 |
| 2016 | 20 | 19 | 3 | 1 | 1 | 10 | 16 | 8,045,112 | 2 |
| 2017 | 20 | 16 | 0 | 1 | 0 | 5 | 12 | 2,978,181 | 28 |
| 2018 | 20 | 18 | 2 | 1 | 0 | 5 | 15 | 5,087,461 | 10 |
| 2019 | 21 | 15 | 0 | 0 | 0 | 6 | 11 | 2,637,480 | 35 |
| 2020 | 17 | 10 | 0 | 0 | 0 | 5 | 7 | 1,943,898 | 42 |
| 2021 | 22 | 13 | 0 | 0 | 0 | 3 | 6 | 1,291,234 | 102 |
| 2022 | 19 | 12 | 0 | 0 | 1 | 2 | 5 | 1,086,460 | 117 |
| 2023 | 24 | 18 | 1 | 1 | 0 | 8 | 13 | 6,922,758 | 18 |
| Career | 334 | 255 | 13 (1) | 11 | 6 | 91 | 169 | 57,013,745 | 9 |

== Team appearances ==
Amateur

- Australian Men's Interstate Teams Matches (representing Queensland): 2004 (winners), 2005

Professional

- Presidents Cup (representing the International team): 2011, 2013, 2015, 2017, 2024
- World Cup (representing Australia): 2013 (winners)
- Wendy's 3-Tour Challenge (representing PGA Tour): 2012 (winners), 2013

== See also ==
- List of men's major championships winning golfers
- 2007 Nationwide Tour graduates
