= 2014 in golf =

This article summarizes the highlights of professional and amateur golf in the year 2014.

== Men's professional golf ==
Major championships

- 10–13 April: Masters Tournament – Bubba Watson won by three strokes to claim his second Masters championship.
- 12–15 June: U.S. Open – Martin Kaymer won by eight strokes, becoming the first German player to win the U.S. Open, and the first player to win the Players Championship and the U.S. Open in the same year. This was his second major victory.
- 17–20 July: The Open Championship – Rory McIlroy won by two strokes over Rickie Fowler and Sergio García. It was his third career major championship, and his first Open Championship. With the win, he became the fourth player ever of 25 years old or under to have won at least three majors.
- 7–10 August: PGA Championship – Rory McIlroy won by one stroke over Phil Mickelson. It was his fourth career major and his second PGA Championship. It was also his third win in three starts, dating back to the Open Championship three weeks earlier.

World Golf Championships

- 19–23 February: WGC-Accenture Match Play Championship – Australian Jason Day won his first WGC event, beating Victor Dubuisson of France on the 23rd hole.
- 6–9 March WGC-Cadillac Championship – Patrick Reed won his first WGC event, winning by one stroke. At age 23, he was the youngest ever winner of a WGC event.
- 31 July – 3 August: WGC-Bridgestone Invitational – Rory McIlroy won, finishing two strokes ahead of Sergio García. It was his first WGC victory, and his first win on American soil in nearly two years.
- 6–9 November: WGC-HSBC Champions – Bubba Watson won, defeating Tim Clark on the first playoff hole. It was his first WGC victory, and his first victory outside of the United States.

FedEx Cup playoff events - see 2014 FedEx Cup Playoffs

- 21–24 August: The Barclays – Hunter Mahan won by two strokes over Stuart Appleby, Jason Day, and Cameron Tringale. The win vaulted him from 62nd to 1st in the FedEx Cup standings.
- 29 August – 1 September: Deutsche Bank Championship – Chris Kirk won by two shots over Russell Henley, Billy Horschel, and Geoff Ogilvy.
- 4–7 September: BMW Championship – Billy Horschel won by two strokes over Bubba Watson.
- 11–14 September: Tour Championship – Billy Horschel won by three strokes over Jim Furyk and Rory McIlroy. His second consecutive playoff win also earned him the FedEx Cup.

Other leading PGA Tour events

- 8–11 May: The Players Championship – German Martin Kaymer won, finishing one stroke ahead of Jim Furyk.

For a complete list of PGA Tour results see 2014 PGA Tour.

Leading European Tour events

- 22–25 May: BMW PGA Championship – Northern Irishman Rory McIlroy birdied the 18th hole, and won by one stroke over Irishman Shane Lowry, who also birdied the 18th hole.
- 15–19 October: Volvo World Match Play Championship – Finn Mikko Ilonen defeated Swede Henrik Stenson 3 & 1 in the championship match.
- 30 October – 2 November: BMW Masters – Marcel Siem won in a playoff with Ross Fisher and Alexander Lévy.
- 13–16 November: Turkish Airlines Open – Brooks Koepka won from the clubhouse by one stroke over Ian Poulter, who failed to make birdie at the par-5 18th hole. It was Koepka's first career European Tour victory.
- 20–23 November: DP World Tour Championship, Dubai – Henrik Stenson won by 2 strokes over Victor Dubuisson, Rory McIlroy, and Justin Rose. It was his second straight DP World Tour Championship victory.

For a complete list of European Tour results see 2014 European Tour.

Team events

- 28–30 March: EurAsia Cup – The first EurAsia Cup ended in a 10–10 tie with the European and Asian teams sharing the Cup.
- 26–28 September: Ryder Cup – Team Europe defeated Team USA by a score of 16½ – 11½. It was the third consecutive Ryder Cup victory for Europe, and also Europe's fifth consecutive home victory in the Ryder Cup.

Tour leaders

- PGA Tour – (Northern Ireland) Rory McIlroy (US$8,280,096)
  - This total does not include FedEx Cup bonuses.
- European Tour – (Northern Ireland) Rory McIlroy (7,149,503 points)
  - This total includes the US$1.25 million (€1.0 million) bonus for winning the Race to Dubai.
- Japan Golf Tour – Koumei Oda (¥137,318,693)
- Asian Tour – (United States) David Lipsky (US$713,901)
- PGA Tour of Australasia – (Australia) Greg Chalmers (A$254,525)
- Sunshine Tour – (South Africa) Thomas Aiken (R4,057,642)

Awards

- PGA Tour
  - FedEx Cup – (United States) Billy Horschel won the FedEx Cup after winning the final two playoff events, the BMW Championship and Tour Championship.
  - PGA Player of the Year – (Northern Ireland) Rory McIlroy
  - Player of the Year (Jack Nicklaus Trophy) – (Northern Ireland) Rory McIlroy
  - Leading money winner (Arnold Palmer Award) – (Northern Ireland) Rory McIlroy (US$8,280,096)
  - Vardon Trophy – (Northern Ireland) Rory McIlroy
  - Byron Nelson Award – (Northern Ireland) Rory McIlroy
  - Rookie of the Year – (United States) Chesson Hadley
  - Payne Stewart Award – (England) Nick Faldo
- European Tour
  - Golfer of the Year – (Northern Ireland) Rory McIlroy
  - Rookie of the Year – (United States) Brooks Koepka
- Web.com Tour
  - Player of the Year – (Mexico) Carlos Ortiz

Results from other tours

- 2014 Asian Tour
- 2014 PGA Tour of Australasia
- 2014 Challenge Tour
- 2014 Japan Golf Tour
- 2014 OneAsia Tour
- 2014 PGA Tour Canada
- 2014 PGA Tour China
- 2014 PGA Tour Latinoamérica
- 2014 Sunshine Tour
- 2014 Web.com Tour

Other happenings

- 11 May: Ian MacGregor, caddie for Alastair Forsyth, died of an apparent heart attack during the final round of the Madeira Islands Open - Portugal - BPI, a tournament dual-sanctioned by the European Tour and the Challenge Tour.
- 18 May: For the second time, Miguel Ángel Jiménez extended his own record as the oldest golfer to win on the European Tour, winning the Open de España at age 50 years, 133 days.
- 18 May: Adam Scott became the world's number one golfer.
- 4 August: Rory McIlroy regained the world number one position, last held in March 2013.

== Women's professional golf ==
LPGA majors

- 3–6 April: Kraft Nabisco Championship – Lexi Thompson won by three strokes over Michelle Wie; it was her first career major win, and her fourth career LPGA Tour win.
- 19–22 June: U.S. Women's Open – Michelle Wie won by two strokes over Stacy Lewis; it was her first career major win, and her fourth career LPGA Tour win. It was also her first win on the U.S. mainland (her previous LPGA Tour wins had occurred in Mexico, Canada, and her home state of Hawaii).
- 10–13 July: Ricoh Women's British Open – Mo Martin won by one stroke over Shanshan Feng and Suzann Pettersen. It was her first major win, and also her first LPGA Tour win.
- 14–17 August: Wegmans LPGA Championship – Inbee Park successfully defended her LPGA Championship title, defeating Brittany Lincicome on the first hole of a playoff. It was her second LPGA Championship, and her fifth major title overall.
- 11–14 September: The Evian Championship – Kim Hyo-joo won by one stroke over Karrie Webb, with Kim making birdie and Webb making bogey at the 72nd hole. It was Kim's first LPGA Tour victory.

Additional LPGA Tour events

- 20–23 November: CME Group Tour Championship – Lydia Ko won in a playoff over Julieta Granada and Carlota Ciganda. It was her eighth professional victory, and fifth LPGA Tour victory. Her performance also secured her the $1,000,000 bonus for winning the Race to the CME Globe.

For a complete list of LPGA Tour results, see 2014 LPGA Tour.
For a complete list of Ladies European Tour results see 2014 Ladies European Tour.

Team events

- 24–27 July: International Crown – Spain swept all four of its singles matches and won with 15 points, four points better than Sweden.

Money list leaders

- LPGA Tour – (United States) Stacy Lewis (US$2,539,039)
- LPGA of Japan Tour – (South Korea) Ahn Sun-ju (¥153,075,741)
- Ladies European Tour – (England) Charley Hull (€263,097)
- LPGA of Korea Tour – (South Korea) Kim Hyo-joo (₩1,208,978,590)
- Ladies Asian Golf Tour – (Thailand) Pornanong Phatlum (US$82,500)
- ALPG Tour – (Australia) Karrie Webb (A$199,242) (2013/14 season)
- Symetra Tour – (United States) Marissa Steen (US$75,348)

Awards

- LPGA:
  - Race to the CME Globe – (New Zealand) Lydia Ko
  - Player of the Year – (United States) Stacy Lewis
  - Rookie of the Year – (New Zealand) Lydia Ko
  - Vare Trophy – (United States) Stacy Lewis
- LET:
  - Player of the Year –
  - Rookie of the Year – (Wales) Amy Boulden
- LPGA of Japan Tour Player of the Year – (South Korea) Ahn Sun-ju

Other tour results

- 2014 Symetra Tour
- 2014 Ladies Asian Golf Tour
- 2014 LPGA of Korea Tour

Other happenings

- 8 January – The LPGA announced a renamed CME Group Tour Championship and season-long points race, the "Race to the CME Globe". The winner of the Race will receive a $1 million bonus. The Race is similar to the PGA Tour's FedEx Cup and the European Tour's Race to Dubai.
- 29 May – The LPGA announced that the LPGA Championship will become the "KPMG Women's PGA Championship" in 2015 and be conducted by the PGA of America.
- 11 September – On her way to the Evian Championship title, Kim Hyo-joo shot 61 in the first round, the lowest round ever in a major championship for either sex.
- 12 October - With her win at Hite Jinro Championship, Kim Hyo-joo became the first LPGA of Korea Tour player to earn more than 1 billion KRW during one season.
- 18 November – The LPGA announces that the first major of its season will be renamed from the Kraft Nabisco Championship to the ANA Inspiration effective with the 2015 edition. The new title sponsor is All Nippon Airways, replacing the former Kraft Foods (now Mondelēz International) and its Nabisco subsidiary, which had sponsored the tournament since 1982.

== Senior men's professional golf ==
Senior majors

- 15–18 May: Regions Tradition - Kenny Perry won his third Champions Tour major and his first Regions Tradition, winning by one stroke over Mark Calcavecchia. Perry became the first golfer to win three consecutive Champions Tour major starts since Gary Player in 1987–88 (in 2013, Perry won the Senior Players Championship and U.S. Senior Open before skipping The Senior Open Championship).
- 22–25 May: Senior PGA Championship – Colin Montgomerie won his first major of any kind, finishing four strokes ahead of Tom Watson. It is his first win on U.S. soil.
- 26–29 June: Constellation Senior Players Championship - German Bernhard Langer won his first Senior Players Championship and his third career senior major, by defeating Jeff Sluman in a playoff. It was also his 21st career Champions Tour victory, as well as his 92nd career professional victory.
- 10–13 July: U.S. Senior Open – Colin Montgomerie won his second major of the 2014 season, defeating Gene Sauers in a 3-hole aggregate playoff.
- 24–27 July: The Senior Open Championship – German Bernhard Langer won his second major of the year by a record 13 strokes over Colin Montgomerie.

Full results

- 2014 Champions Tour
- 2014 European Senior Tour

Money list leaders

- Champions Tour – German Bernhard Langer topped the money list for the sixth time (third consecutive) with earnings of US$3,074,189. This surpassed Hale Irwin's 2002 record for single-season winnings.
- European Senior Tour – Colin Montgomerie topped the Order of Merit with earnings of €624,543.

Awards

- Champions Tour
  - Charles Schwab Cup – (Germany) Bernhard Langer
  - Player of the Year – (Germany) Bernhard Langer
  - Rookie of the Year – (United States) Scott Dunlap
  - Leading money winner (Arnold Palmer Award) – (Germany) Bernhard Langer
  - Lowest stroke average (Byron Nelson Award) – (Germany) Bernhard Langer

Other happenings

- 16 August: Kevin Sutherland, at the second round of the Dick's Sporting Goods Open, became the first person on the Champions Tour to shoot a 59, going −13 on the par-72 course.

== Amateur golf ==
- 20–23 May: NCAA Division I Women's Golf Championships – Duke won its sixth team title and Doris Chen of Southern California claimed the individual title.
- 23–28 May: NCAA Division I Men's Golf Championships – Alabama won its second consecutive team title, and Cameron Wilson of Stanford claimed the individual title.
- 6–8 June: Curtis Cup – The United States defeated Great Britain and Ireland by a score of 13–7, giving the United States team five consecutive home victories in the competition.
- 16–21 June: The Amateur Championship – Bradley Neil of Scotland defeated Zander Lombard of South Africa in the final match by a score of 2 & 1.
- 24–28 June: British Ladies Amateur – Emily Kristine Pedersen of Denmark defeated Leslie Cloots of Belgium in the final match by a score of 3 & 1.
- 4–10 August: U.S. Women's Amateur – American Kristen Gillman defeated Canada's Brooke Henderson, 2 up, in the final.
- 11–17 August: U.S. Amateur – South Korean Gunn Yang defeated Canada's Corey Conners in the final match by a score of 2 & 1.
- 3–6 September Espirito Santo Trophy – Australia beat Canada by two strokes to claim its third trophy.
- 10–13 September Eisenhower Trophy – The United States won by two strokes over Canada, their 15th win in 29 playings.
- 21–26 October: Asia-Pacific Amateur Championship – Australian Antonio Murdaca won by seven strokes.

Other happenings

- 22 January – Augusta National Golf Club, The R&A, and the USGA jointly announced the creation of a new major men's amateur tournament, the Latin America Amateur Championship. The tournament, set to hold its first edition in January 2015, will be open to amateurs from Mexico, the Caribbean, Central America, and South America. The winner will receive invitations to the Masters, The Amateur Championship, the U.S. Amateur, and any other USGA event for which he is eligible apart from the U.S. Open. In addition, the winner and runner-up will receive automatic entry to final qualifying for the U.S. Open and The Open Championship.

== World Golf Hall of Fame inductees ==
Changes to the induction process were announced in March 2014. The following individuals were announced as new inductees on 15 October 2014, with induction occurring on 13 July 2015 in conjunction with the 2015 Open Championship at St Andrews:

- (England) Laura Davies (Female Competitor)
- (Australia) David Graham (Male Competitor)
- (United States) Mark O'Meara (Male Competitor)
- (United States) A. W. Tillinghast (Lifetime Achievement)

== Deaths ==
- 30 January – Danielle Downey (born 1980), LPGA and Futures Tour player
- 21 March – Jack Fleck (born 1921), PGA Tour player, best known for defeating Ben Hogan in a playoff at the 1955 U.S. Open
- 12 April – Beverly Hanson (born 1924), three-time LPGA Tour major winner
- 2 July – Errie Ball (born 1910), oldest living player from first Masters Tournament
- 22 August – Jack Harris (born 1922), life member of PGA Australia
- 12 September – Hugh Royer Jr. (born 1936), PGA Tour player. He won the 1970 Western Open
- 9 November – Rubén Alvarez (born 1961), European Tour player from Argentina
- 6 December – Fred Hawkins (born 1923), PGA Tour winner, runner-up at 1958 Masters Tournament
- 21 December – Tom Nieporte (born 1928), three-time PGA Tour winner

== Table of results ==
This table summarizes all the results referred to above in date order.

Dates	Tournament	Status or tour	Winner
19–23 Feb	WGC-Accenture Match Play Championship	World Golf Championships	(Australia) Jason Day
6–9 Mar	WGC-Cadillac Championship	World Golf Championships	(United States) Patrick Reed
28–30 Mar	EurAsia Cup	Europe v Asia men's professional team event	Tied
3–6 Apr	Kraft Nabisco Championship	LPGA major	(United States) Lexi Thompson
10–13 Apr	Masters Tournament	Men's major	(United States) Bubba Watson
8–11 May	The Players Championship	PGA Tour	(Germany) Martin Kaymer
15–18 May	Regions Tradition	Senior major	(United States) Kenny Perry
20–23 May	NCAA Division I Women's Golf Championships	U.S. college championship	Duke / Doris Chen
22–25 May	BMW PGA Championship	European Tour	(Northern Ireland) Rory McIlroy
22–25 May	Senior PGA Championship	Senior major	(Scotland) Colin Montgomerie
23–28 May	NCAA Division I Men's Golf Championships	U.S. college championship	Alabama / Cameron Wilson
6–8 Jun	Curtis Cup	Amateur women's team tournament	United States
12–15 Jun	U.S. Open	Men's major	(Germany) Martin Kaymer
16–21 Jun	The Amateur Championship	Amateur men's individual tournament	(Scotland) Bradley Neil
19–22 Jun	U.S. Women's Open	LPGA major	(United States) Michelle Wie
24–28 Jun	British Ladies Amateur	Amateur women's individual tournament	(Denmark) Emily Kristine Pedersen
26–29 Jun	Constellation Senior Players Championship	Senior major	(Germany) Bernhard Langer
10–13 Jul	U.S. Senior Open	Senior major	(Scotland) Colin Montgomerie
10–13 Jul	Ricoh Women's British Open	LPGA Tour and Ladies European Tour major	(United States) Mo Martin
17–20 Jul	The Open Championship	Men's major	(Northern Ireland) Rory McIlroy
24–27 Jul	International Crown	LPGA Tour team event	Spain
24–27 Jul	The Senior Open Championship	Senior major	(Germany) Bernhard Langer
31 Jul – 3 Aug	WGC-Bridgestone Invitational	World Golf Championships	(Northern Ireland) Rory McIlroy
4–10 Aug	U.S. Women's Amateur	Amateur women's individual tournament	(United States) Kristen Gillman
7–10 Aug	PGA Championship	Men's major	(Northern Ireland) Rory McIlroy
14–17 Aug	Wegmans LPGA Championship	LPGA major	(South Korea) Inbee Park
11–17 Aug	U.S. Amateur	Amateur men's individual tournament	(South Korea) Gunn Yang
21–24 Aug	The Barclays	PGA Tour FedEx Cup playoff	(United States) Hunter Mahan
29 Aug – 1 Sep	Deutsche Bank Championship	PGA Tour FedEx Cup playoff	(United States) Chris Kirk
3–6 Sep	Espirito Santo Trophy	Women's amateur team event	Australia
4–7 Sep	BMW Championship	PGA Tour FedEx Cup playoff	(United States) Billy Horschel
10–13 Sep	Eisenhower Trophy	Men's amateur team event	United States
11–14 Sep	The Evian Championship	LPGA Tour and Ladies European Tour major	(South Korea) Kim Hyo-joo
11–14 Sep	The Tour Championship	PGA Tour FedEx Cup playoff	(United States) Billy Horschel
26–28 Sep	Ryder Cup	United States v. Europe men's professional team event	Team Europe
21–26 Oct	Asia-Pacific Amateur Championship	Amateur men's individual tournament	(Australia) Antonio Murdaca
6–9 Nov	WGC-HSBC Champions	World Golf Championships	(United States) Bubba Watson
20–23 Nov	DP World Tour Championship, Dubai	European Tour	(Sweden) Henrik Stenson
20–23 Nov	CME Group Tour Championship	LPGA Tour	(New Zealand) Lydia Ko

The following biennial events will next be played in 2015: Solheim Cup, Walker Cup, Presidents Cup, Seve Trophy, World Cup.
