= 2014 European Tour =

Golf tour season

2014 European Tour season
- Duration: 21 November 2013 – 23 November 2014
- Number of official events: 49
- Most wins: (Northern Ireland) Rory McIlroy (4)
- Race to Dubai: (Northern Ireland) Rory McIlroy
- Golfer of the Year: (Northern Ireland) Rory McIlroy
- Players' Player of the Year: (Northern Ireland) Rory McIlroy
- Sir Henry Cotton Rookie of the Year: (United States) Brooks Koepka
- Graduate of the Year: (United States) Brooks Koepka

The 2014 European Tour was the 43rd season of the European Tour, the main professional golf tour in Europe since its inaugural season in 1972.

== Changes for 2014 ==
New tournaments for the 2014 season were the Made in Denmark, D+D Real Czech Masters tournaments and the EurAsia Cup team event between the European Tour and the Asian Tour. Lost from the schedule were the Avantha Masters and the Johnnie Walker Championship at Gleneagles, with the venue hosting the 2014 Ryder Cup. In addition, the Ballantine's Championship moved from South Korea to Singapore and was renamed as The Championship at Laguna National. A third new tournament, the NH Collection Open, a dual-ranking event with the second-tier Challenge Tour, was later added to the schedule.

== Schedule ==
The following table lists official events during the 2014 season.

Date	Tournament	Host country	Purse	Winner (Note: The number in brackets after each winner's name is the number of European Tour events they had won up to and including that tournament. This information is only shown for European Tour members.)	OWGR points	Other tours (Note: AFR − Sunshine Tour; ANZ − PGA Tour of Australasia; ASA − Asian Tour; CHA − Challenge Tour; ONE − OneAsia Tour.)	Notes
24 Nov	South African Open Championship	South Africa	€1,100,000	(Denmark) Morten Ørum Madsen (1)	32	AFR (Note: Sunshine Tour flagship event)	
1 Dec	Alfred Dunhill Championship	South Africa	€1,500,000	(South Africa) Charl Schwartzel (9)	22	AFR	
8 Dec	Hong Kong Open	Hong Kong	US$1,300,000	(Spain) Miguel Ángel Jiménez (20)	20	ASA	
8 Dec	Nedbank Golf Challenge	South Africa	US$6,500,000	(Denmark) Thomas Bjørn (15)	46	AFR	New to European Tour; Limited-field event
14 Dec	Nelson Mandela Championship	South Africa	€1,000,000	(South Africa) Dawie van der Walt (2)	20	AFR	
12 Jan	Volvo Golf Champions	South Africa	US$4,000,000	(South Africa) Louis Oosthuizen (7)	34		Limited-field event
19 Jan	Abu Dhabi HSBC Golf Championship	UAE	US$2,700,000	(Spain) Pablo Larrazábal (3)	48		
25 Jan	Commercial Bank Qatar Masters	Qatar	US$2,500,000	(Spain) Sergio García (11)	44		
2 Feb	Omega Dubai Desert Classic	UAE	US$2,500,000	(Scotland) Stephen Gallacher (3)	48		
9 Feb	Joburg Open	South Africa	€1,300,000	(South Africa) George Coetzee (1)	20	AFR	
16 Feb	Africa Open	South Africa	€1,000,000	(South Africa) Thomas Aiken (3)	20	AFR	
23 Feb	WGC-Accenture Match Play Championship	United States	US$9,000,000	(Australia) Jason Day (n/a)	72		World Golf Championship
2 Mar	Tshwane Open	South Africa	€1,500,000	(England) Ross Fisher (5)	20	AFR	
9 Mar	WGC-Cadillac Championship	United States	US$9,000,000	(United States) Patrick Reed (1)	76		World Golf Championship
16 Mar	Trophée Hassan II	Morocco	€1,500,000	(Spain) Alejandro Cañizares (2)	24		
6 Apr	NH Collection Open	Spain	€600,000	(Italy) Marco Crespi (1)	18	CHA	New tournament
13 Apr	Masters Tournament	United States	US$9,000,000	(United States) Bubba Watson (n/a)	100		Major championship
20 Apr	Maybank Malaysian Open	Malaysia	US$2,750,000	(England) Lee Westwood (23)	32	ASA	
27 Apr	Volvo China Open	China	CN¥20,000,000	(France) Alexander Lévy (1)	32	ONE	
4 May	The Championship at Laguna National	Singapore	US$1,500,000	(Chile) Felipe Aguilar (2)	22	ASA	
11 May	Madeira Islands Open - Portugal - BPI	Portugal	€600,000	(England) Daniel Brooks (1)	18	CHA	
18 May	Open de España	Spain	€1,500,000	(Spain) Miguel Ángel Jiménez (21)	30		
25 May	BMW PGA Championship	England	€4,750,000	(Northern Ireland) Rory McIlroy (6)	64		Flagship event
1 Jun	Nordea Masters	Sweden	€1,500,000	(Thailand) Thongchai Jaidee (6)	36		
8 Jun	Lyoness Open	Austria	€1,000,000	(Sweden) Mikael Lundberg (3)	24		
15 Jun	U.S. Open	United States	US$9,000,000	(Germany) Martin Kaymer (11)	100		Major championship
22 Jun	Irish Open	Ireland	€2,000,000	(Finland) Mikko Ilonen (4)	26		
29 Jun	BMW International Open	Germany	€2,000,000	(Paraguay) Fabrizio Zanotti (1)	42		
6 Jul	Alstom Open de France	France	€3,000,000	(Northern Ireland) Graeme McDowell (10)	36		
13 Jul	Aberdeen Asset Management Scottish Open	Scotland	£3,000,000	(England) Justin Rose (7)	52		
20 Jul	The Open Championship	England	£5,400,000	(Northern Ireland) Rory McIlroy (7)	100		Major championship
27 Jul	M2M Russian Open	Russia	€1,000,000	(England) David Horsey (3)	24		
3 Aug	WGC-Bridgestone Invitational	United States	US$9,000,000	(Northern Ireland) Rory McIlroy (8)	76		World Golf Championship
10 Aug	PGA Championship	United States	US$10,000,000	(Northern Ireland) Rory McIlroy (9)	100		Major championship
17 Aug	Made in Denmark	Denmark	€1,500,000	(Scotland) Marc Warren (3)	24		New tournament
24 Aug	D+D Real Czech Masters	Czech Republic	€1,000,000	(Wales) Jamie Donaldson (3)	24		New tournament
31 Aug	Open d'Italia	Italy	€1,500,000	(South Africa) Hennie Otto (3)	24		
7 Sep	Omega European Masters	Switzerland	€2,300,000	(United States) David Lipsky (1)	30	ASA	
14 Sep	KLM Open	Netherlands	€1,800,000	(England) Paul Casey (13)	28		
21 Sep	ISPS Handa Wales Open	Wales	£1,800,000	(Netherlands) Joost Luiten (4)	30		
5 Oct	Alfred Dunhill Links Championship	Scotland	US$5,000,000	(England) Oliver Wilson (1)	44		Pro-Am
12 Oct	Portugal Masters	Portugal	€2,000,000	(France) Alexander Lévy (2)	24		
19 Oct	Volvo World Match Play Championship	England	€2,250,000	(Finland) Mikko Ilonen (5)	28		Limited-field event
19 Oct	Hong Kong Open	Hong Kong	US$1,300,000	(Australia) Scott Hend (1)	19	ASA	
26 Oct	Perth International	Australia	A$1,750,000	(Denmark) Thorbjørn Olesen (2)	22	ANZ	
2 Nov	BMW Masters	China	US$7,000,000	(Germany) Marcel Siem (4)	46		Race to Dubai finals series
9 Nov	WGC-HSBC Champions	China	US$8,500,000	(United States) Bubba Watson (n/a)	68		World Golf Championship; Race to Dubai finals series
16 Nov	Turkish Airlines Open	Turkey	US$7,000,000	(United States) Brooks Koepka (1)	48		Race to Dubai finals series
23 Nov	DP World Tour Championship, Dubai	UAE	US$8,000,000	(Sweden) Henrik Stenson (9)	56		Race to Dubai finals series

=== Unofficial events ===
The following events were sanctioned by the European Tour, but did not carry official money, nor were wins official.

Date	Tournament	Host country	Purse	Winners	OWGR points	Notes
29 Mar	EurAsia Cup	Malaysia	n/a	Tied	n/a	New team event
28 Sep	Ryder Cup	Scotland	n/a	Team Europe	n/a	Team event

== Location of tournaments ==
Location of official tournaments of the 2014 European Tour in Europe.
Major Championship
Flagship event
Final Series event
Regular event
Location of official tournaments of the 2014 European Tour outside Europe.
Major Championship
World Golf Championship
Final Series event
Regular event

South Africa
United Arab Emirates

== Race to Dubai ==
The Race to Dubai was based on tournament results during the season, calculated using a points-based system.

Pos.	Player	Majors				WGCs				Flagship event and R2D finals series (Note: The WGC-HSBC Champions was also a Race to Dubai finals series event.)				Top 10s in other ET events								Tmts	Points and money (Note: In addition to tournament prize money, the top 15 point scorers received a share of a $5m bonus pool.)		
Pos.	Player	Mas	USO	Opn	PGA	WGC MP	WGC Cad	WGC Inv	WGC Cha	BMW PGA	BMW Mas	Tur	DPW TC	1	2	3	4	5	6	7	8	Tmts	Reg. points	Bon. ($)	Total points
1	(Northern Ireland) McIlroy	T8	T23	1st	1st	T17	T25	1st	•	1st	•	•	T2	T2	T9	T2						15	6,149,023	1,250,000	7,149,503
2	(Sweden) Stenson	T14	T4	T39	T3	T17	T16	T19	T24	T7	•	T3	1st	4th	T5	5th	T2	2nd				20	4,340,786	800,000	4,981,093
3	(England) Rose	T14	T12	T23	T24	T17	T34	T4	T48	25th	T4	•	T2	T7	1st							14	2,756,185	530,000	3,180,388
4	(Wales) Donaldson	T14	CUT	CUT	T24	T33	T2	T37	T24	T30	T4	T19	T12	T2	T5	T5	1st	7th	T4			25	2,738,012	400,000	3,058,166
5	(France) Dubuisson	CUT	T28	T9	T7	2nd	T62	T31	WD	•	T21	T15	T2	T5	T2	T5	2nd					23	2,686,390	350,000	2,966,524
6	(Spain) García	CUT	T35	T2	T35	T9	T16	2nd	T28	WD	•	T25	T12	T2	1st							17	2,621,814	300,000	2,861,930
7	(Germany) Siem	•	T12	•	•	•	•	•	T48	T7	1st	T8	T39									22	2,539,276	250,000	2,739,373
8	(United States) Koepka	•	T4	T67	T15	•	•	•	•	CUT	T48	1st	T42	T3	T3	T9						15	2,471,796	200,000	2,631,873
9	(France) Lévy	•	•	•	T30	•	•	T58	T14	T12	T2	T11	T26	1st	1st							30	2,316,692	170,000	2,452,757
10	(Republic of Ireland) Lowry	•	CUT	T9	T46	•	•	•	34th	2nd	T16	T25	5th	T4	T2	T6	T9					27	2,053,806	150,000	2,173,864
11	(Netherlands) Luiten	T26	CUT	CUT	26th	T33	T13	T56	T28	T12	T13	T25	T9	T3	6th	4th	3rd	T4	T5	1st	3rd	27	2,046,118	140,000	2,158,172
12	(Denmark) Bjørn	T8	•	T26	CUT	T17	T44	T15	T41	T3	T24	•	T36	1st	T10	T10	T8	T4				26	2,018,352	130,000	2,122,402
13	(England) Poulter	T20	T17	CUT	T58	T33	T52	T52	T6	T26	T48	2nd	T21	T5								15	1,996,523	120,000	2,092,569
14	(Northern Ireland) McDowell	CUT	T28	T9	T46	T5	T9	T8	T3	•	T16	•	T47	T6	1st	T9						15	1,961,314	110,000	2,049,356
15	(Germany) Kaymer	T31	1st	70th	CUT	T33	T58	T56	T6	T12	•	T60	T39									18	1,960,512	100,000	2,040,550

Win
Top 10
Made cut
Missed cut
Withdrew
• Did not play

== Awards ==
Award	Winner	Ref.
Golfer of the Year	(Northern Ireland) Rory McIlroy	
Players' Player of the Year	(Northern Ireland) Rory McIlroy	
Sir Henry Cotton Rookie of the Year	(United States) Brooks Koepka	
Graduate of the Year	(United States) Brooks Koepka	

== See also ==
- 2013 in golf
- 2014 in golf
- 2014 European Senior Tour
