= 2014 BMW PGA Championship =

Tournament information
- Dates: 22–25 May 2014
- Location: Virginia Water, Surrey, England; 51.40°N 0.59°W
- Courses: Wentworth Club; West Course
- Tour: European Tour

Statistics
- Par: 72
- Length: 7,302 yards (6,677 m)
- Field: 150 players, 74 after cut
- Cut: 146 (+2)
- Prize fund: €4,750,000 $6,175,000
- Winner's share: €791,660 $1,029,158

Champion
- (Northern Ireland) Rory McIlroy
- 274 (−14)

Location map
- Location in England Location in Surrey

The 2014 BMW PGA Championship was the 60th edition of the BMW PGA Championship, an annual golf tournament on the European Tour, held 22–25 May at the West Course of Wentworth Club in Virginia Water, Surrey, England, a suburb southwest of London.

Seven strokes back after three rounds, Rory McIlroy won with a final round 66 (−6), a stroke ahead of runner-up Shane Lowry. It was his first win at the event, and sixth victory on the European Tour. Thomas Bjørn led (or co-led) after each or the first three rounds, but fell into a tie for third after a final round 75 (+3).

Defending champion Matteo Manassero opened with an 80 and missed the cut by five strokes.

== Course layout ==
Wentworth Club, West Course
Tee	Rating/Slope	1	2	3	4	5	6	7	8	9	Out	10	11	12	13	14	15	16	17	18	In	Total
Yardage	n/a	473	154	465	552	203	418	396	391	449	3,501	184	416	531	470	179	489	383	610	539	3,801	7,302
Par		4	3	4	5	3	4	4	4	4	35	3	4	5	4	3	4	4	5	5	37	72

== Round summaries ==
=== First round ===
Thursday, 22 May 2014
Friday, 23 May 2014

Thomas Bjørn tied the course record, 62 (−10), with a bogey-free round that included eight birdies and an eagle. Two separate weather delays meant that the first round could not be completed on Thursday; 33 players were still on the course when darkness fell and completed their rounds on Friday morning.

Place	Player	Score	To par
1	(Denmark) Thomas Bjørn	62	−10
2	(Republic of Ireland) Shane Lowry	64	−8
3	(Spain) Rafa Cabrera-Bello	65	−7
4	(France) Gary Stal	66	−6
T5	(England) Anthony Wall	67	−5
T5	(South Africa) Justin Walters	67	−5
T5	(Paraguay) Fabrizio Zanotti	67	−5
T8	(South Africa) Thomas Aiken	68	−4
T8	(Sweden) Jonas Blixt	68	−4
T8	(England) David Horsey	68	−4
T8	(Germany) Martin Kaymer	68	−4
T8	(Northern Ireland) Rory McIlroy	68	−4
T8	(Sweden) Henrik Stenson	68	−4

==== Scorecard ====
Hole	1	2	3	4	5	6	7	8	9	10	11	12	13	14	15	16	17	18
Par	4	3	4	5	3	4	4	4	4	3	4	5	4	3	4	4	5	5
(Denmark) Bjørn	E	−1	−1	−2	−2	−2	−3	−3	−3	−4	−5	−7	−7	−8	−8	−9	−9	−10

=== Second round ===
Friday, 23 May 2014

Place	Player	Score	To par
T1	(Denmark) Thomas Bjørn	62-72=134	−10
T1	(Republic of Ireland) Shane Lowry	64-70=134	−10
T3	(Spain) Rafa Cabrera-Bello	65-73=138	−6
T3	(England) Luke Donald	71-67=138	−6
T5	(Sweden) Jonas Blixt	68-71=139	−5
T5	(Northern Ireland) Rory McIlroy	68-71=139	−5
T5	(Sweden) Henrik Stenson	68-71=139	−5
T5	(Paraguay) Fabrizio Zanotti	67-72=139	−5
T9	(South Africa) Thomas Aiken	68-72=140	−4
T9	(England) Seve Benson	71-69=140	−4
T9	(Denmark) Anders Hansen	71-69=140	−4
T9	(Spain) Pablo Larrazábal	69-71=140	−4
T9	(Germany) Marcel Siem	69-71=140	−4

=== Third round ===
Saturday, 24 May 2014

Place	Player	Score	To par
1	(Denmark) Thomas Bjørn	62-72-67=201	−15
2	(England) Luke Donald	71-67-68=206	−10
3	(Republic of Ireland) Shane Lowry	64-70-73=207	−9
T4	(Netherlands) Joost Luiten	70-71-67=208	−8
T4	(Northern Ireland) Rory McIlroy	68-71-69=208	−8
6	(Spain) Pablo Larrazábal	69-71-69=209	−7
T7	(South Africa) Thomas Aiken	68-72-70=210	−6
T7	(Scotland) Chris Doak	69-72-69=210	−6
T7	(Wales) Jamie Donaldson	73-69-68=210	−6
T7	(Italy) Francesco Molinari	71-74-65=210	−6
T7	(England) Eddie Pepperell	69-73-68=210	−6
T7	(Sweden) Henrik Stenson	68-71-71=210	−6
T7	(England) Andy Sullivan	70-71-69=210	−6
T7	(England) Anthony Wall	67-76-67=210	−6

=== Final round ===
Sunday, 25 May 2014

Place	Player	Score	To par	Money (€)
1	(Northern Ireland) Rory McIlroy	68-71-69-66=274	−14	791,660
2	(Republic of Ireland) Shane Lowry	64-70-73-68=275	−13	527,770
T3	(Denmark) Thomas Bjørn	62-72-67-75=276	−12	267,425
T3	(England) Luke Donald	71-67-68-70=276	−12	267,425
T5	(England) Simon Dyson	69-74-69-67=279	−9	183,825
T5	(Scotland) Stephen Gallacher	70-75-68-66=279	−9	183,825
T7	(South Africa) Thomas Aiken	68-72-70-70=280	−8	110,010
T7	(Spain) Pablo Larrazábal	69-71-69-71=280	−8	110,010
T7	(Italy) Francesco Molinari	71-74-65-70=280	−8	110,010
T7	(Germany) Marcel Siem	69-71-72-68=280	−8	110,010
T7	(Sweden) Henrik Stenson	68-71-71-70=280	−8	110,010

==== Scorecard ====
Final round

Hole	1	2	3	4	5	6	7	8	9	10	11	12	13	14	15	16	17	18
Par	4	3	4	5	3	4	4	4	4	3	4	5	4	3	4	4	5	5
(Northern Ireland) McIlroy	−8	−8	−8	−10	−10	−9	−10	−10	−9	−10	−10	−11	−12	−12	−12	−12	−13	−14
(Republic of Ireland) Lowry	−9	−9	−9	−11	−12	−12	−12	−12	−11	−12	−13	−14	−12	−13	−12	−12	−12	−13
(Denmark) Bjørn	−15	−15	−15	−16	−15	−12	−12	−12	−11	−11	−11	−12	−12	−11	−10	−11	−12	−12
(England) Donald	−9	−9	−9	−10	−10	−7	−8	−8	−8	−9	−9	−10	−11	−11	−11	−12	−12	−12

Cumulative tournament scores, relative to par
