= 2014 Volvo World Match Play Championship =

Coordinates: 51.19°N 0.73°E

Tournament information
- Dates: 15–19 October
- Location: Kent, England
- Course: London Golf Club
- Tour: European Tour
- Format: Match play – 18 holes

Statistics
- Field: 16 players
- Prize fund: €2,250,000
- Winner's share: €650,000

Champion
- (Finland) Mikko Ilonen
- def. (Sweden) Henrik Stenson 3 & 1

England

The 2014 Volvo World Match Play Championship was the 49th World Match Play Championship to be played. It was held 15–19 October, with the champion receiving €650,000. The format was 16 players split into four pools of four, with the top two in each pool progressing to the knock-out stage. It is an official money event on the European Tour.

== Format ==
The 16 players are split into four pools of four, seeded by their Official World Golf Ranking. Within each pool, every player plays each other in a round-robin format over 18-hole matches. Points are awarded based upon win (2), tie (1) or loss (0). The two leading players from each pool advance to the knock-out stage. In the case of a tie in the standings, head-to-head results determine places with sudden-death playoffs used to determine standings if head-to-head match halved.

== Participants ==
Seed	Player	Rank
1	(Sweden) Henrik Stenson	5
2	(Northern Ireland) Graeme McDowell	18
3	(France) Victor Dubuisson	23
4	(Wales) Jamie Donaldson	25
5	(United States) Patrick Reed	26
6	(Scotland) Stephen Gallacher	35
7	(Netherlands) Joost Luiten	37
8	(Thailand) Thongchai Jaidee	41
9	(Italy) Francesco Molinari	48
10	(Finland) Mikko Ilonen	52
11	(Republic of Ireland) Shane Lowry	53
12	(Sweden) Jonas Blixt	58
13	(England) Paul Casey	66
14	(Spain) Pablo Larrazábal	70
15	(France) Alexander Lévy	74
16	(South Africa) George Coetzee	89

== Pool play ==
- Round 1 – 15 October
- Round 2 – 16 October
- Round 3 – 17 October

Arnold Palmer Group
Round	Winner	Score	Loser
1	Henrik Stenson & George Coetzee – halved		
1	Thongchai Jaidee	2 up	Francesco Molinari
2	Henrik Stenson	2 & 1	Francesco Molinari
2	George Coetzee	2 & 1	Thongchai Jaidee
3	Henrik Stenson	2 & 1	Thongchai Jaidee
3	Francesco Molinari	2 & 1	George Coetzee

- 1st – Henrik Stenson
- 2nd – George Coetzee
- 3rd – Thongchai Jaidee & Francesco Molinari

Assar Gabrielsson Group
Round	Winner	Score	Loser
1	Victor Dubuisson	3 & 2	Pablo Larrazábal
1	Shane Lowry	3 & 2	Stephen Gallacher
2	Victor Dubuisson	3 & 2	Shane Lowry
2	Pablo Larrazábal	1 up	Stephen Gallacher
3	Stephen Gallacher	2 & 1	Victor Dubuisson
3	Pablo Larrazábal	2 & 1	Shane Lowry

- 1st – Victor Dubuisson (first place based on
  head-to-head match vs Larrazábal)
- 2nd – Pablo Larrazábal
- 3rd – Stephen Gallacher & Shane Lowry

Mark McCormack Group
Round	Winner	Score	Loser
1	Paul Casey	2 & 1	Jamie Donaldson
1	Jonas Blixt	2 & 1	Patrick Reed
2	Jamie Donaldson	3 & 2	Jonas Blixt
2	Patrick Reed	2 & 1	Paul Casey
3	Patrick Reed	3 & 2	Jamie Donaldson
3	Jonas Blixt & Paul Casey – halved		

- 1st – Patrick Reed
- 2nd – Jonas Blixt (won second place on first
  sudden-death playoff hole)
- 3rd – Paul Casey
- 4th – Jamie Donaldson

Gustaf Larson Group
Round	Winner	Score	Loser
1	Graeme McDowell	3 & 2	Alexander Lévy
1	Joost Luiten	1 up	Mikko Ilonen
2	Mikko Ilonen	2 & 1	Graeme McDowell
2	Joost Luiten	4 & 3	Alexander Lévy
3	Joost Luiten	2 up	Graeme McDowell
3	Mikko Ilonen	1 up	Alexander Lévy

- 1st – Joost Luiten
- 2nd – Mikko Ilonen
- 3rd – Graeme McDowell
- 4th – Alexander Lévy

== Playoffs ==
Quarter-finals; 18 October
(Netherlands) Joost Luiten	6 & 5
(Spain) Pablo Larrazábal
(France) Victor Dubuisson
(Finland) Mikko Ilonen	2 up
(United States) Patrick Reed
(South Africa) George Coetzee	2 & 1
(Sweden) Henrik Stenson	2 up
(Sweden) Jonas Blixt

Semi-finals; 19 October – morning
(Netherlands) Joost Luiten
(Finland) Mikko Ilonen	2 & 1
(South Africa) George Coetzee
(Sweden) Henrik Stenson	1 up

Final; 19 October – afternoon
(Finland) Mikko Ilonen	3 & 1
(Sweden) Henrik Stenson
Third place
(Netherlands) Joost Luiten	19 h
(South Africa) George Coetzee

== Prize money breakdown ==
Place	Actual prize fund (€)	Race to Dubai fund (€)
Champion	650,000	375,000
Runner-up	330,000	250,000
Third place	210,000	140,850
Fourth place	160,000	112,500
Quarter-finals losers x 4	100,000	74,475
Third in group x 4	75,000	43,875
Last in group x 4	50,000	33,862
Total	€2,250,000	€1,487,198
