= 2014 Ryder Cup =

Golf tournament in Scotland

40th Ryder Cup Matches
- Dates: 26–28 September 2014
- Venue: Gleneagles Hotel; PGA Centenary Course
- Location: Auchterarder, Perth & Kinross, Scotland
- Captains: Paul McGinley (Europe); Tom Watson (USA)
(Europe)	16 1/2	11 1/2	(United States)
- Europe wins the Ryder Cup

Location map
- Location within Scotland

The 40th Ryder Cup matches were held 26–28 September 2014 in Scotland on the PGA Centenary Course at the Gleneagles Hotel near Auchterarder in Perth & Kinross. This was the second Ryder Cup held in Scotland; it was previously at Muirfield in 1973. The team captains in 2014 were Paul McGinley for Europe and Tom Watson for the USA.

Europe were the defending cup holders, having won in 2012 at Medinah Country Club near Chicago.

Europe won the 2014 competition to retain the Ryder Cup, defeating the US by 16 1/2 points to 11 1/2, for their third consecutive win. From 1995 to 2014, Europe won eight out of ten Ryder Cups.

== Format ==
The Ryder Cup is a match play event, with each match worth one point. The competition format was as follows:

- Day 1 (Friday) – 4 fourball (better ball) matches in the morning, followed by 4 foursome (alternate shot) matches in the afternoon
- Day 2 (Saturday) – 4 fourball matches in the morning, followed by 4 foursome matches in the afternoon
- Day 3 (Sunday) – 12 singles matches

On the Monday before the competition, European captain Paul McGinley announced that he had chosen to play fourball matches in the mornings, as had been the case for every European home captain since 1997 (while American home captains have chosen to play foursomes in the mornings every year except for 2004).

With a total of 28 points available, 14 1/2 points were required for the US to win the Ryder Cup, and 14 points were required for Europe to retain it. All matches were played to a maximum of 18 holes. If a match was level after 18 holes each side was awarded half a point.

== Course ==
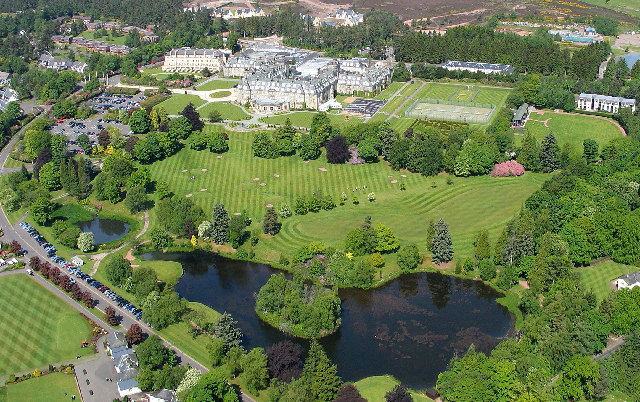
Gleneagles Hotel and grounds in 2004

The Gleneagles Hotel, located one hour outside of Edinburgh and set in grounds of 850 acres (340 ha; 1.33 sq mi), had undergone a major redevelopment programme, partly in preparation for the 2014 Ryder Cup.

The PGA Centenary Course, designed by Jack Nicklaus and one of three at Gleneagles, currently measures 7,262 yards (6,640 m) off the championship tees. The course was awarded the Ryder Cup in 2001, and it was originally scheduled to host the matches in 2013, however this was delayed a year due to the alteration of the Ryder Cup schedule after the September 11 attacks in 2001. This was the final Ryder Cup to be affected by the rescheduling, as it was the furthest scheduled match at the time of the attacks. Just as the 2012 matches had been, all future matches are regularly scheduled for even-numbered years.

Hole	1	2	3	4	5	6	7	8	9	Out	10	11	12	13	14	15	16	17	18	In	Total
Yards	426	516	431	239	461	201	468	419	564	3,725	208	350	445	481	320	463	543	194	533	3,537	7,262
Par	4	5	4	3	4	3	4	4	5	36	3	4	4	4	4	4	5	3	5	36	72

== Television ==
In the United Kingdom and Ireland, Sky Sports provided live coverage, with the BBC showing highlights each evening on free-to-air television.

Coverage in South Africa was provided on the Supersport channels.

In the US, corporate siblings Golf Channel and NBC televised the event live, after NBC had traded for complete rights (that it was contractually given the rights to in 2005) back from ESPN, who had televised the previous three Ryder Cups on Friday. Golf Channel televised action on Friday and a half-hour on Saturday, from where NBC took over for the rest of the weekend. In the early-morning sessions, Terry Gannon hosted from the 18th tower alongside Frank Nobilo. Curt Byrum and Tom Abbott served as hole announcers and Jerry Foltz was an on-course commentator. Nick Faldo appeared as a guest commentator on Friday, and sparked controversy after critical comments about Sergio García. For the afternoon sessions and the singles matches on Sunday, the regular NBC golf crew provided coverage. Dan Hicks and Johnny Miller hosted from the 18th tower, with Gary Koch and Peter Jacobsen as hole announcers. On course commentators were Mark Rolfing, Roger Maltbie and Notah Begay III. On the weekend, Colin Montgomerie appeared as a guest commentator to lend a European perspective, a role he previously filled for NBC in 2012.

== Team qualification and selection ==
=== Europe ===
The European team qualification rules were announced on 21 May 2013. The number of captain's picks was increased from 2 to 3 with the number of players qualifying from the European Points being reduced from 5 to 4. The team consists of:

- The leading four players on the Ryder Cup European Points List
  - Points (1 Point = 1 Euro) earned in all Race to Dubai tournaments starting with the 2013 ISPS Handa Wales Open and ending following the conclusion of the 2014 Italian Open
- The leading five players, not qualified above, on the Ryder Cup World Points List
  - Total World Rankings Points earned in Official World Golf Ranking events starting on 26 August 2013 (the start date of the ISPS Handa Wales Open) and ending on 24 August 2014 and thereafter only from the Italian Open scheduled to conclude on 31 August 2014.
- Three captain's picks
  - The captain's picks were announced on 2 September 2014 following the conclusion of the Italian Open and Deutsche Bank Championship. McGinley selected Stephen Gallacher, Ian Poulter, and Lee Westwood.

The leading players in the European Ryder Cup points lists were:

European points list
Position	Name	Points
1	Rory McIlroy (Q)	5,537,075
2	Henrik Stenson (Q)	2,893,569
3	Victor Dubuisson (Q)	2,880,183
4	Jamie Donaldson (Q)	2,676,347
5	Sergio García (q)	2,539,593
6	Thomas Bjørn (q)	2,489,769
7	Justin Rose (q)	2,138,323
8	Martin Kaymer (q)	2,006,411
9	Ian Poulter (P)	1,962,707
10	Joost Luiten	1,734,717
11	Stephen Gallacher (P)	1,698,110
12	Graeme McDowell (q)	1,668,114
13	Miguel Ángel Jiménez	1,579,637
14	Francesco Molinari	1,461,394
15	Gonzalo Fernández-Castaño	1,316,360
16	Mikko Ilonen	1,254,683
17	Shane Lowry	1,248,905
18	David Howell	1,198,954
19	Lee Westwood (P)	1,167,563
20	Pablo Larrazábal	1,112,459

World points list
Position	Name	Points
1	Rory McIlroy (q)	538.18
2	Henrik Stenson (q)	389.60
3	Sergio García (Q)	368.05
4	Justin Rose (Q)	287.38
5	Martin Kaymer (Q)	247.27
6	Thomas Bjørn (Q)	206.34
7	Victor Dubuisson (q)	204.79
8	Jamie Donaldson (q)	194.51
9	Graeme McDowell (Q)	171.82
10	Stephen Gallacher (P)	170.21
11	Luke Donald	167.55
12	Ian Poulter (P)	150.62
13	Miguel Ángel Jiménez	142.85
14	Francesco Molinari	141.45
15	Joost Luiten	136.58
16	Lee Westwood (P)	120.48
17	Gonzalo Fernández-Castaño	111.13
18	Pablo Larrazábal	106.27
19	Mikko Ilonen	102.89
20	Shane Lowry	95.55

Players in qualifying places (Q) are shown in green; captain's picks (P) are shown in yellow; those in italics (q) qualified through the other points list.

In the European points list, Donaldson had overtaken García by winning the penultimate qualifying event (the D+D Real Czech Masters) and since neither García nor Bjørn played in the final event (the Italian Open) and since no other player could pass Donaldson, he was assured of his place before the Italian Open.

The leading four players in the World points list (García, Rose, Kaymer and Bjørn) had qualified before the final event (the Italian Open). Stephen Gallacher was then 11.21 points behind Graeme McDowell. The winner of the Italian Open would score 24 points with second place scoring 14.4 and third 9.6. Gallacher therefore needed to either win the Italian Open, finish second alone or finish second jointly with just one other player (scoring 12 points) to overtake McDowell and move into the final automatic qualification spot. In the final round he scored 65 but David Howell (playing in the group before) had scored 63 to take second place by a single shot, pushing Gallacher down to third place.

=== United States ===
The United States qualification rules were announced on 20 March 2013. They remained the same as for 2012 except that the number of captain's picks was reduced from four to three. The team consists of:

- The leading nine players on the Ryder Cup points list
  - Points are gained from money earned in majors in 2013 and official 2014 PGA Tour events beginning with the Frys.com Open on 10 October 2013 through the PGA Championship on 10 August 2014. One point is awarded for every $1,000 earned. Money earned in 2014 majors count double and money earned in 2014 alternate events (those played opposite the majors or World Golf Championships) count half.
- Three captain's picks
  - The captain's picks were announced on 2 September 2014 following the conclusion of the Italian Open and Deutsche Bank Championship. Watson selected Keegan Bradley, Hunter Mahan, and Webb Simpson.

Players in the qualifying places are shown in green, and captain's picks are shown in yellow. In late July Dustin Johnson announced that he was taking a leave of absence from golf and would miss the Ryder Cup. The qualifying places were therefore extended to the player finishing in 10th place in the points list. Mickelson's second-place finish in the 2014 PGA Championship lifted him from 11th to 5th place in the standings. Zach Johnson made the cut in the PGA Championship and this was sufficient to lift him above Jason Dufner and give him the last automatic place despite a last round of 77 which left him in a tie for 70th place and 35.8 points. Dufner withdrew from the event because of a neck injury.

Position	Name	2013 Majors	2014 Majors	Regular events	Alternate events	Points
1	Bubba Watson	105.977	3277.400	3546.661	0	6930.038
2	Rickie Fowler	293.697	4994.480	1445.076	0	6733.253
3	Jim Furyk	921.040	2302.118	3484.536	0	6707.694
4	Jimmy Walker	0	1548.130	4563.275	0	6111.405
5	Phil Mickelson	2172.000	2436.928	901.411	0	5510.339
	Dustin Johnson	413.662	941.927	3778.217	0	5133.806
6	Matt Kuchar	462.226	1044.939	3607.500	0	5114.665
7	Jordan Spieth	24.641	1913.010	2898.177	0	4835.828
8	Patrick Reed	0	134.440	3515.787	0	3650.227
9	Zach Johnson	496.827	166.024	2905.843	0	3568.694
10	Jason Dufner	1883.199	50.059	1626.462	0	3559.720
11	Ryan Moore	88.151	374.315	2890.405	0	3352.871
12	Brendon Todd	0	344.373	2999.009	0	3343.382
13	Keegan Bradley	206.530	840.555	2277.612	0	3324.697
14	Chris Kirk	16.300	509.431	2762.151	0	3287.882
15	Webb Simpson	125.081	61.656	2968.833	0	3155.570

In mid-August Tiger Woods announced that he would not be able to play in the 2014 Ryder Cup because of back problems and would therefore not be one of Watson's three captain's picks. Woods had finished 71st in the Ryder Cup points list.

== Teams ==
=== Captains ===
Tom Watson was named the USA team captain on 13 December 2012. At 65 he became the oldest Ryder Cup captain; a record previously held by J.H. Taylor who was 62 when he captained the Great Britain team in 1933. Previously the oldest United States captain had been Sam Snead who was 57 when he was captain in 1969.

Paul McGinley was named the Europe team captain on 15 January 2013. He was the first Irishman to captain the Ryder Cup side. McGinley had previously always been on the winning side in the Ryder Cup; as a player in 2002, 2004 and 2006 and as a vice-captain in 2010 and 2012.

=== Vice-captains ===
Each captain selected a number of vice-captains to assist him during the tournament.

In July 2013, Watson named Andy North as a vice-captain. In February 2014, he named Raymond Floyd as his second vice-captain and in August he chose Steve Stricker as a third vice-captain.

In March 2014, McGinley named Des Smyth and Sam Torrance as vice-captains. In September 2014, McGinley then announced that Miguel Ángel Jiménez, Pádraig Harrington and José María Olazábal would also join his backroom team, making five vice-captains in total.

=== Players ===
Team Europe
Name	Country	Age	Points rank (European)	Points rank (World)	World ranking	Previous Ryder Cups	Matches	W–L–H	Winning percentage
Rory McIlroy	Northern Ireland	25	1	1	1	2	9	4–3–2	55.56
Henrik Stenson	Sweden	38	2	2	5	2	7	2–3–2	42.86
Victor Dubuisson	France	24	3	7	23	0	Rookie		
Jamie Donaldson	Wales	38	4	8	25	0	Rookie		
Sergio García	Spain	34	5	3	3	6	28	16–8–4	64.29
Justin Rose	England	34	7	4	6	2	9	6–3–0	66.67
Martin Kaymer	Germany	29	8	5	12	2	6	3–2–1	58.33
Thomas Bjørn	Denmark	43	6	6	30	2	6	3–2–1	58.33
Graeme McDowell	Northern Ireland	35	12	9	18	3	12	5–5–2	50.00
Stephen Gallacher	Scotland	39	11	10	34	0	Rookie		
Ian Poulter	England	38	9	12	38	4	15	12–3–0	80.00
Lee Westwood	England	41	19	16	44	8	37	18–13–6	56.76

Captains picks are shown in yellow; the world rankings and records are at the start of the 2014 Ryder Cup.

The players with the highest world rankings not on the team were: Luke Donald (ranked 32), Joost Luiten (36), and Miguel Ángel Jiménez (37).

Team USA
Name	Age	Points rank	World ranking	Previous Ryder Cups	Matches	W–L–H	Winning percentage
Bubba Watson	35	1	7	2	8	3–5–0	37.50
Rickie Fowler	25	2	10	1	3	0–1–2	33.33
Jim Furyk	44	3	4	8	30	9–17–4	36.67
Jimmy Walker	35	4	19	0	Rookie		
Phil Mickelson	44	5	11	9	38	14–18–6	44.74
Matt Kuchar	36	6	9	2	7	3–2–2	57.14
Jordan Spieth	21	7	13	0	Rookie		
Patrick Reed	24	8	27	0	Rookie		
Zach Johnson	38	9	16	3	11	6–4–1	59.09
Keegan Bradley	28	13	26	1	4	3–1–0	75.00
Webb Simpson	29	15	33	1	4	2–2–0	50.00
Hunter Mahan	32	25	21	2	8	3–2–3	56.25

Captains picks are shown in yellow; the world rankings and records are at the start of the 2014 Ryder Cup.

The players with the highest world rankings not on the team were: Billy Horschel (ranked 14), Chris Kirk (22), and Steve Stricker (28). Their respective rankings on 2 September were 45, 25, and 24. The rankings for 7 September were 23, 24, and 25, respectively. After finishing tied for second at the Deutsche Bank Championship on 1 September, Horschel had won the next two events, the BMW Championship and The Tour Championship, to secure the FedEx Cup.

Mickelson extended his own U.S. team record with his 10th appearance. Nick Faldo holds the European record with 11.

== Friday's matches ==
=== Morning fourballs ===
The United States won two matches and halved another to take the lead in the Ryder Cup. Jordan Spieth and Patrick Reed, the youngest American pairing in the history of the competition, defeated Ian Poulter and Stephen Gallacher 5 & 4. This was Poulter's first loss in his last eight Ryder Cup matches.

The Spieth/Reed pairing had a combined age of 45 compared to the previous youngest American pairing which had been the Justin Leonard/Tiger Woods pairing in 1997 which had a combined age of 46. The youngest in Ryder Cup history are the Mark James/Ken Brown pairing in 1977 with a combined age of 43 and Bernard Gallacher/Maurice Bembridge in 1969 with a combined age of 44.

	Results
Rose/Stenson	(Europe) 5 & 4	B. Watson/Simpson
Bjørn/Kaymer	halved	Fowler/Walker
Gallacher/Poulter	(United States) 5 & 4	Spieth/Reed
García/McIlroy	(United States) 1 up	Bradley/Mickelson
1 1/2	Session	2 1/2
1 1/2	Overall	2 1/2

=== Afternoon foursomes ===
Europe won three matches and halved the fourth to take a 5–3 lead in the Ryder Cup. It was the first time since 2006 that Europe led after the first day of the competition. Justin Rose and Henrik Stenson, who won 5 & 4 in their morning match, played again and won; they never trailed at any point during the day. Gene Wojciechowski, a columnist for ESPN, criticized American captain Tom Watson for not playing Jordan Spieth and Patrick Reed in the afternoon after they had won their morning match 5 & 4.

	Results
Donaldson/Westwood	(Europe) 2 up	Furyk/Kuchar
Rose/Stenson	(Europe) 2 & 1	Mahan/Johnson
McIlroy/García	halved	Walker/Fowler
Dubuisson/McDowell	(Europe) 3 & 2	Mickelson/Bradley
3 1/2	Session	1/2
5	Overall	3

== Saturday's matches ==
=== Morning fourballs ===
The European pairing of Justin Rose and Henrik Stenson led off and won their third straight match in two days. Their score of 12-under set a Ryder Cup record in fourballs.

	Results
Rose/Stenson	(Europe) 3 & 2	B. Watson/Kuchar
Donaldson/Westwood	(United States) 4 & 3	Furyk/Mahan
Bjørn/Kaymer	(United States) 5 & 3	Reed/Spieth
McIlroy/Poulter	halved	Walker/Fowler
1 1/2	Session	2 1/2
6 1/2	Overall	5 1/2

=== Afternoon foursomes ===
For the second straight day, Europe earned 3 1/2 points in the afternoon foursomes, increasing their lead to 4 going into the singles matches.

Because of a late finish by Rory McIlroy in the morning session Match 2 (Furyk/Mahan v. García/McIlroy) started after Match 3 (Spieth/Reed v. Kaymer/Rose). The table below reflects the official order.

	Results
Donaldson/Westwood	(Europe) 2 & 1	Johnson/Kuchar
García/McIlroy	(Europe) 3 & 2	Furyk/Mahan
Kaymer/Rose	halved	Spieth/Reed
Dubuisson/McDowell	(Europe) 5 & 4	Walker/Fowler
3 1/2	Session	1/2
10	Overall	6

== Sunday's singles matches ==
Europe won the Ryder Cup for the third consecutive time. Welshman Jamie Donaldson played the winning shot when his second to the 15th hole landed less than 2 feet from the hole and Keegan Bradley conceded the hole. Donaldson had halved the 14th hole with Bradley to find himself in a dormie position, where a minimum half-point is guaranteed. This meant that Europe were guaranteed a minimum 14–14 score (enough to retain the cup) but the scores are not official until the match is actually won, or halved after 18 holes.

	Results		Order of finishing & score after match
Graeme McDowell	(Europe) 2 & 1	Jordan Spieth	2nd: 12–6
Henrik Stenson	(United States) 1 up	Patrick Reed	3rd: 12–7
Rory McIlroy	(Europe) 5 & 4	Rickie Fowler	1st: 11–6
Justin Rose	halved	Hunter Mahan	7th: 13 1/2–9 1/2
Stephen Gallacher	(United States) 3 & 1	Phil Mickelson	6th: 13–9
Martin Kaymer	(Europe) 4 & 2	Bubba Watson	4th: 13–7
Thomas Bjørn	(United States) 4 & 3	Matt Kuchar	5th: 13–8
Sergio García	(Europe) 1 up	Jim Furyk	9th: 15 1/2–9 1/2
Ian Poulter	halved	Webb Simpson	10th: 16–10
Jamie Donaldson	(Europe) 5 & 3	Keegan Bradley	8th: 14 1/2–9 1/2
Lee Westwood	(United States) 3 & 2	Jimmy Walker	11th: 16–11
Victor Dubuisson	halved	Zach Johnson	12th: 16 1/2–11 1/2
6 1/2	Session	5 1/2
16 1/2	Overall	11 1/2

== Individual player records ==
Each entry refers to the win–loss–half record of the player.

=== Europe ===
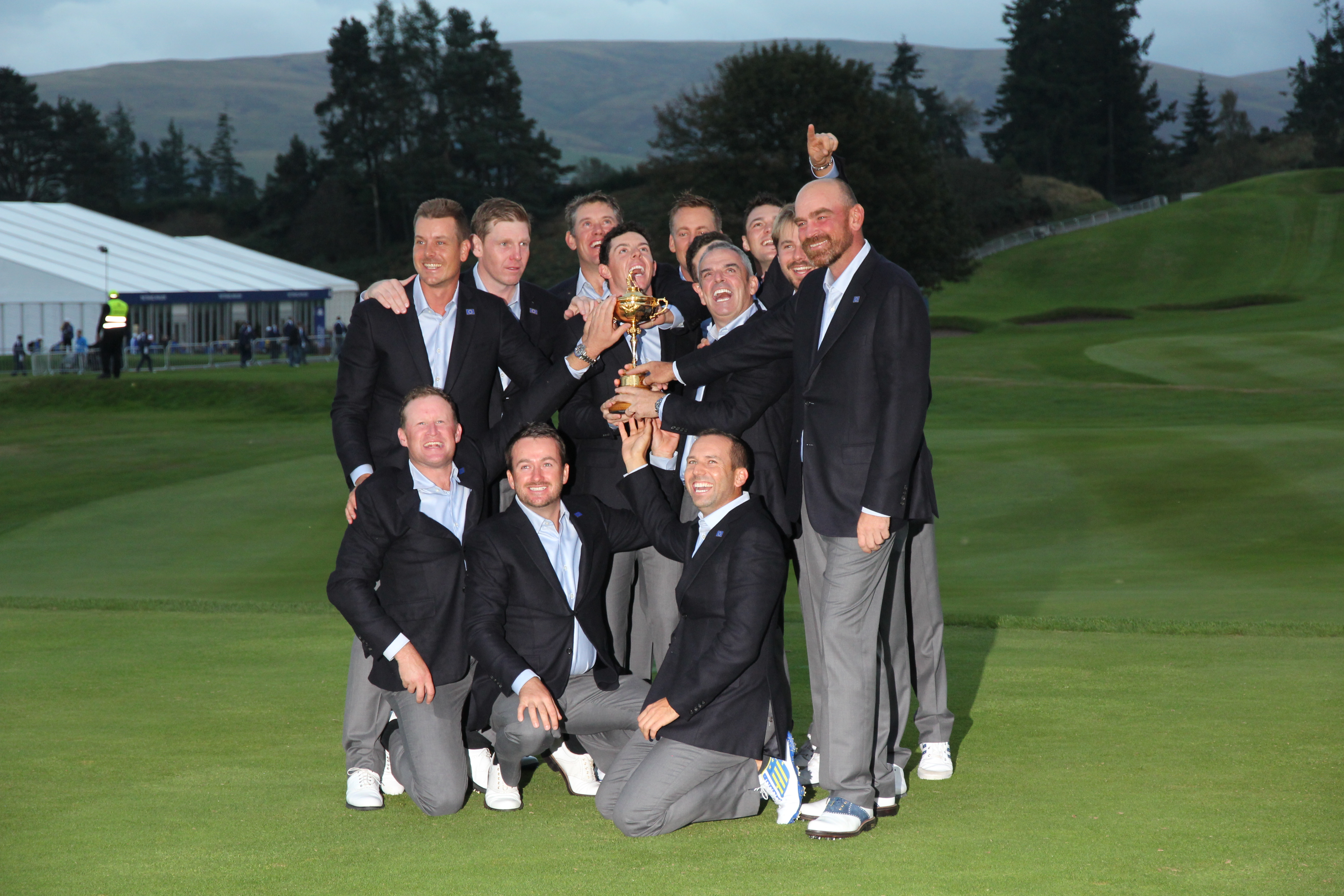
2014 European Ryder Cup team

Player	Points	Overall	Singles	Foursomes	Fourballs
Thomas Bjørn	0.5	0–2–1	0–1–0	0–0–0	0–1–1
Jamie Donaldson	3	3–1–0	1–0–0	2–0–0	0–1–0
Victor Dubuisson	2.5	2–0–1	0–0–1	2–0–0	0–0–0
Stephen Gallacher	0	0–2–0	0–1–0	0–0–0	0–1–0
Sergio García	2.5	2–1–1	1–0–0	1–0–1	0–1–0
Martin Kaymer	2	1–1–2	1–0–0	0–0–1	0–1–1
Graeme McDowell	3	3–0–0	1–0–0	2–0–0	0–0–0
Rory McIlroy	3	2–1–2	1–0–0	1–0–1	0–1–1
Ian Poulter	1	0–1–2	0–0–1	0–0–0	0–1–1
Justin Rose	4	3–0–2	0–0–1	1–0–1	2–0–0
Henrik Stenson	3	3–1–0	0–1–0	1–0–0	2–0–0
Lee Westwood	2	2–2–0	0–1–0	2–0–0	0–1–0

=== United States ===
Player	Points	Overall	Singles	Foursomes	Fourballs
Keegan Bradley	1	1–2–0	0–1–0	0–1–0	1–0–0
Rickie Fowler	1.5	0–2–3	0–1–0	0–1–1	0–0–2
Jim Furyk	1	1–3–0	0–1–0	0–2–0	1–0–0
Zach Johnson	0.5	0–2–1	0–0–1	0–2–0	0–0–0
Matt Kuchar	1	1–3–0	1–0–0	0–2–0	0–1–0
Hunter Mahan	1.5	1–2–1	0–0–1	0–2–0	1–0–0
Phil Mickelson	2	2–1–0	1–0–0	0–1–0	1–0–0
Patrick Reed	3.5	3–0–1	1–0–0	0–0–1	2–0–0
Webb Simpson	0.5	0–1–1	0–0–1	0–0–0	0–1–0
Jordan Spieth	2.5	2–1–1	0–1–0	0–0–1	2–0–0
Jimmy Walker	2.5	1–1–3	1–0–0	0–1–1	0–0–2
Bubba Watson	0	0–3–0	0–1–0	0–0–0	0–2–0
