= Jamie Donaldson =

Welsh professional golfer (born 1975)

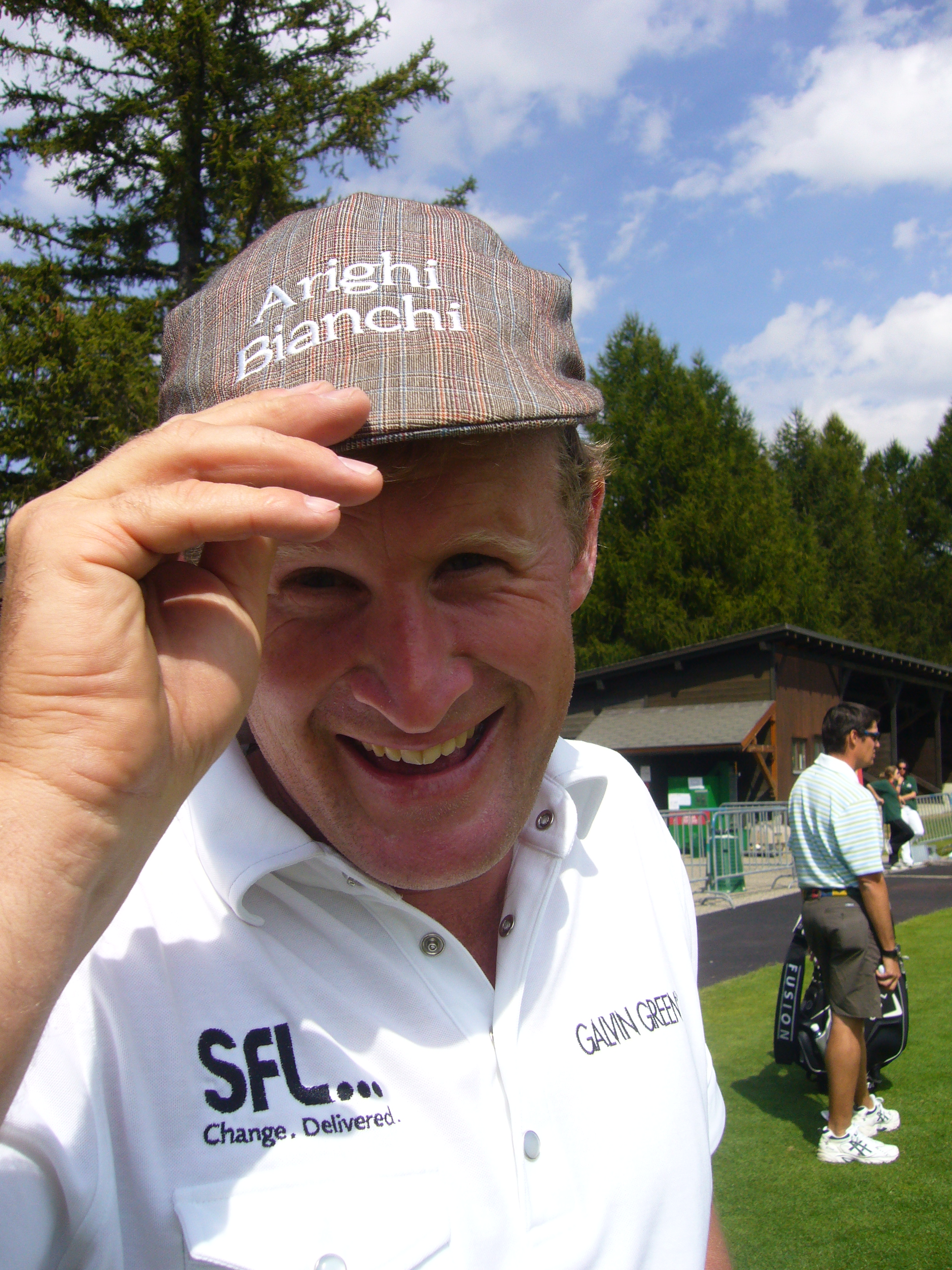
- Donaldson at 2008 Omega European Masters

Personal information
- Full name: James Ross Donaldson
- Nationality: Wales
- Born: 19 October 1975 (age 51) Pontypridd, Wales
- Height: 5 ft 11 in (1.80 m)
- Weight: 79 kg (174 lb; 12.4 st)

Career
- Sport: Golf
- Turned professional: 2000
- Current tour: European Senior Tour
- Former tours: PGA Tour; European Tour; Challenge Tour
- Professional wins: 11
- Highest ranking: 23 (23 November 2014)

Number of wins by tour
- European Tour: 3
- Asian Tour: 1
- Challenge Tour: 3
- European Senior Tour: 3
- Other: 1

Best results in major championships
- Masters Tournament: T14: 2014
- PGA Championship: T7: 2012
- U.S. Open: T32: 2013
- The Open Championship: T32: 2013

James Ross Donaldson (born 19 October 1975) is a Welsh professional golfer who plays on the European Tour.

== Career ==
Donaldson was born in Pontypridd. He turned professional in 2000. Having failed to come through the European Tour's qualifying school, in 2001 he played predominantly on the second tier Challenge Tour. He won the BMW Russian Open and the Telia Grand Prix in Sweden on his way to second place in the Challenge Tour Rankings. He also made the most of limited opportunities on the elite tour, making five cuts from seven events, with two top ten finishes, as he ended the season inside the top 100 on the Order of Merit to earn his European Tour card for 2002.

Donaldson spent the next few years playing on the European Tour, reaching a best of 58th on the final Order of Merit in 2003, but began to be troubled by back problems in 2004. In 2007 he was back on the Challenge Tour, but showed a return to form, picking up his third Challenge Tour win at the Abierto Telefonica de Guatemala on his way to 4th place on the end of season rankings. He was back on the European Tour in 2008 and was again inside the top 100 on the Order of Merit to maintain his playing rights for the 2009 season.

He has since performed consistently, finishing in the top 50 on the Order of Merit in both 2010 and 2011.

On 1 July 2012, Donaldson won his maiden European Tour title at The Irish Open at Royal Portrush, finishing 4 strokes ahead of three other players. Donaldson had held a two stroke advantage after 54 holes and pressed ahead earlier during his round with birdies at 2, 3 and 4. Despite two dropped shots on 11 and 16, he found five more birdies on the back nine to finish with a 66 and clinch the title. His first victory came at the 255th attempt and also made him the 10th Welshman to taste success on the European Tour.

Donaldson finished T7 at the 2012 PGA Championship. He finished the season ranked 19th on the Race to Dubai and he plans to join the PGA Tour for the 2013 season. The 2013 season will also mark Donaldson's first appearance at the Masters; he earned entry after finishing 2012 season ranked 47th in the Official World Golf Ranking.

In his second start of the 2013 season and thirteen events after his maiden victory, Donaldson won his second European Tour title at the Abu Dhabi HSBC Golf Championship. Starting the final round two back of Justin Rose, Donaldson made five birdies in seventeen holes to move two clear of the field, but a late bogey at the par five 18th hole meant a nervous wait to watch the final group come home. First Thorbjørn Olesen, then Rose had putts to force a playoff but both missed narrowly to see Donaldson to victory by one stroke. With the win, Donaldson became only the seventh Welshman to win multiple titles on the European Tour and it moved him inside the top 30 of the Official World Golf Ranking for the first time in his career. On 11 April, he became the fifth man in history to record a hole-in-one on the 6th hole at Augusta National Golf Club during the 2013 Masters Tournament. He finished the 2013 season ranked 5th on the Race to Dubai.

Donaldson played well enough on the 2014 PGA Tour as a non-member to earn a PGA Tour card for the 2014–15 season.

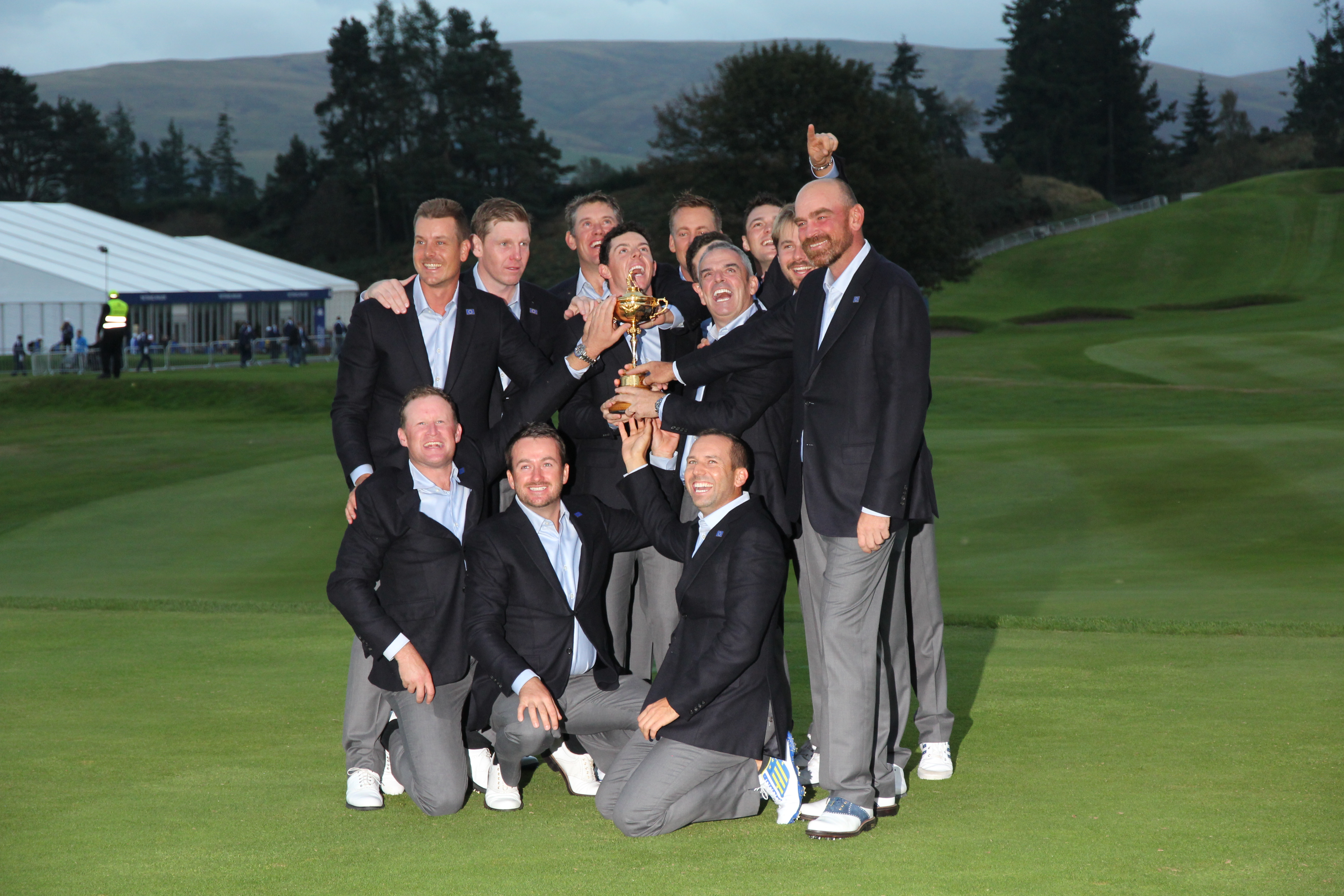
Donaldson seen front left of the 2014 European Ryder Cup team.

Donaldson secured the winning point for Europe in the 2014 Ryder Cup, with a wedge shot onto the 15th green, beating Keegan Bradley 4 & 3.

Just three years later, Donaldson was on the verge of losing his European Tour card. However, he finished fourth in the final event, the Andalucía Valderrama Masters, to move inside the top 101 of the Race to Dubai standings to secure his playing rights for the 2018 season.

== Amateur wins ==
- 1997 Welsh Amateur Championship
- 2000 Welsh Amateur Open Stroke Play Championship

== Professional wins (11) ==
=== European Tour wins (3) ===
| No. | Date | Tournament | Winning score | To par | Margin of victory | Runner(s)-up |
|---|---|---|---|---|---|---|
| 1 | 1 Jul 2012 | Irish Open | 68-67-69-66=270 | −18 | 4 strokes | (Spain) Rafa Cabrera-Bello, (England) Anthony Wall, (Paraguay) Fabrizio Zanotti |
| 2 | 20 Jan 2013 | Abu Dhabi HSBC Golf Championship | 67-70-69-68=274 | −14 | 1 stroke | (Denmark) Thorbjørn Olesen, (England) Justin Rose |
| 3 | 24 Aug 2014 | D+D Real Czech Masters | 66-69-71-68=274 | −14 | 2 strokes | (Wales) Bradley Dredge |

=== Asian Tour wins (1) ===
Legend
Flagship events (1)
Other Asian Tour (0)

| No. | Date | Tournament | Winning score | To par | Margin of victory | Runners-up |
|---|---|---|---|---|---|---|
| 1 | 13 Dec 2015 | Thailand Golf Championship | 63-68-71-65=267 | −21 | 3 strokes | (France) Clément Sordet, (England) Lee Westwood |

=== Challenge Tour wins (3) ===
| No. | Date | Tournament | Winning score | To par | Margin of victory | Runner(s)-up |
|---|---|---|---|---|---|---|
| 1 | 5 Aug 2001 | BMW Russian Open | 65-66-71-68=270 | −18 | 3 strokes | (England) Michael Archer, (Finland) Mikael Piltz |
| 2 | 16 Sep 2001 | Telia Grand Prix | 66-69-65-70=270 | −22 | Playoff | (Sweden) Magnus Persson Atlevi |
| 3 | 18 Feb 2007 | Abierto Telefónica de Guatemala^{1} | 63-65-69-68=265 | −23 | 1 stroke | (Argentina) Emilio Domínguez |

^{1}Co-sanctioned by the Tour de las Américas

Challenge Tour playoff record (1–0)

| No. | Year | Tournament | Opponent | Result |
|---|---|---|---|---|
| 1 | 2001 | Telia Grand Prix | (Sweden) Magnus Persson Atlevi | Won with par on third extra hole |

=== Other wins (1) ===
| No. | Date | Tournament | Winning score | To par | Margin of victory | Runner-up |
|---|---|---|---|---|---|---|
| 1 | 14 Dec 2008 | Mauritius Golf Open | 69-67-67=203 | −13 | 3 strokes | (France) Grégory Havret |

=== European Senior Tour wins (2) ===
| No. | Date | Tournament | Winning score | To par | Margin of victory | Runner(s)-up |
|---|---|---|---|---|---|---|
| 1 | 9 Nov 2025 | Champions UK plc European Senior Masters | 69-72-67=208 | −11 | 1 stroke | (Germany) Thomas Gögele, (Sweden) Mikael Lundberg, (England) Van Phillips |
| 2 | 22 Feb 2026 | Staysure Marbella Legends | 70-69-64=203 | −13 | 1 stroke | (Scotland) Stephen Gallacher |
| 3 | 22 Nov 2026 | Vietnam Legends Championship | 66-69-68=203 | −13 | 3 strokes | (India) Jeev Milkha Singh |

== Results in major championships ==
Results not in chronological order in 2020.

| Tournament | 2006 | 2007 | 2008 | 2009 |
|---|---|---|---|---|
| Masters Tournament | | | | |
| U.S. Open | | | | |
| The Open Championship | CUT | | | |
| PGA Championship | | | | |

| Tournament | 2010 | 2011 | 2012 | 2013 | 2014 | 2015 | 2016 | 2017 | 2018 |
|---|---|---|---|---|---|---|---|---|---|
| Masters Tournament | | | | CUT | T14 | T33 | T21 | | |
| U.S. Open | | | | T32 | CUT | CUT | CUT | | |
| The Open Championship | | | T60 | T32 | CUT | T49 | T72 | | |
| PGA Championship | | CUT | T7 | WD | T24 | WD | T42 | | |

| Tournament | 2019 | 2020 | 2021 | 2022 |
|---|---|---|---|---|
| Masters Tournament | | | | |
| PGA Championship | | | | |
| U.S. Open | | | | |
| The Open Championship | | NT | | CUT |

Top 10
Did not play

CUT = missed the half-way cut
WD = withdrew
"T" = tied
NT = No tournament due to the COVID-19 pandemic

=== Summary ===
| Tournament | Wins | 2nd | 3rd | Top-5 | Top-10 | Top-25 | Events | Cuts made |
|---|---|---|---|---|---|---|---|---|
| Masters Tournament | 0 | 0 | 0 | 0 | 0 | 2 | 4 | 3 |
| U.S. Open | 0 | 0 | 0 | 0 | 0 | 0 | 4 | 1 |
| The Open Championship | 0 | 0 | 0 | 0 | 0 | 0 | 7 | 4 |
| PGA Championship | 0 | 0 | 0 | 0 | 1 | 2 | 6 | 3 |
| Totals | 0 | 0 | 0 | 0 | 1 | 4 | 21 | 11 |

- Most consecutive cuts made – 2 (four times)
- Longest streak of top-10s – 1

== Results in The Players Championship ==
| Tournament | 2014 | 2015 |
|---|---|---|
| The Players Championship | T38 | T8 |

Top 10

"T" indicates a tie for a place

== Results in World Golf Championships ==
Results not in chronological order before 2015.

| Tournament | 2012 | 2013 | 2014 | 2015 | 2016 |
|---|---|---|---|---|---|
| Championship | | T63 | T2 | T44 | T35 |
| Match Play | | R64 | R64 | T17 | T18 |
| Invitational | T36 | T17 | T37 | T50 | |
| Champions | T42 | T8 | T24 | | |

Top 10
Did not play

QF, R16, R32, R64 = Round in which player lost in match play
"T" = tied

== Team appearances ==
Amateur

- European Youths' Team Championship (representing Wales): 1996
- European Amateur Team Championship (representing Wales): 1997, 1999
- Bonallack Trophy (representing Europe): 1998 (winners)
- Eisenhower Trophy (representing Great Britain & Ireland): 2000
- St Andrews Trophy (representing Great Britain & Ireland): 2000 (winners)

Professional

- World Cup (representing Wales): 2009, 2011
- Seve Trophy (representing Great Britain & Ireland): 2011 (winners), 2013
- EurAsia Cup (representing Europe): 2014
- Ryder Cup (representing Europe): 2014 (winners)

== See also ==
- 2007 Challenge Tour graduates
