= 2000 Eisenhower Trophy =

Coordinates: 52.239°N 14.029°E

Tournament information
- Dates: 31 August – 3 September
- Location: Bad Saarow, Germany
- Courses: Sporting Club Berlin (Faldo and Palmer courses)
- Format: 72 holes stroke play

Statistics
- Par: 72 (Faldo); 72 (Palmer)
- Field: 59 teams 236 players

Champion
- United States; Ben Curtis, David Eger, Bryce Molder & Jeff Quinney
- 841 (−23)

The 2000 Eisenhower Trophy took place 31 August to 3 September on the Nick Faldo and Arnold Palmer courses at Sporting Club Berlin in Bad Saarow, Germany. It was the 22nd World Amateur Team Championship for the Eisenhower Trophy. The tournament was a 72-hole stroke play team event with 59 four-man teams. The best three scores for each round counted towards the team total. Each team played two rounds on the two courses. The leading teams played on the Arnold Palmer course on the third day and on the Nick Faldo course on the final day.

United States won the Eisenhower Trophy for the 11th time, finishing 16 strokes ahead of the silver medalists, Great Britain and Ireland. Australia took the bronze medal with Sweden in fourth place. Bryce Molder had the lowest individual score, 15-under-par 273, four strokes better than Paul Casey.

This was the last World Amateur Team Championship with teams of four; subsequent championships had teams of three with the best two scores for each round counting. It was also the last time that there was a Great Britain and Ireland team. From 2002, England, Scotland, Wales, and Ireland (a combined Republic of Ireland and Northern Ireland team) competed as separate teams.

== Teams ==
59 four-man teams contested the event.

The following table lists the players on the leading teams.

Country	Players
Australia	Aaron Baddeley, Scott Gardiner, Brad Lamb, Andrew Webster
Canada	Derek Gillespie, Wes Heffernan, Calvin Kupeyan, Jon Mills
Denmark	Peter Jespersen, Allan Högh Madsen, Søren Müller, Lars Storm
Finland	Mikko Ilonen, Toni Karjalainen, Panu Kylliäinen, Tuomas Tuovinen
Germany	Jochen Lupprian, Tino Schuster, Marcel Siem, Michael Thannhäuser
Great Britain & Ireland	Paul Casey, Luke Donald, Jamie Donaldson, Steven O'Hara
Italy	Edoardo Molinari, Joachim Hassan, Stefano Reale, Massimiliano Secci
New Zealand	Richard Best, Carl Brooking, Gareth Paddison, Reon Sayer
Sweden	Anders Hultman, Pär Nilsson, Carl Pettersson, Rickard Sundgren
United States	Ben Curtis, David Eger, Bryce Molder, Jeff Quinney

== Scores ==
Place	Country	Score	To par
1st place, gold medalist(s)	United States	207-216-205-213=841	−23
2nd place, silver medalist(s)	Great Britain & Ireland	213-214-210-220=857	−7
3rd place, bronze medalist(s)	Australia	213-213-212-220=858	−6
4	Sweden	219-213-210-220=862	−2
5	Germany	218-206-211-230=865	+1
6	New Zealand	216-219-212-219=866	+2
7	Denmark	215-217-209-226=867	+3
8	Italy	219-219-213-220=871	+7
9	Finland	222-209-215-226=872	+8
10	Canada	207-220-214-234=875	+11
11	Netherlands	220-219-213-227=879	+15
12	Colombia	216-219-216-229=880	+16
13	France	216-222-219-224=881	+17
T14	Japan	219-214-221-228=882	+18
T14	South Africa	211-219-225-227=882	+18
16	Belgium	232-209-216-226=883	+19
17	South Korea	222-217-220-226=885	+21
T18	Argentina	217-215-220-237=889	+25
T18	Norway	226-218-216-229=889	+25
T20	Chile	221-221-222-228=892	+28
T20	Chinese Taipei	222-219-224-227=892	+28
T20	Iceland	220-224-214-234=892	+28
T20	Switzerland	220-221-221-230=892	+28
T24	India	212-225-223-234=894	+30
T24	Zimbabwe	226-219-224-225=894	+30
T26	Austria	225-231-216-224=896	+32
T26	Spain	233-218-218-227=896	+32
T26	Venezuela	219-227-225-225=896	+32
29	Portugal	232-215-218-232=897	+33
30	Mexico	226-218-225-232=901	+37
31	Slovenia	222-226-229-231=908	+44
32	Philippines	232-225-223-229=909	+45
33	Malaysia	227-225-230-228=910	+46
34	Brazil	232-223-234-222=911	+47
35	Czech Republic	231-224-234-223=912	+48
36	Paraguay	230-222-229-235=916	+52
37	Morocco	232-226-234-235=927	+63
38	Hong Kong	234-233-230-237=934	+70
T39	Pakistan	232-230-238-237=937	+73
T39	Puerto Rico	233-232-239-233=937	+73
41	Bahamas	224-237-241-242=944	+80
42	Ecuador	238-230-245-232=945	+81
43	Russia	242-243-235-230=950	+86
44	Bahrain	242-233-236-245=956	+92
45	Bolivia	235-231-249-244=959	+95
T46	Guatemala	236-235-248-243=962	+98
T46	Lebanon	241-236-246-239=962	+98
48	Greece	248-237-236-243=964	+100
49	Bermuda	240-234-243-250=967	+103
50	El Salvador	239-243-254-240=976	+112
51	United Arab Emirates	244-245-241-247=977	+113
52	Costa Rica	248-236-252-246=982	+118
53	Luxembourg	251-244-249-241=985	+121
54	Israel	252-245-249-246=992	+128
55	Tunisia	242-244-257-250=993	+129
56	Latvia	247-252-254-251=1004	+140
57	Croatia	252-254-265-247=1018	+154
58	Estonia	248-248-263-262=1021	+157
59	Slovakia	257-259-271-265=1052	+188

== Individual leaders ==
There was no official recognition for the lowest individual scores.

Place	Player	Country	Score	To par
1	Bryce Molder	United States	69-71-65-68=273	−15
2	Paul Casey	Great Britain & Ireland	66-69-68-74=277	−11
3	Scott Gardiner	Australia	70-71-69-71=281	−7
4	Stefano Reale	Italy	71-72-68-72=283	−5
5	David Eger	United States	67-73-69-75=284	−4
T6	Ben Curtis	United States	71-73-73-70=287	−1
T6	Tino Schuster	Germany	73-70-70-74=287	−1
T8	Óscar David Álvarez	Colombia	73-75-70-70=288	E
T8	Guido van der Valk	Netherlands	75-73-67-73=288	E
T10	Luke Donald	Great Britain & Ireland	73-73-71-72=289	+1
T10	Anders Hultman	Sweden	71-75-71-72=289	+1
T10	Kim Dae-sub	South Korea	72-75-70-72=289	+1
T10	Søren Müller	Denmark	73-73-68-75=289	+1
T10	Reon Sayer	New Zealand	73-70-70-76=289	+1
