= Alexander Lévy =

French professional golfer (born 1990)

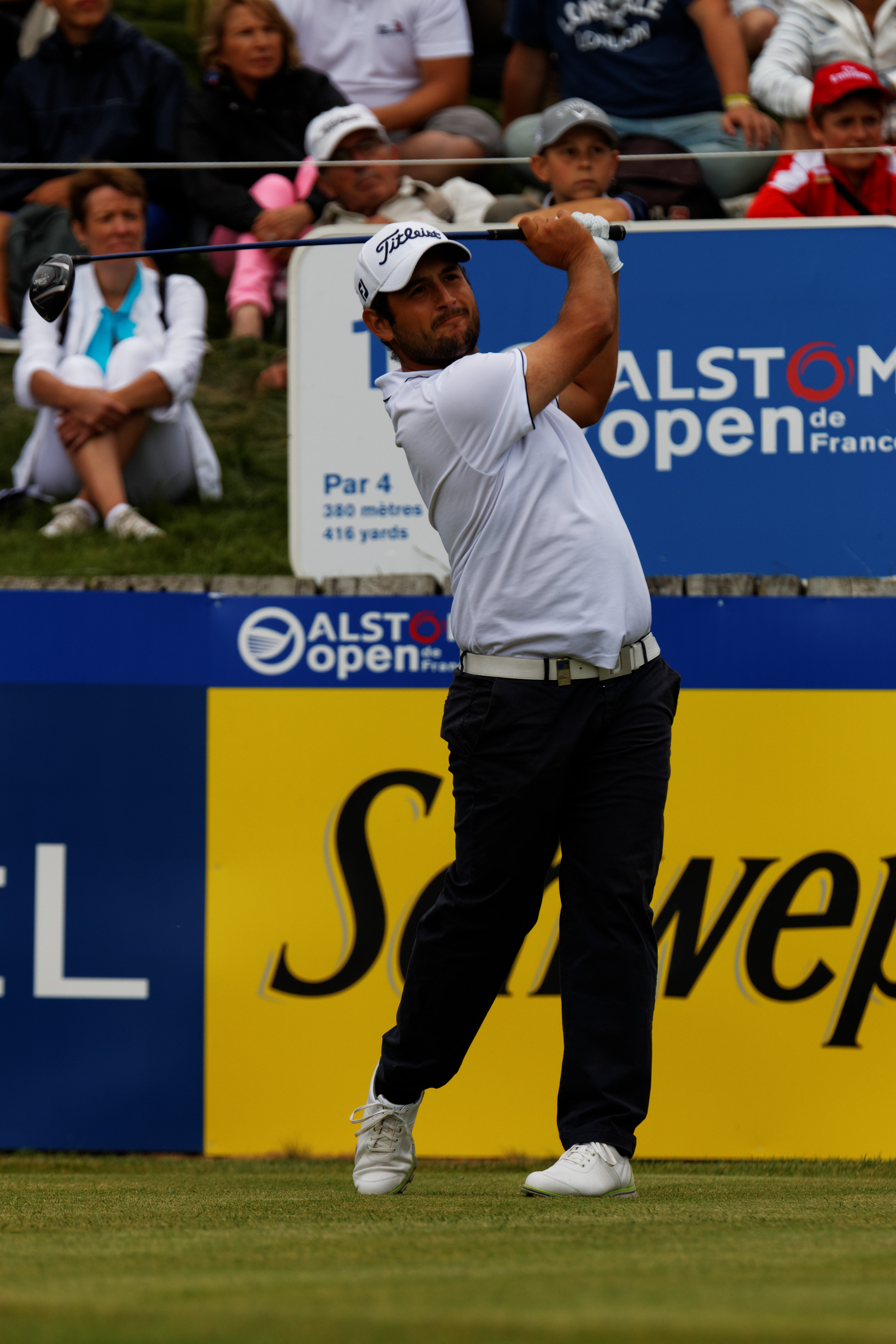

Personal information
- Nickname: El Toro
- Nationality: France
- Born: 1 August 1990 (age 36) Orange, California, U.S.
- Height: 1.78 m (5 ft 10 in)
- Weight: 82 kg (181 lb; 12.9 st)

Career
- Sport: Golf
- Turned professional: 2011
- Current tour: European Tour
- Former tour: Challenge Tour
- Professional wins: 5
- Highest ranking: 46 (6 May 2018)

Number of wins by tour
- European Tour: 5
- Other: 2

Best results in major championships
- Masters Tournament: DNP
- PGA Championship: T30: 2014
- U.S. Open: T27: 2015
- The Open Championship: CUT: 2015, 2017, 2018, 2019

Alexander Lévy (French pronunciation: [le.vi]; born 1 August 1990) is a French professional golfer who currently plays on the European Tour. Lévy won the French Amateur Championship in 2009, and the French International Amateur Championship the next year. Turning pro in 2011, his first wins of the European Tour came in 2014 at the Volvo China Open and the Portugal Masters. He won a title each year between 2016 and 2018 : the 2016 Porsche European Open, the 2017 Volvo China Open and the Trophee Hassan II in 2018. He rose to 47th in the world following this last victory. At a nationwide level, only fellow countryman Thomas Levet is in possession of more titles on the European Tour (6), Levy currently trails Levet by one.

== Early life ==
Levy was born to French parents on 1 August 1990 in Orange, California. He is Jewish. His father (Philippe) and mother are pharmacists.

When he was four years old, his family moved to Bandol, France, where he resides. At 14 years of age, he joined the French Federation of Golf's academy for secondary school. His nickname is El Toro.

== Amateur career ==
Lévy had a successful amateur career before turning professional, winning the French Amateur Championship in 2009 and the French International Amateur Championship the next year, when he was also a member of the winning French team at the Eisenhower Trophy World Team Championship.

== Professional career ==
In 2011, Lévy turned professional. He initially played on the Challenge Tour as an invited player in 2011 and 2012 before earning his European Tour playing rights at qualifying school for the 2013 season.

His first win of the European Tour came at the Volvo China Open in 2014, an event co-sanctioned with the OneAsia Tour, where he shot a 19-under-par 269. During the second round, Lévy shot a course record 62 at Genzon Golf Club giving him a four-stroke lead at the halfway point from which he was able to hold on to win. Following this win Levy was named as April 2014 European Tour Golfer of the Month

His first appearance in a major championship was at the 2014 PGA Championship. In October 2014, Lévy claimed his second European Tour win at the Portugal Masters in an event which was shortened to 36 holes due to adverse weather conditions. With his win, he became the first French golfer to win more than once in the same season.

In winning the 2016 Porsche European Open at Bad Griesbach, Germany, at the age of 26 years and 55 days, Lévy became the youngest Frenchman in history to win three European Tour titles.

Lévy again won the Volvo China Open in 2017, becoming the first two-time winner of the event in its 23-year history.

Lévy spent nearly ten months away from the game in 2022–2023 due to a severe lower back injury.

== Amateur wins ==
- 2009 French Native Amateur Championship
- 2010 French International Amateur Championship

== Professional wins (5) ==
=== European Tour wins (5) ===
No.	Date	Tournament	Winning score	Margin of victory	Runner-up
1	27 Apr 2014	Volvo China Open^{1}	−19 (68-62-70-69=269)	4 strokes	(England) Tommy Fleetwood
2	12 Oct 2014	Portugal Masters	−18 (63-61=124) (Note: Shortened to 36/54 holes due to weather.)	3 strokes	(Belgium) Nicolas Colsaerts
3	25 Sep 2016	Porsche European Open	−19 (62-63-69=194)	Playoff	(England) Ross Fisher
4	30 Apr 2017	Volvo China Open^{1} (2)	−17 (63-70-71-67=271)	Playoff	(South Africa) Dylan Frittelli
5	22 Apr 2018	Trophée Hassan II	−8 (72-69-69-70=280)	1 stroke	(Spain) Álvaro Quirós

^{1}Co-sanctioned by the OneAsia Tour

European Tour playoff record (2–2)

No.	Year	Tournament	Opponent(s)	Result
1	2014	BMW Masters	(England) Ross Fisher, (Germany) Marcel Siem	Siem won with birdie on first extra hole
2	2016	Porsche European Open	(England) Ross Fisher	Won with birdie on second extra hole
3	2017	Volvo China Open	(South Africa) Dylan Frittelli	Won with birdie on first extra hole
4	2017	Porsche European Open	(England) Jordan Smith	Lost to birdie on second extra hole

== Results in major championships ==
Tournament	2014	2015	2016	2017	2018
Masters Tournament					
U.S. Open		T27		CUT	CUT
The Open Championship		CUT		CUT	CUT
PGA Championship	T30	CUT		CUT	CUT

Tournament	2019
Masters Tournament	
PGA Championship	
U.S. Open	
The Open Championship	CUT

Did not play

CUT = missed the half-way cut
"T" indicates a tie for a place

== Results in World Golf Championships ==
Results not in chronological order before 2015.

Tournament	2014	2015	2016	2017	2018
Championship		T38			
Match Play		T52			T36
Invitational	T58				
Champions	T14		T58	T31	T28

Did not play

QF, R16, R32, R64 = Round in which player lost in match play
"T" = tied

== Team appearances ==
Amateur

- European Boys' Team Championship (representing France): 2008
- European Amateur Team Championship (representing France): 2009, 2010, 2011 (winners)
- Eisenhower Trophy (representing France): 2010 (winners)

Professional

- EurAsia Cup (representing Europe): 2018 (winners)
- World Cup (representing France): 2018

== See also ==
- 2012 European Tour Qualifying School graduates
- 2024 Challenge Tour graduates
- List of Jewish golfers
