= 2014 EurAsia Cup =

- Dates: 27–29 March 2014
- Venue: Glenmarie Golf and Country Club
- Location: Shah Alam, Selangor, Malaysia
- Captains: Thongchai Jaidee (Asia); Miguel Ángel Jiménez (Europe)
Asia	10	10	Europe
- A tie in the EurAsia Cup

The 2014 EurAsia Cup presented by DRB-HICOM was the first edition of the EurAsia Cup, a team golf event contested between teams representing Asia and Europe. It was held from 27 to 29 March at the Glenmarie Golf and Country Club in Shah Alam, Selangor, Malaysia. The match ended in a 10–10 tie and, under the rules of the inaugural event, the Cup was shared between the teams.

The event had a $4,000,000 purse; $300,000 to each member of the winning team and $100,000 to each member of the losing team.

== Teams ==
Asia		Europe	
Player	Country	Player	Country
Thongchai Jaidee; Playing captain	Thailand	Miguel Ángel Jiménez; Playing captain	Spain
Boonchu Ruangkit; Non-playing vice-captain	Thailand	Des Smyth; Non-playing vice-captain	Ireland
Kiradech Aphibarnrat	Thailand	Thomas Bjørn	Denmark
Gaganjeet Bhullar	India	Jamie Donaldson	Wales
Nicholas Fung	Malaysia	Victor Dubuisson	France
Kim Hyung-sung	South Korea	Gonzalo Fernández-Castaño	Spain
Anirban Lahiri	India	Stephen Gallacher	Scotland
Prayad Marksaeng	Thailand	Pablo Larrazábal	Spain
Koumei Oda	Japan	Joost Luiten	Netherlands
Siddikur Rahman	Bangladesh	Graeme McDowell	Northern Ireland
Hideto Tanihara	Japan	Thorbjørn Olesen	Denmark

The Asian team consisted of (a) the captain, (b) the leading four members on the final 2013 Asian Tour Order of Merit: Aphibarnrat (1), Lahiri (3), Rahman (4) and Bhullar (5) (c) the leading three members, not already entered, on the Official World Golf Ranking as published on 2 February 2014: Kim (70), Oda (76), Tanihara (101), (d) two captain's choices. Jaidee chose Fung and Marksaeng.

The European team consisted of (a) the leading four members on the final 2013 Race to Dubai: McDowell (4), Donaldson (5), Dubuisson (6) and Fernández-Castaño (7) (b) the leading four members, not already entered, on the Official World Golf Ranking as published on 2 February 2014: Bjørn (24), Gallacher (37), Jiménez (39) and Luiten (43), (c) the captain, (d) a captain's choice. Since Jiménez qualified through (b) he was able to choose a second member. He chose Larrazábal and Olesen.

== Schedule ==
- 27 March (Thursday) Four-ball x 5
- 28 March (Friday) Foursomes x 5
- 29 March (Saturday) Singles x 10

== Thursday's matches (four-ball) ==
Asia	Results	Europe
Jaidee/Aphibarnrat	2 & 1	Jiménez/Larrazábal
Oda/Tanihara	2 up	Bjørn/Olesen
Marksaeng/Siddikur	3 & 2	Dubuisson/Luiten
Bhullar/Lahiri	4 & 3	Fdez-Castaño/Gallacher
Kim/Fung	3 and 1	McDowell/Donaldson
0	Session	5
0	Overall	5

== Friday's matches (foursomes) ==
Asia	Results	Europe
Jaidee/Aphibarnrat	halved	Jiménez/Larrazábal
Marksaeng/Kim	4 & 3	Bjørn/Olesen
Oda/Tanihara	halved	Fdez-Castaño/Gallacher
Lahiri/Siddikur	1 up	Luiten/Dubuisson
Bhullar/Fung	2 & 1	McDowell/Donaldson
3	Session	2
3	Overall	7

== Saturday's matches (singles) ==
Asia	Results	Europe
Fung	1 up	Jiménez
Jaidee	3 & 2	McDowell
Aphibarnrat	2 & 1	Bjørn
Marksaeng	halved	Donaldson
Kim	4 & 2	Larrazábal
Lahiri	2 & 1	Dubuisson
Bhullar	5 & 3	Olesen
Oda	1 up	Luiten
Tanihara	halved	Fdez-Castaño
Siddikur	4 & 3	Gallacher
7	Session	3
10	Overall	10
