= BMW Masters =

Golf tournament

Coordinates: 31.404°N 121.370°E

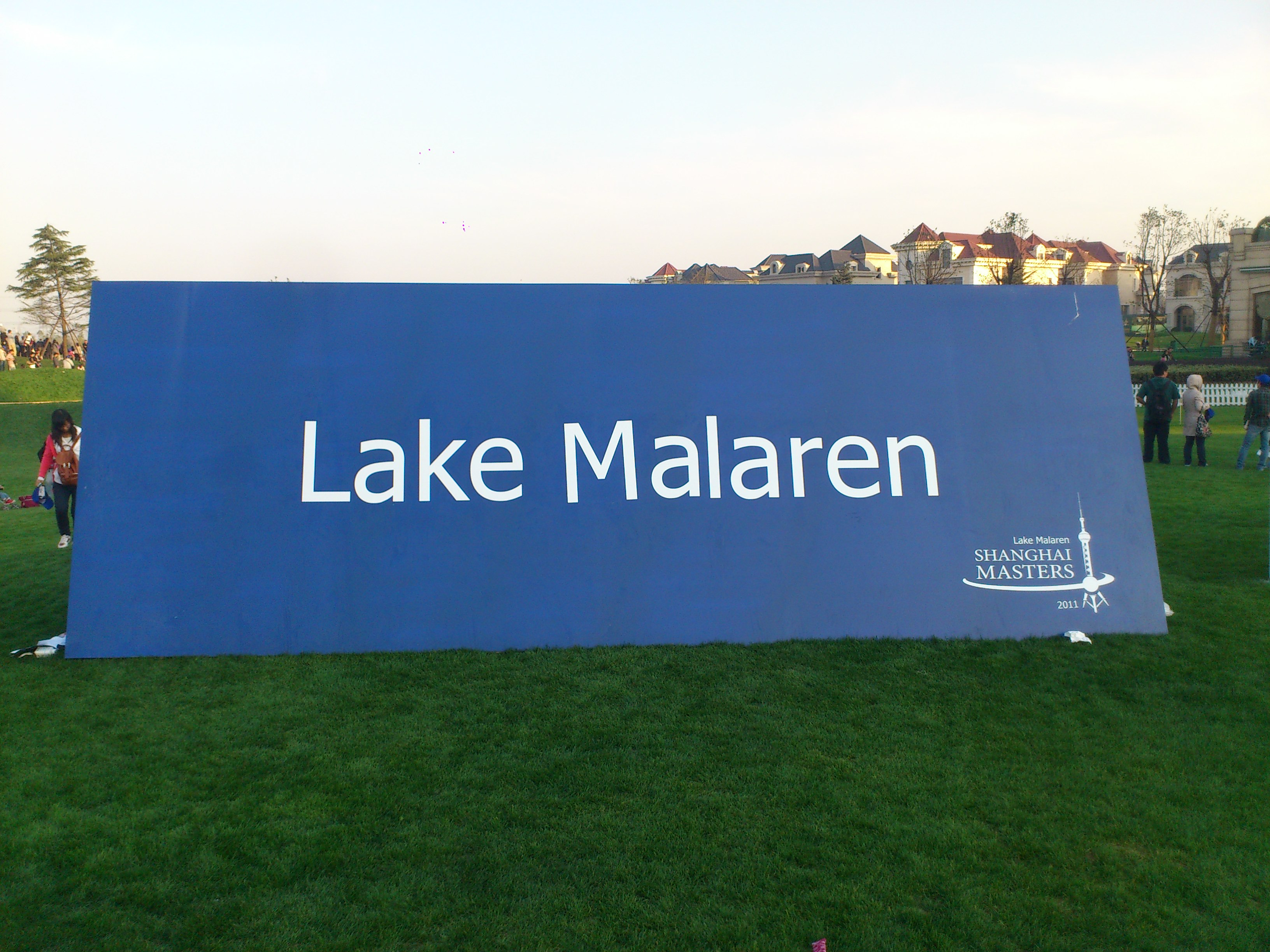

Tournament information
- Location: Luodian, Shanghai, China
- Established: 2011
- Course: Lake Malaren Golf Club
- Par: 72
- Length: 7,594 yards (6,944 m)
- Tour: European Tour
- Format: Stroke play
- Prize fund: US$7,000,000
- Month played: November
- Final year: 2015

Tournament record score
- Aggregate: 267 Peter Hanson (2012)
- To par: −21 as above

Final champion
- (Sweden) Kristoffer Broberg
- Location in China

The BMW Masters was a golf tournament played annually at Lake Malaren Golf Club, in Luodian, Shanghai, China. The tournament began in 2011 and became a European Tour event in 2012. It was dropped from the European Tour in 2016.

In 2011, the tournament was called the Lake Malaren Shanghai Masters. The event had a small field consisting of 30 top players from the European Tour and the Asian Tour. The winner received US$2 million, the largest first prize in golf, coming from an overall prize fund of $5 million.

In 2012, it became a European Tour event and was renamed the BMW Masters. The field was expanded to 78 players and the purse was increased to US$7 million. From 2013 to 2015, the tournament was part of the European Tour Final Series.

== Winners ==
European Tour (Race to Dubai finals series)	2013–2015
European Tour (Regular)	2012
Unofficial event	2011

#	Year	Winner	Score	To par	Margin of victory	Runner(s)-up
BMW Masters
5th	2015	(Sweden) Kristoffer Broberg	271	−17	Playoff	(United States) Patrick Reed
4th	2014	(Germany) Marcel Siem	272	−16	Playoff	(England) Ross Fisher (France) Alexander Lévy
3rd	2013	(Spain) Gonzalo Fernández-Castaño	277	−11	1 stroke	(Italy) Francesco Molinari (Thailand) Thongchai Jaidee
2nd	2012	(Sweden) Peter Hanson	267	−21	1 stroke	(Northern Ireland) Rory McIlroy
Lake Malaren Shanghai Masters
1st	2011	(Northern Ireland) Rory McIlroy	270	−18	Playoff	(United States) Anthony Kim
