= Marcel Siem =

German professional golfer

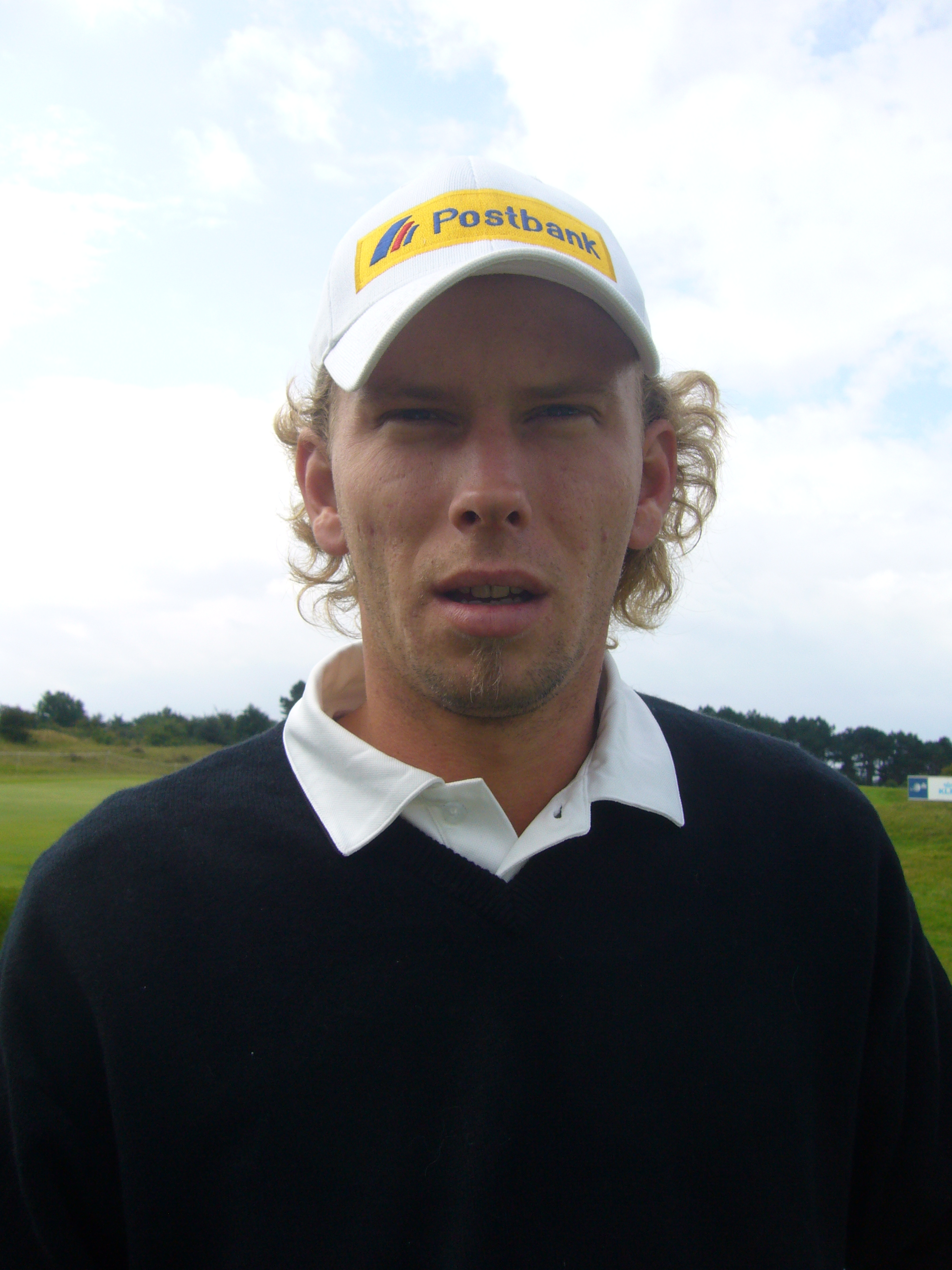
- Siem at the 2008 KLM Open

Personal information
- Nationality: Germany
- Born: 15 July 1980 (age 46) Mettmann, Germany
- Height: 1.89 m (6 ft 2 in)
- Weight: 75 kg (165 lb)
- Spouse: Laura
- Children: 2

Career
- Sport: Golf
- Turned professional: 2000
- Current tour: European Tour
- Former tour: Challenge Tour
- Professional wins: 8
- Highest ranking: 48 (7 April 2013)

Number of wins by tour
- European Tour: 6
- Sunshine Tour: 1
- Challenge Tour: 1
- Other: 1

Best results in major championships
- Masters Tournament: DNP
- PGA Championship: T36: 2012
- U.S. Open: T12: 2014
- The Open Championship: T15: 2021

Marcel Siem (born 15 July 1980) is a German professional golfer who plays on the European Tour where he has six victories. In 2006 he won the World Cup paired with Bernhard Langer.

== Career ==
Siem was born in Mettmann, Germany. In 2000, Siem turned professional and came through Qualifying School to join the European Tour in 2002. He was again successful at Qualifying School in 2002. His first win on the European Tour came at the 2004 Dunhill Championship. Siem then had to wait eight years before picking up his second win in 2012 at the Alstom Open de France. This victory ensured Siem's place in the 2012 Open Championship and his first appearance in a World Golf Championship at the WGC-Bridgestone Invitational. His best year end ranking on the Order of Merit was 14th in 2012.

In March 2013, Siem won for the third time on the European Tour at the Trophée Hassan II in Morocco. He went wire-to-wire to win by three strokes over David Horsey and Mikko Ilonen. He finished the tournament 51st in the world rankings, just missing out on an invitation to the Masters Tournament.

In November 2014, Siem claimed victory at the BMW Masters, the first event of the Race to Dubai finals series and his fourth overall on the European Tour. He won in a sudden death playoff over Ross Fisher and Alexander Lévy with a birdie on the first extra hole. He ended the season 7th in the Race to Dubai season rankings.

Siem played on the Challenge Tour in 2021. He won the Le Vaudreuil Golf Challenge in July.

At the end of 2022 Siem relocated to Mauritius and experienced a resurgence of form. In February 2023, he ended an eight-year winless drought at the Hero Indian Open in his 501st European Tour start. He shot a final-round 68 to beat Yannik Paul by one shot. In June, he was runner-up at the Porsche European Open in Hamburg, two shots behind Tom McKibbin.

Siem has represented Germany at the World Cup in 2003, 2004, and 2006. In 2006 he was Bernhard Langer's teammate in the second winning German team in the World Cup.

== Amateur wins ==
- 1999 Sherry Cup

== Professional wins (8) ==
=== European Tour wins (6) ===
Legend
Race to Dubai finals series (1)
Other European Tour (5)

No.	Date	Tournament	Winning score	Margin of victory	Runner(s)-up
1	25 Jan 2004	Dunhill Championship^{1}	−22 (65-67-68-66=266)	Playoff	(France) Grégory Havret, (France) Raphaël Jacquelin
2	8 Jul 2012	Alstom Open de France	−8 (68-68-73-67=276)	1 stroke	(Italy) Francesco Molinari
3	31 Mar 2013	Trophée Hassan II	−17 (64-68-69-70=271)	3 strokes	(England) David Horsey, (Finland) Mikko Ilonen
4	2 Nov 2014	BMW Masters	−16 (68-66-65-73=272)	Playoff	(England) Ross Fisher, (France) Alexander Lévy
5	26 Feb 2023	Hero Indian Open^{2}	−14 (69-70-67-68=274)	1 stroke	(Germany) Yannik Paul
6	30 Jun 2024	Italian Open	−10 (69-68-66-71=274)	Playoff	(Northern Ireland) Tom McKibbin

^{1}Co-sanctioned by the Sunshine Tour
^{2}Co-sanctioned by the Professional Golf Tour of India

European Tour playoff record (3–0)

No.	Year	Tournament	Opponent(s)	Result
1	2004	Dunhill Championship	(France) Grégory Havret, (France) Raphaël Jacquelin	Won with birdie on third extra hole Havret eliminated by birdie on second hole
2	2014	BMW Masters	(England) Ross Fisher, (France) Alexander Lévy	Won with birdie on first extra hole
3	2024	Italian Open	(Northern Ireland) Tom McKibbin	Won with birdie on first extra hole

=== Challenge Tour wins (1) ===
No.	Date	Tournament	Winning score	Margin of victory	Runner-up
1	11 Jul 2021	Le Vaudreuil Golf Challenge	−15 (71-62-69-67=269)	1 stroke	(Chile) Hugo León

=== Other wins (1) ===
Legend
World Golf Championships (1)
Other wins (0)

No.	Date	Tournament	Winning score	Margin of victory	Runners-up
1	10 Dec 2006	WGC-World Cup (with (Germany) Bernhard Langer)	−16 (65-69-68-66=268)	Playoff	Scotland − Colin Montgomerie and Marc Warren

Other playoff record (1–0)

No.	Year	Tournament	Opponents	Result
1	2006	WGC-World Cup (with (Germany) Bernhard Langer)	Scotland − Colin Montgomerie and Marc Warren	Won with par on first extra hole

== Results in major championships ==
Tournament	2010	2011	2012	2013	2014	2015	2016	2017	2018
Masters Tournament									
U.S. Open		T60		T59	T12	CUT			
The Open Championship	T27		CUT	CUT		CUT			
PGA Championship			T36	CUT		T48			

Tournament	2019	2020	2021	2022	2023	2024
Masters Tournament						
PGA Championship						
U.S. Open						
The Open Championship		NT	T15		T41	T72

Did not play

CUT = missed the half-way cut
"T" = tied
NT = no tournament due to COVID-19 pandemic

=== Summary ===
Tournament	Wins	2nd	3rd	Top-5	Top-10	Top-25	Events	Cuts made
Masters Tournament	0	0	0	0	0	0	0	0
PGA Championship	0	0	0	0	0	0	3	2
U.S. Open	0	0	0	0	0	1	4	3
The Open Championship	0	0	0	0	0	1	7	4
Totals	0	0	0	0	0	2	14	9

- Most consecutive cuts made – 4 (2015 PGA – 2024 Open Championship, current)
- Longest streak of top-10s – 0

== Results in World Golf Championships ==
Results not in chronological order before 2015.

Tournament	2012	2013	2014	2015
Championship		T39		T38
Match Play		R64		
Invitational	T60			T37
Champions	T11		T48	

Did not play

QF, R16, R32, R64 = Round in which player lost in match play
"T" = tied

== Team appearances ==
Amateur

- European Boys' Team Championship (representing Germany): 1997
- European Youths' Team Championship (representing Germany): 1998
- Eisenhower Trophy (representing Germany): 1998, 2000
- European Amateur Team Championship (representing Germany): 1999

Professional

- World Cup (representing Germany): 2003, 2004, 2006 (winners), 2013
- Royal Trophy (representing Europe): 2012

== See also ==
- 2007 European Tour Qualifying School graduates
- 2021 Challenge Tour graduates
- 2022 European Tour Qualifying School graduates
