= Stephen Gallacher =

Scottish professional golfer (born 1974)

Stephen Gallacher MBE
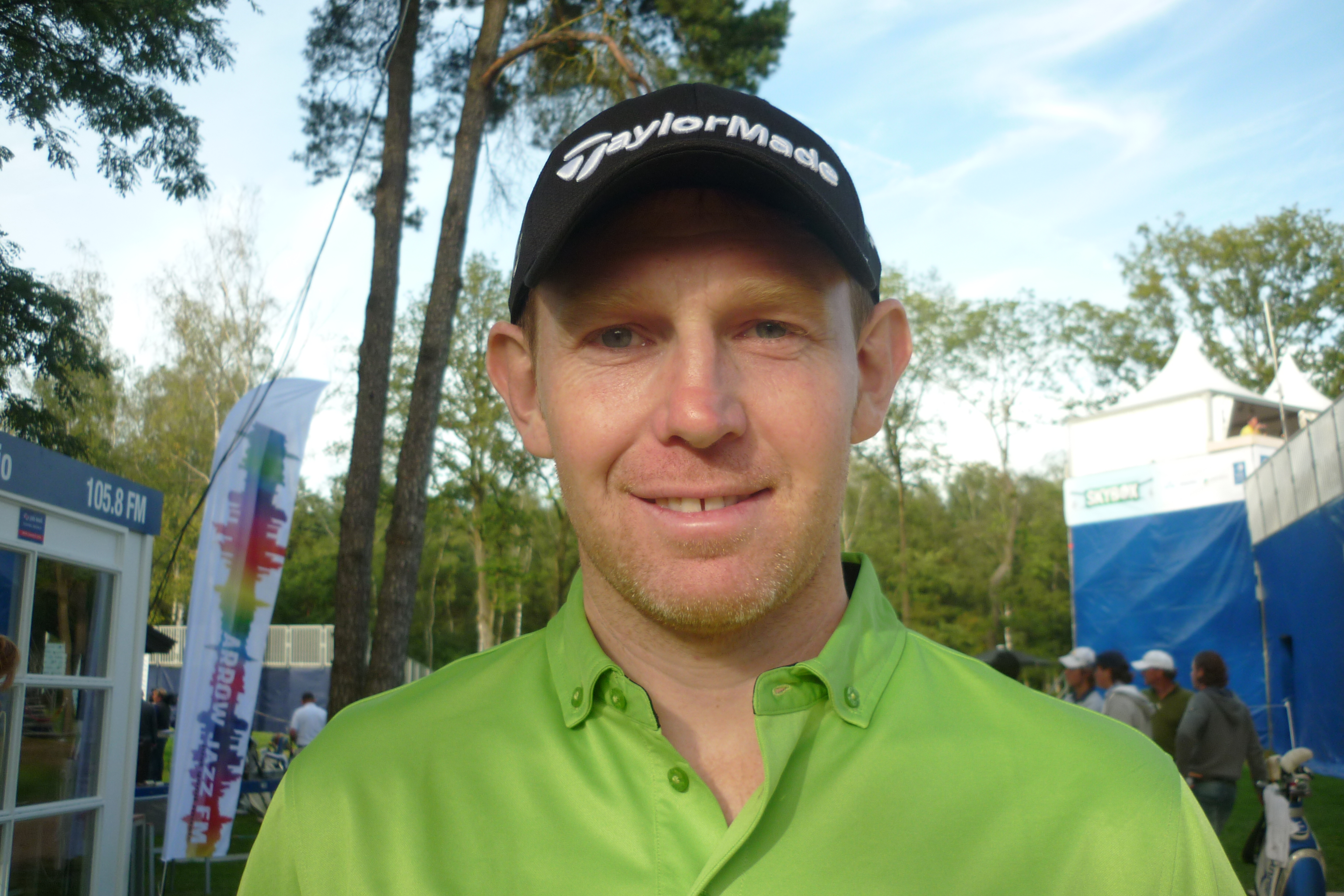

Personal information
- Full name: Stephen James Gallacher
- Nationality: Scotland
- Born: 1 November 1974 (age 52) Dechmont, Scotland
- Height: 6 ft 2 in (1.88 m)
- Weight: 87 kg (192 lb; 13.7 st)
- Spouse: Helen (m. 1999)
- Children: 2

Career
- Sport: Golf
- Turned professional: 1995
- Former tour: European Tour
- Professional wins: 5
- Highest ranking: 31 (20 July 2014)

Number of wins by tour
- European Tour: 4
- Asian Tour: 1
- Challenge Tour: 1

Best results in major championships
- Masters Tournament: T34: 2014
- PGA Championship: T18: 2010
- U.S. Open: CUT: 2005, 2011, 2014, 2015
- The Open Championship: T15: 2014

Stephen James Gallacher MBE (born 1 November 1974) is a Scottish professional golfer who played on the European Tour.

== Early life and amateur career ==
In 1974, Gallacher was born in Dechmont, West Lothian. He is the nephew of former European Ryder Cup captain Bernard Gallacher and cousin of Sky Sports news presenter Kirsty Gallacher.

Gallacher won the 1994 European Amateur and a couple of important amateur tournaments in Britain. He played in a victorious Walker Cup side in 1995 and turned professional later that year.

== Professional career ==
In 1995, Gallacher turned professional. He first played on the European Tour in 1996 but struggled to begin with. In 2000, however, he reached the top hundred on the Order of Merit for the first time, placing 56th. In 2004, he recorded his first win on the tour at the Dunhill Links Championship, which is one of the richest golf tournaments in Europe, and finished the year ranked 15th on the Order of Merit.

In February 2013, Gallacher ended a 201-tournament wait for his second victory on the European Tour, when he won the Omega Dubai Desert Classic by three strokes. He held the lead going into the final round after he shot his best career round of 62 on the European Tour in the third round. Despite two bogeys in his first two holes, Gallacher clinched victory with an eagle on the 16th hole. The win moved Gallacher back into the world's top 100.

The following year, Gallacher defended his title with a one stroke victory at the 2014 Omega Dubai Desert Classic for his third European Tour victory. He is the first golfer to ever successfully defend the title. Five years after his title defense in Dubai, he won again on the European Tour by claiming the 2019 Hero Indian Open, India's premier event, with a birdie on the 18th at the Gary Player course at the DLF Golf and Country Club near Delhi, India, despite a quadruple-bogey on the 7th. His son Jack caddied for him during his win in India.

Gallacher was one of the three captain's picks by Paul McGinley for the 2014 Ryder Cup.

In December 2022 Gallacher was announced by Ryder Cup Europe as captain of the 2023 European Junior Ryder Cup team, for the match against United States in Rome, Italy ahead of the 2023 Ryder Cup match.

== Amateur wins ==
- 1991 Scottish Boys Strokeplay Championship
- 1992 Scottish Boys Strokeplay Championship, Scottish Amateur Championship
- 1994 European Amateur, Scottish Youths Amateur Championship
- 1995 Scottish Amateur Open Stroke Play Championship, Lytham Trophy

== Professional wins (5) ==
=== European Tour wins (4) ===
No.	Date	Tournament	Winning score	Margin of victory	Runner-up
1	10 Oct 2004	Dunhill Links Championship	−19 (70-66-66-67=269)	Playoff	(Northern Ireland) Graeme McDowell
2	3 Feb 2013	Omega Dubai Desert Classic	−22 (63-70-62-71=266)	3 strokes	(South Africa) Richard Sterne
3	2 Feb 2014	Omega Dubai Desert Classic (2)	−16 (66-71-63-72=272)	1 stroke	(Argentina) Emiliano Grillo
4	31 Mar 2019	Hero Indian Open^{1}	−9 (67-74-67-71=279)	1 stroke	(Japan) Masahiro Kawamura

^{1}Co-sanctioned by the Asian Tour

European Tour playoff record (1–2)

No.	Year	Tournament	Opponent(s)	Result
1	2004	Dunhill Links Championship	(Northern Ireland) Graeme McDowell	Won with birdie on first extra hole
2	2013	Johnnie Walker Championship at Gleneagles	(England) Tommy Fleetwood, (Argentina) Ricardo González	Fleetwood won with birdie on first extra hole
3	2014	Nordea Masters	(France) Victor Dubuisson, (Thailand) Thongchai Jaidee	Jaidee won with birdie on first extra hole

=== Challenge Tour wins (1) ===
No.	Date	Tournament	Winning score	Margin of victory	Runner-up
1	7 Jun 1998	KB Golf Challenge	−14 (63-71-69-67=270)	2 strokes	(Germany) Erol Şimşek

Challenge Tour playoff record (0–1)

No.	Year	Tournament	Opponent	Result
1	1998	Audi Quattro Trophy	(Italy) Marcello Santi	Lost to birdie on fourth extra hole

== Results in major championships ==
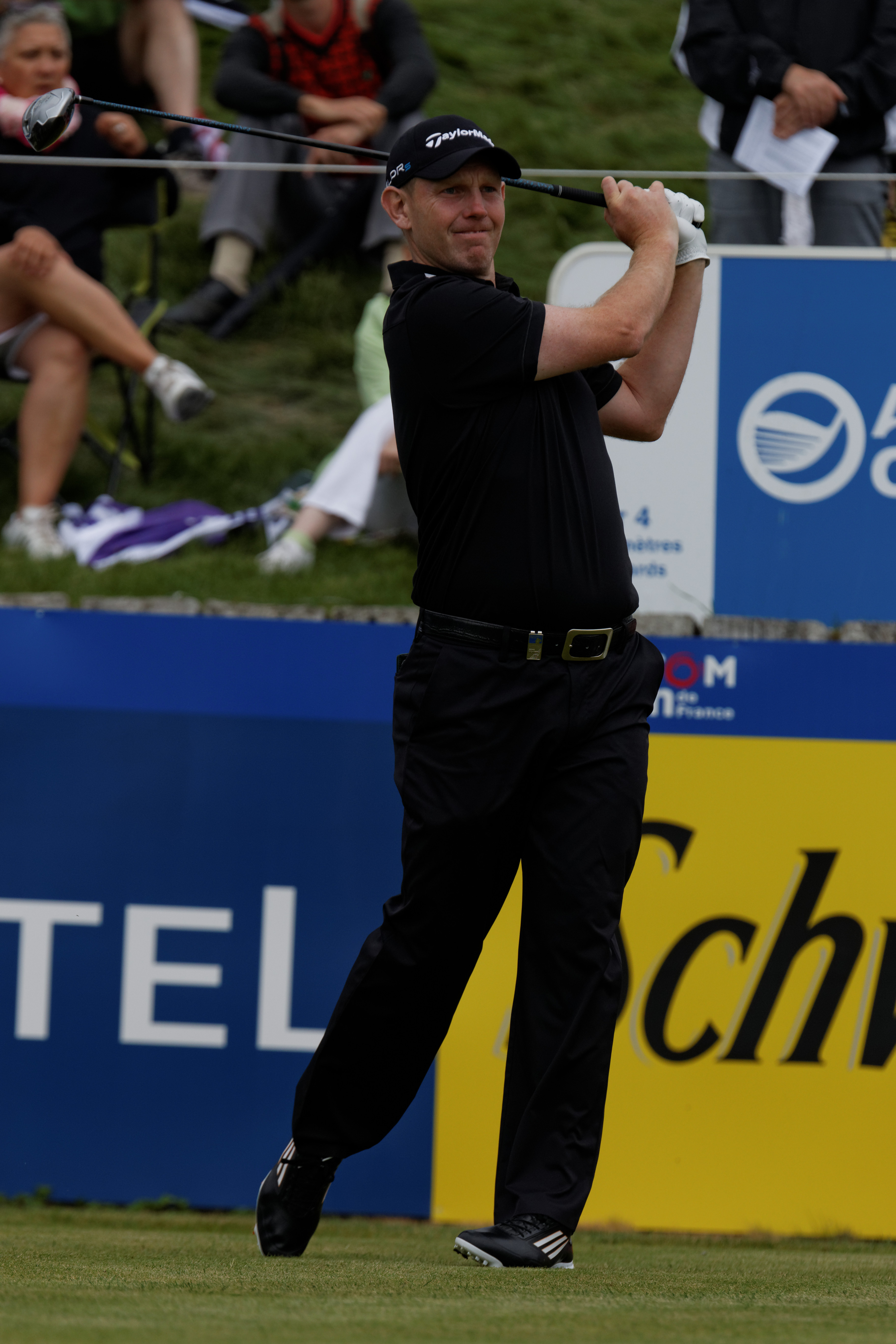
Stephen Gallacher

Tournament	1995	1996	1997	1998	1999
Masters Tournament					
U.S. Open					
The Open Championship	CUT				CUT
PGA Championship					

Tournament	2000	2001	2002	2003	2004	2005	2006	2007	2008	2009
Masters Tournament										
U.S. Open						CUT				
The Open Championship						CUT				
PGA Championship						CUT				

Tournament	2010	2011	2012	2013	2014	2015
Masters Tournament					T34	CUT
U.S. Open		CUT			CUT	CUT
The Open Championship	T23	T57		T21	T15	CUT
PGA Championship	T18	CUT		T61	CUT	CUT

Did not play

CUT = missed the half-way cut
"T" = tied

=== Summary ===
Tournament	Wins	2nd	3rd	Top-5	Top-10	Top-25	Events	Cuts made
Masters Tournament	0	0	0	0	0	0	2	1
U.S. Open	0	0	0	0	0	0	4	0
The Open Championship	0	0	0	0	0	3	8	4
PGA Championship	0	0	0	0	0	1	6	2
Totals	0	0	0	0	0	4	20	7

- Most consecutive cuts made – 3 (2013 Open Championship – 2014 Masters)
- Longest streak of top-10s – 0

== Results in The Players Championship ==
Tournament	2014	2015
The Players Championship	CUT	T38

CUT = missed the halfway cut
"T" indicates a tie for a place

== Results in World Golf Championships ==
Results not in chronological order before 2015.

Tournament	2005	2006	2007	2008	2009	2010	2011	2012	2013	2014	2015
Championship									T53	T6	T66
Match Play									R64	R64	T52
Invitational	T58								T44	T47	56
Champions									T63	T24	

Top 10
Did not play

QF, R16, R32, R64 = Round in which player lost in match play
"T" = Tied
Note that the HSBC Champions did not become a WGC event until 2009.

== Team appearances ==
Amateur

- European Boys' Team Championship (representing Scotland): 1992 (winners)
- Jacques Léglise Trophy (representing Great Britain & Ireland): 1992 (winners)
- European Amateur Team Championship (representing Scotland): 1993 (winners), 1995 (winners)
- Eisenhower Trophy (representing Great Britain & Ireland): 1994
- Walker Cup (representing Great Britain & Ireland): 1995 (winners)

Professional

- World Cup (representing Scotland): 2005, 2011, 2013
- Seve Trophy (representing Great Britain & Ireland): 2013
- Royal Trophy (representing Europe): 2013 (winners)
- EurAsia Cup (representing Europe): 2014
- Ryder Cup (representing Europe): 2014 (winners)

== See also ==
- 2009 European Tour Qualifying School graduates
