= Mikko Ilonen =

Finnish professional golfer

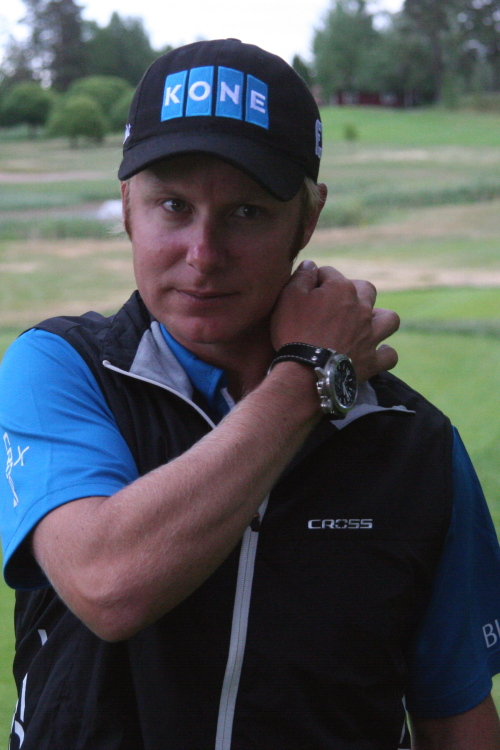

Personal information
- Full name: Mikko Ilonen
- Nationality: Finland
- Born: 18 December 1979 (age 46) Lahti, Finland
- Height: 1.87 m (6 ft 2 in)
- Weight: 83 kg (183 lb; 13.1 st)

Career
- Sport: Golf
- Turned professional: 2001
- Former tour: European Tour
- Professional wins: 5
- Highest ranking: 37 (19 October 2014)

Number of wins by tour
- European Tour: 5
- Asian Tour: 1

Best results in major championships
- Masters Tournament: CUT: 2001, 2015
- PGA Championship: T7: 2014
- U.S. Open: CUT: 2010, 2012
- The Open Championship: T9: 2001

Mikko Ilonen (born 18 December 1979) is a retired Finnish professional golfer who played on the European Tour, winning five times. He is considered to be the most successful golfer from Finland.

== Career ==
Ilonen was born in Lahti, Finland. He won the 2000 Amateur Championship, and turned pro in 2001. He played mainly on the European Tour, where he won five events.

He won his first professional tournament at the 2007 Indonesia Open, an event co-sanctioned by the European Tour and Asian Tour. He was the first Finn to win a European Tour event and to feature in the top 100 of the Official World Golf Ranking.

In June 2013, Ilonen won the Nordea Masters event in Sweden for the second time in his career and third tour level victory overall.

In June 2014, Ilonen won the Irish Open at Fota Island in Cork. Ilonen led the tournament from start to finish and ended up one shot clear of Italian Edoardo Molinari.

Ilonen's best major championship finish was tied 7th at the 2014 PGA Championship. In 2014 he finished the season in a career best 18th on the European Tour Order of Merit.

In March 2019, Ilonen announced his retirement from tour golf.

== Amateur wins ==
- 1999 West of Ireland Amateur
- 2000 The Amateur Championship

== Professional wins (5) ==
=== European Tour wins (5) ===
No.	Date	Tournament	Winning score	Margin of victory	Runner(s)-up
1	18 Feb 2007	Enjoy Jakarta Astro Indonesia Open^{1}	−9 (66-68-71-70=275)	1 stroke	(India) Shiv Kapur, (Philippines) Frankie Miñoza, (Australia) Andrew Tampion
2	19 Aug 2007	Scandinavian Masters	−6 (67-72-67-68=274)	2 strokes	(France) Christian Cévaër, (England) Nick Dougherty, (France) Jean-Baptiste Gonnet, (Sweden) Peter Hedblom, (Germany) Martin Kaymer
3	2 Jun 2013	Nordea Masters (2)	−21 (70-63-65-69=267)	3 strokes	(Sweden) Jonas Blixt
4	22 Jun 2014	Irish Open	−13 (64-68-69-70=271)	1 stroke	(Italy) Edoardo Molinari
5	19 Oct 2014	Volvo World Match Play Championship	3 and 1		(Sweden) Henrik Stenson

^{1}Co-sanctioned by the Asian Tour

European Tour playoff record (0–1)

No.	Year	Tournament	Opponent	Result
1	2014	Commercial Bank Qatar Masters	(Spain) Sergio García	Lost to birdie on third extra hole

== Results in major championships ==
Tournament	2000	2001	2002	2003	2004	2005	2006	2007	2008	2009
Masters Tournament		CUT								
U.S. Open										
The Open Championship	CUT	T9	T50				T16			
PGA Championship										

Tournament	2010	2011	2012	2013	2014	2015
Masters Tournament						CUT
U.S. Open	CUT		CUT			
The Open Championship				T79	CUT	CUT
PGA Championship				CUT	T7	T54

Top 10
Did not play

CUT = missed the half-way cut
"T" = tied

== Results in World Golf Championships ==
Results not in chronological order before 2015.

Tournament	2013	2014	2015
Championship			T23
Match Play		R64	T34
Invitational	T65	T66	T45
Champions	T21	T46	

Did not play

QF, R16, R32, R64 = Round in which player lost in match play
"T" = Tied

== Team appearances ==
Amateur

- European Boys' Team Championship (representing Finland): 1996, 1997
- Jacques Léglise Trophy (representing the Continent of Europe): 1997 (winners)
- European Youths' Team Championship (representing Finland): 1998, 2000
- Eisenhower Trophy (representing Finland): 1998, 2000
- Bonallack Trophy (representing Europe): 2000 (winners)
- St Andrews Trophy (representing the Continent of Europe): 2000

Professional

- Seve Trophy (representing Continental Europe): 2007, 2013 (winners)
- World Cup (representing Finland): 2007, 2018
