= EurAsia Cup =

Former men's golf tournament

Tournament information
- Location: 2018: Shah Alam, Selangor, Malaysia
- Established: 2014
- Courses: 2018: Glenmarie Golf and Country Club
- Tours: Asian Tour; European Tour
- Format: Team match play
- Prize fund: 2018: $4,800,000
- Month played: January

Current champion
- Europe

Final champion
- 2018 EurAsia Cup

Location in Malaysia

The EurAsia Cup was a biennial men's professional team golf tournament between teams representing Europe and Asia. It started in 2014, superseding the Royal Trophy which had been played from 2006 to 2013. It was previously held at the Glenmarie Golf and Country Club, Shah Alam, Selangor, Malaysia, in January of even-numbered years, as a warm-up event for the European Ryder Cup captain.

== Format ==
The EurAsia Cup involves various match play competitions between players selected from two teams of twelve.

The winner of each match scores a point for his team, with a half point each for any match that is tied after the 18 holes. The winning team is determined by cumulative total points. The inaugural EurAsia Cup concluded with both teams tied on 10 points each, which resulted in the EurAsia Cup being shared between the two teams. In the event of a tie in future editions, the EurAsia Cup will be retained by the team who held it before the contest.

Year	Day 1	Day 2	Day 3	Total points
2014	5 fourballs	5 foursomes	10 singles	20
2016–18	6 fourballs	6 foursomes	12 singles	24

== History ==
All three contests were held at the Glenmarie Golf and Country Club in Shah Alam, Selangor, Malaysia. The first contest was played in March 2014. Ten-man teams played a series of 20 matches involving four-ball, foursomes and singles. The result was a 10–10 tie and the Cup was shared. The second contest was played in January 2016. The team size was increased to 12 with a total of 24 matches played. Europe won the match 18½–5½. The third contest was played from 12–14 January 2018. Europe retained the cup with a 14–10 win, although Asia had held a narrow lead at the start of the final day.

The tournament served as a prelude for the Ryder Cup in even-numbered years, but was not played in 2020.

== Results ==
Edition	Year	Winning team	Score	Europe captain	Asia captain
3rd	2018	Europe	14–10	(Denmark) Thomas Bjørn	(India) Arjun Atwal
2nd	2016	Europe	18 1/2–5 1/2	(Northern Ireland) Darren Clarke	(India) Jeev Milkha Singh
1st	2014	Tied	10–10	(Spain) Miguel Ángel Jiménez	(Malaysia) Lee Zi Jia
