= 2020 WGC-Mexico Championship =

Tournament information
- Dates: February 20–23, 2020
- Location: Naucalpan, Mexico; 19.431°N 99.244°W
- Course: Club de Golf Chapultepec
- Tours: PGA Tour; European Tour

Statistics
- Par: 71
- Length: 7,355 yards (6,725 m)
- Field: 72 players
- Cut: None
- Prize fund: $10,500,000
- Winner's share: $1,820,000

Champion
- (United States) Patrick Reed
- 266 (−18)
- Location in Mexico Location in State of Mexico

The 2020 WGC-Mexico Championship was a golf tournament played February 20–23 at Club de Golf Chapultepec in Naucalpan, Mexico, just west of Mexico City. It was the 21st time the WGC Championship is played, and the first of the World Golf Championships events to be staged in 2020. The approximate elevation of the course's clubhouse is 2,400 meters (7,870 ft) above sea level.

Patrick Reed won his second WGC Championship (first in Mexico), by a single stroke ahead of Bryson DeChambeau. DeChambeau was leading heading into the final stages, but scored an aggregate one-over-par on the final 4 holes, whereas Reed birdied the 15th, 16th, and 17th. During the final round five players had a share of the lead, with the other main challengers being Justin Thomas, Rory McIlroy, Jon Rahm, Erik van Rooyen.

This was the final time this event was held in Mexico; the following year's edition was scheduled to return, but due to the COVID-19 pandemic, it was moved to Florida in January 2021 (and played in late February).

== Course layout ==
Club de Golf Chapultepec

Hole	1	2	3	4	5	6	7	8	9	Out	10	11	12	13	14	15	16	17	18	In	Total
Yards	316	387	186	506	445	625	235	525	382	3,607	450	632	406	225	497	575	403	172	388	3,738	7,355
Meters	289	354	170	463	407	572	215	480	349	3,299	411	578	371	206	441	526	369	157	355	3,405	6,726
Par	4	4	3	4	4	5	3	4	4	35	4	5	4	3	4	5	4	3	4	36	71

== Field ==
The field consisted of players from the top of the Official World Golf Ranking and the money lists/Orders of Merit from the six main professional golf tours. Each player is classified according to the first category in which he qualified, but other categories are shown in parentheses.

1. The top 50 players from the Official World Golf Ranking, as of February 10, 2020

An Byeong-hun (2), Abraham Ancer (2,3), Rafa Cabrera-Bello (2), Paul Casey (2,3), Bryson DeChambeau (2,3), Matt Fitzpatrick (2,5,6), Tommy Fleetwood (2,3,5,6), Sergio García (2), Tyrrell Hatton (2,5), Billy Horschel (2), Im Sung-jae (2,3,4), Shugo Imahira (2,7), Jazz Janewattananond (2,10), Dustin Johnson (2,3), Kevin Kisner (2,3), Matt Kuchar (2,3), Marc Leishman (2,3,4), Shane Lowry (2,5), Hideki Matsuyama (2,3,4), Graeme McDowell (2,6), Rory McIlroy (2,3,4,5), Francesco Molinari (2), Kevin Na (2), Louis Oosthuizen (2,3,5,6), Victor Perez (2,5,6), Jon Rahm (2,3,5), Chez Reavie (2,3), Patrick Reed (2,3), Xander Schauffele (2,3), Adam Scott (2,3), Webb Simpson (2,3,4), Cameron Smith (2,4), Brandt Snedeker (2,3), Jordan Spieth, Justin Thomas (2,3,4), Erik van Rooyen (5), Matt Wallace (2,5), Bubba Watson (2), Lee Westwood (2,6), Bernd Wiesberger (2,5), Danny Willett (2,5,6), Gary Woodland (2,3)

- Patrick Cantlay (2,3), Jason Day (2), Tony Finau (2,3), Rickie Fowler (2,3), Brooks Koepka (2), Justin Rose (2,3), Henrik Stenson (2), and Tiger Woods (2) did not play.

2. The top 50 players from the Official World Golf Ranking, as of February 17, 2020

Christiaan Bezuidenhout (5,6), Collin Morikawa

3. The top 30 players from the final 2019 FedExCup Points List

Corey Conners, Lucas Glover, Charles Howell III, Jason Kokrak

4. The top 10 players from the 2020 FedExCup Points List, as of February 17, 2020

Lanto Griffin, Sebastián Muñoz, Brendon Todd

5. The top 20 players from the final 2019 European Tour Race to Dubai

Jorge Campillo, Benjamin Hébert, Marcus Kinhult, Kurt Kitayama, Mike Lorenzo-Vera, Robert MacIntyre, Matthias Schwab

6. The top 10 players from the 2020 European Tour Race to Dubai, as of February 10, 2020

Branden Grace, Lucas Herbert, Pablo Larrazábal

7. The top 2 players, not otherwise exempt, from the final 2019 Japan Golf Tour Order of Merit

Ryo Ishikawa, Shaun Norris

8. The top 2 players, not otherwise exempt, from the final 2019 PGA Tour of Australasia Order of Merit

Ryan Fox, Zach Murray

9. The top 2 players, not otherwise exempt, from the final 2018–19 Sunshine Tour Order of Merit

Justin Harding, Zander Lombard

10. The top 2 players, not otherwise exempt, from the final 2019 Asian Tour Order of Merit

Scott Hend, Lee Tae-hee

11. The highest-ranked player from Mexico, not otherwise eligible, within the top 300 of the Official World Golf Ranking as of February 10, 2020

Carlos Ortiz

12. Alternates to fill field to 72 (if necessary) from the Official World Golf Ranking as of February 17, 2020

1. Scottie Scheffler (51)
2. Kang Sung-hoon (54)

== Round summaries ==
=== First round ===
Thursday, February 20, 2020

For the second year running, world number one Rory McIlroy led the tournament after the first round, after shooting a 6-under-par 65 to take a two-shot lead over Justin Thomas and Bubba Watson. McIlroy had an eagle on the 11th hole (his second hole) and had five birdies in his round. No players completed a bogey-free round, with the field shooting a combined 100-over par and a scoring average of 72.389, the highest of any WCG round at Chapultepec.

Place	Player	Score	To par
1	(Northern Ireland) Rory McIlroy	65	−6
T2	(United States) Justin Thomas	67	−4
T2	(United States) Bubba Watson	67	−4
T4	(Canada) Corey Conners	68	−3
T4	(United States) Bryson DeChambeau	68	−3
T4	(United States) Billy Horschel	68	−3
T4	(South Africa) Louis Oosthuizen	68	−3
T8	(England) Paul Casey	69	−2
T8	(England) Tyrrell Hatton	69	−2
T8	(South Korea) Im Sung-jae	69	−2
T8	(Japan) Hideki Matsuyama	69	−2
T8	(United States) Patrick Reed	69	−2
T8	(England) Lee Westwood	69	−2

=== Second round ===
Friday, February 21, 2020

The average score was more than 2 strokes lower on day two, than on day one. An 8-under 63 gave Bryson DeChambeau solo lead after making 31 of 32 putts inside 15 feet through two rounds, which also meant he had a career high of total putting distance of 265' 10". On his 30th birthday, Erik van Rooyen was the only player to shoot a bogey-free round, and matched Justin Thomas' course record with a 9-under 62. Rory McIlroy struggled compared to his first round, but three late birdies meant he stayed within 3 strokes of the lead going into day three.

Place	Player	Score	To par
1	(United States) Bryson DeChambeau	68-63=131	−11
T2	(United States) Patrick Reed	69-63=132	−10
T2	(South Africa) Erik van Rooyen	70-62=132	−10
T4	(Japan) Hideki Matsuyama	69-64=133	−9
T4	(United States) Justin Thomas	67-66=133	−9
6	(Northern Ireland) Rory McIlroy	65-69=134	−8
T7	(England) Paul Casey	69-68=137	−5
T7	(England) Tyrrell Hatton	69-68=137	−5
T7	(Colombia) Sebastián Muñoz	71-66=137	−5
10	(Canada) Corey Conners	68-70=138	−4

=== Third round ===
Saturday, February 22, 2020

Having already won twice in the current PGA Tour season, Justin Thomas shot a 6-under 65 to lead by one stroke after 54-holes, a feat he also achieved at the 2017 WGC-Mexico Championship. Overnight leader Bryson DeChambeau could only hit a level par 71, despite being 3-under after the first two holes, and finished 4 strokes behind Thomas. Jon Rahm set a new tournament and course record after scoring a 10-under 61 which included nine birdies and a hole-in-one on the 17th to finish the day level with DeChambeau.

Place	Player	Score	To par
1	(United States) Justin Thomas	67-66-65=198	−15
T2	(United States) Patrick Reed	69-63-67=199	−14
T2	(South Africa) Erik van Rooyen	70-62-67=199	−14
T4	(United States) Bryson DeChambeau	68-63-71=202	−11
T4	(Northern Ireland) Rory McIlroy	65-69-68=202	−11
T4	(Spain) Jon Rahm	72-69-61=202	−11
T7	(England) Paul Casey	69-68-66=203	−10
T7	(England) Tyrrell Hatton	69-68-66=203	−10
T9	(Japan) Hideki Matsuyama	69-64-71=204	−9
T9	(United States) Kevin Na	71-68-65=204	−9
T9	(United States) Gary Woodland	70-69-65=204	−9

=== Final round ===
Sunday, February 23, 2020

==== Final leaderboard ====
Champion
(c) = past champion

Place	Player	Score	To par	Money ($)
1	(United States) Patrick Reed (c)	69-63-67-67=266	−18	1,820,000
2	(United States) Bryson DeChambeau	68-63-71-65=267	−17	1,150,000
T3	(Spain) Jon Rahm	72-69-61-67=269	−15	600,000
T3	(South Africa) Erik van Rooyen	70-62-67-70=269	−15	600,000
5	(Northern Ireland) Rory McIlroy	65-69-68-68=270	−14	430,000
T6	(England) Tyrrell Hatton	69-68-66-68=271	−13	320,667
T6	(Japan) Hideki Matsuyama	69-64-71-67=271	−13	320,667
T6	(United States) Justin Thomas	67-66-65-73=271	−13	320,667
T9	(United States) Billy Horschel	68-71-68-65=272	−12	237,500
T9	(United States) Kevin Na	71-68-65-68=272	−12	237,500

Leaderboard below the top 10
Place	Player	Score	To par	Money ($)
11	(England) Paul Casey	69-68-66-70=273	−11	205,000
T12	(Mexico) Abraham Ancer	70-70-67-68=275	−9	182,000
T12	(United States) Gary Woodland	70-69-65-71=275	−9	182,000
T14	(Colombia) Sebastián Muñoz	71-66-72-67=276	−8	160,000
T14	(United States) Xander Schauffele	72-72-66-66=276	−8	160,000
T16	(Spain) Rafa Cabrera-Bello	71-71-67-68=277	−7	143,500
T16	(Mexico) Carlos Ortiz	75-68-66-68=277	−7	143,500
T18	(England) Tommy Fleetwood	70-69-70-69=278	−6	125,500
T18	(France) Benjamin Hébert	73-70-65-70=278	−6	125,500
T18	(United States) Kevin Kisner	73-69-67-69=278	−6	125,500
T18	(United States) Bubba Watson	67-72-71-68=278	−6	125,500
T22	(United States) Matt Kuchar	75-67-67-70=279	−5	105,500
T22	(Australia) Cameron Smith	73-73-69-64=279	−5	105,500
T22	(United States) Brandt Snedeker	76-69-70-64=279	−5	105,500
T22	(England) Lee Westwood	69-70-70-70=279	−5	105,500
T26	(South Africa) Zander Lombard	73-68-69-70=280	−4	90,000
T26	(United States) Scottie Scheffler	73-70-67-70=280	−4	90,000
T26	(Australia) Adam Scott (c)	74-68-68-70=280	−4	90,000
T29	(South Korea) An Byeong-hun	75-69-72-65=281	−3	73,500
T29	(South Africa) Christiaan Bezuidenhout	72-72-70-67=281	−3	73,500
T29	(New Zealand) Ryan Fox	72-68-73-68=281	−3	73,500
T29	(United States) Lanto Griffin	72-69-70-70=281	−3	73,500
T29	(South Africa) Justin Harding	71-71-67-72=281	−3	73,500
T29	(South Korea) Im Sung-jae	69-72-70-70=281	−3	73,500
T29	(Republic of Ireland) Shane Lowry	72-69-71-69=281	−3	73,500
T29	(United States) Chez Reavie	71-73-67-70=281	−3	73,500
T37	(England) Matt Fitzpatrick	72-70-70-70=282	−2	56,200
T37	(Spain) Sergio García	74-72-70-66=282	−2	56,200
T37	(South Africa) Shaun Norris	75-68-70-69=282	−2	56,200
T37	(United States) Brendon Todd	72-71-71-68=282	−2	56,200
T37	(Austria) Bernd Wiesberger	70-76-68-68=282	−2	56,200
T42	(South Africa) Branden Grace	71-71-71-70=283	−1	49,500
T42	(Australia) Marc Leishman	74-70-68-71=283	−1	49,500
T42	(Scotland) Robert MacIntyre	76-68-70-69=283	−1	49,500
T42	(United States) Collin Morikawa	72-70-72-69=283	−1	49,500
T42	(Austria) Matthias Schwab	71-68-74-70=283	−1	49,500
T42	(England) Danny Willett	73-68-70-72=283	−1	49,500
T48	(United States) Dustin Johnson (c)	76-71-67-70=284	E	45,500
T48	(Australia) Zach Murray	71-69-69-75=284	E	45,500
50	(Canada) Corey Conners	68-70-72-75=285	+1	44,000
T51	(United States) Jason Kokrak	73-70-73-70=286	+2	42,500
T51	(South Africa) Louis Oosthuizen	68-71-76-71=286	+2	42,500
T53	(United States) Charles Howell III	75-74-68-70=287	+3	39,100
T53	(Thailand) Jazz Janewattananond	73-73-73-68=287	+3	39,100
T53	(United States) Kurt Kitayama	76-70-72-69=287	+3	39,100
T53	(Italy) Francesco Molinari	72-74-71-70=287	+3	39,100
T53	(France) Victor Perez	81-70-66-70=287	+3	39,100
T58	(Australia) Lucas Herbert	75-70-74-69=288	+4	36,500
T58	(United States) Jordan Spieth	74-73-70-71=288	+4	36,500
T58	(England) Matt Wallace	74-77-71-66=288	+4	36,500
T61	(United States) Lucas Glover	71-73-76-69=289	+5	35,000
T61	(Japan) Shugo Imahira	74-70-70-75=289	+5	35,000
T61	(United States) Webb Simpson	72-73-74-70=289	+5	35,000
64	(Spain) Pablo Larrazábal	71-74-70-75=290	+6	34,000
65	(Australia) Scott Hend	72-75-75-70=292	+8	33,750
66	(France) Mike Lorenzo-Vera	76-73-72-73=294	+10	33,500
67	(Spain) Jorge Campillo	77-74-69-75=295	+11	33,250
68	(Japan) Ryo Ishikawa	80-72-73-71=296	+12	33,000
T69	(Sweden) Marcus Kinhult	75-74-75-73=297	+13	32,625
T69	(Northern Ireland) Graeme McDowell	76-74-75-72=297	+13	32,625
71	(South Korea) Kang Sung-hoon	76-76-72-75=299	+15	32,250
72	(South Korea) Lee Tae-hee	80-73-74-76=303	+19	32,000

==== Scorecard ====
Final round

Hole	1	2	3	4	5	6	7	8	9	10	11	12	13	14	15	16	17	18
Par	4	4	3	4	4	5	3	4	4	4	5	4	3	4	5	4	3	4
(United States) Reed	−15	−15	−15	−15	−15	−15	−15	−15	−15	−15	−15	−16	−16	−16	−17	−18	−19	−18
(United States) DeChambeau	−11	−11	−12	−12	−12	−13	−14	−13	−14	−15	−16	−17	−17	−18	−18	−18	−17	−17
(Spain) Rahm	−12	−13	−14	−14	−15	−15	−15	−15	−15	−15	−14	−14	−15	−14	−15	−15	−15	−15
(South Africa) van Rooyen	−15	−16	−15	−15	−15	−15	−15	−15	−15	−13	−14	−13	−13	−13	−14	−15	−15	−15
(Northern Ireland) McIlroy	−12	−12	−12	−13	−13	−14	−14	−14	−14	−14	−14	−13	−13	−13	−13	−14	−14	−14
(England) Hatton	−11	−11	−11	−11	−11	−11	−10	−11	−12	−12	−12	−12	−12	−13	−14	−14	−13	−13
(Japan) Matsuyama	−9	−9	−8	−9	−9	−9	−9	−9	−9	−9	−10	−11	−11	−12	−11	−12	−13	−13
(United States) Thomas	−16	−16	−15	−15	−16	−16	−15	−14	−14	−12	−13	−13	−12	−12	−12	−13	−13	−13

Cumulative tournament scores, relative to par

Birdie	Bogey	Double bogey
