= 2018 WGC-Mexico Championship =

Tournament information
- Dates: March 1–4, 2018
- Location: Naucalpan, Mexico; 19.431°N 99.244°W
- Course: Club de Golf Chapultepec
- Tours: PGA Tour; European Tour

Statistics
- Par: 71
- Length: 7,345 yards (6,716 m)
- Field: 64 players
- Cut: None
- Prize fund: $10,000,000 €8,190,676
- Winner's share: $1,700,000 €1,392,415

Champion
- (United States) Phil Mickelson
- 268 (−16), playoff

Location map
- Location in Mexico Location in State of Mexico

The 2018 WGC-Mexico Championship was a golf tournament played March 1–4 at Club de Golf Chapultepec in Naucalpan, Mexico, just west of Mexico City. It was the 19th time the WGC Championship was played, and the first of the World Golf Championships events to be staged in 2018. The approximate elevation of the course's clubhouse is 2,400 meters (7,870 ft) above sea level.

Phil Mickelson won the tournament on the first playoff hole; it was his first tour victory in over 4½ years, since The Open Championship in 2013.

== Course layout ==
Club de Golf Chapultepec

Hole	1	2	3	4	5	6	7	8	9	Out	10	11	12	13	14	15	16	17	18	In	Total
Yards	316	387	186	506	445	625	235	525	382	3,607	450	622	406	225	497	575	403	172	388	3,738	7,345
Meters	289	354	170	463	407	572	215	480	349	3,299	411	569	371	206	441	526	369	157	355	3,405	6,704
Par	4	4	3	4	4	5	3	4	4	35	4	5	4	3	4	5	4	3	4	36	71

== Field ==
The field consisted of players from the top of the Official World Golf Ranking and the money lists/Orders of Merit from the six main professional golf tours. Each player is classified according to the first category in which he qualified, but other categories are shown in parentheses.

1. The top 50 players from the Official World Golf Ranking, as of February 19, 2018

Kiradech Aphibarnrat (2,5), Daniel Berger (2,3), Rafa Cabrera-Bello (2,5), Patrick Cantlay (2,3), Paul Casey (2,3), Kevin Chappell (2,3), Jason Dufner (2,3), Tony Finau (2,3,4), Ross Fisher (2,5,6), Matt Fitzpatrick (2,5), Tommy Fleetwood (2,5,6), Rickie Fowler (2,3), Dylan Frittelli (2,5,6), Sergio García (2,3,5), Branden Grace (2,5), Adam Hadwin (2,3), Brian Harman (2,3), Tyrrell Hatton (2,5), Charley Hoffman (2,3), Yuta Ikeda (2), Dustin Johnson (2,3,4), Kevin Kisner (2,3), Satoshi Kodaira (2,7), Matt Kuchar (2,3), Li Haotong (2,5,6), Marc Leishman (2,3), Phil Mickelson (2), Francesco Molinari (2,5), Alex Norén (2,5), Louis Oosthuizen (2), Pat Perez (2,3,4), Thomas Pieters (2,5), Jon Rahm (2,3,4,5), Chez Reavie (2,4), Patrick Reed (2,3), Justin Rose (2,3,5), Xander Schauffele (2,3), Charl Schwartzel (2), Webb Simpson (2,3), Jordan Spieth (2,3), Brendan Steele (2,4), Justin Thomas (2,3,4), Jhonattan Vegas (2,3), Bubba Watson (2), Gary Woodland (2,3,4)

- Brooks Koepka (2,3) did not play due to injury.
- Jason Day (2,3,4), Hideki Matsuyama (2,3), Rory McIlroy (2,5,6), and Henrik Stenson (2,5) did not play.

2. The top 50 players from the Official World Golf Ranking, as of February 26, 2018

3. The top 30 players from the final 2017 FedExCup Points List

Russell Henley, Kyle Stanley

4. The top 10 players from the 2018 FedExCup Points List, as of February 26, 2018

Patton Kizzire

5. The top 20 players from the final 2017 European Tour Race to Dubai

Paul Dunne, Peter Uihlein, Bernd Wiesberger

6. The top 10 players from the 2018 European Tour Race to Dubai, as of February 19, 2018

Jorge Campillo, Joost Luiten, Wade Ormsby, Chris Paisley, Shubhankar Sharma

7. The top 2 players not exempt from the final 2017 Japan Golf Tour Order of Merit

Yūsaku Miyazato

- Chan Kim did not play due to a wrist injury.

8. The top 2 players from the final 2017 PGA Tour of Australasia Order of Merit

Adam Bland, Brett Rumford

9. The top 2 players from the final 2017 Sunshine Tour Order of Merit

Dean Burmester, Brandon Stone

10. The top 2 players from the final 2017 Asian Tour Order of Merit

Gavin Green, David Lipsky

11. The highest ranked available player from Mexico from the Official World Golf Ranking as of February 19, 2018

Abraham Ancer

== Round summaries ==
=== First round ===
Thursday, March 1, 2018

Place	Player	Score	To par
1	(South Africa) Louis Oosthuizen	64	−7
T2	(England) Chris Paisley	65	−6
T2	(United States) Xander Schauffele	65	−6
T2	(India) Shubhankar Sharma	65	−6
T5	(Thailand) Kiradech Aphibarnrat	66	−5
T5	(Spain) Rafa Cabrera-Bello	66	−5
7	(Spain) Jon Rahm	67	−4
T8	(United States) Tony Finau	68	−3
T8	(United States) Rickie Fowler	68	−3
T8	(Spain) Sergio García	68	−3
T8	(United States) Brian Harman	68	−3
T8	(United States) Pat Perez	68	−3

=== Second round ===
Friday, March 2, 2018

Place	Player	Score	To par
1	(India) Shubhankar Sharma	65-66=131	−11
T2	(Spain) Rafa Cabrera-Bello	66-67=133	−9
T2	(Spain) Sergio García	68-65=133	−9
T2	(United States) Xander Schauffele	65-68=133	−9
T5	(Thailand) Kiradech Aphibarnrat	66-69=135	−7
T5	(United States) Brian Harman	68-67=135	−7
T5	(United States) Dustin Johnson	69-66=135	−7
T5	(South Africa) Louis Oosthuizen	64-71=135	−7
T5	(United States) Pat Perez	68-67=135	−7
T5	(United States) Brendan Steele	69-66=135	−7
T5	(United States) Bubba Watson	69-66=135	−7

=== Third round ===
Saturday, March 3, 2018

Place	Player	Score	To par
1	(India) Shubhankar Sharma	65-66-69=200	−13
T2	(Spain) Rafa Cabrera-Bello	66-67-69=202	−11
T2	(Spain) Sergio García	68-65-69=202	−11
T2	(England) Tyrrell Hatton	70-68-64=202	−11
T2	(United States) Phil Mickelson	69-68-65=202	−11
T6	(United States) Brian Harman	68-67-68=203	−10
T6	(United States) Dustin Johnson	69-66-68=203	−10
T6	(United States) Pat Perez	68-67-68=203	−10
T6	(United States) Xander Schauffele	65-68-70=203	−10
10	(United States) Justin Thomas	72-70-62=204	−9

=== Final round ===
Sunday, March 4, 2018

Place	Player	Score	To par	Money (US$)
T1	(United States) Phil Mickelson	69-68-65-66=268	−16	Playoff
T1	(United States) Justin Thomas	72-70-62-64=268	−16	Playoff
T3	(Spain) Rafa Cabrera-Bello	66-67-69-67=269	−15	510,500
T3	(England) Tyrrell Hatton	70-68-64-67=269	−15	510,500
T5	(Thailand) Kiradech Aphibarnrat	66-69-71-65=271	−13	330,500
T5	(United States) Brian Harman	68-67-68-68=271	−13	330,500
T7	(Spain) Sergio García	68-65-69-70=272	−12	239,750
T7	(United States) Dustin Johnson	69-66-68-69=272	−12	239,750
T9	(Canada) Adam Hadwin	70-71-67-66=274	−10	182,000
T9	(India) Shubhankar Sharma	65-66-69-74=274	−10	182,000
T9	(United States) Bubba Watson	69-66-72-67=274	−10	182,000

==== Scorecard ====
Final round

Hole	1	2	3	4	5	6	7	8	9	10	11	12	13	14	15	16	17	18
Par	4	4	3	4	4	5	3	4	4	4	5	4	3	4	5	4	3	4
(United States) Mickelson	−12	−13	−12	−13	−13	−14	−14	−14	−14	−15	−14	−14	−14	−14	−15	−16	−16	−16
(United States) Thomas	−10	−11	−11	−11	−11	−12	−12	−12	−12	−13	−13	−14	−14	−14	−15	−15	−14	−16
(Spain) Cabrera-Bello	−13	−13	−13	−13	−12	−12	−13	−13	−13	−13	−13	−12	−13	−13	−14	−14	−14	−15
(England) Hatton	−12	−13	−13	−14	−14	−13	−13	−13	−13	−13	−12	−13	−13	−14	−16	−16	−16	−15
(Thailand) Aphibarnrat	−7	−8	−8	−8	−9	−10	−10	−10	−10	−11	−12	−12	−12	−13	−13	−12	−12	−13
(United States) Harman	−11	−11	−11	−10	−10	−10	−10	−10	−11	−11	−12	−13	−13	−14	−14	−13	−13	−13
(India) Sharma	−13	−13	−13	−13	−12	−12	−12	−12	−12	−12	−12	−13	−12	−11	−11	−12	−11	−10

Cumulative tournament scores, relative to par

Eagle	Birdie	Bogey	Double bogey

==== Playoff ====
The playoff started on the par-3 17th hole. From the tee, Thomas went past the green and Mickelson found the putting surface. Thomas left his difficult chip well short, Mickelson just missed his birdie putt and tapped in for par; Thomas missed the par putt he needed to extend the playoff.

Place	Player	Score	To par	Money (US$)
1	(United States) Phil Mickelson	3	E	1,700,000
2	(United States) Justin Thomas	–	–	1,072,000
