= 2019 WGC-Mexico Championship =

- PGA Tour advertisement for the 2019 WGC-Mexico Championship featuring winner Dustin Johnson

Tournament information
- Dates: February 21–24, 2019
- Location: Naucalpan, Mexico; 19.431°N 99.244°W
- Course: Club de Golf Chapultepec
- Tours: PGA Tour; European Tour

Statistics
- Par: 71
- Length: 7,345 yards (6,716 m)
- Field: 72 players
- Cut: None
- Prize fund: $10,250,000
- Winner's share: $1,745,000

Champion
- (United States) Dustin Johnson
- 263 (−21)

Location map
- Location in Mexico Location in State of Mexico

The 2019 WGC-Mexico Championship was a golf tournament played February 21–24 at Club de Golf Chapultepec in Naucalpan, Mexico, just west of Mexico City. It was the 20th time the WGC Championship was played, and the first of the World Golf Championships events to be staged in 2019. The approximate elevation of the course's clubhouse is 2,400 meters (7,870 ft) above sea level.

Dustin Johnson eased to a 5 stroke victory ahead of Rory McIlroy to win his third WGC Championship (second in Mexico), and sixth World Golf Championship overall. Although the victory did not immediately return Johnson to world number one, he and the current number one (Justin Rose) were not competing in the following week, which meant he was guaranteed to return to top spot a week later.

== Course layout ==
Club de Golf Chapultepec

| Hole | 1 | 2 | 3 | 4 | 5 | 6 | 7 | 8 | 9 | Out | 10 | 11 | 12 | 13 | 14 | 15 | 16 | 17 | 18 | In | Total |
|---|---|---|---|---|---|---|---|---|---|---|---|---|---|---|---|---|---|---|---|---|---|
| Yards | 316 | 387 | 186 | 506 | 445 | 625 | 235 | 525 | 382 | 3,607 | 450 | 622 | 406 | 225 | 497 | 575 | 403 | 172 | 388 | 3,738 | 7,345 |
| Meters | 289 | 354 | 170 | 463 | 407 | 572 | 215 | 480 | 349 | 3,299 | 411 | 569 | 371 | 206 | 441 | 526 | 369 | 157 | 355 | 3,405 | 6,704 |
| Par | 4 | 4 | 3 | 4 | 4 | 5 | 3 | 4 | 4 | 35 | 4 | 5 | 4 | 3 | 4 | 5 | 4 | 3 | 4 | 36 | 71 |

== Field ==
The field consisted of players from the top of the Official World Golf Ranking and the money lists/Orders of Merit from the six main professional golf tours. Each player is classified according to the first category in which he qualified, but other categories are shown in parentheses.

1. The top 50 players from the Official World Golf Ranking, as of February 11, 2019

Kiradech Aphibarnrat (2,5), Lucas Bjerregaard (5), Keegan Bradley (2,3), Rafa Cabrera-Bello (2), Patrick Cantlay (2,3), Paul Casey (2,3), Bryson DeChambeau (2,3,4,6), Tony Finau (2,3), Matt Fitzpatrick (2), Tommy Fleetwood (2,3,5), Rickie Fowler (2,3), Sergio García (2,5), Branden Grace (2), Emiliano Grillo, Tyrrell Hatton (2,5), Billy Horschel (2,3), Dustin Johnson (2,3), Kevin Kisner (2), Brooks Koepka (2,3), Matt Kuchar (2,4), Marc Leishman (2,3,4), Li Haotong (2,5,6), Shane Lowry (2,6), Hideki Matsuyama (2,3), Rory McIlroy (2,3,5), Phil Mickelson (2,3,4), Francesco Molinari (2,3,5), Alex Norén (2,5), Thorbjørn Olesen (2,5), Louis Oosthuizen (2,6), Eddie Pepperell (2,5), Ian Poulter (2,6), Jon Rahm (2,3,5), Chez Reavie (2), Patrick Reed (2,3,5), Xander Schauffele (2,3,4,5), Webb Simpson (2,3), Cameron Smith (2,3), Jordan Spieth (2), Kyle Stanley (2,3), Henrik Stenson (2), Justin Thomas (2,3,4), Matt Wallace (2,5,6), Bubba Watson (2,3), Gary Woodland (2,3,4), Tiger Woods (2,3)

- Jason Day (2,3), Andrew Putnam (2), Justin Rose (2,3,4,5), and Adam Scott (2) did not play.

2. The top 50 players from the Official World Golf Ranking, as of February 18, 2019

Charles Howell III (4)

- J. B. Holmes (4) did not play.

3. The top 30 players from the final 2018 FedExCup Points List

Patton Kizzire, Kevin Na, Aaron Wise

4. The top 10 players from the 2019 FedExCup Points List, as of February 18, 2019

5. The top 20 players from the final 2018 European Tour Race to Dubai

Alexander Björk, Russell Knox, Lee Westwood, Danny Willett

6. The top 10 players from the 2019 European Tour Race to Dubai, as of February 11, 2019

David Lipsky, Joost Luiten, Aaron Rai, Richard Sterne

7. The top 2 players not exempt from the final 2018 Japan Golf Tour Order of Merit

Shugo Imahira, Shaun Norris

8. The top 2 players from the final 2018 PGA Tour of Australasia Order of Merit

Jake McLeod, Matthew Millar

9. The leading two available players from the final 2017–18 Sunshine Tour Order of Merit

George Coetzee, Erik van Rooyen

10. The top 2 players from the final 2018 Asian Tour Order of Merit

Park Sang-hyun, Shubhankar Sharma

11. The highest-ranked available player from Mexico from the Official World Golf Ranking as of February 11, 2019

Abraham Ancer

12. Alternates to fill field to 72 (if necessary) from the Official World Golf Ranking as of February 18, 2019

- An Byeong-hun (56)
- Tom Lewis (57)
- Satoshi Kodaira (58)
- Adrián Otaegui (64)
- Ryan Fox (66)
- Kim Si-woo (52), Brandt Snedeker (54) and Adam Hadwin (62) did not play.

== Round summaries ==
=== First round ===
Thursday, February 21, 2019

Rory McIlroy shot an 8-under-par 63 to take a one-shot lead over Dustin Johnson.

| Place | Player | Score | To par |
|---|---|---|---|
| 1 | (Northern Ireland) Rory McIlroy | 63 | −8 |
| 2 | (United States) Dustin Johnson | 64 | −7 |
| T3 | (United States) Matt Kuchar | 66 | −5 |
| T3 | (United States) Justin Thomas | 66 | −5 |
| T5 | (South Africa) George Coetzee | 67 | −4 |
| T5 | (England) Tyrrell Hatton | 67 | −4 |
| T7 | (Thailand) Kiradech Aphibarnrat | 68 | −3 |
| T7 | (United States) Billy Horschel | 68 | −3 |
| T7 | (United States) David Lipsky | 68 | −3 |
| T7 | (England) Ian Poulter | 68 | −3 |

=== Second round ===
Friday, February 22, 2019

| Place | Player | Score | To par |
|---|---|---|---|
| 1 | (United States) Dustin Johnson | 64-67=131 | −11 |
| T2 | (United States) Matt Kuchar | 66-67=133 | −9 |
| T2 | (Northern Ireland) Rory McIlroy | 63-70=133 | −9 |
| T4 | (England) Tommy Fleetwood | 70-65=135 | −7 |
| T4 | (Spain) Sergio García | 69-66=135 | −7 |
| T6 | (England) Ian Poulter | 68-68=136 | −6 |
| T6 | (Australia) Cameron Smith | 69-67=136 | −6 |
| T8 | (Thailand) Kiradech Aphibarnrat | 68-69=137 | −5 |
| T8 | (England) Tyrrell Hatton | 67-70=137 | −5 |
| T8 | (United States) Charles Howell III | 69-68=137 | −5 |
| T8 | (South Africa) Richard Sterne | 69-68=137 | −5 |
| T8 | (United States) Tiger Woods | 71-66=137 | −5 |

=== Third round ===
Saturday, February 23, 2019

| Place | Player | Score | To par |
|---|---|---|---|
| 1 | (United States) Dustin Johnson | 64-67-66=197 | −16 |
| 2 | (Northern Ireland) Rory McIlroy | 63-70-68=201 | −12 |
| T3 | (United States) Patrick Cantlay | 72-67-65=204 | −9 |
| T3 | (Spain) Sergio García | 69-66-69=204 | −9 |
| T3 | (United States) Patrick Reed | 72-68-64=204 | −9 |
| T3 | (Australia) Cameron Smith | 69-67-68=204 | −9 |
| T7 | (Thailand) Kiradech Aphibarnrat | 68-69-68=205 | −8 |
| T7 | (England) Ian Poulter | 68-68-69=205 | −8 |
| T9 | (England) Tommy Fleetwood | 70-65-72=207 | −6 |
| T9 | (United States) David Lipsky | 68-71-68=207 | −6 |
| T9 | (South Africa) Louis Oosthuizen | 72-66-69=207 | −6 |
| T9 | (United States) Tiger Woods | 71-66-70=207 | −6 |

=== Final round ===
Sunday, February 24, 2019

| Place | Player | Score | To par | Money (US$) |
|---|---|---|---|---|
| 1 | (United States) Dustin Johnson | 64-67-66-66=263 | −21 | 1,745,000 |
| 2 | (Northern Ireland) Rory McIlroy | 63-70-68-67=268 | −16 | 1,095,000 |
| T3 | (Thailand) Kiradech Aphibarnrat | 68-69-68-68=273 | −11 | 472,000 |
| T3 | (England) Paul Casey | 71-72-65-65=273 | −11 | 472,000 |
| T3 | (England) Ian Poulter | 68-68-69-68=273 | −11 | 472,000 |
| T6 | (United States) Patrick Cantlay | 72-67-65-70=274 | −10 | 261,667 |
| T6 | (Spain) Sergio García | 69-66-69-70=274 | −10 | 261,667 |
| T6 | (Australia) Cameron Smith | 69-67-68-70=274 | −10 | 261,667 |
| 9 | (United States) Justin Thomas | 66-73-74-62=275 | −9 | 201,000 |
| T10 | (United States) Keegan Bradley | 69-73-69-65=276 | −8 | 161,500 |
| T10 | (United States) David Lipsky | 68-71-68-69=276 | −8 | 161,500 |
| T10 | (Netherlands) Joost Luiten | 71-67-74-64=276 | −8 | 161,500 |
| T10 | (United States) Tiger Woods | 71-66-70-69=276 | −8 | 161,500 |

==== Scorecard ====
Final round

| Hole | 1 | 2 | 3 | 4 | 5 | 6 | 7 | 8 | 9 | 10 | 11 | 12 | 13 | 14 | 15 | 16 | 17 | 18 |
|---|---|---|---|---|---|---|---|---|---|---|---|---|---|---|---|---|---|---|
| Par | 4 | 4 | 3 | 4 | 4 | 5 | 3 | 4 | 4 | 4 | 5 | 4 | 3 | 4 | 5 | 4 | 3 | 4 |
| (United States) Johnson | −16 | −16 | −15 | −15 | −15 | −16 | −16 | −16 | −16 | −17 | −18 | −18 | −18 | −19 | −20 | −21 | −21 | −21 |
| (Northern Ireland) McIlroy | −12 | −13 | −13 | −12 | −12 | −11 | −11 | −11 | −11 | −11 | −12 | −13 | −13 | −14 | −15 | −16 | −17 | −16 |
| (Thailand) Aphibarnrat | −8 | −8 | −7 | −7 | −8 | −8 | −8 | −8 | −8 | −8 | −8 | −8 | −8 | −8 | −8 | −9 | −10 | −11 |
| (England) Casey | −6 | −7 | −8 | −8 | −8 | −9 | −9 | −9 | −9 | −10 | −11 | −11 | −10 | −10 | −10 | −11 | −11 | −11 |
| (England) Poulter | −7 | −8 | −7 | −7 | −7 | −7 | −7 | −7 | −7 | −8 | −9 | −9 | −9 | −9 | −10 | −11 | −11 | −11 |
| (United States) Cantlay | −10 | −10 | −10 | −10 | −10 | −10 | −10 | −10 | −10 | −10 | −11 | −11 | −10 | −10 | −10 | −10 | −10 | −10 |
| (Spain) García | −8 | −8 | −8 | −8 | −8 | −8 | −8 | −8 | −9 | −10 | −10 | −11 | −10 | −9 | −10 | −10 | −10 | −10 |
| (Australia) Smith | −8 | −9 | −9 | −8 | −8 | −8 | −8 | −8 | −7 | −8 | −8 | −8 | −8 | −9 | −9 | −9 | −10 | −10 |

Cumulative tournament scores, relative to par

| Birdie | Bogey |
