= Mount Juliet Golf & Spa Hotel =

Georgian house hotel in County Kilkenny, Ireland

Mount Juliet
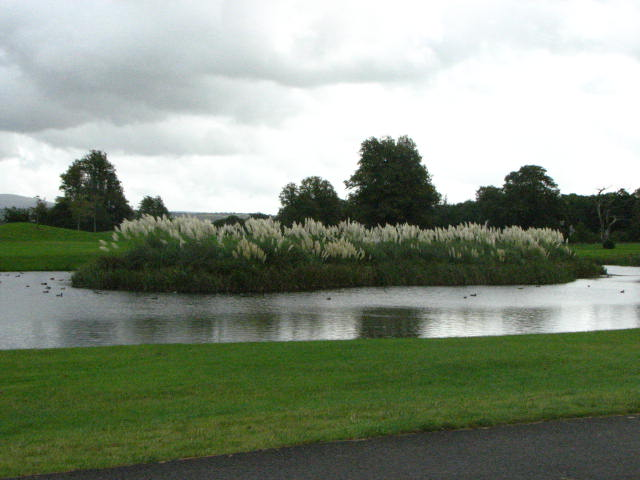
- Water feature in Mount Juliet

- Location within Ireland
- 52°31′33″N 7°11′19″W

Club information
- Location: Thomastown, County Kilkenny, Ireland
- Established: 1991
- Type: Private
- Owner: Tetrarch Group
- Tota holes: 18
- Tournaments: WGC-American Express Championship (2002, 2004); Irish Open (1993–95, 2021)
- Website: www.mountjuliet.ie

Jack Nicklaus Signature Course
- Designed by: Jack Nicklaus
- Par: 72
- Length: 7,264 yards (6,642 m)
- Course record: 62: Sergio García (2002); Retief Goosen (2002)

The Mount Juliet Hotel & Golf Course is situated in Mount Juliet Estate Thomastown, County Kilkenny, Ireland.

== History ==
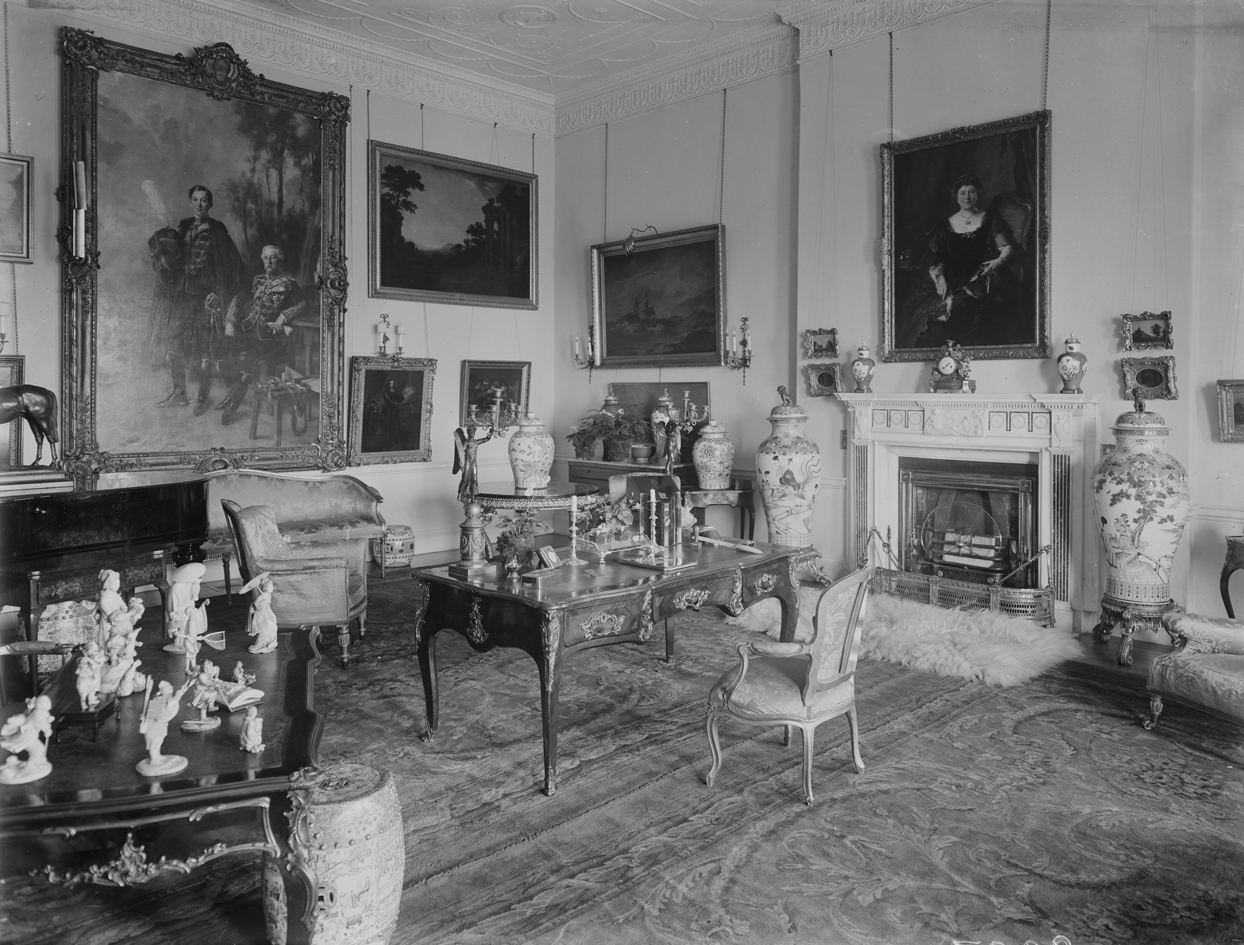
Drawing Room, Mount Juliet in the 1920s.

The estate developed from what was previously the lands of the Norman Walton family known as Walton's Grove and was owned by them until Oliver Cromwell seized the lands in 1653. This was combined with the area and townland known as Ballylinch (Irish: Baile Uí Loingsigh, meaning 'The town of Lynch') which was also dispossessed by Cromwell from a Norman family and later granted to one of his supporters. The surrounding area of Thomastown had originally been granted to Thomas FitzAnthony on the Norman conquest of Ireland and it is from this Thomas that the town got its name.

The Mount Juliet Estate was constructed by Somerset Butler, 1st Earl of Carrick between 1768-71 and named after his wife Juliet. It consists of a Georgian house set on a hill overlooking the River Nore, surrounded by over 1,500 acres (6.1 km^{2}) of land.

From the early 1900s the property and lands were owned by the McCalmont family including Hugh McCalmont and later his son Dermot McCalmont (1887–1968) who inherited a large fortune from his cousin Harry McCalmont. Extensive renovations and upgrading was carried out by them on the house in 1905-06.

The house and lands were sold to the Killeen Group in 1987, who proceeded to develop the estate, incorporating a hotel, stud, golf course and residential properties. The contents of the original house were also sold at auction by Sotheby's in 1986 and 1987.

In 2002, a deal was signed that saw the hotel, spa and stud join the Conrad Hotels brand operated by Hilton Hotels Corporation. That arrangement was terminated late in 2009.

In 2014, the estate was purchased by the Tetrarch group. The hotel also has a Michelin starred restaurant, the Lady Helen.

== Golf ==
The par 72, 7,300-yard (6,700 m) Jack Nicklaus designed golf course opened in 1991. It was voted the Best Parkland Golf Course in Ireland by Backspin Golf Magazine in 2008 and 2010. Other facilities at Mount Juliet include a driving range, practice putting greens and a golf academy.

Mount Juliet was the venue for the 2002 and 2004 WGC-American Express Championship, and hosted the European Tour's Irish Open on three occasions between 1993 and 1995. The course was also visited by Shell's Wonderful World of Golf in 1997, for a challenge match between Tom Watson and Fred Couples.
