= 2014 WGC-Cadillac Championship =

Coordinates: 25.815°N 80.340°W

Tournament information
- Dates: March 6–9, 2014
- Location: Doral, Florida, U.S.
- Course(s): Trump National Doral; Blue Monster Course
- Tour(s): PGA Tour; European Tour

Statistics
- Par: 72
- Length: 7,481 yards (6,841 m)
- Field: 68 players
- Cut: None
- Prize fund: $9,000,000 €6,596,935
- Winner's share: $1,530,000 €1,121,479

Champion
- (United States) Patrick Reed
- 284 (−4)

Location in the United States

The 2014 WGC-Cadillac Championship was a golf tournament played March 6–9 on the TPC Blue Monster course at Trump National Doral in Doral, Florida, a suburb west of Miami. It was the 15th WGC-Cadillac Championship tournament, and the second of the World Golf Championships events to be staged in 2014. Patrick Reed won his first WGC event and became the youngest WGC champion at age 23.

== Course layout ==
The tournament is played on the TPC Blue Monster course.

Hole	1	2	3	4	5	6	7	8	9	Out	10	11	12	13	14	15	16	17	18	In	Total
Yards	572	448	436	203	421	432	471	549	200	3,732	614	422	601	238	484	153	341	425	471	3,749	7,481
Par	5	4	4	3	4	4	4	5	3	36	5	4	5	3	4	3	4	4	4	36	72

== Field ==
The field consists of players from the top of the Official World Golf Ranking and the money lists/Order of Merit from the six main professional golf tours. Each player is classified according to the first category in which he qualified, but other categories are shown in parentheses.

1. The top 30 players from the final 2013 FedExCup Points List

Keegan Bradley (7,9), Roberto Castro, Brendon de Jonge, Graham DeLaet (7,9), Luke Donald (7,9), Jason Dufner (7,9), Jim Furyk (7,9), Sergio García (2,7,8,9), Bill Haas (7,9), Billy Horschel (7,9), Dustin Johnson (7,9,10), Zach Johnson (7,9,10), Matt Kuchar (7,9), Hunter Mahan (7,9), Phil Mickelson (7,9), D. A. Points, Justin Rose (2,7,9), Charl Schwartzel (7,8,9), Adam Scott (4,7,9), Webb Simpson (7,9,10), Brandt Snedeker (7,9), Jordan Spieth (7,9), Henrik Stenson (2,7,9), Kevin Streelman (7,9), Steve Stricker (7,9), Nick Watney (7,9), Boo Weekley, Gary Woodland, Tiger Woods (7,9)

Jason Day (7,9) withdrew prior to the first round with a thumb injury.

2. The top 20 players from the final 2013 European Tour Race to Dubai

Thomas Bjørn (7,8,9), Jamie Donaldson (7,8,9), Victor Dubuisson (7,8,9), Ernie Els (7,8,9), Gonzalo Fernández-Castaño (7,9), Stephen Gallacher (7,8,9), Branden Grace (8), Joost Luiten (7,9), Matteo Manassero (7,9), Graeme McDowell (7,9), Francesco Molinari (7,9), Ian Poulter (7,9), Brett Rumford, Richard Sterne, Thongchai Jaidee, Peter Uihlein, Lee Westwood (7,9)

3. The top 2 players from the final 2013 Japan Golf Tour Order of Merit

Kim Hyung-sung, Hideki Matsuyama (7,9)

4. The top 2 players from the final 2013 PGA Tour of Australasia Order of Merit

Jin Jeong

5. The top 2 players from the final 2013 Sunshine Tour Order of Merit

Darren Fichardt, Dawie van der Walt

6. The top 2 players from the final 2013 Asian Tour Order of Merit

Kiradech Aphibarnrat, Scott Hend

7. The top 50 players from the Official World Golf Ranking, as of February 24, 2014

Jonas Blixt (9), Harris English (9,10), Rickie Fowler (9), Miguel Ángel Jiménez (9), Martin Kaymer, Chris Kirk (9,10), Rory McIlroy (9), Ryan Moore (9,10), Louis Oosthuizen (8,9), Patrick Reed (9,10), Jimmy Walker (9,10), Bubba Watson (9,10)

8. The top 10 players from the 2014 European Tour Race to Dubai, as of February 24, 2014

George Coetzee

9. The top 50 players from the Official World Golf Ranking, as of March 3, 2014

Russell Henley

10. The top 10 players from the 2014 FedExCup Points List, as of March 3, 2014

Kevin Stadler

== Round summaries ==
=== First round ===
Thursday, March 6, 2014
Friday, March 7, 2014

Delays caused by thunderstorms meant that only six players completed their first round on Thursday. Five players led overnight at 3-under-par, including Harris English (the only one of the five to have completed his round), Jason Dufner, Hunter Mahan, Francesco Molinari and Patrick Reed.

Place	Player	Score	To par
1	(United States) Patrick Reed	68	−4
T2	(United States) Jason Dufner	69	−3
T2	(United States) Harris English	69	−3
T2	(United States) Dustin Johnson	69	−3
T2	(United States) Matt Kuchar	69	−3
T2	(United States) Hunter Mahan	69	−3
T2	(Italy) Francesco Molinari	69	−3
T8	(England) Luke Donald	70	−2
T8	(Spain) Miguel Ángel Jiménez	70	−2
T8	(United States) Zach Johnson	70	−2
T8	(Northern Ireland) Rory McIlroy	70	−2
T8	(United States) Ryan Moore	70	−2
T8	(South Africa) Charl Schwartzel	70	−2

=== Second round ===
Friday, March 7, 2014

Place	Player	Score	To par
T1	(United States) Dustin Johnson	69-74=143	−1
T1	(United States) Matt Kuchar	69-74=143	−1
T1	(United States) Hunter Mahan	69-74=143	−1
T1	(United States) Patrick Reed	68-75=143	−1
T5	(Wales) Jamie Donaldson	74-70=144	E
T5	(Northern Ireland) Graeme McDowell	73-71=144	E
T5	(Northern Ireland) Rory McIlroy	70-74=144	E
T5	(Italy) Francesco Molinari	69-75=144	E
T9	(United States) Zach Johnson	70-75=145	+1
T9	(United States) Bubba Watson	73-72=145	+1

=== Third round ===
Saturday, March 8, 2014

Place	Player	Score	To par
1	(United States) Patrick Reed	68-75-69=212	−4
T2	(United States) Jason Dufner	69-77-68=214	−2
T2	(United States) Hunter Mahan	69-74-71=214	−2
T4	(Wales) Jamie Donaldson	74-70-71=215	−1
T4	(United States) Tiger Woods	76-73-66=215	−1
T6	(Spain) Miguel Ángel Jiménez	70-77-69=216	E
T6	(United States) Dustin Johnson	69-74-73=216	E
T6	(United States) Zach Johnson	70-75-71=216	E
T9	(United States) Matt Kuchar	69-74-74=217	+1
T9	(Northern Ireland) Graeme McDowell	73-71-73=217	+1
T9	(South Africa) Richard Sterne	74-73-70=217	+1
T9	(United States) Jimmy Walker	73-77-67=217	+1
T9	(United States) Bubba Watson	73-72-72=217	+1

=== Final round ===
Sunday, March 9, 2014

Place	Player	Score	To par	Money ($)
1	(United States) Patrick Reed	68-75-69-72=284	−4	1,530,000
T2	(Wales) Jamie Donaldson	74-70-71-70=285	−3	753,000
T2	(United States) Bubba Watson	73-72-72-68=285	−3	753,000
T4	(United States) Dustin Johnson	69-74-73-72=288	E	395,000
T4	(South Africa) Richard Sterne	74-73-70-71=288	E	395,000
T6	(Scotland) Stephen Gallacher	75-75-70-69=289	+1	248,333
T6	(United States) Bill Haas	73-76-69-71=289	+1	248,333
T6	(Thailand) Thongchai Jaidee	73-74-74-68=289	+1	248,333
T9	(United States) Jason Dufner	69-77-68-76=290	+2	151,250
T9	(United States) Hunter Mahan	69-74-71-76=290	+2	151,250
T9	(Northern Ireland) Graeme McDowell	73-71-73-73=290	+2	151,250
T9	(South Africa) Charl Schwartzel	70-76-76-68=290	+2	151,250

==== Scorecard ====
Final round

Hole	1	2	3	4	5	6	7	8	9	10	11	12	13	14	15	16	17	18
Par	5	4	4	3	4	4	4	5	3	5	4	5	3	4	3	4	4	4
(United States) Reed	−5	−4	−5	−6	−6	−6	−6	−6	−6	−6	−6	−6	−6	−5	−5	−5	−5	−4
(Wales) Donaldson	−2	−2	−2	−2	−2	−2	−1	−1	−1	−2	−2	−2	−2	−3	−3	−3	−4	−3
(United States) Watson	+1	+1	+1	E	E	E	E	−1	−1	−1	−1	−1	−1	−1	−2	−3	−3	−3
(United States) D. Johnson	−2	−2	−2	−2	−1	−2	−3	−3	−2	−2	−2	−2	−1	−1	−1	−2	−2	E
(South Africa) Sterne	+1	+1	+2	+2	+2	+1	+1	E	E	+1	+1	E	+1	+1	+1	E	E	E
