= WGC Championship =

Golf tournament

Coordinates: 19.431°N 99.244°W

Tournament information
- Established: 1999
- Organized by: International Federation of PGA Tours
- Tours: PGA Tour; European Tour
- Format: Stroke play
- Prize fund: US$10,500,000 (final year)
- Month played: February
- Final year: 2021

Tournament record score
- Aggregate: 261 Tiger Woods (2006)
- To par: −25 Tiger Woods (2002)

Final champion
- (United States) Collin Morikawa

WGC Championship venues in North America
- CC=Capital City (x1)
- HP=Harding Park (x1)
- Do=Doral (x10)
- Ch=Chapultepec (x4)
- Co=The Concession (x1)
WGC Championship venues in Europe
- Va=Valderrama (x2)
- MJ=Mount Juliet (x2)
- Gr=The Grove (x1)

The WGC Championship was a professional golf tournament that was held between 1999 and 2021. It was one of the three or four annual World Golf Championships until the number of WGC events was reduced to two following the 2021 season.

Under sponsorship agreements, the WGC Championship was titled as the WGC-American Express Championship (1999–2006), when it was hosted at various locations in Europe and the United States; the WGC-CA Championship (2007–2010), then the WGC-Cadillac Championship (2011–2016), when it was hosted at Doral Golf Resort, Florida; and the WGC-Mexico Championship (2017–2020), when it was played at Club de Golf Chapultepec in Mexico. In 2021, the tournament was disrupted by travel restrictions due to the COVID-19 pandemic; it was relocated to The Concession Golf Club in Florida and titled as the WGC-Workday Championship.

It was sanctioned and organized by the International Federation of PGA Tours and the prize money was official money on both the PGA Tour and the European Tour. Tiger Woods had the record number of wins with seven. The winner received a Wedgwood trophy named the Gene Sarazen Cup.

== History ==
=== WGC-American Express Championship (1999–2006) ===
Founded in 1999, the first two events were held in November at the Valderrama Golf Club in Southern Spain. The third event was due to be held in Missouri, but was cancelled following the September 11 attacks in New York. The remaining five events were held in late September / early October, twice in Ireland and the United States, and once in England. The event was dominated by Tiger Woods who won five of the first seven editions.

=== Hosting at Doral Golf Resort, Florida (2007–2016) ===
In 2007 the PGA Tour introduced the FedEx Cup, and moved the Tour Championship forward to mid September. As the event was historically held after this date it would have meant that it would not have formed part of the PGA Tour regular season unless it was moved. The event was reinvented with a new sponsor (CA, Inc, and later Cadillac), a new hosting month (March), and a new permanent host (Doral, Florida). The decision to host on the Blue Monster course at Doral Golf Resort brought to an end the Ford Championship at Doral, a regular stop on the PGA Tour in March for 45 consecutive years (1962–2006). However, due to the WGC records taking precedence over PGA Tour records, technically the Cadillac Championship succeeded the American Express event, not the Ford Championship. With the WGC-World Cup losing its World Golf Championship status after the 2006 event, it meant all three remaining WGC events were permanently held in the United States which drew criticism from some players and commentators.

=== WGC-Mexico Championship (2017–2020) ===
After Cadillac decided not to renew sponsorship of the event, it moved to Club de Golf Chapultepec in Naucalpan, just northwest of Mexico City in 2017. Grupo Salinas took up sponsorship, although their name does not appear in the title of the tournament. Donald Trump had purchased and renamed Trump National Doral in 2012, and many saw the move as being driven by sponsors and the PGA Tour wanting to distance themselves from controversy. It was also an opportunity to counter criticism that not enough World Golf Championship events were held outside the United States. The Club de Golf Chapultepec is a tree-lined parkland course with tight fairways and undulating terrain, built approximately 1.36 miles (more than 7,800 feet) above sea level, which results in much longer ball flights than other golf events. In 2017 and 2018 it continued to be held in March, which meant it interrupted the PGA Tour's "Florida Swing", but in 2019 it was moved to February to follow events on the West Coast and precede the tournaments in Florida. The 2019 event was sold out due to being Tiger Woods' first professional appearance in Mexico.

=== WGC-Workday Championship (2021) ===
The 2021 event was originally scheduled to take place again in Mexico, but due to the COVID-19 pandemic, the event was moved to Florida in January 2021. On February 16, it was announced Workday, Inc. would become the new title sponsor. Collin Morikawa won the 2021 event by three strokes ahead of Billy Horschel, Viktor Hovland and Brooks Koepka.

In August 2021, the PGA Tour released its schedule for the 2021–22 season. It was confirmed that the Mexico Championship (WGC Championship) and the FedEx St. Jude Invitational (WGC Invitational) would no longer be part of the World Golf Championships.

== Structure ==
=== Field ===
The tournament consisted of a field of 72 players filled based upon the following criteria:

- Top 50 players from the Official World Golf Ranking (one week and two weeks prior to event)
- Top players from member tours' money lists or orders of merit (from last complete season)
  - Top 30 PGA Tour FedEx Cup list (also top 10 from one week prior to event)
  - Top 20 European Tour (also top 10 from two weeks prior to event)
  - Top 2 each from Asian Tour, Japan Golf Tour, PGA Tour of Australasia, and Sunshine Tour
- The highest ranked available player from Mexico in the Official World Golf Ranking (two weeks prior to event)
- Alternates to fill field to 72 (if necessary) from the Official World Golf Ranking (one week prior to event)

=== Format ===
The tournament was a 72-hole stroke play event with no cut. If there was a tie after 72 holes, there was a sudden death playoff to decide a winner. Only three playoffs occurred in the tournament's history; in 1999, 2005 and 2018; Tiger Woods being involved in two of them.

== Winners ==
Year	Tours (Note: EUR − European Tour; PGAT − PGA Tour.)	Winner	Score	To par	Margin of victory	Runner(s)-up	Purse ($)	Winner's share ($)	Location
WGC-Workday Championship
2021	EUR, PGAT	(United States) Collin Morikawa	270	−18	3 strokes	(United States) Billy Horschel (Norway) Viktor Hovland (United States) Brooks Koepka	10,500,000	1,820,000	Concession, Florida
WGC-Mexico Championship
2020	EUR, PGAT	(United States) Patrick Reed (2)	266	−18	1 stroke	(United States) Bryson DeChambeau	10,500,000	1,820,000	Chapultepec, Mexico
2019	EUR, PGAT	(United States) Dustin Johnson (3)	263	−21	5 strokes	(Northern Ireland) Rory McIlroy	10,250,000	1,745,000	Chapultepec, Mexico
2018	EUR, PGAT	(United States) Phil Mickelson (2)	268	−16	Playoff	(United States) Justin Thomas	10,000,000	1,700,000	Chapultepec, Mexico
2017	EUR, PGAT	(United States) Dustin Johnson (2)	270	−14	1 stroke	(England) Tommy Fleetwood	9,750,000	1,660,000	Chapultepec, Mexico
WGC-Cadillac Championship
2016	EUR, PGAT	(Australia) Adam Scott	276	−12	1 stroke	(United States) Bubba Watson	9,500,000	1,620,000	Doral, Florida
2015	EUR, PGAT	(United States) Dustin Johnson	279	−9	1 stroke	(United States) J. B. Holmes	9,250,000	1,572,500	Doral, Florida
2014	EUR, PGAT	(United States) Patrick Reed	284	−4	1 stroke	(Wales) Jamie Donaldson (United States) Bubba Watson	9,000,000	1,530,000	Doral, Florida
2013	EUR, PGAT	(United States) Tiger Woods (7)	269	−19	2 strokes	(United States) Steve Stricker	8,750,000	1,500,000	Doral, Florida
2012	EUR, PGAT	(England) Justin Rose	272	−16	1 stroke	(United States) Bubba Watson	8,500,000	1,400,000	Doral, Florida
2011	EUR, PGAT	(United States) Nick Watney	272	−16	2 strokes	(United States) Dustin Johnson	8,500,000	1,400,000	Doral, Florida
WGC-CA Championship
2010	EUR, PGAT	(South Africa) Ernie Els (2)	270	−18	4 strokes	(South Africa) Charl Schwartzel	8,500,000	1,400,000	Doral, Florida
2009	EUR, PGAT	(United States) Phil Mickelson	269	−19	1 stroke	(United States) Nick Watney	8,500,000	1,400,000	Doral, Florida
2008	EUR, PGAT	(Australia) Geoff Ogilvy	271	−17	1 stroke	(United States) Jim Furyk (South Africa) Retief Goosen (Fiji) Vijay Singh	8,000,000	1,350,000	Doral, Florida
2007	EUR, PGAT	(United States) Tiger Woods (6)	278	−10	2 strokes	(United States) Brett Wetterich	8,000,000	1,350,000	Doral, Florida
WGC-American Express Championship
2006	EUR, PGAT	(United States) Tiger Woods (5)	261	−23	8 strokes	(England) Ian Poulter (Australia) Adam Scott	7,500,000	1,300,000	The Grove, England
2005	EUR, PGAT	(United States) Tiger Woods (4)	270	−10	Playoff	(United States) John Daly	7,500,000	1,300,000	Harding Park, California
2004	EUR, PGAT	(South Africa) Ernie Els	270	−18	1 stroke	(Denmark) Thomas Bjørn	7,000,000	1,200,000	Mount Juliet, Ireland
2003	EUR, PGAT	(United States) Tiger Woods (3)	274	−6	2 strokes	(Australia) Stuart Appleby (United States) Tim Herron (Fiji) Vijay Singh	6,000,000	1,050,000	Capital City, Georgia
2002	EUR, PGAT	(United States) Tiger Woods (2)	263	−25	1 stroke	(South Africa) Retief Goosen	5,500,000	1,000,000	Mount Juliet, Ireland
2001	EUR, PGAT	Canceled due to September 11 attacks							Bellerive, Missouri
2000	EUR, PGAT	(Canada) Mike Weir	277	−7	2 strokes	(England) Lee Westwood	5,000,000	1,000,000	Valderrama, Spain
1999	EUR, PGAT	(United States) Tiger Woods	278	−6	Playoff	(Spain) Miguel Ángel Jiménez	5,000,000	1,000,000	Valderrama, Spain

Note: Green highlight indicates scoring records.

== See also ==
- Winners of the Doral Open (1962–2006), also played at Doral Golf Resort & Spa's Blue Monster Course
