= 2017 WGC-Mexico Championship =

Coordinates: 19.431°N 99.244°W

Tournament information
- Dates: March 2–5, 2017
- Location: Naucalpan, Mexico
- Course: Club de Golf Chapultepec
- Tour(s): PGA Tour; European Tour

Statistics
- Par: 71
- Length: 7,330 yards (6,703 m)
- Field: 77 players
- Cut: None
- Prize fund: $9,750,000 €9,183,384
- Winner's share: $1,660,000 €1,563,530

Champion
- (United States) Dustin Johnson
- 270 (−14)

Location in Mexico

The 2017 WGC-Mexico Championship was a golf tournament played March 2–5 at Club de Golf Chapultepec in Naucalpan, Mexico, just west of Mexico City. It was the 18th time the WGC Championship has been played, and the first of the World Golf Championships events to be staged in 2017. The approximate elevation of the course's clubhouse is 2,400 meters (7,870 ft) above sea level. The Championship was won by Dustin Johnson in his first tournament as the World number 1.

== Course layout ==
Club de Golf Chapultepec

Hole	1	2	3	4	5	6	7	8	9	Out	10	11	12	13	14	15	16	17	18	In	Total
Yards	316	387	186	506	445	625	235	525	382	3,607	450	622	406	225	482	575	403	172	388	3,723	7,330
Meters	289	354	170	463	407	572	215	480	349	3,299	411	569	371	206	441	526	369	157	355	3,405	6,704
Par	4	4	3	4	4	5	3	4	4	35	4	5	4	3	4	5	4	3	4	36	71

== Field ==
The field consisted of players from the top of the Official World Golf Ranking and the money lists/Orders of Merit from the six main professional golf tours. Each player is classified according to the first category in which he qualified, but other categories are shown in parentheses.

1. The top 50 players from the Official World Golf Ranking, as of February 20, 2017

An Byeong-hun (2), Daniel Berger (2,3), Rafa Cabrera-Bello (2,5,6), Paul Casey (2,3), Kevin Chappell (2,3), Matt Fitzpatrick (2,5), Rickie Fowler (2,4), Jim Furyk (2), Sergio García (2,6), Branden Grace (2,5), Emiliano Grillo (2,3), Bill Haas (2), Tyrrell Hatton (2,5), J. B. Holmes (2,3), Yuta Ikeda (2,7), Dustin Johnson (2,3,4), Zach Johnson (2), Kevin Kisner (2,3), Russell Knox (2,3), Brooks Koepka (2), Matt Kuchar (2,3), Hideki Matsuyama (2,3,4), William McGirt (3), Rory McIlroy (2,3,5), Phil Mickelson (2,3), Francesco Molinari (2,5), Ryan Moore (2,3), Kevin Na (2,3), Alex Norén (2,5), Louis Oosthuizen (2,5), Scott Piercy (2), Thomas Pieters (2), Jon Rahm (2,4), Patrick Reed (2,3), Justin Rose (2), Charl Schwartzel (2,3), Adam Scott (2,3), Brandt Snedeker (2,3), Jordan Spieth (2,3,4), Henrik Stenson (2,5,6), Justin Thomas (2,3,4), Jimmy Walker (2,3), Wang Jeung-hun (2,5,6), Bubba Watson (2,3), Lee Westwood (2,5), Bernd Wiesberger (2,5,6), Danny Willett (2,5), Chris Wood (5), Gary Woodland (2,3,4)

- Jason Day (2,3) did not compete due to illness.

2. The top 50 players from the Official World Golf Ranking, as of February 27, 2017

Martin Kaymer (5), Brendan Steele (4)

3. The top 30 players from the final 2016 FedExCup Points List

Roberto Castro, Jason Dufner, Kim Si-woo, Sean O'Hair, Jhonattan Vegas

4. The top 10 players from the 2017 FedExCup Points List, as of February 27, 2017

Mackenzie Hughes, Pat Perez

5. The top 20 players from the final 2016 European Tour Race to Dubai

Ross Fisher, Søren Kjeldsen, Joost Luiten, Thorbjørn Olesen, Andy Sullivan

6. The top 10 players from the 2017 European Tour Race to Dubai, as of February 20, 2017

Sam Brazel, Tommy Fleetwood, Pablo Larrazábal, David Lipsky, Fabrizio Zanotti

7. The top 2 players from the final 2016 Japan Golf Tour Order of Merit

Kim Kyung-tae, Hideto Tanihara

8. The top 2 players from the final 2016 PGA Tour of Australasia Order of Merit

Matthew Griffin, Michael Hendry

9. The top 2 players from the 2016 Sunshine Tour Order of Merit as of December 5

Richard Sterne, Brandon Stone

10. The top 2 players from the final 2016 Asian Tour Order of Merit

Marcus Fraser, Scott Hend

11. The highest ranked available player from Mexico from the Official World Golf Ranking as of February 20, 2017

Roberto Díaz

== Round summaries ==
=== First round ===
Thursday, March 2, 2017

Place	Player	Score	To par
T1	(England) Ross Fisher	67	−4
T1	(United States) Phil Mickelson	67	−4
T1	(United States) Ryan Moore	67	−4
T1	(Spain) Jon Rahm	67	−4
T1	(United States) Jimmy Walker	67	−4
T1	(England) Lee Westwood	67	−4
T7	(Spain) Sergio García	68	−3
T7	(United States) Matt Kuchar	68	−3
T7	(Northern Ireland) Rory McIlroy	68	−3
T7	(United States) Pat Perez	68	−3
T7	(Belgium) Thomas Pieters	68	−3
T7	(England) Chris Wood	68	−3
T7	(Paraguay) Fabrizio Zanotti	68	−3

=== Second round ===
Friday, March 3, 2017

Place	Player	Score	To par
1	(Northern Ireland) Rory McIlroy	68-65=133	−9
T2	(England) Ross Fisher	67-68=135	−7
T2	(United States) Phil Mickelson	67-68=135	−7
T2	(United States) Justin Thomas	69-66=135	−7
T5	(United States) Daniel Berger	70-66=136	−6
T5	(United States) Dustin Johnson	70-66=136	−6
T5	(England) Andy Sullivan	71-65=136	−6
T8	(United States) Roberto Castro	69-68=137	−5
T8	(England) Tyrrell Hatton	70-67=137	−5
T8	(United States) J. B. Holmes	69-68=137	−5
T8	(Germany) Martin Kaymer	70-67=137	−5
T8	(Belgium) Thomas Pieters	68-69=137	−5
T8	(Spain) Jon Rahm	67-70=137	−5
T8	(Paraguay) Fabrizio Zanotti	68-69=137	−5

=== Third round ===
Saturday, March 4, 2017

Place	Player	Score	To par
1	(United States) Justin Thomas	69-66-66=201	−12
2	(United States) Dustin Johnson	70-66-66=202	−11
T3	(Northern Ireland) Rory McIlroy	68-65-70=203	−10
T3	(United States) Phil Mickelson	67-68-68=203	−10
T5	(Spain) Jon Rahm	67-70-67=204	−9
T5	(England) Lee Westwood	67-71-66=204	−9
T7	(England) Tommy Fleetwood	69-70-66=205	−8
T7	(England) Tyrrell Hatton	70-67-68=205	−8
T7	(Belgium) Thomas Pieters	68-69-68=205	−8
T10	(United States) Daniel Berger	70-66-70=206	−7
T10	(United States) J. B. Holmes	69-68-69=206	−7
T10	(United States) Matt Kuchar	68-71-67=206	−7
T10	(United States) Jordan Spieth	71-72-63=206	−7

=== Final round ===
Sunday, March 5, 2017

Place	Player	Score	To par	Money (US$)
1	(United States) Dustin Johnson	70-66-66-68=270	−14	1,660,000
2	(England) Tommy Fleetwood	69-70-66-66=271	−13	1,045,000
T3	(England) Ross Fisher	67-68-72-65=272	−12	497,000
T3	(Spain) Jon Rahm	67-70-67-68=272	−12	497,000
T5	(Belgium) Thomas Pieters	68-69-68-68=273	−11	312,500
T5	(United States) Justin Thomas	69-66-66-72=273	−11	312,500
T7	(Northern Ireland) Rory McIlroy	68-65-70-71=274	−10	211,667
T7	(United States) Phil Mickelson	67-68-68-71=274	−10	211,667
T7	(United States) Brandt Snedeker	75-68-66-65=274	−10	211,667
10	(England) Tyrrell Hatton	70-67-68-70=275	−9	166,000

==== Scorecard ====
Eagle	Birdie	Bogey	Double bogey

Final round

Hole	1	2	3	4	5	6	7	8	9	10	11	12	13	14	15	16	17	18
Par	4	4	3	4	4	5	3	4	4	4	5	4	3	4	5	4	3	4
(United States) Johnson	−11	−12	−12	−12	−12	−13	−13	−14	−14	−15	−15	−14	−13	−13	−14	−14	−14	−14
(England) Fleetwood	−9	−9	−9	−9	−9	−10	−10	−9	−9	−9	−10	−11	−11	−11	−12	−12	−12	−13
(England) Fisher	−5	−5	−6	−7	−6	−7	−7	−7	−8	−8	−9	−10	−10	−9	−9	−10	−11	−12
(Spain) Rahm	−10	−10	−10	−10	−9	−10	−10	−10	−10	−10	−12	−12	−12	−13	−14	−13	−12	−12
(Belgium) Pieters	−9	−10	−10	−11	−11	−11	−11	−11	−11	−11	−11	−11	−11	−11	−11	−11	−12	−11
(United States) Thomas	−13	−12	−12	−11	−12	−12	−10	−9	−9	−9	−10	−10	−9	−10	−11	−11	−11	−11
(Northern Ireland) McIlroy	−10	−10	−9	−9	−9	−10	−9	−9	−9	−9	−9	−9	−9	−10	−10	−10	−10	−10
(United States) Mickelson	−9	−9	−9	−9	−9	−10	−9	−7	−7	−7	−9	−9	−9	−9	−10	−10	−10	−10
(United States) Snedeker	−5	−5	−5	−5	−6	−6	−6	−6	−6	−6	−7	−8	−8	−8	−9	−10	−11	−10
(England) Hatton	−8	−8	−9	−9	−9	−9	−9	−8	−8	−8	−8	−8	−8	−8	−10	−9	−9	−9
