= 2002 WGC-American Express Championship =

Tournament information
- Dates: 19–22 September 2002
- Location: Thomastown, County Kilkenny, Ireland; 52.526°N 7.189°W
- Course: Mount Juliet Golf Course
- Tours: PGA Tour; European Tour

Statistics
- Par: 72
- Length: 7,246
- Field: 65 players
- Cut: None
- Prize fund: $5,000,000
- Winner's share: $1,000,000

Champion
- (United States) Tiger Woods
- 263 (−25)
- Location in Ireland

The 2002 WGC-American Express Championship was a golf tournament that was contested from 19 to 22 September at Mount Juliet Golf Course in Thomastown, County Kilkenny, Ireland. It was the third WGC-American Express Championship tournament, following the cancellation of the 2001 edition in the aftermath of the September 11 attacks, and the third of four World Golf Championships events in 2002.

World number 1 Tiger Woods won the tournament, to capture his second WGC-American Express Championship and his fifth World Golf Championship. He set the tournament record for score to-par at 25 under. Woods also went the first 71 holes of the tournament without making a bogey, only bogeying the 18th hole in the final round.

== Field ==
1. Top 50 from the Official World Golf Ranking as of 9 September

Robert Allenby (2), Stuart Appleby, Paul Azinger, Rich Beem (2), Thomas Bjørn (3), Ángel Cabrera (3), Mark Calcavecchia, Michael Campbell (3), Darren Clarke, José Cóceres, John Cook, Chris DiMarco (2), David Duval, Ernie Els (2,3), Bob Estes (2), Niclas Fasth (3), Brad Faxon (2), Fred Funk (2), Jim Furyk (2), Sergio García (2,3), Retief Goosen (2,3,5), Pádraig Harrington (3), Scott Hoch, Jerry Kelly (2), Bernhard Langer, Paul Lawrie (3), Tom Lehman, Justin Leonard (2), Peter Lonard, Davis Love III (2), Steve Lowery (2), Shigeki Maruyama (2), Len Mattiace (2), Scott McCarron (2), Rocco Mediate (2), Phil Mickelson (2), Colin Montgomerie (3), Craig Parry (4), Kenny Perry (2), Nick Price (2), Chris Riley (2), Eduardo Romero (3), Justin Rose (3,5), Adam Scott (3), Vijay Singh (2), David Toms (2), Scott Verplank, Mike Weir, Tiger Woods (2)

2. Top 30 on the 2002 PGA Tour money list as of 9 September

Craig Perks, John Rollins, Jeff Sluman, Kevin Sutherland

3. Top 20 on the 2002 European Tour Order of Merit as of 9 September

Gary Evans, Anders Hansen, Søren Hansen, Trevor Immelman, Stephen Leaney, Carl Pettersson

4. Top 3 on the 2002 PGA Tour of Australasia Order of Merit as of 9 September

Scott Laycock, Peter O'Malley

5. Top 3 on the 2001–02 Sunshine Tour Order of Merit

Tim Clark

6. Top 3 on the 2002 Japan Golf Tour Order of Merit as of 9 September

Kenichi Kuboya

- Nobuhito Sato and Toru Taniguchi did not play.

7. Winner of the 2001 Asian PGA Tour Order of Merit

Thongchai Jaidee

== Round summaries ==
=== First round ===
Place	Player	Score	To par
1	(United States) Tiger Woods	65	−7
T2	(United States) Steve Lowery	66	−6
T2	(United States) David Toms	66	−6
T4	(United States) Chris DiMarco	67	−5
T4	(England) Gary Evans	67	−5
T4	(South Africa) Retief Goosen	67	−5
T4	(United States) Jerry Kelly	67	−5
T4	(Fiji) Vijay Singh	67	−5
T4	(Canada) Mike Weir	67	−5
T10	(Argentina) José Cóceres	68	−4
T10	(South Africa) Ernie Els	68	−4
T10	(United States) Bob Estes	68	−4
T10	(Sweden) Niclas Fasth	68	−4
T10	(United States) Justin Leonard	68	−4
T10	(Spain) José María Olazábal	68	−4
T10	(Australia) Craig Parry	68	−4
T10	(United States) Kenny Perry	68	−4
T10	(Zimbabwe) Nick Price	68	−4
T10	(United States) Scott Verplank	68	−4

=== Second round ===
Place	Player	Score	To par
1	(United States) Tiger Woods	65-65=130	−14
2	(United States) Jerry Kelly	67-65=132	−12
T3	(United States) Steve Lowery	66-67=133	−11
T3	(United States) David Toms	66-67=133	−11
5	(South Africa) Retief Goosen	67-67=134	−10
T6	(Australia) Stuart Appleby	69-66=135	−9
T6	(South Africa) Ernie Els	68-67=135	−9
T6	(England) Gary Evans	67-68=135	−9
T9	(United States) Chris DiMarco	67-69=136	−8
T9	(United States) Bob Estes	68-68=136	−8
T9	(Australia) Stephen Leaney	69-67=136	−8
T9	(United States) Justin Leonard	68-68=136	−8
T9	(United States) Davis Love III	69-67=136	−8
T9	(United States) Rocco Mediate	69-67=136	−8
T9	(Fiji) Vijay Singh	67-69=136	−8

=== Third round ===
Place	Player	Score	To par
1	(United States) Tiger Woods	65-65-67=197	−19
T2	(South Africa) Retief Goosen	67-67-68=202	−14
T2	(United States) Jerry Kelly	67-65-70=202	−14
T2	(United States) Steve Lowery	66-67-69=202	−14
T2	(United States) Scott McCarron	71-67-64=202	−14
T2	(Fiji) Vijay Singh	67-69-66=202	−14
T2	(United States) David Toms	66-67-69=202	−14
8	(United States) Rocco Mediate	69-67-67=203	−13
9	(United States) Davis Love III	69-67-68=204	−12
T10	(Australia) Stuart Appleby	69-66-70=205	−11
T10	(United States) Bob Estes	68-68-69=205	−11
T10	(United States) Justin Leonard	68-68-69=205	−11
T10	(Canada) Mike Weir	67-70-68=205	−11

=== Final round ===
Place	Player	Score	To par	Money ($)
1	(United States) Tiger Woods	65-65-67-66=263	−25	1,000,000
2	(South Africa) Retief Goosen	67-67-68-62=264	−24	540,000
3	(Fiji) Vijay Singh	67-69-66-65=267	−21	367,500
T4	(United States) Jerry Kelly	67-65-70-66=268	−20	235,000
T4	(United States) David Toms	66-67-69-66=268	−20	235,000
6	(United States) Scott McCarron	71-67-64-67=269	−19	180,000
7	(Spain) Sergio García	69-69-70-62=270	−18	155,000
8	(United States) Davis Love III	69-67-68-67=271	−17	130,000
T9	(New Zealand) Michael Campbell	71-66-71-64=272	−16	111,000
T9	(United States) Bob Estes	68-68-69-67=272	−16	111,000
