= 2019 FedEx Cup Playoffs =

Tournament information
- Dates: August 8–25, 2019
- Location: Liberty National Golf Club; Medinah Country Club; East Lake Golf Club
- Tour: PGA Tour

Statistics
- Field: 125 for The Northern Trust; 70 for BMW Championship; 30 for Tour Championship
- Prize fund: $60 million (bonus money)
- Winner's share: $15 million (bonus money)

Champion
- (Northern Ireland) Rory McIlroy
- −18

The 2019 FedEx Cup Playoffs, the series of three golf tournaments that will determine the season champion on the U.S.-based PGA Tour, was played from August 8–25. It included the following three events:

- The Northern Trust – Liberty National Golf Club, Jersey City, New Jersey
- BMW Championship – Medinah Country Club, Medinah, Illinois
- Tour Championship – East Lake Golf Club, Atlanta, Georgia

They were the 13th FedEx Cup playoffs since their inception in 2007.

The point distributions can be seen here.

== Changes for 2019 ==
There were a number of changes in the format compared to previous years.

- The playoffs were moved to an earlier date, finishing by the end of August rather than in late September.
- There were only 3 events rather than 4, with the Dell Technologies Championship being dropped. The leading 70 players after The Northern Trust qualified for the BMW Championship whereas previously the leading 100 qualified for the Dell Technologies Championship, after which the leading 70 qualified for the BMW Championship.
- An additional bonus pool, the Wyndham Rewards Top 10, was distributed among the leading 10 players after the Wyndham Championship which ended the regular season. The pool was $10 million with the leader receiving $2 million.
- The FedEx Cup bonus pool was increased from $35 to $60 million, with the winner's share increasing from $10 to $15 million.
- Major changes were made to the Tour Championship format. In the new system players will receive a stroke advantage based on their position in the FedEx Cup rankings after the BMW Championship. The FedExCup leader will start the Tour Championship at −10, number two at −8, number three at −7, number four at −6 and number five at −5. Players ranked 6 to 10 will start at −4, 11 to 15 at −3, 16 to 20 at −2, 21 to 25 at −1 and 26 to 30 will start from 0. The winner of the Tour Championship will be the FedEx Cup winner.
  (Previously each player's points total was reset after the BMW Championship based on their position in the rankings at that stage. These reset points, added to the points earned in the Tour Championship, determined the final FedEx Cup rankings.)
- For the purposes of the Official World Golf Ranking, the stroke advantages in the Tour Championship were ignored.

== Regular season rankings ==
Place	Player	Points	Events	Wyndham Rewards Top 10 bonus ($)
1	(United States) Brooks Koepka	2,887	18	2,000,000
2	(Northern Ireland) Rory McIlroy	2,315	16	1,500,000
3	(United States) Matt Kuchar	2,313	19	1,200,000
4	(United States) Xander Schauffele	1,858	18	1,100,000
5	(United States) Gary Woodland	1,795	21	1,000,000
6	(United States) Patrick Cantlay	1,730	18	850,000
7	(United States) Dustin Johnson	1,686	16	700,000
8	(England) Paul Casey	1,629	20	600,000
9	(United States) Webb Simpson	1,619	18	550,000
10	(Spain) Jon Rahm	1,447	17	500,000

== The Northern Trust ==
The Northern Trust was played August 8–11. Of the 125 players eligible to play in the event, four did not play: Paul Casey (ranked 8th), Rafa Cabrera-Bello (59), Henrik Stenson (85) and Sam Burns (89), reducing the field to 121. 85 players made the second-round cut at 141 (−1).

Patrick Reed won by a stroke over Abraham Ancer. The top 70 players in the points standings advanced to the BMW Championship. This included four players who were outside the top 70 prior to The Northern Trust: Troy Merritt (ranked 72nd to 59th), Joaquín Niemann (74 to 70), Wyndham Clark (90 to 68), and Harold Varner III (102 to 29). Four players started the tournament within the top 70 but ended the tournament outside the top 70, ending their playoff chances: Sergio García (ranked 65th to 72nd), Danny Lee (66 to 73), Kevin Streelman (68 to 75), and Matthew Wolff (70 to 74).

					FedEx Cup rank	
Place	Player	Score	To par	Winnings ($)	After	Before
1	(United States) Patrick Reed	66-66-67-69=268	−16	1,665,000	2	50
2	(Mexico) Abraham Ancer	67-65-68-69=269	−15	999,000	8	67
T3	(Spain) Jon Rahm	64-68-69-69=270	−14	536,500	5	10
T3	(United States) Harold Varner III	67-67-68-68=270	−14	536,500	29	102
5	(Australia) Adam Scott	68-69-69-65=271	−13	370,000	14	21
T6	(Northern Ireland) Rory McIlroy	65-68-70-69=272	−12	299,469	3	2
T6	(South Africa) Louis Oosthuizen	68-65-70-69=272	−12	299,469	28	51
T6	(United States) Brandt Snedeker	71-67-63-71=272	−12	299,469	22	33
T6	(United States) Jordan Spieth	67-64-74-67=272	−12	299,469	44	69
T10	(England) Ian Poulter	68-66-71-68=273	−11	240,500	43	60
T10	(England) Justin Rose	65-68-69-71=273	−11	240,500	12	11

- Par 71 course

== BMW Championship ==
The BMW Championship was played August 15–18. Of the 70 players eligible to play in the event, only Kevin Na (ranked 55th) did not play, reducing the field to 69. There was no second-round cut.

Justin Thomas won by 3 strokes from Patrick Cantlay. The top 30 players in the points standings advanced to the Tour Championship. This included three players who were outside the top 30 prior to the BMW Championship: Jason Kokrak (ranked 32nd to 30th), Hideki Matsuyama (33 to 15), and Lucas Glover (41 to 29). Three players started the tournament within the top 30 but ended the tournament outside the top 30, ending their playoff chances: Shane Lowry (25 to 33), Harold Varner III (29 to 38) and Andrew Putnam (30 to 34).

					FedEx Cup rank	
Place	Player	Score	To par	Winnings ($)	After	Before
1	(United States) Justin Thomas	65-69-61-68=263	−25	1,665,000	1	15
2	(United States) Patrick Cantlay	66-67-68-65=266	−22	999,000	2	6
3	(Japan) Hideki Matsuyama	69-63-73-63=268	−20	629,000	15	33
4	(United States) Tony Finau	67-66-68-69=270	−18	444,000	12	19
T5	(Spain) Jon Rahm	68-69-66-69=272	−16	351,500	6	5
T5	(United States) Brandt Snedeker	66-71-67-68=272	−16	351,500	18	22
T7	(Canada) Corey Conners	69-66-69-69=273	−15	298,312	23	27
T7	(United States) Lucas Glover	66-69-69-69=273	−15	298,312	29	41
T9	(United States) Kevin Kisner	68-68-69-69=274	−14	259,000	20	21
T9	(Australia) Adam Scott	67-71-69-67=274	−14	259,000	13	14

- Par 72 course

== Points after BMW Championship ==
Place	Player	Points	Events
1	(United States) Justin Thomas	3,475	19
2	(United States) Patrick Cantlay	3,157	20
3	(United States) Brooks Koepka	3,119	20
4	(United States) Patrick Reed	2,946	24
5	(Northern Ireland) Rory McIlroy	2,842	18
6	(Spain) Jon Rahm	2,517	19
7	(United States) Matt Kuchar	2,339	21
8	(United States) Xander Schauffele	2,030	20
9	(United States) Webb Simpson	1,946	20
10	(Mexico) Abraham Ancer	1,940	26

== Tour Championship ==
The Tour Championship was played August 22–25. 30 golfers qualified for the tournament. There was no second-round cut. Rory McIlroy won the event, finishing four strokes ahead of Xander Schauffele. McIlroy had started the tournament at −5, a one stroke advantage over Schauffele who started at −4.

Place	Player	Round scores	Starting score	Final score	FedEx Cup rank		Winnings ($)
Place	Player	Round scores	Starting score	Final score	After	Before	Winnings ($)
1	(Northern Ireland) Rory McIlroy	66-67-68-66=267	−5	−18	1	5	15,000,000
2	(United States) Xander Schauffele	64-69-67-70=270	−4	−14	2	8	5,000,000
T3	(United States) Brooks Koepka	67-67-68-72=274	−7	−13	T3	3	3,500,000
T3	(United States) Justin Thomas	70-68-71-68=277	−10	−13	T3	1	3,500,000
5	(England) Paul Casey	66-67-68-72=273	−2	−9	5	16	2,500,000
6	(Australia) Adam Scott	68-70-71-66=275	−3	−8	6	13	1,900,000
7	(United States) Tony Finau	70-69-70-67=276	−3	−7	7	12	1,300,000
8	(United States) Chez Reavie	71-64-70-70=275	−1	−6	8	25	1,100,000
T9	(United States) Kevin Kisner	71-70-68-68=277	−2	−5	T9	20	843,333
T9	(Japan) Hideki Matsuyama	66-75-66-71=278	−3	−5	T9	15	843,333
T9	(United States) Patrick Reed	70-70-73-68=281	−6	−5	T9	4	843,333

- Par 70 course

For the full list see here.

== Table of qualified players ==
Table key:

Win
Top-10 finish
Did not advance to next tournament
Played way into next tournament

	Player	Pre-Playoffs		The Northern Trust		BMW Championship		Tour Championship		
	Player	Points	Rank	Finish	Rank after	Finish	Rank after	Starting score	Final score	Final rank
(United States)	Brooks Koepka	2,887	1	T30	1	T24	3	−7	−13	T3
(Northern Ireland)	Rory McIlroy	2,315	2	T6	3	T19	5	−5	−18	1
(United States)	Matt Kuchar	2,313	3	CUT	4	T52	7	−4	−1	T16
(United States)	Xander Schauffele	1,858	4	CUT	7	T19	8	−4	−14	2
(United States)	Gary Woodland	1,795	5	T52	9	T31	11	−3	−2	15
(United States)	Patrick Cantlay	1,730	6	T12	6	2	2	−8	+1	T21
(United States)	Dustin Johnson	1,686	7	T24	10	T57	14	−3	+10	T29
(England)	Paul Casey	1,629	8	DNP	13	T24	16	−2	−9	5
(United States)	Webb Simpson	1,619	9	T18	11	T24	9	−4	−1	T16
(Spain)	Jon Rahm	1,447	10	T3	5	T5	6	−4	−4	T12
(England)	Justin Rose	1,423	11	T10	12	T52	17	−2	+3	T26
(Australia)	Marc Leishman	1,415	12	CUT	16	T19	21	−1	+2	T24
(United States)	Rickie Fowler	1,391	13	CUT	17	T11	19	−2	E	T19
(United States)	Chez Reavie	1,309	14	T38	18	T57	25	−1	−6	8
(United States)	Charles Howell III	1,279	15	CUT	23	T37	28	E	+4	28
(United States)	Tony Finau	1,279	16	T30	19	4	12	−3	−7	7
(United States)	Justin Thomas	1,247	17	T12	15	1	1	−10	−13	T3
(United States)	Bryson DeChambeau	1,203	18	T24	20	T48	26	E	−4	T12
(England)	Tommy Fleetwood	1,193	19	T43	24	T11	22	−1	−1	T16
(Republic of Ireland)	Shane Lowry	1,137	20	T52	25	T48	33	–	–	33
(Australia)	Adam Scott	1,124	21	5	14	T9	13	−3	−8	6
(United States)	Kevin Kisner	1,098	22	T12	21	T9	20	−2	−5	T9
(South Korea)	Im Sung-jae*	1,097	23	T38	26	T11	24	−1	E	T19
(United States)	Ryan Palmer	1,088	24	T77	31	T43	35	–	–	35
(Italy)	Francesco Molinari	1,054	25	82	34	T61	40	–	–	40
(United States)	Scott Piercy	1,025	26	T67	35	T37	39	–	–	39
(United States)	J. T. Poston	1,015	27	T59	36	T16	32	–	–	32
(United States)	Tiger Woods	1,003	28	WD	38	T37	42	–	–	42
(South Korea)	Kang Sung-hoon	986	29	CUT	42	T63	45	–	–	45
(Japan)	Hideki Matsuyama	969	30	T30	33	3	15	−3	−5	T9
(Canada)	Corey Conners	962	31	T21	27	T7	23	−1	+3	T26
(United States)	Lucas Glover	947	32	T43	41	T7	29	E	+10	T29
(United States)	Brandt Snedeker	934	33	T6	22	T5	18	−2	+2	T24
(United States)	Phil Mickelson	903	34	T71	46	T48	47	–	–	47
(Taiwan)	Pan Cheng-tsung	900	35	T24	37	T31	37	–	–	37
(Slovakia)	Rory Sabbatini	895	36	T43	45	T16	36	–	–	36
(United States)	Keith Mitchell	884	37	T64	47	T52	50	–	–	50
(United States)	Andrew Putnam	873	38	T12	30	T43	34	–	–	34
(United States)	Jim Furyk	865	39	T52	48	T57	51	–	–	51
(Australia)	Jason Day	865	40	CUT	50	T52	54	–	–	54
(United States)	Kevin Tway	863	41	T24	40	T11	31	–	–	31
(United States)	Jason Kokrak	854	42	T12	32	T19	30	E	−3	14
(United States)	Nate Lashley*	836	43	CUT	54	69	57	–	–	57
(United States)	Billy Horschel	835	44	T21	39	T37	43	–	–	43
(South Korea)	Kim Si-woo	832	45	84	53	T28	46	–	–	46
(Canada)	Adam Hadwin	818	46	T43	51	T43	52	–	–	52
(United States)	J. B. Holmes	815	47	T52	52	T65	56	–	–	56
(United States)	Kevin Na	815	48	T77	55	DNP	61	–	–	61
(United States)	Collin Morikawa*	780	49	T52	57	T48	59	–	–	59
(United States)	Patrick Reed	774	50	1	2	T19	4	−6	−5	T9
(South Africa)	Louis Oosthuizen	754	51	T6	28	T11	27	E	+1	T21
(United States)	Max Homa*	742	52	T38	56	T61	60	–	–	60
(South Africa)	Dylan Frittelli*	735	53	T43	60	T52	63	–	–	63
(Northern Ireland)	Graeme McDowell	729	54	CUT	64	T57	68	–	–	68
(United States)	Adam Long*	719	55	CUT	65	T65	69	–	–	69
(United States)	Joel Dahmen	716	56	T67	63	T24	55	–	–	55
(South Korea)	An Byeong-hun	710	57	T38	61	T28	53	–	–	53
(United States)	Keegan Bradley	700	58	T64	66	T43	66	–	–	66
(Spain)	Rafa Cabrera-Bello	696	59	DNP	67	T63	70	–	–	70
(England)	Ian Poulter	690	60	T10	43	T31	41	–	–	41
(United States)	Ryan Moore	690	61	T18	49	T37	48	–	–	48
(Argentina)	Emiliano Grillo	673	62	CUT	69	T31	65	–	–	65
(United States)	Vaughn Taylor	641	63	T30	62	T16	49	–	–	49
(United States)	Cameron Champ*	639	64	T21	58	T65	62	–	–	62
(Spain)	Sergio García	637	65	CUT	72	–	–	–	–	72
(New Zealand)	Danny Lee	625	66	81	73	–	–	–	–	73
(Mexico)	Abraham Ancer	622	67	2	8	T28	10	−4	+1	T21
(United States)	Kevin Streelman	609	68	CUT	75	–	–	–	–	75
(United States)	Jordan Spieth	605	69	T6	44	T37	44	–	–	44
(United States)	Matthew Wolff*	602	70	T71	74	–	–	–	–	74
(United States)	Bubba Watson	572	71	CUT	81	–	–	–	–	81
(United States)	Troy Merritt	569	72	T12	59	T43	58	–	–	58
(United States)	Charley Hoffman	567	73	T77	78	–	–	–	–	78
(Chile)	Joaquín Niemann*	566	74	T30	70	T31	67	–	–	67
(United States)	Matt Every	561	75	CUT	86	–	–	–	–	86
(Thailand)	Kiradech Aphibarnrat*	558	76	T71	83	–	–	–	–	83
(England)	Tyrrell Hatton	555	77	T59	79	–	–	–	–	79
(United States)	Brian Stuard	547	78	T52	82	–	–	–	–	82
(Australia)	Cameron Smith	547	79	T59	84	–	–	–	–	84
(Venezuela)	Jhonattan Vegas	538	80	T38	76	–	–	–	–	76
(United States)	Russell Henley	534	81	T59	87	–	–	–	–	87
(United States)	Chesson Hadley	532	82	T43	80	–	–	–	–	80
(United States)	Michael Thompson	527	83	CUT	89	–	–	–	–	89
(United States)	Adam Schenk*	524	84	T24	71	–	–	–	–	71
(Sweden)	Henrik Stenson	523	85	DNP	90	–	–	–	–	90
(United States)	Brian Harman	509	86	T52	88	–	–	–	–	88
(United States)	Luke List	497	87	T77	92	–	–	–	–	92
(South Africa)	Branden Grace	495	88	T30	77	–	–	–	–	77
(United States)	Sam Burns*	493	89	DNP	94	–	–	–	–	94
(United States)	Wyndham Clark*	491	90	T18	68	T31	64	–	–	64
(Canada)	Roger Sloan*	489	91	T64	93	–	–	–	–	93
(United States)	Bud Cauley	482	92	WD	95	–	–	–	–	95
(United States)	J. J. Spaun	479	93	CUT	99	–	–	–	–	99
(United States)	Chris Stroud	473	94	WD	102	–	–	–	–	102
(United States)	Brice Garnett	466	95	CUT	104	–	–	–	–	104
(Canada)	Mackenzie Hughes	466	96	T67	98	–	–	–	–	98
(United States)	Talor Gooch*	463	97	T71	101	–	–	–	–	101
(United States)	Kyle Stanley	460	98	T71	103	–	–	–	–	103
(United States)	Nick Watney	460	99	T59	97	–	–	–	–	97
(United States)	Patrick Rodgers	459	100	CUT	105	–	–	–	–	105
(United States)	Cameron Tringale	459	101	CUT	106	–	–	–	–	106
(United States)	Harold Varner III	458	102	T3	29	68	38	–	–	38
(United States)	Sam Ryder	458	103	CUT	107	–	–	–	–	107
(South Korea)	Lee Kyoung-hoon*	453	104	CUT	108	–	–	–	–	108
(United States)	Scott Stallings	452	105	CUT	109	–	–	–	–	109
(Scotland)	Russell Knox	452	106	CUT	110	–	–	–	–	110
(United States)	Denny McCarthy*	443	107	CUT	111	–	–	–	–	111
(United States)	Ryan Armour	434	108	T43	100	–	–	–	–	100
(United States)	Scott Brown	433	109	76	112	–	–	–	–	112
(England)	Danny Willett	432	110	T24	85	–	–	–	–	85
(Austria)	Sepp Straka*	432	111	CUT	115	–	–	–	–	115
(Australia)	Aaron Baddeley	428	112	WD	116	–	–	–	–	116
(Mexico)	Carlos Ortiz	428	113	T67	113	–	–	–	–	113
(United States)	Peter Malnati	423	114	CUT	118	–	–	–	–	118
(Australia)	Matt Jones	423	115	T30	91	–	–	–	–	91
(United States)	Brian Gay	415	116	CUT	119	–	–	–	–	119
(Canada)	Nick Taylor	408	117	CUT	120	–	–	–	–	120
(United States)	Patton Kizzire	406	118	CUT	122	–	–	–	–	122
(Scotland)	Martin Laird	401	119	83	121	–	–	–	–	121
(United States)	Aaron Wise	400	120	T43	114	–	–	–	–	114
(United States)	Kelly Kraft	399	121	CUT	123	–	–	–	–	123
(Sweden)	Jonas Blixt	392	122	CUT	124	–	–	–	–	124
(United States)	Andrew Landry	388	123	T30	96	–	–	–	–	96
(Colombia)	Sebastián Muñoz*	383	124	T43	117	–	–	–	–	117
(United States)	Pat Perez	376	125	CUT	125	–	–	–	–	125

* First-time Playoffs qualifier
