= Club de Golf Chapultepec =

Golf club in Naucalpan, Mexico

Coordinates: 19.431°N 99.244°W

- Interactive map of Club de Golf Chapultepec

Club information
- Location: Naucalpan, Mexico
- Established: 1921
- Tournaments: Mexican Open (18 times); WGC-Mexico Championship (4 times)
- Designed by: Willie Smith; Alex Smith; Percy Clifford (1972 redesign)
- Par: 71
- Length: 7,345 yards (6,716 m)

Club de Golf Chapultepec is a golf club in Naucalpan, just outside Mexico City, Mexico. It has hosted the Mexican Open multiple times, and has hosted the WGC-Mexico Championship 4 times between 2017 and 2020.

== Description ==
A tree-lined parkland course with tight fairways and undulating terrain, it is built approximately 1.36 miles (more than 7,800 feet) above sea level, which results in much longer ball flights.

== History ==
In 1904 Scotsman and former U.S. Open winner Willie Smith moved to the Country Club of Mexico City to become a club professional. He was tasked with designing a new course, however he died before it could be completed. His brother and two-time U.S. Open winner, Alex Smith, completed the course in 1921. The course was renovated by Percy Clifford in 1972.

== Scorecard ==
Hole	1	2	3	4	5	6	7	8	9	Out	10	11	12	13	14	15	16	17	18	In	Total
Yards	316	387	186	506	445	625	235	525	382	3,607	450	622	406	225	497	575	403	172	388	3,738	7,345
Meters	289	354	170	463	407	572	215	480	349	3,299	411	569	371	206	441	526	369	157	355	3,405	6,704
Par	4	4	3	4	4	5	3	4	4	35	4	5	4	3	4	5	4	3	4	36	71

=== Difficulty ===
Below shows how each hole played to par in editions of the WGC-Mexico Championship held at the course.

Hardest three holes
Easiest three holes

Hole	1	2	3	4	5	6	7	8	9	Out	10	11	12	13	14	15	16	17	18	In	Total
Par	4	4	3	4	4	5	3	4	4	35	4	5	4	3	4	5	4	3	4	36	71
2017	−0.28	−0.08	+0.04	+0.11	+0.14	−0.04	+0.23	+0.36	−0.01	+0.47	+0.12	−0.32	−0.02	+0.16	+0.10	−0.51	+0.02	+0.07	−0.03	−0.42	+0.05
2018	−0.36	−0.13	+0.06	+0.05	+0.04	−0.27	+0.26	+0.28	−0.10	−0.17	+0.11	−0.23	−0.09	+0.14	+0.07	−0.59	+0.04	+0.09	−0.04	−0.48	−0.65
2019	−0.31	−0.25	+0.04	+0.14	+0.08	−0.08	+0.28	+0.33	−0.03	+0.27	+0.08	−0.31	−0.15	+0.14	+0.11	−0.34	+0.03	+0.05	−0.01	−0.41	−0.14
2020	−0.34	−0.29	+0.07	+0.05	+0.02	−0.19	+0.30	+0.31	−0.04	−0.11	+0.14	−0.34	−0.07	+0.19	+0.13	−0.55	+0.09	+0.03	−0.02	−0.39	−0.50
