= Patrick Reed =

American professional golfer (born 1990)

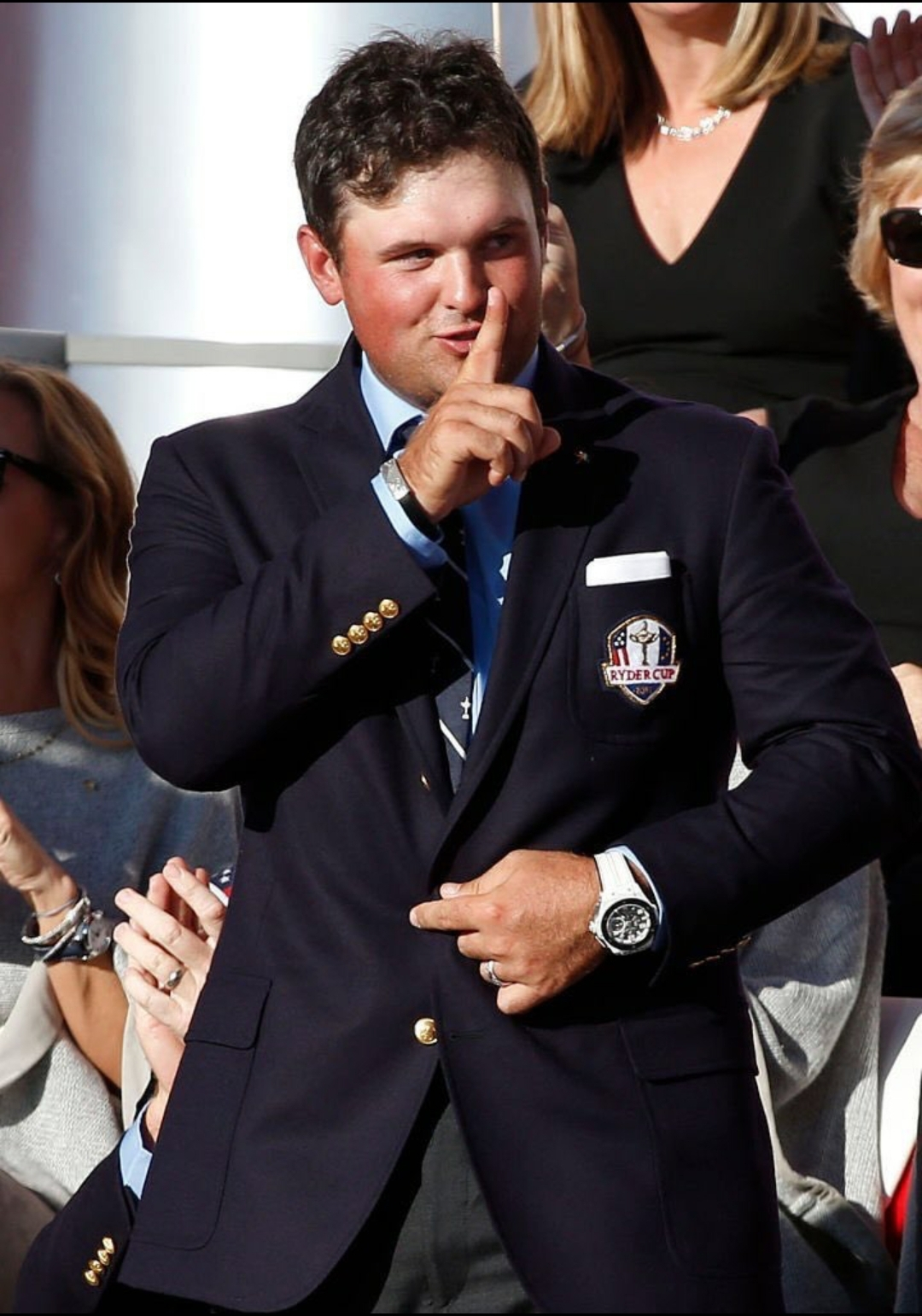
- Reed at the 2018 Ryder Cup

Personal information
- Full name: Patrick Nathaniel Reed
- Nickname: Captain America
- Nationality: United States
- Born: August 5, 1990 (age 36) San Antonio, Texas, U.S.
- Height: 6 ft 0 in (1.83 m)
- Weight: 200 lb (91 kg; 14 st)
- Spouse: Justine Karain Reed (m. 2012)
- Children: 2

Career
- Sport: Golf
- College: University of Georgia; Augusta State University
- Turned professional: 2011
- Current tours: PGA Tour; European Tour
- Former tour: LIV Golf
- Professional wins: 13
- Highest ranking: 6 (June 14, 2020) (as of November 15, 2026)

Number of wins by tour
- PGA Tour: 9
- European Tour: 5
- Asian Tour: 1
- LIV Golf: 1

Best results in major championships (wins: 1)
- Masters Tournament: Won: 2018
- PGA Championship: T2: 2017
- U.S. Open: 4th: 2018
- The Open Championship: 10th: 2019

Patrick Nathaniel Reed (born August 5, 1990) is an American professional golfer. He has nine tournament victories on the PGA Tour, including one major championship, the 2018 Masters Tournament, and two World Golf Championships, the 2014 WGC-Cadillac Championship and 2020 WGC-Mexico Championship. In 2022, he joined LIV Golf.

Reed has represented the United States in Ryder Cup and Presidents Cup team competitions. Through his performances in the Ryder Cup, he has acquired the nickname "Captain America".

== Early life ==
Reed was born in 1990 in San Antonio, Texas. He graduated from University High School in Baton Rouge, Louisiana. While there, he won the 2006 Junior Open Championship and also qualified for the U.S. Amateur in 2007. Reed led University High to state championships in 2006 and 2007, and also won the state medalist honors in 2007. He earned Rolex AJGA All-America honors in 2005, 2006, and 2007.

== Amateur career ==
In 2008, Reed started his college golf career at the University of Georgia in Athens. While at Georgia, Reed had an arrest for underage drinking and possessing a fake ID. He pleaded guilty to the misdemeanor and was put on probation, fined and sentenced to 60 hours of community service. After further issues, including allegations of theft and cheating, he was dismissed from the team. He then left Georgia and enrolled at Augusta State University, where he majored in business. He helped lead Augusta State to NCAA Division I titles in 2010 and 2011. Reed advanced to the semi-finals of the 2008 U.S. Amateur, where he lost 3&2 to eventual U.S. Amateur champion Danny Lee – the top-ranked amateur in the world. He won the 2010 Jones Cup Invitational.

== Professional career ==
=== Early career ===
In 2011, at the age of 20, Reed turned professional after the NCAA Championship. In June of that year, he played in his first PGA Tour event, the FedEx St. Jude Classic, where he missed the cut. Reed played two more events in 2011, earning just over $20,000. He played two events on the Nationwide Tour and earned just over $5,000.

Reed played in 12 events on the PGA Tour on sponsors exemptions and through Monday qualifying (six times). He made seven cuts and earned over $300,000. His best finish was T-11 at the Frys.com Open. He finished T-22 at the PGA Tour Qualifying Tournament, after entering at the First Stage, to earn his PGA Tour card for 2013.

=== PGA Tour ===
Reed picked up his first top-10 finish at the 2013 AT&T Pebble Beach National Pro-Am. On August 18, Reed became the 12th first-time PGA Tour winner of the year with his victory at the Wyndham Championship in a playoff against Jordan Spieth. His win at Sedgefield Country Club also marked his third consecutive top-10 finish.

At the 2014 Humana Challenge, Reed set the PGA Tour record for most strokes under par after 54 holes. His rounds of 63-63-63, were 27-under-par. The tournament's first three rounds are played on three different courses. The previous record was 25-under-par, set by Gay Brewer at the 1967 Pensacola Open and tied by Ernie Els at the 2003 Mercedes Championships, Pat Perez at the 2009 Bob Hope Classic (the previous name of the Humana event) and Steve Stricker at the 2010 John Deere Classic. All four other players won those tournaments. It was also the first time in PGA Tour history that a player opened a tournament with three rounds of 63 or better. Reed won the tournament by two strokes over Ryan Palmer.

On March 9, Reed won the WGC-Cadillac Championship at Trump National Doral in Miami, Florida. He earned $1.53 million with the one-shot win over Bubba Watson and Jamie Donaldson. Reed became only the fifth golfer to earn three PGA Tour wins before his 24th birthday since 1990, joining Tiger Woods, Phil Mickelson, Rory McIlroy and Sergio García. Jordan Spieth subsequently achieved that feat. Reed is the youngest winner of a WGC event, and the victory also moved him to 20th in the Official World Golf Ranking. Reed was also the first PGA Tour golfer to have three wins before playing in his first major, the 2014 Masters.

Also in 2014, Reed finished 5th at the Volvo World Match Play Championship.

On January 12, Reed won his fourth PGA Tour title at the Hyundai Tournament of Champions by defeating Jimmy Walker in a sudden death playoff. He became just the fourth player in the last two decades to win four times on the PGA Tour before his 25th birthday, the other three were Tiger Woods, Rory McIlroy, and Sergio García. The win moved Reed to a career-best OWGR ranking of 14th. Also, he finished second at the Valspar Championship, third at the Hero World Challenge, and seventh at the Honda Classic. Reed also joined the European Tour for the 2015 season.

On August 28, Reed won the first FedEx Cup playoff event, The Barclays played at Bethpage Black. This was his fifth victory on the PGA Tour and first FedEx Cup event win. He went into the final round in the last grouping, one stroke behind the leader Rickie Fowler. He carded a final round of one-under-par to take a one stroke victory over Emiliano Grillo and Sean O'Hair. The win vaulted Reed to the top of the FedEx Cup standings from 7th position ahead of Jason Day. He also automatically qualified for the Ryder Cup team with this victory.

After the second FedEx Cup playoff event, the Deutsche Bank Championship, Reed extended his lead to 556 points over Day, with a top-10 finish. He finished third in the final FedEx Cup standings behind Dustin Johnson and FedEx Cup champion Rory McIlroy.

On the final day of the PGA Championship, Reed had three birdies on the back to get to within a shot of the lead, but bogeyed the 18th after finding a fairway bunker off the tee and tied for second, two strokes behind winner Justin Thomas.

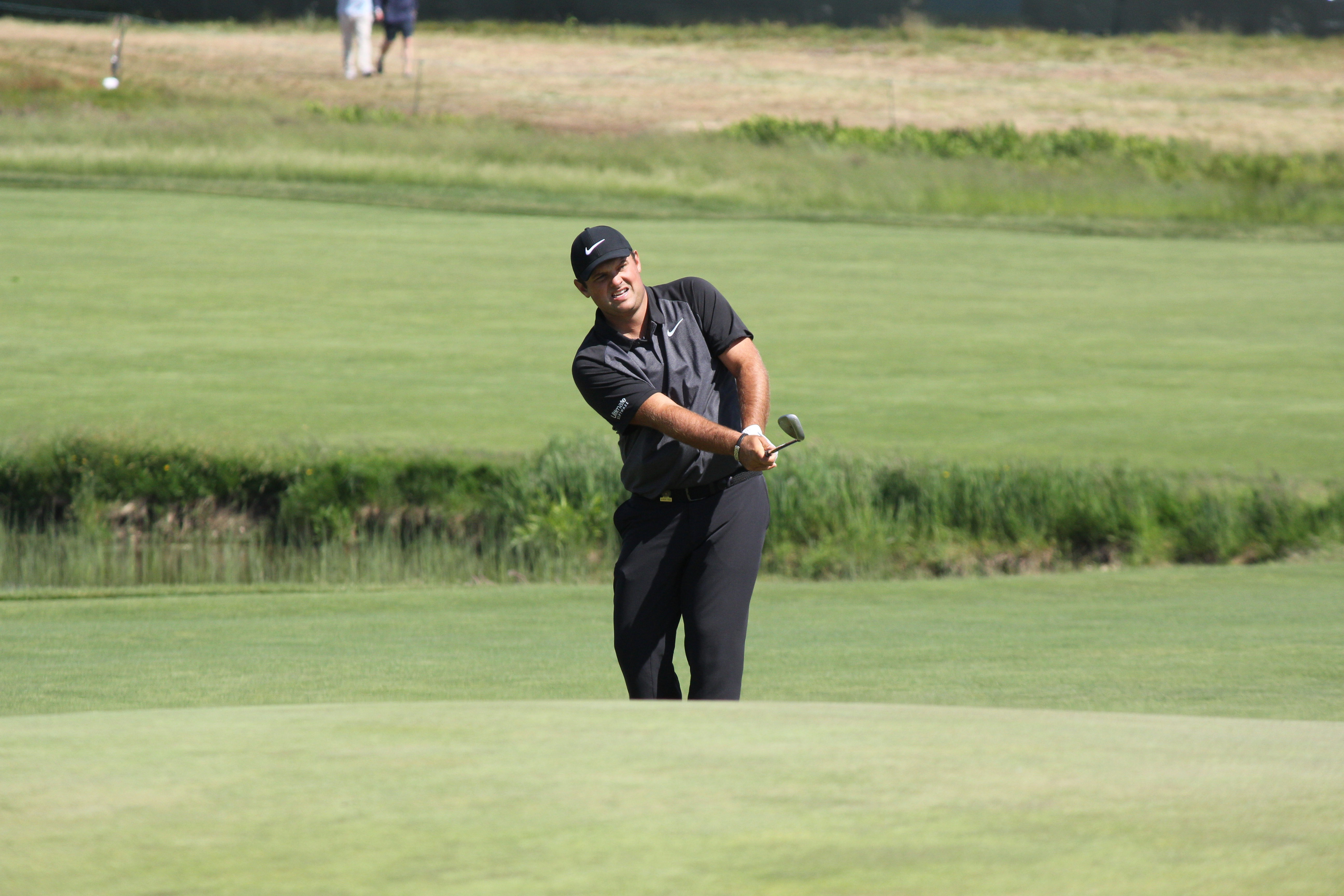
Reed chipping

Reed shot 69–66 to lead the 2018 Masters Tournament by two strokes after two rounds. He followed up that performance with two eagles on the back nine for a 67 on Saturday. Entering the final round, he led the Masters by three strokes over Rory McIlroy. On Sunday April 8, 2018, McIlroy faltered and Reed fought off the final round comeback bids of Jordan Spieth and Rickie Fowler to win the green jacket, shooting 71 (−1) for a tournament total of 273 (−15). Reed moved up to No. 11 in the world rankings and collected a paycheck of $1.98 million.

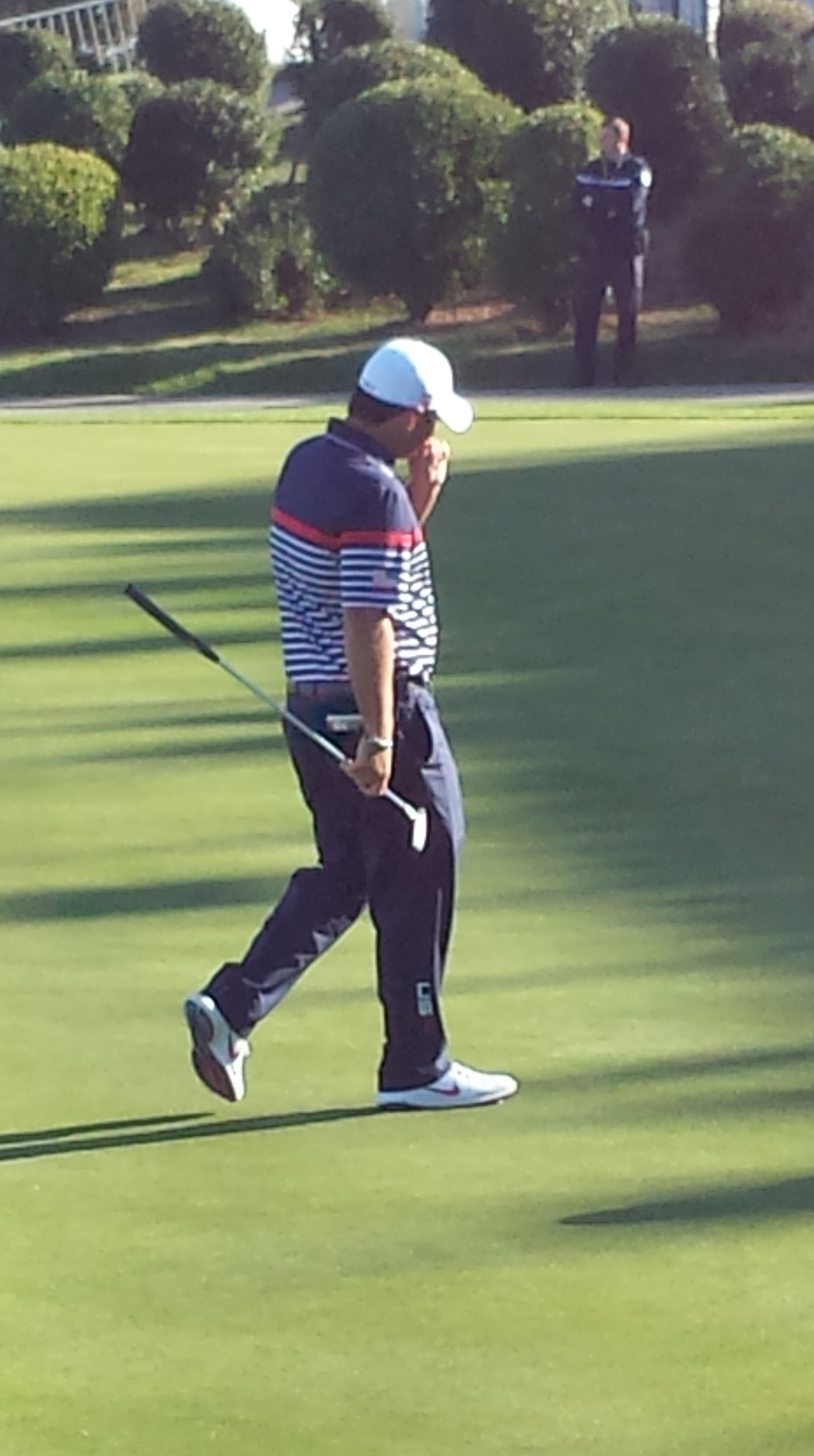
Patrick Reed practicing putting at the 2018 Ryder Cup at Le Golf National outside Paris, France

In September 2018, Reed qualified for the U.S. team participating in the 2018 Ryder Cup. Europe beat the U.S. team 17 1/2 points to 10 1/2 points at Le Golf National outside of Paris, France. Reed finished 1–2–0. He lost two fourball matches with Tiger Woods but won his singles match against Tyrrell Hatton.

After the event, Reed was enveloped in controversy. Late on Sunday September 30, 2018, Karen Crouse of The New York Times published an article with quotes from Reed. In the article, Reed questioned Jordan Spieth and U.S. captain Jim Furyk about the breakup of the previously successful Reed-Spieth Ryder Cup pairing. Reed was quoted as saying "The issue's obviously with Jordan not wanting to play with me . . . I don't have any issue with Jordan. When it comes right down to it, I don't care if I like the person I'm paired with or if the person likes me as long as it works and it sets up the team for success." Reed also described the Ryder Cup pairing decision-making process as "a buddy system" that ignores the input of all but a few select players. Reed also made it clear to Crouse that he lobbied Furyk to keep playing with Spieth, his "first choice." He expected it and was blindsided when he found out Spieth was playing with Justin Thomas.

Reed told Crouse "For somebody as successful in the Ryder Cup as I am, I don't think it's smart to sit me twice." Reed implied that Tiger Woods was his "second choice". He told Crouse that after he and Woods lost their first match against Tommy Fleetwood and Francesco Molinari, Woods apologized to Reed for letting him down. Reed said he told Woods, "We win together as a team and we lose together as a team." Reed told Crouse that "very day [in the team room], I saw 'Leave your egos at the door,'". Referring to the Europeans, he added, "They do that better than us." There has been concern expressed that Reed's public flaming of his teammates and captain will negatively impact on his ability to play on future Ryder Cup and President Cup teams.

In August 2019, Reed won the Northern Trust at Liberty National Golf Club near New York City. This was the first leg of the 2019 FedEx Cup Playoffs.

In February 2020, Reed won his second World Golf Championship when he won the WGC-Mexico Championship at the Club de Golf Chapultepec. Reed shot a final round 4-under 67 to win by one shot over Bryson DeChambeau.

In January, Reed won the Farmers Insurance Open at Torrey Pines Golf Course in La Jolla, California. Reed won by five strokes after a final round 4-under 68.

In August, Reed was admitted to hospital having been diagnosed with bilateral pneumonia which forced him to miss the first two FedEx Cup Playoff events. He returned to action in early September at the Tour Championship in the hope that by proving his fitness he might gain a captain's pick for the Ryder Cup; he finished the tournament in 25th place. When the 12-man USA team was announced by Steve Stricker the following week, Reed, who had finished 11th in the points standings, was not selected.

=== LIV Golf ===
On June 11, 2022, it was announced that Reed had joined LIV Golf. On June 29, it was confirmed that he had resigned from the PGA Tour.

=== Return to PGA Tour ===
In January 2026, Reed announced plans to leave LIV Golf and return to the PGA Tour. At the time, Reed was ranked 29th in the Official World Golf Ranking. He is eligible to return on August 25, 2026. For 2027, Reed's nine tour victories earned him past champion status on the PGA Tour and for the fall of 2026 the possibility of sponsors' invitations or Monday qualifiers.

After leaving LIV Golf, Reed played on the European Tour, now named DP World Tour, as an Honorary Lifetime Member. He achieved immediate success with two wins and a playoff loss before the end of February 2026, lifting him to the top of the Race to Dubai rankings.

== Controversies ==
Reed has been at the center of multiple rules incidents, dating back to his days in college golf at UGA and Augusta State, claims Reed has vociferously denied.

Reed was heavily scrutinized for an infraction committed at the 2019 Hero World Challenge, where Reed, then leading the tournament, twice moved sand behind his ball in a waste area, seemingly improving his lie, to which Reed responded that he had not noticed the movement and cited his angle compared to that of the camera's for his lack of realization. Reed ended up being penalized two strokes for improving his lie. He received heavy criticism for his actions and initial response, from players and commentators alike.

In January 2021, during the third round of the Farmers Insurance Open, Reed obtained a free relief for an embedded ball in the rough on the tenth hole. As none of Reed, his playing partners, or the volunteers in the area had seen the ball bounce, Reed had marked and picked up his ball to check the lie before a rules official arrived, and the official confirmed his entitlement to relief. Video showed that the ball had bounced once in the rough before coming to rest, leading some to question whether it could truly have been embedded. Despite the apparent controversy, tour officials later confirmed that Reed had followed the correct procedure per the rules of golf.

In August 2022, it was reported that a defamation lawsuit had been filed on Reed's behalf, alleging that Brandel Chamblee and his employers, Golf Channel, had "conspired... for and with the PGA Tour" to defame Reed by intentionally misreporting through omission and falsification of various facts, resulting in harm to his reputation and causing him to experience abuse. In September, the lawsuit was refiled in Jacksonville, Florida having originally been filed in Texas. It was also amended to include Golfweek and several other golf writers as additional defendants. In September 2023, the lawsuit was dismissed again in federal court. The court said Reed failed to bring any actionable defamation claims in his lawsuits. In January 2024, the court concluded Reed filed the lawsuit to stifle free speech, and ordered him to pay the defendants' legal fees and costs.

In January 2023, Reed was involved in a controversial ruling at the Hero Dubai Desert Classic. On the 17th hole at the Emirates Golf Club, he hit his tee shot into a palm tree, where it became stuck. Reed was 100% certain that the ball identified was his, however TV replays suggested that his tee shot had finished in a different tree. Reed responded to the criticism, citing it as a "non-issue".

== Personal life ==
Reed married Justine Karain on December 21, 2012. She was his caddie for the qualifying rounds in La Quinta, California, where Reed secured a PGA Tour card at Q-School, and during his first two years on tour.

Since Justine's pregnancies and the birth of daughter Windsor-Wells and son Barrett Benjamin Reed, her brother, Kessler Karain, has served as Reed's caddie.

Reed has not spoken to his parents Bill and Jeannette Reed or his younger sister Hannah since he married Justine in 2012. Reed did not invite his parents or his sister to his wedding and only considers Justine's family close. Reed's family has continued to attend tournaments where he played, even after Reed asked security to escort them out of the 2014 U.S. Open.

== Professional wins (13) ==
=== PGA Tour wins (9) ===
Legend
Major championships (1)
World Golf Championships (2)
FedEx Cup playoff events (2)
Other PGA Tour (4)

No.	Date	Tournament	Winning score	To par	Margin of victory	Runner(s)-up
1	Aug 18, 2013	Wyndham Championship	65-64-71-66=266	−14	Playoff	(United States) Jordan Spieth
2	Jan 19, 2014	Humana Challenge	63-63-63-71=260	−28	2 strokes	(United States) Ryan Palmer
3	Mar 9, 2014	WGC-Cadillac Championship	68-75-69-72=284	−4	1 stroke	(Wales) Jamie Donaldson, (United States) Bubba Watson
4	Jan 12, 2015	Hyundai Tournament of Champions	67-69-68-67=271	−21	Playoff	(United States) Jimmy Walker
5	Aug 28, 2016	The Barclays	66-68-71-70=275	−9	1 stroke	(Argentina) Emiliano Grillo, (United States) Sean O'Hair
6	Apr 8, 2018	Masters Tournament	69-66-67-71=273	−15	1 stroke	(United States) Rickie Fowler
7	Aug 11, 2019	The Northern Trust (2)	66-66-67-69=268	−16	1 stroke	(Mexico) Abraham Ancer
8	Feb 23, 2020	WGC-Mexico Championship (2)	69-63-67-67=266	−18	1 stroke	(United States) Bryson DeChambeau
9	Jan 31, 2021	Farmers Insurance Open	64-72-70-68=274	−14	5 strokes	(United States) Tony Finau, (Norway) Viktor Hovland, (Sweden) Henrik Norlander, (United States) Ryan Palmer, (United States) Xander Schauffele

PGA Tour playoff record (2–2)

No.	Year	Tournament	Opponent(s)	Result
1	2013	Wyndham Championship	(United States) Jordan Spieth	Won with birdie on second extra hole
2	2015	Hyundai Tournament of Champions	(United States) Jimmy Walker	Won with birdie on first extra hole
3	2015	Valspar Championship	(United States) Sean O'Hair, (United States) Jordan Spieth	Spieth won with birdie on third extra hole
4	2020	Sentry Tournament of Champions	(United States) Xander Schauffele, (United States) Justin Thomas	Thomas won with birdie on third extra hole Schauffele eliminated by birdie on first hole

=== European Tour wins (5) ===
Legend
Major championships (1)
World Golf Championships (2)
Rolex Series (1)
Other European Tour (1)

No.	Date	Tournament	Winning score	To par	Margin of victory	Runner(s)-up
1	Mar 9, 2014	WGC-Cadillac Championship	68-75-69-72=284	−4	1 stroke	(Wales) Jamie Donaldson, (United States) Bubba Watson
2	Apr 8, 2018	Masters Tournament	69-66-67-71=273	−15	1 stroke	(United States) Rickie Fowler
3	Feb 23, 2020	WGC-Mexico Championship (2)	69-63-67-67=266	−18	1 stroke	(United States) Bryson DeChambeau
4	Jan 25, 2026	Hero Dubai Desert Classic	69-66-67-72=274	−14	4 strokes	(England) Andy Sullivan
5	Feb 8, 2026	Qatar Masters	65-67-70-70=272	−16	2 strokes	(Scotland) Calum Hill

European Tour playoff record (0–2)

No.	Year	Tournament	Opponent(s)	Result
1	2015	BMW Masters	(Sweden) Kristoffer Broberg	Lost to birdie on first extra hole
2	2026	Bapco Energies Bahrain Championship	(Scotland) Calum Hill, (Germany) Freddy Schott	Schott won with par on second extra hole Reed eliminated by par on first hole

=== Asian Tour wins (1) ===
Legend
International Series (1)
Other Asian Tour (0)

No.	Date	Tournament	Winning score	To par	Margin of victory	Runner-up
1	Nov 24, 2024	Link Hong Kong Open	65-68-59-66=258	−22	3 strokes	(New Zealand) Ben Campbell

=== LIV Golf League wins (1) ===
No.	Date	Tournament	Winning score	Margin of victory	Runners-up
1	Jun 29, 2025	LIV Golf Dallas	−6 (67-68-75=210)	Playoff	(England) Paul Casey, (Japan) Jinichiro Kozuma, (South Africa) Louis Oosthuizen

LIV Golf League playoff record (1–0)

No.	Year	Tournament	Opponents	Result
1	2025	LIV Golf Dallas	(England) Paul Casey, (Japan) Jinichiro Kozuma, (South Africa) Louis Oosthuizen	Won with birdie on first extra hole

== Major championships ==
=== Wins (1) ===
Year	Championship	54 holes	Winning score	Margin	Runner-up
2018	Masters Tournament	3 shot lead	−15 (69-66-67-71=273)	1 stroke	(United States) Rickie Fowler

=== Results timeline ===
Results not in chronological order in 2020.

Tournament	2014	2015	2016	2017	2018
Masters Tournament	CUT	T22	T49	CUT	1
U.S. Open	T35	T14	CUT	T13	4
The Open Championship	CUT	T20	T12	CUT	T28
PGA Championship	T58	T30	T13	T2	CUT

Tournament	2019	2020	2021	2022	2023	2024	2025	2026
Masters Tournament	T36	T10	T8	T35	T4	T12	3	T12
PGA Championship	CUT	T13	T17	T34	T18	T53	CUT	T10
U.S. Open	T32	T13	T19	T49	T56		T23	CUT
The Open Championship	10	NT	CUT	T47	T33		CUT	T46

Win
Top 10

CUT = missed the half-way cut
"T" indicates a tie for a place
NT = no tournament due to COVID-19 pandemic

=== Summary ===
Tournament	Wins	2nd	3rd	Top-5	Top-10	Top-25	Events	Cuts made
Masters Tournament	1	0	1	3	5	8	13	11
PGA Championship	0	1	0	1	2	6	13	10
U.S. Open	0	0	0	1	1	6	12	10
The Open Championship	0	0	0	0	1	3	11	7
Totals	1	1	1	5	9	23	49	38

- Most consecutive cuts made – 11 (2022 Masters – 2025 Masters)
- Longest streak of top-10s – 3 (2017 PGA – 2018 U.S. Open)

== Results in The Players Championship ==
Tournament	2014	2015	2016	2017	2018	2019	2020	2021	2022
The Players Championship	CUT	T24	CUT	T22	T41	T47	C	T22	T26

CUT = missed the half-way cut
"T" indicates a tie for a place
C = Canceled after the first round due to the COVID-19 pandemic

== World Golf Championships ==
=== Wins (2) ===
Year	Championship	54 holes	Winning score	Margin	Runner(s)-up
2014	WGC-Cadillac Championship	2 shot lead	−4 (68-75-69-72=284)	1 stroke	(Wales) Jamie Donaldson, (United States) Bubba Watson
2020	WGC-Mexico Championship (2)	1 shot deficit	−18 (69-63-67-67=266)	1 stroke	(United States) Bryson DeChambeau

=== Results timeline ===
Results not in chronological order before 2015.

Tournament	2014	2015	2016	2017	2018	2019	2020	2021	2022
Championship	1	T23	T52	T61	T37	T14	1	T9	
Match Play	R32	T17	R16	T51	R16	T24	NT^{1}	T28	T26
Invitational	T4	T15	52	T36	T28	T12	T47	T31	
Champions	T22	T7	T60	T50	T7	T8	NT^{1}	NT^{1}	NT^{1}

^{1}Cancelled due to COVID-19 pandemic

Win
Top 10
Did not play

QF, R16, R32, R64 = Round in which player lost in match play
NT = no tournament
"T" = tied
Note that the Championship and Invitational were discontinued from 2022.

== U.S. national team appearances ==
Professional

- Ryder Cup: 2014, 2016 (winners), 2018
- Presidents Cup: 2015 (winners), 2017 (winners), 2019 (winners)

Ryder Cup points record
2014	2016	2018	Total
3.5	3.5	1	8

== See also ==
- 2012 PGA Tour Qualifying School graduates
- 2026 Race to Dubai dual card winners
- Lowest rounds of golf
