= 2007 FedEx Cup Playoffs =

Tournament information
- Dates: August 23 – September 16, 2007
- Location: Westchester Country Club; TPC Boston; Cog Hill Golf & Country Club; East Lake Golf Club
- Tour: PGA Tour

Statistics
- Field: 144 for The Barclays; 120 for Deutsche Bank; 70 for BMW Championship; 30 for Tour Championship
- Prize fund: $35,000,000 bonus money
- Winner's share: $10,000,000 bonus money

Champion
- (United States) Tiger Woods
- 123,033 points

The 2007 FedEx Cup Playoffs were held from August 23 to September 16. They consisted of four events. The events in order are The Barclays, Deutsche Bank Championship, BMW Championship and The Tour Championship. These were the first FedEx Cup playoffs being held. Tiger Woods won the playoffs and took home $10,000,000.

The point distribution can be seen here.

== Regular season rankings ==
Place	Player	Points	Events	Reset Points
1	(United States) Tiger Woods	30,574	13	100,000
2	(Fiji) Vijay Singh	19,129	23	99,000
3	(United States) Jim Furyk	16,691	19	98,500
4	(United States) Phil Mickelson	16,037	18	98,000
5	(South Korea) K. J. Choi	15,485	21	97,500
6	(South Africa) Rory Sabbatini	13,548	19	97,250
7	(United States) Zach Johnson	13,341	19	97,000
8	(United States) Charles Howell III	12,126	21	96,750
9	(United States) Brandt Snedeker	11,870	25	96,500
10	(Australia) Adam Scott	11,196	15	96,250

For the full list see here

== The Barclays ==
The Barclays was played August 23–26. 144 players were eligible to play but 6 of them did not enter. Of the 138 players who entered the tournament, 75 of them made the cut. The cut was even par. Steve Stricker won by shooting −16 to win the first ever FedEx Cup playoff event. Tiger Woods did not participate in the tournament. The top 120 players in the points standings advanced to the Deutsche Bank Championship.

Place	Player	Score	To par	Points	Winnings ($)
1	(United States) Steve Stricker	67-67-65-69=268	−16	9,000	1,260,000
2	(South Korea) K. J. Choi	64-66-70-70=270	−14	5,400	756,000
3	(South Africa) Rory Sabbatini	63-71-69-68=271	−13	3,400	476,000
T4	(United States) Mark Calcavecchia	67-75-65-65=272	−12	2,067	289,333
T4	(South Africa) Ernie Els	65-71-68-68=272	−12	2,067	289,333
T4	(Australia) Geoff Ogilvy	68-66-69-69=272	−12	2,067	289,333
T7	(United States) Rich Beem	64-68-69-72=273	−11	1,613	225,750
T7	(United States) Phil Mickelson	67-70-69-67=273	−11	1,613	225,750
T9	(United States) Robert Garrigus	70-70-68-66=274	−10	1,350	189,000
T9	(United States) Jerry Kelly	67-70-69-68=274	−10	1,350	189,000
T9	(England) Ian Poulter	70-67-70-67=274	−10	1,350	189,000

Full leaderboard

== Deutsche Bank Championship ==
The Deutsche Bank Championship was played from August 31 to September 3. 120 players were eligible to play but 4 of them did not enter. Of the 116 players who entered the tournament, 75 of them made the cut. The cut was 1 over-par. Phil Mickelson won by shooting −16. Tiger Woods finished tied for 2nd, two strokes behind Mickelson. The top 70 players in the points standings advanced to the BMW Championship.

Place	Player	Score	To par	Points	Winnings ($)
1	(United States) Phil Mickelson	70-64-68-66=268	−16	9,000	1,260,000
T2	(United States) Arron Oberholser	69-66-66-69=270	−14	3,733	522,667
T2	(United States) Brett Wetterich	66-68-66-70=270	−14	3,733	522,667
T2	(United States) Tiger Woods	72-64-67-67=270	−14	3,733	522,667
5	(Australia) Aaron Baddeley	67-66-70-70=273	−11	2,000	280,000
T6	(Australia) Geoff Ogilvy	70-70-67-67=274	−10	1,738	243,250
T6	(South Africa) Rory Sabbatini	68-67-70-69=274	−10	1,738	243,250
8	(Australia) Robert Allenby	69-69-70-67=275	−9	1,550	217,000
T9	(Sweden) Freddie Jacobson	66-72-70-68=276	−8	1,250	175,000
T9	(United States) Troy Matteson	71-66-69-70=276	−8	1,250	175,000
T9	(United States) Sean O'Hair	68-66-74-68=276	−8	1,250	175,000
T9	(United States) Steve Stricker	67-69-69-71=276	−8	1,250	175,000
T9	(Colombia) Camilo Villegas	63-72-69-72=276	−8	1,250	175,000

Full leaderboard

== BMW Championship ==
The BMW Championship was played September 6–9. 70 players were eligible to play but three of them did not enter. There was no cut for this tournament. Tiger Woods won by shooting −22. This was Tiger's 60th win on the PGA Tour. The top 30 players in the points standings advanced to The Tour Championship.

Place	Player	Score	To par	Points	Winnings ($)
1	(United States) Tiger Woods	67-67-65-63=262	−22	9,000	1,260,000
2	(Australia) Aaron Baddeley	68-65-65-66=264	−20	5,400	756,000
3	(United States) Steve Stricker	68-66-64-68=266	−18	3,400	480,000
4	(Australia) Adam Scott	69-69-67-65=270	−14	2,400	340,000
T5	(South Africa) Tim Clark	68-69-67-67=271	−13	1,900	270,000
T5	(England) Justin Rose	65-69-69-68=271	−13	1,900	270,000
T7	(United States) Stewart Cink	66-73-68-65=272	−12	1,613	229,000
T7	(Colombia) Camilo Villegas	65-69-71-67=272	−12	1,613	229,000
9	(Spain) Sergio García	68-70-69-67=274	−10	1,450	206,000
T10	(United States) Jonathan Byrd	64-69-71-71=275	−9	1,200	171,000
T10	(Sweden) Carl Pettersson	71-68-69-67=275	−9	1,200	171,000
T10	(England) Ian Poulter	68-72-69-66=275	−9	1,200	171,000
T10	(South Africa) Rory Sabbatini	69-72-68-66=275	−9	1,200	171,000

Full leaderboard

== The Tour Championship ==
The Tour Championship was played September 13–16. All 30 players eligible to play did so. There was no cut for this tournament. Tiger Woods won by shooting −23. This was Tiger's 61st win on the PGA Tour. He also won the FedEx Cup.

Place	Player	Score	To par	Points	Winnings ($)
1	(United States) Tiger Woods	64-63-64-66=257	−23	10,300	1,260,000
T2	(United States) Zach Johnson	71-66-60-68=265	−15	5,050	619,500
T2	(United States) Mark Calcavecchia	65-66-63-71=265	−15	5,050	619,500
4	(Spain) Sergio García	68-64-64-70=266	−14	2,800	336,000
T5	(United States) Scott Verplank	66-68-67-68=269	−11	2,180	266,000
T5	(United States) Hunter Mahan	65-68-65-71=269	−11	2,180	266,000
T7	(South Africa) Tim Clark	62-69-70-69=270	−10	1,850	231,000
T7	(Fiji) Vijay Singh	68-68-65-69=270	−10	1,850	231,000
T9	(Colombia) Camilo Villegas	67-68-70-66=271	−9	1,605	204,400
T9	(South Africa) Rory Sabbatini	68-68-67-68=271	−9	1,605	204,400

Full leaderboard

== Final leaderboard ==
Place	Player	Points	Winnings ($)
1	(United States) Tiger Woods	123,033	10,000,000
2	(United States) Steve Stricker	110,455	3,000,000
3	(United States) Phil Mickelson	109,357	2,000,000
4	(South Africa) Rory Sabbatini	105,192	1,500,000
5	(South Korea) K. J. Choi	103,765	1,000,000
6	(Australia) Aaron Baddeley	103,350	800,000
7	(United States) Zach Johnson	102,872	700,000
8	(United States) Mark Calcavecchia	102,068	600,000
9	(Spain) Sergio García	101,076	550,000
10	(Fiji) Vijay Singh	101,064	500,000

For the full list see here

== Table of qualifying players ==
Table key:

Win
Top-10 finish
Did not advance to next tournament
Played way into next tournament

	Player	Pre-Playoffs		The Barclays		Deutsche Bank		BMW Champ.		Tour Champ.	
	Player	Rank	Reset points	Finish	Rank after	Finish	Rank after	Finish	Rank after	Finish	Final rank
(United States)	Tiger Woods	1	100,000	DNP	4	T2	3	1	1	1	1
(Fiji)	Vijay Singh	2	99,000	CUT	6	T60	6	64	9	T7	10
(United States)	Jim Furyk	3	98,500	T25	7	T55	7	T14	8	T11	11
(United States)	Phil Mickelson	4	98,000	T7	5	1	1	DNP	3	20	3
(South Korea)	K. J. Choi	5	97,500	2	2	WD	4	T38	5	T21	5
(South Africa)	Rory Sabbatini	6	97,250	3	3	T6	5	T10	4	T9	4
(United States)	Zach Johnson	7	97,000	T25	8	T30	10	T38	12	T2	7
(United States)	Charles Howell III	8	96,750	CUT	12	T30	12	T18	13	28	18
(United States)	Brandt Snedeker	9	96,500	CUT	14	T47	17	T14	15	T29	20
(Australia)	Adam Scott	10	96,250	T14	9	T17	9	4	7	T26	12
(United States)	Scott Verplank	11	96,100	T35	15	DNP	18	T30	19	T5	14
(United States)	Steve Stricker	12	95,950	1	1	T9	2	3	2	T17	2
(Spain)	Sergio García	13	95,800	T25	18	T17	16	9	10	4	9
(United States)	Woody Austin	14	95,650	T12	12	T30	12	T38	17	T11	17
(United States)	Hunter Mahan	15	95,500	T17	16	CUT	19	T30	20	T5	15
(United States)	John Rollins	16	95,350	T54	19	T47	21	56	23	25	26
(United States)	Boo Weekley	17	95,200	T35	20	T41	20	T57	22	T21	25
(Australia)	Aaron Baddeley	18	95,050	T25	21	5	11	2	6	24	6
(South Africa)	Ernie Els	19	94,900	T4	10	DNP	14	T18	14	T26	19
(United States)	Mark Calcavecchia	20	94,750	T4	11	T72	15	65	18	T2	8
(Republic of Ireland)	Pádraig Harrington	21	94,600	T35	23	CUT	25	DNP	30	T11	29
(England)	Justin Rose	22	94,450	T14	22	CUT	23	T5	16	T11	16
(England)	Luke Donald	23	94,300	CUT	25	T60	28	T30	31	–	31
(Australia)	Geoff Ogilvy	24	94,150	T4	17	T6	8	T61	11	T17	13
(United States)	David Toms	25	94,000	CUT	27	WD	31	T18	33	–	33
(United States)	Jonathan Byrd	26	93,850	CUT	29	T23	30	T10	25	23	28
(Australia)	Robert Allenby	27	93,700	CUT	30	8	24	T38	26	T11	23
(United States)	Stewart Cink	28	93,550	T25	28	CUT	32	T7	24	T11	22
(United States)	Heath Slocum	29	93,400	T14	25	T23	26	46	29	T17	30
(Australia)	Stuart Appleby	30	93,250	CUT	32	CUT	36	T25	36	–	36
(Sweden)	Henrik Stenson	31	93,175	CUT	34	T55	35	T52	39	–	39
(United States)	Jerry Kelly	32	93,100	T9	24	T65	27	T49	32	–	32
(United States)	Bubba Watson	33	93,025	CUT	36	CUT	41	T18	37	–	37
(United States)	Ken Duke	34	92,950	CUT	37	T65	40	T52	45	–	45
(United States)	Nick Watney	35	92,875	T25	33	CUT	37	T59	41	–	41
(South Africa)	Tim Clark	36	92,800	T17	31	CUT	33	T5	27	T7	21
(South Africa)	Trevor Immelman	37	92,725	CUT	38	T23	38	T38	40	–	40
(United States)	Mark Wilson	38	92,650	CUT	39	T30	43	T25	42	–	42
(United States)	Pat Perez	39	92,575	CUT	40	WD	46	T18	44	–	44
(United States)	Billy Mayfair	40	92,500	CUT	41	CUT	47	T38	49	–	49
(United States)	Jeff Quinney	41	92,425	CUT	42	CUT	48	63	51	–	51
(United States)	Anthony Kim	42	92,350	T17	35	CUT	39	T52	43	–	43
(Sweden)	Carl Pettersson	43	92,275	T72	43	CUT	49	T10	38	–	38
(Argentina)	Ángel Cabrera	44	92,200	CUT	44	T23	45	T30	47	–	47
(United States)	Lucas Glover	45	92,125	CUT	47	T14	41	T14	35	–	35
(United States)	Charley Hoffman	46	92,050	T48	45	CUT	53	T25	50	–	50
(United States)	Kevin Sutherland	47	91,975	CUT	49	CUT	55	T25	56	–	56
(Australia)	John Senden	48	91,900	CUT	50	T23	50	T52	55	–	55
(Australia)	Rod Pampling	49	91,825	T35	48	T41	51	T38	53	–	53
(United States)	Brett Wetterich	50	91,750	CUT	51	T2	22	T30	21	T29	27
(United States)	Ryan Moore	51	91,675	CUT	52	T41	57	T18	52	–	52
(Colombia)	Camilo Villegas	52	91,600	T21	46	T9	34	T7	28	T9	24
(United States)	Paul Goydos	53	91,525	T48	53	T30	56	DNP	59	–	59
(Australia)	Nathan Green	54	91,450	T69	54	T17	52	T14	46	–	46
(Japan)	Ryuji Imada	55	91,375	CUT	58	T17	54	T25	54	–	54
(United States)	Troy Matteson	56	91,300	T48	57	T9	44	T47	48	–	48
(Australia)	Nick O'Hern	57	91,225	T35	56	CUT	60	T61	62	–	62
(United States)	Kenny Perry	58	91,150	T25	55	T47	59	T47	60	–	60
(Germany)	Bernhard Langer	59	91,075	DNP	59	DNP	63	DNP	68	–	68
(Argentina)	José Cóceres	60	91,000	CUT	62	CUT	65	T59	66	–	66
(United States)	Vaughn Taylor	61	90,925	T60	61	T41	62	T30	63	–	63
(United States)	Brian Bateman	62	90,850	CUT	64	T47	66	T49	67	–	67
(United States)	Steve Marino	63	90,775	T69	63	CUT	67	T49	70	–	70
(Canada)	Stephen Ames	64	90,700	DNP	66	T55	69	T38	69	–	69
(United States)	Rocco Mediate	65	90,625	75	65	T52	68	T30	65	–	65
(Australia)	Peter Lonard	66	90,550	CUT	69	CUT	72	–	–	–	72
(United States)	Bo Van Pelt	67	90,475	CUT	72	T30	70	T18	64	–	64
(United States)	John Mallinger	68	90,400	T72	71	T14	61	T30	61	–	61
(Australia)	Stephen Leaney	69	90,325	WD	73	WD	74	–	–	–	74
(United States)	Sean O'Hair	70	90,250	T25	68	T9	58	T57	58	–	58
(United States)	Will MacKenzie	71	90,175	CUT	74	T30	73	–	–	–	73
(United States)	Arron Oberholser	72	90,100	T21	67	T2	29	WD	34	–	34
(United States)	Fred Funk	73	90,025	T48	75	WD	77	–	–	–	77
(England)	Brian Davis	74	89,950	T54	76	T72	76	–	–	–	76
(United States)	Dean Wilson	75	89,875	T60	77	T30	75	–	–	–	75
(United States)	Brian Gay	76	89,800	T41	78	T70	78	–	–	–	78
(England)	Ian Poulter	77	89,725	T9	59	CUT	63	T10	57	–	57
(United States)	Bart Bryant	78	89,650	T65	80	T41	79	–	–	–	79
(United States)	Joe Ogilvie	79	89,575	CUT	82	T52	82	–	–	–	82
(United States)	Davis Love III	80	89,500	T41	81	CUT	83	–	–	–	83
(United States)	Steve Flesch	81	89,425	T12	70	75	71	–	–	–	71
(United States)	Tim Petrovic	82	89,350	T21	79	CUT	80	–	–	–	80
(United States)	Jason Gore	83	89,275	71	83	T23	81	–	–	–	81
(United States)	Charles Warren	84	89,200	CUT	84	T72	85	–	–	–	85
(United States)	Justin Leonard	85	89,125	CUT	85	T55	86	–	–	–	86
(United States)	Tom Lehman	86	89,050	CUT	87	DNP	90	–	–	–	90
(South Africa)	Retief Goosen	87	88,975	T60	86	CUT	89	–	–	–	89
(United States)	J. J. Henry	88	88,900	CUT	89	CUT	94	–	–	–	94
(United States)	Tom Pernice Jr.	89	88,825	CUT	91	T52	93	–	–	–	93
(Canada)	Mike Weir	90	88,750	T41	88	T30	87	–	–	–	87
(Australia)	Steve Elkington	91	88,675	CUT	93	T23	88	–	–	–	88
(United States)	Matt Kuchar	92	88,600	T35	90	T41	92	–	–	–	92
(United States)	Chris DiMarco	93	88,525	CUT	94	CUT	97	–	–	–	97
(United States)	Shaun Micheel	94	88,450	CUT	95	CUT	99	–	–	–	99
(United States)	Kevin Na	95	88,375	CUT	96	69	98	–	–	–	98
(Spain)	José María Olazábal	96	88,300	DNP	98	DNP	100	–	–	–	100
(Sweden)	Freddie Jacobson	97	88,225	T54	97	T9	84	–	–	–	84
(South Korea)	Charlie Wi	98	88,150	CUT	100	T14	90	–	–	–	90
(United States)	Cliff Kresge	99	88,075	T54	99	T17	95	–	–	–	95
(United States)	Jeff Maggert	100	88,000	T72	101	T65	102	–	–	–	102
(United States)	Craig Kanada	101	87,925	CUT	103	T55	103	–	–	–	103
(United States)	Briny Baird	102	87,850	T41	102	T30	101	–	–	–	101
(United States)	Ted Purdy	103	87,775	CUT	105	CUT	105	–	–	–	105
(United States)	Tim Herron	104	87,700	T48	104	T60	104	–	–	–	104
(United States)	Kevin Stadler	105	87,625	CUT	106	CUT	108	–	–	–	108
(United States)	Chad Campbell	106	87,550	CUT	108	T60	107	–	–	–	107
(United States)	Bob Estes	107	87,475	T65	107	CUT	109	–	–	–	109
(United States)	Robert Garrigus	108	87,400	T9	92	T65	96	–	–	–	96
(United States)	Jeff Overton	109	87,325	CUT	109	CUT	111	–	–	–	111
(United States)	Ben Curtis	110	87,250	CUT	111	CUT	114	–	–	–	114
(United States)	Tommy Armour III	111	87,175	CUT	112	T60	112	–	–	–	112
(United States)	J. B. Holmes	112	87,100	T41	110	CUT	113	–	–	–	113
(United States)	George McNeill	113	87,025	CUT	114	T17	106	–	–	–	106
(Sweden)	Daniel Chopra	114	86,950	CUT	117	T70	115	–	–	–	115
(United States)	D. J. Trahan	115	86,875	T60	116	CUT	117	–	–	–	117
(United States)	Harrison Frazar	116	86,800	CUT	119	CUT	119	–	–	–	119
(United States)	J. P. Hayes	117	86,725	T54	118	WD	118	–	–	–	118
(United States)	Brett Quigley	118	86,650	T25	115	CUT	116	–	–	–	116
(Australia)	Stephen Allan	119	86,575	CUT	121	–	–	–	–	–	121
(Australia)	Mathew Goggin	120	86,500	CUT	122	–	–	–	–	–	122
(United States)	Doug LaBelle II	121	86,425	T41	120	T47	120	–	–	–	120
(Germany)	Alex Čejka	122	86,350	CUT	124	–	–	–	–	–	124
(United States)	Joe Durant	123	86,275	T60	123	–	–	–	–	–	123
(United States)	John Merrick	124	86,200	CUT	129	–	–	–	–	–	129
(United States)	Bill Haas	125	86,125	T48	126	–	–	–	–	–	126
(United States)	Jason Bohn	126	86,050	DNP	131	–	–	–	–	–	131
(United States)	Johnson Wagner	127	85,975	T65	130	–	–	–	–	–	130
(United States)	Jason Dufner	128	85,900	T25	127	–	–	–	–	–	127
(United States)	Frank Lickliter	129	85,825	T41	132	–	–	–	–	–	132
(Australia)	Gavin Coles	130	85,750	WD	133	–	–	–	–	–	133
(United States)	Ryan Armour	131	85,675	T21	128	–	–	–	–	–	128
(United States)	Bob Heintz	132	85,600	T17	125	–	–	–	–	–	125
(United States)	Ryan Palmer	133	85,525	DNP	134	–	–	–	–	–	134
(United States)	Rich Beem	134	85,450	T7	113	T30	110	–	–	–	110
(United States)	Tripp Isenhour	135	85,375	WD	135	–	–	–	–	–	135
(United States)	Billy Andrade	136	85,300	CUT	136	–	–	–	–	–	136
(Denmark)	Anders Hansen	137	85,225	CUT	137	–	–	–	–	–	137
(Sweden)	Jesper Parnevik	138	85,150	CUT	139	–	–	–	–	–	139
(United States)	Corey Pavin	139	85,075	T54	138	–	–	–	–	–	138
(Japan)	Shigeki Maruyama	140	85,000	CUT	140	–	–	–	–	–	140
(United States)	Michael Putnam	141	84,925	CUT	141	–	–	–	–	–	141
(United States)	Bob Tway	142	84,850	CUT	143	–	–	–	–	–	143
(Australia)	Andrew Buckle	143	84,775	T65	142	–	–	–	–	–	142
(United States)	Jeff Gove	144	84,700	CUT	144	–	–	–	–	–	144
