= Ginn sur Mer Classic =

Golf tournament formerly on the PGA Tour

Tournament information
- Location: Palm Coast, Florida
- Established: 2007
- Courses: Ginn Hammock Beach Resort (Conservatory Course)
- Par: 72
- Length: 7,663 yards (7,007 m)
- Tour: PGA Tour
- Format: Stroke play
- Prize fund: US$4,600,000
- Month played: October/November
- Final year: 2008

Tournament record score
- Aggregate: 273 Daniel Chopra (2007)
- To par: −19 as above

Final champion
- (United States) Ryan Palmer
- Location in the United States Location in Florida

The Ginn sur Mer Classic was a PGA Tour golf tournament held in Florida that lasted for two years, 2007 and 2008.

It was announced in June 2007 as a replacement for the Running Horse Golf Championship, another proposed new tournament that collapsed before its first outing. The PGA Tour and Ginn Resorts had agreed to a five-year deal under which the tournament would be played at several Ginn Resorts properties. After several tournaments played in Florida, the plan was to eventually relocate it to the Ginn Sur Mer resort then under construction on Grand Bahama island in The Bahamas. The Ginn sur Mer Classic was a PGA Tour Fall Series event.

In 2007, the tournament was played at Tesoro Club in Port St. Lucie, Florida. Daniel Chopra won the event, and the total purse was US$4,500,000.

In 2008, The Conservatory Course at Ginn Hammock Beach Resort in Palm Coast, Florida hosted the event. The purse was $4,600,000. The 2008 tournament was won by Ryan Palmer in wet, windy, rainy conditions, after he made a ten foot birdie putt on the final hole.

Due to financial problems of the title sponsor, the tournament was cancelled after the 2008 PGA Tour season.

== Winners ==
Year	Winner	Score	To par	Margin of victory	Runners-up
2008	(United States) Ryan Palmer	281	−7	1 stroke	(United States) Ken Duke (United States) Michael Letzig (United States) George McNeill (United States) Vaughn Taylor (United States) Nicholas Thompson
2007	(Sweden) Daniel Chopra	273	−19	1 stroke	(Sweden) Freddie Jacobson (Japan) Shigeki Maruyama
