= Ryan Palmer =

American professional golfer (born 1976)

Personal information
- Full name: Ryan Hunter Palmer
- Nationality: United States
- Born: September 19, 1976 (age 50) Amarillo, Texas, U.S.
- Height: 5 ft 11 in (1.80 m)
- Weight: 175 lb (79 kg; 12.5 st)
- Spouse: Jennifer Fuller (m. 2002)
- Children: 2

Career
- Sport: Golf
- College: University of North Texas; Texas A&M University
- Turned professional: 2000
- Current tour: PGA Tour
- Former tour: European Tour
- Professional wins: 9
- Highest ranking: 23 (April 5, 2015)

Number of wins by tour
- PGA Tour: 4
- PGA Tour of Australasia: 1
- Korn Ferry Tour: 1
- Other: 4

Best results in major championships
- Masters Tournament: 10th: 2011
- PGA Championship: T5: 2014
- U.S. Open: T21: 2011
- The Open Championship: T30: 2011, 2015, 2016

Ryan Hunter Palmer (born September 19, 1976) is an American professional golfer who plays on the PGA Tour.

== Early life and amateur career ==
Born and raised in Amarillo, Texas, Palmer graduated from Amarillo High School in 1995. He played college golf at the University of North Texas (one year) and then transferred to Texas A&M University for his final three years and graduated in 2000.

== Professional career ==
Palmer turned professional in 2000. He played on the mini-tours (Tight Lies Tour and Hooters Tour) from 2000 to 2002; he won several tournaments on the Tight Lies Tour and topped the money list in 2002. He played the Nationwide Tour in 2003, winning the Clearwater Classic and finishing 6th on the money list to earn his 2004 PGA Tour card.

Palmer's first career PGA Tour win came at the 2004 FUNAI Classic at the Walt Disney World Resort, with a three stroke victory over Briny Baird and Vijay Singh. Four years later, he earned his second career win during the PGA Tour Fall Series, at the 2008 Ginn sur Mer Classic where wet, rainy conditions made the course play tough all week. He won by making a ten-foot putt for birdie on the final hole on Sunday to finish seven under par and win by one stroke over five players. He was 143rd on the money list entering the week, but this win secured his playing status on Tour for 2009 and 2010.

In January 2010, Palmer won his third career PGA Tour title at the Sony Open in Hawaii. A final round 66 secured his victory by one stroke over Robert Allenby.

Palmer came close to winning a fourth career title at his hometown event the HP Byron Nelson Championship in Texas in May 2011. Palmer entered the final round leading by one stroke, but as the final round progressed in windy conditions he had to hole a birdie putt on the last to enter a playoff with Keegan Bradley. On the first playoff hole, the 18th, both players hit their tee shots out to the right amongst the trees. Bradley played his approach to just short of the green whereas Palmer hooked his approach shot into the water. Palmer pitched up close to the hole and made bogey but Bradley was able to win with a pitch and putt par.

In March 2014, Palmer lost another sudden-death playoff at the Honda Classic, after missing a five footer for what would have been the win on the 18th green in regulation play. He entered the four-man playoff, having been the only one to shoot an under-par final round. However, in the playoff, after missing the green in two, he could not get up and down, leaving Russell Henley to hole from three feet for victory. This was Palmer's second runner-up finish of the year, after finishing two shots behind Patrick Reed at the Humana Challenge in January 2014.

Palmer started the 2017–18 season on a Major Medical Extension under the family crisis provision as his wife underwent chemotherapy treatment. He met the terms of his medical extension at the CareerBuilder Challenge, then lost in a sudden-death playoff at the Farmers Insurance Open the following week. Trying to end an eight-year winless drought on tour, Palmer, playing in the final group, birdied the 72nd hole to join a playoff with Jason Day and Alex Norén. However, Palmer was eliminated at the first extra hole, as he could only make par to the others' birdies on the 18th.

In April 2019, Palmer won the Zurich Classic with teammate Jon Rahm.

== Professional wins (9) ==
=== PGA Tour wins (4) ===
No.	Date	Tournament	Winning score	To par	Margin of victory	Runner(s)-up
1	Oct 24, 2004	Funai Classic at the Walt Disney World Resort	68-68-68-62=266	−22	3 strokes	(United States) Briny Baird, (Fiji) Vijay Singh
2	Nov 2, 2008	Ginn sur Mer Classic	67-71-72-71=281	−7	1 stroke	(United States) Ken Duke, (United States) Michael Letzig, (United States) George McNeill, (United States) Vaughn Taylor, (United States) Nicholas Thompson
3	Jan 17, 2010	Sony Open in Hawaii	65-66-68-66=265	−15	1 stroke	(Australia) Robert Allenby
4	Apr 28, 2019	Zurich Classic of New Orleans (with (Spain) Jon Rahm)	64-65-64-69=262	−26	3 strokes	(England) Tommy Fleetwood and (Spain) Sergio García

PGA Tour playoff record (0–3)

No.	Year	Tournament	Opponent(s)	Result
1	2011	HP Byron Nelson Championship	(United States) Keegan Bradley	Lost to par on first extra hole
2	2014	The Honda Classic	(United States) Russell Henley, (Scotland) Russell Knox, (Northern Ireland) Rory McIlroy	Henley won with birdie on first extra hole
3	2018	Farmers Insurance Open	(Australia) Jason Day, (Sweden) Alex Norén	Day won with birdie on sixth extra hole Palmer eliminated by birdie on first hole

=== PGA Tour of Australasia wins (1) ===
No.	Date	Tournament	Winning score	To par	Margin of victory	Runner-up
1	Mar 9, 2003	Clearwater Classic^{1}	69-63-71-68=271	−17	3 strokes	(Australia) Andre Stolz

^{1}Co-sanctioned by the Nationwide Tour

=== Nationwide Tour wins (1) ===
No.	Date	Tournament	Winning score	To par	Margin of victory	Runner-up
1	Mar 9, 2003	Clearwater Classic^{1}	69-63-71-68=271	−17	3 strokes	(Australia) Andre Stolz

^{1}Co-sanctioned by the PGA Tour of Australasia

=== Tight Lies Tour wins (4) ===
- 2000 CapRock Charity Classic
- 2002 Valley Open, Sprint PCS Open at Lake Charles, Sprint PCS Open at Shadow Ridge

== Results in major championships ==
Results not in chronological order in 2020.

Tournament	1998	1999
Masters Tournament		
U.S. Open	CUT	
The Open Championship		
PGA Championship		

Tournament	2000	2001	2002	2003	2004	2005	2006	2007	2008	2009
Masters Tournament						T39				
U.S. Open								CUT		
The Open Championship										
PGA Championship						T47	T49			CUT

Tournament	2010	2011	2012	2013	2014	2015	2016	2017	2018
Masters Tournament	CUT	10	CUT			T33			
U.S. Open		T21		CUT	CUT	T52		CUT	
The Open Championship		T30			T58	T30	T30		
PGA Championship	T33	T19	CUT	T47	T5	CUT	T42		

Tournament	2019	2020	2021	2022
Masters Tournament			T34	CUT
PGA Championship	CUT	T43	CUT	CUT
U.S. Open		CUT	CUT	
The Open Championship	CUT	NT	CUT	

Top 10
Did not play

CUT = missed the half-way cut
"T" = tied
NT = No tournament due to COVID-19 pandemic

=== Summary ===
Tournament	Wins	2nd	3rd	Top-5	Top-10	Top-25	Events	Cuts made
Masters Tournament	0	0	0	0	1	1	7	4
PGA Championship	0	0	0	1	1	2	14	8
U.S. Open	0	0	0	0	0	1	9	2
The Open Championship	0	0	0	0	0	0	6	4
Totals	0	0	0	1	2	4	36	18

- Most consecutive cuts made – 5 (twice)
- Longest streak of top-10s – 1 (twice)

== Results in The Players Championship ==
Tournament	2005	2006	2007	2008	2009
The Players Championship	CUT	CUT	T75		CUT

Tournament	2010	2011	2012	2013	2014	2015	2016	2017	2018	2019
The Players Championship	CUT	CUT	CUT	T5	T59	CUT	T23	CUT	T23	CUT

Tournament	2020	2021	2022	2023
The Players Championship	C	T17	CUT	CUT

Top 10
Did not play

CUT = missed the halfway cut
"T" indicates a tie for a place
C = Canceled after the first round due to the COVID-19 pandemic

== Results in World Golf Championships ==
Results not in chronological order before 2015.

Tournament	2005	2006	2007	2008	2009	2010	2011	2012	2013	2014	2015	2016	2017	2018	2019	2020	2021
Championship						T45	T49				T12						T54
Match Play							R32				T52					NT^{1}	17
Invitational	T3					2					T70					T15	T26
Champions						T46				T22						NT^{1}	NT^{1}

^{1}Cancelled due to COVID-19 pandemic

Top 10
Did not play

QF, R16, R32, R64 = Round in which player lost in match play
NT = No tournament
"T" = tied
Note that the HSBC Champions did not become a WGC event until 2009.

== See also ==
- 2003 Nationwide Tour graduates
