= Charles Howell III =

American professional golfer (born 1979)

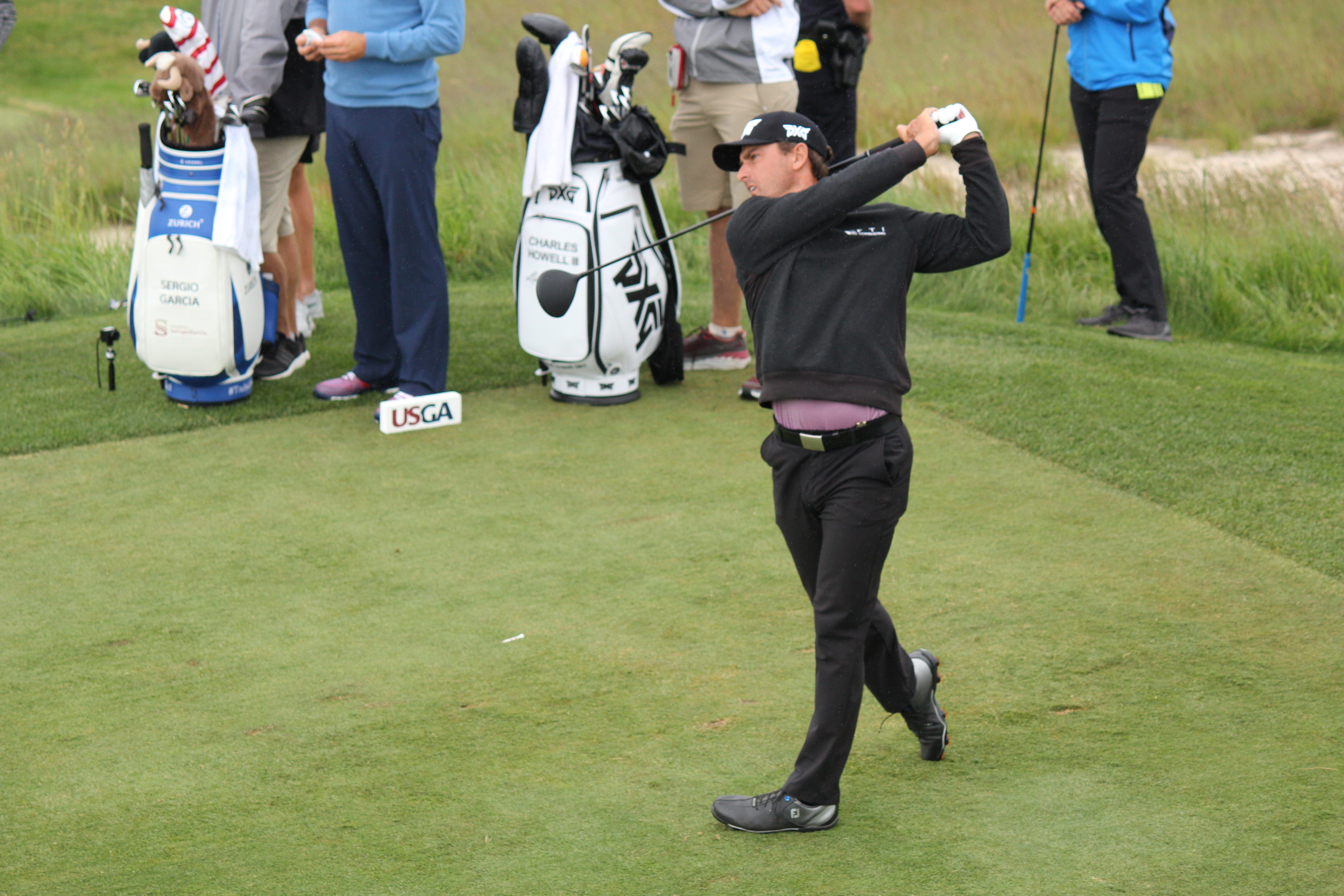
- Howell III at the 2018 U.S. Open

Personal information
- Full name: Charles Gordon Howell III
- Nickname: Chucky Three Sticks
- Nationality: United States
- Born: June 20, 1979 (age 47) Augusta, Georgia, U.S.
- Height: 5 ft 11 in (1.80 m)
- Weight: 155 lb (70 kg; 11.1 st)
- Spouse: Heather Howell
- Children: 2

Career
- Sport: Golf
- College: Oklahoma State University
- Turned professional: 2000
- Current tour: LIV Golf
- Former tour: PGA Tour
- Professional wins: 4
- Highest ranking: 15 (February 23, 2003)

Number of wins by tour
- PGA Tour: 3
- LIV Golf: 1

Best results in major championships
- Masters Tournament: T13: 2004
- PGA Championship: T10: 2003
- U.S. Open: T18: 2002
- The Open Championship: T28: 2011

Achievements and awards
- Haskins Award: 2000
- PGA Tour Rookie of the Year: 2001

Charles Gordon Howell III (born June 20, 1979) is an American professional golfer who currently plays on LIV Golf and formerly on the PGA Tour. He has been featured in the top 15 of the Official World Golf Ranking and ranked 9th on the PGA Tour money list in 2002. Known as one of the most consistent players on tour, he has garnered over 90 top-ten finishes in his career, earning about $42 million and has three PGA Tour victories, his most recent in 2018.

== Early years and amateur career ==
Howell was born and raised in Augusta, Georgia, the home town of the Masters Tournament. He was introduced to golf at age 7 by next-door neighbor, Graham Hill, with whom he is still friends. He was a member of Augusta Country Club, which is adjacent to Amen Corner at Augusta National Golf Club. Howell graduated from Westminster Schools of Augusta, and soon after attended Oklahoma State University, where he majored in Business Management. In 2000, he was a member of Oklahoma State's winning team and also the individual winner at the NCAA Division I Golf Championship with a record-setting 23-under-par performance. Also in 2000, he won the Haskins Award honoring the most outstanding collegiate golfer in the United States.

Howell played in three professional events as an amateur. At the age of 17, Howell participated in his first PGA Tour event. He entered the Buick Challenge but missed the cut. The next year he missed the cut at the Canon Greater Hartford Open.

== Professional career ==
=== 2000 ===
Howell turned professional in 2000. He played in his first tournament as a professional at the Canon Greater Hartford Open on July 2. He finished tied in 32nd place. Howell finished in 3rd at the John Deere Classic in only his third event. Howell played in 13 events in 2000 and made 7 cuts. He earned $263,533 but did not have an official money list rank because he was not a full PGA Tour member. He had his first career runner-up finishes on the Buy.com Tour at the Greensboro Open.

=== 2001 ===
Howell placed in the top-10 in two of his first four events of the 2001 season. In July at the Greater Milwaukee Open he lost to Shigeki Maruyama in a playoff. Howell also placed in 4th at the Reno-Tahoe Open and he finished in a tie for 3rd at the Michelob Championship at Kingsmill. Howell entered 24 events in 2001 and he made 20 cuts. Howell earned $1,520,632 and recorded five top-10 finishes. Just like in 2000, Howell did not have an official money list rank because he was not a full PGA Tour member. Due to his successful year, Howell won the PGA Tour Rookie of the Year award.

Also, in February Howell played in two European Tour events in Australia. He finished in a tie for 67th at the Heineken Classic and in a tie for 39th at the Greg Norman Holden International.

=== 2002 ===
Howell became a full PGA Tour member for the 2002 season. He had a strong start to the season by placing in the top-10 in three of his first five events. Howell won his first PGA Tour tournament at the Michelob Championship at Kingsmill in October. Four weeks later he finished in second at The Tour Championship. He finished 2 strokes behind champion Vijay Singh. Howell entered 32 events in 2002 and made 27 cuts. He recorded seven top-10 finishes. Howell earned $2,702,747 and finished 9th on the money list.

=== 2003 ===
Early in the 2003 season, Howell lost in a playoff to Mike Weir at the Nissan Open. Howell recorded his best finish in a major at the PGA Championship in August. He finished tied for 10th place. Howell finished as the runner-up at The Tour Championship for the second year in a row. This time he finished 3 strokes behind Chad Campbell. Two weeks later Howell represented the United States in the Presidents Cup. The competition ended in a draw. Howell was paired with Tiger Woods for the foursomes and four-ball matches. His overall record at the competition was 3-2 including a match play victory over fellow young golfer Adam Scott. Howell defeated Scott by the score of 5&4. Howell entered 31 tournaments and made 29 cuts. He recorded six top-10s and earned $2,568,955. Howell finished in 14th on the money list.

=== 2004 ===
Howell's 2004 season did not go as well as previous ones. His best finished was a solo 2nd at the Booz Allen Classic in June. He finished 4 strokes behind Adam Scott. Howell shot a 61 (-10) in the 1st round which still stands as his lowest round in a PGA Tour tournament. Howell entered 30 tournaments and made 22 cuts. He recorded five top-10 finishes. He earned $1,703,485 and finished 33rd on the money list.

=== 2005 ===
Howell started off 2005 strong with top three finishes in consecutive weeks. He finished in a tie for 3rd at the Sony Open in Hawaii and in a tie for second at the Buick Invitational. Howell was not able to pick up a victory in 2005 but he recorded six top-10 finishes including five top 5 finishes. Howell entered 29 tournaments and made 21 cuts. He earned $2,074,329 and finished 29th on the money list.

=== 2006 ===
Howell did not have a very successful season in 2006. His only success was a tie for second at the Zurich Classic of New Orleans and a solo second at the 84 Lumber Classic. Howell entered 30 tournaments and made 20 cuts. He recorded three top-10 finishes and only five top 25 finishes. He earned $1,553,105 and finished in 52nd on the money list.

=== 2007 ===
Howell bounced back from his disappointing 2006 season with a successful 2007 season. He recorded two runner-up finishes in his first three tournaments. He finished in a tie for 2nd at the Sony Open in Hawaii and in solo second at the Buick Invitational. On February 18, 2007 Howell won his second PGA Tour event. He won the Nissan Open by defeating Phil Mickelson in a playoff. The next week Howell made it to the round of 16 at the 2007 WGC-Accenture Match Play Championship. Two weeks later he finished in a tie for 6th at the PODS Championship. Howell did not enjoy much success after that. His best finish after the PODS Championship in March was at the WGC-CA Championship where he finished in a tie for 16th place. Howell entered the 2007 FedEx Cup Playoffs in 8th place in the points standings. He played in all 4 playoff tournaments. His best finish came at the BMW Championship where he finished in a tie for 18th place. Howell went on to finish in 18th place in the final FedEx Cup points standings. Howell has earned $2,832,091 in 2007 and is currently in 18th place on the money list. He has entered 26 tournaments, making 19 cuts. He has recorded five top-10 finishes. Howell also participated in the Presidents Cup in September. The United States won the competition and Howell was 2–2 in his matches. He won his singles match against Stuart Appleby by the score of 2&1.

=== 2008 ===
Howell recorded his worst finish on the money list in his career in 2008, finishing in 69th with $1,449,232. He finished tied for 8th in the first tournament of the year at the Mercedes-Benz Championship. His next top-10 finish came at the AT&T Classic in May where he finished tied for 8th. He led the tournament going into the final round but shot a 74 (+2) to lose the lead. Howell shared the lead going into the final round of the Turning Stone Resort Championship in October but ended up finishing tied for 3rd after shooting a 73 (+1). Howell made 22 of 31 cuts on the year while recording four top-10s, 12 top 25s and finishing 95th in the FedEx Cup standings.

=== 2009 ===
Howell started the 2009 season strong in January with a 4th-place finish in the Sony Open in Hawaii; three behind winner Zach Johnson. In March, Howell finished with a respectable T21 at the Puerto Rico Open. The next week, Howell had his best finish of the season by finishing T2 in the Transitions Championship. Howell was in position to win the tournament after the 14th hole, but subsequently bogeyed two of the last four holes to finish one stroke behind winner Retief Goosen. The week after the Transitions Championship, Howell finished T22 at the Arnold Palmer Invitational. At the Zurich Classic of New Orleans, Howell was again in position to win the tournament before bogeying two of the last four holes to finish two behind winner Jerry Kelly. Howell missed 6 cuts in 8 events from May to July. Howell recently made an instructional switch from David Leadbetter to Todd Anderson of the Sea Island Golf Club.

=== 2010 ===
Howell started the 2010 season strong posting top-10s in three of his first six tournaments, most notably a T-5 at the Sony Open in Hawaii. Howell had six top-10 finishes in 2010, while missing only 5 of 28 cuts. His best finish in 2010 was T-4 at the Waste Management Phoenix Open. He made $1,482,211.

=== 2011 ===
2011 was another consistent year for Howell. Howell's best finish of the year was a T-3, which happened twice in back to back weeks at the FedEx St. Jude Classic and the AT&T National tournaments. Howell had seven top-10 finishes in 2011 and qualified for the Tour Championship. He made $2,509,223.

=== 2012 ===
Howell only had two top-10 finishes in 2012: T2 at the Sony Open in Hawaii and T7 at the McGladrey Classic.

He changed coaches before the fall series to Gary Gilchrist.

=== 2013 ===
Howell had five top-10 finishes in 2013: T-3 at the Sony Open in Hawaii, playoff loss (T-2) at the Humana Challenge, T-9 at the Farmers Insurance Open, T-10 at the Shell Houston Open and T-10 at the Wells Fargo Championship. He finished 38th on the money list and 35th in the FedEx Cup.

=== 2014 ===
Howell had a good season in 2014 having six top-10 finishes and made 24 cuts. He finished T3 at the HP Byron Nelson Championship, T5 at the Shriners Hospitals for Children Open, T6 at the Waste Management Phoenix Open, T6 at the OHL Classic at Mayakoba, T7 at the CIMB Classic, and T8 at the Sony Open in Hawaii.

=== 2015 ===
Howell had another good season in 2015 having three top-10 finishes out of 23 cuts. He finished T5 at the Shell Houston Open, T5 at the Farmers Insurance Open, and T10 at the Valspar Championship. He finished T65 at the PGA Championship where he hadn't made the cut since 2011. He finished the end of 2015 being 77th on the money list and 79th on the FedEx Cup rankings.

=== 2016 ===
Howell had five top-10 finishes and earned $1,974,962 in the 2015–16 PGA Tour season. He made 21 cuts in 25 events. His best finish was T4 at the AT&T Byron Nelson. He finished 52nd in the FedEx Cup.

=== 2017 ===
Howell was the runner-up in the Farmers Insurance Open losing by three strokes to Jon Rahm. In July, he was a runner-up again, this time at the Quicken Loans National, losing in a playoff to Kyle Stanley. This took his tally of PGA Tour runner-up finishes to 16, and including one in the 2000 Buy.com Tour season, his career total is now 17. Howell finished 2017 with Tour earnings of $2,606,383, which was his highest in the last decade. The last time he earned at least that much was 2007, when he racked up $2,832,091, and it coincidentally was the year he won his last Tour title. Howell has now won at least $1,000,000 each season since his rookie year of 2001 (17 consecutive seasons), which is the second longest active streak on Tour, trailing only Phil Mickelson whose current streak started in 1996.

=== 2018 ===
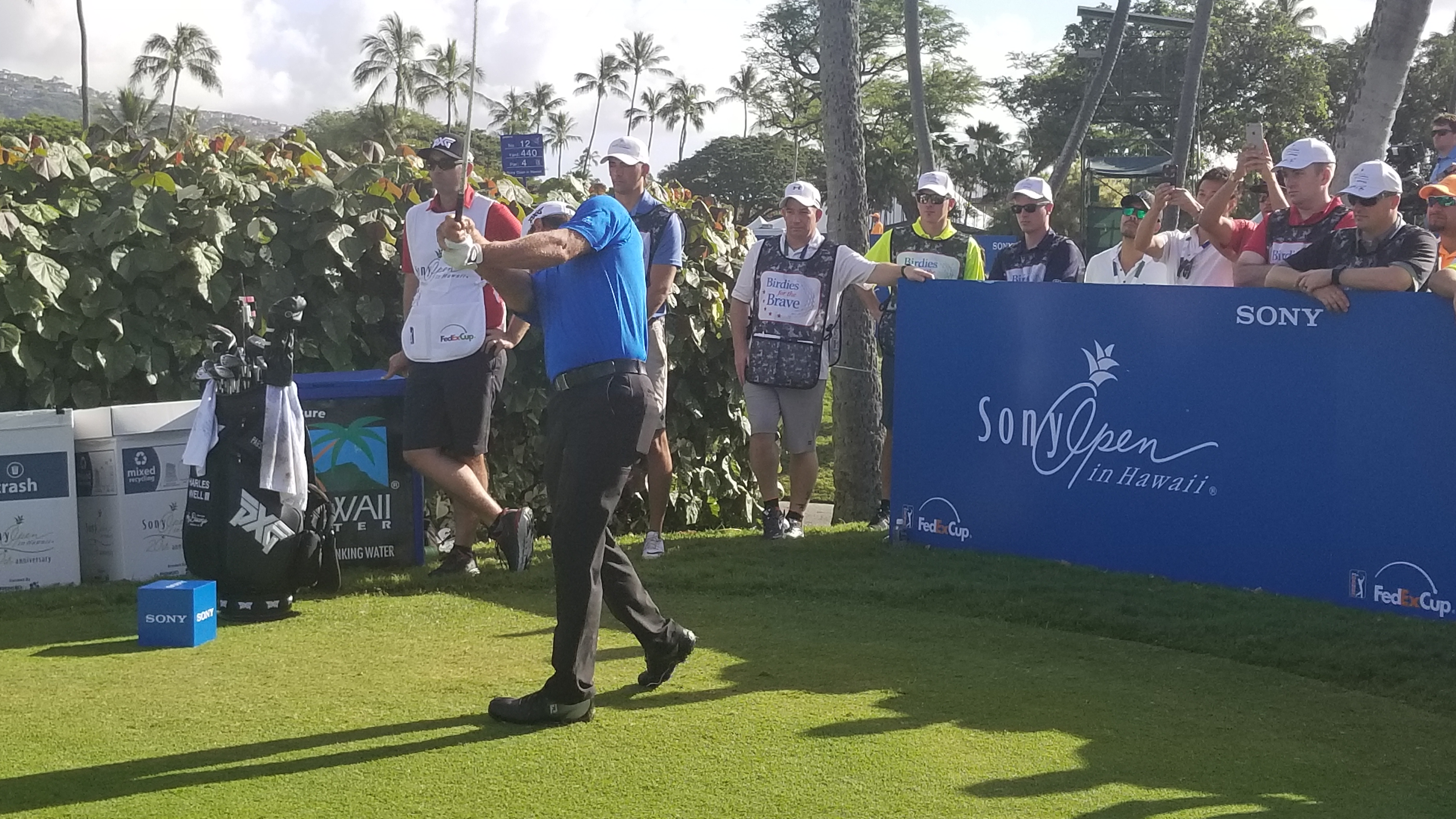
Howell III at the 2018 Sony Open in Hawaii.

Howell played in 28 events on the PGA Tour in the 2017–18 PGA Tour Season and made the cut in 24 of them. His best finish was a T4 in the OHL Classic at Mayakoba. He earned $2,179,725 and finished 53rd in the season-long FedEx Cup.

On November 18, 2018, Howell recorded his first win since 2007, defeating Patrick Rodgers on the second hole of a sudden-death playoff at the RSM Classic, and putting him at the top of the FedEx Cup standings going into the 2019 calendar year. This win gave him an exemption into the 2019 Masters Tournament in his hometown of Augusta, Georgia. He has not played in the Masters since 2012. This tournament was part of the 2018–19 PGA Tour season.

=== 2019 ===
Howell played in 27 events on the PGA Tour in the 2018–19 PGA Tour season and made the cut in 21 of them. His best finish was his win at the RSM Classic. He had 12 top-25 finishes. He earned $3,039,049 and finished 28th in the season-long FedEx Cup.

=== 2020 ===
In 2020, Howell made 14 of 20 cuts and had three top 10 finishes. He made the FedEx Cup Playoffs for the 14th consecutive year. He finished at No. 69 in the 2020 FedEx Cup.

=== 2021 ===
In 2021, Howell made 14 of 21 cuts but finished 139 in the 2021 FedEx Cup. He failed to make the FedEx Cup Playoffs for the first time in its 15 year existence. However, Howell retained his PGA Tour card because of his win in the 2018 RSM Classic.

=== 2022 ===
In 2022, Howell made 11 of 16 cuts on the PGA Tour with a best finish of T4 at the Valero Texas Open. In July 2022, Howell joined LIV Golf.

=== 2023 ===
In February, Howell won the LIV Golf Mayakoba event for his first individual title on the LIV Golf League.

== Personal ==
Howell lives in Orlando, Florida with his wife, Heather (formerly Heather Myers), and their two children. Politically, Howell is a Republican albeit a "fanatically moderate" one.

== Amateur wins ==
- 1996 AJGA Tournament of Champions
- 2000 NCAA Division I Championship

== Professional wins (4) ==
=== PGA Tour wins (3) ===
No.	Date	Tournament	Winning score	Margin of victory	Runner(s)-up
1	Oct 6, 2002	Michelob Championship at Kingsmill	−14 (70-65-68-67=270)	2 strokes	(United States) Scott Hoch, (United States) Brandt Jobe
2	Feb 18, 2007	Nissan Open	−16 (69-65-69-65=268)	Playoff	(United States) Phil Mickelson
3	Nov 18, 2018	RSM Classic	−19 (64-64-68-67=263)	Playoff	(United States) Patrick Rodgers

PGA Tour playoff record (2–4)

No.	Year	Tournament	Opponent(s)	Result
1	2001	Greater Milwaukee Open	(Japan) Shigeki Maruyama	Lost to birdie on first extra hole
2	2003	Nissan Open	(Canada) Mike Weir	Lost to birdie on second extra hole
3	2007	Nissan Open	(United States) Phil Mickelson	Won with par on third extra hole
4	2013	Humana Challenge	(United States) Brian Gay, (Sweden) David Lingmerth	Gay won with birdie on second extra hole Lingmerth eliminated by birdie on first hole
5	2017	Quicken Loans National	(United States) Kyle Stanley	Lost to par on first extra hole
6	2018	RSM Classic	(United States) Patrick Rodgers	Won with birdie on second extra hole

=== LIV Golf League wins (1) ===
No.	Date	Tournament	Winning score	Margin of victory	Runner-up
1	Feb 26, 2023	LIV Golf Mayakoba^{1}	−16 (68-66-63=197)	4 strokes	(United States) Peter Uihlein

^{1}Co-sanctioned by the MENA Tour

== Results in major championships ==
Results not in chronological order in 2020.

Tournament	2001	2002	2003	2004	2005	2006	2007	2008	2009
Masters Tournament		T29	T28	T13	CUT	CUT	T30	CUT	
U.S. Open	CUT	T18	T53	T36	T75	T37	T51	CUT	
The Open Championship			T65	T42	CUT		CUT	CUT	CUT
PGA Championship	T22	T17	T10	T31	T15	CUT	T42	T47	CUT

Tournament	2010	2011	2012	2013	2014	2015	2016	2017	2018
Masters Tournament			T19						
U.S. Open			CUT						T25
The Open Championship		T28	T64					CUT	CUT
PGA Championship	T48	T26	CUT	CUT	CUT	T65		T73	T71

Tournament	2019	2020
Masters Tournament	T32	T46
PGA Championship	T41	
U.S. Open	T52	30
The Open Championship		NT

Top 10
Did not play

CUT = missed the half-way cut
"T" = tied
NT = No tournament due to COVID-19 pandemic

=== Summary ===
Tournament	Wins	2nd	3rd	Top-5	Top-10	Top-25	Events	Cuts made
Masters Tournament	0	0	0	0	0	2	10	7
PGA Championship	0	0	0	0	1	4	18	13
U.S. Open	0	0	0	0	0	2	12	9
The Open Championship	0	0	0	0	0	0	10	4
Totals	0	0	0	0	1	8	50	33

- Most consecutive cuts made – 12 (2001 PGA – 2004 PGA)
- Longest streak of top-10s – 1

== Results in The Players Championship ==
Tournament	2002	2003	2004	2005	2006	2007	2008	2009
The Players Championship	T60	T32	CUT	CUT	T53	79	CUT	CUT

Tournament	2010	2011	2012	2013	2014	2015	2016	2017	2018	2019
The Players Championship	CUT	CUT	CUT	T66	CUT	T56	CUT		T17	T35

Tournament	2020	2021
The Players Championship	C	T9

Top 10
Did not play

CUT = missed the halfway cut
"T" indicates a tie for a place
C = Canceled after the first round due to the COVID-19 pandemic

== Results in World Golf Championships ==
Results not in chronological order prior to 2015.

Tournament	2002	2003	2004	2005	2006	2007	2008	2009	2010	2011	2012	2013	2014	2015	2016	2017	2018	2019
Championship		T21	T59			T16	T51				T17	T12						T14
Match Play	R32	R64	R64	R64	R64	R16	R32					R32				R16	R16	T24
Invitational		T21	T9			T39	T27	T29										
Champions																T15		T36

Tournament	2020
Championship	T53
Match Play	NT^{1}
Invitational	
Champions	NT^{1}

^{1}Cancelled due to COVID-19 pandemic

Top 10
Did not play

QF, R16, R32, R64 = Round in which player lost in match play
NT = no tournament
"T" = tied
Note that the HSBC Champions did not become a WGC event until 2009.

== PGA Tour career summary ==
Season	Starts	Cuts made	Wins	2nd	3rd	Top-10	Top-25	Best finish	Earnings ($)	Money list rank
1996	1	0	0	0	0	0	0	Cut	0	n/a
1997	1	0	0	0	0	0	0	Cut	0	n/a
2000	13	7	0	0	1	1	2	3	263,533	n/a
2001	24	20	0	1	1	5	14	2	1,520,632	n/a
2002	32	27	1	1	1	7	16	1	2,702,747	9
2003	31	29	0	2	0	6	16	2	2,568,955	14
2004	30	22	0	1	0	5	10	2	1,702,485	33
2005	29	21	0	1	1	6	13	T2	2,074,329	29
2006	30	20	0	2	0	3	5	2	1,553,105	52
2007	26	19	1	2	0	5	8	1	2,832,091	18
2008	31	22	0	0	1	4	12	T3	1,449,232	69
2009	29	21	0	2	0	3	8	T2	1,804,460	46
2010	28	23	0	0	0	6	11	T4	1,482,211	60
2011	30	25	0	0	2	7	15	T3	2,509,223	25
2012	29	20	0	1	0	2	8	T2	1,284,578	67
2013	26	19	0	1	1	5	9	T2	1,877,389	38
2014	29	24	0	0	1	6	10	T3	1,997,044	45
2015	30	23	0	0	0	3	7	T5	1,257,361	77
2016	25	21	0	0	0	5	14	T4	1,974,962	47
2017	23	20	0	2	0	5	10	2	2,606,383	37
2018	28	24	0	0	0	4	14	T4	2,179,725	53
2019	27	21	1	0	0	5	12	1	3,039,049	27
2020	20	14	0	0	1	3	6	T3	1,371,807	65
2021	21	14	0	0	0	1	5	T9	947,154	139
2022	16	11	0	0	0	1	5	T4	1,026,002	122
Career*	609	467	3	16	10	98	230	1	42,025,458	n/a**

* As of the 2022 season
**Howell III was removed from the PGA Tour Career Earnings list once he joined LIV Golf in 2022. As of September 2022, he would be in the top 20 all-time.

== U.S. national team appearances ==
Amateur

- Palmer Cup: 1998 (tie)

Professional

- Presidents Cup: 2003 (tie), 2007 (winners)
