= 2007 PGA Tour =

Golf tour season

2007 PGA Tour season
- Duration: January 4, 2007 – November 4, 2007
- Number of official events: 47
- Most wins: (United States) Tiger Woods (7)
- FedEx Cup: (United States) Tiger Woods
- Money list: (United States) Tiger Woods
- PGA Tour Player of the Year: (United States) Tiger Woods
- PGA Player of the Year: (United States) Tiger Woods
- Rookie of the Year: (United States) Brandt Snedeker

The 2007 PGA Tour was the 92nd season of the PGA Tour, the main professional golf tour in the United States. It was also the 39th season since separating from the PGA of America, and the inaugural edition of the FedEx Cup.

== Schedule ==
The following table lists official events during the 2007 season.

Date	Tournament	Location	Purse (US$)	Winner (Note: The number in parentheses after each winner's name is the number of PGA Tour events they had won up to and including that tournament. This information is only shown for PGA Tour members.)	OWGR points	Notes
Jan 7	Mercedes-Benz Championship	Hawaii	5,500,000	(Fiji) Vijay Singh (30)	50	Winners-only event
Jan 14	Sony Open in Hawaii	Hawaii	5,200,000	(United States) Paul Goydos (2)	56	
Jan 21	Bob Hope Chrysler Classic	California	5,000,000	(United States) Charley Hoffman (1)	40	Pro-Am
Jan 28	Buick Invitational	California	5,200,000	(United States) Tiger Woods (55)	50	
Feb 4	FBR Open	Arizona	6,000,000	(Australia) Aaron Baddeley (2)	54	
Feb 11	AT&T Pebble Beach National Pro-Am	California	5,500,000	(United States) Phil Mickelson (30)	48	Pro-Am
Feb 18	Nissan Open	California	5,200,000	(United States) Charles Howell III (2)	70	
Feb 25	WGC-Accenture Match Play Championship	Arizona	8,000,000	(Sweden) Henrik Stenson (1)	76	World Golf Championship
Feb 25	Mayakoba Golf Classic	Mexico	3,500,000	(United States) Fred Funk (8)	24	New tournament Alternate event
Mar 4	The Honda Classic	Florida	5,500,000	(United States) Mark Wilson (1)	50	
Mar 11	PODS Championship	Florida	5,300,000	(United States) Mark Calcavecchia (13)	48	
Mar 18	Arnold Palmer Invitational	Florida	5,500,000	(Fiji) Vijay Singh (31)	68	Invitational
Mar 25	WGC-CA Championship	Florida	8,000,000	(United States) Tiger Woods (56)	76	World Golf Championship
Apr 1	Shell Houston Open	Texas	5,500,000	(Australia) Adam Scott (5)	46	
Apr 8	Masters Tournament	Georgia	7,000,000	(United States) Zach Johnson (2)	100	Major championship
Apr 15	Verizon Heritage	South Carolina	5,400,000	(United States) Boo Weekley (1)	54	Invitational
Apr 22	Zurich Classic of New Orleans	Louisiana	6,100,000	(United States) Nick Watney (1)	28	
Apr 29	EDS Byron Nelson Championship	Texas	6,300,000	(United States) Scott Verplank (5)	52	
May 6	Wachovia Championship	North Carolina	6,400,000	(United States) Tiger Woods (57)	74	
May 13	The Players Championship	Florida	9,000,000	(United States) Phil Mickelson (31)	80	Flagship event
May 20	AT&T Classic	Georgia	5,400,000	(United States) Zach Johnson (3)	36	
May 27	Crowne Plaza Invitational at Colonial	Texas	6,000,000	(South Africa) Rory Sabbatini (4)	52	Invitational
Jun 3	Memorial Tournament	Ohio	6,000,000	(South Korea) K. J. Choi (5)	70	Invitational
Jun 10	Stanford St. Jude Championship	Tennessee	6,000,000	(United States) Woody Austin (3)	50	
Jun 17	U.S. Open	Pennsylvania	7,000,000	(Argentina) Ángel Cabrera (1)	100	Major championship
Jun 24	Travelers Championship	Connecticut	6,000,000	(United States) Hunter Mahan (1)	46	
Jul 1	Buick Open	Michigan	4,900,000	(United States) Brian Bateman (1)	38	
Jul 8	AT&T National	Maryland	6,000,000	(South Korea) K. J. Choi (6)	62	New tournament Invitational
Jul 15	John Deere Classic	Illinois	4,100,000	(United States) Jonathan Byrd (3)	24	
Jul 22	The Open Championship	Scotland	£4,200,000	(Republic of Ireland) Pádraig Harrington (3)	100	Major championship
Jul 22	U.S. Bank Championship in Milwaukee	Wisconsin	4,000,000	(United States) Joe Ogilvie (1)	24	Alternate event
Jul 29	Canadian Open	Canada	5,000,000	(United States) Jim Furyk (13)	32	
Aug 5	WGC-Bridgestone Invitational	Ohio	8,000,000	(United States) Tiger Woods (58)	76	World Golf Championship
Aug 5	Reno–Tahoe Open	Nevada	3,000,000	(United States) Steve Flesch (3)	24	Alternate event
Aug 12	PGA Championship	Oklahoma	7,000,000	(United States) Tiger Woods (59)	100	Major championship
Aug 19	Wyndham Championship	North Carolina	5,000,000	(United States) Brandt Snedeker (1)	24	
Aug 26	The Barclays	New York	7,000,000	(United States) Steve Stricker (4)	74	FedEx Cup playoff event
Sep 3	Deutsche Bank Championship	Massachusetts	7,000,000	(United States) Phil Mickelson (32)	74	FedEx Cup playoff event
Sep 9	BMW Championship	Illinois	7,000,000	(United States) Tiger Woods (60)	68	FedEx Cup playoff event
Sep 16	The Tour Championship	Georgia	7,000,000	(United States) Tiger Woods (61)	60	FedEx Cup playoff event
Sep 23	Turning Stone Resort Championship	New York	6,000,000	(United States) Steve Flesch (4)	30	New tournament Fall Series
Sep 30	Viking Classic	Mississippi	3,500,000	(United States) Chad Campbell (4)	24	Fall Series
Oct 7	Valero Texas Open	Texas	4,500,000	(United States) Justin Leonard (11)	24	Fall Series
Oct 14	Frys.com Open	Nevada	4,000,000	(United States) George McNeill (1)	26	Fall Series
Oct 21	Fry's Electronics Open	Arizona	5,000,000	(Canada) Mike Weir (8)	38	New tournament Fall Series
Oct 28	Ginn sur Mer Classic	Florida	4,500,000	(Sweden) Daniel Chopra (1)	24	New tournament Fall Series
Nov 4	Children's Miracle Network Classic	Florida	4,600,000	(Canada) Stephen Ames (3)	34	Fall Series

=== Unofficial events ===
The following events were sanctioned by the PGA Tour, but did not carry FedEx Cup points or official money, nor were wins official.

Date	Tournament	Location	Purse ($)	Winner(s)	Notes
Mar 27	Tavistock Cup	Florida	3,500,000	Team Lake Nona	Team event
Jun 19	CVS Caremark Charity Classic	Rhode Island	1,350,000	(United States) Stewart Cink and (United States) J. J. Henry	Team event
Sep 30	Presidents Cup	Canada	n/a	Team USA	Team event
Oct 17	PGA Grand Slam of Golf	Bermuda	1,350,000	(Argentina) Ángel Cabrera	Limited-field event
Nov 13	Wendy's 3-Tour Challenge	Nevada	1,000,000	LPGA Tour	Team event
Nov 25	Omega Mission Hills World Cup	China	5,000,000	(Scotland) Colin Montgomerie and (Scotland) Marc Warren	Team event
Nov 25	LG Skins Game	California	1,000,000	(Canada) Stephen Ames	Limited-field event
Dec 9	Merrill Lynch Shootout	Florida	2,800,000	(United States) Woody Austin and (United States) Mark Calcavecchia	Team event
Dec 16	Target World Challenge	California	5,750,000	(United States) Tiger Woods	Limited-field event

== Location of tournaments ==
Location of official tournaments of the 2007 PGA Tour in the continental United States and Canada.
4,950-point event (Players & Majors)
4,725-point event (World Golf Championships)
4,500-point event (Regular events)
2,250-point event (Alternate events)
FedEx Cup playoff event
Fall Series event
Location of official tournaments of the 2007 PGA Tour outside the continental United States and Canada.
4,950-point event (Players & Majors)
4,500-point event (Regular events)
2,250-point event (Alternate events)

== FedEx Cup ==
=== Final standings ===
For full rankings, see 2007 FedEx Cup Playoffs.

Final top 10 players in the FedEx Cup:

Position	Player	Points	Bonus money ($)
1	(United States) Tiger Woods	123,033	10,000,000
2	(United States) Steve Stricker	110,455	3,000,000
3	(United States) Phil Mickelson	109,357	2,000,000
4	(South Africa) Rory Sabbatini	105,192	1,500,000
5	(South Korea) K. J. Choi	103,765	1,000,000
6	(Australia) Aaron Baddeley	103,350	800,000
7	(United States) Zach Johnson	102,872	700,000
8	(United States) Mark Calcavecchia	102,068	600,000
9	(Spain) Sergio García	101,076	550,000
10	(Fiji) Vijay Singh	101,064	500,000

== Money list ==
The money list was based on prize money won during the season, calculated in U.S. dollars.

Position	Player	Prize money ($)
1	(United States) Tiger Woods	10,867,052
2	(United States) Phil Mickelson	5,819,988
3	(Fiji) Vijay Singh	4,728,376
4	(United States) Steve Stricker	4,663,077
5	(South Korea) K. J. Choi	4,587,859
6	(South Africa) Rory Sabbatini	4,550,040
7	(United States) Jim Furyk	4,154,046
8	(United States) Zach Johnson	3,922,338
9	(Spain) Sergio García	3,721,185
10	(Australia) Aaron Baddeley	3,441,119

== Awards ==
Award	Winner	Ref.
PGA Tour Player of the Year (Jack Nicklaus Trophy)	(United States) Tiger Woods	
PGA Player of the Year	(United States) Tiger Woods	
Rookie of the Year	(United States) Brandt Snedeker	
Scoring leader (PGA Tour – Byron Nelson Award)	(United States) Tiger Woods	
Scoring leader (PGA – Vardon Trophy)	(United States) Tiger Woods	
Comeback Player of the Year	(United States) Steve Stricker	

== See also ==
- 2007 in golf
- 2007 Champions Tour
- 2007 Nationwide Tour
