= Vaughn Taylor =

Vaughn Taylor may refer to:

- Vaughn Taylor (golfer)
- Vaughn Taylor (actor)
