= Nicholas Thompson (golfer) =

American professional golfer (born 1982)

Personal information
- Nationality: United States
- Born: December 25, 1982 (age 43) Plantation, Florida, U.S.
- Height: 6 ft 0 in (1.83 m)
- Weight: 185 lb (84 kg; 13.2 st)

Career
- Sport: Golf
- College: Georgia Tech
- Turned professional: 2005
- Current tour: Korn Ferry Tour
- Former tour: PGA Tour
- Professional wins: 1

Number of wins by tour
- PGA Tour of Australasia: 1
- Korn Ferry Tour: 1

Best results in major championships
- Masters Tournament: DNP
- PGA Championship: T24: 2008
- U.S. Open: T51: 2012
- The Open Championship: DNP

Nicholas Thompson (born December 25, 1982) is an American professional golfer who has played on the PGA Tour and the Korn Ferry Tour.

== Early life and amateur career ==
Thompson was born in Plantation, Florida. Thompson attended from Georgia Tech. He graduated in 2005 with a degree in business management. He was also a member of the 2002 ACC championship team.

== Professional career ==
In 2005, he turned professional. Thompson won his PGA Tour card for 2006 by finishing third in the 2005 qualifying school. He made 15 of 32 cuts, with one top-10 finish in 2006 and lost his tour card when he finished 180th on the money list. In 2007, he played on the Nationwide Tour, winning once, the HSBC New Zealand PGA Championship, and finishing sixth on the money list, thus earning his PGA Tour card for 2008. He recorded six top-10 finishes in the 2008 season, including a tie for seventh at The Barclays, the first tournament in the 2008 FedEx Cup. With the tie for seventh he jumped to 20th in the FedEx Cup Standings, eventually finishing 41st. Later in the season, he cashed his largest paycheck when he earned $276,000 for finishing in a tie for 2nd at the Ginn sur Mer Classic, a Fall Series event, behind Ryan Palmer. He has now earned over five million dollars since turning professional in 2005.

In 2009, Thompson recorded only one top-10 finish, at the Frys.com Open, and kept his Tour card by just two places on the final money list. His next top-10 finish came in 2010 at the Zurich Classic of New Orleans.

Since then, Thompson has played on the PGA Tour as a full status member from 2013 to the present, having returned to the Web.com Tour in 2011 and 2012. In 2013, he made 20 of 29 cuts on the PGA Tour, with seven top-25 finishes, including a tie for sixth at the Humana Challenge and a solo fourth in the Sanderson Farms Championship. He finished 66th in that season's FedEx Cup, advancing to the BMW Championship. His best finish in 2014 was a tie for fourth at the Crowne Plaza Invitational at Colonial.

== Personal life ==
His sister is LPGA Tour star Lexi Thompson. When Lexi became the youngest player to ever play in the U.S. Women's Open in 2007, Nicholas helped her in practice rounds before going to that week's Nationwide Tour event. His brother Curtis plays on the Web.com Tour.

== Amateur wins ==
- 2005 Jones Cup Invitational

== Professional wins (1) ==
=== Nationwide Tour wins (1) ===
No.	Date	Tournament	Winning score	Margin of victory	Runner-up
1	Feb 27, 2007	HSBC New Zealand PGA Championship^{1}	−8 (69-73-70-68=280)	Playoff	(Canada) David Morland IV

^{1}Co-sanctioned by the PGA Tour of Australasia

Nationwide Tour playoff record (1–0)

No.	Year	Tournament	Opponent	Result
1	2007	HSBC New Zealand PGA Championship	(Canada) David Morland IV	Won with par on first extra hole

== Results in major championships ==
Tournament	2006	2007	2008	2009	2010	2011	2012	2013
Masters Tournament								
U.S. Open	CUT						T51	T56
The Open Championship								
PGA Championship			T24					

Did not play

CUT = missed the half-way cut
"T" = tied

== U.S. national team appearances ==
Amateur

- Walker Cup: 2005 (winners)

== See also ==
- 2005 PGA Tour Qualifying School graduates
- 2007 Nationwide Tour graduates
- 2012 Web.com Tour graduates
