= David Morland IV =

Canadian professional golfer (born 1969)

Personal information
- Full name: David James Morland IV
- Nationality: Canada
- Born: April 3, 1969 (age 57) North Bay, Ontario, Canada
- Height: 5 ft 7 in (1.70 m)
- Weight: 170 lb (77 kg; 12 st)

Career
- Sport: Golf
- College: Kent State University
- Turned professional: 1991
- Current tour: European Senior Tour
- Former tours: PGA Tour; Nationwide Tour; Canadian Tour; Gateway Tour
- Professional wins: 4

Number of wins by tour
- Korn Ferry Tour: 2
- Other: 2

Best results in major championships
- Masters Tournament: DNP
- PGA Championship: DNP
- U.S. Open: CUT: 1995, 2004
- The Open Championship: DNP

David James Morland IV (born April 3, 1969) is a Canadian professional golfer. He has played on the Canadian Tour, PGA Tour, and Nationwide Tour.

== Career ==
Morland was born in North Bay, Ontario. In 1991, Morland turned professional after attending Kent State University. His first professional success came in the 1999 McDonald's Prince Edward Island Challenge on the Canadian Tour.

In late 1999, Morland finished tied for 16th place in the PGA Tour Q-school to gain a place on the tour for 2000. He had four seasons playing on the PGA Tour: in 2000, 2001, 2002, and 2004. He competed in a total of 120 PGA Tour events. His best season was 2002 when he finished 150th in the money list. He had three top-10 finishes, his best being to be tied for 5th place in the 2001 Canadian Open.

Morland also played a number of seasons on the Nationwide Tour winning twice, the 2002 Hibernia Southern Open and the 2003 SAS Carolina Classic. He also lost a playoff for the New Zealand PGA Championship in 2007. The 2003 year was his best season, finishing 18th in the money list to regain his place on the PGA Tour.

=== Senior career ===
Morland finished in third place in the 2020 European Senior Tour qualifying school, gaining a place on the tour for 2020. In the 2020 Hoag Classic, a PGA Tour Champions event played in March, Morland led after a first round 61. He had further rounds of 70 and 71 to finish tied for 7th place.

== Professional wins (4) ==
=== Nationwide Tour wins (2) ===
No.	Date	Tournament	Winning score	Margin of victory	Runners-up
1	Oct 20, 2002	Hibernia Southern Open	−19 (64-65-68=197) (Note: Shortened to 54 holes due to weather.)	3 strokes	(New Zealand) Steven Alker, (United States) John Morse
2	May 25, 2003	SAS Carolina Classic	−16 (66-68-66-68=268)	1 stroke	(United States) Rob Bradley, (United States) Vaughn Taylor

Nationwide Tour playoff record (0–1)

No.	Year	Tournament	Opponent	Result
1	2007	HSBC New Zealand PGA Championship	(United States) Nicholas Thompson	Lost to par on first extra hole

=== Canadian Tour wins (1) ===
No.	Date	Tournament	Winning score	Margin of victory	Runners-up
1	29 Aug 1999	McDonald's PEI Challenge	−9 (68-68-67-71=274)	2 strokes	(United States) Ken Duke, (South Africa) Manny Zerman

=== Gateway Tour wins (1) ===
No.	Date	Tournament	Winning score	Margin of victory	Runner-up
1	18 Jan 2006	Beach Spring A3	−11 (64-72-69=205)	1 stroke	(United States) Jess Daley

== Playoff record ==
PGA Tour of Australasia playoff record (0–1)

No.	Year	Tournament	Opponent	Result
1	2007	HSBC New Zealand PGA Championship	(United States) Nicholas Thompson	Lost to par on first extra hole

== Results in major championships ==
Tournament	1995	1996	1997	1998	1999	2000	2001	2002	2003	2004
U.S. Open	CUT									CUT

Did not play

CUT = missed the halfway cut
Note: Morland only played in the U.S. Open.

== Results in senior major championships ==
Tournament	2019	2020	2021	2022	2023	2024
The Tradition		NT				
Senior PGA Championship		NT	T72	CUT		
U.S. Senior Open		NT				T57
Senior Players Championship		T56				
Senior British Open Championship	72	NT	CUT	T41		

Did not play

CUT = missed the halfway cut
"T" indicates a tie for a place
NT = No tournament due to COVID-19 pandemic

== See also ==
- 1999 PGA Tour Qualifying School graduates
- 2000 PGA Tour Qualifying School graduates
- 2003 Nationwide Tour graduates
