= Turning Stone Resort Championship =

Golf tournament

Tournament information
- Location: Verona, New York
- Established: 2007
- Course: Atunyote Golf Club
- Par: 72
- Length: 7,482 yards (6,842 m)
- Tour: PGA Tour
- Format: Stroke play
- Prize fund: US$6,000,000
- Month played: August
- Final year: 2010

Tournament record score
- Aggregate: 270 Steve Flesch (2007)
- To par: −18 as above

Final champion
- (United States) Bill Lunde
- Location in the United States Location in New York

The Turning Stone Resort Championship was a PGA Tour professional golf tournament, first played from September 20–23, 2007. It was hosted by the Atunyote Golf Club at Turning Stone Resort & Casino in Verona, New York.

In 2007, it was the first of the seven Fall Series events played after the conclusion of the FedEx Cup, which was introduced the same year. The prize fund was $6 million. The tournament's timing in the PGA Tour calendar changed in 2008: The 2008 Fall Series began before the conclusion of the FedEx Cup with the Viking Classic. After the Fall Series took a week off for The Tour Championship, it resumed with the Turning Stone Championship. In 2009, the Turning Stone Resort Championship was played the week after The Tour Championship.

In 2010, the event moved to August and become part of the main PGA Tour season, although it was an "alternate" event scheduled opposite a World Golf Championships tournament, specifically the Bridgestone Invitational. It was dropped from the PGA Tour schedule in 2011 when event organizers and the Tour could not agree on a stand-alone date for the tournament.

John Rollins won the 2006 B.C. Open, which was held at the course, when En-Joie Golf Club (now the site of the Dick's Sporting Goods Open on the Champions Tour) was unavailable due to flooding.

== Winners ==
Year	Winner	Score	To par	Margin of victory	Runner-up	Winner's share ($)
2010	(United States) Bill Lunde	271	−17	1 stroke	(United States) J. J. Henry	720,000
2009	(United States) Matt Kuchar	271	−17	Playoff	(United States) Vaughn Taylor	1,080,000
2008	(United States) Dustin Johnson	279	−9	1 stroke	(Australia) Robert Allenby	1,080,000
2007	(United States) Steve Flesch	270	−18	2 strokes	(United States) Michael Allen	1,080,000
