= Running Horse Golf Championship =

Proposed PGA Tour golf tournament

The Running Horse Golf Championship was a proposed PGA Tour golf tournament. It was scheduled to be played for the first time on October 22–28, 2007, which would have made it the first PGA Tour event staged in central California since 1964.

The tournament was to be staged at Running Horse Golf & Country Club, a residential golf development in Fresno, California with a course co-designed by Jack Nicklaus and his son Jack Nicklaus II, which was under construction when the tournament was announced. However, in November 2006 it was reported that foreclosure proceedings on Running Horse had begun. The City of Fresno hoped that a buyer could be found and the tournament would go ahead. The PGA Tour also remained optimistic, and the tournament director stated that the tournament could be played at Running Horse if the course was seeded by March 2007. However a move to a new venue, which would entail a change of name, had not been ruled out.

By early June 2007 there was no real doubt that the tournament would not take place at Running Horse in 2007, and on June 14 the PGA Tour announced it had been removed from the schedule. PGA Tour Commissioner Tim Finchem stated, "Our intention... is for Fresno to be a part of the schedule again in 2008 and beyond."

A new tournament called the Ginn sur Mer Classic at Tesoro took the Running Horse slot in 2007 and 2008, after which it was also cancelled.

== Indictment ==
In August 2010, a former Carmel real estate broker, Thomas O'Meara, was arrested by the FBI and arraigned in federal court. O'Meara was indicted on 32 counts of conspiracy, wire and mail fraud in connection with the failed Running Horse development.

The indictment alleged:

- Based on representations made to them by O'Meara, Jack Nicklaus and members of the Nicklaus Design team appeared at a press conference in January 2006 at the proposed Running Horse golf course and, relying on O'Meara's representations, the PGA Tour publicly scheduled a PGA Tour event called "The Running Horse Classic" that was to have taken place in October 2007 with a purse of $4,500,000.
- O'Meara spent all money loaned to him by commercial investors and eventually defaulted on $10,000,000 in commercial loans, began marketing the Running Horse development as an investment opportunity, and solicited over $16,000,000 in private investor funds at a time when O'Meara knew, but failed to disclose, that the project was in poor financial condition and faced numerous, substantial obstacles to completion.
- O'Meara diverted some private investors' funds for his own personal gain.
- O'Meara and others acting on his behalf falsely stated that: the development had acquired all property necessary to complete the golf course and adjoining residential development; the golf course was close to completion; investors' principal was guaranteed and they would receive high rates of return on their investments; and, that Jack Nicklaus Design and the PGA Tour were confident that the golf course would be completed in time to host the Running Horse Classic in 2007.
- The Running Horse development ultimately failed, and commercial and private investors lost their investments.
- No residential units were ever built in the development, and the 450 acres (1.8 km^{2}) on which the Running Horse Golf and Country Club was to have been located remained largely undeveloped at the time of the indictment.
