= 2003 Nationwide Tour graduates =

This is a list of players who graduated from the Nationwide Tour in 2003. The top 20 players on the Nationwide Tour's money list in 2003 earned their PGA Tour card for 2004.

	2003 Nationwide Tour		2004 PGA Tour				
Player	Money list rank	Earnings ($)	Starts	Cuts made	Best finish	Money list rank	Earnings ($)
(United States) Zach Johnson*	1	494,882	30	24	Win	19	2,417,685
(United States) Joe Ogilvie	2	392,337	32	20	T2	49	1,443,363
(United States) Tom Carter*#	3	360,990	35	20	T13	158	395,780
(United States) Chris Couch	4	342,874	24	4	T10	217	100,283
(United States) Bo Van Pelt	5	289,248	30	23	T4 (twice)	39	1,553,825
(United States) Ryan Palmer*	6	286,066	33	18	Win	37	1,592,344
(Australia) Mark Hensby	7	276,519	29	19	Win	15	2,718,766
(United States) Tripp Isenhour	8	262,646	22	8	T37	218	90,699
(United States) Jason Bohn*	9	255,191	29	21	T6	131	567,930
(United States) Jason Dufner*	10	237,637	28	11	T8	164	317,770
(United States) Vaughn Taylor*	11	223,988	27	16	Win	67	1,176,434
(United States) Blaine McCallister	12	223,232	27	6	T20 (twice)	198	162,700
(Australia) Andre Stolz*	13	218,867	20	7	Win	101	808,373
(United States) Guy Boros	14	210,461	24	8	T18	208	130,783
(United States) Ted Purdy	15	206,584	35	22	2 (twice)	36	1,636,876
(United States) D. J. Brigman*	16	195,941	27	12	T11 (twice)	160	356,943
(United States) Lucas Glover*	17	193,989	30	17	T10 (twice)	134	557,454
(Canada) David Morland IV	18	190,284	27	9	T21	197	164,435
(United States) Craig Bowden	19	180,238	30	12	T9	143	494,568
(United States) Tommy Tolles	20	179,963	25	8	T13	201	151,852

*PGA Tour rookie for 2004.
#Carter received a battlefield promotion to the PGA Tour in 2003 by winning three tournaments on the Nationwide Tour in 2003. On the PGA Tour in 2003 he played eight tournaments, making two cuts with a best finish of T12.

T = Tied
Green background indicates the player retained his PGA Tour card for 2005 (won or finished inside the top 125).
Yellow background indicates the player did not retain his PGA Tour card for 2005, but retained conditional status (finished between 126–150).
Red background indicates the player did not retain his PGA Tour card for 2005 (finished outside the top 150).

== Winners on the PGA Tour in 2004 ==
No.	Date	Player	Tournament	Winning score	Margin of victory	Runner(s)-up
1	Apr 4	(United States) Zach Johnson	BellSouth Classic	−13 (69-66-68-72=275)	1 stroke	(Australia) Mark Hensby
2	Jul 11	(Australia) Mark Hensby	John Deere Classic	−16 (68-65-69-66=265)	Playoff	(England) John E. Morgan
3	Aug 22	(United States) Vaughn Taylor	Reno-Tahoe Open	−10 (67-67-69-75=278)	Playoff	(Australia) Stephen Allan, (United States) Hunter Mahan, (United States) Scott McCarron
4	Oct 10	(Australia) Andre Stolz	Michelin Championship at Las Vegas	−21 (67-67-65-67=267)	1 stroke	(United States) Harrison Frazar, (United States) Tom Lehman, (United States) Tag Ridings
5	Oct 24	(United States) Ryan Palmer	FUNAI Classic at the Walt Disney World Resort	−22 (68-68-68-62=266)	3 strokes	(United States) Briny Baird, (Fiji) Vijay Singh

== Runners-up on the PGA Tour in 2004 ==
No.	Date	Player	Tournament	Winner	Winning score	Runner-up score
1	Apr 4	(Australia) Mark Hensby	BellSouth Classic	(United States) Zach Johnson	−13 (69-66-68-72=275)	−12 (73-70-66-67=276)
2	Apr 18	(United States) Ted Purdy lost in two-man playoff	MCI Heritage	(United States) Stewart Cink	−10 (72-69-69-64=274)	−10 (69-67-65-73=274)
3	May 3	(United States) Joe Ogilvie	HP Classic of New Orleans	(Fiji) Vijay Singh	−22 (70-65-68-63=266)	−21 (66-67-66-68=267)
4	Jul 18	(United States) Ted Purdy (2)	B.C. Open	(United States) Jonathan Byrd	−20 (67-65-68-68=268)	−19 (69-67-65-68=269)
5	Oct 3	(United States) Ryan Palmer	Southern Farm Bureau Classic	(United States) Fred Funk	−22 (69-67-64-66=266)	−21 (69-68-66-64=267)

== See also ==
- 2003 PGA Tour Qualifying School graduates
