= Bill Lunde =

American professional golfer (born 1975)

Personal information
- Full name: William Jeremiah Lunde
- Nationality: United States
- Born: November 18, 1975 (age 50) San Diego, California, U.S.
- Height: 6 ft 1 in (1.85 m)
- Weight: 220 lb (100 kg; 16 st)

Career
- Sport: Golf
- College: University of Nevada, Las Vegas
- Turned professional: 1998
- Former tours: PGA Tour; Web.com Tour; NGA Hooters Tour; Gateway Tour
- Professional wins: 4

Number of wins by tour
- PGA Tour: 1
- Korn Ferry Tour: 1
- Other: 2

Best results in major championships
- Masters Tournament: DNP
- PGA Championship: T39: 2011
- U.S. Open: CUT: 2003, 2012
- The Open Championship: DNP

William Jeremiah Lunde (born November 18, 1975) is an American professional golfer who formerly played on the PGA Tour.

== Early life and amateur career ==
In 1975, Lunde was born in San Diego, California. He played at the University of Nevada, Las Vegas and was part of the 1998 team that won the NCAA Championship.

== Professional career ==
In 1998, Lunde turned professional.

Lunde played on the Nationwide Tour in 2004, 2005, and 2008. After two years in the Nationwide Tour, in 2005 Lunde gave up on the game and spent a year working in sales with the Las Vegas Founders, the group that ran the PGA Tour stop in Las Vegas, and then tried real estate.

Lunde got back into the game through the Butch Harmon Vegas Tour, where he earned a spot on the Nationwide Tour in 2008. During his 2008 season, he won the Nationwide Children's Hospital Invitational and finished fifth on the 2008 Nationwide Tour money list, thus earning his PGA Tour card for 2009. In 2010 he won his first PGA Tour event - the Turning Stone Resort Championship. Since his win, Lunde has alternated between the PGA Tour and Web.com Tour.

Lunde has also played on several mini-tours.

== Amateur wins ==
- 1998 Monroe Invitational

== Professional wins (4) ==
=== PGA Tour wins (1) ===
No.	Date	Tournament	Winning score	Margin of victory	Runner-up
1	Aug 8, 2010	Turning Stone Resort Championship	−17 (73-68-64-66=271)	1 stroke	(United States) J. J. Henry

=== Nationwide Tour wins (1) ===
No.	Date	Tournament	Winning score	Margin of victory	Runner-up
1	Jul 27, 2008	Nationwide Children's Hospital Invitational	−5 (67-72-67-73=279)	1 stroke	(United States) Dustin Bray

=== NGA Hooters Tour wins (1) ===
No.	Date	Tournament	Winning score	Margin of victory	Runners-up
1	Jun 2, 2002	Oakwood Classic	−19 (66-68-68-67=269)	4 strokes	(United States) Ty Armstrong, (United States) Josh Broadaway, (United States) Stephen Ubernosky

=== Gateway Tour wins (1) ===
No.	Date	Tournament	Winning score	Margin of victory	Runners-up
1	Jun 26, 2003	HDLS Classic	−8 (72-66-70=208)	Playoff	(United States) Marcus Jones, (United States) Rob Rashell

== Results in major championships ==
Tournament	2003	2004	2005	2006	2007	2008	2009	2010	2011	2012
U.S. Open	CUT									CUT
PGA Championship								CUT	T39	

Did not play

CUT = missed the half-way cut
"T" = tied
Note: Lunde never played in the Masters Tournament or The Open Championship.

== Results in The Players Championship ==
Tournament	2010	2011
The Players Championship	CUT	CUT

CUT = missed the halfway cut

== Results in World Golf Championships ==
Tournament	2010
Match Play	
Championship	
Invitational	
Champions	T69

Did not play

"T" = Tied

== See also ==
- 2008 Nationwide Tour graduates
- 2014 Web.com Tour Finals graduates
