= George McNeill (golfer) =

American professional golfer (born 1975)

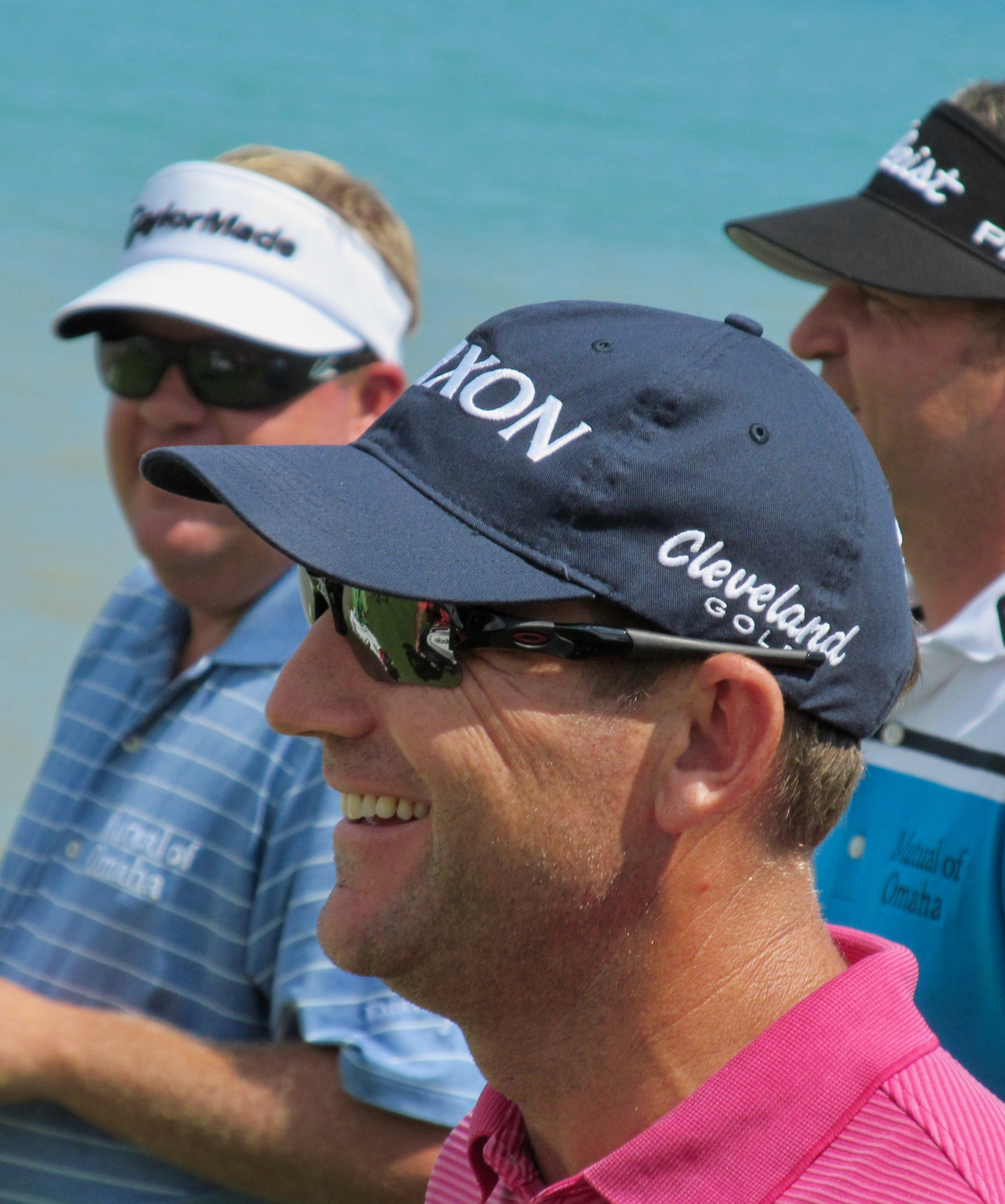
- McNeill at the 2015 PGA Championship

Personal information
- Full name: George William McNeill Jr.
- Nationality: United States
- Born: October 2, 1975 (age 51) Naples, Florida, U.S.
- Height: 6 ft 1 in (1.85 m)
- Weight: 180 lb (82 kg; 13 st)

Career
- Sport: Golf
- College: Florida State University
- Turned professional: 1998
- Current tours: PGA Tour (past champion status); Web.com Tour
- Professional wins: 6
- Highest ranking: 67 (March 9, 2008)

Number of wins by tour
- PGA Tour: 2
- Other: 4

Best results in major championships
- Masters Tournament: DNP
- PGA Championship: T62: 2012
- U.S. Open: 63rd: 2007
- The Open Championship: CUT: 2010, 2014

George William McNeill Jr. (born October 2, 1975) is an American professional golfer. He is a two-time winner on the PGA Tour with victories at the 2007 Frys.com Open and the 2012 Puerto Rico Open.

== Early life ==
McNeill was born and raised in Naples, Florida. He attended North Fort Myers High School and graduated in 1993. He then attended Florida State University, where he was a member of the golf team. He was an All-ACC and All-America selection in 1997 and 1998.

== Professional career ==
In 1998, McNeill turned professional. His early career was erratic. McNeill was a member of the Nationwide Tour in 2003 but did not retain his card. In 2004, he played on the Golden Bear Tour and he only played in one Nationwide Tour event. In 2005, he played several mini-tour events and tried to Monday qualify for several Nationwide and PGA Tour events, but was unsuccessful. In late 2005, he took a break from professional golf and worked as an assistant professional at the Shadow Wood and Forest Country Clubs in Fort Myers, Florida for six months.

In June 2006, he returned to professional golf by qualifying for the 2006 U.S. Open. He followed the U.S. Open with two Nationwide event starts, making one cut. Later in December 2006, he was medalist at the PGA Tour Qualifying Tournament. By doing so, he won $50,000 and received his PGA Tour card for 2007. As a rookie on the PGA Tour in 2007, he qualified for the FedEx Cup. He played in two FedEx Cup events before missing the points cut for the third event. He won his first PGA Tour event during the Fall Series at the Frys.com Open in October. McNeill won the 2012 Puerto Rico Open for his second PGA Tour victory. Tied for the lead with Ryo Ishikawa with three holes to play, McNeill finished with three birdies for a two-shot win. He finished runner-up to Ángel Cabrera in the 2014 Greenbrier Classic after shooting a 9-under-par 61 in the final round. He finished the tournament with a score of 14-under to Cabrera's 16-under. He found out after the tournament that his older sister had died of cancer earlier that day.

== Amateur wins ==
- 1997 Tennessee Tournament of Champions

== Professional wins (6) ==
=== PGA Tour wins (2) ===
No.	Date	Tournament	Winning score	Margin of victory	Runner-up
1	Oct 14, 2007	Frys.com Open	−23 (66-64-67-67=264)	4 strokes	(United States) D. J. Trahan
2	Mar 11, 2012	Puerto Rico Open	−16 (66-70-67-69=272)	2 strokes	(Japan) Ryo Ishikawa

PGA Tour playoff record (0–2)

No.	Year	Tournament	Opponents	Result
1	2009	Justin Timberlake Shriners Hospitals for Children Open	(United States) Chad Campbell, (Scotland) Martin Laird	Laird won with birdie on third extra hole Campbell eliminated by par on second hole
2	2009	Children's Miracle Network Classic	(Canada) Stephen Ames, (United States) Justin Leonard	Ames won with par on second extra hole Leonard eliminated by par on first hole

=== Other wins (4) ===
- 1999 Citronelle Classic (Emerald Coast Tour)
- 2001 Waterloo Open Golf Classic
- 2002 Beck's Open (Fort Myers)
- 2008 Coors Light Open (Fort Myers)

== Results in major championships ==
Tournament	2002	2003	2004	2005	2006	2007	2008	2009
Masters Tournament								
U.S. Open	CUT				CUT	63		CUT
The Open Championship								
PGA Championship							CUT	

Tournament	2010	2011	2012	2013	2014	2015
Masters Tournament						
U.S. Open						CUT
The Open Championship	CUT				CUT	
PGA Championship	CUT		T62		CUT	CUT

Did not play

CUT = missed the half-way cut
"T" = tied

== See also ==
- 2006 PGA Tour Qualifying School graduates
- List of Florida State Seminoles men's golfers
