= Tour Championship =

Professional golf tournament

Coordinates: 33.743°N 84.303°W

Tournament information
- Location: Atlanta, Georgia
- Established: 1987
- Course: East Lake Golf Club
- Par: 71
- Length: 7,346 yards (6,717 m)
- Tour: PGA Tour
- Format: Stroke play
- Prize fund: $40,000,000
- Month played: August
- Website: tourchampionship.com

Tournament record score
- Aggregate: 257 Tiger Woods (2007)
- To par: −23 as above

Current champion
- (United States) Scottie Scheffler

Location map
- Location in the United States Location in Georgia

The Tour Championship (stylized as the TOUR Championship) is a golf tournament that is part of the PGA Tour. It has historically been one of the final events of the PGA Tour season; prior to 2007, its field consisted exclusively of the top 30 money leaders of the past PGA Tour season.

Starting in 2007, it was the final event of the four-tournament FedEx Cup Playoffs, with eligibility determined by FedEx Cup points accumulated throughout the season. From 2019 onward, the FedEx Cup was reduced to three events, and the Tour Championship is now held in late August rather than mid-September.

While originally followed by the PGA Tour Fall Series (for those competing for qualifying exemptions in the following season), a re-alignment of the PGA Tour's season schedule in 2013 made the Tour Championship the final event of the season.

From 1987 to 1996, several courses hosted the event. Beginning in 1997, the event alternated between Champions Golf Club in Houston and East Lake Golf Club in Atlanta; since 2004, East Lake has been the event's permanent home. The PGA Tour announced in June 2026 that the Tour Championship would take on a revised format from 2028, and would rotate venues annually with East Lake included in the rotation.

== Format ==
=== 1987–2006 ===
From its debut in 1987 through 2006, the top 30 money winners on the PGA Tour after the penultimate event qualified for the event. It took place in early November, the week after the comparable event in Europe, the Volvo Masters, which allowed players who are members of both the PGA Tour and the European Tour to play in both end of season events. After the Tour Championship, the money list for the season was finalized. There were a number of additional events between the Tour Championship and Christmas which were recognized by the PGA Tour, but prize money won in them was unofficial. Also, because this tournament's field was not as large as other golf tournaments, there was no 36-hole cut; all players who started the event were credited with making the cut and received some prize money.

=== 2007–2018 ===
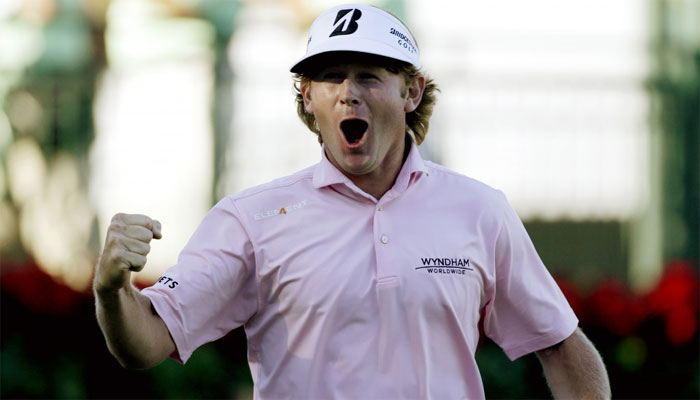
Brandt Snedeker winning in 2012

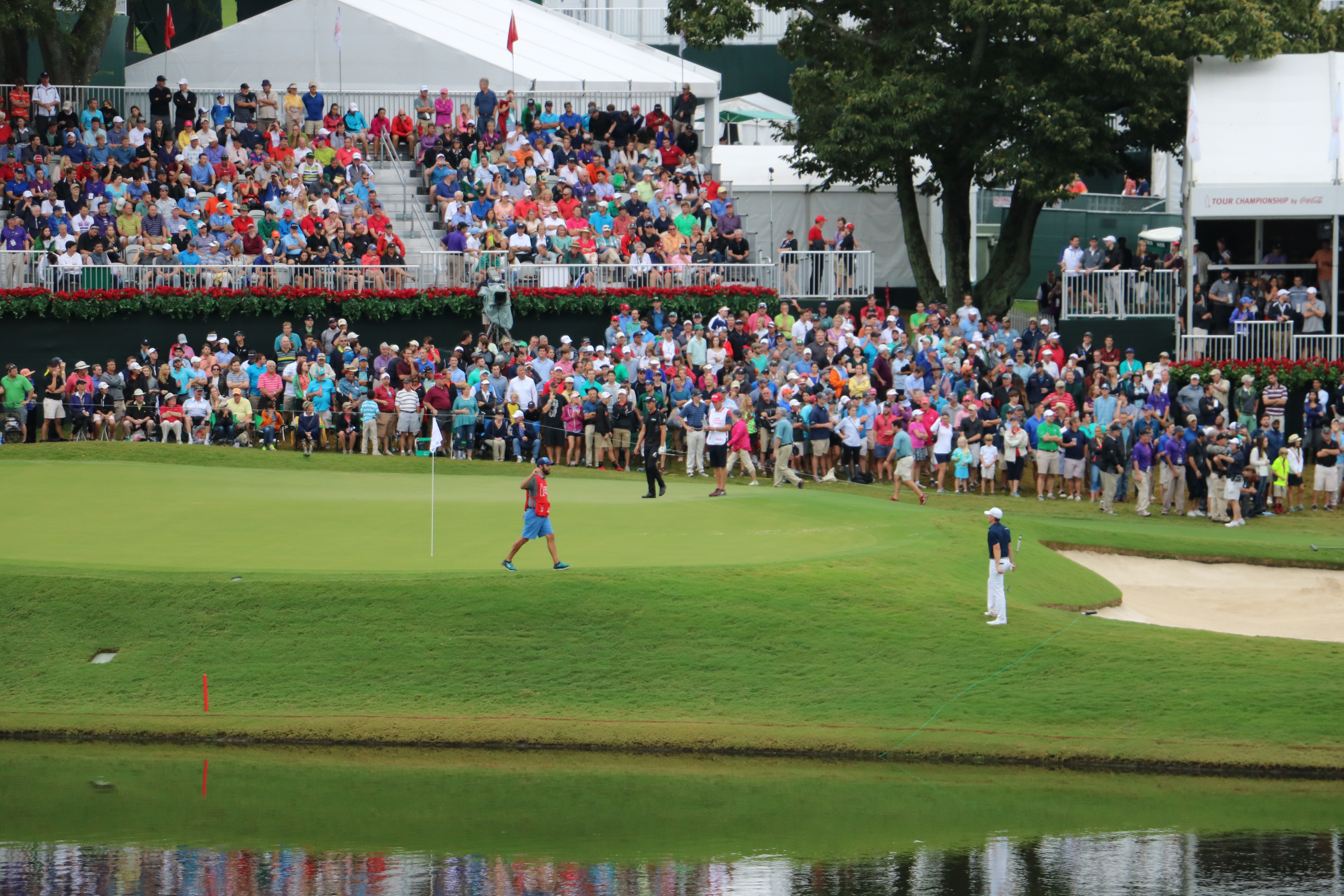
Jordan Spieth and Henrik Stenson on the 17th green in 2015

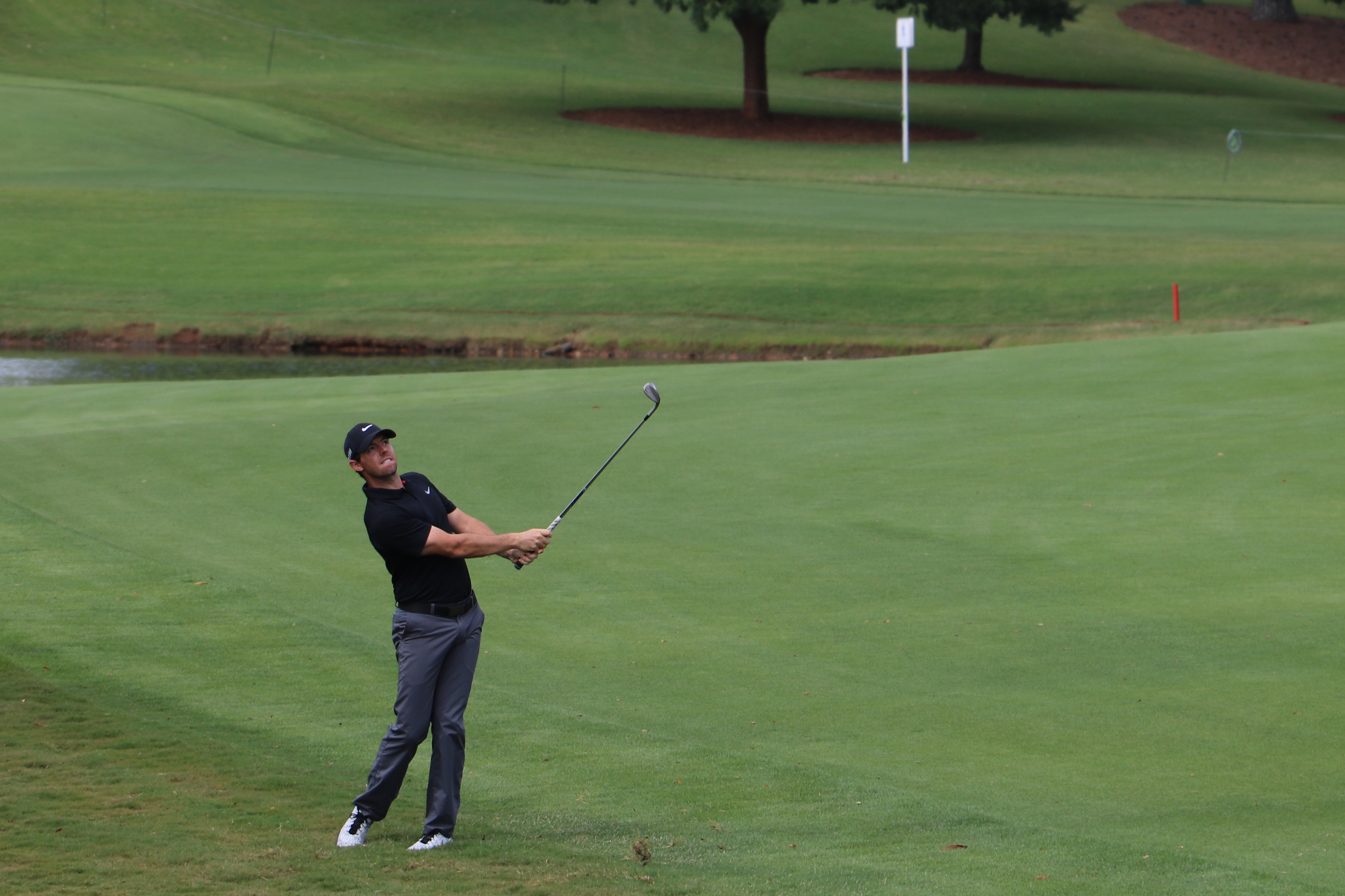
Rory McIlroy during practice rounds in 2015

In 2007, the Tour Championship moved from November to mid-September, where it ended the four-tournament FedEx Cup Playoffs. As in past years, 30 players qualified for the event, but the basis for qualification was no longer prize money. Instead, FedEx Cup points accumulated during the regular PGA Tour season and then during the three preceding playoff events determined the participants. Beginning in 2009, the assignment and awarding of points assured that if any of the top five FedEx Cup point leaders entering The Tour Championship won the event, that player would also win the FedEx Cup. Therefore, it still remained possible for one player to win the Tour Championship and another player to win the FedEx Cup. For example, Tiger Woods won the 2018 Tour Championship but finished second in the FedEx Cup, while Justin Rose won the FedEx Cup despite finishing the tournament tied for fourth, because Woods entered the Tour Championship 20th in overall points while Rose was 2nd.

2007 was also the inaugural year for the Tour's Fall Series, which determined the rest of the top 125 players eligible for the following year's FedEx Cup, which made the event no longer the final tournament of the season. However, starting in 2013, the Tour Championship was the final tournament of the PGA Tour season; seasons begin in October of the previous calendar year. Since 2007, those who qualified for the Tour Championship earned a Masters Tournament invitation. For 2020, players who qualified for the Tour Championship were invited to the Sentry Tournament of Champions, a byproduct of tournament cancellations from the coronavirus pandemic.

Prior to 2016, hole 18 at East Lake Golf Club was a par 3, which had been criticized as lacking drama for fans. Starting in 2016, the PGA Tour reversed the nines at East Lake for the Tour Championship so that play now finishes on a more exciting par 5 hole.

=== 2019–2024 ===
Beginning in 2019, the tournament adopted a new format in order to ensure that the winner would also be the FedEx Cup champion. Using a method similar to the Gundersen method in Nordic combined, the player with the most FedEx Cup points leading into the tournament starts at 10 under par. The player with the second most points starts at −8, the third at −7, the fourth at -6, and the fifth at −5. Players ranked 6 through 10 begin at −4; 11 through 15 at −3; and so on, down to numbers 26 to 30 who will start at even par.

For purposes of the Official World Golf Ranking only aggregate scores are taken into account, disregarding any starting scores in relation to par.

=== 2025–present ===
In May 2025, it was announced that the Tour Championship would abandon the starting strokes format. All players in the tournament field begin at even-par and the winner of the FedEx Cup is the lowest scoring player after four rounds. The event will also carry a purse of $40 million, with $10 million going to the winner, and will count as official money for the first time since 2018.

== Calamity Jane trophy ==
The Calamity Jane trophy is a sterling silver replica of Bobby Jones's original "Calamity Jane" putter, that has been presented to the winner of the Tour Championship since 2005. In 2017, it was made the official trophy for the tournament. Each winner before 2005 has been awarded one retroactively.

== Winner's exemption reward ==
From 1998 to 2018, the Tour Championship winner, if not already exempt by other means, received a 3-year PGA Tour exemption. Since 2019, the Tour Championship winner has been directly awarded the FedEx Cup and a 5-year PGA Tour exemption.

== Tournament hosts ==
Years	Venue	Location
1998, 2000, 2002, 2004–present	East Lake Golf Club	Atlanta, Georgia
1990, 1997, 1999, 2001, 2003	Champions Golf Club, Cypress Creek Course	Houston, Texas
1995–96	Southern Hills Country Club	Tulsa, Oklahoma
1993–94	The Olympic Club, Lake Course	San Francisco, California
1991–92	Pinehurst Resort, No. 2 Course	Pinehurst, North Carolina
1989	Harbour Town Golf Links	Hilton Head Island, South Carolina
1988	Pebble Beach Golf Links	Pebble Beach, California
1987	Oak Hills Country Club	San Antonio, Texas

== Winners ==
Year	Winner	Score	To par	Margin of victory	Runner(s)-up	Purse ($)	Winner's share ($)
Tour Championship
2026	(United States) Scottie Scheffler (2)	264	−16	3 strokes	(Norway) Viktor Hovland	40,000,000	10,000,000
2025	(England) Tommy Fleetwood	262	−18	3 strokes	(United States) Patrick Cantlay (United States) Russell Henley	40,000,000	10,000,000

Year	Winner	To par (Note: From 2019–2024, players were allocated a starting score (relative to par) based on their position in the FedEx Cup standings. This is shown in parentheses.)	Margin of victory	Runner(s)-up	Lowest gross (Note: With the change of format in 2019, OWGR points have been awarded based on the lowest total strokes for the tournament rather than the winning score relative to par.)	
Tour Championship
2024	(United States) Scottie Scheffler	−30 (−10)	4 strokes	(United States) Collin Morikawa	(United States) Collin Morikawa	262
2023	(Norway) Viktor Hovland	−27 (−8)	5 strokes	(United States) Xander Schauffele	(Norway) Viktor Hovland (United States) Xander Schauffele	261
2022	(Northern Ireland) Rory McIlroy (3)	−21 (−4)	1 stroke	(South Korea) Im Sung-jae (United States) Scottie Scheffler	(Northern Ireland) Rory McIlroy	263
2021	(United States) Patrick Cantlay	−21 (−10)	1 stroke	(Spain) Jon Rahm	(United States) Kevin Na (Spain) Jon Rahm	266
2020	(United States) Dustin Johnson	−21 (−10)	3 strokes	(United States) Xander Schauffele (United States) Justin Thomas	(United States) Xander Schauffele	265
2019	(Northern Ireland) Rory McIlroy (2)	−18 (−5)	4 strokes	(United States) Xander Schauffele	(Northern Ireland) Rory McIlroy	267

Year	Winner	Score	To par	Margin of victory	Runner(s)-up	Purse ($) (Note: From 1987–2018 the Tour Championship had its own purse. From 2019–2024, the tournament did not have its own prize fund, with prize money being distributed from the FedEx Cup bonus pool.)	Winner's share ($)
Tour Championship
2018	(United States) Tiger Woods (3)	269	−11	2 strokes	(United States) Billy Horschel	9,000,000	1,620,000
2017	(United States) Xander Schauffele	268	−12	1 stroke	(United States) Justin Thomas	8,750,000	1,575,000
2016	(Northern Ireland) Rory McIlroy	268	−12	Playoff	(United States) Kevin Chappell (United States) Ryan Moore	8,500,000	1,530,000
2015	(United States) Jordan Spieth	271	−9	4 strokes	(New Zealand) Danny Lee (England) Justin Rose (Sweden) Henrik Stenson	8,250,000	1,485,000
2014	(United States) Billy Horschel	269	−11	3 strokes	(United States) Jim Furyk (Northern Ireland) Rory McIlroy	8,000,000	1,440,000
2013	(Sweden) Henrik Stenson	267	−13	3 strokes	(United States) Jordan Spieth (United States) Steve Stricker	8,000,000	1,440,000
2012	(United States) Brandt Snedeker	270	−10	3 strokes	(England) Justin Rose	8,000,000	1,440,000
2011	(United States) Bill Haas	272	−8	Playoff	(United States) Hunter Mahan	8,000,000	1,440,000
The Tour Championship
2010	(United States) Jim Furyk	272	−8	1 stroke	(England) Luke Donald	7,500,000	1,350,000
2009	(United States) Phil Mickelson (2)	271	−9	3 strokes	(United States) Tiger Woods	7,500,000	1,350,000
2008	(Colombia) Camilo Villegas	273	−7	Playoff	(Spain) Sergio García	7,000,000	1,260,000
2007	(United States) Tiger Woods (2)	257	−23	8 strokes	(United States) Mark Calcavecchia (United States) Zach Johnson	7,000,000	1,260,000
2006	(Australia) Adam Scott	269	−11	3 strokes	(United States) Jim Furyk	6,500,000	1,170,000
2005	(United States) Bart Bryant	263	−17	6 strokes	(United States) Tiger Woods	6,500,000	1,170,000
2004	(South Africa) Retief Goosen	269	−11	4 strokes	(United States) Tiger Woods	6,000,000	1,080,000
2003	(United States) Chad Campbell	268	−16	3 strokes	(United States) Charles Howell III	6,000,000	1,080,000
2002	(Fiji) Vijay Singh	268	−12	2 strokes	(United States) Charles Howell III	5,000,000	900,000
2001	(Canada) Mike Weir	270	−14	Playoff	(Spain) Sergio García (South Africa) Ernie Els (United States) David Toms	5,000,000	900,000
2000	(United States) Phil Mickelson	267	−13	2 strokes	(United States) Tiger Woods	5,000,000	900,000
1999	(United States) Tiger Woods	269	−15	4 strokes	(United States) Davis Love III	5,000,000	900,000
1998	(United States) Hal Sutton	274	−6	Playoff	(Fiji) Vijay Singh	4,000,000	720,000
1997	(United States) David Duval	273	−11	1 stroke	(United States) Jim Furyk	4,000,000	720,000
1996	(United States) Tom Lehman	268	−12	6 strokes	(United States) Brad Faxon	3,000,000	540,000
1995	(United States) Billy Mayfair	280	E	3 strokes	(Australia) Steve Elkington (United States) Corey Pavin	3,000,000	540,000
1994	(United States) Mark McCumber	274	−10	Playoff	(United States) Fuzzy Zoeller	3,000,000	540,000
1993	(United States) Jim Gallagher Jr.	277	−7	1 stroke	(South Africa) David Frost (United States) John Huston (Australia) Greg Norman (United States) Scott Simpson	3,000,000	540,000
1992	(United States) Paul Azinger	276	−8	3 strokes	(United States) Lee Janzen (United States) Corey Pavin	2,000,000	360,000
1991	(United States) Craig Stadler	279	−5	Playoff	(United States) Russ Cochran	2,000,000	360,000
Nabisco Championship
1990	(United States) Jodie Mudd	273	−11	Playoff	(United States) Billy Mayfair	2,500,000	450,000
1989	(United States) Tom Kite	276	−8	Playoff	(United States) Payne Stewart	2,500,000	450,000
1988	(United States) Curtis Strange	279	−9	Playoff	(United States) Tom Kite	2,000,000	360,000
1987	(United States) Tom Watson	268	−12	2 strokes	(United States) Chip Beck	2,000,000	360,000
