= Vaughn Taylor (golfer) =

American professional golfer (born 1976)

Personal information
- Full name: Vaughn Joseph Taylor
- Nationality: United States
- Born: March 9, 1976 (age 50) Roanoke, Virginia, U.S.
- Height: 6 ft 0 in (1.83 m)
- Weight: 160 lb (73 kg; 11 st)
- Spouse: Leot Taylor
- Children: 2

Career
- Sport: Golf
- College: Augusta State University
- Turned professional: 1999
- Current tour: PGA Tour
- Former tours: Web.com Tour; NGA Hooters Tour
- Professional wins: 9
- Highest ranking: 37 (April 15, 2007)

Number of wins by tour
- PGA Tour: 3
- Korn Ferry Tour: 1
- PGA Tour Champions: 1
- Other: 4

Best results in major championships
- Masters Tournament: T10: 2007
- PGA Championship: T28: 2005
- U.S. Open: CUT: 1998, 2007
- The Open Championship: T66: 2006

Vaughn Joseph Taylor (born March 9, 1976) is an American professional golfer who has played on the PGA Tour and Web.com Tour.

== Early life ==
Taylor was born in Roanoke, Virginia. He was raised in Augusta, Georgia from infancy. He attended Hephzibah High School. Taylor played golf for Augusta State University where he was an honorable mention All-American his senior season.

== Professional career ==
In 1999, Taylor turned professional. He played his early years on the Hooters and Nationwide Tours, getting valuable experience before playing his first full year with a PGA Tour card in 2004. He won four times on the NGA Hooters Tour, and once on the Nationwide Tour at the Knoxville Open. Taylor has three victories to his name on the PGA Tour; his first two victories coming in consecutive years at the Reno-Tahoe Open, an alternate event, in 2004 and 2005. His victory in 2004 was one of five wins by rookies that year and came after holing an 11-foot birdie on the first extra hole during a four-man sudden-death playoff. He had also previously had to sink a 14-foot birdie putt on the final hole of regulation play to make it into the playoff. In 2005, he led the event wire-to-wire and held a six-stroke advantage entering the final round, to claim a comfortable victory by three strokes from Jonathan Kaye.

After a year that included a career high six top-10s, Taylor qualified to play on the U.S. Ryder Cup team for the first time in 2006. He earned a half point for his team with a record of 0–1–1.

Taylor's highest world ranking was 37th in 2007 and career high in the FedEx Cup placing was 35th in 2010.

Taylor started the 2015–16 season playing on both the PGA Tour and Web.com Tour, having only past champion status on the PGA Tour after finishing 151st in the FedEx Cup, just a fraction of a point from conditional status. He made two starts on the PGA Tour before making two starts on the Web.com Tour, where he missed the cut in Panama and withdrew due to illness in Colombia. In February 2016, Taylor won the AT&T Pebble Beach Pro-Am, his first PGA Tour win since August 2005. He started the week as first alternate, only earning entry after Carl Pettersson withdrew, and had not been fully exempt since 2012. The win was also Taylor's first at a non-alternate event and moved him from 447th in the world to 100th.

== Personal life ==
Taylor lives in the Augusta, Georgia.

== Professional wins (9) ==
=== PGA Tour wins (3) ===
| No. | Date | Tournament | Winning score | Margin of victory | Runner(s)-up |
|---|---|---|---|---|---|
| 1 | Aug 22, 2004 | Reno–Tahoe Open | −10 (67-67-69-75=278) | Playoff | (Australia) Stephen Allan, (United States) Hunter Mahan, (United States) Scott McCarron |
| 2 | Aug 21, 2005 | Reno–Tahoe Open (2) | −21 (64-67-64-72=267) | 3 strokes | (United States) Jonathan Kaye |
| 3 | Feb 14, 2016 | AT&T Pebble Beach Pro-Am | −17 (70-68-67-65=270) | 1 stroke | (United States) Phil Mickelson |

PGA Tour playoff record (1–2)

| No. | Year | Tournament | Opponent(s) | Result |
|---|---|---|---|---|
| 1 | 2004 | Reno–Tahoe Open | (Australia) Stephen Allan, (United States) Hunter Mahan, (United States) Scott McCarron | Won with birdie on first extra hole |
| 2 | 2009 | Turning Stone Resort Championship | (United States) Matt Kuchar | Lost to par on sixth extra hole |
| 3 | 2010 | Shell Houston Open | (United States) Anthony Kim | Lost to par on first extra hole |

=== Nationwide Tour wins (1) ===
| No. | Date | Tournament | Winning score | Margin of victory | Runner-up |
|---|---|---|---|---|---|
| 1 | Jun 29, 2003 | Knoxville Open | −20 (68-69-67-64=268) | Playoff | (United States) Joe Ogilvie |

Nationwide Tour playoff record (1–0)

| No. | Year | Tournament | Opponent | Result |
|---|---|---|---|---|
| 1 | 2003 | Knoxville Open | (United States) Joe Ogilvie | Won with birdie on first extra hole |

=== NGA Hooters Tour wins (4) ===
| No. | Date | Tournament | Winning score | Margin of victory | Runner(s)-up |
|---|---|---|---|---|---|
| 1 | Aug 8, 1999 | Hooters Classic (Echo Farms) | −16 (68-66-66-72=272) | 2 strokes | (United States) Jason Buha, (United States) John Kimbell |
| 2 | Feb 18, 2001 | NGA Meadow Brook Golf Classic | −21 (63-69-64-63=259) | 6 strokes | (United States) Greg Gregory, (United States) Zoran Zorkic |
| 3 | Apr 8, 2001 | Triad Classic | −22 (66-65-65-66=262) | 1 stroke | (United States) Eric Epperson |
| 4 | Mar 16, 2003 | Southern Hills Classic | −28 (67-68-62-63=260) | 6 strokes | (United States) Joe Meade |

=== PGA Tour Champions wins (1) ===
| No. | Date | Tournament | Winning score | Margin of victory | Runner-up |
|---|---|---|---|---|---|
| 1 | Oct 11, 2026 | Constellation Furyk and Friends | −17 (65-66-68=199) | Playoff | (Germany) Alex Čejka |

PGA Tour Champions playoff record (1–0)

| No. | Year | Tournament | Opponent | Result |
|---|---|---|---|---|
| 1 | 2026 | Constellation Furyk and Friends | (Germany) Alex Čejka | Won with birdie on second extra hole |

== Results in major championships ==
| Tournament | 1998 | 1999 |
|---|---|---|
| Masters Tournament | | |
| U.S. Open | CUT | |
| The Open Championship | | |
| PGA Championship | | |

| Tournament | 2000 | 2001 | 2002 | 2003 | 2004 | 2005 | 2006 | 2007 | 2008 | 2009 |
|---|---|---|---|---|---|---|---|---|---|---|
| Masters Tournament | | | | | | | CUT | T10 | CUT | |
| U.S. Open | | | | | | | | CUT | | |
| The Open Championship | | | | | | | T66 | CUT | | |
| PGA Championship | | | | | | T28 | CUT | CUT | CUT | |

| Tournament | 2010 | 2011 | 2012 | 2013 | 2014 | 2015 | 2016 |
|---|---|---|---|---|---|---|---|
| Masters Tournament | | | | | | | CUT |
| U.S. Open | | | | | | | |
| The Open Championship | | | | | | | |
| PGA Championship | CUT | | | | | | T33 |

Top 10
Did not play

CUT = missed the half way cut
"T" indicates a tie for a place.

=== Summary ===
| Tournament | Wins | 2nd | 3rd | Top-5 | Top-10 | Top-25 | Events | Cuts made |
|---|---|---|---|---|---|---|---|---|
| Masters Tournament | 0 | 0 | 0 | 0 | 1 | 1 | 4 | 1 |
| U.S. Open | 0 | 0 | 0 | 0 | 0 | 0 | 2 | 0 |
| The Open Championship | 0 | 0 | 0 | 0 | 0 | 0 | 2 | 1 |
| PGA Championship | 0 | 0 | 0 | 0 | 0 | 0 | 6 | 2 |
| Totals | 0 | 0 | 0 | 0 | 1 | 1 | 14 | 4 |

- Most consecutive cuts made – 1 (four times, current)
- Longest streak of top-10s – 1

== Results in The Players Championship ==
| Tournament | 2005 | 2006 | 2007 | 2008 | 2009 | 2010 | 2011 | 2012 | 2013 | 2014 | 2015 | 2016 | 2017 | 2018 | 2019 | 2020 | 2021 |
|---|---|---|---|---|---|---|---|---|---|---|---|---|---|---|---|---|---|
| The Players Championship | T32 | T8 | CUT | CUT | CUT | CUT | CUT | | | | | CUT | CUT | CUT | T41 | C | CUT |

Top 10
Did not play

CUT = missed the halfway cut
"T" indicates a tie for a place
C = Canceled after the first round due to the COVID-19 pandemic

== Results in World Golf Championships ==
Results not in chronological order prior to 2015.

| Tournament | 2005 | 2006 | 2007 | 2008 | 2009 | 2010 | 2011 | 2012 | 2013 | 2014 | 2015 | 2016 |
|---|---|---|---|---|---|---|---|---|---|---|---|---|
| Championship | T32 | | | | | | | | | | | |
| Match Play | | | | | | | | | | | | |
| Invitational | | T18 | T61 | T27 | | | | | | | | T38 |
| Champions | | | | | | | | | | | | |

Did not play

"T" = tied
Note that the HSBC Champions did not become a WGC event until 2009.

== U.S. national team appearances ==
- Ryder Cup: 2006

== See also ==
- 2003 Nationwide Tour graduates
- 2011 PGA Tour Qualifying School graduates
