= PGA Tour Fall Series =

Golfing event

The PGA Tour Fall Series was the name of the events on the PGA Tour that covered the end of the calendar year from 2007 to 2012 after the Tour Championship. Beginning in 2013, these events became part of the PGA Tour season, which from that point began to overlap two calendar years, beginning with the 2013–14 PGA Tour season.

This series was created in 2007 as part of the reorganization of the entire tour schedule. The new structure included a regular season and the FedEx Cup playoffs, which determine the season champion. This slate of tournaments had the working title "Quest for the Card" before the PGA Tour finalized the name.

The Fall Series began as a group of seven events (eventually reduced to four at the time of the calendar change) that determined who joined the 30 FedEx Cup finalists in receiving full-season exemptions to the following year's tournaments. These were the golfers who did not qualify for the FedEx Cup finals, but finished in the top 125 on the money list at the end of the Fall Series. Golfers finishing outside the top 125 could only enter the following year's tournaments based on other exemptions or through qualifying, e.g. "Q-school."

The winner of each Fall Series event, as in the case of all other PGA Tour events, received an exemption for the remainder of that season and the entirety of the following two seasons, and also received an automatic invitation to the following year's PGA Championship. However, winners of Fall Series tournaments did not receive automatic invitations to the following year's Masters, as these were given only to winners of tournaments that offer a full FedEx Cup points allocation.

In 2007, the Fall Series began the week after the final FedEx Cup event, The Tour Championship. In 2008, the first event took place the week before The Tour Championship. The Fall Series then took a week off before resuming with its final six events.

In March 2012, the PGA Tour announced substantial changes to its schedule and qualifying process. Starting with the 2014 season, the PGA Tour season would begin in October of the previous calendar year. As a result, the Fall Series tournaments would become part of the regular season. At the time these changes were announced, it had not been determined whether Fall Series events would receive full FedEx Cup points. Fry's, currently the title sponsor of a Fall Series event, notified the PGA Tour that it had "concern" about continuing the sponsorship if the events did not receive full points. In June of that year, the PGA Tour announced that the former Fall Series events would receive full points.

In 2023, the PGA Tour reverted to a calendar-based schedule, with the fall tournaments (now known as the FedEx Cup Fall) once again forming the conclusion of the season. Since FedEx Cup points rather than the money list are now used to determine the exempt top 125, the fall events will continue to award points despite being held after the playoffs; as a result, winners will receive Masters invitations (this was discontinued in 2026).

== Tournaments ==
Major changes came to the Fall Series schedule in 2009:

- The Fall Series was once again scheduled to start after The Tour Championship.
- The Valero Texas Open left the Fall Series, moving to mid-May.
- The Ginn sur Mer Classic was completely dropped from the schedule.
- The Viking Classic moved from September to the date vacated by the Ginn.
- Although the HSBC Champions is not a Fall Series event, its elevation to World Golf Championships (WGC) status also affected the scheduling of the Fall Series.

In that year, the Fall Series began with the Turning Stone Resort Championship, and then took a week off for the year's major team event, the Presidents Cup. It was intended to continue with three more events leading into the HSBC Champions, but the Viking Classic was canceled when several weeks of nearly continuous rain made the course unplayable. The Fall Series then took off for the HSBC Champions before ending with the Children's Miracle Network Classic.

The 2010 Fall Series schedule saw one change from previous years before it was announced. The Turning Stone Resort Championship moved to August, becoming an alternate event opposite another WGC event, the Bridgestone Invitational. This left four Fall Series events, but the gap was filled by a new event, the McGladrey Classic.

In 2011, the Viking Classic, moved to July and became an alternate event to The Open Championship, leaving four events. That tournament, now sponsored by Sanderson Farms, returned to the Fall Schedule in 2014 for the 2015 season and dropped its alternate event status for the 2019 tournament.

As of the 2020 PGA Tour schedule (starts in September 2019), the Mississippi, Las Vegas, Northern California, and Sea Island tournaments are still in their late-season slots, with the priority increasing because of FedEx Cup points.

Tournament	Location	Years	Note
Viking Classic	Madison, Mississippi	2007–2010	moved to July in 2011; returned to Fall in wraparound calendar in 2014.
Valero Texas Open	San Antonio, Texas	2007–2008	moved to May in 2009
Justin Timberlake Shriners Hospitals for Children Open	Las Vegas, Nevada	2007– (remains on wraparound)	
Frys.com Open	San Martin, California	2007– (remains in wraparound)	
Ginn sur Mer Classic	Port St. Lucie, Florida	2007–2008	discontinued after 2008
Children's Miracle Network Classic	Lake Buena Vista, Florida	2007–2012	
Turning Stone Resort Championship	Verona, New York	2007–2009	moved to August in 2010
McGladrey Classic	Sea Island, Georgia	2010- (remains in wraparound)	

== Television and radio ==
Every round of all Fall Series events was televised on Golf Channel and broadcast via satellite radio on Sirius XM Satellite Radio channel 146.
