= FedEx Cup =

Championship trophy for the PGA Tour

- Current season, competition or edition: 2026 FedEx Cup Playoffs
- Sport: Golf
- Founded: 2007
- Country: Based in the United States
- Most recent champion: (United States) Scottie Scheffler
- Most titles: (Northern Ireland) Rory McIlroy (3)
- Broadcasters: CBS Sports; NBC Sports/Golf Channel
- Website: www.pgatour.com/fedexcup.html

The FedEx Cup is the championship trophy for the PGA Tour. Its introduction in 2007 marked the first time that men's professional golf had a playoff system. Since its inception, the competition has been sponsored by FedEx.

The FedEx Cup is a season-long competition. Points are awarded based on finishing position in all PGA Tour–sanctioned tournaments. The leading points earners throughout the regular season qualify for the playoffs. Players are further eliminated after each of the first two playoff events, with the leading 30 points earners qualifying for the Tour Championship.

Scottie Scheffler is the current champion after he won his second career Tour Championship in 2026.

Rory McIlroy has the most titles with three. The only other players to win multiple FedEx Cups are Tiger Woods and Scottie Scheffler, both with two.

== Rule changes ==
The PGA Tour has adjusted the rules around the FedEx Cup several times. Each set of changes was introduced to address issues that arose the previous year, particularly with the playoffs portion of the FedEx Cup:

- In February 2008, the changes were designed to allow more golfers a chance to improve their positions on the points list as the playoffs progress. The changes involve a tightening of the playoff reset points and awarding more points to playoff participants. This is effectively a penalty on those players who skip a playoff event.
- In November 2008, the changes were designed to help ensure that the championship would not be won until every golfer who qualified finished playing the final playoff event. This was inspired by the fact that Vijay Singh had accumulated enough points through the first three playoff events in 2008 to guarantee that he would win the Cup without finishing the final event.
- In 2013, FedEx Cup points began to determine the 125 golfers who would retain their PGA Tour playing privileges (popularly known as "tour cards") for the following season. Previously, this was determined by position on the tour's money list at the end of the year.
- In 2019, the playoffs were reduced from four events to three. Prior to that the top 125 players entered the first event, 100 the 2nd, 70 the third and 30 the last; with the first two events featuring cuts. In 2019 it went from 125 to 70 to 30. Also starting that year, the Tour Championship featured a strokes-based system (FedEx Cup Starting Strokes). At the time, the FedEx Cup points leader after the first two playoffs events began the Tour Championship at 10-under par. The no. 2 player started at 8 under. The no. 3 player started at 7 under; the no. 4 player started at 6 under; the no. 5 player started at 5 under. Players 6–10 started at 4 under; players 11–15 started at 3 under; players 16–20 started at 2 under; players 21–25 started at 1 under; and players 26–30 started at even par. At the Tour Championship, the player with the lowest aggregate score over 72 holes, when combined with his FedEx Cup Starting Strokes, won the Tour Championship and was also crowned FedEx Cup champion.
- In 2023, the cutoff for the first Fedex Cup event was lowered to 70 and the second to 50, both with no cut.
- In 2025, the bonus pool was raised to $100 million and the rules of the final event, the Tour Championship, were changed from the previous dispersed stroke system so that the 30 players remaining all start with the same score. The winner over the course of four days is crowned the champion and wins $10 million from that event alone. Bonuses are awarded after the BMW Championship based on total points.

In 2019, the total bonus pool was increased by $25 million to $70 million, with the FedEx Cup champion earning $15 million. Among that $70 million was a $10 million regular-season bonus pool, sponsored by Wyndham, tied to the final regular-season FedEx Cup standings. This recognized the 10 players who earn the most FedEx Cup points through the Wyndham Championship, with the regular-season champion earning $2 million. Beginning in 2021, the regular-season bonus pool became sponsored by Comcast Business. As of 2022, the regular-season bonus pool was $20 million with the champion earning $4 million. Also in 2019, the FedEx Cup Playoffs finale, the Tour Championship, instituted a strokes-based system, FedEx Cup Starting Strokes. In 2022, the FedEx Cup bonus pool purse increased to $75 million, with the winner's share coming in at $18,000,000.

== Format ==
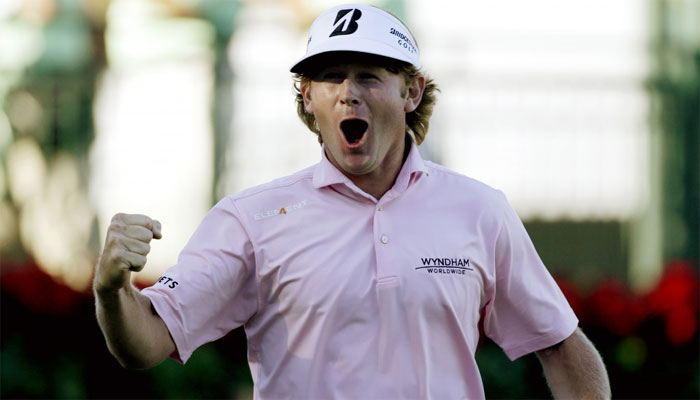
Brandt Snedeker reacting to winning the FedEx Cup at the 2012 Tour Championship

=== Qualifying for the playoffs ===
The season structure changed beginning in the fall of 2013, but the qualifying criteria have not changed since 2009.

The first part of the season is known as the "regular season" starting in January, culminating in three events called the "playoffs" in August.

Players earn points in each event they play. For all regular-season PGA Tour events, 500 FedEx Cup points are awarded to the winner, with points also being earned by every player making the cut. In "signature events", 700 FedEx Cup points go to the winner, while 750 points are given to the champion of the four majors and the Players. Lastly, 300 points are given to the winner of any event played in the same week as a major or signature event.

The goal is to be among the top 70 points leaders following the final event of the regular season.

Only those players who are regular full-time members of the PGA Tour earn points. A non-member who joins the PGA Tour in mid-season is eligible to earn points in the first event he plays after officially joining the Tour.

At the conclusion of the regular season (after the Wyndham Championship), the top 70 players in the FedEx Cup standings become eligible to play in the FedEx Cup Playoffs, a series of three events over the month of August.

Points earned during the PGA Tour regular season carry over to the playoffs. The FedEx Cup Playoffs events feature a progressive cut, with fields of 70 for FedEx St. Jude Championship, 50 for the BMW Championship and 30 for the Tour Championship held annually at East Lake Golf Club, Atlanta, Georgia, where the FedEx Cup champion is determined.

In the event an eligible player is unable or chooses not to play, the field is shortened and no alternates are added. Points from the missing positions are not awarded. The FedEx St. Jude Championship, the BMW Championship and Tour Championship are no-cut events.

The number of points awarded for winning each playoff event is 2000, which is four times the amount awarded for a typical regular season tournament. Points won in playoff events are added to those for the regular season, and the fields are reduced as the playoffs proceed. Since 2013 the top 125 on the FedEx Cup points list also retain their tour cards for the following season.

There are no points awarded for the Tour Championship and all players start even. Tour Championship win is considered an official victory, and the FedEx Cup champion also earns a bonus of $18 million and a five-year PGA Tour exemption.

=== Playoff events ===
Event	Players
FedEx St. Jude Championship	Top 70 points leaders (after the Wyndham Championship)
BMW Championship	Top 50 points leaders (after the FedEx St. Jude Championship)
Tour Championship	Top 30 points leaders (after the BMW Championship)

If an eligible player skips a playoff event, no alternates are added and the field is reduced accordingly.

=== Playoff rewards ===
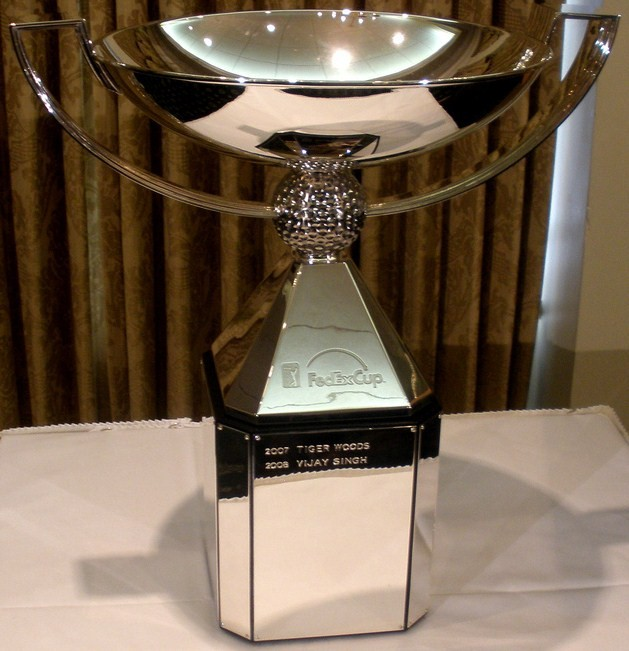
The Trophy

Starting in 2025, the 30 players with the most points after the BMW Championship win a share of the FedEx Cup bonus pool based on their standings at that point. The FedEx Cup itself goes to the winner of the Tour Championship and the prize money for that event is based on performance in that event. In 2026, the points leader (Scottie Scheffler) received $22 million. The runner-up got $13 million, 3rd place $8 million and so on down to $460,000 for 30th place.

Beginning with the 2013 season, non-exempt players who finish 126th-150th in the FedEx Cup are given conditional PGA Tour status, but can attempt to improve their status via qualifying school.

In 2007, the money was placed into their tax-deferred retirement accounts, not given in cash. Players under 45 are not able to access any 2007 FedEx Cup bonuses (as opposed to prize money earned in the tournaments themselves) until turning 45. They can invest their bonus in any manner they choose, and once they turn 45, can choose to defer payment until they turn 60 or play in fewer than 15 PGA Tour events in a season. Once a player chooses to take payments from his fund, he will receive monthly checks for five years.

Because of possible legislation affecting deferred retirement plans, in the wake of business stories that speculated that Tiger Woods could amass a $1 billion retirement fund if he won the FedEx Cup six more times, the PGA Tour announced a change to the payout system effective in 2008. The top 10 finishers now receive the bulk of their FedEx Cup bonuses in cash up front; for example, the 2008 FedEx Cup champion received $9 million up front and $1 million in his tax-deferred retirement account. FedEx Cup bonuses to finishers below the top 10 are still paid solely into the players' retirement accounts.

The winner of the FedEx Cup also receives a five-year exemption on the PGA Tour, mirroring the exemption that was given to the tour's leading money winner prior to 2017. Before the change in format in 2019, that made it impossible for the FedEx Cup and the Tour Championship to be won by two different players, the Tour Championship winner received a three-year exemption. Winners of other playoff events receive only the standard 2-year exemption.

Since 2013, the FedEx Cup standings have been the primary means of determining exemption status for the following year; the 125 players who qualify for the playoffs are fully exempt. Players who finish 126th through 150th, if not exempt through other means such as a recent tournament win, retain conditional status; these, along with finishers 151 through 200, are eligible for the Korn Ferry Tour Finals, through which they may regain their cards if not already exempt.

Before 2013, the money list rather than the FedEx Cup standings determined exemption status. Since the money and point distributions were different and the money list was not finalized until after the Fall Series, it was common for players to qualify for the playoffs and still lose their card at the end of the season.

== Winners ==
Year	Winner	Score/ points	Margin	Playoffs		Regular season		
Year	Winner	Score/ points	Margin	Events	Wins	Ranking	Points	Events
2026	(United States) Scottie Scheffler (2)	−16	3 strokes	3	2	1	4,123	17
2025	(England) Tommy Fleetwood	−18	3 strokes	3	1	5	2,923	18
2024	(United States) Scottie Scheffler	−30	4 strokes	3	1	1	6,615	18
2023	(Norway) Viktor Hovland	−27	5 strokes	3	2	7	1,795	20
2022	(Northern Ireland) Rory McIlroy (3)	−21	1 stroke	3	1	6	2,104	13
2021	(United States) Patrick Cantlay	−21	1 stroke	3	2	3	2,056	21
2020	(United States) Dustin Johnson	−21	3 strokes	3	2	15	1,071	11
2019	(Northern Ireland) Rory McIlroy (2)	−18	4 strokes	3	1	5	2,842	18
2018	(England) Justin Rose	2,260	41	4	0	4	1,991	14
2017	(United States) Justin Thomas	3,000	660	4	1	2	2,689	21
2016	(Northern Ireland) Rory McIlroy	3,120	740	4	2	36	973	14
2015	(United States) Jordan Spieth	3,800	1,493	4	1	1	4,169	21
2014	(United States) Billy Horschel	4,750	1,650	4	2	69	722	23
2013	(Sweden) Henrik Stenson	4,750	2,007	4	2	9	1,426	14
2012	(United States) Brandt Snedeker	4,100	1,273	4	1	19	1,194	18
2011	(United States) Bill Haas	2,760	15	4	1	15	1,273	22
2010	(United States) Jim Furyk	2,980	252	3	1	3	1,691	18
2009	(United States) Tiger Woods (2)	4,000	1,080	4	1	1	3,341	13
2008	(Fiji) Vijay Singh	125,101	551	4	2	7	15,034	19
2007	(United States) Tiger Woods	123,033	12,578	3	2	1	30,574	13

== Individual tournament winners ==
Year	FedEx St. Jude Championship	BMW Championship	Tour Championship
2026	(United States) Scottie Scheffler (3/4)	(United States) Wyndham Clark	(United States) Scottie Scheffler (4/4)
2025	(England) Justin Rose (2/2)	(United States) Scottie Scheffler (2/4)	(England) Tommy Fleetwood
2024	(Japan) Hideki Matsuyama	(United States) Keegan Bradley (2/2)	(United States) Scottie Scheffler (1/4)
2023	(United States) Lucas Glover	(Norway) Viktor Hovland (1/2)	(Norway) Viktor Hovland (2/2)
2022	(United States) Will Zalatoris	(United States) Patrick Cantlay (3/3)	(Northern Ireland) Rory McIlroy (6/6)
Year	The Northern Trust	BMW Championship	Tour Championship
2021	(United States) Tony Finau	(United States) Patrick Cantlay (1/3)	(United States) Patrick Cantlay (2/3)
2020	(United States) Dustin Johnson (5/6)	(Spain) Jon Rahm	(United States) Dustin Johnson (6/6)
2019	(United States) Patrick Reed (2/2)	(United States) Justin Thomas (2/2)	(Northern Ireland) Rory McIlroy (5/6)

Year	The Northern Trust	Dell Technologies Championship	BMW Championship	Tour Championship
2018	(United States) Bryson DeChambeau (1/2)	(United States) Bryson DeChambeau (2/2)	(United States) Keegan Bradley (1/2)	(United States) Tiger Woods (4/4)
2017	(United States) Dustin Johnson (4/6)	(United States) Justin Thomas (1/2)	(Australia) Marc Leishman	(United States) Xander Schauffele
2016	(United States) Patrick Reed (1/2)	(Northern Ireland) Rory McIlroy (3/6)	(United States) Dustin Johnson (3/6)	(Northern Ireland) Rory McIlroy (4/6)
2015	(Australia) Jason Day (1/2)	(United States) Rickie Fowler	(Australia) Jason Day (2/2)	(United States) Jordan Spieth
2014	(United States) Hunter Mahan	(United States) Chris Kirk	(United States) Billy Horschel (1/2)	(United States) Billy Horschel (2/2)
2013	(Australia) Adam Scott	(Sweden) Henrik Stenson (1/2)	(United States) Zach Johnson	(Sweden) Henrik Stenson (2/2)
2012	(United States) Nick Watney	(Northern Ireland) Rory McIlroy (1/6)	(Northern Ireland) Rory McIlroy (2/6)	(United States) Brandt Snedeker
2011	(United States) Dustin Johnson (2/6)	(United States) Webb Simpson	(England) Justin Rose (1/2)	(United States) Bill Haas
2010	(United States) Matt Kuchar	(United States) Charley Hoffman	(United States) Dustin Johnson (1/6)	(United States) Jim Furyk
2009	(United States) Heath Slocum	(United States) Steve Stricker (2/2)	(United States) Tiger Woods (3/4)	(United States) Phil Mickelson (2/2)
2008	(Fiji) Vijay Singh (1/2)	(Fiji) Vijay Singh (2/2)	(Colombia) Camilo Villegas (1/2)	(Colombia) Camilo Villegas (2/2)
2007	(United States) Steve Stricker (1/2)	(United States) Phil Mickelson (1/2)	(United States) Tiger Woods (1/4)	(United States) Tiger Woods (2/4)

== Career FedEx Cup bonus leaders ==
Players who have $8 million or more in total FedEx Cup bonus money (2007–2026) Amounts won (US$ thousands) each year and in total are shown, with 1st place , 2nd place , and 3rd place yearly finishes highlighted
Player	Total	2007	2008	2009	2010	2011	2012	2013	2014	2015	2016	2017	2018	2019	2020	2021	2022	2023	2024	2025	2026
(United States) Scottie Scheffler	73,717														2,500	467	5,750	2,000	25,000	15,000	23,000
(Northern Ireland) Rory McIlroy	64,537				140		3,000	125	2,000	250	10,000	110	275	15,000	960	584	18,000	4,000	1,608	7,500	985
(United States) Xander Schauffele	30,168											2,000	250	5,000	4,500	2,200	4,000	6,500	4,833		885
(United States) Tiger Woods	28,594	10,000	110	10,000	133	32	2,000	3,000					3,000	169	150						
(United States) Justin Thomas	27,387									155	290	10,000	700	3,500	4,500	3,000	2,750	140	905	1,165	282
(United States) Dustin Johnson	27,057		32	270	1,000	1,500	600	280	175	700	3,000	1,500	1,500	400	15,000	1,100					
(Norway) Viktor Hovland	23,163														498	2,200	715	18,000	1,000	235	515
(United States) Patrick Cantlay	18,477														181		715	999			13,000
(England) Justin Rose	17,945	245	70	75	248	1,000	800	500	300	600	120	550	10,000	430	105	70	120	221	191	1,800	500
(United States) Collin Morikawa	16,040																		12,500	240	3,300
(United States) Matthew Fitzpatrick	14,895											180	225	478	186	15,000	1,750	3,000	755	270	630
(United States) Jordan Spieth	16,961							700	250	10,000	550	3,000	165	167	101	498	825	530	175		
(United States) Billy Horschel	15,843						32	245	10,000	110	125	133	1,000	168	395	890	600	130	615		140
(United States) Jim Furyk	15,407	300	1,000	1,500	10,000	140	250	270	1,500	180	75		32	160							
(United States) Wyndham Clark	15,250																2,000	3,500	2,250		8,000
(Sweden) Henrik Stenson	13,863	136			32		70	10,000	115	3,000	140	155	110	105							
(United States) Brandt Snedeker	13,095	225	145	150	138	600	10,000	290	75	210	250	80	135	451	101	105					140
(Australia) Adam Scott	12,907	290	128	70	230	245	200	1,500	290	70	1,500	80	120	1,900	171	105	550	140	4,833		485
(United States) Bill Haas	11,545	32	80	134	165	10,000	155	205	243	190	129	142		70							
(South Korea) Im Sung-jae	11,343													513	750	498	5,750	565	2,750	205	313
(Spain) Jon Rahm	11,278											1,000	210	683	3,000	5,000	715	670			
(Fiji) Vijay Singh	11,272	500	10,000	75	110	185	150	32	75	70	75										
(United States) Phil Mickelson	9,024	2,000	700	3,000	280	250	1,000	550	110	110	245	145	220	164	110	140					
(United States) Steve Stricker	8,682	3,000	270	2,000	700	235	225		2,000	70		80	70	32							
(United States) Sahith Theegala	8,547																520	250	7,500		277

== See also ==
- List of point distributions of the FedEx Cup
