= 2011 FedEx Cup Playoffs =

Tournament information
- Dates: August 25 – September 25, 2011
- Location: Plainfield Country Club; TPC Boston; Cog Hill Golf & Country Club; East Lake Golf Club
- Tour: PGA Tour

Statistics
- Field: 125 for The Barclays; 100 for Deutsche Bank; 70 for BMW Championship; 30 for Tour Championship
- Prize fund: $35,000,000 bonus money
- Winner's share: $10,000,000 bonus money

Champion
- (United States) Bill Haas
- 2,760 points

The 2011 FedEx Cup Playoffs, the series of four golf tournaments that determined the season champion on the U.S.-based PGA Tour, began on August 25 and ended on September 25. It included the following four events:

- The Barclays — Plainfield Country Club, Edison, New Jersey
- Deutsche Bank Championship — TPC Boston, Norton, Massachusetts
- BMW Championship — Cog Hill Golf & Country Club, Lemont, Illinois
- Tour Championship — East Lake Golf Club, Atlanta, Georgia

Bill Haas won the FedEx Cup by winning the Tour Championship in a playoff.

These were the fifth FedEx Cup playoffs since their inception in 2007.

The point distributions can be seen here.

== Regular season rankings ==
Place	Player	Points	Events
1	(United States) Nick Watney	1,906	17
2	(United States) Steve Stricker	1,865	15
3	(United States) Webb Simpson	1,861	20
4	(England) Luke Donald	1,856	14
5	(United States) Keegan Bradley	1,621	24
6	(United States) Phil Mickelson	1,601	17
7	(South Korea) K. J. Choi	1,601	18
8	(United States) Bubba Watson	1,577	18
9	(United States) David Toms	1,538	18
10	(United States) Gary Woodland	1,466	20

== The Barclays ==
The Barclays was played August 25–28. Of the 125 players eligible to play in the event, two did not enter: Charl Schwartzel (ranked 21) and J. B. Holmes (66). The PGA Tour announced on Friday, August 26 that the event would be shortened to 54-holes due to the anticipated arrival of Hurricane Irene on Sunday, August 28. Of the 123 entrants, 72 made the second-round cut at 138 (−4).

Dustin Johnson won by two strokes over defending champion Matt Kuchar and moved to first place in the standings. The top 100 players in the points standings advanced to the Deutsche Bank Championship. This included eight players who were outside the top 100 prior to The Barclays: Camilo Villegas, Chris Stroud, Ian Poulter, Pádraig Harrington, Bill Lunde, William McGirt, John Merrick and Ernie Els.

					FedEx Cup rank	
Place	Player	Score	To par	Winnings ($)	After	Before
1	(United States) Dustin Johnson	66-63-65=194	−19	1,440,000	1	19
2	(United States) Matt Kuchar	63-65-68=196	−17	864,000	2	12
T3	(Fiji) Vijay Singh	65-64-68=197	−16	464,000	8	36
T3	(United States) Brandt Snedeker	70-66-61=197	−16	464,000	6	18
5	(United States) Jonathan Byrd	65-66-67=198	−15	320,000	12	24
T6	(England) Brian Davis	69-66-64=199	−14	259,000	30	57
T6	(England) Justin Rose	67-65-67=199	−14	259,000	27	44
T6	(Colombia) Camilo Villegas	68-66-65=199	−14	259,000	51	109
T6	(South Korea) Yang Yong-eun	70-66-63=199	−14	259,000	26	43
T10	(United States) Charley Hoffman	66-66-68=200	−13	200,000	33	49
T10	(United States) Webb Simpson	71-66-63=200	−13	200,000	4	3
T10	(United States) Nick Watney	67-69-64=200	−13	200,000	3	1

== Deutsche Bank Championship ==
The Deutsche Bank Championship was played September 2–5. Of the 100 players eligible to play in the event, one did not enter: J. B. Holmes. Of the 99 entrants, 78 made the second-round cut at one-over-par, 143

Webb Simpson won on the second hole of a sudden-death playoff over Chez Reavie. Simpson moved to first place in the standings. The top 70 players in the points standings advanced to the BMW Championship. This included eight players who were outside the top 70 prior to the Deutsche Bank Championship: Chez Reavie, Blake Adams, Chad Campbell, Andrés Romero, Johnson Wagner, Ernie Els, Geoff Ogilvy, and Chris Stroud.

					FedEx Cup rank	
Place	Player	Score	To par	Winnings ($)	After	Before
1	(United States) Webb Simpson	69-68-67-65=269	−15	1,440,000	1	4
2	(United States) Chez Reavie	67-68-68-66=269	−15	864,000	9	87
T3	(Australia) Jason Day	67-69-67-68=271	−13	416,000	6	15
T3	(England) Luke Donald	66-70-68-67=271	−13	416,000	4	5
T3	(United States) Brandt Snedeker	69-64-72-66=271	−13	416,000	5	6
6	(United States) Jim Furyk	69-69-66-68=272	−12	288,000	35	60
7	(United States) Bo Van Pelt	73-68-66-66=273	−11	268,000	22	32
T8	(United States) Hunter Mahan	68-71-69-66=274	−10	240,000	18	24
T8	(Australia) Adam Scott	69-63-71-71=274	−10	240,000	16	23
T10	(United States) Blake Adams	70-67-68-70=275	−9	177,333	57	81
T10	(United States) Jerry Kelly	66-69-68-72=275	−9	177,333	40	47
T10	(United States) Phil Mickelson	70-73-63-69=275	−9	177,333	10	11
T10	(United States) Ryan Moore	68-68-69-70=275	−9	177,333	39	44
T10	(United States) Kyle Stanley	68-71-68-68=275	−9	177,333	30	39
T10	(United States) Brendan Steele	69-67-67-72=275	−9	177,333	42	54

== BMW Championship ==
The BMW Championship was played September 15–18, after a one-week break. All 70 players eligible to play in the event did so. There was no cut.

The top 30 players in FedEx Cup points after this event advanced to the Tour Championship and also earned spots in the 2012 Masters Tournament, U.S. Open, and (British) Open Championship.

Justin Rose won the event by two strokes over John Senden and moved to third in the rankings. Three players who were outside the top 30 prior to the BMW Championship played their way into the Tour Championship: Justin Rose, John Senden, and Geoff Ogilvy.

With the FedEx Cup points reset after the BMW Championship, all 30 remaining players have at least a mathematical chance to secure the season crown, and any of the top five players can claim the FedEx Cup with a win in the Tour Championship.

					FedEx Cup rank	
Place	Player	Score	To par	Winnings ($)	After	Before
1	(England) Justin Rose	63-68-69-71=271	−13	1,440,000	3	34
2	(Australia) John Senden	68-66-70-69=273	−11	864,000	9	55
3	(Australia) Geoff Ogilvy	69-68-68-69=274	−10	544,000	24	69
4	(England) Luke Donald	75-66-67-68=276	−8	384,000	4	4
5	(United States) Webb Simpson	65-68-73-71=277	−7	320,000	1	1
T6	(United States) Jason Dufner	71-68-71-68=278	−6	278,000	22	29
T6	(Colombia) Camilo Villegas	68-73-71-66=278	−6	278,000	33	47
8	(United States) Chez Reavie	69-70-70-70=279	−5	248,000	8	9
9	(United States) Brandt Jobe	75-64-69-72=280	−4	232,000	51	63
T10	(South Korea) K. J. Choi	67-71-73-70=281	−3	208,000	13	15
T10	(United States) David Toms	71-66-73-71=281	−3	208,000	16	20

== Reset points ==
The points were reset after the BMW Championship.

Place	Player	Points	Reset points	Events
1	(United States) Webb Simpson	5,261	2,500	23
2	(United States) Dustin Johnson	3,841	2,250	20
3	(England) Justin Rose	3,748	2,000	21
4	(England) Luke Donald	3,625	1,800	17
5	(United States) Matt Kuchar	3,349	1,600	22
6	(United States) Brandt Snedeker	3,094	1,400	24
7	(United States) Nick Watney	2,516	1,200	20
8	(United States) Chez Reavie	2,513	1,000	25
9	(Australia) John Senden	2,474	800	24
10	(Australia) Jason Day	2,459	600	20

== Tour Championship ==
The Tour Championship was played September 22–25. All 30 golfers who qualified for the tournament played, and there was no cut. Bill Haas won the tournament, in a playoff over Hunter Mahan, and the FedEx Cup.

					FedEx Cup rank	
Place	Player	Score	To par	Winnings ($)	After	Before
1	(United States) Bill Haas	68-67-69-68=272	−8	1,440,000	1	25
2	(United States) Hunter Mahan	67-68-66-71=272	−8	864,000	7	21
T3	(Australia) Aaron Baddeley	68-69-64-72=273	−7	418,667	14	27
T3	(South Korea) K. J. Choi	68-65-70-70=273	−7	418,667	11	13
T3	(England) Luke Donald	66-68-70-69=273	−7	418,667	3	4
T6	(Australia) Jason Day	67-67-69-71=274	−6	272,000	12	10
T6	(United States) Charles Howell III	67-71-68-68=274	−6	272,000	19	26
T6	(Australia) Adam Scott	67-65-74-68=274	−6	272,000	16	19
9	(United States) Bo Van Pelt	71-70-66-68=275	−5	240,000	23	30
10	(United States) Phil Mickelson	68-70-67-71=276	−4	227,200	15	14

== Final leaderboard ==
Place	Player	Points	Winnings ($)
1	(United States) Bill Haas	2760.0	10,000,000
2	(United States) Webb Simpson	2745.0	3,000,000
3	(England) Luke Donald	2566.7	2,000,000
4	(United States) Dustin Johnson	2487.5	1,500,000
5	(England) Justin Rose	2252.5	1,000,000
6	(United States) Matt Kuchar	1852.5	800,000
7	(United States) Hunter Mahan	1800.0	700,000
8	(United States) Brandt Snedeker	1667.5	600,000
9	(United States) Nick Watney	1420.0	550,000
10	(United States) Chez Reavie	1220.0	500,000

For the full list see here.

== Table of qualifying players ==
Table key:

Win
Top-10 finish
Did not advance to next tournament
Played way into next tournament

	Player	Pre-Playoffs		The Barclays		Deutsche Bank		BMW Champ.		Reset points	Tour Champ.	
	Player	Points	Rank	Finish	Rank after	Finish	Rank after	Finish	Rank after	Reset points	Finish	Final rank
(United States)	Nick Watney	1,906	1	T10	3	T61	7	T22	7	1,200	T26	9
(United States)	Steve Stricker	1,865	2	T24	7	T42	8	WD	12	460	15	18
(United States)	Webb Simpson	1,861	3	T10	4	1	1	5	1	2,500	22	2
(England)	Luke Donald	1,856	4	T18	5	T3	4	4	4	1,800	T3	3
(United States)	Keegan Bradley*	1,621	5	CUT	14	CUT	19	T16	20	310	T11	20
(United States)	Phil Mickelson	1,601	6	T43	11	T10	10	T56	14	420	10	15
(South Korea)	K. J. Choi	1,601	7	T32	9	CUT	15	T10	13	440	T3	11
(United States)	Bubba Watson	1,577	8	CUT	16	T16	12	T53	18	340	T23	26
(United States)	David Toms	1,538	9	CUT	17	T59	20	T10	16	380	T16	20
(United States)	Gary Woodland*	1,466	10	T13	10	T25	11	T16	11	480	T13	17
(United States)	Mark Wilson	1,461	11	T24	13	T56	17	T22	15	400	T26	22
(United States)	Matt Kuchar	1,407	12	2	2	T25	3	T22	5	1,600	T20	6
(Australia)	Adam Scott	1,332	13	T67	23	T8	16	T37	19	320	T6	16
(Australia)	Jason Day	1,308	14	T13	15	T3	6	T49	10	600	T6	12
(United States)	Bill Haas	1,273	15	T24	18	T61	24	T16	25	260	1	1
(Sweden)	Freddie Jacobson	1,235	16	T32	21	T42	23	T42	29	220	T16	29
(Scotland)	Martin Laird	1,234	17	T58	25	T74	31	T12	31	–	–	31
(United States)	Brandt Snedeker	1,227	18	T3	6	T3	5	T22	6	1,400	T16	8
(United States)	Dustin Johnson	1,191	19	1	1	T42	2	T65	2	2,250	T23	4
(United States)	Hunter Mahan	1,186	20	T43	24	T8	18	T42	21	300	2	7
(South Africa)	Charl Schwartzel*	1,185	21	DNP	28	T21	27	T42	32	–	–	32
(Australia)	Aaron Baddeley	1,181	22	T13	19	T77	25	T22	27	240	T3	14
(South Africa)	Rory Sabbatini	1,175	23	T18	20	T68	26	T59	35	–	–	35
(United States)	Jonathan Byrd	1,165	24	5	12	T56	13	T37	17	360	30	27
(United States)	Jason Dufner	1,143	25	CUT	29	T31	29	T6	22	290	T13	25
(United States)	Charles Howell III	1,137	26	T18	22	T31	21	T42	26	250	T6	19
(United States)	D. A. Points	1,055	27	CUT	34	CUT	49	T53	56	–	–	56
(United States)	Rickie Fowler	1,038	28	T52	31	T52	37	48	43	–	–	43
(United States)	Spencer Levin	1,025	29	CUT	35	T37	41	T49	47	–	–	47
(United States)	Tommy Gainey*	999	30	CUT	37	CUT	54	69	62	–	–	62
(United States)	Scott Stallings*	992	31	CUT	38	T52	46	62	57	–	–	57
(United States)	Zach Johnson	962	32	CUT	40	T16	36	T31	40	–	–	40
(United States)	Chris Kirk*	957	33	CUT	41	T31	43	T31	42	–	–	42
(United States)	Steve Marino	935	34	71	42	T16	38	T59	49	–	–	49
(Venezuela)	Jhonattan Vegas*	919	35	70	43	T42	50	T49	54	–	–	54
(Fiji)	Vijay Singh	903	36	T3	8	CUT	14	67	23	280	T16	28
(United States)	Ryan Palmer	902	37	T43	36	T61	48	T49	53	–	–	53
(United States)	Ryan Moore	883	38	CUT	44	T10	39	T16	37	–	–	37
(United States)	Bo Van Pelt	881	39	T24	32	7	22	T56	30	210	9	23
(United States)	Lucas Glover	875	40	CUT	45	T21	45	T31	45	–	–	45
(United States)	Brendan Steele*	826	41	CUT	54	T10	42	68	52	–	–	52
(United States)	Brandt Jobe*	803	42	CUT	56	T61	63	9	51	–	–	51
(South Korea)	Yong-eun Yang	799	43	T6	26	T42	28	T12	28	230	29	30
(England)	Justin Rose	796	44	T6	27	T68	34	1	3	2,000	T20	5
(Sweden)	Robert Karlsson*	789	45	T52	46	T16	44	T37	46	–	–	46
(Zimbabwe)	Brendon de Jonge	784	46	T58	52	CUT	64	T31	60	–	–	60
(United States)	Kevin Na	778	47	CUT	57	CUT	71	–	–	–	–	71
(United States)	Kyle Stanley*	761	48	T24	39	T10	30	T22	34	–	–	34
(United States)	Charley Hoffman	746	49	T10	33	T31	32	T53	41	–	–	41
(Australia)	John Senden	732	50	CUT	61	T21	55	2	9	800	25	13
(United States)	Sean O'Hair	724	51	CUT	62	T25	56	T37	58	–	–	58
(United States)	Pat Perez	716	52	WD	63	T61	75	–	–	–	–	75
(United States)	Robert Garrigus	702	53	CUT	67	T59	74	–	–	–	–	74
(United States)	George McNeill	694	54	CUT	69	T37	61	64	68	–	–	68
(Sweden)	Carl Pettersson	691	55	T32	49	T37	52	T16	48	–	–	48
(United States)	Brian Gay	685	56	CUT	71	CUT	82	–	–	–	–	82
(England)	Brian Davis	685	57	T6	30	T42	33	T31	39	–	–	39
(Australia)	Robert Allenby	679	58	T52	59	T52	62	T12	55	–	–	55
(Spain)	Sergio García	662	59	T32	53	T31	53	T12	44	–	–	44
(United States)	Jim Furyk	661	60	T52	60	6	35	T22	36	–	–	36
(United States)	Harrison Frazar	660	61	T58	64	CUT	77	–	–	–	–	77
(Argentina)	Andrés Romero	651	62	T64	72	T31	59	T56	66	–	–	66
(United States)	Jerry Kelly	651	63	T24	47	T10	40	T16	38	–	–	38
(United States)	Cameron Tringale*	644	64	T32	55	CUT	66	T31	63	–	–	63
(United States)	Kris Blanks	641	65	T58	68	CUT	80	–	–	–	–	80
(United States)	J. B. Holmes	640	66	DNP	77	WD	86	–	–	–	–	86
(United States)	Blake Adams	616	67	CUT	81	T10	57	61	64	–	–	64
(United States)	Jimmy Walker	615	68	T18	48	T37	51	T22	50	–	–	50
(United States)	Jeff Overton	611	69	CUT	82	T68	90	–	–	–	–	90
(United States)	John Rollins	608	70	CUT	83	T68	92	–	–	–	–	92
(United States)	Kevin Streelman	600	71	T32	58	CUT	72	–	–	–	–	72
(United States)	J. J. Henry	599	72	T58	76	T52	76	–	–	–	–	76
(South Korea)	Charlie Wi	591	73	T43	65	CUT	78	–	–	–	–	78
(United States)	Chad Campbell	591	74	T52	73	T21	58	T37	59	–	–	59
(United States)	Scott Verplank	588	75	CUT	86	CUT	93	–	–	–	–	93
(United States)	Chez Reavie	588	76	CUT	87	2	9	8	8	1,000	T26	10
(United States)	Johnson Wagner	585	77	CUT	88	T25	67	63	70	–	–	70
(United States)	Chris Couch	573	78	WD	90	CUT	94	–	–	–	–	94
(Australia)	Geoff Ogilvy	571	79	T67	91	T25	69	3	24	270	T11	24
(United States)	Scott Piercy	571	80	T13	50	T74	60	T65	69	–	–	69
(United States)	Davis Love III	557	81	CUT	93	T68	95	–	–	–	–	95
(United States)	Stewart Cink	556	82	CUT	94	CUT	98	–	–	–	–	98
(United States)	Ricky Barnes	552	83	CUT	95	76	97	–	–	–	–	97
(United States)	Troy Matteson	542	84	CUT	97	T77	99	–	–	–	–	99
(Japan)	Ryuji Imada	529	85	T58	89	T61	91	–	–	–	–	91
(United States)	Ben Crane	526	86	CUT	100	T61	96	–	–	–	–	96
(Australia)	Marc Leishman	522	87	T32	70	T42	65	T42	65	–	–	65
(United States)	Kevin Chappell*	503	88	T32	74	CUT	84	–	–	–	–	84
(United States)	Hunter Haas*	499	89	CUT	103	–	–	–	–	–	–	103
(United States)	Chris DiMarco	499	90	CUT	104	–	–	–	–	–	–	104
(United States)	Bryce Molder	493	91	T64	101	–	–	–	–	–	–	101
(United States)	Anthony Kim	485	92	T24	66	CUT	79	–	–	–	–	79
(Northern Ireland)	Graeme McDowell*	485	93	T43	84	T37	73	–	–	–	–	73
(United States)	Paul Goydos	474	94	CUT	105	–	–	–	–	–	–	105
(South Africa)	Trevor Immelman	468	95	T32	79	CUT	88	–	–	–	–	88
(Australia)	Nick O'Hern	463	96	CUT	107	–	–	–	–	–	–	107
(United States)	Matt Bettencourt	461	97	CUT	108	–	–	–	–	–	–	108
(United States)	Tim Herron	456	98	CUT	110	–	–	–	–	–	–	110
(United States)	Michael Bradley*	454	99	CUT	111	–	–	–	–	–	–	111
(Australia)	Greg Chalmers	450	100	T43	92	T42	81	–	–	–	–	81
(South Africa)	Retief Goosen	439	101	72	112	–	–	–	–	–	–	112
(United States)	Tom Gillis	431	102	CUT	114	–	–	–	–	–	–	114
(United States)	Bill Lunde	428	103	T32	85	T56	85	–	–	–	–	85
(United States)	John Merrick	415	104	T43	98	CUT	100	–	–	–	–	100
(United States)	Kevin Stadler	414	105	T64	113	–	–	–	–	–	–	113
(United States)	Chris Stroud	413	106	T18	75	T42	70	T22	61	–	–	61
(United States)	Michael Thompson*	413	107	CUT	115	–	–	–	–	–	–	115
(United States)	Vaughn Taylor	397	108	CUT	116	–	–	–	–	–	–	116
(Colombia)	Camilo Villegas	395	109	T6	51	T25	47	T6	33	–	–	33
(United States)	Josh Teater	393	110	T43	102	–	–	–	–	–	–	102
(United States)	D. J. Trahan	392	111	T52	106	–	–	–	–	–	–	106
(United States)	Heath Slocum	388	112	CUT	117	–	–	–	–	–	–	117
(Australia)	Stuart Appleby	387	113	WD	118	–	–	–	–	–	–	118
(England)	Ian Poulter	387	114	T18	78	CUT	87	–	–	–	–	87
(Australia)	Rod Pampling	385	115	CUT	119	–	–	–	–	–	–	119
(United States)	Joe Ogilvie	364	116	CUT	120	–	–	–	–	–	–	120
(Canada)	David Hearn*	362	117	T67	121	–	–	–	–	–	–	121
(South Africa)	Ernie Els	357	118	T32	99	T16	68	T42	67	–	–	67
(United States)	Billy Mayfair	353	119	CUT	122	–	–	–	–	–	–	122
(United States)	James Driscoll	353	120	CUT	123	–	–	–	–	–	–	123
(United States)	Steve Flesch	352	121	WD	124	–	–	–	–	–	–	124
(Australia)	Steven Bowditch*	347	122	CUT	125	–	–	–	–	–	–	125
(India)	Arjun Atwal*	339	123	T43	109	–	–	–	–	–	–	109
(Republic of Ireland)	Pádraig Harrington	338	124	T13	80	73	89	–	–	–	–	89
(United States)	William McGirt*	334	125	T24	96	T42	83	–	–	–	–	83

* First-time Playoffs participant
