= 2011 WGC-Cadillac Championship =

Coordinates: 25.815°N 80.340°W

Tournament information
- Dates: March 10–13, 2011
- Location: Doral, Florida, U.S.
- Course(s): Doral Golf Resort & Spa
- Tour(s): PGA Tour; European Tour

Statistics
- Par: 72
- Length: 7,266 yards (6,644 m)
- Field: 66 players
- Cut: None
- Prize fund: $8,500,000 €5,984,757
- Winner's share: $1,400,000 €999,572

Champion
- (United States) Nick Watney
- 272 (−16)

Location in the United States

The 2011 WGC-Cadillac Championship was a golf tournament held March 10–13 at Doral Golf Resort & Spa in Doral, Florida, a suburb west of Miami. It was the 12th WGC-Cadillac Championship tournament, the second of four World Golf Championships events staged in 2011. Cadillac replaced CA Technologies as the title sponsor.

Nick Watney shot a final round 67 (−5) to win his first WGC event, two strokes ahead of runner-up Dustin Johnson.

== Field ==
The field consisted of players from the top of the Official World Golf Ranking and the money lists/Order of Merit from the six main professional golf tours. Each player is classified according to the first category in which he qualified, but other categories are shown in parentheses.

Initially, all 69 players who qualified for the tournament were scheduled to play.

1. The top 50 players from the Official World Golf Ranking, as of February 28, 2011
Robert Allenby (2,3), Paul Casey (2,3,5,6), K. J. Choi (2,3), Jason Day (2,3), Luke Donald (2,3,4,5,6), Ernie Els (2,3,5), Ross Fisher (2,5), Rickie Fowler (2), Jim Furyk (2,3), Retief Goosen (2,3), Bill Haas (2), Peter Hanson (2,5), Pádraig Harrington (2,5), Yuta Ikeda (2), Ryo Ishikawa (2), Miguel Ángel Jiménez (2,5,6), Dustin Johnson (2,3), Zach Johnson (2,3), Robert Karlsson (2,5), Martin Kaymer (2,5,6), Anthony Kim (2), Kim Kyung-tae (2,7), Matt Kuchar (2,3,4), Martin Laird (2,3), Hunter Mahan (2,3), Graeme McDowell (2,5), Rory McIlroy (2,5,6), Phil Mickelson (2,3), Edoardo Molinari (2,5), Francesco Molinari (2,5), Ryan Moore (2,3), Geoff Ogilvy (2,3,8), Louis Oosthuizen (2,5), Ian Poulter (2,5), Álvaro Quirós (2,5,6), Justin Rose (2,3), Charl Schwartzel (2,5,6,9), Adam Scott (2,3), Vijay Singh (4), Steve Stricker (2,3), Bo Van Pelt (2,3), Camilo Villegas (2,3), Nick Watney (2,3), Lee Westwood (2,5), Mark Wilson (2,4), Tiger Woods (2), Yang Yong-eun (2)

Three golfers withdrew from the tournament shortly before it started: Tim Clark (2,3) (elbow), Ben Crane (2,3) (back), and Bubba Watson (2,3,4) (flu).

2. The top 50 players from the Official World Golf Ranking, as of March 7, 2011
Hiroyuki Fujita (7)

3. The top 30 players from the final 2010 FedExCup Points List
Charley Hoffman, Kevin Na, Jeff Overton, Ryan Palmer, Kevin Streelman

4. The top 10 players from the 2011 FedExCup Points List, as of March 7, 2011
Aaron Baddeley, Jonathan Byrd, D. A. Points, Rory Sabbatini, Jhonattan Vegas

5. The top 20 players from the final 2010 European Tour Order of Merit
Rhys Davies, Anders Hansen

6. The top 10 players from the European Tour Order of Merit, as of February 28, 2011
Thomas Aiken (9), Thomas Bjørn, Shiv Chawrasia

7. The top 2 players from the final 2010 Japan Golf Tour Order of Merit

8. The top 2 players from the final 2010 PGA Tour of Australasia Order of Merit
Peter Senior

9. The top 2 players from the final 2010 Sunshine Tour Order of Merit

10. The top 2 players from the final 2010 Asian Tour Order of Merit
Marcus Fraser, Noh Seung-yul

== Round summaries ==
=== First round ===
Thursday, March 10, 2011
Friday, March 11, 2011

The first round was significantly delayed when a storm blew in shortly after play began on Thursday. Play was resumed in the afternoon, but almost all players were still on the course when darkness fell. At this point, Hunter Mahan led the field at 7-under-par through his first 11 holes, and held on to the lead when the first round was concluded on Friday morning. Teenager Ryo Ishikawa was one shot back in second, while new world number one Martin Kaymer was third; several players including Luke Donald and Matt Kuchar had reached the 6-under mark in their rounds, then dropped back.

Place	Player	Score	To par
1	(United States) Hunter Mahan	64	−8
2	(Japan) Ryo Ishikawa	65	−7
3	(Germany) Martin Kaymer	66	−6
T4	(England) Luke Donald	67	−5
T4	(United States) Charley Hoffman	67	−5
T4	(Scotland) Martin Laird	67	−5
T4	(United States) Nick Watney	67	−5
T8	(South Africa) Thomas Aiken	68	−4
T8	(Republic of Ireland) Pádraig Harrington	68	−4
T8	(United States) Matt Kuchar	68	−4
T8	(Northern Ireland) Rory McIlroy	68	−4
T8	(Italy) Francesco Molinari	68	−4
T8	(United States) D. A. Points	68	−4
T8	(Australia) Adam Scott	68	−4
T8	(Fiji) Vijay Singh	68	−4
T8	(United States) Kevin Streelman	68	−4
T8	(United States) Steve Stricker	68	−4

=== Second round ===
Friday, March 11, 2011

Scoring proved more difficult in the second round as high winds returned to the Doral course. The low round of the day was Aaron Baddeley's 66. Hunter Mahan retained his one shot lead after a steady 71, with Martin Kaymer and Francesco Molinari a shot further back. This meant that the three leading players at the halfway stage were the World Number One, and the winners of the previous two stroke play-format WGC events. Ryo Ishikawa, who started the round in second place, shot a four-over-par 76 on the day his home nation of Japan was devastated by an earthquake and tsunami.

Place	Player	Score	To par
1	(United States) Hunter Mahan	64-71=135	−9
T2	(Germany) Martin Kaymer	66-70=136	−8
T2	(Italy) Francesco Molinari	68-68=136	−8
T4	(United States) Matt Kuchar	68-69=137	−7
T4	(Scotland) Martin Laird	67-70=137	−7
T4	(Northern Ireland) Rory McIlroy	68-69=137	−7
T4	(United States) Nick Watney	67-70=137	−7
T8	(Australia) Aaron Baddeley	72-66=138	−6
T8	(United States) Dustin Johnson	69-69=138	−6
T8	(Australia) Adam Scott	69-69=138	−6

=== Third round ===
Saturday, March 12, 2011

Dustin Johnson was the big mover on Saturday, shooting a 65, the lowest round of the day, to open up a two-shot advantage. Behind him the leaderboard was bunched with seven players within three shots. Luke Donald, Nick Watney and overnight leader Hunter Mahan all had chances to match Johnson's score before faltering over the closing holes, while Martin Kaymer, in the final group, fell away after a 74.

Place	Player	Score	To par
1	(United States) Dustin Johnson	69-69-65=203	−13
T2	(England) Luke Donald	67-72-66=205	−11
T2	(United States) Matt Kuchar	68-69-68=205	−11
T2	(United States) Nick Watney	67-70-68=205	−11
T5	(United States) Hunter Mahan	64-71-71=206	−10
T5	(Northern Ireland) Rory McIlroy	68-69-69=206	−10
T5	(Italy) Francesco Molinari	68-68-70=206	−10
T5	(Australia) Adam Scott	68-70-68=206	−10
T9	(Republic of Ireland) Pádraig Harrington	68-71-68=207	−9
T9	(Scotland) Martin Laird	67-70-70=207	−9

=== Final round ===
Sunday, March 13, 2011

The final round began strongly for the American challengers, with Nick Watney, Hunter Mahan, Dustin Johnson and Matt Kuchar all getting under par early, while the international players struggled. As the leaders reached the turn, Doral's famous back nine began to bite, with a number of the leading players making bogeys and double bogeys. This opened the tournament back up to the field; ahead of the leaders, Anders Hansen was going low, but missed makeable birdie putts on 16 and 17 to settle for a 67 and 13-under. Meanwhile, Nick Watney holed long par putts at 13 and 15 to stay at 15-under, and shared the lead with Dustin Johnson going into the final stretch. But Johnson bogeyed 16, and when Watney birdied the tough 18 it left Johnson, in the final group, needing to hole his second shot to force a playoff; he hit it close, but eventually had to settle for a par, leaving Watney the winner by two. The low rounds on the final day were a pair of 66s by the young American Rickie Fowler, and former world number one Tiger Woods, a multiple winner of this event.

Place	Player	Score	To par	Money ($)
1	(United States) Nick Watney	67-70-68-67=272	−16	1,400,000
2	(United States) Dustin Johnson	69-69-65-71=274	−14	850,000
T3	(Denmark) Anders Hansen	71-69-68-67=275	−13	465,000
T3	(Italy) Francesco Molinari	68-68-70-69=275	−13	465,000
5	(United States) Matt Kuchar	68-69-68-71=276	−12	350,000
T6	(England) Luke Donald	67-72-66-72=277	−11	271,000
T6	(Australia) Adam Scott	68-70-68-71=277	−11	271,000
8	(United States) Rickie Fowler	71-73-68-66=278	−10	200,000
9	(United States) Hunter Mahan	64-71-71-73=279	−9	175,000
T10	(United States) Jonathan Byrd	70-74-68-68=280	−8	129,000
T10	(Republic of Ireland) Pádraig Harrington	68-71-68-73=280	−8	129,000
T10	(Scotland) Martin Laird	67-70-70-73=280	−8	129,000
T10	(Northern Ireland) Rory McIlroy	68-69-69-74=280	−8	129,000
T10	(United States) Tiger Woods	70-74-70-66=280	−8	129,000

==== Scorecard ====
Final round

Hole	1	2	3	4	5	6	7	8	9	10	11	12	13	14	15	16	17	18
Par	5	4	4	3	4	4	4	5	3	5	4	5	3	4	3	4	4	4
(United States) Watney	−12	−13	−13	−12	−12	−12	−12	−13	−14	−15	−14	−15	−15	−15	−15	−15	−15	−16
(United States) Johnson	−14	−14	−14	−14	−14	−14	−14	−14	−14	−14	−14	−14	−14	−15	−15	−14	−14	−14
(Denmark) Hansen	−9	−9	−9	−9	−9	−9	−9	−9	−9	−10	−10	−11	−12	−12	−13	−13	−13	−13
(Italy) Molinari	−10	−10	−9	−9	−9	−9	−10	−11	−12	−12	−12	−13	−12	−12	−13	−13	−13	−13
(United States) Kuchar	−12	−12	−13	−13	−14	−14	−13	−13	−13	−14	−13	−13	−12	−12	−12	−12	−12	−12
(England) Donald	−12	−12	−11	−11	−12	−12	−12	−13	−13	−13	−12	−12	−11	−11	−11	−11	−11	−11
(Australia) Scott	−11	−12	−11	−11	−11	−11	−11	−11	−11	−12	−12	−10	−10	−10	−10	−10	−11	−11
(United States) Fowler	−6	−7	−7	−7	−7	−8	−8	−9	−9	−10	−10	−10	−11	−10	−10	−10	−10	−10

Cumulative tournament scores, relative to par

Eagle	Birdie	Bogey	Double bogey
