= 2011 U.S. Open (golf) =

Coordinates: 38.996°N 77.176°W

Tournament information
- Dates: June 16–19, 2011
- Location: Bethesda, Maryland
- Courses: Congressional Country Club; Blue Course
- Organized by: USGA
- Tours: PGA Tour; European Tour; Japan Golf Tour

Statistics
- Par: 71
- Length: 7,574 yards (6,926 m)
- Field: 156, 72 after cut
- Cut: 146 (+4)
- Prize fund: $7,850,000 €5,633,541
- Winner's share: $1,440,000 €1,003,414

Champion
- (Northern Ireland) Rory McIlroy
- 268 (−16)

The 2011 United States Open Championship was the 111th U.S. Open, played June 16–19 at Congressional Country Club in Bethesda, Maryland, a suburb northwest of Washington, D.C. Rory McIlroy won his first major title, eight strokes ahead of Jason Day. He set eleven U.S. Open records on the weekend, including the lowest total 72-hole score (268) and the lowest total under par (−16). McIlroy and Robert Garrigus became the fifth and sixth in U.S. Open history to score under par in all four rounds.

== Venue ==
The 2011 U.S. Open was the third at Congressional Country Club. In 1997, Ernie Els of South Africa won his second U.S. Open at four under par, one stroke clear of Colin Montgomerie. The first U.S. Open at Congressional was in 1964; Ken Venturi defeated Tommy Jacobs by four shots in extreme heat and humidity. The 1964 Open was the last scheduled for three days, with 36 holes on Saturday. The course also hosted the PGA Championship in 1976.

=== Course layout ===
The 2011 U.S. Open at Congressional Country Club
Tee	Rating/Slope	1	2	3	4	5	6	7	8	9	Out	10	11	12	13	14	15	16	17	18	In	Total
Yardage	n/a	402	233	466	470	413	555	173	354	636	3,702	218	494	471	193	467	490	579	437	523	3,872	7,574
Par		4	3	4	4	4	5	3	4	5	36	3	4	4	3	4	4	5	4	4	35	71

Blue Course

== Field ==
Location in the United States
Location in Maryland

About half the field each year consists of players who are fully exempt from qualifying for the U.S. Open. The players who qualified for the 2011 U.S. Open are listed below. Each player is classified according to the first category in which he qualified, but other categories are shown in parentheses.

Two tweaks were made to the qualification categories for 2011. The number of players automatically exempted from the previous U.S. Open was reduced from the top 15 scorers plus ties to the top 10 plus ties. A new category was added, exempting the top 50 players on the Official World Golf Ranking list as of June 13, the last ranking issued before play starts (this is in addition to the top 50 on the same list as of May 22). This was the final year that the money lists on the various tours were used for exemption categories, as well as the multiple PGA Tour winner category (categories 9 and 11 to 16). In future years, the top 60 players in the Official World Golf Ranking, as of both three weeks prior to the tournament and immediately before play starts, received invitations.

1. Last 10 U.S. Open Champions

Ángel Cabrera (3), Michael Campbell, Jim Furyk (9,10,17,18), Lucas Glover, Retief Goosen (9,10,17,18), Graeme McDowell (8,11,17,18), Geoff Ogilvy (9,10,16,17,18)

- Tiger Woods (4,5,8,17,18) withdrew due to a knee injury.

2. Top two finishers in the 2010 U.S. Amateur

David Chung (a), Peter Uihlein (a)

3. Last five Masters Champions

Trevor Immelman, Zach Johnson (9,10,17,18), Phil Mickelson (8,9,10,12,17,18), Charl Schwartzel (11,14,17,18)

4. Last five British Open Champions

Stewart Cink, Pádraig Harrington (5,17), Louis Oosthuizen (11,17,18)

5. Last five PGA Champions

Martin Kaymer (8,11,14,17,18), Yang Yong-eun (17,18)

6. Last three Players Champions

K. J. Choi (10,12,17,18), Henrik Stenson

- Tim Clark (9,10,17,18) withdrew due to an elbow injury.

7. The U.S. Senior Open Champion

- Bernhard Langer did not play due to injury (thumb surgery).

8. Top 10 finishers and ties in the 2010 U.S. Open

Alex Čejka, Ernie Els (9,10,11,17,18), Grégory Havret, Dustin Johnson (9,10,17,18), Matt Kuchar (9,10,17,18), Davis Love III, Brandt Snedeker (17,18)

9. Top 30 leaders on the 2010 PGA Tour official money list

Robert Allenby (10,17,18), Paul Casey (10,11,17,18), Ben Crane (10,17,18), Jason Day (10,17,18), Luke Donald (10,11,12,14,17,18), Rickie Fowler (17,18), Bill Haas (17,18), Charley Hoffman (10), Anthony Kim, Hunter Mahan (10,17,18), Rory McIlroy (11,17,18), Jeff Overton (10), Ryan Palmer (10), Justin Rose (10,17,18), Adam Scott (10,17,18), Heath Slocum, Steve Stricker (10,13,17,18), Bo Van Pelt (10,17,18), Camilo Villegas (10), Nick Watney (10,12,17,18), Bubba Watson (10,12,13,17,18)

10. All players qualifying for the 2010 edition of The Tour Championship

Martin Laird (12,17,18), Ryan Moore (17,18), Kevin Na, Kevin Streelman

11. Top 15 on the 2010 European Tour Race to Dubai

Miguel Ángel Jiménez (17,18), Robert Karlsson (17,18), Francesco Molinari (17,18), Edoardo Molinari (17,18), Ian Poulter (17,18), Álvaro Quirós (14,17,18), Lee Westwood (17,18)

12. Top 10 on the 2011 PGA Tour official money list through May 22, 2011 (the Crowne Plaza Invitational at Colonial)

Aaron Baddeley (18), Rory Sabbatini (17,18), David Toms (17,18), Mark Wilson (13)

13. Winners of multiple PGA Tour events between the end of the 2010 U.S. Open and the start of the 2011 U.S. Open

Jonathan Byrd (17,18)

14. Top 5 from the 2011 European Tour Race to Dubai through May 22, 2011 (the Volvo World Match Play Championship and Madeira Islands Open)

- Anders Hansen (17,18) chose not to compete.

15. Top 2 on the 2010 Japan Golf Tour official money list, provided they are within the top 75 point leaders of the Official World Golf Ranking at the end of 2010

Hiroyuki Fujita, Kim Kyung-tae (17,18)

16. Top 2 on the 2010 PGA Tour of Australasia official money list, provided they are within the top 75 point leaders of the Official World Golf Ranking at the end of 2010

- Peter Senior, ranked 251st, did not qualify.

17. Top 50 on the Official World Golf Ranking list as of May 22, 2011

Peter Hanson (18), Ryo Ishikawa, Matteo Manassero (18)

18. Top 50 on the Official World Golf Ranking list as of June 13, 2011

Gary Woodland

19. Special exemptions selected by the USGA

None

Sectional qualifiers

- Japan: Kim Do-hoon, Scott Barr, Kim Dae-hyun, Kenichi Kuboya, Bae Sang-moon
- England: Nicolas Colsaerts, Robert Dinwiddie, Johan Edfors, Stephen Gallacher, Andreas Hartø, David Howell, Maarten Lafeber, Thomas Levet, Shane Lowry, Alex Norén, Robert Rock, Marcel Siem
- United States

- Glendale, California: Matthew Edwards (L), Beau Hossler (a), Steven Irwin (a,L), Brian Locke (L), Scott Pinckney (a,L)
- Vero Beach, Florida: Michael Barbosa (a,L), Joey Lamielle, Sam Saunders (L)
- Ball Ground, Georgia: Russell Henley (a), Ryan Nelson (L), Brett Patterson (a)
- St. Charles, Illinois: Brad Benjamin (a), Bennett Blakeman (L), Chris DeForest
- Rockville, Maryland: Bubba Dickerson (L), Fred Funk, Elliot Gealy (L), Christo Greyling (L), David May (L), Jon Mills, Michael Tobiason, Jr. (L), Kirk Triplett, Ty Tryon, Will Wilcox
- Tunica, Mississippi: Briny Baird, Chad Campbell, Bud Cauley (L), Sergio García, Brian Gay, Andres Gonzales (L), Freddie Jacobson, Kang Sung-hoon, Scott Piercy, Michael Putnam
- Summit, New Jersey: Pan Cheng-tsung (a), Matthew Richardson, Alexandre Rocha, Geoffrey Sisk
- Columbus, Ohio: Patrick Cantlay (a), Kevin Chappell, Robert Garrigus, Scott Hend, Justin Hicks, Brandt Jobe, Marc Leishman, Adam Long (L), Nick O'Hern, Tim Petrovic, D. A. Points, Chez Reavie, John Senden, Webb Simpson, Marc Turnesa, Chris Wilson (L)
- Springfield, Ohio: Jesse Hutchins (L), Noh Seung-yul
- Dallas, Texas: Greg Chalmers, Harrison Frazar, Todd Hamilton, Michael Smith (L)
- Bremerton, Washington: John Ellis (L), Adam Hadwin, Wes Heffernan (L), Chris Williams (a)

Alternates who gained entry

- Michael Whitehead (L, Dallas) – replaced Tiger Woods
- Jason Dufner (Georgia) – replaced Anders Hansen
- J. J. Henry (Columbus) – replaced Tim Clark
- Zack Byrd (L, Summit) – claimed spot held for category 13
- Brad Adamonis (L, Rockville) – claimed spot held for category 18

(a) denotes amateur
(L) denotes player advanced through local qualifying

== Round summaries ==
=== First round ===
Thursday, June 16, 2011

Overnight rain softened the fairways and greens and allowed for lower-than-average scoring for the first round of a U.S. Open. The man to take greatest advantage was Rory McIlroy, maintaining his good play in recent majors: he led after the first round of the 2010 Open Championship and after all of the first three rounds of the 2011 Masters Tournament, as well as finishing T-3rd in the 2010 PGA Championship. He carded a bogey-free 65 to sit at six-under-par, three ahead of two major winners: Y. E. Yang, the 2009 PGA champion, and Charl Schwartzel, who had beat McIlroy at the 2011 Masters and so was looking for his second straight major. The large group on two-under-par included a resurgent Sergio García, reigning Open champion Louis Oosthuizen, and several unexpected names, including journeymen Scott Hend and Alexandre Rocha. 22-year-old New Yorker Chris DeForest, playing in his first professional tournament, looked set to join them until double-bogeying his final hole for a 71. Defending champion Graeme McDowell was well-placed after an opening 70; he was alongside Robert Rock, who had only arrived on-site at 3am that morning after visa problems. However, the marquee group of Luke Donald, Lee Westwood and Martin Kaymer, numbers one, two and three in the world, all struggled, carding 74, 75 and 74 respectively. The leading amateurs were Peter Uihlein and Brad Benjamin, who were both at one-over-par.

Place	Player	Score	To par
1	(Northern Ireland) Rory McIlroy	65	−6
T2	(South Africa) Charl Schwartzel	68	−3
T2	(South Korea) Y. E. Yang	68	−3
T4	(Spain) Sergio García	69	−2
T4	(Australia) Scott Hend	69	−2
T4	(South Korea) Kim Kyung-tae	69	−2
T4	(South Africa) Louis Oosthuizen	69	−2
T4	(United States) Ryan Palmer	69	−2
T4	(Brazil) Alexandre Rocha	69	−2
T10	(United States) Stewart Cink	70	−1
T10	(United States) Bubba Dickerson	70	−1
T10	(Sweden) Johan Edfors	70	−1
T10	(United States) Robert Garrigus	70	−1
T10	(United States) Davis Love III	70	−1
T10	(Northern Ireland) Graeme McDowell	70	−1
T10	(Spain) Álvaro Quirós	70	−1
T10	(United States) Chez Reavie	70	−1
T10	(England) Robert Rock	70	−1
T10	(Australia) John Senden	70	−1
T10	(United States) Brandt Snedeker	70	−1
T10	(Sweden) Henrik Stenson	70	−1

=== Second round ===
Friday, June 17, 2011
Saturday, June 18, 2011

Rory McIlroy was the headline story once again on Friday, as he continued his good form, breaking several U.S. Open scoring records in the process. Out early in the morning session, he added an eagle two on the 8th hole to a succession of pars and birdies, and a two-putt birdie at the 16th took him to 12-under-par. This tied the record score under par for any player, at any point of the tournament in the history of the U.S. Open; Gil Morgan and Tiger Woods had previously achieved the feat, but having played only 34 holes at the time, McIlroy was the quickest to reach it. One hole later, another birdie made the Northern Irishman the first player in U.S. Open history to reach 13-under-par. An immediate double-bogey at the 18th – McIlroy's first dropped shots of the tournament – took him back to 11-under, and a second round of 66, but the record-breaking continued: his eventual six-shot lead was the joint largest after 36 holes in major championship history. McIlroy also set the record for fewest holes to reach 10-under-par, 26 holes, (13 fewer than the prior record) and lowest 36-hole total in U.S. Open history.

The man McIlroy led was South Korea's Y. E. Yang, who added a 69 to his opening 68 to sit on his own at five-under-par; he himself was three clear of the chasing pack. Sergio García's solid form continued, and he was in the group at two-under-par, as was the consistent Matt Kuchar after a 68. Further down the field, Germany's Marcel Siem tied for the low round of the day, matching McIlroy's 66 to surge up the field after a disappointing opening 79. Amateur Patrick Cantlay also hit a hot streak, shooting a back nine of 30 to complete a round of 67 and move to even par, tying for low amateur with Russell Henley. The premier group of Luke Donald, Lee Westwood and Martin Kaymer enjoyed a slightly better day, as all three battled hard to stay inside the cutline, with Westwood leading the three at one-over-par. Like all the afternoon starters, they were disrupted by a 42-minute delay in play as a thunderstorm passed over Congressional Country Club; this meant seven groups would need to return on Saturday morning to complete their rounds. After completion of the second round on Saturday morning, the cut fell at four-over-par, with 72 players getting through to the final two rounds.

Place	Player	Score	To par
1	(Northern Ireland) Rory McIlroy	65-66=131	−11
2	(South Korea) Y. E. Yang	68-69=137	−5
T3	(Spain) Sergio García	69-71=140	−2
T3	(United States) Robert Garrigus	70-70=140	−2
T3	(United States) Zach Johnson	71-69=140	−2
T3	(United States) Matt Kuchar	72-68=140	−2
T3	(United States) Brandt Snedeker	70-70=140	−2
T8	(United States) Brandt Jobe	71-70=141	−1
T8	(South Korea) Kim Kyung-tae	69-72=141	−1
T8	(United States) Davis Love III	70-71=141	−1
T8	(United States) Ryan Palmer	69-72=141	−1
T8	(Spain) Álvaro Quirós	70-71=141	−1
T8	(England) Robert Rock	70-71=141	−1
T8	(United States) Heath Slocum	71-70=141	−1

- Amateurs: Cantlay (E), Henley (E), Benjamin (+3), Williams (+7), Uihlein (+8), Pan (+10), Hossler (+11), Pinckney (+12), Irwin (+13), Patterson (+13), Chung (+15), Barbosa (+24)

=== Third round ===
Saturday, June 18, 2011

Conditions continued to allow good scoring on Saturday, with several players taking advantage. Rory McIlroy was in no mood to relinquish his lead, however. A steady front nine saw him make his way back to 13-under-par, after Friday's closing double-bogey, when he birdied the par-five 9th. Once again 13 proved to be McIlroy's unlucky number as he bogeyed the 10th hole, but he swiftly regained his composure to become the first man ever to reach 14-under-par at a U.S. Open, before parring his way home. Alongside him, former PGA champion Y. E. Yang scrambled well through a difficult front nine, and picked up two shots on his inward nine for a good 70, putting him in the final pairing once again on Sunday. Below him, Saturday began to live up to its "moving day" title. Jason Day, runner-up at the 2011 Masters Tournament, and world number two Lee Westwood surged through the field with best-of-the-day 65s to move into a tie for third and the penultimate pairing for Sunday; Westwood's third round playing partner Freddie Jacobson fared only one shot worse with a 66. This matched the low score amongst the early starters, made by major debutant Webb Simpson, whose 66 took him from the cutline to one-under-par, and the top 15.

Place	Player	Score	To par
1	(Northern Ireland) Rory McIlroy	65-66-68=199	−14
2	(South Korea) Y. E. Yang	68-69-70=207	−6
T3	(Australia) Jason Day	71-72-65=208	−5
T3	(United States) Robert Garrigus	70-70-68=208	−5
T3	(England) Lee Westwood	75-68-65=208	−5
T6	(Spain) Sergio García	69-71-69=209	−4
T6	(Sweden) Freddie Jacobson	74-69-66=209	−4
T6	(United States) Matt Kuchar	72-68-69=209	−4
9	(South Korea) Kim Kyung-tae	69-72-69=210	−3
T10	(United States) Brandt Jobe	71-70-70=211	−2
T10	(United States) Davis Love III	70-71-70=211	−2
T10	(United States) Heath Slocum	71-70-70=211	−2
T10	(Sweden) Henrik Stenson	70-72-69=211	−2
T10	(United States) Bo Van Pelt	76-67-68=211	−2

- Amateurs: Cantlay (−1), Henley (E), Benjamin (+12)

=== Final round ===
Sunday, June 19, 2011

Rory McIlroy began the final day eight shots clear of Y. E. Yang. McIlroy birdied the first hole and also went on to birdie the fourth. He missed the water hazard by a foot on the sixth hole, but still managed to make a par. At this point, Yang was two-under-par for the day but not challenging McIlroy. At the par-3 10th, Yang played first and hit his tee shot to four feet; McIlroy followed with an approach which caught the top of the slope behind the flag, and trickled down past Yang's ball to finish just inches away from the cup. This birdie moved McIlroy to a record-breaking 17-under-par for the tournament. A bogey on the 12th knocked him down to 16-under. On the par-5 16th, he got to 17-under again with a birdie but lost a shot with a bogey on the 17th green, his only three-putt of the tournament, finishing on 16-under. Two bogeys on the back nine saw Yang fall back into a tie for third place, with young Australian Jason Day moving into second place on his own; it was his second consecutive runner-up finish in the majors, in only his fourth major start; but he was a distant eight strokes behind McIlroy.

Rory McIlroy and Robert Garrigus accomplished the rare feat of shooting all four rounds of golf under par in a U.S. Open. This had occurred only four times previously in the history of the event. Yang would have joined this group were it not for a bogey on the 72nd hole. McIlroy also had the additional distinction of setting the U.S. Open 72-hole low marks for total shots and shots under par, at 268 and −16, respectively. McIlroy also became only the third golfer ever to shoot all four rounds under 70 at a U.S. Open, after Lee Trevino in 1968 and Lee Janzen in 1993.

Place	Player	Score	To par	Money ($)
1	(Northern Ireland) Rory McIlroy	65-66-68-69=268	−16	1,440,000
2	(Australia) Jason Day	71-72-65-68=276	−8	865,000
T3	(United States) Kevin Chappell	76-67-69-66=278	−6	364,241
T3	(United States) Robert Garrigus	70-70-68-70=278	−6	364,241
T3	(England) Lee Westwood	75-68-65-70=278	−6	364,241
T3	(South Korea) Y. E. Yang	68-69-70-71=278	−6	364,241
T7	(Spain) Sergio García	69-71-69-70=279	−5	228,416
T7	(Sweden) Peter Hanson	72-71-69-67=279	−5	228,416
T9	(South Africa) Louis Oosthuizen	69-73-71-67=280	−4	192,962
T9	(South Africa) Charl Schwartzel	68-74-72-66=280	−4	192,962

- Amateurs: Cantlay (E), Henley (+4), Benjamin (+21)

==== Scorecard ====
Final round

Hole	1	2	3	4	5	6	7	8	9	10	11	12	13	14	15	16	17	18
Par	4	3	4	4	4	5	3	4	5	3	4	4	3	4	4	5	4	4
(Northern Ireland) McIlroy	−15	−15	−15	−16	−16	−16	−16	−16	−16	−17	−17	−16	−16	−16	−16	−17	−16	−16
(Australia) Day	−5	−5	−5	−5	−5	−6	−6	−6	−6	−7	−7	−7	−7	−7	−7	−8	−8	−8
(United States) Chappell	−1	−1	E	E	E	−1	−1	−2	−3	−4	−3	−4	−5	−5	−5	−6	−6	−6
(United States) Garrigus	−4	−4	−4	−4	−3	−2	−2	−2	−2	−3	−3	−3	−4	−3	−4	−5	−6	−6
(England) Westwood	−6	−6	−6	−6	−6	−5	−5	−5	−6	−6	−5	−5	−5	−5	−5	−6	−6	−6
(South Korea) Yang	−6	−6	−6	−6	−6	−7	−7	−7	−8	−9	−8	−8	−8	−8	−7	−7	−7	−6

Cumulative tournament scores, relative to par

Birdie	Bogey
