= 2011 PGA Tour =

Golf tour season

2011 PGA Tour season
- Duration: January 6, 2011 – October 23, 2011
- Number of official events: 45
- Most wins: (United States) Keegan Bradley (2) (England) Luke Donald (2) (United States) Webb Simpson (2) (United States) Steve Stricker (2) (United States) Nick Watney (2) (United States) Bubba Watson (2) (United States) Mark Wilson (2)
- FedEx Cup: (United States) Bill Haas
- Money list: (England) Luke Donald
- PGA Tour Player of the Year: (England) Luke Donald
- PGA Player of the Year: (England) Luke Donald
- Rookie of the Year: (United States) Keegan Bradley

The 2011 PGA Tour was the 96th season of the PGA Tour, the main professional golf tour in the United States. It was also the 43rd season since separating from the PGA of America, and the fifth edition of the FedEx Cup.

== Changes for 2011 ==
The schedule was announced on December 2, 2010 and had four phases:

- Regular season: Consisted of 37 events (one less than in 2010) and started on January 6 with the limited-field Hyundai Tournament of Champions and ended with the Wyndham Championship on August 21.
- FedEx Cup Playoffs: As in previous seasons, this was a series of four tournaments. It started with The Barclays on August 25 and ended with the Tour Championship on September 25.
- Fall Series: After the Tour Championship, the principal portion of the season ended with a series of four tournaments (down from five in the previous season). These tournaments, generally passed on by elite players, offer an additional opportunity for players to secure their tour cards for the following season by finishing in the top 125 on the money list, or to gain a two-year exemption by winning a tournament with a slightly weaker field than usual.
- After the main season, the tour went into an Asia-Pacific swing consisting of four events, none of which offered official prize money.
  - The CIMB Asia Pacific Classic Malaysia, a limited-field event held in Malaysia that debuted in 2010.
  - The WGC-HSBC Champions, a World Golf Championships event held in China. Founded in 2005, it was elevated to WGC status in 2009, when it also became an event on the PGA Tour schedule. Although the prize money is unofficial, it now counts as an official PGA Tour win, if it is won by a PGA Tour member.
  - The 2011 Presidents Cup, a biennial team competition involving a United States side and an "International" side drawn from non-European players (European players play against the USA in the Ryder Cup). This was held in Melbourne, Australia.
  - The Omega Mission Hills World Cup, a team event featuring two-man teams from countries around the world and also held in China. This was the first World Cup of the event's new biennial schedule; it had been an annual event through 2009.

The regular season included all four major championships and three of the World Golf Championships events. All four majors and all four WGC events were also sanctioned by the European Tour.

In late 2009, after the 2010 schedule had been announced, it was noted by golf media that most of the Tour's contracts for sponsorship of individual tournaments were locked in through that season. However, it was speculated that the expiration of those sponsorship contracts in 2011 would see substantial changes in the PGA Tour landscape.

As it turned out, the 2011 schedule was largely the same as in 2010. The number of official money events was reduced by one with the demise of the Turning Stone Resort Championship, but the tour's total prize money remained virtually the same.

== Schedule ==
The following table lists official events during the 2011 season.

Date	Tournament	Location	Purse (US$)	Winner (Note: The number in parentheses after each winner's name is the number of PGA Tour events they had won up to and including that tournament. This information is only shown for PGA Tour members.)	OWGR points	Other tours (Note: ASA − Asian Tour.)	Notes
Jan 9	Hyundai Tournament of Champions	Hawaii	5,600,000	(United States) Jonathan Byrd (5)	50		Winners-only event
Jan 16	Sony Open in Hawaii	Hawaii	5,500,000	(United States) Mark Wilson (3)	48		
Jan 23	Bob Hope Classic	California	5,000,000	(Venezuela) Jhonattan Vegas (1)	32		Pro-Am
Jan 30	Farmers Insurance Open	California	5,800,000	(United States) Bubba Watson (2)	48		
Feb 7	Waste Management Phoenix Open	Arizona	6,100,000	(United States) Mark Wilson (4)	50		
Feb 13	AT&T Pebble Beach National Pro-Am	California	6,300,000	(United States) D. A. Points (1)	42		Pro-Am
Feb 20	Northern Trust Open	California	6,500,000	(Australia) Aaron Baddeley (3)	62		
Feb 27	WGC-Accenture Match Play Championship	Arizona	8,500,000	(England) Luke Donald (3)	76		World Golf Championship
Feb 27	Mayakoba Golf Classic	Mexico	3,700,000	(United States) Johnson Wagner (2)	24		Alternate event
Mar 6	The Honda Classic	Florida	5,700,000	(South Africa) Rory Sabbatini (6)	54		
Mar 13	WGC-Cadillac Championship	Florida	8,500,000	(United States) Nick Watney (3)	74		World Golf Championship
Mar 13	Puerto Rico Open	Puerto Rico	3,500,000	(United States) Michael Bradley (4)	24		Alternate event
Mar 20	Transitions Championship	Florida	5,500,000	(United States) Gary Woodland (1)	52		
Mar 27	Arnold Palmer Invitational	Florida	6,000,000	(Scotland) Martin Laird (2)	58		Invitational
Apr 3	Shell Houston Open	Texas	5,900,000	(United States) Phil Mickelson (39)	52		
Apr 10	Masters Tournament	Georgia	8,000,000	(South Africa) Charl Schwartzel (1)	100		Major championship
Apr 17	Valero Texas Open	Texas	6,200,000	(United States) Brendan Steele (1)	28		
Apr 24	The Heritage	South Carolina	5,700,000	(United States) Brandt Snedeker (2)	50		Invitational
May 1	Zurich Classic of New Orleans	Louisiana	6,400,000	(United States) Bubba Watson (3)	46		
May 8	Wells Fargo Championship	North Carolina	6,500,000	(United States) Lucas Glover (3)	58		
May 15	The Players Championship	Florida	9,500,000	(South Korea) K. J. Choi (8)	80		Flagship event
May 22	Crowne Plaza Invitational at Colonial	Texas	6,200,000	(United States) David Toms (13)	46		Invitational
May 29	HP Byron Nelson Championship	Texas	6,500,000	(United States) Keegan Bradley (1)	38		
Jun 5	Memorial Tournament	Ohio	6,200,000	(United States) Steve Stricker (10)	62		Invitational
Jun 12	FedEx St. Jude Classic	Tennessee	5,600,000	(United States) Harrison Frazar (1)	38		
Jun 19	U.S. Open	Maryland	8,000,000	(Northern Ireland) Rory McIlroy (2)	100		Major championship
Jun 26	Travelers Championship	Connecticut	6,000,000	(Sweden) Freddie Jacobson (1)	44		
Jul 3	AT&T National	Pennsylvania	6,200,000	(United States) Nick Watney (4)	44		Invitational
Jul 10	John Deere Classic	Illinois	4,500,000	(United States) Steve Stricker (11)	30		
Jul 17	The Open Championship	England	£5,000,000	(Northern Ireland) Darren Clarke (3)	100		Major championship
Jul 17	Viking Classic	Mississippi	3,600,000	(United States) Chris Kirk (1)	24		Alternate event
Jul 24	RBC Canadian Open	Canada	5,200,000	(United States) Sean O'Hair (4)	46		
Jul 31	Greenbrier Classic	West Virginia	6,000,000	(United States) Scott Stallings (1)	32		
Aug 7	WGC-Bridgestone Invitational	Ohio	8,500,000	(Australia) Adam Scott (8)	76		World Golf Championship
Aug 7	Reno–Tahoe Open	Nevada	3,000,000	(United States) Scott Piercy (1)	24		Alternate event
Aug 14	PGA Championship	Georgia	8,000,000	(United States) Keegan Bradley (2)	100		Major championship
Aug 21	Wyndham Championship	North Carolina	5,200,000	(United States) Webb Simpson (1)	38		
Aug 27	The Barclays	New Jersey	8,000,000	(United States) Dustin Johnson (5)	70		FedEx Cup playoff event
Sep 5	Deutsche Bank Championship	Massachusetts	8,000,000	(United States) Webb Simpson (2)	70		FedEx Cup playoff event
Sep 18	BMW Championship	Illinois	8,000,000	(England) Justin Rose (3)	66		FedEx Cup playoff event
Sep 25	Tour Championship	Georgia	8,000,000	(United States) Bill Haas (3)	54		FedEx Cup playoff event
Oct 2	Justin Timberlake Shriners Hospitals for Children Open	Nevada	4,400,000	(United States) Kevin Na (1)	24		Fall Series
Oct 9	Frys.com Open	California	5,000,000	(United States) Bryce Molder (1)	24		Fall Series
Oct 16	McGladrey Classic	Georgia	4,000,000	(United States) Ben Crane (4)	42		Fall Series
Oct 23	Children's Miracle Network Hospitals Classic	Florida	4,700,000	(England) Luke Donald (4)	32		Fall Series

=== Unofficial events ===
The following events were sanctioned by the PGA Tour, but did not carry FedEx Cup points or official money, nor were wins official.

Date	Tournament	Location	Purse ($)	Winner(s)	OWGR points	Other tours	Notes
Mar 15	Tavistock Cup	Florida	2,150,000	Team Lake Nona	n/a		Team event
Jun 21	CVS Caremark Charity Classic	Rhode Island	1,550,000	(United States) Zach Johnson and (United States) Matt Kuchar	n/a		Team event
Oct 19	PGA Grand Slam of Golf	Bermuda	1,350,000	(United States) Keegan Bradley	n/a		Limited-field event
Oct 30	CIMB Asia Pacific Classic Malaysia	Malaysia	6,100,000	(United States) Bo Van Pelt	30	ASA	Limited-field event
Nov 6	WGC-HSBC Champions	China	7,000,000	(Germany) Martin Kaymer	62		World Golf Championship
Nov 8	Wendy's 3-Tour Challenge	Nevada	1,000,000	Champions Tour	n/a		Team event
Nov 20	Presidents Cup	Australia	n/a	Team USA	n/a		Team event
Nov 27	Omega Mission Hills World Cup	China	7,500,000	(United States) Matt Kuchar and (United States) Gary Woodland	n/a		Team event
Dec 4	Chevron World Challenge	California	5,000,000	(United States) Tiger Woods	44		Limited-field event
Dec 11	Franklin Templeton Shootout	Florida	3,000,000	(United States) Keegan Bradley and (United States) Brendan Steele	n/a		Team event

== Location of tournaments ==
Location of official tournaments of the 2011 PGA Tour in the continental United States and Canada.
600-point event (Players & Majors)
550-point event (World Golf Championships)
500-point event (Regular events)
250-point event (Alternate events)
FedEx Cup playoff event
Fall Series event
Location of official tournaments of the 2011 PGA Tour outside the continental United States and Canada.
600-point event (Players & Majors)
500-point event (Regular events)
250-point event (Alternate events)

== FedEx Cup ==
=== Final standings ===
For full rankings, see 2011 FedEx Cup Playoffs.

Final top 10 players in the FedEx Cup:

Position	Player	Points	Bonus money ($)
1	(United States) Bill Haas	2,760	10,000,000
2	(United States) Webb Simpson	2,745	3,000,000
3	(England) Luke Donald	2,567	2,000,000
4	(United States) Dustin Johnson	2,488	1,500,000
5	(England) Justin Rose	2,253	1,000,000
6	(United States) Matt Kuchar	1,853	800,000
7	(United States) Hunter Mahan	1,800	700,000
8	(United States) Brandt Snedeker	1,668	600,000
9	(United States) Nick Watney	1,420	550,000
10	(United States) Chez Reavie	1,220	500,000

== Money list ==
The money list was based on prize money won during the season, calculated in U.S. dollars.

Position	Player	Prize money ($)
1	(England) Luke Donald	6,683,214
2	(United States) Webb Simpson	6,347,353
3	(United States) Nick Watney	5,290,673
4	(South Korea) K. J. Choi	4,434,691
5	(United States) Dustin Johnson	4,309,961
6	(United States) Matt Kuchar	4,233,920
7	(United States) Bill Haas	4,088,637
8	(United States) Steve Stricker	3,992,785
9	(Australia) Jason Day	3,962,647
10	(United States) David Toms	3,858,090

== Awards ==
Award	Winner	Ref.
PGA Tour Player of the Year (Jack Nicklaus Trophy)	(England) Luke Donald	
PGA Player of the Year	(England) Luke Donald	
Rookie of the Year	(United States) Keegan Bradley	
Scoring leader (PGA Tour – Byron Nelson Award)	(England) Luke Donald	
Scoring leader (PGA – Vardon Trophy)	(England) Luke Donald	

== See also ==
- 2011 in golf
- 2011 Champions Tour
- 2011 Nationwide Tour
