= Brad Benjamin =

American professional golfer

Personal information
- Nationality: United States
- Born: September 21, 1986 (age 40) Rockford, Illinois, U.S.
- Height: 5 ft 10 in (1.78 m)
- Weight: 160 lb (73 kg; 11 st)

Career
- Sport: Golf
- College: University of Memphis
- Turned professional: 2011
- Former tour: PGA Tour Canada
- Professional wins: 1

Best results in major championships
- Masters Tournament: CUT: 2010
- PGA Championship: DNP
- U.S. Open: 72nd: 2011
- The Open Championship: DNP

Brad Benjamin (born September 21, 1986) is an American professional golfer.

== Early life and amateur career ==
Benjamin was born in Rockford, Illinois. He had a successful amateur career while at the University of Memphis. In his freshman year of 2006, he finished tied third in the Conference USA golf championships. The following year he won his first collegiate tournament. In summer 2009, following his graduation, he won the U.S. Amateur Public Links, qualifying him for the following year's Masters Tournament. He finished 3rd in the 2010 Sunnehanna Amateur, 2nd in the Northeast Amateur, and he finished T-9 in the 2010 U.S. Amateur at Chambers Bay. He came through qualifying for the 2011 U.S. Open, and was one of three amateurs to make the cut.

== Professional career ==
In 2011, Benjamin turned professional. He qualified for PGA Tour Canada in 2016.

== Amateur wins ==
- 2006 Greater Rockford Open
- 2007 Palisades Collegiate Classic
- 2009 U.S. Amateur Public Links

== Professional wins ==
- 2009 Illinois Open (as an amateur)

== Results in major championships ==
Tournament	2010	2011
Masters Tournament	CUT	
U.S. Open		72

Note: Benjamin has only played in the Masters Tournament and U.S. Open

Did not play

CUT = missed the half-way cut
