= 2011 Masters Tournament =

American golf tournament held in 2011

- Front cover of the 2011 Masters Journal

Tournament information
- Dates: April 7–10, 2011
- Location: Augusta, Georgia; 33.503°N 82.020°W
- Course: Augusta National Golf Club
- Organized by: Augusta National Golf Club
- Tours: PGA Tour; European Tour; Japan Golf Tour

Statistics
- Par: 72
- Length: 7,435 yards (6,799 m)
- Field: 99 players, 49 after cut
- Cut: 145 (+1)
- Prize fund: US$8,000,000
- Winner's share: $1,440,000

Champion
- (South Africa) Charl Schwartzel
- 274 (−14)
- Location in the United States Location in Georgia

The 2011 Masters Tournament was the 75th Masters Tournament, held April 7–10 at Augusta National Golf Club. Charl Schwartzel birdied the final four holes to win his first major championship, two strokes ahead of runners-up Adam Scott and Jason Day.

Eight players held a share of the lead in the last round including Tiger Woods and Rory McIlroy. McIlroy had at least a share of the lead for the first three rounds and had a four stroke advantage entering Sunday's final round, but shot an 80 to finish ten strokes behind Schwartzel.

This was Ben Crenshaw's 40th consecutive Masters appearance. The top-ranked player in the world, Martin Kaymer, failed to make the cut, and Hideki Matsuyama was the only amateur to play on the weekend.

== Course ==
Hole	Name	Yards	Par	Hole	Name	Yards	Par
1	Tea Olive	445	4	10	Camellia	495	4
2	Pink Dogwood	575	5	11	White Dogwood	505	4
3	Flowering Peach	350	4	12	Golden Bell	155	3
4	Flowering Crab Apple	240	3	13	Azalea	510	5
5	Magnolia	455	4	14	Chinese Fir	440	4
6	Juniper	180	3	15	Firethorn	530	5
7	Pampas	450	4	16	Redbud	170	3
8	Yellow Jasmine	570	5	17	Nandina	440	4
9	Carolina Cherry	460	4	18	Holly	465	4
Out		3,725	36	In		3,710	36
Source:				Total		7,435	72

== Field ==
The Masters has the smallest field of the major championships. Officially the Masters remains an invitation event, but there is a set of qualifying criteria that determines who is included in the field. Each player is classified according to the first category by which he qualified, and other categories are shown in parentheses.

Golfers who qualify based solely on their performance in amateur tournaments (categories 6–10) must remain amateurs on the starting day of the tournament to be eligible to play.

1. Past Masters Champions
Ángel Cabrera (2), Fred Couples (11), Ben Crenshaw, Trevor Immelman (11), Zach Johnson (14,15,16,17,18,19), Sandy Lyle, Phil Mickelson (11,12,15,16,17,18,19), Larry Mize, José María Olazábal, Mark O'Meara, Vijay Singh, Craig Stadler, Tom Watson, Mike Weir, Tiger Woods (2,3,4,11,12,18,19), Ian Woosnam

(Past champions who did not play: Tommy Aaron, Seve Ballesteros, Jack Burke Jr., Billy Casper, Charles Coody, Nick Faldo, Raymond Floyd, Doug Ford, Bob Goalby, Bernhard Langer, Jack Nicklaus, Arnold Palmer, Gary Player, and Fuzzy Zoeller. Nicklaus and Palmer served as "honorary starters" and teed off on the first day at the first hole to kick off the tournament.)

2. Last five U.S. Open Champions
Lucas Glover, Graeme McDowell (12,16,18,19), Geoff Ogilvy (15,17,18,19)

3. Last five The Open Championship Champions
Stewart Cink (18), Pádraig Harrington (4,18,19), Louis Oosthuizen (13,16,18,19)

4. Last five PGA Champions
Martin Kaymer (12,14,16,18,19), Y. E. Yang (11,18,19)

5. Last three winners of The Players Championship
Tim Clark (15,16,17,18,19), Sergio García, Henrik Stenson (13)

6. Top two finishers in the 2010 U.S. Amateur
David Chung (a), Peter Uihlein (a)

7. Winner of the 2010 Amateur Championship
Jin Jeong (a)

8. Winner of the 2010 Asian Amateur
Hideki Matsuyama (a)

9. Winner of the 2010 U.S. Amateur Public Links
Lion Kim (a)

10. Winner of the 2010 U.S. Mid-Amateur
Nathan Smith (a)

11. The top 16 finishers and ties in the 2010 Masters Tournament
Ricky Barnes, K. J. Choi (17,18,19), Miguel Ángel Jiménez (18,19), Jerry Kelly, Anthony Kim (15,18,19), Hunter Mahan (15,16,17,18,19), Steve Marino, Ryan Moore (17,18,19), Ian Poulter (18,19), David Toms, Nick Watney (15,16,17,18,19), Lee Westwood (13,16,18,19)

12. Top 8 finishers and ties in the 2010 U.S. Open
Alex Čejka, Ernie Els (15,17,18,19), Grégory Havret, Dustin Johnson (15,16,17,18,19), Matt Kuchar (15,16,17,18,19), Davis Love III, Brandt Snedeker

13. Top 4 finishers and ties in the 2010 British Open Championship
Paul Casey (15,17,18,19), Rory McIlroy (14,15,16,18,19)

14. Top 4 finishers and ties in the 2010 PGA Championship
Bubba Watson (15,16,17,18,19)

15. Top 30 leaders on the 2010 PGA Tour official money earnings list
Robert Allenby (17,18,19), Ben Crane (17,18,19), Jason Day (16,17,18,19), Luke Donald (16,17,18,19), Rickie Fowler (18,19), Jim Furyk (16,17,18,19), Retief Goosen (17,18,19), Bill Haas (19), Charley Hoffman (16,17), Jeff Overton (17), Ryan Palmer (17), Justin Rose (16,17,18,19), Adam Scott (16,17,18,19), Heath Slocum, Steve Stricker (16,17,18,19), Bo Van Pelt (17,18,19), Camilo Villegas (17,18,19)

16. Winners of PGA Tour events that award a full-point allocation for the season-ending Tour Championship, between the 2010 Masters Tournament and the 2011 Masters Tournament
Stuart Appleby, Arjun Atwal, Aaron Baddeley, Jason Bohn, Jonathan Byrd, Martin Laird (17,18,19), Carl Pettersson, D. A. Points, Rory Sabbatini, Jhonattan Vegas, Mark Wilson (19), Gary Woodland

17. All players qualifying for the 2010 edition of The Tour Championship
Kevin Na, Kevin Streelman

18. Top 50 on the final 2010 Official World Golf Rankings list
Ross Fisher (19), Hiroyuki Fujita, Peter Hanson (19), Yuta Ikeda (19), Ryo Ishikawa (19), Robert Karlsson (19), Kim Kyung-tae (19), Edoardo Molinari (19), Francesco Molinari (19), Sean O'Hair, Álvaro Quirós (19), Charl Schwartzel (19)

19. Top 50 on the Official World Golf Rankings list on March 27, 2011
Anders Hansen

20. International invitees
None

== Round summaries ==
=== First round ===
Thursday, April 7, 2011

Rory McIlroy and Álvaro Quirós shot 65 to co-lead after the first round. K. J. Choi and Y. E. Yang shot 67 to trail by two shots. Defending champion Phil Mickelson shot a 70 and Tiger Woods a 71. Henrik Stenson struggled to an 83, including a quintuple bogey 8 on the par-3 4th hole, the highest score on the hole in the history of the Masters.

Place	Player	Score	To par
T1	(Northern Ireland) Rory McIlroy	65	−7
T1	(Spain) Álvaro Quirós	65	−7
T3	(South Korea) K. J. Choi	67	−5
T3	(South Korea) Y. E. Yang	67	−5
T5	(United States) Ricky Barnes	68	−4
T5	(United States) Matt Kuchar	68	−4
T7	(England) Ross Fisher	69	−3
T7	(Spain) Sergio García	69	−3
T7	(South Africa) Trevor Immelman	69	−3
T7	(Australia) Geoff Ogilvy	69	−3
T7	(South Africa) Charl Schwartzel	69	−3
T7	(United States) Brandt Snedeker	69	−3
T7	(United States) Gary Woodland	69	−3

=== Second round ===
Friday, April 8, 2011

McIlroy kept his lead with a 69 (−3), while Quirós shot a 73 (+1) to fall back to −6, four shots off the lead. Jason Day, in his first Masters appearance, shot a tournament-low 64 (−8) on Friday to move into second place. Tiger Woods shot a 66 to put himself back in the tournament at −7, three shots off the lead. Woods shot 31 on the back nine to charge up the leaderboard. K. J. Choi shot a 70 to move to −7, into third place along with Woods. Notable players who missed the cut were Graeme McDowell, Martin Kaymer, Pádraig Harrington, and Hunter Mahan.

Place	Player	Score	To par
1	(Northern Ireland) Rory McIlroy	65-69=134	−10
2	(Australia) Jason Day	72-64=136	−8
T3	(South Korea) K. J. Choi	67-70=137	−7
T3	(United States) Tiger Woods	71-66=137	−7
T5	(Australia) Geoff Ogilvy	69-69=138	−6
T5	(Spain) Álvaro Quirós	65-73=138	−6
T7	(United States) Ricky Barnes	68-71=139	−5
T7	(United States) Fred Couples	71-68=139	−5
T7	(United States) Rickie Fowler	70-69=139	−5
T7	(England) Lee Westwood	72-67=139	−5
T7	(South Korea) Y. E. Yang	67-72=139	−5

Amateurs: Matsuyama (+1), Chung (+4), Kim (+4), Uihlein (+5), Jeong (+6), Smith (+8).

=== Third round ===
Saturday, April 9, 2011

Rory McIlroy held at least a share of the lead for the third straight day. After playing the first 12 holes in one-over par, he birdied 13, 15 and 17 to gain a four shot lead. 2009 champion Ángel Cabrera stormed into second place with a 67 to play in the final pairing on Sunday for the second time in three years. Jason Day, who held the outright lead after hole 5, shot 72 and was also 4 shots back. Tiger Woods struggled to a 74 after a 66 on Friday. Cabrera, Bubba Watson and Adam Scott all shot 67, the round of the day.

Place	Player	Score	To par
1	(Northern Ireland) Rory McIlroy	65-69-70=204	−12
T2	(Argentina) Ángel Cabrera	71-70-67=208	−8
T2	(South Korea) K. J. Choi	67-70-71=208	−8
T2	(Australia) Jason Day	72-64-72=208	−8
T2	(South Africa) Charl Schwartzel	69-71-68=208	−8
T6	(England) Luke Donald	72-68-69=209	−7
T6	(Australia) Adam Scott	72-70-67=209	−7
8	(United States) Bo Van Pelt	73-69-68=210	−6
T9	(United States) Fred Couples	71-68-72=211	−5
T9	(England) Ross Fisher	69-71-71=211	−5
T9	(Australia) Geoff Ogilvy	69-69-73=211	−5
T9	(United States) Bubba Watson	73-71-67=211	−5
T9	(United States) Tiger Woods	71-66-74=211	−5

=== Final round ===
Sunday, April 10, 2011

==== Summary ====
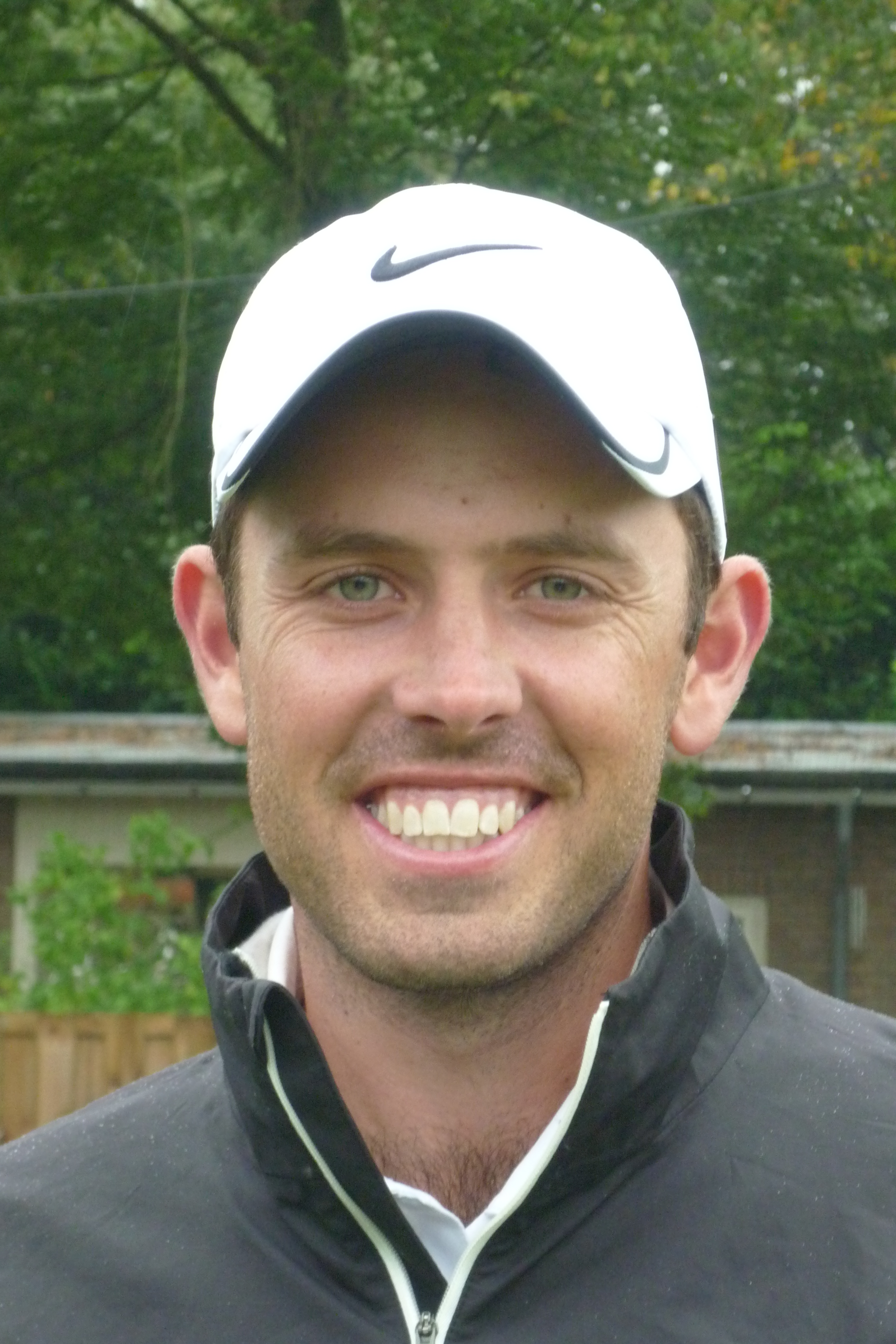
Charl Schwartzel won his first Masters title

External videos
- Full final round coverage on CBS on YouTube

Eight different players had at least a share of the lead at one point during the final round, included five simultaneously on the back nine. Rory McIlroy, the 54-hole leader, shot 37 on the front to hold a one-stroke lead heading into the back nine. However, he quickly fell out of contention after a wayward tee shot on 10 that led to a triple-bogey was immediately followed by a three-putt bogey on 11 from close range, and a four-putt double bogey on 12. He finished with a round of 80, and ten strokes back in a tie for 15th place. Tiger Woods, who was seven shots back to start the final round, shot 31 on the front nine, including an eagle at 8, to tie for the lead, but a three-putt bogey on 12 and a missed 5-foot (1.5 m) eagle putt on 15 doomed his chance at a fifth Masters title. Woods had previously never come from behind in the final round to win any of his 14 major championships. Geoff Ogilvy, also seven shots back to start the day, birdied 12 through 16 to share the lead, but came up short of his second major. K. J. Choi tied for the lead with a birdie at the 9th hole, but struggled putting on the back nine and finished in a tie for 8th. 2009 champion Ángel Cabrera also shared the lead but bogeys at 12 and 16 led to a solo 7th-place finish.

Adam Scott stormed up the leader board and after a birdie at 16 held a two shot lead. Jason Day made a 35-foot (11 m) birdie putt on 17 and another birdie on 18 to post −12, a share of the clubhouse lead with Scott. However, the day belonged to Charl Schwartzel, who chipped in for birdie at 1, holed out for eagle on 3, and birdied the final four holes to win by two shots; his 66 was the low round of the day. It was Schwartzel's first major win, and he became the third South African to win the Masters, along with Gary Player and Trevor Immelman. It was also the 50th anniversary of Player's 1961 Masters win, when he became the first international player to win the Masters.

==== Final leaderboard ====
Champion
Silver Cup winner (low amateur)
(a) = amateur
(c) = past champion

Top 10
Place	Player	Score	To par	Money (US$)
1	(South Africa) Charl Schwartzel	69-71-68-66=274	−14	1,440,000
T2	(Australia) Jason Day	72-64-72-68=276	−12	704,000
T2	(Australia) Adam Scott	72-70-67-67=276	−12	704,000
T4	(England) Luke Donald	72-68-69-69=278	−10	330,667
T4	(Australia) Geoff Ogilvy	69-69-73-67=278	−10	330,667
T4	(United States) Tiger Woods (c)	71-66-74-67=278	−10	330,667
7	(Argentina) Ángel Cabrera (c)	71-70-67-71=279	−9	268,000
T8	(South Korea) K. J. Choi	67-70-71-72=280	−8	240,000
T8	(United States) Bo Van Pelt	73-69-68-70=280	−8	240,000
10	(United States) Ryan Palmer	71-72-69-70=282	−6	216,000

Leaderboard below the top 10
Place	Player	Score	To par	Money ($)
T11	(Italy) Edoardo Molinari	74-70-69-70=283	−5	176,000
T11	(England) Justin Rose	73-71-71-68=283	−5	176,000
T11	(United States) Steve Stricker	72-70-71-70=283	−5	176,000
T11	(England) Lee Westwood	72-67-74-70=283	−5	176,000
T15	(United States) Fred Couples (c)	71-68-72-73=284	−4	128,000
T15	(England) Ross Fisher	69-71-71-73=284	−4	128,000
T15	(South Africa) Trevor Immelman (c)	69-73-73-69=284	−4	128,000
T15	(Northern Ireland) Rory McIlroy	65-69-70-80=284	−4	128,000
T15	(United States) Brandt Snedeker	69-71-74-70=284	−4	128,000
T20	(United States) Ricky Barnes	68-71-75-71=285	−3	93,200
T20	(Japan) Ryo Ishikawa	71-71-73-70=285	−3	93,200
T20	(Scotland) Martin Laird	74-69-69-73=285	−3	93,200
T20	(South Korea) Yang Yong-eun	67-72-73-73=285	−3	93,200
T24	(United States) Jim Furyk	72-68-74-72=286	−2	70,400
T24	(United States) David Toms	72-69-73-72=286	−2	70,400
T24	(United States) Gary Woodland	69-73-74-70=286	−2	70,400
T27	(United States) Charley Hoffman	74-69-72-72=287	−1	54,400
T27	(Spain) Miguel Ángel Jiménez	71-73-70-73=287	−1	54,400
T27	(Sweden) Robert Karlsson	72-70-74-71=287	−1	54,400
T27	(United States) Matt Kuchar	68-75-69-75=287	−1	54,400
T27	(Japan) Hideki Matsuyama (a)	72-73-68-74=287	−1	0
T27	(United States) Phil Mickelson (c)	70-72-71-74=287	−1	54,400
T27	(England) Ian Poulter	74-69-71-73=287	−1	54,400
T27	(Spain) Álvaro Quirós	65-73-75-74=287	−1	54,400
T35	(Germany) Alex Čejka	72-71-75-70=288	E	43,200
T35	(Spain) Sergio García	69-71-75-73=288	E	43,200
T35	(United States) Ryan Moore	70-73-72-73=288	E	43,200
T38	(England) Paul Casey	70-72-76-71=289	+1	36,800
T38	(United States) Rickie Fowler	70-69-76-74=289	+1	36,800
T38	(United States) Dustin Johnson	74-68-73-74=289	+1	36,800
T38	(United States) Bubba Watson	73-71-67-78=289	+1	36,800
T42	(United States) Bill Haas	74-70-74-72=290	+2	32,000
T42	(United States) Steve Marino	74-71-72-73=290	+2	32,000
T44	(South Korea) Kim Kyung-tae	70-75-78-68=291	+3	28,800
T44	(United States) Jeff Overton	73-72-72-74=291	+3	28,800
46	(United States) Nick Watney	72-72-75-73=292	+4	26,400
T47	(Australia) Aaron Baddeley	75-70-74-74=293	+5	24,000
T47	(South Africa) Ernie Els	75-70-76-72=293	+5	24,000
49	(Colombia) Camilo Villegas	70-75-73-76=294	+6	21,920
CUT	(Australia) Robert Allenby	75-71=146	+2	
CUT	(United States) Stewart Cink	71-75=146	+2	
CUT	(South Africa) Tim Clark	73-73=146	+2	
CUT	(United States) Lucas Glover	75-71=146	+2	
CUT	(United States) Zach Johnson (c)	73-73=146	+2	
CUT	(United States) Anthony Kim	73-73=146	+2	
CUT	(United States) Hunter Mahan	75-71=146	+2	
CUT	(Italy) Francesco Molinari	75-71=146	+2	
CUT	(United States) Sean O'Hair	70-76=146	+2	
CUT	(Australia) Stuart Appleby	75-72=147	+3	
CUT	(United States) Jerry Kelly	74-73=147	+3	
CUT	(Northern Ireland) Graeme McDowell	74-73=147	+3	
CUT	(United States) Kevin Na	73-74=147	+3	
CUT	(United States) Mark Wilson	76-71=147	+3	
CUT	(United States) Jason Bohn	73-75=148	+4	
CUT	(United States) David Chung (a)	72-76=148	+4	
CUT	(United States) Ben Crane	73-75=148	+4	
CUT	(South Africa) Retief Goosen	70-78=148	+4	
CUT	(Sweden) Peter Hanson	72-76=148	+4	
CUT	(Japan) Yuta Ikeda	74-74=148	+4	
CUT	(United States) Lion Kim (a)	76-72=148	+4	
CUT	(Sweden) Carl Pettersson	75-73=148	+4	
CUT	(United States) D. A. Points	72-76=148	+4	
CUT	(United States) Heath Slocum	72-76=148	+4	
CUT	(Venezuela) Jhonattan Vegas	72-76=148	+4	
CUT	(Japan) Hiroyuki Fujita	70-79=149	+5	
CUT	(Denmark) Anders Hansen	72-77=149	+5	
CUT	(Republic of Ireland) Pádraig Harrington	77-72=149	+5	
CUT	(France) Grégory Havret	70-79=149	+5	
CUT	(South Africa) Louis Oosthuizen	75-74=149	+5	
CUT	(United States) Kevin Streelman	75-74=149	+5	
CUT	(United States) Peter Uihlein (a)	72-77=149	+5	
CUT	(South Korea) Jin Jeong (a)	73-77=150	+6	
CUT	(Germany) Martin Kaymer	78-72=150	+6	
CUT	(United States) Larry Mize (c)	73-77=150	+6	
CUT	(Spain) José María Olazábal (c)	73-77=150	+6	
CUT	(United States) Mark O'Meara (c)	77-73=150	+6	
CUT	(South Africa) Rory Sabbatini	74-76=150	+6	
CUT	(India) Arjun Atwal	80-71=151	+7	
CUT	(United States) Jonathan Byrd	73-78=151	+7	
CUT	(United States) Craig Stadler (c)	80-71=151	+7	
CUT	(United States) Tom Watson (c)	79-72=151	+7	
CUT	(United States) Davis Love III	75-77=152	+8	
CUT	(United States) Nathan Smith (a)	75-77=152	+8	
CUT	(Scotland) Sandy Lyle (c)	73-80=153	+9	
CUT	(Fiji) Vijay Singh (c)	76-78=154	+10	
CUT	(United States) Ben Crenshaw (c)	78-77=155	+11	
CUT	(Canada) Mike Weir (c)	76-79=155	+11	
CUT	(Wales) Ian Woosnam (c)	78-77=155	+11	
CUT	(Sweden) Henrik Stenson	83-74=157	+13	

==== Scorecard ====
Hole	1	2	3	4	5	6	7	8	9	10	11	12	13	14	15	16	17	18
Par	4	5	4	3	4	3	4	5	4	4	4	3	5	4	5	3	4	4
(South Africa) Schwartzel	−9	−9	−11	−10	−10	−10	−10	−10	−10	−10	−10	−10	−10	−10	−11	−12	−13	−14
(Australia) Day	−7	−8	−8	−8	−8	−8	−7	−8	−8	−8	−8	−9	−10	−10	−10	−10	−11	−12
(Australia) Scott	−7	−8	−8	−8	−7	−8	−8	−9	−9	−9	−10	−10	−10	−11	−11	−12	−12	−12
(England) Donald	−7	−8	−8	−8	−8	−8	−7	−8	−8	−9	−9	−7	−8	−8	−9	−10	−9	−10
(Australia) Ogilvy	−5	−6	−5	−4	−4	−4	−4	−5	−5	−5	−5	−6	−7	−8	−9	−10	−10	−10
(United States) Woods	−5	−6	−7	−6	−6	−7	−8	−10	−10	−10	−10	−9	−9	−9	−10	−10	−10	−10
(Argentina) Cabrera	−8	−9	−8	−8	−8	−8	−9	−10	−10	−10	−10	−9	−9	−9	−10	−9	−9	−9
(Northern Ireland) McIlroy	−11	−11	−11	−11	−10	−10	−11	−11	−11	−8	−7	−5	−5	−5	−4	−4	−4	−4

Cumulative tournament scores, relative to par

Eagle	Birdie	Bogey	Double bogey	Triple bogey+
