= Charl Schwartzel =

South African professional golfer (born 1984)

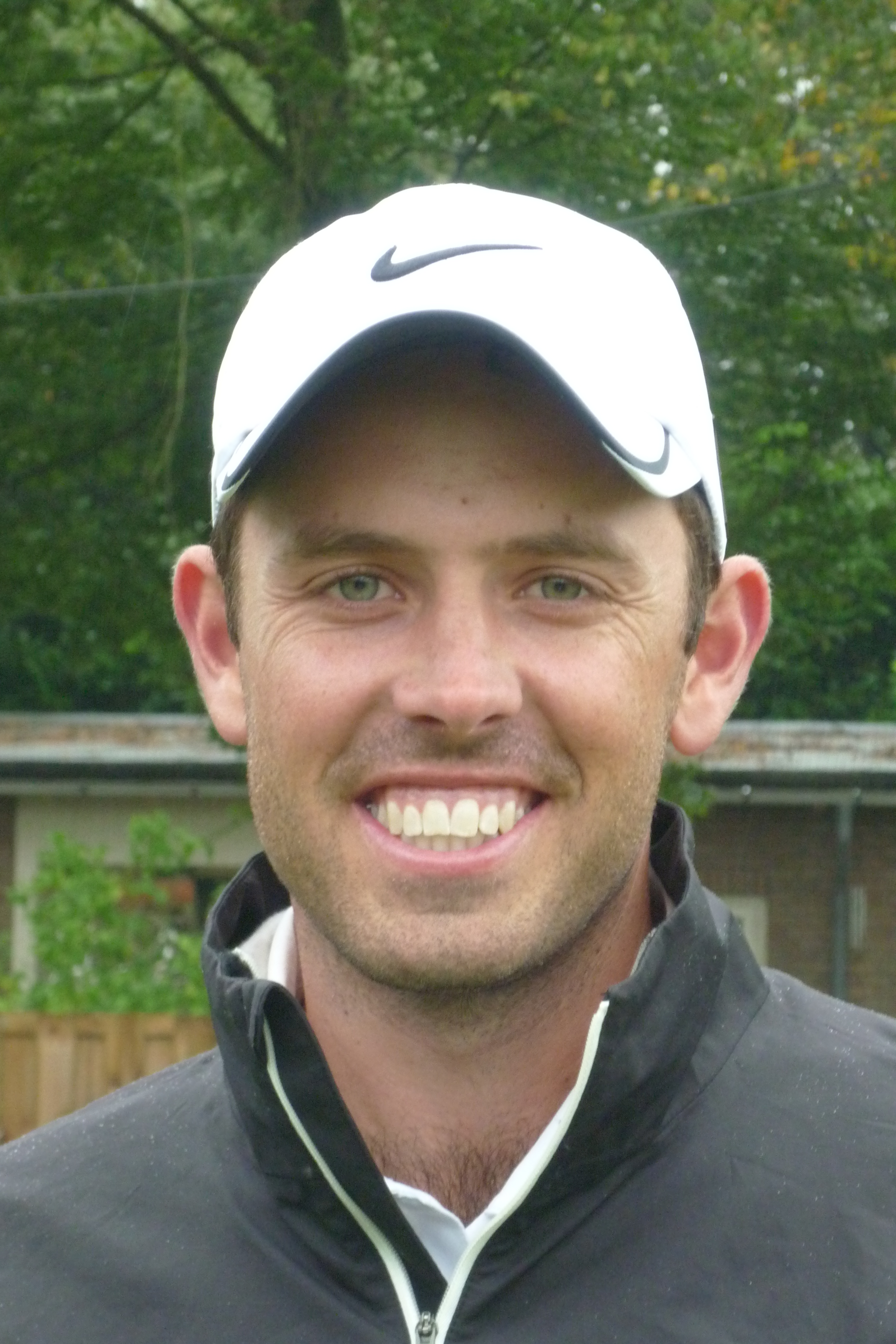
- Schwartzel in 2010

Personal information
- Full name: Charl Adriaan Schwartzel
- Nationality: South Africa
- Born: 31 August 1984 (age 42) Johannesburg, South Africa
- Height: 1.80 m (5 ft 11 in)
- Weight: 72 kg (159 lb; 11.3 st)
- Spouse: Rosalind Jacobs (m. 2010)

Career
- Sport: Golf
- Turned professional: 2002
- Current tours: Asian Tour; Sunshine Tour; LIV Golf
- Former tours: PGA Tour; European Tour
- Professional wins: 16
- Highest ranking: 6 (11 March 2012)

Number of wins by tour
- PGA Tour: 2
- European Tour: 11
- Asian Tour: 1
- Sunshine Tour: 9
- LIV Golf: 1
- Other: 1

Best results in major championships (wins: 1)
- Masters Tournament: Won: 2011
- PGA Championship: T12: 2011
- U.S. Open: 7th: 2015
- The Open Championship: T7: 2014

Achievements and awards
- Sunshine Tour Rookie of the Year: 2002–03
- Sunshine Tour Order of Merit Winner: 2004–05, 2005–06, 2006–07, 2010

Charl Adriaan Schwartzel (/ʃɑːrl ˈʃwɔːrtsəl/ sharl SHWORT-səl; born 31 August 1984) is a South African professional golfer who currently plays in the LIV Golf Invitational Series and has previously played on the PGA Tour, European Tour and the Sunshine Tour. He has won one major title, the Masters in 2011. Schwartzel's highest world ranking has been number six, after finishing in a tie for fourth at the WGC-Cadillac Championship in 2012.

== Early life and amateur career ==
Born in Johannesburg, Schwartzel had a dominant junior amateur career in South Africa, and won some amateur events in other countries including the 2002 Indian Amateur and English Open Stroke Play Championships. He played for South Africa in the 2002 Eisenhower Trophy.

== Professional career ==
Schwartzel turned professional at the age of eighteen and following the path of many other leading South African players, he qualified for the European Tour late that year. He was the second youngest South African golfer to do so after Dale Hayes. He earned enough money to retain his European Tour card in both 2003 and 2004.

In the 2005 season he won the Dunhill Championship, a leading tournament in South Africa that is co-sanctioned by the European Tour, and claimed first place on the Sunshine Tour's Order of Merit. In 2005 he finished 52nd on the European Tour's Order of Merit, and in 2005-06 he again topped the Sunshine Tour Order of Merit. His win at the season-ending Vodacom Tour Championship took him into the top 100 in the Official World Golf Rankings for the first time. His form continued to improve in 2006 and he finished the season placed 18th on the Order of Merit and reached as high as 55th in the World Rankings.

He took first place on the Sunshine Tour Order of Merit for the third consecutive year in 2007, and won the Open de España in April, beating Jyoti Randhawa by one stroke, after an eagle at the 543-yard (497 m) par-5 16th hole, and moved into the world top 40.

Schwartzel has played in the Gary Player Invitational several times to help Gary Player raise funds for various children's charities. In 2008, he once again achieved success on the European Tour, by securing victory at the Madrid Masters.

After a winless 2009 season, Schwartzel started 2010 by winning two consecutive tournaments on the European Tour, both held in his native South Africa, and re-entered the top 50 of the Official World Golf Rankings. He finished the season ranked 8th on the Order of Merit.

For 2011, Schwartzel joined the PGA Tour. On 16 January 2011, Schwartzel retained his Joburg Open title winning by four shots.

=== 2011 Masters win ===
Schwartzel won the Masters Tournament in 2011 by two strokes to become the third South African winner of the event (after Gary Player and Trevor Immelman). He won exactly 50 years after Player became the first international Masters champion in 1961. In the final round, Schwartzel overcame a four stroke deficit with a round of 66, two strokes ahead of runners-up Adam Scott and Jason Day

Schwartzel started his final round on Sunday by chipping in from off the green at the first hole for birdie and then holed his second shot from the middle of the fairway at the third for eagle. This wiped out the four stroke lead of Rory McIlroy and then he bogeyed the fourth hole to drop one behind. For the rest of the round he maintained this score, until he reached the last four holes where he holed clutch putts to finish with four consecutive birdies, a feat unprecedented in the Masters' 75 years history. It put him back in the lead and he ultimately won the Green Jacket and his first major championship. After the tournament, Schwartzel moved up to 11th from 29th in the Official World Golf Rankings.

=== Post-Masters win career ===
Alongside his win at The Masters, Schwartzel also enjoyed success in the year's other three major championships in 2011. He recorded career bests at the U.S. Open where he finished in a tie for ninth and also at the PGA Championship, finishing tied for 12th. He was also in contention at The Open Championship before a third round 75 damaged his chances. He ended the season ranked 4th on the Race to Dubai.

On 9 December 2012, Schwartzel won the Thailand Golf Championship on the Asian Tour for his first victory since his 2011 Masters win. This was also Schwartzel's first win on the Asian Tour as he cruised to an eleven stroke victory over the field. The following week, Schwartzel won in his native South Africa at the Alfred Dunhill Championship played at Leopard Creek CC.

This was Schwartzel's eighth victory on the European Tour, as he secured it with the third highest margin of victory in the history of the tour with a twelve stroke advantage over the Swede Kristoffer Broberg.

Schwartzel defended his Alfred Dunhill Championship in 2013, with a four-stroke win over England's Richard Finch. This took his tally of victories on the European Tour to nine.

Schwartzel won his second PGA Tour event, on 13 March 2016, taking the Valspar Championship on the first hole of sudden-death, after tying Bill Haas at 277 after 72 holes.

On May 31, 2022, it was revealed that Schwartzel would be participating in the first event of the Saudi-backed LIV Golf tour. Schwartzel would end up resigning his PGA Tour membership. On June 9, Schwartzel along with 16 others, were suspended by the PGA Tour. Since he resigned his membership before the first event, Schwartzel is no longer eligible to compete in PGA Tour events or the Presidents Cup.

In June 2022, Schwartzel won the inaugural LIV Golf tournament, the LIV Golf Invitational London, by one stroke over Hennie du Plessis. His team, consisting of himself, du Plessis, Branden Grace and Louis Oosthuizen, won the team portion of the event by fourteen strokes.

== Amateur wins ==
- 2002 Indian Amateur Open Championship (tied), Brabazon Trophy, Transvaal Amateur Championship (South Africa)

== Professional wins (16) ==
=== PGA Tour wins (2) ===
Legend
Major championships (1)
Other PGA Tour (1)

No.	Date	Tournament	Winning score	Margin of victory	Runner(s)-up
1	10 Apr 2011	Masters Tournament	−14 (69-71-68-66=274)	2 strokes	(Australia) Jason Day, (Australia) Adam Scott
2	13 Mar 2016	Valspar Championship	−7 (71-70-69-67=277)	Playoff	(United States) Bill Haas

PGA Tour playoff record (1–1)

No.	Year	Tournament	Opponent(s)	Result
1	2016	Valspar Championship	(United States) Bill Haas	Won with par on first extra hole
2	2021	Zurich Classic of New Orleans (with (South Africa) Louis Oosthuizen)	(Australia) Marc Leishman and (Australia) Cameron Smith	Lost to par on first extra hole

=== European Tour wins (11) ===
Legend
Major championships (1)
Other European Tour (10)

No.	Date	Tournament	Winning score	Margin of victory	Runner(s)-up
1	12 Dec 2004 (2005 season)	Dunhill Championship^{1}	−7 (71-69-70-71=281)	Playoff	(England) Neil Cheetham
2	29 Apr 2007	Open de España	−16 (69-68-68-67=272)	1 stroke	(India) Jyoti Randhawa
3	12 Oct 2008	Madrid Masters	−19 (69-64-66-66=265)	3 strokes	(Argentina) Ricardo González
4	10 Jan 2010	Africa Open^{1}	−20 (67-70-68-67=272)	1 stroke	(South Africa) Thomas Aiken
5	17 Jan 2010	Joburg Open^{1}	−23 (63-68-64-66=261)	6 strokes	(Northern Ireland) Darren Clarke, (South Africa) Keith Horne
6	16 Jan 2011	Joburg Open^{1} (2)	−19 (68-61-69-67=265)	1 stroke	(South Africa) Garth Mulroy
7	10 Apr 2011	Masters Tournament	−14 (69-71-68-66=274)	2 strokes	(Australia) Jason Day, (Australia) Adam Scott
8	16 Dec 2012 (2013 season)	Alfred Dunhill Championship^{1} (2)	−24 (67-64-64-69=264)	12 strokes	(Sweden) Kristoffer Broberg
9	1 Dec 2013 (2014 season)	Alfred Dunhill Championship^{1} (3)	−17 (68-68-67-68=271)	4 strokes	(England) Richard Finch
10	29 Nov 2015 (2016 season)	Alfred Dunhill Championship^{1} (4)	−15 (66-67-70-70=273)	4 strokes	(France) Grégory Bourdy
11	14 Feb 2016	Tshwane Open^{1}	−16 (71-64-66-63=264)	8 strokes	(Denmark) Jeff Winther

^{1}Co-sanctioned by the Sunshine Tour

European Tour playoff record (1–1)

No.	Year	Tournament	Opponent	Result
1	2004	Dunhill Championship	(England) Neil Cheetham	Won with birdie on first extra hole
2	2015	South African Open Championship	(England) Andy Sullivan	Lost to birdie on first extra hole

=== Asian Tour wins (1) ===
Legend
Flagship events (1)
Other Asian Tour (0)

No.	Date	Tournament	Winning score	Margin of victory	Runners-up
1	9 Dec 2012	Thailand Golf Championship	−25 (65-65-68-65=263)	11 strokes	(Thailand) Thitiphun Chuayprakong, (United States) Bubba Watson

=== Sunshine Tour wins (9) ===
Legend
Tour Championships (1)
Other Sunshine Tour (8)

No.	Date	Tournament	Winning score	Margin of victory	Runner(s)-up
1	12 Dec 2004	Dunhill Championship^{1}	−7 (71-69-70-71=281)	Playoff	(England) Neil Cheetham
2	26 Feb 2006	Vodacom Tour Championship	−14 (68-70-65-67=270)	4 strokes	(South Africa) Darren Fichardt
3	10 Jan 2010	Africa Open^{1}	−20 (67-70-68-67=272)	1 stroke	(South Africa) Thomas Aiken
4	17 Jan 2010	Joburg Open^{1}	−23 (63-68-64-66=261)	6 strokes	(Northern Ireland) Darren Clarke, (South Africa) Keith Horne
5	16 Jan 2011	Joburg Open^{1} (2)	−19 (68-61-69-67=265)	1 stroke	(South Africa) Garth Mulroy
6	16 Dec 2012	Alfred Dunhill Championship^{1} (2)	−23 (67-64-64-69-264)	12 strokes	(Sweden) Kristoffer Broberg
7	1 Dec 2013	Alfred Dunhill Championship^{1} (3)	−17 (68-68-67-68=271)	4 strokes	(England) Richard Finch
8	29 Nov 2015	Alfred Dunhill Championship^{1} (4)	−15 (66-67-70-70=273)	4 strokes	(France) Grégory Bourdy
9	14 Feb 2016	Tshwane Open^{1}	−16 (71-64-66-63=264)	8 strokes	(Denmark) Jeff Winther

^{1}Co-sanctioned by the European Tour

Sunshine Tour playoff record (1–1)

No.	Year	Tournament	Opponent	Result
1	2004	Dunhill Championship	(England) Neil Cheetham	Won with birdie on first extra hole
2	2015	South African Open Championship	(England) Andy Sullivan	Lost to birdie on first extra hole

=== OneAsia Tour wins (1) ===
No.	Date	Tournament	Winning score	Margin of victory	Runners-up
1	13 Oct 2013	Nanshan China Masters	−9 (71-72-68-68=279)	1 stroke	(Northern Ireland) Darren Clarke, (China) Liang Wenchong

=== LIV Golf Invitational Series wins (1) ===
No.	Date	Tournament	Winning score	Margin of victory	Runner-up
1	11 Jun 2022	LIV Golf Invitational London	−7 (65-66-72=203)	1 stroke	(South Africa) Hennie du Plessis

== Major championships ==
=== Wins (1) ===
Year	Championship	54 holes	Winning score	Margin	Runners-up
2011	Masters Tournament	4 shot deficit	−14 (69-71-68-66=274)	2 strokes	(Australia) Jason Day, (Australia) Adam Scott

=== Results timeline ===
Results not in chronological order in 2020.

Tournament	2003	2004	2005	2006	2007	2008	2009
Masters Tournament							
U.S. Open				T48	T30		CUT
The Open Championship	CUT		CUT	T22	CUT		CUT
PGA Championship				CUT	CUT	T52	T43

Tournament	2010	2011	2012	2013	2014	2015	2016	2017	2018
Masters Tournament	T30	1	T50	T25	CUT	T38	CUT	3	CUT
U.S. Open	T16	T9	T38	14	CUT	7	T23	CUT	CUT
The Open Championship	T14	T16	CUT	T15	T7	T68	T18	T62	CUT
PGA Championship	T18	T12	T59	CUT	T15	T37	T42	T48	T42

Tournament	2019	2020	2021	2022	2023	2024	2025	2026
Masters Tournament	CUT	T25	T26	T10	T50	CUT	T36	54
PGA Championship		T58	CUT	T60				
U.S. Open			T19					
The Open Championship		NT			CUT			

Win
Top 10
Did not play

CUT = missed the half-way cut
"T" = tied
NT = No tournament due to COVID-19 pandemic

=== Summary ===
Tournament	Wins	2nd	3rd	Top-5	Top-10	Top-25	Events	Cuts made
Masters Tournament	1	0	1	2	3	5	17	12
PGA Championship	0	0	0	0	0	3	16	12
U.S. Open	0	0	0	0	2	6	13	9
The Open Championship	0	0	0	0	1	6	15	8
Totals	1	0	1	2	6	20	61	41

- Most consecutive cuts made – 11 (2009 PGA – 2012 U.S. Open)
- Longest streak of top-10s – 2 (2011 Masters – 2011 U.S. Open)

== Results in The Players Championship ==
Tournament	2007	2008	2009
The Players Championship	T58		

Tournament	2010	2011	2012	2013	2014	2015	2016	2017	2018	2019
The Players Championship	CUT	T26		T55	T48	T51		CUT	T2	CUT

Tournament	2020	2021	2022
The Players Championship	C	CUT	CUT

Top 10
Did not play

CUT = missed the halfway cut
"T" indicates a tie for a place
C = Cancelled after the first round due to the COVID-19 pandemic

== Results in World Golf Championships ==
Results not in chronological order prior to 2015.

Tournament	2005	2006	2007	2008	2009	2010	2011	2012	2013	2014	2015	2016	2017	2018
Championship	T18	T43	T35			2	T24	T4	T16	T9	T44	T17	T38	T48
Match Play					R32	R16	R32	R32	R64	R32	R16	T18	T17	T36
Invitational		T36				T58	T53	T24	T21	T4	T31	T7	T24	T31
Champions						T16	T4			T64	T35	T30	T50	

Top 10
Did not play

QF, R16, R32, R64 = Round in which player lost in match play
"T" = tied
Note that the HSBC Champions did not become a WGC event until 2009.

== Team appearances ==
Amateur

- Eisenhower Trophy (representing South Africa): 2002

Professional

- Presidents Cup (representing the International team): 2011, 2013, 2015, 2017
- World Cup (representing South Africa): 2011

== See also ==
- List of golfers with most European Tour wins
