= Nick Watney =

American professional golfer (born 1981)

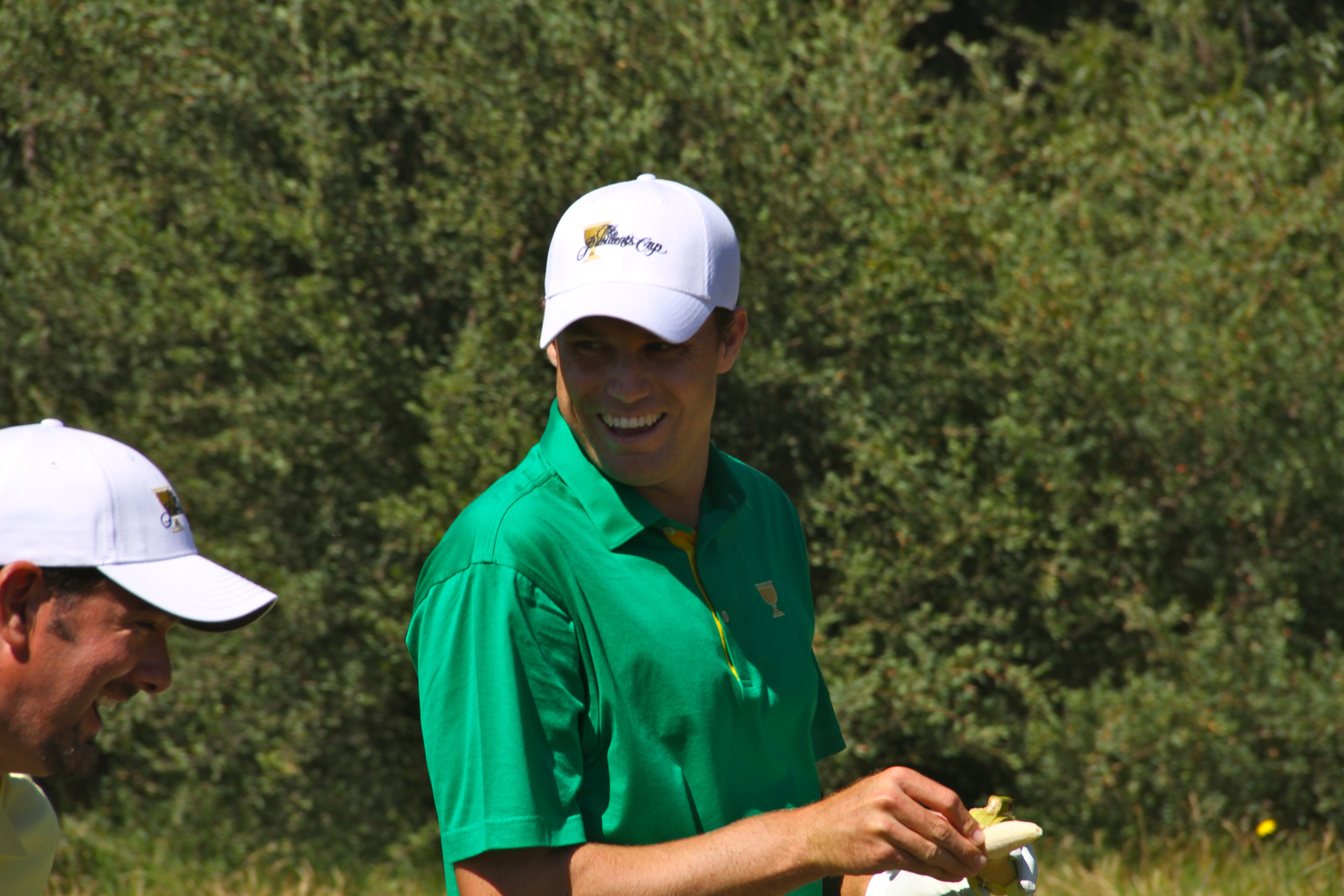
- Watney at the 2011 Presidents Cup

Personal information
- Full name: Nicholas Alan Watney
- Nationality: United States
- Born: April 25, 1981 (age 45) Sacramento, California, U.S.
- Height: 6 ft 2 in (1.88 m)
- Weight: 180 lb (82 kg; 13 st)

Career
- Sport: Golf
- College: Fresno State University
- Turned professional: 2003
- Current tour: PGA Tour
- Former tours: Canadian Tour; Nationwide Tour
- Professional wins: 9
- Highest ranking: 9 (July 31, 2011)

Number of wins by tour
- PGA Tour: 5
- European Tour: 1
- Asian Tour: 1
- Korn Ferry Tour: 1
- Other: 2

Best results in major championships
- Masters Tournament: 7th: 2010
- PGA Championship: T12: 2011
- U.S. Open: T21: 2012
- The Open Championship: T7: 2010

Nicholas Alan Watney (born April 25, 1981) is an American professional golfer who plays on the PGA Tour. The highlight of Watney's career is his victory at the 2011 WGC-Cadillac Championship. In July 2011, Watney won the AT&T National and broke into the top ten of the Official World Golf Ranking for the first time.

== Early career ==
Watney was born in Sacramento, California. He played his high school golf at Davis Senior High School in Davis, California. He played collegiate golf under his uncle Mike Watney at Fresno State University, where he was a three-time All-America golfer. Mike did not offer his nephew a scholarship to Fresno State; Nick had to walk on to the team. He turned professional in 2003, following in the footsteps of his uncle, who played on the PGA Tour in the 1970s.

== Professional career ==
In 2003, Watney's first professional victory came at the Lewis Chitengwa Memorial on the Canadian Tour. The next year he played on the Nationwide Tour, and after winning the season-ending Nationwide Tour Championship, Watney earned qualification for the PGA Tour.

In 2007, Watney won his first PGA Tour title at the Zurich Classic of New Orleans. This victory took Watney into the top 100 of the Official World Golf Ranking for the first time. He got his second tour win at the 2009 Buick Invitational at Torrey Pines Golf Course in San Diego, with a one-stroke victory over John Rollins, taking him to his highest position yet in the World Golf Rankings, number 76.

In the 2010 PGA Championship at Whistling Straits, Watney had a three-shot lead going into the final round. However, he shot a final round of 81, which dropped him back to a tie for 18th place.

Watney won the biggest tournament of his career to date and his first World Golf Championship at the WGC-Cadillac Championship at Doral Golf Resort & Spa in March 2011. He entered the final round trailing by two strokes, but shot a final round 67, including a run of four birdies in five holes in the middle of the round, and finished with a birdie at the notoriously difficult 18th, to record a two-stroke victory over compatriot Dustin Johnson. Watney admitted in an interview afterwards that he had dwelt on finishing 2nd at Doral, in the same tournament two years before, when his putt on the 18th finished a couple of inches short of the hole. After the victory, Watney moved up to number 15 in the World Golf Rankings.

In July, Watney won for the second time in 2011 at the AT&T National by beating K. J. Choi by two strokes. The victory owed much to his third-round score when he set a course record 62 around Aronimink Golf Club, beating the previous record set coincidentally on the same day, which Chris Kirk and Steve Marino held briefly with joint 63s. Watney shot a 27 on the back nine, which tied the second lowest nine-hole score ever recorded on the PGA Tour. The record is held by Corey Pavin who shot 26 at the U.S. Bank Championship in Milwaukee in 2006. During the final round Watney did not record a single bogey, making a number of crucial par saving putts to hold off the challenge of Choi and capture his fourth PGA Tour title. This win took Watney to the top of the FedEx Cup standings, ahead of Choi, and into the top ten of the Official World Golf Ranking for the first time in his career. He finished the 2011 season ranked third on the PGA Tour money list.

During the 2011 President's Cup, he defeated K. J. Choi on the final day to give the United States team a distinct advantage over the International Team coached by Greg Norman. The four-day match play tournament was played in Melbourne, Australia, and it was won by the American team 19–15.

During the first round of the 2012 U.S. Open at the Olympic Club, Watney made a double eagle on the par-five 17th hole to become only the third man to record a double eagle in U.S. Open history, the others being Chen Tze-chung in 1985 at Oakland Hills and Shaun Micheel in 2010 at Pebble Beach.

In August 2012, Watney won the first of the four FedEx Cup playoff events, The Barclays, at Bethpage Black in New York. He came from two behind in the final round to win by three strokes over Brandt Snedeker to take the outright lead in the FedEx Cup standings. After Rory McIlroy won the second playoff event, Watney dropped to second in the standings and wound up in fourth place at the conclusion of the FedEx Cup playoffs. For the season, Watney finished in 22nd on the PGA Tour's money list.

In October 2012, after the PGA Tour season ended, Watney won the Malaysian CIMB Classic, an event on the Asian Tour (co-sponsored by the PGA Tour), with a final round, course-record 61.

In 2013, Watney finished second at the BMW Championship, fourth at the Farmers Insurance Open, ninth at The Barclays and tenth at the Shriners Hospitals for Children Open and the Wells Fargo Championship. For the season, Watney finished 24th on the PGA Tour's money list.

In 2014, Watney finished fifth at the Wyndham Championship and eighth at the Barracuda Championship. With only two top-10s and five top-25s, Watney dropped to 106th on the PGA Tour's money list.

In 2015, Watney finished second at the AT&T Pebble Beach National Pro-Am, seventh at the Farmers Insurance Open and tenth at the AT&T Byron Nelson. With three top-10s and eight top-25s, Watney rose to 55th on the PGA Tour's money list. Watney only played in five events the following season due to a herniated disc in his lower back. He played the 2016–17 season on a Major Medical Extension.

In 2018, Watney tied for second at the Wells Fargo Championship. Watney finished 88th on the PGA Tour's money list and finished 74th on the final FedEx Cup standings. He made 21 of 26 cuts.

On June 19, 2020, while playing in the RBC Heritage in Hilton Head, Watney became the first PGA Tour player to test positive for COVID-19.

== Personal life ==
Watney's cousin is journalist Heidi Watney.

== Professional wins (9) ==
=== PGA Tour wins (5) ===
Legend
World Golf Championships (1)
FedEx Cup playoff events (1)
Other PGA Tour (3)

No.	Date	Tournament	Winning score	To par	Margin of victory	Runner-up
1	Apr 22, 2007	Zurich Classic of New Orleans	69-67-68-69=273	−15	3 strokes	(United States) Ken Duke
2	Feb 8, 2009	Buick Invitational	69-69-71-68=277	−11	1 stroke	(United States) John Rollins
3	Mar 13, 2011	WGC-Cadillac Championship	67-70-68-67=272	−16	2 strokes	(United States) Dustin Johnson
4	Jul 3, 2011	AT&T National	70-69-62-66=267	−13	2 strokes	(South Korea) K. J. Choi
5	Aug 26, 2012	The Barclays	65-69-71-69=274	−10	3 strokes	(United States) Brandt Snedeker

=== Asian Tour wins (1) ===
No.	Date	Tournament	Winning score	To par	Margin of victory	Runners-up
1	Oct 28, 2012	CIMB Classic^{1}	71-65-65-61=262	−22	1 stroke	(United States) Robert Garrigus, (United States) Bo Van Pelt

^{1}Co-sanctioned by the PGA Tour, but unofficial event on that tour.

=== Nationwide Tour wins (1) ===
Legend
Tour Championships (1)
Other Nationwide Tour (0)

No.	Date	Tournament	Winning score	To par	Margin of victory	Runner-up
1	Oct 31, 2004	Nationwide Tour Championship	69-64-71-69=273	−15	3 strokes	(United States) Brett Wetterich

=== Canadian Tour wins (1) ===
No.	Date	Tournament	Winning score	To par	Margin of victory	Runners-up
1	Aug 17, 2003	Lewis Chitengwa Memorial Championship	66-67-68-67=268	−20	5 strokes	(Canada) Derek Gillespie, (Scotland) Alan McLean, (Mexico) Alex Quiroz

=== Other wins (1) ===
No.	Date	Tournament	Winning score	To par	Margin of victory	Runner-up
1	Nov 20, 2005	Callaway Golf Pebble Beach Invitational	69-72-61-68=270	−18	1 stroke	(United States) Peter Tomasulo

== Results in major championships ==
Tournament	2007	2008	2009	2010	2011	2012	2013	2014	2015	2016	2017	2018
Masters Tournament		T11	19	7	46	T32	T13	T44				
U.S. Open	CUT	T60	CUT	76	CUT	T21	CUT	CUT				
The Open Championship	T35		T27	T7	CUT	T23	CUT	CUT				
PGA Championship	CUT		CUT	T18	T12	CUT	CUT	T33	T30			T71

Top 10
Did not play

CUT = missed the half-way cut
"T" = tied

=== Summary ===
Tournament	Wins	2nd	3rd	Top-5	Top-10	Top-25	Events	Cuts made
Masters Tournament	0	0	0	0	1	4	7	7
U.S. Open	0	0	0	0	0	1	8	3
The Open Championship	0	0	0	0	1	2	7	4
PGA Championship	0	0	0	0	0	2	9	5
Totals	0	0	0	0	2	9	31	19

- Most consecutive cuts made – 5 (2010 Masters – 2011 Masters)
- Longest streak of top-10s – 1 (twice)

== Results in The Players Championship ==
Tournament	2007	2008	2009
The Players Championship	CUT	T63	CUT

Tournament	2010	2011	2012	2013	2014	2015	2016	2017	2018	2019
The Players Championship	T17	T4	T56	CUT	CUT	CUT			T37	CUT

Tournament	2020	2021	2022	2023
The Players Championship	C		T66	CUT

Top 10
Did not play

CUT = missed the halfway cut
"T" indicates a tie for a place
C = Canceled after the first round due to the COVID-19 pandemic

== World Golf Championships ==
=== Wins (1) ===
Year	Championship	54 holes	Winning score	Margin	Runner-up
2011	WGC-Cadillac Championship	2 shot deficit	−16 (67-70-68-67=272)	2 strokes	(United States) Dustin Johnson

=== Results timeline ===
Tournament	2007	2008	2009	2010	2011	2012	2013	2014
Match Play				R16	R16	R16	R32	R64
Championship			2	T26	1	T17	T49	WD
Invitational	T61		T36	T16	T23	T19	T44	
Champions			5	T21	T33	T16	T31	

Win
Top 10
Did not play

QF, R16, R32, R64 = Round in which player lost in match play
"T" = tied
WD = withdrew
Note that the HSBC Champions did not become a WGC event until 2009.

== U.S. national team appearances ==
Amateur

- Palmer Cup: 2002 (winners)

Professional

- World Cup: 2009
- Presidents Cup: 2011 (winners)
- Wendy's 3-Tour Challenge (representing PGA Tour): 2012 (winners)

== See also ==
- 2004 Nationwide Tour graduates
- 2005 PGA Tour Qualifying School graduates
