= Mark Wilson (golfer) =

American professional golfer (born 1974)

Personal information
- Full name: Mark Joseph Wilson
- Nationality: United States
- Born: October 31, 1974 (age 52) Menomonee Falls, Wisconsin, U.S.
- Height: 5 ft 8 in (1.73 m)
- Weight: 145 lb (66 kg; 10.4 st)
- Spouse: Amy
- Children: 3

Career
- Sport: Golf
- College: University of North Carolina
- Turned professional: 1997
- Former tours: PGA Tour; PGA Tour of Australasia; Web.com Tour; NGA Hooters Tour
- Professional wins: 9
- Highest ranking: 24 (February 26, 2012)

Number of wins by tour
- PGA Tour: 5
- Other: 4

Best results in major championships
- Masters Tournament: CUT: 2011, 2012
- PGA Championship: T26: 2011
- U.S. Open: CUT: 1998, 2011, 2012, 2014
- The Open Championship: T63: 2011

Achievements and awards
- Ben Hogan Award: 1996

Mark Joseph Wilson (born October 31, 1974) is an American professional golfer who plays on the PGA Tour. In 1996, he received the Ben Hogan Award, given by Friends of Golf and the Golf Coaches Association of America, to the best college golf player in the United States. He is a five-time winner on the PGA Tour, with his most recent win coming at the 2012 Humana Challenge.

== Professional career ==
Wilson turned professional in 1997 and played on the NGA Hooters Tour for the early part of his career, where he won three times between 1998 and 2001. He then won his PGA Tour card for the 2003 season after finishing T17 at the Q School in 2002. In his first full season on tour, Wilson narrowly missed out on retaining his card when he finished 128th on the money list. He held conditional status for the 2004 PGA Tour season and alternated between the PGA Tour and Nationwide Tour for the season. He then regained his tour card for 2005 season at Q School and finished the year with three top-10 finishes including a T3 at the Valero Texas Open, which at the time was his best finish on the PGA Tour. He continued with conditional status in 2006 after finishing 133rd on the money list in 2005, then again regained full status at the 2006 Q School for the 2007 season.

Wilson won for the first time on the PGA Tour at the Honda Classic in March 2007, where he triumphed in a four-way playoff. He won the tournament on the third extra hole after being tied with José Cóceres, Camilo Villegas and Boo Weekley at 5-under-par. This victory lifted Wilson into the top 100 of the Official World Golf Ranking for the first time in his career.

Wilson has since won the 2009 Mayakoba Golf Classic at Riviera Maya-Cancun, the 2011 Sony Open in Hawaii and the 2011 Waste Management Phoenix Open where he triumphed in a playoff against Jason Dufner. The Sony Open victory earned Wilson his first trip to the Masters. Wilson earned his fifth PGA Tour victory at the 2012 Humana Challenge, holding off the challenge of Robert Garrigus, Johnson Wagner and John Mallinger by two strokes. He finished at 24-under-par, helped by a second round 62 which included eight birdies and an eagle. With the win, he moved to a career high of 40th in the Official World Golf Ranking. The following month, Wilson enjoyed a good run at the WGC-Accenture Match Play Championship where he made it all the way to the semi-finals before losing to eventual champion Hunter Mahan, 2&1. He did however win the consolation match to finish third, defeating world number three Lee Westwood, 1 up. In his run for the semi-finals, Wilson beat Bo Van Pelt (3 and 2), Robert Rock (3 and 2), Dustin Johnson (4 and 3) and Peter Hanson (4 and 3). This was Wilson' best showing at a WGC event and he moved to a career high 24th in the world ranking.

For the first time since joining the PGA Tour, Wilson played the 2016–17 season out of the past champion's category.

Wilson now works full time as a golf commentator for PGA Tour Radio, PGA Tour LIVE, found on ESPN+, and PGA Tour Champions coverage on Golf. He has played one PGA Tour event in 2022, getting in as a past champion of The American Express in La Quinta, California.

== Personal life ==
Wilson was born in Menomonee Falls, Wisconsin and currently resides in Greer, South Carolina.

Along with his wife, Amy, he is heavily involved in the Blessings in a Backpack charitable organization, with a mission of sending needy school children home every weekend with nonperishable food they can eat on Saturday and Sunday.

== Professional wins (9) ==
=== PGA Tour wins (5) ===
No.	Date	Tournament	Winning score	Margin of victory	Runner(s)-up
1	Mar 4, 2007	The Honda Classic	−5 (72-66-66-71=275)	Playoff	(Argentina) José Cóceres, (Colombia) Camilo Villegas, (United States) Boo Weekley
2	Mar 1, 2009	Mayakoba Golf Classic	−13 (66-64-69-68=267)	2 strokes	(United States) J. J. Henry
3	Jan 16, 2011	Sony Open in Hawaii	−16 (65-67-65-67=264)	2 strokes	(South Africa) Tim Clark, (United States) Steve Marino
4	Feb 7, 2011	Waste Management Phoenix Open	−18 (65-64-68-69=266)	Playoff	(United States) Jason Dufner
5	Jan 22, 2012	Humana Challenge	−24 (66-62-67-69=264)	2 strokes	(United States) Robert Garrigus, (United States) John Mallinger, (United States) Johnson Wagner

PGA Tour playoff record (2–0)

No.	Year	Tournament	Opponent(s)	Result
1	2007	The Honda Classic	(Argentina) José Cóceres, (Colombia) Camilo Villegas, (United States) Boo Weekley	Won with birdie on third extra hole Villegas and Weekley eliminated by par on second hole
2	2011	Waste Management Phoenix Open	(United States) Jason Dufner	Won with birdie on second extra hole

=== NGA Hooters Tour wins (3) ===
No.	Date	Tournament	Winning score	Margin of victory	Runner(s)-up
1	Mar 22, 1998	Dick Brooks Classic	−13 (68-70-68-69=275)	4 strokes	(United States) Wes Short Jr.
2	Apr 18, 1999	Gold Stroke Casino Classic	−16 (67-64-73-68=272)	7 strokes	(United States) Greg Parker
3	May 14, 2000	Hooters Classic	−11 (67-74-67-69=277)	2 strokes	(Republic of Ireland) Richie Coughlan, (United States) Scott Kammann, (United States) Steve Pope

=== Other wins (1) ===
- 2001 Wisconsin State Open

== Results in major championships ==
Tournament	1998	1999	2000	2001	2002	2003	2004	2005	2006	2007	2008	2009	2010	2011	2012	2013	2014
Masters Tournament														CUT	CUT		
U.S. Open	CUT													CUT	CUT		CUT
The Open Championship														T63	CUT		
PGA Championship										CUT		CUT		T26	CUT		

Did not play

CUT = missed the half-way cut
"T" = tied

== Results in The Players Championship ==
Tournament	2007	2008	2009	2010	2011	2012	2013	2014	2015	2016
The Players Championship	CUT	T42	T55	CUT	CUT	CUT	CUT	CUT		CUT

Did not play

CUT = missed the halfway cut
"T" indicates a tie for a place

== Results in World Golf Championships ==
Tournament	2007	2008	2009	2010	2011	2012
Match Play					R32	3
Championship	25				T49	T45
Invitational	T36				T17	T45
Champions					T56	T46

Top 10
Did not play

QF, R16, R32, R64 = Round in which player lost in match play
"T" = Tied
Note that the HSBC Champions did not become a WGC event until 2009.

== See also ==
- 2002 PGA Tour Qualifying School graduates
- 2004 PGA Tour Qualifying School graduates
- 2006 PGA Tour Qualifying School graduates
