= Bill Haas =

American professional golfer (born 1982)

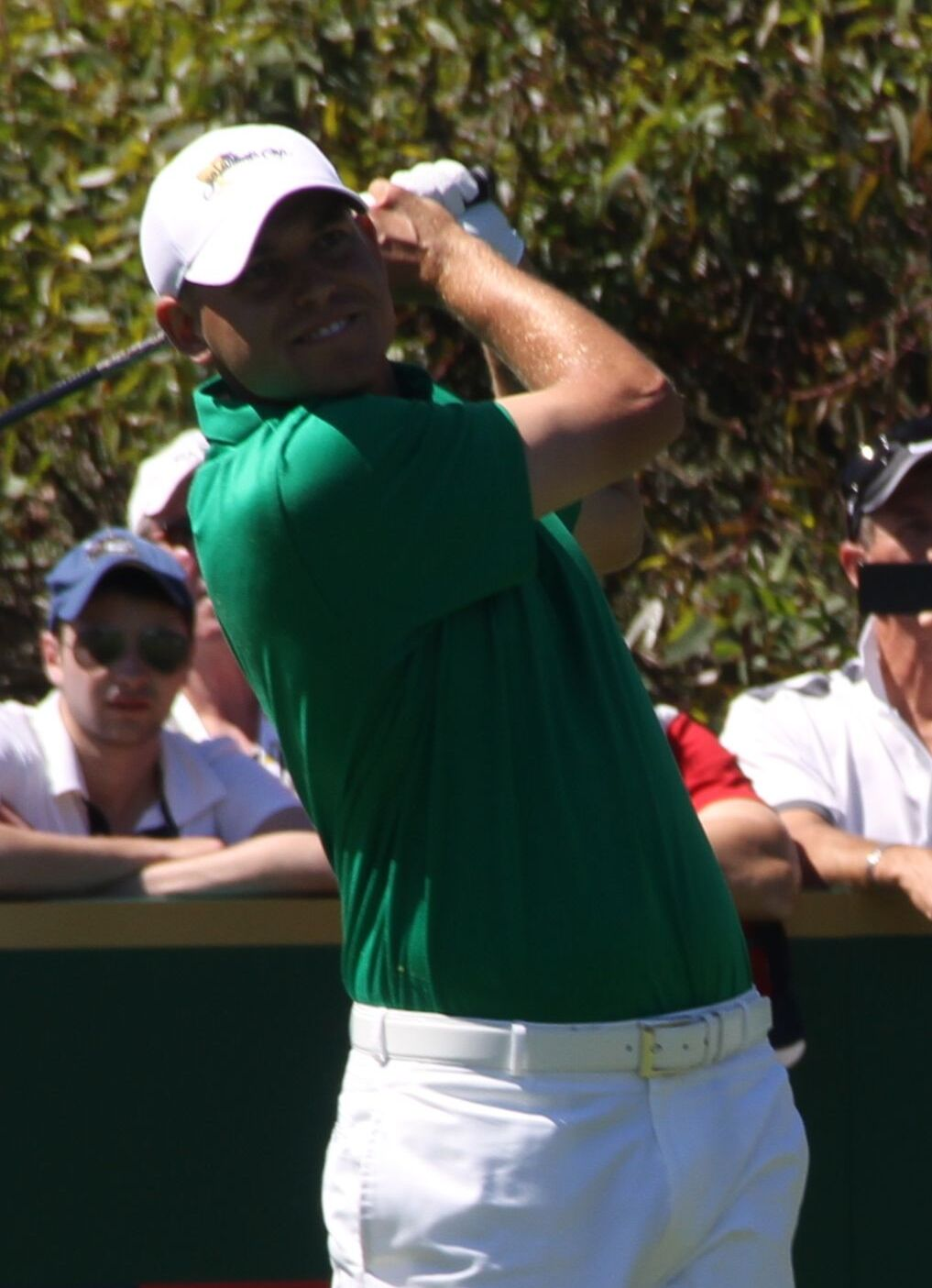
- Haas at the 2011 Presidents Cup

Personal information
- Full name: William Harlan Haas
- Nationality: United States
- Born: May 24, 1982 (age 44) Charlotte, North Carolina, U.S.
- Height: 6 ft 2 in (1.88 m)
- Weight: 185 lb (84 kg; 13.2 st)
- Spouse: Julie (née Arrington)
- Children: 3

Career
- Sport: Golf
- College: Wake Forest University
- Turned professional: 2004
- Current tour: PGA Tour
- Former tour: Nationwide Tour
- Professional wins: 7
- Highest ranking: 12 (February 19, 2012)

Number of wins by tour
- PGA Tour: 6
- Other: 1

Best results in major championships
- Masters Tournament: T12: 2015
- PGA Championship: T12: 2011
- U.S. Open: T5: 2017
- The Open Championship: T9: 2016

Achievements and awards
- Haskins Award: 2004
- Ben Hogan Award: 2004
- PGA Tour FedEx Cup winner: 2011

William Harlan Haas (born May 24, 1982) is an American professional golfer who plays on the PGA Tour and won the 2011 FedEx Cup. He is the son of former PGA Tour player Jay Haas.

== Early life ==
In 1982, Haas was born in Charlotte, North Carolina and was raised in Greer, South Carolina, a suburb of Greenville. He was the third member of his family to play golf at Wake Forest University in Winston-Salem, North Carolina, following his father, Jay and uncle, Jerry.

== Amateur career ==
Haas had a distinguished college career: he was a three-time first-team All-American, four-time All-ACC, two-time ACC player-of-the-year and the 2001 ACC rookie-of-the-year. During his college career, he won ten college tournaments. In his 2004 senior year, Haas won the Haskins Award, Jack Nicklaus Award and the Ben Hogan Award. He also set an NCAA record for lowest scoring average. Haas was a member of the 2003 Walker Cup team as well as two Palmer Cup teams.

== Professional career ==
In 2004, Haas turned professional. In 2005, Haas was a member of the Nationwide Tour after failing to earn his PGA Tour card in qualifying school. His best finish in a Nationwide Tour event was a solo second at the 2005 Scholarship America Showdown. At the end of the season Haas birdied the last two holes at the 2005 qualifying tournament to earn his card on the PGA Tour for the 2006 season.

In his debut year on tour, Haas finished 99th on the money list, making 19 out of 30 cuts. His best result was at the Wachovia Championship where he finished in a tie for fourth. He kept his tour card for the 2007 season, but he missed eight cuts in his first 13 events. He started to turn his form around during the fall series and recorded his best finish of the year at the Viking Classic with a tie for third place. He ended the year 104th on the money list.

In 2008 Haas had a remarkably similar year to 2007, finishing 104th on the money list for the second year in a row. He qualified for the first two FedEx Cup playoffs events before being eliminated at the halfway stage, finishing 73rd in the standings. Haas also played well at the Viking Classic for the second year running with a T-4 finish. Haas enjoyed much greater success in 2009 with four top-10 finishes including a tie for third at the Valero Texas Open. This set him up for a good run into the playoffs and for first time in his career, Haas qualified for the third playoff event, the BMW Championship before falling short of the top 30 mark and ending the season 41st in the standings. He also finished 61st on the year-end money list, winning just under $1.5 million.

At the start of the 2010 season Haas won his first PGA Tour title at the Bob Hope Classic in La Quinta, California. A week prior to the event, Haas received advice from his father, Jay, and great-uncle Bob Goalby about his foot positioning during his swing. Haas won the event by one shot over Matt Kuchar, Tim Clark and Bubba Watson. The win came at the start of his fifth year on the PGA Tour.

With his first win Haas earned his first appearance in the Masters Tournament, where he finished in a tie for 26th. In the fall he won his second PGA Tour title of 2010 and of his career, in October at the Viking Classic, winning by three strokes over Michael Allen. The following week he finished runner-up at the McGladrey Classic to Heath Slocum by one stroke. This late-season surge elevated him to 20th place on the season's final money list. In addition, he finished 31st in the FedEx cup standings after narrowly missing out on a place in the Tour Championship by one position.

In 2011 Haas won the season-ending Tour Championship at East Lake Golf Club, defeating Hunter Mahan in a sudden death playoff at the third extra hole. At the second playoff hole, Haas played an exceptional pitch from the bank of the water hazard to save par and extend the playoff. The victory propelled Haas to 2011 FedEx Cup title and the $10 million prize. Haas was ranked seventh on the final 2011 PGA Tour money list (the FedEx Cup money does not count toward that total).

Haas was one of U.S. team captain, Fred Couples', two picks for the 2011 Presidents Cup team, along with Tiger Woods. The USA went on to retain the cup, and Haas contributed 1.5 points to the team, with an overall record of 1-3-1 for the week.

Haas won for the fourth time on the PGA Tour in February 2012 at the Northern Trust Open at Riviera Country Club. He came from two strokes back on the final day to hold the clubhouse lead and force both Phil Mickelson and Keegan Bradley to hole lengthy birdie putts on the last hole to ensure a playoff. All three players then parred the 18th, the first playoff hole, and continued to the driveable par-4 10th hole. Haas squirted his drive out to the left to leave a tricky pitch, while Mickelson found the rough and Bradley the bunker on the right. Haas decided to pitch out to the middle of the green, as both Mickelson and Bradley could not find the green on their second shots. Haas then holed a 43-foot birdie putt, and when neither Mickelson nor Bradley could match him, his victory was ensured.

In June 2013 Haas claimed his fifth PGA Tour title with a win at the AT&T National at Congressional Country Club. He won by three strokes over Roberto Castro after shooting a closing 66, including six birdies and one bogey. He had begun the final round in a four-way tie for the lead. Haas is now one of four players who have won PGA Tour events in each of the last four seasons, joining Dustin Johnson, Phil Mickelson and Justin Rose.

In April 2014 Haas led the Masters after an opening round of 68. However, he shot a second round six-over-par 78 to fall down the leaderboard. Over the weekend he finished with rounds of 74-70 to end T20th.

In January 2015, Haas won for the sixth time on the PGA Tour, at the Humana Challenge. He shot a final round 67 for a total of 22-under-par and one stroke victory over five other players. This was the second time that Haas had won the Humana Challenge in his career, having previously won in 2010 (as the Bob Hope Classic). Haas said afterwards that the victory came as a surprise to himself after only recently returning from a fractured wrist injury that hampered him throughout 2014. Haas was selected to his third Presidents Cup in 2015, becoming the first American to play in three Presidents Cups without being chosen for the Ryder Cup.

Haas played the 2018-19 season out of the 126-150 category after an injury kept him off the course for part of the previous season and he did not earn enough to retain full Tour privileges, the first time in his career that Haas did not have full status on the PGA Tour.

== Personal life ==
Haas comes from a distinguished family of golfers. His father is nine-time PGA Tour winner, Jay Haas. His brother, Jay Haas Jr. and uncle, Jerry Haas, are former PGA Tour players. He is a great nephew of 1968 Masters Tournament winner Bob Goalby.

Haas and his father won the CVS Caremark Charity Classic in 2004, an unofficial PGA Tour event.

On February 13, 2018, Haas was involved in an automobile crash in Pacific Palisades, California in which the driver, Mark Gibello, was pronounced dead. The following day, Haas was released from the hospital after treatment for an injury from the incident and released a statement saying that he would withdraw from the ongoing Genesis Open.

== Awards and honors ==
- In 2001, Haas earned Atlantic Coast Conference rookie-of-the-year honors. Haas was also earned All-ACC honors every year while at Wake Forest.
- Haas was a two-time ACC player-of-the-year while at Wake Forest.
- Haas was a three-time first-team All-American during his collegiate experience.
- In 2004, during his senior year, Haas won the three most prestigious college golfer awards: the Haskins Award, Jack Nicklaus Award, and Ben Hogan Award.
- In 2011, Haas won the FedEx Cup, the PGA Tour's year-ending championship trophy.

== Amateur wins ==
- 2002 Players Amateur

== Professional wins (7) ==
=== PGA Tour wins (6) ===
Legend
FedEx Cup playoff events (1)
Other PGA Tour (5)

No.	Date	Tournament	Winning score	To par	Margin of victory	Runner(s)-up
1	Jan 25, 2010	Bob Hope Classic	68-66-66-66-64=330	−30	1 stroke	(South Africa) Tim Clark, (United States) Matt Kuchar, (United States) Bubba Watson
2	Oct 3, 2010	Viking Classic	66-66-69-72=273	−15	3 strokes	(United States) Michael Allen
3	Sep 25, 2011	Tour Championship	68-67-69-68=272	−8	Playoff	(United States) Hunter Mahan
4	Feb 19, 2012	Northern Trust Open	72-68-68-69=277	−7	Playoff	(United States) Keegan Bradley, (United States) Phil Mickelson
5	Jun 30, 2013	AT&T National	70-68-68-66=272	−12	3 strokes	(United States) Roberto Castro
6	Jan 26, 2015	Humana Challenge (2)	67-63-69-67=266	−22	1 stroke	(United States) Charley Hoffman, (United States) Matt Kuchar, (South Korea) Park Sung-joon, (United States) Brendan Steele, (United States) Steve Wheatcroft

PGA Tour playoff record (2–3)

No.	Year	Tournament	Opponent(s)	Result
1	2011	Bob Hope Classic	(United States) Gary Woodland, (Venezuela) Jhonattan Vegas	Vegas won with par on second extra hole Haas eliminated by birdie on first hole
2	2011	Greenbrier Classic	(United States) Bob Estes, (United States) Scott Stallings	Stallings won with birdie on first extra hole
3	2011	Tour Championship	(United States) Hunter Mahan	Won with par on third extra hole
4	2012	Northern Trust Open	(United States) Keegan Bradley, (United States) Phil Mickelson	Won with birdie on second extra hole
5	2016	Valspar Championship	(South Africa) Charl Schwartzel	Lost to par on first extra hole

=== Other wins (1) ===
No.	Date	Tournament	Winning score	To par	Margin of victory	Runners-up
1	Jun 29, 2004	CVS Charity Classic (with (United States) Jay Haas)	60-62=122	−20	1 stroke	(United States) Chad Campbell and (United States) David Toms

Other playoff record (0–1)

No.	Year	Tournament	Opponents	Result
1	2016	CVS Health Charity Classic (with (United States) Billy Andrade)	(United States) Keegan Bradley and (United States) Jon Curran	Lost to birdie on first extra hole

== Results in major championships ==
Tournament	2003	2004	2005	2006	2007	2008	2009
Masters Tournament							
U.S. Open	CUT	T40					
The Open Championship							
PGA Championship							

Tournament	2010	2011	2012	2013	2014	2015	2016	2017	2018
Masters Tournament	T26	T42	T37	T20	T20	T12	T24	T36	
U.S. Open		T23	CUT	CUT	T35	CUT	T51	T5	T36
The Open Championship	CUT	T57	T19	CUT	T51	CUT	T9	CUT	
PGA Championship	CUT	T12	T32	T25	T27	T65	T56	T54	CUT

Top 10
Did not play

CUT = missed the half-way cut
"T" = tied

=== Summary ===
Tournament	Wins	2nd	3rd	Top-5	Top-10	Top-25	Events	Cuts made
Masters Tournament	0	0	0	0	0	4	8	8
U.S. Open	0	0	0	1	1	2	10	6
The Open Championship	0	0	0	0	1	2	8	4
PGA Championship	0	0	0	0	0	2	9	7
Totals	0	0	0	1	2	10	35	25

- Most consecutive cuts made – 7 (2015 PGA – 2017 U.S. Open)
- Longest streak of top-10s – 1 (twice)

== Results in The Players Championship ==
Tournament	2007	2008	2009	2010	2011	2012	2013	2014	2015	2016	2017	2018
The Players Championship	T72	CUT	CUT	T39	CUT	T25	CUT	T26	T4	T43	CUT	CUT

Top 10

CUT = missed the halfway cut
"T" indicates a tie for a place

== Results in World Golf Championships ==
Results not in chronological order before 2015.

Tournament	2010	2011	2012	2013	2014	2015	2016	2017
Championship	T6	T31	T29	T43	T6	T7	T49	T32
Match Play		R64	R64	R64	R32	T17	R16	3
Invitational	T33	T63	T19	T7	T41	T25	T38	T36
Champions	T21	T42	10	T21	T48		T4	T62

Top 10
Did not play

QF, R16, R32, R64 = Round in which player lost in match play
"T" = Tied

== U.S. national team appearances ==
Amateur

- Palmer Cup: 2002 (winners), 2003
- Walker Cup: 2003

Professional

- Presidents Cup: 2011 (winners), 2013 (winners), 2015 (winners)

== See also ==
- 2005 PGA Tour Qualifying School graduates
