= 2010 Masters Tournament =

American golf tournament held in 2010

- Front cover of the 2010 Masters Journal

Tournament information
- Dates: April 8–11, 2010
- Location: Augusta, Georgia; 33.503°N 82.020°W
- Course: Augusta National Golf Club
- Organized by: Augusta National Golf Club
- Tours: PGA Tour; European Tour; Japan Golf Tour

Statistics
- Par: 72
- Length: 7,435 yards (6,799 m)
- Field: 96 players (48 after cut)
- Cut: 147 (+3)
- Prize fund: US$7,500,000
- Winner's share: $1,350,000

Champion
- (United States) Phil Mickelson
- 272 (−16)
- Location in the United States Location in Georgia

The 2010 Masters Tournament was the 74th Masters Tournament, played April 8–11 at Augusta National Golf Club. Phil Mickelson won his third Masters and fourth major title, three shots ahead of runner-up Lee Westwood.

== Field ==
The Masters has the smallest field of the major championships. Officially the Masters remains an invitation event, but there is now a qualification process. In theory, the club could simply decline to invite a qualified player. This is the list of the 96 players who played in the 2010 Masters Tournament. Each player is classified according to the first category by which he qualified, but other categories are shown in parentheses.

1. Past Masters Champions
Ángel Cabrera (2,11,15,17,18,19), Fred Couples, Ben Crenshaw, Trevor Immelman, Zach Johnson (15,16,17,18,19), Bernhard Langer, Sandy Lyle, Phil Mickelson (4,5,11,12,15,16,17,18,19), Larry Mize, Mark O'Meara, Vijay Singh (18,19), Craig Stadler, Tom Watson (13), Mike Weir (15,17,18,19), Tiger Woods (2,3,4,11,12,14,15,16,17,18,19), Ian Woosnam

(Past champions who did not play: Tommy Aaron, Seve Ballesteros, Jack Burke Jr., Billy Casper, Charles Coody, Nick Faldo, Raymond Floyd, Doug Ford, Bob Goalby, Jack Nicklaus, José María Olazábal, Arnold Palmer, Gary Player, and Fuzzy Zoeller). Nicklaus joined Palmer as "honorary starters" and teed off on the first day at the first hole to kick off the tournament.

2. Last five U.S. Open Champions
Michael Campbell, Lucas Glover (12,15,17,18,19), Geoff Ogilvy (11,15,16,17,18,19)

3. Last five British Open Champions
Stewart Cink (13,15,17,18,19), Pádraig Harrington (4,15,17,18,19)

4. Last five PGA Champions
Y. E. Yang (14,15,16,17,18,19)

5. Last three of The Players Champions
Sergio García (18,19), Henrik Stenson (18,19)

6. Top two finishers in the 2009 U.S. Amateur
An Byeong-hun (a), Ben Martin (a)

7. Winner of the 2009 Amateur Championship
Matteo Manassero (a)

8. Winner of the 2009 Asian Amateur
Han Chang-won (a)

9. Winner of the 2009 U.S. Amateur Public Links
Brad Benjamin (a)

10. Winner of the 2009 U.S. Mid-Amateur
Nathan Smith (a)

11. The top 16 finishers and ties in the 2009 Masters Tournament
Chad Campbell, Tim Clark (15,18,19), Steve Flesch, Jim Furyk (15,16,17,18,19), Todd Hamilton, Shingo Katayama, Hunter Mahan (12,15,16,17,18,19), John Merrick, Sean O'Hair (15,16,17,18,19), Kenny Perry (15,16,17,18,19), Steve Stricker (15,16,17,18,19), Camilo Villegas (16,18,19)

12. Top 8 finishers and ties in the 2009 U.S. Open
Ricky Barnes, David Duval, Ross Fisher (18,19), Søren Hansen (18,19)

13. Top 4 finishers and ties in the 2009 British Open Championship
Lee Westwood (14,18,19), Chris Wood

14. Top 4 finishers and ties in the 2009 PGA Championship
Rory McIlroy (18,19)

15. Top 30 leaders on the 2009 PGA Tour official money earnings list
Paul Casey (18,19), Brian Gay (16,17,18), Retief Goosen (17,18,19), Dustin Johnson (16,17,19), Jerry Kelly (16,17), Matt Kuchar (19), Justin Leonard (18), Kevin Na (17,19), Ian Poulter (16,18,19), John Rollins, Rory Sabbatini (16), John Senden (17), David Toms (17,18), Nick Watney (17,18,19)

16. Winners of PGA Tour events that award a full-point allocation for the season-ending Tour Championship, between the 2009 Masters Tournament and the 2010 Masters Tournament
Ben Crane, Ernie Els (17,18,19), Nathan Green, Bill Haas, Anthony Kim (18,19), Ryan Moore, Ryan Palmer, Heath Slocum (17)

17. All players qualifying for the 2009 edition of The Tour Championship
Luke Donald (18,19), Jason Dufner, Marc Leishman, Steve Marino, Scott Verplank

18. Top 50 on the final 2009 Official World Golf Rankings list
Robert Allenby (19), Ben Curtis, Simon Dyson, Anders Hansen, Yuta Ikeda (19), Ryo Ishikawa (19), Miguel Ángel Jiménez (19), Robert Karlsson (19), Martin Kaymer (19), Søren Kjeldsen, Graeme McDowell (19), Edoardo Molinari (19), Francesco Molinari (19), Adam Scott, Oliver Wilson (19)
(Michael Sim (19) withdrew prior to the tournament with a shoulder injury)

19. Top 50 on the Official World Golf Rankings list going into the tournament
K. J. Choi, Louis Oosthuizen, Álvaro Quirós, Charl Schwartzel, Thongchai Jaidee

20. International invitees
None

== Par 3 Contest ==
Louis Oosthuizen won the contest with a 6 under par 21. There were 2 holes in one during the contest, both on the 9th hole, achieved by Graeme McDowell and Jim Furyk. McDowell went on to win the U.S. Open, Oosthuizen went on to win The Open Championship, and Furyk went on to win the 2010 FedEx Cup.

== Round summaries ==
=== First round ===
Thursday, April 8, 2010

The day started very sunny, but clouds began accumulating later in the morning and thunderstorms were expected in the afternoon; however, the weather remained fair. The much anticipated return of Tiger Woods came on Thursday, who shot a 4-under 68. This was a good opening for Woods, who had never before shot a first round in the 60s at the Masters. But the story of the day was the two Champions Tour players, 60-year-old Tom Watson and 50-year-old Fred Couples, who shot 67 and 66 respectively. Major champions Phil Mickelson and Y.E. Yang were one stroke back of leader Couples along with Lee Westwood, K. J. Choi, and Watson.

Place	Player	Score	To par
1	(United States) Fred Couples	66	−6
T2	(South Korea) K. J. Choi	67	−5
T2	(United States) Phil Mickelson	67	−5
T2	(United States) Tom Watson	67	−5
T2	(England) Lee Westwood	67	−5
T2	(South Korea) Y. E. Yang	67	−5
T7	(United States) Ricky Barnes	68	−4
T7	(United States) Anthony Kim	68	−4
T7	(England) Ian Poulter	68	−4
T7	(United States) Nick Watney	68	−4
T7	(United States) Tiger Woods	68	−4

=== Second round ===
Friday, April 9, 2010

Phil Mickelson shot a 1-under 71 despite missing a 1-foot putt on Hole 5. Fred Couples and Tom Watson both fell back after solid opening rounds. Englishmen Lee Westwood and Ian Poulter shared the lead heading into the weekend.

Place	Player	Score	To par
T1	(England) Ian Poulter	68-68=136	−8
T1	(England) Lee Westwood	67-69=136	−8
T3	(United States) Ricky Barnes	68-70=138	−6
T3	(South Korea) K. J. Choi	67-71=138	−6
T3	(United States) Anthony Kim	68-70=138	−6
T3	(United States) Phil Mickelson	67-71=138	−6
T3	(United States) Tiger Woods	68-70=138	−6
8	(South Korea) Y. E. Yang	67-72=139	−5
T9	(United States) Fred Couples	66-75=141	−3
T9	(Denmark) Søren Kjeldsen	70-71=141	−3
T9	(United States) Tom Watson	67-74=141	−3

Amateurs: Manassero (+3), Smith (+5), Benjamin (+6), An (+11), Han (+11), Martin (+11).

=== Third round ===
Saturday, April 10, 2010

Lee Westwood continued his solid play in the third round to stay in the lead. Phil Mickelson shot a 67, including a dramatic eagle-eagle-birdie on 13, 14 and 15, to move into second place, three strokes clear of the rest of the field.

Place	Player	Score	To par
1	(England) Lee Westwood	67-69-68=204	−12
2	(United States) Phil Mickelson	67-71-67=205	−11
T3	(South Korea) K. J. Choi	67-71-70=208	−8
T3	(United States) Tiger Woods	68-70-70=208	−8
5	(United States) Fred Couples	66-75-68=209	−7
T6	(United States) Ricky Barnes	68-70-72=210	−6
T6	(United States) Hunter Mahan	71-71-68=210	−6
T6	(England) Ian Poulter	68-68-74=210	−6
T9	(United States) Anthony Kim	68-70-73=211	−5
T9	(South Korea) Y. E. Yang	67-72-72=211	−5

=== Final round ===
Sunday, April 11, 2010

==== Summary ====
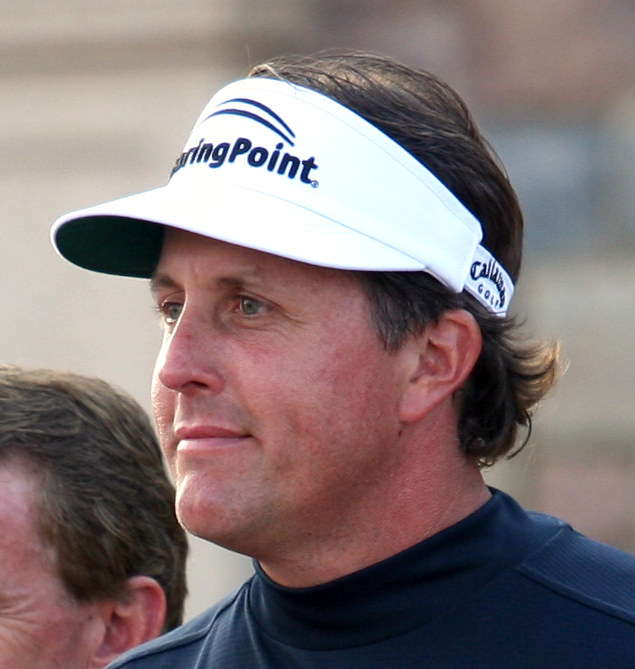
Phil Mickelson won his third Masters title

External videos
- Full final round coverage on CBS on YouTube

Fred Couples mounted an early charge up the leaderboard with two birdies in his first three holes, but he quickly cooled off and ended up in sixth place. Overnight leader Lee Westwood started erratically, while Phil Mickelson parred his first seven holes. K. J. Choi was briefly tied for the lead at -12 with a birdie at 10 but he eventually fell back to a tie for fourth with playing partner Tiger Woods (they were paired together for all four rounds of the tournament). Twenty-four-year-old Anthony Kim shot a blistering 65, including a -5 run over four holes; he finished third. But down the stretch, Mickelson pulled away from Westwood with a bogey-free round of 67 to win the tournament.

==== Final leaderboard ====
Champion
Silver Cup winner (low amateur)
(a) = amateur
(c) = past champion

Top 10
Place	Player	Score	To par	Money (US$)
1	(United States) Phil Mickelson (c)	67-71-67-67=272	−16	1,350,000
2	(England) Lee Westwood	67-69-68-71=275	−13	810,000
3	(United States) Anthony Kim	68-70-73-65=276	−12	510,000
T4	(South Korea) K. J. Choi	67-71-70-69=277	−11	330,000
T4	(United States) Tiger Woods (c)	68-70-70-69=277	−11	330,000
6	(United States) Fred Couples (c)	66-75-68-70=279	−9	270,000
7	(United States) Nick Watney	68-76-71-65=280	−8	251,250
T8	(United States) Hunter Mahan	71-71-68-71=281	−7	225,000
T8	(South Korea) Yang Yong-eun	67-72-72-70=281	−7	225,000
T10	(United States) Ricky Barnes	68-70-72-73=283	−5	195,000
T10	(England) Ian Poulter	68-68-74-73=283	−5	195,000

Leaderboard below the top 10
Place	Player	Score	To par	Money ($)
T12	(Spain) Miguel Ángel Jiménez	72-75-72-66=285	−3	165,000
T12	(United States) Jerry Kelly	72-74-67-72=285	−3	165,000
T14	(South Africa) Trevor Immelman (c)	69-73-72-72=286	−2	131,250
T14	(United States) Steve Marino	71-73-69-73=286	−2	131,250
T14	(United States) Ryan Moore	72-73-73-68=286	−2	131,250
T14	(United States) David Toms	69-75-71-71=286	−2	131,250
T18	(Argentina) Ángel Cabrera (c)	73-74-69-71=287	−1	94,500
T18	(South Africa) Ernie Els	71-73-75-68=287	−1	94,500
T18	(Australia) Adam Scott	69-75-72-71=287	−1	94,500
T18	(United States) Heath Slocum	72-73-70-72=287	−1	94,500
T18	(United States) Scott Verplank	73-73-73-68=287	−1	94,500
T18	(United States) Tom Watson (c)	67-74-73-73=287	−1	94,500
T24	(United States) Ben Crane	71-75-74-68=288	E	69,000
T24	(United States) Matt Kuchar	70-73-74-71=288	E	69,000
T26	(United States) Bill Haas	72-70-71-76=289	+1	57,750
T26	(Australia) Geoff Ogilvy	74-72-69-74=289	+1	57,750
T26	(United States) Kenny Perry	72-71-72-74=289	+1	57,750
29	(Japan) Yuta Ikeda	70-77-72-71=290	+2	53,250
T30	(United States) Jason Dufner	75-72-75-69=291	+3	45,563
T30	(Denmark) Søren Kjeldsen	70-71-75-75=291	+3	45,563
T30	(Italy) Francesco Molinari	70-74-75-72=291	+3	45,563
T30	(United States) Sean O'Hair	72-71-72-76=291	+3	45,563
T30	(South Africa) Charl Schwartzel	69-76-72-74=291	+3	45,563
T30	(United States) Steve Stricker	73-73-74-71=291	+3	45,563
T36	(United States) Lucas Glover	76-71-71-74=292	+4	38,625
T36	(Italy) Matteo Manassero (a)	71-76-73-72=292	+4	0
T38	(United States) Steve Flesch	75-71-70-78=294	+6	34,500
T38	(South Africa) Retief Goosen	74-71-76-73=294	+6	34,500
T38	(United States) Dustin Johnson	71-72-76-75=294	+6	34,500
T38	(Colombia) Camilo Villegas	74-72-71-77=294	+6	34,500
42	(United States) Zach Johnson (c)	70-74-76-75=295	+7	30,750
T43	(Sweden) Robert Karlsson	71-72-77-76=296	+8	28,500
T43	(Canada) Mike Weir (c)	71-72-76-77=296	+8	28,500
T45	(Australia) Robert Allenby	72-75-78-73=298	+10	24,750
T45	(United States) Chad Campbell	79-68-80-71=298	+10	24,750
T45	(Spain) Sergio García	74-70-76-78=298	+10	24,750
48	(Australia) Nathan Green	72-75-80-75=302	+14	21,750
CUT	(South Africa) Tim Clark	75-73=148	+4	
CUT	(United States) Ben Curtis	73-75=148	+4	
CUT	(Japan) Ryo Ishikawa	72-76=148	+4	
CUT	(United States) Larry Mize (c)	76-72=148	+4	
CUT	(Australia) John Senden	71-77=148	+4	
CUT	(England) Luke Donald	74-75=149	+5	
CUT	(Denmark) Søren Hansen	74-75=149	+5	
CUT	(Republic of Ireland) Pádraig Harrington	74-75=149	+5	
CUT	(Germany) Martin Kaymer	76-73=149	+5	
CUT	(Germany) Bernhard Langer (c)	71-78=149	+5	
CUT	(Northern Ireland) Graeme McDowell	75-74=149	+5	
CUT	(United States) John Merrick	72-77=149	+5	
CUT	(United States) Mark O'Meara (c)	75-74=149	+5	
CUT	(United States) Ryan Palmer	72-77=149	+5	
CUT	(United States) Nathan Smith (a)	74-75=149	+5	
CUT	(United States) Brad Benjamin (a)	73-77=150	+6	
CUT	(England) Simon Dyson	77-73=150	+6	
CUT	(United States) Justin Leonard	75-75=150	+6	
CUT	(United States) Kevin Na	74-76=150	+6	
CUT	(Spain) Álvaro Quirós	75-75=150	+6	
CUT	(United States) David Duval	76-75=151	+7	
CUT	(United States) Brian Gay	74-77=151	+7	
CUT	(United States) Todd Hamilton	74-77=151	+7	
CUT	(Australia) Marc Leishman	72-79=151	+7	
CUT	(Northern Ireland) Rory McIlroy	74-77=151	+7	
CUT	(Italy) Edoardo Molinari	76-75=151	+7	
CUT	(United States) John Rollins	75-76=151	+7	
CUT	(England) Oliver Wilson	78-73=151	+7	
CUT	(United States) Stewart Cink	76-76=152	+8	
CUT	(Japan) Shingo Katayama	75-77=152	+8	
CUT	(South Africa) Louis Oosthuizen	75-77=152	+8	
CUT	(England) Paul Casey	75-78=153	+9	
CUT	(England) Ross Fisher	77-76=153	+9	
CUT	(South Africa) Rory Sabbatini	75-78=153	+9	
CUT	(Fiji) Vijay Singh (c)	76-78=154	+10	
CUT	(England) Chris Wood	78-76=154	+10	
CUT	(South Korea) An Byeong-hun (a)	78-77=155	+11	
CUT	(United States) Ben Crenshaw (c)	77-78=155	+11	
CUT	(South Korea) Han Chang-won (a)	79-76=155	+11	
CUT	(Scotland) Sandy Lyle (c)	69-86=155	+11	
CUT	(United States) Ben Martin (a)	75-80=155	+11	
CUT	(Sweden) Henrik Stenson	80-75=155	+11	
CUT	(United States) Jim Furyk	80-76=156	+12	
CUT	(Denmark) Anders Hansen	80-77=157	+13	
CUT	(United States) Craig Stadler (c)	79-78=157	+13	
CUT	(New Zealand) Michael Campbell	83-81=164	+20	
CUT	(Wales) Ian Woosnam (c)	81-83=164	+20	
WD	(Thailand) Thongchai Jaidee	74	+2	

- Final bulletin - 2010 prize money

==== Scorecard ====
Hole	1	2	3	4	5	6	7	8	9	10	11	12	13	14	15	16	17	18
Par	4	5	4	3	4	3	4	5	4	4	4	3	5	4	5	3	4	4
(United States) Mickelson	−11	−11	−11	−11	−11	−11	−11	−12	−12	−12	−12	−13	−14	−14	−15	−15	−15	−16
(England) Westwood	−11	−12	−12	−11	−12	−12	−12	−12	−11	−11	−11	−11	−12	−12	−12	−12	−13	−13
(United States) Kim	−5	−6	−6	−6	−6	−5	−6	−7	−7	−7	−7	−7	−8	−9	−11	−12	−12	−12
(South Korea) Choi	−8	−9	−9	−9	−9	−10	−10	−11	−11	−12	−12	−12	−11	−10	−11	−11	−11	−11
(United States) Woods	−7	−7	−7	−6	−5	−5	−7	−8	−9	−9	−8	−8	−9	−8	−10	−10	−10	−11
(United States) Couples	−7	−8	−9	−9	−9	−9	−9	−9	−10	−10	−9	−7	−8	−9	−9	−8	−9	−9
(United States) Watney	−1	−2	−3	−3	−2	−3	−4	−5	−5	−5	−5	−5	−6	−6	−7	−7	−8	−8

Cumulative tournament scores, relative to par

Eagle	Birdie	Bogey	Double bogey
