= 2009 PGA Championship =

Coordinates: 44.834°N 93.591°W

Tournament information
- Dates: August 13–16, 2009
- Location: Chaska, Minnesota, U.S.
- Course: Hazeltine National Golf Club
- Organized by: PGA of America
- Tour(s): PGA Tour; European Tour; Japan Golf Tour

Statistics
- Par: 72
- Length: 7,674 yards (7,017 m)
- Field: 156 players, 80 after cut
- Cut: 148 (+4)
- Prize fund: $7,500,000 €5,328,337
- Winner's share: $1,350,000 €942,126

Champion
- (South Korea) Yang Yong-eun
- 280 (−8)

The 2009 PGA Championship was the 91st PGA Championship, held August 13–16 at Hazeltine National Golf Club in Chaska, Minnesota, a suburb southwest of Minneapolis.

Yang Yong-eun, more commonly referred to as "Y.E. Yang" in the U.S., won his only major title, three strokes ahead of runner-up Tiger Woods, a four-time champion. It marked the first (and only) time that Woods had failed to win a major he had led after 54 holes. Yang also became the first Asian-born player to win a men's major championship (although the third of Asian descent, after Vijay Singh and Woods).

It was the fourth major championship held at the course; it previously hosted the PGA Championship in 2002, won by Rich Beem, and two U.S. Opens (1970, 1991). The 2009 course was the longest up to that time for a major at 7,674 yards (7,017 m) (the 2012 and 2021 PGA Championships and 2017 U.S. Open all surpassed it). The average elevation of the course is approximately 940 feet (287 m) above sea level.

== Course layout ==
The 2009 PGA Championship at Hazeltine National Golf Club
Tee	Rating/Slope	1	2	3	4	5	6	7	8	9	Out	10	11	12	13	14	15	16	17	18	In	Total
Yardage	n/a	490	431	633	210	448	405	572	176	432	3,797	452	606	518	248	352	642	402	182	475	3,877	7,674
Par		4	4	5	3	4	4	5	3	4	36	4	5	4	3	4	5	4	3	4	36	72

Lengths of the course for previous majors:

- 7,360 yards (6,730 m), par 72 - 2002 PGA Championship
- 7,149 yards (6,537 m), par 72 - 1991 U.S. Open
- 7,151 yards (6,539 m), par 72 - 1970 U.S. Open

== Field ==
Location in the United States
Location in Minnesota

The following were the qualification criteria that were used to select the field. Each player is listed according to the first category by which he qualified, but other categories are shown in parentheses:

1. All former PGA Champions
Paul Azinger, Rich Beem, Mark Brooks, John Daly, Steve Elkington, Pádraig Harrington (4,6,8), Davis Love III (8,10), Shaun Micheel, Phil Mickelson (3,6,8,9,10), Vijay Singh (8,10), David Toms (6,8), Bob Tway, Tiger Woods (2,3,4,8,10)
(Eligible but not competing: Jack Burke Jr., Dow Finsterwald, Raymond Floyd, Doug Ford, Al Geiberger, Wayne Grady, David Graham, Hubert Green, Don January, John Mahaffey, Larry Nelson, Bobby Nichols, Jack Nicklaus, Gary Player, Nick Price, Jeff Sluman, Dave Stockton, Hal Sutton, Lee Trevino, Lanny Wadkins)

2. Last five U.S. Open Champions
Ángel Cabrera (3,8), Michael Campbell, Lucas Glover (8), Geoff Ogilvy (8,10)

3. Last five Masters Champions
Zach Johnson (8,10)

- Trevor Immelman withdrew prior to the championship with a wrist injury.

4. Last five British Open Champions
Stewart Cink (8,9,10)

5. Current Senior PGA Champion
Michael Allen

6. 15 low scorers and ties in the 2008 PGA Championship
Stuart Appleby (8), Aaron Baddeley, Ben Curtis (8,9), Ken Duke, Steve Flesch, Alastair Forsyth, Sergio García (8), Graeme McDowell, Prayad Marksaeng, Andrés Romero, Justin Rose, Jeev Milkha Singh, Henrik Stenson (8,10), Camilo Villegas (8,10), Charlie Wi (8)

- Paul Casey (8,10) withdrew prior to the championship due to a rib injury.

7. 20 low scorers in the 2009 PGA Professional National Championship
Sam Arnold, Ryan Benzel, Greg Bisconti, Keith Dicciani, Brian Gaffney, Bob Gaus, Scott Hebert, Todd Lancaster, Eric Lippert, Mitch Lowe, Mike Miles, Lee Rinker, Kevin Roman, Steve Schneiter, Mark Sheftic, Mike Small, Chris Starkjohann, Grant Sturgeon, Craig Thomas, Tim Weinhart

8. Top 70 leaders in official money standings from the 2008 WGC-Bridgestone Invitational and Legends Reno-Tahoe Open to the 2009 Buick Open
Robert Allenby, Stephen Ames, Woody Austin, Briny Baird, Cameron Beckman (10), Chad Campbell (9), K. J. Choi, Tim Clark, Ben Crane, Brian Davis, Luke Donald, Jason Dufner, Ernie Els, Jim Furyk (9), Brian Gay (10), Mathew Goggin, Retief Goosen (10), Paul Goydos, J. J. Henry, Charley Hoffman, Charles Howell III, Dustin Johnson (10), Jerry Kelly (10), Anthony Kim (9), Justin Leonard (9), Hunter Mahan (9), John Mallinger, Steve Marino, John Merrick, Kevin Na, Sean O'Hair (10), Jeff Overton, Pat Perez (10), Kenny Perry (9,10), Carl Pettersson (10), Ian Poulter, Brett Quigley, John Rollins (10), Rory Sabbatini (10), John Senden, Kevin Streelman, Steve Stricker (9,10), Kevin Sutherland, D. J. Trahan, Bo Van Pelt (10), Scott Verplank, Nick Watney (10), Bubba Watson, Mike Weir, Lee Westwood, Mark Wilson (10), Yang Yong-eun (10)

9. Members of the 2008 United States Ryder Cup team
J. B. Holmes, Boo Weekley

10. Winners of tournaments co-sponsored or approved by the PGA Tour since the 2008 PGA Championship
Michael Bradley, Nathan Green, Will MacKenzie, Ryan Palmer, Marc Turnesa

11. The PGA of America reserves the right to invite additional players not included in the categories listed above
Darren Clarke, Fred Couples, Nick Dougherty, Johan Edfors, Gonzalo Fernández-Castaño, Ross Fisher, Hiroyuki Fujita, Richard Green, Anders Hansen, Søren Hansen, Peter Hanson, Ryuji Imada, Ryo Ishikawa, Miguel Ángel Jiménez, Brendan Jones, Shingo Katayama, Martin Kaymer, Søren Kjeldsen, Tom Lehman, Thomas Levet, Rory McIlroy, Francesco Molinari, Colin Montgomerie, Louis Oosthuizen, Rod Pampling, Corey Pavin, Álvaro Quirós, Charl Schwartzel, Adam Scott, Michael Sim, David Smail, Brandt Snedeker, Richard Sterne, Thongchai Jaidee, Anthony Wall, Steve Webster, Oliver Wilson, Chris Wood

- Robert Karlsson withdrew prior to the championship due to an eye injury.

12. Vacancies are filled by the first available player from the list of alternates (those below 70th place in official money standings)

1. Scott McCarron (72) – took spot reserved for WGC-Bridgestone Invitational winner (Tiger Woods already eligible)
2. Matt Kuchar (73) – took spot reserved for Legends Reno-Tahoe Open winner (John Rollins already eligible)
3. Bob Estes (75) – replaced Trevor Immelman
4. Michael Letzig (78) – withdrew from alternate list
5. Tim Petrovic (79) – replaced Paul Casey

== Round summaries ==
=== First round ===
Thursday, August 13, 2009

Tiger Woods had the outright lead after a 67 on the first round, which included 5 birdies and no bogeys. Defending champion Pádraig Harrington, who played in the same group as Woods, was in second place after a 68. David Toms, 2001 champion, also started well. He made many long birdie putts and par saves to shoot a 69, placing him in a group of six tied for third place that also included two-time champion Vijay Singh. World number two Phil Mickelson struggled slightly, shooting a 2-over par 74. John Daly, 1991 champion, withdrew after posting a 78, citing a back injury.

Place	Player	Score	To par
1	(United States) Tiger Woods	67	−5
2	(Republic of Ireland) Pádraig Harrington	68	−4
T3	(Australia) Robert Allenby	69	−3
T3	(Australia) Mathew Goggin	69	−3
T3	(United States) Hunter Mahan	69	−3
T3	(Spain) Álvaro Quirós	69	−3
T3	(Fiji) Vijay Singh	69	−3
T3	(United States) David Toms	69	−3
T9	(United States) Michael Bradley	70	−2
T9	(United States) Ben Crane	70	−2
T9	(Spain) Gonzalo Fernández-Castaño	70	−2
T9	(United States) Paul Goydos	70	−2
T9	(Denmark) Søren Kjeldsen	70	−2
T9	(Northern Ireland) Graeme McDowell	70	−2
T9	(Thailand) Thongchai Jaidee	70	−2
T9	(England) Lee Westwood	70	−2

=== Second round ===
Friday, August 14, 2009

Tiger Woods broke away from the pack with a run of three straight birdies on the back nine, finishing the round with a four-shot lead. It is his largest margin after two rounds at a major since the 2005 British Open at St Andrews, when he led by five. Conditions on the second day were tough, with strong winds playing with putts and uneven greens. Vijay Singh, Lucas Glover and Brendan Jones, who moved up the leaderboard into second place, all played in the morning. The other two in the group tied for second place, Pádraig Harrington and Ross Fisher, had to cope with the fierce afternoon winds.

Place	Player	Score	To par
1	(United States) Tiger Woods	67-70=137	−7
T2	(England) Ross Fisher	73-68=141	−3
T2	(United States) Lucas Glover	71-70=141	−3
T2	(Republic of Ireland) Pádraig Harrington	68-73=141	−3
T2	(Australia) Brendan Jones	71-70=141	−3
T2	(Fiji) Vijay Singh	69-72=141	−3
T7	(England) Ian Poulter	72-70=142	−2
T7	(England) Lee Westwood	70-72=142	−2
T9	(South Africa) Ernie Els	75-68=143	−1
T9	(Germany) Martin Kaymer	73-70=143	−1
T9	(Denmark) Søren Kjeldsen	70-73=143	−1
T9	(South Korea) Yang Yong-eun	73-70=143	−1

=== Third round ===
Saturday, August 15, 2009

Tiger Woods played a safe round, avoiding throwing away shots. His lead was halved to two shots over Pádraig Harrington and 2009 Honda Classic winner Yang Yong-eun. Henrik Stenson, winner of that year's Players Championship, scored a round of 68 and was tied for fourth place along with U.S. Open champion Lucas Glover. Ernie Els was as close as one shot from the lead but finished with three straight bogeys.

Place	Player	Score	To par
1	(United States) Tiger Woods	67-70-71=208	−8
T2	(Republic of Ireland) Pádraig Harrington	68-73-69=210	−6
T2	(South Korea) Yang Yong-eun	73-70-67=210	−6
T4	(United States) Lucas Glover	71-70-71=212	−4
T4	(Sweden) Henrik Stenson	73-71-68=212	−4
T6	(South Africa) Ernie Els	75-68-70=213	−3
T6	(Denmark) Søren Kjeldsen	70-73-70=213	−3
T8	(England) Ross Fisher	73-68-73=214	−2
T8	(Australia) Brendan Jones	71-70-73=214	−2
T8	(Germany) Martin Kaymer	73-70-71=214	−2
T8	(Spain) Álvaro Quirós	69-76-69=214	−2
T8	(United States) John Rollins	73-73-68=214	−2

=== Final round ===
Sunday, August 16, 2009

Struggling with his putting all day, Tiger Woods was in jeopardy of losing a major for the first (and only) time when leading after 54 holes. The only player who was able to take advantage of this was Woods' playing partner, Yang Yong-eun. Defending champion Pádraig Harrington was in contention early, but made a quintuple-bogey 8 on the par-3 8th, causing him to fall from tied for 2nd to tied for 10th. Lucas Glover also reached contention, but faded with 4 bogeys in a span of 7 holes. Tied on the short par-4 14th, Yang chipped in for eagle from just off the green. The eagle gave Yang the lead which he did not relinquish. Yang sealed the victory by drawing a 210-yard (192 m) approach around a tree to within ten feet (3.0 m) on the final hole, setting up a birdie against Woods' closing bogey and a winning margin of three strokes.

Place	Player	Score	To par	Money ($)
1	(South Korea) Yang Yong-eun	73-70-67-70=280	−8	1,350,000
2	(United States) Tiger Woods	67-70-71-75=283	−5	810,000
T3	(Northern Ireland) Rory McIlroy	71-73-71-70=285	−3	435,000
T3	(England) Lee Westwood	70-72-73-70=285	−3	435,000
5	(United States) Lucas Glover	71-70-71-74=286	−2	300,000
T6	(South Africa) Ernie Els	75-68-70-74=287	−1	233,125
T6	(Germany) Martin Kaymer	73-70-71-73=287	−1	233,125
T6	(Denmark) Søren Kjeldsen	70-73-70-74=287	−1	233,125
T6	(Sweden) Henrik Stenson	73-71-68-75=287	−1	233,125
T10	(Republic of Ireland) Pádraig Harrington	68-73-69-78=288	E	150,633
T10	(United States) Dustin Johnson	72-73-73-70=288	E	150,633
T10	(United States) Zach Johnson	74-73-70-71=288	E	150,633
T10	(Northern Ireland) Graeme McDowell	70-75-71-72=288	E	150,633
T10	(United States) John Merrick	72-72-74-70=288	E	150,633
T10	(Italy) Francesco Molinari	74-73-69-72=288	E	150,633

Complete leaderboard

==== Scorecard ====
Final round

Hole	1	2	3	4	5	6	7	8	9	10	11	12	13	14	15	16	17	18
Par	4	4	5	3	4	4	5	3	4	4	5	4	3	4	5	4	3	4
(South Korea) Yang	−6	−6	−7	−7	−6	−6	−6	−6	−6	−6	−6	−6	−6	−8	−8	−8	−7	−8
(United States) Woods	−8	−8	−8	−7	−7	−7	−7	−6	−6	−6	−7	−6	−6	−7	−7	−7	−6	−5
(Northern Ireland) McIlroy	+1	+1	E	−1	−2	−2	−2	−2	−3	−3	−3	−2	−2	−3	−3	−3	−3	−3
(England) Westwood	−1	−1	−2	−2	−2	−1	−2	−2	−2	−2	−3	−2	−2	−3	−3	−3	−3	−3
(United States) Glover	−4	−4	−5	−5	−6	−5	−5	−4	−3	−3	−3	−2	−2	−3	−3	−3	−3	−2
(Sweden) Stenson	−4	−3	−3	−4	−3	−3	−4	−3	−3	−2	−3	−3	−3	−3	−3	−2	−1	−1
(Republic of Ireland) Harrington	−6	−6	−6	−6	−6	−6	−6	−1	−1	−1	−2	−1	−1	−1	−1	E	E	E

Cumulative tournament scores, relative to par

Eagle	Birdie	Bogey	Double bogey	Triple bogey+
