= 2009 U.S. Open (golf) =

Coordinates: 40.742°N 73.455°W

Tournament information
- Dates: June 18–22, 2009
- Location: Farmingdale, New York
- Courses: Bethpage State Park; Black Course
- Organized by: USGA
- Tours: PGA Tour; European Tour; Japan Golf Tour

Statistics
- Par: 70
- Length: 7,426 yards (6,790 m)
- Field: 156 players, 60 after cut
- Cut: 144 (+4)
- Prize fund: $7,500,000 €5,289,738
- Winner's share: $1,350,000 €952,153

Champion
- (United States) Lucas Glover
- 276 (−4)

Location in the United States
Location in New York

The 2009 United States Open Championship was the 109th U.S. Open, held June 18–22 on the Black Course of Bethpage State Park on Long Island, in Farmingdale, New York. Lucas Glover won his only major title, two strokes ahead of runners-up Ricky Barnes, David Duval, and Phil Mickelson.

This was the second U.S. Open at Bethpage Black; the first in 2002 was won by Tiger Woods, also the defending champion. The 2009 edition was hit heavily by continuous rain throughout the tournament, and resulted in multiple suspensions of play. Mickelson announced that this would be his last tournament for a while, before he took time off to tend to his ailing wife, Amy, who had been recently diagnosed with breast cancer.

== Course layout ==
Bethpage State Park - Black Course

Hole	Yards	Par	Hole	Yards	Par
1	430	4	10	508	4
2	389	4	11	435	4
3	232	3	12	504	4
4	517	5	13	605	5
5	478	4	14	158	3
6	408	4	15	459	4
7	525	4	16	490	4
8	210	3	17	207	3
9	460	4	18	411	4
Out	3,649	35	In	3,777	35
Source:		Total		7,426	70

== Field ==
About half the field each year consists of players who are fully exempt from qualifying for the U.S. Open. Below is the list of the 74 players who were fully exempt for the 2009 U.S. Open. Each player is classified according to the first category in which he qualified, but other categories are shown in parentheses. Also listed are the 81 players who qualified through sectional qualifying.

1. Last 10 U.S. Open Champions

Ángel Cabrera (3,14,17), Michael Campbell, Jim Furyk (9,10,17), Retief Goosen (8,11,17), Geoff Ogilvy (8,9,12,13,14,17), Tiger Woods (3,4,5,8,9,12,13,17)

2. Top two finishers in the 2008 U.S. Amateur

Drew Kittleson

- Danny Lee forfeited his exemption by turning professional.

3. Last five Masters Champions

Zach Johnson (12,13,17), Phil Mickelson (5,9,10,12,13,17)

- Trevor Immelman (9,10,17) withdrew with tendinitis in his left wrist and elbow.

4. Last five British Open Champions

Todd Hamilton, Pádraig Harrington (5,9,11,13,17)

5. Last five PGA Champions

Vijay Singh (9,10,13,17)

6. The Players Champion

Henrik Stenson (11,17)

7. The U.S. Senior Open Champion

Eduardo Romero

8. Top 15 finishers and ties in the 2008 U.S. Open

Eric Axley, Stewart Cink (9,10,17), Ernie Els (9,10,17), Miguel Ángel Jiménez (11,17), Rocco Mediate, John Merrick, Rod Pampling (16), Carl Pettersson (9,10), Heath Slocum, Brandt Snedeker, D. J. Trahan (9,10), Camilo Villegas (9,10,13,17), Lee Westwood (11,17)

- Robert Karlsson (11,17) withdrew with an eye infection.

9. Top 30 leaders on the 2008 PGA Tour official money list

Robert Allenby (10,17), Stephen Ames (17), Stuart Appleby (10), Chad Campbell (10,17), K. J. Choi (10,17), Ben Curtis (10,17), Ken Duke (10), Sergio García (10,11,17), Ryuji Imada (10), Anthony Kim (10,17), Justin Leonard (10,17), Hunter Mahan (10,17), Kenny Perry (10,12,13,17), Steve Stricker (10,17), Kevin Sutherland (10), Boo Weekley, Mike Weir (10,17)

- Dudley Hart (10) withdrew with a back injury.

10. All players qualifying for the 2008 edition of The Tour Championship

Briny Baird, Tim Clark (17), Billy Mayfair, Andrés Romero, Bubba Watson

11. Top 15 on the 2008 European Tour Order of Merit

Darren Clarke, Ross Fisher (14,17), Søren Hansen, Martin Kaymer (17), Graeme McDowell (17), Jeev Milkha Singh (17), Oliver Wilson (17)

- Søren Kjeldsen (17) withdrew with an ear infection.

12. Top 10 on the PGA Tour official money list, as of May 24

Paul Casey (14,17), Dustin Johnson (13,17), Sean O'Hair (17), Rory Sabbatini (17), Nick Watney (17)

13. Winners of multiple PGA Tour events from June 2, 2008, through June 14, 2009

Brian Gay

14. Top 5 from the 2009 European Tour Race to Dubai, as of May 24

Rory McIlroy (17)

15. Top 2 on the 2008 Japan Golf Tour official money list, provided they are within the top 75 point leaders of the Official World Golf Rankings at that time

Azuma Yano

- Shingo Katayama (17) withdrew with a back injury.

16. Top 2 on the 2008 PGA Tour of Australasia official money list, provided they are within the top 75 point leaders of the Official World Golf Rankings at that time

- Mark Brown, ranked 107th, did not qualify.

17. Top 50 on the Official World Golf Rankings list, as of May 24

Luke Donald, Gonzalo Fernández-Castaño, Ian Poulter, Álvaro Quirós, Justin Rose, Adam Scott, David Toms

18. Special exemptions selected by the USGA

None

Sectional qualifiers

- Japan: Bae Sang-moon, Shintaro Kai, Angelo Que, David Smail, Kaname Yokoo
- England: Richard Bland, Simon Dyson, Johan Edfors, Peter Hanson, David Horsey, Raphaël Jacquelin, Simon Khan, José Manuel Lara, Thomas Levet, Jean-François Lucquin, Andrew McLardy, Francesco Molinari
- United States

- Somis, California: Doug Batty (L), Mike Miles (L), Nathan Tyler (L), Charlie Wi
- Columbine Valley, Colorado: Stephen Allan, Charlie Beljan
- Orlando, Florida: Tyson Alexander (a,L), Josh McCumber (L), Gary Woodland (L)
- Ball Ground, Georgia: Matt Kuchar, Matt Nagy (a,L), Cameron Tringale (a,L)
- Grayslake, Illinois: Kyle Peterman (a,L)
- Overland Park, Kansas: Ryan Spears (L)
- Rockville, Maryland: Jeff Brehaut, Josh Brock (a,L), Fred Funk, Chris Kirk, Ben Martin (a,L), Michael Sim, Drew Weaver (a)
- Purchase, New York: Sean Farren (L), Trevor Murphy (L), Kevin Silva (L), Michael Welch (L)
- Columbus, Ohio: Ricky Barnes, Matt Bettencourt, Craig Bowden (L), Ben Crane, David Duval, Rickie Fowler (a), Lucas Glover, J. B. Holmes, James Kamte, Tom Lehman, John Mallinger, George McNeill, Ryan Moore, James Nitties, Charl Schwartzel (L), Kyle Stanley (a), Bo Van Pelt
- Dayton, Ohio: Clark Klaasen (a,L), Cortland Lowe (L), Vaughn Snyder (a,L), Cameron Yancey (L)
- Memphis, Tennessee: Cameron Beckman, Colby Beckstrom (L), Ryan Blaum (L), Scott Gutschewski, J. P. Hayes (L), J. J. Henry, Matt Jones, Greg Kraft, Martin Laird, Darron Stiles, Chris Stroud, Peter Tomasulo, Casey Wittenberg
- Dallas, Texas: Bronson Burgoon (a,L), Shawn Stefani (L)
- Roslyn, Washington: Andrew Parr, Nick Taylor (a)

Alternates who gained entry

- Andrew Svoboda (Purchase) – replaced Robert Karlsson
- Scott Lewis (a,L, Somis) – replaced Dudley Hart
- Clint Jensen (L, Columbine Valley) – replaced Trevor Immelman
- David Erdy (a,L, Dayton) – replaced Shingo Katayama
- Steve Conway (L, Roslyn) – replaced Søren Kjeldsen

(a) denotes amateur
(L) denotes player advanced through local qualifying

== Round summaries ==
=== First round ===
Thursday, June 18, 2009
Friday, June 19, 2009

Play began in the rain on Thursday morning, until play was suspended at 10:15 am, as several of the greens became unplayable with excessive water. Play was not restarted on Thursday, with the majority of players yet to tee off. Jeff Brehaut, through 10 holes, was one of four leading at 1-under par heading into Friday. Play was restarted on Friday morning and Mike Weir shot 64 (−6) to lead by two strokes at the end of the first round. Woods shot 74 (+4) with two double bogeys and three bogeys.

Place	Player	Score	To par
1	(Canada) Mike Weir	64	−6
2	(Sweden) Peter Hanson	66	−4
T3	(United States) Ricky Barnes	67	−3
T3	(United States) David Duval	67	−3
T3	(United States) Todd Hamilton	67	−3
6	(United States) Rocco Mediate	68	−2
T7	(United States) Lucas Glover	69	−1
T7	(United States) Sean O'Hair	69	−1
T7	(Northern Ireland) Graeme McDowell	69	−1
T7	(United States) Phil Mickelson	69	−1
T7	(Australia) Adam Scott	69	−1
T7	(United States) David Toms	69	−1
T7	(United States) Drew Weaver (a)	69	−1

=== Second round ===
Friday, June 19, 2009
Saturday, June 20, 2009

The round began at 5:00 pm on Friday afternoon and finished on Saturday afternoon. Because of the soft conditions caused by the heavy rain, many low scores were made during the second round. Ricky Barnes shot 65, and had a 36-hole record of 8-under par 132. Lucas Glover and Azuma Yano were also amongst the ones that shot very low scores. Woods shot 69 for 143 (+3), and Mickelson shot even par 70 to remain 1 under par at 139. The cut was at 144 (+4), the lowest at the U.S. Open since 2003, and was missed by major champions David Toms and Justin Leonard.

Place	Player	Score	To par
1	(United States) Ricky Barnes	67-65=132	−8
2	(United States) Lucas Glover	69-64=133	−7
3	(Canada) Mike Weir	64-70=134	−6
T4	(United States) David Duval	67-70=137	−3
T4	(Sweden) Peter Hanson	66-71=137	−3
T4	(Japan) Azuma Yano	72-65=137	−3
T7	(England) Ross Fisher	70-68=138	−2
T7	(United States) Todd Hamilton	67-71=138	−2
T7	(United States) Sean O'Hair	69-69=138	−2
T7	(Canada) Nick Taylor (a)	73-65=138	−2
T7	(England) Lee Westwood	72-66=138	−2

Amateurs: Taylor (-2), Weaver (+1), Stanley (+4), Fowler (+6), Tringale (+7), Alexander (+8), Klaasen (+10), Martin (+10), Erdy (+12), Burgoon (+13), Kittleson (+13), Snyder (+14), Nagy (+16), Peterman (+16), Lewis (+21), Brock (+22).

=== Third round ===
Saturday, June 20, 2009
Sunday, June 21, 2009

More heavy rain halted play at 6:55 pm on Saturday. The third round was resumed on Sunday at noon and completed in the late afternoon. Barnes and Glover both shot even par 70 to remain at the top of the leaderboard, while David Duval and Ross Fisher were five strokes back in a tie for third place. Weir struggled and fell back with a 74, Mickelson shot 69 to stay in contention, and Woods a 68 for 211 (+1), nine shots behind Barnes.

Place	Player	Score	To par
1	(United States) Ricky Barnes	67-65-70=202	−8
2	(United States) Lucas Glover	69-64-70=203	−7
T3	(United States) David Duval	67-70-70=207	−3
T3	(England) Ross Fisher	70-68-69=207	−3
T5	(United States) Hunter Mahan	72-68-68=208	−2
T5	(United States) Phil Mickelson	69-70-69=208	−2
T5	(Canada) Mike Weir	64-70-74=208	−2
T8	(South Africa) Retief Goosen	73-68-68=209	−1
T8	(United States) Todd Hamilton	67-71-71=209	−1
T8	(United States) Sean O'Hair	69-69-71=209	−1
T8	(United States) Bubba Watson	72-70-67=209	−1

=== Final round ===
Sunday, June 21, 2009
Monday, June 22, 2009

The final round began Sunday evening until play was suspended due to darkness, with leaders Barnes and Glover on the second hole. Play resumed Monday morning. Barnes, who had held the lead through the second and third rounds, faltered on the front nine on Monday morning, and bogeyed five of the first nine holes. He shot one over par on the back nine, but was never able to catch up with Glover, his playing partner for the final two rounds. Duval had a triple-bogey at the par-3 3rd, but rallied on the back nine with three straight birdies before bogeying 17 and missing a birdie putt at 18 to finish at 2 under par. Woods made a charge on the back nine with birdies on 13 and 14, but then bogeyed 15 and parred the rest to finish even par. Mickelson tied Glover for the lead after making an eagle at 13 after hitting a perfect second shot on the par 5, but proceeded to miss a short birdie putt on 14, three-putt for bogey on 15, miss another putt on 16, and made another bogey on 17 on his way to finishing two strokes behind Glover and tied for second place with Barnes and Duval. It was Mickelson's fifth runner-up finish at the U.S. Open, breaking the record of four by Sam Snead, Bobby Jones, Arnold Palmer, and Jack Nicklaus. (His sixth came four years later in 2013 at Merion.) Glover birdied 16 and parred the final two holes to seal the victory.

Place	Player	Score	To par	Money ($)
1	(United States) Lucas Glover	69-64-70-73=276	−4	1,350,000
T2	(United States) Ricky Barnes	67-65-70-76=278	−2	559,830
T2	(United States) David Duval	67-70-70-71=278	−2	559,830
T2	(United States) Phil Mickelson	69-70-69-70=278	−2	559,830
5	(England) Ross Fisher	70-68-69-72=279	−1	289,146
T6	(Denmark) Søren Hansen	70-71-70-69=280	E	233,350
T6	(United States) Hunter Mahan	72-68-68-72=280	E	233,350
T6	(United States) Tiger Woods	74-69-68-69=280	E	233,350
9	(Sweden) Henrik Stenson	73-70-70-68=281	+1	194,794
T10	(Canada) Stephen Ames	74-66-70-72=282	+2	154,600
T10	(United States) Matt Bettencourt	75-67-71-69=282	+2	154,600
T10	(Spain) Sergio García	70-70-72-70=282	+2	154,600
T10	(Northern Ireland) Rory McIlroy	72-70-72-68=282	+2	154,600
T10	(United States) Ryan Moore	70-69-72-71=282	+2	154,600
T10	(Canada) Mike Weir	64-70-74-74=282	+2	154,600

Amateurs: Taylor (+8), Weaver (+9), Stanley (+13).

==== Scorecard ====
Final round

Hole	1	2	3	4	5	6	7	8	9	10	11	12	13	14	15	16	17	18
Par	4	4	3	5	4	4	4	3	4	4	4	4	5	3	4	4	3	4
(United States) Glover	−7	−7	−6	−6	−5	−5	−5	−5	−4	−4	−4	−4	−4	−4	−3	−4	−4	−4
(United States) Barnes	−7	−7	−7	−7	−6	−5	−4	−3	−3	−3	−2	−1	−2	−2	−2	−2	−2	−2
(United States) Duval	−2	−2	+1	E	E	E	+1	E	E	E	E	E	E	−1	−2	−3	−2	−2
(United States) Mickelson	−2	−2	−2	−2	−2	−1	E	E	−1	−1	−1	−2	−4	−4	−3	−3	−2	−2
(England) Fisher	−2	−2	−2	−3	−2	−2	−1	−1	−2	−2	−2	−1	−3	−3	−2	−2	−1	−1
(Denmark) Hansen	E	E	+1	E	E	E	E	E	E	+1	+2	+2	+1	+1	+2	+2	+1	E
(United States) Mahan	−2	−2	−2	−3	−2	−3	−3	−2	−2	−1	−2	−2	−2	−2	−2	−1	E	E
(United States) Woods	+2	+1	+1	+1	+1	+1	E	E	E	+1	+1	+1	E	−1	E	E	E	E

Cumulative tournament scores, relative to par

Eagle	Birdie	Bogey	Double bogey	Triple bogey+
