= Drew Kittleson =

American golfer (born 1989)

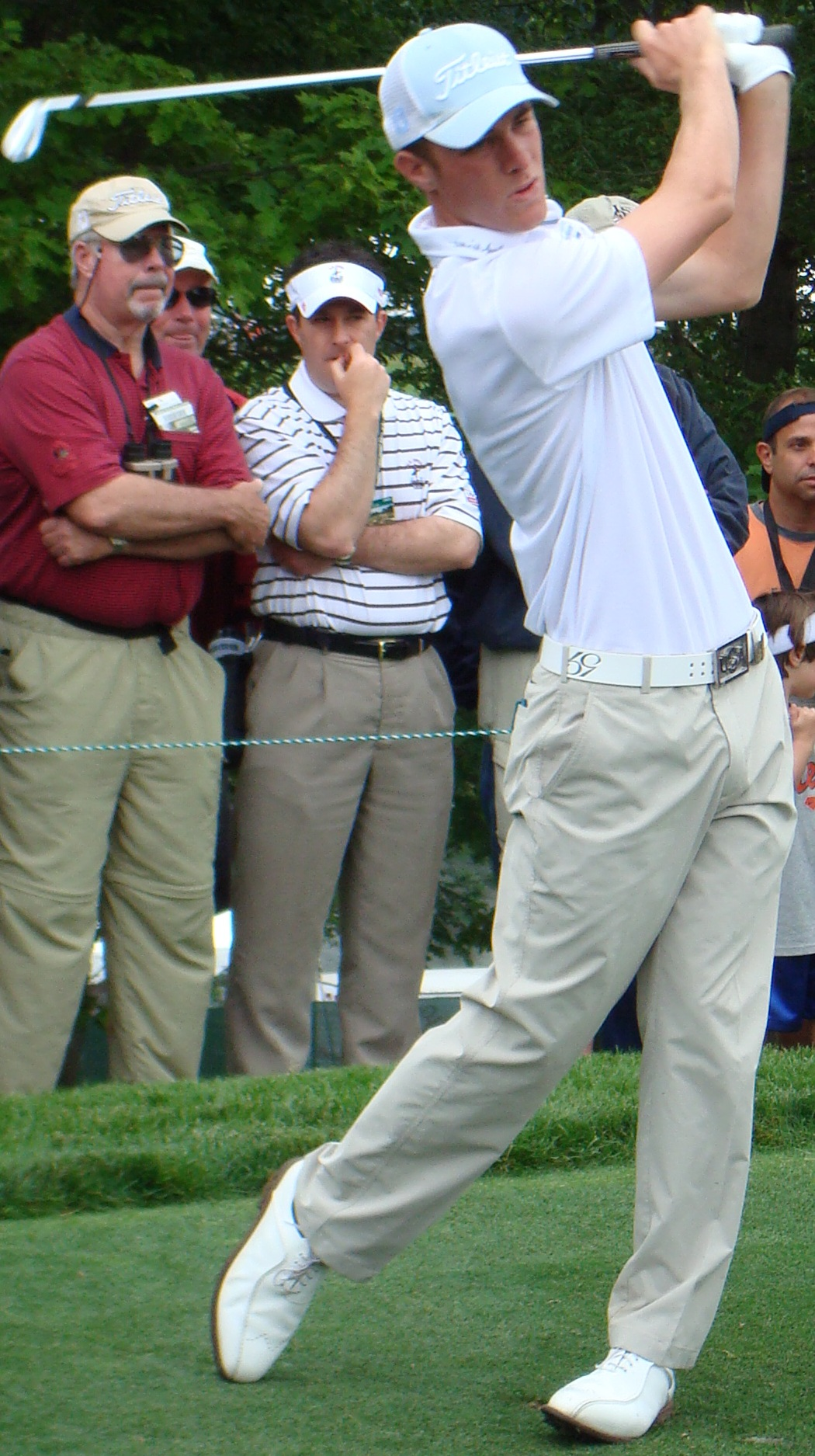
- Kittleson at the 2009 U.S. Open

Personal information
- Nationality: United States
- Born: April 2, 1989 (age 37) Scottsdale, Arizona, U.S.
- Height: 6 ft 2 in (1.88 m)

Career
- Sport: Golf
- College: Florida State University
- Turned professional: 2011 (regained amateur status in 2015)
- Former tour: PGA Tour Latinoamérica (2012)

Best results in major championships
- Masters Tournament: CUT: 2009
- PGA Championship: DNP
- U.S. Open: CUT: 2009
- The Open Championship: DNP

Drew Kittleson (born April 2, 1989) is an American former professional golfer from Scottsdale, Arizona.

Kittleson played college golf at Florida State University from 2007 to 2011. As a member of the Seminoles lineup, he helped the team win its first Atlantic Coast Conference golf championship in 2008.

Kittleson advanced to the finals of the 2008 U.S. Amateur at Pinehurst before falling to Danny Lee, 5 and 4. With the second-place finish, he qualified to play in the 2009 Masters Tournament at Augusta National and the 2009 U.S. Open at Bethpage Black Course.

Kittleson turned professional after graduating from FSU in 2011. He regained his amateur status in 2016.

== Amateur wins ==
- 2009 Golfweek Conference Challenge
- 2010 NCAA Central Region
- 2011 Gator Invitational, Seminole Intercollegiate
- 2025 George C. Thomas Invitational – Mid-Amateur

== Results in major championships ==
Tournament	2009
Masters Tournament	CUT
U.S. Open	CUT

CUT = missed the half-way cut

== U.S. national team appearances ==
Amateur

- Junior Ryder Cup: 2006
