= Lucas Glover =

American professional golfer (born 1979)

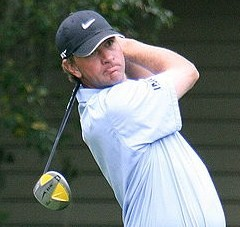

Personal information
- Full name: Lucas Hendley Glover
- Nationality: United States
- Born: November 12, 1979 (age 46) Greenville, South Carolina, U.S.
- Height: 6 ft 2 in (1.88 m)
- Weight: 195 lb (88 kg; 13.9 st)
- Spouse: Krista Glover (née Wakefield)
- Children: 2

Career
- Sport: Golf
- College: Clemson University
- Turned professional: 2001
- Current tour: PGA Tour
- Professional wins: 9
- Highest ranking: 15 (August 16, 2009)

Number of wins by tour
- PGA Tour: 6
- European Tour: 1
- Korn Ferry Tour: 1
- Other: 2

Best results in major championships (wins: 1)
- Masters Tournament: T20: 2007, 2024
- PGA Championship: 5th: 2009
- U.S. Open: Won: 2009
- The Open Championship: T12: 2011

Lucas Hendley Glover (born November 12, 1979) is an American professional golfer who currently plays on the PGA Tour. He is best known for winning the 2009 U.S. Open.

== Early life and amateur career ==
In 1979, Glover was born in Greenville, South Carolina. He is the son of Ron Musselman, then a professional baseball player, and Hershey Hendley. Hendley's father was former pro football player Dick Hendley. Glover was introduced to golf by his grandfather, Dick Hendley, at the age of three.

In 1981, Musselman and Hendley separated, when Lucas was two, and divorced the following year. Musselman had a career as a major league baseball player from 1982 to 1985, but after his baseball career ended, Musselman fell behind on child support payments and went more than six months without seeing his son. This led to a loss of parental rights after the matter went to court in 1992; Musselman also was barred from seeing Lucas, then 13, until he turned 18. Meanwhile, Hendley remarried to Jim Glover, and Lucas Glover today only recognizes his stepfather, Jim Glover, as his father.

Glover attended Wade Hampton High School. He was a three-time High School All-American. He won the South Carolina State High School championship as a freshman and sophomore and finished the runner up as a junior and senior. Glover was All-State for all four years of high school.

== Amateur career ==
Glover attended Clemson University from 1998 to 2001, where he was a brother of Alpha Tau Omega. He was named first-team All-American in 2000 and 2001 and honorable mention All-American in 1999.

Glover was also a member of the 2001 United States Walker Cup team and the 1999 USA vs. Japan Cup Team. He won three college tournaments and also won the South Carolina Amateur in 1998, 1999, and 2000 and the Sunnehanna Amateur in 2001.

In 2001, Glover graduated from Clemson.

== Professional career ==
=== Nationwide Tour ===
In 2001, Glover turned professional. He joined the Nationwide Tour in 2002, making 7 of 12 cuts while recording two top-10 finishes and five top-25 finishes in his rookie season. He earned $64,692 and finished 67th on the money list. Glover went to PGA Tour qualifying school for the first time where he finished tied for 39th which was not good enough to earn his tour card.

2003 was Glover's breakthrough year on the Nationwide Tour. He made 17 of 26 cuts while recording six top-10 finishes and 7 top-25 finishes. He picked up his first Nationwide Tour win at the Gila River Classic at Wild Horse Pass Resort. This win helped Glover finish 17th on the money list with $193,989. Glover's high finish on the money list earned him his PGA Tour card for 2004.

=== PGA Tour ===
In his rookie season on tour, Glover made 17 of 30 cuts while recording two top-10s and five top-25s. His best finishes came at the Wachovia Championship and the FUNAI Classic at the Walt Disney World Resort where he finished in a tie for 10th. He earned $557,454 and finished 134th on the money list, just shy of the top 125 which would have earned him his tour card for 2005. This forced him to go back to Q-School, although he was ultimately able to regain his card.

Glover had a much better second year on tour. He made 16 of 28 cuts while recording 7 top-10 finishes and 9 top-25 finishes. He picked up his first PGA Tour victory at the FUNAI Classic at the Walt Disney World Resort in dramatic fashion by holing a 35-yard bunker shot on the 18th hole for birdie to avoid a playoff with Tom Pernice Jr. Glover went on to finish 30th on the money list with earnings of $2,050,068.

Despite not winning an event in 2006, Glover played well on tour. He made 23 of 31 cuts and finished in the top-10 9 times and the top-25 17 times. His most impressive finish came at the WGC-Bridgestone Invitational where he finished in a tie for fourth. Another impressive finish came at The Tour Championship where he finished in a tie for eighth. He also made his first cut in a major at the PGA Championship where he finished in a tie for 46th. Glover earned $2,587,982 in 2006 and finished 31st on the money list. He was ranked in and out of the top 50 of Official World Golf Rankings during the year.

2007 was another good year for Glover. He made the cut in 22 of 29 events and recorded three top-10s and 13 top-25s. His best finish came at the PODS Championship where he finished in a tie for fourth. Glover earned $1,664,167 on the year and finished 53rd on the money list. He was selected for the 2007 Presidents Cup where the United States defeated the International team 19½ to 14½. Glover went 2–3 in his matches.

2008 was not as successful as previous years for Glover. He made 20 of 26 cuts but only recorded two top-10s and eight top-25s. His best finishes came at the Verizon Heritage and the Buick Open where he finished in a tie for 7th. He earned $998,491 in 2008 and finished 105th on the money list.

In February, Glover finished in a tie for third at the Buick Invitational. In May, he finished in a tie for second at the Quail Hollow Championship.

=== 2009 U.S. Open ===
Glover won the 2009 U.S. Open at the Bethpage Black Course (Farmingdale, New York) by two strokes over Phil Mickelson, Ricky Barnes, and David Duval. He was a surprise winner of the event, being ranked 71st in the Official World Golf Ranking and never having made a cut in his three previous U.S. Open appearances. Glover was one of just a handful of players who won the U.S. Open after having to play in a sectional qualifier. He shot a second round 64, tying the low round of the week with Mike Weir. Glover entered the final round one stroke behind 54-hole leader Ricky Barnes but in tough conditions on Monday's final round, both Glover and Barnes struggled. Coming to the 16th hole, Glover was 4 over for the day without a birdie but that would soon change. He hit his approach shot to within 6 feet of the hole and made the putt to take a lead he would not relinquish. After sinking a 3-foot putt for par on 18, Glover won by a margin of two strokes. The win propelled him to 18th in the world rankings.

Glover would be honored for his U.S. Open win at a Clemson Alumni Association meeting in Greenville at Fluor Field the following month. He was the first Clemson graduate and the first native South Carolinian to win a major professional golf championship.

=== Continued PGA Tour career ===
After his victory at Bethpage, Glover finished in a tie for 11th at the Travelers Championship the following week. The week after that, Glover finished in a tie for 5th at the AT&T National, moving Glover into the top 10 of the money list. In August, Glover finished 5th at the PGA Championship.

In October 2009, Glover won the PGA Grand Slam of Golf in Bermuda. The event featured the four major winners of 2009, Glover, Ángel Cabrera, Stewart Cink and Y. E. Yang. Glover won the two-day event by five strokes over Cabrera. Glover also earned his second President's Cup bid.

On May 8, 2011, Glover defeated Jonathan Byrd, another former Clemson star, in a playoff to win the Wells Fargo Championship. This was his first official win on Tour since the 2009 U.S. Open.

A left knee injury limited Glover to 16 events in 2012. He made six cuts with a season best of T46. He did not lose his Tour card due to the fact that he had two years remaining on the exemption from his U.S. Open win.

Glover finished the 2014–15 season 147th in the FedEx Cup. His exemptions for winning the U.S. Open and Wells Fargo Championship had run out. Glover had to either regain his PGA Tour card through the Web.com Tour Finals or play out of the conditional (126th–150th in the FedEx Cup) category for the 2015–16 season. Glover finished 14th in the finals, regaining his Tour card.

Glover earned $948,927 during the 2015–16 PGA Tour Season. He finished 106th in the FedEx Cup and kept his PGA Tour card. His best finish was 8th in the Wells Fargo Championship.

Glover earned $1,955,822 in 26 events during the 2016–17 PGA Tour Season. He finished 43rd in the season long FedEx Cup and kept his PGA Tour card. His best finish was third in the Shriners Hospitals for Children Open.

Glover finished the 2017–18 PGA Tour Season 135th in the season long FedEx Cup. He made $789,382 in 18 tournaments, with 15 made cuts. Glover returned to the Web.com Tour Finals, where he finished 8th, thus regaining his PGA Tour card for the 2018–19 PGA Tour season.

Glover started the 2018–19 PGA Tour Season with a T17 at the Safeway Open and T14 at the Sanderson Farms Championship. On November 3, 2018, during the third round of the Shriners Hospitals for Children Open, Glover shot 61 (10-under-par). He started his round with a bogey at the 10th but managed seven birdies and a pair of eagles from that point on. This matched his career-low round on the PGA Tour (9-under 61 in round 2 of the 2016 Wyndham Championship). Glover entered the final round in third place. In the fourth round, Glover shot 71 and finished in T7. Glover then finished in the top 12 finishers in 5 of his next 6 PGA Tour starts, this included a T4 at the 2019 Honda Classic. As of March 12, 2019, Glover had earned $1,372,193 for the season, good for 23rd on the money list.

In July 2021, Glover won the John Deere Classic by two shots. In the final round, Glover shot seven-under par 64. This ended a drought of 10 years without a win on the PGA Tour.

In June 2023, after years of struggling with the yips while putting, Glover switched from a traditional putter to a longer putter similar to the one used by Adam Scott. This led to a drastic improvement in results for Glover, including three consecutive top-10 finishes in July.

In August 2023, Glover won the Wyndham Championship by two shots. In the final round, he shot two-under-par 68, for rounds of 66, 64, 62, 68 for a 20-under-par total. The win secured Glover a place in the season ending FedExCup Playoffs. One week later, Glover won the FedEx St. Jude Championship in a playoff over Patrick Cantlay. With the win, Glover became the 3rd player in his 40s to win back-to-back weeks on PGA Tour in the last 25 years.

== Personal life ==
Glover has lived in St. Simons Island, Georgia, Simpsonville, South Carolina, and Tequesta, Florida. He has two children with his wife Krista.

Krista was arrested and charged with domestic violence and resisting arrest in Ponte Vedra, Florida during the 2018 Players Championship. Several months after the incident was over, Glover made a public statement that his wife is not on probation nor will she have to proceed with substance abuse or mental health evaluation. He also added that she never hit him.

== Amateur wins ==
- 1998 South Carolina Amateur
- 1999 South Carolina Amateur
- 2000 South Carolina Amateur
- 2001 Sunnehanna Amateur

== Professional wins (9) ==
=== PGA Tour wins (6) ===
Legend
Major championships (1)
FedEx Cup playoff events (1)
Other PGA Tour (5)

No.	Date	Tournament	Winning score	Margin of victory	Runner(s)-up
1	Oct 23, 2005	Funai Classic at the Walt Disney World Resort	−23 (68-66-66-65=265)	1 stroke	(United States) Tom Pernice Jr.
2	Jun 22, 2009	U.S. Open	−4 (69-64-70-73=276)	2 strokes	(United States) Ricky Barnes, (United States) David Duval, (United States) Phil Mickelson
3	May 8, 2011	Wells Fargo Championship	−15 (67-68-69-69=273)	Playoff	(United States) Jonathan Byrd
4	Jul 11, 2021	John Deere Classic	−19 (68-63-70-64=265)	2 strokes	(United States) Ryan Moore, (United States) Kevin Na
5	Aug 6, 2023	Wyndham Championship	−20 (66-64-62-68=260)	2 strokes	(South Korea) An Byeong-hun, (United States) Russell Henley
6	Aug 13, 2023	FedEx St. Jude Championship	−15 (66-64-66-69=265)	Playoff	(United States) Patrick Cantlay

PGA Tour playoff record (2–0)

No.	Year	Tournament	Opponent	Result
1	2011	Wells Fargo Championship	(United States) Jonathan Byrd	Won with par on first extra hole
2	2023	FedEx St. Jude Championship	(United States) Patrick Cantlay	Won with par on first extra hole

=== Nationwide Tour wins (1) ===
No.	Date	Tournament	Winning score	Margin of victory	Runners-up
1	Oct 12, 2003	Gila River Classic	−18 (67-69-67-67=270)	1 stroke	(United States) John Elliott, (United States) Robin Freeman, (United States) Tommy Tolles

=== Other wins (2) ===
No.	Date	Tournament	Winning score	Margin of victory	Runner(s)-up
1	Sep 23, 2001	Oklahoma Open	−9 (66-65-70=201)	3 strokes	(United States) Grant Masson, (United States) Albert Ochoa
2	Oct 21, 2009	PGA Grand Slam of Golf	−11 (65-66=131)	5 strokes	(Argentina) Ángel Cabrera

== Major championships ==
=== Wins (1) ===
Year	Championship	54 holes	Winning score	Margin	Runners-up
2009	U.S. Open	1 shot deficit	−4 (69-64-70-73=276)	2 strokes	(United States) Ricky Barnes, (United States) David Duval, (United States) Phil Mickelson

=== Results timeline ===
Results not in chronological order in 2020.

Tournament	2002	2003	2004	2005	2006	2007	2008	2009
Masters Tournament					CUT	T20		
U.S. Open	CUT				CUT	CUT		1
The Open Championship					CUT	T27	T78	CUT
PGA Championship				CUT	T46	T50		5

Tournament	2010	2011	2012	2013	2014	2015	2016	2017	2018
Masters Tournament	T36	CUT	CUT	49	T42				
U.S. Open	T58	T42	CUT	CUT	CUT	CUT	CUT	CUT	CUT
The Open Championship	T48	T12	CUT	CUT					
PGA Championship	CUT	CUT	CUT	CUT				T33	

Tournament	2019	2020	2021	2022	2023	2024	2025	2026
Masters Tournament		CUT		T30		T20	CUT	
PGA Championship	T16	CUT		T23		T43	T37	CUT
U.S. Open	CUT	T17				CUT	CUT	
The Open Championship	T20	NT	CUT			CUT	T23	

Win
Top 10
Did not play

CUT = missed the half way cut
"T" indicates a tie for a place
NT = no tournament due to COVID-19 pandemic

=== Summary ===
Tournament	Wins	2nd	3rd	Top-5	Top-10	Top-25	Events	Cuts made
Masters Tournament	0	0	0	0	0	2	11	6
PGA Championship	0	0	0	1	1	3	15	8
U.S. Open	1	0	0	1	1	2	17	4
The Open Championship	0	0	0	0	0	3	12	6
Totals	1	0	0	2	2	10	55	24

- Most consecutive cuts made – 4 (three times)
- Longest streak of top-10s – 1 (twice)

== Results in The Players Championship ==
Tournament	2006	2007	2008	2009
The Players Championship	CUT	CUT	CUT	CUT

Tournament	2010	2011	2012	2013	2014	2015	2016	2017	2018	2019
The Players Championship	3	T50	CUT	CUT	CUT			T6	T72	CUT

Tournament	2020	2021	2022	2023	2024	2025	2026
The Players Championship	C	T48	CUT	T51	CUT	T3	CUT

Top 10
Did not play

CUT = missed the halfway cut
"T" indicates a tie for a place
C = canceled after the first round due to the COVID-19 pandemic

== Results in World Golf Championships ==
Results not in chronological order before 2015.

Tournament	2006	2007	2008	2009	2010	2011	2012	2013	2014	2015	2016	2017	2018	2019	2020	2021
Championship	T13	T26			T56										T61	
Match Play	R64	R64			R64										NT^{1}	
Invitational	T4		T63	T19	T22	T23										T57
Champions						T20						T50		T49	NT^{1}	NT^{1}

^{1}Cancelled due to COVID-19 pandemic

Top 10
Did not play

QF, R16, R32, R64 = Round in which player lost in match play
NT = No tournament
"T" = Tied
Note that the HSBC Champions did not become a WGC event until 2009.

== PGA Tour career summary ==
Season	Wins (Majors)	Earnings ($)	Rank
2001	0	6,180	n/a
2002	0	16,349	n/a
2003	0	0	n/a
2004	0	557,454	134
2005	1	2,050,068	30
2006	0	2,587,982	21
2007	0	1,664,167	48
2008	0	998,491	105
2009	1 (1)	3,692,580	9
2010	0	1,511,275	57
2011	1	1,823,327	48
2012	0	67,112	216
2013	0	747,812	108
2014	0	210,166	182
2015	0	515,241	156
2016	0	948,927	110
2017	0	1,955,822	48
2018	0	789,382	131
2019	0	2,613,965	36
2020	0	728,355	118
2021	1	2,577,704	46
2022	0	1,941,797	68
2023*	2	6,133,875	19
Career*	6 (1)	34,138,031	30

*Through August 14, 2023 season.

- Glover was not a member of the PGA Tour until 2004.

== U.S. national team appearances ==
Amateur

- Palmer Cup: 2000, 2001 (winners)
- Walker Cup: 2001

Professional

- Presidents Cup: 2007 (winners), 2009 (winners)

== See also ==
- 2003 Nationwide Tour graduates
- 2004 PGA Tour Qualifying School graduates
- 2015 Web.com Tour Finals graduates
- 2018 Web.com Tour Finals graduates
