= 2009 Masters Tournament =

- Front cover of the 2009 Masters Journal

Tournament information
- Dates: April 9–12, 2009
- Location: Augusta, Georgia; 33.503°N 82.020°W
- Course: Augusta National Golf Club
- Organized by: Augusta National Golf Club
- Tours: PGA Tour; European Tour; Japan Golf Tour

Statistics
- Par: 72
- Length: 7,435 yards (6,799 m)
- Field: 96 players, 50 after cut
- Cut: 145 (+1)
- Prize fund: US$7,500,000
- Winner's share: $1,350,000

Champion
- (Argentina) Ángel Cabrera
- 276 (−12), playoff
- Location in the United States Location in Georgia

The 2009 Masters Tournament was the 73rd Masters Tournament, held April 9–12 at Augusta National Golf Club in Augusta, Georgia. Ángel Cabrera, age 39, won his second major title in a playoff over Chad Campbell and Kenny Perry. Cabrera became the first (and only) Masters champion from Argentina and South America.

This was the final Masters appearance for three-time champion Gary Player, and one-time champions Raymond Floyd and Fuzzy Zoeller.

== Course ==
Hole	Name	Yards	Par	Hole	Name	Yards	Par
1	Tea Olive	445	4	10	Camellia	495	4
2	Pink Dogwood	575	5	11	White Dogwood	505	4
3	Flowering Peach	350	4	12	Golden Bell	155	3
4	Flowering Crab Apple	240	3	13	Azalea	510	5
5	Magnolia	455	4	14	Chinese Fir	440	4
6	Juniper	180	3	15	Firethorn	530	5
7	Pampas	450	4	16	Redbud	170	3
8	Yellow Jasmine	570	5	17	Nandina	440	4
9	Carolina Cherry	460	4	18	Holly	465	4
Out		3,725	36	In		3,710	36
				Total		7,435	72

== Field ==
The Masters has the smallest field of the major championships, and officially remains an invitation event, but there is now a qualification process. In theory, the club could simply decline to invite a qualified player. This is the list of all 96 players who qualified to play in the 2009 Masters Tournament.

1. Past Masters Champions
Fred Couples, Ben Crenshaw, Raymond Floyd, Trevor Immelman (10,14,16,17,18), Zach Johnson (15,17,18), Bernhard Langer, Sandy Lyle, Phil Mickelson (4,5,10,14,15,16,17,18), Larry Mize, José María Olazábal, Mark O'Meara, Gary Player, Vijay Singh (4,10,14,15,16,17,18), Craig Stadler, Tom Watson, Mike Weir (14,16,17,18), Tiger Woods (2,3,4,10,11,14,15,17,18), Ian Woosnam, Fuzzy Zoeller

(Past champions who did not play: Tommy Aaron, Seve Ballesteros, Jack Burke Jr., Billy Casper, Charles Coody, Nick Faldo, Doug Ford, Bob Goalby, Jack Nicklaus, and Arnold Palmer.)

2. Last five U.S. Open Champions
Ángel Cabrera (17), Michael Campbell, Retief Goosen (15,17,18), Geoff Ogilvy (14,15,17,18)

3. Last five British Open Champions
Todd Hamilton, Pádraig Harrington (4,10,12,13,14,17,18)

4. Last five PGA Champions

5. Last two of The Players Champions
Sergio García (13,14,16,17,18)

6. Top two finishers in the 2008 U.S. Amateur
Drew Kittleson (a), Danny Lee (a)

7. Winner of the 2008 Amateur Championship
Reinier Saxton (a)

8. Winner of the 2008 U.S. Amateur Public Links
Jack Newman (a)

9. Winner of the 2008 U.S. Mid-Amateur
Steve Wilson (a)

10. The top 16 finishers and ties in the 2008 Masters Tournament
Stuart Appleby (14,16,17), Paul Casey (15,17,18), Stewart Cink (14,15,16,17,18), Steve Flesch, Miguel Ángel Jiménez (11,17,18), Robert Karlsson (11,17,18), Sean O'Hair (18), Andrés Romero (16,17,18), Brandt Snedeker, Nick Watney (15,18), Lee Westwood (11,17,18)

11. Top 8 finishers and ties in the 2008 U.S. Open
Rocco Mediate, John Merrick, Carl Pettersson (14,15,16), D. J. Trahan (14,16)

12. Top 4 finishers and ties in the 2008 British Open Championship
Greg Norman, Ian Poulter (17,18), Henrik Stenson (13,17,18)

13. Top 4 finishers and ties in the 2008 PGA Championship
Ben Curtis (14,16,17,18), Camilo Villegas (14,15,16,17,18)

14. Top 30 leaders on the 2008 PGA Tour
Robert Allenby (16,17,18), Stephen Ames (17,18), Chad Campbell (16), K. J. Choi (16,17,18), Ken Duke (16), Ernie Els (16,17,18), Jim Furyk (16,17,18), Dudley Hart (16), Ryuji Imada (15,16), Anthony Kim (15,16,17,18), Justin Leonard (15,16,17,18), Hunter Mahan (16,17), Kenny Perry (15,16,17,18), Steve Stricker (16,17,18), Kevin Sutherland (16), Boo Weekley (15,17)

15. Winners of PGA Tour events that award a full-point allocation for the season-ending Tour Championship, between the 2008 Masters Tournament and the 2009 Masters Tournament
Dustin Johnson (18), Pat Perez (18), Chez Reavie, Adam Scott (17,18), Y. E. Yang

16. All players qualifying for the 2008 edition of The Tour Championship
Briny Baird, Tim Clark (17,18), Billy Mayfair, Bubba Watson

17. Top 50 on the final 2008 Official World Golf Rankings list
Aaron Baddeley, Luke Donald (18), Ross Fisher (18), Søren Hansen, Shingo Katayama (18), Martin Kaymer (18), Søren Kjeldsen (18), Graeme McDowell (18), Rory McIlroy (18), Justin Rose (18), Rory Sabbatini (18), Jeev Milkha Singh (18), Richard Sterne, Lin Wen-tang, Oliver Wilson (18)

18. Top 50 on the Official World Golf Rankings list going into the tournament
Mathew Goggin, Prayad Marksaeng, Louis Oosthuizen, Álvaro Quirós

19. International invitees
Ryo Ishikawa

- Raymond Floyd, Greg Norman, Gary Player, and Fuzzy Zoeller were playing their final Masters event. Ryo Ishikawa, aged 17, became the youngest professional ever to appear in the Masters.

== Par 3 contest ==
The annual par 3 contest was held on Wednesday, April 8. Tim Clark won with a score of -5 (22), two shots better than José María Olazábal and Jack Newman. Three players shot a hole-in-one: John Merrick on the second hole, Greg Norman on the sixth, and Clark on the ninth. (Note: Though technically not a hole in one, Gary Player hit into the water on the ninth tee, and then holed it for a score of three from the tee box.)

== Round summaries ==
The Masters Tournament is played over four days with an 18-hole round being played each day, for a total of 72 holes plus practice rounds and a par-three contest on the neighboring par-three course. Everyone outside the top 44 and ties or outside ten strokes of the leader was "cut" after two rounds.

=== First round ===
Thursday, April 9, 2009

The first round weather conditions were sunny and calm. Chad Campbell, scored a 7 under par 65, which included five straight birdies in the first five holes. Campbell finished the day with a one stroke lead over Jim Furyk and Hunter Mahan. Larry Mize shot a five under par 67 to be two strokes behind. Mahan led the field in total birdies with 9 in the first round.

Place	Player	Score	To par
1	(United States) Chad Campbell	65	−7
T2	(United States) Jim Furyk	66	−6
T2	(United States) Hunter Mahan	66	−6
T4	(Japan) Shingo Katayama	67	−5
T4	(United States) Larry Mize	67	−5
T6	(Australia) Aaron Baddeley	68	−4
T6	(Argentina) Ángel Cabrera	68	−4
T6	(South Africa) Tim Clark	68	−4
T6	(United States) Todd Hamilton	68	−4
T6	(United States) John Merrick	68	−4
T6	(United States) Sean O'Hair	68	−4
T6	(United States) Kenny Perry	68	−4
T6	(Canada) Mike Weir	68	−4

=== Second round ===
Friday, April 10, 2009

Campbell continued his strong play with a 2 under par 70 to remain in the lead at 135 (−9) with Kenny Perry, who shot a bogey-free 67. Raymond Floyd, 1976 champion, Fuzzy Zoeller, 1979 champion, and three-time winner Gary Player completed their final rounds at Augusta. Anthony Kim shot the day's low round with a 65, which included a new record for most birdies in a round with eleven.

The cut, the top 44 players and ties, was at 145 (+1), and fifty players advanced to the weekend. In all, 25 players shot sub-par rounds for the day and the scoring average was 73.74. For the tournament, 32 players were under par, and the scoring average was 72.99.

Place	Player	Score	To par
T1	(United States) Chad Campbell	65-70=135	−9
T1	(United States) Kenny Perry	68-67=135	−9
3	(Argentina) Ángel Cabrera	68-68=136	−8
4	(United States) Todd Hamilton	68-70=138	−6
5	(South Africa) Tim Clark	68-71=139	−5
T6	(United States) Jim Furyk	66-74=140	−4
T6	(Spain) Sergio García	73-67=140	−4
T6	(Japan) Shingo Katayama	67-73=140	−4
T6	(United States) Anthony Kim	75-65=140	−4
T6	(South Africa) Rory Sabbatini	73-67=140	−4

Amateurs: Saxton (+3), Newman (+4), Kittleson (+6), Wilson (+10), Lee (+11).

=== Third round ===
Saturday, April 11, 2009

Third round conditions were sunny, but with gusty winds that made scoring a bit tougher than the previous two days. Perry shot a two-under par 70 to remain in the lead at 205 (-11), with Ángel Cabrera who shot a 69. Campbell led for most of the day until a double bogey on the 16th hole and carded 72, two strokes back at 207. Jim Furyk finished another stroke back of Campbell. Five players shot the day's low round of 4 under par 68. Those players were: Jim Furyk -8, Steve Stricker -7, Sean O'Hair -4, Ian Poulter -4, and Steve Flesch -3.

Place	Player	Score	To par
T1	(Argentina) Ángel Cabrera	68-68-69=205	−11
T1	(United States) Kenny Perry	68-67-70=205	−11
3	(United States) Chad Campbell	65-70-72=207	−9
4	(United States) Jim Furyk	66-74-68=208	−8
5	(United States) Steve Stricker	72-69-68=209	−7
T6	(United States) Todd Hamilton	68-70-72=210	−6
T6	(Japan) Shingo Katayama	67-73-70=210	−6
T6	(South Africa) Rory Sabbatini	73-67-70=210	−6
9	(South Africa) Tim Clark	68-71-72=211	−5
T10	(Canada) Stephen Ames	73-68-71=212	−4
T10	(United States) Anthony Kim	75-65-72=212	−4
T10	(United States) Hunter Mahan	66-75-71=212	−4
T10	(United States) Phil Mickelson	73-68-71=212	−4
T10	(United States) Sean O'Hair	68-76-68=212	−4
T10	(England) Ian Poulter	71-73-68=212	−4
T10	(United States) Nick Watney	70-71-71=212	−4
T10	(England) Lee Westwood	70-72-70=212	−4
T10	(United States) Tiger Woods	70-72-70=212	−4

=== Final round ===
Sunday, April 12, 2009

==== Summary ====
External videos
- Full final round coverage on CBS on YouTube

Phil Mickelson birdied six holes on the front nine to score 30, tying the front-nine tournament record held by Johnny Miller, Greg Norman, and K. J. Choi. Third round co-leader Perry, age 48, led for most of the day; after birdies at 15 and 16, he disappointingly finished with bogeys at 17 and 18. He fell into a three-way tie at 276 (−12) with Cabrera and Campbell, leading to a sudden-death playoff.

==== Final leaderboard ====
Champion
(a) = amateur
(c) = past champion

Top 10
Place	Player	Score	To par	Money (US$)
T1	(Argentina) Ángel Cabrera	68-68-69-71=276	−12	Playoff
T1	(United States) Chad Campbell	65-70-72-69=276	−12	Playoff
T1	(United States) Kenny Perry	68-67-70-71=276	−12	Playoff
4	(Japan) Shingo Katayama	67-73-70-68=278	−10	360,000
5	(United States) Phil Mickelson (c)	73-68-71-67=279	−9	300,000
T6	(United States) Steve Flesch	71-74-68-67=280	−8	242,813
T6	(United States) John Merrick	68-74-72-66=280	−8	242,813
T6	(United States) Steve Stricker	72-69-68-71=280	−8	242,813
T6	(United States) Tiger Woods (c)	70-72-70-68=280	−8	242,813
T10	(United States) Jim Furyk	66-74-68-73=281	−7	187,500
T10	(United States) Hunter Mahan	66-75-71-69=281	−7	187,500
T10	(United States) Sean O'Hair	68-76-68-69=281	−7	187,500

Leaderboard below the top 10
Place	Player	Score	To par	Money ($)
T13	(South Africa) Tim Clark	68-71-72-71=282	−6	150,000
T13	(Colombia) Camilo Villegas	73-69-71-69=282	−6	150,000
T15	(United States) Todd Hamilton	68-70-72-73=283	−5	131,250
T15	(Australia) Geoff Ogilvy	71-70-73-69=283	−5	131,250
T17	(Australia) Aaron Baddeley	68-74-73-69=284	−4	116,250
T17	(Northern Ireland) Graeme McDowell	69-73-73-69=284	−4	116,250
19	(United States) Nick Watney	70-71-71-73=285	−3	105,000
T20	(Canada) Stephen Ames	73-68-71-74=286	−2	71,400
T20	(England) Paul Casey	72-72-73-69=286	−2	71,400
T20	(Japan) Ryuji Imada	73-72-72-69=286	−2	71,400
T20	(South Africa) Trevor Immelman (c)	71-74-72-69=286	−2	71,400
T20	(United States) Anthony Kim	75-65-72-74=286	−2	71,400
T20	(Scotland) Sandy Lyle (c)	72-70-73-71=286	−2	71,400
T20	(Northern Ireland) Rory McIlroy	72-73-71-70=286	−2	71,400
T20	(England) Ian Poulter	71-73-68-74=286	−2	71,400
T20	(England) Justin Rose	74-70-71-71=286	−2	71,400
T20	(South Africa) Rory Sabbatini	73-67-70-76=286	−2	71,400
T30	(Australia) Stuart Appleby	72-73-71-71=287	−1	46,575
T30	(England) Ross Fisher	69-76-73-69=287	−1	46,575
T30	(United States) Dustin Johnson	72-70-72-73=287	−1	46,575
T30	(United States) Larry Mize (c)	67-76-72-72=287	−1	46,575
T30	(Fiji) Vijay Singh (c)	71-70-72-74=287	−1	46,575
T35	(United States) Ben Curtis	73-71-74-70=288	E	38,625
T35	(United States) Ken Duke	71-72-73-72=288	E	38,625
T35	(Republic of Ireland) Pádraig Harrington	69-73-73-73=288	E	38,625
T38	(Australia) Robert Allenby	73-72-72-72=289	+1	33,000
T38	(England) Luke Donald	73-71-72-73=289	+1	33,000
T38	(Spain) Sergio García	73-67-75-74=289	+1	33,000
T38	(Sweden) Henrik Stenson	71-70-75-73=289	+1	33,000
42	(United States) Bubba Watson	72-72-73-73=290	+2	29,250
43	(England) Lee Westwood	70-72-70-79=291	+3	27,250
T44	(United States) Dudley Hart	72-72-73-76=293	+5	25,500
T44	(United States) D. J. Trahan	72-73-72-76=293	+5	25,500
T46	(Spain) Miguel Ángel Jiménez	70-73-78-73=294	+6	21,850
T46	(United States) Kevin Sutherland	69-76-77-72=294	+6	21,850
T46	(Canada) Mike Weir (c)	68-75-79-72=294	+6	21,850
T49	(United States) Rocco Mediate	73-70-78-77=298	+10	19,200
T49	(Argentina) Andrés Romero	69-75-77-77=298	+10	19,200
CUT	(United States) Fred Couples (c)	73-73=146	+2	
CUT	(South Africa) Ernie Els	75-71=146	+2	
CUT	(South Africa) Retief Goosen	75-71=146	+2	
CUT	(Spain) José María Olazábal (c)	71-75=146	+2	
CUT	(Australia) Adam Scott	71-75=146	+2	
CUT	(India) Jeev Milkha Singh	71-75=146	+2	
CUT	(South Africa) Richard Sterne	72-74=146	+2	
CUT	(United States) Stewart Cink	69-78=147	+3	
CUT	(Sweden) Robert Karlsson	73-74=147	+3	
CUT	(Germany) Martin Kaymer	71-76=147	+3	
CUT	(Denmark) Søren Kjeldsen	76-71=147	+3	
CUT	(Australia) Greg Norman	70-77=147	+3	
CUT	(Netherlands) Reinier Saxton (a)	75-72=147	+3	
CUT	(South Korea) Yang Yong-eun	73-74=147	+3	
CUT	(United States) Briny Baird	73-75=148	+4	
CUT	(South Korea) K. J. Choi	76-72=148	+4	
CUT	(Denmark) Søren Hansen	72-76=148	+4	
CUT	(United States) Justin Leonard	75-73=148	+4	
CUT	(United States) Jack Newman (a)	72-76=148	+4	
CUT	(England) Oliver Wilson	73-75=148	+4	
CUT	(United States) Boo Weekley	73-76=149	+5	
CUT	(Wales) Ian Woosnam (c)	74-75=149	+5	
CUT	(Japan) Ryo Ishikawa	73-77=150	+6	
CUT	(United States) Zach Johnson (c)	70-80=150	+6	
CUT	(United States) Drew Kittleson (a)	78-72=150	+6	
CUT	(Germany) Bernhard Langer (c)	70-80=150	+6	
CUT	(South Africa) Louis Oosthuizen	73-77=150	+6	
CUT	(United States) Brandt Snedeker	76-74=150	+6	
CUT	(Australia) Mathew Goggin	74-77=151	+7	
CUT	(Taiwan) Lin Wen-tang	77-74=151	+7	
CUT	(United States) Mark O'Meara (c)	75-76=151	+7	
CUT	(United States) Chez Reavie	75-76=151	+7	
CUT	(United States) Craig Stadler (c)	77-74=151	+7	
CUT	(United States) Billy Mayfair	77-75=152	+8	
CUT	(Spain) Álvaro Quirós	78-75=153	+9	
CUT	(Thailand) Prayad Marksaeng	70-84=154	+10	
CUT	(United States) Pat Perez	75-79=154	+10	
CUT	(Sweden) Carl Pettersson	75-79=154	+10	
CUT	(United States) Steve Wilson (a)	79-75=154	+10	
CUT	(New Zealand) Michael Campbell	80-75=155	+11	
CUT	(New Zealand) Danny Lee (a)	74-81=155	+11	
CUT	(United States) Fuzzy Zoeller (c)	79-76=155	+11	
CUT	(United States) Ben Crenshaw (c)	73-83=156	+12	
CUT	(United States) Tom Watson (c)	74-83=157	+13	
CUT	(United States) Raymond Floyd (c)	79-79=158	+14	
CUT	(South Africa) Gary Player (c)	78-83=161	+17	

==== Scorecard ====
Hole	1	2	3	4	5	6	7	8	9	10	11	12	13	14	15	16	17	18
Par	4	5	4	3	4	3	4	5	4	4	4	3	5	4	5	3	4	4
(Argentina) Cabrera	−11	−11	−12	−11	−10	−10	−10	−10	−10	−9	−9	−9	−10	−10	−11	−12	−12	−12
(United States) Perry	−11	−11	−11	−11	−11	−11	−11	−11	−11	−11	−11	−12	−12	−12	−13	−14	−13	−12
(United States) Campbell	−9	−9	−10	−10	−10	−10	−10	−11	−10	−10	−9	−10	−11	−11	−12	−12	−12	−12
(Japan) Katayama	−6	−7	−7	−7	−6	−6	−7	−7	−7	−7	−7	−7	−8	−8	−8	−9	−9	−10
(United States) Mickelson	−4	−5	−6	−6	−7	−8	−9	−10	−10	−10	−10	−8	−9	−9	−10	−10	−10	−9
(United States) Flesch	−3	−5	−6	−6	−6	−6	−6	−6	−6	−6	−6	−6	−6	−6	−7	−8	−8	−8
(United States) Merrick	−2	−2	−3	−3	−4	−4	−5	−5	−4	−4	−4	−4	−5	−6	−7	−8	−8	−8
(United States) Stricker	−7	−7	−7	−7	−7	−7	−7	−6	−6	−6	−6	−6	−6	−6	−7	−7	−8	−8
(United States) Woods	−4	−5	−5	−5	−5	−5	−5	−7	−7	−7	−7	−7	−8	−8	−9	−10	−9	−8

Cumulative tournament scores, relative to par

Eagle	Birdie	Bogey	Double bogey

=== Playoff ===
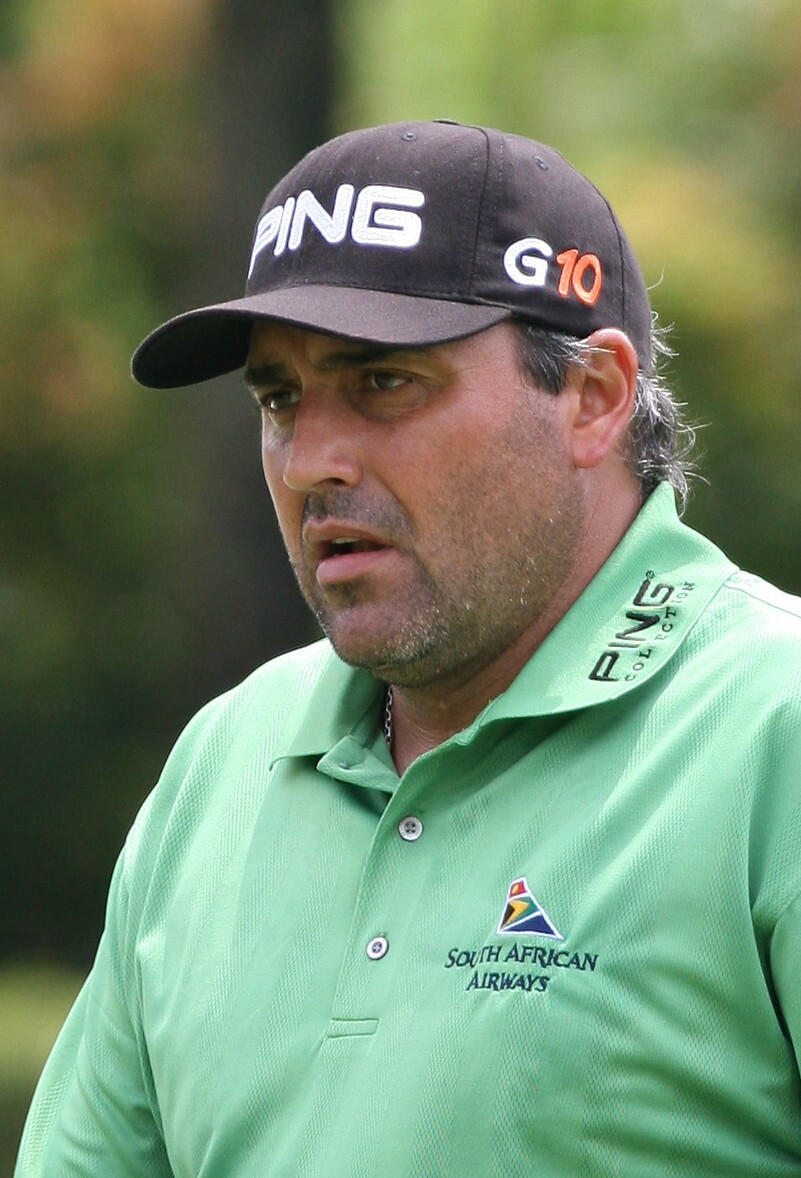
Ángel Cabrera won his first Masters title

The playoff began on the 18th hole and Campbell was eliminated after failing to get up and down from the right greenside bunker. Perry was just off the green to the right, chipped close, and tapped in for par. Cabrera scrambled after an errant tee shot and a recovery shot that ricocheted off a tree, fortuitously into the fairway. His third shot from 114 yards (104 m) ended 6 feet (1.8 m) away and he holed the par putt to extend the playoff. The next hole was the 10th, and Perry failed to get up and down from left of the green; Cabrera two-putted from 15 feet (4.6 m) for par to become the first Argentinian to win the Masters.

Place	Player	Score	To par	Money ($)
1	(Argentina) Ángel Cabrera	4-4	E	1,350,000
T2	(United States) Kenny Perry	4-x	x	660,000
T2	(United States) Chad Campbell	x	x	660,000

== Controversies ==
Rory McIlroy was involved in a controversial incident during the second round. In sixth place on the leaderboard with three holes left to play, McIlroy had double-bogeyed the 16th hole before hitting his approach shot into a bunker on the 18th hole. He failed with his first attempt to get the ball out of the bunker and kicked out at the sand, which could be an offense if it was deemed to be testing the condition of the hazard. He finished his round at 4:15 p.m. local time and at 8:40 p.m. was called to the clubhouse to view footage of the incident. He was later cleared of any wrongdoing, as a player is allowed to smooth over the sand provided that it does nothing to improve the position of the ball with regard to the next shot.

Also during the second round, while putting for birdie on the 15th green, Pádraig Harrington had stepped up to his ball and addressed it, but a gust of wind caused him to step away. The ball then moved, but since he had grounded his club previously, he was deemed to have caused it to move and was penalized one stroke. He sunk the putt and, with the penalty stroke added, scored a par 5 on the hole.
