= John Merrick (golfer) =

American professional golfer (born 1982)

Personal information
- Full name: John Sampson Merrick
- Nationality: United States
- Born: March 20, 1982 (age 44) Long Beach, California, U.S.
- Height: 6 ft 1 in (1.85 m)
- Weight: 170 lb (77 kg; 12 st)
- Spouse: Jody (née Schmidt)
- Children: Chase, Gemma

Career
- Sport: Golf
- College: University of California, Los Angeles
- Turned professional: 2004
- Current tours: PGA Tour (past champion status); Web.com Tour
- Professional wins: 2
- Highest ranking: 73 (February 24, 2013)

Number of wins by tour
- PGA Tour: 1
- Korn Ferry Tour: 1

Best results in major championships
- Masters Tournament: T6: 2009
- PGA Championship: T10: 2009
- U.S. Open: T6: 2008
- The Open Championship: DNP

John Sampson Merrick (born March 20, 1982) is an American professional golfer who plays on the PGA Tour.

== Early life and amateur career ==
Merrick was born and raised in Long Beach, California. He grew up playing Recreation Park municipal golf course, a classic layout by William F. Bell. He attended Wilson Classical High School where he won the Moore League High School Championship. Merrick won the Southern California Golf Association Amateur Championship when he was only 19 years old, making him the youngest person since Tiger Woods in 1994 to capture that title.

In 2003, he medaled at the Pac-10 Men's Golf Championships, leading the UCLA Bruins to their first championship victory since 1985. He shot a course-record 63 at Oakmont Glendale, with three eagles in one round, the only collegiate player to do so that year.

At the 2002 U.S. Amateur at Oakland Hills, he tied for second in stroke play at three-under par 137 (71-66) and advanced to the second round before losing 2&1 to finalist Hunter Mahan.

== Professional career ==
In 2004, Merrick turned professional. He was a member of the Nationwide Tour in 2006. He gained his 2007 PGA Tour card by finishing 21st on the money list in 2006 after his first professional win at the Peek'n Peak Classic. He then went to Q-School and finished tied for fourth. He was the first player to improve his status through Q-School. He consistently ranks among the top players in statistics for total driving (length plus accuracy), greens in regulation, and overall ball-striking.

In his rookie year, Merrick played in 29 events, making 16 cuts. His best finish was T-4 at the Reno-Tahoe Open. After finishing 135th on the money list in 2007, Merrick went back to Q-School where he birdied the last hole to shoot -5 to regain his PGA Tour card for 2008.

On his second full year on tour, Merrick exceeded $1 million in earnings by virtue of 4 top-ten finishes. He got off to a strong start with a T-16 in the Bob Hope Classic (playing as the last alternate into the field) and a career-best T-3 at the Mayakoba Golf Classic at Riviera Maya-Cancun. He was the leader after the third round at the rain-plagued Zurich Classic of New Orleans, finishing T-7. He was medalist at the 2008 U.S. Open sectional qualifying event held at Cordova, Tennessee, shooting 65-65.

At his second career U.S. Open, Merrick finished T-6 at Torrey Pines, a course he played frequently during his junior golf and amateur career. A long birdie putt on Merrick's 72nd hole earned a pass into the 2009 Masters as well as the 2009 U.S. Open. He qualified for the 2008 PGA Championship with the 70th-place ranking in official money standings.

Merrick ended the year 83rd on the money list and retained his card for 2009.

Merrick earned his best result on tour to date at the 2009 Bob Hope Classic, finishing 2nd by three strokes to Pat Perez. He finished T-6 at the Puerto Rico Open in March. A month later, playing in his first Masters, Merrick shot a final round 66 to finish T-6, equaling his best major result to date. Although he missed the cut at the U.S. Open, he rebounded to finish T-10 at the 2009 PGA Championship. Merrick ended the year ranked 58th on the money list. He teamed with Nick Watney in the 2009 Omega Mission Hills World Cup, finishing T7, on the strength of a tournament-record 62 for the final day foursomes.

Despite making 23 cuts including 11 in a row, Merrick finished 2010 at number 140 on the money list. His only top 10 finish was a tie for 3rd at the Reno-Tahoe Open.

Merrick played out of the conditional category (125 to 150 on money list). He Monday-qualified for the Sony Open in Hawaii and the Travelers Championship, where he finished 9th. He finished the year 119th on the money list, and regained his PGA Tour card.

Persevering after a mediocre start to his season, Merrick earned a solo second place at the FedEx St. Jude Classic, one stroke behind winner Dustin Johnson. He finished the year 93rd on the money list, and retained his PGA Tour card.

After 169 starts, Merrick earned his first career PGA Tour win at the Northern Trust Open, beating Charlie Beljan on Riviera's famous 10th hole, the second hole of a sudden-death playoff. The win earned Merrick his third career Masters invitation and his first at a major since the 2010 PGA Championship. Merrick became the first native of Los Angeles County to win the event. His victory earned him a two-year exemption on the PGA Tour (through the 2015 season) and put him in the top-100 in the Official World Golf Ranking, moving from 241st to 74th.

After finishing 162nd in the FedEx Cup during the 2015 season and failing to regain his PGA Tour card through the Web.com Tour Finals, Merrick balanced his season between the PGA Tour (past champion status) and Web.com Tour (category 6, 51st-75th on Finals money list).

== Personal life ==
Merrick graduated from the University of California, Los Angeles in 2004 with a degree in Sociology. He resides in Long Beach, California. He is married to the former Jody Schmidt, who was a member of UCLA's 2003 national championship water polo team, and has two children.

Merrick is now a member of Virginia Country Club in Long Beach, along with fellow golf professionals John Mallinger, Patrick Cantlay, and Peter Tomasulo.

== Amateur wins ==
- 2001 Long Beach City Amateur, Southern California Golf Association Amateur
- 2002 Long Beach City Amateur
- 2003 Pac-10 Men's Golf Championship (individual)

== Professional wins (2) ==
=== PGA Tour wins (1) ===
No.	Date	Tournament	Winning score	Margin of victory	Runner-up
1	Feb 17, 2013	Northern Trust Open	−11 (68-66-70-69=273)	Playoff	(United States) Charlie Beljan

PGA Tour playoff record (1–0)

No.	Year	Tournament	Opponent	Result
1	2013	Northern Trust Open	(United States) Charlie Beljan	Won with par on second extra hole

=== Nationwide Tour wins (1) ===
No.	Date	Tournament	Winning score	Margin of victory	Runner-up
1	Jul 2, 2006	Peek'n Peak Classic	−11 (71-69-69-68=277)	Playoff	(Australia) Gavin Coles

Nationwide Tour playoff record (1–0)

No.	Year	Tournament	Opponent	Result
1	2006	Peek'n Peak Classic	(Australia) Gavin Coles	Won with par on third extra hole

== Results in major championships ==
Tournament	2005	2006	2007	2008	2009	2010	2011	2012	2013
Masters Tournament					T6	CUT			CUT
U.S. Open	CUT			T6	CUT				
The Open Championship									
PGA Championship				T52	T10	CUT			T47

Top 10
Did not play

CUT = missed the half way cut
"T" indicates a tie for a place.

=== Summary ===
Tournament	Wins	2nd	3rd	Top-5	Top-10	Top-25	Events	Cuts made
Masters Tournament	0	0	0	0	1	1	3	1
U.S. Open	0	0	0	0	1	1	3	1
The Open Championship	0	0	0	0	0	0	0	0
PGA Championship	0	0	0	0	1	1	4	3
Totals	0	0	0	0	3	3	10	5

- Most consecutive cuts made – 3 (2008 U.S. Open – 2009 Masters)
- Longest streak of top-10s – 1 (three times)

== Results in The Players Championship ==
Tournament	2008	2009	2010	2011	2012	2013	2014
The Players Championship	T27	T66	T47		CUT	CUT	T75

Did not play

CUT = missed the halfway cut
"T" indicates a tie for a place

== Results in World Golf Championships ==
Tournament	2013
Match Play	
Championship	T60
Invitational	T19
Champions	T55

Did not play

"T" = Tied

== U.S. national team appearances ==
- World Cup: 2009

== See also ==
- 2006 Nationwide Tour graduates
- 2006 PGA Tour Qualifying School graduates
- 2007 PGA Tour Qualifying School graduates
