= Chad Campbell =

American professional golfer (born 1974)

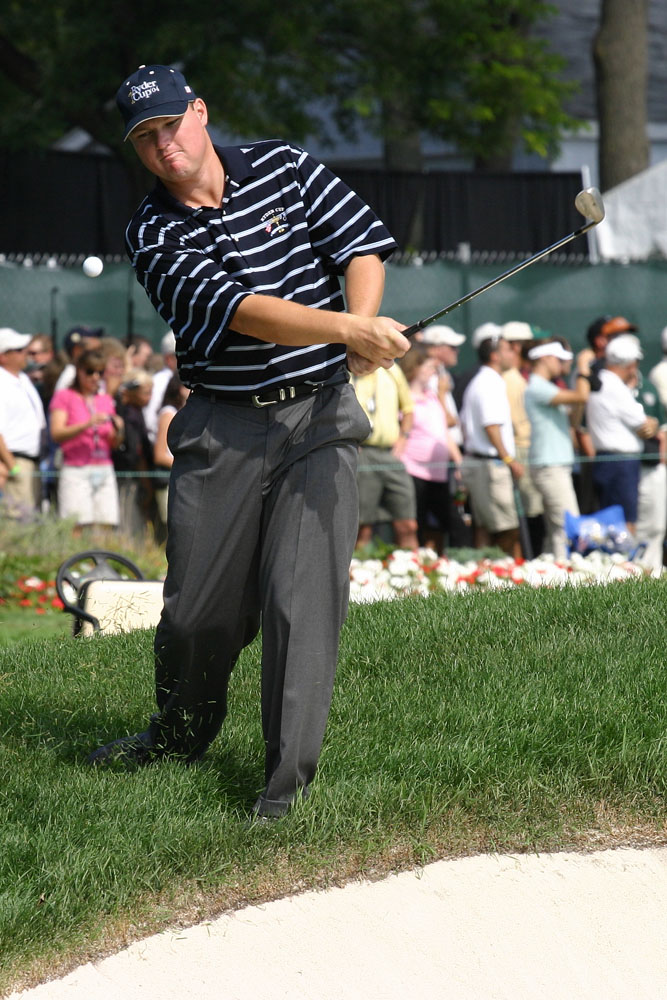

Personal information
- Full name: David Chad Campbell
- Nationality: United States
- Born: May 31, 1974 (age 52) Andrews, Texas, U.S.
- Height: 6 ft 1 in (1.85 m)
- Weight: 205 lb (93 kg; 14.6 st)

Career
- Sport: Golf
- College: Midland College; University of Nevada, Las Vegas
- Turned professional: 1996
- Current tour: PGA Tour
- Former tour: Buy.com Tour
- Professional wins: 20
- Highest ranking: 9 (May 23, 2004)

Number of wins by tour
- PGA Tour: 4
- Korn Ferry Tour: 3
- Other: 13

Best results in major championships
- Masters Tournament: T2: 2009
- PGA Championship: 2nd: 2003
- U.S. Open: T18: 2008
- The Open Championship: T5: 2011

Achievements and awards
- Buy.com Tour money list winner: 2001
- Buy.com Tour Player of the Year: 2001

David Chad Campbell (born May 31, 1974) is an American professional golfer who plays on the PGA Tour, where he has won four times. He also notably finished as a runner-up at the 2009 Masters, after losing in a sudden-death playoff.

== Early life and amateur career ==
Campbell was born in Andrews, Texas and grew up in west Texas. He was a member of a strong junior college men's golf squad during the years (1992–94) he played at Midland College. He was the conference medalist in 1993, the year that the MC team dominated the Western Junior College Athletic Conference (WJCAC) and won the regional title. In 1994, the Chaps repeated as WJCAC champions and finished second in the National Junior College Athletic Association (NJCAA) championship. That year, Campbell was WJCAC medalist, Region V Tournament medalist and the NJCAA Tournament medalist runner-up. In 1994, he was named an NJCAA All-American. He was listed as the number one player in the final NJCAA national poll. After two years at MC, he won a scholarship and transferred to the University of Nevada-Las Vegas (UNLV). He turned professional in 1996.

== Professional career ==
Prior to 2000, Campbell played on the third-tier NGA Hooters Tour, where he won 13 tournaments and was the leading money winner three times. Campbell left the tour as the career leader in wins and earnings. In 2001, he played on the second-tier Buy.com Tour, now known as the Korn Ferry Tour, where he earned a "battlefield promotion," winning three tournaments to earn promotion to the elite PGA Tour part way through the season.

In 2003, Campbell won The Tour Championship, was runner-up to surprise winner Shaun Micheel at the PGA Championship, and finished seventh on the PGA Tour money list. He claimed a second PGA Tour win in 2004 and made a strong start to 2006, winning the Bob Hope Chrysler Classic and topping the money list for a short time early in the season. He won his fourth PGA Tour title by one stroke at the 2007 Viking Classic.

Campbell finished as a runner-up at the 2009 Masters, after losing in a three man sudden-death playoff, involving Ángel Cabrera and Kenny Perry. The three players had finished regulation play at 12-under par. At the first extra hole, Campbell hit his second shot from the middle of the fairway but found the greenside bunker. He played out of the bunker to four feet past the hole, but missed the par putt and was eliminated, as both Cabrera and Perry made pars. Earlier in the week, Campbell had made the best start to a Masters Tournament, after making five birdies in the first five holes.

Campbell featured in the top 10 of the Official World Golf Ranking briefly in 2004.

Campbell played the 2013–14 season with conditional status, but failed to graduate from the Web.com Tour finals. He used a career money list exemption for 2014–15 and retained exempt status the following year.

== Professional wins (20) ==
=== PGA Tour wins (4) ===
Legend
Tour Championships (1)
Other PGA Tour (3)

No.	Date	Tournament	Winning score	Margin of victory	Runner(s)-up
1	Nov 9, 2003	The Tour Championship	−16 (70-69-61-68=268)	3 strokes	(United States) Charles Howell III
2	Mar 21, 2004	Bay Hill Invitational	−18 (66-68-70-66=270)	6 strokes	(Australia) Stuart Appleby
3	Jan 22, 2006	Bob Hope Chrysler Classic	−25 (63-66-68-67-71=335)	3 strokes	(Sweden) Jesper Parnevik, (United States) Scott Verplank
4	Sep 30, 2007	Viking Classic	−13 (70-72-64-69=275)	1 stroke	(United States) Johnson Wagner

PGA Tour playoff record (0–2)

No.	Year	Tournament	Opponents	Result
1	2009	Masters Tournament	(Argentina) Ángel Cabrera, (United States) Kenny Perry	Cabrera won with par on second extra hole Campbell eliminated by par on first hole
2	2009	Justin Timberlake Shriners Hospitals for Children Open	(Scotland) Martin Laird, (United States) George McNeill	Laird won with birdie on third extra hole Campbell eliminated by par on second hole

=== Buy.com Tour wins (3) ===
No.	Date	Tournament	Winning score	Margin of victory	Runner-up
1	May 20, 2001	Buy.com Richmond Open	−21 (67-67-64-65=263)	3 strokes	(United States) Kelly Gibson
2	Sep 19, 2001	Buy.com Permian Basin Open	−24 (64-68-63-69=264)	4 strokes	(United States) Todd Fischer
3	Oct 7, 2001	Buy.com Monterey Peninsula Classic	−8 (69-72-70-69=280)	1 stroke	(South Africa) Deane Pappas

=== NGA Hooters Tour wins (13) ===
No.	Date	Tournament	Winning score	Margin of victory	Runner(s)-up
1	Jun 15, 1997	KFVS12 Classic	−19 (66-67-67-69=269)	1 stroke	(United States) Eric Meichtry
2	Jun 21, 1998	Pioneer Electric/Touchstone Energy Camellia City Classic	−20 (66-69-65-68=268)	11 strokes	(United States) Michael Foster, (United States) Brent Winston
3	Aug 16, 1998	Jackaroo Steakhouse and Sauce Classic	−17 (67-69-67-68=271)	3 strokes	(United States) Darron Stiles
4	Feb 21, 1999	Hooters Classic 1	−10 (68-72-66-72=278)	1 stroke	(United States) Chris Winchip
5	May 30, 1999	Hooters Classic 6	−21 (64-65-68-70=267)	3 strokes	(United States) Mark Wilson
6	Mar 5, 2000	Hooters Classic 1	−18 (69-68-67-66=270)	6 strokes	(United States) Tim Straub
7	Apr 2, 2000	Hooters Classic 2	−23 (64-65-65-67=261)	7 strokes	(United States) Scott Hebert
8	Apr 9, 2000	Hooters Classic 3	−9 (71-65-69-66=271)	9 strokes	(United States) Kyle Owen, (United States) Vaughn Taylor
9	Apr 16, 2000	Michelob Light Classic 1	−10 (74-70-69-65=278)	Playoff	(United States) Jeremy Parrott
10	May 7, 2000	Hooters Classic 4	−16 (66-67-68-71=272)	1 stroke	(United States) Matthew Russell
11	Jun 25, 2000	Hooters Classic 6	−21 (68-66-68-65=267)	Playoff	(United States) Eric Epperson
12	Jul 23, 2000	Michelob Light Classic 2	−21 (68-69-64-66=267)	3 strokes	(United States) Scott Hebert
13	Aug 13, 2000	Hooters Classic 7	−10 (71-71-67-69=278)	3 strokes	(United States) Todd Bailey, (United States) Christopher Berry, (United States) Shane Supple

== Playoff record ==
Other playoff record (0–2)

No.	Year	Tournament	Opponent(s)	Result
1	2003	Franklin Templeton Shootout (with (United States) Shaun Micheel)	(United States) Brad Faxon and (United States) Scott McCarron, (United States) Hank Kuehne and (United States) Jeff Sluman	Kuehne/Sluman won with birdie on second extra hole
2	2005	Nissan Open	(Australia) Adam Scott	Lost to par on first extra hole

== Results in major championships ==
Tournament	1999	2000	2001	2002	2003	2004	2005	2006	2007	2008	2009
Masters Tournament					CUT	CUT	T17	T3	CUT		T2
U.S. Open	CUT	CUT	CUT		T35	CUT	T42	CUT	57	T18	CUT
The Open Championship					T15	CUT	CUT	65	CUT		CUT
PGA Championship				CUT	2	T24	T28	T24	T57	CUT	T43

Tournament	2010	2011	2012
Masters Tournament	T45		
U.S. Open		CUT	
The Open Championship		T5	T72
PGA Championship	T62		

Top 10
Did not play

CUT = missed the half-way cut
"T" = tied for place

=== Summary ===
Tournament	Wins	2nd	3rd	Top-5	Top-10	Top-25	Events	Cuts made
Masters Tournament	0	1	1	2	2	3	7	4
U.S. Open	0	0	0	0	0	1	11	4
The Open Championship	0	0	0	1	1	2	8	4
PGA Championship	0	1	0	1	1	3	9	7
Totals	0	2	1	4	4	9	35	19

- Most consecutive cuts made – 3 (three times)
- Longest streak of top-10s – 1 (four times)

== Results in The Players Championship ==
Tournament	2003	2004	2005	2006	2007	2008	2009	2010	2011	2012	2013	2014	2015	2016	2017	2018
The Players Championship	T6	T42	CUT	T70	CUT	T10	CUT	CUT	T26	CUT	T43			T39	CUT	CUT

Top 10
Did not play

CUT = missed the halfway cut
"T" indicates a tie for a place

== Results in World Golf Championships ==
Tournament	2003	2004	2005	2006	2007	2008	2009	2010
Match Play		R16	R16	QF	4			R64
Championship	T59	T50	T15	T32	T35		T53	
Invitational	T53	T69	T33	T50	T77	T14	T11	T46
Champions								

Top 10
Did not play

QF, R16, R32, R64 = Round in which player lost in match play
"T" = tied
Note that the HSBC Champions did not become a WGC event until 2009.

== PGA Tour career summary ==
Season	Wins	Earnings ($)	Rank
1996	0	2,050	n/a
1998	0	5,783	321
1999	0	12,917	281
2001	0	653,752	n/a
2002	0	825,474	81
2003	1	3,912,064	7
2004	1	2,264,985	24
2005	0	2,391,432	20
2006	1	2,811,067	14
2007	1	1,701,242	49
2008	0	2,404,770	24
2009	0	1,725,237	48
2010	0	971,154	96
2011	0	1,104,024	83
2012	0	895,199	106
2013	0	510,661	135
2014	0	470,798	149
2015	0	1,015,707	100
2016	0	1,168,073	91
2017	0	1,329,941	80
2018	0	801,960	127
2019	0	42,130	237
2020	0	196,875	191
Career*	4	26,817,362	52

* Complete through the 2020 season.

== U.S. national team appearances ==
Professional

- Ryder Cup: 2004, 2006, 2008 (winners)

== See also ==
- 2001 Buy.com Tour graduates
