= Kenny Perry =

American professional golfer (born 1960)

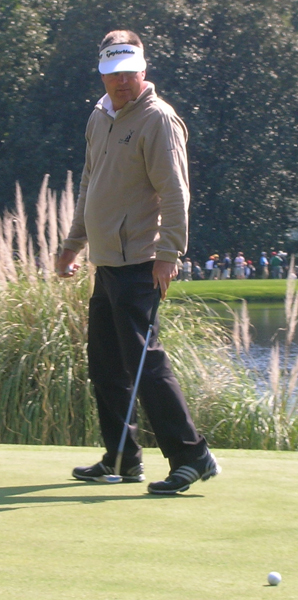
- Perry in 2009

Personal information
- Full name: James Kenneth Perry
- Nationality: United States
- Born: August 10, 1960 (age 66) Elizabethtown, Kentucky, U.S.
- Height: 6 ft 2 in (1.88 m)
- Weight: 205 lb (93 kg; 14.6 st)
- Spouse: Sandy Perry
- Children: 3

Career
- Sport: Golf
- College: Western Kentucky University
- Turned professional: 1982
- Current tour: PGA Tour Champions
- Former tour: PGA Tour
- Professional wins: 27
- Highest ranking: 4 (June 28, 2009)

Number of wins by tour
- PGA Tour: 14
- PGA Tour Champions: 10
- Other: 3

Best results in major championships
- Masters Tournament: T2: 2009
- PGA Championship: 2nd: 1996
- U.S. Open: T3: 2003
- The Open Championship: T8: 2003

Achievements and awards
- Payne Stewart Award: 2009
- Champions Tour Rookie of the Year: 2011
- Champions Tour Charles Schwab Cup winner: 2013
- Champions Tour Player of the Year: 2013

James Kenneth Perry (born August 10, 1960) is an American professional golfer who currently plays on the PGA Tour Champions. He won 14 PGA Tour events and has won nine PGA Tour Champions events including four senior major championships: the 2013 Constellation Senior Players Championship, the 2013 U.S. Senior Open, the 2014 Regions Tradition, and the 2017 U.S. Senior Open.

== Early life and amateur career ==
Perry was born in Elizabethtown, Kentucky to Ken and Mildred Perry, and raised in Franklin, Kentucky. He was introduced to the game of golf by his father at the age of seven. He started his high school golf career at Franklin-Simpson High School. Shortly thereafter, his father accepted a job opportunity in McCracken County a few miles outside Paducah, Kentucky. Kenny attended high school and played on the golf team at McCracken County's Lone Oak High School, near Paducah. After graduating from Lone Oak, he attended Western Kentucky University in Bowling Green.

== Professional career ==
Perry turned professional in 1982. He failed in his first two attempts to qualify for the PGA Tour at Q-school. He missed by 1 stroke one year and received word that his wife had gone into labor during the fourth round the next year. He had been sponsored by a group of about twenty individuals, many local citizens from Franklin, in his early play on the mini-tours and his first two attempts at Q-school.

In 1985, a Franklin businessman and David Lipscomb University (now simply Lipscomb University) graduate lent him $5000 for a last shot at Q-school. Rather than repay the loan, he was asked to give a percentage of his tour earnings to Lipscomb if he qualified. He tied for 40th at Q-school, earning his card with a two-shot cushion. Perry and his benefactor agreed on 5 percent, and he has maintained that commitment to Lipscomb ever since in the form of a scholarship for residents of Simpson County, Kentucky.

In Perry's first few seasons, he struggled to retain his qualification status. He made his first big (for the time) check on the PGA Tour ($55,000) with a T-4 finish at the Panasonic Las Vegas Invitational in May 1987. Shortly after that tournament, Perry repaid all of the money put up by all of his original sponsors, even though he had no legal obligation to do so. Perry got his first win in 1991 at the Memorial Tournament. Two more wins followed in the mid-1990s, another in 2001, and three victories in 2003.

In 1996, Perry was in contention at the PGA Championship held at Valhalla in his native Kentucky. He had a one shot lead on the last hole but took a bogey and proceeded to be beaten in the playoff by Mark Brooks. Perry played in the 2004 Ryder Cup at Oakland Hills Country Club in Bloomfield Township, Michigan. On the first day, Perry played in an afternoon foursome with Stewart Cink and they lost to Sergio García and Luke Donald (2 & 1). On the third day, Perry played in a singles match and lost to Lee Westwood (1 up). Team Europe defeated Team USA 18½ to 9½. In 2005, Perry won at the Bay Hill Invitational and the Bank of America Colonial. The following year, he became the 10th man to reach $20 million in PGA Tour career earnings in addition to taking an 8-week break from the tour to recover from knee surgery. He was in the top-10 of the Official World Golf Ranking for over 100 weeks from 2003 to 2005 and 2009 to 2010.

After returning from arthroscopic knee surgery in early 2006, Perry struggled to find the previous form he had from 2003 to 2005. However, in 2008, he had a steady start making 10 cuts in his first 11 tournaments, and beginning in the middle of May he had six top ten finishes in eight starts, including three victories in the Memorial Tournament, the Buick Open, and the John Deere Classic (in which he beat Jay Williamson and Brad Adamonis in a playoff). He received some criticism for skipping major championships in 2008 in order to concentrate on qualifying for the Ryder Cup team. He was eager to make the team as the event was being held in his native Kentucky, and he helped the USA win the cup for the first time since 1999.

Perry played in the 2008 Ryder Cup at the Valhalla Golf Club in Louisville, Kentucky. On the first day, Perry played a morning foursome with Jim Furyk and they halved the match with Sergio García and Lee Westwood. On the second day, Perry played a morning foursome with Furyk and they defeated Pádraig Harrington and Robert Karlsson (3 & 1). Also on day two, Perry played an afternoon fourball with Furyk and they lost to Ian Poulter and Graeme McDowell (1 up). On the third day, Perry played in a singles match and defeated Henrik Stenson (3 & 2). Team USA defeated Team Europe 16½ to 11½.

Despite rumors that he would retire following Team USA's Ryder Cup victory, Perry confirmed at the start of the 2009 PGA Tour season that he hoped to win at least eight more tournaments, which would take his career total to 20. Twenty wins ensures a lifetime PGA Tour membership.

Perry won his first event in 2009 in his third start at the FBR Open, where he defeated Charley Hoffman on the third playoff hole with a birdie. It was his 13th career tour win. He maintained a rich vein of form throughout the first few months of the 2009 season, making ten cuts in ten events and registering five top-10 finishes during this streak.

In April 2009, Perry was the 54-hole co-leader at The Masters and held the lead by two strokes with two holes to go. However, he recorded two straight bogeys, after failing to find the green in regulation at both the 17th and 18th holes. This resulted in a sudden-death playoff with Ángel Cabrera and Chad Campbell. Perry made par on the first extra hole, to match Cabrera, but Campbell was eliminated after he made bogey. At the second extra hole, Perry missed the green from the middle of the fairway and then ran his pitch well past the hole, resulting in a bogey. Cabrera then won the playoff and the tournament with a par. Perry would have become the oldest winner of The Masters at 48 years old, 8 months, and 2 days. He received over 700 letters and emails in the aftermath of his playoff defeat, including a note from former president George W. Bush.

Perry won his second event of 2009 at the Travelers Championship in June, coming from one stroke behind Paul Goydos. Perry shot a final round 63 and won his 14th tour event, one win closer to his goal of 20 career wins. He won the event by three strokes over Goydos and fellow American David Toms. With the win he moved into a career high spot of four at the Official World Golf Ranking. Perry is among the winningest and highest all-time PGA Tour money winners without a major championship, with fourteen wins and career earnings of over $32 million. His best major finishes are playoff losses at the 1996 PGA Championship and 2009 Masters Tournament. For his success in leading the US to victory in the Ryder Cup, he and fellow Kentuckian J. B. Holmes were named Kentuckians of the Year for 2008 by Kentucky Monthly magazine. He is good friends with Vijay Singh who calls him "Biggie".

Perry began playing on the Champions Tour after turning 50 in August 2010 while continuing to play on the PGA Tour. He won his first event in October 2011 at the SAS Championship. He nearly withdrew from the event after learning of his sister's death. In 2011, Perry split his time between the PGA Tour and the Champions Tour. He finished 15th on the Champions Tour money list playing in ten events. Although his focus was on the Champions Tour, he also had status on the PGA Tour until 2014 due to multiple wins in 2008 and 2009.

Perry won for the second time on the Champions Tour early in 2012 at the ACE Group Classic. He shot rounds of 64 and 62 on the first two days to break the 36 hole scoring record on the Champions Tour and after ending with a 2 under par round of 70, he tied the overall tournament scoring record at 20 under par.

Perry was given a special invitation from the PGA of America to compete in the 2014 PGA Championship, held in his home state of Kentucky and site of his 1996 playoff loss; he finished T27.

In 2015, he used a one-time exemption for being the top 25 of the career money list. He said he intended to play 18 events on the PGA Tour and only about seven on the Champions Tour, mainly the major tournaments.

== Personal life ==
Perry is married to Sandy. He has three children: Lesslye, Justin, and Lindsey. Justin played on Western Kentucky University's golf team and has also caddied for his father on several occasions.

His mother, Mildred, died on October 1, 2009, at the age of 79 at her home in Franklin while under Hospice care after a long battle with multiple myeloma. Perry is a member and deacon of Franklin Church of Christ in Franklin, Kentucky.

Perry also owns a golf course near his residence in Franklin by the name of Kenny Perry's Country Creek Golf Course. It is a full 18-hole course that was built in 1995.

== Awards and honors ==
- In 1993, Perry was inducted into the Kentucky Golf Hall of Fame.
- In 1994, he was inducted in the Western Kentucky University Hall of Fame.
- Perry was named the winner of the 2002 Charles Bartlett Award, given to a professional golfer for his unselfish contributions to the betterment of society, by the Golf Writers Association of America.
- In 2007, Perry was inducted into the Western Kentucky University Hall of Distinguished Alumni.
- On October 14, 2008, Perry was inducted into Lipscomb University's Athletics Hall of Fame.
- In 2009, Perry won the Payne Stewart Award.
- On November 3, 2013, Perry clinched the 2013 Charles Schwab Cup. He was also named 2013 Champions Tour Player of the Year.

== Professional wins (27) ==
=== PGA Tour wins (14) ===
No.	Date	Tournament	Winning score	Margin of victory	Runner(s)-up
1	May 19, 1991	Memorial Tournament	−15 (70-63-69-71=273)	Playoff	(United States) Hale Irwin
2	Jul 24, 1994	New England Classic	−16 (67-66-70-65=268)	1 stroke	(Northern Ireland) David Feherty
3	Feb 19, 1995	Bob Hope Chrysler Classic	−25 (63-71-64-67-70=335)	1 stroke	(United States) David Duval
4	Aug 12, 2001	Buick Open	−25 (66-64-64-69=263)	2 strokes	(United States) Chris DiMarco, (United States) Jim Furyk
5	May 25, 2003	Bank of America Colonial	−19 (68-64-61-68=261)	6 strokes	(United States) Justin Leonard
6	Jun 1, 2003	Memorial Tournament (2)	−13 (65-68-70-72=275)	2 strokes	(United States) Lee Janzen
7	Jul 13, 2003	Greater Milwaukee Open	−12 (69-67-66-66=268)	1 stroke	(Australia) Stephen Allan, (United States) Heath Slocum
8	Mar 20, 2005	Bay Hill Invitational	−12 (70-68-68-70=276)	2 strokes	(Northern Ireland) Graeme McDowell, (Fiji) Vijay Singh
9	May 22, 2005	Bank of America Colonial (2)	−19 (65-63-64-69=261)	7 strokes	(United States) Billy Mayfair
10	Jun 1, 2008	Memorial Tournament (3)	−8 (66-71-74-69=280)	2 strokes	(Australia) Mathew Goggin, (United States) Jerry Kelly, (England) Justin Rose, (Canada) Mike Weir
11	Jun 29, 2008	Buick Open (2)	−19 (69-67-67-66=269)	1 stroke	(United States) Woody Austin, (United States) Bubba Watson
12	Jul 13, 2008	John Deere Classic	−16 (65-66-67-70=268)	Playoff	(United States) Brad Adamonis, (United States) Jay Williamson
13	Feb 1, 2009	FBR Open	−14 (72-63-66-69=270)	Playoff	(United States) Charley Hoffman
14	Jun 28, 2009	Travelers Championship	−22 (61-68-66-63=258)	3 strokes	(United States) Paul Goydos, (United States) David Toms

PGA Tour playoff record (3–3)

No.	Year	Tournament	Opponent(s)	Result
1	1991	Memorial Tournament	(United States) Hale Irwin	Won with birdie on first extra hole
2	1996	PGA Championship	(United States) Mark Brooks	Lost to birdie on first extra hole
3	2008	AT&T Classic	(Japan) Ryuji Imada	Lost to par on first extra hole
4	2008	John Deere Classic	(United States) Brad Adamonis, (United States) Jay Williamson	Won with par on first extra hole
5	2009	FBR Open	(United States) Charley Hoffman	Won with birdie on third extra hole
6	2009	Masters Tournament	(Argentina) Ángel Cabrera, (United States) Chad Campbell	Cabrera won with par on second extra hole Campbell eliminated by par on first hole

=== Other wins (3) ===
No.	Date	Tournament	Winning score	Margin of victory	Runners-up
1	Nov 13, 2005	Franklin Templeton Shootout (with (United States) John Huston)	−30 (64-63-59=186)	1 stroke	(United States) Fred Couples and (Australia) Adam Scott
2	Dec 14, 2008	Merrill Lynch Shootout (2) (with (United States) Scott Hoch)	−31 (65-60-60=185)	4 strokes	(United States) J. B. Holmes and (United States) Boo Weekley
3	Dec 9, 2012	Franklin Templeton Shootout (3) (with (United States) Sean O'Hair)	−31 (64-61-60=185)	1 stroke	(United States) Charles Howell III and (South Africa) Rory Sabbatini

=== PGA Tour Champions wins (10) ===
Legend
PGA Tour Champions major championships (4)
Other PGA Tour Champions (6)

No.	Date	Tournament	Winning score	Margin of victory	Runner(s)-up
1	Oct 2, 2011	SAS Championship	−11 (66-69-70=205)	1 stroke	(United States) John Huston, (United States) Jeff Sluman
2	Feb 19, 2012	ACE Group Classic	−20 (64-62-70=196)	5 strokes	(Germany) Bernhard Langer
3	Jun 30, 2013	Constellation Senior Players Championship	−19 (71-63-63-64=261)	2 strokes	(United States) Fred Couples, (United States) Duffy Waldorf
4	Jul 14, 2013	U.S. Senior Open	−13 (67-73-64-63=267)	5 strokes	(United States) Fred Funk
5	Oct 27, 2013	AT&T Championship	−13 (65-71-67=203)	Playoff	(Germany) Bernhard Langer
6	May 18, 2014	Regions Tradition	−7 (72-68-69-72=281)	1 stroke	(United States) Mark Calcavecchia
7	Aug 3, 2014	3M Championship	−23 (65-63-65=193)	1 stroke	(Germany) Bernhard Langer
8	Aug 2, 2015	3M Championship (2)	−18 (69-61-68=198)	4 strokes	(United States) Scott Dunlap, (Germany) Bernhard Langer, (United States) Kevin Sutherland
9	Jul 2, 2017	U.S. Senior Open (2)	−16 (65-64-67-68=264)	2 strokes	(United States) Kirk Triplett
10	Aug 5, 2018	3M Championship (3)	−21 (66-60-69=195)	3 strokes	(United States) Wes Short Jr.

PGA Tour Champions playoff record (1–4)

No.	Year	Tournament	Opponent(s)	Result
1	2011	Liberty Mutual Legends of Golf (with (United States) Scott Hoch)	(United States) David Eger and (Republic of Ireland) Mark McNulty	Lost to par on second extra hole
2	2013	Montreal Championship	(Mexico) Esteban Toledo	Lost to birdie on third extra hole
3	2013	AT&T Championship	(Germany) Bernhard Langer	Won with birdie on first extra hole
4	2015	Insperity Invitational	(United States) Tom Lehman, (Wales) Ian Woosnam	Woosnam won with birdie on first extra hole
5	2020	Charles Schwab Series at Bass Pro Shops Big Cedar Lodge	(United States) Shane Bertsch, (United States) Glen Day, (Germany) Bernhard Langer	Bertsch won with eagle on first extra hole

== Results in major championships ==
Tournament	1988	1989
Masters Tournament		
U.S. Open	T54	
The Open Championship		
PGA Championship		T51

Tournament	1990	1991	1992	1993	1994	1995	1996	1997	1998	1999
Masters Tournament			CUT			T12	CUT	CUT		
U.S. Open				T25		CUT	T50	CUT		
The Open Championship		CUT								
PGA Championship	T49	77			T55	T49	2	T23	T10	T34

Tournament	2000	2001	2002	2003	2004	2005	2006	2007	2008	2009
Masters Tournament			CUT	T39	CUT	T29				T2
U.S. Open			T45	T3	CUT	T23	58			44
The Open Championship				T8	T16	T11	CUT			T52
PGA Championship	T30	T44	T29	T10	CUT	T23	T49	T23	WD	T43

Tournament	2010	2011	2012	2013	2014	2015	2016	2017	2018
Masters Tournament	T26								
U.S. Open	T33				T28				CUT
The Open Championship	CUT								
PGA Championship	CUT				T27				

Top 10
Did not play

CUT = missed the half-way cut
"T" = tied
WD = Withdrew

=== Summary ===
Tournament	Wins	2nd	3rd	Top-5	Top-10	Top-25	Events	Cuts made
Masters Tournament	0	1	0	1	1	2	10	5
U.S. Open	0	0	1	1	1	3	14	10
The Open Championship	0	0	0	0	1	3	7	4
PGA Championship	0	1	0	1	3	6	21	18
Totals	0	2	1	3	6	14	52	37

- Most consecutive cuts made – 6 (twice)
- Longest streak of top-10s – 3 (2003 U.S. Open – 2003 PGA)

== Results in The Players Championship ==
Tournament	1988	1989
The Players Championship	33	T21

Tournament	1990	1991	1992	1993	1994	1995	1996	1997	1998	1999
The Players Championship	T56	T57	WD	T65	T62	T55	T4	CUT	CUT	WD

Tournament	2000	2001	2002	2003	2004	2005	2006	2007	2008	2009
The Players Championship	T27	T18	T60	T32	T3	CUT		T58	T15	T22

Tournament	2010	2011	2012	2013	2014
The Players Championship	T22	T39			CUT

Top 10
Did not play

CUT = missed the halfway cut
WD = withdrew
"T" indicates a tie for a place

== Results in World Golf Championships ==
Tournament	2001	2002	2003	2004	2005	2006	2007	2008	2009	2010
Match Play	R64	R64	R64	R16	R32	R64			R64	R64
Championship	NT^{1}	22	T28		T32				T9	T45
Invitational		T24	T53	T27	T6	T27	T11	T66	T11	T19
Champions										

^{1}Cancelled due to 9/11

Top 10
Did not play

QF, R16, R32, R64 = Round in which player lost in match play
"T" = Tied
NT = No tournament
Note that the HSBC Champions did not become a WGC event until 2009.

== Senior major championships ==
=== Wins (4) ===
Year	Championship	54 holes	Winning score	Margin	Runner(s)-up
2013	Constellation Senior Players Championship	2 shot deficit	−19 (71-63-63-64=261)	2 strokes	(United States) Fred Couples, (United States) Duffy Waldorf
2013	U.S. Senior Open	2 shot deficit	−13 (67-73-64-63=267)	5 strokes	(United States) Fred Funk
2014	Regions Tradition	1 shot lead	−7 (72-68-69-72=281)	1 stroke	(United States) Mark Calcavecchia
2017	U.S. Senior Open (2)	1 shot deficit	−16 (65-64-67-68=264)	2 strokes	(United States) Kirk Triplett

=== Results timeline ===
Results not in chronological order.

Tournament	2011	2012	2013	2014	2015	2016	2017	2018	2019	2020	2021	2022	2023	2024	2025	2026
Senior PGA Championship	T22	9	T2	T13		T22	T33	T38		NT	T16		T45	T11		T56
The Tradition	T5	T13	T15	1	T5	T23	T20	T13	WD	NT	T56		T28	T8	T42	T39
U.S. Senior Open		CUT	1	T14	T12	WD	1	T40	WD	NT	CUT		T60	70		
Senior Players Championship	T13	T8	1	4	T34	T13	T26	T6	T7	T19	T49		T23	6	T25	T28
Senior British Open Championship								T32		NT						

Win
Top 10
Did not play

CUT = missed the halfway cut
WD = withdrew
"T" indicates a tie for a place
NT = no tournament due to COVID-19 pandemic

== U.S. national team appearances ==
Professional

- Presidents Cup: 1996 (winners), 2003 (tie), 2005 (winners), 2009 (winners)
- Ryder Cup: 2004, 2008 (winners)
- Wendy's 3-Tour Challenge (representing Champions Tour): 2008 (PGA Tour), 2010, 2011 (winners), 2013

== See also ==
- 1986 PGA Tour Qualifying School graduates
- List of golfers with most PGA Tour Champions wins
