= Jim Furyk's round of 58 =

Golf round on August 7, 2016

Jim Furyk's round of 58 at the Travelers Championship
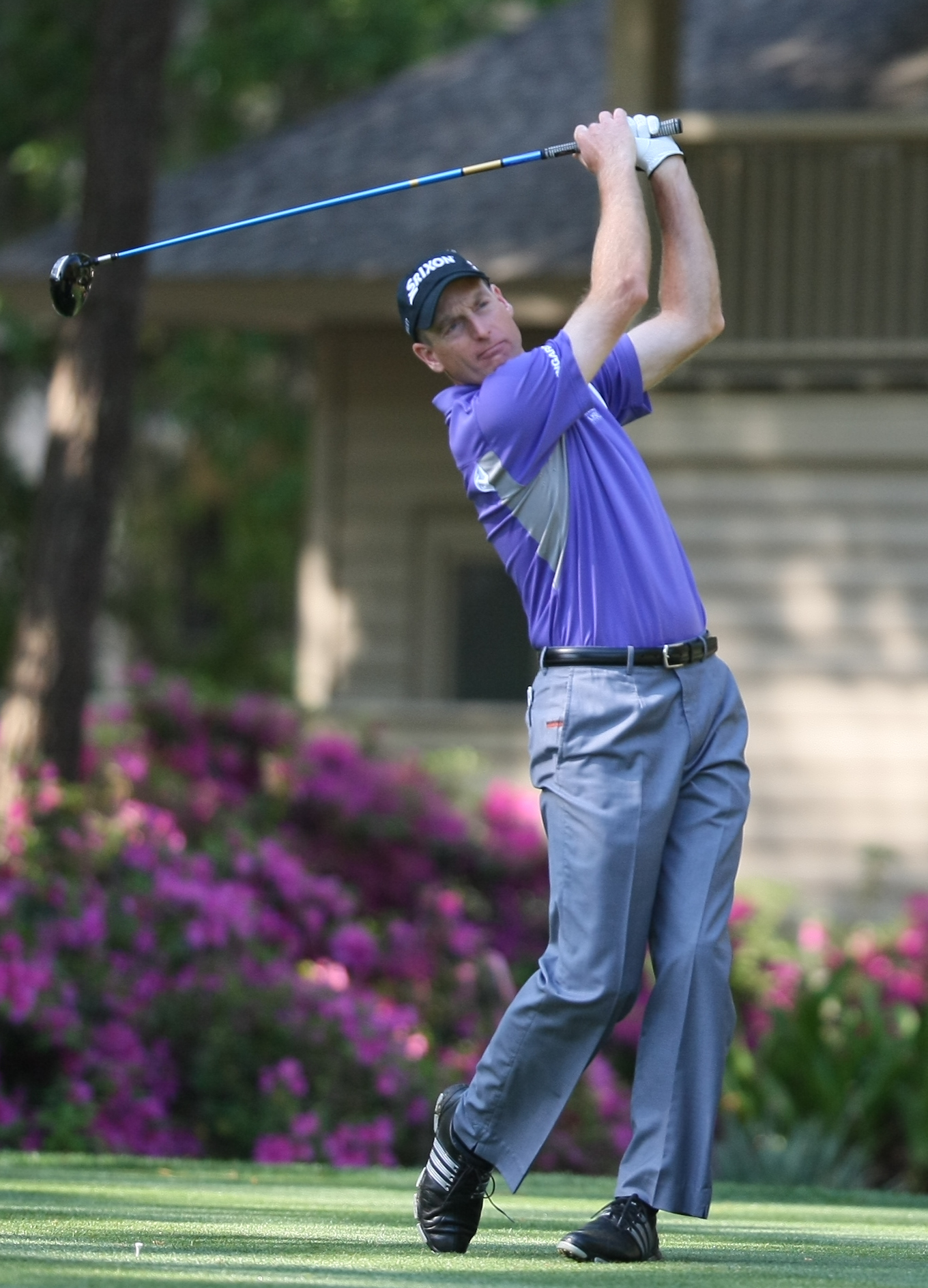
- Furyk in 2010
- Venue: TPC River Highlands
- Location: Cromwell, Connecticut
- Date: August 7, 2016

On August 7, 2016, Jim Furyk shot a 58 on the PGA Tour during the final round of the Travelers Championship, held at TPC River Highlands in Cromwell, Connecticut. The round set a new Tour record and was the seventh sub-60 round in the history of the PGA Tour.

== Background ==
Furyk was 46 years old at the time of the round and in his 23rd year on the PGA Tour. He had won 17 times in his career, including the 2003 U.S. Open, his only major championship title. He also won the FedEx Cup in 2010.

Prior to Furyk's round, only six players had shot rounds of 59 in PGA Tour history. The first was Al Geiberger in 1977. Furyk himself was the last to do it, at the BMW Championship in 2013. There had been approximately 1.5 million rounds played in Tour history at the time, and no one had ever managed to shoot lower than 59.

Just a week earlier, Stephan Jäger had shot the first round of 58 on the Korn Ferry Tour in winning the Ellie Mae Classic.

The 2016 Travelers Championship was a 72-hole stroke-play event held at TPC River Highlands, a par-70, 6,841-yard course. The tournament began on August 4, a week after the PGA Championship. Furyk had finished in 73rd place at the PGA Championship, and did not get off to a good start at the Travelers. He shot 73 (+3) in the first round and had to shoot 66 (−4) in Friday's second round to make the cut on the number. He then shot two-over 72 in the third round and went into the fourth and final round at one-over for the tournament, in 70th place out of 73 players to make the cut and 16 strokes behind leader Daniel Berger.

== The round ==
Furyk teed off at 8:41 a.m. EDT, more than five hours before the leaders, in the third group with Miguel Ángel Carballo. He found the green in two shots on the first hole, a 434-yard par-4, but missed a 14-footer for birdie and tapped in for par. His first birdie of the round came at the second hole, holing a 16-foot putt. At the third, Furyk hit his drive 285 yards down the fairway and pitching wedge from 135 yards from the flag, holing out for an eagle.

He made his second birdie of the round at the fourth after hitting his approach from 206 yards to 4 feet and making the putt. He failed to birdie the par-3 fifth hole, but came back to two-putt for birdie at the 574-yard par-5 sixth hole to go five-under on the round.

At the seventh, a 443-yard par-four, Furyk hit his approach from 142 yards to within 2 feet and tapped in for another birdie. He holed a 16-footer for birdie at the eighth, then closed out the front-nine by hitting his second shot into the ninth green from 137 yards to 1 foot for his fourth birdie in a row. He made the turn in 27 (−8), one off the PGA Tour record set by Corey Pavin in 2006.

Furyk was so far out of contention at the start of the day that television coverage did not pick up his round until he played the 10th hole. He made a 14-footer for birdie on the hole, then made another birdie putt from 16 feet at the par-3 11th. His seventh birdie in a row came at the 12th after he hit his approach from 137 yards to 4 feet.

Now 11-under on his round through 12 holes, Furyk needed to play his last six in even par to shoot 59. He decided to lay up on the 523-yard par-5 13th hole instead of going for the green in two. His chip shot from 102 yards, however, flew too far and left him a 35-footer for birdie. He missed the putt, ending his birdie streak, but tapped in from 2 feet for par. After pars at the 14th and 15th, Furyk holed a 23-footer for birdie at the par-3 16th to go 12-under.

Needing only pars on the last two holes for the scoring record, Furyk left his approach on the par-four 17th on the upper tier of the green and was faced with a tricky downhill 44-foot putt. He left it three feet short but converted the par save. At the 18th, Furyk drove into the middle of the fairway and hit his second shot 138 yards to the green, leaving him 26 feet away from the flag. While the putt just slid past the cup to the right, he tapped in for par for the first round of 58 in PGA Tour history.

Furyk hit 13/14 fairways—his only miss coming at the seventh, where he still made birdie—and all 18 greens in regulation. He averaged 21 feet with his approach shots and needed 24 putts.

Despite the history-making round, Furyk actually missed a few opportunities to shoot even lower. He failed to birdie the par-5 13th, then narrowly missed from 12 feet at the 14th, his putt staying just to the right of the hole. At the 15th, Furyk had a seven-footer for birdie but the putt hit the right side of the cup and lipped out.

The round nearly didn't count. Furyk's playing partner, Carballo, incorrectly marked him down for a birdie three on the 14th. Fortunately, Carballo found the mistake before submitting the scorecard. Had he not done so, Furyk would have been disqualified.

By shooting 12 under par, Furyk jumped from 70th place to a tie for fifth, finishing three shots behind champion Russell Knox.

Nine players have shot 59 since Furyk's round—Justin Thomas, Adam Hadwin, Brandt Snedeker, Kevin Chappell, Scottie Scheffler, Cameron Young, Hayden Springer, Jake Knapp and Michael Kim, but none have equaled Furyk's record.

== Hole by hole ==
1. (434 yards, par-4): Drive 291 yards to fairway, 9-iron 137 yards to 14 feet, missed the putt and tapped in from eight inches. Par (E)
2. (341 yards, par-4): Drive 276 yards to fairway, 60-degree wedge to 16 feet, made putt. Birdie (−1)
3. (431 yards, par-4): Drive 285 yards to fairway, holed pitching wedge from 135 yards. Eagle (−3)
4. (481 yards, par-4): Drive 281 yards to fairway, 4-iron from 206 yards to four feet, made the putt. Birdie (−4)
5. (223 yards, par-3): Hybrid 227 yards to green, missed putt from 23 feet, tapped in from two feet. Par (−4)
6. (574 yards, par-5): Drive 294 yards to fairway, 3-wood 263 yards to fairway, third shot to three feet and made the putt. Birdie (−5)
7. (443 yards, par-4): Drive 289 yards to rough, 9-iron from 142 yards to two feet, made the putt. Birdie (−6)
8. (202 yards, par-3): 4-iron 205 yards to green, made 16-foot putt. Birdie (−7)
9. (406 yards, par-4): Hybrid 230 yards to fairway, pitching wedge 137 yards to green, made one-foot putt. Birdie (−8)
10. (462 yards, par-4): Drive 303 yards to fairway, 8-iron 160 yards to green, made 14-foot putt. Birdie (−9)
11. (158 yards, par-3): 9-iron 163 yards to green, made 16-foot putt. Birdie (−10)
12. (411 yards, par-4): 3-wood 265 yards to fairway, 9-iron 137 yards to green, made four-foot putt. Birdie (−11)
13. (523 yards, par-5): Drive 269 yards to fairway, 7-iron 164 yards to fairway, sand wedge to 35 feet, missed putt and tapped in from two feet. Par (−11)
14. (421 yards, par-4): Drive 281 yards to fairway, 9-iron to green, missed 12-foot putt and tapped in. Par (−11)
15. (296 yards, par-4): Drive 267 yards to fairway, 7-iron 94 feet to green, seven-foot putt lipped out. Par (−11)
16. (171 yards, par-3): 8-iron 157 yards to green, made 23-foot putt. Birdie (−12)
17. (420 yards, par-4): Hybrid 230 yards to fairway, 8-iron 168 yards to green, two-putted from 44 feet. Par (−12)
18. (444 yards, par-4): Drive 293 yards to fairway, 9-iron 138 yards to green, missed putt from 26 feet, made two-foot putt. Par (−12)

== Scorecard ==
Hole	1	2	3	4	5	6	7	8	9	Front	10	11	12	13	14	15	16	17	18	Back	Total
Par	4	4	4	4	3	5	4	3	4	35	4	3	4	5	4	4	3	4	4	35	70
Strokes	4	3	2	3	3	4	3	2	3	27	3	2	3	5	4	4	2	4	4	31	58
	E	−1	−3	−4	−4	−5	−6	−7	−8	−8	−9	−10	−11	−11	−11	−11	−12	−12	−12	−4	−12
