= 2010 FedEx Cup Playoffs =

Tournament information
- Dates: August 26 – September 26, 2010
- Location: Ridgewood Country Club; TPC Boston; Cog Hill Golf & Country Club; East Lake Golf Club
- Tour: PGA Tour

Statistics
- Field: 125 for The Barclays; 100 for Deutsche Bank; 70 for BMW Championship; 30 for Tour Championship
- Prize fund: $35,000,000 bonus money
- Winner's share: $10,000,000 bonus money

Champion
- (United States) Jim Furyk
- 2,980 points

The 2010 FedEx Cup Playoffs, the series of four golf tournaments that determined the season champion on the U.S.-based PGA Tour, began on August 26 and ended on September 26. It included the following four events:

- The Barclays — Ridgewood Country Club, Paramus, New Jersey
- Deutsche Bank Championship — TPC Boston, Norton, Massachusetts
- BMW Championship — Cog Hill Golf & Country Club, Lemont, Illinois
- The Tour Championship — East Lake Golf Club, Atlanta, Georgia

These were the fourth FedEx Cup playoffs since their inception in 2007.

The point distributions can be seen here.

== Regular season rankings ==
Place	Player	Points	Events
1	(South Africa) Ernie Els	1,846	16
2	(United States) Steve Stricker	1,697	15
3	(United States) Jim Furyk	1,691	18
4	(United States) Phil Mickelson	1,629	16
5	(England) Justin Rose	1,593	18
6	(United States) Jeff Overton	1,536	22
7	(United States) Hunter Mahan	1,528	20
8	(United States) Bubba Watson	1,498	18
9	(United States) Matt Kuchar	1,437	21
10	(South Africa) Tim Clark	1,409	19

== The Barclays ==
The Barclays was played August 26–29. Of the 125 players eligible to play in the event, three did not enter: Paul Goydos (ranked 63), Sergio García (101), and Corey Pavin (110). Jim Furyk was disqualified from the tournament for missing his pro-am tee time. Of the 121 entrants, 72 made the second-round cut at even-par 141.

Matt Kuchar won by making a birdie on the first hole of a sudden-death playoff with Martin Laird and moved to first place in the standings. The top 100 players in the points standings advanced to the Deutsche Bank Championship.

					FedEx Cup rank	
Place	Player	Score	To par	Winnings ($)	After	Before
1	(United States) Matt Kuchar	68-69-69-66=272	−12	1,350,000	1	9
2	(Scotland) Martin Laird	69-67-65-71=272	−12	810,000	3	95
T3	(United States) Kevin Streelman	72-63-71-68=274	−10	435,000	18	102
T3	(United States) Steve Stricker	70-70-68-66=274	−10	435,000	2	2
T5	(Australia) Jason Day	67-67-70-71=275	−9	263,438	14	28
T5	(United States) Ryan Palmer	66-74-66-69=275	−9	263,438	13	23
T5	(South Africa) Rory Sabbatini	68-74-69-64=275	−9	263,438	33	60
T5	(United States) Vaughn Taylor	65-70-71-69=275	−9	263,438	21	38
T9	(United States) Dustin Johnson	71-69-64-72=276	−8	202,500	6	11
T9	(Australia) Adam Scott	66-71-68-71=276	−8	202,500	19	32
T9	(United States) Heath Slocum	67-71-70-68=276	−8	202,500	34	50

== Deutsche Bank Championship ==
The Deutsche Bank Championship was played September 3–6. Of the 100 players eligible to play in the event, one did not enter: Kenny Perry. Of the 99 entrants, 72 made the second-round cut at one-under-par, 141.

Charley Hoffman shot a final round 62 to win by five strokes and move to second place in the standings. The top 70 players in the points standings advanced to the BMW Championship.

					FedEx Cup rank	
Place	Player	Score	To par	Winnings ($)	After	Before
1	(United States) Charley Hoffman	64-67-69-62=262	−22	1,350,000	2	59
T2	(Australia) Jason Day	63-67-66-71=267	−17	560,000	4	14
T2	(England) Luke Donald	65-67-66-69=267	−17	560,000	5	17
T2	(Australia) Geoff Ogilvy	64-72-65-66=267	−17	560,000	9	52
T5	(United States) Tom Gillis	67-71-65-65=268	−16	273,750	48	92
T5	(Australia) Adam Scott	67-69-65-67=268	−16	273,750	15	19
T5	(United States) Brandt Snedeker	66-64-67-71=268	−16	273,750	31	53
8	(Australia) John Senden	66-68-69-67=270	−14	232,500	38	64
9	(United States) Steve Stricker	65-68-67-71=271	−13	217,500	3	2
10	(United States) D. J. Trahan	64-69-69-70=272	−12	202,500	36	51

== BMW Championship ==
The BMW Championship was played September 9–12. All 70 players eligible to play in the event did so. There was no cut. The top 30 players in FedEx Cup points after this event advanced to the Tour Championship and also earned spots in the 2011 Masters, U.S. Open, and (British) Open Championship.

Dustin Johnson won the event by one stroke over Paul Casey and moved to second in the rankings. Former FedEx Cup winners Tiger Woods (2007 and 2009) and Vijay Singh (2008) finished 42nd and 57th, respectively, on the points list and did not advance to The Tour Championship.

With the FedEx Cup points reset after the BMW Championship, all 30 remaining players had at least a mathematical chance to secure the season crown, and any of the top five players could claim the FedEx Cup with a win in The Tour Championship.

					FedEx Cup rank	
Place	Player	Score	To par	Winnings ($)	After	Before
1	(United States) Dustin Johnson	68-70-68-69=275	−9	1,350,000	2	16
2	(England) Paul Casey	69-69-69-69=276	−8	810,000	5	21
T3	(South Korea) K. J. Choi	71-69-69-69=278	−6	360,000	23	52
T3	(South Korea) Kevin Na	70-69-69-70=278	−6	360,000	20	41
T3	(United States) Matt Kuchar	64-72-70-72=278	−6	360,000	1	1
T3	(United States) Ryan Moore	65-74-66-73=278	−6	360,000	26	58
7	(South Africa) Retief Goosen	67-71-71-70=279	−5	251,250	17	20
T8	(United States) Phil Mickelson	72-71-70-67=280	−4	217,500	10	14
T8	(United States) Steve Stricker	70-73-67-70=280	−4	217,500	4	3
T8	(South Korea) Charlie Wi	67-69-70-74=280	−4	217,500	33	37

== Reset points ==
The points were reset after the BMW Championship.

Place	Player	Points	Reset points	Events
1	(United States) Matt Kuchar	4,935	2,500	24
2	(United States) Dustin Johnson	4,299	2,250	22
3	(United States) Charley Hoffman	3,449	2,000	22
4	(United States) Steve Stricker	3,372	1,800	18
5	(England) Paul Casey	3,015	1,600	16
6	(Australia) Jason Day	2,633	1,400	23
7	(England) Luke Donald	2,597	1,200	19
8	(South Africa) Ernie Els	2,343	1,000	19
9	(Scotland) Martin Laird	2,294	800	24
10	(United States) Phil Mickelson	2,249	600	19

== The Tour Championship ==
The Tour Championship was played September 23–26, after a one-week break. All 30 golfers who qualified for the tournament played, and there was no cut. Jim Furyk won the tournament and the FedEx Cup.

					FedEx Cup rank	
Place	Player	Score	To par	Winnings ($)	After	Before
1	(United States) Jim Furyk	67-65-70-70=272	−8	1,350,000	1	11
2	(England) Luke Donald	66-66-71-70=273	−7	810,000	3	7
3	(South Africa) Retief Goosen	71-66-66-71=274	−6	517,500	10	17
T4	(England) Paul Casey	66-71-69-69=275	−5	330,000	6	5
T4	(United States) Nick Watney	71-74-63-67=275	−5	330,000	12	28
6	(United States) Charley Hoffman	71-67-69-70=277	−3	270,000	4	3
T7	(South Korea) K. J. Choi	68-68-74-68=278	−2	247,500	15	23
T7	(South Africa) Ernie Els	71-71-71-65=278	−2	247,500	9	8
T9	(United States) Zach Johnson	74-72-66-67=279	−1	208,125	17	19
T9	(United States) Ryan Moore	70-72-68-69=279	−1	208,125	21	26
T9	(United States) Kevin Streelman	70-70-69-70=279	−1	208,125	25	29
T9	(Colombia) Camilo Villegas	73-69-68-69=279	−1	208,125	20	25

== Final leaderboard ==
Place	Player	Points	Winnings ($)
1	(United States) Jim Furyk	2,980.0	10,000,000
2	(United States) Matt Kuchar	2,727.5	3,000,000
3	(England) Luke Donald	2,700.0	2,000,000
4	(United States) Charley Hoffman	2,500.0	1,500,000
5	(United States) Dustin Johnson	2,492.5	1,000,000
6	(England) Paul Casey	2,250.0	800,000
7	(United States) Steve Stricker	2,027.5	700,000
8	(Australia) Jason Day	1,660.0	600,000
9	(South Africa) Ernie Els	1,437.5	550,000
10	(South Africa) Retief Goosen	1,360.0	500,000

For the full list see here.

== Table of qualifying players ==
Table key:

Win
Top-10 finish
Did not advance to next tournament
Played way into next tournament

	Player	Pre-Playoffs		The Barclays		Deutsche Bank		BMW Champ.		Reset points	Tour Champ.	
	Player	Points	Rank	Finish	Rank after	Finish	Rank after	Finish	Rank after	Reset points	Finish	Final rank
(South Africa)	Ernie Els	1,846	1	71	5	T30	7	T13	8	1,000	T7	9
(United States)	Steve Stricker	1,697	2	T3	2	9	3	T8	4	1,800	T25	7
(United States)	Jim Furyk	1,691	3	DQ	8	T37	11	T15	11	480	1	1
(United States)	Phil Mickelson	1,629	4	CUT	10	T25	14	T8	10	600	T22	13
(England)	Justin Rose	1,593	5	T15	4	CUT	10	T21	13	440	T15	16
(United States)	Jeff Overton	1,536	6	T56	12	CUT	19	T57	24	270	29	29
(United States)	Hunter Mahan	1,528	7	T31	7	T33	8	T37	15	400	T15	18
(United States)	Bubba Watson	1,498	8	T31	9	T37	12	T50	18	340	T17	22
(United States)	Matt Kuchar	1,437	9	1	1	T11	1	T3	1	2,500	T25	2
(South Africa)	Tim Clark	1,409	10	CUT	16	T45	22	T21	21	300	T13	24
(United States)	Dustin Johnson	1,362	11	T9	6	T57	16	1	2	2,250	T22	5
(United States)	Ben Crane	1,304	12	T12	11	CUT	18	T45	22	290	T17	27
(United States)	Bo Van Pelt	1,272	13	CUT	25	T25	23	T54	30	210	24	30
(United States)	Anthony Kim	1,216	14	CUT	27	CUT	34	T48	41	–	–	41
(Colombia)	Camilo Villegas	1,213	15	T64	26	T61	33	T11	25	260	T9	20
(United States)	Zach Johnson	1,191	16	T21	15	T30	17	T15	19	320	T9	17
(Australia)	Robert Allenby	1,169	17	T47	24	T45	27	T24	27	240	T17	28
(United States)	J. B. Holmes	1,153	18	CUT	29	T11	24	T60	34	–	–	34
(United States)	Rickie Fowler*	1,147	19	T36	22	T41	25	T45	32	–	–	32
(Sweden)	Carl Pettersson	1,142	20	CUT	30	CUT	39	T30	40	–	–	40
(Northern Ireland)	Rory McIlroy*	1,101	21	T56	28	T37	29	T37	36	–	–	36
(England)	Luke Donald	1,089	22	T15	17	T2	5	T37	7	1,200	2	3
(United States)	Ryan Palmer	1,071	23	T5	13	T11	13	T43	16	380	28	23
(South Africa)	Retief Goosen	1,068	24	T21	20	T25	20	7	17	360	3	10
(Zimbabwe)	Brendon de Jonge*	1,035	25	CUT	37	T45	40	T63	51	–	–	51
(United States)	Bill Haas	1,025	26	T47	31	T22	28	T30	31	–	–	31
(England)	Paul Casey	992	27	T12	23	T25	21	2	5	1,600	T4	6
(Australia)	Jason Day	988	28	T5	14	T2	4	T54	6	1,400	T17	8
(United States)	Nick Watney	984	29	T36	32	T33	30	T15	28	230	T4	12
(Australia)	Stuart Appleby	957	30	T52	36	T57	43	T60	52	–	–	52
(United States)	Ricky Barnes*	947	31	CUT	41	T57	54	T67	64	–	–	64
(Australia)	Adam Scott	940	32	T9	19	T5	15	T15	14	420	27	19
(United States)	Jason Bohn	926	33	CUT	43	T41	46	69	62	–	–	62
(South Korea)	K. J. Choi	922	34	CUT	44	T45	52	T3	23	280	T7	15
(United States)	Ryan Moore	893	35	CUT	47	T67	58	T3	26	250	T9	21
(United States)	Sean O'Hair	858	36	T31	35	CUT	50	T37	47	–	–	47
(Sweden)	Freddie Jacobson	826	37	CUT	50	T37	55	T48	58	–	–	58
(United States)	Vaughn Taylor	824	38	T5	21	CUT	32	T30	35	–	–	35
(Australia)	Geoff Ogilvy	815	39	CUT	52	T2	9	T24	12	460	T13	14
(United States)	Brandt Snedeker	813	40	CUT	53	T5	31	T37	37	–	–	37
(United States)	Kevin Na	804	41	T36	39	T33	41	T3	20	310	T17	26
(United States)	Scott Verplank	786	42	T68	54	WD	70	T67	70	–	–	70
(England)	Brian Davis	781	43	T60	49	T22	47	T54	53	–	–	53
(United States)	David Toms	748	44	CUT	60	T45	67	T15	55	–	–	55
(United States)	Bryce Molder	748	45	T36	46	CUT	60	T30	60	–	–	60
(United States)	Charles Howell III	746	46	CUT	62	T67	75	–	–	–	–	75
(United States)	Lucas Glover	743	47	CUT	63	T65	74	–	–	–	–	74
(Australia)	Marc Leishman	738	48	T36	48	T61	57	T11	44	–	–	44
(England)	Ian Poulter	733	49	T15	38	T45	44	T13	39	–	–	39
(United States)	Heath Slocum	722	50	T9	34	T65	42	T50	36	–	–	46
(United States)	Brian Gay	714	51	T21	40	CUT	56	T30	54	–	–	54
(South Korea)	Charlie Wi	690	52	T27	45	T18	37	T8	33	–	–	33
(South Korea)	Yong-eun Yang	678	53	T47	56	T45	61	T63	67	–	–	67
(United States)	Stewart Cink	678	54	T15	42	T18	35	T21	38	–	–	38
(Republic of Ireland)	Pádraig Harrington	662	55	T47	57	CUT	73	–	–	–	–	73
(Australia)	Matt Jones	647	56	T60	70	T33	64	T37	63	–	–	63
(United States)	Spencer Levin*	646	57	T64	71	CUT	81	–	–	–	–	81
(United States)	Steve Marino	636	58	CUT	78	T41	72	–	–	–	–	72
(United States)	John Rollins	634	59	CUT	79	T45	77	–	–	–	–	77
(South Africa)	Rory Sabbatini	618	60	T5	33	CUT	45	T50	48	–	–	48
(United States)	Jason Dufner	617	61	CUT	81	T18	65	T45	65	–	–	65
(United States)	J. J. Henry	598	62	72	82	CUT	86	–	–	–	–	86
(United States)	Paul Goydos	597	63	DNP	84	70	87	–	–	–	–	87
(United States)	Shaun Micheel	595	64	CUT	85	71	88	–	–	–	–	88
(Fiji)	Vijay Singh	588	65	CUT	86	T11	63	T24	57	–	–	57
(United States)	D. J. Trahan	577	66	T21	51	10	36	70	49	–	–	49
(United States)	Michael Sim*	573	67	T36	66	T11	53	T24	45	–	–	45
(Australia)	Steve Elkington	571	68	CUT	89	CUT	92	–	–	–	–	92
(Australia)	Greg Chalmers	558	69	T31	61	T41	62	T24	56	–	–	56
(United States)	Justin Leonard	556	70	T36	68	T30	59	T30	59	–	–	59
(United States)	Kenny Perry	555	71	T68	90	DNP	93	–	–	–	–	93
(United States)	Jimmy Walker*	554	72	T52	77	CUT	84	–	–	–	–	84
(United States)	Kris Blanks*	554	73	CUT	91	T22	71	–	–	–	–	71
(United States)	Tom Gillis*	554	74	CUT	92	T5	48	T24	43	–	–	43
(United States)	Chad Campbell	551	75	T60	83	DQ	89	–	–	–	–	89
(Canada)	Stephen Ames	548	76	T36	69	T45	69	T57	68	–	–	68
(United States)	Charley Hoffman	546	77	T27	59	1	2	T30	3	2,000	6	4
(United States)	D. A. Points	544	78	T47	74	CUT	82	–	–	–	–	82
(United States)	Pat Perez	534	79	T60	87	CUT	90	–	–	–	–	90
(United States)	Tim Petrovic	532	80	T21	58	T45	66	T57	66	–	–	66
(United States)	Alex Prugh*	526	81	CUT	95	CUT	97	–	–	–	–	97
(United States)	Boo Weekley	526	82	CUT	96	CUT	98	–	–	–	–	98
(Argentina)	Ángel Cabrera	524	83	T15	55	T18	49	T63	61	–	–	61
(United States)	Garrett Willis*	517	84	CUT	97	WD	99	–	–	–	–	99
(United States)	Blake Adams*	514	85	CUT	98	T61	95	–	–	–	–	95
(United States)	Chad Collins*	512	86	T64	94	CUT	96	–	–	–	–	96
(United States)	Chris Riley	512	87	CUT	99	CUT	100	–	–	–	–	100
(United States)	Josh Teater*	502	88	T36	75	T45	76	–	–	–	–	76
(United States)	Kevin Sutherland	499	89	CUT	101	–	–	–	–	–	–	101
(United States)	Jerry Kelly	493	90	CUT	102	–	–	–	–	–	–	102
(Germany)	Alex Čejka	489	91	CUT	103	–	–	–	–	–	–	103
(United States)	Derek Lamely*	487	92	CUT	104	–	–	–	–	–	–	104
(Australia)	Aaron Baddeley	481	93	T56	93	69	94	–	–	–	–	94
(United States)	Webb Simpson	478	94	T36	80	CUT	85	–	–	–	–	85
(Scotland)	Martin Laird	477	95	2	3	T25	6	T50	9	800	30	11
(United States)	Davis Love III	475	96	T31	72	T61	80	–	–	–	–	80
(United States)	Matt Bettencourt	472	97	CUT	106	–	–	–	–	–	–	106
(United States)	Chris Couch*	472	98	T21	67	CUT	79	–	–	–	–	79
(Australia)	John Senden	467	99	T15	64	8	38	T63	50	–	–	50
(United States)	Jeff Maggert	463	100	WD	108	–	–	–	–	–	–	108
(Spain)	Sergio García	461	101	DNP	109	–	–	–	–	–	–	109
(United States)	Kevin Streelman	460	102	T3	18	T45	26	T43	29	220	T9	25
(United States)	Briny Baird	458	103	CUT	111	–	–	–	–	–	–	111
(United States)	Joe Ogilvie	454	104	CUT	112	–	–	–	–	–	–	112
(United States)	John Merrick	449	105	T68	110	–	–	–	–	–	–	110
(United States)	Bill Lunde	449	106	CUT	113	–	–	–	–	–	–	113
(Japan)	Ryuji Imada	445	107	T27	73	T57	78	–	–	–	–	78
(United States)	J. P. Hayes	439	108	T27	76	CUT	83	–	–	–	–	83
(United States)	Dean Wilson	434	109	CUT	114	–	–	–	–	–	–	114
(United States)	Corey Pavin	433	110	DNP	115	–	–	–	–	–	–	115
(United States)	Bob Estes	432	111	CUT	116	–	–	–	–	–	–	116
(United States)	Tiger Woods	431	112	T12	65	T11	51	T15	42	–	–	42
(United States)	Cameron Beckman	427	113	CUT	118	–	–	–	–	–	–	118
(United States)	Troy Matteson	425	114	T36	88	CUT	91	–	–	–	–	91
(Argentina)	Andrés Romero	418	115	T52	100	T11	68	T60	69	–	–	69
(United States)	Ben Curtis	416	116	CUT	119	–	–	–	–	–	–	119
(United States)	Jonathan Byrd	415	117	T56	105	–	–	–	–	–	–	105
(United States)	Michael Letzig	415	118	CUT	120	–	–	–	–	–	–	120
(Australia)	Nathan Green	414	119	CUT	121	–	–	–	–	–	–	121
(United States)	David Duval*	404	120	T64	117	–	–	–	–	–	–	117
(United States)	Kevin Stadler	394	121	CUT	122	–	–	–	–	–	–	122
(United States)	Woody Austin	394	122	CUT	123	–	–	–	–	–	–	123
(Canada)	Graham DeLaet*	393	123	CUT	124	–	–	–	–	–	–	124
(United States)	Robert Garrigus	382	124	T52	107	–	–	–	–	–	–	107
(United States)	Scott Piercy	380	125	CUT	125	–	–	–	–	–	–	125

* First-time Playoffs participant
