= List of former point distributions of the FedEx Cup =

The following tables list the point distributions used in the FedEx Cup during the regular season and playoffs, as well as the playoff reset element of the FedEx Cup. Various distribution seen below were in effect from 2007 to 2016. The current distributions are at list of point distributions of the FedEx Cup.

== Regular point distribution ==
Only golfers who make the first cut for an event will receive points for that event. In case of a two-cut system (used if 78 or more players make the cut after two rounds), the low 70 and ties advance to the final round, and players who do not advance to the fourth round after the second cut receive points. At the AT&T Pebble Beach National Pro-Am, where only 60 players make the cut after three rounds, players in the standings who do not make the cut and are between 61st and 70th (and ties) will also receive points. In case of a tie, point totals are added together and divided among all golfers tied for a particular position at the end of a tournament. For example, if four golfers finish tied for fifth place, the fifth through eighth place points are summed and divided by four, with each of the golfers receiving the same number of points.

2009–2016

Position	PGA Tour events	Masters, Players, U.S. Open, British Open, and PGA Championship	World Golf Championship events	Additional events	
Position	PGA Tour events	Masters, Players, U.S. Open, British Open, and PGA Championship	World Golf Championship events	2009–12	2013–16
1	500	600	550	250	300
2	300	330	315	150	165
3	190	210	200	95	105
4	135	150	140	70	80
5	110	120	115	55	65
6	100	110	105	50	60
7	90	100	95	45	55
8	85	94	89	43	50
9	80	88	83	40	45
10	75	82	78	37.5	40
11	70	77	73	35.0	37.5
12	65	72	69	32.5	35.0
13	60	68	65	30.0	32.5
14	57	64	62	28.5	31.0
15	56	61	59	28.0	30.5
16	55	59	57	27.5	30.0
17	54	57	55	27.0	29.5
18	53	55	53	26.5	29.0
19	52	53	52	26.0	28.5
20	51			25.5	28.0
21	50			25.0	27.5
22	49			24.5	27.0
23	48			24.0	26.5
24	47			23.5	26.0
25	46			23.0	25.5
26	45			22.5	25.0
27	44			22.0	24.5
28	43			21.5	24.0
29	42			21.0	23.5
30	41			20.5	23.0
31	40			20.0	22.5
32	39			19.5	22.0
33	38			19.0	21.5
34	37			18.5	21.0
35	36			18.0	20.5
36	35			17.5	20.0
37	34			17.0	19.5
38	33			16.5	19.0
39	32			16.0	18.5
40	31			15.5	18.0
41	30			15.0	17.5
42	29			14.5	17.0
43	28			14.0	16.5
44	27			13.5	16.0
45	26			13.0	15.5
46	25			12.5	15
47	24			12.0	14.5
48	23			11.5	14.0
49	22			11.0	13.5
50	21			10.5	13.0
51	20			10.0	12.5
52	19			9.5	12.0
53	18			9.0	11.5
54	17			8.5	11.0
55	16			8.0	10.5
56	15			7.5	10.0
57	14			7.0	9.5
58	13			6.5	9.0
59	12			6.0	8.5
60	11			5.5	8.0
61	10			5.0	7.5
62	9			4.5	7.0
63	8			4.0	6.5
64	7			3.5	6.0
65	6			3.0	5.5
66	5			2.5	5
67	4			2.0	4
68	3			1.5	3
69	2			1.0	2
70	1			0.5	1
71	0.98			0.49	0.98
72	0.96			0.48	0.96
73	0.94			0.47	0.94
74	0.92			0.46	0.92
75	0.90			0.45	0.90
76	0.88			0.44	0.88
77	0.86			0.43	0.86
78	0.84			0.42	0.84
79	0.82			0.41	0.82
80	0.80			0.40	0.80
81	0.78			0.39	0.78
82	0.76			0.38	0.76
83	0.74			0.37	0.74
84	0.72			0.36	0.72
85	0.70			0.35	0.70

2007 and 2008

Position	PGA Tour events	Masters, Players, U.S. Open, British Open, and PGA Championship	World Golf Championship events	Additional events
1	4,500	4,950	4,725	2,250
2	2,700	2,970	2,835	1,350
3	1,700	1,870	1,785	850
4	1,200	1,320	1,260	600
5	1,000	1,100	1,050	500
6	900	990	945	450
7	837.5	921.3	879.4	418.8
8	775	852.5	813.8	387.5
9	725	797.5	761.3	362.5
10	675	742.5	708.8	337.5
11	625	687.5	656.3	312.5
12	575	632.5	603.8	287.5
13	525	577.5	551.3	262.5
14	475	522.5	498.8	237.5
15	450	495	472.5	225
16	425	467.5	446.3	212.5
17	400	440	420	200
18	375	412.5	393.8	187.5
19	350	385	367.5	175
20	325	357.5	341.3	162.5
21	300	330	315	150
22	280	308	294	140
23	260	286	273	130
24	240	264	252	120
25	220	242	231	110
26	200	220	210	100
27	192.5	211.8	202.1	96.3
28	185	203.5	194.3	92.5
29	177.5	195.3	186.4	88.8
30	170	187	178.5	85
31	162.5	178.8	170.6	81.3
32	155	170.5	162.8	77.5
33	147.5	162.3	154.9	73.8
34	141.3	155.4	148.3	70.6
35	135	148.5	141.8	67.5
36	128.8	141.6	135.2	64.4
37	122.5	134.8	128.6	61.3
38	117.5	129.3	123.4	58.8
39	112.5	123.8	118.1	56.3
40	107.5	118.3	112.9	53.8
41	102.5	112.8	107.6	51.3
42	97.5	107.3	102.4	48.8
43	92.5	101.8	97.1	46.3
44	87.5	96.3	91.9	43.8
45	82.5	90.8	86.6	41.3
46	77.5	85.3	81.4	38.8
47	72.5	79.8	76.1	36.3
48	68.5	75.4	71.9	34.3
49	65	71.5	68.3	32.5
50	63	69.3	66.2	31.5
51	61.5	67.7	64.6	30.8
52	60	66	63	30
53	59	64.9	62	29.5
54	58	63.8	60.9	29
55	57.5	63.3	60.4	28.8
56	57	62.7	59.9	28.5
57	56.5	62.2	59.3	28.3
58	56	61.6	58.8	28
59	55.5	61.1	58.3	27.8
60	55	60.5	57.8	27.5
61	54.5	60	57.2	27.3
62	54	59.4	56.7	27
63	53.5	58.9	56.2	26.8
64	53	58.3	55.7	26.5
65	52.5	57.8	55.1	26.3
66	52	57.2	54.6	26
67	51.5	56.7	54.1	25.8
68	51	56.1	53.6	25.5
69	50.5	55.6	53	25.3
70	50	55	52.5	25
71	49.5	54.5	52	24.8
72	49	53.9	51.5	24.5
73	48.5	53.4	50.9	24.3
74	48	52.8	50.4	24
75	47.5	52.3	49.9	23.8
76	47	51.7	49.4	23.5
77	46.5	51.2	48.8	23.3
78	46	50.6	48.3	23
79	45.5	50.1	47.8	22.8
80	45	49.5	47.3	22.5
81	44.5	49	46.7	22.3
82	44	48.4	46.2	22
83	43.5	47.9	45.7	21.8
84	43	47.3	45.2	21.5
85	42.5	46.8	44.6	21.3

== Playoff reset ==
In 2007 and 2008, after the Wyndham Championship, players who are in the top 144 have their points increased with respect to the following chart, the equivalent of "seeding" the players. Players who have performed better during the regular season (and thus, have more points) will more likely advance past the first event in the playoffs. The points on the reset scale will carry over into the playoffs.

The points table was modified for the 2008 season, compressing the points spreads, in an effort to create more volatility in the playoffs.

Beginning in 2009, the points from the regular season carry-over to the first three playoff tournaments (which carry five times the points as the regular season tournaments). The points are reset for The Tour Championship according to the table below. Starting with the 2015 playoffs, the playoff events were only worth four times as many points as standard regular season events, and the points reset for the Tour Championship was modified accordingly.

2009–2018

Position	Points '09–'14	Points '15-'16	Points '17-'18
1	2,500	2,000	2,000
2	2,250	1,800	1,800
3	2,000	1,600	1,520
4	1,800	1,440	1,296
5	1,600	1,280	1,280
6	1,400	1,120	1,120
7	1,200	960	960
8	1,000	800	800
9	800	640	640
10	600	480	480
11	480	384	384
12	460	368	368
13	440	352	352
14	420	336	336
15	400	320	314
16	380	304	293
17	360	288	272
18	340	272	251
19	320	256	231
20	310	248	219
21	300	240	206
22	290	232	194
23	280	224	182
24	270	216	170
25	260	208	161
26	250	200	151
27	240	192	142
28	230	184	133
29	220	176	124
30	210	168	115

2007 and 2008

Position	Points '08	Points '07	Position	Points '08	Points '07	Position	Points '08	Points '07	Position	Points '08	Points '07
1	100,000	100,000	37	96,350	92,725	73	94,910	90,025	109	93,470	87,325
2	99,500	99,000	38	96,310	92,650	74	94,870	89,950	110	93,430	87,250
3	99,250	98,500	39	96,270	92,575	75	94,830	89,875	111	93,390	87,175
4	99,000	98,000	40	96,230	92,500	76	94,790	89,800	112	93,350	87,100
5	98,750	97,500	41	96,190	92,425	77	94,750	89,725	113	93,310	87,025
6	98,625	97,250	42	96,150	92,350	78	94,710	89,650	114	93,270	86,950
7	98,500	97,000	43	96,110	92,275	79	94,670	89,575	115	93,230	86,875
8	98,375	96,750	44	96,070	92,200	80	94,630	89,500	116	93,190	86,800
9	98,250	96,500	45	96,030	92,125	81	94,590	89,425	117	93,150	86,725
10	98,125	96,250	46	95,990	92,050	82	94,550	89,350	118	93,110	86,650
11	98,050	96,100	47	95,950	91,975	83	94,510	89,275	119	93,070	86,575
12	97,975	95,950	48	95,910	91,900	84	94,470	89,200	120	93,030	86,500
13	97,900	95,800	49	95,870	91,825	85	94,430	89,125	121	92,990	86,425
14	97,825	95,650	50	95,830	91,750	86	94,390	89,050	122	92,950	86,350
15	97,750	95,500	51	95,790	91,675	87	94,350	88,975	123	92,910	86,275
16	97,675	95,350	52	95,750	91,600	88	94,310	88,900	124	92,870	86,200
17	97,600	95,200	53	95,710	91,525	89	94,270	88,825	125	92,830	86,125
18	97,525	95,050	54	95,670	91,450	90	94,230	88,750	126	92,790	86,050
19	97,450	94,900	55	95,630	91,375	91	94,190	88,675	127	92,750	85,975
20	97,375	94,750	56	95,590	91,300	92	94,150	88,600	128	92,710	85,900
21	97,300	94,600	57	95,550	91,225	93	94,110	88,525	129	92,670	85,825
22	97,225	94,450	58	95,510	91,150	94	94,070	88,450	130	92,630	85,750
23	97,150	94,300	59	95,470	91,075	95	94,030	88,375	131	92,590	85,675
24	97,075	94,150	60	95,430	91,000	96	93,990	88,300	132	92,550	85,600
25	97,000	94,000	61	95,390	90,925	97	93,950	88,225	133	92,510	85,525
26	96,925	93,850	62	95,350	90,850	98	93,910	88,150	134	92,470	85,450
27	96,850	93,700	63	95,310	90,775	99	93,870	88,075	135	92,430	85,375
28	96,775	93,550	64	95,270	90,700	100	93,830	88,000	136	92,390	85,300
29	96,700	93,400	65	95,230	90,625	101	93,790	87,925	137	92,350	85,225
30	96,630	93,250	66	95,190	90,550	102	93,750	87,850	138	92,310	85,150
31	96,590	93,175	67	95,150	90,475	103	93,710	87,775	139	92,270	85,075
32	96,550	93,100	68	95,110	90,400	104	93,670	87,700	140	92,230	85,000
33	96,510	93,025	69	95,070	90,325	105	93,630	87,625	141	92,190	84,925
34	96,470	92,950	70	95,030	90,250	106	93,590	87,550	142	92,150	84,850
35	96,430	92,875	71	94,990	90,175	107	93,550	87,475	143	92,110	84,775
36	96,390	92,800	72	94,950	90,100	108	93,510	87,400	144	92,070	84,700

== Playoff point distribution ==
Only golfers who make the cut for an event will receive points for that event.

The points table was modified for the 2008 season, increasing the points awarded, in an effort to create more volatility in the playoffs.

From 2009 through 2014, all playoff events carry the same points, which are five times the points for a regular season event. For the 2015 and 2016 playoffs, the playoff events were reduced to only four times the points of a regular season event.

2009–2016

Position	2009–14 Points	2015-16 Points
1	2,500	2,000
2	1,500	1,200
3	1,000	760
4	750	540
5	550	440
6	500	400
7	450	360
8	425	340
9	400	320
10	375	300
11	350	280
12	325	260
13	300	240
14	285	228
15	280	224
16	275	220
17	270	216
18	265	212
19	260	208
20	255	204
21	250	200
22	245	196
23	240	192
24	235	188
25	230	184
26	225	180
27	220	176
28	215	172
29	210	168
30	205	164
31	200	160
32	195	156
33	190	152
34	185	148
35	180	144
36	175	140
37	170	136
38	165	132
39	160	128
40	155	124
41	150	120
42	145	116
43	140	112
44	135	108
45	130	104
46	125	100
47	120	96
48	115	92
49	110	88
50	105	84
51	100	80
52	95	76
53	90	72
54	85	68
55	80	64
56	75	60
57	70	56
58	65	52
59	60	48
60	55	44
61	50	40
62	45	36
63	40	32
64	35	28
65	30	24
66	25	20
67	20	16
68	15	12
69	10	8
70	5	4
71	4.9	3.92
72	4.8	3.84
73	4.7	3.76
74	4.6	3.68
75	4.5	3.6
76	4.4	3.52
77	4.3	3.44
78	4.2	3.36
79	4.1	3.28
80	4.0	3.2
81	3.9	3.12
82	3.8	3.04
83	3.7	2.96
84	3.6	2.88
85	3.5	2.8

2007 and 2008

	The Barclays, Deutsche Bank, and BMW Championships		The Tour Championship	
Position	2008	2007	2008	2007
Total points	190,000	50,000	110,000	50,000
1	11,000	9,000	12,500	10,300
2	7,400	5,400	8,500	6,200
3	5,400	3,400	6,000	3,900
4	4,400	2,400	5,000	2,800
5	4,000	2,000	4,500	2,300
6	3,800	1,800	4,200	2,060
7	3,675	1,675	4,050	1,920
8	3,550	1,550	3,900	1,780
9	3,450	1,450	3,800	1,660
10	3,350	1,350	3,700	1,550
11	3,250	1,250	3,600	1,440
12	3,150	1,150	3,500	1,330
13	3,050	1,050	3,400	1,220
14	2,950	950	3,300	1,120
15	2,900	900	3,200	1,030
16	2,850	850	3,100	965
17	2,800	800	3,000	910
18	2,750	750	2,900	855
19	2,700	700	2,800	800
20	2,650	650	2,700	745
21	2,600	600	2,600	690
22	2,560	560	2,500	640
23	2,520	520	2,400	590
24	2,480	480	2,300	550
25	2,440	440	2,225	510
26	2,400	400	2,150	475
27	2,385	385	2,100	440
28	2,370	370	2,050	420
29	2,355	355	2,025	405
30	2,340	340	2,000	395
31	2,325	325		
32	2,310	310		
33	2,295	295		
34	2,282.5	283		
35	2,270	270		
36	2,257.5	258		
37	2,245	245		
38	2,235	235		
39	2,225	225		
40	2,215	215		
41	2,205	205		
42	2,195	195		
43	2,185	185		
44	2,175	175		
45	2,165	165		
46	2,155	155		
47	2,145	145		
48	2,137	137		
49	2,130	130		
50	2,126	126		
51	2,123	123		
52	2,120	120		
53	2,118	118		
54	2,116	116		
55	2,115	115		
56	2,114	114		
57	2,113	113		
58	2,112	112		
59	2,111	111		
60	2,110	110		
61	2,109	109		
62	2,108	108		
63	2,107	107		
64	2,106	106		
65	2,105	105		
66	2,104	104		
67	2,103	103		
68	2,102	102		
69	2,101	101		
70	2,100	100		
71	2,099	99		
72	2,098	98		
73	2,097	97		
74	2,096	96		
75	2,095	95		
76	2,094	94		
77	2,093	93		
78	2,092	92		
79	2,091	91		
80	2,090	90		
81	2,089	89		
82	2,088	88		
83	2,087	87		
84	2,086	86		
85	2,085	85		

== Prize fund distribution ==
The top 150 golfers in the final FedEx standings receive prize money. Most of this money is placed into tax-deferred retirement accounts, however finishers in the top ten receive their prize as a split of immediate cash and retirement accounts. The table below shows the combined amount for those places. Since 2019, the results for the top 30 finishers have been determined by the Tour Championship itself, with ties handled in the customary manner (for instance, in 2020, Justin Thomas and Xander Schauffele tied for second, and each received $4,500,000.

All amounts in the below table are in thousands of United States dollars.

Position	2007–2018	2019–2021	2022
1	10,000	15,000	18,000
2	3,000	5,000	6,500
3	2,000	4,000	5,000
4	1,500	3,000	4,000
5	1,000	2,500	3,000
6	800	1,900	2,500
7	700	1,300	2,000
8	600	1,100	1,500
9	550	950	1,250
10	500	830	1,000
11	300	750	950
12	290	705	900
13	280	660	850
14	270	620	800
15	250	595	760
16	245	570	720
17	240	550	700
18	235	535	680
19	230	520	660
20	225	505	640
21	220	490	620
22	215	478	600
23	210	466	580
24	205	456	565
25	200	445	550
26	195	435	540
27	190	425	530
28	185	415	520
29	180	405	510
30	175	395	500
31	165	200	250
32	155	195	236
33	150	190	228
34	145	186	221
35	142	183	214
36	140	181	211
37	138	179	209
38	137	177	208
39	136	175	207
40	135	173	206
41	134	171	205
42	133	169	204
43	132	168	203
44	131	167	202
45	130	166	201
46	129	165	200
47	128	164	199
48	127	163	198
49	126	162	197
50	125	161	196
51	120	160	195
52	115	159	194
53	114	158	193
54	113	157	192
55	110	156	191
56	110	155	190
57	110	154	189
58	110	153	188
59	110	152	187
60	110	151	186
61-65	110	150	185
66-70	110	140	175
71-80	80	110	140
81-85	75	110	140
86-100	75	105	130
101-125	70	101	120
126-150	32	70	85
Total	$35 million	$60 million	$75 million
