= List of point distributions of the FedEx Cup =

The following tables list the point distributions used in the FedEx Cup during the regular season and playoffs, as well as the starting score vs par element of the FedEx Cup's Tour Championship.

== Regular point distribution ==
In events in which there are cuts, only golfers who make the cut for an event will receive points for that event. In case of a tie, point totals are added together and divided among all golfers tied for a particular position at the end of a tournament. For example, if four golfers finish tied for fifth place, the fifth through eighth place points are summed and divided by four, with each of the golfers receiving the same number of points. The points system for major championships, the Players, and the signature events (AT&T Pebble Beach Pro-Am, Genesis Invitational, Arnold Palmer Invitational, RBC Heritage, Truist Championship, Memorial Tournament and Travelers Championship) were changed in advance of the 2024 season, and then adjusted before the 2025 season.

Position	PGA Tour events	Masters, Players, U.S. Open, The Open, and PGA Championship	Signature events	Additional events
1	500	750	700	300
2	300	500	400	165
3	190	350	350	105
4	135	325	325	80
5	110	300	300	65
6	100	270	275	60
7	90	250	225	55
8	85	225	200	50
9	80	200	175	45
10	75	175	150	40
11	70	155	130	37.5
12	65	135	120	35.0
13	60	115	110	32.5
14	57	105	100	31.0
15	55	95	90	30.5
16	53	85	80	30.0
17	51	75	70	29.5
18	49	70	65	29.0
19	47	65	60	28.5
20	45	60	55	28.0
21	43	55	50	26.76
22	41	53	48	25.51
23	39	51	46	24.27
24	37	49	44	23.02
25	35.5	47	42	22.09
26	34	45	40	21.16
27	32.5	43	38	20.22
28	31	41	36	19.29
29	29.5	39	34	18.36
30	28	37	32.5	17.42
31	26.5	35	31	16.49
32	25	33	29.5	15.56
33	23.5	31	28	14.62
34	22	29	26.5	13.69
35	21	27	25	13.07
36	20	26	24	12.44
37	19	25	23	11.82
38	18	24	22	11.2
39	17	23	21	10.58
40	16	22	20.25	9.96
41	15	21	19.5	9.33
42	14	20.25	18.75	8.71
43	13	19.5	18	8.09
44	12	18.75	17.25	7.47
45	11	18	16.5	6.84
46	10.5	17.25	15.75	6.53
47	10	16.5	15	6.22
48	9.5	15.75	14.25	5.91
49	9	15	13.5	5.6
50	8.5	14.25	13	5.29
51	8	13.5	12.5	4.98
52	7.5	13	12	4.67
53	7	12.5	11.5	4.36
54	6.5	12	11	4.04
55	6	11.5	10.5	3.73
56	5.8	11	10	3.61
57	5.6	10.5	9.5	3.48
58	5.4	10	9	3.36
59	5.2	9.5	8.5	3.24
60	5.0	9	8.25	3.11
61	4.8	8.5	8	2.99
62	4.6	8.25	7.75	2.86
63	4.4	8	7.5	2.74
64	4.2	7.75	7.25	2.61
65	4.0	7.5	7	2.49
66	3.8	7.25	6.75	2.36
67	3.6	7	6.5	2.24
68	3.4	6.75	6.25	2.12
69	3.2	6.5	6	1.99
70	3.0	6.25	5.75	1.87
71	2.9	6	5.5	1.8
72	2.8	5.75	5.25	1.74
73	2.7	5.5	5	1.68
74	2.6	5.25	4.75	1.62
75	2.5	5	4.5	1.56
76	2.4	4.75	4.25	1.49
77	2.3	4.5	4	1.43
78	2.2	4.25	3.75	1.37
79	2.1	4	3.5	1.31
80	2.0	3.75	3.25	1.24
81	1.9	3.5	3	1.18
82	1.8	3.25	2.75	1.12
83	1.7	3	2.5	1.06
84	1.6	2.75	2.25	1.00
85	1.5	2.5	2	0.93

== Playoff point distribution ==
Only golfers who make the cut for an event will receive points for that event.

Beginning in 2015, playoff tournaments carry four times the points of regular season tournaments, instead of five times, as was the case from 2009 to 2014.

Position	Points
1	2,000
2	1,200
3	760
4	540
5	440
6	400
7	360
8	340
9	320
10	300
11	280
12	260
13	240
14	228
15	220
16	212
17	204
18	196
19	188
20	180
21	172
22	164
23	156
24	148
25	142
26	136
27	130
28	124
29	118
30	112
31	106
32	100
33	94
34	88
35	84
36	80
37	76
38	72
39	68
40	64
41	60
42	56
43	52
44	48
45	44
46	42
47	40
48	38
49	36
50	34
51	32
52	30
53	28
54	26
55	24
56	23.2
57	22.4
58	21.6
59	20.8
60	20
61	19.2
62	18.4
63	17.6
64	16.8
65	16
66	15.2
67	14.4
68	13.6
69	12.8
70	12

== Tour Championship starting score ==
After the first two playoff events, the ranked position of each player determined their starting score for The Tour Championship relative to par.

Position	Score
1	−10
2	−8
3	−7
4	−6
5	−5
6–10	−4
11–15	−3
16–20	−2
21–25	−1
26–30	Even

== FedEx Cup reward distribution ==
After final regular season standings:

Position	Amount ($)
1	8,000,000
2	6,000,000
3	4,800,000
4	4,400,000
5	4,000,000
6	3,400,000
7	2,800,000
8	2,400,000
9	2,200,000
10	2,000,000
Total	40,000,000

After final playoff standings:

Position	Amount ($)	Position	Amount ($)
1	25,000,000	31	250,000
2	12,500,000	32	236,000
3	7,500,000	33	228,000
4	6,000,000	34	221,000
5	5,000,000	35	214,000
6	3,500,000	36	211,000
7	2,750,000	37	209,000
8	2,250,000	38	208,000
9	2,000,000	39	207,000
10	1,750,000	40	206,000
11	1,075,000	41	205,000
12	1,025,000	42	204,000
13	975,000	43	203,000
14	925,000	44	202,000
15	885,000	45	201,000
16	795,000	46	200,000
17	775,000	47	199,000
18	755,000	48	198,000
19	735,000	49	197,000
20	715,000	50	196,000
21	670,000	51	195,000
22	650,000	52	194,000
23	630,000	53	193,000
24	615,000	54	192,000
25	600,000	55	191,000
26	590,000	56	190,000
27	580,000	57	189,000
28	570,000	58	188,000
29	560,000	59	187,000
30	550,000	60	186,000
		61–65	185,000
		66–70	175,000
		71–85	140,000
		86–100	130,000
		101–125	120,000
		126–150	85,000
Total	$100,000,000		

== See also ==
- List of former point distributions of the FedEx Cup
