= 2010 PGA Tour =

Golf tour season

2010 PGA Tour season
- Duration: January 7, 2010 – November 14, 2010
- Number of official events: 46
- Most wins: (United States) Jim Furyk (3)
- FedEx Cup: (United States) Jim Furyk
- Money list: (United States) Matt Kuchar
- PGA Tour Player of the Year: (United States) Jim Furyk
- PGA Player of the Year: (United States) Jim Furyk
- Rookie of the Year: (United States) Rickie Fowler

The 2010 PGA Tour was the 95th season of the PGA Tour, the main professional golf tour in the United States. It was also the 42nd season since separating from the PGA of America, and the fourth edition of the FedEx Cup.

== Schedule ==
The following table lists official events during the 2010 season.

Date	Tournament	Location	Purse (US$)	Winner (Note: The number in parentheses after each winner's name is the number of PGA Tour events they had won up to and including that tournament. This information is only shown for PGA Tour members.)	OWGR points	Other tours (Note: ASA − Asian Tour.)	Notes
Jan 10	SBS Championship	Hawaii	5,600,000	(Australia) Geoff Ogilvy (7)	46		Winners-only event
Jan 17	Sony Open in Hawaii	Hawaii	5,500,000	(United States) Ryan Palmer (3)	50		
Jan 25	Bob Hope Classic	California	5,000,000	(United States) Bill Haas (1)	30		Pro-Am
Jan 31	Farmers Insurance Open	California	5,300,000	(United States) Ben Crane (3)	42		
Feb 7	Northern Trust Open	California	6,400,000	(United States) Steve Stricker (8)	58		
Feb 14	AT&T Pebble Beach National Pro-Am	California	6,200,000	(United States) Dustin Johnson (3)	48		Pro-Am
Feb 21	WGC-Accenture Match Play Championship	Arizona	8,500,000	(England) Ian Poulter (1)	74		World Golf Championship
Feb 21	Mayakoba Golf Classic	Mexico	3,600,000	(United States) Cameron Beckman (3)	24		Alternate event
Feb 28	Waste Management Phoenix Open	Arizona	6,000,000	(United States) Hunter Mahan (2)	56		
Mar 7	The Honda Classic	Florida	5,600,000	(Colombia) Camilo Villegas (3)	50		
Mar 14	WGC-CA Championship	Florida	8,500,000	(South Africa) Ernie Els (17)	74		World Golf Championship
Mar 15	Puerto Rico Open	Puerto Rico	3,500,000	(United States) Derek Lamely (1)	24		Alternate event
Mar 21	Transitions Championship	Florida	5,400,000	(United States) Jim Furyk (14)	58		
Mar 29	Arnold Palmer Invitational	Florida	6,000,000	(South Africa) Ernie Els (18)	60		Invitational
Apr 4	Shell Houston Open	Texas	5,800,000	(United States) Anthony Kim (3)	52		
Apr 11	Masters Tournament	Georgia	7,500,000	(United States) Phil Mickelson (38)	100		Major championship
Apr 18	Verizon Heritage	South Carolina	5,700,000	(United States) Jim Furyk (15)	48		
Apr 25	Zurich Classic of New Orleans	Louisiana	6,400,000	(United States) Jason Bohn (2)	28		
May 2	Quail Hollow Championship	North Carolina	6,500,000	(Northern Ireland) Rory McIlroy (1)	64		
May 9	The Players Championship	Florida	9,500,000	(South Africa) Tim Clark (1)	80		Flagship event
May 16	Valero Texas Open	Texas	6,100,000	(Australia) Adam Scott (7)	26		
May 23	HP Byron Nelson Championship	Texas	6,500,000	(Australia) Jason Day (1)	38		
May 30	Crowne Plaza Invitational at Colonial	Texas	6,200,000	(United States) Zach Johnson (7)	62		Invitational
Jun 6	Memorial Tournament	Ohio	6,000,000	(England) Justin Rose (1)	66		Invitational
Jun 13	St. Jude Classic	Tennessee	5,600,000	(England) Lee Westwood (2)	44		
Jun 20	U.S. Open	California	7,500,000	(Northern Ireland) Graeme McDowell (1)	100		Major championship
Jun 27	Travelers Championship	Connecticut	6,000,000	(United States) Bubba Watson (1)	38		
Jul 4	AT&T National	Pennsylvania	6,200,000	(England) Justin Rose (2)	48		Invitational
Jul 11	John Deere Classic	Illinois	4,400,000	(United States) Steve Stricker (9)	34		
Jul 18	The Open Championship	Scotland	£4,800,000	(South Africa) Louis Oosthuizen (1)	100		Major championship
Jul 18	Reno–Tahoe Open	Nevada	3,000,000	(United States) Matt Bettencourt (1)	24		Alternate event
Jul 25	RBC Canadian Open	Canada	5,100,000	(Sweden) Carl Pettersson (4)	34		
Aug 1	Greenbrier Classic	West Virginia	6,000,000	(Australia) Stuart Appleby (9)	32		New tournament
Aug 8	WGC-Bridgestone Invitational	Ohio	8,500,000	(United States) Hunter Mahan (3)	76		World Golf Championship
Aug 8	Turning Stone Resort Championship	New York	4,000,000	(United States) Bill Lunde (1)	24		Alternate event
Aug 15	PGA Championship	Wisconsin	7,500,000	(Germany) Martin Kaymer (1)	100		Major championship
Aug 22	Wyndham Championship	North Carolina	5,100,000	(India) Arjun Atwal (1)	28		
Aug 29	The Barclays	New Jersey	7,500,000	(United States) Matt Kuchar (3)	70		FedEx Cup playoff event
Sep 6	Deutsche Bank Championship	Massachusetts	7,500,000	(United States) Charley Hoffman (2)	70		FedEx Cup playoff event
Sep 12	BMW Championship	Illinois	7,500,000	(United States) Dustin Johnson (4)	70		FedEx Cup playoff event
Sep 26	The Tour Championship	Georgia	7,500,000	(United States) Jim Furyk (16)	54		FedEx Cup playoff event
Oct 3	Viking Classic	Mississippi	3,600,000	(United States) Bill Haas (2)	24		Fall Series
Oct 10	McGladrey Classic	Georgia	4,000,000	(United States) Heath Slocum (4)	30		New tournament Fall Series
Oct 17	Frys.com Open	California	5,000,000	(United States) Rocco Mediate (6)	24		Fall Series
Oct 24	Justin Timberlake Shriners Hospitals for Children Open	Nevada	4,300,000	(United States) Jonathan Byrd (4)	26		Fall Series
Nov 14	Children's Miracle Network Classic	Florida	4,700,000	(United States) Robert Garrigus (1)	24		Fall Series

=== Unofficial events ===
The following events were sanctioned by the PGA Tour, but did not carry FedEx Cup points or official money, nor were wins official.

Date	Tournament	Location	Purse ($)	Winner(s)	OWGR points	Other tours	Notes
Mar 23	Tavistock Cup	Florida	2,450,000	Team Lake Nona	n/a		Team event
Jun 29	CVS Caremark Charity Classic	Rhode Island	1,500,000	(United States) Ricky Barnes and (United States) J. B. Holmes	n/a		Team event
Oct 4	Ryder Cup	Wales	n/a	Team Europe	n/a		Team event
Oct 20	PGA Grand Slam of Golf	Bermuda	1,350,000	(South Africa) Ernie Els	n/a		Limited-field event
Oct 31	CIMB Asia Pacific Classic Malaysia	Malaysia	6,000,000	(United States) Ben Crane	38	ASA	New limited-field event
Nov 7	WGC-HSBC Champions	China	7,000,000	(Italy) Francesco Molinari	68		World Golf Championship
Nov 9	Wendy's 3-Tour Challenge	Nevada	1,000,000	PGA Tour	n/a		Team event
Dec 5	Chevron World Challenge	California	5,000,000	(Northern Ireland) Graeme McDowell	50		Limited-field event
Dec 12	Shark Shootout	Florida	3,000,000	(United States) Dustin Johnson and (England) Ian Poulter	n/a		Team event

== Location of tournaments ==
Location of official tournaments of the 2010 PGA Tour in the continental United States and Canada.
600-point event (Players & Majors)
550-point event (World Golf Championships)
500-point event (Regular events)
250-point event (Alternate events)
FedEx Cup playoff event
Fall Series event
Location of official tournaments of the 2010 PGA Tour outside the continental United States and Canada.
600-point event (Players & Majors)
500-point event (Regular events)
250-point event (Alternate events)

== FedEx Cup ==
=== Final standings ===
For full rankings, see 2010 FedEx Cup Playoffs.

Final top 10 players in the FedEx Cup:

Position	Player	Points	Bonus money ($)
1	(United States) Jim Furyk	2,980	10,000,000
2	(United States) Matt Kuchar	2,728	3,000,000
3	(England) Luke Donald	2,700	2,000,000
4	(United States) Charley Hoffman	2,500	1,500,000
5	(United States) Dustin Johnson	2,493	1,000,000
6	(England) Paul Casey	2,250	800,000
7	(United States) Steve Stricker	2,028	700,000
8	(Australia) Jason Day	1,660	600,000
9	(South Africa) Ernie Els	1,438	550,000
10	(South Africa) Retief Goosen	1,360	500,000

== Money list ==
The money list was based on prize money won during the season, calculated in U.S. dollars.

Position	Player	Prize money ($)
1	(United States) Matt Kuchar	4,910,477
2	(United States) Jim Furyk	4,809,622
3	(South Africa) Ernie Els	4,558,861
4	(United States) Dustin Johnson	4,473,122
5	(United States) Steve Stricker	4,190,235
6	(United States) Phil Mickelson	3,821,733
7	(England) Luke Donald	3,665,234
8	(England) Paul Casey	3,613,194
9	(England) Justin Rose	3,603,331
10	(United States) Hunter Mahan	3,574,550

== Awards ==
Award	Winner	Ref.
PGA Tour Player of the Year (Jack Nicklaus Trophy)	(United States) Jim Furyk	
PGA Player of the Year	(United States) Jim Furyk	
Rookie of the Year	(United States) Rickie Fowler	
Scoring leader (PGA Tour – Byron Nelson Award)	(United States) Matt Kuchar	
Scoring leader (PGA – Vardon Trophy)	(United States) Matt Kuchar	
Comeback Player of the Year	(Australia) Stuart Appleby	

== See also ==
- 2010 in golf
- 2010 Champions Tour
- 2010 Nationwide Tour
