= Jim Furyk =

American professional golfer (born 1970)

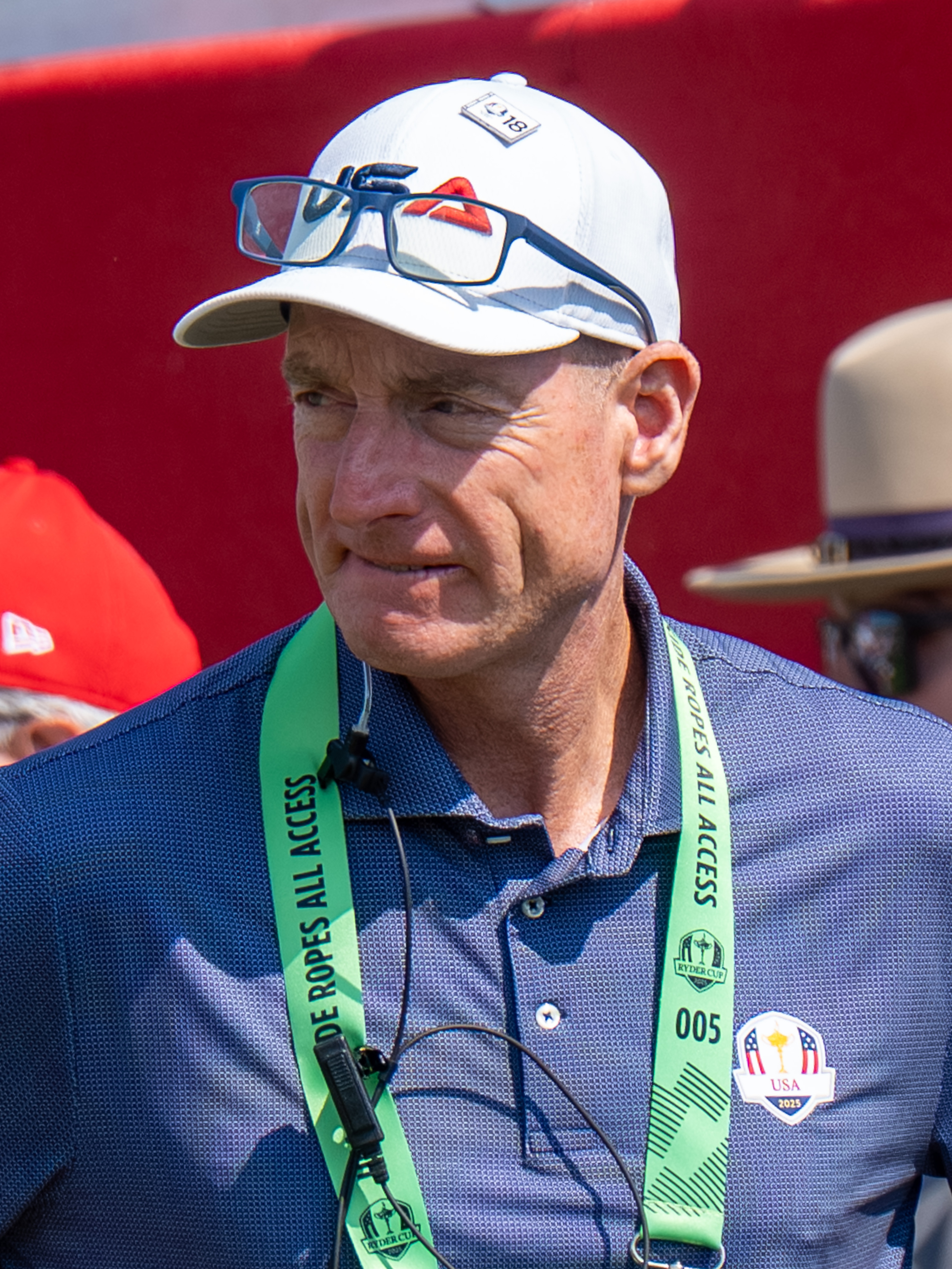
- Furyk at the 2025 Ryder Cup

Personal information
- Full name: James Michael Furyk
- Nickname: Mr. 58
- Nationality: United States
- Born: May 12, 1970 (age 56) West Chester, Pennsylvania, U.S.
- Height: 6 ft 2 in (188 cm)
- Weight: 185 lb (84 kg)
- Spouse: Tabitha (m. 2000)
- Children: 2

Career
- Sport: Golf
- College: University of Arizona
- Turned professional: 1992
- Current tours: PGA Tour; PGA Tour Champions
- Former tour: Nike Tour
- Professional wins: 29
- Highest ranking: 2 (September 10, 2006)

Number of wins by tour
- PGA Tour: 17
- European Tour: 1
- Sunshine Tour: 1
- Korn Ferry Tour: 1
- PGA Tour Champions: 3
- European Senior Tour: 1
- Other: 7

Best results in major championships (wins: 1)
- Masters Tournament: 4th: 1998, 2003
- PGA Championship: 2nd: 2013
- U.S. Open: Won: 2003
- The Open Championship: 4th/T4: 1997, 1998, 2006, 2014

Achievements and awards
- Vardon Trophy: 2006
- PGA Tour FedEx Cup winner: 2010
- PGA Tour Player of the Year: 2010
- PGA Player of the Year: 2010
- Payne Stewart Award: 2016
- PGA Tour Champions Rookie of the Year: 2020–21
- PGA Tour Champions Byron Nelson Award: 2020–21

James Michael Furyk (born May 12, 1970) is an American professional golfer and analyst who plays on the PGA Tour and the PGA Tour Champions. In 2010, he was the FedEx Cup champion and PGA Tour Player of the Year. He has won one major championship, the 2003 U.S. Open. Furyk holds the record for the lowest score in PGA Tour history, a round of 58 which he shot during the final round of the 2016 Travelers Championship, and has earned notoriety for his unorthodox golf swing.

In September 2006 he reached a career high of second in the Official World Golf Ranking. He ranked in the top-10 for over 440 weeks between 1999 and 2016.

== Early life ==
Furyk was born on May 12, 1970, in West Chester, Pennsylvania. His ancestry is Czech and Polish on his mother's side and Ukrainian and Hungarian on his father's side. His father, Mike, was an assistant pro at the Edgmont Country Club and later also spent time as a pro at West Chester Golf and Country Club as well as Hidden Springs Golf Course in Horsham, Pennsylvania. His early years were spent in the Pittsburgh suburbs learning the game from his father, who was also head pro at Uniontown Country Club in Uniontown, Pennsylvania.

Furyk graduated from Manheim Township High School in Lancaster County in 1988, where he played basketball in addition to being a state champion golfer. He played his junior golf at Meadia Heights Golf Club just south of Lancaster city. He played college golf at the University of Arizona in Tucson, where he was an All-American twice, and led the Wildcats to their first (and only) NCAA title in 1992.

== Professional career ==
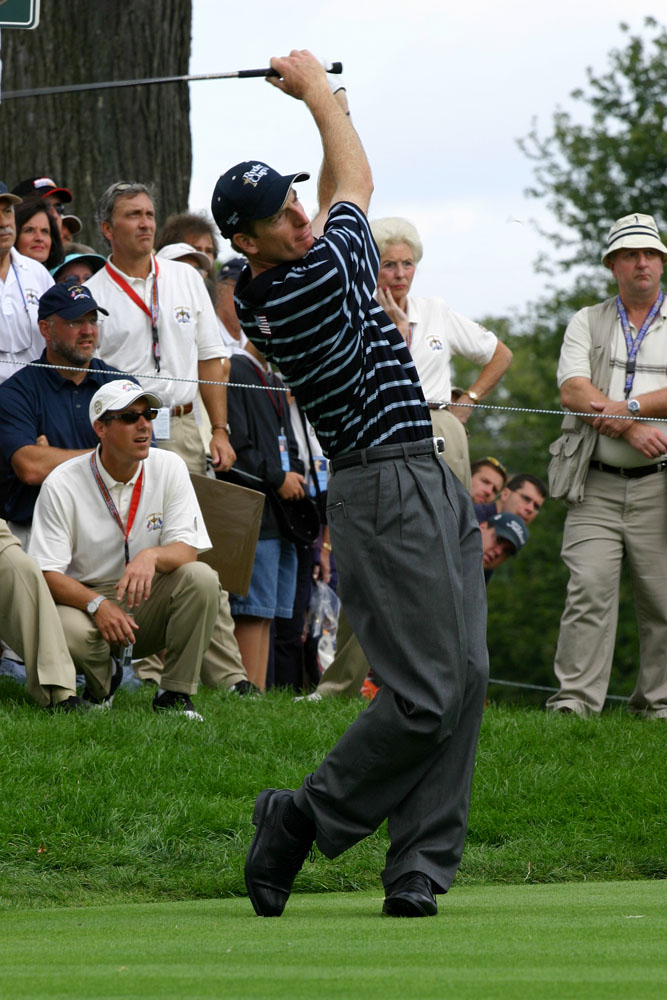
Furyk at the 2004 Ryder Cup

Furyk turned professional in 1992. He won the Nike Mississippi Gulf Coast Classic on the Nike Tour in 1993. He joined the PGA Tour in 1994 and won at least one tournament each year between 1998 and 2003. At the time, this was the second-best streak of winning seasons behind Tiger Woods and he made the top ten in the Official World Golf Ranking. Furyk's biggest win to date came on June 15, 2003, when he tied the record for the lowest 72-hole score in U.S. Open history to win his first major championship.

In 2004, he only played in 14 events after missing three months due to surgery to repair cartilage damage in his wrist; he missed six cuts and his highest finish was T6, which caused him to fall out of the top hundred on the money list. He returned to good form in 2005 and regained his top ten ranking, winning a PGA Tour event in that year and two in 2006. In the 2006 season, he finished a career-high second on the money list and won the Vardon Trophy for the first time. He had 13 top-10 finishes, including nine top-3s, four second-place finishes, and two victories.

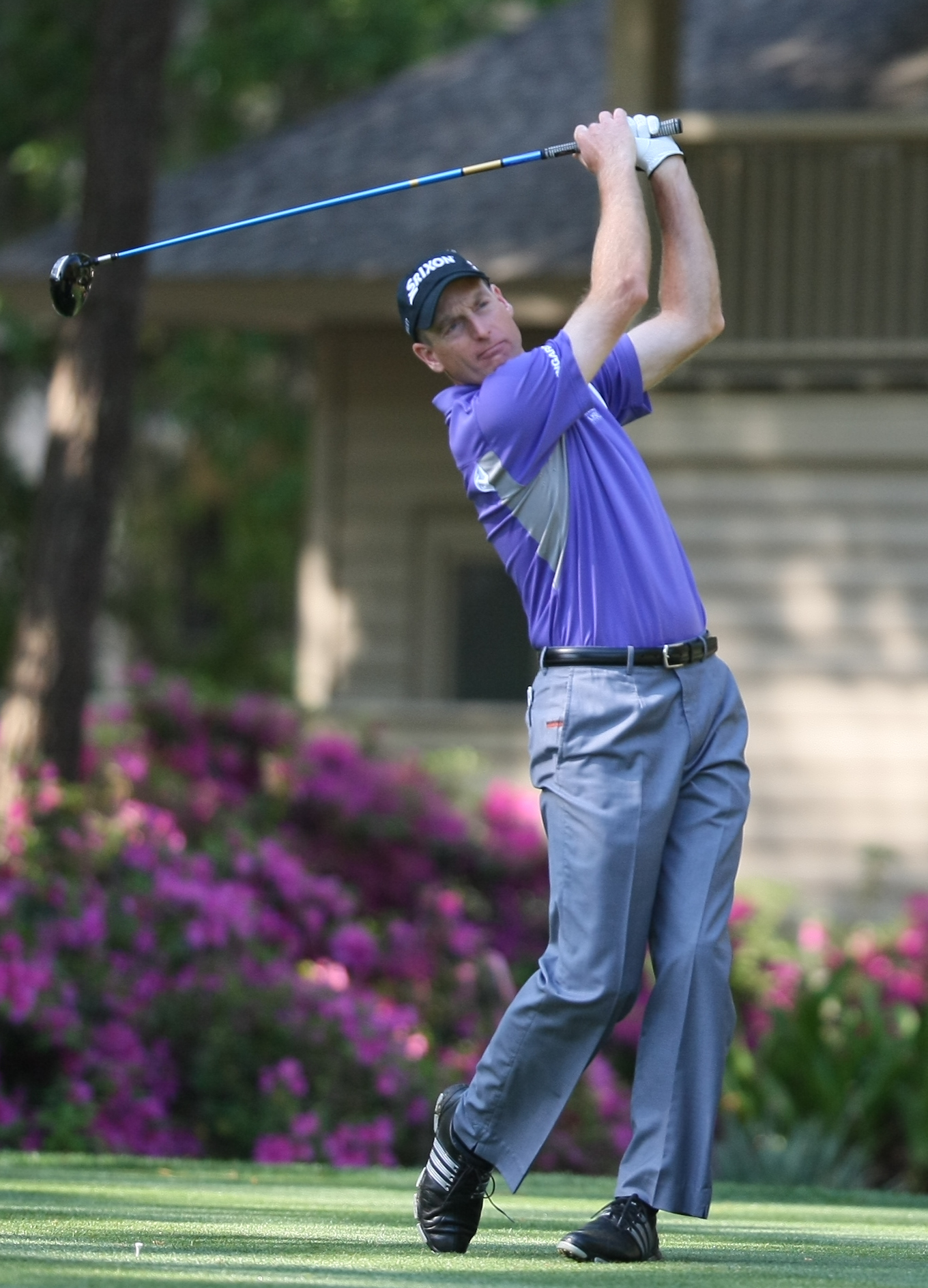
Furyk in 2010

The 2010 season was a banner one for Furyk. After going more than two seasons winless, he won a career-best three tournaments on Tour in 2010: The Transitions Championship, the Verizon Heritage, and the season-ending Tour Championship. His victory in the Tour Championship also earned him the 2010 FedEx Cup after winning by one stroke. His accomplishments in 2010 won him both the PGA Player of the Year and PGA Tour Player of the Year for the first time.

Since 2012, Furyk has come close on several occasions to winning more titles. At the 2012 U.S. Open, Furyk led after 54 holes and was still the leader deep into the final day, before snap hooking his drive into the trees at the 16th which led to a bogey and was followed by another at the 18th. He finished in a tie for fourth, two strokes behind Webb Simpson. At the 2012 WGC-Bridgestone Invitational, Furyk led after the first three rounds and looked set to win the championship as he held a one-stroke lead going into the final hole, but a double-bogey cost him the title to Keegan Bradley. At the 2013 PGA Championship, Furyk led by one stroke going into the final day over Jason Dufner, but this time his lead was overturned on the front nine and he was unable to reduce the deficit as Dufner won by two strokes. Furyk's caddy from 1999–2024 was Mike "Fluff" Cowan, who was Tiger Woods' caddy for Woods's first two years as a professional.

On September 13, 2013, Furyk shot a 12-under-par 59 in the second round of the BMW Championship at Conway Farms Golf Club in Lake Forest, Illinois, becoming just the sixth player to shoot 59 in a PGA Tour event.

Hole	10	11	12	13	14	15	16	17	18	Out	1	2	3	4	5	6	7	8	9	In	Total
Par	4	3	4	4	5	4	4	3	5	36	4	3	4	4	4	3	4	5	4	35	71
Score	3	2	3	4	4	2	4	2	4	28	4	2	3	3	5	3	3	5	3	31	59

In July 2014, Furyk held the 54-hole lead at the RBC Canadian Open, with a three stroke advantage over his nearest competitor Tim Clark. However Clark produced five birdies in his last eight holes to claim the title, after Furyk missed a 12 footer on the 18th green to force a playoff.

In February 2015, Furyk held a one shot lead at the AT&T Pebble Beach National Pro-Am going into the final round, but shot a two over round of 74 to finish six strokes behind Brandt Snedeker. Furyk's round was the worst of any player to finish within the top 50 on the final day. Since Furyk's last victory at The Tour Championship in 2010, he is 0-for-9 with a lead/co-lead after 54 holes. On April 19, 2015, Furyk ended the long slump when he defeated Kevin Kisner with birdie on the second playoff hole at the RBC Heritage. The victory was his second at the event and his 17th victory on the PGA Tour.

In 2015, at the BMW Championship, Furyk withdrew with a wrist injury. This was his first withdrawal since 1995, it also came at the same course he had shot a 59 two years before. Furyk qualified for the 2015 Presidents Cup team but could not play due to the same injury and instead became an assistant captain. J. B. Holmes replaced him on the team.

Furyk missed the early part of the 2016 season after undergoing wrist surgery. This caused him to miss the 2016 Masters Tournament and brought to end a run of 47 consecutive major championship appearances. In June 2016, at the 2016 U.S. Open, Furyk finished in a tie for second, three shots behind Dustin Johnson at one under par. He shot a four-under round of 66 in the final round to vault up the leaderboard. This was the third time during his career Furyk had been runner-up at the U.S. Open.

On August 7, 2016, Furyk shot a 12-under-par 58 in the final round of the Travelers Championship at TPC at River Highlands in Cromwell, Connecticut, becoming the first player to shoot 58 in a PGA Tour event. This also made Furyk the first PGA Tour pro to card two rounds under 60.

Hole	1	2	3	4	5	6	7	8	9	Out	10	11	12	13	14	15	16	17	18	In	Total
Par	4	4	4	4	3	5	4	3	4	35	4	3	4	5	4	4	3	4	4	35	70
Score	4	3	2	3	3	4	3	2	3	27	3	2	3	5	4	4	2	4	4	31	58

On January 11, 2017, Furyk was named as the United States Ryder Cup captain for 2018. At the 2018 Ryder Cup, the U.S. lost to the Europe team by 17½ points to 10½ at Le Golf National in France. Following the matches, Furyk was subject to criticism from Masters champion Patrick Reed. Reed criticized Furyk's manner of making pairings and, more specifically, his decision to break up the previously successful Reed-Jordan Spieth pairing.

The 2017–18 season was the first time Furyk was not fully exempt on the PGA Tour, playing the season with only past champion status. He started the 2018–19 season out of the 126–150 category.

On March 17, 2019, Furyk finished second in The Players Championship, one stroke behind Rory McIlroy. It was a welcome result for 48-year-old Furyk, who barely qualified for the tournament and who had struggled with injury and poor play in 2017 and 2018.

On May 2, 2024 it was announced that Furyk and long time caddy Mike "Fluff" Cowan, would split amicably after 25 years.

== PGA Tour Champions (2020–present) ==
On August 2, 2020, Furyk made his debut on the PGA Tour Champions, after having turned 50 years old in May 2020. He won The Ally Challenge in his first start on the tour.

In his second start on the PGA Tour Champions, on September 20, 2020, Furyk won the PURE Insurance Championship at Pebble Beach Golf Links in a playoff over Jerry Kelly. He joined Arnold Palmer and Bruce Fleisher as the only golfers to win their first two starts on tour.

In July 2021, Furyk won his first senior major tournament, the U.S. Senior Open at Omaha Country Club. Furyk defeated Mike Weir and Retief Goosen by three strokes. The win automatically qualifies him for the 2022 U.S. Open.

== Swing ==
As Mike Furyk describes in a Golf Digest issue in 2001, Jim Furyk's hips "underturn" during the backswing and "overturn" coming down. On the downswing, he draws the club in a large arc behind his body (viewing from his right hand side), then pastes his elbow against his right hip at impact. David Feherty described Furyk's swing as "an octopus falling out of a tree". Gary McCord said that it evokes the image of "a one-armed golfer using an axe to kill a snake in a telephone booth."

== Personal life ==
Furyk is married to his wife Tabitha, and they have two children. He owns homes in the Kapalua Resort and in Ponte Vedra Beach.

== Professional wins (29) ==
=== PGA Tour wins (17) ===
Legend
Major championships (1)
FedEx Cup playoff events (1)
Other PGA Tour (15)

No.	Date	Tournament	Winning score	To par	Margin of victory	Runner(s)-up
1	Oct 15, 1995	Las Vegas Invitational	67-65-65-67-67=331	−28	1 stroke	(United States) Billy Mayfair
2	Feb 18, 1996	United Airlines Hawaiian Open	68-71-69-69=277	−11	Playoff	(United States) Brad Faxon
3	Oct 18, 1998	Las Vegas Invitational (2)	67-68-69-63-68=335	−25	1 stroke	(United States) Mark Calcavecchia
4	Oct 17, 1999	Las Vegas Invitational (3)	67-64-63-71-66=331	−29	1 stroke	(United States) Jonathan Kaye
5	Mar 6, 2000	Doral-Ryder Open	65-67-68-65=265	−23	2 strokes	(United States) Franklin Langham
6	Jan 14, 2001	Mercedes Championships	69-69-69-67=274	−18	1 stroke	(South Africa) Rory Sabbatini
7	May 26, 2002	Memorial Tournament	71-70-68-65=274	−14	2 strokes	(United States) John Cook, (United States) David Peoples
8	Jun 15, 2003	U.S. Open	67-66-67-72=272	−8	3 strokes	(Australia) Stephen Leaney
9	Aug 3, 2003	Buick Open	68-66-65-68=267	−21	2 strokes	(United States) Briny Baird, (United States) Chris DiMarco, (Australia) Geoff Ogilvy, (United States) Tiger Woods
10	Jul 3, 2005	Cialis Western Open	64-70-67-69=270	−14	2 strokes	(United States) Tiger Woods
11	May 7, 2006	Wachovia Championship	68-69-68-71=276	−12	Playoff	(South Africa) Trevor Immelman
12	Sep 10, 2006	Canadian Open	63-71-67-65=266	−14	1 stroke	(United States) Bart Bryant
13	Jul 29, 2007	Canadian Open (2)	69-66-69-64=268	−16	1 stroke	(Fiji) Vijay Singh
14	Mar 21, 2010	Transitions Championship	67-68-67-69=271	−13	1 stroke	(South Korea) K. J. Choi
15	Apr 18, 2010	Verizon Heritage	67-68-67-69=271	−13	Playoff	(England) Brian Davis
16	Sep 26, 2010	The Tour Championship	67-65-70-70=272	−8	1 stroke	(England) Luke Donald
17	Apr 19, 2015	RBC Heritage (2)	71-64-68-63=266	−18	Playoff	(United States) Kevin Kisner

PGA Tour playoff record (4–8)

No.	Year	Tournament	Opponent(s)	Result
1	1996	United Airlines Hawaiian Open	(United States) Brad Faxon	Won with birdie on third extra hole
2	1997	United Airlines Hawaiian Open	(United States) Mike Reid, (United States) Paul Stankowski	Stankowski won with birdie on fourth extra hole Reid eliminated by par on first hole
3	1998	Buick Classic	(United States) J. P. Hayes	Lost to birdie on first extra hole
4	2001	WGC-NEC Invitational	(United States) Tiger Woods	Lost to birdie on seventh extra hole
5	2003	Ford Championship at Doral	(United States) Scott Hoch	Lost to birdie on third extra hole
6	2005	Wachovia Championship	(Spain) Sergio García, (Fiji) Vijay Singh	Singh won with par on fourth extra hole García eliminated by par on first hole
7	2005	Michelin Championship at Las Vegas	(United States) Wes Short Jr.	Lost to par on second extra hole
8	2006	Wachovia Championship	(South Africa) Trevor Immelman	Won with par on first extra hole
9	2007	Crowne Plaza Invitational at Colonial	(Germany) Bernhard Langer, (South Africa) Rory Sabbatini	Sabbatini won with birdie on first extra hole
10	2010	Verizon Heritage	(England) Brian Davis	Won with par on first extra hole
11	2012	Transitions Championship	(South Korea) Bae Sang-moon, (England) Luke Donald, (United States) Robert Garrigus	Donald won with birdie on first extra hole
12	2015	RBC Heritage	(United States) Kevin Kisner	Won with birdie on second extra hole

=== Sunshine Tour wins (1) ===
No.	Date	Tournament	Winning score	To par	Margin of victory	Runner-up
1	Dec 3, 2006	Nedbank Golf Challenge	68-66-68-74=276	−12	2 strokes	(Sweden) Henrik Stenson

=== Nike Tour wins (1) ===
No.	Date	Tournament	Winning score	To par	Margin of victory	Runner-up
1	Aug 1, 1993	Nike Mississippi Gulf Coast Classic	72-68-66=206	−10	Playoff	(United States) Bob Friend

Nike Tour playoff record (1–1)

No.	Year	Tournament	Opponent(s)	Result
1	1993	Nike Mississippi Gulf Coast Classic	(United States) Bob Friend	Won with birdie on first extra hole
2	1993	Nike Bakersfield Open	(United States) Clark Dennis, (United States) Sonny Skinner	Dennis won with birdie on first extra hole

=== South American Tour wins (1) ===
No.	Date	Tournament	Winning score	To par	Margin of victory	Runners-up
1	Dec 7, 1997	Argentine Open	67-70-68-70=275	−5	3 strokes	(United States) Chris DiMarco, (Sweden) Mathias Grönberg, (United States) Tim Hegna

=== Other wins (6) ===
No.	Date	Tournament	Winning score	To par	Margin of victory	Runner(s)-up
1	Nov 5, 1995	Lincoln-Mercury Kapalua International	65-65-71-70=271	−17	2 strokes	(United States) Russ Cochran, (England) Barry Lane, (United States) Jim McGovern
2	Aug 25, 1998	Fred Meyer Challenge (with (United States) David Duval)	65-61=126	−18	4 strokes	(Australia) Steve Elkington and (United States) Craig Stadler, (United States) Scott McCarron and (United States) Paul Stankowski
3	Dec 6, 2003	PGA Grand Slam of Golf	67-68=135	−9	8 strokes	(Canada) Mike Weir
4	Dec 4, 2005	Nedbank Golf Challenge	68-70-72-72=282	−6	Playoff	(Northern Ireland) Darren Clarke, (South Africa) Retief Goosen, (Australia) Adam Scott
5	Oct 15, 2008	PGA Grand Slam of Golf (2)	68-68=136	−4	Playoff	(Republic of Ireland) Pádraig Harrington
6	Dec 6, 2009	Chevron World Challenge	70-71-67-67=275	−13	1 stroke	(Northern Ireland) Graeme McDowell

Other playoff record (2–1)

No.	Year	Tournament	Opponent(s)	Result
1	2000	Fred Meyer Challenge (with (South Africa) David Frost)	(United States) John Cook and (United States) Mark O'Meara	Lost to birdie on first extra hole
2	2005	Nedbank Golf Challenge	(Northern Ireland) Darren Clarke, (South Africa) Retief Goosen, (Australia) Adam Scott	Won with birdie on second extra hole Goosen eliminated by par on first hole
3	2008	PGA Grand Slam of Golf	(Republic of Ireland) Pádraig Harrington	Won with eagle on first extra hole

=== PGA Tour Champions wins (3) ===
Legend
Senior major championships (1)
Other PGA Tour Champions (2)

No.	Date	Tournament	Winning score	Margin of victory	Runner(s)-up
1	Aug 2, 2020	The Ally Challenge	−14 (68-66-68=202)	2 strokes	(South Africa) Retief Goosen, (United States) Brett Quigley
2	Sep 20, 2020	PURE Insurance Championship	−12 (64-73-67=204)	Playoff	(United States) Jerry Kelly
3	Jul 11, 2021	U.S. Senior Open	−7 (72-64-66-71=273)	3 strokes	(South Africa) Retief Goosen, (Canada) Mike Weir

PGA Tour Champions playoff record (1–0)

No.	Year	Tournament	Opponent	Result
1	2020	PURE Insurance Championship	(United States) Jerry Kelly	Won with birdie on first extra hole

== Major championships ==
=== Wins (1) ===
Year	Championship	54 holes	Winning score	Margin	Runner-up
2003	U.S. Open	3 shot lead	−8 (67-66-67-72=272)	3 strokes	(Australia) Stephen Leaney

=== Results timeline ===
Results not in chronological order in 2020.

Tournament	1994	1995	1996	1997	1998	1999
Masters Tournament			T29	T28	4	T14
U.S. Open	T28		T5	T5	T14	T17
The Open Championship			T45	4	T4	T10
PGA Championship		T13	T17	T6	CUT	T8

Tournament	2000	2001	2002	2003	2004	2005	2006	2007	2008	2009
Masters Tournament	T14	T6	CUT	4		28	T22	T13	T33	T10
U.S. Open	60	T62	CUT	1	T48	T28	T2	T2	T36	T33
The Open Championship	T41	CUT	CUT	CUT	CUT	CUT	4	T12	T5	T34
PGA Championship	T72	T7	9	T18	CUT	T34	T29	CUT	T29	T63

Tournament	2010	2011	2012	2013	2014	2015	2016	2017	2018
Masters Tournament	CUT	T24	11	T25	T14	CUT		CUT	
U.S. Open	T16	CUT	T4	CUT	T12	T42	T2	T23	T48
The Open Championship	CUT	T48	T34	CUT	4	T30	T59		
PGA Championship	T24	T39	T42	2	T5	T30	T73	CUT	T71

Tournament	2019	2020	2021	2022
Masters Tournament				
PGA Championship	CUT	CUT		
U.S. Open	T28			CUT
The Open Championship	T63	NT		

Win
Top 10
Did not play

CUT = missed the half-way cut
"T" indicates a tie for a place
NT = no tournament due to COVID-19 pandemic

=== Summary ===
Tournament	Wins	2nd	3rd	Top-5	Top-10	Top-25	Events	Cuts made
Masters Tournament	0	0	0	2	4	12	20	16
PGA Championship	0	1	0	2	6	10	26	20
U.S. Open	1	3	0	7	7	12	26	22
The Open Championship	0	0	0	5	6	7	22	15
Totals	1	4	0	16	23	41	94	73

- Most consecutive cuts made – 13 (1994 U.S. Open – 1998 Open Championship)
- Longest streak of top-10s – 4 (1997 U.S. Open – 1998 Masters)

== Results in The Players Championship ==
Tournament	1995	1996	1997	1998	1999
The Players Championship	CUT	T13	T53	T35	T17

Tournament	2000	2001	2002	2003	2004	2005	2006	2007	2008	2009
The Players Championship	T61	T21	T14	T4		CUT	T3	T28	T27	T5

Tournament	2010	2011	2012	2013	2014	2015	2016	2017	2018	2019
The Players Championship	T47	CUT	T25	CUT	2	T56	T35	CUT		2

Top 10
Did not play

CUT = missed the halfway cut
"T" indicates a tie for a place

== Results in World Golf Championships ==
Results not in chronological order before 2015.

Tournament	1999	2000	2001	2002	2003	2004	2005	2006	2007	2008	2009	2010	2011	2012	2013	2014	2015	2016	2017	2018	2019
Championship	T11		NT^{1}	T33	T12	T36	T15	4	T35	T2	3	T37	T49		T35	T62	T12		T58		
Match Play	R64	R16	DNP	R16	R16		R64	R64	R32	R64	R16	R32	R64	R64	R32	QF	4		T30		T17
Invitational	T10	T4	2	T6	T6	T22	T24	3		T27	T51	T6	T23	T2	T9	T15	T3	T42			T27
Champions													T62								

^{1}Cancelled due to 9/11

Top 10
Did not play

QF, R16, R32, R64 = Round in which player lost in match play
"T" = Tied
NT = No tournament
Note that the HSBC Champions did not become a WGC event until 2009.

== Senior major championships ==
=== Wins (1) ===
Year	Championship	54 holes	Winning score	Margin	Runners-up
2021	U.S. Senior Open	4 shot lead	−7 (72-64-66-71=273)	3 strokes	(South Africa) Retief Goosen, (Canada) Mike Weir

=== Results timeline ===
Tournament	2021	2022	2023	2024
The Tradition		T68	T59	74
Senior PGA Championship	T16		T37	
U.S. Senior Open	1	T25		T55
Senior Players Championship	6			T26
The Senior Open Championship	T16			

Win
Top 10
Did not play

"T" indicates a tie for a place

== PGA Tour career summary ==
Season	Wins (Majors)	Earnings ($)	Rank
1994	0	236,603	78
1995	1	535,380	33
1996	1	738,950	26
1997	0	1,619,480	4
1998	1	2,054,334	3
1999	1	1,827,593	12
2000	1	1,940,519	17
2001	1	2,540,734	13
2002	1	2,363,250	14
2003	2 (1)	5,182,865	4
2004	0	691,675	116
2005	1	4,255,369	4
2006	2	7,213,316	2
2007	1	4,154,046	7
2008	0	3,455,714	12
2009	0	3,946,515	7
2010	3	4,809,622	2
2011	0	1,529,690	53
2012	0	3,623,805	12
2013	0	3,204,779	15
2014	0	5,987,395	3
2015	1	3,732,664	16
2016	0	1,538,204	71
2017	0	558,097	152
2018	0	660,010	139
2019	0	2,669,938	34
2020	0	224,450	185
Career*	17 (1)	71,294,997	3

*As of the 2020 season.

== U.S. national team appearances ==
Professional

- Ryder Cup: 1997, 1999 (winners), 2002, 2004, 2006, 2008 (winners), 2010, 2012, 2014, 2018 (non-playing captain), 2027 (non-playing captain)
- Presidents Cup: 1998, 2000 (winners), 2003 (tie), 2005 (winners), 2007 (winners), 2009 (winners), 2011 (winners), 2024 (non-playing captain, winners)
  - Presidents Cup record W–L–H: 20–10–3
- World Cup: 2003
- Wendy's 3-Tour Challenge (representing PGA Tour): 2002 (winners)

== See also ==
- 1993 PGA Tour Qualifying School graduates
- Lowest rounds of golf
