= Travelers Championship =

Professional golf tournament on the PGA Tour in Cromwell, Connecticut

Coordinates: 41.632°N 72.639°W

Tournament information
- Location: Cromwell, Connecticut
- Established: 1952
- Course: TPC at River Highlands
- Par: 70
- Length: 6,844 yards (6,258 m)
- Organized by: Greater Hartford Community Foundation
- Tour: PGA Tour
- Format: Stroke play
- Prize fund: US$20,000,000
- Month played: June
- Website: travelerschampionship.com

Tournament record score
- Aggregate: 257 Keegan Bradley (2023)
- To par: −25 Tim Norris (1982)

Current champion
- (Norway) Viktor Hovland

Location map
- Location in United States Location in Connecticut

The Travelers Championship is a professional golf tournament on the PGA Tour in Cromwell, Connecticut, a suburb south of Hartford. Since 1984 the tournament has been held at TPC River Highlands. It is managed by The Greater Hartford Community Foundation. In 2018 the Travelers Championship earned the Players Choice Award for the second consecutive year, which is voted on by PGA Tour members for its services, hospitality, attendance and quality of the course.

== History ==
The tournament was founded in 1952 as the Insurance City Open; It was renamed the Greater Hartford Open in 1967, a title that was retained through 2003. From 1973 through 1988, the GHO also bore the name of entertainer Sammy Davis Jr., who would often play in the pro-ams. Canon was a title sponsor from 1985 to 2002, and their employees would often take vacation time during tournament week to volunteer at the event. Buick was title sponsor from 2004 to 2006 and The Travelers Companies took over sponsorship in 2007.

For the tournament's first three decades, it was played at Wethersfield Country Club, about five miles (8 km) north. In 1984, after the PGA Tour bought and redesigned Edgewood Country Club, the event moved to the new TPC of Connecticut in Cromwell. In 1991, the course was substantially redesigned with a completely new front nine holes and renamed the TPC at River Highlands. This TPC property was the third PGA Tour owned/managed championship golf course in what would grow to a network of over 30 TPC Clubs (2010).

When Canon announced it would not renew its sponsorship after the 2002 season, organizers feared the tournament would lose its spot on the tour for the 2003 season if a new sponsor could not be found. A fundraising campaign, followed by Buick signing a three year sponsorship agreement, allowed the tournament to continue under the title Buick Championship. When Buick did not renew its sponsorship after the 2006 season, the tournament briefly lost its spot on the tour schedule, and a "less prestigious" spot on the Champions Tour was considered. However, a spot opened on the tour, and Travelers signed on to sponsor the tournament starting 2007.

The purse for the 2006 tournament, under Buick's sponsorship, was $4.4 million, with $792,000 going to the winner. From 2007 to 2010, the purse under Travelers' sponsorship was $6 million, with $1,080,000 going to the champion.

Over the last decade, longer hitters have done well at the tournament, with Stewart Cink, Hunter Mahan, J. J. Henry, Phil Mickelson, and Bubba Watson combining for six victories over a ten-year span. Mahan also finished tied for second in 2006 and 2008.

Its position on the calendar has varied; in 2005, it was played in late August, but in 2006, it was played in late June. Part of the FedEx Cup, the Travelers Championship has been played in late June, the week after the U.S. Open, since 2007. The 2016 tournament was played in August due to the Summer Olympics, but in 2017 the tournament returned to June.

For the 2020 season, it is part of the Open Qualifying Series providing up to two spots in the Open Championship for the top two non-exempt finishers in the top 8.

== Attendance ==
It is the second-most-attended PGA Tour event annually, behind only the Waste Management Phoenix Open. In 2011, the tournament attracted 240,000 fans for the week and 70,000 fans on Sunday. The tournament set a record attendance in 2002 with nearly 400,000 fans for the week. In 2017 about 290,000 fans attended, the most since Travelers started hosting the tournament.

== Course ==
Hole	1	2	3	4	5	6	7	8	9	Out	10	11	12	13	14	15	16	17	18	In	Total
Yards	434	341	431	481	223	574	443	202	406	3,535	462	158	411	523	421	296	171	420	444	3,306	6,841
Par	4	4	4	4	3	5	4	3	4	35	4	3	4	5	4	4	3	4	4	35	70

== Winners ==
Year	Winner	Score	To par	Margin of victory	Runner(s)-up	Purse (US$)	Winner's share ($)	Ref.
Travelers Championship
2026	(Norway) Viktor Hovland	259	−21	Playoff	(United States) Scottie Scheffler	20,000,000	3,600,000	
2025	(United States) Keegan Bradley (2)	265	−15	1 stroke	(England) Tommy Fleetwood (United States) Russell Henley	20,000,000	3,600,000	
2024	(United States) Scottie Scheffler	258	−22	Playoff	(South Korea) Tom Kim	20,000,000	3,600,000	
2023	(United States) Keegan Bradley	257	−23	3 strokes	(United States) Zac Blair (United States) Brian Harman	20,000,000	3,600,000	
2022	(United States) Xander Schauffele	261	−19	2 strokes	(United States) J. T. Poston (United States) Sahith Theegala	8,300,000	1,494,000	
2021	(United States) Harris English	267	−13	Playoff	(United States) Kramer Hickok	7,400,000	1,332,000	
2020	(United States) Dustin Johnson	261	−19	1 stroke	(United States) Kevin Streelman	7,400,000	1,332,000	
2019	(United States) Chez Reavie	263	−17	4 strokes	(United States) Keegan Bradley (United States) Zack Sucher	7,200,000	1,296,000	
2018	(United States) Bubba Watson (3)	263	−17	3 strokes	(England) Paul Casey (United States) Stewart Cink (United States) J. B. Holmes (United States) Beau Hossler	7,000,000	1,260,000	
2017	(United States) Jordan Spieth	268	−12	Playoff	(United States) Daniel Berger	6,800,000	1,224,000	
2016	(Scotland) Russell Knox	266	−14	1 stroke	(United States) Jerry Kelly	6,600,000	1,188,000	
2015	(United States) Bubba Watson (2)	264	−16	Playoff	(England) Paul Casey	6,400,000	1,152,000	
2014	(United States) Kevin Streelman	265	−15	1 stroke	(South Korea) K. J. Choi (Spain) Sergio García	6,200,000	1,116,000	
2013	(United States) Ken Duke	268	−12	Playoff	(United States) Chris Stroud	6,100,000	1,098,000	
2012	(Australia) Marc Leishman	266	−14	1 stroke	(United States) Charley Hoffman (United States) Bubba Watson	6,000,000	1,080,000	
2011	(Sweden) Freddie Jacobson	260	−20	1 stroke	(United States) Ryan Moore (United States) John Rollins	6,000,000	1,080,000	
2010	(United States) Bubba Watson	266	−14	Playoff	(United States) Corey Pavin (United States) Scott Verplank	6,000,000	1,080,000	
2009	(United States) Kenny Perry	258	−22	3 strokes	(United States) Paul Goydos (United States) David Toms	6,000,000	1,080,000	
2008	(United States) Stewart Cink (2)	262	−18	1 stroke	(United States) Tommy Armour III (United States) Hunter Mahan	6,000,000	1,080,000	
2007	(United States) Hunter Mahan	265	−15	Playoff	(United States) Jay Williamson	6,000,000	1,080,000	
Buick Championship
2006	(United States) J. J. Henry	266	−14	3 strokes	(United States) Hunter Mahan (United States) Ryan Moore	4,400,000	792,000	
2005	(United States) Brad Faxon	266	−14	Playoff	(South Africa) Tjaart van der Walt	4,300,000	774,000	
2004	(United States) Woody Austin	270	−10	Playoff	(United States) Tim Herron	4,200,000	756,000	
Greater Hartford Open
2003	(United States) Peter Jacobsen (2)	266	−14	2 strokes	(United States) Chris Riley	4,000,000	720,000	
Canon Greater Hartford Open
2002	(United States) Phil Mickelson (2)	266	−14	1 stroke	(United States) Jonathan Kaye (United States) Davis Love III	4,000,000	720,000	
2001	(United States) Phil Mickelson	264	−16	1 stroke	(United States) Billy Andrade	3,100,000	558,000	
2000	(United States) Notah Begay III	260	−20	1 stroke	(United States) Mark Calcavecchia	2,800,000	504,000	
1999	(United States) Brent Geiberger	262	−18	3 strokes	(United States) Skip Kendall	2,500,000	450,000	
1998	(United States) Olin Browne	266	−14	Playoff	(United States) Stewart Cink (United States) Larry Mize	2,000,000	360,000	
1997	(United States) Stewart Cink	267	−13	1 stroke	(United States) Tom Byrum (United States) Brandel Chamblee (United States) Jeff Maggert	1,500,000	270,000	
1996	(United States) D. A. Weibring	270	−10	4 strokes	(United States) Tom Kite	1,500,000	270,000	
1995	(Australia) Greg Norman	267	−13	2 strokes	(United States) Dave Stockton Jr. (United States) Kirk Triplett (New Zealand) Grant Waite	1,200,000	216,000	
1994	(South Africa) David Frost	268	−12	1 stroke	(Australia) Greg Norman	1,200,000	216,000	
1993	(Zimbabwe) Nick Price	271	−9	1 stroke	(United States) Dan Forsman (United States) Roger Maltbie	1,000,000	180,000	
1992	(United States) Lanny Wadkins	274	−6	2 strokes	(United States) Dan Forsman (United States) Donnie Hammond (Zimbabwe) Nick Price	1,000,000	180,000	
1991	(United States) Billy Ray Brown	271	−9	Playoff	(United States) Rick Fehr (United States) Corey Pavin	1,000,000	180,000	
1990	(United States) Wayne Levi	267	−13	2 strokes	(United States) Mark Calcavecchia (United States) Brad Fabel (United States) Rocco Mediate (United States) Chris Perry	1,000,000	180,000	
1989	(United States) Paul Azinger (2)	267	−17	1 stroke	(United States) Wayne Levi	1,000,000	180,000	
Canon Sammy Davis Jr.–Greater Hartford Open
1988	(United States) Mark Brooks	269	−15	Playoff	(Canada) Dave Barr (United States) Joey Sindelar	700,000	126,000	
1987	(United States) Paul Azinger	269	−15	1 stroke	(United States) Dan Forsman (United States) Wayne Levi	700,000	126,000	
1986	(United States) Mac O'Grady	269	−15	Playoff	(United States) Roger Maltbie	700,000	126,000	
1985	(United States) Phil Blackmar	271	−13	Playoff	(United States) Jodie Mudd (United States) Dan Pohl	600,000	108,000	
Sammy Davis Jr.-Greater Hartford Open
1984	(United States) Peter Jacobsen	269	−15	2 strokes	(United States) Mark O'Meara	400,000	72,000	
1983	(United States) Curtis Strange	268	−16	1 stroke	(United States) Jay Haas (United States) Jack Renner	300,000	54,000	
1982	(United States) Tim Norris	259	−25	6 strokes	(United States) Raymond Floyd (United States) Hubert Green	300,000	54,000	
1981	(United States) Hubert Green	264	−20	1 stroke	(United States) Bobby Clampett (United States) Fred Couples (United States) Roger Maltbie	300,000	54,000	
1980	(United States) Howard Twitty	266	−18	Playoff	(United States) Jim Simons	300,000	54,000	
1979	(United States) Jerry McGee	267	−17	1 stroke	(United States) Jack Renner	300,000	54,000	
1978	(United States) Rod Funseth	264	−20	4 strokes	(United States) Dale Douglass (United States) Lee Elder (United States) Billy Kratzert	210,000	42,000	
1977	(United States) Billy Kratzert	265	−19	3 strokes	(United States) Grier Jones (United States) Larry Nelson	210,000	42,000	
1976	(United States) Rik Massengale	266	−18	2 strokes	(United States) Al Geiberger (United States) J. C. Snead	210,000	42,000	
1975	(United States) Don Bies	267	−17	Playoff	(United States) Hubert Green	200,000	40,000	
1974	(United States) Dave Stockton	268	−16	4 strokes	(United States) Raymond Floyd	200,000	40,000	
1973	(United States) Billy Casper (4)	264	−20	1 stroke	(Australia) Bruce Devlin	200,000	40,000	
Greater Hartford Open Invitational
1972	(United States) Lee Trevino	269	−15	Playoff	(United States) Lee Elder	125,000	25,000	
1971	(United States) George Archer	268	−16	Playoff	(United States) Lou Graham (United States) J. C. Snead	110,000	22,000	
1970	(United States) Bob Murphy	267	−17	4 strokes	(United States) Paul Harney	100,000	20,000	
1969	(United States) Bob Lunn	268	−16	Playoff	(United States) Dave Hill	100,000	20,000	
1968	(United States) Billy Casper (3)	266	−18	3 strokes	(Australia) Bruce Crampton	100,000	20,000	
1967	(United States) Charlie Sifford	272	−12	1 stroke	(United States) Steve Oppermann	100,000	20,000	
Insurance City Open Invitational
1966	(United States) Art Wall Jr.	266	−18	2 strokes	(United States) Wes Ellis	100,000	20,000	
1965	(United States) Billy Casper (2)	274	−10	Playoff	(United States) Johnny Pott	70,000	11,000	
1964	(United States) Ken Venturi	273	−11	1 stroke	(United States) Al Besselink (United States) Paul Bondeson (United States) Sam Carmichael (United States) Jim Grant	50,000	7,500	
1963	(United States) Billy Casper	271	−13	1 stroke	(United States) George Bayer	40,000	6,400	
1962	(United States) Bob Goalby	271	−13	Playoff	(United States) Art Wall Jr.	35,000	5,300	
1961	(United States) Billy Maxwell	271	−13	Playoff	(United States) Ted Kroll	30,000	4,300	
1960	(United States) Arnold Palmer (2)	270	−14	Playoff	(United States) Bill Collins (United States) Jack Fleck	30,000	3,500	
1959	(United States) Gene Littler	272	−12	1 stroke	(United States) Tom Nieporte	25,000	3,500	
1958	(United States) Jack Burke Jr.	268	−16	3 strokes	(United States) Dow Finsterwald (United States) Art Wall Jr.	25,000	3,500	
1957	(United States) Gardner Dickinson	272	−12	2 strokes	(United States) George Bayer	22,000	2,800	
Insurance City Open
1956	(United States) Arnold Palmer	274	−10	Playoff	(United States) Ted Kroll	20,000	4,000	
1955	(United States) Sam Snead	269	−15	7 strokes	(United States) Fred Hawkins (United States) Mike Souchak	20,000	4,000	
1954	(United States) Tommy Bolt	271	−13	Playoff	(United States) Earl Stewart	15,000	2,500	
1953	(United States) Bob Toski	269	−15	1 stroke	(Australia) Jim Ferrier	15,000	2,400	
1952	(United States) Ted Kroll	273	−11	4 strokes	(United States) Lawson Little (United States) Skee Riegel (United States) Earl Stewart	15,000	2,400	

Note: Green highlight indicates scoring records.

== Highlights ==
- 1952: Ted Kroll wins the inaugural tournament. He beats Lawson Little, Skee Riegel, and Earl Stewart by four shots.
- 1955: Amateur Bill Whedon becomes the first player in PGA Tour history to record two holes-in-one in the same round.
- 1956: Arnold Palmer makes the Insurance City Open his first United States based PGA Tour victory by beating Ted Kroll in a playoff. Afterwards Palmer said "Ted is a great guy—he even gave me the putter that beat him."
- 1962: Bob Goalby defeats Art Wall Jr. on the seventh hole of a sudden death playoff after Wall misses an 18-inch putt for par on the 72nd hole.
- 1967: African American golfer Charlie Sifford wins his first PGA Tour event. He beats Steve Oppermann by one shot.
- 1968: Billy Casper becomes the tournament's first three-time winner. He beats Bruce Crampton by three shots.
- 1972: Lee Trevino defeats Lee Elder in a sudden death playoff. If Elder had won, he would have become qualified for The Masters.
- 1973: Billy Casper shoots a final round 64 to win for the fourth time at Hartford. He beats Bruce Devlin by one shot.
- 1974: Dave Stockton wins by four shots over Raymond Floyd. After the tournament, Stockton gets a congratulatory call from then President Gerald Ford. Stockton also arranges to donate his entire $40,000 winnings check to charity.
- 1977: Billy Kratzert beats Grier Jones and Larry Nelson by three shots. Two years earlier, Kratzert had quit golf and gone to work as a forklift operator.
- 1981: Ninety-one players made the 36-hole cut, a PGA Tour record.
- 1982: Tim Norris sets tournament records for aggregate (259) scoring and under par (−25) as he wins by six shots over Hubert Green and Raymond Floyd.
- 1986: Mac O'Grady shoots a final round 62 to catch Roger Maltbie, then defeats him on the first hole of sudden death.
- 1989: Paul Azinger chips it in on the 72nd hole to beat Wayne Levi by one shot.
- 1992: Lanny Wadkins, who had last played in Hartford in 1978, shoots a final round 65 to win by two shots over Dan Forsman, Nick Price, and Donnie Hammond.
- 2000: Notah Begay III wins for the second week in succession after he makes birdie on the 72nd hole to edge Mark Calcavecchia by one shot.
- 2002: Phil Mickelson becomes the first winner to successfully defend his title. He beats Jonathan Kaye and Davis Love III by one shot.
- 2003: Nineteen years after his first triumph in Hartford, Peter Jacobsen wins again, beating Chris Riley. Jacobsen's $720,000 winner's check was ten times what he earned in 1984. The tournament was also notable when Suzy Whaley became the first woman in 58 years to play in a PGA Tour event, though her appearance was controversial after playing from shorter tees during her qualifying tournament, the Connecticut PGA Championship.
- 2011: Patrick Cantlay, an amateur golfer from UCLA, set a course-record of 10-under 60, the lowest round ever shot on the PGA Tour by an amateur.
- 2014: Kevin Streelman birdies the last seven holes in the final round, a PGA Tour record for an event winner.
- 2016: Jim Furyk shot a 12-under-par 58 in the final round, becoming the first player to shoot 58 in a PGA Tour event.
- 2017: Jordan Spieth wins in a playoff against Daniel Berger by holing his bunker shot for birdie on the first playoff hole. Berger had a chance to advance the playoff, but missed his long birdie putt.
- 2021: Harris English wins a sudden-death playoff against Kramer Hickok on the 8th hole, a playoff which tied for the second longest sudden-death playoff in PGA Tour history.
- 2024: In the third round, Cameron Young shot a 59, making the Travelers Championship the first PGA Tour event with multiple sub-60 rounds. In the final round, Scottie Scheffler defeated Tom Kim in a sudden-death playoff, becoming the sixth player in PGA Tour history to win six Tour events before July.
