= Michael Kim =

Michael Kim may refer to:

== Arts and entertainment ==
- Michael Kim (television anchor) (born 1964), American television anchor, 120 Sports host
- Michael Kim (pianist) (born 1968), Canadian pianist, director of the School of Music at University of Minnesota
- Michael Kim (singer) (born 1986), South Korean singer, lead vocalist of R&B group One Way
- Michael J. Kim, podcaster, comedian and actor

== Sports ==
- Michael Kim (footballer) (born 1973), Canadian soccer manager
- Michael Kim (golfer) (born 1993), American golfer
- Mike Kim (poker player)

== Other ==
- Mike Kim (born 1976), North Korea expert, founder of NGO Crossing Borders
- Mike Kim (executive) (born 1983), Korean-American business executive
- Michael Kim (trial lawyer), American trial lawyer, founding partner of Kobre & Kim
- Michael Kim (businessman), billionaire private equity investor, founding partner of MBK Partners
