= TPC River Highlands =

Private golf club in Connecticut

Coordinates: 41.632°N 72.639°W

- Location within the United States Location within Connecticut

Club information
- Location: Cromwell, Connecticut, U.S.
- Elevation: 150 feet (45 m)
- Established: 1928; 98 years ago 1984 (redesign)
- Type: Private
- Operator: PGA Tour TPC Network
- Tota holes: 18
- Tournaments: Travelers Championship
- Greens: Bentgrass / Poa annua
- Fairways: Bentgrass / Poa annua
- Website: Official website
- Designed by: Robert J. Ross and Maurice Kearney (1928), Pete Dye (1982), Bobby Weed (1989)
- Par: 70
- Length: 6,841 yards (6,255 m)
- Course rating: 72.7
- Slope rating: 131
- Course record: 58 – Jim Furyk (2016)

TPC River Highlands is a private golf club located in Cromwell, Connecticut, a suburb south of Hartford. It is part of the Tournament Players Club network operated by the PGA Tour. Since 1984, it has been the venue for the tour's annual Travelers Championship, previously known as the Buick Championship and Greater Hartford Open.

== Former names ==
- Middletown Golf Club (1928–34)
- Edgewood Country Club (1934–84)
- TPC of Connecticut (1984–89)

== History ==
The club was founded in 1928 as Middletown Golf Club and became Edgewood Country Club in 1934. In the early 1980s it was bought by the PGA Tour. The golf course was redesigned to TPC standards by golf course architect Pete Dye, and reopened as the "TPC of Connecticut" in 1984. The course underwent further remodeling in 1989, this time by Bobby Weed in consultation with tour pros Howard Twitty and Roger Maltbie, and renamed the TPC at River Highlands.

== Course record ==
The course record is 58 by PGA Tour pro Jim Furyk, which he shot during the final round of the 2016 Travelers Championship. A plaque, on the path beside the 18th green, commemorates his achievement, which is also the lowest 18-hole score in PGA Tour history. Previously, the record was held by amateur Patrick Cantlay, a 19-year-old collegian from UCLA, who set the course record of 60 at the Travelers Championship on June 24, 2011.

== Scorecard ==
TPC River Highlands
Tee	Rating/Slope	1	2	3	4	5	6	7	8	9	Out	10	11	12	13	14	15	16	17	18	In	Total
Gold	M: 73.0 / 131	434	341	431	481	223	574	443	202	406	3535	462	158	411	523	421	296	171	420	444	3306	6841
Blue	M: 71.5 / 127	418	311	421	444	212	549	424	194	393	3366	435	149	398	503	413	278	164	407	405	3152	6518
Green	M: 69.6 / 126	418	311	380	398	179	549	385	167	393	3180	383	149	398	503	384	278	164	334	373	2966	6146
White	M: 68.7 / 124 W: 74.7 / 137	406	263	380	398	179	523	385	167	357	3058	383	126	358	470	384	247	140	334	373	2815	5873
Red	W: 69.6 / 122	280	213	284	344	123	482	322	116	329	2493	338	103	319	431	305	226	86	249	321	2378	4871
Par		4	4	4	4	3	5	4	3	4	35	4	3	4	5	4	4	3	4	4	35	70
SI	Men/Women	3/13	13/11	11/9	5/3	17/15	1	7/5	9/17	15/7		4/6	18	8	6/2	12/10	16	14	2/4	10/12
Forward	M: 56.2 / 94 W: 59.2 / 102	216	116	200	203	123	250	227	105	202	1642	193	97	215	266	150	151	80	214	218	1584	3226
