= Golf in China =

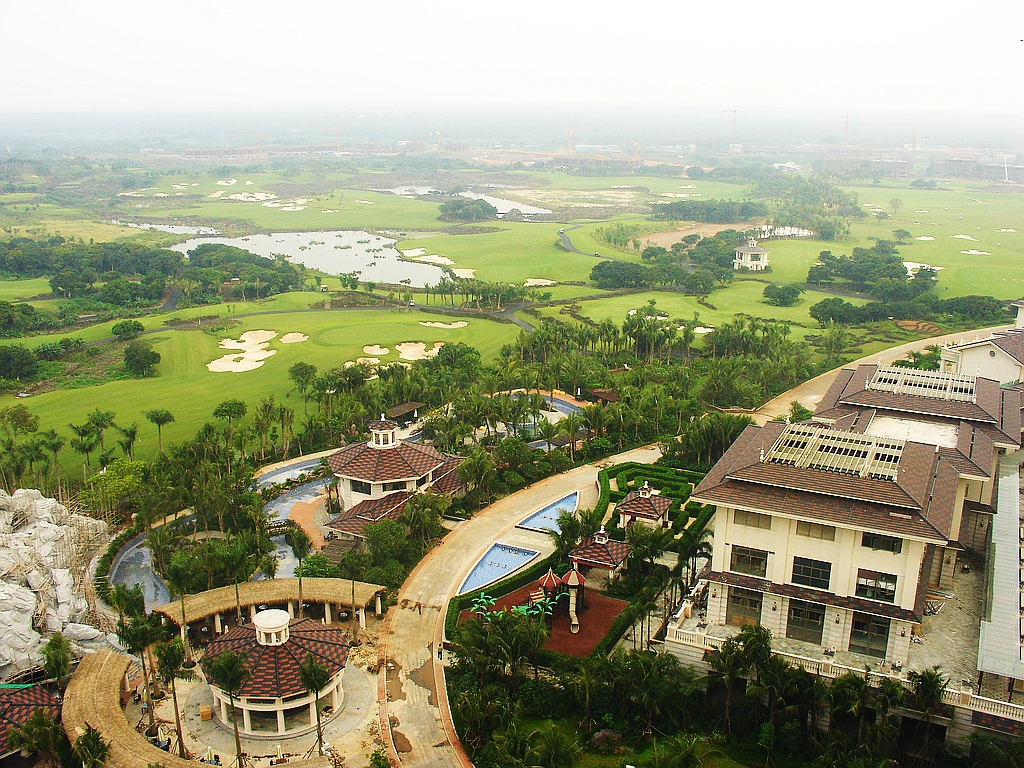
Mission Hills Haikou in Hainan Province is a large golf resort

Golf in China is a growing industry, with numerous golf courses being established, especially in the province of Hainan. In 2011, there were around 358,000 core players (aged over 18 and play more than 8 rounds a year) among the Chinese population, with a growth rate of 7.5%, and that figure was projected to grow to about 20 million by 2020. For the general public, golf is considered to be prohibitively expensive. However, it is seen as the top recreational sport for businesspeople and officials.

The sport attracts both foreign investment and overseas golfers, who come from such countries as South Korea, Australia, and Japan for the relatively inexpensive fees.

China holds such tournaments as the WGC-HSBC Champions in Shanghai, TCL Classic and Blue Bay LPGA on Hainan Island, the Volvo China Open and the BMW Asian Open.

Among the country's most successful golfers are Zhang Lianwei and Liang Wenchong.

== History ==
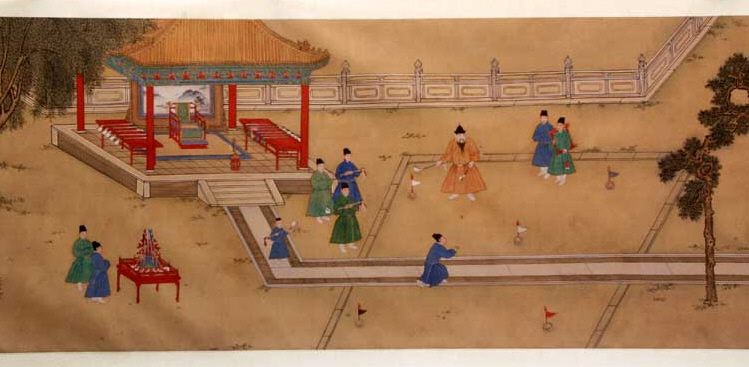
The Xuande Emperor playing a game that looks like golf, called chuiwan

Chuiwan, a stick and ball game with some similarities to golf, was played in China as early as 1000 AD, with evidence existing from the Song dynasty.

The sport was banned up until the middle of the 1980s by the Chinese Communist Party as being too bourgeois.

The first golf course constructed in China opened in 1984. It was the Chung Shan Hot Springs in Zhongshan, based on a design by Arnold Palmer.

The first international tournament held in China was the 1995 World Cup at Mission Hills in Guangdong province.

China's first regularly scheduled tournament was the 2004 BMW Asian Open. In 2005, the Volvo China Open was held in China, followed by the HSBC Champions in 2006.

Despite a ban in 2004 that limits the number of golf courses in China due to environmental impact concerns, the number has more than tripled since 2004. At that time, only 170 courses existed. By 2009 there were almost 600. Around 2008, growth rate of the golf industry is 25 to 30 percent per year. In 2011, the rate was moderated by a much larger base, decreased to 7.5% (45 new courses). The number of courses rose further to 683 by January 2017, when the government ordered 111 of them closed due to water and land conservation concerns. At that time, all of China's province-level divisions except Tibet had at least one course in operation.

At the 2007 National People's Congress, acknowledging that the construction of new golf courses is not only a waste of public money, but also an illegal use of space, Premier Wen Jiabao said to the Congress that contracts in building new golf courses should be highly discouraged. The government currently imposes a 24 percent tax on golf clubs. In October 2015, the Chinese Communist Party banned all its members from joining golf clubs among other displays of extravagance as part of China's anti-corruption campaign. Several months later, the party clarified its position in an editorial in China Daily, stating that party members were not to accept free memberships or rounds.

== Customer costs ==
Green fees and memberships in China are often expensive relative to developed nations. Average green fees for non-members are usually at least US$100, and often far more expensive. For example, at the Tomson Shanghai Pudong Golf Club, home to the BMW Asian Open on the European Tour, the initiation fee is $170,000 with an additional $1,800 per year. Condos sell for $22 million. The green fee for guest golfers is $125 plus caddie on weekdays, and $180 plus caddie on weekends. At that particular club, however, out of the 700 members, 300 are from overseas. At Shanghai's Sheshan International Golf Club, where tournaments such as the HSBC Champions is played, the initiation fee is $230,000.

== Clubs and courses ==
There are currently about 500 golf courses in the country, the first of which was constructed in 1984. Mission Hills is one of the leading firms, owning courses around the country. Its Mission Hills Golf Club near Shenzhen has 12 courses, making it the world's largest golfing complex.

Club or course name	Province	Year opened	Holes	Notes
Hong Kong Golf Club	Hong Kong	1889	63	
Mission Hills Shenzhen	Shenzhen	1992	216	With twelve courses, it was the world's largest golf facility in 2004
Mission Hills Haikou	Hainan		180	When fully built out, the resort will have 22 courses (396 holes).
Sheshan Golf Club	Shanghai			
Yalong Bay Golf Club	Hainan			
Caesars Macau	Macau			Formerly owned by Caesars Entertainment Corporation

== Competitions and tournaments ==
Tournament	Established	Final year	Prize fund	Notes
World Cup	1953		US$7,500,000	First held in China in 1995; China hosted from 2007 to 2011.
Pine Valley Beijing Open	2007	2008	US$1,200,000	Asian Tour and Japan Golf Tour
BMW Asian Open	2001	2008	US$2,300,000	Asian Tour and European Tour
Grand China Air LPGA	2007	2008	$1,800,000	LPGA Tour
Luxehills Chengdu Open	2008	2010	US$1,000,000	Omega China Tour and OneAsia Tour
Midea China Classic	2007	2010	US$1,000,000	OneAsia Tour
Mission Hills Star Trophy	2010		US$1,200,000	
Qingdao Golf Open	2008	2008	US$500,000	Challenge Tour
Suzhou Taihu Ladies Open	2008	2013	€350,000	Ladies European Tour and Ladies Asian Golf Tour
TCL Classic	2002	2007	US$1,000,000	Asian Tour and European Tour
Volkswagen Masters-China	2004	2006	US$300,000	Asian Tour
Volvo China Open	1995		RMB20,000,000	European Tour, OneAsia Tour, Asian Tour
WGC-HSBC Champions	2005		US$9,750,000	PGA Tour, European Tour, Asian Tour
Blue Bay LPGA	2014		US$2,200,000	LPGA Tour

== Players ==
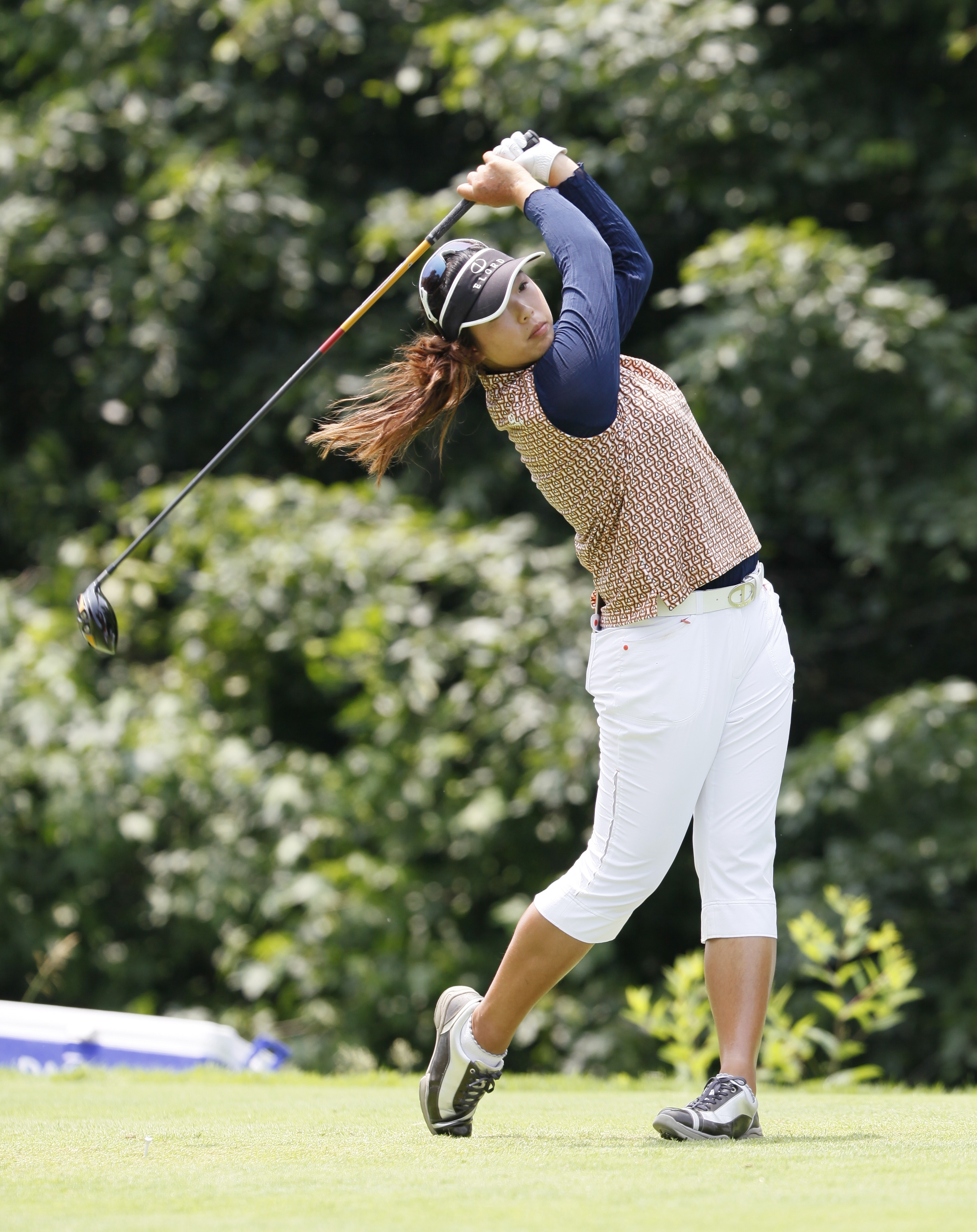
Shanshan Feng during a practice round before the 2009 LPGA Championship, June 10, 2009, Havre de Grace, Maryland.

Numerous world-class players have emerged from China, including:

- Liang Wenchong is one of the top Chinese golfers, and the first to win a top pro event. In 2010, he won the Chengdu Open.
- Shanshan Feng became the first Chinese golfer of either sex to win a major championship when she won the 2012 LPGA Championship.
- Wu Ashun has won three times on the European Tour and represented China at the 2016 Olympic Games.
- Christopher Tsui qualified for the Canadian Tour in 2009
- Zhang Lianwei won 5 Asian Tour events
- Guan Tianlang won the 2012 Asia-Pacific Amateur Championship at age 14, and in the following year's Masters, while still 14, became the youngest player ever to make the cut at a men's major championship.

== By province ==
=== Hainan ===
Hainan is exempt from the nationwide ban on the creation of new golf courses. In the province, the leader in course construction is Mission Hills, having created 10 courses.

==== Mission Hills Haikou golf complex ====
Having been under construction since 2006, the Mission Hills Haikou is a multi-billion dollar project. This 80km² complex (1.5 times the size of Manhattan), opened in 2011, will contain 22 golf courses and luxury hotels when fully built out. It will be one of the largest golf complexes in the world. The resort hosted the World Cup in 2011.

== See also ==
- Sports tourism
- Golf at the Asian Games
