= Tenniel Chu =

Hong Kong Businessman

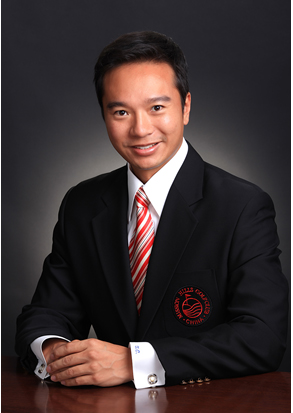
- Tenniel Chu - Vice Chairman of Mission Hills Group
- Born: 1976 (age 49–50); Hong Kong
- Education: University of Toronto (BA)
- Occupation: Entrepreneur
- Known for: Vice Chairman of Mission Hills Group, Secretary-General of OneAsia

Tenniel Chu (born 1976), from Hong Kong, is the Vice Chairman of Mission Hills Group, owner and operator of the Mission Hills golf and leisure resorts in Shenzhen and on the island of Hainan, China.

== Education ==
Tenniel graduated with a degree in economics from the Scarborough campus of the University of Toronto in Canada, then pursued his passion for golf by studying Professional Golf Management at the city’s Humber College. On completing his studies, he worked at US PGA Tour headquarters in Florida before joining the family business in 2001.

== Career ==
Since his appointment as Vice Chairman of Mission Hills Group, Tenniel has played a role in international tournament bids as well as attracting golf’s biggest stars to Mission Hills, beginning with Tiger Woods’ first visit to China in 2001 – and again in 2011 – followed by the Dynasty Cup in 2003 and the Goodwill Trophy in 2005.

Since then, Mission Hills has staged four editions of the World Cup of Golf, three editions of the World Ladies Championship, the 2012 WGC-HSBC Champions, the 2013 “Match at Mission Hills” between Tiger Woods and Rory McIlroy, and three editions of the World Celebrity Pro-Am, a ground-breaking event for Asia featuring elite male and female golfers together with stars from entertainment and sports.

Tenniel has overseen Mission Hills’ emphasis on junior golf development which created the Mission Hills Golf Series Junior tour in January 2010 - an event that has won praise from many golfing experts including Tiger Woods and Rory McIlroy. In 2014, the club staged 43 junior tournaments, including signature annual events hosted by Jack Nicklaus, Sir Nick Faldo and Annika Sörenstam.

Tenniel is also Deputy Commissioner of OneAsia, Vice Chairman of the China Golf Association, President of the Guangdong Golf Association and President of the Shenzhen Golf Association.

In addition, he is founding Chairman of the China Chapter of the International Association of Golf Tour Operators, and the first Chinese national to be admitted as a member of the R&A.

Tenniel’s golf achievements were given formal recognition in October 2014 when – for the second year in a row – he and his brother, Dr Ken Chu (businessman), the Mission Hills Chairman and CEO, were named the “Most Powerful People in Asian Golf” by Golf Inc. The brothers were also named in the Top 10 in the magazine’s global ranking.

== Mission Hills ==
Mission Hills Shenzhen-Dongguan, which contains 12 golf courses, is recognised by Guinness World Records as the world's largest golf facility, and Mission Hills Haikou, which features 10 courses, is also the world’s largest spa resort. Mission Hills Group currently encompasses businesses in golf management, real estate, commercial retail development, residential development, wellness, education and theme parks.

The company is expanding facilities to include hotel brands, major tourist attractions, retail developments, entertainment districts, office space and residential accommodation. It is also in the process of developing new resorts at other locations across China.

== Philanthropy ==
Tenniel Chu is an active member of the Hong Kong and Mainland China Aid Organization and social services such as the United Nations Charity Golf event, the Golfers “5.12 Fund Raising Golf Campaign” - recognised by the Guinness World Records as the largest single-day golf tournament of the world ever.

Due to his contribution to the sports of China, Tenniel has been a torch-bearer for both Beijing 2008 Olympics and Shenzhen 2011 Universiade. He is also a member of the Shenzhen Chinese People's Political Consultative Conference.

== Recognition and awards ==
- The Arbor Award by University of Toronto, Canada
