= Tycoon Talk =

Hong Kong television series

Tycoon Talk is a business celebrity talk show broadcast on Hong Kong's TVB Pearl by film producer / host Sean Lee-Davies. He directed and hosted two eight-episode series featuring Hong Kong's most recognized billionaires, business leaders, and entrepreneurs. In the series, Lee-Davies gains access to their work environments, as well as, their private lives. In one episode, he challenges American businessman James E. Thompson to a push-up challenge; plays pool with Bruce Rockowitz, co-founder of Pure; and challenges the CEO of Mission Hills Golf Dr. Ken Chu to a round. In addition, he accompanied Tai Sang Bank Director Philip Ma on a helicopter ride around Hong Kong island; and went for a drive with tycoon Sir Gordon Wu in a Nissan Leaf car.

Tycoon Talk was broadcast in 2014 from August 7 to September 25, every Thursday from 21:30 to 10:00 on TVB Pearl. Tycoon Talk Series 2: The Next Generation was broadcast in 2015.

== Episodes ==
Episode	Date of Broadcast	Guest	Title	Field
01	7 August 2014	Sir Gordon Wu，GBS，KCMG，FICE	Chairman of Hopewell Holdings Ltd	Property and Infrastructure
02	14 August 2014	Bruce Rockowitz	Executive Director of Li & Fung (Trading) Ltd	Principal Operating Subsidiary of the Li & Fung Group
03	21 August 2014	James E. Thompson, GBS	Founder, chairman and Chief Executive of The Crown Worldwide Group	Transportation, Relocation services, Logistics and Storage services
04	28 August 2014	Dr. Ken Chu	Chairman and CEO for Mission Hills Group	Golf and Hospitality
05	4 September 2014	Allan Zeman，GBM，GBS，JP	Chairman of Lan Kwai Fong Concepts Holdings Ltd.	Entertainment and Property
06	11 September 2014	Michael Tien，BBS，JP	Founder and Chairman of G2000	Fashion and Retail
07	18 September 2014	Philip Ma	Director of Tai Sang Bank	Property and Bank
08	25 September 2014	Francis Lui	Vice Chairman of Galaxy Entertainment Group Limited	Entertainment and Hospitality
