= Golfing Greats: In Their Own Words =

Malaysian golf interview series

Golfing Greats: In Their Own Words is a 26-part golf interview series on The Golf Channel in Malaysia and Singapore, produced by the Malaysian network Astro.

Presented by Jason Dasey who also conducts the interviews, the series features a different golfer each episode who talks about his or her career in a 30-minute program, usually shot somewhere in Asia. As well as discussing their career highlights, the players pinpoint their biggest influences and some of the incidents away from the fairways that shaped their approach to life. The series airs on The Golf Channel and in high definition on Astro SuperSport HD 2 (Channel 833).

== Players ==
- Greg Norman - Interviewed in July 2009, aired in November 2009.
- Mark O'Meara - Interviewed in November 2009, aired in January 2010.
- Rory McIlroy - Interviewed in November 2009, aired in February 2010.
- Nick Faldo - Interviewed in March 2010, aired in June 2010
- Darren Clarke - Interviewed in March 2010, aired in July 2010
- Martin Kaymer - Interviewed in April 2011, aired in September 2011
- Louis Oosthuizen - Interviewed in April 2011, aired in September 2011
- Vijay Singh - Interviewed in October 2011, aired in December 2011
- Jeev Milkha Singh - Interviewed in November 2011, aired in January 2012
- Pádraig Harrington - Interviewed in November 2011, aired in January 2012
- Colin Montgomerie - Interviewed in November 2011, aired in January 2012
- Ian Poulter - Interviewed in November 2011, aired in January 2012
- José María Olazábal - Interviewed in November 2011, aired in January 2012
- Jason Dufner - Interviewed in October 2012, aired in December 2012
- Trevor Immelman - Interviewed in October 2012, to aired in December 2012
- Michael Campbell - Interviewed in November 2012, aired in December 2012
- Thomas Bjørn - Interviewed in November 2012, aired in December 2012
- Sergio García - Interviewed in December 2012, aired in January 2013
- Ernie Els - Interviewed in December 2012, aired in January 2013
- Charl Schwartzel - Interviewed in March 2013, aired in May 2013
- Bubba Watson - Interviewed in October 2013, aired in December 2013
- Keegan Bradley - Interviewed in October 2013, aired in December 2013
- Edoardo Molinari - Interviewed in December 2013, aired in December 2013
- Graeme McDowell - Interviewed in March 2014, aired in June 2014
- Thongchai Jaidee - Interviewed in March 2014, aired in June 2014
- Lee Westwood - Interviewed in April 2014, aired in June 2014

== Trivia ==
- The program featuring Greg Norman was filmed at Mission Hills Golf Club in China during a July 2009 visit with his former wife Chris Evert. A lengthy joint interview with Norman and Evert had to be deleted from the final version when the two announced their separation and subsequent divorce in December 2009.
- Mission Hills Golf Club was also the venue for the special with Rory McIlroy and featured an interview with 2010 U.S. Open Golf Champion, Graeme McDowell who partnered McIlroy for the Ireland team in the 2009 World Cup (men's golf), finishing runners-up.
- Rory McIlroy, Darren Clarke and Jason Dufner became Major winners after their interviews in the series. McIlroy won the U.S. Open in 2011 while Clarke was a 125-1 outsider when he claimed the 2011 Open Championship while Dufner claimed the 2013 PGA Championship. Another player to claim a Major after first appearing in the series was Graeme McDowell the winner of the U.S. Open in June 2010. He was briefly interviewed in the McIlroy episode in 2010 but would get his own episode four years later.
- Both Martin Kaymer and Louis Oosthuizen were interviewed before the Maybank Malaysian Open a few days after missing the cut at the 2011 Masters Tournament.
- The interview with Vijay Singh was conducted at the CIMB Classic on the Fijian's first trip to Malaysia in more than a decade: the nation where he worked as a club pro in the 1980s.
- Ian Poulter was interviewed before a North Asian sales' seminar at Hong Kong's JW Marriott Hotel for his clothing brand, IJP Design and displayed a prominent shaving cut, suffered early that morning.
- The interview with José María Olazábal took place at a horse race meeting at Hong Kong Jockey Club before the 2011 Hong Kong Open.
- After a few minutes of the interview with Pádraig Harrington in Malaysia, an over-zealous PR rep tried to wrap things up. "This is good stuff," replied Harrington and the interview continued. The comment was used in the promo for the series in December 2011.
- The interview with Michael Campbell was shot twice because of technical problems - at the 2012 Maybank Malaysian Open and then at the 2012 Barclays Singapore Open. But in the seven months between the two interviews, Campbell had changed countries of residence from Switzerland to Spain - and re-found his form.
- When Trevor Immelman was being interviewed at CIMB Classic, Jason Dufner arrived early for his interview and you could feel the tension in the air. The pair were fierce youth amateur rivals in the 1990s.
- Thomas Bjørn had been scheduled to be interviewed at the 2011 Barclays Singapore Open, but a scheduling conflict prevented it from happening. The interview was finally executed at the 2012 Barclays Singapore Open.
- In his programme in the series, Ernie Els focused exclusively on his four Major tournament victories. The interview was conducted in December 2012, five months after claiming his second Claret Jug with victory at the 2012 Open Championship.
- The interview with Sergio García at the Iskandar Johor Open was on his first ever visit to Malaysia. He went on to win the tournament after shooting an 11-under-par 61 in the final round of a rain-shortened event.
- Before the interview with Charl Schwartzel, the 2011 Masters Champion was playing in a Pro Am tournament with the Queen of Malaysia
- Thongchai Jaidee captained Team Asia to a thrilling 10–10 tie at the Eurasia Cup in 2014, defeating Graeme McDowell in the final day singles to spark a comeback after the Ulterman had been interviewed in the series on the same day before the competition
- After his interview in Kuala Lumpur Lee Westwood would go on to win the 2014 Maybank Malaysian Open by 7 shots
