= Mission Hills Star Trophy =

Tournament information
- Location: Mission Hills Haikou, Hainan, China
- Established: 2010
- Course: Blackstone
- Par: 73
- Length: 7,808
- Format: 36-hole individual stroke play
- Prize fund: $1,200,000

Current champion
- Ryuji Imada

The Mission Hills Star Trophy is an annual, pro-celebrity golf tournament held in Hainan, China.

It has the largest individual prize purse of any golf tournament in Asia Pacific.

== 2010 inaugural tournament ==
This inaugural event was held between October 28–31, 2010. Japanese golfer Ryuji Imada won.

=== Notable entrants ===
==== Professional ====
- Akashiya Sanma
- Greg Norman
- Sir Nick Faldo
- Zhang Lian-wei
- Colin Montgomerie
- Hank Haney
- Ryuji Imada
- Lorena Ochoa
- Annika Sörenstam
- Se Ri Pak
- Candie Kung
- Belén Mozo
- Rosie Jones

==== Celebrity ====
- Catherine Zeta-Jones
- Michael Phelps
- Hugh Grant
- Matthew McConaughey
- Christian Slater
- Li Ning
- Akashiya Sanma
- Ruud Gullit
- Eric Tsang
- Sammo Hung
- Simon Yam
- Michael Wong

== See also ==
- Mission Hills Golf Club
- World Cup (men's golf)
