= Ken Chu (businessman) =

Hong Kong businessman (born 1974)

Ken Chu BBS LL.D. JP
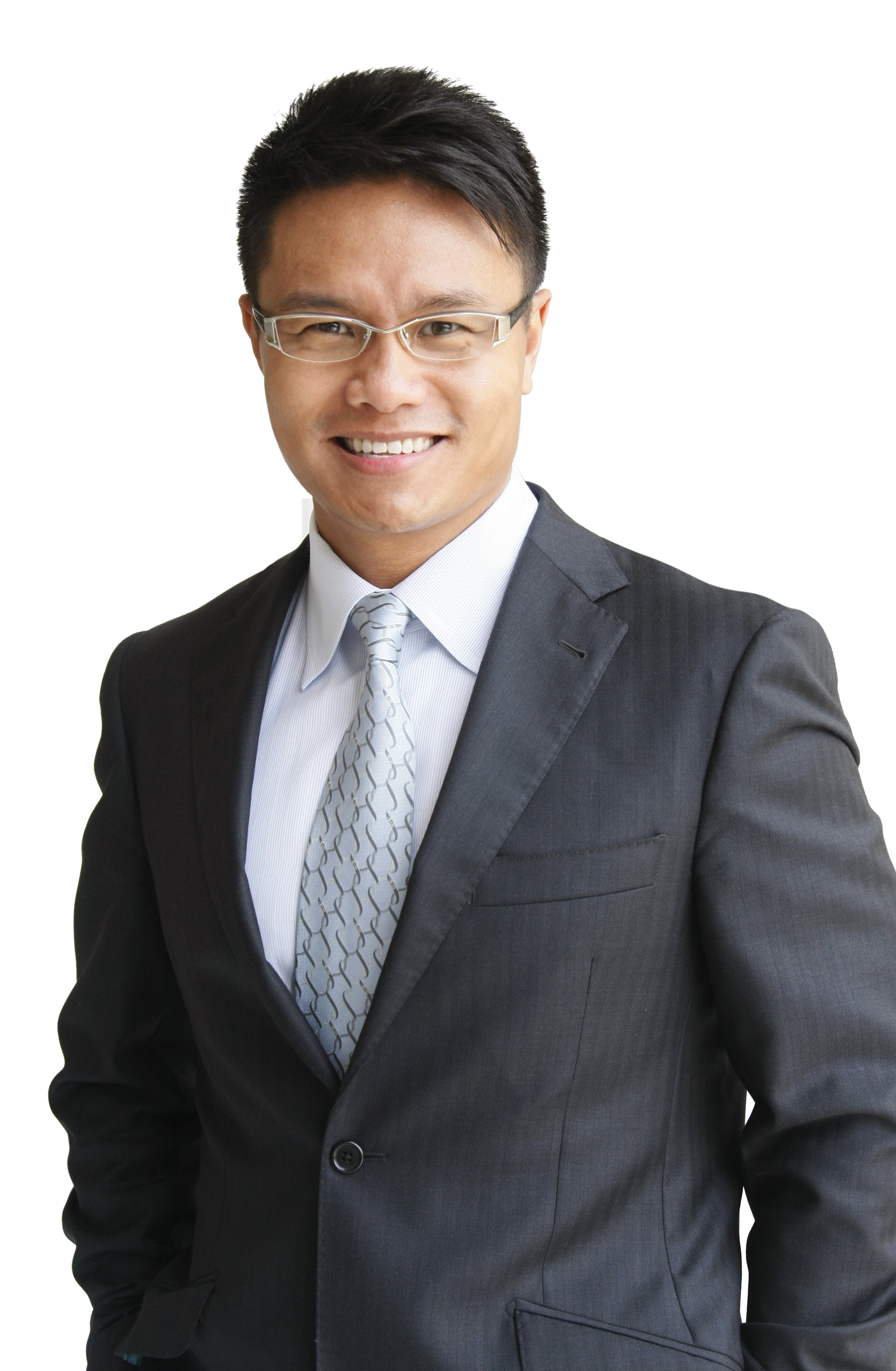
- Born: 1974 (age 51–52); Hong Kong
- Education: Western University, Bus. Adm., Doctor of Law (Hon)
- Occupation: Entrepreneur
- Known for: CEO and Chairman of Mission Hills Group; Global Member of the World Travel and Tourism Council (WTTC); National Committee Member of Chinese People's Political Consultative Conference (CPPCC)

Chinese name
- Traditional Chinese: 朱鼎健
- Simplified Chinese: 朱鼎健
Transcriptions

Ken Chu (born 1974 in Hong Kong) is the chairman and CEO of the Mission Hills Group, a Chinese company that operates golf resorts.

== Education ==
Chu earned a bachelor's degree in Business Administration from the University of Western Ontario in Canada. He is also the youngest person to receive an Honorary Doctorate of Law Degree for his contribution to sports, leisure developments and community services in Hong Kong and China.

== Career ==
After completion of his studies, Chu joined his father David Chu's company Mission Hills Group in 1995. He has led his company to turn the uninhabited periphery of Shenzhen and Dongguan into a golf resort with twelve golf courses designed by top professional golf players, three golf clubhouses, three spa centers, two five-star hotels, two golf academies and one country club with Asia's largest tennis facility (fifty-one tennis courts) and one tennis academy. Guinness World Records listed Mission Hills Golf Club as the "World’s Largest Golf Club" in 2004. It was also recognized as a 5A Level Tourist Attraction by CNTA (China National Tourism Administration).

In 2008, Chu planned and executed a project with Chinese Government policymakers on Hainan Island, known as Mission Hills Haikou. Mission Hills Haikou opened to the public in 2010 with ten golf courses, each incorporating the native lava rock formations, one 518-room five-star hotel, one golf clubhouse, one golf academy, Hainan's only aquatic theme park with 168-pool volcanic mineral springs and one spa center. The Guinness World Records listed Mission Hills Haikou as the "World's Largest Spa & Mineral Springs".

The Chu has brought more than one hundred international tournaments to China. He has also introduced the "golf and more" leisure philosophy to Mission Hills' expanding tourism-related businesses. The group's latest development projects include the 500,000-square-metre (5,400,000 sq ft) Mission Hills Centreville and the 330,000-square-metre (3,600,000 sq ft) Mission Hills Lan Kwai Fong – Haikou. These projects feature international hotel brands, such as Ritz Carlton, Renaissance Hotel and Hard Rock Hotel; integrated shopping, entertainment and leisure centers; trendy restaurants, cafes and bars; IMAX cinemas; ice skating rinks; bowling alleys; simulation racing centers; auto showrooms and conference facilities.

The Mission Hills – Huayi Brothers – Feng Xiaogang Movie Town which opened to the public on 7 June 2014 in Haikou is a joint venture between Mission Hills, the Chinese film production company, Huayi Brothers and the Chinese film director, Feng Xiaogang. It is a 930,000-square-metre (10,000,000 sq ft) themed town that features six professional movie studios and a variety of dining, entertainment, shopping, cinema, cafe, bar and hotel facilities.

Mission Hills Group also entered into partnerships with the NBA (National Basketball Association) and FC Barcelona (FCB), creating the largest basketball academy operated by the NBA, complemented by interactive museum experiences, and the Barça Academy Pro in Haikou will be the first overseas FCB football school directly managed by FCB and staffed by FCB coaches. The NBA Basketball School – Mission Hills Haikou will open to male and female players, from junior level to professionals; NBA players and legends will visit the school to provide additional instruction and training to young players.

Together with his brother Tenniel Chu, Ken Chu has been named Asia's Most Powerful People in Golf for seven years running by Asian Golf. The Chu brothers have topped this Asia's Power Hitters list since 2014.

== Public and community service appointments ==
In addition to his duties with Mission Hills, Chu is also a Global Member of the World Travel and Tourism Council (WTTC), the preeminent forum for global business leaders in travel and tourism industry, and currently serves as National Committee Member of Chinese People's Political Consultative Conference (CPPCC). as well as other appointments, including:

- Standing Committee Member of All-China Youth Federation (ACYF)
- Vice Chairman of China Association of Enterprises with Foreign Investment
- Vice Chairman of Chinese Enterprise Sports Association
- Chairman of China Sportsman (Hong Kong) Union
- Permanent Honorary President of Friends of Hong Kong Association
- Permanent Honorary President of Hong Kong Industry, Commerce & Professional Association
- Honorary Chairman of Hong Kong United Youth Association
- Standing Committee Member of CPPCC Hainan Provincial Committee
- Western University International Advisory Board Member
