= 2011 World Cup (men's golf) =

Coordinates: 19.905375°N 110.310699°E

Tournament information
- Dates: 24–27 November
- Location: Haikou, Hainan Island, China
- Courses: Mission Hills Haikou, Blackstone course
- Format: 72 holes stroke play best ball & alternate shot

Statistics
- Par: 72
- Length: 7,441 yards (6,804 m)
- Field: 28 two-man teams
- Cut: None
- Prize fund: US$7.5 million
- Winner's share: US$2.4 million

Champion
- United States; Matt Kuchar & Gary Woodland
- 264 (−24)

The 2011 Omega Mission Hills World Cup was a golf tournament that took place 24–27 November on the Blackstone course at Mission Hills Haikou in Hainan, China. It was the 56th World Cup, and the first since 2009, when the tournament switched to being staged biennially. 28 countries competed as two player teams. The purse was increased from $5.5 million in 2009 to $7.5 million in 2011. The event was won by the United States, represented by Matt Kuchar and Gary Woodland with a score of 264, 24 under par.

== Qualification and format ==
The leading 18 available players from different countries in the Official World Golf Ranking qualified automatically on 18 July. These 18 players then selected a player from their country to compete with them. The person they picked had to be ranked within the top 100 on the Official World Golf Ranking as of 1 September. If there was no other player from that country within the top 100 then the next highest ranked player would be their partner. If there was no other available player from that country within the top 500, then the exempt player could choose whoever he wanted as long as they are a professional from the same country. A further nine countries qualified via three qualifying stages, held in Malaysia, Estonia and Venezuela. The final team was the host nation, China.

The 18 qualifying players (together with their country and World Ranking on 18 July) were Martin Kaymer (Germany, ranked 3), Rory McIlroy (Ireland, 4), Matt Kuchar (USA, 8), Charl Schwartzel (South Africa, 12), Ian Poulter (England, 16), Robert Karlsson (Sweden, 19), Francesco Molinari (Italy, 23), Álvaro Quirós (Spain, 24), Martin Laird (Scotland, 26), Anders Hansen (Denmark, 41), Raphaël Jacquelin (France, 69), Yuta Ikeda (Japan, 70), Brendan Jones (Australia, 73), Nicolas Colsaerts (Belgium, 75), Camilo Villegas (Colombia, 78), Jamie Donaldson (Wales, 98), Thongchai Jaidee (Thailand, 101) and Brendon de Jonge (Zimbabwe, 106). South Korea, Fiji and Argentina would have qualified automatically had their leading players chosen to play.

The event was a 72-hole stroke play team event with each team consisting of two players. The first and third days were fourball play and the second and final days were foursomes play.

== Teams ==
The table below lists the teams together with their World Ranking (if any) at the time of the tournament.

Country	Players	Qualified
Australia	Brendan Jones (81) and Richard Green (88)	OWGR
Austria	Florian Praegant (378) and Roland Steiner (616)	European Qualifier
Belgium	Nicolas Colsaerts (75) and Jérôme Theunis (–)	OWGR
Brazil	Adilson da Silva (376) and Lucas Lee (1037)	South American Qualifier
China	Liang Wenchong (252) and Zhang Xinjun (647)	Host nation
Colombia	Camilo Villegas(79) and Manuel Villegas (1308)	OWGR
Denmark	Anders Hansen (31) and Thorbjørn Olesen (174)	OWGR
England	Ian Poulter (25) and Justin Rose (16)	OWGR
France	Raphaël Jacquelin (100) and Grégory Bourdy (131)	OWGR
Germany	Martin Kaymer (4) and Alex Čejka (314)	OWGR
Guatemala	Pablo Acuña (–) and José Toledo (–)	South American Qualifier
Ireland (Note: This was a combined Republic of Ireland and Northern Ireland team. They competed under the Republic of Ireland flag although both golfers were from Northern Ireland.)	Rory McIlroy (2) and Graeme McDowell (14)	OWGR
Italy	Francesco Molinari (39) and Edoardo Molinari (61)	OWGR
Japan	Yuta Ikeda (73) and Tetsuji Hiratsuka (89)	OWGR
Mexico	José de Jesús Rodríguez (399) and Óscar Serna (934)	South American Qualifier
Netherlands	Joost Luiten (66) and Robert-Jan Derksen (218)	European Qualifier
New Zealand	Gareth Paddison (753) and Michael Hendry (559)	Asian Qualifier
Portugal	Ricardo Santos (266) and Hugo Santos (–)	European Qualifier
Scotland	Martin Laird (42) and Stephen Gallacher (127)	OWGR
Singapore	Mardan Mamat (269) and Lam Chih Bing (793)	Asian Qualifier
South Africa	Charl Schwartzel (13) and Louis Oosthuizen (37)	OWGR
South Korea	Kim Hyung-sung (315) and Park Sung-joon (437)	Asian Qualifier
Spain	Álvaro Quirós (47) and Miguel Ángel Jiménez (40)	OWGR
Sweden	Robert Karlsson (28) and Alex Norén (63)	OWGR
Thailand	Thongchai Jaidee (150) and Kiradech Aphibarnrat (184)	OWGR
United States	Matt Kuchar (10) and Gary Woodland (48)	OWGR
Wales	Jamie Donaldson (83) and Rhys Davies (140)	OWGR
Zimbabwe	Brendon de Jonge (126) and Bruce McDonald (–)	OWGR

The tournament included three pairs of brothers: the Villegas brothers representing Colombia, the Molinari brothers representing Italy and the Santos brothers representing Portugal.

== Result ==
Australia led after the first round with a better-ball score of 61. Ireland and Scotland were in joint second place with 63, followed by The Netherlands and United States with 64.

After the second round foursomes, Australia and Ireland were joint leaders at 131. Scotland were third at 132, followed by Spain, New Zealand and United States at 134.

Ireland led by two shots at the end of the third day with a total of 195 after a better-ball score of 64. Germany, South Africa and United States were tied for second at 197 with Australia fifth at 198. Germany and South Africa had the best scores of the day with 61.

The United States had a last round foursome score of 67 to win by two shots over England and Germany. Ireland had a last round 72 to drop to a tie for fourth place.

Place	Country	Score	To par	Money (US$)
1	United States	64-70-63-67=264	−24	2,400,000
T2	England	66-69-68-63=266	−22	1,025,000
T2	Germany	65-71-61-69=266	−22	1,025,000
T4	Australia	61-70-67-69=267	−21	332,500
T4	Netherlands	64-71-64-68=267	−21	332,500
T4	Ireland	63-68-64-72=267	−21	332,500
T4	Scotland	63-69-69-66=267	−21	332,500
8	Wales	67-69-65-67=268	−20	200,000
T9	Spain	65-69-68-67=269	−19	135,000
T9	South Korea	66-71-64-68=269	−19	135,000
11	Zimbabwe	66-70-67-67=270	−18	105,000
12	South Africa	68-68-61-74=271	−17	96,000
T13	Denmark	65-72-68-67=272	−16	81,000
T13	France	66-70-68-68=272	−16	81,000
T13	Mexico	66-69-65-72=272	−16	81,000
16	New Zealand	66-68-68-71=273	−15	74,000
17	Italy	67-69-64-74=274	−14	72,000
T18	China	68-68-68-71=275	−13	69,000
T18	Thailand	66-70-68-71=275	−13	69,000
T20	Austria	69-72-65-70=276	−12	64,000
T20	Japan	66-70-66-74=276	−12	64,000
T20	Portugal	70-68-66-72=276	−12	64,000
T23	Brazil	68-71-67-72=278	−10	59,000
T23	Colombia	65-76-64-73=278	−10	59,000
25	Sweden	66-74-66-73=279	−9	56,000
26	Singapore	68-75-65-74=282	−6	54,000
27	Guatemala	75-74-66-70=285	−3	52,000
28	Belgium	67-77-68-84=296	+8	50,000

- Source
