= Mission Hills Golf Club =

Chinese golf club

- Interactive map of Mission Hills Golf Club
- 22°47′9″N 114°0′25″E

Club information
- Location: Shenzhen, China
- Established: 1992
- Type: Private
- Owner: Mission Hills Group
- Total holes: 216
- Tournaments: Omega Mission Hills World Cup, Mission Hills Star Trophy, WGC-HSBC Champions
- Website: www.missionhillschina.com

Mission Hills Shenzhen is a twelve-course 18-hole course golf resort, located in the town of Guanlan (觀瀾) in Shenzhen, between the cities of Shenzhen and Dongguan. It is accredited as the world's largest golf facility by the Guinness World Records in 2004, with a size of 40 km^{2} (4,000 ha), surpassing the Pinehurst Resort in the United States. It currently has 11 championship courses and an 18-hole par three course, each designed by a different golf personality. Ken Chu, also known as "Mr. Golf" in China, is the chairman and CEO for Mission Hills Group.

From 2007 through 2009, Mission Hills hosted the Omega Mission Hills World Cup. Scotland won the 2007 event, followed by Sweden in 2008 and Italy in 2009. The contract ran for 12 years; however, Mission Hills' Shenzhen resort no longer hosted the event. The event's organizer, the International Federation of PGA Tours, announced in 2010 that the World Cup would become a biennial event held in odd-numbered years. When the World Cup resumed in 2011, the tournament moved to another property owned by the Mission Hills company, Mission Hills Haikou, located on Hainan Island, a tournament won by the United States.

== Courses ==
(course designer in parentheses)

1. World Cup Course (Jack Nicklaus) United States
2. Norman Course (Greg Norman) Australia
3. Annika Course (Annika Sörenstam) Sweden
4. Els Course (Ernie Els) South Africa
5. Vijay Course (Vijay Singh) Fiji
6. Faldo Course (Nick Faldo) England
7. Olazabal Course (José María Olazábal) Spain
8. Matchplay Course (Ian Poulter - Justin Rose) England
9. Ozaki Course (Masashi Ozaki) Japan
10. Leadbetter Course (David Leadbetter) England
11. Pete Dye Course (Pete Dye) United States
12. Zhang Lianwei Course (Zhang Lian-wei) China (par-3 course)

== Other facilities ==
In addition to golf courses, Mission Hills also features the Mission Hills Spa, Mission Hills Resort, Country Club featuring the largest tennis centre in Asia with 51 courts, including a 3,000-seat stadium court, Mission Hills In Residence, many function Rooms, recreation facilities, Mission Hills Golf Academy, and Mission Hills Golf Academy by Zhang Lianwei, which is 15 km^{2} (5.8 sq mi), with 216 holes, 2 clubhouses (the new Dongguan Clubhouse is 63,000 m^{2} [680,000 sq ft]), 4 spa locations, and a 5-star hotel.

== Mission Hills Centreville ==
Mission Hills Centreville is a large 5 billion RMB (US$793 million) new development located next to the golf courses. Termed a HOPSCA project, meaning Hotel, Offices, Parks, Shopping, Convention and Apartment complex. Built on an area of 500,000 m^{2} (5,400,000 sq ft), it features a 700-room 5-star hotel, IMAX theatre, exhibition halls, 200 retailers, an international school, 1,000 apartment homes and all surrounded by extensive parkland. It is intended to be the first high-end shopping mall in northern Shenzhen. It is expected to open in mid-2013.

== History ==
Mission Hills Golf Club was established in 1992 and 1993 saw the opening of its public driving range. By February 1994, the People's Government of Shenzhen entered into an agreement with the International Golf Association, announcing that Mission Hills Golf Club would be the host venue for the 1995 World Cup of Golf – the first international golf tournament in China. That year, an estimated 30,000 fans lined the fairways to see the United States team of Fred Couples and Davis Love III win its fourth consecutive World Cup title by 14 strokes over Australia (Brett Ogle and Robert Allenby).

Since its inception, Mission Hills Golf Club has hosted over 50 international matches and is regularly visited by dignitaries, royals, celebrities, world business, and political leaders, and top golfers, including Annika Sorenstam, Nick Faldo, Zhang Lianwei, Colin Montgomerie, Retief Goosen and Tiger Woods.

Youth development at Mission Hills includes major grants and scholarships for young Chinese Golf Talents, announced by Chinese 'Mission Hills' and R&A in November 2018.

The vice president of the course is Tenniel Chu.

== Sponsorships ==
Mission Hills Golf Club sponsored the Mission Hills Cup football match between FC Barcelona and a Mission Hills Invitation XI, which was played at the Hong Kong Stadium on 10 August 2007.
