= Golf =

Club-and-ball sport

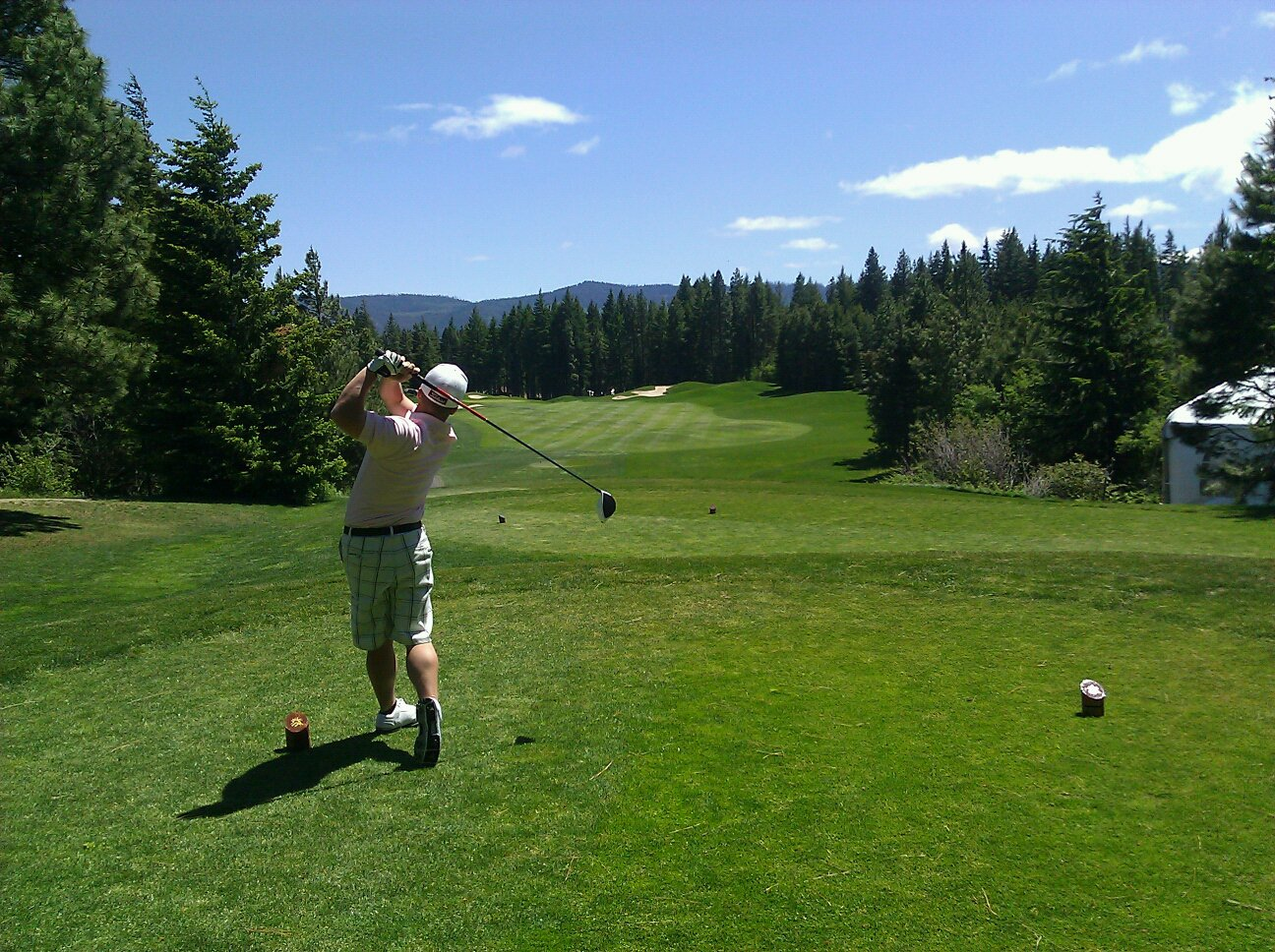
- Golfer in finishing position after hitting a tee shot
- Highest governing body: The R&A; USGA; IGF
- First played: 15th century, Scotland

Characteristics
- Contact: No
- Type: Outdoor
- Equipment: Ball, clubs, tee
- Glossary: Glossary of golf

Presence
- Olympic: 1900, 1904, since 2016,

Golf is a club-and-ball sport in which players use various clubs to hit a ball into a series of holes on a course in as few strokes as possible. The game was first played in the 15th century in Scotland, and as such, the country is often accredited as "the home of Golf".

Golf, unlike most ball games, cannot and does not use a standardized playing area, and coping with the varied terrains encountered on different courses is a key part of the game. Courses typically have either 9 or 18 holes, regions of terrain that each contain a cup, the hole that receives the ball. Each hole on a course has a teeing ground for the hole's first stroke, and a putting green containing the cup. There are several standard forms of terrain between the tee and the green, such as the fairway, rough (tall grass), and various hazards that may be water, rocks, or sand-filled bunkers. Each hole on a course is unique in its specific layout. Many golf courses are designed to resemble their native landscape, such as along a sea coast (where the course is called a links), within a forest, among rolling hills, or part of a desert.

Golf is played for the lowest number of strokes by an individual, known as stroke play, or the lowest score on the most individual holes in a complete round by an individual or team, known as match play. Stroke play is the most commonly seen format at all levels, especially at the elite level.

The modern game of golf originated in 15th-century Scotland. The 18-hole round was created at the Old Course at St Andrews in 1764. Golf's first major, and the world's oldest golf tournament, is The Open Championship, also known as The Open, which was first played in 1860 at Prestwick Golf Club in Ayrshire, Scotland. This is one of the four major championships in men's professional golf, the other three being played in the United States: The Masters, the U.S. Open, and the PGA Championship.

== Origin and history ==
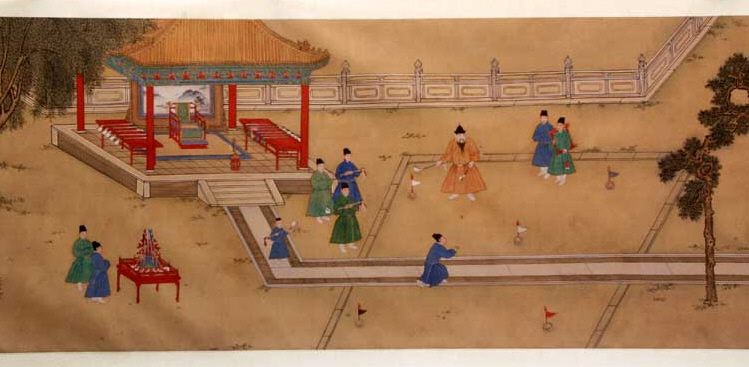
The Xuande Emperor of the Ming dynasty playing chuiwan

While the modern game of golf originated in 15th-century Scotland, the game's ancient origins are unclear and much debated.

Some historians trace the sport back to the Roman game of paganica, in which participants used a bent stick to hit a stuffed leather ball. One theory asserts that paganica spread throughout Europe as the Romans conquered most of the continent, during the first century BC, and eventually evolved into the modern game.

Others cite chuiwan (捶丸; "chui" means striking and "wan" means small ball) as the progenitor, a Chinese game played between the eighth and fourteenth centuries. A Ming Dynasty scroll by the artist Youqiu dating back to 1368 entitled "The Autumn Banquet" shows a member of the Chinese Imperial court swinging what appears to be a golf club at a small ball with the aim of sinking it into a hole. The game is thought to have been introduced into Europe during the Middle Ages.

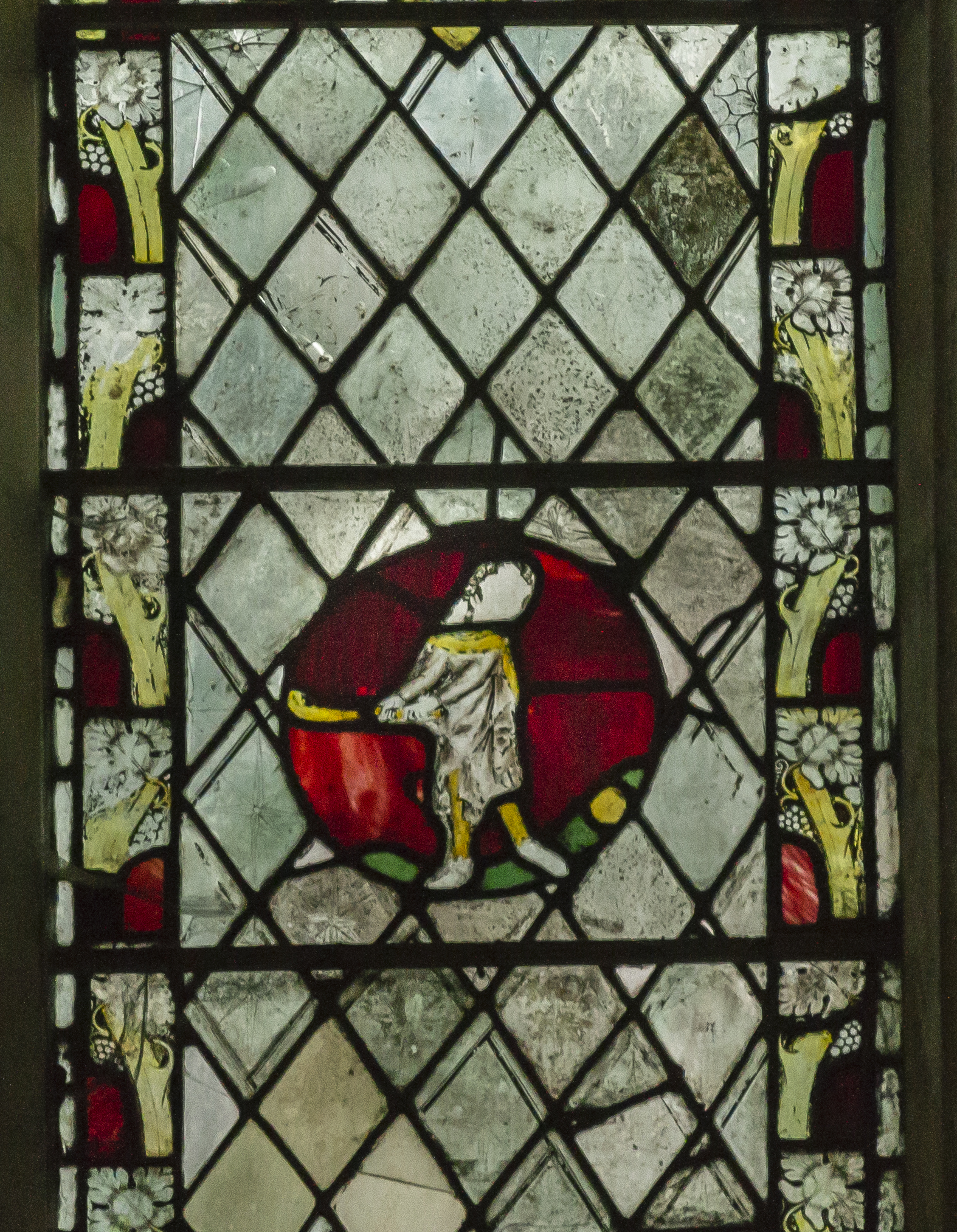
Stained Glass Window installed in Gloucester Cathedral in the 1350s. Said to be the oldest depiction of the sport.

Another early game that resembled modern golf was known as cambuca in England and chambot in France. The Persian game chowkan is another possible ancient origin, albeit being more polo-like. In addition, kolven (a game involving a ball and curved bats) was played annually in Loenen, Netherlands, beginning in 1297, to commemorate the capture of the assassin of Floris V, a year earlier.

The modern game originated in Scotland, where the first written record of golf is James II's banning of the game in 1457, as an unwelcome distraction to learning archery. James IV lifted the ban in 1502 when he became a golfer himself, with golf clubs first recorded in 1503–1504: "For golf clubbes and balles to the King that he playit with". To many golfers, the Old Course at St Andrews, a links course dating to before 1574, is considered to be a site of pilgrimage. In 1764, the standard 18-hole golf course was created at St Andrews when members modified the course from 22 to 18 holes. Golf is documented as being played on Musselburgh Links, East Lothian, Scotland as early as 2 March 1672, which is certified as the oldest golf course in the world by Guinness World Records. The oldest surviving rules of golf were compiled in March 1744 for the Company of Gentlemen Golfers, later renamed The Honourable Company of Edinburgh Golfers, which was played at Leith, Scotland. The world's oldest golf tournament in existence, and golf's first major, is The Open Championship, which was first played on 17 October 1860 at Prestwick Golf Club, in Ayrshire, Scotland, with Scottish golfers winning the earliest majors. Two Scotsmen from Dunfermline, John Reid and Robert Lockhart, first demonstrated golf in the U.S. by setting up a hole in an orchard in 1888, with Reid setting up America's first golf club the same year, Saint Andrew's Golf Club in Yonkers, New York.

== Golf course ==
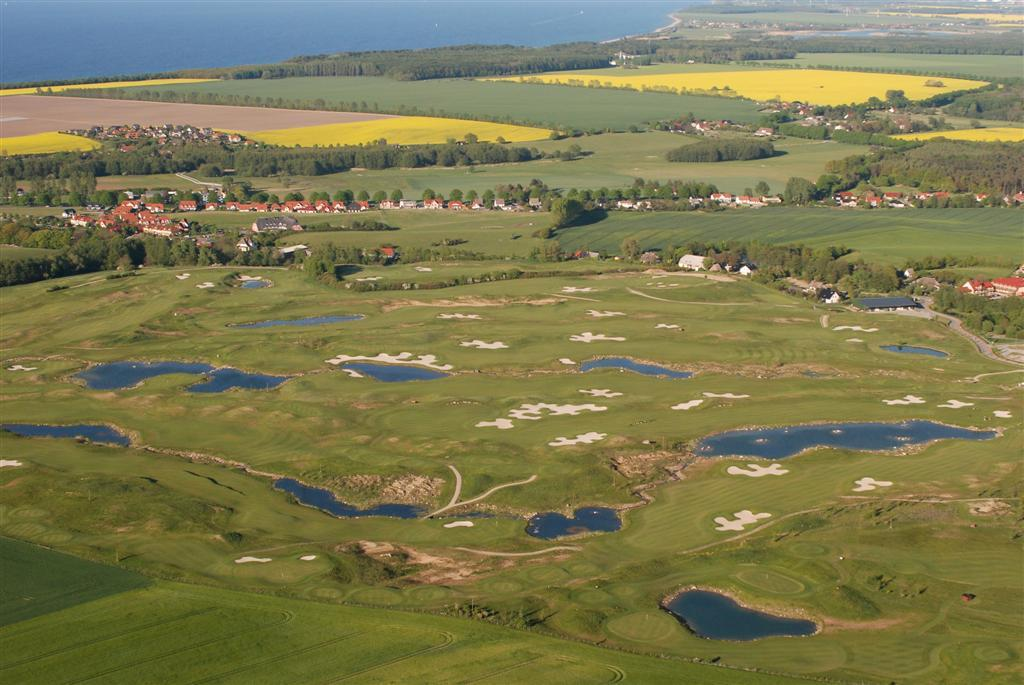
Aerial view of the Golfplatz Wittenbeck in Mecklenburg, Germany

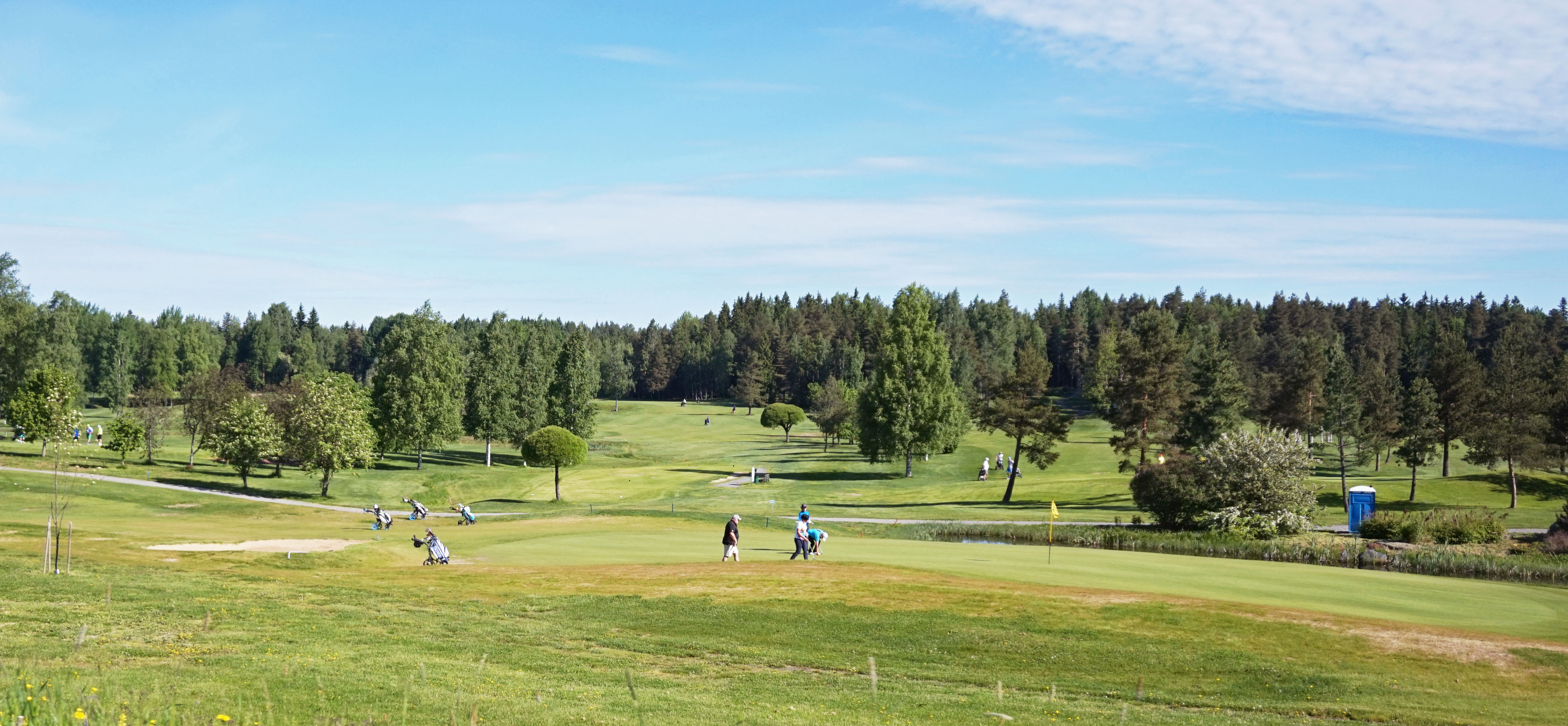
The Tammer Golf Course in the Ruotula district of Tampere, Finland

A golf course consists of either 9 or 18 holes, each with a teeing ground or "tee box" that is set off by two markers showing the bounds of the legal tee area, fairway, rough and other hazards, and the putting green surrounded by the fringe with the pin (normally a flagstick) and cup.

The levels of grass are varied to increase difficulty, or to allow for putting in the case of the green. While many holes are designed with a direct line-of-sight from the teeing area to the green, some holes may bend either to the left or to the right. This is commonly called a "dogleg", in reference to a dog's knee. The hole is called a "dogleg left" if the hole angles leftwards and "dogleg right" if it bends right. Sometimes, a hole's direction may bend twice; this is called a "double dogleg".

A regular golf course consists of 18 holes, but nine-hole courses are common and can be played twice through for a full round of 18 holes.

Early Scottish golf courses were primarily laid out on links land, soil-covered sand dunes directly inland from beaches. The word "links" derives from the Scots language and the Old English word hlinc ("rising ground, ridge"): traditionally these are coastal sand dunes but sometimes open parkland. This gave rise to the term "golf links", particularly applied to seaside courses and those built on naturally sandy soil inland.

The first 18-hole golf course in the United States was on a sheep farm in Downers Grove, Illinois, in 1892. The course is still there today.

== Play of the game ==
1=teeing ground, 2=water hazard, 3=rough, 4=out of bounds, 5=sand bunker, 6=water hazard, 7=fairway, 8=putting green, 9=flagstick, 10=hole

Every round of golf is based on playing a number of holes in a given order. A "round" typically consists of 18 holes that are played in the order determined by the course layout. Each hole is played once in the round on a standard course of 18 holes. The game can be played by any number of people, although a typical group will have 1–4 people playing the round. The typical amount of time required for pace of play is about two hours for a 9-hole round and four hours for an 18-hole round.

Playing a hole on a golf course is initiated by putting a ball into play by striking it with a club on the teeing ground (also called the tee box, or simply the tee). For this first shot on each hole, it is allowed but not required for the golfer to place the ball on a tee prior to striking it. A tee is a small peg that can be used to elevate the ball slightly above the ground up to a few centimetres high. Tees are commonly made of wood but may be constructed of any material, including plastic. Traditionally, golfers used mounds of sand to elevate the ball, and containers of sand were provided for the purpose. A few courses still require sand to be used instead of peg tees, to reduce litter and reduce damage to the teeing ground. Tees help reduce the interference of the ground or grass on the movement of the club making the ball easier to hit by elevating the ball from the playing surface.

When the initial shot on a hole is intended to move the ball a long distance, typically more than 225 yards (210 m), the shot is commonly called a "drive" and is generally made with a long-shafted, large-headed wood club called a "driver". Shorter holes may be initiated with other clubs, such as higher-numbered woods or irons. Once the ball comes to rest, the golfer strikes it again as many times as necessary using shots that are variously known as a "lay-up", an "approach", a "pitch", or a "chip", until the ball reaches the green, where the golfer then "putts" the ball into the hole (commonly called "sinking the putt" or "holing out"). The goal of getting the ball into the hole ("holing" the ball) in as few strokes as possible may be impeded by obstacles such as areas of longer grass called "rough" (usually found alongside fairways), which both slows any ball that contacts it and makes it harder to advance a ball that has stopped on it; "doglegs", which are changes in the direction of the fairway that often require shorter shots to play around them; bunkers (or sand traps); and water hazards such as ponds or streams.

In stroke play competitions, each player must play their ball until it is holed, recording the number of strokes made. Conversely in match play, once a player has equaled the number of strokes their opponents took to complete the hole, it is acceptable for them to concede the hole and pick up their ball. It is also acceptable in informal stroke play to surrender the hole after hitting three strokes more than the "par" rating of the hole (a "triple bogey" – see below); while technically a violation of Rule 3–2, this practice speeds play as a courtesy to others, and avoids "runaway scores" and excessive frustration. Alternatively, in competition, the committee may designate a maximum score possible for a hole for the same reasons, while formalizing the surrender or "pick-up" rule.

The total distance from the first teeing ground to the 18th green can be quite long; total yardages "through the green" can be in excess of 7,000 yards (6,400 m), and when adding in the travel distance between the green of one hole and the tee of the next, even skilled players may easily travel 5 miles (8.0 km) or more during a round. At some courses, gas or electric golf carts are used to travel between shots, which can speed-up play and allows participation by individuals unable to walk a whole round. On other courses players generally walk the course, either carrying their bag using a shoulder strap or using a "golf trolley" for their bag. These trolleys may or may not be battery assisted. At many amateur tournaments including U.S. high school and college play, players are required to walk and to carry their own bags, but at the professional and top amateur level, as well as at high-level private clubs, players may be accompanied by caddies, who carry and manage the players' equipment and who are allowed by the rules to give advice on the play of the course.

== Rules and regulations ==
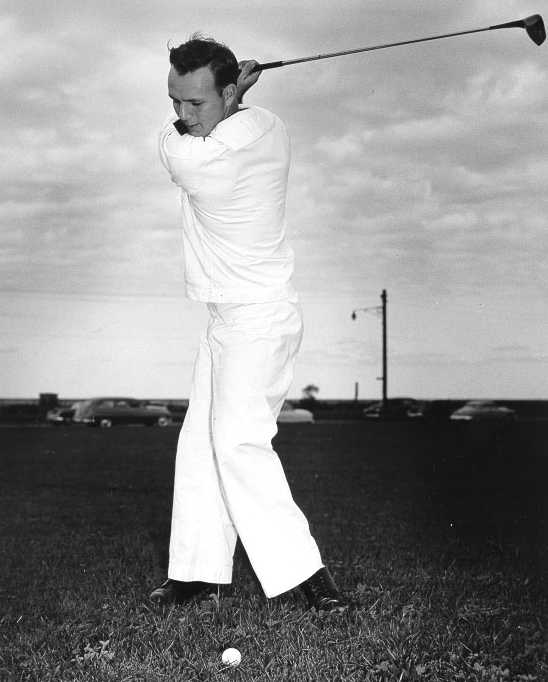
Arnold Palmer in 1953

The rules of golf are internationally standardised and are jointly governed by The R&A, spun off in 2004 from The Royal and Ancient Golf Club of St Andrews (founded 1754), and the United States Golf Association (USGA). With the aim of simplifying the rules, in 2017 the USGA and R&A undertook a complete rewrite. The new rule book came into effect in January 2019.

The underlying principle of the rules is fairness. As stated on the back cover of the official rule book:

Play the ball as it lies, play the course as you find it, and if you cannot do either, do what is fair.

There are strict regulations regarding the amateur status of golfers. Essentially, anybody who has ever received payment or compensation for giving instruction, or played golf for money, is not considered an amateur and may not participate in competitions limited solely to amateurs. However, amateur golfers may receive expenses that comply with strict guidelines and they may accept non-cash prizes within the limits established by the Rules of Amateur Status.

In addition to the officially printed rules, golfers also abide by a set of guidelines called golf etiquette. Etiquette guidelines cover matters such as safety, fairness, pace of play, and a player's obligation to contribute to the care of the course. Though there are no penalties for breach of etiquette rules, players generally follow the rules of golf etiquette in an effort to improve everyone's playing experience.

=== Penalties ===
Penalty strokes are incurred in certain situations and are counted towards a player's score as if there were extra swing(s) at the ball. Either one or two strokes are added for most rule infractions or for taking relief from various situations, with the "general penalty" defined as two-strokes, and disqualification for severe or repeated rule breaches. Examples include:

- A lost ball or a ball hit out of bounds (OB) results in a penalty of one stroke and distance (Rule 18.2).
- With the exception of certain circumstances, a one-stroke penalty is assessed if a player causes their ball to move (Rule 9.4).
- A one-stroke penalty is assessed if a player elects to take relief when their ball comes to rest within a red or yellow penalty area (Rule 17), or from an unplayable lie (Rule 19).
- A two-stroke penalty is incurred for making a stroke at the wrong ball (Rule 6.3c).
- A two-stroke penalty is incurred for hitting a fellow player's ball if both balls lay on the green prior to the stroke (Rule 11.1a).
- Disqualification can result from cheating, signing for a lower score, or failing to adhere to one or more rules that lead to improper play.

== Equipment ==
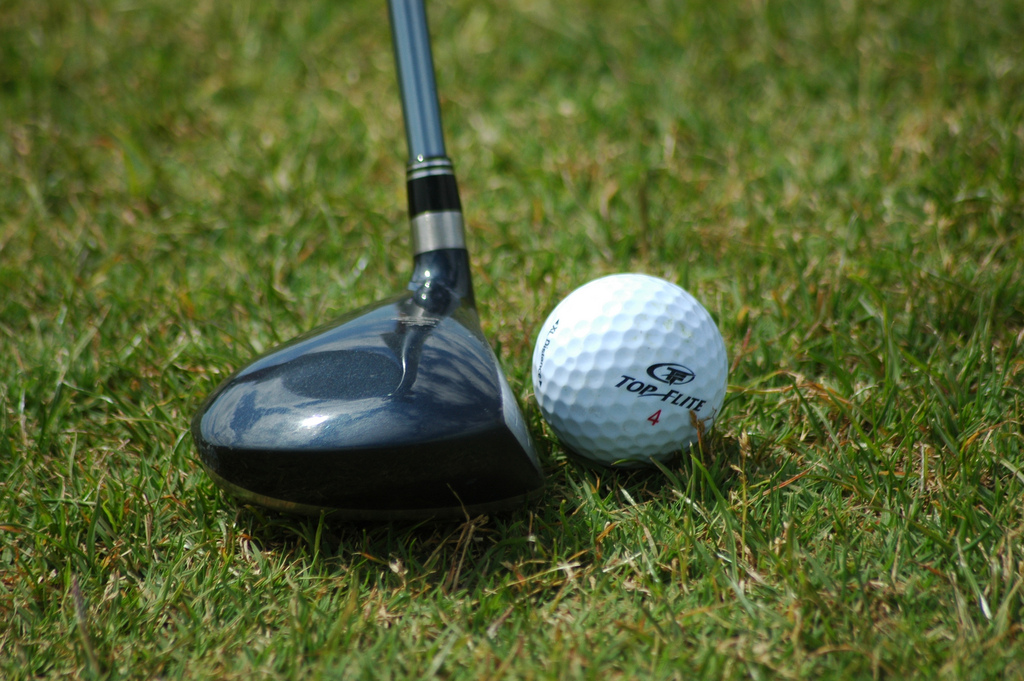
A wood positioned ready to be swung and to strike a golf ball

Golf clubs are used to hit a golf ball. Each club is composed of a shaft with a lance (or "grip") on the top end and a club head on the bottom. Long clubs, which have a lower degree of loft, are those meant to propel the ball a comparatively longer distance, and short clubs a higher degree of loft and a comparatively shorter distance. The actual physical length of each club is longer or shorter, depending on the distance the club is intended to propel the ball.

Golf clubs have traditionally been arranged into three basic types. Woods are large-headed, long-shafted clubs meant to propel the ball a long distance from relatively "open" lies, such as the teeing ground and fairway. Of particular importance is the driver or "1-wood", which is the lowest lofted wood club, and in modern times has become highly specialized for making extremely long-distance tee shots, up to 300 yards (270 m), or more, in a professional golfer's hands. Traditionally these clubs had heads made of a hardwood, hence the name, but virtually all modern woods are now made of metal such as titanium, or of composite materials. Irons are shorter-shafted clubs with a metal head primarily consisting of a flat, angled striking face. Traditionally the clubhead was forged from iron; modern iron clubheads are investment-cast from a steel alloy. Irons of varying loft are used for a variety of shots from virtually anywhere on the course, but most often for shorter-distance shots approaching the green, or to get the ball out of tricky lies such as sand traps. The third class is the putter, which evolved from the irons to create a low-lofted, balanced club designed to roll the ball along the green and into the hole. Putters are virtually always used on the green or in the surrounding rough/fringe. A fourth class, called hybrids, evolved as a cross between woods and irons, and are typically seen replacing the low-lofted irons with a club that provides similar distance, but a higher launch angle and a more forgiving nature.

A maximum of 14 clubs is allowed in a player's bag at one time during a stipulated round. The choice of clubs is at the golfer's discretion, although every club must be constructed in accordance with parameters outlined in the rules. (Clubs that meet these parameters are usually called "conforming".) Violation of these rules can result in disqualification.

The exact shot hit at any given time on a golf course, and which club is used to accomplish the shot, are always completely at the discretion of the golfer; in other words, there is no restriction whatsoever on which club a golfer may or may not use at any time for any shot.

Golf balls are spherical, usually white (although other colours are allowed), and minutely pock-marked by dimples that decrease aerodynamic drag by increasing air turbulence around the ball in motion, which delays "boundary layer" separation and reduces the drag-inducing "wake" behind the ball, thereby allowing the ball to fly farther. The combination of a soft "boundary layer" and a hard "core" enables both distance and spin.

A tee is allowed only for the first stroke on each hole, unless the player must hit a provisional tee shot or replay their first shot from the tee.

Many golfers wear golf shoes with metal or plastic spikes designed to increase traction, thus allowing for longer and more accurate shots.

A golf bag is used to transport golf clubs and the player's other or personal equipment. Golf bags have several pockets designed for carrying equipment and supplies such as tees, balls, and gloves. Golf bags can be carried, pulled on a trolley or harnessed to a motorized golf cart during play. Golf bags usually have both a hand strap and shoulder strap for carrying, others may be carried over both shoulders like a backpack, and often bags have retractable legs that allow the bag to stand upright when at rest.

== Stroke mechanics ==
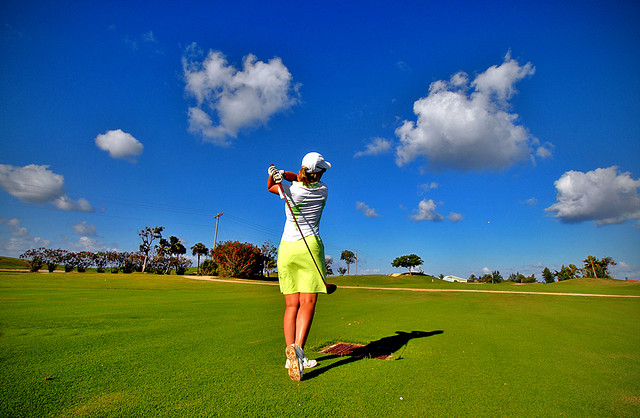
A golfer takes an approach shot on the fairway.

The golf swing is outwardly similar to many other motions involving swinging a tool or playing implement, such as an axe or a baseball bat. However, unlike many of these motions, the result of the swing is highly dependent on several sub-motions being properly aligned and timed. These ensure that the club travels up to the ball in line with the desired path; that the clubface is in line with the swing path; and that the ball hits the centre or "sweet spot" of the clubface. The ability to do this consistently, across a complete set of clubs with a wide range of shaft lengths and clubface areas, is a key skill for any golfer, and takes a significant effort to achieve.

=== Stance ===
Stance refers to how the golfer positions themselves in order to play a stroke; it is fundamentally important in being able to play a stroke effectively. The stance adopted is determined by what stroke is being played. All stances involve a slight crouch. This allows for a more efficient striking posture whilst also isometrically preloading the muscles of the legs and core; this allows the stroke to be played more dynamically and with a greater level of overall control. When adopting their stance golfers start with the non-dominant side of the body facing the target (for a right-hander, the target is to their left). Setting the stance in regard to the position of the ball, and placing the clubhead behind the ball, is known as being at address; when in this position the player's body and the centerline of the club face are positioned parallel to the desired line of travel, with the feet either perpendicular to that line or slightly splayed outward. The feet are commonly shoulder-width apart for middle irons and putters, narrower for short irons and wider for long irons and woods. The ball is typically positioned more to the "front" of the player's stance (closer to the leading foot) for lower-lofted clubs, with the usual ball position for a drive being just behind the arch of the leading foot. The ball is placed further "back" in the player's stance (toward the trailing foot) as the loft of the club to be used increases. Most iron shots and putts are made with the ball roughly centered in the stance, while a few mid- and short-iron shots are made with the ball slightly behind the centre of the stance to ensure consistent contact between the ball and clubface, so the ball is on its way before the club continues down into the turf.

=== Strokes ===
The golfer chooses a golf club, grip, and stroke appropriate to the distance:

- The "drive" or "full swing" is used on the teeing ground and fairway, typically with a wood or long iron, to produce the maximum distance capable with the club. In the extreme, the windup can end with the shaft of the club parallel to the ground above the player's shoulders.
- The "approach" or "3/4 swing" is used in medium- and long-distance situations where an exact distance and good accuracy is preferable to maximum possible distance, such as to place the ball on the green or "lay up" in front of a hazard. The windup or "backswing" of such a shot typically ends up with the shaft of the club pointing straight upwards or slightly towards the player.
- The "chip" or "half-swing" is used for relatively short-distance shots near the green, with high-lofted irons and wedges. The goal of the chip is to land the ball safely on the green, allowing it to roll out towards the hole. It can also be used from other places to accurately position the ball into a more advantageous lie. The backswing typically ends with the head of the club between hip and head height.
- The "putt" is used in short-distance shots on or near the green, typically made with the eponymous "putter", although similar strokes can be made with medium to high-numbered irons to carry a short distance in the air and then roll (a "bump and run"). The backswing and follow-through of the putt are both abbreviated compared to other strokes, with the head of the club rarely rising above the knee. The goal of the putt is usually to put the ball in the hole, although a long-distance putt may be called a "lag" and is made with the primary intention of simply closing distance to the hole or otherwise placing the ball advantageously.

Having chosen a club and stroke to produce the desired distance, the player addresses the ball by taking their stance to the side of it and (except when the ball lies in a hazard) grounding the club behind the ball. The golfer then takes their backswing, rotating the club, their arms and their upper body away from the ball, and then begins their swing, bringing the clubhead back down and around to hit the ball. A proper golf swing is a complex combination of motions, and slight variations in posture or positioning can make a great deal of difference in how well the ball is hit and how straight it travels. The general goal of a player making a full swing is to propel the clubhead as fast as possible while maintaining a single "plane" of motion of the club and clubhead, to send the clubhead into the ball along the desired path of travel and with the clubhead also pointing that direction.

Accuracy and consistency are typically stressed over pure distance. A player with a straight drive that travels only 220 yards (200 m) will nevertheless be able to accurately place the ball into a favourable lie on the fairway, and can make up for the lesser distance of any given club by simply using "more club" (a lower loft) on their tee shot or on subsequent fairway and approach shots. However, a golfer with a drive that may go 280 yards (260 m) but often does not fly straight will be less able to position their ball advantageously; the ball may "hook", "pull", "draw", "fade", "push" or "slice" off the intended line and land out of bounds or in the rough or hazards, and thus the player will require many more strokes to hole out.

=== Musculature ===
A golf stroke uses the muscles of the core (especially erector spinae muscles and latissimus dorsi muscle when turning), hamstring, shoulder, and wrist. Stronger muscles in the wrist can prevent them from being twisted during swings, whilst stronger shoulders increase the turning force. Weak wrists can also transmit the force to elbows and even neck and lead to injury. (When a muscle contracts, it pulls equally from both ends and, to have movement at only one end of the muscle, other muscles must come into play to stabilize the bone to which the other end of the muscle is attached.) Golf is a unilateral exercise that can break body balances, requiring exercises to keep the balance in muscles.

=== Types of putting ===
Putting is considered to be the most important component of the game of golf. As the game of golf has evolved, there have been many different putting techniques and grips that have been devised to give golfers the best chance to make putts. When the game originated, golfers would putt with their dominant hand on the bottom of the grip and their weak hand on top of the grip. This grip and putting style is known as "conventional". There are many variations of conventional including overlap, where the golfer overlaps the off hand index finger onto off the dominant pinky; interlock, where the offhand index finger interlocks with the dominant pinky and ring finger; double or triple overlap and so on. Recently, "cross handed" putting has become a popular trend amongst professional golfers and amateurs. Cross handed putting is the idea that the dominant hand is on top of the grip where the weak hand is on the bottom. This grip restricts the motion in your dominant hand and eliminates the possibility of wrist breakdowns through the putting stroke.

Other notable putting styles include "the claw", a style that has the grip directly in between the thumb and index finger of the dominant hand while the palm faces the target. The weak hand placed normally on the putter. Anchored putting, a style that requires a longer putter shaft that can be anchored into the player's stomach or below the chin; the idea is to stabilize one end of the putter thus creating a more consistent pendulum stroke. This style has been banned on professional circuits since 2016.

== Scoring and handicapping ==
=== Par ===
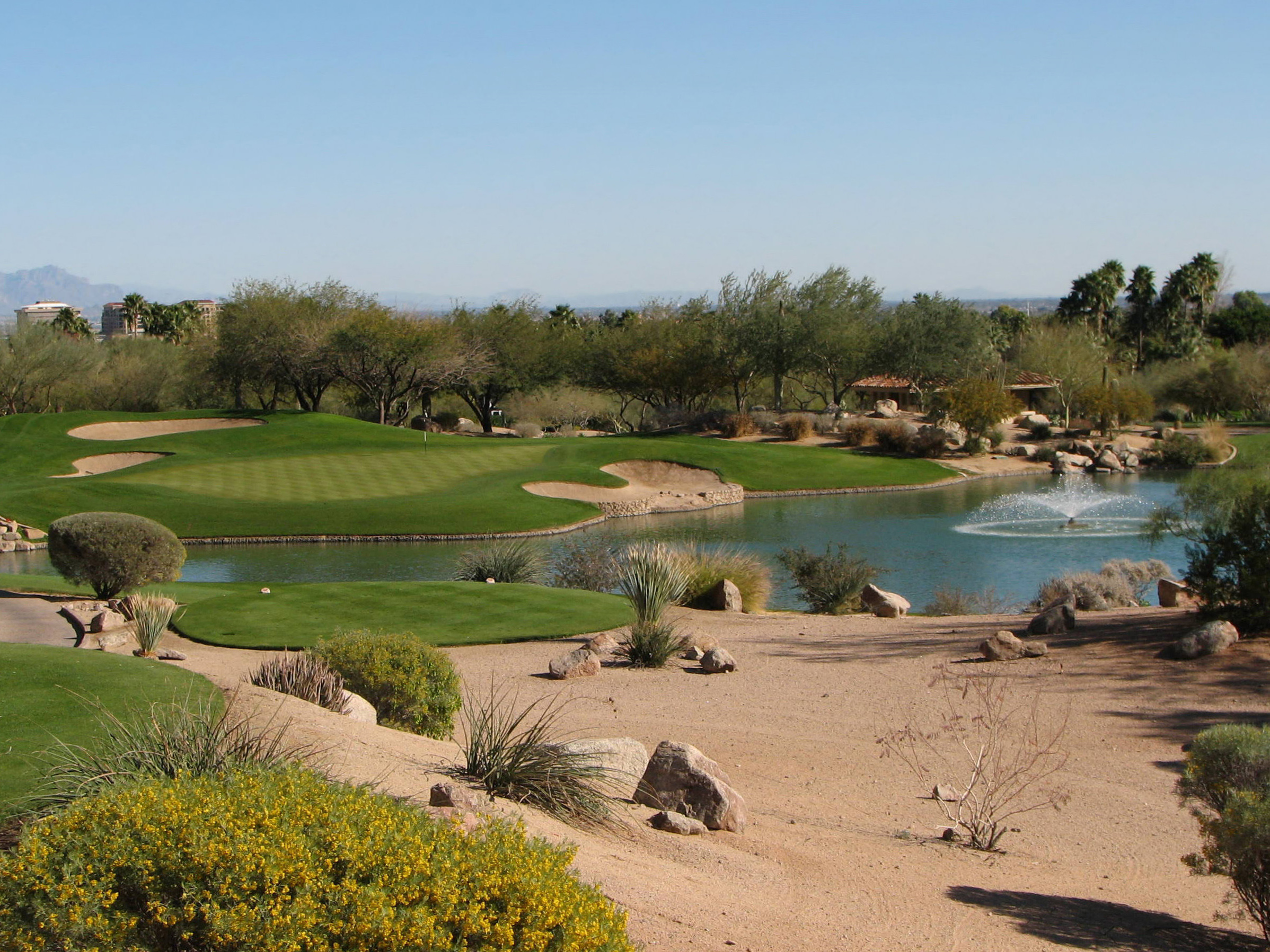
A par-3 hole in Phoenician Golf Club, Scottsdale, Arizona

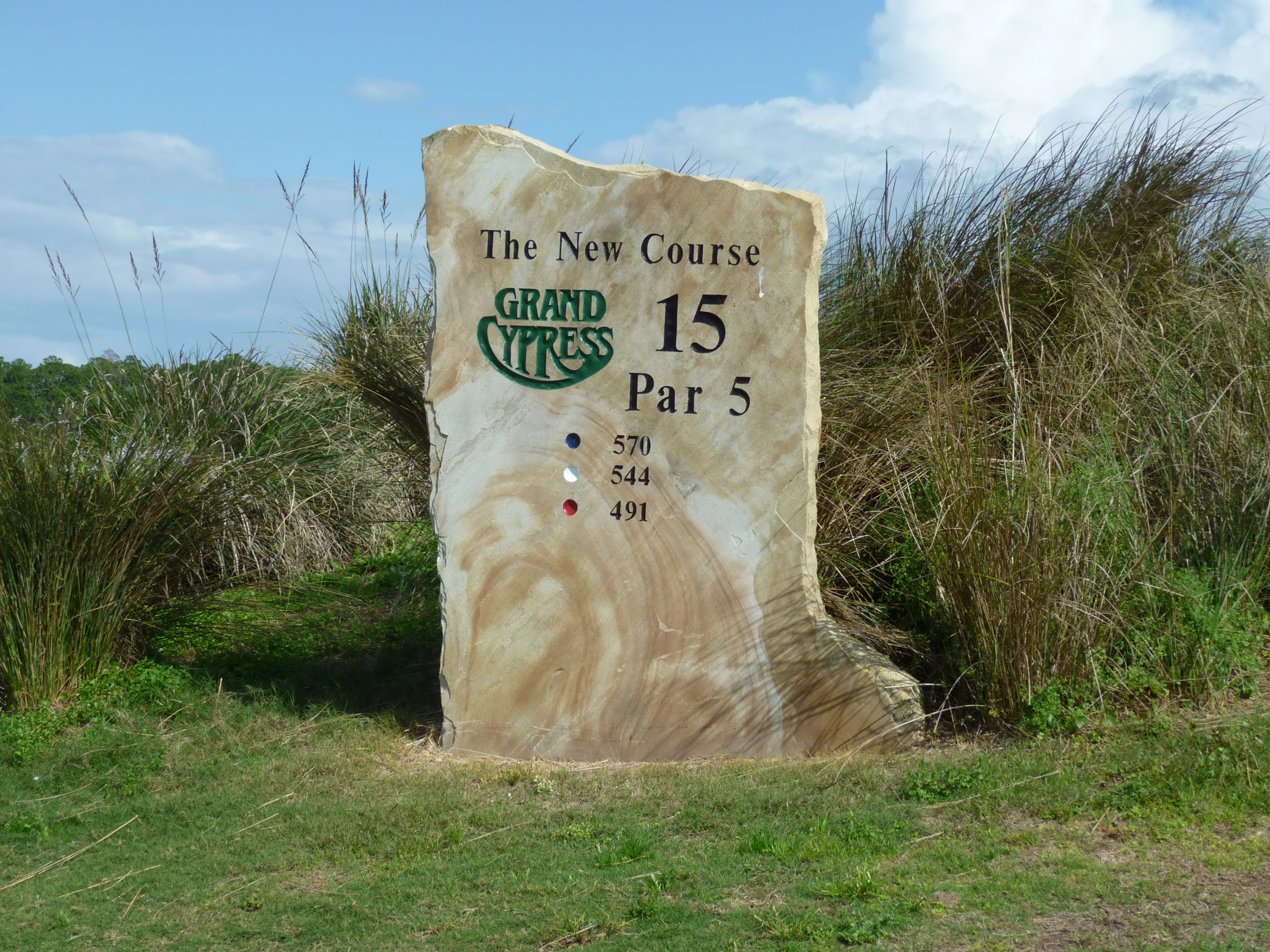
A marker stone indicating that this hole is a par-5 hole

A hole is classified by its par, which gives an indication of the number of strokes a skilled golfer may be expected to need to complete play of the hole. The primary factor for classifying the par of a relatively straight, hazard-free hole is the distance from the tee to the green, and calculates the number of strokes a skilled golfer is expected to require to reach the green with an additional allowance of 2 putts. As such, the minimum par of any hole is 3; one stroke for the tee shot and two putts. Par 3, 4 and 5 holes are commonplace on golf courses; far more rarely, courses may feature par-6 and even par-7 holes.

For men, a typical par-3 hole is less than 250 yards (230 m) in length, with a par-4 hole ranging between 251–450 yards (230–411 m), and a par-5 hole being longer than 450 yards (410 m); for women these boundaries are lower, and for professionals they are much increased. The rare par-6s can stretch well over 650 yards (590 m). These distances are based on the typical scratch golfer's drive distance of between 240 and 280 yards (220 and 260 m). Although length is the primary factor in calculating par, other factors are taken into account; however the number of strokes a scratch golfer should take to make the green remains foremost. Factors affecting the calculation include altitude, gradient of the land from the tee to green, and forced "lay-ups" due to dog-legs (sharp bends) or obstacles (e.g. bunkers, water hazards).

Getting the ball onto the green in two strokes less than par, and hence meeting the par calculation criteria, is called making "green in regulation" or GIR. Missing a GIR does not necessarily mean a golfer will not make par, but it does make doing so more difficult as it reduces the number of putts available; conversely, making a GIR does not guarantee a par, as the player might require three or more putts to "hole out". Professional golfers typically make between 60% and 70% of greens in regulation.

Eighteen-hole courses typically total to an overall par score of 70 to 72 for a complete round; with most holes having a par of 4, and a smaller number of par-3 and par-5 holes. Additionally, courses may be classified according to their play difficulty, which may be used to calculate a golfer's handicap. The two primary difficulty ratings in the U.S. are the Course Rating, which is the expected score for a zero-handicap "scratch golfer", and the Slope Rating, which is a measure of how much worse a "bogey golfer" (handicap around 20) would be expected to play than a "scratch golfer" relative to their handicap.

==== Scoring ====
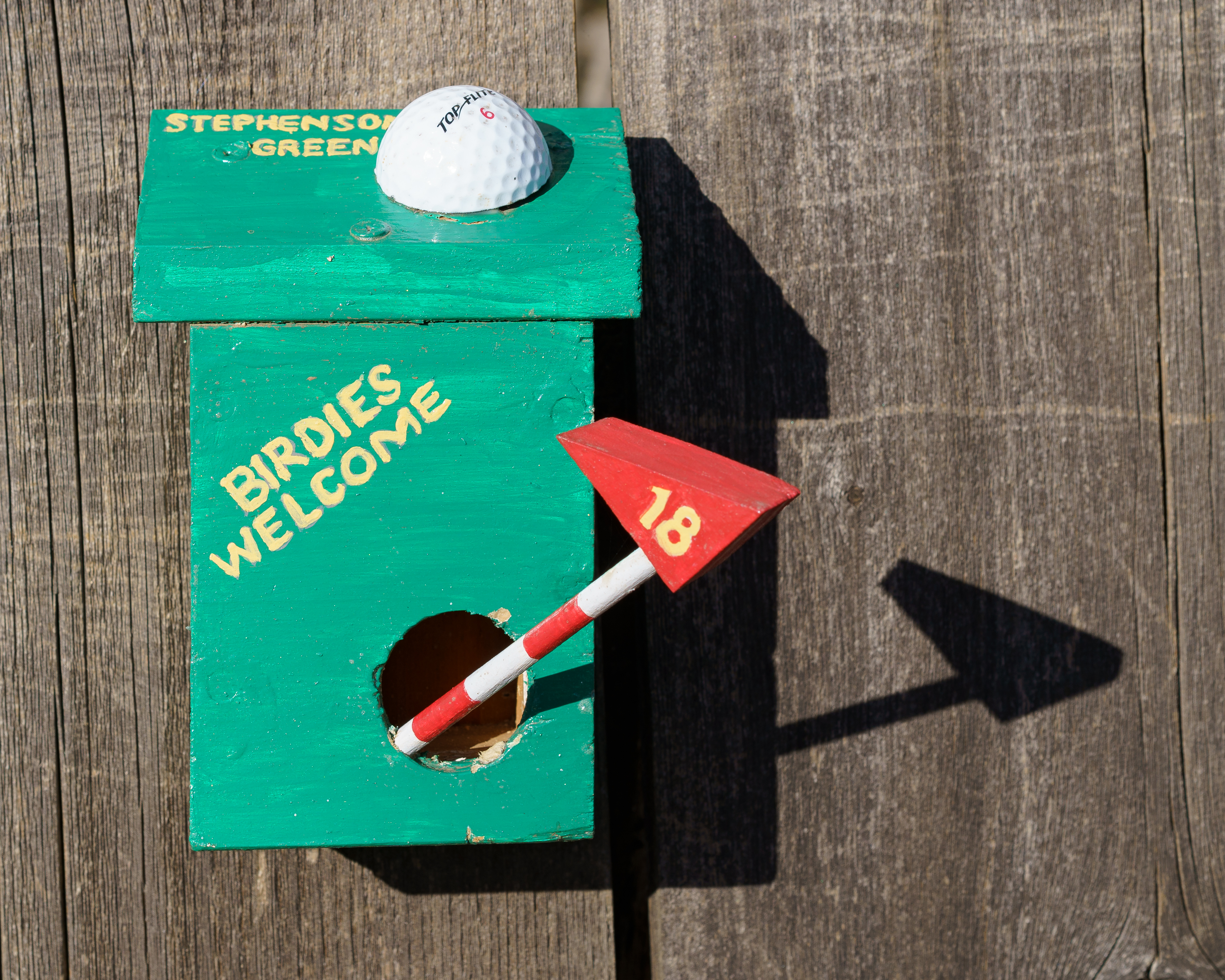
Golf-themed decorative nest box "Birdies Welcome"

The goal is to play as few strokes per round as possible. A golfer's number of strokes in a hole, course, or tournament is compared to its respective par score, and is then reported either as the number that the golfer was "under-" or "over-par", or if it was "equal to par". A hole in one (or an "ace") occurs when a golfer sinks their ball into the cup with their first stroke from the tee. Common scores for a hole also have specific terms.

| Numeric term | Name | Definition |
|---|---|---|
| −4 | Condor | four strokes under par |
| −3 | Albatross (Double eagle) | three strokes under par |
| −2 | Eagle | two strokes under par |
| −1 | Birdie | one stroke under par |
| E | Par | equal to par |
| +1 | Bogey | one stroke over par |
| +2 | Double bogey | two strokes over par |
| +3 | Triple bogey | three strokes over par |

In a typical professional tournament or among "scratch" amateur players, "birdie-bogey" play is common; a player will "lose" a stroke by bogeying a hole, then "gain" one by scoring a birdie. Eagles are uncommon but not rare; however, only 18 players have scored an albatross in a men's major championship. One of the rarest feats in golf is the condor, which has never occurred in a professional tournament. Only five condors have been verified to have ever occurred, although none of the courses involved were professionally accredited.

=== Basic forms of golf ===
There are two basic forms of golf play, match play and stroke play. Stroke play is more popular.

==== Match play ====
Two players (or two teams) play each hole as a separate contest against each other in what is called match play. The party with the lower score wins that hole, or if the scores of both players or teams are equal the hole is "halved" (or tied). The game is won by the party that wins more holes than the other. In the case that one team or player has taken a lead that cannot be overcome in the number of holes remaining to be played, the match is deemed to be won by the party in the lead, and the remainder of the holes are not played. For example, if one party already has a lead of six holes, and only five holes remain to be played on the course, the match is over and the winning party is deemed to have won "6 & 5". At any given point, if the lead is equal to the number of holes remaining, the party leading the match is said to be "dormie", and the match is continued until the party increases the lead by one hole or ties any of the remaining holes, thereby winning the match, or until the match ends in a tie with the lead player's opponent winning all remaining holes. When the game is tied after the predetermined number of holes have been played, it may be continued until one side takes a one-hole lead.

==== Stroke play ====
The score achieved for each and every hole of the round or tournament is added to produce the total score, and the player with the lowest score wins in stroke play. Stroke play is the game most commonly played by professional golfers. If there is a tie after the regulation number of holes in a professional tournament, a playoff takes place between all tied players. Playoffs either are sudden death or employ a pre-determined number of holes, anywhere from three to a full 18. In sudden death, a player who scores lower on a hole than all of their opponents wins the match. If at least two players remain tied after such a playoff using a pre-determined number of holes, then play continues in sudden death format, where the first player to win a hole wins the tournament.

=== Other formats of play ===
There are many variations in scoring and playing formats in the game of golf, some officially defined in the Rules of Golf. Variations include the popular Stableford scoring system, and various team formats. Some common and popular examples are listed below.

There are also variations on the usual starting procedure where everyone begins from the first tee and plays all holes in order, through to the eighteenth. In large field tournaments, especially on professional tours, a two tee start is commonplace, where the field will be split between starting on the first tee and the tenth tee (sometimes the eighth or eleventh depending on proximity to the clubhouse). Shotgun starts are mainly used for amateur tournament or society play. In this variant, each of the groups playing starts their game on a different hole, allowing for all players to start and end their round at roughly the same time. For example, a group starting on hole 5 will play through to the 18th hole and continue with hole 1, ending their round on hole 4.

==== Bogey or par competition ====
A bogey or par competition is a scoring format sometimes seen in informal tournaments. Its scoring is similar to match play, except each player compares their hole score to the hole's par rating instead of the score of another player. The player "wins" the hole if they score a birdie or better, they "lose" the hole if they score a bogey or worse, and they "halve" the hole by scoring par. By recording only this simple win–loss–halve score on the sheet, a player can shrug off a very poorly-played hole with a simple "-" mark and move on. As used in competitions, the player or pair with the best win–loss differential wins the competition.

==== Stableford ====
The Stableford system is a simplification of stroke play that awards players points based on their score relative to the hole's par; the score for a hole is calculated by taking the par score, adding 2, then subtracting the player's hole score, making the result zero if negative. Alternately stated, a double bogey or worse is zero points, a bogey is worth one point, par is two, a birdie three, an eagle four, and so on. The advantages of this system over stroke play are a more natural "higher is better" scoring, the ability to compare Stableford scores between plays on courses with different total par scores (scoring an "even" in stroke play will always give a Stableford score of 36), discouraging the tendency to abandon the entire game after playing a particularly bad hole (a novice playing by strict rules may score as high as an 8 or 10 on a single difficult hole; their Stableford score for the hole would be zero, which puts them only two points behind par no matter how badly they played), and the ability to simply pick up one's ball once it is impossible to score any points for the hole, which speeds play.

The USGA and R&A sanction a "Modified Stableford" system for scratch players, which makes par worth zero, a birdie worth 2, eagle 5 and double-eagle 8, while a bogey is a penalty of −1 and a double-bogey or worse −3. As with the original system, the highest score wins the game, and terrible scores on one or two holes will not ruin a player's overall score, but this system rewards "bogey-birdie" play more than the original, encouraging golfers to try to make riskier birdie putt or eagle chipshots instead of simply parring each hole.

==== Basic pairs formats ====
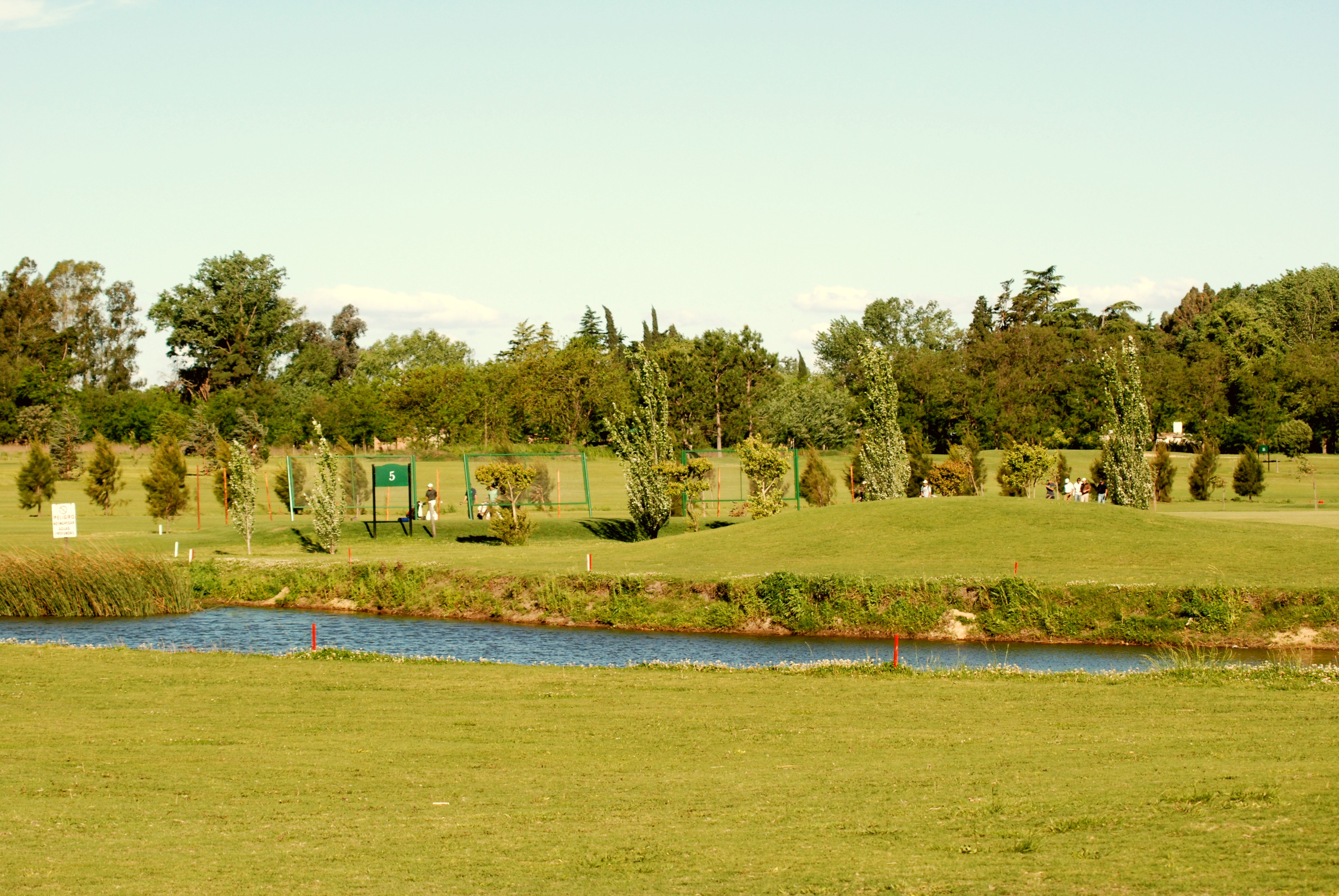
Junín Golf Club, in Junín, Argentina

- Foursomes (also known as Alternate Shot): defined in Rule 22, this is played in pairs, in which each team has only one ball and players alternate playing it. For example, if players "A" and "B" form a team, "A" tees off on the first hole, "B" will play the second shot, "A" the third, and so on until the hole is finished. On the second hole, "B" will tee off (regardless who played the last putt on the first hole), then "A" plays the second shot, and so on. Foursomes can be played as match play or stroke play.
  - Greensomes (also known as Scotch Foursomes): also called modified alternate shot, this is played in pairs; both players tee off, and then pick the best shot. The player who did not shoot the best first shot plays the second shot. The play then alternates as in a foursome. A variant of greensome is sometimes played where the opposing team chooses which of their opponent's tee shots the opponents should use.
- Four-ball: defined in Rules 23, this is also played in pairs, but every each plays their own ball and for each team, the lower score on each hole counts. Four-ball can be played as match play or stroke play.

==== Team formats ====
- Scramble: also known as ambrose or best-shot; each player in a team tees off on each hole, and the players decide which shot was best. Every player then plays their second shot from within a clublength of where the best shot has come to rest (and no closer to the hole), and the procedure is repeated until the hole is finished. This system is very common at informal tournaments such as for charity, as it speeds play (due to the reduced number of shots taken from bad lies), allows teams of varying sizes, and allows players of widely varying skill levels to participate without profoundly affecting team score.
- Best-ball: like four-ball, each player plays the hole as normal, but the lowest score of all the players on the team counts as the team's score for the hole. There are many variations on this format, which count a different number of scores on each hole.

=== Handicap systems ===
A handicap is a numerical measure of a golfer's potential scoring ability over 18 holes. It is used to enable players of widely varying abilities to compete against one another. Better players are those with the lowest handicaps, and someone with a handicap of 0 or less is often referred to as a scratch golfer. Handicap systems vary throughout the world and use different methods to assess courses and calculate handicaps. In order to address difficulties in translating between these systems the USGA and The R&A, working with the various existing handicapping authorities, devised a new World Handicap System which was introduced globally starting in 2020.

Golf courses are assessed and rated according to the average good score of a scratch golfer, taking into account a multitude of factors affecting play, such as length, obstacles, undulations, etc. A player's handicap gives an indication of the number of strokes above this course rating that the player will make over the course of an "average best" round of golf, i.e. scoring near their potential, above average. Lower handicap players are generally the most consistent, so can be expected to play to this standard or better more often than higher handicappers. Some handicap systems also account for differences in scoring difficulty between low and high handicap golfer. They do this by means of assessing and rating courses according to the average good score of a "bogey golfer", a player with a handicap of around 20. This is used with the course rating to calculate a slope rating, which is used to adjust golfer's handicap to produce a playing handicap for the course and set of tees being used.

Handicap systems have potential for abuse by players who may intentionally play badly to increase their handicap (sandbagging) before playing to their potential at an important event with a valuable prize. For this reason, handicaps are not used in professional golf, but they can still be calculated and used along with other criteria to determine the relative strengths of various professional players. Touring professionals, being the best of the best, have negative handicaps; they can be expected, more often than not, to score lower than the Course Rating on any course.

== Popularity ==
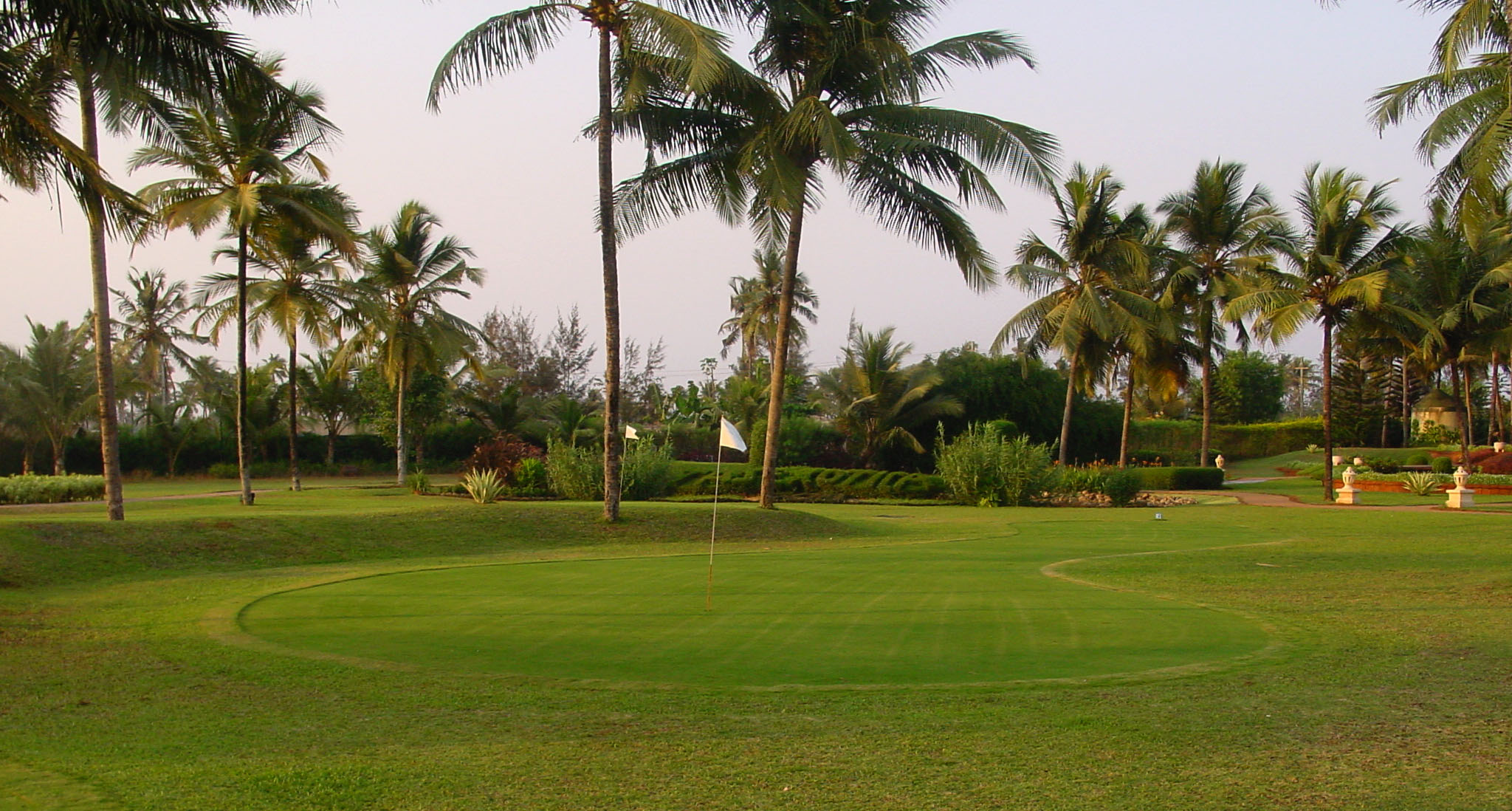
Part of a golf course in western India

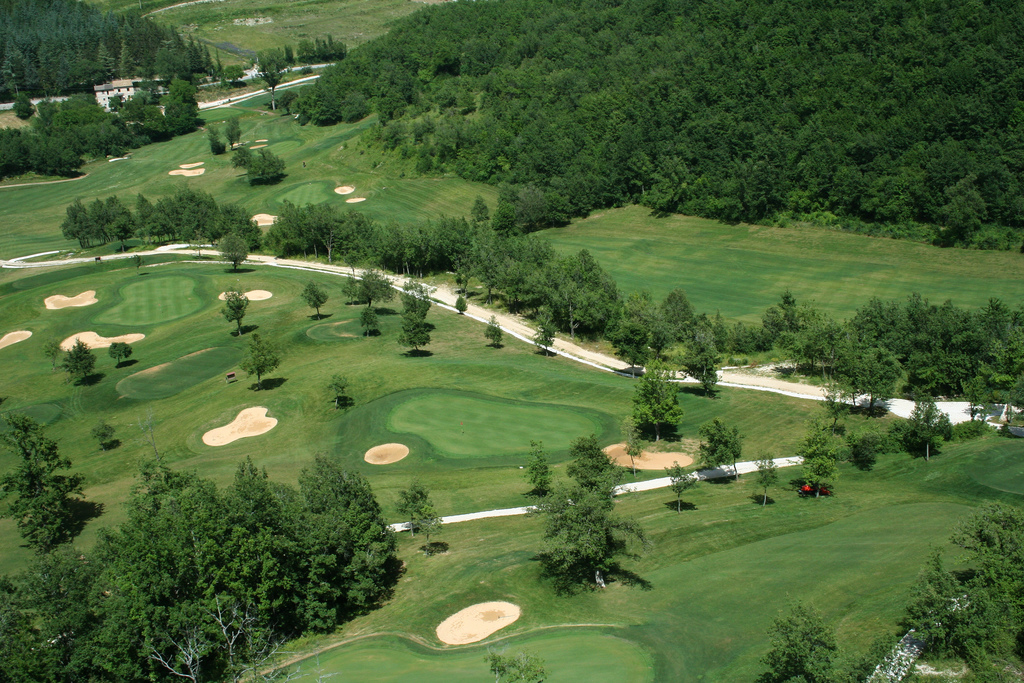
An aerial view of a golf course in Italy

In 2005, Golf Digest calculated that the countries with the most golf courses per capita, in order, were: Scotland, New Zealand, Australia, Ireland, Canada, Wales, the United States, Sweden, and England (countries with fewer than 500,000 people were excluded).

The number of courses in other territories has increased, an example of this being the expansion of golf in China. The first golf course in China opened in 1984, but by the end of 2009, there were roughly 600 golf courses in China. For much of the 21st century, the development of new golf courses in China has been officially banned (with the exception of the island province of Hainan), but the number of courses had nonetheless tripled from 2004 to 2009; the "ban" has been evaded with the government's tacit approval simply by not mentioning golf in any development plans.

In the United States, women made up 25 percent of golfers in 2021, which was up from 19 percent since 2011 and junior female golfers account for 35 percent or 1.1 million golfers.

In the United States, the number of people who play golf twenty-five times or more per year decreased from 6.9 million in 2000 to 4.6 million in 2005, according to the National Golf Foundation. The NGF reported that the number who played golf at all decreased from 30 to 26 million over the same period.

In February 1971, astronaut Alan Shepard became the first person to golf anywhere other than on Earth. He smuggled a golf club head and two golf balls on board Apollo 14 in order to play golf on the Moon. He attached the head to a tool for collecting rock samples, and attempted two drives. He shanked the first attempt, but it is estimated his second went 40 yards (37 m).

=== Golf courses worldwide ===
As of 2019, the United States has the highest number of golf courses—as much as 43% of all courses in the world—and combined with second placed Japan together account for a majority (51%) of golf courses worldwide. Below is a table stating the number of golf courses in countries:

Golf courses by country
| Country | Number of courses | Courses per capita (per million people) (Note: Calculated using the golf courses data and the population figures as of 2019 by the UN, rounded up to 2 decimal places.) |
| USA | 16,752 | 50.91 |
| Japan | 3,169 | 24.98 |
| United Kingdom | 2,633 (Note: (England: 2,270, Scotland: 614)) | 38.99 |
| Canada | 2,633 | 70.38 |
| Australia | 1,616 | 64.12 |
| Germany | 1,050 | 12.57 |
| France | 804 | 12.34 |
| South Korea | 798 | 15.58 |
| Sweden | 662 | 65.96 |
| China | 599 | 0.42 |
| Spain | 497 | 10.63 |
| Ireland | 494 | 101.19 |
| South Africa | 489 | 8.35 |
| New Zealand | 418 | 87.39 |
| Argentina | 349 | 5.01 |
| Denmark | 346 | 59.94 |
| Netherlands | 330 | 19.30 |
| Italy | 321 | 5.30 |
| Thailand | 315 | 4.52 |
| Rest of the world | 4,338 | — |
| Total | 38,864 | 5.04 |

== Professional golf ==
The majority of professional golfers work as club or teaching professionals ("pros"), and only compete in local competitions. A small elite of professional golfers are "tournament pros" who compete full-time on international "tours". Many club and teaching professionals working in the golf industry start as caddies or with a general interest in the game, finding employment at golf courses and eventually moving on to certifications in their chosen profession. These programs include independent institutions and universities, and those that eventually lead to a Class A golf professional certification. Touring professionals typically start as amateur players, who attain their "pro" status after success in major tournaments that win them either prize money and/or notice from corporate sponsors. Jack Nicklaus, for example, gained widespread notice by finishing second in the 1960 U.S. Open to champion Arnold Palmer, with a 72-hole score of 282 (the best score to date in that tournament by an amateur). He played one more amateur year in 1961, winning that year's U.S. Amateur, before turning pro in 1962.

=== Instruction ===
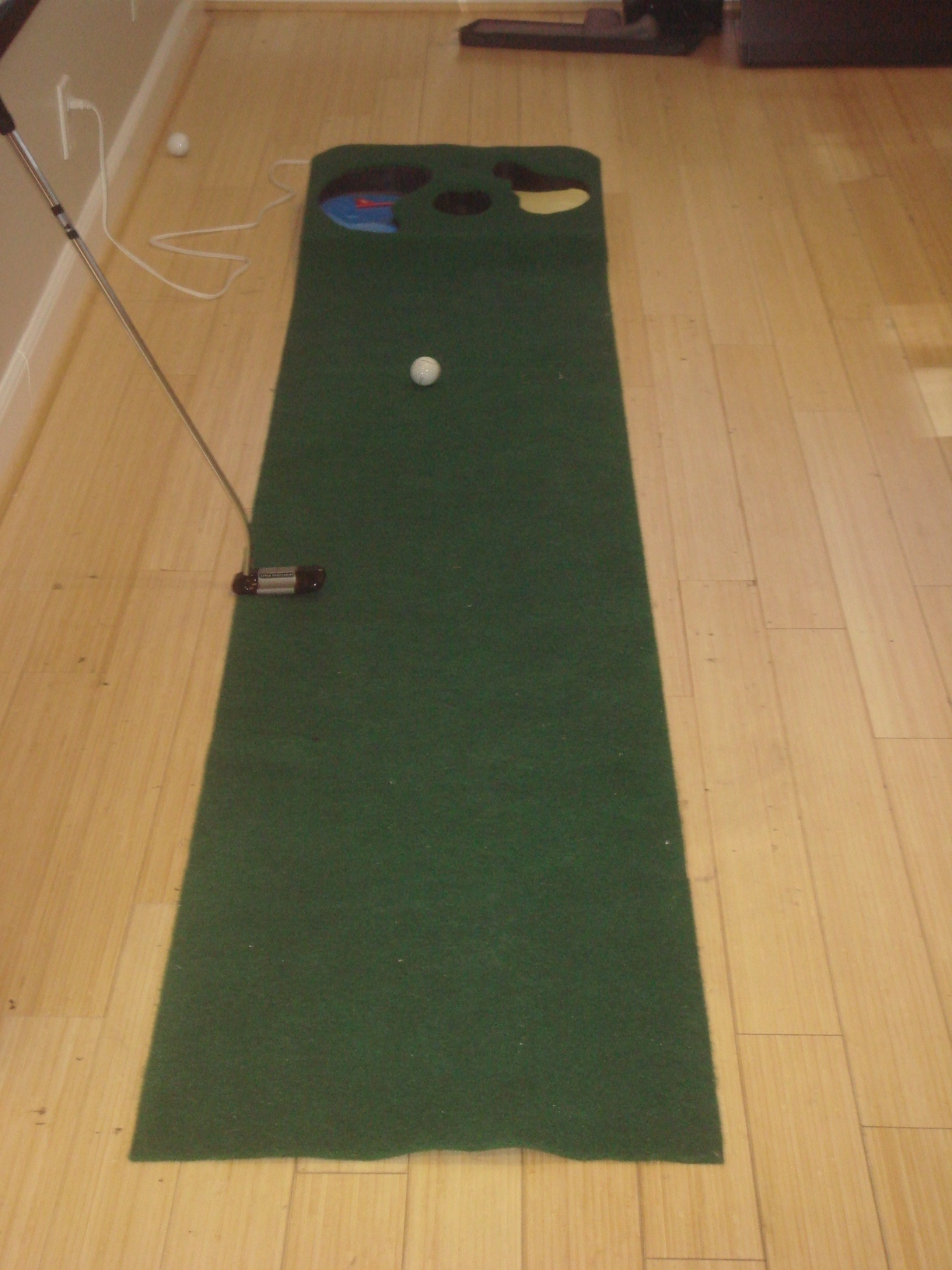
Indoor putting green for practice and instruction

Golf instruction involves the teaching and learning of the game of golf. Proficiency in teaching golf instruction requires not only technical and physical ability but also knowledge of the rules and etiquette of the game. In some countries, golf instruction is best performed by teachers certified by the Professional Golfers Association. Some top instructors who work with professional golfers have become quite well known in their own right. Professional golf instructors can use physical conditioning, mental visualization, classroom sessions, club fitting, driving range instruction, on-course play under real conditions, and review of videotaped swings in slow motion to teach golf to prepare the golfer for the course.

=== Golf tours ===
There are at least twenty professional golf tours, each run by a Professional Golfers Association or an independent tour organization, which is responsible for arranging events, finding sponsors, and regulating the tour. Typically a tour has "members" who are entitled to compete in most of its events, and also invites non-members to compete in some of them. Gaining membership of an elite tour is highly competitive, and most professional golfers never achieve it.

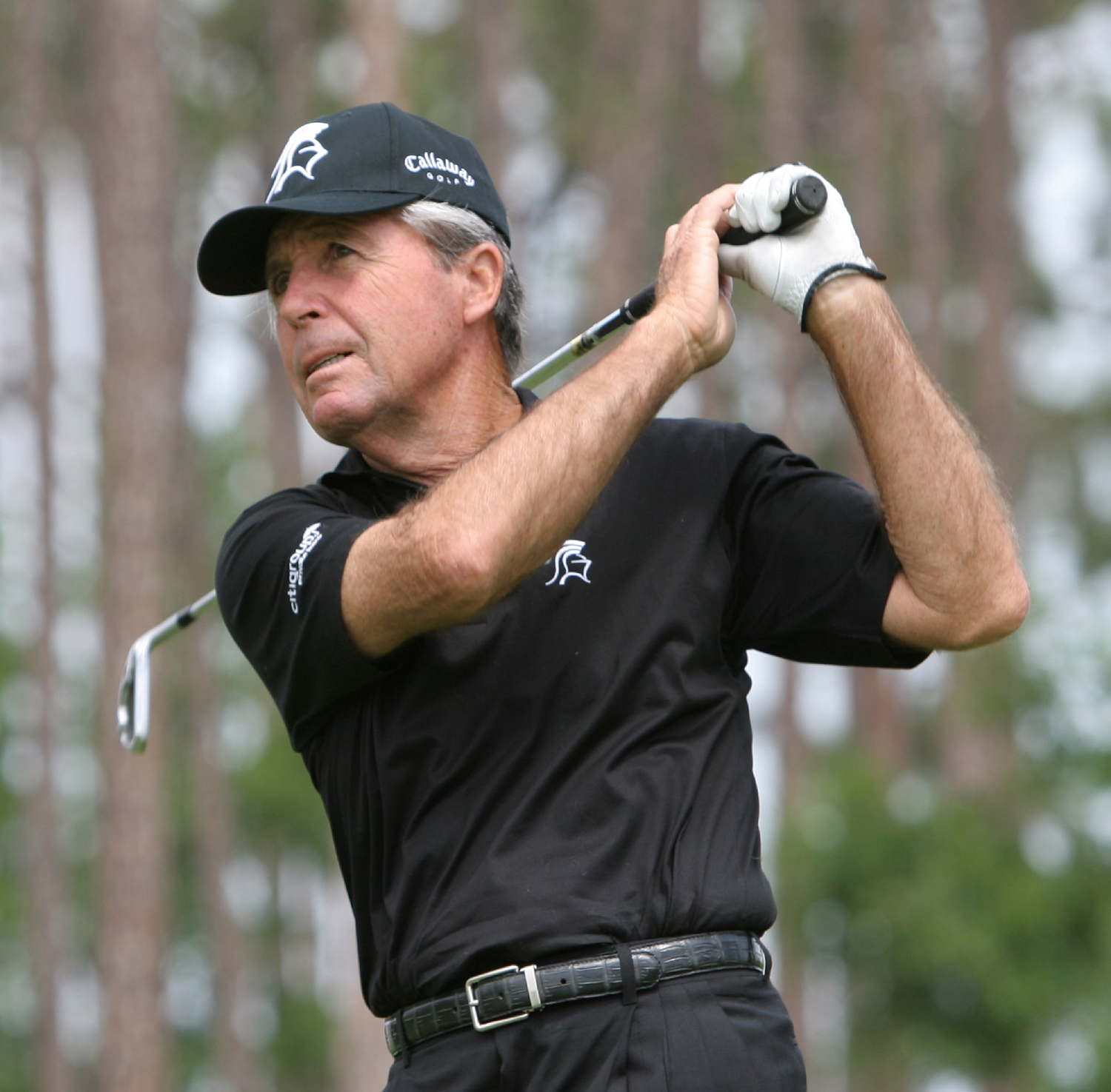
Gary Player is widely regarded as one of the greatest players in the history of golf.

Perhaps the most widely known tour is the PGA Tour, which tends to attract the strongest fields, outside the four Majors and the four World Golf Championships events. This is due mostly to the fact that most PGA Tour events have a first prize of at least 800,000 USD. The European Tour, which attracts a substantial number of top golfers from outside North America, ranks second to the PGA Tour in worldwide prestige. Some top professionals from outside North America play enough tournaments to maintain membership on both the PGA Tour and European Tour. Since 2010, both tours' money titles have been claimed by the same individual three times, with Luke Donald doing so in 2011 and Rory McIlroy in 2012 and 2014. In 2013, Henrik Stenson won the FedEx Cup points race on the PGA Tour and the European Tour money title, but did not top the PGA Tour money list (that honour going to Tiger Woods).

The other leading men's tours include the Japan Golf Tour, the Asian Tour (Asia outside Japan), the PGA Tour of Australasia, and the Sunshine Tour (based in southern Africa, primarily South Africa). The Japan, Australasian, Sunshine, PGA, and European Tours are the charter members of the trade body of the world's main tours, the International Federation of PGA Tours, founded in 1996. The Asian Tour became a full member in 1999. The Canadian Tour became an associate member of the Federation in 2000, and the Tour de las Américas (Latin America) became an associate member of the Federation in 2007. The Federation underwent a major expansion in 2009 that saw eleven new tours become full members – the Canadian Tour, Tour de las Américas, China Golf Association, the Korea Professional Golfers' Association, Professional Golf Tour of India, and the operators of all six major women's tours worldwide. In 2011, the Tour de las Américas was effectively taken over by the PGA Tour, and in 2012 was folded into the new PGA Tour Latinoamérica. Also in 2012, the Canadian Tour was renamed PGA Tour Canada after it agreed to be taken over by the PGA Tour. All men's tours that are Federation members, except the India tour, offer points in the Official World Golf Ranking (OWGR) to players who place sufficiently high in their events.

Golf is unique in having lucrative competition for older players. There are several senior tours for men aged fifty and over, arguably the best known of which is the U.S.-based PGA Tour Champions.

There are six principal tours for women, each based in a different country or continent. The most prestigious of these is the United States–based LPGA Tour. All of the principal tours offer points in the Women's World Golf Rankings for high finishers in their events.

All of the leading professional tours for under-50 players have an official developmental tour, in which the leading players at the end of the season will earn a tour card on the main tour for the following season. Examples include the Korn Ferry Tour, which feeds to the PGA Tour, and the Challenge Tour, which is the developmental tour of the European Tour. The Korn Ferry and Challenge Tours also offer OWGR points.

=== Men's major championships ===
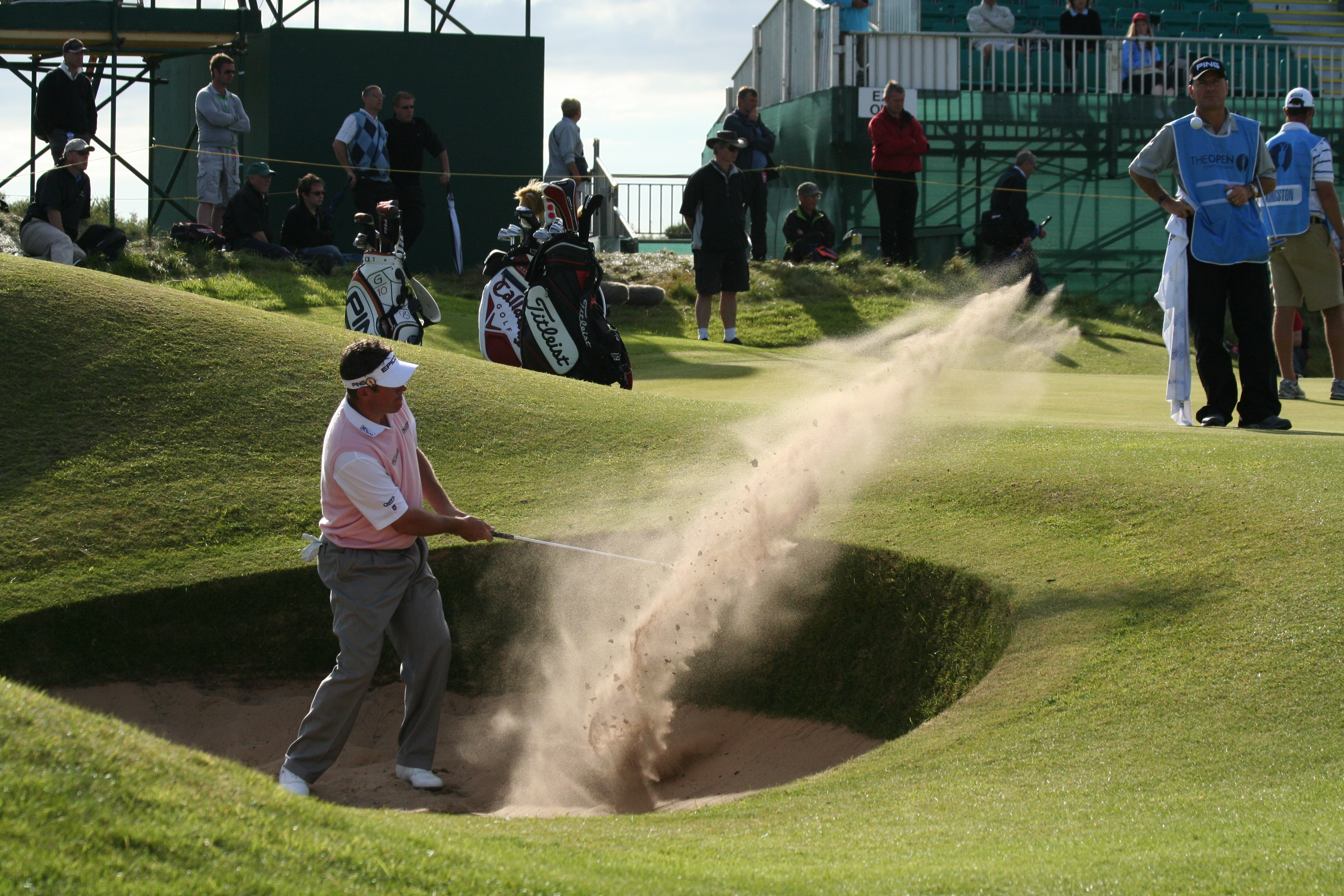
Lee Westwood pictured making a bunker shot at the 2008 Open

The major championships are the four most prestigious men's tournaments of the year. In chronological order they are: The Masters, the PGA Championship, the U.S. Open, and The Open Championship (referred to in North America as the British Open).

The fields for these events include the top several dozen golfers from all over the world. The Masters has been played at Augusta National Golf Club in Augusta, Georgia, since its inception in 1934. It is the only major championship that is played at the same course each year. The U.S. Open and PGA Championship are played at courses around the United States, while the Open Championship is played at courses around the United Kingdom.

Prior to the advent of the PGA Championship and The Masters, the four Majors were the U.S. Open, the U.S. Amateur, the Open Championship, and the British Amateur.

=== Women's major championships ===
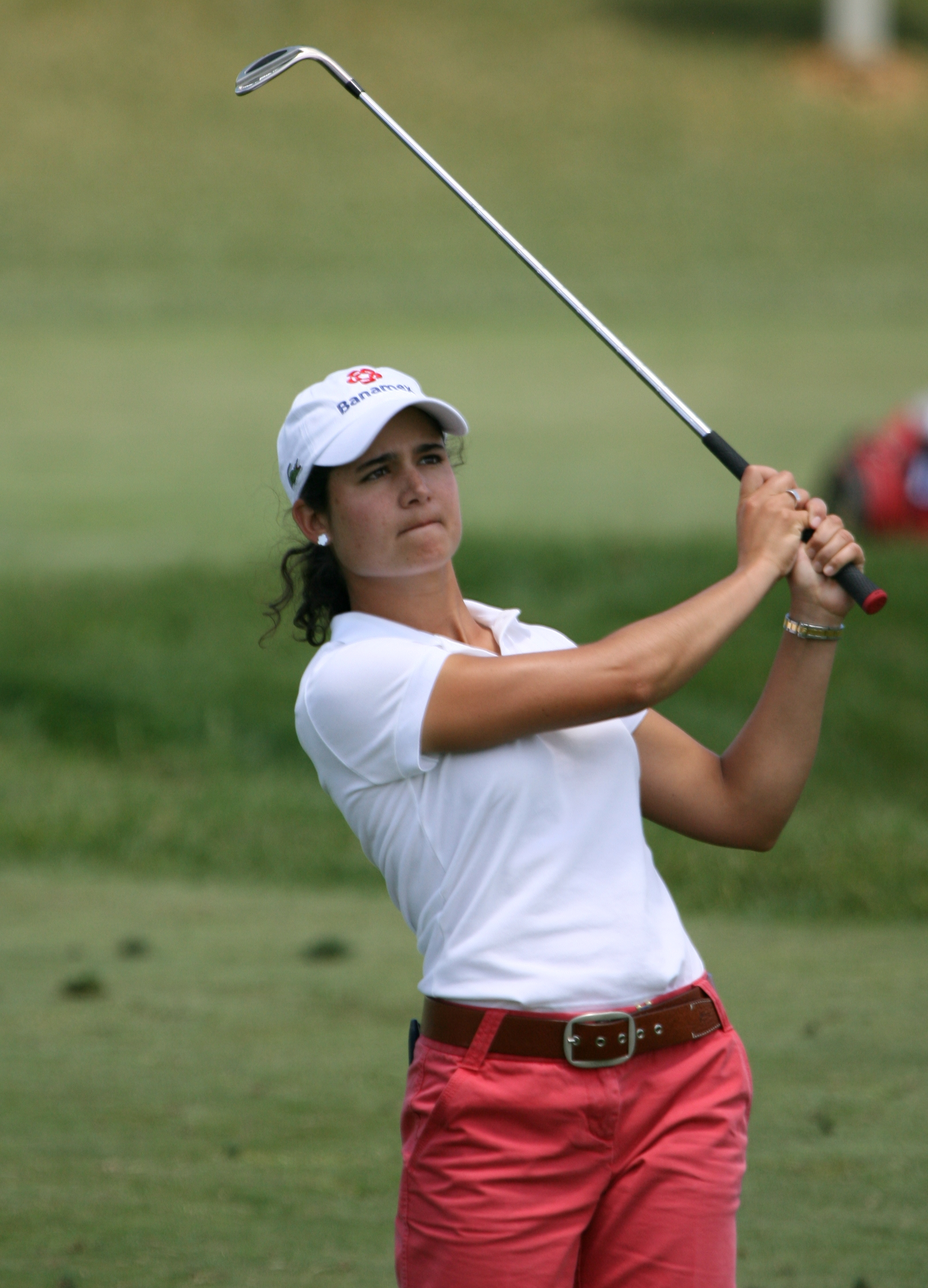
Lorena Ochoa, a retired number one female golfer, pictured here in 2007

Women's golf does not have a globally agreed set of majors. The list of majors recognised by the dominant women's tour, the LPGA Tour in the U.S., has changed several times over the years, with the most recent changes occurring in 2001 and 2013. Like the PGA Tour, the (U.S.) LPGA tour long had four majors, but now has five: the Chevron Championship (previously known by several other names, most recently the ANA Inspiration), the Women's PGA Championship (previously known as the LPGA Championship), the U.S. Women's Open, the Women's British Open (which replaced the du Maurier Classic as a major in 2001) and The Evian Championship (added as the fifth major in 2013). Only the last two are also recognised as majors by the Ladies European Tour. However, the significance of this is limited, as the LPGA is far more dominant in women's golf than the PGA Tour is in mainstream men's golf. For example, the BBC has been known to use the U.S. definition of "women's majors" without qualifying it. Also, the Ladies' Golf Union, the governing body for women's golf in Great Britain and Ireland, stated on its official website that the Women's British Open was "the only Women's Major to be played outside the U.S." (this was before the elevation of The Evian Championship to major status).

For many years, the Ladies European Tour tacitly acknowledged the dominance of the LPGA Tour by not scheduling any of its own events to conflict with the three LPGA majors played in the U.S., but that changed beginning in 2008, when the LET scheduled an event opposite the LPGA Championship. The second-richest women's tour, the LPGA of Japan Tour, does not recognise any of the U.S. LPGA or European majors as it has its own set of majors (historically three, since 2008 four). However, these events attract little notice outside Japan.

=== Senior major championships ===
Senior (aged fifty and over) men's golf does not have a globally agreed set of majors. The list of senior majors on the U.S.-based PGA Tour Champions has changed over the years, but always by expansion. PGA Tour Champions now recognises five majors: the Senior PGA Championship, The Tradition, the Senior Players Championship, the United States Senior Open, and The Senior (British) Open Championship.

Of the five events, the Senior PGA is by far the oldest, having been founded in 1937. The other events all date from the 1980s, when senior golf became a commercial success as the first golf stars of the television era, such as Arnold Palmer and Gary Player, reached the relevant age. The Senior Open Championship was not recognised as a major by PGA Tour Champions until 2003. The European Senior Tour recognises only the Senior PGA and the two Senior Opens as majors. However, PGA Tour Champions is arguably more dominant in global senior golf than the U.S. LPGA is in global women's golf.

=== Olympic Games ===
Golf was featured in the Summer Olympic Games official programme in 1900 and 1904. After a 112-year absence, golf returned for the 2016 Rio Games. The International Golf Federation (IGF) is recognised by the International Olympic Committee (IOC) as the world governing body for golf.

=== Summary of international events ===
- Golf at the Asian Games
- Curtis Cup
- EurAsia Cup
- International Crown
- Golf at the Summer Olympics
- Golf at the Pan American Games
- Presidents Cup
- Ryder Cup
- Seve Trophy
- Solheim Cup
- Golf at the Summer Universiade
- Walker Cup

== Women ==
Mary, Queen of Scots popularly became the first known woman golfer, when she was accused of playing golf near Seton Palace only a few days after Lord Darnley's murder, in 1567, though certain sources claim that this was merely a rumour.

Other reported early women golfers include two married women who, according to the Caledonian Mercury in 1738, played a match on Bruntsfield Links in Edinburgh, with their husbands acting as caddies.

In the late nineteenth century, women such as Issette Pearson (a founder of the Ladies' Golf Union) and Lady Margaret Scott (winner of the first Ladies Amateur Golf Championship in 1893) were prominent early figures in organised women's golf.

St Andrews Links, Scotland is recognised as hosting the first fully constituted ladies' golf club, since 1867, with one in Devon, England following soon after.

In 1891, the newly built Shinnecock Hills course in Southampton, New York became the first US club to offer membership to women golfers. Four years later, in 1895, The U.S. Golf Association held the first Women's Amateur Championship tournament at the Meadow Brook Golf Club.

Just like professional golfer Bobby Jones, Joyce Wethered was considered to be a star in the 1920s. Jones praised Wethered in 1930 after they had played an exhibition against each other. He doubted that there had ever been a better golfer, man or woman.

The Royal Liverpool's club refused entry of Sir Henry Cotton's wife into the clubhouse in the late 1940s. The secretary of the club released a statement saying, "No woman ever has entered the clubhouse and, praise God, no woman ever will." The following year Babe Zaharias became the first woman to attempt to qualify for the U.S. Open, but her application was rejected by the USGA. They stated that the event was intended to be open to men only.

The Ladies Professional Golf Association was formed in 1950 as a way to popularize the sport and provide competitive opportunities for golfers. In 1972 U.S. Congress passed the Title IX of the Education Amendments, which helped golf have more equal opportunities. American Renee Powell moved to the UK in the 1970s to further her career, and became the first woman to play in a British men's tournament in 1977.

As of 2025, there is still a significant pay gap in women's golf such as the LPGA and the Ladies European Tour. Golf is still one of the sports with the most pay disparity by sex, and is also one that is physically demanding for women.

== Video games ==
Golf has been adapted and simulated in video games. Nintendo's Golf (1984) is recognized as the best-selling golf video game in history. Other popular golf games include Access Software's Leader Board and Links series, EA Sports's PGA Tour series, and Sony Interactive Entertainment's Everybody's Golf (aka Hot Shots Golf).

== See also ==
- Glossary of golf
- Outline of golf
- Lists of golfers
- List of golf courses in the United Kingdom
- Professional Golfers' Association of America
- Pitch and putt
- Miniature golf
- Variations of golf
