= Mission Hills Haikou =

Golf complex in Hainan, China

Coordinates: 19.905375°N 110.310699°E

Mission Hills Haikou
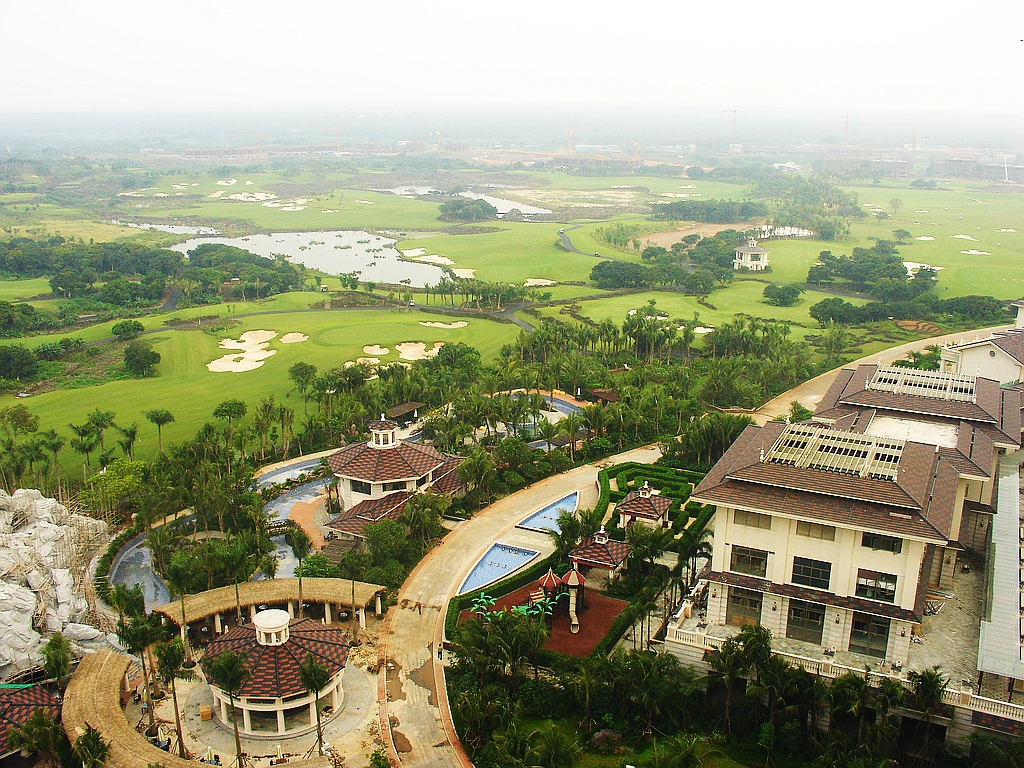

- Interactive map of Mission Hills Haikou

Club information
- Location: Hainan, People's Republic of China
- Type: Private
- Owner: Mission Hills Group
- Website: www.missionhillschina.com

Mission Hills Haikou is a golf complex in Haikou, Hainan, China. Located around 10 km south of the center of Haikou, it comprises 10 golf courses, and at the north end, hotels including a Ritz Carlton and Renaissance, condominiums, a water park, and a Centreville (downtown) which includes numerous restaurants and shops. The site is 20 km^{2}, making it the second largest golf complex in the world. The largest is the Mission Hills Golf Club in Shenzhen.

== History ==
Construction started in 2006 but stopped for several months during 2008 because of land disputes. As of 2018, the complex is nearly complete.

== Events ==
The complex hosted the 2010 Mission Hills Star Trophy and the 2011 Omega Mission Hills World Cup.

The 2012 Mission Hills World Celebrity Pro-Am began was held in October 2012. The purse was US$1 million.

== Other facilities ==
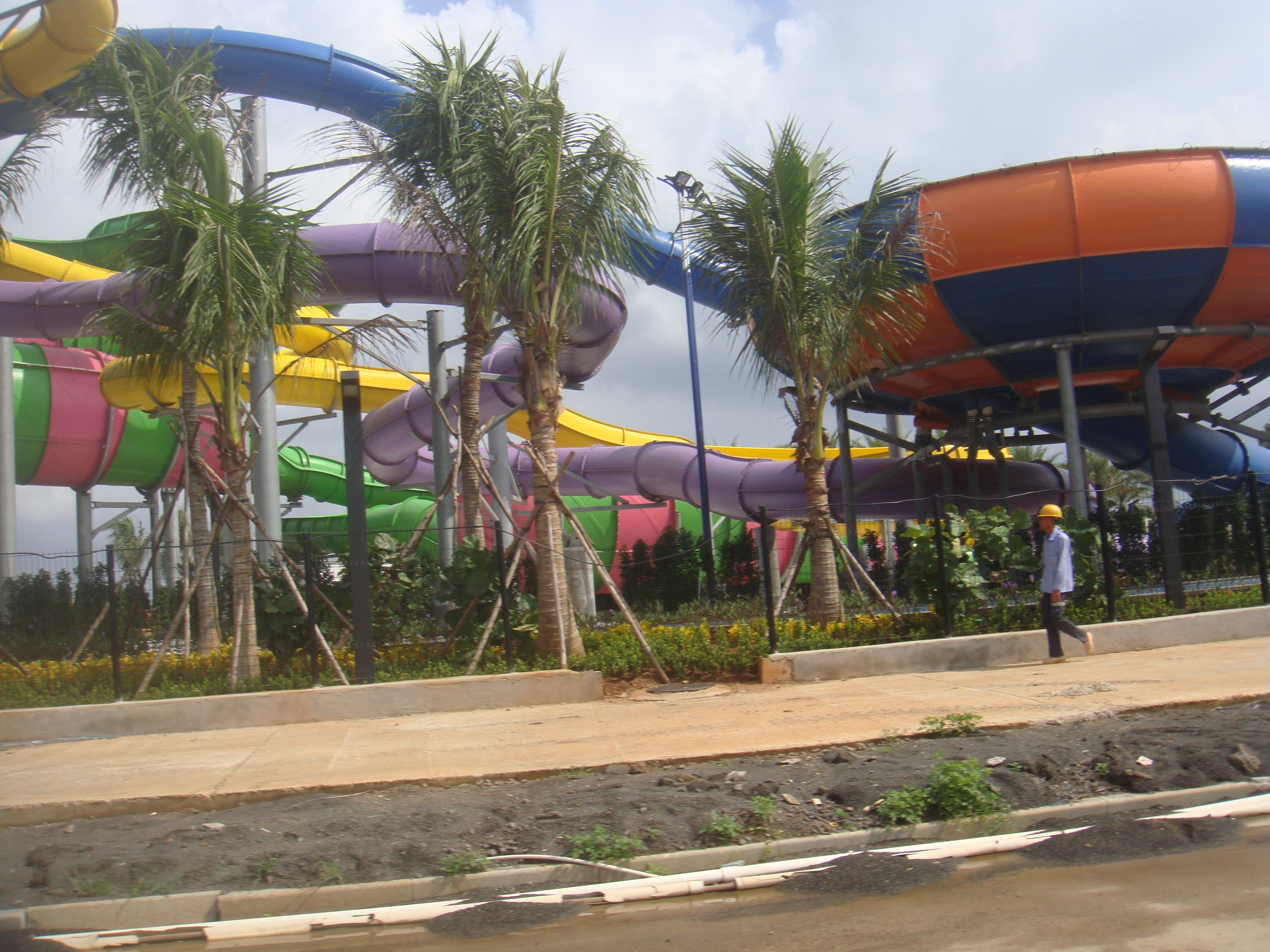
Wet'n'Wild Water Park under construction in October 2017

The complex has a movie theatre, a sports and recreation centre, tennis courts, and the Wet'n'Wild water park operated by Village Roadshow. There is also a natural mineral springs, a spa, and a shopping arcade.

== See also ==
- Mission Hills Golf Club
