= 2011 in golf =

This article summarizes the highlights of professional and amateur golf in the year 2011.

== Men's professional golf ==
Major championships

- 7–10 April: The Masters – South African Charl Schwartzel won his first major title with a two stroke margin over Australians Adam Scott and Jason Day.
- 16–19 June: U.S. Open – Northern Irishman Rory McIlroy won with an eight stroke victory over Australian Jason Day for his first major win.
- 14–17 July: The Open Championship – Northern Irishman Darren Clarke won his first major championship by three strokes over Americans Dustin Johnson and Phil Mickelson.
- 11–14 August: PGA Championship – American rookie Keegan Bradley won his first major championship in his first major start, beating Jason Dufner in a three-hole playoff.

World Golf Championships

- 23–27 February: WGC-Accenture Match Play Championship – Englishman Luke Donald won his first WGC tournament, beating German Martin Kaymer 3&2.
- 10–13 March WGC-Cadillac Championship – American Nick Watney won his first WGC tournament with a two-stroke margin over compatriot Dustin Johnson.
- 4–7 August: WGC-Bridgestone Invitational – Adam Scott won his first WGC tournament by four strokes over Luke Donald and Rickie Fowler.
- 3–6 November: WGC-HSBC Champions – Martin Kaymer won his first WGC tournament by three strokes over Swede Freddie Jacobson.

FedEx Cup playoff events – see 2011 FedEx Cup Playoffs

- 25–28 August: The Barclays – Dustin Johnson won by two strokes over defending champion Matt Kuchar. The tournament was shortened to 54 holes in anticipation of Hurricane Irene.
- 2–5 September: Deutsche Bank Championship – Webb Simpson won on the second hole of a sudden-death playoff over Chez Reavie.
- 15–18 September: BMW Championship – Justin Rose won by two stroke over John Senden.
- 22–25 September: Tour Championship – Bill Haas won on the third playoff hole over Hunter Mahan.

Other leading PGA Tour events

- 12–15 May: The Players Championship – South Korea's K. J. Choi defeated American David Toms on the first playoff hole to claim the title.

For a complete list of PGA Tour results see 2011 PGA Tour.

Leading European Tour events

- 26–29 May: BMW PGA Championship – Englishman Luke Donald defeated compatriot and World Ranking Number 1 Lee Westwood on the first playoff hole to claim the title and become the new World Ranking Number 1.
- 8–11 December: Dubai World Championship – Álvaro Quirós of Spain eagled the 72nd hole to claim a two shot victory over Paul Lawrie.

For a complete list of European Tour results see 2011 European Tour.

Team events

- 7–9 January: Royal Trophy – Team Europe defeated Team Asia 9–7 for its second consecutive win and fourth in the event's five editions.
- 15–18 September: Vivendi Seve Trophy – Team Great Britain and Ireland defeated team Continental Europe, 15½ to 12½, for the sixth consecutive time.
- 17–20 November: Presidents Cup – The American team defeated the International team 19–15. It was the fourth consecutive win in this event for the Americans.
- 24–27 November: Omega Mission Hills World Cup – The American team of Matt Kuchar and Gary Woodland won giving the United States their 24th win in the World Cup.

Tour leaders

- PGA Tour – (England) Luke Donald (US$6,683,214)
  - This total does not include FedEx Cup bonuses.
- European Tour – (England) Luke Donald (€5,323,400)
  - This total includes the US$1.5 million (€1,107,174) bonus for winning the Race to Dubai.
- Japan Golf Tour – (South Korea) Bae Sang-moon (¥151,078,958)
- Asian Tour – (Philippines) Juvic Pagunsan (US$788,299)
- PGA Tour of Australasia – (Australia) Greg Chalmers (A$554,285)
- Sunshine Tour – (South Africa) Garth Mulroy (R3,464,463)
- OneAsia Tour – (Australia) Andre Stolz (US$464,812)

Awards

- PGA Tour
  - FedEx Cup – Bill Haas won the FedEx Cup after winning the Tour Championship in a playoff over Hunter Mahan.
  - PGA Player of the Year – (England) Luke Donald
  - Player of the Year (Jack Nicklaus Trophy) – (England) Luke Donald
  - Leading money winner (Arnold Palmer Award) – (England) Luke Donald
  - Vardon Trophy – (England) Luke Donald
  - Byron Nelson Award – (England) Luke Donald
  - Rookie of the Year – (United States) Keegan Bradley
  - Comeback Player of the Year – None
  - Payne Stewart Award – (United States) David Toms
- European Tour
  - Golfer of the Year – (England) Luke Donald
  - Rookie of the Year – (England) Tom Lewis
- Nationwide Tour
  - Player of the Year – (United States) J. J. Killeen

Other tour results

- 2011 Asian Tour
- 2011 PGA Tour of Australasia
- 2011 Canadian Tour
- 2011 Challenge Tour
- 2011 Japan Golf Tour
- 2011 Nationwide Tour
- 2011 OneAsia Tour
- 2011 Sunshine Tour
- 2011 Tour de las Américas

Other happenings

- 27 February – Martin Kaymer became the new world Number 1 succeeding Lee Westwood after finishing second in the WGC-Accenture Match Play Championship. He was the first German World number 1 after Bernhard Langer.
- 12 April – The Sunshine Tour announced that it will host a new World Golf Championships tournament starting in 2012. The event, to be called the Tournament of Hope, is expected to be played in December and is planned to have a purse of US$10 million, the richest in the sport.
- 24 April – Lee Westwood replaced Martin Kaymer as world Number 1 after winning the Indonesian Masters on the Asian Tour.
- 30 May – Luke Donald became the new world Number 1 after winning the BMW PGA Championship, by defeating former world Number 1 Lee Westwood on the first hole of the playoff.
- 4 December – Tiger Woods won the unofficial event he hosts, the Chevron World Challenge, chasing down Zach Johnson with birdies on the final two holes. This was his first professional tournament win since his 2009 sex scandal.

== Women's professional golf ==
LPGA majors

- 31 March – 3 April: Kraft Nabisco Championship – American Stacy Lewis defeated defending champion and current world number one Yani Tseng by three strokes to claim her first professional win.
- 23–26 June: Wegmans LPGA Championship – Yani Tseng from Taiwan won by 10 strokes over American Morgan Pressel. It was Tseng's third LPGA Tour win in 2011 and her seventh professional win of the year. If was also Tseng's fourth career major win, which made her the youngest golfer, male or female, in the modern era to win four majors.
- 7–10 July: U.S. Women's Open – So Yeon Ryu of South Korean defeated compatriot Hee Kyung Seo in a three-hole playoff. It was Ryu's first win in an LPGA Tour event.
- 28–31 July: Ricoh Women's British Open – Yani Tseng defended her title with a four-stroke win over American Brittany Lang. The win made Tseng the youngest player ever, male or female, to win five major championships.

Ladies European Tour major (in addition to the Women's British Open)

- 21–24 July: Evian Masters – Ai Miyazato of Japan won her seventh LPGA Tour title with a two-stroke victory over American Stacy Lewis.

For a complete list of Ladies European Tour results see 2011 Ladies European Tour.

Additional LPGA Tour events

- 17–20 December: CME Group Titleholders – South Korean Hee Young Park claimed her first win on LPGA Tour with two stroke margin over Sandra Gal and Paula Creamer.

For a complete list of LPGA Tour results, see 2011 LPGA Tour.

Team events

- 23–25 September: Solheim Cup – Europe reclaimed the Cup by a score of 15–13. It was the first win for Europe since 2003 and Europe's fourth victory in the 12-tournament history of the Solheim Cup.

Money list leaders

- LPGA Tour – (Taiwan) Yani Tseng (US$2,921,713)
- LPGA of Japan Tour – (South Korea) Ahn Sun-ju (¥127,926,893)
- Ladies European Tour – (Japan) Ai Miyazato (€363,079.68)
- LPGA of Korea Tour – (South Korea) Kim Ha-Neul (₩524,297,417)
- Ladies Asian Golf Tour – (Taiwan) Yani Tseng (US$62,550)
- ALPG Tour – (Australia) Kristie Smith (A$60,033) (2010/11 season)
- LPGA Futures Tour – (United States) Kathleen Ekey (US$66,412)

Awards

- LPGA Tour Player of the Year – (Taiwan) Yani Tseng
- LPGA Tour Rookie of the Year – (South Korea) Hee Kyung Seo
- LPGA Tour Vare Trophy – (Taiwan) Yani Tseng
- LET Player of the Year – (Sweden) Caroline Hedwall
- LET Rookie of the Year – (Sweden) Caroline Hedwall

Other tour results

- 2011 LPGA Futures Tour
- 2011 Ladies Asian Golf Tour
- 2011 LPGA of Japan Tour
- 2011 LPGA of Korea Tour

Other happenings

- 14 February – Yani Tseng moved to number one in the Women's World Golf Rankings, surpassing Jiyai Shin who had held the position for the previous 15 weeks. Tseng's move to number one came after winning back-to-back events in Australia on the ALPG Tour and Ladies European Tour.
- 26 June – After winning the LPGA Championship for her fourth career major, 22-year-old Yani Tseng became the youngest player, male or female, in the modern era to win four majors.
- 20 July – The LPGA announced that the Evian Masters will become that tour's fifth major starting in 2013. The tournament will move to September, becoming the season's last major, and would be renamed "The Evian". (The tournament would later be slightly renamed as "The Evian Championship".)
- 18 September – 16-year-old Lexi Thompson won the Navistar LPGA Classic, becoming the youngest player to win an LPGA tournament. She broke the previous record for multi-round tournament that was set by 18-year-old Paula Creamer in 2005.

== Senior men's professional golf ==
Senior majors

- 5–8 May: Regions Tradition – American Tom Lehman defeated Australian Peter Senior on the second playoff hole to claim his third Champions Tour title of the season and second career senior major.
- 26–29 May: Senior PGA Championship – American Tom Watson defeated countryman David Eger on the first playoff hole to claim his sixth career senior major. The 61-year-old Watson also became the oldest winner of a senior major since the creation of the Champions Tour in 1980.
- 21–24 July: The Senior Open Championship – American Russ Cochran won his first senior major, finishing two shots clear of fellow American Mark Calcavecchia.
- 28–31 July: U.S. Senior Open -American Olin Browne won his first senior major by three shots over countryman Mark O'Meara.
- 18–21 August: Senior Players Championship – American Fred Couples won his first senior major, defeating countryman John Cook on the third playoff hole.

Full results

- 2011 Champions Tour
- 2011 European Senior Tour

Money list leaders

- Champions Tour – American Tom Lehman topped the money list for the first time with earnings of US$2,081,526.
- European Senior Tour – Australian Peter Fowler led the Order of Merit with earnings of €302,327.

Awards

- Champions Tour
  - Charles Schwab Cup – (United States) Tom Lehman
  - Player of the Year – (United States) Tom Lehman
  - Rookie of the Year – (United States) Kenny Perry
  - Comeback Player of the Year – (United States) Chip Beck
  - Leading money winner (Arnold Palmer Award) – (United States) Tom Lehman ($2,081,526)
  - Lowest stroke average (Byron Nelson Award) – (United States) Mark Calcavecchia (69.04)

== Amateur golf ==
- 17–21 May: NCAA Division I Women's Golf Championships – UCLA won its third team championship. Austin Ernst of LSU won the individual title.
- 31 May – 5 June: NCAA Division I Men's Golf Championships – Augusta State successfully defended its team championship, with LSU's John Peterson winning the individual title.
- 13–18 June: The Amateur Championship – Bryden Macpherson became the first Australian in over 50 years to win The Amateur, beating Scotsman Michael Stewart in the final.
- 8–14 August: U.S. Women's Amateur – American Danielle Kang won her second consecutive U.S. Women's Amateur, beating Thailand's Moriya Jutanugarn.
- 22–28 August: U.S. Amateur – American Kelly Kraft beat countryman Patrick Cantlay, the top ranked amateur, in the final, 2 up.
- 10–11 September Walker Cup – Great Britain and Ireland defeated the United States, 14 to 12.

Other happenings

== World Golf Hall of Fame inductees ==
On 22 July 2010, the Hall of Fame announced that it would move future induction ceremonies from October/November to May, on the Monday before The Players Championship. The 2011 class was inducted on 9 May:

- (South Africa) Ernie Els (PGA Tour)
- (Japan) Masashi "Jumbo" Ozaki (International)
- (United States) Doug Ford (Veterans)
- (Scotland) (United States) Jock Hutchison (Veterans)
- (United States) George H. W. Bush (Lifetime Achievement)
- (United States) Frank Chirkinian (Lifetime Achievement)

== Deaths ==
- 1 January – Billy Joe Patton (born 1922), amateur golfer who almost won the 1954 Masters Tournament
- 20 February – Betty Hicks (born 1920), 1941 U.S. Women's Amateur winner, LPGA co-founder
- 21 February – Bob Boyd (born 1955), PGA Tour and European Seniors Tour golfer
- 4 March – Frank Chirkinian (born 1926), American TV producer credited as the "father of televised golf" and 2011 Hall of Fame inductee
- 8 April – Sam Urzetta (born 1926), 1950 U.S. Amateur winner
- 18 April – Mason Rudolph (born 1934), five-time PGA Tour winner
- 7 May – Seve Ballesteros (born 1957), Spanish Hall of Fame golfer; winner of two Masters and three Open Championships
- 11 July – Alex Hay (born 1933), Scottish golf broadcaster and club pro
- 24 August – Paul Harney (born 1929), six-time PGA Tour winner
- 28 August – Cesar Sanudo (born 1943), PGA Tour winner
- 27 September – Dave Hill (born 1937), 13-time PGA Tour winner
- 1 October – Sven Tumba (born 1931), Swedish professional golfer, golf course architect, and promoter
- 14 October – Adam Hunter (born 1963), European Tour winner
- 3 December – James A. Barclay (born 1923), golf historian, Canadian Golf Hall of Fame member
- 22 December – Bettye Danoff (born 1923), LPGA co-founder
- 28 December – Teruo Sugihara (born 1937), 28-time Japan Golf Tour winner

== Table of results ==
This table summarizes all the results referred to above in date order.

Dates	Tournament	Status or tour	Winner
7–9 Jan	Royal Trophy	Europe v Asia men's professional team event	Europe
23–27 Feb	WGC-Accenture Match Play Championship	World Golf Championships	(England) Luke Donald
10–13 Mar	WGC-Cadillac Championship	World Golf Championships	(United States) Nick Watney
31 Mar – 3 Apr	Kraft Nabisco Championship	LPGA major	(United States) Stacy Lewis
7–10 Apr	The Masters	Men's major	(South Africa) Charl Schwartzel
5–8 May	Regions Tradition	Senior major	(United States) Tom Lehman
12–15 May	The Players Championship	PGA Tour	(South Korea) K. J. Choi
17–21 May	NCAA Division I Women's Golf Championships	U.S. college championship	UCLA / Austin Ernst
26–29 May	BMW PGA Championship	European Tour	(England) Luke Donald
26–29 May	Senior PGA Championship	Senior major	(United States) Tom Watson
31 May – 5 Jun	NCAA Division I Men's Golf Championships	U.S. college championship	Augusta State / John Peterson
13–18 Jun	The Amateur Championship	Amateur men's individual tournament	(Australia) Bryden Macpherson
16–19 Jun	U.S. Open	Men's major	(Northern Ireland) Rory McIlroy
23–26 Jun	Wegmans LPGA Championship	LPGA major	(Taiwan) Yani Tseng
7–10 Jul	U.S. Women's Open	LPGA major	(South Korea) So Yeon Ryu
14–17 Jul	The Open Championship	Men's major	(Northern Ireland) Darren Clarke
21–24 Jul	Evian Masters	Ladies European Tour major and LPGA Tour regular event	(Japan) Ai Miyazato
21–24 Jul	The Senior Open Championship	Senior major	(United States) Russ Cochran
28–31 Jul	Ricoh Women's British Open	LPGA and Ladies European Tour major	(Taiwan) Yani Tseng
28–31 Jul	U.S. Senior Open	Senior major	(United States) Olin Browne
4–7 Aug	WGC-Bridgestone Invitational	World Golf Championships	(Australia) Adam Scott
8–14 Aug	U.S. Women's Amateur	Amateur women's individual tournament	(United States) Danielle Kang
11–14 Aug	PGA Championship	Men's major	(United States) Keegan Bradley
18–21 Aug	Constellation Energy Senior Players Championship	Senior major	(United States) Fred Couples
22–28 Aug	U.S. Amateur	Amateur men's individual tournament	(United States) Kelly Kraft
25–28 Aug	The Barclays	PGA Tour FedEx Cup playoff	(United States) Dustin Johnson
2–5 Sep	Deutsche Bank Championship	PGA Tour FedEx Cup playoff	(United States) Webb Simpson
10–11 Sep	Walker Cup	Great Britain & Ireland v United States men's amateur team event	(United Kingdom) Great Britain & (Republic of Ireland) Ireland
15–18 Sep	Vivendi Seve Trophy	Great Britain & Ireland v Continental Europe men's professional team event	(United Kingdom) Great Britain & (Republic of Ireland) Ireland
15–18 Sep	BMW Championship	PGA Tour FedEx Cup playoff	(England) Justin Rose
22–25 Sep	The Tour Championship	PGA Tour FedEx Cup playoff	(United States) Bill Haas
23–25 Sep	Solheim Cup	Europe v United States women's professional team event	Europe
3–6 Nov	WGC-HSBC Champions	World Golf Championships	(Germany) Martin Kaymer
17–20 Nov	CME Group Titleholders	LPGA Tour	(South Korea) Hee Young Park
17–20 Nov	Presidents Cup	International v United States men's professional team event	United States
24–27 Nov	Omega Mission Hills World Cup	Men's professional national team event	United States
8–11 Dec	Dubai World Championship	European Tour	(Spain) Álvaro Quirós

The following biennial events will next be played in 2012: Ryder Cup, Curtis Cup, Eisenhower Trophy, Espirito Santo Trophy.
