= Rebecca Artis =

Australian professional golfer (born 1988)

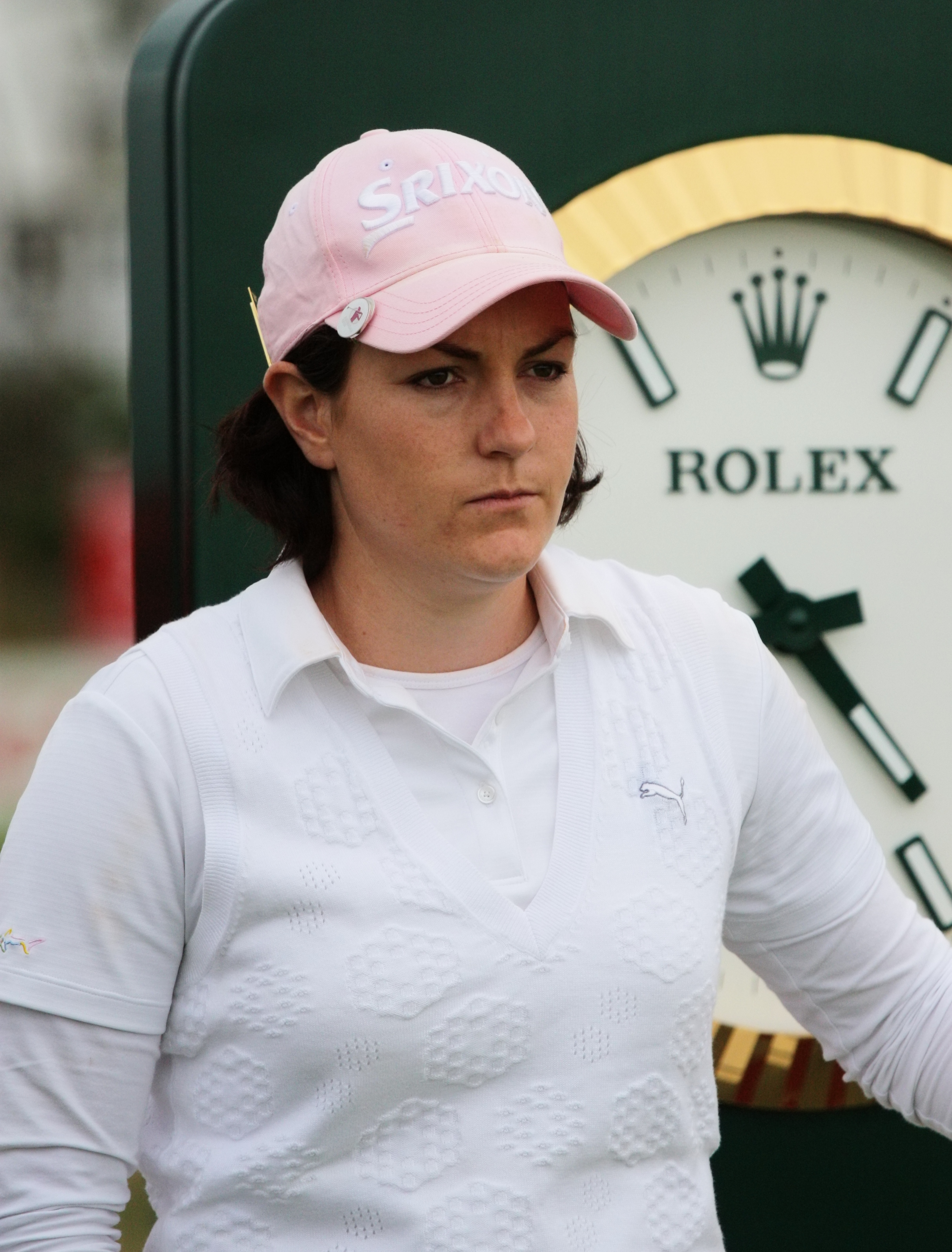

Personal information
- Nationality: Australia
- Born: 21 November 1988 (age 37) Coonabarabran, Australia
- Height: 1.73 m (5 ft 8 in)

Career
- Sport: Golf
- Turned professional: 2010
- Current tours: Ladies European Tour; LPGA Tour
- Professional wins: 2

Number of wins by tour
- Ladies European Tour: 2

Best results in LPGA major championships
- Chevron Championship: DNP
- Women's PGA C'ship: CUT: 2018
- U.S. Women's Open: DNP
- Women's British Open: T61: 2018
- Evian Championship: CUT: 2014

Rebecca Artis (born 21 November 1988) is an Australian professional golfer who plays on the Ladies European Tour.

== Professional career ==
Artis turned professional in 2010 having played in the 2009 Ricoh Women's British Open as an amateur.

Artis has played on the Ladies European Tour since turning professional and won her first professional event at the 2013 Helsingborg Open in Sweden.

Her second professional win came at the 2015 Ladies Scottish Open at Dundonald Links in 2015, Artis shot a final round 66 to win by two strokes, having trailed Suzann Pettersen by 6 strokes going into the final round.

Artis earned her 2018 LPGA Tour card through qualifying school.

== Professional wins (2) ==
=== Ladies European Tour wins (2) ===
No.	Date	Tournament	Winning score	To par	Margin of victory	Runner-up	Winner's share (€)
1	8 Sep 2013	Helsingborg Open	69-71-71-69=280	−8	1 stroke	(Sweden) Caroline Hedwall	37,500
2	26 Jul 2015	Aberdeen Asset Management Ladies Scottish Open	75-69-66=210	−6	2 strokes	(Norway) Suzann Pettersen	75,000

== Results in LPGA majors ==
Results not in chronological order before 2018.

Tournament	2009	2010	2011	2012	2013	2014	2015	2016	2017	2018
ANA Inspiration										
U.S. Women's Open										
Women's PGA Championship										CUT
Women's British Open		CUT		CUT			CUT	CUT		T61
The Evian Championship ^						CUT				

^ The Evian Championship was added as a major in 2013

Did not play

CUT = missed the half-way cut
"T" = tied

== Team appearances ==
Professional

- International Crown (representing Australia): 2016
