= Martin Kaymer =

German professional golfer (born 1984)

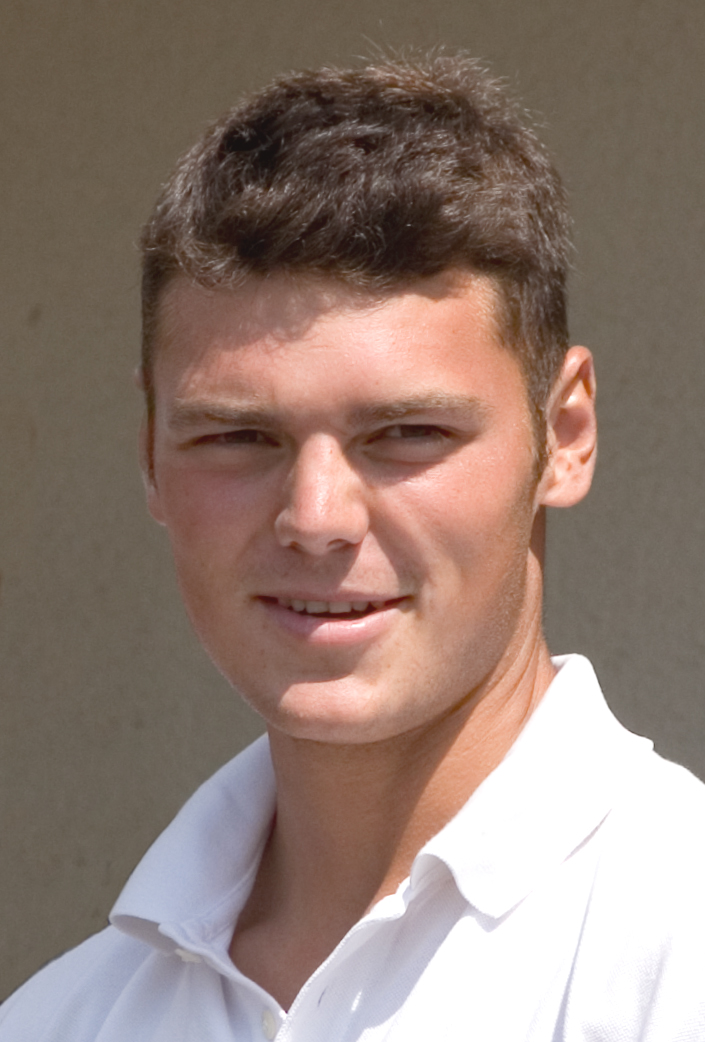
- Kaymer in 2006

Personal information
- Nationality: Germany
- Born: 28 December 1984 (age 41) Düsseldorf, West Germany
- Height: 1.84 m (6 ft 0 in)
- Weight: 74 kg (163 lb)
- Spouse: Irene Scholz (m. 2022)
- Children: 1

Career
- Sport: Golf
- Turned professional: 2005
- Current tour: LIV Golf
- Former tours: PGA Tour; European Tour; Challenge Tour; EPD Tour
- Professional wins: 23
- Highest ranking: 1 (27 February 2011) (8 weeks)

Number of wins by tour
- PGA Tour: 3
- European Tour: 11
- Sunshine Tour: 1
- Challenge Tour: 2
- Other: 8

Best results in major championships (wins: 2)
- Masters Tournament: T16: 2017
- PGA Championship: Won: 2010
- U.S. Open: Won: 2014
- The Open Championship: T7: 2010

Achievements and awards
- EPD Tour Order of Merit winner: 2006
- Sir Henry Cotton Rookie of the Year: 2007
- European Tour Race to Dubai winner: 2010
- European Tour Golfer of the Year: 2010
- European Tour Players' Player of the Year: 2010

Martin Kaymer (/ˈkaɪmər/ German: [ˈkaɪmɐ]; born 28 December 1984) is a German professional golfer who currently plays on the LIV Golf League. A winner of two major championships, he was also the No. 1 ranked golfer in the Official World Golf Ranking for eight weeks in 2011.

Kaymer achieved his first major victory at the 2010 PGA Championship, which he won over Bubba Watson in a 3-hole playoff. That same year, he was also awarded the European Tour's Harry Vardon Trophy for winning the Race to Dubai. He also won the 2011 WGC-HSBC Champions.

Kaymer is also hailed for sinking a putt on the 18th hole at Medinah Country Club on the final day of the 2012 Ryder Cup, which helped win the cup for Europe and overturned a four-point deficit against the United States at the start of the final day's play.

In May 2014, Kaymer won The Players Championship, the flagship event of the PGA Tour. A month later, he led each round of the 2014 U.S. Open and won his second major by eight strokes.

== Early life ==
Kaymer was born on 28 December 1984 in Düsseldorf, West Germany, he turned professional at age 20 in 2005 and is a member of the European Tour.

== Amateur career ==
Kaymer picked up his first professional win at the age of 20 as an amateur at the Central German Classic in 2005 on the third-tier EPD Tour. He shot a −19 (67-64-66=197) to win the tournament by a margin of five strokes.

== Professional career ==
=== Developmental tours ===
Kaymer played full-time on the EPD Tour in 2006 from February to August. He played in 14 tournaments and picked up five victories. He finished in the top-10 in all but two of the tournaments. Kaymer won the Order of Merit on the EPD Tour in 2006 by earning €26,664.

Kaymer shot a round of 59 (−13) in the second round of the Habsburg Classic. This was his scorecard:

Hole	1	2	3	4	5	6	7	8	9	Out	10	11	12	13	14	15	16	17	18	In	Total
Par	4	3	4	5	4	4	4	3	5	36	4	5	3	4	4	4	3	5	4	36	72
Score	4	4	3	4	3	3	4	2	4	31	3	3	2	4	3	3	2	5	3	28	59

Due to his success on the EPD Tour, Kaymer received an invitation to compete in and then won his first event as a professional on the Challenge Tour, the Vodafone Challenge in his native Germany. He played in eight events from August to October winning again a month later at the Open des Volcans in France. He ended up finishing 4th on the Order of Merit list despite playing in only eight events. In all he earned €93,321. He finished in the top 5 in six tournaments, and his worst finish was a 13th-place finish. Due to Kaymer's success on the Challenge Tour, he earned a European Tour card for 2007.

=== European Tour ===
Kaymer has won 11 tournaments on the European Tour including four in 2010 to win for the first time the Race to Dubai, formerly the Order of Merit. Among those wins was the PGA Championship in the United States, which made him only the second German (after Bernhard Langer) to win a major championship. He also won the WGC-HSBC Champions to become the 10th player to win both a major title and a World Golf Championship event. In 2014, he won his second major championship, the U.S. Open at Pinehurst.

Kaymer made his debut on the European Tour in 2007 at the UBS Hong Kong Open, but he failed to make the cut. He missed the cut in his first five events of the season. In March, Kaymer made his first cut of the season at the Singapore Masters; he finished in a tie for 20th place. In his first seven events of the season, he only made one cut. All of those events were played outside of Europe.

Kaymer found immediate success once he started playing in Europe again. He finished in a tie for 15th at the Madeira Island Open, which was the season's first Tour event played in Europe. The following week, he finished in a tie for 3rd at the Portuguese Open. He made seven consecutive cuts from 23 March to 1 June. During that streak, his worst finish was a tie for 35th and he recorded five top 25 finishes.

From 7 June to 9 September, Kaymer played in nine tournaments but only made two cuts. In the two tournaments where he made the cut, he did very well. Kaymer finished in a tie for 7th at the Open de France. Seven weeks later, he finished in a tie for 2nd at the Scandinavian Masters.

Kaymer played in six of the last eight events of the season. He made the cut in all six of those events. On 18 October 2007 at the Portugal Masters, Kaymer shot a first round of 61 (−11). This round tied the lowest round of the 2007 European Tour season. It was also the new course record at the Oceânico Victoria Clube de Golfe. He went on to finish in a tie for 7th. Two weeks later at the year-ending Volvo Masters, he finished in 6th place. The Volvo Masters had one of the strongest fields on tour in 2007. He earned €140,000 for his 6th-place finish, which was Kaymer's largest payout from a tournament to that time.

Kaymer earned €754,691 for the 2007 season, finishing as the highest-ranked rookie on the Order of Merit, in 41st position, and won the Sir Henry Cotton Rookie of the Year Award. He is the first German to win the award. Kaymer recorded five top 10s on the season. These performances took him into the top 100 of the Official World Golf Ranking for the first time. In November 2007 he moved into the top 75, overtaking Bernhard Langer to become the highest-ranked German golfer.

On 2 November, Kaymer signed with Sportyard, a sports management company based in Sweden. He represented Germany at the 2007 Omega Mission Hills World Cup with four-time European Tour winner Alex Čejka; they tied for sixth place.

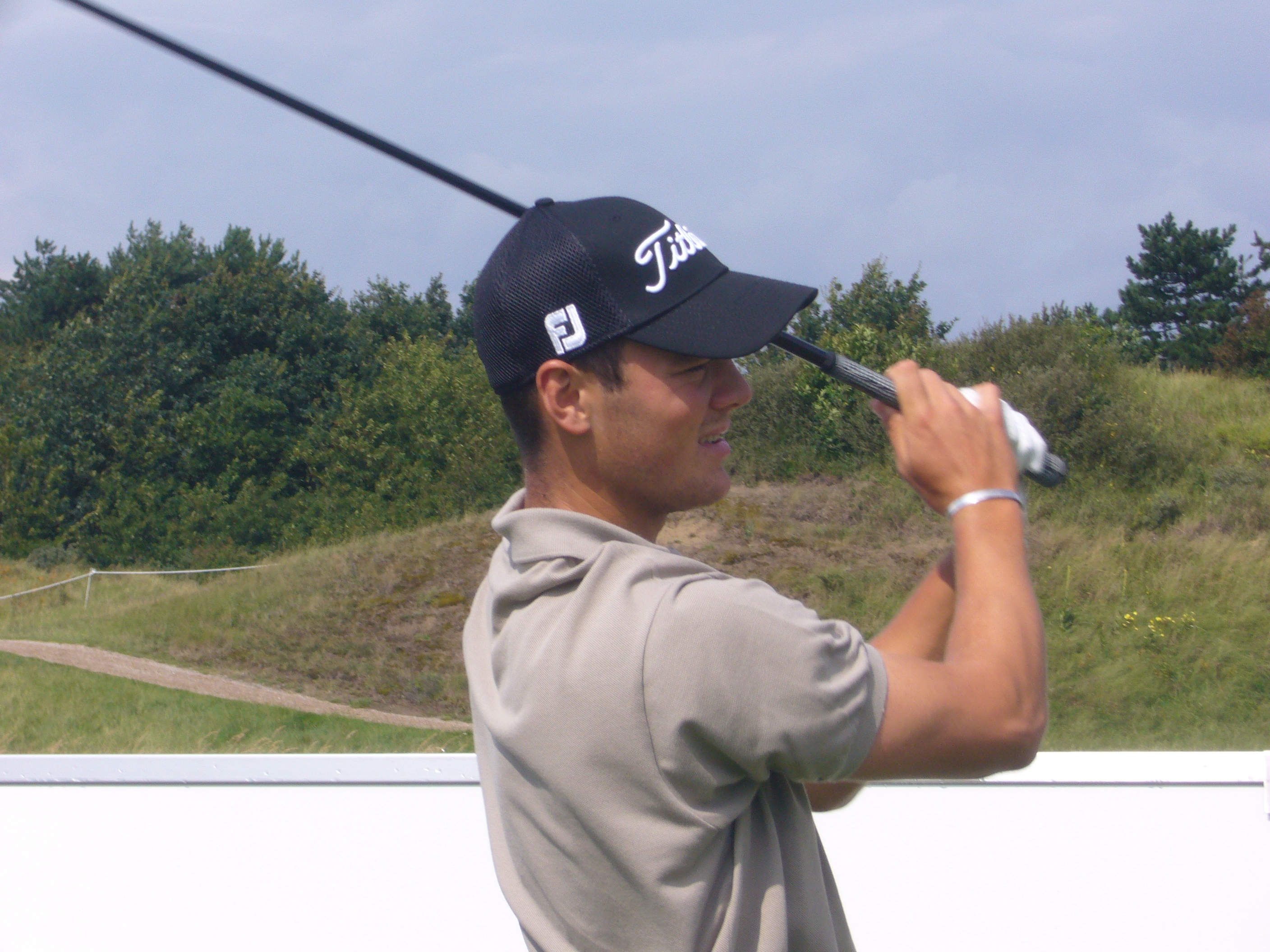
Kaymer at the KLM Open in 2008

Kaymer started 2008 by winning his maiden European Tour event with a wire-to-wire victory at the Abu Dhabi Golf Championship. This achievement lifted him to 34th in the world rankings, making him the only player in the top 50 under the age of 25. It also secured his entry into the WGC-Accenture Match Play Championship and the Masters. Two weeks after winning the Abu Dhabi Golf Championship, he finished second in the Dubai Desert Classic. He finished the tournament with birdie-birdie-eagle but world number one Tiger Woods topped him by one stroke. Kaymer moved up to a high of 21st in the world rankings due to his runner-up finish.

Kaymer picked up his second victory of the year at the BMW International Open, becoming the first German to win the event in its 20-year history. He held a six stroke lead going into the final round but then shot a 75 (+3) which resulted in Kaymer going to a playoff with Anders Hansen. Kaymer birdied the first playoff hole to win the tournament.

Kaymer came close to picking up his third win of the year at the Alfred Dunhill Links Championship, but he fell to Robert Karlsson in a three-man playoff that also included Ross Fisher. Kaymer recorded another runner-up finish at the Volvo Masters, finishing two strokes behind winner Søren Kjeldsen. Kaymer earned €1,794,500 in 2008 and finished 8th on the Order of Merit. Kaymer narrowly missed selection for the 2008 Ryder Cup, but European captain Nick Faldo invited Kaymer to assist the European side in a non-playing capacity which Kaymer accepted. Kaymer represented his country at the 2008 Omega Mission Hills World Cup with Alex Čejka. The pair finished in fifth.

In 2009, Kaymer almost defended his title at the Abu Dhabi Golf Championship but finished in a tie for second, one stroke behind winner Paul Casey. He continued his success in the Middle East by finishing in a tie for fourth at the Dubai Desert Classic. Kaymer won his third European Tour event in July, the Open de France Alstom. He defeated Lee Westwood on the first hole of a playoff when Westwood hit his approach shot into the water. The win moved Kaymer into the top 100 of the European Tour Career Earnings list.

Kaymer also won the following week at the Barclays Scottish Open at Loch Lomond Golf Club near Glasgow, for his fourth career win. He came from a shot behind on the final day with a round of 2-under 69 to win by two strokes. The win elevated him to 11th in the Official World Golf Ranking. The week after that, Kaymer finished T-34 at the Open Championship, which was his best finish in a major to that time. He bettered this when he moved through the final round field to finish in a tie for sixth at the PGA Championship.

Kaymer suffered an injury in a go-kart accident and missed September and October. He returned to the final stages of the Race to Dubai on the European Tour and finished the season ranked third.

In January 2010, Kaymer won the Abu Dhabi Golf Championship by one shot over Ian Poulter. After missing the cut at the Masters, Kaymer finished tied for eighth at the U.S. Open and tied for seventh at The Open Championship, after starting the final round in third place.

On 15 August in Wisconsin, Kaymer won the 2010 PGA Championship at Whistling Straits for his first major title. Finishing regulation play in a two-way tie at 11 under par, he defeated Bubba Watson in a three-hole aggregate playoff.

Kaymer was a member of the winning European Ryder Cup team in 2010. He won both four-balls (partnered with Westwood and Poulter), halved his foursome and lost his singles match. A week later he won the Alfred Dunhill Links Championship at St Andrews with Danny Willett coming in three strokes behind. He was the first player since Tiger Woods in 2006 to win three successive tournaments in a year and the first European to achieve this since Nick Faldo in 1989. The win took him to a career high of third in the Official World Golf Ranking. Kaymer and Graeme McDowell shared the European Tour Golfer of the Year award.

Entering the 2011 season, Kaymer turned down a chance to become a full PGA Tour member; he had gained exempt status with his win in the PGA Championship. He stated he would concentrate on the European Tour for 2011, but would play several U.S. events as well.

In January, Kaymer claimed his third Abu Dhabi HSBC Golf Championship title in four years and displaced Tiger Woods as number two in the world rankings.

After his runner-up finish at the 2011 WGC-Accenture Match Play Championship, Kaymer overtook Lee Westwood as the number one golfer in the world, making him only the second German (after Bernhard Langer) to be the top-ranked golfer in the world. At the time he was the second youngest to reach world number one behind Tiger Woods, soon surpassed by Rory McIlroy in March 2012, who gained the top ranking at age 22. In April, he relinquished his number one ranking after eight weeks to Westwood, who won the Indonesian Masters.

After reaching the number one ranking, Kaymer decided to undergo a swing change to be able to move the ball both ways. Frustrated with his disappointing results at the Masters, Kaymer looked to better shape a draw, a shot he thought he needed to be able to contend at Augusta. Kaymer missed the cut at the Masters for the fourth time in 2011 and later admitted that changing his swing for Augusta was a "big mistake". The rest of 2011 was relatively inconsistent for Kaymer.

In November 2011, Kaymer won his first WGC title at the WGC-HSBC Champions event in Shanghai, China. He entered the final round trailing Freddie Jacobson by five strokes, then shot a final round 9-under 63 to take the title by three strokes from Jacobson. After parring his opening six holes, Kaymer birdied nine of the remaining twelve, with four straight birdies at the start of the back nine. This was the biggest comeback win ever in the history of the WGC events, and the lowest final round by a WGC winner, topping a 64 set by Hunter Mahan in 2010. Kaymer became the tenth player to have won both a major and a WGC event, and the win took him back to world number four.

Kaymer struggled for most of the 2012 season dropping to 32nd in the world golf rankings. Kaymer had only 6 top tens with no worldwide victories. During the 2012 Ryder Cup, European Captain José María Olazábal played the struggling Kaymer in only one team match before the Sunday singles matches. The European team completed a historic comeback from 10–6 down at the start of the final day. Kaymer won his singles match of the Ryder Cup against Steve Stricker by one hole. His putt on the 18th at that point assured that Europe would at least retain the cup. Shortly afterwards Italy's Francesco Molinari halved the final match clinching the win for Europe and thus completed the historic comeback. After the clinching putt, Kaymer said that Langer's miss at Kiawah in 1991 slipped through his mind.

=== PGA Tour ===
2013 was another inconsistent year for Kaymer with no worldwide victories. Kaymer decided to join the PGA Tour for the 2013 season.

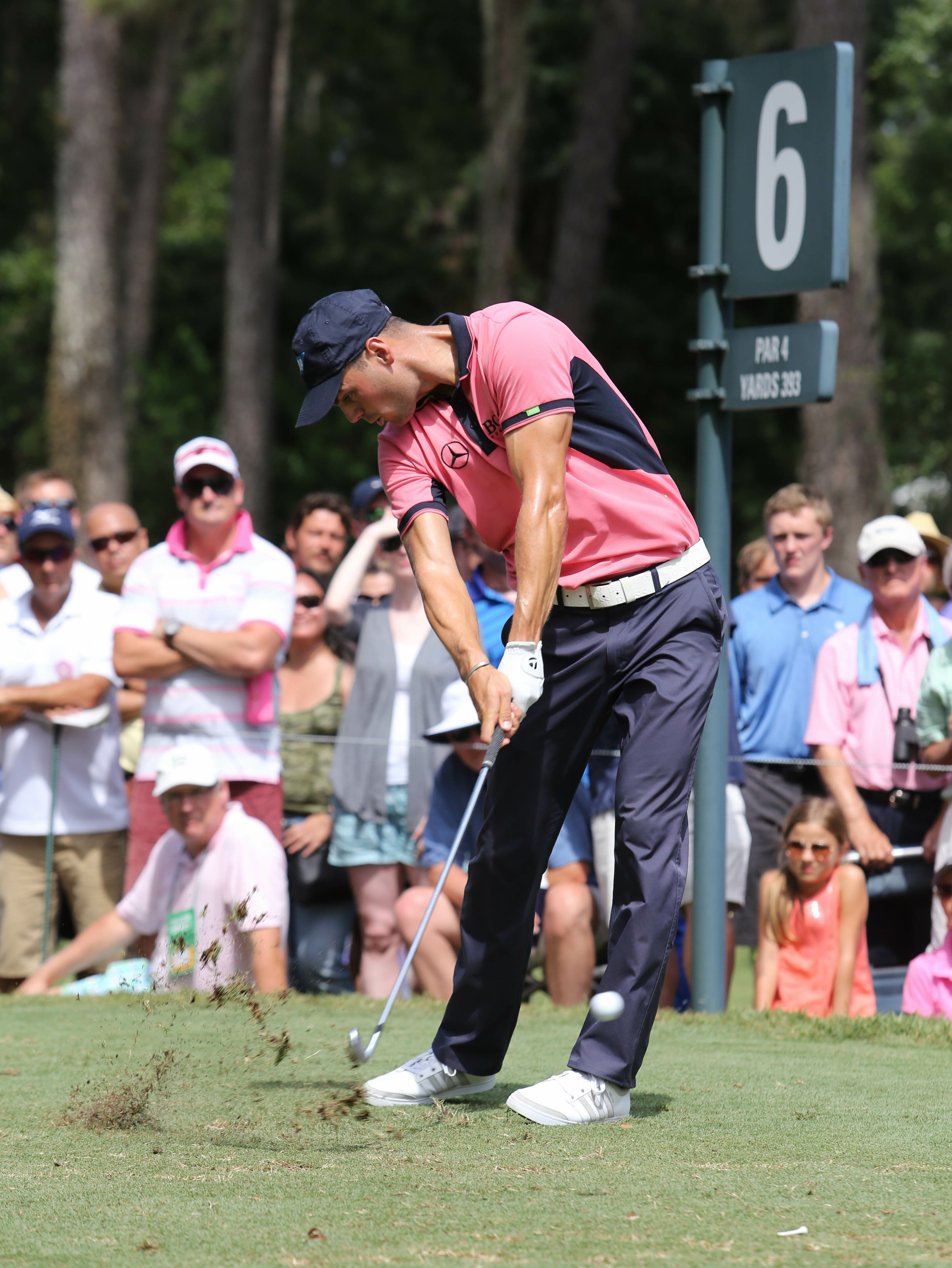
Kaymer at the 2014 Players Championship

In May 2014, Kaymer earned a wire-to-wire win at The Players Championship in Ponte Vedra Beach, Florida, with 275 (−13) for a one-shot victory over runner-up Jim Furyk. He started the week with a course record-tying 63 in the first round at the Stadium Course of TPC at Sawgrass, joining Fred Couples (1992), Greg Norman (1994), and Roberto Castro (2013). He played the front nine (his second nine) in 29 (−7). This was the first time ever, back or front nine, that a player shot below 30 through nine holes at The Players. The final round was delayed due to bad weather while Kaymer was playing the 14th hole. He holed a difficult 28-foot (8.5 m) par putt (with a huge downhill left-to-right-break) on the 17th green to retain his one-stroke lead. His approach shot on 18 was short of the green but he holed the winning putt for par in near darkness and avoided a three-hole playoff. He became the fourth European to win this event (Sandy Lyle in 1987, Sergio García in 2008, and Henrik Stenson in 2009), and is the fourth to win a major, a World Golf Championship, and The Players, joining Tiger Woods, Adam Scott, and Phil Mickelson. Kaymer earned a winner's share of $1.8 million, the largest of his career, and re-entered the top-50 in the Official World Golf Ranking, rising 33 places from 61st to 28th.

In June, Kaymer started the U.S. Open at Pinehurst with consecutive rounds of 65 (−5) to set a U.S. Open record for 36 holes (130). He finished at 271 (−9), eight strokes ahead of runners-up Rickie Fowler and Erik Compton, and became the first player in history to win those two championships back to back. (Woods also held both titles concurrently, winning the U.S. Open in 2000 and The Players in March 2001; it moved to May in 2007.) With the win, Kaymer gained exempt status on the PGA Tour through 2019 and rose to eleventh in the world rankings; he became the second non-British European, after Graeme McDowell, to win the U.S. Open, and one of few to win two majors prior to age thirty. Kaymer was the fourth to win The Players and a major in the same calendar year, joining Jack Nicklaus (1978, Open), Hal Sutton (1983, PGA), and Woods (2001, Masters).

In October, Kaymer won the PGA Grand Slam of Golf, the annual 36-hole event featuring the year's four major champions.

The season began with Kaymer's appearance at the Abu Dhabi HSBC Golf Championship. With scores of 64, 67, and 65, he held to a six-shot lead after three rounds. This extended to a ten-shot lead after five holes in the final round. Kaymer found trouble in the bunkers, resulting in a round of 75 and a fall to third place behind Frenchman Gary Stal, who secured his first European Tour victory, and world number one Rory McIlroy. Speaking after the round, Kaymer told the media that he was "in shock" at the result: "I'm surprised and shocked," the German said. "I don't really know how to put it into words. It was very, very surprising today. It will take me a few days to reflect on this. I don't think I played that badly. I started well and just hit two drives which led to two bad holes."

In August, after failing to qualify for the FedEx Cup Playoffs, Kaymer lost his PGA Tour status for the 2015–16 season. He only played in 13 events, two less than the minimum for PGA Tour membership.

In September, Kaymer held a three-shot lead at the Open d'Italia with nine holes to play. But a poor back nine saw him fall into a playoff with Rikard Karlberg. He was defeated with a birdie on the second extra playoff hole.

Looking to end a five-year winless drought, Kaymer took charge of the Memorial Tournament in June 2019, after three rounds of 67-68-66, building a two stroke advantage after 54 holes. He soon doubled that during the early part of the final round, but faltered on the back nine, including finding the water on the 15th at Muirfield Village. Kaymer had to settle for a third-place finish, as Patrick Cantlay stormed through to take the title.

=== Return to European Tour ===
Kaymer regained form in the European Tour 2020 season. He held a one shot lead with two holes to play at the ISPS Handa UK Championship, but a bogey on the par-5 17th at The Belfry, cost him a place in a playoff and seen him finish in a tie for third-place.

One week later, Kaymer was in contention again to claim his first victory in over 6 years when he came up short to John Catlin at the Estrella Damm N.A. Andalucía Masters. He finished solo second.

In October, he finished in a tie for fifth place at the Italian Open.

In April, Kaymer was tied for the lead after 54 holes at the Austrian Golf Open. A final round 70 saw him finish in solo third place; three shots short of the playoff between John Catlin and Maximilian Kieffer.

In June, Kaymer shot a final round 64 to finish second at the BMW International Open, two shots behind Viktor Hovland.

In September, Kaymer served as a non-playing vice-captain for Team Europe at the 2021 Ryder Cup.

=== LIV Golf League ===
In 2022, Kaymer joined the inaugural LIV Golf Invitational Series, signing as a team captain for Cleeks GC.

He guided his all-European team, featuring Richard Bland, Kalle Samooja and Adrian Meronk, to their first victory at the Golf Club of Houston tournament on the 2024 LIV Golf League.

At the 2026 PGA Championship, Kaymer shot a 3-under 67 at Aronimink Golf Club to share the first-round lead with Scottie Scheffler and five other golfers.

== Amateur wins ==
- 2003 Austrian Amateur Open Championship
- 2004 German Amateur Closed Championship

== Professional wins (23) ==
=== PGA Tour wins (3) ===
Legend
Major championships (2)
Players Championships (1)
Other PGA Tour (0)

No.	Date	Tournament	Winning score	To par	Margin of victory	Runner(s)-up
1	15 Aug 2010	PGA Championship	72-68-67-70=277	−11	Playoff	(United States) Bubba Watson
2	11 May 2014	The Players Championship	63-69-72-71=275	−13	1 stroke	(United States) Jim Furyk
3	15 Jun 2014	U.S. Open	65-65-72-69=271	−9	8 strokes	(United States) Erik Compton, (United States) Rickie Fowler

PGA Tour playoff record (1–0)

No.	Year	Tournament	Opponent	Result
1	2010	PGA Championship	(United States) Bubba Watson	Won three-hole aggregate playoff; Kaymer: E (4-2-5=11), Watson: +1 (3-3-6=12)

=== European Tour wins (11) ===
Legend
Major championships (2)
World Golf Championships (1)
Other European Tour (8)

No.	Date	Tournament	Winning score	To par	Margin of victory	Runner(s)-up
1	20 Jan 2008	Abu Dhabi Golf Championship	66-65-68-74=273	−15	4 strokes	(Sweden) Henrik Stenson, (England) Lee Westwood
2	22 Jun 2008	BMW International Open	68-63-67-75=273	−15	Playoff	(Denmark) Anders Hansen
3	5 Jul 2009	Open de France Alstom	62-72-69-68=271	−13	Playoff	(England) Lee Westwood
4	12 Jul 2009	Barclays Scottish Open	69-65-66-69=269	−15	2 strokes	(Spain) Gonzalo Fernández-Castaño, (France) Raphaël Jacquelin
5	24 Jan 2010	Abu Dhabi Golf Championship (2)	67-67-67-66=267	−21	1 stroke	(England) Ian Poulter
6	15 Aug 2010	PGA Championship	72-68-67-70=277	−11	Playoff	(United States) Bubba Watson
7	12 Sep 2010	KLM Open	67-67-66-66=266	−14	4 strokes	(Sweden) Christian Nilsson, (Paraguay) Fabrizio Zanotti
8	10 Oct 2010	Alfred Dunhill Links Championship	68-69-68-66=271	−17	3 strokes	(England) Danny Willett
9	23 Jan 2011	Abu Dhabi HSBC Golf Championship (3)	67-65-66-66=264	−24	8 strokes	(Northern Ireland) Rory McIlroy
10	6 Nov 2011	WGC-HSBC Champions (Note: The 2011 WGC-HSBC Champions is not counted as a PGA Tour win because Kaymer was not a PGA Tour member at the time.)	69-68-68-63=268	−20	3 strokes	(Sweden) Freddie Jacobson
11	15 Jun 2014	U.S. Open	65-65-72-69=271	−9	8 strokes	(United States) Erik Compton, (United States) Rickie Fowler

European Tour playoff record (3–2)

No.	Year	Tournament	Opponent(s)	Result
1	2008	BMW International Open	(Denmark) Anders Hansen	Won with birdie on first extra hole
2	2008	Alfred Dunhill Links Championship	(England) Ross Fisher, (Sweden) Robert Karlsson	Karlsson won with birdie on first extra hole
3	2009	Open de France Alstom	(England) Lee Westwood	Won with par on first extra hole
4	2010	PGA Championship	(United States) Bubba Watson	Won three-hole aggregate playoff; Kaymer: E (4-2-5=11), Watson: +1 (3-3-6=12)
5	2015	Open d'Italia	(Sweden) Rikard Karlberg	Lost to birdie on second extra hole

=== Sunshine Tour wins (1) ===
No.	Date	Tournament	Winning score	To par	Margin of victory	Runner-up
1	2 Dec 2012	Nedbank Golf Challenge	72-69-70-69=280	−8	2 strokes	(South Africa) Charl Schwartzel

=== Challenge Tour wins (2) ===
No.	Date	Tournament	Winning score	To par	Margin of victory	Runner(s)-up
1	13 Aug 2006	Vodafone Challenge	70-67-63-70=270	−18	2 strokes	(England) Matthew King, (Spain) Álvaro Quirós
2	17 Sep 2006	Open des Volcans – Challenge de France	67-64-69-71=271	−13	6 strokes	(France) Mike Lorenzo-Vera

=== EPD Tour wins (6) ===
No.	Date	Tournament	Winning score	To par	Margin of victory	Runner-up
1	14 Jun 2005	Central German Classic (as an amateur)	67-64-66=197	−19	5 strokes	(Germany) Wolfgang Huget
2	1 Jun 2006	Friedberg Classic	70-64-69=203	−13	7 strokes	(Denmark) Mark Schytter
3	22 Jun 2006	Habsburg Classic	68-59-62=189	−27	10 strokes	(Netherlands) Rick Huiskamp
4	4 Jul 2006	Coburg Brose Open	68-68-68=204	−12	4 strokes	(Denmark) Lasse Jensen
5	12 Jul 2006	Gut Winterbrock Classic	68-60-71=199	−17	1 stroke	(Germany) Richard Treis
6	17 Aug 2006	Hockenberg Classic	72-64-63=199	−17	7 strokes	(Germany) Christoph Günther

=== Other wins (2) ===
No.	Date	Tournament	Winning score	To par	Margin of victory	Runner-up
1	9 Aug 2007	HDI Gerling German PGA Championship	65-70-65=200	−16	4 strokes	(Germany) Gary Birch Jr.
2	15 Oct 2014	PGA Grand Slam of Golf	65-71=136	−6	Playoff	(United States) Bubba Watson

Other playoff record (1–0)

No.	Year	Tournament	Opponent	Result
1	2014	PGA Grand Slam of Golf	(United States) Bubba Watson	Won with birdie on first extra hole

== Major championships ==
=== Wins (2) ===
Year	Championship	54 holes	Winning score	Margin	Runner(s)-up
2010	PGA Championship	4 shot deficit	−11 (72-68-67-70=277)	Playoff^{1}	(United States) Bubba Watson
2014	U.S. Open	5 shot lead	−9 (65-65-72-69=271)	8 strokes	(United States) Erik Compton, (United States) Rickie Fowler

^{1}Defeated Bubba Watson in a three-hole playoff: Kaymer (4-2-5=11), Watson (3-3-6=12)

=== Results timeline ===
Results not in chronological order in 2020.

Tournament	2008	2009	2010	2011	2012	2013	2014	2015	2016	2017	2018
Masters Tournament	CUT	CUT	CUT	CUT	T44	T35	T31	CUT	T49	T16	48
U.S. Open	T53	CUT	T8	T39	T15	T59	1	CUT	T37	T35	CUT
The Open Championship	80	T34	T7	T12	CUT	T32	70	T12	T36	T37	CUT
PGA Championship	CUT	T6	1	CUT	CUT	T33	CUT	T12	T7		T42

Tournament	2019	2020	2021	2022	2023	2024	2025	2026
Masters Tournament	T51							
PGA Championship	CUT	CUT	CUT	CUT		T73	CUT	T35
U.S. Open	T35	CUT	T26		CUT	T64		
The Open Championship		NT	CUT					

Win
Top 10
Did not play

CUT = missed the half-way cut
"T" = tied
NT = no tournament due to COVID-19 pandemic

=== Summary ===
Tournament	Wins	2nd	3rd	Top-5	Top-10	Top-25	Events	Cuts made
Masters Tournament	0	0	0	0	0	1	12	7
PGA Championship	1	0	0	1	3	4	17	8
U.S. Open	1	0	0	1	2	3	16	11
The Open Championship	0	0	0	0	1	3	12	9
Totals	2	0	0	2	6	11	57	35

- Most consecutive cuts made – 10 (2015 Open – 2018 Masters)
- Longest streak of top-10s – 3 (2010 U.S. Open – 2010 PGA)

== The Players Championship ==
=== Wins (1) ===
Year	Championship	54 holes	Winning score	Margin	Runner-up
2014	The Players Championship	Tied for lead	−13 (63-69-72-71=275)	1 stroke	(United States) Jim Furyk

=== Results timeline ===
Tournament	2009	2010	2011	2012	2013	2014	2015	2016	2017	2018	2019
The Players Championship	T55	T34	T19	T15	T43	1	T56	T39	T69	CUT	71

Win

CUT = missed the halfway cut
"T" indicates a tie for a place.

== World Golf Championships ==
=== Wins (1) ===
Year	Championship	54 holes	Winning score	Margin	Runner-up
2011	WGC-HSBC Champions	5 shot deficit	−20 (69-68-68-63=268)	3 strokes	(Sweden) Freddie Jacobson

=== Results timeline ===
Results not in chronological order before 2015.

Tournament	2008	2009	2010	2011	2012	2013	2014	2015	2016	2017
Championship	T57	T35	T3	T24	T20	T49	T58	T31	T42	T23
Match Play	R64	R32	R32	2	R16	R16	R64	T34	T18	T17
Invitational	T68	T60	T22	T29	T29	T9	T56	T45		
Champions		T6	T30	1	9	T8	T6	T30	T40	

Win
Top 10
Did not play

QF, R16, R32, R64 = Round in which player lost in match play
"T" = tied
Note that the HSBC Champions did not become a WGC event until 2009.

== European Tour professional career summary ==
Year	Starts	Cuts made	Wins	2nd	3rd	Top 10	Top 25	Earnings (€)	Money list rank
2007	29	16	0	1	1	5	2	754,691	41
2008	25	19	2	3	0	8	12	1,794,500	8
2009	20	17	2	2	0	7	12	2,864,342	3
2010	22	18	4	0	1	10	16	4,461,011	1
2011	22	19	2	2	1	8	13	3,489,033	3
2012	24	19	0	0	1	6	13	996,382	30
2013	18	18	0	0	0	7	12	1,042,037	24
2014	18	15	1	0	0	2	5	1,793,339	15
2015	21	19	0	1	1	5	9	1,429,268	22
2016	22	20	0	0	0	8	13	1,622,333	17
2017	21	16	0	0	0	2	8	1,093,826	33
2018	20	11	0	1	0	3	7	751,930	54
2019	17	13	0	0	0	3	9	626,744	68
Career*	281	231	11	10	5	49	132	22,763,392	12

* As of the 2019 season

== Team appearances ==
Amateur

- European Boys' Team Championship (representing Germany): 2001, 2002
- European Amateur Team Championship (representing Germany): 2003, 2005
- European Youths' Team Championship (representing Germany): 2004
- Eisenhower Trophy (representing Germany): 2004
- St Andrews Trophy (representing the Continent of Europe): 2004

Professional

- World Cup (representing Germany): 2007, 2008, 2009, 2011, 2018
- Ryder Cup (representing Europe): 2010 (winners), 2012 (winners), 2014 (winners), 2016

Ryder Cup points record
2010	2012	2014	2016	Total
2.5	1	2	1	6.5

== See also ==
- 2006 Challenge Tour graduates
- List of golfers with most European Tour wins
- List of men's major championships winning golfers
- Lowest rounds of golf
