= Scottish Open (golf) =

Golf tournament

Coordinates: 56.052°N 2.812°W

Genesis Scottish Open

Tournament information
- Location: North Berwick, Scotland
- Established: 1972
- Course: Renaissance Club
- Par: 70
- Length: 7,237 yards (6,618 m)
- Tours: European Tour; PGA Tour
- Format: Stroke play
- Prize fund: US$9,000,000
- Month played: July

Tournament record score
- Aggregate: 260 Brandon Stone (2018)
- To par: −22 Benjamin Hébert (2019) −22 Bernd Wiesberger (2019)

Current champion
- (South Korea) Tom Kim

Location map
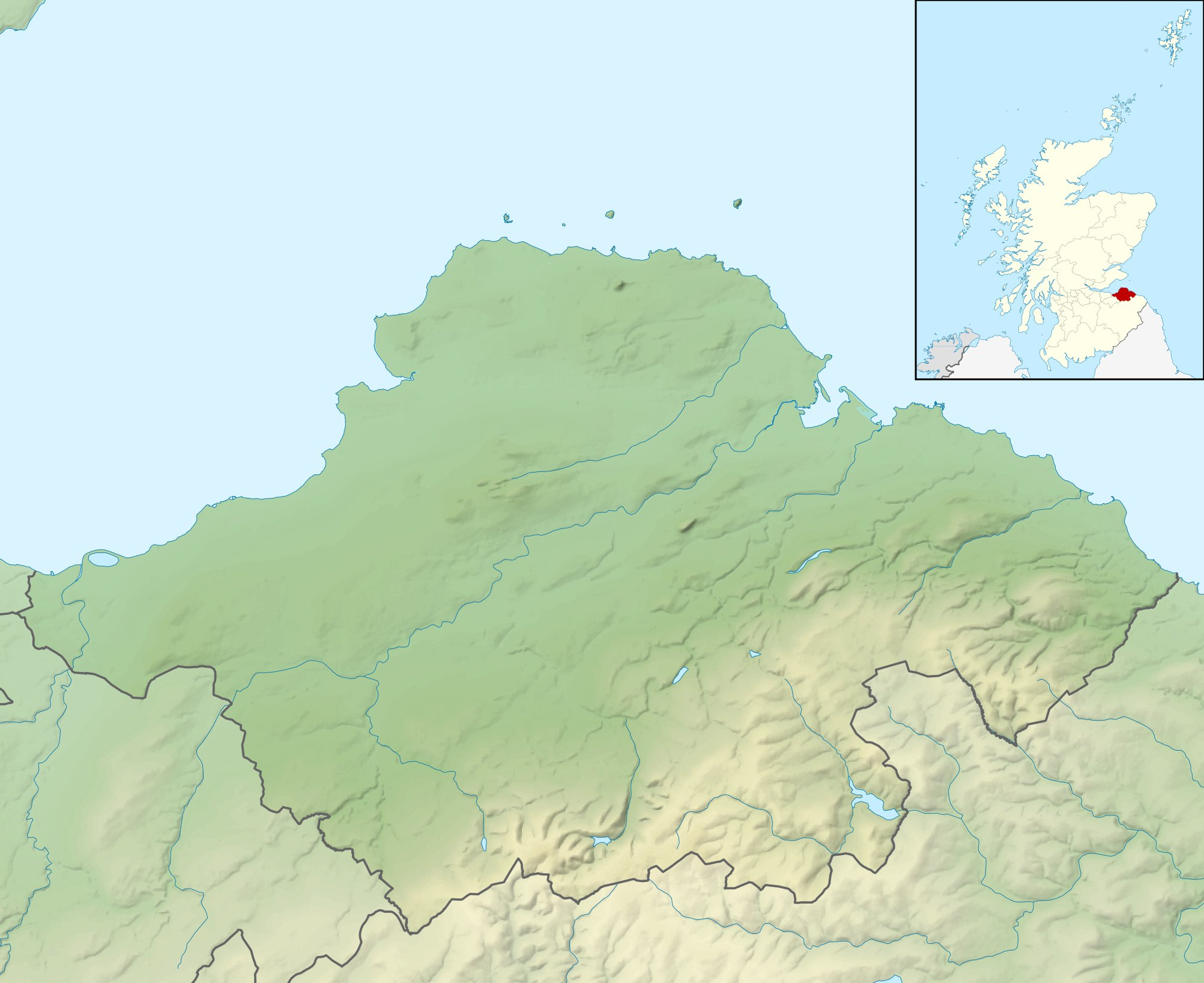
- Location in Scotland Location in East Lothian

Scottish Open venues ( Current venue)
- Do=Downfield (x1)
- Gl=Gleneagles (x8)
- SA=St Andrews (x1)
- HC=Haggs Castle (x1)
- Ca=Carnoustie (x2)
- LL=Loch Lomond (x15)
- CS=Castle Stuart (x4)
- RA=Royal Aberdeen (x1)
- Gu=Gullane (x2)
- Du=Dundonald (x1)
- Re=Renaissance Club (x8)

The Genesis Scottish Open is a professional golf tournament in Scotland, and is one of five tournaments that are part of the Rolex Series, which identifies it as one of the European Tour's premier events. It has been played on various courses, but in recent years it has been played on a links course, appealing to players who wish to gain experience before The Open, which takes place in the following week.

Since 1987 it has, together with John Deere Classic, been the last chance to qualify for The Open. It has been part of the Open Qualifying Series since that series started in 2014. The leading 3 players (4 in 2016) not already qualified, have received an entry to the Open. Before 2014 there was generally an exemption category so that the leading player or players, not already qualified, could play in the Open.

The Scottish Open became a Rolex Series event in 2017 (when the series was inaugurated), which meant the prize fund was increased to $7 million. Beginning in 2022, the tournament was co-sanctioned by the PGA Tour and title sponsored by Genesis.

== History ==
=== 1972 and 1973 ===
The first Sunbeam Electric Scottish Open was part of the 1972 European Tour and was held at Downfield Golf Club in Dundee. Neil Coles beat Brian Huggett at the second hole of a sudden-death playoff, holing a 12-foot putt. Total prize money was £10,000 with a first prize of £2,000. Sunbeam Electric had sponsored the Sunbeam Electric Tournament in 1971.

In 1973 the event was played on the Old Course at St Andrews. Graham Marsh won by 6 strokes from Peter Oosterhuis. Total prize money was increased to £15,000 with a first prize of £2,500.

Both 1972 and 1973 tournaments were broadcast extensively on ITV. The tournament was cancelled when television coverage could not be arranged in 1974.

=== 1986 revival ===
The event returned to the European Tour calendar in 1986 when, under a new sponsorship deal with Bell's, the Glasgow Open, which had been held at Haggs Castle Golf Club from 1983 to 1985, was rebranded as the Scottish Open. After remaining at Haggs Castle for the first year, the tournament moved to Gleneagles in 1987 and was played the week before the Open Championship. 1987 also saw the BBC broadcast live coverage of the event, and continued to do so until 1993. It remained at Gleneagles until Bell's withdrew their sponsorship in 1994 following the switch of TV coverage from BBC to SKY that year. In 1995 and 1996 it was held, without a sponsor, at Carnoustie.

The 1986 event had prize money of £130,000 with a first prize of £21,660. This rose to £200,000 with a first prize of £33,330 for the 1987 event at Gleneagles. This had risen to £600,000 and a first prize of £100,000 for the 1992 tournament. Despite the loss of Bell's sponsorship the prize money increased to £650,000 in 1995 but, with the event losing money, this was reduced to £480,000 in 1996.

=== Loch Lomond ===
From 1997 the Scottish Open's pre-Open place on the European Tour schedule was taken by the Loch Lomond World Invitational, which had been first held at Loch Lomond Golf Club in September 1996. The top-60 in the World Rankings were invited but few non-Europeans entered. The event was broadcast by the BBC. From 1997 to 2000 the Loch Lomond event was played the week before the Open Championship. These events did not use the Scottish Open name, the rights to which were owned by ISM. From 2001, it was decided that the Loch Lomond event would be known as the Scottish Open and all prior editions, including the September 1996 event, would be granted Scottish Open status. This resulted in the anomaly of there being two "Scottish Opens" in 1996. The September 1996 event had a first prize of £125,000, rising to £133,330 in 1997 and £183,330 by 2000.

The 2001 Scottish Open was run without a main sponsor but from 2002 it was known as the Barclays Scottish Open, and was played at Loch Lomond until 2010. Some concern was expressed that its parkland course, very different from the links courses on which the Open Championship is played, put European Tour players at a disadvantage compared to their leading rivals from the PGA Tour, who traditionally spent a week practising for the Open on links courses in Ireland.

=== Links courses ===
In 2011 it was held at Castle Stuart Golf Links, near Inverness, due to the financial difficulties being suffered by Loch Lomond. Play was reduced to 54 holes (three rounds) in the tournament due to heavy rain, which caused flooding and landslides. Aberdeen Asset Management took over sponsorship in 2012, but the event remained at Castle Stuart in 2012 and 2013 before moving to Royal Aberdeen Golf Club in 2014. It was played at Gullane Golf Club in 2015 and at Castle Stuart Golf Links in 2016. In 2016, the attendance figures at Castle Stuart were disappointing, with a reduction of more than 20,000 to 41,809 over the four tournament days. In 2017 it was held in Ayrshire, for the first time in its current guise, at Dundonald Links, and was played at Gullane again in 2018. Since 2019 the event has been held at the Renaissance Club and is scheduled to remain there until 2026.. In 2022 Genesis Motors became the event's sponsor..

== Disability event ==
From 2019, a 36-hole EDGA (European Disabled Golf Association) Scottish Open event of ten players takes place on the same course on the Saturday and Sunday morning of the main event.

== Winners ==
European Tour (Rolex Series)	2017–
European Tour (Regular)	1972–1973, 1986–2016

#	Year	Tour(s) (Note: EUR − European Tour; PGAT − PGA Tour.)	Winner	Score	To par	Margin of victory	Runner(s)-up	Purse (Note: Before 2017 the prize fund was always stated and paid in pound sterling (£). Since 2017 the prize fund has been stated and paid in United States dollar (US$).)	Winner's share	Venue
Genesis Scottish Open
44th	2026	EUR, PGAT	(South Korea) Tom Kim	263	−17	2 strokes	(Australia) Min Woo Lee	9,000,000	1,575,000	Renaissance
43rd	2025	EUR, PGAT	(United States) Chris Gotterup	265	−15	2 strokes	(Northern Ireland) Rory McIlroy (England) Marco Penge	9,000,000	1,575,000	Renaissance
42nd	2024	EUR, PGAT	(Scotland) Robert MacIntyre	262	−18	1 stroke	(Australia) Adam Scott	9,000,000	1,575,000	Renaissance
41st	2023	EUR, PGAT	(Northern Ireland) Rory McIlroy	265	−15	1 stroke	(Scotland) Robert MacIntyre	9,000,000	1,575,000	Renaissance
40th	2022	EUR, PGAT	(United States) Xander Schauffele	273	−7	1 stroke	(United States) Kurt Kitayama	8,000,000	1,440,000	Renaissance
Abrdn Scottish Open
39th	2021	EUR	(Australia) Min Woo Lee	266	−18	Playoff	(Belgium) Thomas Detry (England) Matt Fitzpatrick	8,000,000	1,333,330	Renaissance
Aberdeen Standard Investments Scottish Open
38th	2020	EUR	(England) Aaron Rai	273	−11	Playoff	(England) Tommy Fleetwood	7,000,000	1,166,669	Renaissance
37th	2019	EUR	(Austria) Bernd Wiesberger	262	−22	Playoff	(France) Benjamin Hébert	7,000,000	1,166,669	Renaissance
36th	2018	EUR	(South Africa) Brandon Stone	260	−20	4 strokes	(England) Eddie Pepperell	7,000,000	1,166,669	Gullane
Aberdeen Asset Management Scottish Open
35th	2017	EUR	(Spain) Rafa Cabrera-Bello	275	−13	Playoff	(England) Callum Shinkwin	7,000,000	1,166,669	Dundonald
34th	2016	EUR	(Sweden) Alex Norén	274	−14	1 stroke	(England) Tyrrell Hatton	3,250,000	541,668	Castle Stuart
33rd	2015	EUR	(United States) Rickie Fowler	268	−12	1 stroke	(France) Raphaël Jacquelin (United States) Matt Kuchar	3,250,000	541,668	Gullane
32nd	2014	EUR	(England) Justin Rose	268	−16	2 strokes	(Sweden) Kristoffer Broberg	3,000,000	500,000	Royal Aberdeen
31st	2013	EUR	(United States) Phil Mickelson	271	−17	Playoff	(South Africa) Branden Grace	3,000,000	500,000	Castle Stuart
30th	2012	EUR	(India) Jeev Milkha Singh	271	−17	Playoff	(Italy) Francesco Molinari	2,500,000	416,668	Castle Stuart
Barclays Scottish Open
29th	2011	EUR	(England) Luke Donald	197 (Note: Shortened to 54 holes due to rain.)	−19	4 strokes	(Sweden) Fredrik Andersson Hed	3,000,000	500,000	Castle Stuart
28th	2010	EUR	(Italy) Edoardo Molinari	272	−12	3 strokes	(Northern Ireland) Darren Clarke	3,000,000	500,000	Loch Lomond
27th	2009	EUR	(Germany) Martin Kaymer	269	−15	2 strokes	(Spain) Gonzalo Fernández-Castaño (France) Raphaël Jacquelin	3,000,000	500,000	Loch Lomond
26th	2008	EUR	(Northern Ireland) Graeme McDowell	271	−13	2 strokes	(South Africa) James Kingston	3,000,000	500,000	Loch Lomond
25th	2007	EUR	(France) Grégory Havret	272	−14	Playoff	(United States) Phil Mickelson	3,000,000	500,000	Loch Lomond
24th	2006	EUR	(Sweden) Johan Edfors	271	−13	2 strokes	(England) Luke Donald (Argentina) Andrés Romero (South Africa) Charl Schwartzel	2,400,000	400,000	Loch Lomond
23rd	2005	EUR	(South Africa) Tim Clark	265	−19	2 strokes	(Northern Ireland) Darren Clarke (Netherlands) Maarten Lafeber	2,400,000	400,000	Loch Lomond
22rd	2004	EUR	(France) Thomas Levet	269	−15	1 stroke	(New Zealand) Michael Campbell	2,200,000	366,660	Loch Lomond
21st	2003	EUR	(South Africa) Ernie Els (2)	267	−17	5 strokes	(Northern Ireland) Darren Clarke (Wales) Phillip Price	2,200,000	366,660	Loch Lomond
20th	2002	EUR	(Argentina) Eduardo Romero	273	−11	Playoff	(Sweden) Freddie Jacobson	2,200,000	366,660	Loch Lomond
Scottish Open
19th	2001	EUR	(South Africa) Retief Goosen	268	−16	3 strokes	(Denmark) Thomas Bjørn	2,200,000	366,660	Loch Lomond
Standard Life Loch Lomond
18th	2000	EUR	(South Africa) Ernie Els	273	−11	1 stroke	(United States) Tom Lehman	1,100,000	183,330	Loch Lomond
17th	1999	EUR	(Scotland) Colin Montgomerie	268	−16	3 strokes	(Spain) Sergio García (Sweden) Michael Jonzon (Sweden) Mats Lanner	1,000,000	166,660	Loch Lomond
16th	1998	EUR	(England) Lee Westwood	276	−8	4 strokes	(Australia) Robert Allenby (Sweden) Dennis Edlund (England) David Howell (Argentina) Eduardo Romero (Wales) Ian Woosnam	850,000	141,660	Loch Lomond
Gulfstream Loch Lomond World Invitational
15th	1997	EUR	(United States) Tom Lehman	265	−19	5 strokes	(South Africa) Ernie Els	800,000	133,330	Loch Lomond
Loch Lomond World Invitational
14th	1996 (Note: Two events were played in 1996 after the Loch Lomond World Invitational became retrospectively recognised as an edition of the Scottish Open.)	EUR	(Denmark) Thomas Bjørn	277	−7	1 stroke	(France) Jean van de Velde	750,000	125,000	Loch Lomond
Scottish Open
13th	1996	EUR	(Wales) Ian Woosnam (3)	289	+1	4 strokes	(Scotland) Andrew Coltart	480,000	80,000	Carnoustie
12th	1995	EUR	(Australia) Wayne Riley	276	−12	2 strokes	(England) Nick Faldo	650,000	108,330	Carnoustie
Bell's Scottish Open
11th	1994	EUR	(England) Carl Mason	265	−15	1 stroke	(England) Peter Mitchell	600,000	100,000	Gleneagles (King's Course)
10th	1993	EUR	(Sweden) Jesper Parnevik	271	−9	5 strokes	(United States) Payne Stewart	600,000	100,000	Gleneagles (King's Course)
9th	1992	EUR	(Australia) Peter O'Malley	262	−18	2 strokes	(Scotland) Colin Montgomerie	600,000	100,000	Gleneagles (King's Course)
8th	1991	EUR	(Australia) Craig Parry	268	−12	1 stroke	(Zimbabwe) Mark McNulty	500,000	83,330	Gleneagles (King's Course)
7th	1990	EUR	(Wales) Ian Woosnam (2)	269	−15	4 strokes	(Zimbabwe) Mark McNulty	400,000	66,660	Gleneagles (King's Course)
6th	1989	EUR	(United States) Michael Allen	272	−8	2 strokes	(Spain) José María Olazábal (Wales) Ian Woosnam	300,000	50,000	Gleneagles (King's Course)
5th	1988	EUR	(England) Barry Lane	271	−13	3 strokes	(Scotland) Sandy Lyle (Spain) José Rivero	250,000	41,660	Gleneagles (King's Course)
4th	1987	EUR	(Wales) Ian Woosnam	264	−20	7 strokes	(Australia) Peter Senior	200,000	33,330	Gleneagles (King's Course)
3rd	1986	EUR	(Northern Ireland) David Feherty	270	−14	Playoff	(Australia) Ian Baker-Finch (Republic of Ireland) Christy O'Connor Jnr	130,000	21,660	Haggs Castle
1974–1985: No tournament
Sunbeam Electric Scottish Open
2nd	1973	EUR	(Australia) Graham Marsh	286	−2	6 strokes	(England) Peter Oosterhuis	15,000	2,500	St Andrews
1st	1972	EUR	(England) Neil Coles	283	−5	Playoff	(Wales) Brian Huggett	10,000	2,000	Downfield

== Previous event of same name ==
Scottish Open
Tournament information
- Location: Scotland
- Established: 1935
- Format: Stroke play
- Final year: 1936

Final champion
- (Scotland) Jimmy Adams

In 1935 Gleneagles hosted a Scottish Open Championship held on the King's course. Total prize money was £750. The R&A objected to the use of the term "Championship" being used for a tournament organised by a private enterprise. Percy Alliss won the tournament by 4 strokes from Jack Busson with an aggregate of 273. The 1936 tournament was sponsored by Penfold and known as the Penfold Scottish Open. Penfold had sponsored tournaments in Wales and England from 1932 to 1934. The tournament was played at Ayr Belleisle Golf Club. Total prize money was again £750. After 72 holes Jimmy Adams and Tom Collinge tied on 287. In the 36-hole playoff, Adams had rounds of 68 and 69 and won by 11 strokes. It was intended to hold the 1937 Penfold Scottish Open in the Carnoustie area, just before the 1937 Open Championship which was to be played there. The R&A objected to the arrangement and the event was cancelled. Penfold resumed their golf sponsorship with the Penfold Professional Golf League in 1938.

#	Year	Winner	Score	Margin of victory	Runner-up	Venue
Penfold Scottish Open
2nd	1936	(Scotland) Jimmy Adams	287	Playoff	(England) Tom Collinge	Belleisle
Scottish Open Championship
1st	1935	(England) Percy Alliss	273	4 strokes	(England) Jack Busson	Gleneagles (King's)

== See also ==
- Open golf tournament
- Ladies Scottish Open
