= Renaissance Club =

Golf club in North Berwick, Scotland

- Location in the United Kingdom Location in Scotland
- 56.0514°N 02.8092°W

Club information
- Location: North Berwick, Scotland
- Established: 2008
- Tournaments: Scottish Open (2019–present); Ladies Scottish Open (2019, 2020); Scottish Senior Open (2017)
- Website: trcaa.com
- Designed by: Tom Doak

The Renaissance Club is a golf club in Scotland, four miles (10 km) west of North Berwick, twenty miles (30 km) east of Edinburgh. It hosted the 2017 Scottish Senior Open,the Scottish Open from 2019 to 2026, and the Ladies Scottish Open in 2019 and 2020.

== Scorecard ==
Hole		1	2	3	4	5	6	7	8	9	Out	10	11	12	13	14	15	16	17	18	In	Total
Par		4	4	5	4	4	3	5	4	3	36	4	3	4	5	4	3	5	3	4	35	71
Yards
Yards	Blue	488	490	601	425	335	148	593	514	202	3,796	417	163	484	541	448	214	551	204	485	3,507	7,303
Yards	White	431	443	561	394	325	137	555	471	188	3,505	380	156	438	503	418	190	502	193	461	3,241	6,746
Yards	Yellow	393	410	511	349	323	125	464	406	180	3,161	370	134	392	470	394	160	465	167	397	2,949	6,110
Yards	Red	377	363	459	307	287	95	399	378	136	2,801	268	120	367	442	353	136	428	125	335	2,574	5,375

== Scottish Opens ==
Scorecard :

Tournament	year	Hole	1	2	3	4	5	6	7	8	9	Out	10	11	12	13	14	15	16	17	18	In	Total
Scottish Open	2019	Par	5	4	3	4	3	4	5	4	3	35	4	4	5	4	4	3	5	3	4	36	71
Scottish Open	2019	Yards	594	475	204	418	161	444	543	448	218	3,505	433	444	600	422	338	147	561	203	483	3,631	7,136
Ladies Scottish Open	2019	Par	5	4	3	4	3	4	5	4	3	35	4	4	5	4	4	3	5	3	4	36	71
Ladies Scottish Open	2019	Yards	553	377	183	364	137	398	505	419	161	3,097	385	411	512	384	328	139	505	167	385	3,216	6,313
Ladies Scottish Open	2020	Par	4	4	5	4	4	3	5	4	3	36	5	4	3	4	3	4	5	3	4	35	71
Ladies Scottish Open	2020	Yards	397	411	512	384	338	139	505	419	191	3,296	553	420	183	383	137	398	505	167	385	3,131	6,427
Scottish Senior Open	2017	Par	4	4	5	4	4	3	5	4	3	36	4	3	4	5	4	3	5	3	4	35	71
Scottish Senior Open	2017	Yards	433	444	600	384	338	147	553	475	205	3,579	418	161	444	544	419	218	505	203	459	3,371	6,950

In the Scottish Open in 2019, hole 7―15 were used in front nine holes, and hole 1―6, 16―18 were used in back nine holes. In the Ladies Scottish Open, in 2019, hole 7―15 were used in front nine holes, and holes 1―6, 16―18 were used in back nine holes, while in 2020, holes 1―6, 16, 14, 15 were used in front nine holes, and hole 7―13, 17, 18 were used on the back nine.
