= Dumbarnie Links =

Golf course in Fife, Scotland

Coordinates: 56°12′45″N 2°53′07″W

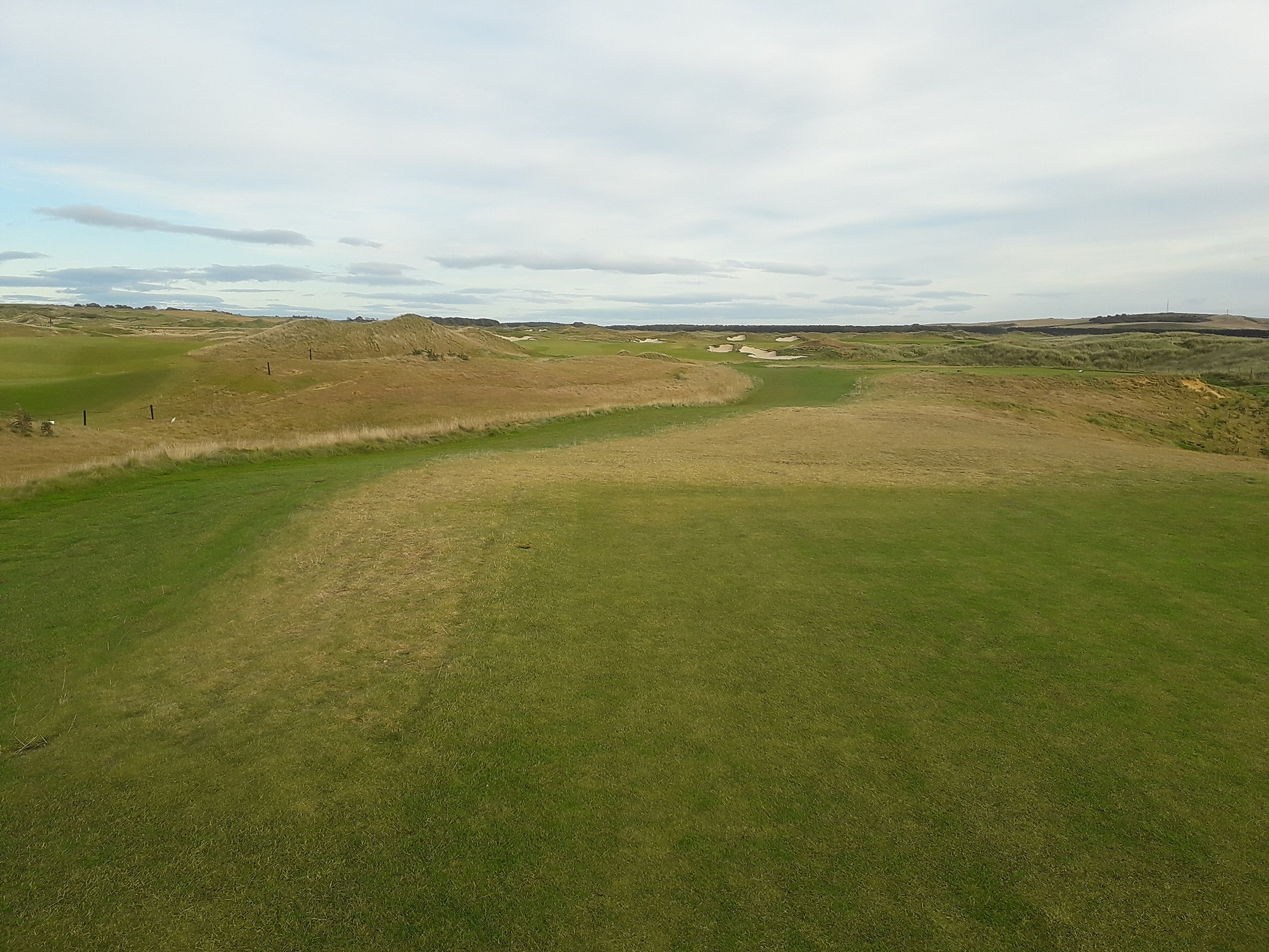
- 10th fairway, pictured 2020
- Interactive map of Dumbarnie Links

Club information
- Established: 2020
- Type: Public
- Owner: Anthony Lindsay, 30th Earl of Crawford
- Tota holes: 18
- Website: https://www.dumbarnielinks.com

Dumbarnie Links is a golf course in Fife, Scotland. It is found 12 miles south of St Andrews where it was built on the Balcarres Estate.

Fife Council gave approval for the creation of the £11 million public course on 165-hectares of agricultural land in 2018. The course was designed by Clive Clark and opened in 2020. In 2021, the course hosted the Women's Scottish Open.

In 2025, the tenth hole was redesigned in response to player feedback. That year, the course received several awards, including "Top Emerging Golf Course" in the United Kingdom.
