= 2011 WGC-HSBC Champions =

Coordinates: 31.110105°N 121.216407°E

Tournament information
- Dates: 3–6 November 2011
- Location: Shanghai, China
- Course: Sheshan Golf Club
- Tour(s): Asian Tour; European Tour; PGA Tour (unofficial)

Statistics
- Par: 72
- Length: 7,266 yards (6,644 m)
- Field: 78 players
- Cut: None
- Prize fund: $7,000,000
- Winner's share: $1,200,000

Champion
- (Germany) Martin Kaymer
- 268 (−20)

The 2011 WGC-HSBC Champions was a golf tournament played from 3–6 November 2011 at the Sheshan Golf Club in Shanghai, China. It was the third WGC-HSBC Champions tournament, and the fourth of four World Golf Championships events held in 2011. Former PGA Champion Martin Kaymer surged through the final day field to claim his first WGC win.

Kaymer's 268 (−20) winning total was the lowest since the tournament became a World Golf Championship, and matched the lowest in the history of the HSBC Champions, set by David Howell in 2005, before WGC status was awarded.

== Field ==
The following is a list of players who have qualified for the 2011 WGC-HSBC Champions. Players who have qualified from multiple categories are listed in the first category in which they are eligible. The numbers of other qualifying categories are in parentheses next to the player's name.

1. Winners of the four major championships and The Players Championship

Keegan Bradley (3,13), K. J. Choi (12), Darren Clarke (13), Rory McIlroy (12), Charl Schwartzel (8,12)

2. Winners of the previous four World Golf Championships

Francesco Molinari (13), Adam Scott (10,12), Nick Watney (3,12)

- Qualified but did not play: Luke Donald (5,12,13)

3. Winners of the top 23 rated PGA Tour events (35 events met rating)

Aaron Baddeley (13), Jonathan Byrd (13), Harrison Frazar, Lucas Glover, Bill Haas (12), Freddie Jacobson (13), D. A. Points, Justin Rose (12), Rory Sabbatini, David Toms (12), Mark Wilson (13)

- Qualified but did not play: Dustin Johnson (12), Martin Laird (13), Phil Mickelson (12), Sean O'Hair, Webb Simpson (12,13), Brandt Snedeker (13), Steve Stricker (12,13), Bubba Watson (12,13), Gary Woodland (13)

4. Top 5 available players from the FedEx Cup points list

Hunter Mahan (12), Geoff Ogilvy (9,13), Chez Reavie, John Senden, Bo Van Pelt

- Qualified but did not play: Jason Day (12), Charles Howell III, Matt Kuchar (12)

5. Winners of the top 23 rated European Tour events (26 events met rating)

Thomas Aiken (8), Thomas Bjørn (13), Paul Casey (12), Nicolas Colsaerts, Simon Dyson (13), Michael Hoey, Robert Karlsson (12), Martin Kaymer (12), Pablo Larrazábal, Paul Lawrie, Tom Lewis, Alex Norén, Álvaro Quirós (13), Robert Rock, Lee Slattery

- Qualified but did not play: Sergio García (13), Thomas Levet

6. Top 5 available players from the Race to Dubai

Anders Hansen (13), Peter Hanson (13), Miguel Ángel Jiménez (13), Ian Poulter (10,12), Lee Westwood (8,10,12)

7. Five players - winners of the top Japan Golf Tour events, remainder from Order of Merit (23 events met rating)

Hiroyuki Fujita, Yuta Ikeda (13), Hwang Jung-gon, Michio Matsumura, Tetsuji Hiratsuka

8. Five players - winners of the top Sunshine Tour events, remainder from Order of Merit (4 events met rating)

Ernie Els (13), Keith Horne (OoM), Jbe' Kruger (OoM), Pablo Martín, Louis Oosthuizen (OoM)

9. Five players - winners of the top PGA Tour of Australasia events, remainder from Order of Merit (3 events met rating)

Stuart Appleby, Adam Bland (OoM), Bobby Gates (OoM), Jim Herman (OoM), Alistair Presnell (OoM)

- Qualified but did not play: Peter Senior

10. Nine players - winners of the top Asian Tour events, remainder from Order of Merit (5 events met rating)

Kiradech Aphibarnrat (OoM), Chan Yih-shin (OoM), Chinnarat Phadungsil (OoM), Shiv Chawrasia, David Gleeson (OoM), Matteo Manassero (13), Siddikur Rahman (OoM), Jeev Milkha Singh (OoM), Thongchai Jaidee (OoM)

11. Four players from China

Liang Wenchong, Wu Ashun, Yuan Hao, Zhang Xinjun

12. Any players, not included in above categories, in the top 25 of the OWGR on October 17, 2011

Kim Kyung-tae, Graeme McDowell

- Qualified but did not play: Rickie Fowler

13. If needed to fill the field of 78 players, winners of additional tournaments, ordered by field strength (12 from PGA Tour, 3 from European Tour, 18 from Japan Golf Tour), alternating with those players ranked after the top 25 in OWGR on October 17, 2011

Players in bold were added to the field through this category. Players listed in "()" already qualified in a previous category. Players listed with their ~~name stricken~~ did not play or were not listed as alternates when the field was announced. .

Tournament winners		From OWGR
Tournament	Winner	Ranked player
2011 John Deere Classic	~~(Steve Stricker)~~	(Keegan Bradley)
2011 Greenbrier Classic	**Scott Stallings**	(Thomas Bjørn)
2011 Bob Hope Classic	**Jhonattan Vegas**	~~(Brandt Snedeker)~~
2011 McGladrey Classic	**Ben Crane**	**Jim Furyk**

== Round summaries ==
=== First round ===
Place	Player	Score	To par
1	(United States) Keegan Bradley	65	−7
T2	(Sweden) Freddie Jacobson	67	−5
T2	(Sweden) Alex Norén	67	−5
T2	(United States) Bo Van Pelt	67	−5
T5	(South Korea) K. J. Choi	68	−4
T5	(Thailand) Thongchai Jaidee	68	−4
T5	(England) Justin Rose	68	−4
T5	(United States) David Toms	68	−4
T9	(Australia) Aaron Baddeley	69	−3
T9	(England) Simon Dyson	69	−3
T9	(Sweden) Peter Hanson	69	−3
T9	(Germany) Martin Kaymer	69	−3
T9	(Northern Ireland) Graeme McDowell	69	−3
T9	(South Africa) Rory Sabbatini	69	−3
T9	(Australia) Adam Scott	69	−3
T9	(Venezuela) Jhonattan Vegas	69	−3
T9	(England) Lee Westwood	69	−3

=== Second round ===
Place	Player	Score	To par
1	(Sweden) Freddie Jacobson	67-66=133	−11
T3	(South Africa) Louis Oosthuizen	71-63=134	−10
T3	(Australia) Adam Scott	69-65=134	−10
4	(United States) Keegan Bradley	65-70=135	−9
T5	(England) Paul Casey	70-66=136	−8
T5	(United States) Bo Van Pelt	67-69=136	−8
T7	(Australia) Aaron Baddeley	69-68=137	−7
T7	(Thailand) Thongchai Jaidee	68-69=137	−7
T7	(Germany) Martin Kaymer	69-68=137	−7
T7	(England) Lee Westwood	69-68=137	−7

=== Third round ===
Place	Player	Score	To par
1	(Sweden) Freddie Jacobson	67-66-67=200	−16
2	(South Africa) Louis Oosthuizen	71-63-68=202	−14
3	(Australia) Adam Scott	69-65-69=203	−13
T4	(Northern Ireland) Rory McIlroy	70-69-65=204	−12
T4	(England) Lee Westwood	69-68-67=204	−12
T6	(Germany) Martin Kaymer	69-68-68=205	−11
T6	(Northern Ireland) Graeme McDowell	69-69-67=205	−11
T8	(England) Paul Casey	70-66-70=206	−10
T8	(United States) Bo Van Pelt	67-69-70=206	−10
T8	(China) Zhang Xinjun	74-68-64=206	−10

=== Final round ===
Place	Player	Score	To par	Money ($)
1	(Germany) Martin Kaymer	69-68-68-63=268	−20	1,200,000
2	(Sweden) Freddie Jacobson	67-66-67-71=271	−17	675,000
3	(Northern Ireland) Graeme McDowell	69-69-67-67=272	−16	430,000
T4	(England) Paul Casey	70-66-70-67=273	−15	258,333
T4	(Northern Ireland) Rory McIlroy	70-69-65-69=273	−15	258,333
T4	(South Africa) Charl Schwartzel	70-69-69-65=273	−15	258,333
T7	(United States) Hunter Mahan	71-67-69-67=274	−14	155,000
T7	(South Africa) Louis Oosthuizen	71-63-68-72=274	−14	155,000
T7	(England) Justin Rose	68-70-70-66=274	−14	155,000
10	(Venezuela) Jhonattan Vegas	69-73-65-68=275	−13	125,000

==== Scorecard ====
Birdie	Bogey

Hole	1	2	3	4	5	6	7	8	9	10	11	12	13	14	15	16	17	18
Par	4	5	4	3	4	3	4	5	4	4	4	3	4	5	4	4	3	5
(Germany) Kaymer	−11	−11	−11	−11	−11	−11	−12	−13	−13	−14	−15	−16	−17	−17	−18	−18	−19	−20
(Sweden) Jacobson	−15	−16	−16	−16	−16	−17	−17	−16	−16	−16	−16	−17	−17	−18	−18	−18	−17	−17
(Northern Ireland) McDowell	−11	−12	−12	−12	−12	−13	−13	−13	−13	−13	−13	−13	−14	−14	−15	−16	−16	−16
(England) Casey	−10	−10	−11	−12	−12	−13	−14	−15	−15	−15	−15	−15	−15	−15	−15	−15	−15	−15
(Northern Ireland) McIlroy	−13	−14	−14	−14	−14	−14	−14	−14	−14	−14	−13	−13	−13	−12	−13	−14	−14	−15
(South Africa) Schwartzel	−8	−9	−9	−9	−8	−8	−9	−10	−10	−10	−10	−10	−10	−11	−12	−13	−14	−15
(United States) Mahan	−9	−10	−11	−11	−11	−11	−12	−13	−13	−13	−12	−12	−12	−13	−13	−14	−14	−14
(South Africa) Oosthuizen	−13	−13	−13	−12	−12	−13	−14	−14	−14	−14	−14	−14	−14	−14	−14	−14	−14	−14
(England) Rose	−8	−9	−9	−10	−10	−10	−10	−11	−12	−12	−12	−12	−12	−13	−13	−14	−14	−14

Cumulative tournament scores, relative to par
