= 2006 EPD Tour =

Golf tour season

2006 EPD Tour season
- Duration: 8 February 2006 – 3 October 2006
- Number of official events: 18
- Most wins: (Germany) Martin Kaymer (5)
- Order of Merit: (Germany) Martin Kaymer

The 2006 EPD Tour, titled as the 2006 Renault EPD Tour for sponsorship reasons, was the 10th season of the EPD Tour, a third-tier tour recognised by the European Tour.

== Schedule ==
The following table lists official events during the 2006 season.

Date	Tournament	Host country	Purse (€)	Winner (Note: The number in brackets after each winner's name is the number of EPD Tour events they had won up to and including that tournament. It is rare for someone to accumulate many wins on the EPD Tour as success at this level usually leads to promotion to the Challenge Tour.)
10 Feb	Real de Faula Classic	Spain	20,000	(Netherlands) Robin Swane (1)
17 Feb	Oliva Nova Classic	Spain	30,000	(Spain) Carlos Aguilar (1)
5 Apr	Kempferhof Classic	Germany	20,000	(Germany) Richard Treis (1)
12 Apr	Jakobsberg Classic	Germany	20,000	(Denmark) Mark Schytter (1)
26 Apr	Paderborn Classic	Germany	20,000	(Netherlands) John Bleys (1)
10 May	Gleidingen Classic	Germany	20,000	(Germany) Patrick Niederdrenk (1)
24 May	Haus Bey Classic	Germany	20,000	(Denmark) Lasse Jensen (1)
1 Jun	Friedberg Classic	Germany	20,000	(Germany) Martin Kaymer (2)
14 Jun	Licher Classic	Germany	20,000	(Germany) Marcel Haremza (5)
22 Jun	Habsburg Classic	Germany	20,000	(Germany) Martin Kaymer (3)
27 Jun	Sierra Classic	Poland	20,000	(Germany) Ralf Geilenberg (1)
4 Jul	Coburg Brose Open	Germany	26,000	(Germany) Martin Kaymer (4)
12 Jul	Gut Winterbrock Classic	Germany	20,000	(Germany) Martin Kaymer (5)
26 Jul	Augsburg Classic	Germany	20,000	(Netherlands) John Bleys (2)
17 Aug	Hockenberg Classic	Germany	20,000	(Germany) Martin Kaymer (6)
24 Aug	Sybrook Classic	Netherlands	20,000	(Netherlands) Robin Swane (2)
24 Sep	Schönbuch Open	Germany	20,000	(Germany) Benjamin Miarka (1)
3 Oct	Job AG EPD Championship	Germany	25,000	(Germany) Manuel Kempe (1)

== Order of Merit ==
The Order of Merit was based on prize money won during the season, calculated in Euros. The top five players on the Order of Merit (not otherwise exempt) earned status to play on the 2007 Challenge Tour.

Position	Player	Prize money (€)	Status earned
1	(Germany) Martin Kaymer	26,664	Promoted to European Tour (Top 15 of Challenge Tour Rankings)
2	(Netherlands) Robin Swane	17,416	Promoted to Challenge Tour
3	(Germany) Benjamin Miarka	15,196	Promoted to Challenge Tour
4	(Germany) Manuel Kempe	15,073	Promoted to Challenge Tour
5	(Denmark) Lasse Jensen	14,154	Promoted to Challenge Tour
6	(Germany) Richard Treis	13,467	Promoted to Challenge Tour
7	(England) Matt Green	12,842	
8	(Denmark) Mark Schytter	12,498	
9	(Netherlands) John Bleys	11,434	
10	(France) Émilien Chamaulte	10,812	
