= Tom Collinge (golfer) =

English golfer (1910–1993)

Personal information
- Full name: Thomas Myerscough Collinge
- Nationality: England
- Born: 15 June 1910 Worsley, England
- Died: 6 November 1993 (aged 83) Lancashire, England

Career
- Sport: Golf
- Turned professional: 1929

Best results in major championships
- Masters Tournament: DNP
- PGA Championship: DNP
- U.S. Open: DNP
- The Open Championship: 24th: 1937

Thomas Myerscough Collinge (15 June 1910 – 6 November 1993) was an English professional golfer. He lost the 1936 Penfold Scottish Open in a playoff against Jimmy Adams and played for England against Scotland in 1937.

== Golf career ==
Collinge was professional at Swinton Park, Manchester from 1931 before moving to Olton, Solihull in 1946.

The 1936 Penfold Scottish Open was played at Ayr Belleisle Golf Club. Total prize money was £750. After 72 holes Jimmy Adams and Collinge were tied on 287. In the 36-hole play-off, Adams had rounds of 68 and 69 to win by 11 strokes.

== Results in major championships ==
Tournament	1933	1934	1935	1936	1937	1938	1939
The Open Championship	CUT	T42	T49	38	24		CUT

Tournament	1940	1941	1942	1943	1944	1945	1946	1947	1948	1949	1950
The Open Championship	NT	NT	NT	NT	NT	NT		CUT	CUT	CUT	CUT

Note: Collinge only played in The Open Championship.

Did not play

NT = No tournament
CUT = missed the half-way cut
"T" indicates a tie for a place

== Team appearances ==
- England–Scotland Professional Match (representing England): 1937 (winners)
- Great Britain–Argentina Professional Match (representing Great Britain): 1939 (winners)
