= Loch Lomond Golf Club =

Golf club in Argyll and Bute, Scotland

- Location in Scotland
- 56°04′12″N 4°37′59″W

Club information
- Location: Luss, Argyll & Bute, Scotland
- Established: 1993, 33 years ago
- Type: Private
- Owner: Loch Lomond Golf Club, Members Committee
- Total holes: 18
- Tournaments: Scottish Open (2001–2010); Solheim Cup (2000)
- Website: lochlomond.com

Loch Lomond Course
- Designed by: Tom Weiskopf
- Par: 71
- Length: 7,100 yards (6,492 m)
- Course record: 62, Retief Goosen

Loch Lomond Golf Club is located in Luss, Argyll & Bute, Scotland on the shore of Loch Lomond. The course occupies land previously held by Clan Colquhoun and includes the clan's seat of Rossdhu House as its clubhouse.

== History ==
The ruins of Rossdhu Castle

While Clan Colquhoun had occupied the site of the present club since ancient times, the medieval Rossdhu Castle was constructed by Sir John Colquhoun in 1457 along with the private chapel of St. Mary of Rossdhu when his lands were consolidated into the free Barony of Luss. Rossdhu is derived from the Scottish Gaelic ros dubh, meaning the "black headland".

Mary, Queen of Scots visited in 1563 and her household ate a fish supper on 17 July including salmon, ling, and trout cooked in butter. The castle was ruined in a fire after the construction of Rossdhu Mansion and ruins can be seen directly behind the course's 18th green.

The central portion of the present house, known as Rossdhu Mansion, was completed in 1773. The grand Georgian manor house was constructed by Sir James Colquhoun and was likely designed by well-known architect John Baxter to replace the 15th-century castle, though no documentation survives. This was the family seat when Sir James Colquhoun, 3rd Baronet led the clan and the writer Janet Colquhoun was his wife.

Until the late 1970s, the house was home to Sir Ivar Colquhoun, 8th Baronet, and Lady Colquhoun. They loaned many original pieces of furniture and artwork to the restored manor house in 1994, thus assuring that Rossdhu Mansion would be historically preserved notwithstanding ownership by the club.

== Ownership and Paradise Papers revelations ==
In 2025, investigative journalism outlet The Ferret uncovered previously unknown details about the ownership of Loch Lomond Golf Club through leaked Paradise Papers documents. The club is owned and operated by a firm incorporated in the Cayman Islands, a British overseas territory known for its financial secrecy. As of 2014, the ownership of Loch Lomond Golf Club Limited included over 500 secret shareholders, comprising politicians, business executives, bankers, and sports personalities. Notable shareholders identified in the documents included:

- Footballers: Ally McCoist, Alan Shearer, and Ian Wright
- Cricket coach: Paul Collingwood
- Golfer: Gordon Sherry
- Business executives from companies such as Barclays bank and Deloitte
- Labour politician and party donor Baron William Haughey
- Deceased Kuwaiti businessman Fahad Al-Rajaan

The club's ownership structure came under scrutiny due to its incorporation in a secrecy jurisdiction, raising questions about transparency and tax implications. While there was no indication of tax abuse, the club reportedly ran losses in most years since the member buyout, thereby avoiding corporate tax liability.

== Membership and exclusivity ==
The club's website emphasizes the exclusivity of membership, stating that "the privilege of membership" and "opportunity to play our extraordinary course" is only extended to those invited by existing members or the club itself. The first-time registration fee for the club was reported to be as high as $165,400.

== Broader context ==
The revelations about Loch Lomond Golf Club's ownership structure came amid ongoing pressure on the U.K. government to ensure its overseas territories and crown dependencies introduce public beneficial ownership registers. The U.K.'s overseas territories have been identified as accounting for nearly a quarter of the world's corporate tax loss in recent years, according to the Tax Justice Network.

== Accommodations ==
Rossdhu Mansion

The club also has a total of 43 suites, located at the Carriage House, Garden Cottages, The Point, and the Loch Shore Lodges for members and their guests staying overnight. This provides increased revenue for the club, as it can stay open throughout the year as a luxury hotel and accommodate visitors for long stays despite the countryside location. Amenities for members and their guests include a pro shop, locker rooms, an on-site health club built inside a historical walled garden which opened in September 2006, two formal dining rooms, and a casual bar and grill. Additional outdoor activities include boat tours of Loch Lomond, fitness programs, hiking, bicycle riding, clay shooting, and game hunting.

== Golf course ==
Designed by Tom Weiskopf and Jay Morrish, the 7,100-yard (6,492 m) course is considered to be among the 100 finest golf courses in the world. In 2005 it was ranked 66th (ranked by Golf Magazine). Opened 33 years ago in 1993, the parkland course makes heavy use of natural hazards such as streams and marshland areas.

Loch Lomond hosted the Scottish Open on the European Tour for ten seasons (from 2001 through 2010; succeeded by Castle Stuart), and European Tour events in each of the previous five seasons.

Former US president Bill Clinton has played Loch Lomond Golf Course.

=== Scorecard ===
Hole	Metres	Yards	Par	Hole	Metres	Yards	Par
1	389	425	4	10	416	455	4
2	416	455	4	11	215	235	3
3	466	510	5	12	379	415	4
4	357	390	4	13	512	560	5
5	174	190	3	14	315	345	4
6	572	625	5	15	379	415	4
7	402	440	4	16	453	495	4
8	146	160	3	17	187	205	3
9	315	345	4	18	398	435	4
Front 9	3237	3540	36	Back 9	3255	3560	35
				Total	6492	7100	71
