= Tournament of Hope =

The Tournament of Hope was a proposed South African golf tournament which was planned to start in 2013. It was originally scheduled to be the fifth World Golf Championship event (WGC) event, but that status was revoked in September 2012.

When first announced, the tournament was to have a purse of US$10 million, which would have been richer than any other golf event. This was later reduced to $8.5 million.

The proposed week of the tournament was the first week of December (summer in South Africa). However that week conflicted with the Chevron World Challenge (hosted by Tiger Woods and sponsored by the United States PGA Tour) and the Nedbank Golf Challenge (sponsored by the Sunshine Tour).

The tournament was unable to secure sponsorship and the tournament was postponed indefinitely.
