= Women's Scottish Open =

Golf tournament

ISPS Handa Women's Scottish Open

Tournament information
- Location: North Ayrshire, Scotland, U.K.
- Established: 1986
- Course: Dundonald Links (2025)
- Par: 72 (in 2024)
- Length: 6,463 yards (5,910 m) (in 2025)
- Tours: Ladies European Tour; LPGA Tour (since 2017)
- Format: Stroke play – 72 holes (54 holes; 2007–2016)
- Prize fund: $2.0 million €1.8 million (est.)
- Month played: July

Tournament record score
- Aggregate: 267 Ayaka Furue (2022); 267 Lottie Woad (2025)
- To par: −21 Ayaka Furue (2022) –21 Lottie Woad (2025)

Current champion
- (England) Lottie Woad

Location map
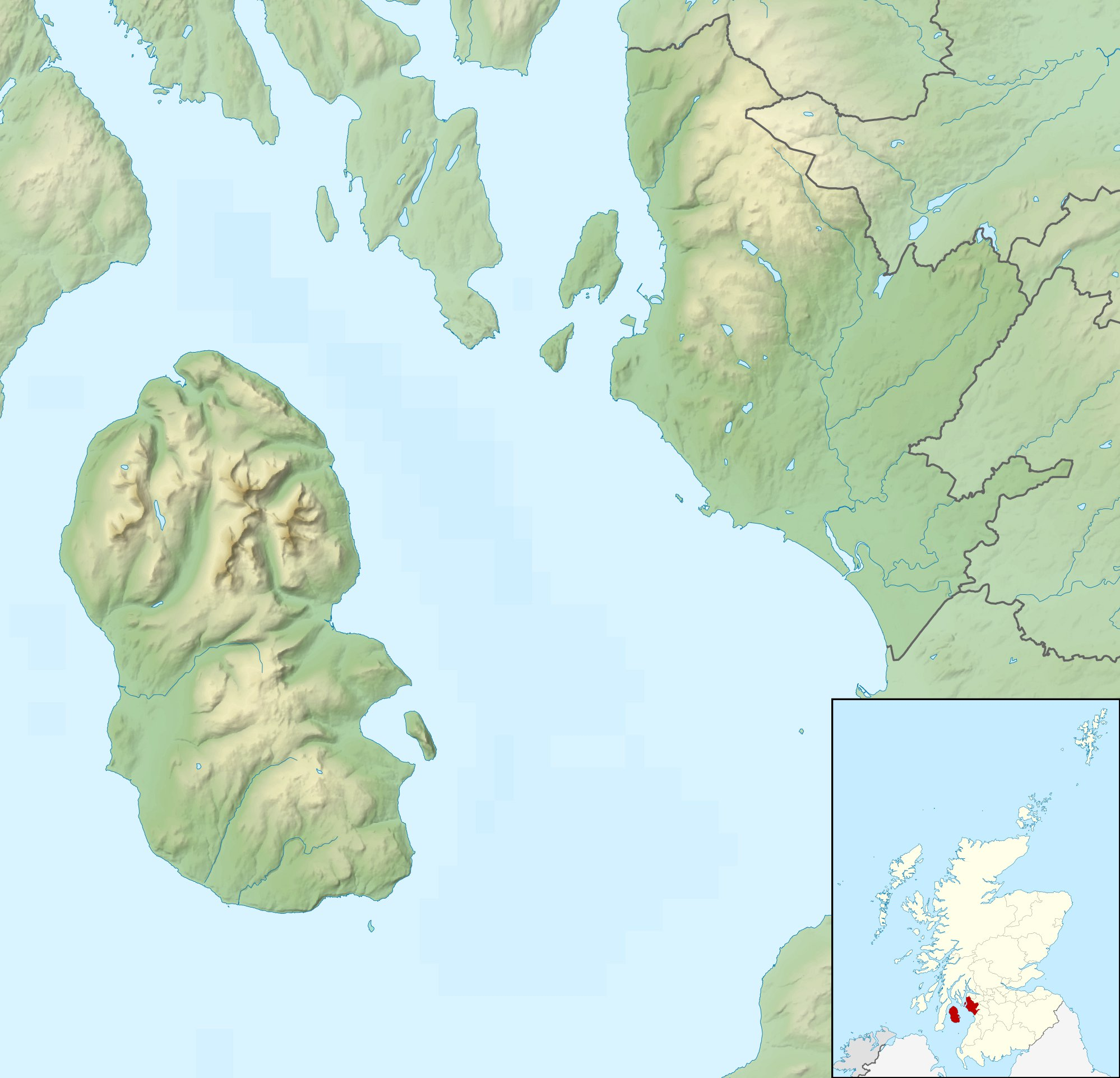
- Location in Scotland Location in North Ayrshire

Women's Scottish Open venues ( 2024 venue)
- Da=Dalmahoy (x3)
- Ca=Cawder (x2)
- TC=The Carrick (x2)
- AL=Archerfield (x5)
- Gu=Gullane (x1)
- Du=Dundonald (x4)
- DL=Dumbarnie (x1)
- Re=Renaissance Club (x2)

The ISPS Handa Women's Scottish Open is a women's professional golf tournament in Scotland on the Ladies European Tour (LET). First played in 1986, it became a regular fixture on the tour schedule in 2010.

Since 2017 it has been co-sanctioned by the LPGA Tour and played in late July, the week prior to the Women's British Open. A 54-hole event from 2007 through 2016, it returned to a 72-hole event. In 2024, the tournament was played in mid-August, after the Olympics in France.

== Winners ==
Year	Tour (Note: LET – Ladies European Tour; LPGA – LPGA Tour)	Venue	Winner	Score	Margin of victory	Runner(s)-up	Winner's share ($)
ISPS Handa Women's Scottish Open
2026	LET, LPGA	Dundonald Links					300,000
2025	LET, LPGA	Dundonald Links	(England) Lottie Woad	267 (−21)	3 strokes	(South Korea) Kim Hyo-joo	300,000
2024	LET, LPGA	Dundonald Links	(United States) Lauren Coughlin	273 (−15)	4 strokes	(Germany) Esther Henseleit	300,000
FreeD Group Women's Scottish Open
2023	LET, LPGA	Dundonald Links	(France) Céline Boutier	273 (−15)	2 strokes	(South Korea) Kim Hyo-joo	300,000
Trust Golf Women's Scottish Open
2022	LET, LPGA	Dundonald Links	(Japan) Ayaka Furue	267 (−21)	3 strokes	(France) Céline Boutier	300,000
2021	LET, LPGA	Dumbarnie Links	(United States) Ryann O'Toole	271 (−17)	3 strokes	(New Zealand) Lydia Ko (Thailand) Atthaya Thitikul	225,000
Aberdeen Standard Investments Ladies Scottish Open
2020	LET, LPGA	Renaissance Club	(United States) Stacy Lewis	279 (−5)	Playoff (Note: Lewis won with a birdie on the first hole of a sudden-death playoff.)	(United States) Cheyenne Knight (Spain) Azahara Muñoz (Denmark) Emily Kristine Pedersen	225,000
2019	LET, LPGA	Renaissance Club	(South Korea) M. J. Hur	264 (−20)	4 strokes	(Thailand) Moriya Jutanugarn (South Korea) Lee Jeong-eun	225,000
2018	LET, LPGA	Gullane GC	(Thailand) Ariya Jutanugarn	271 (−13)	1 stroke	(Australia) Minjee Lee	225,000
Aberdeen Asset Management Ladies Scottish Open
2017	LET, LPGA	Dundonald Links	(South Korea) Lee Mi-hyang	282 (−6)	1 stroke	(South Korea) Mi Jung Hur (Australia) Karrie Webb	225,000
Aberdeen Asset Management Ladies Scottish Open
2016	LET	Dundonald Links	(France) Isabelle Boineau	205 (−11)	1 stroke	(Sweden) Linda Wessberg	75,000
2015	LET	Dundonald Links	(Australia) Rebecca Artis	210 (−6)	2 strokes	(Norway) Suzann Pettersen	75,000
2014	LET	Archerfield Links	(England) Trish Johnson	209 (−7)	2 strokes	(France) Gwladys Nocera	38,654
2013	LET	Archerfield Links	(Scotland) Catriona Matthew	208 (−8)	2 strokes	(England) Hannah Burke	31,537
2012	LET	Archerfield Links	(Scotland) Carly Booth	212 (−4)	1 stroke	(Australia) Frances Bondad (England) Florentyna Parker	32,706
Aberdeen Ladies Scottish Open
2011	LET	Archerfield Links	(Scotland) Catriona Matthew	201 (−15)	10 strokes	(United States) Hannah Jun	33,000
Ladies Scottish Open
2010	LET	Archerfield Links	(France) Virginie Lagoutte-Clément	217 (+1)	1 stroke	(England) Trish Johnson (South Africa) Lee-Anne Pace (England) Sophie Walker	30,000
2009: No tournament
Aberdeen Asset Management Ladies Scottish Open
2008	LET	The Carrick	(France) Gwladys Nocera	208 (−5)	2 strokes	(Sweden) Maria Boden	30,000
De Vere Ladies Scottish Open
2007	LET	The Carrick	(Sweden) Sophie Gustafson	210 (−3)	5 strokes	(England) Danielle Masters (Sweden) Sofia Renell (England) Kirsty Taylor	30,000
1996–2006: No tournament
Payne & Gunter Scottish Open
1995	LET	Dalmahoy Hotel & CC	(England) Alison Nicholas	272 (−16)	1 stroke	(France) Patricia Meunier	£11,250
The New Skoda Women's Scottish Open
1994	LET	Dalmahoy Hotel & CC	(England) Laura Davies	278 (−10)	1 stroke	(Denmark) Karina Orum	£11,250
1989–93: No tournament
Bowring Ladies Scottish Open
1988	LET	Cawder GC	(Scotland) Catherine Panton	293 (+1)	1 stroke	(England) Debbie Dowling (Northern Ireland) Maureen Garner (England) Alison Nicholas	£6,000
1987	LET	Cawder GC	(Scotland) Dale Reid	285 (−3)	Playoff (Note: Reid won on the second hole of a sudden-death playoff after Davies found a water hazard from the tee.)	(England) Laura Davies	£4,500
1986	LET	Dalmahoy Hotel & CC	(United States) Meredith Marshall	283 (−5)	7 strokes	(England) Laura Davies	£4,500

== Tournament records ==
Year	Player	Score	Round
2022	Ayaka Furue	62 (−10)	4th
