= World Golf Championships =

Golf tournaments

The World Golf Championships (WGC) were a group of annual professional golf tournaments played from 1999 through 2023 created by the International Federation of PGA Tours as a means of gathering the best players in the world together more frequently than the pre-existing four major championships. All WGC tournaments were official money events on the PGA Tour and the European Tour, and officially sanctioned by the Asian Tour, Japan Golf Tour, Sunshine Tour, and PGA Tour of Australasia.

The WGC came in four main events: the Championship, the Match Play, the Invitational, and the Champions. The WGC tournaments offered comparable prize money to the major championships. In the pantheon of golf events, the WGCs ranked below the major championships and above most other competitions, although The Players Championship, promoted by the PGA Tour as the "fifth major", may also claim such status.

The World Golf Championships came to an end as the PGA Tour announced the 2023 WGC Match Play would be the last WGC tournament. The COVID-19 pandemic severely hampered the WGCs, as several tournaments were moved and the WGC-HSBC Champions in China was never played again once the pandemic began. As the PGA Tour's conflict with LIV Golf began, the PGA Tour pursued an "elevated status" for some existing events which have some similarities to WGC events (smaller fields, no cut, and higher prize money).

== Events ==
Event	Format
WGC Championship (1999–2021)	Individual stroke play
WGC Match Play (1999–2023)	Individual match play
WGC Invitational (1999–2021)	Individual stroke play
WGC World Cup (2000–2006)	Team stroke play
WGC Champions (2009–2019)	Individual stroke play

The WGC Championship, WGC Match Play and WGC Invitational events all began in 1999, although the WGC Invitational is the direct successor of the World Series of Golf, which began in 1976 and the WGC Match Play is a direct successor to the Andersen Consulting World Championship of Golf which began in 1995. The WGC Championship originally traveled to different venues around the world. After 2006 it found a home at Doral Resort in Florida superseding the Doral Open, a long-standing event on the PGA Tour. Between 2000 and 2006, the men's World Cup was accorded WGC status. The WGC Champions, first held in 2005, was awarded World Golf Championships status starting with the 2009 edition, becoming the fourth WGC tournament on the worldwide calendar.

In April 2011, the Sunshine Tour announced that it would host a fifth WGC event. The event, to be known as the Tournament of Hope, was to be linked to awareness of poverty and HIV/AIDS in Africa. In early 2012 it was announced that the tournament would be played in 2013; later in 2012 it was announced that the tournament would not be a WGC event, but ultimately the tournament never took place.

The WGC concept was introduced to create a larger group of golf tournaments with a high global profile by bringing the leading golfers from different tours together on a more regular basis, rather than just for the major championships. At the time the publicity spoke of a "World Tour" which might develop on the basis of the World Championships and the majors.

The "World Tour" concept seems to have been dropped, but the four events usually attract almost all of the elite players who are eligible to compete and they rank among the most prestigious and high-profile events outside of the majors. The prize money on offer is very close to being the highest for any professional golf tournament. Winners generally receive 70 to 78 Official World Golf Rankings points, the most awarded for any tournament apart from the major championships, which carry 100 points, and The Players Championship, which is allocated 80. (Note: Prior to 2007, the official points allocations were half of these values, but points won in the current year were given a weighting of 2 in the ranking calculation. The system was revised in 2007, so that points are now given an initial weighting of 1, which then tapers to zero over a two-year period starting 13 weeks after the award.) Tiger Woods has dominated these tournaments, winning 16 of the first 32 individual (non-World Cup) events and winning at least one event each year from 1999 to 2009.

From 2000 to 2006 the men's golf World Cup, a tournament for teams of two players representing their country, was a World Golf Championship event, although it was not an official money event on any tour. Beginning in 2007 it is no longer part of the World Golf Championships, but it is still played, and is currently known as the Mission Hills World Cup.

Also from 2000 to 2006, two or three of the four events were staged in the United States in most of the years, and one or two were staged elsewhere. Starting in 2007, all three of the individual World Golf Championships events were played in the United States, which attracted criticism from some golfers, including Tiger Woods and Ernie Els, and in the media outside the United States. PGA Tour Commissioner Tim Finchem responded by insisting that playing in the U.S. is best for golf as more money can be made there than elsewhere. This criticism has been muted since the 2009 elevation of the HSBC Champions, held in China, to full WGC status. In addition, the WGC-Mexico Championship in 2017 marked the move of half the WGC events to outside the United States. At the end of the 2021 season, the number of WGC events was reduced to two, the Match Play and the HSBC Champions. The HSBC Champions was not held between 2020 and 2022 due to the COVID-19 pandemic, and the Match Play will cease following the 2023 edition.

The winners receive Wedgwood trophies named for a golf legend. The HSBC Champions features the Old Tom Morris Cup; the Dell Match Play Championship, the Walter Hagen Cup; the Mexico Championship, the Gene Sarazen Cup; and the FedEx St. Jude Invitational, the Gary Player Cup.

== Winners ==
Year	Championship	Match Play	Invitational	Champions
2023		(United States) Sam Burns		
2022		(United States) Scottie Scheffler		Cancelled due to the COVID-19 pandemic
2021	(United States) Collin Morikawa	(United States) Billy Horschel	(Mexico) Abraham Ancer	Cancelled due to the COVID-19 pandemic
2020	(United States) Patrick Reed (2/2)	Cancelled due to the COVID-19 pandemic	(United States) Justin Thomas (2/2)	Cancelled due to the COVID-19 pandemic
2019	(United States) Dustin Johnson (6/6)	(United States) Kevin Kisner	(United States) Brooks Koepka	(Northern Ireland) Rory McIlroy (3/3)
2018	(United States) Phil Mickelson (3/3)	(United States) Bubba Watson (2/2)	(United States) Justin Thomas (1/2)	(United States) Xander Schauffele
2017	(United States) Dustin Johnson (4/6)	(United States) Dustin Johnson (5/6)	(Japan) Hideki Matsuyama (2/2)	(England) Justin Rose (2/2)
2016	(Australia) Adam Scott (2/2)	(Australia) Jason Day (2/2)	(United States) Dustin Johnson (3/6)	(Japan) Hideki Matsuyama (1/2)
2015	(United States) Dustin Johnson (2/6)	(Northern Ireland) Rory McIlroy (2/3)	(Republic of Ireland) Shane Lowry	(Scotland) Russell Knox
Year	Match Play	Championship	Invitational	Champions
2014	(Australia) Jason Day (1/2)	(United States) Patrick Reed (1/2)	(Northern Ireland) Rory McIlroy (1/3)	(United States) Bubba Watson (1/2)
2013	(United States) Matt Kuchar	(United States) Tiger Woods (17/18)	(United States) Tiger Woods (18/18)	(United States) Dustin Johnson (1/6)
2012	(United States) Hunter Mahan (2/2)	(England) Justin Rose (1/2)	(United States) Keegan Bradley	(England) Ian Poulter (2/2)
2011	(England) Luke Donald	(United States) Nick Watney	(Australia) Adam Scott (1/2)	(Germany) Martin Kaymer
2010	(England) Ian Poulter (1/2)	(South Africa) Ernie Els (2/2)	(United States) Hunter Mahan (1/2)	(Italy) Francesco Molinari
2009	(Australia) Geoff Ogilvy (3/3)	(United States) Phil Mickelson (1/3)	(United States) Tiger Woods (16/18)	(United States) Phil Mickelson (2/3)
2008	(United States) Tiger Woods (15/18)	(Australia) Geoff Ogilvy (2/3)	(Fiji) Vijay Singh	
2007	(Sweden) Henrik Stenson	(United States) Tiger Woods (13/18)	(United States) Tiger Woods (14/18)	
Year	Match Play	Invitational	Championship	World Cup
2006	(Australia) Geoff Ogilvy (1/3)	(United States) Tiger Woods (11/18)	(United States) Tiger Woods (12/18)	(Germany) Bernhard Langer and (Germany) Marcel Siem
2005	(United States) David Toms	(United States) Tiger Woods (9/18)	(United States) Tiger Woods (10/18)	(Wales) Stephen Dodd and (Wales) Bradley Dredge
2004	(United States) Tiger Woods (8/18)	(United States) Stewart Cink	(South Africa) Ernie Els	(England) Paul Casey and (England) Luke Donald
2003	(United States) Tiger Woods (6/18)	(Northern Ireland) Darren Clarke (2/2)	(United States) Tiger Woods (7/18)	(South Africa) Trevor Immelman and (South Africa) Rory Sabbatini
2002	(United States) Kevin Sutherland	(Australia) Craig Parry	(United States) Tiger Woods (5/18)	(Japan) Toshimitsu Izawa and (Japan) Shigeki Maruyama
2001	(United States) Steve Stricker	(United States) Tiger Woods (4/18)	Cancelled due to 9/11	(South Africa) Ernie Els and (South Africa) Retief Goosen
2000	(Northern Ireland) Darren Clarke (1/2)	(United States) Tiger Woods (3/18)	(Canada) Mike Weir	(United States) Tiger Woods and (United States) David Duval
1999	(United States) Jeff Maggert	(United States) Tiger Woods (1/18)	(United States) Tiger Woods (2/18)	

== Multiple winners ==
Dustin Johnson is the only player to win all four individual WGCs. Tiger Woods' 18 WGC victories dwarfs his nearest rival, Johnson, with six. Although not counting as individual wins, Woods also won the then WGC-World Cup with the United States, and 2-time WGC winner Ernie Els won the same competition with South Africa.

Player	Wins	Match Play	Championship	Invitational	Champions
(United States) Tiger Woods	18	3: 2003, 2004, 2008	7: 1999, 2002, 2003, 2005, 2006, 2007, 2013	8: 1999, 2000, 2001, 2005, 2006, 2007, 2009, 2013	—
(United States) Dustin Johnson	6	1: 2017	3: 2015, 2017, 2019	1: 2016	1: 2013
(United States) Phil Mickelson	3	—	2: 2009, 2018	—	1: 2009
(Australia) Geoff Ogilvy	3	2: 2006, 2009	1: 2008	—	—
(Northern Ireland) Rory McIlroy	3	1: 2015	—	1: 2014	1: 2019
(Northern Ireland) Darren Clarke	2	1: 2000	—	1: 2003	—
(Australia) Jason Day	2	2: 2014, 2016	—	—	—
(South Africa) Ernie Els	2	—	2: 2004, 2010	—	—
(United States) Hunter Mahan	2	1: 2012	—	1: 2010	—
(Japan) Hideki Matsuyama	2	—	—	1: 2017	1: 2016
(England) Ian Poulter	2	1: 2010	—	—	1: 2012
(United States) Patrick Reed	2	—	2: 2014, 2020	—	—
(England) Justin Rose	2	—	1: 2012	—	1: 2017
(Australia) Adam Scott	2	—	1: 2016	1: 2011	—
(United States) Justin Thomas	2	—	—	2: 2018, 2020	—
(United States) Bubba Watson	2	1: 2018	—	—	1: 2014

- Note: The World Cup did not count as individual wins, so it is not mentioned here as a part of this table.

== National summary ==
Nation	Total wins	Team wins	Individual wins	Individual winners
United States	49	1	48	20
Australia	8	0	8	4
England	6	1	5	3
Northern Ireland	5	0	5	2
South Africa	4	2	2	1
Japan	3	1	2	1
Germany	2	1	1	1
Canada	1	0	1	1
Fiji	1	0	1	1
Ireland	1	0	1	1
Italy	1	0	1	1
Scotland	1	0	1	1
Sweden	1	0	1	1
Wales	1	1	0	0
