= Dundonald Links =

Scottish golf course

Coordinates: 55°35′04″N 4°39′08″W

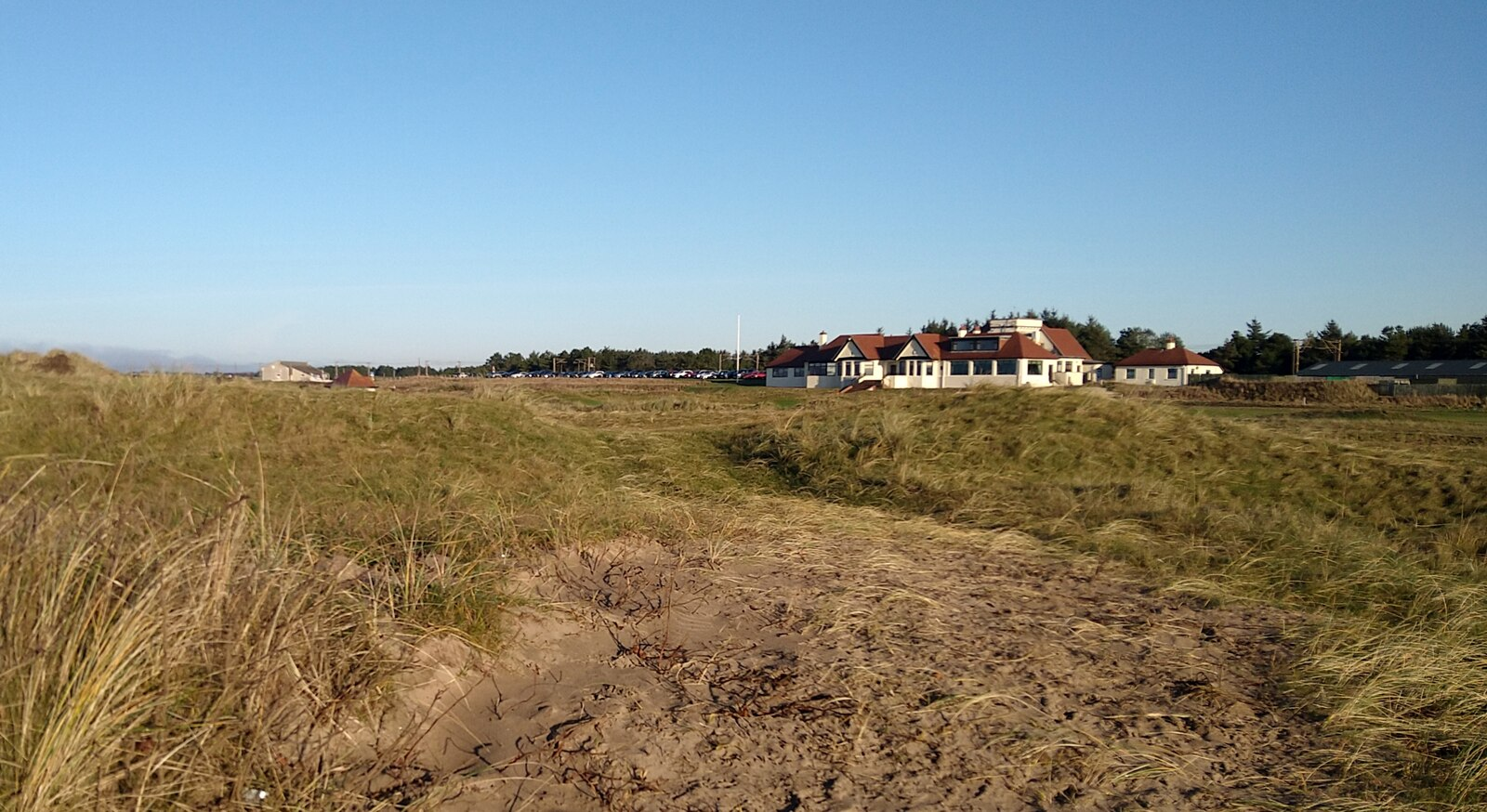
- Interactive map of Dundonald Links

Club information
- Location: North Ayrshire, Scotland
- Established: 1911
- Type: Public
- Owner: Loch Lomond Golf Club
- Tota holes: 18
- Tournaments: Scottish Open (golf) (2017); Women's Scottish Open
- Website: https://dundonaldlinks.com
- Designed by: Willie Fernie

Dundonald Links is a golf course in North Ayrshire, Scotland. The course was designed by Willie Fernie and opened in 1911. It had an extensive renovation in the early 2000s.

In 2017, the course hosted the men’s and women’s Scottish Opens. In 2023, the women's event returned to the course. In 2025, the Women's Scottish Open will again be held at Dundonald.

In 2025, the course's clubhouse was named "Best in Scotland". It was the second time in three years that the clubhouse was awarded this honor.
