= 2013 WGC-HSBC Champions =

Coordinates: 31.109°N 121.216°E

Tournament information
- Dates: 31 October – 3 November 2013
- Location: Shanghai, China
- Course(s): Sheshan Golf Club
- Tour(s): Asian Tour; European Tour; PGA Tour

Statistics
- Par: 72
- Length: 7,266 yards (6,644 m)
- Field: 78 players
- Cut: None
- Prize fund: $8,500,000 €6,145,172
- Winner's share: $1,400,000 €1,012,146

Champion
- (United States) Dustin Johnson
- 264 (−24)

Location in China

The 2013 WGC-HSBC Champions was a golf tournament played from 31 October to 3 November at the Sheshan Golf Club in Shanghai, China. It was the fifth WGC-HSBC Champions tournament, and the fourth of four World Golf Championships events held in the 2013 calendar year.

Dustin Johnson broke the tournament scoring record for his first WGC win; he finished three strokes ahead of runner-up Ian Poulter, the defending champion.

== Course ==
Hole	1	2	3	4	5	6	7	8	9	Out	10	11	12	13	14	15	16	17	18	In	Total
Yards	459	550	362	200	456	200	346	603	486	3,662	401	456	217	411	594	487	288	212	538	3,604	7,266
Par	4	5	4	3	4	3	4	5	4	36	4	4	3	4	5	4	4	3	5	36	72

== Field ==
The following is a list of players who qualified for the 2013 WGC-HSBC Champions. Players who qualify from multiple categories will be listed in the first category in which they are eligible with the other qualifying categories in parentheses next to the player's name.

This was the first WGC event for 11 players: Baek Seuk-hyun, Graham DeLaet, Tommy Fleetwood, Huang Mingjie, Huang Wenyi, Jin Jeong, Masahiro Kawamura, Li Haotong, Jordan Spieth, Peter Uihlein and Jimmy Walker.

1. Winners of the four major championships and The Players Championship

Jason Dufner (12), Phil Mickelson (3,5,12), Justin Rose (12)

- Qualified but did not play: Adam Scott (3,9,12), Tiger Woods (2,3,12)

2. Winners of the previous four World Golf Championships

Ian Poulter (12)

- Qualified but did not play: Matt Kuchar (3,12)

3. Winners of the top 20 rated PGA Tour events

Jonas Blixt (12), Ken Duke, Derek Ernst, Brian Gay, Bill Haas (12), Billy Horschel (12), Graeme McDowell (5,12), John Merrick, D. A. Points, Henrik Stenson (8,12), Kevin Streelman (12), Michael Thompson, Boo Weekley (12)

- Qualified but did not play: Zach Johnson (12)

4. Top 5 available players from the FedEx Cup points list

Graham DeLaet (12), Dustin Johnson (12), Brandt Snedeker (12), Jordan Spieth (12), Nick Watney (12)

- Qualified but did not play: Webb Simpson (12), Steve Stricker (12)

5. Winners of the top 20 rated European Tour events

Thomas Bjørn (12), Grégory Bourdy, Paul Casey, Jamie Donaldson (12), Ernie Els (12), Gonzalo Fernández-Castaño, Tommy Fleetwood, Stephen Gallacher, David Howell, Raphaël Jacquelin, David Lynn (12), Matteo Manassero (10,12), Rory McIlroy (12), Louis Oosthuizen (12), Brett Rumford (10), Chris Wood

- Qualified but did not play: Joost Luiten

6. Top 5 available players from the Race to Dubai

Sergio García (10,12), Branden Grace (8,12), Mikko Ilonen, Richard Sterne (8,12), Peter Uihlein

- Qualified but did not play: Charl Schwartzel (10,12)

7. Four players - winners of the top Japan Golf Tour events, remainder from Order of Merit

Luke Donald (12), Hiroyuki Fujita, Ryo Ishikawa, Masahiro Kawamura

8. Four players - winners of the top Sunshine Tour events, remainder from Order of Merit

George Coetzee (OoM), Darren Fichardt, Martin Kaymer (12), Jaco van Zyl (OoM)

9. Four players - winners of the top PGA Tour of Australasia events, remainder from Order of Merit

Mark Brown (OoM), Michael Hendry (OoM), Jin Jeong, Daniel Popovic

- Qualified but did not play: Peter Senior

10. Six players - winners of the top Asian Tour events, remainder from Order of Merit

Kiradech Aphibarnrat, Baek Seuk-hyun (OoM), Gaganjeet Bhullar (OoM), Scott Hend (OoM), Thongchai Jaidee (OoM), Miguel Ángel Jiménez (12)

11. Six players from China

Huang Mingjie, Huang Wenyi, Li Haotong, Liang Wenchong, Hu Mu, Wu Ashun

12. Any players, not included in above categories, in the top 50 of the OWGR on 14 October 2013

Keegan Bradley, Rickie Fowler, Peter Hanson, Hideki Matsuyama, Francesco Molinari, Ryan Moore, Scott Piercy, Bo Van Pelt, Jimmy Walker, Bubba Watson, Lee Westwood

- Qualified but did not play: Jason Day, Jim Furyk, Hunter Mahan

13. Alternates, if needed to fill the field of 78 players

None needed

- Winner of 21st ranked PGA Tour event
- Winner of 21st ranked European Tour event
- Next available player, not otherwise exempt, from OWGR as of 14 October, Race to Dubai as of 14 October, FedEx Cup list, repeating as necessary

== Round summaries ==
=== First round ===
Thursday, 31 October 2013

Place	Player	Score	To par
1	(Northern Ireland) Rory McIlroy	65	−7
T2	(Wales) Jamie Donaldson	67	−5
T2	(Spain) Gonzalo Fernández-Castaño	67	−5
T4	(England) Tommy Fleetwood	68	−4
T4	(England) Justin Rose	68	−4
T4	(United States) Jordan Spieth	68	−4
T4	(United States) Bubba Watson	68	−4
T8	(Thailand) Kiradech Aphibarnrat	69	−3
T8	(India) Gaganjeet Bhullar	69	−3
T8	(England) Paul Casey	69	−3
T8	(South Africa) Ernie Els	69	−3
T8	(Australia) Scott Hend	69	−3
T8	(United States) Dustin Johnson	69	−3
T8	(Northern Ireland) Graeme McDowell	69	−3

=== Second round ===
Friday, 1 November 2013

Place	Player	Score	To par
1	(United States) Dustin Johnson	69-63=132	−12
T2	(Northern Ireland) Rory McIlroy	65-72=137	−7
T2	(United States) Bubba Watson	68-69=137	−7
T2	(United States) Boo Weekley	70-67=137	−7
T5	(South Africa) Ernie Els	69-69=138	−6
T5	(Spain) Gonzalo Fernández-Castaño	67-71=138	−6
T5	(England) Tommy Fleetwood	68-70=138	−6
T5	(Spain) Sergio García	70-68=138	−6
T5	(Northern Ireland) Graeme McDowell	69-69=138	−6
T5	(England) Ian Poulter	71-67=138	−6

=== Third round ===
Saturday, 2 November 2013

Place	Player	Score	To par
1	(United States) Dustin Johnson	69-63-66=198	−18
2	(England) Ian Poulter	71-67-63=201	−15
3	(Northern Ireland) Graeme McDowell	69-69-64=202	−14
T4	(Canada) Graham DeLaet	71-68-65=204	−12
T4	(Northern Ireland) Rory McIlroy	65-72-67=204	−12
T4	(England) Justin Rose	68-71-65=204	−12
T7	(Germany) Martin Kaymer	70-74-62=206	−10
T7	(United States) Bubba Watson	68-69-69=206	−10
T7	(United States) Boo Weekley	70-67-69=206	−10
T10	(United States) Keegan Bradley	71-68-68=207	−9
T10	(Wales) Jamie Donaldson	67-74-66=207	−9
T10	(England) Tommy Fleetwood	68-70-69=207	−9
T10	(Spain) Sergio García	70-68-69=207	−9

=== Final round ===
Sunday, 3 November 2013

Place	Player	Score	To par	Money ($)
1	(United States) Dustin Johnson	69-63-66-66=264	−24	1,400,000
2	(England) Ian Poulter	71-67-63-66=267	−21	850,000
3	(Northern Ireland) Graeme McDowell	69-69-64-66=268	−20	480,000
4	(Spain) Sergio García	70-68-69-63=270	−18	365,000
5	(England) Justin Rose	68-71-65-68=272	−16	300,000
T6	(Canada) Graham DeLaet	71-68-65-69=273	−15	231,500
T6	(Northern Ireland) Rory McIlroy	65-72-67-69=273	−15	231,500
T8	(Wales) Jamie Donaldson	67-74-66-67=274	−14	161,667
T8	(Germany) Martin Kaymer	70-74-62-68=274	−14	161,667
T8	(United States) Bubba Watson	68-69-69-68=274	−14	161,667

==== Scorecard ====
Eagle	Birdie	Bogey	Double bogey

Hole	1	2	3	4	5	6	7	8	9	10	11	12	13	14	15	16	17	18
Par	4	5	4	3	4	3	4	5	4	4	4	3	4	5	4	4	3	5
(United States) Johnson	−17	−17	−17	−17	−17	−17	−17	−18	−19	−19	−19	−19	−20	−21	−21	−23	−24	−24
(England) Poulter	−16	−17	−17	−17	−18	−18	−18	−19	−19	−19	−19	−20	−20	−21	−20	−21	−21	−21
(Northern Ireland) McDowell	−15	−16	−17	−17	−17	−17	−18	−18	−18	−18	−18	−19	−19	−20	−20	−20	−20	−20
(Spain) García	−9	−10	−11	−11	−11	−11	−12	−13	−14	−15	−15	−15	−16	−17	−17	−18	−18	−18
(England) Rose	−12	−12	−13	−14	−14	−14	−14	−14	−14	−14	−15	−15	−15	−16	−16	−16	−16	−16
(Canada) DeLaet	−11	−12	−12	−12	−10	−10	−10	−11	−11	−11	−11	−11	−12	−13	−13	−14	−14	−15
(Northern Ireland) McIlroy	−12	−13	−13	−13	−14	−14	−14	−14	−14	−14	−14	−14	−14	−15	−15	−15	−15	−15

Cumulative tournament scores, relative to par
