= 2012 BMW PGA Championship =

Tournament information
- Dates: 24–27 May 2012
- Location: Surrey, England; 51.40°N 0.59°W
- Course: Wentworth Club
- Tour: European Tour

Statistics
- Par: 72
- Length: 7,302 yards (6,677 m)
- Field: 150 players, 72 after cut
- Cut: 145 (+1)
- Prize fund: €4,500,000
- Winner's share: €750,000

Champion
- (England) Luke Donald
- 273 (−15)

Location map
- Location in England Location in Surrey

The 2012 BMW PGA Championship was the 58th edition of the BMW PGA Championship, an annual golf tournament on the 2012 European Tour, contested 24–27 May at Wentworth Club in Surrey, England. Englishman Luke Donald successfully defended his PGA Championship title and regained the World Number One status.

== Course layout ==
Wentworth Club, West Course
Tee	Rating/Slope	1	2	3	4	5	6	7	8	9	Out	10	11	12	13	14	15	16	17	18	In	Total
Yardage	n/a	473	154	465	552	203	418	396	391	449	3,501	184	416	531	470	179	489	383	610	539	3,801	7,302
Par		4	3	4	5	3	4	4	4	4	35	3	4	5	4	3	4	4	5	5	37	72

== Round summaries ==
=== First round (Thursday) ===
Place	Player	Score	To par
T1	(Scotland) David Drysdale	66	−6
T1	(Republic of Ireland) Peter Lawrie	66	−6
T3	(Wales) Jamie Donaldson	67	−5
T3	(England) Justin Rose	67	−5
T3	(Spain) Álvaro Quirós	67	−5
T3	(Sweden) Richard Johnson	67	−5
T3	(Sweden) Niclas Fasth	67	−5
T8	(Scotland) Marc Warren	68	−4
T8	(England) Robert Rock	68	−4
T8	(South Africa) Ernie Els	68	−4
T8	(Austria) Bernd Wiesberger	68	−4
T8	(England) Kenneth Ferrie	68	−4
T8	(Scotland) Scott Jamieson	68	−4
T8	(Denmark) Mark Haastrup	68	−4
T8	(England) James Morrison	68	−4
T8	(Spain) Rafa Cabrera-Bello	68	−4
T8	(Italy) Francesco Molinari	68	−4
T8	(England) Luke Donald	68	−4
T8	(Sweden) Peter Hedblom	68	−4

=== Second round (Friday) ===
Place	Player	Score	To par
1	(England) James Morrison	68-64=132	−12
T2	(England) Luke Donald	68-68=136	−8
T2	(Scotland) David Drysdale	66-70=136	−8
T4	(Spain) Álvaro Quirós	67-70=137	−7
T4	(Republic of Ireland) Peter Lawrie	66-71=137	−7
T6	(Germany) Marcel Siem	71-67=138	−6
T6	(Argentina) Ricardo González	71-67=138	−6
T6	(Sweden) Fredrik Andersson Hed	70-68=138	−6
T6	(South Africa) Branden Grace	69-69=138	−6
T6	(Spain) Rafa Cabrera-Bello	68-70=138	−6
T6	(Italy) Francesco Molinari	68-70=138	−6
T6	(Sweden) Peter Hedblom	68-70=138	−6
T6	(England) Justin Rose	67-71=138	−6

=== Third round (Saturday) ===
Place	Player	Score	To par
1	(England) Luke Donald	68-68-69=205	−11
2	(England) Justin Rose	67-71-69=207	−9
3	(Republic of Ireland) Peter Lawrie	66-71-72=209	−7
T4	(South Africa) Ernie Els	68-73-70=211	−5
T4	(Scotland) Paul Lawrie	69-71-71=211	−5
T4	(South Africa) Richard Sterne	71-68-72=211	−5
T4	(South Africa) Branden Grace	69-69-73=211	−5
T8	(Sweden) Peter Hedblom	68-70-74=212	−4
T8	(Spain) Rafa Cabrera-Bello	68-70-74=212	−4
T8	(Italy) Francesco Molinari	68-70-74=212	−4

=== Final round (Sunday) ===
Luke Donald started the final round with a two-stroke lead over countryman Justin Rose. After being caught by Justin Rose four holes into the final round, Donald birdied 6, 7 and 10 to gain a three shot lead. The gap went to five at the 16th when Donald made another birdie, while Rose bogeyed after hitting a bunker. Paul Lawrie hit a best-of-the-day 66 to catch Rose. They finished tied second with a final score of −11, four shots behind champion Donald. Luke Donald is only the third player, after Nick Faldo and Colin Montgomerie, to win successive PGA Championship titles. He also regained the World Number One ranking by retaining his title.

Place	Player	Score	To par	Money (€)
1	(England) Luke Donald	68-68-69-68=273	−15	750,000
T2	(Scotland) Paul Lawrie	69-71-71-66=277	−11	390,850
T2	(England) Justin Rose	67-71-69-70=277	−11	390,850
4	(Republic of Ireland) Peter Lawrie	66-71-72-71=280	−8	225,000
5	(South Africa) Branden Grace	69-69-73-70=281	−7	190,800
6	(South Africa) Richard Sterne	71-68-72-71=282	−6	157,500
T7	(Germany) Marcel Siem	71-67-76-69=283	−5	116,100
T7	(Italy) Francesco Molinari	68-70-74-71=283	−5	116,100
T7	(South Africa) Ernie Els	68-73-70-72=283	−5	116,100
T10	(Republic of Ireland) David Higgins	70-70-74-70=284	−4	78,300
T10	(Spain) Álvaro Quirós	67-70-77-70=284	−4	78,300
T10	(Scotland) David Drysdale	66-70-78-70=284	−4	78,300
T10	(England) Ian Poulter	71-73-69-71=284	−4	78,300
T10	(England) James Morrison	68-64-81-71=284	−4	78,300
