= 2012 WGC-HSBC Champions =

Coordinates: 22.785°N 114.004°E

Tournament information
- Dates: 1–4 November 2012
- Location: Shenzhen, China
- Courses: Mission Hills Golf Club; Olazabal Course
- Tours: Asian Tour; European Tour; PGA Tour (unofficial)

Statistics
- Par: 72
- Length: 7,251 yards (6,630 m)
- Field: 78 players
- Cut: None
- Prize fund: $7,000,000 €5,374,693
- Winner's share: $1,200,000 €921,376

Champion
- (England) Ian Poulter
- 267 (−21)

Location in China

The 2012 WGC-HSBC Champions was a golf tournament played 1–4 November 2012 at the Olazabal Course of Mission Hills Golf Club in Shenzhen, China. It was the fourth WGC-HSBC Champions tournament, and the fourth of four World Golf Championships events held in 2012. The event was won by Ryder Cup star Ian Poulter who shot consecutive rounds of 65 (−7) on the weekend and broke the tournament scoring record with 267 (−21) for his second WGC win. Two strokes back were runners-up Jason Dufner, Ernie Els, Phil Mickelson, and Scott Piercy.

== Field ==
The following is a list of players who have qualified for the 2012 WGC-HSBC Champions. Players who have qualified from multiple categories are listed in the first category in which they are eligible. The numbers of other qualifying categories are in parentheses next to the player's name.

1. Winners of the four major championships and The Players Championship

Ernie Els (12), Bubba Watson (12)

- Qualified but did not play: Matt Kuchar (12), Rory McIlroy (3,10,12), Webb Simpson (12)

2. Winners of the previous four World Golf Championships

Keegan Bradley (12), Martin Kaymer, Justin Rose (12)

- Qualified but did not play: Hunter Mahan (3,12)

3. Winners of the top 23 rated PGA Tour events (32 events met rating)

Luke Donald (5,12), Jason Dufner (12), Bill Haas, Marc Leishman, Phil Mickelson (12), Carl Pettersson, Scott Piercy, Brandt Snedeker (12), Kyle Stanley, Johnson Wagner, Nick Watney (12)

- Qualified but did not play: Rickie Fowler, Tommy Gainey, Zach Johnson (12), Steve Stricker (12), Tiger Woods (12)

4. Top 5 available players from the FedEx Cup points list

Robert Garrigus, Dustin Johnson (12), Louis Oosthuizen (8,10,12), Adam Scott (12), Lee Westwood (5,8,12)

- Qualified but did not play: Jim Furyk (12), Sergio García (12), Ryan Moore, Bo Van Pelt (9,12)

5. Winners of the top 23 rated European Tour events (22 events met rating)

Rafa Cabrera-Bello, Nicolas Colsaerts, Jamie Donaldson, Gonzalo Fernández-Castaño (10), Branden Grace (8), Peter Hanson (12), Paul Lawrie, Shane Lowry, Francesco Molinari, Julien Quesne, Álvaro Quirós, Richie Ramsay, Robert Rock, Marcel Siem, Jeev Milkha Singh, Thongchai Jaidee, Danny Willett

6. Top 5 available players from the Race to Dubai

David Lynn, Graeme McDowell (12), Thorbjørn Olesen, Ian Poulter (9), Bernd Wiesberger (10)

7. Five players - winners of the top Japan Golf Tour events, remainder from Order of Merit (14 events met rating)

Hiroyuki Fujita, Yuta Ikeda (OoM), Brendan Jones (OoM), Toshinori Muto, Tadahiro Takayama

- Qualified but did not play: Toru Taniguchi

8. Five players - winners of the top Sunshine Tour events, remainder from Order of Merit (5 events met rating)

Thomas Aiken (OoM), George Coetzee (OoM), Garth Mulroy, Hennie Otto, Jaco van Zyl (OoM)

9. Five players - winners of the top PGA Tour of Australasia events, remainder from Order of Merit (4 events met rating)

Robert Allenby (OoM), Greg Chalmers, Marcus Fraser (OoM), Brad Kennedy (OoM), John Senden (OoM)

10. Nine players - winners of the top Asian Tour events, remainder from Order of Merit (8 events met rating)

Gaganjeet Bhullar (OoM), Scott Hend (OoM), Masanori Kobayashi (OoM), Jbe' Kruger, David Lipsky (OoM), Joost Luiten, Prom Meesawat (OoM), Siddikur Rahman (OoM), Thaworn Wiratchant (OoM)

11. Four players from China

Hu Mu, Liang Wenchong, Wu Ashun, Zhang Xinjun

12. Any players, not included in above categories, in the top 25 of the OWGR on October 15, 2012

13. If needed to fill the field of 78 players, winners of additional tournaments, ordered by field strength (9 from PGA Tour, 9 from Japan Golf Tour), alternating with those players ranked after the top 25 in OWGR on October 15, 2012

Players in bold were added to the field through this category. Players listed in "()" already qualified in a previous category. Players listed with their ~~name stricken~~ did not play or were not listed as alternates when the field was announced.

Tournament winners		From OWGR
Tournament	Winner	Ranked player
2012 FedEx St. Jude Classic	(Dustin Johnson)	(Ian Poulter)
2012 HP Byron Nelson Championship	(Jason Dufner)	~~Jason Day~~
2012 Wyndham Championship	~~(Sergio García)~~	~~(Rickie Fowler)~~
2012 Humana Challenge	**Mark Wilson**	(Paul Lawrie)
2012 Greenbrier Classic	~~Ted Potter Jr.~~	(Francesco Molinari)
2012 John Deere Classic	~~(Zach Johnson)~~	~~Charl Schwartzel~~
2012 Valero Texas Open	~~Ben Curtis~~	(Carl Pettersson)
2012 Justin Timberlake Open	~~(Ryan Moore)~~	(Martin Kaymer)
2012 Mynavi ABC Championship	**Han Lee**	(Bill Haas)
2012 Japan Open	**Kenichi Kuboya**	(Nicolas Colsaerts)
2012 Asia-Pacific Panasonic Open	(Masanori Kobayashi)	(Gonzalo Fernández-Castaño)
2012 Frys.com Open	~~Jonas Blixt~~	(Branden Grace)
2012 ANA Open	(Hiroyuki Fujita)	(John Senden)
2012 Mizuno Open	(Brad Kennedy)	~~(Ryan Moore)~~
2012 Diamond Cup Golf	(Hiroyuki Fujita)	~~(David Toms)~~
2012 Tsuruya Open	(Hiroyuki Fujita)	~~K. J. Choi~~
2011 Mitsui Sumitomo Visa Taiheiyo Masters	~~Hideki Matsuyama~~	(David Lynn)
2012 Vana H Cup KBC Augusta	**Kim Hyung-sung**	(Robert Garrigus)
2012 The Crowns	**Jang Ik-jae**	**Geoff Ogilvy**
		**Thomas Bjørn**

12 players were appearing in their first WGC event: Robert Garrigus, Scott Hend, Hu Mu, Jang Ik-jae, Brad Kennedy, Kim Hyung-sung, Masanori Kobayashi, Han Lee, David Lipsky, David Lynn, Thorbjørn Olesen and Julien Quesne.

== Round summaries ==
=== First round ===
Thursday, 1 November 2012

Place	Player	Score	To par
T1	(South Africa) Louis Oosthuizen	65	−7
T1	(Australia) Adam Scott	65	−7
T3	(Sweden) Peter Hanson	66	−6
T3	(Republic of Ireland) Shane Lowry	66	−6
T3	(United States) Phil Mickelson	66	−6
T3	(United States) Bubba Watson	66	−6
T7	(United States) Dustin Johnson	67	−5
T7	(Thailand) Prom Meesawat	67	−5
T9	(South Africa) Thomas Aiken	68	−4
T9	(England) Luke Donald	68	−4
T9	(United States) Jason Dufner	68	−4
T9	(South Korea) Jang Ik-jae	68	−4
T9	(Germany) Martin Kaymer	68	−4
T9	(United States) Scott Piercy	68	−4
T9	(China) Wu Ashun	68	−4

=== Second round ===
Friday, 2 November 2012

Place	Player	Score	To par
1	(South Africa) Louis Oosthuizen	65-63=128	−16
T2	(South Africa) Ernie Els	70-63=133	−11
T2	(Australia) Adam Scott	65-68=133	−11
T4	(United States) Jason Dufner	68-66=134	−10
T4	(Republic of Ireland) Shane Lowry	66-68=134	−10
T6	(United States) Dustin Johnson	67-68=135	−9
T6	(United States) Phil Mickelson	66-69=135	−9
T8	(England) Luke Donald	68-68=136	−8
T8	(United States) Bill Haas	69-67=136	−8
T8	(Denmark) Thorbjørn Olesen	71-65=136	−8
T8	(United States) Scott Piercy	68-68=136	−8

=== Third round ===
Saturday, 3 November 2012

Place	Player	Score	To par
T1	(South Africa) Louis Oosthuizen	65-63-70=198	−18
T1	(England) Lee Westwood	70-67-61=198	−18
3	(United States) Phil Mickelson	66-69-66=201	−15
T4	(South Africa) Ernie Els	70-63-69=202	−14
T4	(United States) Bill Haas	69-67-66=202	−14
T4	(England) Ian Poulter	69-68-65=202	−14
7	(United States) Brandt Snedeker	72-71-60=203	−13
T8	(India) Gaganjeet Bhullar	73-68-63=204	−12
T8	(Germany) Martin Kaymer	68-69-67=204	−12
T8	(Sweden) Carl Pettersson	70-68-66=204	−12
T8	(United States) Scott Piercy	68-68-68=204	−12
T8	(Australia) Adam Scott	65-68-71=204	−12

=== Final round ===
Sunday, 4 November 2012

Place	Player	Score	To par	Money ($)
1	(England) Ian Poulter	69-68-65-65=267	−21	1,200,000
T2	(United States) Jason Dufner	68-66-71-64=269	−19	417,500
T2	(South Africa) Ernie Els	70-63-69-67=269	−19	417,500
T2	(United States) Phil Mickelson	66-69-66-68=269	−19	417,500
T2	(United States) Scott Piercy	68-68-68-65=269	−19	417,500
T6	(South Africa) Louis Oosthuizen	65-63-70-72=270	−18	190,000
T6	(England) Lee Westwood	70-67-61-72=270	−18	190,000
8	(Australia) Adam Scott	65-68-71-67=271	−17	155,000
9	(Germany) Martin Kaymer	68-69-67-68=272	−16	140,000
10	(United States) Bill Haas	69-67-66-71=271	−15	125,000

==== Scorecard ====
Eagle	Birdie	Bogey	Double bogey

Hole	1	2	3	4	5	6	7	8	9	10	11	12	13	14	15	16	17	18
Par	4	3	5	4	3	4	5	3	5	4	5	4	3	4	5	4	3	4
(England) Poulter	−14	−15	−16	−16	−16	−16	−17	−18	−18	−19	−20	−20	−20	−21	−22	−22	−21	−21
(United States) Dufner	−11	−11	−12	−12	−12	−12	−13	−13	−14	−15	−16	−15	−16	−17	−17	−18	−19	−19
(South Africa) Els	−14	−14	−15	−16	−16	−16	−17	−18	−19	−19	−19	−19	−19	−18	−19	−19	−19	−19
(United States) Mickelson	−16	−16	−17	−17	−17	−17	−18	−18	−19	−19	−20	−19	−19	−19	−20	−20	−19	−19
(United States) Piercy	−12	−12	−14	−14	−14	−14	−14	−15	−15	−15	−16	−17	−17	−16	−17	−18	−19	−19
(South Africa) Oosthuizen	−17	−17	−17	−17	−18	−18	−19	−18	−18	−17	−18	−18	−18	−17	−18	−18	−18	−18
(England) Westwood	−18	−18	−19	−20	−18	−19	−19	−20	−20	−19	−19	−18	−18	−18	−17	−17	−17	−18

Cumulative tournament scores, relative to par

== Video ==
- Golf Channel – 2012 WGC-HSBC – final round highlights
