= 2012 European Tour =

Golf tour season

2012 European Tour season
- Duration: 5 January 2012 – 25 November 2012
- Number of official events: 45 (Note: A further four tournaments were scheduled but were cancelled.)
- Most wins: (South Africa) Branden Grace (4)
- Race to Dubai: (Northern Ireland) Rory McIlroy
- Golfer of the Year: (Northern Ireland) Rory McIlroy
- Players' Player of the Year: (Northern Ireland) Rory McIlroy
- Sir Henry Cotton Rookie of the Year: (Portugal) Ricardo Santos

The 2012 European Tour was the 41st season of the European Tour, the main professional golf tour in Europe since its inaugural season in 1972.

== Changes for 2012 ==
Prior to the start of the 2011 season, the tour had announced their intention to realign the schedule with the calendar. As a result, in 2012 there were several changes from the previous season. There was initially one new tournament in 2012, the ISPS Handa Perth International, and several tournaments were dropped: the Castelló Masters, the Iskandar Johor Open, and the Alfred Dunhill Championship, which was played in December as part of the 2013 season.

During the season, the BMW Masters in China was added to the schedule, the Czech Open was cancelled, and three tournaments in Spain were also cancelled: the Iberdrola Open, the Madrid Masters, and the Andalucía Masters.

== Schedule ==
The following table lists official events during the 2012 season.

| Date | Tournament | Host country | Purse | Winner (Note: The number in brackets after each winner's name is the number of European Tour events they had won up to and including that tournament. This information is only shown for European Tour members and are inclusive of the three United States-based major championships which were included on the schedule for the first time in 1998, with earlier editions having retrospectively been recognised as official tour wins.) | OWGR points | Other tours (Note: AFR − Sunshine Tour; ANZ − PGA Tour of Australasia; ASA − Asian Tour; CHA − Challenge Tour; KOR − Korean Tour; ONE − OneAsia Tour.) | Notes |
|---|---|---|---|---|---|---|---|
| 8 Jan | Africa Open | South Africa | €1,000,000 | (South Africa) Louis Oosthuizen (4) | 20 | AFR | |
| 15 Jan | Joburg Open | South Africa | €1,300,000 | (South Africa) Branden Grace (1) | 22 | AFR | |
| 22 Jan | Volvo Golf Champions | South Africa | €2,000,000 | (South Africa) Branden Grace (2) | 32 | | Limited-field event |
| 29 Jan | Abu Dhabi HSBC Golf Championship | UAE | US$2,700,000 | (England) Robert Rock (2) | 58 | | |
| 5 Feb | Commercialbank Qatar Masters | Qatar | US$2,500,000 | (Scotland) Paul Lawrie (7) | 48 | | |
| 12 Feb | Omega Dubai Desert Classic | UAE | US$2,500,000 | (Spain) Rafa Cabrera-Bello (2) | 48 | | |
| 19 Feb | Avantha Masters | India | €1,800,000 | (South Africa) Jbe' Kruger (1) | 20 | ASA | |
| 26 Feb | WGC-Accenture Match Play Championship | United States | US$8,500,000 | (United States) Hunter Mahan (n/a) | 76 | | World Golf Championship |
| 11 Mar | WGC-Cadillac Championship | United States | US$8,500,000 | (England) Justin Rose (5) | 78 | | World Golf Championship |
| 18 Mar | Open de Andalucía Costa del Sol | Spain | €1,000,000 | (France) Julien Quesne (1) | 24 | | |
| 25 Mar | Trophée Hassan II | Morocco | €1,500,000 | (Northern Ireland) Michael Hoey (4) | 24 | | |
| 1 Apr | Sicilian Open | Italy | €1,000,000 | (Denmark) Thorbjørn Olesen (1) | 24 | | |
| 8 Apr | Masters Tournament | United States | US$8,000,000 | (United States) Bubba Watson (n/a) | 100 | | Major championship |
| 15 Apr | Maybank Malaysian Open | Malaysia | US$2,500,000 | (South Africa) Louis Oosthuizen (5) | 36 | ASA | |
| 22 Apr | Volvo China Open | China | CN¥20,000,000 | (South Africa) Branden Grace (3) | 32 | ONE | |
| 29 Apr | Ballantine's Championship | South Korea | €2,205,000 | (Austria) Bernd Wiesberger (1) | 32 | ASA, KOR | |
| 6 May | Reale Seguros Open de España | Spain | €2,000,000 | (Italy) Francesco Molinari (3) | 30 | | |
| ~~13 May~~ | Iberdrola Open | Spain | – | Cancelled | – | | |
| 13 May | Madeira Islands Open - Portugal | Portugal | €675,000 | (Portugal) Ricardo Santos (1) | 18 | CHA | |
| 20 May | Volvo World Match Play Championship | Spain | €2,750,000 | (Belgium) Nicolas Colsaerts (2) | 34 | | Limited-field event |
| 27 May | BMW PGA Championship | England | €4,500,000 | (England) Luke Donald (7) | 64 | | Flagship event |
| 3 Jun | ISPS Handa Wales Open | Wales | £1,800,000 | (Thailand) Thongchai Jaidee (5) | 28 | | |
| 9 Jun | Nordea Masters | Sweden | €1,500,000 | (England) Lee Westwood (22) | 26 | | |
| 17 Jun | Saint-Omer Open | France | €500,000 | (South Africa) Darren Fichardt (3) | 18 | CHA | |
| 17 Jun | U.S. Open | United States | US$8,000,000 | (United States) Webb Simpson (n/a) | 100 | | Major championship |
| 24 Jun | BMW International Open | Germany | €2,000,000 | (England) Danny Willett (1) | 30 | | |
| 1 Jul | Irish Open | Northern Ireland | €2,000,000 | (Wales) Jamie Donaldson (1) | 38 | | |
| 8 Jul | Alstom Open de France | France | €3,000,000 | (Germany) Marcel Siem (2) | 46 | | |
| 15 Jul | Aberdeen Asset Management Scottish Open | Scotland | £2,500,000 | (India) Jeev Milkha Singh (4) | 48 | | |
| 22 Jul | The Open Championship | England | £5,000,000 | (South Africa) Ernie Els (27) | 100 | | Major championship |
| 28 Jul | Lyoness Open | Austria | €1,000,000 | (Austria) Bernd Wiesberger (2) | 24 | | |
| 5 Aug | WGC-Bridgestone Invitational | United States | US$8,500,000 | (United States) Keegan Bradley (n/a) | 76 | | World Golf Championship |
| 12 Aug | PGA Championship | United States | US$8,000,000 | (Northern Ireland) Rory McIlroy (4) | 100 | | Major championship |
| ~~19 Aug~~ | Czech Open | Czech Republic | – | Cancelled | – | | |
| 26 Aug | Johnnie Walker Championship at Gleneagles | Scotland | £1,400,000 | (Scotland) Paul Lawrie (8) | 30 | | |
| 2 Sep | Omega European Masters | Switzerland | €2,100,000 | (Scotland) Richie Ramsay (2) | 32 | ASA | |
| 9 Sep | KLM Open | Netherlands | €1,800,000 | (Sweden) Peter Hanson (5) | 30 | | |
| 16 Sep | BMW Italian Open | Italy | €1,500,000 | (Spain) Gonzalo Fernández-Castaño (6) | 28 | | |
| ~~23 Sep~~ | Madrid Masters | Spain | – | Cancelled | – | | |
| 7 Oct | Alfred Dunhill Links Championship | Scotland | US$5,000,000 | (South Africa) Branden Grace (4) | 46 | | Pro-Am |
| 14 Oct | Portugal Masters | Portugal | €2,200,000 | (Republic of Ireland) Shane Lowry (2) | 34 | | |
| ~~21 Oct~~ | Andalucía Masters | Spain | – | Cancelled | – | | |
| 21 Oct | ISPS Handa Perth International | Australia | US$2,000,000 | (United States) Bo Van Pelt (n/a) | 22 | ANZ | New tournament |
| 28 Oct | BMW Masters | China | US$7,000,000 | (Sweden) Peter Hanson (6) | 56 | | New to European Tour; Limited-field event |
| 4 Nov | WGC-HSBC Champions | China | US$7,000,000 | (England) Ian Poulter (12) | 64 | | World Golf Championship |
| 11 Nov | Barclays Singapore Open | Singapore | US$6,000,000 | (Italy) Matteo Manassero (3) | 48 | ASA | |
| 18 Nov | UBS Hong Kong Open | Hong Kong | US$2,750,000 | (Spain) Miguel Ángel Jiménez (19) | 32 | ASA | |
| 18 Nov | SA Open Championship | South Africa | €1,000,000 | (Sweden) Henrik Stenson (7) | 32 | AFR (Note: Sunshine Tour flagship event) | |
| 25 Nov | DP World Tour Championship, Dubai | UAE | US$8,000,000 | (Northern Ireland) Rory McIlroy (5) | 58 | | Tour Championship |

=== Unofficial events ===
The following events were sanctioned by the European Tour, but did not carry official money, nor were wins official.

| Date | Tournament | Host country | Purse | Winners | OWGR points | Notes |
|---|---|---|---|---|---|---|
| 30 Sep | Ryder Cup | United States | n/a | Team Europe | n/a | Team event |

== Location of tournaments ==
Location of official tournaments of the 2012 European Tour in Europe.
Major Championship
Flagship event
Regular event
Location of official tournaments of the 2012 European Tour outside Europe.
Major Championship
World Golf Championship
Tour Championship
Regular event

South Africa
United Arab Emirates

== Race to Dubai ==
The Race to Dubai was based on prize money won during the season, calculated in Euros.

| Pos. | Player | Majors | | | | WGCs | | | | Principal events | | Top 10s in other ET events | | | | | | | Tmts | Money | | |
| Pos. | Player | Mas | USO | Opn | PGA | WGC MP | WGC Cad | WGC Inv | WGC Cha | BMW PGA | DPW TC | 1 | 2 | 3 | 4 | 5 | 6 | 7 | Tmts | Reg. (€) | Bon. ($) | Total (€) |
|---|---|---|---|---|---|---|---|---|---|---|---|---|---|---|---|---|---|---|---|---|---|---|
| 1 | (Northern Ireland) McIlroy | T40 | CUT | T60 | 1st | 2nd | 3rd | T5 | • | CUT | 1st | 2nd | T5 | T10 | 2nd | 3rd | | | 15 | 4,738,027 | 1,000,000 | 5,519,118 |
| 2 | (England) Rose | T8 | T21 | CUT | T3 | T33 | 1st | T5 | T24 | T2 | 2nd | T9 | T9 | T6 | | | | | 13 | 3,260,635 | 650,000 | 3,768,345 |
| 3 | (South Africa) Oosthuizen | 2nd | CUT | T19 | T21 | T17 | T60 | 4th | T6 | • | 5th | 1st | T7 | 1st | T6 | | | | 16 | 2,796,819 | 500,000 | 3,187,364 |
| 4 | (Sweden) Hanson | T3 | CUT | T23 | T7 | T5 | T4 | T63 | T24 | CUT | T16 | T2 | T3 | 1st | 1st | | | | 21 | 2,730,006 | 375,000 | 3,022,916 |
| 5 | (England) Poulter | 7th | T41 | T9 | T3 | T33 | T60 | T29 | 1st | T10 | T26 | T9 | T4 | 4th | | | | | 15 | 2,327,402 | 325,000 | 2,581,257 |
| 6 | (South Africa) Grace | • | T51 | T77 | CUT | • | T35 | T36 | T62 | 5th | 6th | 1st | 1st | 1st | 1st | | | | 26 | 2,287,701 | 275,000 | 2,502,501 |
| 7 | (England) Donald | T32 | CUT | T5 | T32 | T33 | T6 | T8 | T18 | 1st | T3 | 3rd | | | | | | | 13 | 2,197,794 | 225,000 | 2,373,540 |
| 8 | (Italy) F. Molinari | T19 | T29 | T39 | T54 | T17 | T13 | T40 | T39 | T7 | T34 | T8 | T6 | 1st | 2nd | 2nd | T6 | T5 | 25 | 2,078,538 | 175,000 | 2,215,229 |
| 9 | (Northern Ireland) McDowell | T12 | T2 | T5 | T11 | T33 | T13 | T24 | T42 | CUT | T52 | T3 | 2nd | | | | | | 16 | 1,847,420 | 125,000 | 1,945,056 |
| 10 | (Scotland) Lawrie | T24 | • | T34 | T48 | T9 | T60 | T50 | T36 | T2 | T48 | T10 | T8 | 1st | T3 | 1st | T6 | T10 | 25 | 1,832,272 | 100,000 | 1,910,381 |

Win
Top 10
Made cut
Missed cut
• Did not play

== Awards ==
| Award | Winner | Ref. |
|---|---|---|
| Golfer of the Year | (Northern Ireland) Rory McIlroy | |
| Players' Player of the Year | (Northern Ireland) Rory McIlroy | |
| Sir Henry Cotton Rookie of the Year | (Portugal) Ricardo Santos | |

== See also ==
- 2012 in golf
- 2012 European Senior Tour
