= 2012 Volvo World Match Play Championship =

Golf tournament

Tournament information
- Dates: 17–20 May
- Location: Andalusia, Spain
- Course: Finca Cortesín Golf Club
- Tour: European Tour
- Format: Match play – 18 holes

Statistics
- Par: 72
- Length: 7,290 yards (6,670 m)
- Field: 24 players
- Prize fund: €2,750,000
- Winner's share: €700,000

Champion
- (Belgium) Nicolas Colsaerts
- def. Graeme McDowell 1 up

The 2012 Volvo World Match Play Championship was the 47th Volvo World Match Play Championship played. It was held 17–20 May, with the champion receiving €700,000. The format was 24 players split into eight pools of three, with the top two in each pool progressing to the knock-out stage. It was an official money event on the European Tour.

== Course ==
	1	2	3	4	5	6	7	8	9	Out	10	11	12	13	14	15	16	17	18	In	Total
Yards	471	215	541	334	575	195	494	574	352	3,751	188	627	224	413	353	525	464	177	568	3,539	7,290
Par	4	3	5	4	5	3	4	5	4	37	3	5	3	4	4	4	4	3	5	35	72

== Format ==
The 24 players were split into eight pools of three, with the top two in each pool seeded by their Official World Golf Ranking and the remaining eight randomly assigned to a pool. Within each pool, every player played each other in a round-robin format over 18-hole matches. Points were awarded based upon win (2), tie (1) or loss (0). The two leading players from each pool advanced to the knock-out stage. In case of ties, sudden-death playoffs were used to determine rankings.

== Participants ==
Seed	Player	Rank
1	(Germany) Martin Kaymer	9
2	(England) Justin Rose	12
3	(South Africa) Charl Schwartzel	15
4	(Northern Ireland) Graeme McDowell	20
5	(Spain) Sergio García	23
6	(Sweden) Peter Hanson	24
7	(United States) Brandt Snedeker	26
8	(England) Ian Poulter	28
9	(Australia) John Senden	35
10	(Denmark) Thomas Bjørn	37
11	(Scotland) Paul Lawrie	41
12	(Spain) Álvaro Quirós	42
13	(Sweden) Robert Karlsson	46
14	(Belgium) Nicolas Colsaerts	51
15	(England) Robert Rock	59
16	(Spain) Rafa Cabrera-Bello	61
	(South Africa) Branden Grace	65
	(South Africa) Retief Goosen	66
	(Northern Ireland) Darren Clarke	70
	(South Africa) Jbe' Kruger	119
	(Colombia) Camilo Villegas	126
	(Japan) Tetsuji Hiratsuka	133
	(England) Tom Lewis	175
	(England) Richard Finch	218

== Pool play ==
Pool Ballesteros
Winner	Score	Loser
Rafa Cabrera-Bello	3 & 2	Martin Kaymer
Rafa Cabrera-Bello	4 & 2	Richard Finch
Richard Finch	1 up	Martin Kaymer

- 1st – Cabrera-Bello
- 2nd – Finch
- 3rd – Kaymer

Pool Gabrielsson
Winner	Score	Loser
Justin Rose	7 & 6	Robert Rock
Robert Rock	2 up	Darren Clarke
Justin Rose	6 & 4	Darren Clarke

- 1st – Rose
- 2nd – Rock
- 3rd – Clarke

Pool Palmer
Winner	Score	Loser
Charl Schwartzel	Halved	Nicolas Colsaerts
Retief Goosen	1 up	Nicolas Colsaerts
Retief Goosen	4 & 3	Charl Schwartzel

- 1st – Goosen
- 2nd – Colsaerts (Colsaerts wins at the first extra hole against Schwartzel.)
- 3rd – Schwartzel

Pool Larson
Winner	Score	Loser
Graeme McDowell	1 up	Robert Karlsson
Robert Karlsson	Halved	Jbe' Kruger
Graeme McDowell	4 & 3	Jbe' Kruger

- 1st – McDowell
- 2nd – Karlsson (Karlsson wins at the first extra hole against Kruger.)
- 3rd – Kruger

Pool Woosnam
Winner	Score	Loser
Sergio García	2 & 1	Álvaro Quirós
Álvaro Quirós	5 & 4	Tetsuji Hiratsuka
Sergio García	4 & 2	Tetsuji Hiratsuka

- 1st – García
- 2nd – Quirós
- 3rd – Hiratsuka

Pool Norman
Winner	Score	Loser
Paul Lawrie	2 & 1	Peter Hanson
Paul Lawrie	Halved	Camilo Villegas
Camilo Villegas	6 & 4	Peter Hanson

- 1st – Lawrie (Lawrie wins at the first extra hole against Villegas.)
- 2nd – Villegas
- 3rd – Hanson

Pool McCormack
Winner	Score	Loser
Brandt Snedeker	5 & 4	Thomas Bjørn
Thomas Bjørn	2 & 1	Branden Grace
Branden Grace	4 & 3	Brandt Snedeker

- 1st – Snedeker (Snedeker wins at the first extra hole against Bjørn and Grace.)
- 2nd – Bjørn (Bjørn wins at the second extra hole against Grace.)
- 3rd – Grace

Pool Player
Winner	Score	Loser
Ian Poulter	3 & 2	John Senden
Tom Lewis	1 up	John Senden
Ian Poulter	4 & 3	Tom Lewis

- 1st – Poulter
- 2nd – Lewis
- 3rd – Senden

== Playoffs ==
Round of 16; 19 May, morning
(Spain) Sergio García	4&3
(England) Tom Lewis
(Northern Ireland) Graeme McDowell	3&2
(England) Richard Finch
(Scotland) Paul Lawrie	5&4
(Denmark) Thomas Bjørn
(South Africa) Retief Goosen	3&2
(England) Robert Rock
(United States) Brandt Snedeker	3&2
(Colombia) Camilo Villegas
(England) Justin Rose
(Belgium) Nicolas Colsaerts	4&3
(England) Ian Poulter
(Spain) Álvaro Quirós	4&3
(Spain) Rafa Cabrera-Bello	1 up
(Sweden) Robert Karlsson

Quarter-finals; 19 May, afternoon
(Spain) Sergio García
(Northern Ireland) Graeme McDowell	19 h
(Scotland) Paul Lawrie	6&5
(South Africa) Retief Goosen
(United States) Brandt Snedeker
(Belgium) Nicolas Colsaerts	4&3
(Spain) Álvaro Quirós
(Spain) Rafa Cabrera-Bello	3&1

Semi-finals; 20 May, morning
(Northern Ireland) Graeme McDowell	20 h
(Scotland) Paul Lawrie
(Belgium) Nicolas Colsaerts	2 up
(Spain) Rafa Cabrera-Bello

Final; 20 May, afternoon
(Northern Ireland) Graeme McDowell
(Belgium) Nicolas Colsaerts	1 up

== Prize money breakdown ==
Place	Actual prize fund (€)	Race to Dubai fund (€)
Champion	700,000	458,333
Runner-up	360,000	305,555
Semi-finals losers x 2	180,000	154,825
Quarter-finals losers x 4	92,500	91,025
Round of 16 losers x 8	70,000	47,506
Third place in pool x 8	50,000	32,794
Total	€2,750,000	2,080,038
