= 2011 Vivendi Seve Trophy =

2011 Seve Trophy
- Dates: 15–18 September
- Venue: Golf de Saint-Nom-la-Bretèche
- Location: Paris, France
- Captains: Jean van de Velde (Europe); Paul McGinley (GB&I)
(Europe)	12½	15½	(United Kingdom) (Republic of Ireland)
- Great Britain and Ireland wins the Seve Trophy

The 2011 Vivendi Seve Trophy, formerly known as the Seve Trophy, was played 15–18 September at Golf de Saint-Nom-la-Bretèche in France. The team captain for Great Britain and Ireland was Paul McGinley, with the captain for Continental Europe being Jean van de Velde. Great Britain and Ireland won the Trophy for the sixth consecutive time.

== Format ==
The teams competed over four days with five fourball matches on both Thursday and Friday, four greensomes matches on Saturday morning, four foursomes matches on Saturday afternoon and ten singles matches on Sunday. It means a total of 28 points are available with 14½ points required for victory. If the score finished at 14–14, then two players from each team to play using the greensomes format to find the winner.

The prize money remained the same as for the 2009 event. Each member of the winner team received €65,000, the losing team €55,000 each, giving a total prize fund of €1,150,000.

== Teams ==
The teams were made up of five leading players from the Official World Golf Rankings as of 5 September 2011 and five leading players (not otherwise qualified) from the Race to Dubai at the conclusion of the Omega European Masters (5 September 2011). There were a number of players (listed after each table below) who qualified for the trophy, but pulled out.

Raphaël Jacquelin was a late replacement for Álvaro Quirós who withdrew from the Continental Europe team with a wrist injury. Quirós had qualified as one of the leading 5 players in the World Rankings (world ranked 33). After his withdrawal his place amongst the World Rankings qualifiers was taken by Miguel Ángel Jiménez who had previously qualified through the Race to Dubai list. Jiménez's place in the Race to Dubai list was taken by Jacquelin.

Team GB&I
Name	Country	Qualification	World Ranking	Race to Dubai
Paul McGinley	Ireland	Non-playing captain	—	—
Lee Westwood	England	World Rankings	2	5
Ian Poulter	England	World Rankings	18	15
Darren Clarke	Northern Ireland	World Rankings	38	8
Simon Dyson	England	World Rankings	55	10
Ross Fisher	England	World Rankings	72	43
Mark Foster	England	Race to Dubai	125	22
Robert Rock	England	Race to Dubai	114	30
Jamie Donaldson	Wales	Race to Dubai	92	33
David Horsey	England	Race to Dubai	106	37
Scott Jamieson	Scotland	Race to Dubai	164	38

The following players qualified but did not play: Luke Donald, Rory McIlroy, Graeme McDowell, Paul Casey, Justin Rose. Donald and Rose were playing in the BMW Championship.

Team Continental Europe
Name	Country	Qualification	World Ranking	Race to Dubai
Jean van de Velde	France	Non-playing captain	—	—
Francesco Molinari	Italy	World Rankings	24	18
Anders Hansen	Denmark	World Rankings	26	6
Thomas Bjørn	Denmark	World Rankings	28	7
Matteo Manassero	Italy	World Rankings	31	19
Miguel Ángel Jiménez	Spain	World Rankings	36	12
Alex Norén	Sweden	Race to Dubai	68	9
Pablo Larrazábal	Spain	Race to Dubai	91	11
Nicolas Colsaerts	Belgium	Race to Dubai	79	14
Peter Hanson	Sweden	Race to Dubai	51	21
Raphaël Jacquelin	France	Race to Dubai	84	23

Apart from Quirós, the following players qualified but did not play: Martin Kaymer, Robert Karlsson, Sergio García. Karlsson and García were playing in the BMW Championship.

== Day one ==
Thursday, 15 September 2011

=== Fourball ===
	Results
Donaldson/Dyson	(United Kingdom) (Republic of Ireland) 2 & 1	Jiménez/Larrazábal
Fisher/Jamieson	(United Kingdom) (Republic of Ireland) 6 & 4	Hanson/Jacquelin
Foster/Westwood	(Europe) 1 up	Hansen/Molinari
Clarke/Horsey	(United Kingdom) (Republic of Ireland) 1 up	Colsaerts/Manassero
Poulter/Rock	(United Kingdom) (Republic of Ireland) 5 & 3	Bjørn/Norén
4	Session	1
4	Overall	1

== Day two ==
Friday, 16 September 2011

=== Fourball ===
	Results
Donaldson/Dyson	halved	Bjørn/Jacquelin
Poulter/Rock	(Europe) 5 & 3	Hanson/Norén
Fisher/Jamieson	(Europe) 2 up	Colsaerts/Manassero
Foster/Westwood	(United Kingdom) (Republic of Ireland) 5 & 3	Hansen/Molinari
Clarke/Horsey	(Europe) 3 & 2	Jiménez/Larrazábal
1½	Session	3½
5½	Overall	4½

== Day three ==
Saturday, 17 September 2011

=== Morning greensomes ===
	Results
Donaldson/Dyson	(United Kingdom) (Republic of Ireland) 2 & 1	Colsaerts/Manassero
Clarke/Horsey	halved	Hanson/Norén
Fisher/Poulter	(United Kingdom) (Republic of Ireland) 2 & 1	Bjørn/Jacquelin
Jamieson/Westwood	(United Kingdom) (Republic of Ireland) 4 & 3	Jiménez/Larrazábal
3½	Session	½
9	Overall	5

=== Afternoon foursomes ===
	Results
Donaldson/Rock	halved	Manassero/Molinari
Fisher/Foster	(Europe) 3 & 2	Bjørn/Hansen
Dyson/Poulter	(United Kingdom) (Republic of Ireland) 3 & 1	Larrazábal/Norén
Horsey/Westwood	(United Kingdom) (Republic of Ireland) 4 & 3	Colsaerts/Jacquelin
2½	Session	1½
11½	Overall	6½

== Day four ==
Sunday, 18 September 2011

=== Singles ===
	Results
Lee Westwood	(Europe) 2 & 1	Thomas Bjørn
Simon Dyson	(Europe) 1 up	Anders Hansen
Jamie Donaldson	(Europe) 4 & 3	Francesco Molinari
Robert Rock	(Europe) 4 & 3	Alex Norén
Darren Clarke	(Europe) 4 & 2	Miguel Ángel Jiménez
David Horsey	halved	Nicolas Colsaerts
Scott Jamieson	(United Kingdom) (Republic of Ireland) 1 up	Pablo Larrazábal
Ian Poulter	(United Kingdom) (Republic of Ireland) 1 up	Matteo Manassero
Mark Foster	(United Kingdom) (Republic of Ireland) 1 up	Raphaël Jacquelin
Ross Fisher	halved	Peter Hanson
4	Session	6
15½	Overall	12½
