= Nicolas Colsaerts =

Belgian professional golfer (born 1982)

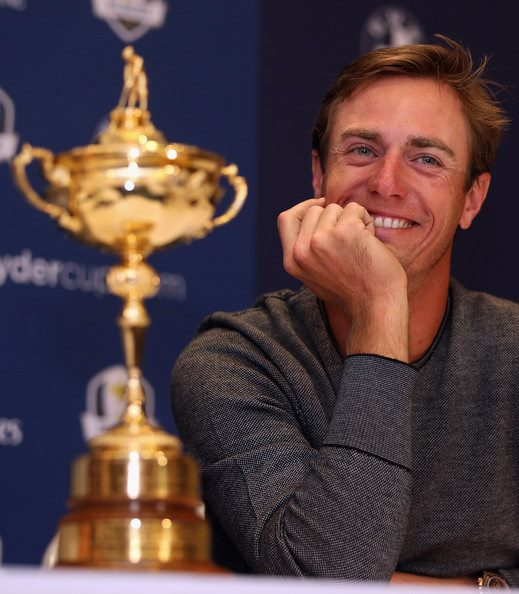
- Colsaerts with the Ryder Cup

Personal information
- Full name: Nicolas Colsaerts
- Nickname: The Belgian Bomber
- Nationality: Belgium
- Born: 14 November 1982 (age 43) Schaerbeek, Belgium
- Height: 1.88 m (6 ft 2 in)
- Weight: 78 kg (172 lb; 12.3 st)
- Spouse: Rachel
- Children: 2

Career
- Sport: Golf
- Turned professional: 2000
- Former tours: European Tour; PGA Tour
- Professional wins: 10
- Highest ranking: 32 (20 May 2012)

Number of wins by tour
- European Tour: 3
- Challenge Tour: 2
- Other: 5

Best results in major championships
- Masters Tournament: CUT: 2013
- PGA Championship: CUT: 2012, 2013, 2016, 2017
- U.S. Open: T10: 2013
- The Open Championship: T7: 2012

Nicolas Colsaerts (born 14 November 1982) is a Belgian professional golfer previously playing on the European Tour and the PGA Tour.

== Early life ==
Colsaerts, also known as "The Belgian Bomber", was born in Schaerbeek, Belgium. Coming from a sporting family (his great-grandfather represented Belgium at basketball and water polo at the 1920 Olympic Games), he started playing golf at 6 years old in Brussels, Belgium. He had a very successful junior and amateur career; he was selected twice for the Junior Ryder Cup (in 1997 and 1999), and represented Belgium at the 1998 and 2000 Eisenhower Trophy.

He turned professional in 2000, the day of his 18th birthday, with a +5 handicap.

Colsaerts speaks five languages: French, English, Dutch, Spanish and Italian.

== Professional career ==
Three days after turning professional Colsaerts entered 2000 Qualifying School where he gained his European Tour card.

Colsaerts first season on the European Tour was unsuccessful and having finished 172nd on the Order of Merit Colsaerts lost his European Tour card. He spent the 2002 season playing on the Challenge Tour and despite a winless season he finished 10th of the Challenge Tour Order of Merit to regain his European Tour card for 2003. Colsaerts continued to play on the European Tour throughout in next four seasons.

Colsaerts led the Nissan Irish Open at the halfway stage in 2006, but fell away over the weekend and finished in a tie for 53rd place. Similarly, he led the EnterCard Scandinavian Masters after the third round but finished tied for 24th. Following a poor season in 2007 when he finished 201st on the Order of Merit, Colsaerts again lost his European Tour card and returned to the Challenge Tour for the 2008 and 2009 seasons.

Colsaerts nearly won the 2009 Challenge of Ireland after a final round 68, but lost at the third hole of a sudden-death playoff to English golfer Robert Coles. However, he eventually captured his maiden victory on the Challenge Tour a few weeks later at the SK Golf Challenge and added the Dutch Futures later in October. In 2010, he had a best finish of third at the BMW Italian Open, and retained his tour card for 2011 after finishing 67th on the Race to Dubai rankings.

In 2011 he won his first European Tour title at the Volvo China Open. He then reached the semi-finals of the 2011 Volvo World Match Play Championship in Spain, losing to eventual winner Ian Poulter after a playoff hole in the semi-finals. These results placed him high enough on the year's ranking to get him a spot for the 2011 Open Championship, and two days later he won the European qualifying tournament for the 2011 U.S. Open at Walton Heath Golf Club. He finished the season ranked 20th in the Race to Dubai to secure invitations to at least two majors in 2012.

In May 2012, he won his biggest career title at the Volvo World Match Play Championship. He beat Graeme McDowell, 1 up, in the final and was never behind in the match at any point. On his way to the title he also beat Justin Rose 4 and 3, Brandt Snedeker 4 and 3, and Paul Lawrie at the 20th hole in the semi-finals, after beginning four down after four holes. Prior to all of this, he had only just advanced from the group stage after defeating Charl Schwartzel at the first playoff hole. Colsaerts entered the top 50 in the world after his win took him to world number 32.

Colsaerts played in the 2012 U.S. Open at the Olympic Club and made the cut for the first time in a major championship, going on to finish tied 27th. For a brief period during the third round Colsaerts was tied for the lead and started the final round just three strokes back of the leaders. However he fell away with a final round of 76. On 27 August 2012, he was selected by European captain José María Olazábal as a wildcard for the 2012 Ryder Cup team, becoming the first Belgian to play in the event. At the event, he was paired with Lee Westwood in the Friday afternoon fourball match against the American pairing of Tiger Woods and Steve Stricker. He won that match almost entirely by himself, sinking multiple long putts throughout, thereby collecting a point for Europe. On Saturday he was selected for two matches but his pairing lost both. He ultimately lost his Sunday singles match as well, though team Europe did go on to win the Ryder Cup by a half point. He finished the season ranked 11th on the Race to Dubai. In October, Colsaerts joined the PGA Tour, accepting Special Temporary Member status for the final three events of the season. Colsaerts made $677,011 as a non-member, finishing almost $30,000 ahead of Kevin Chappell, the golfer who earned the 125th and final PGA Tour card for 2013. The amount earned Colsaerts full membership into the PGA Tour for 2013.

In 2013, Colsaerts played on both the European and PGA Tour; in the US, he finished tenth at the U.S. Open, 8th at the Zurich Classic of New Orleans and reached round of 16 of the WGC-Accenture Match Play Championship. With a final 128th place in the FedEx Cup he missed the end of season playoffs, but was able to retain his membership thanks to his 114th place in the money list. He collected five top-10 finishes in the European Tour, with a fifth place at the Italian Open as best result.

In 2014 he finished second at the Portugal Masters and Malaysian Open, fourth at the Wales Open and sixth at the BMW Masters. His season was less successful in the US, where he was cut 7 times in 12 events and lost his tour membership.

During the 2015 season, Colsaerts finished seventh the Nordea Masters, ninth at the Paul Lawrie Match Play and 13th at the Qatar Masters.

In August 2016, Colsaerts represented Belgium at the 2016 Summer Olympics in the Individual Stroke Play competition, finishing tied for the 30th place.

In May 2017, he tied for third place in the BMW PGA Championship at Wentworth.

In October 2019, Colsaerts won the Open de France at Le Golf National outside of Paris, France.

In October 2024, at the Alfred Dunhill Links Championship, he finished second to Tyrrell Hatton. Hatton birdied the final hole to win by one stroke over Colsaerts.

== Broadcast career ==
Colsaerts announced his retirement after 24 years on tour at the end of the 2025 season, and joined LIV Golf as an on-course reporter in 2026.

== Amateur wins ==
- 2000 Belgian Stroke Play Championship, Belgian Match Play Championship, French International Boys Championship

== Professional wins (10) ==
=== European Tour wins (3) ===
| No. | Date | Tournament | Winning score | Margin of victory | Runner(s)-up |
|---|---|---|---|---|---|
| 1 | 24 Apr 2011 | Volvo China Open^{1} | −24 (65-67-66-66=264) | 4 strokes | (Denmark) Søren Kjeldsen, (Republic of Ireland) Peter Lawrie, (New Zealand) Danny Lee, (Spain) Pablo Martín |
| 2 | 20 May 2012 | Volvo World Match Play Championship | 1 up | | (Northern Ireland) Graeme McDowell |
| 3 | 20 Oct 2019 | Amundi Open de France | −12 (67-66-67-72=272) | 1 stroke | (Denmark) Joachim B. Hansen |

^{1}Co-sanctioned by the OneAsia Tour

=== Challenge Tour wins (2) ===
| No. | Date | Tournament | Winning score | Margin of victory | Runners-up |
|---|---|---|---|---|---|
| 1 | 9 Aug 2009 | SK Golf Challenge | −11 (70-71-70-66=277) | Playoff | (Wales) Rhys Davies, (France) Julien Guerrier |
| 2 | 13 Sep 2009 | Dutch Futures | −17 (69-66-67-69=271) | 4 strokes | (Scotland) Andrew McArthur, (France) Julien Quesne |

Challenge Tour playoff record (1–2)

| No. | Year | Tournament | Opponent(s) | Result |
|---|---|---|---|---|
| 1 | 2000 | DEXIA-BIL Luxembourg Open (as an amateur) | (Denmark) Nils Roerbaek-Petersen, (Sweden) Henrik Stenson | Stenson won with birdie on second extra hole |
| 2 | 2009 | Challenge of Ireland | (England) Robert Coles | Lost to birdie on third extra hole |
| 3 | 2009 | SK Golf Challenge | (Wales) Rhys Davies, (France) Julien Guerrier | Won with birdie on second extra hole |

=== Alps Tour wins (1) ===
| No. | Date | Tournament | Winning score | Margin of victory | Runner-up |
|---|---|---|---|---|---|
| 1 | 15 May 2005 | Open de Bordeaux | −23 (65-66-65-69=265) | 6 strokes | (France) Pierre Sallat |

=== French Tour wins (1) ===
| No. | Date | Tournament | Winning score | Margin of victory | Runners-up |
|---|---|---|---|---|---|
| 1 | 4 Dec 2010 | Mauritius Golf Masters | −9 (67-73-67=207) | 4 strokes | (South Africa) Darren Fichardt, (South Africa) Hennie Otto |

=== Other wins (3) ===
- 2000 World Travel Open (PGA of Belgium) (as an amateur)
- 2002 Belgian Match Play Championship
- 2003 Omnium of Belgium

== Results in major championships ==
| Tournament | 2004 | 2005 | 2006 | 2007 | 2008 | 2009 |
|---|---|---|---|---|---|---|
| Masters Tournament | | | | | | |
| U.S. Open | | | | | | |
| The Open Championship | CUT | | | | | |
| PGA Championship | | | | | | |

| Tournament | 2010 | 2011 | 2012 | 2013 | 2014 | 2015 | 2016 | 2017 | 2018 |
|---|---|---|---|---|---|---|---|---|---|
| Masters Tournament | | | | CUT | | | | | |
| U.S. Open | | CUT | T27 | T10 | CUT | | | | |
| The Open Championship | | | T7 | CUT | | | T46 | | CUT |
| PGA Championship | | | CUT | CUT | | | CUT | CUT | |

Top 10
Did not play

CUT = missed the half-way cut
"T" indicates a tie for a place

=== Summary ===
| Tournament | Wins | 2nd | 3rd | Top-5 | Top-10 | Top-25 | Events | Cuts made |
|---|---|---|---|---|---|---|---|---|
| Masters Tournament | 0 | 0 | 0 | 0 | 0 | 0 | 1 | 0 |
| U.S. Open | 0 | 0 | 0 | 0 | 1 | 1 | 4 | 2 |
| The Open Championship | 0 | 0 | 0 | 0 | 1 | 1 | 5 | 2 |
| PGA Championship | 0 | 0 | 0 | 0 | 0 | 0 | 4 | 0 |
| Totals | 0 | 0 | 0 | 0 | 2 | 2 | 14 | 4 |

- Most consecutive cuts made – 2 (2012 U.S. Open – 2012 Open Championship)
- Longest streak of top-10s – 1 (twice)

== Results in World Golf Championships ==
| Tournament | 2011 | 2012 | 2013 |
|---|---|---|---|
| Match Play | | R64 | R16 |
| Championship | | T35 | T18 |
| Invitational | | T45 | T57 |
| Champions | T20 | T54 | |

Top 10
Did not play

QF, R16, R32, R64 = Round in which player lost in match play
"T" = Tied

== Team appearances ==
Amateur

- European Boys' Team Championship (representing Belgium): 1997, 1999
- Junior Ryder Cup (representing Europe): 1997, 1999 (winners)
- Jacques Léglise Trophy (representing the Continent of Europe): 1998, 1999, 2000
- Eisenhower Trophy (representing Belgium): 1998, 2000
- European Youths' Team Championship (representing Belgium): 1998, 2000
- Bonallack Trophy (representing Europe): 2000 (winners)

Professional

- Seve Trophy (representing Continental Europe): 2011, 2013 (winners)
- World Cup (representing Belgium): 2011, 2013, 2016
- Royal Trophy (representing Europe): 2012, 2013 (winners)
- Ryder Cup (representing Europe): 2012 (winners)

== See also ==
- 2009 Challenge Tour graduates
