= WGC-HSBC Champions =

Golf tournament held in Shanghai, China

Coordinates: 31.109°N 121.216°E

Tournament information
- Location: Shanghai, China
- Established: 2005
- Course: Sheshan Golf Club
- Par: 72
- Length: 7,261 yards (6,639 m)
- Organized by: International Federation of PGA Tours
- Tours: PGA Tour; European Tour; Asian Tour; Sunshine Tour; PGA Tour of Australasia
- Format: Stroke play
- Prize fund: US$10,500,000
- Month played: October
- Final year: 2019

Tournament record score
- Aggregate: 264 Dustin Johnson (2013)
- To par: −24 as above

Final champion
- (Northern Ireland) Rory McIlroy
- Location in China Location in Shanghai

The WGC-HSBC Champions was a professional golf tournament held annually in China. Inaugurated in 2005, the first seven editions were played at the Sheshan Golf Club in Shanghai, then moved to the Mission Hills Golf Club in Shenzhen for a single year in 2012. It returned to the Sheshan Golf Club in 2013 and would continue to be hosted there until 2019. Starting in 2009, it was a World Golf Championship (WGC) event. Played in November, it was the fourth tournament on the WGC calendar, along with the WGC-Dell Match Play, the WGC-Mexico Championship, and the WGC-FedEx St. Jude Invitational events, all in North America. The field consisted primarily of players who had won the top-rated tournaments since the previous WGC-HSBC tournament, supplemented by other leading players in the world rankings and money lists of the major tours.

The WGC-HSBC Champions had the highest prize money in East Asia. Originally in 2005, it was US$5 million, and grew to $7 million when it obtained WGC status in 2009, $8.5 million in 2013 and in 2019, the prize money was $10.25 million. Only the CIMB Classic, CJ Cup, Zozo Championship, and BMW Masters have had similar purses in the region.

== Field ==
=== 2005–2008 ===
Originally, the event was sanctioned by four—the European, the Asian, and Sunshine Tours and the PGA Tour of Australasia—of the six constituent tours of International Federation of PGA Tours at that time. Invitations were issued to all players placed amongst the top 50 in the Official World Golf Ranking (OWGR). Also invited were players who had, during the calendar year preceding the event, captured at least one tournament title on a sanctioning tour, or had finished the preceding season amongst the top 20 in the European Tour's Race to Dubai (the Order of Merit standings through 2008) or amongst the top five in the Order of Merit standings of any of the other three sanctioning tours. Players who had finished first in the Order of Merit standings in any of three developmental tours—the Von Nida and Challenge Tours and the winter swing of the Sunshine Tour—were also invited. Finally, starting berths were also reserved for eight Chinese amateur and professional players to be selected by tournament organizers and sponsors, whether by qualifying tournament or not.

=== 2009: Elevated to WGC status ===
The event became a World Golf Championship in 2009 on the European Tour. The field consisted primarily of winners of the most important tournaments around the world since the previous WGC-HSBC Champions tournament. Each of the six member tours were allocated a certain number of tournaments from their tour (from 4 to 20), although these tournament had to meet a minimum entry requirement. Co-sanctioned tournaments were assigned to one tour only.

The tournaments were ranked using the Official World Golf Ranking strength of field ("total event ranking"). Tournaments had a minimum event ranking of 40. The ranking was based on the previous year's event ranking so the list of qualifying events could be determined in advance. New events could be included if they were expected to have an event ranking of at least 40.

Further players gained entry through their position in the current seasons Order of Merit. Six players from China were selected, while any player ranked in the world top 50 was also given an entry. If the field size was less than 78, further entries were selected from winners of additional tournaments not already considered, players ranked outside the world top 50, and the players further down the Order of Merit lists.

=== 2010s ===
From 2009 to 2012, the WGC-HSBC Champions was an unofficial money event on the PGA Tour, meaning prize money did not count toward the PGA Tour money list or Fed-Ex Cup points standings. Since 2010, victories counted as official wins for PGA Tour members, and as such, Phil Mickelson's victory in 2009 is not counted as an official win. During this time, only Ian Poulter (2012) was a PGA Tour member at the time of his win; Martin Kaymer (2011) and Francesco Molinari (2010) did not join the tour until 2013 and 2014, respectively.

=== 2013: Became an official PGA Tour event ===
In 2013, the WGC-HSBC Champions became an official PGA Tour event and a member of the FedEx Cup schedule, with the winner receiving a three-year exemption on the tour. In 2013, the purse for the WGC-HSBC Champions increased from $7 million to $8.5 million, and full FedExCup points would be given, including the 10% premium awarded by the other WGC tournaments.

The tournament was the second event of the European Tour Final Series from 2013 to 2015.

In November 2015, HSBC announced the renewal of its sponsorship for the WGC-HSBC Champions, the HSBC Women's Champions, and the Abu Dhabi HSBC Golf Championship. This came after news from earlier that year, where the bank continued to be a patron of The Open Championship.

Sheshan Golf Club in Shanghai hosted the first World Golf Championship (WGC-HSBC Champions) of the 2018–2019 season of the PGA Tour. A field of 78 players competed for the $10 million purse, $1.6 million of which went to the winner.

=== 2020s ===
In September 2020, the WGC-HSBC Champions were cancelled because of government restrictions on international sporting events due to the COVID-19 pandemic. The Champions were originally scheduled to take place at the Sheshan Golf Club from October 29 through November 1 of that year.

In December 2020, it was announced that HSBC had renewed its sponsorship of the WGC-HSBC Champions, as well as the HSBC Women's World Championship in Singapore and the CGA-HSBC China Junior Golf Programme.

The WGC-HSBC Champions were cancelled again in 2021 and 2022 due to the pandemic. As of 2023, the WGC-HSBC remained in contract with the PGA Tour, but the Champions have not been played since being cancelled.

== Qualifications ==
The qualification categories were as follows:

1. Winners of the four major championships and The Players Championship
2. Winners of the four World Golf Championships
3. Top 50 in the Official World Golf Ranking as of two weeks prior the start of the event
4. Top 30 available players from the final FedEx Cup Points List (if less than 5 players are available, players from position 31 or lower will be selected to fill in)
5. Top 30 available players from the Race to Dubai Ranking as of one week prior the start of the event
6. Top 4 available players from the Asian Tour ad hoc qualifying ranking
7. Top 2 available players from the Japan Golf Tour Order of Merit as of one week prior the start of the event
8. Top 2 available players from the final PGA Tour of Australasia Order of Merit
9. Top 2 available players from the final Sunshine Tour Order of Merit
10. Six players from China
11. Alternates

== Winners ==
World Golf Championship	2009–2012, 2016–2019
World Golf Championship and European Tour (Race to Dubai finals series)	2013–2015
European Tour (Regular)	2005–2008

#	Year	Tour(s) (Note: AFR − Sunshine Tour; ANZ − PGA Tour of Australasia; ASA − Asian Tour; EUR − European Tour; PGAT − PGA Tour.)	Winner	Score	To par	Margin of victory	Runner(s)-up	Purse (US$)	Winner's share ($)	Venue	Ref.
WGC-HSBC Champions
–	2022	EUR, PGAT	Cancelled due to the COVID-19 pandemic								
–	2021	EUR, PGAT	Cancelled due to the COVID-19 pandemic								
–	2020	EUR, PGAT	Cancelled due to the COVID-19 pandemic								
15th	2019	EUR, PGAT	(Northern Ireland) Rory McIlroy	269	−19	Playoff	(United States) Xander Schauffele	10,250,000	1,745,000	Sheshan	
14th	2018	EUR, PGAT	(United States) Xander Schauffele	274	−14	Playoff	(United States) Tony Finau	10,000,000	1,700,000	Sheshan	
13th	2017	EUR, PGAT	(England) Justin Rose	274	−14	2 strokes	(United States) Dustin Johnson (United States) Brooks Koepka (Sweden) Henrik Stenson	9,750,000	1,660,000	Sheshan	
12th	2016	EUR, PGAT	(Japan) Hideki Matsuyama	265	−23	7 strokes	(United States) Daniel Berger (Sweden) Henrik Stenson	9,500,000	1,620,000	Sheshan	
11th	2015	EUR, PGAT	(Scotland) Russell Knox	268	−20	2 strokes	(United States) Kevin Kisner	8,500,000	1,400,000	Sheshan	
10th	2014	EUR, PGAT	(United States) Bubba Watson	277	−11	Playoff	(South Africa) Tim Clark	8,500,000	1,400,000	Sheshan	
9th	2013	EUR, PGAT	(United States) Dustin Johnson	264	−24	3 strokes	(England) Ian Poulter	8,500,000	1,400,000	Sheshan	
8th	2012	EUR, PGAT (Note: Between 2010–2012, wins were only counted as official PGA Tour wins if the winner was a member of the tour. Ian Poulter fulfilled this criterion, whereas Martin Kaymer and Francesco Molinari did not.)	(England) Ian Poulter	267	−21	2 strokes	(United States) Jason Dufner (South Africa) Ernie Els (United States) Phil Mickelson (United States) Scott Piercy	7,000,000	1,200,000	Mission Hills	
7th	2011	EUR, PGAT	(Germany) Martin Kaymer	268	−20	3 strokes	(Sweden) Freddie Jacobson	7,000,000	1,200,000	Sheshan	
6th	2010	EUR, PGAT	(Italy) Francesco Molinari	269	−19	1 stroke	(England) Lee Westwood	7,000,000	1,200,000	Sheshan	
5th	2009	EUR, PGAT (Note: The 2009 event was an unofficial PGA Tour event, therefore Mickelson's win is only considered official on the European Tour.)	(United States) Phil Mickelson (2)	271	−17	1 stroke	(South Africa) Ernie Els	7,000,000	1,200,000	Sheshan	
HSBC Champions
4th	2008	AFR, (Note: Between 2005–2008 the event was sanctioned by the Asian Tour, Sunshine Tour and PGA Tour of Australasia, however it was an unofficial money event; therefore the win is considered unofficial on those tours.) ANZ, ASA, EUR	(Spain) Sergio García	274	−14	Playoff	(England) Oliver Wilson	5,000,000	833,300	Sheshan	
3rd	2007	AFR, ANZ, ASA, EUR	(United States) Phil Mickelson	278	−10	Playoff	(England) Ross Fisher (England) Lee Westwood	5,000,000	833,300	Sheshan	
2nd	2006	AFR, ANZ, ASA, EUR	(South Korea) Yang Yong-eun	274	−14	2 strokes	(United States) Tiger Woods	5,000,000	833,300	Sheshan	
1st	2005	AFR, ANZ, ASA, EUR	(England) David Howell	268	−20	3 strokes	(United States) Tiger Woods	5,000,000	833,300	Sheshan	
