= Sheshan Golf Club =

Golf club in Shanghai, China

Coordinates: 31.109°N 121.216°E

- Interactive map of Sheshan Golf Club

Club information
- Established: 2004
- Type: Private
- Total holes: 18
- Tournaments: WGC-HSBC Champions 2005–2019
- Website: Sheshan Golf Club

Sheshan Golf Club (simplified Chinese: 佘山高尔夫俱乐部; traditional Chinese: 佘山高爾夫俱樂部; pinyin: Shéshān gāo'ěrfū jùlèbù) is a private golf club in Shanghai, China. Designed by Robin Nelson and Neil Haworth (Nelson & Haworth), the 18-hole golf course has a par of 72 and spans almost 7,200 yards (6,583 meters).

The club hosted 14 of the 15 annual WGC-HSBC Champions from 2005 to 2019. Sheshan was named the second and third best golf course in China by Golf Digest in 2024 and 2022, respectively. It was also recognized as the 2020–2021 Platinum Club of Asia-Pacific and gained five-star private club status. The course is known for its challenging layout, featuring water hazards, tree-lined fairways, and elevation changes.

== Overview ==
Sheshan Golf Club, which opened in 2004, is a golf facility spanning approximately 360 acres. The course is about 45 minutes from downtown Shanghai. The course landscape is characterized by over 60,000 trees, including Yulan Magnolia, ornamental Osmanthus, and a 1,000-year-old Ginkgo. The architects modeled the course after the Donald Ross design at Oak Hill, incorporating "downhill tee shots and approach shots to elevated greens."The club is known for its exclusivity; as of July 2010, the initiation fee was reported to be $240,000.

Sheshan served as the host site for the HSBC Champions from 2005 through 2019, with the exception of 2012, when the event was held at Mission Hills Golf Club in Guangdong. The tournament gained World Golf Championship (WGC) status in 2009. In 2013, the WGC-HSBC Champions became an official European Tour and PGA Tour event with a purse of US$8.5 million, the highest in East Asia at the time. Notable participants have included Tiger Woods, Phil Mickelson, Rory McIlroy, and Lee Westwood.

The course is recognized globally for its high level of difficulty. In October 2019, Golf Week listed three of Sheshan's holes among the 15 most difficult on the 2018-19 PGA Tour. According to tour data, the par-4 ninth hole was the most difficult on the schedule, and the course also featured the most difficult par 3 and par 5 on the Tour.

In January 2021, Golf Magazine ranked Sheshan eighth on its list of the world's most difficult courses, noting that it "has some brutally difficult golf holes," including a demanding par-5 that requires three shots to reach the green for most professional golfers.

== WGC-HSBC Champions ==
The WGC-HSBC Champions is a professional golf tournament held annually in China. It is sanctioned by the International Federation of PGA Tours (Asian Tour, European Tour, Japan Golf Tour, PGA Tour, PGA Tour of Australasia, and Sunshine Tour) and the China Golf Association. Inaugurated in 2005, the tournament features a purse of US$8.5 million, the largest in the Asia-Pacific region.

Initially established as the HSBC Champions, the event was designated as a World Golf Championships tournament in 2009. In 2013, it became an official PGA Tour event and was integrated into the FedEx Cup schedule.

Traditionally played in November, it served as the fourth and final tournament on the WGC calendar, alongside the WGC Mexico Championship, WGC Match Play, and the WGC St. Jude Invitational. The field is composed of top-ranked players from the six major international tours and the China Golf Association. Qualification is extended to leading money winners from the sanctioning tours, and winners of major championships and the other World Golf Championships tournaments.

The WGC-HSBC Champions was cancelled for three consecutive years (2020, 2021, and 2022) due to the COVID-19 pandemic. Although the tournament remained under contract with the PGA Tour as of 2023, it has not been contested since its initial cancellation in 2020.

== Awards and recognition ==
Since 2005, the Sheshan Golf Club has received industry awards, including recognition from Golf Digest, Asia Golf Monthly, and others.

Year	Awarding Party	Award
2025	World Golf Awards	China's Best Golf Course 2025 (nominee)
2024	World Golf Awards	China's Best Golf Course 2024 (nominee)
2024	Golf Digest	The Best Golf Courses in China – 2nd
2024	Golf Digest	World's 100 Greatest Golf Courses – 97th
2024	Golf Inspired	Best Courses of 2024 – 2nd
2023	World Golf Awards	China's Best Golf Course 2023 (nominee)
2022	World Golf Awards	China's Best Golf Course 2022 (nominee)
2022	Golf Digest	The Best Golf Courses in China – 3rd
2021	World Golf Awards	China's Best Golf Course 2021 (nominee)
2020–2021	China Daily	2020-2021 Platinum Club of Asia-Pacific
2020	World Golf Awards	China's Best Golf Course 2020 (nominee)
2019	World Golf Awards	China's Best Golf Course 2019 (nominee)
2019	China Daily	China's No. 1 Golf Course
2019	Golf Digest	World's 100 Greatest Golf Courses – 85th
2018	World Golf Awards	China's Best Golf Course 2018 (nominee)
2018	South China Morning Post	5 Top-Hole Golf Courses in China for Elites – 1st
2018	Golf Digest	Complete 200 Greatest International Golf Courses
2017	World Golf Awards	China's Best Golf Course 2017 (nominee)
2016	Golf Digest	World's 100 Greatest Golf Courses – 86th
2016	Imperial Tours	Top 5 Golf Clubs Around China’s Scenic Spots
2016	World Golf Awards	China's Best Golf Course 2016 (nominee)
2015	Golf Magazine	Top Club in China
2015	Hurun Research Institute	Best Golf Club in Shanghai
2015	Americangolf.com	Asia's WOW Course
2015	Aligolf.com	Asia Top 10 Golf Courses
2015	World Golf Awards	China's Best Golf Course 2015 (nominee)
2014	Golf Punk	Top 10 Championship Golf Courses
2014	Golf Magazine	Top 10 Golf Courses in China
2014	Golf Digest (US)	World's 100 Greatest 100 Golf Courses – 82nd
2014	World Golf Awards	China's Best Golf Course 2014 (nominee)
2013	Golf Vacation & Lifestyle Magazine	Top 10 Golf Club Restaurants in China
2013	Golf Vacation & Lifestyle Magazine	Top 10 Golf Clubhouses in China
2013	Golf Vacation & Lifestyle Magazine	Top 30 Must-Play Golf Courses in China
2013	Golf Punk	Best Golf Course
2013	Golf Punk	Best Golf Club
2013	Golf Punk	Best Golf Community
2013	Golf Digest (China)	Top 100 Golf Courses in China – 1st
2013	Golf Digest (China)	Top 10 Golf Clubs in China – 2nd
2013	Golf Digest (China)	Top Golf Community in China
2013	International Property Media Ltd.	Best Golf Development (Asia Pacific)
2013	International Property Media Ltd.	Best Golf Course (Asia Pacific)
2013	International Property Media Ltd.	Best Golf Development (China)
2013	International Property Media Ltd.	Best Golf Course (China)
2013	International Property Media Ltd.	Highly Commented Architecture Single Residence (China)
2012	Travel & Leisure Magazine	Top 10 Golf Courses
2011–2012	Golf Weekly	Top Golf Club in Shanghai
2011–2012	Golf Digest (US)	89th Best Course in the World (Outside of the US)
2011	GOLF Magazine	Top 10 Golf Courses in China
2010–2011	Golf Digest (China)	Top 100 Golf Courses in China – 1st
2010–2011	Golf Digest (China)	Top Golf Community in China – 1st
2010–2011	Golf Digest (China)	Top 10 Golf Clubs in China – 2nd
2011	Asian Golf Monthly	Best Course in China – 2nd Runner Up
2011	Golf Vacation & Lifestyle Magazine	Top 30 Must-Play Golf Courses in China
2010	Travel & Leisure Magazine	Top 10 Golf Courses of the Year
2010	GOLF Magazine	Top 10 Golf Courses in China
2010	Golf Weekly	Top Club in Shanghai
2010	Asian Golf Monthly	Best Championship Course in Asia-Pacific
2010	Asian Golf Monthly	Runner-Up Best Course in China
2010	Asian Golf Monthly	6th Best Maintained Course in Asia
2009–2010	Golf Digest (US)	Top 100 Best Golf Course outside the United States – 68th
2009	Golf Weekly	Top Golf Club at Shanghai
2009	Golf Digest (China)	Top Golf Course in China – 2nd Runner Up
2009	Asian Golf Monthly	Best Championship Course in Asia-Pacific
2009	Asian Golf Monthly	Runner-Up Best Golf Course in China
2009	Asian Golf Monthly	2nd Runner-Up Best Maintained Course in Asia-Pacific
2009	Golfers' Choice, Golf Vacations Magazine	10 Most Outstanding Golf Courses
2009	Golf Punk	Course of the Year
2009	Golf Onlife.com	Course of the Year
2009	Focus Media	Course of the Year
2008	Golf Digest	Top 10 Courses in China – 3rd
2008–2009	Golf Digest (China)	China's Top 10 Golf Clubs – 1st
2008	Asian Golf Monthly	Best Club House in Asia – 2nd Runner Up
2008	Asian Golf Monthly	Best Maintained Course in Asia – 1st Runner Up
2008	Asian Golf Monthly	Best Championship Course in Asia – 2nd Runner Up
2008	GOLF Magazine	Top 10 Golf Courses in China
2007	球场点评	10 Best Golf Clubs in China
2007	Golf Outdoor Golf Weekly	Top Golf Club in City
2007	Asian Golf Monthly	Best Championship Course in Asia – 2nd Runner Up
2007	Asian Golf Monthly	Best Course in China – 2nd Runner Up
2007	Golf Digest China	Top 10 Golf Courses in China
2006	GOLF Magazine	Top 10 Golf Courses in China
2005	Golf Digest-HK Magazine Senasia Publication	Best New Golf Club
2005	China Golf	Best Golf Property
2005	China Golf	Top 10 Par 4 – Hole 16
