= Robert Rock =

English professional golfer (born 1977)

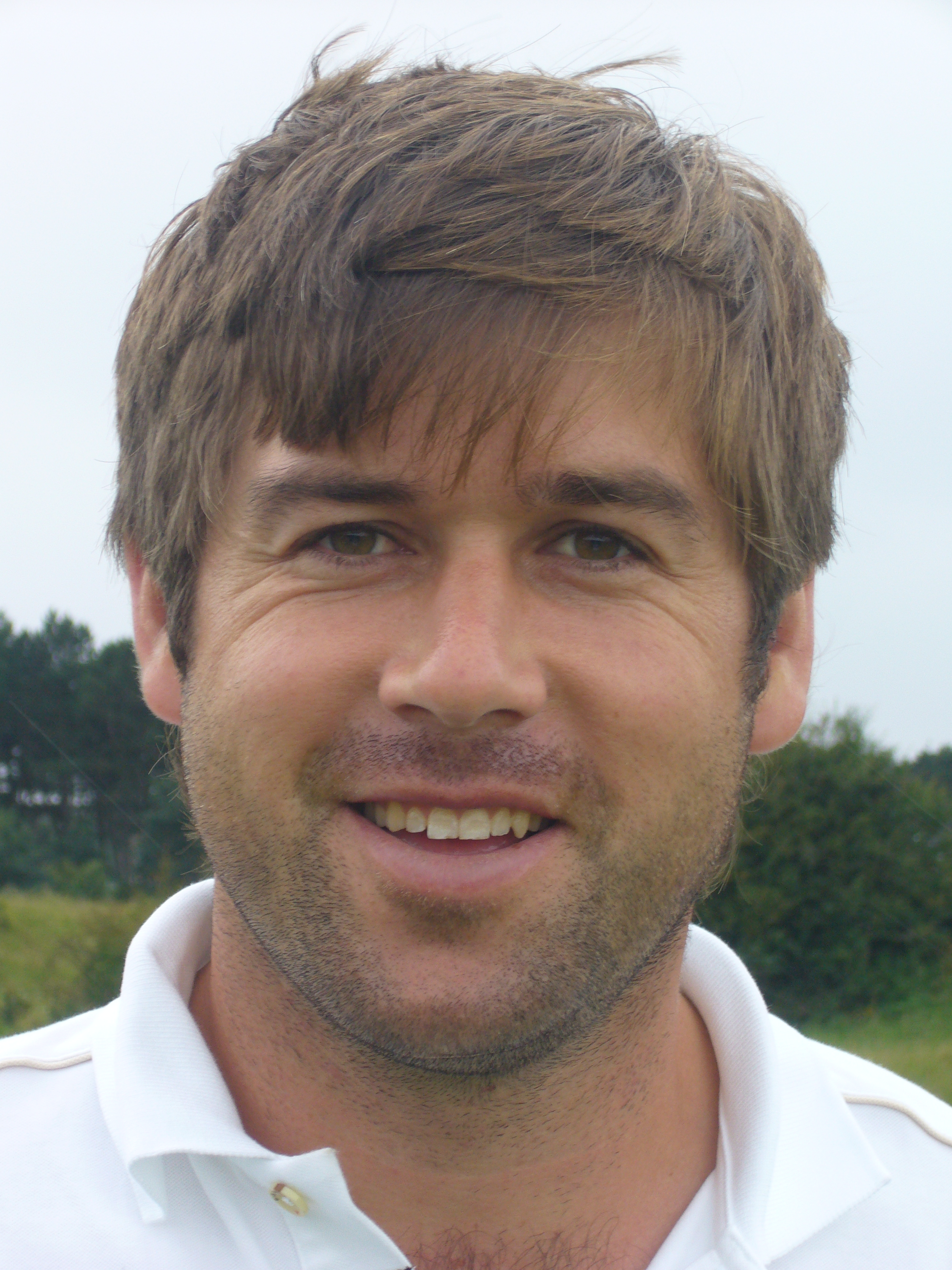

Personal information
- Nationality: England
- Born: 6 April 1977 (age 49) Armitage, Staffordshire, England
- Height: 5 ft 10 in (1.78 m)
- Weight: 168 lb (76 kg; 12.0 st)
- Spouse: Lynda Rock (m. 2007, divorced)
- Children: 1

Career
- Sport: Golf
- Turned professional: 1998
- Current tour: European Players Tour
- Former tours: European Tour; Challenge Tour
- Professional wins: 3
- Highest ranking: 55 (29 January 2012)

Number of wins by tour
- European Tour: 2
- Other: 1

Best results in major championships
- Masters Tournament: DNP
- PGA Championship: CUT: 2012
- U.S. Open: T23: 2011
- The Open Championship: T7: 2010

Robert Rock (born 6 April 1977) is an English professional golfer. He played on the European Tour from 2003 to 2022. He has won twice on the tour, the 2011 BMW Italian Open and the 2012 Abu Dhabi HSBC Golf Championship. He lost to Irish amateur Shane Lowry in a playoff at the 2009 3 Irish Open, but still collected the first prize of €500,000.

== Early life ==
Rock was born in Armitage, near Lichfield in Staffordshire, and grew up and was educated in nearby Rugeley.

== Professional career ==
Rock joined the European Tour as an affiliate member in 2003. His breakthrough season was 2009, when he managed three second-place finishes, including at the Irish Open, where he tied for first place but lost to Irish amateur Shane Lowry at the third hole of a sudden-death playoff, but collected the first prize of €500,000. He finished the 2009 season ranked in the top thirty of the Race to Dubai. He finished tied for 7th place in the 2010 Open Championship, despite a second round 78 played in very windy conditions.

Rock won his maiden European Tour title at the BMW Italian Open in Turin in June 2011. He won by one stroke over Gary Boyd and Thorbjørn Olesen despite a final round 62 from Olesen. He made his U.S. Open debut the following week, having qualified via a European sectional qualifying event. Because of difficulties in obtaining a visa, he only arrived in the United States at 3:30 am on the Thursday morning, less than 12 hours before the start of his round. Despite this, he managed an under-par opening round of 70 and finished tied for 23rd place at 3 under par.

Rock won his second European Tour title at the 2012 Abu Dhabi HSBC Golf Championship, finishing one shot ahead of Rory McIlroy. He entered the final round at 11 under par, tied for the lead with Tiger Woods, but outshone the American on Sunday to shoot a 2 under round of 70 to claim victory. After the win he rose to a career-high 55 in the world rankings.

Since his 2012 win, his best finish has been a runner-up finish behind Paul Casey in the 2013 Irish Open.

He was well known as one of the few professional golfers that did not wear a hat while he played, despite the sponsorship income it can bring.

On 6 July 2019, Rock shot a 10-under-par 60 at Lahinch Golf Club in the third round of the Dubai Duty Free Irish Open. This score set an Irish Open record and a Rolex Series record. Rock had 35 feet left for eagle from the fringe at Lahinch's par-5 18th hole, but missed just left. Rock, who shot 7-under 29 on the back nine, was 13 under for the championship and led Rafa Cabrera-Bello (63) and Eddie Pepperell (66) by a shot entering the event's final round. Rock shot a final round 70 and finished the event tied for 4th.

In October 2022, Rock announced his retirement from professional golf.

His most recent win came at Royal Birkdale at the 2023 Merseyside Open on the European Players Tour with a winning score of −4.

== Professional wins (3) ==
=== European Tour wins (2) ===
No.	Date	Tournament	Winning score	Margin of victory	Runner(s)-up
1	12 Jun 2011	BMW Italian Open	−21 (64-68-68-67=267)	1 stroke	(England) Gary Boyd, (Denmark) Thorbjørn Olesen
2	29 Jan 2012	Abu Dhabi HSBC Golf Championship	−13 (69-70-66-70=275)	1 stroke	(Northern Ireland) Rory McIlroy

European Tour playoff record (0–1)

No.	Year	Tournament	Opponent	Result
1	2009	3 Irish Open	(Republic of Ireland) Shane Lowry (a)	Lost to par on third extra hole

=== Other wins (1) ===
- 2002 Midland Professional Championship

== Playoff record ==
Challenge Tour playoff record (0–1)

No.	Year	Tournament	Opponents	Result
1	2003	Ryder Cup Wales Challenge	(England) Robert Coles, (England) Sam Walker, (Wales) Craig Williams	Williams won with birdie on first extra hole

== Results in major championships ==
Tournament	2005	2006	2007	2008	2009
Masters Tournament					
U.S. Open					
The Open Championship	T67	T16			CUT
PGA Championship					

Tournament	2010	2011	2012	2013	2014	2015	2016	2017	2018
Masters Tournament									
U.S. Open		T23	CUT						
The Open Championship	T7	T38	CUT				CUT		
PGA Championship			CUT						

Tournament	2019	2020	2021	2022	2023	2024
Masters Tournament						
PGA Championship						
U.S. Open						CUT
The Open Championship	CUT	NT				

Top 10
Did not play

CUT = missed the half-way cut
"T" = tied
NT = no tournament

=== Summary ===
Tournament	Wins	2nd	3rd	Top-5	Top-10	Top-25	Events	Cuts made
Masters Tournament	0	0	0	0	0	0	0	0
PGA Championship	0	0	0	0	0	0	1	0
U.S. Open	0	0	0	0	0	1	3	1
The Open Championship	0	0	0	0	1	2	8	4
Totals	0	0	0	0	1	3	12	5

- Most consecutive cuts made – 3 (2010 Open Championship – 2011 Open Championship)
- Longest streak of top-10s – 1

== Results in World Golf Championships ==
Tournament	2011	2012
Match Play		R32
Championship		T24
Invitational		T71
Champions	T33	T72

Did not play

QF, R16, R32, R64 = Round in which player lost in match play
"T" = Tied

== Team appearances ==
Professional

- Seve Trophy (representing Great Britain & Ireland): 2009 (winners), 2011 (winners)

== See also ==
- 2005 European Tour Qualifying School graduates
