= Ian Poulter =

English professional golfer (born 1976)

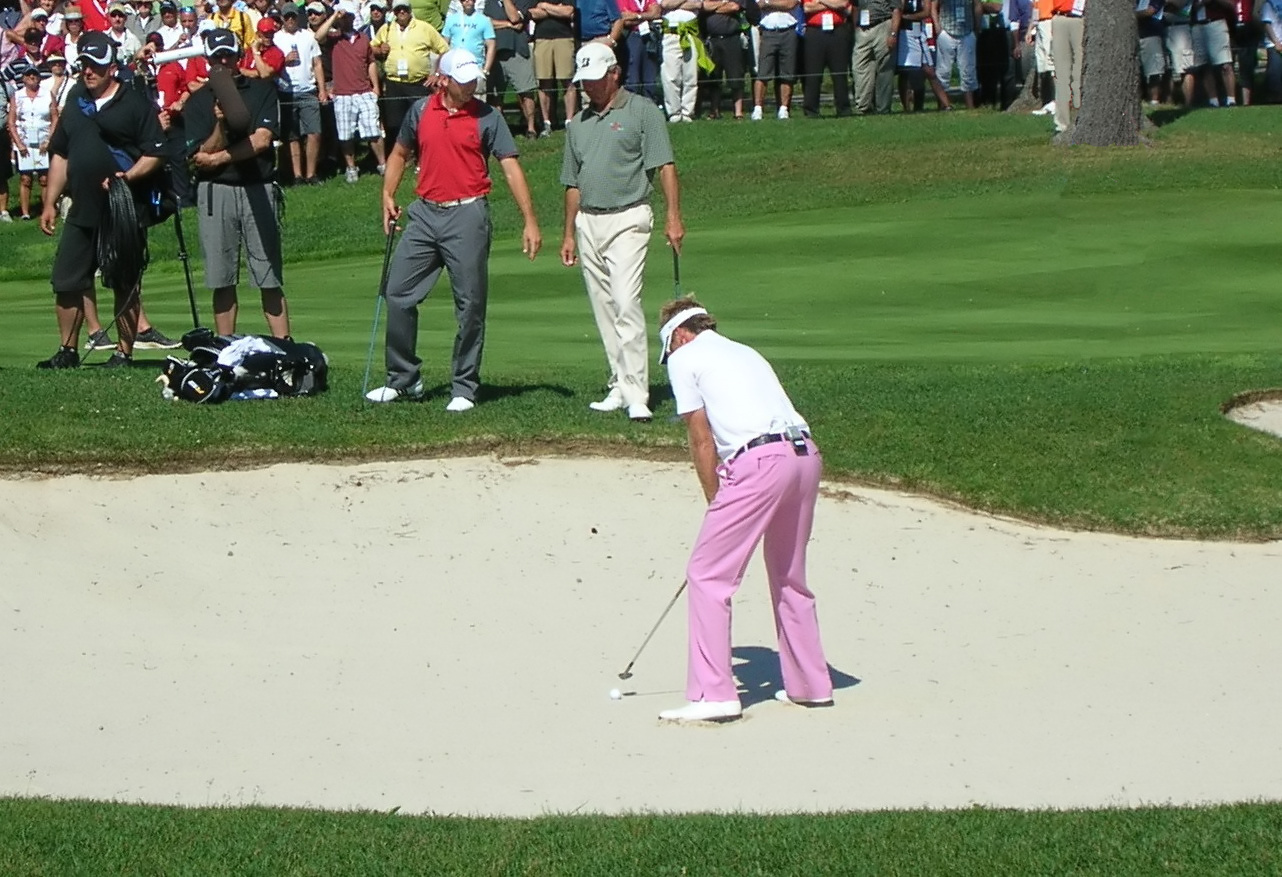
- Poulter at the 2009 Telus Skins Game

Personal information
- Full name: Ian James Poulter
- Nickname: The Postman
- Nationality: England
- Born: 10 January 1976 (age 50) Hitchin, Hertfordshire, England
- Height: 6 ft 1 in (1.85 m)
- Weight: 189 lb (86 kg; 13.5 st)

Career
- Sport: Golf
- Turned professional: 1995
- Current tour: LIV Golf
- Former tours: PGA Tour; European Tour; Challenge Tour
- Professional wins: 17
- Highest ranking: 5 (21 February 2010)

Number of wins by tour
- PGA Tour: 3
- European Tour: 12
- Japan Golf Tour: 1
- Asian Tour: 2
- PGA Tour of Australasia: 1
- Challenge Tour: 1
- Other: 1

Best results in major championships
- Masters Tournament: T6: 2015
- PGA Championship: T3: 2012
- U.S. Open: T12: 2006
- The Open Championship: 2nd: 2008

Achievements and awards
- Sir Henry Cotton Rookie of the Year: 2000

Ian James Poulter (born 10 January 1976) is an English professional golfer. He has previously been ranked as high as number 5 in the world rankings. The highlights of Poulter's career to date have been his two World Golf Championship wins at the 2010 WGC-Accenture Match Play Championship and the 2012 WGC-HSBC Champions, as well as being part of five Ryder Cup winning European teams. He is the touring professional for Woburn Golf and Country Club.

== Early life ==
Born in Hitchin, and raised in Stevenage, Poulter took up the game at the age of four when his single-handicap father, Terry, gave him a cut-down 3-wood. His older brother Danny is also a professional golfer. Unable to get a place as a pro at a private club, he became the assistant pro and golf shop manager at the Chesfield Downs Golf Club. There he was forced by his boss to pay a full green fee every time he wanted to play in a competition. His handicap hence stayed at four, because he did not play in competitions. Following this period, Poulter joined as Assistant Pro at Leighton Buzzard golf course, giving lessons to youngsters at £1 per lesson. He is an avid fan of football club Arsenal.

== Professional career ==
In 1996, Poulter turned professional. He earned his first win at the 1999 Open de Côte d'Ivoire on the European Tour's second tier Challenge Tour. He won promotion to the European Tour itself via the qualifying school later that year. In his first season, he claimed the Italian Open title and was the Sir Henry Cotton Rookie of the Year for 2000. Further wins followed in each of the next four seasons, most prestigiously the season ending "tour championship" the Volvo Masters in 2004. He was in the top ten on the Order of Merit in 2003, 2004, 2006, 2009, 2010 and 2012. In 2013, he finished 2nd on the Order of Merit, his highest placing so far. After narrowly missing a place in the 2002 European Ryder Cup team, Poulter was a member of the victorious squad in 2004, where he officially scored the winning points for his team.

At the 2008 Masters Tournament, Poulter made a hole-in-one at the 16th hole at Augusta National in the first round. At the 2008 Open Championship, Poulter had the clubhouse lead on the last round before being beaten by defending champion Pádraig Harrington. In the 2008 Ryder Cup, Poulter was the highest points scorer on either side as he scored 4 of Europe's 11.5 points. Europe lost the Ryder Cup 16.5–11.5. In the 2009 Players Championship, he finished in sole possession of second place at eight under-par, four shots behind the winner, Henrik Stenson. In November 2009, Poulter won the Barclays Singapore Open at the Sentosa Club. He moved into the top-10 of the Official World Golf Ranking in January 2010 with a second-place finish at the Abu Dhabi Golf Championship.

In February 2010, he won his first tournament on U.S. soil, beating fellow Englishman Paul Casey 4&2 in the final of the WGC-Accenture Match Play Championship in Arizona. The win moved him to 5th in the world rankings. His ranking gained Poulter a place in the 2010 Ryder Cup in September at Celtic Manor in Wales He won 3 points in the 4 matches he played in the European team's win by 14.5 points to 13.5. In November 2010, he won his second title of the year with a one-stroke victory in the UBS Hong Kong Open.

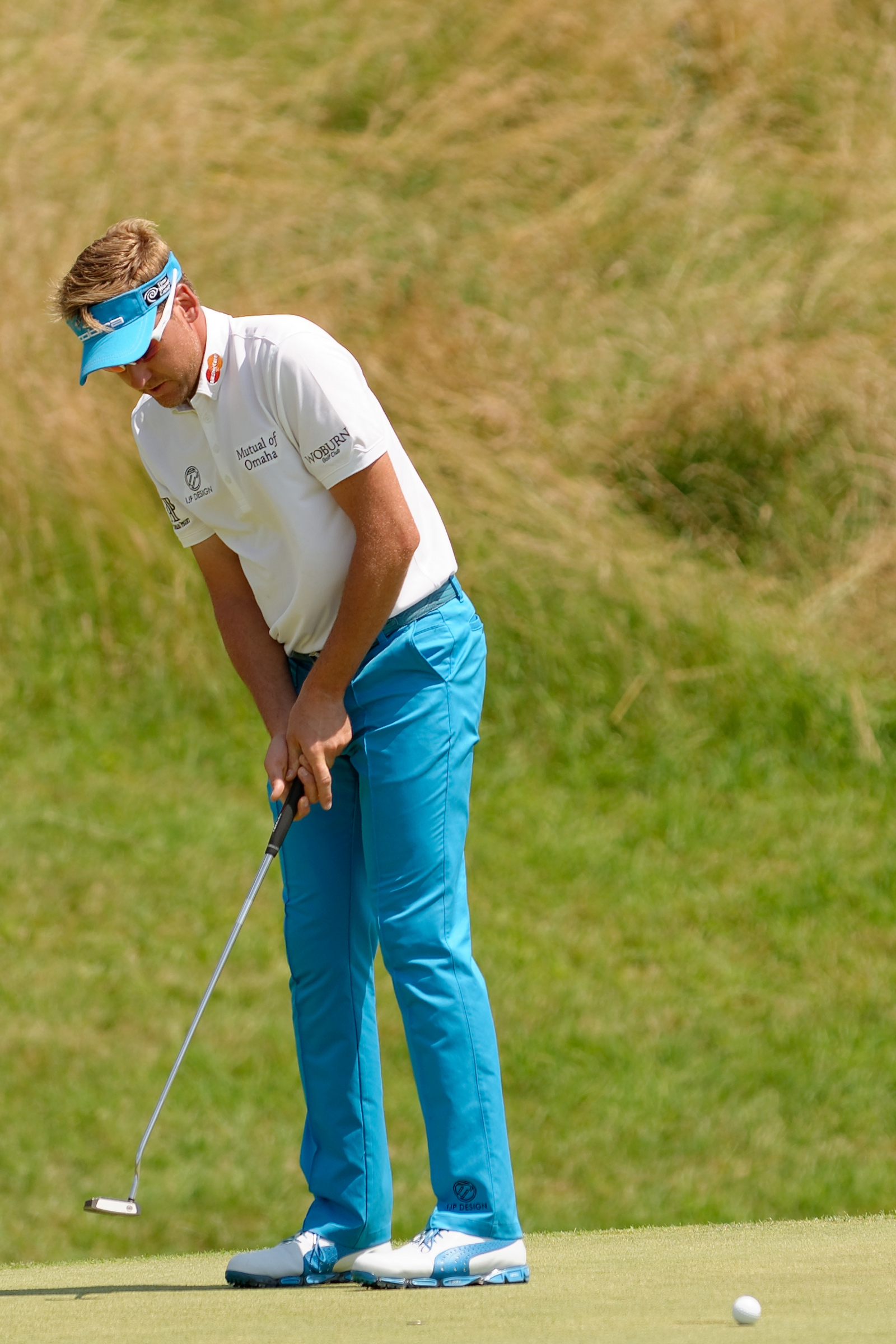
Poulter at the 2013 Open de France

On 23 February 2011, in Marana, Arizona, Poulter became the first defending champion in nine years to be eliminated in the first round of the WGC-Accenture Match Play Championship. He did however enjoy greater success in the European Tour's own match play event, the Volvo World Match Play Championship where he won the title beating Ryder Cup teammate Luke Donald, 2&1, in the final. He had previously beaten the world number one Lee Westwood, Francesco Molinari and Nicolas Colsaerts to get to the final. This was Poulter's second tournament win in a match play event and eleventh European Tour victory. Poulter was one of José María Olazábal's two "captains picks" for the European Team at the 2012 Ryder Cup. He won all the 4 matches he played over the three days of the event, and was a key figure in sparking his team's victory by 14.5 points to 13.5.

On 4 November 2012, Poulter won the second World Golf Championship of his career at the WGC-HSBC Champions in Shenzhen, China, coming from four strokes back in the final round to win by two from four other players. He shot a final round of 65 which included 8 birdies in his first 15 holes to seize control and despite a late bogey, closed out the victory by two strokes. He became only the second European to have won multiple WGC events, after Darren Clarke. The victory took Poulter to 15th in the rankings.

At the 2015 Honda Classic on the PGA Tour, Poulter had a three shot lead going into the final round of the rain delayed event. However he had a disastrous four-over-par final round of 74, where he found the water five times, included twice on the 14th hole which cost him a triple bogey. Poulter would finish in a tie for third, one shot outside of the playoff, which was won by Pádraig Harrington. It was his first 54-hole lead on the PGA Tour and he never would win a non-WGC PGA Tour event until 2018. In the same year, Poulter was in a predicament. He fell to 51st in the OWGR and was not exempt for the WGC-HSBC Champions, and had failed to enter the UBS Hong Kong Open. He was also at risk of losing his European Tour card since he had only played in 12 events, one short of membership and Ryder Cup eligibility. He only earned entry to the Hong Kong Open after Rich Beem gave up his sponsor exemption to allow Poulter to compete.

In March 2016, Poulter held the 54-hole lead at the Puerto Rico Open, an alternate event on the PGA Tour. He led by one stroke entering the final round, but shot an even-par round which included just the one birdie, to finish in a tie for third, one stroke outside of the playoff. This was only the second time that Poulter had held a 54-hole lead in an event on the PGA Tour and he has yet to win one. The result was however his best on tour for over a year.

On 3 June 2016, Poulter was ruled out of the upcoming Ryder Cup after being sidelined for four months with a foot injury. Only three days later, he was named by captain Darren Clarke as one of his vice-captains for the match.

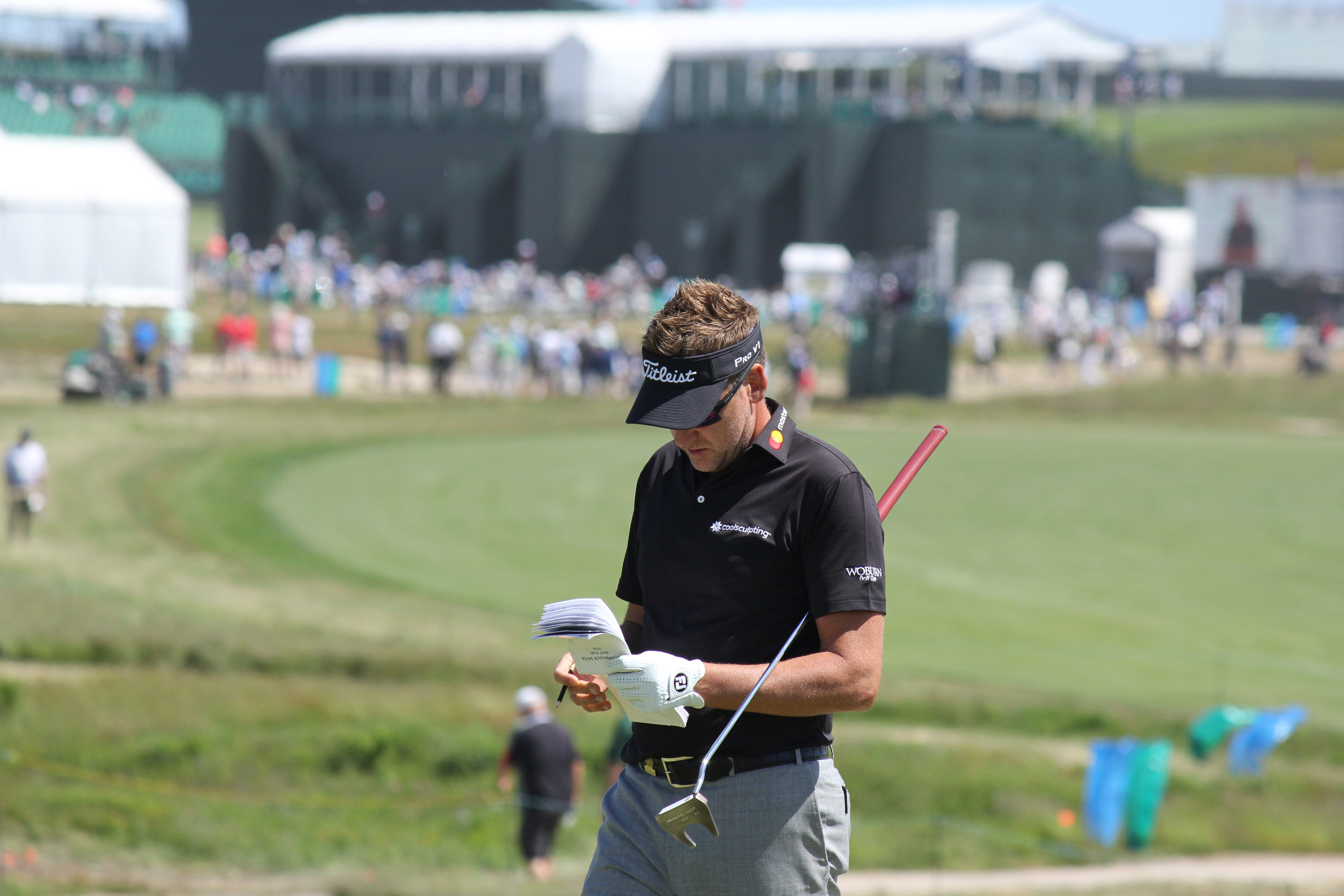
Poulter at the 2018 U.S. Open

Poulter started the 2016–17 season using a major medical extension. He initially failed to meet the terms, but his results and criteria were reevaluated, allowing Poulter to keep his Tour card for the remainder of the season. The Golf Channel website also mentioned that Brian Gay (who was also playing on a major medical extension) noted a discrepancy in the points distribution from the previous season. After recalculating, Gay and Poulter were also allowed entry into the 2017 Players Championship after meeting the FedEx Cup requirements. Poulter went on to finish T2 at The Players, three shots behind Kim Si-woo.

During the 2018 WGC-Match Play, Poulter was informed by members of the media that his advancement to the quarterfinals would place him in the top-50 in the World Golf Rankings, ensuring his place in the Masters' field two weeks later. It was later determined that he would need to advance to the semifinals to crack the top-50, which he was unable to do, losing heavily to Kevin Kisner in the quarterfinals.

The following week, Poulter won the Houston Open, claiming his third victory on the PGA Tour and first stroke play tournament win in the United States. Poulter won in a sudden-death playoff, after holing a lengthy birdie putt on the final green of regulation play to tie Beau Hossler. In the playoff, Poulter won with a par, after Hossler found the water and made a triple bogey. This was Poulter's first win in six years on any tour and also sealed his place in the Masters the following week as the final entrant. He finished T44 at the event. Then playing his sixth week in a row, Poulter held the 54-hole lead at the RBC Heritage. He faded in the final round though, shooting a 75 and finishing T7.

In September 2018, Poulter was named as a captain's pick by Thomas Bjørn for the European team participating in the 2018 Ryder Cup. Europe defeated the United States team by 17½ points to 10½ at Le Golf National outside of Paris, France. Poulter went 2–2–0 and won his singles match against then world number one Dustin Johnson. In September 2021, Poulter was a captain's pick by Pádraig Harrington for the European team in the 2021 Ryder Cup at Whistling Straits in Kohler, Wisconsin. The U.S. team won 19–9 and Poulter went 1–2–0 and won his Sunday singles match against Tony Finau.

Poulter was announced as a participant of the inaugural LIV Golf Invitational Series tournament at the Centurion Club near London in June 2022, with his PGA Tour and European Tour memberships being suspended. His fine and suspension on the European Tour were temporarily lifted in July, pending a court case set for February 2023. After those sanctions were upheld by the independent arbitrator, in May 2023, the European Tour announced that he had resigned his membership of the tour.

== Personal life ==
As a teen, Poulter attended The Barclay School in Stevenage.

Poulter and his wife, Katie, have four children and live in Lake Nona Golf & Country Club in Orlando, Florida. The couple also have a home in Milton Keynes, Buckinghamshire.

Poulter is well known for his eccentric dress sense, inspired by his mother, who managed the Letchworth branch of UK women's fashion chain Dorothy Perkins. His most famous pieces include trousers featuring the famous Claret Jug, worn at both the 2005 and 2006 Open Championships.

In addition to his golfing career, Poulter launched Ian Poulter Design (IJP Design) in 2007.

Poulter appears in the sports documentary series Full Swing, which premiered on Netflix on 15 February 2023.

== Professional wins (17) ==
=== PGA Tour wins (3) ===
Legend
World Golf Championships (2)
Other PGA Tour (1)

No.	Date	Tournament	Winning score	To par	Margin of victory	Runner(s)-up
1	21 Feb 2010	WGC-Accenture Match Play Championship	4 and 2			(England) Paul Casey
2	4 Nov 2012	WGC-HSBC Champions (Note: The 2012 WGC-HSBC Champions was an unofficial PGA Tour event, but wins were counted as official if the winner was a PGA Tour member; as Poulter was.)	69-68-65-65=267	−21	2 strokes	(United States) Jason Dufner, (South Africa) Ernie Els, (United States) Phil Mickelson, (United States) Scott Piercy
3	1 Apr 2018	Houston Open	73-64-65-67=269	−19	Playoff	(United States) Beau Hossler

PGA Tour playoff record (1–0)

No.	Year	Tournament	Opponent	Result
1	2018	Houston Open	(United States) Beau Hossler	Won with par on first extra hole

=== European Tour wins (12) ===
Legend
World Golf Championships (2)
Tour Championships (1)
Other European Tour (9)

No.	Date	Tournament	Winning score	To par	Margin of victory	Runner(s)-up
1	29 Oct 2000	Italian Open	66-67-65-69=267	−21	1 stroke	(Scotland) Gordon Brand Jnr
2	15 Apr 2001	Moroccan Open	71-67-69-70=277	−15	2 strokes	(England) David Lynn
3	3 Nov 2002	Italian Open Telecom Italia (2)	61-67-69=197 (Note: Shortened to 54 holes due to weather.)	−19	2 strokes	(Scotland) Paul Lawrie
4	1 Jun 2003	Celtic Manor Resort Wales Open	65-67-68-70=270	−18	3 strokes	(South Africa) Darren Fichardt, (England) Jonathan Lomas, (Australia) Jarrod Moseley
5	10 Aug 2003	Nordic Open	68-67-65-66=266	−22	1 stroke	(Scotland) Colin Montgomerie
6	31 Oct 2004	Volvo Masters Andalucía	71-67-69-70=277	−7	Playoff	(Spain) Sergio García
7	17 Sep 2006	XXXII Banco Madrid Valle Romano; Open de Madrid Golf Masters	67-66-64-69=266	−22	5 strokes	(Spain) Ignacio Garrido
8	1 Nov 2009	Barclays Singapore Open^{1}	66-64-72-72=274	−10	1 stroke	(China) Liang Wenchong
9	21 Feb 2010	WGC-Accenture Match Play Championship	4 and 2			(England) Paul Casey
10	21 Nov 2010	UBS Hong Kong Open^{1}	67-60-64-67=258	−22	1 stroke	(England) Simon Dyson, (Italy) Matteo Manassero
11	22 May 2011	Volvo World Match Play Championship	2 and 1			(England) Luke Donald
12	4 Nov 2012	WGC-HSBC Champions	69-68-65-65=267	−21	2 strokes	(United States) Jason Dufner, (South Africa) Ernie Els, (United States) Phil Mickelson, (United States) Scott Piercy

^{1}Co-sanctioned by the Asian Tour

European Tour playoff record (1–1)

No.	Year	Tournament	Opponent	Result
1	2004	Volvo Masters Andalucía	(Spain) Sergio García	Won with par on first extra hole
2	2010	Dubai World Championship	(Sweden) Robert Karlsson	Lost to birdie on second extra hole

=== Japan Golf Tour wins (1) ===
No.	Date	Tournament	Winning score	To par	Margin of victory	Runner-up
1	18 Nov 2007	Dunlop Phoenix Tournament	65-68-67-69=269	−11	3 strokes	(Spain) Gonzalo Fernández-Castaño

=== PGA Tour of Australasia wins (1) ===
No.	Date	Tournament	Winning score	To par	Margin of victory	Runner-up
1	18 Dec 2011	JBWere Masters	65-68-69-67=269	−15	3 strokes	(Australia) Marcus Fraser

=== Challenge Tour wins (1) ===
No.	Date	Tournament	Winning score	To par	Margin of victory	Runners-up
1	18 Apr 1999	Open de Côte d'Ivoire	69-72-70-73=284	−4	2 strokes	(France) Sébastien Delagrange, (Wales) David Park, (France) Marc Pendariès

=== Other wins (1) ===
No.	Date	Tournament	Winning score	To par	Margin of victory	Runners-up
1	12 Dec 2010	Shark Shootout (with (United States) Dustin Johnson)	63-64-59=186	−30	2 strokes	(Northern Ireland) Darren Clarke and (Northern Ireland) Graeme McDowell

== Results in major championships ==
Results not in chronological order in 2020.

Tournament	2000	2001	2002	2003	2004	2005	2006	2007	2008	2009
Masters Tournament					T31	T33		T13	T25	T20
U.S. Open					CUT	T57	T12	T36	WD	T18
The Open Championship	T64		T50	T46	T25	T11	CUT	T27	2	CUT
PGA Championship		CUT		T61	T37	T47	T9	T23	T31	T19

Tournament	2010	2011	2012	2013	2014	2015	2016	2017	2018
Masters Tournament	T10	T27	7	CUT	T20	T6	T49		T44
U.S. Open	T47	CUT	T41	T21	T17	T54			T25
The Open Championship	T60	CUT	T9	T3	CUT	CUT		T14	CUT
PGA Championship	WD	T39	T3	T61	T58	CUT		T22	T31

Tournament	2019	2020	2021	2022
Masters Tournament	T12	T25	T26	
PGA Championship	CUT	T22	T30	CUT
U.S. Open	CUT	CUT	T40	
The Open Championship	CUT	NT	T26	T62

Top 10
Did not play

CUT = missed the half-way cut
WD = withdrew
"T" indicates a tie for a place
NT = No tournament due to COVID-19 pandemic

=== Summary ===
Tournament	Wins	2nd	3rd	Top-5	Top-10	Top-25	Events	Cuts made
Masters Tournament	0	0	0	0	3	9	16	15
PGA Championship	0	0	1	1	2	6	20	15
U.S. Open	0	0	0	0	0	5	16	11
The Open Championship	0	1	1	2	3	6	20	13
Totals	0	1	2	3	8	26	72	54

- Most consecutive cuts made – 7 (2004 Open Championship – 2006 U.S. Open)
- Longest streak of top-10s – 2 (2012 Open Championship – 2012 PGA)

== Results in The Players Championship ==
Tournament	2004	2005	2006	2007	2008	2009
The Players Championship	T33	CUT	T27	T28	T21	2

Tournament	2010	2011	2012	2013	2014	2015	2016	2017	2018	2019
The Players Championship	CUT	T57	T25	CUT	T65	T30	T57	T2	T11	T56

Tournament	2020	2021	2022
The Players Championship	C	CUT	T33

Top 10

CUT = missed the halfway cut
"T" indicates a tie for a place
C = Cancelled after the first round due to the COVID-19 pandemic

== World Golf Championships ==
=== Wins (2) ===
Year	Championship	54 holes	Winning score	Margin	Runner(s)-up
2010	WGC-Accenture Match Play Championship	n/a	4 and 2		(England) Paul Casey
2012	WGC-HSBC Champions	4 shot deficit	−21 (69-68-65-65=267)	2 strokes	(United States) Jason Dufner, (South Africa) Ernie Els, (United States) Phil Mickelson, (United States) Scott Piercy

=== Results timeline ===
Results not in chronological order before 2015.

Tournament	2001	2002	2003	2004	2005	2006	2007	2008	2009	2010	2011	2012	2013	2014	2015	2016	2017	2018	2019
Championship	NT^{1}		T44		T18	T2	T16	T57	T13	T37	T45	T60	T28	T52	T49				T3
Match Play				QF	4	R64	R16	R32	R16	1	R64	R64	4	R64	T34			QF	T17
Invitational	T13		T33		T33	T13	T30	T16	T15	T65	T68	T29	T19	T52	T17			T10	8
Champions									T45	T13	T13	1	2	T6	T30			21	WD

Tournament	2020	2021	2022
Championship			
Match Play	NT^{2}	R16	T35
Invitational	T69	T10	
Champions	NT^{2}	NT^{2}	NT^{2}

^{1}Cancelled due to 9/11
^{2}Cancelled due to COVID-19 pandemic

Win
Top 10
Did not play

QF, R16, R32, R64 = Round in which player lost in match play
"T" = Tied
NT = No tournament
Note that the HSBC Champions did not become a WGC event until 2009.
Note that the Championship and Invitational were discontinued from 2022.

== Team appearances ==
- Ryder Cup (representing Europe): 2004 (winners), 2008, 2010 (winners), 2012 (winners), 2014 (winners), 2018 (winners), 2021

Ryder Cup points record
2004	2006	2008	2010	2012	2014	2016	2018	2021	Total
1	–	4	3	4	1	–	2	1	16

- World Cup (representing England): 2001, 2007, 2008, 2009, 2011, 2018
- Seve Trophy (representing Great Britain & Ireland): 2003 (winners), 2005 (winners), 2011 (winners)
- EurAsia Cup (representing Europe): 2016 (winners)

== See also ==
- List of golfers with most European Tour wins
