= Scott Piercy =

American professional golfer (born 1978)

Personal information
- Full name: Scott Piercy
- Nationality: United States
- Born: November 6, 1978 (age 47) Las Vegas, Nevada, U.S.
- Height: 6 ft 0 in (1.83 m)
- Weight: 185 lb (84 kg; 13.2 st)
- Spouse: Sara
- Children: 3

Career
- Sport: Golf
- College: San Diego State University
- Turned professional: 2001
- Current tour: PGA Tour
- Former tour: Nationwide Tour
- Professional wins: 7
- Highest ranking: 25 (July 3, 2016)

Number of wins by tour
- PGA Tour: 4
- Korn Ferry Tour: 2
- Other: 1

Best results in major championships
- Masters Tournament: T29: 2016
- PGA Championship: T5: 2013
- U.S. Open: T2: 2016
- The Open Championship: CUT: 2013, 2016

Scott Piercy (born November 6, 1978) is an American professional golfer who plays on the PGA Tour.

== Early life ==
Born and raised in Las Vegas, Nevada, Piercy played college golf at San Diego State and turned professional after graduation in 2001.

== Career ==
Piercy started by playing on various mini-tours. In 2007, Piercy won the Ultimate Game at Wynn Las Vegas G&CC, earning $2 million. Piercy became a Nationwide Tour member in 2008. He won two tournaments in August and finished ninth on the money list to earn PGA Tour playing rights for 2009.

Piercy made an encouraging start to his PGA Tour career, recording five top-twenty finishes in his first six starts, and this run of form elevated Piercy into the top 100 of the Official World Golf Rankings in March 2009. He finished the season ranked 90th on the money list to retain his tour card, but slipped to 136th in 2010, and lost some of his tour status for 2011.

In 2011, Piercy won his first PGA Tour event at the Reno-Tahoe Open, an alternate event in early August. His second tour win came in July 2012 at the RBC Canadian Open, one stroke over runners-up Robert Garrigus and William McGirt. As a result, Piercy earned a place in the following week's WGC-Bridgestone Invitational and was therefore unable to defend his Reno-Tahoe Open title. In early November, he was a runner-up at the WGC-HSBC Champions in China. The Canadian Open win gained Piercy entry into the Masters in 2013, his first, and made the cut. During the 2013 season, he finished third at the Waste Management Phoenix Open, tied for fifth at the PGA Championship and Byron Nelson Championship, and reached the round of 16 at the WGC-Accenture Match Play Championship.

In the 2014 season, Piercy had an arm injury and was out for five months. In his return, he had a best result of T-12 at the Wyndham Championship.

In the 2015 season, he finished seventh at the Shriners Hospitals for Children Open, runner-up at the Sony Open in Hawaii, tenth at the Shell Houston Open. In July, he won the inaugural Barbasol Championship in Alabama, an alternate event opposite the Open Championship, for his first victory in three years. At the 2016 U.S. Open At Oakmont, Piercy finished at a tie for second, his best major finish to date. Piercy was unable to defend his title in 2016 because he earned entry into the 2016 Open Championship.

Piercy set a tournament score record through the first 54 holes at the 2022 3M Open at TPC Twin Cities in Blaine, Minnesota; however, he shot a 76 on the final round and Tony Finau took home the trophy.

== Controversy ==
In March 2020, Piercy shared a meme on his Instagram page of Pepe the Frog and Pete Buttigieg which stated "Peter pulls out early from behind." The post was considered homophobic by Queerty and ESPN, which both reported Piercy is losing multiple sponsorships, including Titleist, FootJoy, and J.Lindeberg, totaling over $2 million in lost sponsorships. Additionally, the PGA Tour stated "We were made aware of Scott's post and are disappointed in the lack of judgment used."

== Professional wins (7) ==
=== PGA Tour wins (4) ===
No.	Date	Tournament	Winning score	To par	Margin of victory	Runner(s)-up
1	Aug 7, 2011	Reno–Tahoe Open	72-70-61-70=273	−15	1 stroke	(United States) Pat Perez
2	Jul 29, 2012	RBC Canadian Open	62-67-67-67=263	−17	1 stroke	(United States) Robert Garrigus, (United States) William McGirt
3	Jul 19, 2015	Barbasol Championship	69-66-65-65=265	−19	3 strokes	(United States) Will Wilcox
4	Apr 29, 2018	Zurich Classic of New Orleans (with (United States) Billy Horschel)	65-73-61-67=266	−22	1 stroke	(United States) Jason Dufner and (United States) Pat Perez

=== Nationwide Tour wins (2) ===
No.	Date	Tournament	Winning score	To par	Margin of victory	Runners-up
1	Aug 10, 2008	Preferred Health Systems Wichita Open	64-62-65-71=262	−22	2 strokes	(United States) Hunter Haas, (United States) Spencer Levin, (United States) Daniel Summerhays
2	Aug 24, 2008	Northeast Pennsylvania Classic	66-68-69-64=267	−13	2 strokes	(Zimbabwe) Brendon de Jonge, (Australia) Cameron Percy

=== NGA Hooters Tour wins (1) ===
No.	Date	Tournament	Winning score	To par	Margin of victory	Runners-up
1	Mar 19, 2006	Michelob Ultra Classic	70-70-65-69=274	−14	1 stroke	(United States) Jeff Corr, (United States) Chris Devlin, (United States) Jered Gusso

== Results in major championships ==
Results not in chronological order in 2020.

Tournament	2008	2009	2010	2011	2012	2013	2014	2015	2016	2017	2018
Masters Tournament						T54			T29	CUT	
U.S. Open	CUT			T51	CUT	CUT			T2	CUT	T45
The Open Championship						CUT			CUT		
PGA Championship				T26	T48	T5	CUT	T48	CUT		CUT

Tournament	2019	2020
Masters Tournament		
PGA Championship	T41	CUT
U.S. Open	T52	
The Open Championship		NT

Top 10
Did not play

CUT = missed the halfway cut
"T" indicates a tie for a place.
NT = No tournament due to COVID-19 pandemic

=== Summary ===
Tournament	Wins	2nd	3rd	Top-5	Top-10	Top-25	Events	Cuts made
Masters Tournament	0	0	0	0	0	0	3	2
PGA Championship	0	0	0	1	1	1	9	5
U.S. Open	0	1	0	1	1	1	8	4
The Open Championship	0	0	0	0	0	0	2	0
Totals	0	1	0	2	2	2	22	11

- Most consecutive cuts made – 3 (2015 PGA − 2016 U.S. Open)
- Longest streak of top-10s – 1 (twice)

== Results in The Players Championship ==
Tournament	2009	2010	2011	2012	2013	2014	2015	2016	2017	2018	2019
The Players Championship	T22	CUT		CUT	CUT		CUT	T23	CUT	CUT	T56

Tournament	2020	2021	2022	2023
The Players Championship	C	T69	CUT	CUT

Did not play

CUT = missed the halfway cut
"T" indicates a tie for a place
C = Cancelled after the first round due to the COVID-19 pandemic

== Results in World Golf Championships ==
Results not in chronological order before 2015.

Tournament	2012	2013	2014	2015	2016	2017
Championship		T25			T17	T32
Match Play		R16	R64		T18	T58
Invitational	T19	T59			2	
Champions	T2	T21		T35	T63	

Top 10
Did not play

QF, R16, R32, R64 = Round in which player lost in match play
"T" = Tied

== See also ==
- 2008 Nationwide Tour graduates
