= 2011 European Tour =

Golf tour season

2011 European Tour season
- Duration: 9 December 2010 – 11 December 2011
- Number of official events: 52
- Most wins: (Denmark) Thomas Bjørn (3) (England) Luke Donald (3)
- Race to Dubai: (England) Luke Donald
- Golfer of the Year: (England) Luke Donald
- Players' Player of the Year: (England) Luke Donald
- Sir Henry Cotton Rookie of the Year: (England) Tom Lewis

The 2011 European Tour was the 40th season of the European Tour, the main professional golf tour in Europe since its inaugural season in 1972.

== Schedule ==
The following table lists official events during the 2011 season.

Date	Tournament	Host country	Purse	Winner (Note: The number in brackets after each winner's name is the number of European Tour events they had won up to and including that tournament. This information is only shown for European Tour members and are inclusive of the three United States-based major championships which were included on the schedule for the first time in 1998, with earlier editions having retrospectively been recognised as official tour wins.)	OWGR points	Other tours (Note: AFR − Sunshine Tour; ASA − Asian Tour; CHA − Challenge Tour; KOR − Korean Tour; ONE − OneAsia Tour.)	Notes
12 Dec	Alfred Dunhill Championship	South Africa	€1,000,000	(Spain) Pablo Martín (3)	20	AFR	
19 Dec	South African Open Championship	South Africa	€1,000,000	(South Africa) Ernie Els (26)	32	AFR (Note: Sunshine Tour flagship event)	
9 Jan	Africa Open	South Africa	€1,000,000	(South Africa) Louis Oosthuizen (3)	22	AFR	
16 Jan	Joburg Open	South Africa	€1,300,000	(South Africa) Charl Schwartzel (6)	20	AFR	
23 Jan	Abu Dhabi HSBC Golf Championship	UAE	US$2,700,000	(Germany) Martin Kaymer (9)	56		
30 Jan	Volvo Golf Champions	Bahrain	€1,700,000	(England) Paul Casey (11)	38		New tournament
6 Feb	Commercialbank Qatar Masters	Qatar	US$2,500,000	(Denmark) Thomas Bjørn (11)	50		
13 Feb	Omega Dubai Desert Classic	UAE	US$2,500,000	(Spain) Álvaro Quirós (5)	50		
20 Feb	Avantha Masters	India	€1,800,000	(India) Shiv Chawrasia (2)	20	ASA	
27 Feb	WGC-Accenture Match Play Championship	United States	US$8,500,000	(England) Luke Donald (4)	76		World Golf Championship
13 Mar	WGC-Cadillac Championship	United States	US$8,500,000	(United States) Nick Watney (n/a)	74		World Golf Championship
21 Mar	Sicilian Open	Italy	€1,000,000	(France) Raphaël Jacquelin (3)	24		New tournament
27 Mar	Open de Andalucía de Golf	Spain	€1,000,000	(Scotland) Paul Lawrie (6)	24		
3 Apr	Trophée Hassan II	Morocco	€1,500,000	(England) David Horsey (2)	24		
10 Apr	Masters Tournament	United States	US$8,000,000	(South Africa) Charl Schwartzel (7)	100		Major championship
17 Apr	Maybank Malaysian Open	Malaysia	US$2,500,000	(Italy) Matteo Manassero (2)	42	ASA	
24 Apr	Volvo China Open	China	CN¥20,000,000	(Belgium) Nicolas Colsaerts (1)	28	ONE	
1 May	Ballantine's Championship	South Korea	€2,205,000	(England) Lee Westwood (21)	42	ASA, KOR	
8 May	Open de España	Spain	€2,000,000	(South Africa) Thomas Aiken (1)	24		
15 May	Iberdrola Open	Spain	€1,000,000	(Northern Ireland) Darren Clarke (13)	24		
22 May	Volvo World Match Play Championship	Spain	€3,400,000	(England) Ian Poulter (11)	52		Limited-field event
22 May	Madeira Islands Open	Portugal	€700,000	(Northern Ireland) Michael Hoey (2)	18	CHA	
29 May	BMW PGA Championship	England	€4,500,000	(England) Luke Donald (5)	64		Flagship event
5 Jun	Saab Wales Open	Wales	£1,800,000	(Sweden) Alex Norén (2)	30		
12 Jun	BMW Italian Open	Italy	€1,500,000	(England) Robert Rock (1)	24		
19 Jun	U.S. Open	United States	US$7,850,000	(Northern Ireland) Rory McIlroy (2)	100		Major championship
19 Jun	Saint-Omer Open	France	€600,000	(Australia) Matthew Zions (1)	18	CHA	
26 Jun	BMW International Open	Germany	€2,000,000	(Spain) Pablo Larrazábal (2)	38		
3 Jul	Alstom Open de France	France	€3,000,000	(France) Thomas Levet (6)	40		
10 Jul	Barclays Scottish Open	Scotland	£3,000,000	(England) Luke Donald (6)	52		
17 Jul	The Open Championship	England	£5,000,000	(Northern Ireland) Darren Clarke (14)	100		Major championship
24 Jul	Nordea Masters	Sweden	€1,500,000	(Sweden) Alex Norén (3)	24		
31 Jul	Irish Open	Ireland	€1,500,000	(England) Simon Dyson (5)	28		
7 Aug	WGC-Bridgestone Invitational	United States	US$8,500,000	(Australia) Adam Scott (8)	76		World Golf Championship
14 Aug	PGA Championship	United States	US$8,000,000	(United States) Keegan Bradley (n/a)	100		Major championship
21 Aug	Czech Open	Czech Republic	€1,500,000	(England) Oliver Fisher (1)	24		
28 Aug	Johnnie Walker Championship at Gleneagles	Scotland	£1,400,000	(Denmark) Thomas Bjørn (12)	24		
4 Sep	Omega European Masters	Switzerland	€2,000,000	(Denmark) Thomas Bjørn (13)	44	ASA	
11 Sep	KLM Open	Netherlands	€1,800,000	(England) Simon Dyson (6)	40		
25 Sep	Austrian Golf Open	Austria	€1,000,000	(England) Kenneth Ferrie (3)	24		
2 Oct	Alfred Dunhill Links Championship	Scotland	US$5,000,000	(Northern Ireland) Michael Hoey (3)	54		Pro-Am
9 Oct	Bankia Madrid Masters	Spain	€1,000,000	(England) Lee Slattery (1)	28		
16 Oct	Portugal Masters	Portugal	€2,500,000	(England) Tom Lewis (1)	34		
23 Oct	Castelló Masters	Spain	€2,000,000	(Spain) Sergio García (9)	24		
30 Oct	Andalucía Masters	Spain	€3,000,000	(Spain) Sergio García (10)	38		
6 Nov	WGC-HSBC Champions	China	US$7,000,000	(Germany) Martin Kaymer (10)	62		World Golf Championship
14 Nov	Barclays Singapore Open	Singapore	US$6,000,000	(Spain) Gonzalo Fernández-Castaño (5)	46	ASA	
20 Nov	Iskandar Johor Open	Malaysia	US$2,000,000	(Netherlands) Joost Luiten (1)	24	ASA	New to European Tour
20 Nov	Alfred Dunhill Championship	South Africa	€1,000,000	(South Africa) Garth Mulroy (1)	20	AFR	
27 Nov	SA Open Championship	South Africa	€1,000,000	(South Africa) Hennie Otto (2)	32	AFR	
4 Dec	UBS Hong Kong Open	Hong Kong	US$2,750,000	(Northern Ireland) Rory McIlroy (3)	38	ASA	
11 Dec	Dubai World Championship	UAE	US$7,500,000	(Spain) Álvaro Quirós (6)	58		Tour Championship

=== Unofficial events ===
The following events were sanctioned by the European Tour, but did not carry official money, nor were wins official.

Date	Tournament	Host country	Purse	Winners	OWGR points	Notes
18 Sep	Vivendi Seve Trophy	France	n/a	Team GB&I	n/a	Team event
27 Nov	Omega Mission Hills World Cup	China	US$7,500,000	(United States) Matt Kuchar and (United States) Gary Woodland	n/a	Team event

== Location of tournaments ==
Location of official tournaments of the 2011 European Tour in Europe.
Major Championship
Flagship event
Regular event
Location of official tournaments of the 2011 European Tour outside Europe.
Major Championship
World Golf Championship
Tour Championship
Regular event

South Africa
United Arab Emirates

== Race to Dubai ==
The Race to Dubai was based on prize money won during the season, calculated in Euros.

Pos.	Player	Majors				WGCs				Principal events		Top 10s in other ET events								Tmts	Money		
Pos.	Player	Mas	USO	Opn	PGA	WGC MP	WGC Cad	WGC Inv	WGC Cha	BMW PGA	Dub	1	2	3	4	5	6	7	8	Tmts	Reg. (€)	Bon. ($)	Total (€)
1	(England) Donald	T4	T45	CUT	T8	1st	T6	T2	•	1st	3rd	2nd	1st	T9						13	4,216,226	1,500,000	5,323,400
2	(Northern Ireland) McIlroy	T15	1st	T25	T64	T17	T10	T6	T4	T24	T11	2nd	T10	3rd	T9	T3	3rd	2nd	1st	19	3,171,787	1,125,000	4,002,168
3	(Germany) Kaymer	CUT	T39	T12	CUT	2nd	T24	T29	1st	T31	T11	1st	T9	T3	4th	2nd	T8			22	2,935,446	750,000	3,489,033
4	(South Africa) Schwartzel	1st	T9	T16	T12	T17	T24	T53	T4	CUT	5th	T2	4th	T4	1st	T8	T5	T9		18	2,486,959	600,000	2,929,829
5	(England) Westwood	T11	T3	CUT	T8	T17	T18	T9	T29	2nd		1st	T9	T6	5th					19	2,052,090	525,000	2,439,601
6	(Spain) Quirós	T27	T54	CUT	CUT	T33	T64	T53	T49	T18	1st	T8	2nd	1st	T5	T7				23	1,927,090	450,000	2,259,242
7	(Denmark) A. Hansen	CUT	•	T22	T3	T33	T3	T29	T11	T18	T44	T2	2nd	T2						22	1,769,893	412,500	2,074,366
8	(Spain) García	T35	T7	T9	T12	•	•	T53	•	•	T11	T9	2nd	1st	1st					13	1,685,930	375,000	1,962,723
9	(Denmark) Bjørn	•	•	4th	CUT	•	•	T68	T42	•	T29	1st	1st	1st	T8					23	1,565,001	337,500	1,814,115
10	(England) Dyson	•	•	T9	T51	•	•	T33	T16	3rd	T46	T5	7th	T5	1st	1st	T9			29	1,473,344	300,000	1,694,779
11	(Northern Ireland) Clarke	•	•	1st	CUT	•	•	T68	T38	T45	57th	T8	1st							22	1,396,659	262,500	1,590,415
12	(Spain) Jiménez	T27	CUT	T25	T64	T5	T55	72nd	T38	CUT	T44	T2	2nd	T9	2nd					29	1,390,539	243,750	1,570,454
13	(Sweden) Hanson	CUT	T7	CUT	T64	T33	T55	T21	T33	T18	4th	T2	9th	T4	T10	T9	T6	T10	3rd	24	1,334,514	225,000	1,500,590
14	(Sweden) Norén	•	T51	CUT	T34	•	•	T53	T49	CUT	T37	T8	T4	T5	1st	1st	T9	T3		28	1,274,018	206,250	1,427,643
15	(South Africa) Oosthuizen	CUT	T9	T54	CUT	T33	T18	T37	T7	CUT	T6	3rd	1st	T5	T3	T8				22	1,270,730	187,500	1,409,126

Win
Top 10
Made cut
Missed cut
• Did not play

== Awards ==
Award	Winner	Ref.
Golfer of the Year	(England) Luke Donald	
Players' Player of the Year	(England) Luke Donald	
Sir Henry Cotton Rookie of the Year	(England) Tom Lewis	

== See also ==
- 2011 in golf
- 2011 European Senior Tour
