= 2016 WGC-Cadillac Championship =

Coordinates: 25.815°N 80.340°W

Tournament information
- Dates: March 3–6, 2016
- Location: Doral, Florida, U.S.
- Course(s): Trump National Doral; Blue Monster Course
- Tour(s): PGA Tour; European Tour

Statistics
- Par: 72
- Length: 7,528 yards (6,884 m)
- Field: 66 players
- Cut: None
- Prize fund: $9,500,000 €8,583,303
- Winner's share: $1,620,000 €1,463,679

Champion
- (Australia) Adam Scott
- 276 (−12)

Location in the United States
Location in Florida

The 2016 WGC-Cadillac Championship was a golf tournament which was played March 3–6 on the TPC Blue Monster course at Trump National Doral in Doral, Florida, a suburb west of Miami. It was the 17th WGC-Cadillac Championship tournament, the first of the World Golf Championships events in 2016, the 55th PGA Tour event at Doral, and the final edition of the tournament played in Doral. The tournament was won by Adam Scott. The PGA Tour would not return to Doral until 2026.

== Course layout ==
The tournament was played on the TPC Blue Monster course.

Hole	1	2	3	4	5	6	7	8	9	Out	10	11	12	13	14	15	16	17	18	In	Total
Yards	590	448	436	227	421	432	471	549	200	3,774	614	422	601	238	484	153	341	425	476	3,754	7,528
Par	5	4	4	3	4	4	4	5	3	36	5	4	5	3	4	3	4	4	4	36	72

== Field ==
The field consisted of players from the top of the Official World Golf Ranking and the money lists/Orders of Merit from the six main professional golf tours. Each player is classified according to the first category in which he qualified, but other categories are shown in parentheses.

Five players made their WGC debut: Kristoffer Broberg, Nathan Holman, Smylie Kaufman, Yūsaku Miyazato, and Jordan Zunic.

1. The top 30 players from the final 2015 FedExCup Points List

Daniel Berger, Steven Bowditch, Paul Casey (7,9), Jason Day (7,9), Harris English, Rickie Fowler (7,9), Bill Haas (7,9), Charley Hoffman, J. B. Holmes (7,9), Dustin Johnson (7,9), Zach Johnson (7,9), Kevin Kisner (7,9,10), Brooks Koepka (7,9), Matt Kuchar (7,9), Danny Lee (7,9), Hideki Matsuyama (7,9), Rory McIlroy (2,7.9), Kevin Na (7,9,10), Louis Oosthuizen (2,7,9), Scott Piercy (7,9), Patrick Reed (2,7,9), Justin Rose (2,7,9), Brandt Snedeker (7,9,10), Jordan Spieth (7,9), Henrik Stenson (2,7,8,9), Robert Streb (7,9), Jimmy Walker (7,9), Bubba Watson (7,9)

- Bae Sang-moon was unable to compete due to a military obligation in South Korea.
- Jim Furyk (7,9) was unable to compete due to wrist surgery.

2. The top 20 players from the final 2015 European Tour Race to Dubai

An Byeong-hun (7,8,9), Kiradech Aphibarnrat (7,9), Kristoffer Broberg, Victor Dubuisson (7,9), Ross Fisher, Matt Fitzpatrick (7,9), Branden Grace (7,8,9), Søren Kjeldsen (7,9), Anirban Lahiri (6,7,9), Shane Lowry (7,9), Andy Sullivan (7,8,9), Bernd Wiesberger (7,9), Danny Willett (7,8,9), Chris Wood (7,8,9)

- Thongchai Jaidee (7,9) did not play.

3. The top 2 players from the final 2015 Japan Golf Tour Order of Merit

Kim Kyung-tae, Yūsaku Miyazato

4. The top 2 players from the final 2015 PGA Tour of Australasia Order of Merit

Nathan Holman (8), Jordan Zunic

5. The top 2 players from the final 2015 Sunshine Tour Order of Merit

George Coetzee, Charl Schwartzel (7,8,9)

6. The top 2 players from the final 2015 Asian Tour Order of Merit

Scott Hend

7. The top 50 players from the Official World Golf Ranking, as of February 22, 2016

Jamie Donaldson, Sergio García (9), Emiliano Grillo (9), Billy Horschel (9), Martin Kaymer (9), Russell Knox (9,10), Marc Leishman (9), David Lingmerth (9), Phil Mickelson (9), Adam Scott (9,10), Justin Thomas (9,10)

8. The top 10 players from the 2016 European Tour Race to Dubai, as of February 22, 2016

Rafa Cabrera-Bello, Marcus Fraser

9. The top 50 players from the Official World Golf Ranking, as of February 29, 2016

- Jaco van Zyl did not play.

10. The top 10 players from the 2016 FedExCup Points List, as of February 29, 2016

Jason Dufner, Fabián Gómez, Smylie Kaufman, Graeme McDowell

== Round summaries ==
=== First round ===
Thursday, March 3, 2016

Marcus Fraser and Scott Piercy shot rounds of 66 (−6) to take a one-shot lead over Phil Mickelson.

Place	Player	Score	To par
T1	(Australia) Marcus Fraser	66	−6
T1	(United States) Scott Piercy	66	−6
3	(United States) Phil Mickelson	67	−5
T4	(United States) Jason Dufner	68	−4
T4	(United States) Charley Hoffman	68	−4
T4	(Australia) Adam Scott	68	−4
T4	(England) Danny Willett	68	−4
T8	(United States) Jordan Spieth	69	−3
T8	(United States) Jimmy Walker	69	−3
T8	(United States) Bubba Watson	69	−3

=== Second round ===
Friday, March 4, 2016

Adam Scott shot a 66 (−6) to take a two-stroke lead over Dustin Johnson and Rory McIlroy. Johnson, the defending champion, shot the low round of the day, an 8-under-par 64. First round co-leaders Marcus Fraser and Scott Piercy both shot 77 to fall down the leaderboard.

Place	Player	Score	To par
1	(Australia) Adam Scott	68-66=134	−10
T2	(United States) Dustin Johnson	72-64=136	−8
T2	(Northern Ireland) Rory McIlroy	71-65=136	−8
4	(England) Danny Willett	68-69=137	−7
T5	(United States) Charley Hoffman	68-70=138	−6
T5	(United States) Bubba Watson	69-69=138	−6
T7	(England) Paul Casey	71-68=139	−5
T7	(United States) Phil Mickelson	67-72=139	−5
T9	(United States) Jason Dufner	68-72=140	−4
T9	(India) Anirban Lahiri	70-70=140	−4
T9	(South Africa) Charl Schwartzel	73-67=140	−4

=== Third round ===
Saturday, March 5, 2016

Rory McIlroy took a three-stroke lead over Dustin Johnson and Adam Scott by shooting at 4-under-par 68.

Place	Player	Score	To par
1	(Northern Ireland) Rory McIlroy	71-65-68=204	−12
T2	(United States) Dustin Johnson	72-64-71=207	−9
T2	(Australia) Adam Scott	68-66-73=207	−9
T4	(United States) Phil Mickelson	67-72-70=209	−7
T4	(United States) Bubba Watson	69-69-71=209	−7
T4	(England) Danny Willett	68-69-72=209	−7
T7	(Spain) Rafa Cabrera-Bello	73-71-67=211	−5
T7	(Spain) Sergio García	73-71-67=211	−5
T7	(India) Anirban Lahiri	70-70-71=211	−5
T10	(United States) Harris English	71-70-71=212	−4
T10	(United States) Rickie Fowler	70-71-71=212	−4
T10	(United States) Charley Hoffman	68-70-74=212	−4
T10	(United States) Smylie Kaufman	71-70-71=212	−4
T10	(South Africa) Charl Schwartzel	73-67-72=212	−4

=== Final round ===
Sunday, March 6, 2016

Adam Scott recovered from two double bogeys in his first five holes with six birdies the rest of the round to prevail by one stroke over Bubba Watson. Rory McIlroy entered the round with a three-stroke lead but recorded three bogeys and failed to make birdie until the 16th to finish two shots behind Scott. The victory was Scott's second consecutive win on the PGA Tour, having won The Honda Classic the week before.

Place	Player	Score	To par	Money ($)
1	(Australia) Adam Scott	68-66-73-69=276	−12	1,620,000
2	(United States) Bubba Watson	69-69-71-68=277	−11	1,018,000
T3	(Northern Ireland) Rory McIlroy	71-65-68-74=278	−10	483,000
T3	(England) Danny Willett	68-69-72-69=278	−10	483,000
5	(United States) Phil Mickelson	67-72-70-70=279	−9	342,000
6	(United States) Jimmy Walker	69-72-73-66=280	−8	280,000
7	(England) Paul Casey	71-68-75-68=282	−6	240,000
T8	(United States) Rickie Fowler	70-71-71-71=283	−5	197,500
T8	(United States) Smylie Kaufman	71-70-71-71=283	−5	197,500
10	(United States) Harris English	71-70-71-72=284	−4	165,000

==== Scorecard ====
Eagle	Birdie	Bogey	Double bogey

Final round

Hole	1	2	3	4	5	6	7	8	9	10	11	12	13	14	15	16	17	18
Par	5	4	4	3	4	4	4	5	3	5	4	5	3	4	3	4	4	4
(Australia) Scott	−10	−10	−8	−8	−6	−7	−7	−8	−8	−9	−10	−11	−11	−12	−12	−12	−12	−12
(United States) Watson	−8	−8	−8	−8	−8	−8	−8	−10	−10	−10	−10	−11	−11	−10	−10	−10	−11	−11
(Northern Ireland) McIlroy	−12	−12	−12	−12	−12	−12	−11	−11	−10	−10	−10	−10	−9	−9	−9	−10	−10	−10
(England) Willett	−8	−8	−8	−8	−8	−8	−9	−9	−10	−10	−9	−10	−10	−10	−10	−11	−11	−10
(United States) Mickelson	−8	−8	−8	−8	−8	−8	−8	−9	−10	−9	−9	−9	−9	−9	−9	−10	−10	−9
(United States) Johnson	−9	−9	−7	−7	−7	−7	−7	−8	−8	−6	−4	−3	−1	−1	−1	−2	−2	−2
