= Open de Andalucía =

Open de Andalucia
Tournament information
- Location: Andalusia, Spain
- Established: 2007
- Course: Aloha Golf Club
- Par: 72
- Length: 6,881 yards (6,292 m)
- Tour: European Tour
- Format: Stroke play
- Prize fund: €1,000,000
- Month played: March
- Final year: 2012

Tournament record score
- Aggregate: 263 Louis Oosthuizen (2010)
- To par: −20 Lee Westwood (2007)

Final champion
- (France) Julien Quesne
- Location in Spain Location in Andalusia

The Open de Andalucia was a European Tour men's professional golf tournament which was played from 2007 to 2012. The event was held in the Andalusia region of Spain.

== History ==
Between 1992 and 1995, and again in 1999, former European Tour event, the Turespana Masters, was held in the Andalusia region and titled as the Turespana Masters Open de Andalucia, with winners including future major champion and World Number 1 Vijay Singh, and local favourite Miguel Ángel Jiménez.

This incarnation of the Open de Andalucia owes its origins indirectly to the PGA Tour's decision to reschedule The Players Championship from March to May. In response, the European Tour decided to move the British Masters, which is one of its higher profile tournaments, from that same week in May to a September slot when more top players would be available. The Valle Romano Open de Andalucia was created to fill the gap in the schedule this move created. It has been promoted by the personal companies of the Spanish European Tour members Miguel Ángel Jiménez and Gonzalo Fernández-Castaño.

The first two events were staged at the Aloha Golf Club near Marbella, before the tournament was moved to the Real Club de Golf de Sevilla near Seville for the 2009 season at the request of sponsors.

At the 2009 Open de Andalucia, European Ryder Cup veteran Colin Montgomerie became the 18th player to reach the 500 appearance mark on the European Tour. He started the tournament impressively with a five under par 67, for a share of second place after the first round. His challenge faded however, and he finished tied for 31st place at level-par, 14 strokes behind the winner, Søren Kjeldsen of Denmark. Kjeldsen had broken the course record with a 10-under-par 62 on Saturday to move into the lead, and a level-par final round of 72 on Sunday was enough to see off the challenge of Scot David Drysdale by three strokes.

== Winners ==
Year	Winner	Score	To par	Margin of victory	Runner(s)-up	Winner's share (€)	Venue
Open de Andalucía Costa del Sol
2012	(France) Julien Quesne	271	−17	2 strokes	(Italy) Matteo Manassero	166,660	Aloha
Open de Andalucía de Golf
2011	(Scotland) Paul Lawrie	268	−12	1 stroke	(Sweden) Johan Edfors	166,660	Parador de Málaga Golf
2010	(South Africa) Louis Oosthuizen	263	−17	3 strokes	(England) Richard Finch (Scotland) Peter Whiteford	166,660	Parador de Málaga Golf
Open de Andalucía
2009	(Denmark) Søren Kjeldsen	274	−14	3 strokes	(Scotland) David Drysdale	166,660	Real Club de Golf de Sevilla
MAPFRE Open de Andalucía
2008	(France) Thomas Levet	272	−16	Playoff	(England) Oliver Fisher	166,660	Aloha
Valle Romano Open de Andalucía
2007	(England) Lee Westwood	268	−20	2 strokes	(Sweden) Fredrik Andersson Hed (England) Phillip Archer	166,660	Aloha
