= Adam Scott (golfer) =

Australian golfer (born 1980)

Adam Scott AM
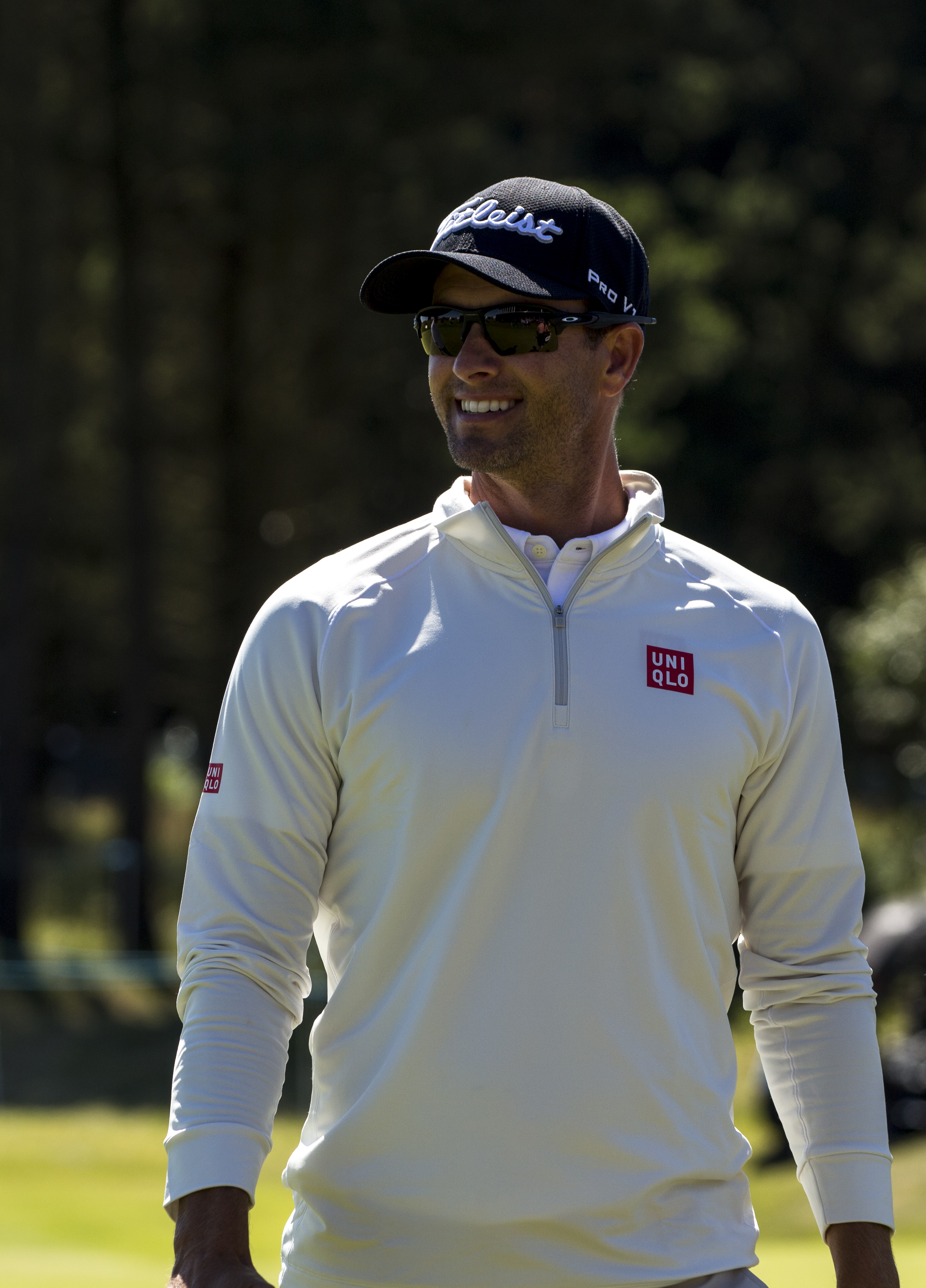
- Scott in 2017

Personal information
- Full name: Adam Derek Scott
- Nicknames: Scotty, The Big Queenslander
- Nationality: Australia
- Born: 16 July 1980 (age 46) Adelaide, Australia
- Height: 6 ft 0 in (183 cm)
- Weight: 180 lb (82 kg)
- Spouse: Marie Kojzar (m. 2014)
- Children: 3

Career
- Sport: Golf
- College: University of Nevada, Las Vegas (UNLV)
- Turned professional: 2000
- Current tours: PGA Tour; European Tour; PGA Tour of Australasia
- Professional wins: 33
- Highest ranking: 1 (18 May 2014) (11 weeks)

Number of wins by tour
- PGA Tour: 14
- European Tour: 11
- Asian Tour: 4
- Sunshine Tour: 1
- PGA Tour of Australasia: 6
- Other: 5

Best results in major championships (wins: 1)
- Masters Tournament: Won: 2013
- PGA Championship: 3rd/T3: 2006, 2018
- U.S. Open: T4: 2015
- The Open Championship: 2nd: 2012

Achievements and awards
- PGA Tour of Australasia Order of Merit winner: 2005, 2013

Adam Derek Scott (born 16 July 1980) is an Australian professional golfer who plays on the PGA Tour. He is a former world number one in the Official World Golf Ranking. He has won one major championship, the 2013 Masters Tournament.

After winning the Australian Boys' Amateur in 1997 and 1998, Scott attended the University of Nevada, Las Vegas, where he played for the UNLV Rebels until he turned professional in 2000. He soon earned membership on the European Tour and within three years he had won four European Tour events. Aged 23, Scott won the 2004 Players Championship, the flagship event on the PGA Tour, and afterwards played primarily in the United States. He won the Tour Championship in 2006 and rose into the top five of the Official World Golf Ranking. He suffered a slump in 2009 and fell outside the top 50 of the world rankings until winning the Australian Open.

Scott moved back into the top 10 of the world rankings by winning the 2011 WGC-Bridgestone Invitational, and finished runner-up at the 2012 Open Championship. Scott won his first major championship at the 2013 Masters Tournament, making him the first Australian to earn a green jacket. In 2014, he overtook Tiger Woods to reach the number one position in the Official World Golf Ranking, a position he held for 11 weeks. Scott has had enduring success since; as of 2025, he has a total of 32 worldwide wins, including 14 on the PGA Tour. He has also made twelve consecutive appearances with the international team at the Presidents Cup from 2003 to 2026

== Early life ==
Scott was born in Adelaide, South Australia on 16 July 1980, to Pam and Phil Scott. Phil was introduced to golf at age 14 while visiting his relatives in Wales. He played alongside a cousin at Ashburnham Golf Club in Burry Port and continued to play golf when he returned to Australia. Phil had aspired to become a professional golfer, but suffered a career-ending injury while riding a motorbike aged 19. He then became a club professional and later a golf course designer. He introduced Adam to the game at a young age by giving him a plastic set of clubs, and regularly took him to the North Adelaide Par-3 course.

Scott attended the Lady George Kindergarten in Adelaide and moved with his family at the age of nine to Sunshine Coast, Queensland, where he attended Matthew Flinders Anglican College. They then settled on the Gold Coast, Queensland in 1993 when Scott was 12 years of age. Initially at The Southport School, an Anglican boys' school on the Gold Coast, he completed his high school education at The Kooralbyn International School, located in the Gold Coast hinterland, where he undertook extra subjects in golf. Alongside golf, Scott played football, cricket, handball, and tennis during his youth. He was selected as a member of the Golf Australia National Squad. Scott was coached by his father until age 19, when he began to work with Butch Harmon.

== Amateur career ==
Scott won the Australian Boys' Amateur in 1997 and 1998. He was also a member of the Golf Australia National Squad. Scott later attended the University of Nevada, Las Vegas (UNLV) in the United States, where he played for the UNLV Rebels golf team. Scott stated that he chose to attend UNLV because he was impressed by the school's brochure, stating: "I literally picked the one with the best‑looking prospectus, and that was UNLV. They had a really beautiful glossy magazine about their golf program. I didn't visit or anything, so I didn't really know." At UNLV, he was teammates with future PGA Tour player Charley Hoffman, who mentored him.

== Professional career ==
=== European Tour ===
Scott turned professional midway through the 2000 season. He earned his card for the 2001 European Tour season in just eight starts as a professional, his best result being a tie for sixth at the Linde German Masters. Scott also made a handful of appearances on the PGA Tour but made only one cut in six events.

In Scott's first full year as a professional golfer he won the European Tour's Alfred Dunhill Championship in Johannesburg, South Africa for his first professional title. This event was Scott's first start of the year and was co-sanctioned by the European and Sunshine Tours. He beat Justin Rose to the title by one stroke. Scott had three other top-3 finishes throughout the season and went on to finish 13th in the Order of Merit in his first season.

The following year in 2002, Scott had two victories on the European Tour and a final position of seventh on the Order of Merit. His first win of the year was a six-shot victory at the Qatar Masters. Later in the year, Scott won the Gleneagles Scottish PGA Championship, shooting a final round of 63 to win by ten shots. In between these victories, Scott made his debut at the Masters Tournament, where he finished tied for 9th.

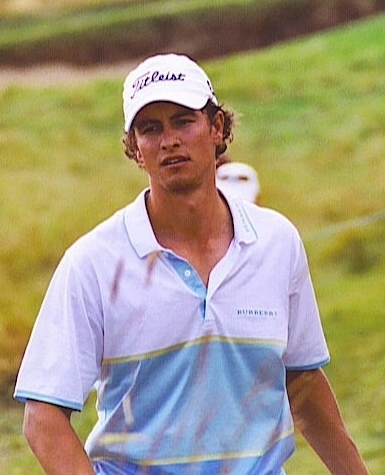
Scott in 2004

In 2003, Scott made it to the semifinals of the WGC-Accenture Match Play Championship, but fell to eventual champion Tiger Woods on the 19th hole. He had previously beaten Bernhard Langer, Rocco Mediate, Kevin Sutherland, and Jay Haas en route to the semis, then defeated fellow Australian Peter Lonard 1 up in the consolation match. In August 2003, Scott won his fourth European Tour title at the Scandinavian Masters by two strokes over Nick Dougherty. A month later he followed it up with his first victory on the PGA Tour at the inaugural Deutsche Bank Championship. The win came in his 34th career start on the PGA Tour. He shot a course record 62 in the second round to lead by two at the halfway stage and went on to win by four from Rocco Mediate. At the end of the year he made his first appearance on the International team at the Presidents Cup in South Africa, contributing three points out of five, en route to a 17–17 tie.

Scott won the flagship event of the tour, The Players Championship; He had a two-stroke lead on the 72nd tee, but found the water hazard with his approach to the green. However, he sealed the title with a 40-yard up and down, which included a ten-footer for bogey to win by a shot over runner-up Pádraig Harrington. He became the youngest winner of The Players Championship at 23 years old. Three months later, Scott collected this third PGA Tour win, with victory at the Booz Allen Classic. He equalled the tournament total record at 21-under-par to win by four from Charles Howell III.

Early in 2005 he won the Nissan Open, but as the tournament was shortened to 36 holes due to heavy rain, it is not recognised as an official victory. Sharing the halfway lead with Chad Campbell, they played off to determine the winner, with Scott winning on the first playoff hole. Thus, he reached the top ten of the Official World Golf Rankings for the first time in his career. He has since spent over 400 weeks in the top-10 of the rankings. Several months later, Scott won his fifth European Tour title with victory at the Johnnie Walker Classic in Beijing, China. He shot a course record 63 on the way to a three-shot victory. Scott also won the Singapore Open later in 2005 on the Asian Tour by seven strokes over Lee Westwood.

=== PGA Tour ===
Scott played less frequently on the European Tour from 2006 onwards, focusing more on the PGA Tour. He had a successful year, recording one victory alongside three runners up finishes and three-third places. He finished tied third at the PGA Championship, which was his best showing at a major championship. He then went on later in the year to finish tied second at the WGC-American Express Championship, finishing eight strokes behind Tiger Woods. At the end of the year, Scott won the season-ending Tour Championship by three strokes for his fourth career PGA Tour win and finished third on the PGA Tour money list for 2006.

The 2007 season started for Scott with a second-place finish at the season opening Mercedes Benz Championship in Hawaii behind Vijay Singh. After this, Scott reached his career high ranking of world number three. He then won for the fifth time on the PGA Tour, the week before the Masters, at the Shell Houston Open. After hitting his tee shot into the water on the 72nd hole, he made a 48-foot par putt to seal a three stroke victory over Stuart Appleby and Bubba Watson. He then played consistently for the rest of the year, qualifying for all four FedEx Cup playoff events and finishing 10th in the final standings.

In 2008, he played enough events on the European Tour to qualify for playing on the Order of Merit for the first time since 2005. Scott endured a somewhat difficult season in 2008 with injury and illness, but he managed to win once on each tour. In January 2008 he started off the year in fine style by winning his sixth career title on the European Tour at the Qatar Masters. Scott carded a 11-under-par final round of 61, which was both a course record and personal best round. He started his final round three shots behind the overnight leader and won the tournament by finishing three shots ahead of Henrik Stenson.

In April 2008, Scott won the EDS Byron Nelson Championship in a playoff against Ryan Moore. Scott holed a nine-foot putt to make the playoff on the 72nd hole. The playoff started with Moore and Scott making pars on the first two extra holes before Scott holed a dramatic 48-foot birdie putt at the third extra hole for the victory. At the 2008 U.S. Open, World No. 1 Tiger Woods, World No. 2 Phil Mickelson and World No. 3 Scott were all paired together in the first two rounds of the tournament. Woods won in a playoff, Mickelson finished in 18th, and Scott finished in 26th. He ended the year 39th on the money list. Scott's form dipped badly in 2009 as he dropped out of the top 50 in the world rankings and finished the year outside of the top 100 on the PGA Tour money list. He finished 108th on the money list which is his worst ever placing in his career. In 19 events on the PGA Tour, he missed the cut 10 times, with his only top 10 finish coming at the Sony Open in Hawaii in January. He did however win at the end of year in December at his home championship, the Australian Open, for his first victory on home soil in his career. In 2016 he described this as being one of the most important wins of his career, as it kickstarted his career back in the right direction.

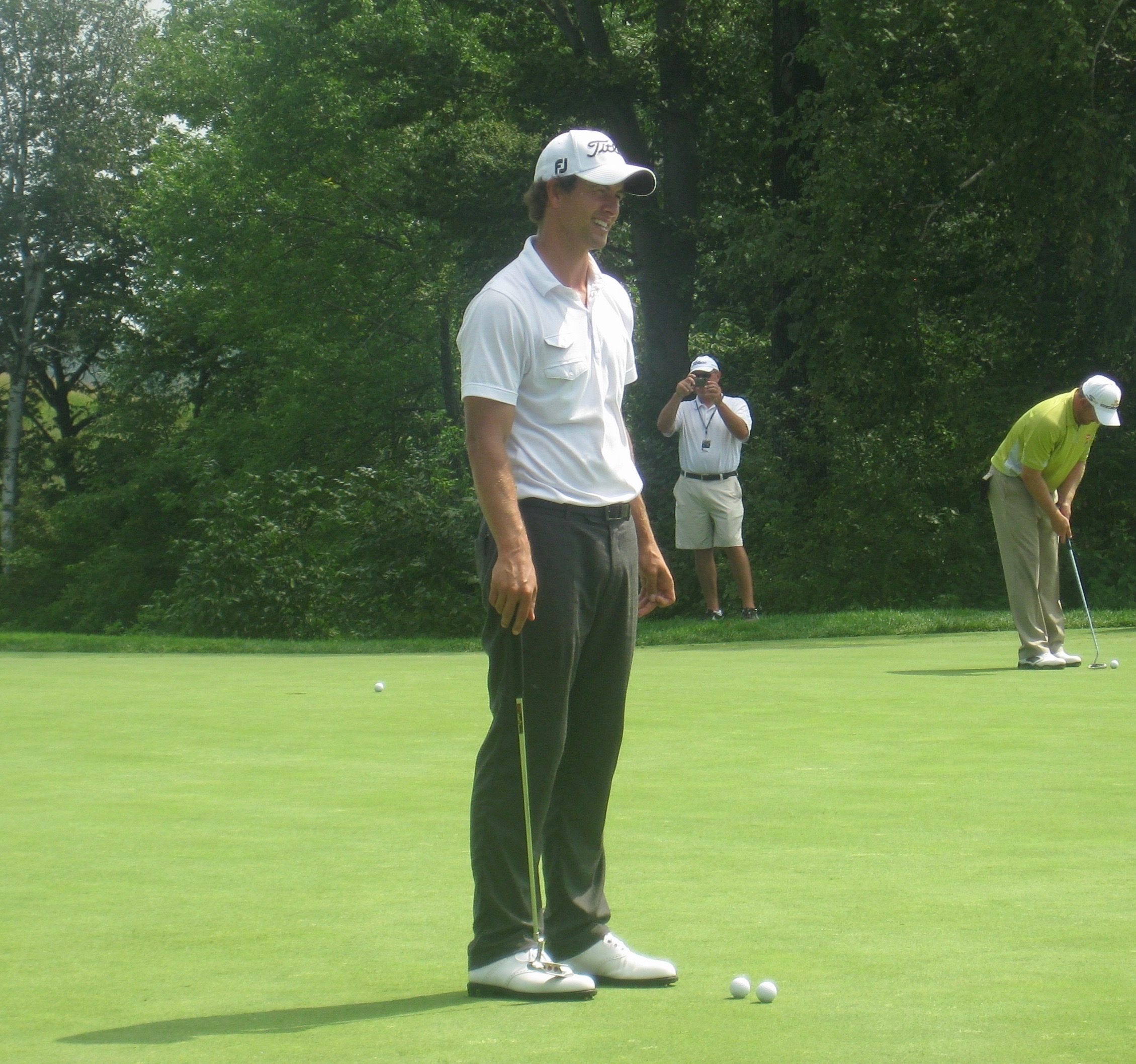
Scott at the 2010 PGA Championship

Despite a quiet couple of years Scott won his seventh career PGA Tour title at the Valero Texas Open in May 2010, prevailing in a 36 hole long Sunday to finish one stroke ahead of Swede Freddie Jacobson. It was Scott's first PGA Tour victory for two years. He qualified and played in all the FedEx Cup playoffs, finishing 27th at the Tour Championship. In November, Scott won the Barclays Singapore Open for the third time in his career, having previously triumphed in 2005 and 2006. It was also his seventh title on the European Tour.

Scott achieved his best finish at a major championship when he finished in a tie for second place at the 2011 Masters Tournament alongside compatriot Jason Day, two strokes behind the winner Charl Schwartzel. Scott had held the sole lead of the tournament while playing the 71st hole, but four birdies in a row from Schwartzel meant Scott fell short by two strokes.

With Tiger Woods injured at the U.S. Open, and The Open Championship in 2011, Woods's caddie Steve Williams caddied for Scott. After Woods fired Williams on 20 July, Williams became Scott's permanent caddie. The two enjoyed their first win together on 7 August 2011 when Scott triumphed at the 2011 WGC-Bridgestone Invitational, earning him his first career World Golf Championship and eighth title overall on both of the main tours. He beat Luke Donald and Rickie Fowler by four strokes after a bogey-free final round of 65, becoming the 20th different player to win a World Golf Championship event. Scott returned to the world's top 10 for the first time in over two years after his win, re-entering at ninth.

In attempting to become the first player to win a major the week after winning a tour event since Tiger Woods in 2007, Scott finished tied seventh at the PGA Championship. Scott was one of six players to post two top 10 finishes at majors in 2011. He then held the 36 hole lead at the season ending Tour Championship, before rounds of 74-68 led to a tied sixth finish. Scott ended the year number 16 in the standings. In November 2011, Scott was one of five Australians in the President's Cup team that lost to the United States in Australia. Scott ended with a 2–3–0 record.

Scott started the year at the Northern Trust Open, where he finished in a tie for 17th. In April, Scott enjoyed his second consecutive top-10 at the Masters Tournament when he finished T8th. He shot a final round 66, which included a hole-in-one at the 16th hole, to advance up the leaderboard on the final day. In the years second major championship, Scott had his best result at the U.S. Open with a tie for 15th at the Olympic Club. He shot three consecutive rounds of 70 in rounds two, three and four. Then in the build-up to The Open Championship, Scott finished in third at the AT&T National.

At the 2012 Open Championship, Scott equalled the course record for Royal Lytham & St Annes Golf Club at an Open Championship when he shot a six-under-par round of 64 to lead by one stroke after the first round. This was then matched by American Brandt Snedeker in the second round, to lead Scott by one stroke going into the weekend after Scott had recorded a round of 67. In the third round, Scott shot a 68 to take a four stroke lead into the final round, ahead of Brandt Snedeker and Graeme McDowell.

In the final round, Scott's birdie on the 14th gave him a cushion of four shots with four holes to play. On the 15th, Scott made bogey after he pulled his approach shot into a greenside bunker. At the 16th he overhit his approach shot onto the back of the green to leave a lengthy putt for birdie. He missed the putt by about five feet and could not convert the par putt. As Scott was playing the 17th, Ernie Els had birdied the final hole to become the leader in the clubhouse at seven under, one shot behind Scott. On the 17th, from the middle of the fairway, Scott overhit his approach shot and landed in some thick rough at the back of the green. He could only pitch out to 20 feet away and missed the resulting putt to record his third bogey and drop into a tie for the lead with Els.

At the final hole, needing a birdie to win or a par to get into a playoff with Els, Scott found a bunker off the tee and his ball ended up tight underneath the lip. He was only able to pitch out sideways. For his third stroke he played an iron shot to leave himself with an eight-foot par putt to take the championship to a playoff. Scott narrowly missed the putt on the outside edge of the hole, resulting in another bogey to finish the round. Scott shot a final round of 75 to finish at six under, one stroke behind the champion Ernie Els.

Scott's collapse down the home stretch was compared to many other famous golfing collapses down the years including fellow countryman Greg Norman at the 1996 Masters. After the round Scott said that his finish was down to finding some bad positions on the course, rather than nerves. He also said "I'm very disappointed but I played so beautifully for most of the week I really shouldn't let this bring me down. I know I've let a really great chance slip through my fingers today, but somehow I'll look back and take the positives from it." With his second-place finish, Scott equalled his best ever performance at a major championship, alongside his tied second at the 2011 Masters and he returned to the world's top 10, at number six.

Scott's first appearance after The Open Championship was at the WGC-Bridgestone Invitational, where he attempted to defend his title from the previous year. He ended the week in a tie for 45th place. The following week, Scott was again in the mix at the PGA Championship, entering the final round in the penultimate grouping, four shots behind the leader Rory McIlroy. In good conditions though, Scott shot an over par 73 to drop back into a final position of T11th.

On 18 November, Scott fired a bogey-free final round at Kingston Heath in the Melbourne Sandbelt, to win the Australian Masters for the first time. He trailed defending champion Ian Poulter by one going into the final round, but shot a 67, including a birdie on the last, to don the "Gold Jacket" for Masters champion.

Scott opened the season at the Northern Trust Open, well into February of that year. He finished the event T10th with three rounds under par. He then played the two World Golf Championships consecutively, losing at the WGC-Accenture Match Play Championship in the opening round 2&1 to Tim Clark. In the following WGC-Cadillac Championship, Scott fired the low round of the week on the final day to jump from T19 to T3 behind Tiger Woods and Steve Stricker. His last event before the Masters, was at the Tampa Bay Championship where he finished T30.

At the 2013 Masters Tournament, Scott emerged from the chasing pack on the final day to enter into a tie for the lead heading into the 72nd hole. Scott proceeded to birdie the 18th hole. However, former champion Ángel Cabrera also birdied the 72nd hole to tie Scott for the lead at −9, leading to a sudden-death playoff. Both players parred the first hole (18) with Cabrera inches away from birdie. On the second hole (10), Cabrera once again missed his birdie putt by inches, leaving Scott a 12-foot birdie putt for the championship, which Scott holed. It was Scott's first major championship and marked the first time an Australian has won the Masters. It was also seen by many as redemption for his failure to win the previous year's Open Championship.

Scott's victory at the Masters moved him to No. 3 in the Official World Golf Ranking, equalling his career high ranking.

Scott finished in a tie for 45th place at the U.S. Open. Scott took a one-stroke lead heading into the back nine on the final day of the Open Championship before eventually finishing in a tie for third. The final major of 2013, the PGA Championship, saw Scott finish in a tie for fifth. At the first event of the FedEx Cup Playoffs, The Barclays, Scott finished with a 66 (−5) final round to win over four players by one stroke and move to number two in the World Ranking, a career high.

In October, Scott won the 2013 PGA Grand Slam of Golf event in which the four major winners of that year compete. A month later Scott would win in his native Australia, when he won the Australian PGA Championship, his fourth career victory on the PGA Tour of Australasia. This was quickly followed by winning the Australian Masters on 16 November, at Royal Melbourne, finishing 14 shots under par. The following week Scott would garner victory in the team portion of ISPS Handa World Cup of Golf, with fellow Australian Jason Day. The team shot a combined 17-under-par. Day won the individual championship at 10-under-par. Scott was runner up to Rory McIlroy in the Emirates Australian Open on 1 December 2013. He led by one stroke going into the final hole but a bogey by Scott and a birdie by McIlroy saw a two shot swing and victory to the Northern Irishman. Scott would finish 2013 as the World's #2 ranked golfer.

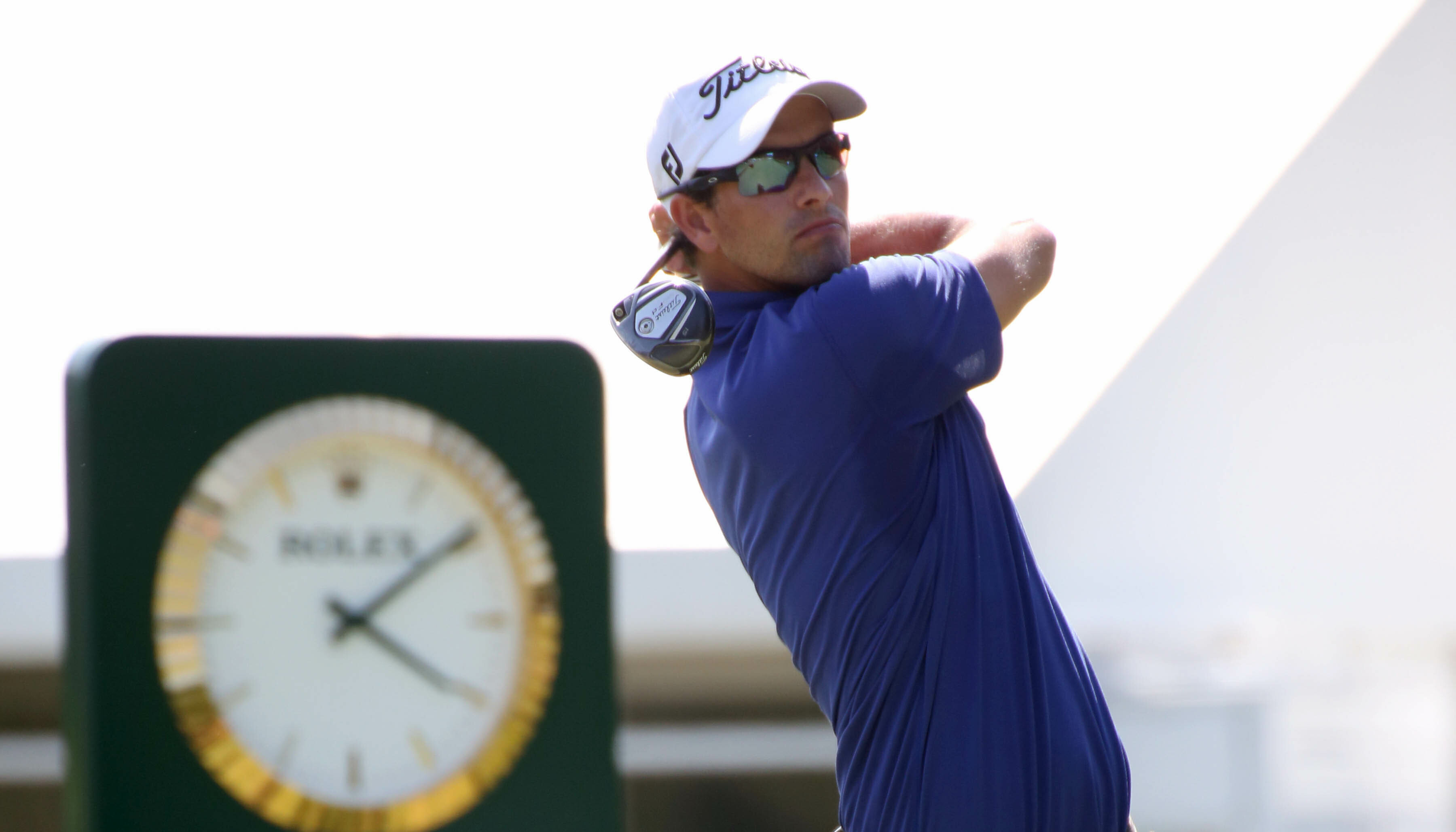
Scott at the 2014 Players Championship.

In March 2014, Scott tied the course record at Bay Hill Club & Lodge, when he shot a 10-under-par 62 during the first round of the Arnold Palmer Invitational. He went on to finish third in the tournament behind the winner Matt Every and Keegan Bradley after a poor four-over-par 76 in the final round.

On 19 May 2014, Scott took over as the World's #1 ranked golfer. Scott is the 17th golfer to be ranked number one since official rankings began. He is also the second Australian and the first since Greg Norman in 1998. A week after becoming world #1, Scott strengthened his ranking with a win at the Crowne Plaza Invitational at Colonial, being the first person to win all four Texas-based PGA Tour events. Scott held the number one ranking for eleven weeks until August 2014.

Scott started the season well with a runner-up finish at the CIMB Classic during the wrap-around 2016 season. He then followed this up during February 2016, with another runner-up placing at the Northern Trust Open, where despite a final hole chip-in birdie, he finished a shot behind winner Bubba Watson.

On 28 February 2016, Scott won his 12th PGA Tour title with victory at The Honda Classic played at PGA National Golf Club. He won by a single stroke over Sergio García to end a near two-year winless drought. This was also Scott's first win with the short putter, following the long putter ban issued in 2016, in over five years since the 2010 Singapore Open. A notable footnote to Scott's victory was also that he became the first player to make a quadruple bogey on the weekend and win the tournament, since Phil Mickelson at the 2009 Tour Championship. The win moved Scott back into the world's top ten, at number nine.

The following week, Scott claimed back-to-back victories with a one stroke victory at the WGC-Cadillac Championship. This was Scott's second victory in a WGC event and was the first time in his career, he had claimed back-to-back wins. He had begun the final round, three strokes back of overnight leader Rory McIlroy, but shot a three-under round of 69 and had to hole a six-foot putt for the par on the final green to take the victory. This coming after Scott made two double-bogeys on the front nine on the third and fifth holes to fall behind the leaders, but then followed this up with six birdies in his next nine holes. The win moved Scott up to number six in the rankings.

In April, Scott announced that he would not be participating in the 2016 Olympic Games, citing 'an extremely busy playing schedule'. International Golf Federation chief executive Peter Dawson branded Scott's decision, as well as other high-profile golfers, 'regrettable', while Gary Player said players who chose to opt out of playing in Rio de Janeiro were 'hurting' the game. However, Scott's fellow countryman Marcus Fraser rushed to his defence, branding criticism of his decision 'absolute garbage'.

In September 2017, Scott's part-time caddie Steve Williams announced that he would no longer be working for him after the end of the year, saying that he wanted to go back to having a full-time caddie from the start of 2018 onwards.

In December 2019, Scott won the Australian PGA Championship for the second time in his career. It was his first win since the 2016 WGC-Cadillac Championship. In February 2020, he claimed his first title on the PGA Tour in nearly four years, winning the Genesis Invitational at the Riviera Country Club in Pacific Palisades, California.

In August 2021, Scott missed out in a five-way play-off at the Wyndham Championship after 72 holes, missing a short putt on the first extra hole to win before Kevin Kisner won on the second extra hole.

Scott qualified for the International team at the 2022 Presidents Cup; he won two and lost three of the five matches he played.

Scott is the touring professional at the Sanctuary Cove Golf & Country Club, where he resides while in Australia, located on the Gold Coast, Queensland.

== Personal life ==
Scott bought a home in Sanctuary Cove, Queensland for $2.75 million in 2006. He sold it in 2024 for $5.35 million, but maintained a holiday home in Sunshine Beach. As of 2013, Scott is a resident of Switzerland for tax purposes. He said in 2015 that he spends around 15 weeks a year in Albany, a resort in the Bahamas. Scott stated in 2022 that it was a disadvantage to live in Switzerland while playing on the PGA Tour due to the frequent travel, and said for the 2023 season that he planned to base himself in Florida from March to June.

In 2010, Scott was in a relationship with Serbian tennis player Ana Ivanovic, but they separated in September of that year. The pair reunited in 2011, before splitting up permanently one year later.

In April 2014, Scott married Marie Kojzar, a Swedish architect, in a small ceremony in the Bahamas. Scott and Kojzar had previously been in a long-term relationship in the early to mid-2000s, before splitting up and then reuniting in 2013. In 2015, the couple had their first child, a daughter who was born at Pindara Private Hospital in Queensland, Australia. Their second child, a son, was born in 2017.

== Awards and honors ==
- In June 2022, Scott was appointed Member of the Order of Australia in the 2022 Queen's Birthday Honours for "significant service to golf at the elite level".

== Professional wins (33) ==
=== PGA Tour wins (14) ===
Legend
Major championships (1)
Players Championships (1)
World Golf Championships (2)
Tour C'ships/FedEx Cup playoff events (2)
Other PGA Tour (8)

No.	Date	Tournament	Winning score	To par	Margin of victory	Runner(s)-up
1	1 Sep 2003	Deutsche Bank Championship	69-62-67-66=264	−20	4 strokes	(United States) Rocco Mediate
2	28 Mar 2004	The Players Championship	65-72-69-70=276	−12	1 stroke	(Republic of Ireland) Pádraig Harrington
3	27 Jun 2004	Booz Allen Classic	66-62-67-68=263	−21	4 strokes	(United States) Charles Howell III
4	5 Nov 2006	The Tour Championship	69-67-67-66=269	−11	3 strokes	(United States) Jim Furyk
5	1 Apr 2007	Shell Houston Open	69-71-65-66=271	−17	3 strokes	(Australia) Stuart Appleby, (United States) Bubba Watson
6	27 Apr 2008	EDS Byron Nelson Championship	68-67-67-71=273	−7	Playoff	(United States) Ryan Moore
7	16 May 2010	Valero Texas Open	71-70-66-67=274	−14	1 stroke	(Sweden) Freddie Jacobson
8	7 Aug 2011	WGC-Bridgestone Invitational	62-70-66-65=263	−17	4 strokes	(England) Luke Donald, (United States) Rickie Fowler
9	14 Apr 2013	Masters Tournament	69-72-69-69=279	−9	Playoff	(Argentina) Ángel Cabrera
10	25 Aug 2013	The Barclays	69-66-72-66=273	−11	1 stroke	(Canada) Graham DeLaet, (England) Justin Rose, (United States) Gary Woodland, (United States) Tiger Woods
11	25 May 2014	Crowne Plaza Invitational at Colonial	71-68-66-66=271	−9	Playoff	(United States) Jason Dufner
12	28 Feb 2016	The Honda Classic	70-65-66-70=271	−9	1 stroke	(Spain) Sergio García
13	6 Mar 2016	WGC-Cadillac Championship	68-66-73-69=276	−12	1 stroke	(United States) Bubba Watson
14	16 Feb 2020	Genesis Invitational	72-64-67-70=273	−11	2 strokes	(United States) Scott Brown, (South Korea) Kang Sung-hoon, (United States) Matt Kuchar

PGA Tour playoff record (3–1)

No.	Year	Tournament	Opponent(s)	Result
1	2008	EDS Byron Nelson Championship	(United States) Ryan Moore	Won with birdie on third extra hole
2	2013	Masters Tournament	(Argentina) Ángel Cabrera	Won with birdie on second extra hole
3	2014	Crowne Plaza Invitational at Colonial	(United States) Jason Dufner	Won with birdie on third extra hole
4	2021	Wyndham Championship	(South Africa) Branden Grace, (South Korea) Kim Si-woo, (United States) Kevin Kisner, (United States) Kevin Na, (Canada) Roger Sloan	Kisner won with birdie on second extra hole

=== European Tour wins (11) ===
Legend
Major championships (1)
World Golf Championships (2)
Other European Tour (8)

No.	Date	Tournament	Winning score	To par	Margin of victory	Runner(s)-up
1	21 Jan 2001	Alfred Dunhill Championship^{1}	67-66-65-69=267	−21	1 stroke	(England) Justin Rose
2	17 Mar 2002	Qatar Masters	67-66-69-67=269	−19	6 strokes	(France) Jean-François Remésy, (England) Nick Dougherty
3	25 Aug 2002	Diageo Scottish PGA Championship	67-65-67-63=262	−26	10 strokes	(Scotland) Raymond Russell
4	3 Aug 2003	Scandic Carlsberg Scandinavian Masters	70-71-67-69=277	−11	2 strokes	(England) Nick Dougherty
5	24 Apr 2005	Johnnie Walker Classic^{2,3}	63-66-69-72=270	−18	3 strokes	(South Africa) Retief Goosen
6	27 Jan 2008	Commercialbank Qatar Masters (2)	69-73-65-61=268	−20	3 strokes	(Sweden) Henrik Stenson
7	14 Nov 2010	Barclays Singapore Open^{2}	65-65-69-68=267	−17	3 strokes	(Denmark) Anders Hansen
8	7 Aug 2011	WGC-Bridgestone Invitational	62-70-66-65=263	−17	4 strokes	(England) Luke Donald, (United States) Rickie Fowler
9	14 Apr 2013	Masters Tournament	69-72-69-69=279	−9	Playoff	(Argentina) Ángel Cabrera
10	6 Mar 2016	WGC-Cadillac Championship	68-66-73-69=276	−12	1 stroke	(United States) Bubba Watson
11	22 Dec 2019 (2020 season)	Australian PGA Championship^{3}	70-67-69-69=275	−13	2 strokes	(New Zealand) Michael Hendry

^{1}Co-sanctioned by the Sunshine Tour
^{2}Co-sanctioned by the Asian Tour
^{3}Co-sanctioned by the PGA Tour of Australasia

European Tour playoff record (1–0)

No.	Year	Tournament	Opponent	Result
1	2013	Masters Tournament	(Argentina) Ángel Cabrera	Won with birdie on second extra hole

=== Asian Tour wins (4) ===
No.	Date	Tournament	Winning score	To par	Margin of victory	Runner-up
1	24 Apr 2005	Johnnie Walker Classic^{1,2}	63-66-69-72=270	−18	3 strokes	(South Africa) Retief Goosen
2	11 Sep 2005	Barclays Singapore Open	70-69-67-65=271	−13	7 strokes	(England) Lee Westwood
3	11 Sep 2006	Barclays Singapore Open (2)	70-69-66=205 (Note: Shortened to 54 holes due to weather.)	−8	Playoff	(South Africa) Ernie Els
4	14 Nov 2010	Barclays Singapore Open^{1} (3)	65-65-69-68=267	−17	3 strokes	(Denmark) Anders Hansen

^{1}Co-sanctioned by European Tour
^{2}Co-sanctioned by the PGA Tour of Australasia

Asian Tour playoff record (1–0)

No.	Year	Tournament	Opponent	Result
1	2006	Barclays Singapore Open	(South Africa) Ernie Els	Won three-hole aggregate playoff; Scott: −1 (4-3-4=11), Els: +1 (4-3-6=13)

=== PGA Tour of Australasia wins (6) ===
Legend
Flagship events (1)
Other PGA Tour of Australasia (5)

No.	Date	Tournament	Winning score	To par	Margin of victory	Runner-up
1	24 Apr 2005	Johnnie Walker Classic^{1,2}	63-66-69-72=270	−18	3 strokes	(South Africa) Retief Goosen
2	6 Dec 2009	Australian Open^{3}	68-66-67-72=273	−15	5 strokes	(Australia) Stuart Appleby
3	18 Nov 2012	Talisker Masters	67-70-67-67=271	−17	4 strokes	(England) Ian Poulter
4	10 Nov 2013	Australian PGA Championship^{3}	65-67-71-67=270	−14	4 strokes	(United States) Rickie Fowler
5	17 Nov 2013	Talisker Masters (2)	67-66-66-71=270	−14	2 strokes	(United States) Matt Kuchar
6	22 Dec 2019	Australian PGA Championship^{1} (2)	70-67-69-69=275	−13	2 strokes	(New Zealand) Michael Hendry

^{1}Co-sanctioned by the European Tour
^{2}Co-sanctioned by the Asian Tour
^{3}Co-sanctioned by the OneAsia Tour

PGA Tour of Australasia playoff record (0–3)

No.	Year	Tournament	Opponents	Result
1	2002	MasterCard Masters	(Australia) Gavin Coles, (Australia) Peter Lonard	Lonard won with par on third extra hole Scott eliminated by par on first hole
2	2003	MasterCard Masters	(Australia) Robert Allenby, (Australia) Jarrod Moseley, (Australia) Craig Parry	Allenby won with birdie on second extra hole Moseley and Parry eliminated by birdie on first hole
3	2014	Australian PGA Championship	(Australia) Greg Chalmers, (Australia) Wade Ormsby	Chalmers won with par on seventh extra hole Ormsby eliminated by birdie on third hole

=== Other wins (5) ===
No.	Date	Tournament	Winning score	To par	Margin of victory	Runner(s)-up
1	20 Feb 2005	Nissan Open	66-67=133 (Note: The 2005 Nissan Open was shortened to 36 holes due to rain. Due to the length of the event this win is not officially recognised as a PGA Tour victory.)	−9	Playoff	(United States) Chad Campbell
2	16 Oct 2013	PGA Grand Slam of Golf	70-64=134	−8	2 strokes	(England) Justin Rose
3	24 Nov 2013	ISPS Handa World Cup of Golf (with (Australia) Jason Day)	143-138-134-136=551	−17	10 strokes	United States − Matt Kuchar and Kevin Streelman
4	6 Dec 2023	Cathedral Invitational	64-68=132	−12	3 strokes	(Australia) Jeffrey Guan, (Australia) Todd Sinnott
5	10 Dec 2025	Cathedral Invitational (2)	65-64=129	−15	4 strokes	(Australia) Ben Henkel, (Australia) Marc Leishman

Other playoff record (1–1)

No.	Year	Tournament	Opponent(s)	Result
1	2005	Nissan Open	(United States) Chad Campbell	Won with par on first extra hole
2	2005	Nedbank Golf Challenge	(Northern Ireland) Darren Clarke, (United States) Jim Furyk, (South Africa) Retief Goosen	Furyk won with birdie on second extra hole Goosen eliminated by par on first hole

== Major championships ==
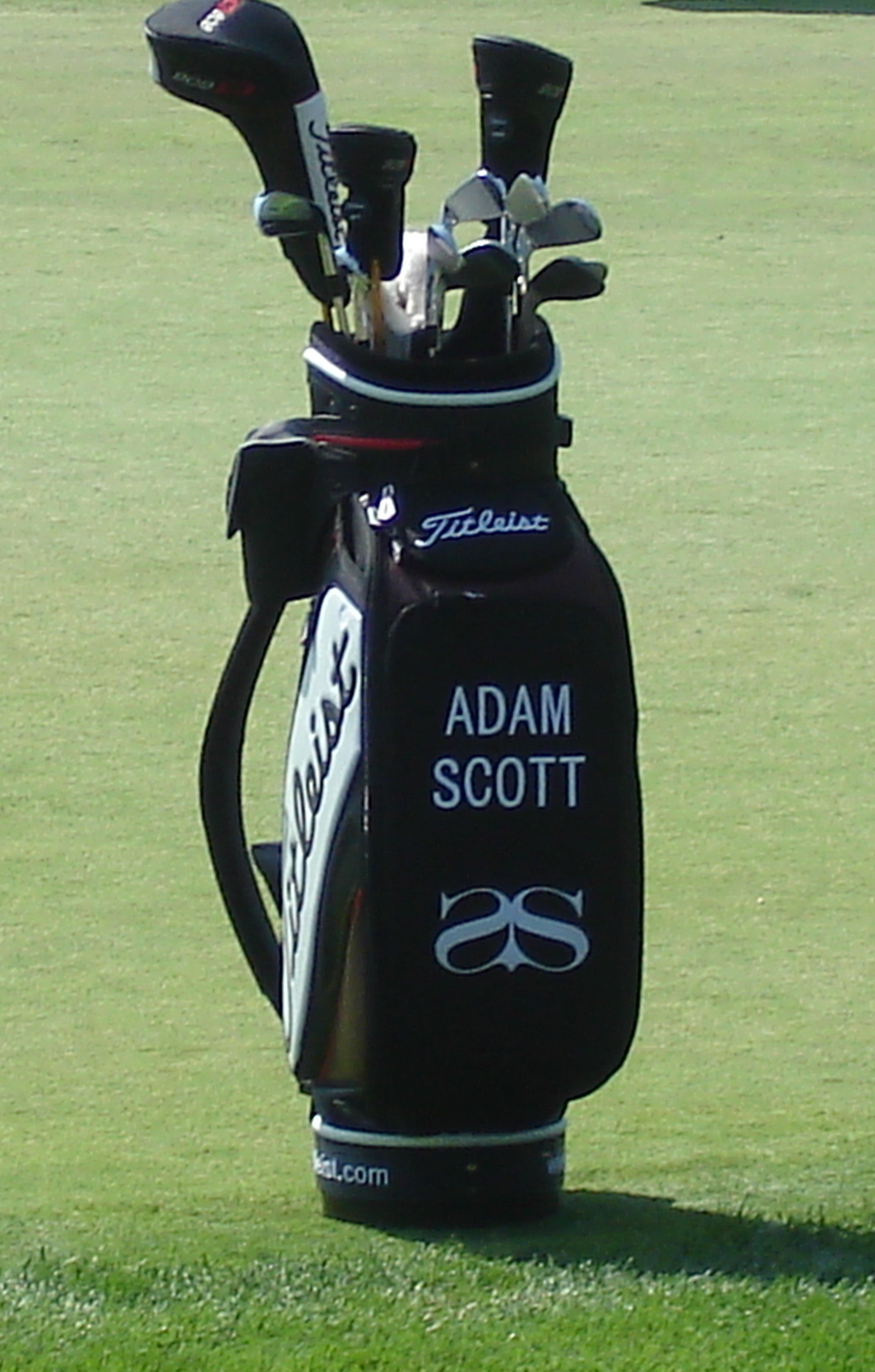
Scott's golf bag at the 2009 PGA Championship with his signature AS logo

=== Wins (1) ===
Year	Championship	54 holes	Winning score	Margin	Runner-up
2013	Masters Tournament	1 shot deficit	−9 (69-72-69-69=279)	Playoff^{1}	(Argentina) Ángel Cabrera

^{1}Defeated Cabrera in a sudden-death playoff: Scott (4-3), Cabrera (4-4).

=== Results timeline ===
Results not in chronological order in 2020.

Tournament	2000	2001	2002	2003	2004	2005	2006	2007	2008	2009
Masters Tournament			T9	T23	CUT	T33	T27	T27	T25	CUT
U.S. Open			CUT	CUT	CUT	T28	T21	CUT	T26	T36
The Open Championship	CUT	T47	CUT	CUT	T42	T34	T8	T27	T16	CUT
PGA Championship		CUT	T23	T23	T9	T40	T3	T12	CUT	CUT

Tournament	2010	2011	2012	2013	2014	2015	2016	2017	2018
Masters Tournament	T18	T2	T8	1	T14	T38	T42	T9	T32
U.S. Open	CUT	CUT	T15	T45	T9	T4	T18	CUT	CUT
The Open Championship	T27	T25	2	T3	T5	T10	T43	T22	T17
PGA Championship	T39	7	T11	T5	T15	CUT	T18	T61	3

Tournament	2019	2020	2021	2022	2023	2024	2025	2026
Masters Tournament	T18	T34	54	T48	T39	T22	CUT	T24
PGA Championship	T8	T22	CUT	CUT	T29	CUT	T19	CUT
U.S. Open	T7	T38	T35	T14	CUT	T32	T12	CUT
The Open Championship	CUT	NT	T46	T15	T33	T10	CUT	T9

Win
Top 10
Did not play

CUT = missed the half-way cut
"T" = tied
NT = no tournament due to COVID-19 pandemic

=== Summary ===
Tournament	Wins	2nd	3rd	Top-5	Top-10	Top-25	Events	Cuts made
Masters Tournament	1	1	0	2	5	12	25	22
PGA Championship	0	0	2	3	6	14	26	18
U.S. Open	0	0	0	1	3	8	25	15
The Open Championship	0	1	1	3	7	12	26	20
Totals	1	2	3	9	21	46	102	75

- Most consecutive cuts made – 17 (2011 Open – 2015 Open)
- Longest streak of top-10s – 2 (six times)

== The Players Championship ==
=== Wins (1) ===
Year	Championship	54 holes	Winning score	Margin	Runner-up
2004	The Players Championship	2 shot lead	−12 (65-72-69-70=276)	1 stroke	(Republic of Ireland) Pádraig Harrington

=== Results timeline ===
Tournament	2002	2003	2004	2005	2006	2007	2008	2009
The Players Championship	CUT	T17	1	T8	T53	T6	T54	CUT

Tournament	2010	2011	2012	2013	2014	2015	2016	2017	2018	2019
The Players Championship	T26	CUT	T15	T19	T38	T38	T12	T6	T11	T12

Tournament	2020	2021	2022	2023	2024	2025	2026
The Players Championship	C	T41	CUT	71	T45	CUT	T56

Win
Top 10

CUT = missed the halfway cut
"T" indicates a tie for a place
C = cancelled after the first round due to the COVID-19 pandemic

== World Golf Championships ==
=== Wins (2) ===
Year	Championship	54 holes	Winning score	Margin	Runner(s)-up
2011	WGC-Bridgestone Invitational	1 shot lead	−17 (62-70-66-65=263)	4 strokes	(England) Luke Donald, (United States) Rickie Fowler
2016	WGC-Cadillac Championship	3 shot deficit	−12 (68-66-73-69=276)	1 stroke	(United States) Bubba Watson

=== Results timeline ===
Results not in chronological order before 2015.

Tournament	2002	2003	2004	2005	2006	2007	2008	2009	2010	2011	2012	2013	2014	2015	2016	2017	2018	2019
Championship	T39	T40	T36	T29	T2	T61	T9	T66	T50	T6	T13	T3	T25	T4	1	T45		
Match Play	R32	3	R16	QF	R32	R64	R32	R64	R32	R64	R64	R64		T52	T28			
Invitational		T64	T55	T36	T10	T36	T56	T51	T9	1	T45	T14	T8	T45	T10	T13	T57	T40
Champions									T25	T11	8		T12	70	T14	T50	T18	T11

Tournament	2020	2021	2022	2023
Championship	T26	T54		
Match Play	NT^{1}		R16	T31
Invitational		T36		
Champions	NT^{1}	NT^{1}	NT^{1}	

^{1}Cancelled due to COVID-19 pandemic

Win
Top 10
Did not play

QF, R16, R32, R64 = Round in which player lost in match play
NT = no tournament
"T" = tied
Note that the HSBC Champions did not become a WGC event until 2009.
Note that the Championship and Invitational were discontinued from 2022. The Champions was discontinued from 2023.

== Team appearances ==
- World Cup (representing Australia): 2001, 2002, 2013 (winners), 2016
- Presidents Cup (representing the International team): 2003 (tie), 2005, 2007, 2009, 2011, 2013, 2015, 2017, 2019, 2022, 2024, 2026

== See also ==
- List of golfers with most European Tour wins
- List of golfers with most PGA Tour wins
- List of men's major championships winning golfers
