= Aloha Golf Club =

Golf club in Marbella, Andalusia, Spain

Coordinates: 36°30′41″N 4°57′35″W

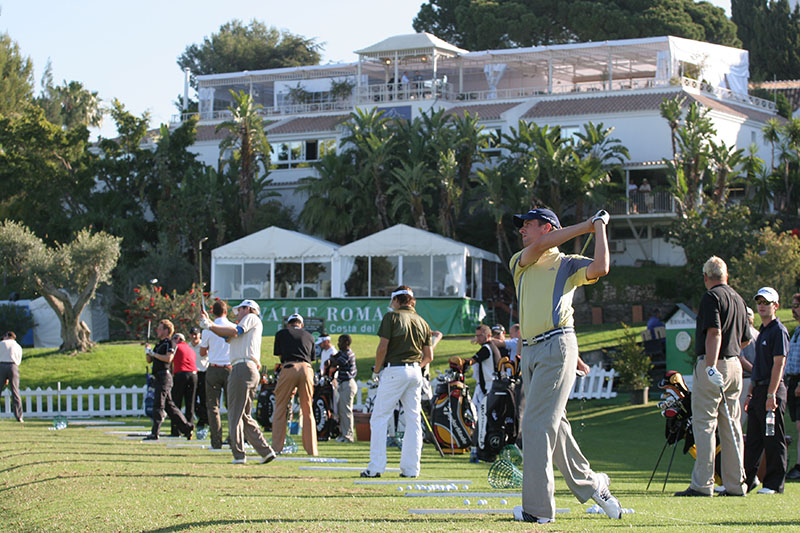
Aloha Golf Club house

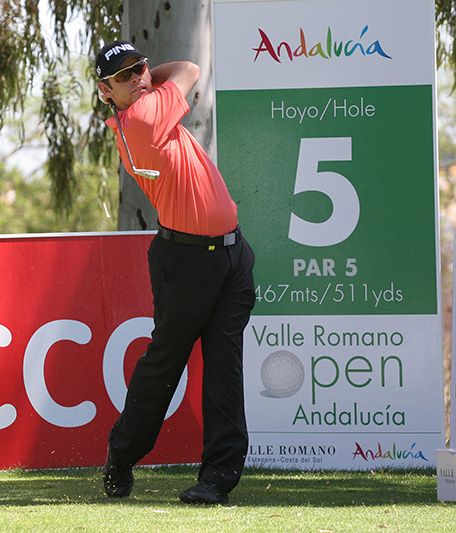
Louis Oosthuizen teeing off at the Par 5 5th hole at the 2007 Open de Andalucia tournament at the Aloha Golf Club

Aloha Golf Club is a golf club, located 3 kilometres inland from Puerto Banús and 8 kilometres west of Marbella, Andalusia, Spain. It hosted the Andalucian Open on the European Tour in 2007, 2008 and 2012, and the Spanish Women's Open on the Ladies European Tour in 2016 and 2019.

The Aloha Golf Club was established in 1975, and in 2005, it celebrated its 30th anniversary with a dinner gala dance. It is a private members' club; guests of members and guests of the club are welcomed, but since 2023, members of the public are no longer admitted.

== Course ==
The Javier Arana designed golf course has a total length of 6246 metres and is noted for its narrow tree-lined fairways and numerous lakes and streams.

The names of the holes are as follows:

1. Miguel Angel Jimenez
2. Uresandi
3. Los Olivos
4. Cortavitarte
5. La Fuente
6. Prunus-Prisard
7. El Ruedo
8. Penablanca
9. El Jorobado
10. Javier Arana
11. Las Aguilas
12. Cuidiao
13. El Algarrobo
14. Curlucho
15. Camino Ronda
16. Cancionero
17. Obelix
18. Vistos
