= 2011 WGC-Bridgestone Invitational =

Coordinates: 41.008°N 81.508°W

Tournament information
- Dates: August 4–7, 2011
- Location: Akron, Ohio, U.S.
- Course(s): Firestone Country Club; South Course
- Tour(s): PGA Tour; European Tour

Statistics
- Par: 70
- Length: 7,400 yards (6,767 m)
- Field: 76 players
- Cut: None
- Prize fund: $8,500,000 €5,804,071
- Winner's share: $1,400,000 €972,148

Champion
- (Australia) Adam Scott
- 263 (−17)

Location in the United States
Location in Ohio

The 2011 WGC-Bridgestone Invitational was the 13th WGC-Bridgestone Invitational, held August 4–7 at Firestone Country Club in Akron, Ohio. Adam Scott was the winner on the South Course, four strokes ahead of Luke Donald and Rickie Fowler. This tournament was the third of four World Golf Championships events held in 2011.

== Venue ==
=== Course layout ===
The South Course was designed by Bert Way and redesigned by Robert Trent Jones in 1960.

Hole	1	2	3	4	5	6	7	8	9	Out	10	11	12	13	14	15	16	17	18	In	Total
Yards	399	526	442	471	200	469	219	482	494	3702	410	418	180	471	467	221	667	400	464	3698	7400
Par	4	5	4	4	3	4	3	4	4	35	4	4	3	4	4	3	5	4	4	35	70

== Field ==
1. Playing members of the 2010 United States and European Ryder Cup teams.
Stewart Cink, Luke Donald (2,3,4), Rickie Fowler (2,3), Jim Furyk (2,3,4), Peter Hanson (2,3), Pádraig Harrington (5), Miguel Ángel Jiménez (2,3,4), Dustin Johnson (2,3,4), Zach Johnson (2,3), Martin Kaymer (2,3,4), Matt Kuchar (2,3,4), Hunter Mahan (2,3,4), Graeme McDowell (2,3,4), Rory McIlroy (2,3,4), Phil Mickelson (2,3,4), Edoardo Molinari (2,3,4), Francesco Molinari (2,3,4), Jeff Overton, Ian Poulter (2,3,4), Steve Stricker (2,3,4), Bubba Watson (2,3,4), Lee Westwood (2,3,4), Tiger Woods (2,3)

(Ross Fisher qualified but chose not to play.)

2. The top 50 players from the Official World Golf Ranking as of July 25.
Robert Allenby (3), Jonathan Byrd (4), Paul Casey (3,4), K. J. Choi (3,4), Darren Clarke (3,4), Jason Day (3), Ernie Els (3,4), Sergio García (3), Retief Goosen (3), Bill Haas (3), Anders Hansen (3), Ryo Ishikawa (3), Robert Karlsson (3,4), Kim Kyung-tae (3,4), Martin Laird (3,4), Matteo Manassero (3,4), Ryan Moore (3), Geoff Ogilvy (3), Louis Oosthuizen (3), Álvaro Quirós (3,4), Justin Rose (3), Charl Schwartzel (3,4), Adam Scott (3,4), Brandt Snedeker (3,4), David Toms (3,4), Bo Van Pelt (3), Nick Watney (3,4), Gary Woodland (3,4), Yang Yong-eun (3)

(Tim Clark withdrew with an elbow injury.)

3. The top 50 players from the Official World Golf Ranking as August 1, 2011.
Simon Dyson (4)

4. Tournament winners of worldwide events since the prior year's tournament with an Official World Golf Ranking Strength of Field Rating of 115 points or more.
Stuart Appleby, Arjun Atwal, Aaron Baddeley, Keegan Bradley, Thomas Bjørn, Harrison Frazar, Lucas Glover, Richard Green, Charley Hoffman, Yuta Ikeda (5), Freddie Jacobson, Pablo Larrazábal, Thomas Levet, Alex Norén, Sean O'Hair, D. A. Points, Rory Sabbatini, Heath Slocum, Scott Stallings, Brendan Steele, Jhonattan Vegas, Mark Wilson

(Nicolas Colsaerts withdrew with an elbow injury. Thomas Levet withdrew with an injury.)

5. The winner of selected tournaments from each of the following tours:

- Japan Golf Tour: Japan Golf Tour Championship (2011) – Park Jae-bum
- Japan Golf Tour: Bridgestone Open (2010) – Yuta Ikeda
- PGA Tour of Australasia: Australian PGA Championship (2010) – Peter Senior (qualified but chose not to play.)
- Sunshine Tour: Dimension Data Pro-Am (2011) – Hennie Otto
- Asian Tour: Iskandar Johor Open (2010) – Pádraig Harrington, also qualified in categories 2 and 3

== Round summaries ==
=== First round ===
Thursday, August 4, 2011

Playing in his first competitive round since May due to a leg injury, Tiger Woods shot a 68 (−2). Rory McIlroy, in his first event in America since winning the U.S. Open, also shot 68. Phil Mickelson and Lee Westwood were at 67, but two Australians topped the leaderboard with Adam Scott at 62 (−8) and Jason Day at 63. Nick Watney had the lowest score of the Americans with a 65. Rory Sabbatini, D. A. Points, Stewart Cink, Thomas Bjørn, Brandt Snedeker, Martin Laird, Ryan Moore, Pablo Larrazábal, and Kim Kyung-tae all shot 66.

Place	Player	Score	To par
1	(Australia) Adam Scott	62	−8
2	(Australia) Jason Day	63	−7
3	(United States) Nick Watney	65	−5
T4	(Denmark) Thomas Bjørn	66	−4
T4	(United States) Stewart Cink	66	−4
T4	(South Korea) Kim Kyung-tae	66	−4
T4	(Scotland) Martin Laird	66	−4
T4	(Spain) Pablo Larrazábal	66	−4
T4	(United States) Ryan Moore	66	−4
T4	(United States) D. A. Points	66	−4
T4	(South Africa) Rory Sabbatini	66	−4
T4	(United States) Brandt Snedeker	66	−4

=== Second round ===
Friday, August 5, 2011

Place	Player	Score	To par
T1	(United States) Keegan Bradley	67-65=132	−8
T1	(United States) Rickie Fowler	68-64=132	−8
T1	(United States) Ryan Moore	66-66=132	−8
T1	(Australia) Adam Scott	62-70=132	−8
T5	(Australia) Jason Day	63-70=133	−7
T5	(Sweden) Robert Karlsson	68-65=133	−7
T5	(Scotland) Martin Laird	66-67=133	−7
T8	(Sweden) Freddie Jacobson	68-66=134	−6
T8	(United States) Brandt Snedeker	66-68=134	−6
T10	(Japan) Ryo Ishikawa	67-68=135	−5
T10	(South Africa) Hennie Otto	69-66=135	−5
T10	(United States) Nick Watney	65-70=135	−5

=== Third round ===
Saturday, August 6, 2011

Place	Player	Score	To par
1	(Australia) Adam Scott	62-70-66=198	−12
T2	(Australia) Jason Day	63-70-66=199	−11
T2	(Japan) Ryo Ishikawa	67-68-64=199	−11
T4	(United States) Keegan Bradley	67-65-68=200	−10
T4	(Scotland) Martin Laird	66-67-67=200	−10
T6	(England) Luke Donald	68-69-64=201	−9
T6	(United States) Rickie Fowler	68-64-69=201	−9
T6	(Sweden) Freddie Jacobson	68-66-67=201	−9
9	(United States) Zach Johnson	70-68-64=202	−8
T10	(Northern Ireland) Rory McIlroy	68-68-67=203	−7
T10	(United States) Steve Stricker	71-65-67=203	−7

=== Final round ===
Sunday, August 7, 2011

Place	Player	Score	To par	Money ($)
1	(Australia) Adam Scott	62-70-66-65=263	−17	1,400,000
T2	(England) Luke Donald	68-69-64-66=267	−13	665,000
T2	(United States) Rickie Fowler	68-64-69-66=267	−13	665,000
T4	(Australia) Jason Day	63-70-66-69=268	−12	332,500
T4	(Japan) Ryo Ishikawa	67-68-64-69=268	−12	332,500
T6	(United States) Zach Johnson	70-68-64-68=270	−10	215,000
T6	(South Korea) Kim Kyung-tae	66-72-66-66=270	−10	215,000
T6	(Northern Ireland) Rory McIlroy	68-68-67-67=270	−10	215,000
T9	(United States) David Toms	68-68-68-67=271	−9	152,500
T9	(England) Lee Westwood	67-71-68-65=271	−9	152,500

==== Scorecard ====
Final round

Hole	1	2	3	4	5	6	7	8	9	10	11	12	13	14	15	16	17	18
Par	4	5	4	4	3	4	3	4	4	4	4	3	4	4	3	5	4	4
(Australia) Scott	−12	−13	−13	−13	−13	−13	−13	−13	−13	−14	−14	−15	−15	−16	−16	−16	−16	−17
(England) Donald	−10	−10	−10	−10	−10	−10	−10	−10	−10	−11	−11	−11	−12	−11	−11	−12	−12	−13
(United States) Fowler	−10	−10	−10	−11	−11	−11	−11	−11	−11	−11	−11	−11	−12	−12	−12	−12	−12	−13
(Australia) Day	−12	−11	−11	−11	−12	−12	−12	−11	−11	−12	−12	−12	−12	−12	−11	−12	−12	−12
(Japan) Ishikawa	−11	−12	−13	−12	−12	−13	−13	−12	−12	−13	−13	−13	−13	−13	−12	−13	−13	−12

Cumulative tournament scores, relative to par

Birdie	Bogey
