= Volvo Golf Champions =

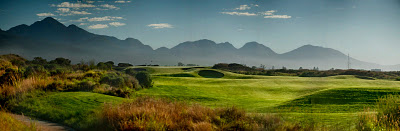
- The Links at Fancourt (2011)

Tournament information
- Location: Durban, South Africa
- Established: 2011
- Course: Durban Country Club
- Par: 72
- Length: 6,689 yards (6,116 m)
- Tour: European Tour
- Format: Stroke play
- Prize fund: US$4,000,000
- Month played: January
- Final year: 2014

Tournament record score
- Aggregate: 268 Paul Casey (2011)
- To par: −20 as above

Final champion
- (South Africa) Louis Oosthuizen
- Location in South Africa Location in KwaZulu-Natal

The Volvo Golf Champions was an annual 72-hole stroke play men's professional golf tournament on the European Tour. Following the inaugural tournament in the Kingdom of Bahrain in 2011, the 2012 event was moved to the Southern hemisphere and the Fancourt Golf Resort in South Africa. In 2013 and 2014, it was played at the Durban Country Club in Durban, South Africa. The tournament was a unique "Tournament of Champions" style event which saw European Tour winners compete together with leading amateurs on one day of the tournament.

The tournament was created by Volvo, together with IMG and in conjunction with the European Tour Tournament Committee. It was cancelled after the 2014 event when Volvo reduced their sponsorship commitments on the tour.

== Format ==
The Championship was contested over 72 holes, with all participants playing four rounds (there was no cut after 36 holes).

On Friday, the Volvo World Golf Challenge "World Finalists" played in the tournament, with one amateur playing with two professionals in each group. The professionals continued to play individual stroke play format, while the amateurs played in a team competition with both professionals in their group forming their team. The best two scores of the three team members on each hole counted towards the team total.

== Qualification ==
The Championship was open to players who had taken up the current year's European Tour Membership and who were eligible under the following categories:

1. Players who had won during the previous year's European Tour schedule.
2. Past winners of the Volvo Golf Champions under 50 years of age on the first day of the tournament.
3. Players with 10 or more official Race to Dubai/European Tour Order of Merit tournament wins under 50 years of age on the first day of the tournament.

== Winners ==
Year	Winner	Score	To par	Margin of victory	Runner(s)-up	Venue	Ref.
2014	(South Africa) Louis Oosthuizen (2)	276	−12	1 stroke	(South Africa) Branden Grace	Durban, South Africa	
2013	(South Africa) Louis Oosthuizen	272	−16	1 stroke	(Scotland) Scott Jamieson	Durban, South Africa	
2012	(South Africa) Branden Grace	280	−12	Playoff	(South Africa) Ernie Els (South Africa) Retief Goosen	Fancourt, South Africa	
2011	(England) Paul Casey	268	−20	1 stroke	(Sweden) Peter Hanson (Spain) Miguel Ángel Jiménez	The Royal GC, Bahrain	
