= 2011 Volvo World Match Play Championship =

Tournament information
- Dates: 19–22 May
- Location: Andalusia, Spain
- Course(s): Finca Cortesín Golf Club
- Tour(s): European Tour
- Format: Match play – 18 holes

Statistics
- Par: 72
- Length: 7,290 yards (6,670 m)
- Field: 24 players
- Prize fund: €3,400,000
- Winner's share: €800,000

Champion
- (England) Ian Poulter
- def. Luke Donald 2 & 1

The 2011 Volvo World Match Play Championship was the 46th Volvo World Match Play Championship played. It was held 19–22 May, with the champion receiving €800,000. The format was 24 players split into eight pools of three, with the top two in each pool progressing to the knock-out stage. It was an official money event on the European Tour.

== Course ==
| | 1 | 2 | 3 | 4 | 5 | 6 | 7 | 8 | 9 | Out | 10 | 11 | 12 | 13 | 14 | 15 | 16 | 17 | 18 | In | Total |
| Yards | 471 | 215 | 541 | 334 | 575 | 195 | 494 | 574 | 352 | 3,751 | 188 | 627 | 224 | 413 | 353 | 525 | 464 | 177 | 568 | 3,539 | 7,290 |
| Par | 4 | 3 | 5 | 4 | 5 | 3 | 4 | 5 | 4 | 37 | 3 | 5 | 3 | 4 | 4 | 4 | 4 | 3 | 5 | 35 | 72 |

== Format ==
The 24 players were split into eight pools of three, with the players seeded by their Official World Golf Ranking. Within each pool, every player played each other in a round-robin format over 18-hole matches. Points were awarded based upon win (2), tie (1) or loss (0). The two leading players from each pool advanced to the knock-out stage. In case of ties, sudden-death playoffs were used to determine rankings.

== Participants ==
| Seed | Player | Rank |
|---|---|---|
| 1 | (England) Lee Westwood | 1 |
| 2 | (England) Luke Donald | 2 |
| 3 | (Germany) Martin Kaymer | 3 |
| 4 | (Northern Ireland) Graeme McDowell | 5 |
| 5 | (Northern Ireland) Rory McIlroy | 6 |
| 6 | (England) Paul Casey | 9 |
| 7 | (South Africa) Charl Schwartzel | 12 |
| 8 | (Italy) Francesco Molinari | 21 |
| 9 | (England) Ian Poulter | 22 |
| 10 | (Spain) Miguel Ángel Jiménez | 25 |
| 11 | (Spain) Álvaro Quirós | 26 |
| 12 | (South Africa) Retief Goosen | 27 |
| 13 | (South Africa) Louis Oosthuizen | 32 |
| 14 | (South Korea) Yang Yong-eun | 38 |
| 15 | (United States) Ryan Moore | 39 |
| 16 | (Denmark) Anders Hansen | 40 |
| 17 | (Australia) Aaron Baddeley | 50 |
| 18 | (England) Ross Fisher | 51 |
| 19 | (South Korea) Noh Seung-yul | 82 |
| 20 | (Venezuela) Jhonattan Vegas | 96 |
| 21 | (Belgium) Nicolas Colsaerts | 108 |
| 22 | (Denmark) Søren Kjeldsen | 111 |
| 23 | (Sweden) Johan Edfors | 124 |
| 24 | (Scotland) Paul Lawrie | 133 |

== Pool play ==
Pool Ballesteros
| Winner | Score | Loser |
|---|---|---|
| Lee Westwood | 6 & 5 | Anders Hansen |
| Aaron Baddeley | 1 up | Anders Hansen |
| Lee Westwood | 4 & 3 | Aaron Baddeley |

- 1st – Westwood
- 2nd – Baddeley
- 3rd – Hansen

Pool Gabrielsson
| Winner | Score | Loser |
|---|---|---|
| Miguel Ángel Jiménez | 6 & 5 | Charl Schwartzel |
| Johan Edfors | 2 & 1 | Miguel Ángel Jiménez |
| Charl Schwartzel | 5 & 4 | Johan Edfors |

- 1st – Schwartzel (Schwartzel wins at second extra hole.)
- 2nd – Edfors
- 3rd – Jiménez (Jiménez eliminated on first extra hole.)

Pool Palmer
| Winner | Score | Loser |
|---|---|---|
| Martin Kaymer | 2 & 1 | Yang Yong-eun |
| Noh Seung-yul | 2 & 1 | Yang Yong-eun |
| Martin Kaymer | 2 & 1 | Noh Seung-yul |

- 1st – Kaymer
- 2nd – Noh
- 3rd – Yang

Pool Larson
| Winner | Score | Loser |
|---|---|---|
| Rory McIlroy | 1 up | Retief Goosen |
| Nicolas Colsaerts | 1 up | Retief Goosen |
| Nicolas Colsaerts | 3 & 2 | Rory McIlroy |

- 1st – Colsaerts
- 2nd – McIlroy
- 3rd – Goosen

Pool Woosnam
| Winner | Score | Loser |
|---|---|---|
| Graeme McDowell | 2 & 1 | Louis Oosthuizen |
| Jhonattan Vegas | 5 & 4 | Louis Oosthuizen |
| Graeme McDowell | 4 & 2 | Jhonattan Vegas |

- 1st – McDowell
- 2nd – Vegas
- 3rd – Oosthuizen

Pool Norman
| Winner | Score | Loser |
|---|---|---|
| Álvaro Quirós | 3 & 1 | Paul Casey |
| Álvaro Quirós | 3 & 1 | Søren Kjeldsen |
| Søren Kjeldsen | 1 up | Paul Casey |

- 1st – Quirós
- 2nd – Kjeldsen
- 3rd – Casey

Pool McCormack
| Winner | Score | Loser |
|---|---|---|
| Luke Donald | 5 & 4 | Ryan Moore |
| Ross Fisher | 2 & 1 | Ryan Moore |
| Luke Donald | 4 & 3 | Ross Fisher |

- 1st – Donald
- 2nd – Fisher
- 3rd – Moore

Pool Player
| Winner | Score | Loser |
|---|---|---|
| Francesco Molinari | Halved | Ian Poulter |
| Ian Poulter | Halved | Paul Lawrie |
| Francesco Molinari | 3 & 2 | Paul Lawrie |

- 1st – Molinari
- 2nd – Poulter
- 3rd – Lawrie

== Playoffs ==
Round of 16; 21 May, morning
(South Korea) Noh Seung-yul
(Spain) Álvaro Quirós | 1up
(Germany) Martin Kaymer | 3&2
(Denmark) Søren Kjeldsen
(England) Ross Fisher
(South Africa) Charl Schwartzel | 1up
(England) Luke Donald | 19h
(Sweden) Johan Edfors
(Venezuela) Jhonattan Vegas
(Belgium) Nicolas Colsaerts | 1up
(Northern Ireland) Graeme McDowell | 3&2
(Northern Ireland) Rory McIlroy
(Australia) Aaron Baddeley
(Italy) Francesco Molinari | 3&2
(England) Lee Westwood
(England) Ian Poulter | 1 up

Quarter-finals; 21 May, afternoon
(Spain) Álvaro Quirós
(Germany) Martin Kaymer | 2up
(South Africa) Charl Schwartzel
(England) Luke Donald | 2up
(Belgium) Nicolas Colsaerts | 2&1
(Northern Ireland) Graeme McDowell
(Italy) Francesco Molinari
(England) Ian Poulter | 2up

Semi-finals; 22 May, morning
(Germany) Martin Kaymer
(England) Luke Donald | 5&3
(Belgium) Nicolas Colsaerts
(England) Ian Poulter | 19h

Final; 22 May, afternoon
(England) Luke Donald
(England) Ian Poulter | 2&1

== Prize money breakdown ==
| Place | Actual prize fund (€) | Race to Dubai fund (€) |
|---|---|---|
| Champion | 800,000 | 566,660 |
| Runner-up | 420,000 | 377,770 |
| Semi-finals losers x 2 | 220,000 | 119,400 |
| Quarter-finals losers x 4 | 115,000 | 112,500 |
| Round of 16 losers x 8 | 90,000 | 58,730 |
| Third place in pool x 8 | 70,000 | 40,540 |
| Total | €3,400,000 | 2,571,390 |
