= Louis Oosthuizen =

South African professional golfer (born 1982)

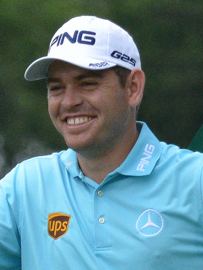
- Oosthuizen at the Greenbrier Classic in 2013

Personal information
- Full name: Lodewicus Theodorus Oosthuizen
- Nickname: Shrek
- Nationality: South Africa
- Born: 19 October 1982 (age 44) Mossel Bay, South Africa
- Height: 5 ft 9 in (1.75 m)
- Weight: 170 lb (77 kg; 12 st)
- Spouse: Nel-Mare Oosthuizen (m. 2007)
- Children: 3

Career
- Sport: Golf
- Turned professional: 2002
- Current tours: Asian Tour; Sunshine Tour; LIV Golf
- Former tours: PGA Tour; European Tour
- Professional wins: 16
- Highest ranking: 4 (13 January 2013)

Number of wins by tour
- PGA Tour: 1
- European Tour: 11
- Asian Tour: 3
- Sunshine Tour: 10
- PGA Tour of Australasia: 1

Best results in major championships (wins: 1)
- Masters Tournament: 2nd: 2012
- PGA Championship: T2: 2017, 2021
- U.S. Open: 2nd/T2: 2015, 2021
- The Open Championship: Won: 2010

Lodewicus Theodorus "Louis" Oosthuizen (Afrikaans pronunciation: [ˈlu.i ˈuəstɦœyzən]; born 19 October 1982) is a South African professional golfer who won the 2010 Open Championship. He has finished runner-up in all four major championships: the 2012 Masters Tournament, the 2015 and 2021 U.S. Open, the 2015 Open Championship, and the PGA Championship in 2017 and 2021. His highest placing on the Official World Golf Ranking is fourth, which he reached in January 2013.

== Early life and amateur career ==
Oosthuizen was born in Mossel Bay, South Africa. His early career was supported financially for three years by the foundation of fellow South African golfer Ernie Els. He won numerous amateur titles before turning professional in 2002 at the age of 19.

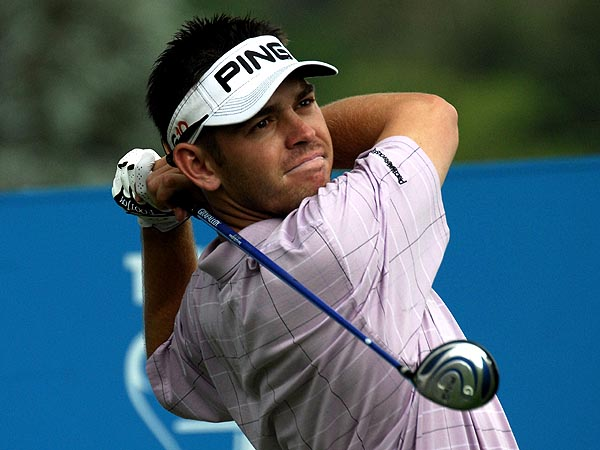
Oosthuizen at the 2008 Telkom PGA Championship

== Professional career ==
=== Sunshine Tour ===
He won five professional tournaments on the Sunshine Tour early in his career: the 2004 Vodacom Origins of Golf Tour event at Arabella, the 2007 Dimension Data Pro-Am and Platinum Classic, and the Telkom PGA Championship twice, in 2007 and 2008.

=== European Tour ===
He played on the European Challenge Tour in 2003 and has been a member of the European Tour since 2004. In 2009, he finished 31st on the Race to Dubai. On 10 September 2012 he reached the top 10 of the Official World Golf Ranking for the first time in his career.

In March 2010, he won his first European Tour event at the Open de Andalucia de Golf. The month after he won the 2010 Masters Par 3 Contest.

Oosthuizen entered the 2010 Open Championship at St Andrews ranked 54th in the Official World Golf Ranking, and only having made one cut in eight major championship appearances. He shot a 65 on the first day, placing him in second place, behind a 63 shot by Rory McIlroy.

Oosthuizen's 67 on Friday was the low round of the day and gave him a lead that he would not relinquish throughout the final two rounds. His two-day total of 132 tied the record for the lowest 36-hole score in an Open Championship at St Andrews. A 69 on Saturday placed Oosthuizen at 15-under-par, and four shots clear of second-place Paul Casey with one round to play.

On Sunday, Casey closed the gap to three shots on the 8th hole, before Oosthuizen drove the 9th green and made a long putt for eagle. On the 12th hole, Oosthuizen made birdie, while Casey hit his drive into a gorse bush, and wound up making triple bogey to give Oosthuizen an eight-shot lead. In the end, Oosthuizen shot 71 on Sunday, and 16-under-par 272 for the championship, to win by seven strokes. His 272 was the second lowest in St Andrews history. Casey eventually finished third with Lee Westwood taking second.

Oosthuizen became the fourth man from South Africa to win the Claret Jug – following Bobby Locke, Gary Player, and Ernie Els – and moved to 15th in the Official World Golf Ranking, leapfrogging fellow South African Retief Goosen in 16th position.

Oosthuizen said that his exemplary focus during the tournament, which enabled him to win by a wide margin, was due to a red spot marked on his glove. He would look at that spot as the beginning of his pre-shot routine and use it to help him remain focused before and during his swing. Oosthuizen had consulted Karl Morris, a Manchester-based sports psychologist, prior to the event for ways in which he could improve his concentration.

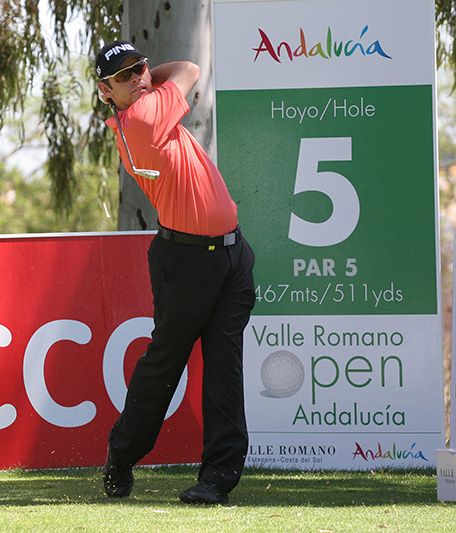
Oosthuizen at the 2007 Valle Romano Open at the Aloha Golf Club, Marbella, Spain

Oosthuizen finished the 2010 season in 10th place on the Race to Dubai, posting three further top-10s after his major win. In January 2011, he claimed his third European Tour title, and his sixth in his home country, winning the Africa Open in a playoff. In 2012, Oosthuizen successfully defended his title at the Africa Open with a two stroke victory over Tjaart van der Walt. His success was helped by a second round 62, which took Oosthuizen to the top of the leaderboard at the halfway stage and from there he held on for victory.

=== PGA Tour ===
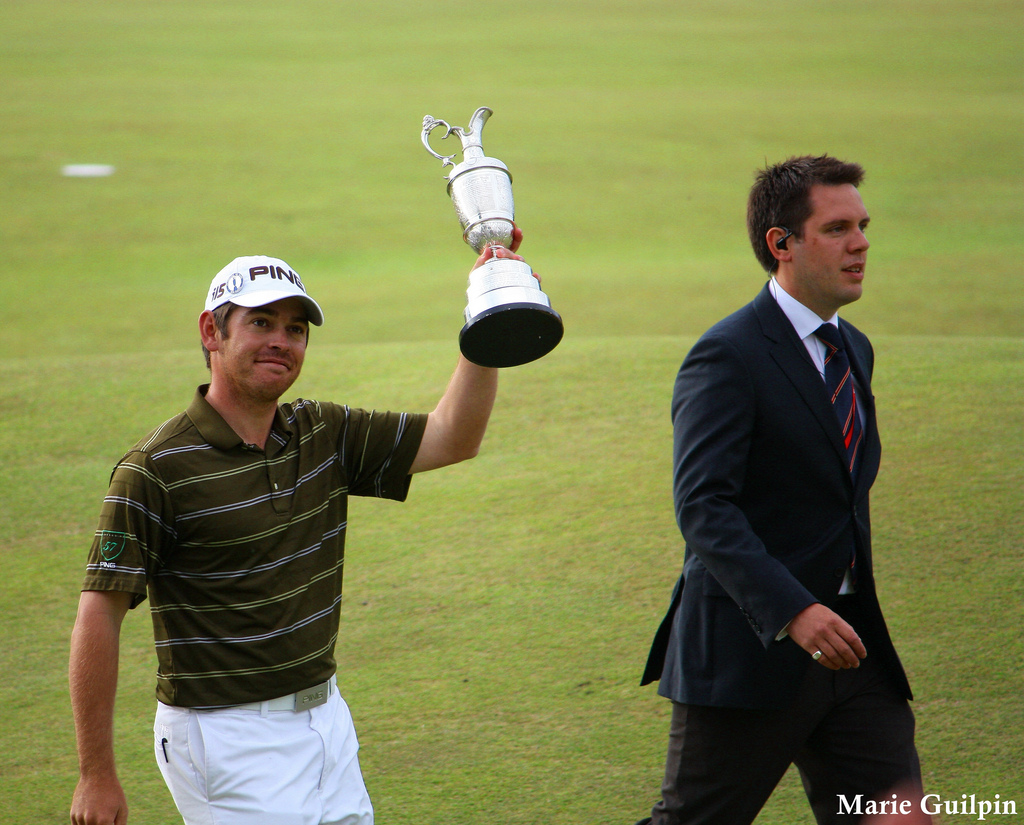
Oosthuizen after winning the 2010 Open Championship at St Andrews.

Oosthuizen was runner-up at the 2012 Masters Tournament. In the final round, he scored an albatross on the second hole of Augusta National Golf Club. This was only the fourth ever albatross in Masters history, and the first to be televised, as well as the first ever on that hole. Oosthuizen took the outright lead of the tournament with this exceptional shot, and maintained the lead until caught on the 16th hole, by Bubba Watson. He was eventually defeated by Watson on the second hole of a sudden-death playoff. He won his fifth European Tour title at the Maybank Malaysian Open the following week. In the second event of the 2012 PGA Tour FedEx Cup Playoffs, the Deutsche Bank Championship, Oosthuizen held the 54-hole lead by three strokes and came close to his first victory on US soil, finishing second to Rory McIlroy by one shot. On 10 September 2012, he reached the top 10 of the Official World Golf Ranking for the first time in his career. He finished the season ranked third on the Race to Dubai.

On 13 January 2013, he won the Volvo Golf Champions, shooting a six-under-par 66 final round to win the title by one stroke.

In January 2014, he retained the Volvo Golf Champions title by one shot over Branden Grace.

Oosthuizen finished as a joint runner-up in the 2015 Open Championship at St Andrews after losing in a four-hole aggregate playoff during a Monday finish to the event. He was in the final group tied for the 54-hole co-lead but needed to birdie the 18th hole during his final round to tie the lead at 15-under and join Zach Johnson and Marc Leishman in the playoff. In the four-hole playoff, he birdied the first hole alongside Johnson, but could not convert his birdie putt on the second hole, giving Johnson a one-stroke advantage. All three players bogeyed the third hole and after Johnson missed his birdie putt on the final hole, Oosthuizen had a 15 footer to extend the playoff to sudden death. However his putt caught the lip on the low side and he finished at even-par, one stroke behind Johnson. This was Oosthuizen's second consecutive runner-up placing in a major championship, following the 2015 U.S. Open.

On 13 August 2017, Oosthuizen finished joint runner-up at the PGA Championship, finishing a career "second-place" Grand Slam.

On 9 December 2018, Oosthuizen won the South African Open. This event was co-sanctioned by the European Tour, Sunshine Tour and the Asian Tour.

In December 2019, Oosthuizen played on the International team at the 2019 Presidents Cup at Royal Melbourne Golf Club in Australia. The U.S. team won 16–14. Oosthuizen went 2–1–1 and lost a 3 up lead to halve his Sunday singles match against Matt Kuchar.

In May 2021, Oosthuizen finished in a tie for second place at the 2021 PGA Championship for his fifth runner-up finish in a major championship. In June, Oosthuizen finished in second place at the 2021 U.S. Open at Torrey Pines Golf Course in La Jolla, California for a sixth major runner-up finish. In July, Oosthuizen finished in a tie for third place at the 2021 Open Championship at Royal St George's Golf Club in Sandwich, Kent, alongside Jon Rahm and behind Jordan Spieth and winner Collin Morikawa.

=== LIV Golf ===
In June 2022, Oosthuizen joined LIV Golf and resigned from the PGA Tour; following the commencement of the first event on 9 June 2022, the PGA Tour suspended all members who were participating in the new series, including those who had resigned, as they had not been granted a release by the tour.

== Amateur wins ==
- 2000 World Junior Championship
- 2001 All African Games (Kenya), Transvaal Amateur Stroke Play Championship (South Africa)
- 2002 Indian Amateur Open Championship (tied), Irish Amateur Open Championship, Natal Open Stroke Play Championship (South Africa)

== Professional wins (16) ==
=== PGA Tour wins (1) ===
Legend
Major championships (1)
Other PGA Tour (0)

No.	Date	Tournament	Winning score	To par	Margin of victory	Runner-up
1	18 Jul 2010	The Open Championship	65-67-69-71=272	−16	7 strokes	(England) Lee Westwood

PGA Tour playoff record (0–3)

No.	Year	Tournament	Opponent(s)	Result
1	2012	Masters Tournament	(United States) Bubba Watson	Lost to par on second extra hole
2	2015	The Open Championship	(United States) Zach Johnson, (Australia) Marc Leishman	Johnson won four-hole aggregate playoff; Johnson: −1 (3-3-5-4=15), Oosthuizen: E (3-4-5-4=16), Leishman: +2 (5-4-5-4=18)
3	2021	Zurich Classic of New Orleans (with (South Africa) Charl Schwartzel)	(Australia) Marc Leishman and (Australia) Cameron Smith	Lost to par on first extra hole

=== European Tour wins (11) ===
Legend
Major championships (1)
Other European Tour (10)

No.	Date	Tournament	Winning score	To par	Margin of victory	Runner(s)-up
1	28 Mar 2010	Open de Andalucía de Golf	67-63-66-67=263	−17	3 strokes	(England) Richard Finch, (Scotland) Peter Whiteford
2	18 Jul 2010	The Open Championship	65-67-69-71=272	−16	7 strokes	(England) Lee Westwood
3	9 Jan 2011	Africa Open^{1}	70-67-69-70=276	−16	Playoff	(Spain) Manuel Quirós, (England) Chris Wood
4	8 Jan 2012	Africa Open^{1} (2)	69-62-67-67=265	−27	2 strokes	(South Africa) Tjaart van der Walt
5	15 Apr 2012	Maybank Malaysian Open^{2}	66-68-69-68=271	−17	3 strokes	(Scotland) Stephen Gallacher
6	13 Jan 2013	Volvo Golf Champions	68-64-74-66=272	−16	1 stroke	(Scotland) Scott Jamieson
7	12 Jan 2014	Volvo Golf Champions (2)	68-69-71-68=276	−12	1 stroke	(South Africa) Branden Grace
8	28 Feb 2016	ISPS Handa Perth International^{2,3}	70-64-67-71=272	−16	1 stroke	(France) Alexander Lévy
9	9 Dec 2018 (2019 season)	South African Open^{1,2}	62-70-67-67=266	−18	6 strokes	(France) Romain Langasque
10	11 Dec 2023 (2024 season)	Alfred Dunhill Championship^{1}	70-68-63-69=270	−18	2 strokes	(South Africa) Charl Schwartzel
11	17 Dec 2023 (2024 season)	AfrAsia Bank Mauritius Open^{1}	68-69-65-69=271	−17	2 strokes	(England) Laurie Canter

^{1}Co-sanctioned by the Sunshine Tour
^{2}Co-sanctioned by the Asian Tour
^{3}Co-sanctioned by the PGA Tour of Australasia

European Tour playoff record (1–3)

No.	Year	Tournament	Opponent(s)	Result
1	2011	Africa Open	(Spain) Manuel Quirós, (England) Chris Wood	Won with birdie on first extra hole
2	2012	Masters Tournament	(United States) Bubba Watson	Lost to par on second extra hole
3	2012	Barclays Singapore Open	(Italy) Matteo Manassero	Lost to eagle on third extra hole
4	2015	The Open Championship	(United States) Zach Johnson, (Australia) Marc Leishman	Johnson won four-hole aggregate playoff; Johnson: −1 (3-3-5-4=15), Oosthuizen: E (3-4-5-4=16), Leishman: +2 (5-4-5-4=18)

=== Asian Tour wins (3) ===
No.	Date	Tournament	Winning score	To par	Margin of victory	Runner-up
1	15 Apr 2012	Maybank Malaysian Open^{1}	66-68-69-68=271	−17	3 strokes	(Scotland) Stephen Gallacher
2	28 Feb 2016	ISPS Handa Perth International^{1,2}	70-64-67-71=272	−16	1 stroke	(France) Alexander Lévy
3	9 Dec 2018	South African Open^{1,3}	62-70-67-67=266	−18	6 strokes	(France) Romain Langasque

^{1}Co-sanctioned by the European Tour
^{2}Co-sanctioned by the PGA Tour of Australasia
^{3}Co-sanctioned by the Sunshine Tour

Asian Tour playoff record (0–1)

No.	Year	Tournament	Opponent	Result
1	2012	Barclays Singapore Open	(Italy) Matteo Manassero	Lost to eagle on third extra hole

=== Sunshine Tour wins (10) ===
Legend
Flagship events (1)
Other Sunshine Tour (9)

No.	Date	Tournament	Winning score	To par	Margin of victory	Runner(s)-up
1	19 Sep 2004	Vodacom Origins of Golf at Arabella	74-70-71=215	−1	1 stroke	(South Africa) Keith Horne
2	28 Jan 2007	Dimension Data Pro-Am	66-71-71-69=277	−11	1 stroke	(South Africa) Omar Sandys
3	25 Feb 2007	Telkom PGA Championship	67-65-69-65=266	−22	1 stroke	(South Africa) Richard Sterne
4	27 Oct 2007	Platinum Classic	64-71-70=205	−11	Playoff	(Zimbabwe) Marc Cayeux, (Brazil) Adilson da Silva
5	24 Feb 2008	Telkom PGA Championship (2)	66-63-66-65=260	−28	14 strokes	(South Africa) Hennie Otto
6	9 Jan 2011	Africa Open^{1}	70-67-69-70=276	−16	Playoff	(Spain) Manuel Quirós, (England) Chris Wood
7	8 Jan 2012	Africa Open^{1} (2)	69-62-67-67=265	−27	2 strokes	(South Africa) Tjaart van der Walt
8	9 Dec 2018	South African Open^{1,2}	62-70-67-67=266	−18	6 strokes	(France) Romain Langasque
9	11 Dec 2023	Alfred Dunhill Championship^{1}	70-68-63-69=270	−18	2 strokes	(South Africa) Charl Schwartzel
10	17 Dec 2023	AfrAsia Bank Mauritius Open^{1}	68-69-65-69=271	−17	2 strokes	(England) Laurie Canter

^{1}Co-sanctioned by the European Tour
^{2}Co-sanctioned by the Asian Tour

Sunshine Tour playoff record (2–1)

No.	Year	Tournament	Opponent(s)	Result
1	2007	Vodacom Championship	(South Africa) Richard Sterne	Lost to birdie on second extra hole
2	2007	Platinum Classic	(Zimbabwe) Marc Cayeux, (Brazil) Adilson da Silva	Won with par on second extra hole da Silva eliminated by par on first hole
3	2011	Africa Open	(Spain) Manuel Quirós, (England) Chris Wood	Won with birdie on first extra hole

== Playoff record ==
LIV Golf League playoff record (0–2)

No.	Year	Tournament	Opponents	Result
1	2023	LIV Golf Tucson	(New Zealand) Danny Lee, (Mexico) Carlos Ortiz, (United States) Brendan Steele	Lee won with birdie on second extra hole Ortiz eliminated by par on first hole
2	2025	LIV Golf Dallas	(England) Paul Casey, (Japan) Jinichiro Kozuma, (United States) Patrick Reed	Reed won with birdie on first extra hole

== Major championships ==
=== Wins (1) ===
Year	Championship	54 holes	Winning score	Margin	Runner-up
2010	The Open Championship	4 shot lead	−16 (65-67-69-71=272)	7 strokes	(England) Lee Westwood

=== Results timeline ===
Results not in chronological order in 2020.

Tournament	2004	2005	2006	2007	2008	2009
Masters Tournament						CUT
U.S. Open						
The Open Championship	CUT		CUT			CUT
PGA Championship					73	CUT

Tournament	2010	2011	2012	2013	2014	2015	2016	2017	2018
Masters Tournament	CUT	CUT	2	CUT	25	T19	T15	T41	T12
U.S. Open	CUT	T9	CUT	WD	T40	T2	T23	T23	T16
The Open Championship	1	T54	T19	WD	T36	T2	CUT	CUT	T28
PGA Championship	CUT	CUT	T21		T15	T30	T22	T2	

Tournament	2019	2020	2021	2022	2023	2024	2025
Masters Tournament	T29	T23	T26	WD	WD		
PGA Championship	T60	T33	T2	T60			
U.S. Open	T7	3	2	CUT			
The Open Championship	T20	NT	T3	CUT	T23	CUT	CUT

Win
Top 10
Did not play

CUT = missed the half-way cut
WD = withdrew
"T" = tied
NT = no tournament due to COVID-19 pandemic

=== Summary ===
Tournament	Wins	2nd	3rd	Top-5	Top-10	Top-25	Events	Cuts made
Masters Tournament	0	1	0	1	1	6	15	9
PGA Championship	0	2	0	2	2	5	13	10
U.S. Open	0	2	1	3	5	8	13	9
The Open Championship	1	1	1	3	3	6	18	9
Totals	1	6	2	9	11	25	59	37

- Most consecutive cuts made – 15 (2017 PGA – 2021 Open Championship)
- Longest streak of top-10s – 3 (2021 PGA – 2021 Open Championship)

== Results in The Players Championship ==
Tournament	2011	2012	2013	2014	2015	2016	2017	2018	2019
The Players Championship	CUT	CUT	T19	CUT	T69	T28	T2	CUT	T56

Tournament	2020	2021	2022
The Players Championship	C	T41	T42

Top 10

CUT = missed the halfway cut
"T" indicates a tie for a place
C = Cancelled after the first round due to the COVID-19 pandemic

== Results in World Golf Championships ==
Results not in chronological order before 2015.

Tournament	2006	2007	2008	2009	2010	2011	2012	2013	2014	2015	2016	2017	2018	2019	2020	2021	2022
Championship	T32	T50	T68	T20		T18	T60	T33	T40	6	T14	T48	T30	T25	T51	T6	
Match Play				R64		R64	R32	R32	QF	QF	2	T17	R16	QF	NT^{1}	T61	T35
Invitational					T9	T37	4		61	T42	T21	T50	T24	T20	T6	T17	
Champions					T72	T7	T6	T15	T14	T44	T45			3	NT^{1}	NT^{1}	NT^{1}

^{1}Cancelled due to COVID-19 pandemic

Top 10
Did not play

QF, R16, R32, R64 = Round in which player lost in match play
NT = no tournament
"T" = tied
Note that the HSBC Champions did not become a WGC event until 2009.
Note that the Championship and Invitational were discontinued from 2022.

== Team appearances ==
Amateur

- Eisenhower Trophy (representing South Africa): 2002

Professional

- World Cup (representing South Africa): 2011
- Presidents Cup (representing the International team): 2013, 2015, 2017, 2019

== See also ==
- 2005 European Tour Qualifying School graduates
- List of golfers with most European Tour wins
