= NAIA men's golf championship =

- Sport: Golf
- Founded: 1952
- Country: United States and Canada
- Most recent champion: Oklahoma City
- Website: NAIA.com

The NAIA men's golf championship is the annual tournament to determine the national champions of men's NAIA collegiate golf in the United States and Canada. It has been held each year since 1952.

The most successful program is Oklahoma City, with 12 NAIA national titles and is the reigning national champion.

== Results ==
NAIA men's golf championships
Year	Site	Host course	Team championship				Individual champion	Score
Year	Site	Host course	Champion	Score	Runner-up	Score	Individual champion	Score
1952	Abilene, TX	Abilene Country Club	North Texas State	1123	Hardin–Simmons	1171	Marion Hiskey (North Texas State)	–
1953	Abilene, TX	Abilene Country Club	Hardin–Simmons	570	North Texas State	576	Tommy Hale (Hardin–Simmons)	–
1954	Abilene, TX	Abilene Country Club	North Texas State	556	Hardin–Simmons	564	Marion Hiskey (North Texas State)	–
1955	Abilene, TX	Abilene Country Club	North Texas State	569	Hardin–Simmons	584	Ray Ferguson (North Texas State)	–
1956	San Diego, CA	Mission Valley Country Club	Lamar Tech	591	San Diego State	619	Bunky Johnson (Lamar Tech)	–
1957	Beaumont, TX	Tyrell Park Country Club	Lamar Tech	1178	Rollins	1196	Jim Curti (Rollins)	–
1958	Beaumont, TX	Tyrell Park Country Club	Lamar Tech	1162	Central State (OK)	1219	Eddie Langer (Lamar Tech)	–
1959	Quincy, IL	Quincy Country Club	Western Illinois	1186	Lamar Tech	1192	Jim King (Western Illinois)	282
1960	Bemidji, MN	Bemidji Country Club	Lamar Tech	1185	Central State (OK)	1192	Bill Wright (Western Washington)	285
1961	Shawnee, OK	Elks Country Club	Lamar Tech	1164	Texas Wesleyan	1187	Bill Levely (Lamar Tech)	287
1962	Davenport, IA	Emeis Park and Golf Course	Western Illinois	1210	Texas Wesleyan	1216	Steve Spray (Eastern New Mexico)	290
1963	Kansas City, MO	Swope Memorial Golf Course	Eastern New Mexico	1191	Washburn	1197	Steve Spray (Eastern New Mexico)	288
1964	Fort Worth, TX	Meadowbrook Country Club	Texas Wesleyan	1197	Appalachian State	1220	Craig Mertz (East Texas State)	294
1965	Rockford, IL	Rockford Country Club	East Texas State	1201	Eastern New Mexico	1202	Craig Mertz (East Texas State)	282
1966	Shawnee, OK	Elks Country Club	Southwestern Louisiana	1178	Western Illinois	1205	Don Iverson (Wisconsin State–La Crosse)	282
1967	Davenport, IA	Emeis Park and Golf Course	Southwestern Louisiana	1177	Detroit College	1192	John Bohmann (Texas Lutheran)	286
1968	Bemidji, MN	Bemidji Country Club	IUP	1162	Detroit College	1192	Rick Hrip (IUP)	287
1969	Fort Worth, TX	Meadowbrook Country Club	Texas Wesleyan	1192	Appalachian State	1206	Ken Hyland (Malone)	290
1970	Liberty, MO	Claycrest Country Club	Campbell	1209	Southwest Texas State	1213	Jimmy Chapman (Southwest Texas State)	297
1971	Rockford, IL	Rockford Country Club	St. Bernard	1192	Columbus (GA)	1197	Sammy Rachels (Columbus (GA))	290
1972	Roswell, NM	New Mexico Military Institute Golf Course	U.S. International	1147	Columbus (GA)	1150	Gaylord Burrows (Eastern Illinois) & Jim McAnally (Angelo State)	283
1973	Gramling, SC	Village Green Country Club	Wofford	875	Campbell	889	Jay Overton (Campbell) & Mike Zack (St. Bernard)	213
1974	Aberdeen, SD	Prairiewood Country Club	U.S. International	1212	St. Bernard	1215	Dan Frickey (Washburn)	294
1975	Fort Worth, TX	Woodhaven Country Club	Texas Wesleyan	1192	Sam Houston State	1195	Dan Gray (Texas Wesleyan)	288
1976	Burlington, NC	Alamance Country Club	Gardner–Webb	1193	Elon	1194	Will Brewer (David Lipscomb)	289
1977	Bay City, MI	Bay Valley Country Club	Gardner–Webb	1190	Sam Houston State	1200	Jim Bromley (Campbell)	284
1978	Huntsville, TX	Elkins Lake Country Club	Sam Houston State	1206	Elon	1222	Greg Brown (Point Loma)	290
1979	Greensboro, NC	Cardinal Country Club	Sam Houston State	1168	Gardner–Webb	1196	Robert Thompson (Sam Houston State)	284
1980	Bay City, MI	Bay Valley Country Club	Sam Houston State	1172	Texas Wesleyan & IUP	1194	Tom Allbright (Sam Houston State) & Danny Mijovic (Texas Wesleyan)	284
1981	Huntsville, TX	Waterford National Country Club	Sam Houston State	882	Texas Wesleyan	896	Danny Mijovic (Texas Wesleyan)	216
1982	Burlington, NC	Alamance Country Club	Elon	1179	Texas Wesleyan	1185	Danny Mijovic (Texas Wesleyan)	286
1983	Fort Worth, TX	Woodhaven Country Club	Cameron	1141	Texas Wesleyan	1148	Dow Brian (Texas Wesleyan), Bill Brooks (Guilford), & Danny Mijovic (Texas Wesleyan)	280
1984	Bay City, MI	Bay Valley Country Club	Limestone	1176	Saginaw Valley State	1183	Chip Johnson (Limestone)	285
1985	Phoenix, AZ	Goodyear Country Club	Huntingdon	1166	Guilford	1186	Dan Penny (Huntingdon)	288
1986	Montgomery, AL	Oak Hollow Country Club	Huntingdon	1170	Guilford	1176	Jon Hough (Kennesaw) & Rob Odom (Guilford)	286
1987	Angola, IN	Zollner Country Club	Huntingdon	1137	Guilford	1162	Joe Durant (Huntingdon)	277
1988	Montgomery, AL	Wynlakes Country Club	Huntingdon	1149	Mobile	1172	David Schreyer (Huntingdon)	279
1989	Bay City, MI	Bay Valley Country Club	Guilford	1187	Huntingdon	1193	Nicky Martin (Huntingdon)	285
1990	Angola, IN	Zollner Country Club	Texas Wesleyan	1171	Texas Lutheran	1190	Andy Fuller (Texas Wesleyan)	286
1991	Oklahoma City, OK	Twin Hills Golf & Country Club	North Florida	1200	Oklahoma City	1221	Cameron Beckman (Texas Lutheran)	295
1992	Angola, IN	Zollner Country Club	Huntingdon	1152	North Florida	1161	Jamie Burns (North Florida) & Scott Gardner (Cumberland (KY))	278
1993	Ponte Vedra Beach, FL	TPC at Sawgrass	North Florida	1139	Glenville State & Huntingdon	1194	Jamie Burns (North Florida)	281
1994	Tulsa, OK	Tulsa Country Club	Huntingdon	1173	Berry	1181	Henrik Nyström (Lynn)	277
1995	Owasso, OK	Bailey Ranch Golf Club	Texas Wesleyan	1181	West Florida	1182	Steve Armstrong (Pfeiffer)	278
1996	Broken Arrow, OK	The Club at Indian Springs	Lynn	1205	Berry	1206	Steve Galko (Texas Wesleyan)	290
1997	Tulsa, OK	Tulsa Country Club	Mobile	1152	Huntingdon	1182	Keith Hoard (Spring Hill)	282
1998	Tulsa, OK	Southern Hills Country Club	Berry	1196	Texas Wesleyan	1197	Chris Gaines (Texas Wesleyan)	294
1999	Palm Beach Gardens, FL	PGA National	Texas Wesleyan	1177	Simon Fraser	1189	Brent Osachoff (Simon Fraser)	289
2000	Albuquerque, NM	Isleta Eagle Golf Club	Malone	1151	Berry	1158	David Tuyo (Mobile)	282
2001	Albuquerque, NM	Isleta Eagle Golf Club	Oklahoma City	1176	Oklahoma Christian	1184	Justin Walters (Huntingdon)	284
2002	Palm Coast, FL	Matanzas Woods Golf Club	Oklahoma City	900	Berry	904	Tyrone van Aswegen (Oklahoma City)	218
2003	Palm Coast, FL	Matanzas Woods Golf Club	Oklahoma City	1164	Berry	1176	Nicolas Allain (Oklahoma City)	282
2004	Olathe, KS	Prairie Highlands Golf Club	Oklahoma City	1170	Johnson & Wales (FL)	1180	Chad Wensel (The Master's)	283
2005	Olathe, KS	Prairie Highlands Golf Club	Johnson & Wales (FL)	1133	Oklahoma Christian	1161	Jim Renner (Johnson & Wales (FL))	281
2006	Olathe, KS	Prairie Highlands Golf Club	Oklahoma City	1154	Johnson & Wales	1170	Joe Prince (Point Loma Nazarene)	284
2007	Plymouth, IN	Indiana National Golf Club	Oklahoma City	1154	Wayland Baptist	1172	Daniel Mitchell (Oklahoma City)	282
2008	Plymouth, IN	Indiana National Golf Club	British Columbia	1156	Oklahoma Christian	1168	Sam Cyr (Point Loma Nazarene)	280
2009	Silvis, IL	TPC at Deere Run	Oklahoma Christian	1181	Texas Wesleyan	1185	Sam Cyr (Point Loma Nazarene)	282
2010	Silvis, IL	TPC at Deere Run	Oklahoma City	1184	Oklahoma Christian	1189	Justin Lower (Malone)	280
2011	Silvis, IL	TPC at Deere Run	Oklahoma Christian	1150	British Columbia	1172	Oscar Stark (Oklahoma Christian)	280
2012	Salem, Ore.	Creekside Golf Club	Oklahoma City	1176	Oklahoma Christian	1179	Carson Kallis (Victoria)	283
2013	Salem, Ore.	Creekside Golf Club	Oklahoma City	1148	Texas Wesleyan	1176	Sondre Ronold (Oklahoma City)	283
2014	Daytona Beach, FL	LPGA International	Coastal Georgia	865	Oklahoma City	869	James Marchesani (Oklahoma City)	211
2015	Daytona Beach, FL	LPGA International	Coastal Georgia	1145	William Woods	1156	Sean Elliott (Dalton State)	272
2016	Silvis, IL	TPC at Deere Run	Oklahoma City	1164	British Columbia	1172	David Ravetto (Texas Wesleyan)	281
2017	Silvis, IL	TPC at Deere Run	Grand View	1197	Cardinal Stritch	1202	Rowan Lester (Texas Wesleyan)	287
2018	Silvis, IL	TPC at Deere Run	Oklahoma City	1127	Dalton State	1140	S. M. Lee (Dalton State)	272
2019	Mesa, AZ	Las Sendas Golf Club	Texas Wesleyan	1166	Coastal Georgia	1175	Mark Johnson (Coastal Georgia)	286
2020	Not held due to the COVID-19 pandemic							
2021	Silvis, IL	TPC at Deere Run	Dalton State	1171	Texas Wesleyan	1172	Corey Matthey (Morningside)	280
2022	Silvis, IL	TPC at Deere Run	Keiser	1130	Dalton State	1133	Jakob Stavang Stubhaug (Keiser)	276
2023	Mesa, AZ	Las Sendas Golf Club	British Columbia	1157	The Master's	1160	Easton Johnson (The Master's)	280
2024	Dalton, GA	Dalton Country Club	Dalton State	1182	Texas Wesleyan	1183	Juan Ricardo Dávila (Texas Wesleyan)	288
2025	Silvis, IL	TPC at Deere Run	Lindsey Wilson	862	Oklahoma City	864	Jack Whaley; Dalton State	205
2026	Silvis, IL	TPC at Deere Run	Oklahoma City	1153	Friends	1155	Christian Yanovitch; Oklahoma City	280

== Team titles ==
The following schools have won an NAIA team championship:

Team	NAIA titles	Years won
Oklahoma City	12	2001, 2002, 2003, 2004, 2006, 2007, 2010, 2012, 2013, 2016, 2018, 2026
Texas Wesleyan	7	1964, 1969, 1975, 1990, 1995, 1999, 2019
Huntingdon	6	1985, 1986, 1987, 1988, 1992, 1994
Lamar Tech	5	1956, 1957, 1958, 1960, 1961
Sam Houston State	4	1978, 1979, 1980, 1981
North Texas State	3	1952, 1954, 1955
British Columbia	2	2008, 2023
Coastal Georgia	2	2014, 2015
Gardner–Webb	2	1976, 1977
North Florida	2	1991, 1993
Oklahoma Christian	2	2009, 2011
Southwestern Louisiana	2	1966, 1967
US International	2	1972, 1974
Western Illinois	2	1959, 1962
Dalton State	2	2021, 2024
Berry	1	1998
Cameron	1	1983
Campbell	1	1970
East Texas State	1	1965
Eastern New Mexico	1	1963
Elon	1	1982
Grand View	1	2017
Hardin–Simmons	1	1953
Indiana (PA)	1	1968
Johnson & Wales (FL)	1	2005
Keiser	1	2022
Limestone	1	1984
Lindsey Wilson	1	2025
Lynn	1	1996
Malone	1	2000
Mobile	1	1997
St. Bernard	1	1971
Indiana (PA)	1	1968
Wofford	1	1973

== Multiple winners ==
=== Individual champion ===
The following men have won more than one individual championship:

- 4: Danny Mijovic
- 2: Jamie Burns, Sam Cyr, Marion Hiskey, Craig Mertz, Steve Spray

=== Individual champion's school ===
The following schools have produced more than one individual champion:

- 12 champions: Texas Wesleyan
- 6 champions: Oklahoma City
- 5 champions: Huntingdon
- 4 champions: Point Loma Nazarene
- 3 champions: Dalton State, Lamar Tech, North Texas State
- 2 champions: Campbell, East Texas State, Eastern New Mexico, Guilford, Malone, The Master's, North Florida, Sam Houston State, Texas Lutheran

== See also ==
- NAIA women's golf championship
- NCAA men's golf championships (Division I, Division II, Division III)
