= Oscar Stark =

Swedish professional golfer

Personal information
- Nationality: Sweden
- Born: 1 November 1988 (age 38) Kungsbacka, Sweden
- Height: 6 ft 0 in (183 cm)

Career
- Sport: Golf
- College: Oklahoma Christian University
- Turned professional: 2012
- Former tours: Challenge Tour; NGA Pro Golf Tour
- Professional wins: 1

Number of wins by tour
- Challenge Tour: 1

Achievements and awards
- NAIA Arnold Palmer Medalist Award: 2011
- Jack Nicklaus Player of the Year Award: 2011

Oscar Stark (born 1 November 1988) is a retired Swedish professional golfer. He played on the Challenge Tour 2014–2019 and won the 2017 Made in Denmark Challenge. As an amateur he won the 2011 NAIA Men's Golf Championship held at TPC Deere Run in Illinois.

== Amateur career ==
Stark grew up in Kungsbacka and was introduced to golf by his father at Forsgården Golf Club when he was 10. He competed on the Swedish junior circuits from 2004 and collected a number of titles. He later came to represent Vallda Golf & Country Club.

Stark attended Oklahoma Christian University between 2008 and 2011 and excelled playing with the Oklahoma Christian Eagles golf team. He won four individual titles and was a four-time NAIA All-America selection, receiving first-team honors the final three years. He helped OCU win the NAIA national title in 2009 and 2011, and as a senior in 2011 he received the NAIA Arnold Palmer Medalist Award and Jack Nicklaus Player of the Year Award, after winning the NAIA Men's Golf Championship individually.

== Professional career ==
After graduating, Stark played golf in North America for another two years and spent 2012 and 2013 on the NGA Pro Golf Tour, before qualifying for the Challenge Tour at the 2013 European Q-School, falling two strokes short of direct qualification to the European Tour.

On the 2016 Challenge Tour, Stark was runner-up at the Cordon Golf Open in France a stroke behind Álvaro Velasco and recorded two further top-5 finishes at the Swiss Challenge and the Hainan Open, to finish a career-best 31st in the Order of Merit. He secured his first Challenge Tour victory at the Made in Denmark Challenge in 2017. He made a career total of 13 starts on the European Tour where his best finish was a tie for 16th at the 2016 D+D Real Czech Masters.

== Amateur wins ==
- 2004 Ericsson Junior Tour - Göteborg
- 2005 FSB Tour Regional #3 - Göteborg
- 2006 Chalmers Junior Open
- 2011 NAIA Men's Golf Championship

== Professional wins (1) ==
=== Challenge Tour wins (1) ===
No.	Date	Tournament	Winning score	Margin of victory	Runners-up
1	25 Jun 2017	Made in Denmark Challenge	−14 (66-67-72-69=274)	2 strokes	(Germany) Dominic Foos, (France) Victor Perez, (France) Adrien Saddier
