= Calum Hill =

Scottish professional golfer (born 1994)

Personal information
- Full name: Calum Edward Hill
- Nationality: Scotland
- Born: 3 November 1994 (age 31) Kirkcaldy, Scotland

Career
- Sport: Golf
- College: Western New Mexico University
- Turned professional: 2017
- Current tour: European Tour
- Former tour: Challenge Tour
- Professional wins: 7
- Highest ranking: 97 (15 August 2021) (as of 25 October 2026)

Number of wins by tour
- European Tour: 2
- Sunshine Tour: 1
- Challenge Tour: 3
- Other: 2

Best results in major championships
- Masters Tournament: DNP
- PGA Championship: DNP
- U.S. Open: 61st: 2018
- The Open Championship: DNP

Calum Edward Hill (born 3 November 1994) is a Scottish professional golfer who plays on the European Tour. He won the 2021 Cazoo Classic on the European Tour and has three wins on the Challenge Tour.

== Amateur career ==
Hill attended the Western New Mexico University in Silver City, New Mexico from 2012 to 2016. In May 2016, he played in the NCAA Division II Men's Golf Championships, finishing runner-up in the individual competition. After graduating with a degree in accounting he stayed on for a further two years, completing a Masters in Business Administration (MBA). During this period he was an assistant golf coach for the university team. He turned professional in April 2017.

== Professional career ==
Hill played a limited number of events while studying for his MBA. In 2017 he won the San Juan Open and the Arizona Open. In 2018 he came through sectional qualifying to qualify for the U.S. Open. He made the cut and finished in 61st place.

From mid-2018, Hill played on the Challenge Tour, making his debut at the Le Vaudreuil Golf Challenge in July. In August, making just his 5th start on the tour, he won the Galgorm Resort & Spa Northern Ireland Open beating Scott Henry and Stuart Manley by a stroke. Henry had seemed the likely winner but dropped four shots on the last three holes. Hill had earlier made four birdies in the final five holes, making a last round 64. He had three other top-10 finishes and ended the season 35th in the Order of Merit.

In July 2019, Hill played in the Aberdeen Standard Investments Scottish Open on the European Tour, finishing tied for 26th place. The following week he had his second Challenge Tour success, winning the Euram Bank Open by four shots and then won the Made in Denmark Challenge in August. He finished the season in second place in the Challenge Tour Order of Merit to gain a place on the European Tour for 2020. In 2020, his first season on the European Tour, Hill finished 101st in the Order of Merit with two top-10 finishes.

In August 2021, Hill won his first European Tour event at the Cazoo Classic. He shot a final-round 67 to finish one shot ahead of Alexander Lévy. The win moved him into the top 100 of the World Rankings for the first time.

In March 2025, Hill claimed his second European Tour title at the Joburg Open in South Africa. He beat Jacques Kruyswijk and Shaun Norris in a sudden-death playoff.

== Amateur wins ==
- 2016 St. Edward's Invitational, RMAC Spring Championship

== Professional wins (7) ==
=== European Tour wins (2) ===
No.	Date	Tournament	Winning score	Margin of victory	Runner(s)-up
1	15 Aug 2021	Cazoo Classic	−16 (68-67-70-67=272)	1 stroke	(France) Alexander Lévy
2	9 Mar 2025	Joburg Open^{1}	−14 (69-66-69-62=266)	Playoff	(South Africa) Jacques Kruyswijk, (South Africa) Shaun Norris

^{1}Co-sanctioned by the Sunshine Tour

European Tour playoff record (1–1)

No.	Year	Tournament	Opponents	Result
1	2025	Joburg Open	(South Africa) Jacques Kruyswijk, (South Africa) Shaun Norris	Won with par on second extra hole
2	2026	Bapco Energies Bahrain Championship	(United States) Patrick Reed, (Germany) Freddy Schott	Schott won with par on second extra hole Reed eliminated by par on first hole

=== Challenge Tour wins (3) ===
No.	Date	Tournament	Winning score	Margin of victory	Runner(s)-up
1	19 Aug 2018	Galgorm Resort & Spa Northern Ireland Open	−19 (66-67-68-64=265)	1 stroke	(Scotland) Scott Henry, (Wales) Stuart Manley
2	21 Jul 2019	Euram Bank Open	−18 (65-64-67-66=262)	4 strokes	(Scotland) Ewen Ferguson, (Portugal) José-Filipe Lima
3	10 Aug 2019	Made in Denmark Challenge	−22 (67-68-64-67=266)	1 stroke	(Sweden) Joel Sjöholm

=== Other wins (2) ===
No.	Date	Tournament	Winning score	Margin of victory	Runner-up
1	25 Jun 2017	San Juan Open	−21 (66-67-65-65=265)	9 strokes	(United States) Steven Kupcho
2	19 Aug 2017	Arizona Open	−10 (66-66-68=200)	4 strokes	(United States) Brian Cooper

== Results in major championships ==
Tournament	2018
Masters Tournament	
U.S. Open	61
The Open Championship	
PGA Championship	

Did not play

== Team appearances ==
Amateur

- European Boys' Team Championship (representing Scotland): 2013

== See also ==
- 2019 Challenge Tour graduates
