= 2017 Challenge Tour graduates =

This is a list of players who graduated from the Challenge Tour in 2017. The top 15 players on the Challenge Tour rankings in 2017 earned European Tour cards for 2018.

	2017 Challenge Tour		2018 European Tour				
Player	Road to Oman rank	Points	Starts	Cuts made	Best finish	Money list rank	Earnings (€)
(Finland) Tapio Pulkkanen*	1	210,799	28	14	T3	78	580,332
(France) Clément Sordet*	2	181,312	27	13	T10	132	257,550
(South Africa) Erik van Rooyen*	3	160,876	25	18	2	38	1,178,064
(England) Aaron Rai*	4	139,435	32	20	T5	58	777,642
(Sweden) Marcus Kinhult	5	139,419	27	20	3	49	966,558
(France) Julien Guerrier	6	137,525	28	19	3	86	534,524
(Wales) Oliver Farr	7	133,768	29	13	T7	145	222,025
(England) Ryan Evans	8	126,676	29	17	T11	148	208,377
(United States) Chase Koepka*	9	123,570	28	10	T7	181	100,241
(Spain) Pedro Oriol	10	105,108	26	12	T8	151	205,782
(Sweden) Jens Dantorp	11	104,737	30	17	T3	70	620,978
(England) Steven Brown*	12	104,155	28	14	T2	97	404,685
(France) Adrien Saddier	13	100,843	27	14	T7	117	312,632
(Spain) Scott Fernández*	14	94,673	29	11	T7	160	181,159
(Scotland) Bradley Neil*	15	93,168	29	11	T21	190	87,638

* European Tour rookie in 2018
T = Tied
The player retained his European Tour card for 2019 (finished inside the top 116).
The player did not retain his European Tour card for 2019, but retained conditional status (finished between 117 and 155, inclusive).
The player did not retain his European Tour card for 2019 (finished outside the top 155).

Rai earned promotion to the European Tour in July after his third Challenge Tour win of the season.

== Runners-up on the European Tour in 2018 ==
No.	Date	Player	Tournament	Winner	Winning score	Runner-up score
1	11 Dec 2017	(South Africa) Erik van Rooyen	Joburg Open	(India) Shubhankar Sharma	−23 (69-61-65-69=264)	−20 (64-67-70-66=267)
2	2 Sep	(England) Steven Brown lost in four-man playoff	Made in Denmark	(England) Matt Wallace	−19 (68-68-66-67=269)	−19 (70-68-63-68=269)

== See also ==
- 2017 European Tour Qualifying School graduates
