= D+D Real Czech Challenge =

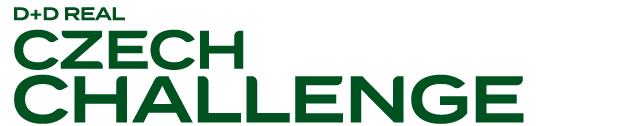

Tournament information
- Location: Beroun, Czech Republic
- Established: 2012
- Course: Royal Beroun Golf Club
- Par: 70
- Length: 6,486 yards (5,931 m)
- Tour: Challenge Tour
- Format: Stroke play
- Prize fund: €300,000
- Month played: July

Tournament record score
- Aggregate: 252 Benjamin Follett-Smith (2024)
- To par: −28 as above

Current champion
- (Scotland) David Law

Location map
- Location in the Czech Republic

The D+D Real Czech Challenge is a golf tournament on the Challenge Tour played in the Czech Republic. From 2012 to 2018, and in 2021 and 2022 it was played at the Golf&Spa Kunětická Hora in Dříteč. It moved to the Kaskáda Golf Resort, near Kuřim, in 2019.

== Winners ==
| Year | Winner | Score | To par | Margin of victory | Runner(s)-up | Venue |
D+D Real Czech Challenge
| 2025 | (Scotland) David Law | 258 | −22 | 2 strokes | (England) Jack Floydd (Scotland) Ryan Lumsden (Austria) Maximilian Steinlechner (Denmark) Victor Sidal Svendsen | Royal Beroun |
| 2024 | (Zimbabwe) Benjamin Follett-Smith | 252 | −28 | 5 strokes | (France) Maxence Giboudot (Finland) Oliver Lindell | Royal Beroun |
| 2023 | (Italy) Andrea Pavan | 270 | −18 | 1 stroke | (South Africa) Casey Jarvis | Panorama Resort |
| 2022 | (Denmark) Nicolai Kristensen | 266 | −14 | Playoff | (France) Ugo Coussaud | Kunětická Hora |
| 2021 | (Spain) Santiago Tarrío | 271 | −17 | Playoff | (France) Julien Brun (Norway) Kristian Krogh Johannessen | Kunětická Hora |
| 2020 | Cancelled due to the COVID-19 pandemic | | | | | |
| 2019 | (England) Ross McGowan | 266 | −18 | 4 strokes | (Portugal) Ricardo Santos | Kunětická Hora |
| 2018 | (South Korea) Kim Min-kyu | 268 | −20 | 3 strokes | (Sweden) Sebastian Söderberg | Kunětická Hora |
| 2017 | (United States) Julian Suri | 265 | −23 | 2 strokes | (Finland) Tapio Pulkkanen | Kunětická Hora |
| 2016 | (France) Damien Perrier | 264 | −24 | 1 stroke | (France) Adrien Saddier (England) Jordan Smith | Kunětická Hora |
| 2015 | (Sweden) Jens Fahrbring | 271 | −17 | 1 stroke | (England) Ross McGowan | Kunětická Hora |
| 2014 | (France) Thomas Linard | 269 | −19 | 2 strokes | (Australia) Daniel Gaunt | Kunětická Hora |
D+D Real Czech Challenge Open
| 2013 | (France) François Calmels | 266 | −22 | 3 strokes | (England) Robert Dinwiddie (England) Adam Gee (England) Sam Walker | Kunětická Hora |
| 2012 | (Denmark) Andreas Hartø | 264 | −24 | 3 strokes | (Denmark) Joachim B. Hansen | Kunětická Hora |
