= Erik van Rooyen =

South African professional golfer (born 1990)

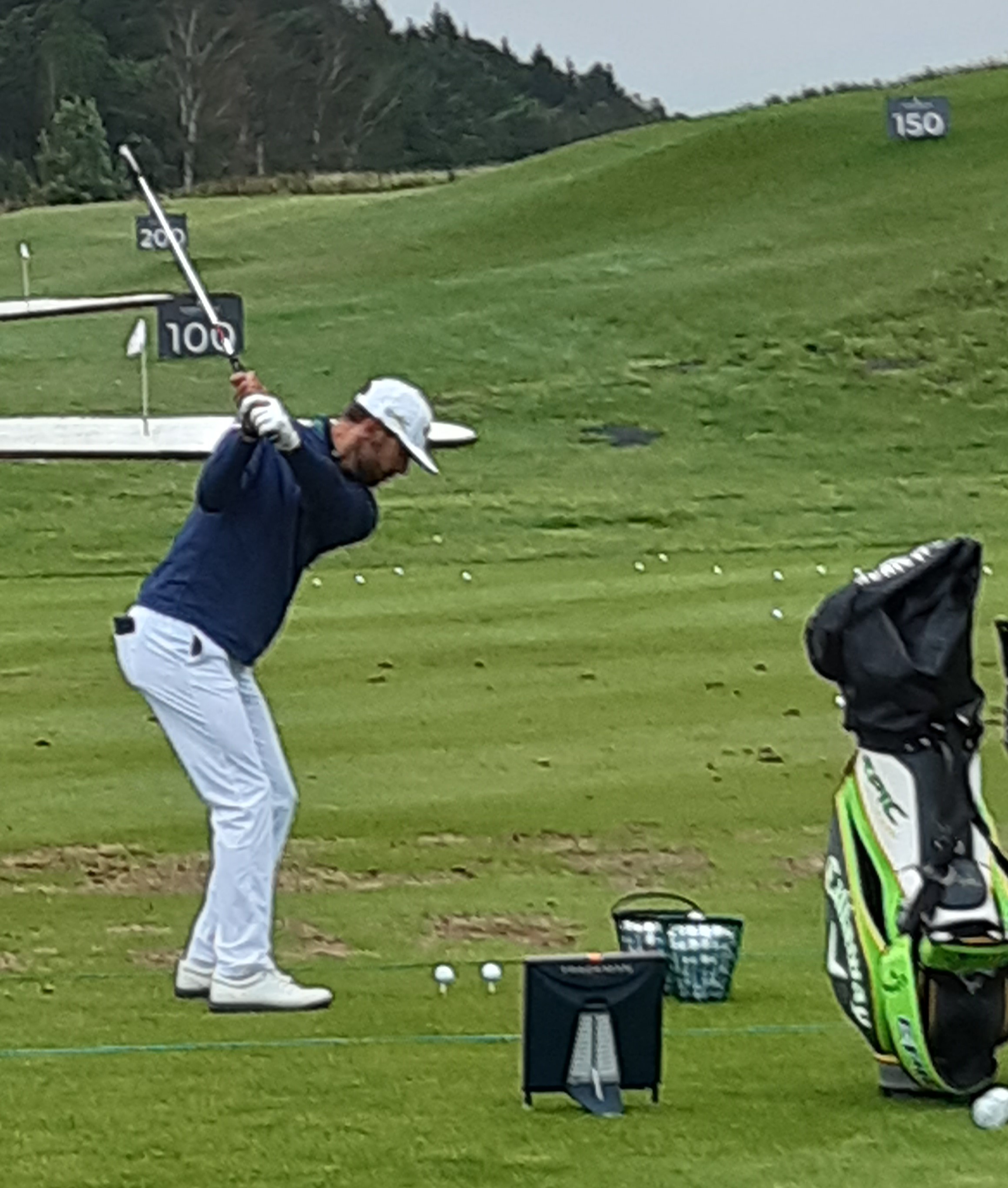

Personal information
- Full name: Frederik Wilhelm van Rooyen
- Nationality: South Africa
- Born: 21 February 1990 (age 36) Bellville, South Africa
- Height: 1.88 m (6 ft 2 in)
- Weight: 86 kg (190 lb)
- Spouse: Rose van Rooyen
- Children: 2

Career
- Sport: Golf
- College: University of Minnesota
- Turned professional: 2013
- Current tours: PGA Tour; Sunshine Tour
- Former tours: European Tour; Challenge Tour
- Professional wins: 6
- Highest ranking: 40 (23 February 2020) (as of 25 October 2026)

Number of wins by tour
- PGA Tour: 2
- European Tour: 1
- Sunshine Tour: 1
- Challenge Tour: 1
- Other: 1

Best results in major championships
- Masters Tournament: T55: 2024
- PGA Championship: T8: 2019
- U.S. Open: T23: 2020
- The Open Championship: T17: 2018

Achievements and awards
- European Tour Graduate of the Year: 2018

Frederik Wilhelm van Rooyen (born 21 February 1990) is a South African professional golfer who currently plays on the European Tour and the PGA Tour. He has won twice on the PGA Tour, as well as once on the European Tour.

== Amateur career ==
Van Rooyen attended the University of Minnesota from 2009 through 2013. During this experience, he won the 2012 Minnesota State Amateur.

== Professional career ==
In 2013, Van Rooyen turned professional. He has played on the Sunshine Tour since turning professional. In early 2017, he had his first win on the tour, the Eye of Africa PGA Championship, making a birdie at the first extra hole in a three-man playoff. He played on the 2017 Challenge Tour where he had his second professional win, the Hainan Open. A number of other good finishes, including fourth place in the Kazakhstan Open and a tie for third in the season-ending NBO Golf Classic Grand Final, put van Rooyen third in the Challenge Tour Race to Oman rankings, earning a card for the 2018 European Tour season.

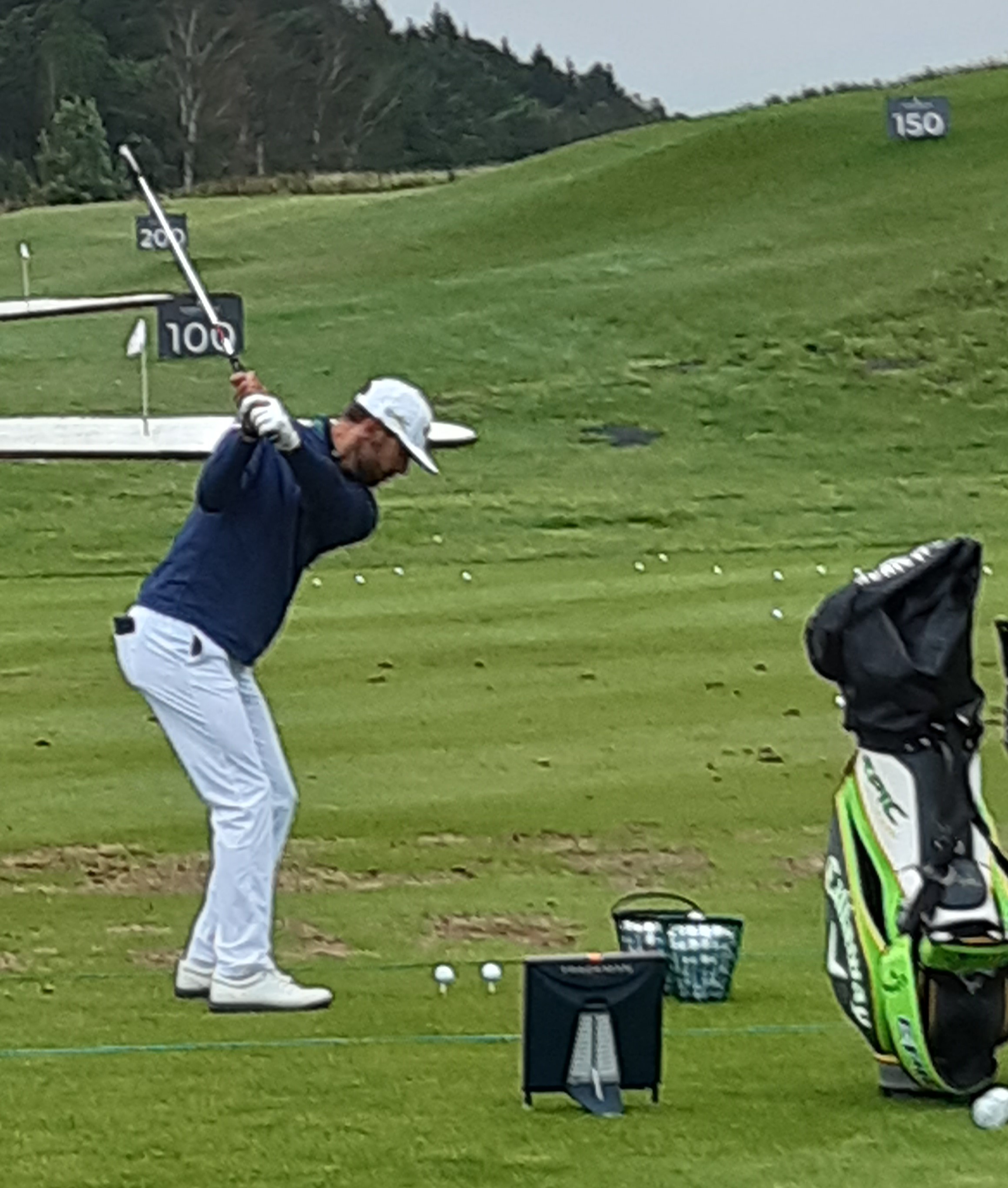
Erik van Rooyen at the 2019 Scandinavian Invitation in Gothenburg, Sweden, at the driving range before the second round

In December 2017, van Rooyen was runner-up in the Joburg Open, three strokes behind Shubhankar Sharma. The event was part of the Open Qualifying Series and his high finish gave him an entry to the 2018 Open Championship, his first major championship. He led the 2018 Dubai Duty Free Irish Open by four strokes after three rounds, but a final round 74 dropped him into a tie for 4th place.

Van Rooyen made a good start to 2019, finishing joint runner-up in the Commercial Bank Qatar Masters and the Hassan II Golf Trophy. He also had a top-10 finish in the 2019 PGA Championship.

On 25 August 2019, van Rooyen won his first European Tour title at the Scandinavian Invitation at Hills Golf & Sports Club, outside Gothenburg, Sweden. He sank a 12 feet birdie putt on the finishing par 5 72nd hole, to win by a stroke with a new tournament record 261 on the par 70 course.

After van Rooyen tied for third at the WGC-Mexico Championship in February 2020, he advanced to a career best 40th on the Official World Golf Ranking.

After a T20 finish at the 2020 WGC-FedEx St. Jude Invitational in August 2020, van Rooyen was granted Special Temporary Membership until the end of the 2019–20 PGA Tour season.

In August 2021, van Rooyen won his first PGA Tour event at the Barracuda Championship. He broke the tournament scoring record by shooting a total of 50 points (modified stableford) over four rounds.

In November 2023, van Rooyen won the 2023 World Wide Technology Championship for his first PGA Tour win in over two years. He made a putt for an eagle on the par-5 18th hole on Sunday to win. In the last round, van Rooyen played the back nine in 8-under 28 as part of a 9-under 63.

== Amateur wins ==
- 2011 Southern Cape Open
- 2012 Minnesota State Amateur

== Professional wins (6) ==
=== PGA Tour wins (2) ===
No.	Date	Tournament	Winning score	Margin of victory	Runner(s)-up
1	8 Aug 2021	Barracuda Championship	50 pts (7-17-10-16=50)	5 points	(United States) Andrew Putnam
2	5 Nov 2023	World Wide Technology Championship	−27 (68-64-66-63=261)	2 strokes	(United States) Matt Kuchar, (Colombia) Camilo Villegas

=== European Tour wins (1) ===
No.	Date	Tournament	Winning score	Margin of victory	Runner-up
1	25 Aug 2019	Scandinavian Invitation	−19 (65-68-64-64=261)	1 stroke	(England) Matt Fitzpatrick

European Tour playoff record (0–1)

No.	Year	Tournament	Opponents	Result
1	2019	Turkish Airlines Open	(England) Tyrrell Hatton, (France) Benjamin Hébert, (United States) Kurt Kitayama, (France) Victor Perez, (Austria) Matthias Schwab	Hatton won with par on fourth extra hole Kitayama eliminated by birdie on third hole Hébert, Perez and van Rooyen eliminated by birdie on first hole

=== Sunshine Tour wins (1) ===
No.	Date	Tournament	Winning score	Margin of victory	Runners-up
1	12 Feb 2017	Eye of Africa PGA Championship	−16 (69-68-68-67=272)	Playoff	(South Africa) Dylan Frittelli, (South Africa) Makhetha Mazibuko

Sunshine Tour playoff record (1–0)

No.	Year	Tournament	Opponents	Result
1	2017	Eye of Africa PGA Championship	(South Africa) Dylan Frittelli, (South Africa) Makhetha Mazibuko	Won with birdie on first extra hole

=== Challenge Tour wins (1) ===
No.	Date	Tournament	Winning score	Margin of victory	Runners-up
1	15 Oct 2017	Hainan Open^{1}	−18 (67-65-67-71=270)	2 strokes	(Scotland) Grant Forrest, (Finland) Tapio Pulkkanen

^{1}Co-sanctioned by the China Tour

=== Other wins (1) ===
No.	Date	Tournament	Winning score	Margin of victory	Runner-up
1	12 Jun 2016	Tapemark Charity Pro-Am	−13 (69-64-67=200)	5 strokes	(United States) Justin Smith

== Results in major championships ==
Results not in chronological order before 2019 and in 2020.

Tournament	2018	2019	2020	2021	2022	2023	2024	2025
Masters Tournament			WD		CUT		T55	
PGA Championship		T8	T51	CUT	CUT		T53	CUT
U.S. Open		T43	T23	CUT	CUT		CUT	CUT
The Open Championship	T17	T20	NT	CUT				

Top 10
Did not play

CUT = missed the half-way cut
WD = withdrew
"T" indicates a tie for a place
NT = no tournament due to COVID-19 pandemic

=== Summary ===
Tournament	Wins	2nd	3rd	Top-5	Top-10	Top-25	Events	Cuts made
Masters Tournament	0	0	0	0	0	0	3	1
PGA Championship	0	0	0	0	1	1	6	3
U.S. Open	0	0	0	0	0	1	6	2
The Open Championship	0	0	0	0	0	2	3	2
Totals	0	0	0	0	1	4	18	8

- Most consecutive cuts made – 6 (2018 Open – 2020 U.S. Open)
- Longest streak of top-10s – 1 (2019 PGA)

== Results in The Players Championship ==
Tournament	2022	2023	2024	2025	2026
The Players Championship	T13		CUT	CUT	CUT

Did not play

CUT = missed the halfway cut
"T" indicates a tie for a place

== Results in World Golf Championships ==
Tournament	2018	2019	2020	2021	2022
Championship		T36	T3	T37	
Match Play			NT^{1}	R16	T60
Invitational			T20		
Champions	T22	T38	NT^{1}	NT^{1}	NT^{1}

^{1}Cancelled due to COVID-19 pandemic

Top 10
Did not play

NT = No tournament
"T" = Tied
QF, R16, R32, R64 = Round in which player lost in match play
Note that the Championship and Invitational were discontinued from 2022.

== Team appearances ==
Professional

- World Cup (representing South Africa): 2018

== See also ==
- 2017 Challenge Tour graduates
