= Maxence Giboudot =

French professional golfer (born 2004)

Personal information
- Nationality: France
- Born: 31 January 2004 (age 22) Voiteur, Lons-le-Saunier, France
- Height: 182 cm (6 ft 0 in)

Career
- Sport: Golf
- College: Texas Christian University
- Turned professional: 2023
- Current tour: European Tour
- Former tour: Challenge Tour

Maxence Giboudot (born 31 January 2004) is a French professional golfer who plays on the European Tour. He was runner-up at the 2024 D+D Real Czech Challenge and the 2026 Danish Golf Challenge.

== Amateur career ==
Giboudot had a successful junior career and won the individual title at the 2020 European Young Masters. He won several national championships, including the 2020 Championnat de France Cadets, and the 2022 Championnat de France Minimes & Cadets. In 2021, he was runner-up at the Championnat de France - Coupe Ganay and Internationaux de France U18 - Trophee Carlhian, also known as the French International Boys Championship, where he lost to Michael Mjaaseth on the 19th hole.

Giboudot attended Texas Christian University during the 2022–23 season and played with the TCU Horned Frogs. His best finish was a tie for 6th at the Big 12 Championship, where he was named to the All-Tournament Team.

== Professional career ==
Giboudot left college early and turned professional in late 2023, at 19, to join the Challenge Tour, after he earned a card at Q-School.

In his rookie season, he was runner-up at the D+D Real Czech Challenge, five strokes behind Benjamin Follett-Smith.

In 2026, he tied for 3rd at the SDC Open in South Africa, and lost a playoff to Tapio Pulkkanen at the Danish Golf Challenge, to finish 15th in the season rankings and graduate to the European Tour for 2027.

== Amateur wins ==
- 2019 Coupe Didier Illouz
- 2020 Grand Prix du Cap d'Agde, Grand Prix des Aisses, European Young Masters (individual), Championnat de France Cadets
- 2022 Championnat de France Minimes & Cadets

== Playoff record ==
Challenge Tour playoff record (0–1)

No.	Year	Tournament	Opponent	Result
1	2026	Danish Golf Challenge	(Finland) Tapio Pulkkanen	Lost to eagle on first extra hole

== Team appearances ==
Amateur

- European Young Masters (representing France): 2020
- European Boys' Team Championship (representing France): 2021, 2022

== See also ==
- 2026 Challenge Tour graduates
