= Marcus Kinhult =

Swedish professional golfer

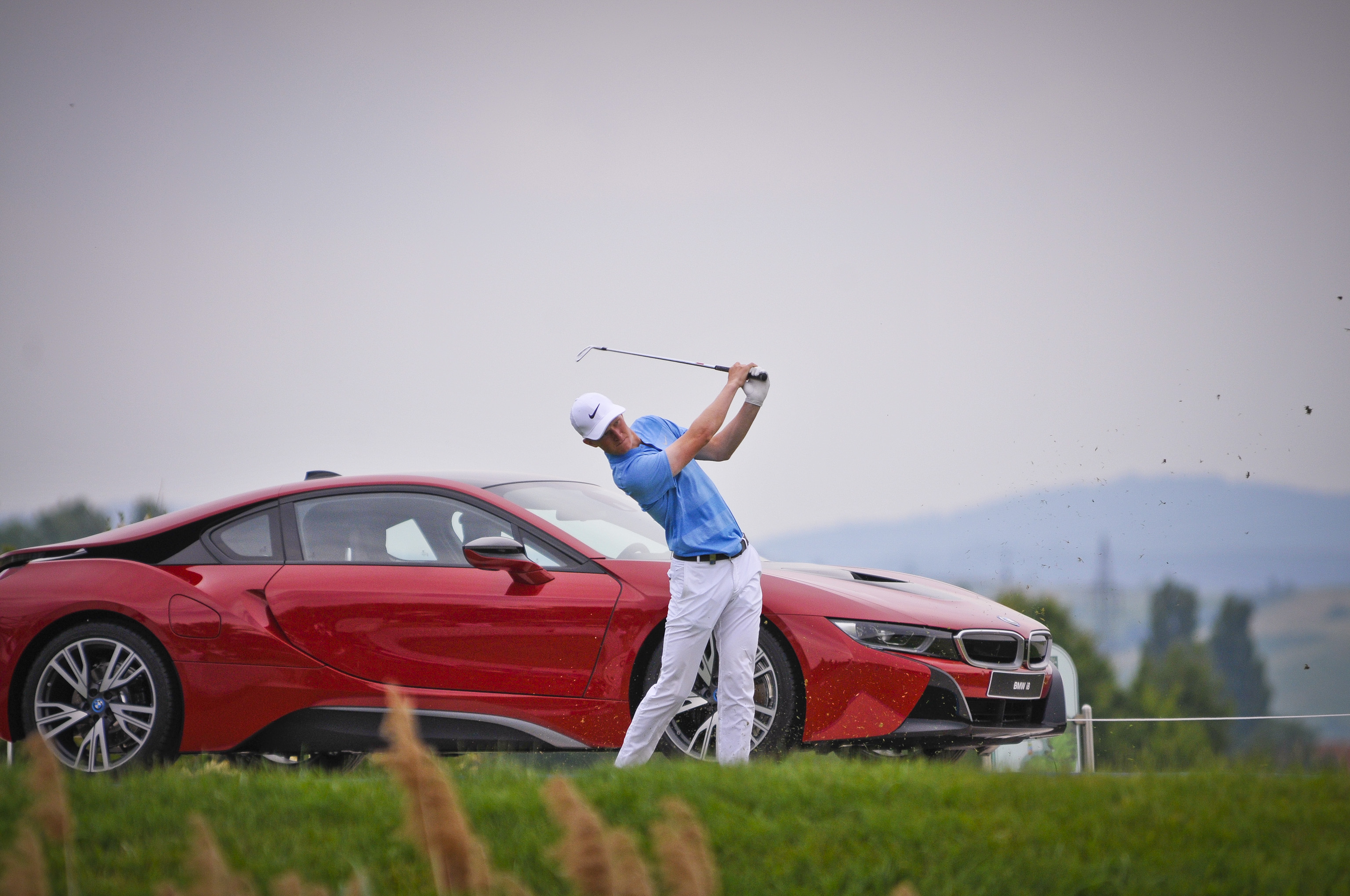
- Kinhult in 2016

Personal information
- Full name: Marcus Mikael Kinhult
- Nationality: Sweden
- Born: 24 July 1996 (age 30) Fiskebäckskil, Sweden
- Height: 1.82 m (6 ft 0 in)
- Weight: 67 kg (148 lb; 10.6 st)

Career
- Sport: Golf
- Turned professional: 2015
- Current tour: European Tour
- Former tour: Challenge Tour
- Professional wins: 3
- Highest ranking: 81 (5 January 2020) (as of 25 October 2026)

Number of wins by tour
- European Tour: 1
- Other: 2

Best results in major championships
- Masters Tournament: DNP
- PGA Championship: CUT: 2020
- U.S. Open: T32: 2019
- The Open Championship: T61: 2018

Achievements and awards
- Swedish Golfer of the Year: 2019
Medal record
Youth Olympic Games
Gold medal – first place	2014 Nanjing	Mixed team
Silver medal – second place	2014 Nanjing	Boys' individual

Marcus Mikael Kinhult (born 24 July 1996) is a Swedish professional golfer who plays on the European Tour. He won the 2019 Betfred British Masters.

== Early life ==
Being son of golf professional Mikael Kinhult, he started playing the game at six years of age at Skaftö Golf Club in Fiskebäckskil, on the small Swedish west coast island Skaftö with 1,400 inhabitants. Other famous members, spending a lot of time there during summer seasons, were future Ryder Cup captain Thomas Bjørn, five-times European Tour winner Barry Lane and Challenge Tour winner to be Joel Sjöholm.

Kinhults younger sister Frida Kinhult also became a tournament golf professional. In June 2019 she reached number one on the World Amateur Golf Ranking, a feat her brother never achieved, as his best world amateur ranking was second.

== Amateur career ==
In 2014 Kinhult represented Sweden at the Summer Youth Olympics and at the Eisenhower Trophy and Europe in the Junior Ryder Cup. At the Summer Youth Olympics in Nanjing, China, he earned an individual silver medal and a gold medal in the mixed team event with Linnea Ström, making Sweden tied best nation at golf in the games.

Kinhult also was part of the Swedish team finishing fourth in the 2014 Eisenhower Trophy in Kuruizawa, Japan, one stroke from the podium. Kinhult was best Swedish player, with the sixth best individual score, five strokes from winner Jon Rahm, Spain, in a field that included several other future professional world stars, like Bryson DeChambeau, Corey Conners and Thomas Detry.

In April 2015, Kinhult won one of the more important junior tournaments in the United States, the Junior Invitational at Sage Valley Golf Club, South Carolina, becoming the first non-American to do so. A month later, he won the prestigious Lytham Trophy at Royal Lytham & St Annes Golf Club, Lancashire, England, by eight shots, following in the footsteps of former winners, such as Michael Bonallack, Peter McEvoy, Paul Broadhurst and Stephen Gallacher.

Kinhult again grabbed the golfing headlines in June 2015 when he led the European Tour's Nordea Masters at Bro Hof Slott Golf Club in Stockholm, Sweden, at the halfway stage, after opening with rounds of 68 and 67. Only 18 years old, he ultimately tied for 33rd place in what was his second European Tour appearance. He was the third amateur to lead a European Tour event after 36 holes, and the first since Ireland's Shane Lowry at the 2009 Irish Open, which Lowry went on to win.

In late 2015 he entered the European Tour Qualifying School as an amateur. After finishing third in the second stage, he led after three rounds at the final stage, eventually settling for the 17th card. Though he had considered going to college in America, he turned professional after his success at PGA Catalunya Resort.

== Professional career ==
2016 was a disappointing first season for Kinhult on the European Tour and he only made two cuts. Halfway through the season he dropped down to the Challenge Tour where his best performance was at the Ras Al Khaimah Golf Challenge, where he held a two-shot lead heading into final round. He eventually finished fourth. Having entered the tournament in 68th place on the Road to Oman he needed a top-three finish to qualify for the Challenge Tour Grand Final.

Kinhult had better success on the Challenge Tour in 2017. He had five top-5 finishes, earned a career best solo second at the NBO Golf Classic Grand Final, and finished 5th in the Road to Oman, which gained him his European Tour card for 2018. He started the 2018 European Tour strongly and after finishing solo third at the Commercial Bank Qatar Masters and tied for fifth at Open de France he rose to 148 on the Official World Golf Ranking and qualified for his first major at the 2018 Open Championship, where he made the cut. Later in the season Kinhult was tied for 4th in the Portugal Masters and he ended the 2018 season 49th in the Order of Merit.

In May 2019, Kinhult secured his maiden professional victory at the Betfred British Masters at Hillside Golf Club, Southport, England. With birdies on the last two holes of the tournament, rolling in an eight-foot birdie putt at the last hole, Kinhult out-dueled his playing partner Matt Wallace by a stroke and won a first prize of €579,550.

In June, at the Walton Heath U.S. Open sectional qualifier in Surrey, England, he qualified for the 2019 U.S. Open at Pebble Beach, where he went on to record the lowest Sunday round of the tournament (66) to finish tied-32 in his first major on American soil.

In November 2019, Kinhult finished second in the Nedbank Golf Challenge in South Africa, after losing in a playoff to Tommy Fleetwood. He finished the 2019 European Tour season 12th on the Order of Merit Race to Dubai rankings and was awarded 2019 Swedish Golfer of the Year, male and female. In January 2020, he reached a career best 81st on the Official World Golf Ranking.

During a practice period in Spain in April 2021, Kinhult suddenly suffered an epileptic seizure, which caused him to take a break of several months from tournament golf. Seven weeks after the incident, Kinhult played nine holes of practice golf at his home course Skaftö GC in Sweden. He came back to competition at the Irish Open on the European Tour in the beginning of July 2021.

In February 2022, Kinhult won the GolfStar Winter Series II on the Nordic Golf League.

In 2024, Kinhult recorded two runner-up finishes. He lost a playoff at the KLM Open in June, and in December he began Sunday two strokes ahead of his closest challenger at the Alfred Dunhill Championship in South Africa, but ultimately finished a stroke back.

In 2026, Kinhult shot a final round bogey-free 64 at the Soudal Open in Belgium to set the clubhouse target at 16 under, to ultimately finish runner-up two strokes behind Richard Sterne.

== Awards and honors ==
- In 2017, he received Elit Sign number 144 by the Swedish Golf Federation based on world ranking and Swedish Golf Ranking achievements.
- He was named as the Swedish Golfer of the Year, male or female, professional or amateur, for the 2019 season.

== Amateur wins ==
- 2010 Strömstaddriven
- 2013 Skandia Junior Open Boys, Swedish Junior Stroke-Play Championship
- 2014 Swedish Junior Stroke-Play Championship, Summer Youth Olympics (with Linnea Ström)
- 2015 Junior Invitational at Sage Valley, Lytham Trophy

== Professional wins (3) ==
=== European Tour wins (1) ===
No.	Date	Tournament	Winning score	Margin of victory	Runners-up
1	12 May 2019	Betfred British Masters	−16 (65-69-68-70=272)	1 stroke	(Scotland) Robert MacIntyre, (England) Eddie Pepperell, (England) Matt Wallace

European Tour playoff record (0–2)

No.	Year	Tournament	Opponent(s)	Result
1	2019	Nedbank Golf Challenge	(England) Tommy Fleetwood	Lost to par on first extra hole
2	2024	KLM Open	(England) Joe Dean, (Italy) Guido Migliozzi	Migliozzi won with birdie on second extra hole

=== Nordic Golf League wins (1) ===
No.	Date	Tournament	Winning score	Margin of victory	Runners-up
1	24 Feb 2022	GolfStar Winter Series II	−10 (69-65-70=204)	1 stroke	(Norway) Jarand Ekeland Arnøy, (Finland) Matias Honkala, (Sweden) Joakim Wikström

=== Other wins (1) ===
- 2011 Torreby Open (Swedish minitour) (as an amateur)

== Results in major championships ==
Results not in chronological order before 2019 and in 2020.

Tournament	2018	2019	2020	2021
Masters Tournament				
PGA Championship			CUT	
U.S. Open		T32		
The Open Championship	T61		NT	CUT

Did not play

CUT = missed the half-way cut
"T" = tied
NT = No tournament due to COVID-19 pandemic

== Results in World Golf Championships ==
Tournament	2020
Championship	T69
Match Play	NT^{1}
Invitational	
Champions	NT^{1}

^{1}Cancelled due to COVID-19 pandemic

Did not play

NT = No tournament
"T" = Tied

== Team appearances ==
Amateur

- European Boys' Team Championship (representing Sweden): 2013, 2014
- Junior World Cup (representing Sweden): 2013
- Jacques Léglise Trophy (representing Continental Europe): 2014
- Summer Youth Olympics mixed team (representing Sweden): 2014 (winners)
- Eisenhower Trophy (representing Sweden): 2014
- Junior Ryder Cup (representing Europe): 2014
- European Amateur Team Championship (representing Sweden): 2015

== See also ==
- 2015 European Tour Qualifying School graduates
- 2017 Challenge Tour graduates
