= Joel Sjöholm =

Swedish professional golfer (born 1985)

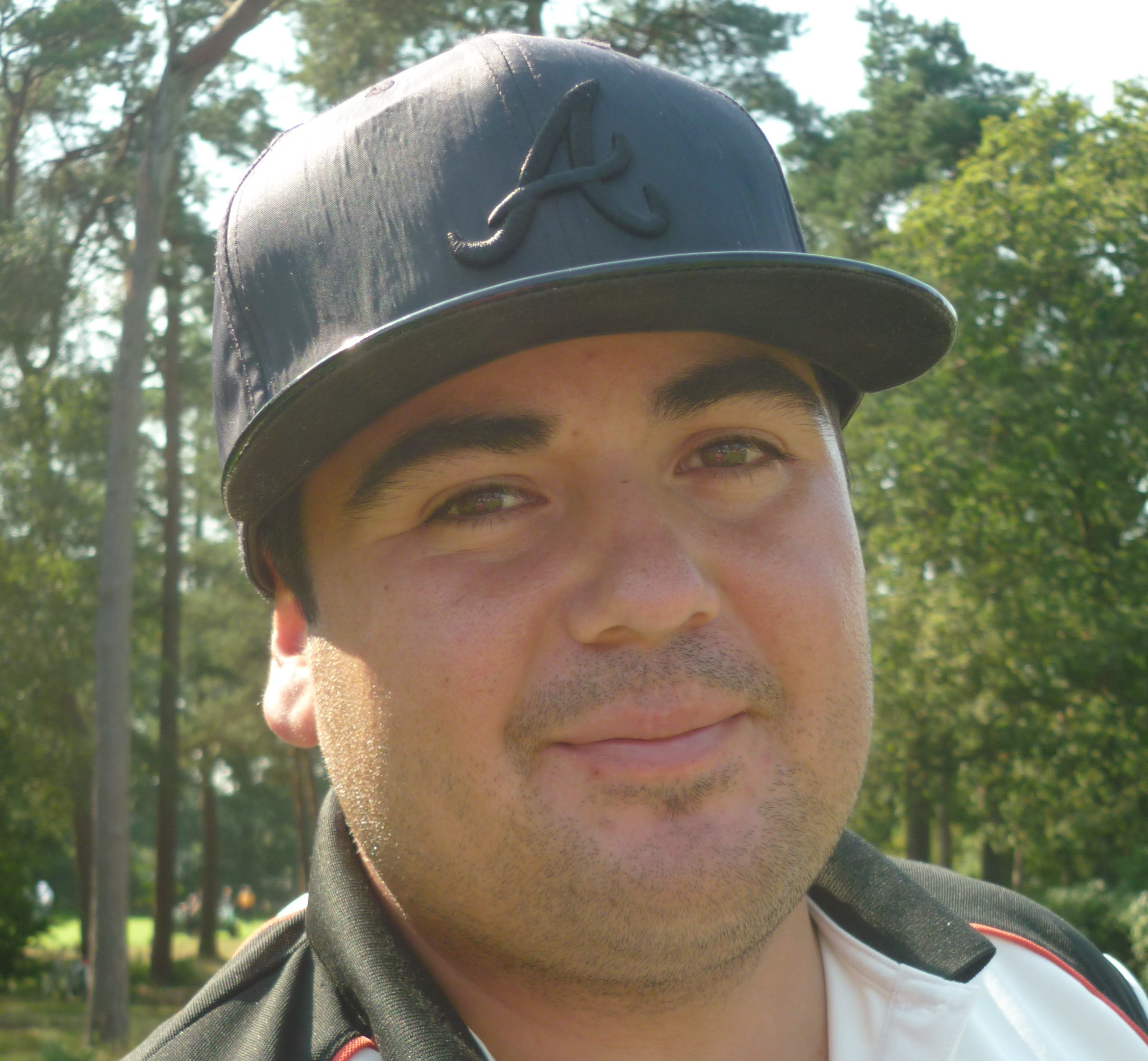

Personal information
- Full name: Joel Nils Patricio Sjöholm
- Nickname: Swedish Toro
- Nationality: Sweden
- Born: 21 February 1985 (age 41) Santiago, Chile
- Height: 1.78 m (5 ft 10 in)
- Weight: 95 kg (209 lb; 15.0 st)
- Spouse: Christina Sjöholm
- Children: 2

Career
- Sport: Golf
- College: Georgia State University
- Turned professional: 2008
- Former tours: European Tour, Challenge Tour
- Professional wins: 2

Number of wins by tour
- Challenge Tour: 2

Joel Nils Patricio Sjöholm (born 21 February 1985) is a Swedish professional golfer who played on the European Tour and the Challenge Tour. He won twice on the Challenge Tour; in 2017 and 2022.

== Early life ==
He was born in Chile and was adopted by a Swedish family when three months old. He started playing the game at young age at Skaftö Golf Club in Fiskebäckskil, on the small Swedish west coast island Skaftö with 1,400 inhabitants. Other famous members, spending a lot of time there, during the summer seasons, were future Ryder Cup captain Thomas Bjørn, five-time European Tour winner Barry Lane and, a few years later, the Kinhult siblings; future European Tour winner Marcus and world amateur number one Frida.

In 2000, Sjöholm won his age level category (15) at the unofficial Swedish Youth Championship, Bankboken Cup, following in the footsteps of former winners of the same category, like Magnus Persson Atlevi, Peter Hedblom and Alexander Norén.

== Amateur career ==
Sjöholm opted to play college golf in the United States, spending four years at Georgia State University, where he was one of the most successful golfers in their history. He won two individual intercollegiate titles, was named a third team all-American in 2007, and ended his college career in 2008 ranked fifth nationally.

He finished second at the 2007 individual European Amateur Championship in Berlin, Germany, losing in a three-hole playoff. He represented Sweden at the European Amateur Team Championship in Scotland the same year, where team Sweden lost in the quarter-finals against, champions to be, Ireland, with Rory McIlroy and Shane Lowry in the team.

== Professional career ==
He turned professional in 2008, and joined the Challenge Tour in Europe, where he played for the following three seasons. He was runner up at the 2008 SWALEC Wales Challenge and the Allianz Golf Open de Lyon and Roma Golf Open in 2010.

In 2010, he had six top-five finishes on the Challenge Tour, the most of any player, and graduated to the European Tour in twelfth place, where he played for the next three seasons. His best performances were a fourth place in the 2012 Alfred Dunhill Links Championship and a tie for third in the 2011 Sicilian Open, which saw him rise to 228th on the Official World Golf Ranking.

In 2017, Sjöholm captured his first professional victory, winning the Italian Challenge Open at Is Molas on Sardinia on the Challenge Tour, with a record aggregate of 24 under par.

During the 2019 Challenge Tour season, he finished tied second at the Challenge de España and second at the Made in Denmark Challenge, finishing the season 23rd on the Challenge Tour Order of Merit Road To Mallorca.

On 1 December 2019 (2020 season), he finished solo second at the Alfred Dunhill Championship at Leopard Creek Country Club, Malelane, South Africa. This event was co-sanctioned by the European Tour and the Sunshine Tour. Sjöholm looked set to win but was beaten only by Pablo Larrazábal, who birdied three of the last four holes to claim the title by one shot.

In July 2020, Sjöholm gained attention for a more comedic moment during the Hero Open, as he used a small boat to take himself towards a small island in the middle of a lake to play his shot where his ball had finished.

In January 2024, Sjöholm announced his retirement as a tournament player. The following month he announced his position as player relation executive on the DP World Tour.

== Personal life ==
Sjöholm is married to Christina and has two children. He resides in Gothenburg and represents Hills Golf and Sports Club.

== Amateur wins ==
- 2007 Rosén Open (Skaftö, Sweden), Club Glove Intercollegiate
- 2008 John Hayt Intercollegiate

== Professional wins (2) ==
=== Challenge Tour wins (2) ===
No.	Date	Tournament	Winning score	Margin of victory	Runners-up
1	16 Jul 2017	Italian Challenge Open	−24 (67-62-66-65=260)	4 strokes	(United States) Chase Koepka, (Scotland) Bradley Neil
2	2 Oct 2022	Hopps Open de Provence	−17 (68-71-65-67=271)	3 strokes	(England) Dan Brown, (South Africa) Deon Germishuys

Challenge Tour playoff record (0–2)

No.	Year	Tournament	Opponent	Result
1	2008	SWALEC Wales Challenge	(Republic of Ireland) Michael McGeady	Lost to par on second extra hole
2	2010	Roma Golf Open	(Denmark) Andreas Hartø	Lost to birdie on first extra hole

== Team appearances ==
Amateur

- European Boys' Team Championship (representing Sweden): 2003
- European Youths' Team Championship (representing Sweden): 2006
- European Amateur Team Championship (representing Sweden): 2007
- Bonallack Trophy (representing Europe): 2008 (winners)

== See also ==
- 2010 Challenge Tour graduates
