= Bill Wright (golfer) =

American professional golfer (1936–2021)

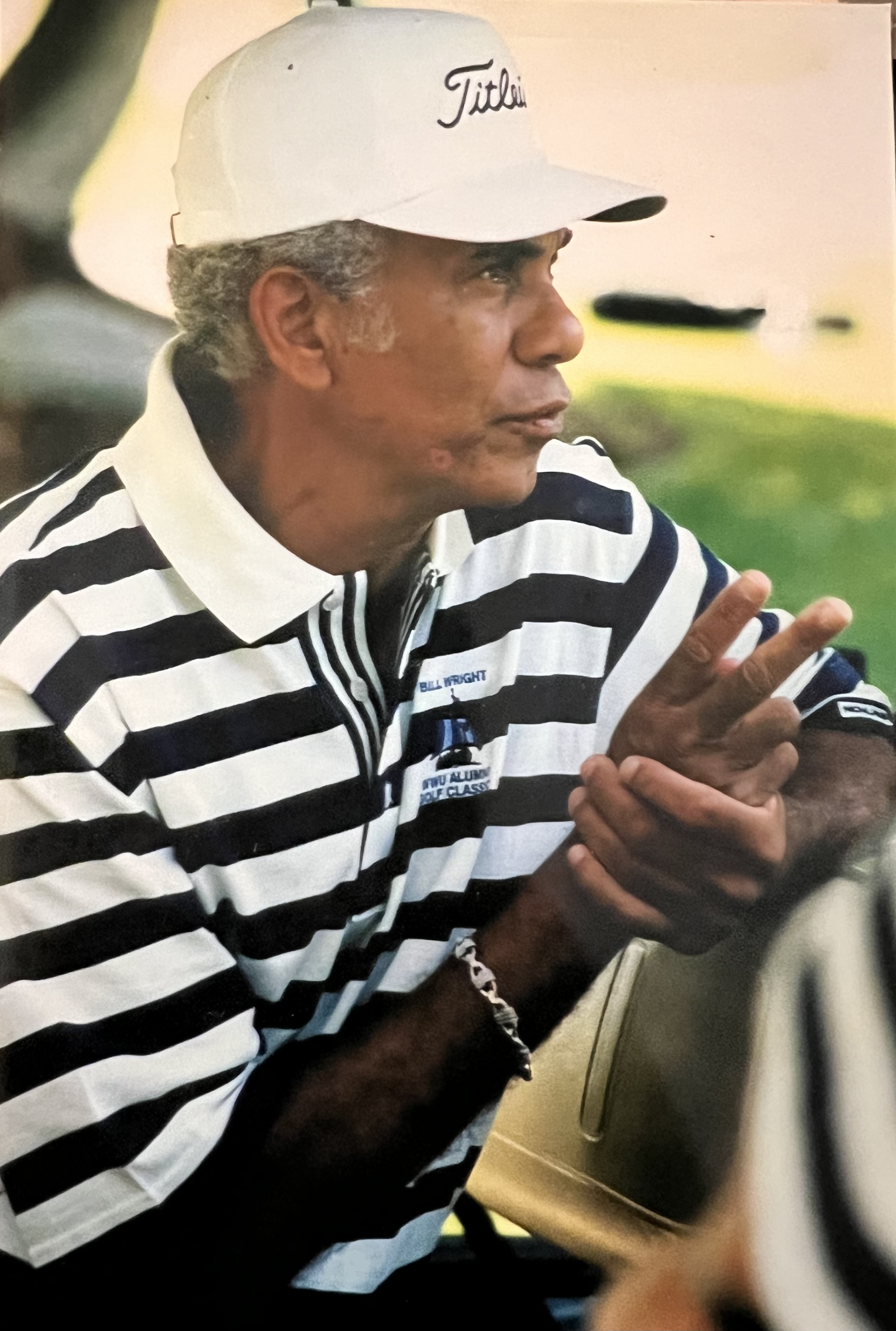

Personal information
- Full name: William A. Wright
- Nationality: United States
- Born: April 4, 1936 Kansas City, Missouri, U.S.
- Died: February 19, 2021 (aged 84) Los Angeles, California, U.S.
- Spouse: Ceta Wright

Career
- Sport: Golf
- College: Western Washington College of Education
- Status: Professional

Best results in major championships
- Masters Tournament: DNP
- PGA Championship: DNP
- U.S. Open: 1966: CUT
- The Open Championship: DNP

William A. Wright (April 4, 1936 – February 19, 2021) was an American golfer. He was the first African-American to win a USGA event, winning the 1959 U.S. Amateur Public Links Championship.

Wright was born in Kansas City, Missouri and later lived in Portland, Oregon, Seattle, Washington, and View Park in Los Angeles, California . He played college golf at Western Washington College of Education, winning the 1960 NAIA Men's Golf Championship individual title.

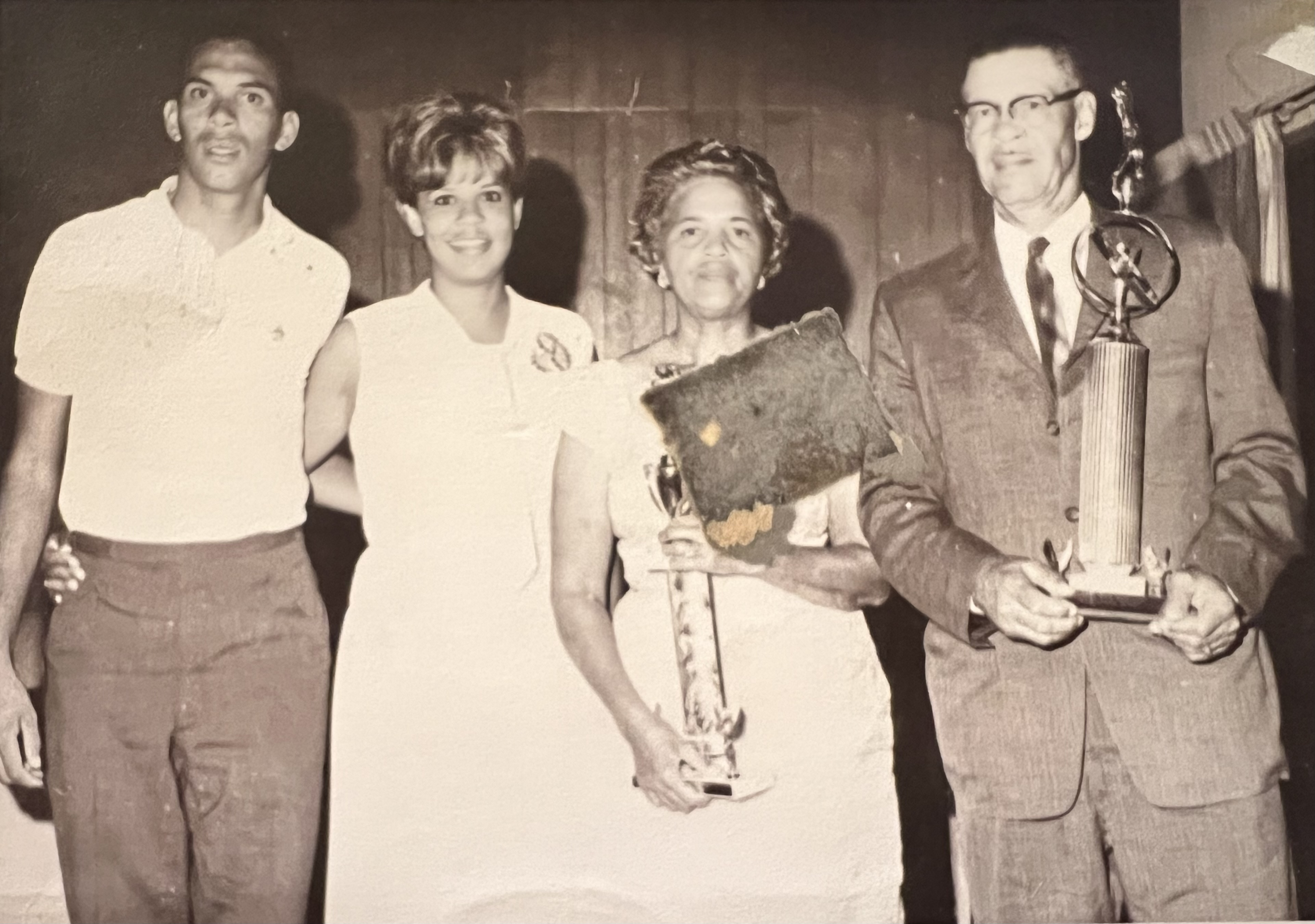
Bill Wright in the early 1960s with wife Ceta, mother Madeline, and father Bob Wright

Wright turned professional in the early 1960s and played a few PGA Tour events. He played in the 1966 U.S. Open and five U.S. Senior Opens.

Wright honed his skills at Seattle's Jefferson Park Golf Course. On October 19, 2024, after a three-year effort by the Beacon Hill Council, First Day Golf Club, and the family of Bill Wright, Seattle Parks and Recreation renamed Jefferson Golf Course as the Bill Wright Golf Complex.

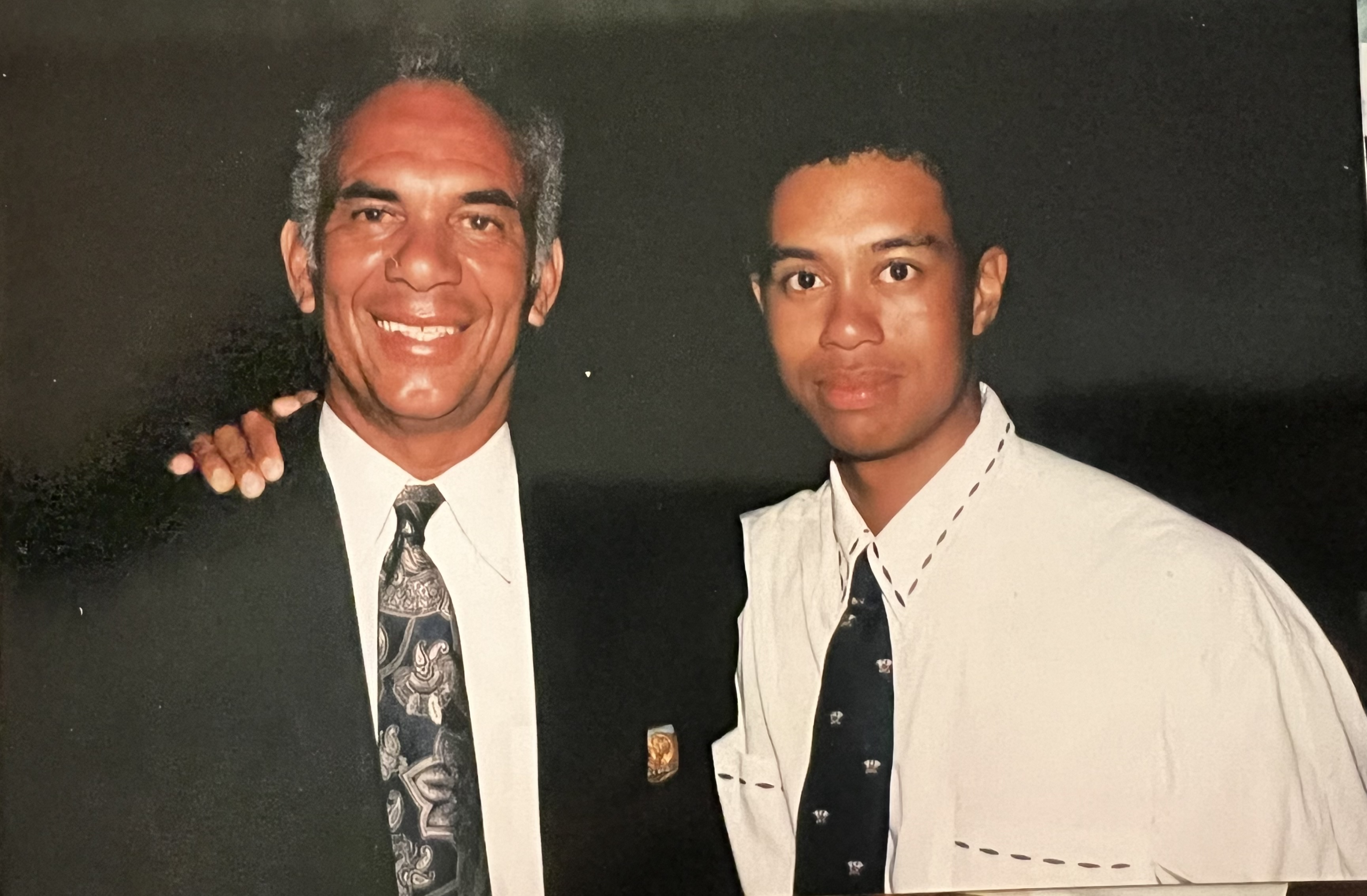
Bill Wright, first African American to win a USGA golf championship, photographed with Tiger Woods
