= Benjamin Follett-Smith =

Zimbabwean professional golfer

Personal information
- Nationality: Zimbabwe
- Born: 9 March 1994 (age 32) Harare, Zimbabwe
- Height: 6 ft 0 in (1.83 m)

Career
- Sport: Golf
- College: Mississippi State University
- Turned professional: 2018
- Current tours: European Tour; Challenge Tour; Sunshine Tour
- Former tours: Asian Tour; Big Easy Tour
- Professional wins: 6

Number of wins by tour
- Sunshine Tour: 3
- Challenge Tour: 2
- Other: 2

Achievements and awards
- Sunshine Tour Rookie of the Year: 2018–19

Benjamin Follett-Smith (born 9 March 1994) is a Zimbabwean professional golfer who plays on the Sunshine Tour and the European Tour. He represented Zimbabwe in the 2018 World Cup of Golf and has won the Cape Town Open twice.

== Early life and amateur career ==
Follett-Smith was born in Harare and educated at St. John's College. He was ranked as Zimbabwe's number one amateur golfer and won the 2012 All-Africa Junior Championship, and represented Zimbabwe in the All-Africa Team Championships.

Follett-Smith attended Mississippi State University from 2013 to 2017, majoring in marketing, as well as playing golf with the Mississippi State Bulldogs men's golf team.

== Professional career ==
Follett-Smith turned professional in 2018 and joined the Sunshine Tour. In September he won Challenge 9 on the Big Easy Tour, its development circuit.

He represented Zimbabwe at the 2018 World Cup of Golf, together with Scott Vincent.

In February 2020, Follett-Smith recorded a one-shot victory at the Final Stage of the Asian Tour Qualifying School. However, with the 2020 and 2021 seasons largely lost to the pandemic, his first full season on the Asian Tour was 2022, where he had limited success.

Follett-Smith won the Cape Town Open at Royal Cape Golf Club in 2019 and again in 2023, when the event was co-sanctioned by the Challenge Tour.

== Amateur wins ==
- 2012 All-Africa Junior Championship
- 2016 Roland Park Open
- 2017 Chattanooga Choo Choo Invitational

== Professional wins (6) ==
=== Sunshine Tour wins (3) ===
No.	Date	Tournament	Winning score	Margin of victory	Runner(s)-up
1	10 Feb 2019	RAM Cape Town Open	−13 (68-69-72-66=275)	2 strokes	(South Africa) Zander Lombard, (South Africa) Jean-Paul Strydom
2	5 Feb 2023	Bain's Whisky Cape Town Open^{1} (2)	−15 (68-68-67-70=273)	1 stroke	(France) Ugo Coussaud, (South Africa) Jaco van Zyl
3	25 Jan 2026	Cell C Challenge	−15 (67-65-67-66=265)	1 stroke	(South Africa) Haydn Porteous

^{1}Co-sanctioned by the Challenge Tour

=== Challenge Tour wins (2) ===
No.	Date	Tournament	Winning score	Margin of victory	Runners-up
1	5 Feb 2023	Bain's Whisky Cape Town Open^{1}	−15 (68-68-67-70=273)	1 stroke	(France) Ugo Coussaud, (South Africa) Jaco van Zyl
2	5 Oct 2024	D+D Real Czech Challenge	−28 (63-62-63-64=252)	5 strokes	(France) Maxence Giboudot, (Finland) Oliver Lindell

^{1}Co-sanctioned by the Sunshine Tour

=== Big Easy Tour wins (1) ===
No.	Date	Tournament	Winning score	Margin of victory	Runners-up
1	5 Sep 2018	Big Easy Challenge 9	−7 (65-76-68=209)	1 stroke	(South Korea) Kim Dong-kwan, (South Africa) Ruan Korb, (South Africa) Cameron Moralee

=== Clutch Pro Tour wins (1) ===
No.	Date	Tournament	Winning score	Margin of victory	Runner-up
1	29 Jun 2020	Notts Holinwell	−6 (66)	1 stroke	(England) Andy Sullivan

== Team appearances ==
Professional

- World Cup (representing Zimbabwe): 2018

== See also ==
- 2024 European Tour Qualifying School graduates
- 2025 European Tour Qualifying School graduates
