= Made in Denmark Challenge =

Danish Golf Challenge
Tournament information
- Location: Odense, Denmark
- Established: 2015
- Course: Odense Eventyr Golf
- Par: 72
- Length: 7,103 yards (6,495 m)
- Tours: Challenge Tour; Nordic Golf League
- Format: Stroke play
- Prize fund: €300,000
- Month played: May

Tournament record score
- Aggregate: 266 Calum Hill (2019)
- To par: −22 as above

Current champion
- (Finland) Tapio Pulkkanen

Final champion
- Location in Denmark

The Made in Denmark Challenge is a golf tournament on the Challenge Tour. It was first played in May 2015 at the Royal Golf Club in Copenhagen, Denmark. It moved to Aalborg Golf Club in 2016, Royal Oak Golf Club in 2017, Himmerland Golf & Spa Resort in 2018 and Silkeborg Ry Golfklub in 2019.

Max Orrin won the inaugural event at Royal Golf Club, Copenhagen, beating Andrew McArthur by a stroke.

== Winners ==
Year	Tour(s) (Note: CHA − Challenge Tour; NGL − Nordic Golf League.)	Winner	Score	To par	Margin of victory	Runner(s)-up	Venue
Danish Golf Challenge
2026	CHA	(Finland) Tapio Pulkkanen	270	−18	Playoff	(France) Maxence Giboudot	Odense Eventyr
2025	CHA	(Denmark) Jonathan Gøth-Rasmussen	269	−19	1 stroke	(Scotland) Calum Fyfe	Bogense
2024	CHA	(Norway) Andreas Halvorsen	269	−19	3 strokes	(Iceland) Guðmundur Kristjánsson (Finland) Oliver Lindell (England) John Parry	Odense Eventyr
Copenhagen Challenge
2023	CHA	(Italy) Matteo Manassero	276	−12	1 stroke	(South Africa) Casey Jarvis	Royal GC
Frederikshavn Challenge
2022	CHA	(Germany) Freddy Schott	271	−17	3 strokes	(Germany) Nick Bachem (Sweden) Simon Forsström	Frederikshavn
Made in Esbjerg Challenge
2021	CHA, NGL	(Portugal) Ricardo Gouveia	276	−8	3 strokes	(United States) Dodge Kemmer (Sweden) Jesper Kennegård (Austria) Niklas Regner	Esbjerg
Made in Denmark Challenge
2020	CHA	Cancelled due to the COVID-19 pandemic					
2019	CHA	(Scotland) Calum Hill	266	−22	1 stroke	(Sweden) Joel Sjöholm	Silkeborg Ry
2018	CHA	(Denmark) Joachim B. Hansen	269	−15	5 strokes	(Finland) Kalle Samooja	HimmerLand
2017	CHA	(Sweden) Oscar Stark	274	−14	2 strokes	(Germany) Dominic Foos (France) Victor Perez (France) Adrien Saddier	Royal Oak
2016	CHA	(Germany) Bernd Ritthammer	272	−12	1 stroke	(Netherlands) Jurrian van der Vaart	Aalborg
2015	CHA	(England) Max Orrin	285	+1	1 stroke	(Scotland) Andrew McArthur	Royal GC
