= Bahrain Championship (golf) =

Coordinates: 26.092°N 50.566°E

Barco Energies Bahrain Championship
Tournament information
- Location: Bahrain
- Established: 2024
- Course: Royal Golf Club
- Par: 72
- Length: 7,302 yards (6,677 m)
- Tour: European Tour
- Format: Stroke play
- Prize fund: US$2,750,000
- Month played: January/February

Tournament record score
- Aggregate: 271 Calum Hill (2026); 271 Patrick Reed (2026); 271 Freddy Schott (2026)
- To par: −17 as above

Current champion
- (Germany) Freddy Schott

Location map
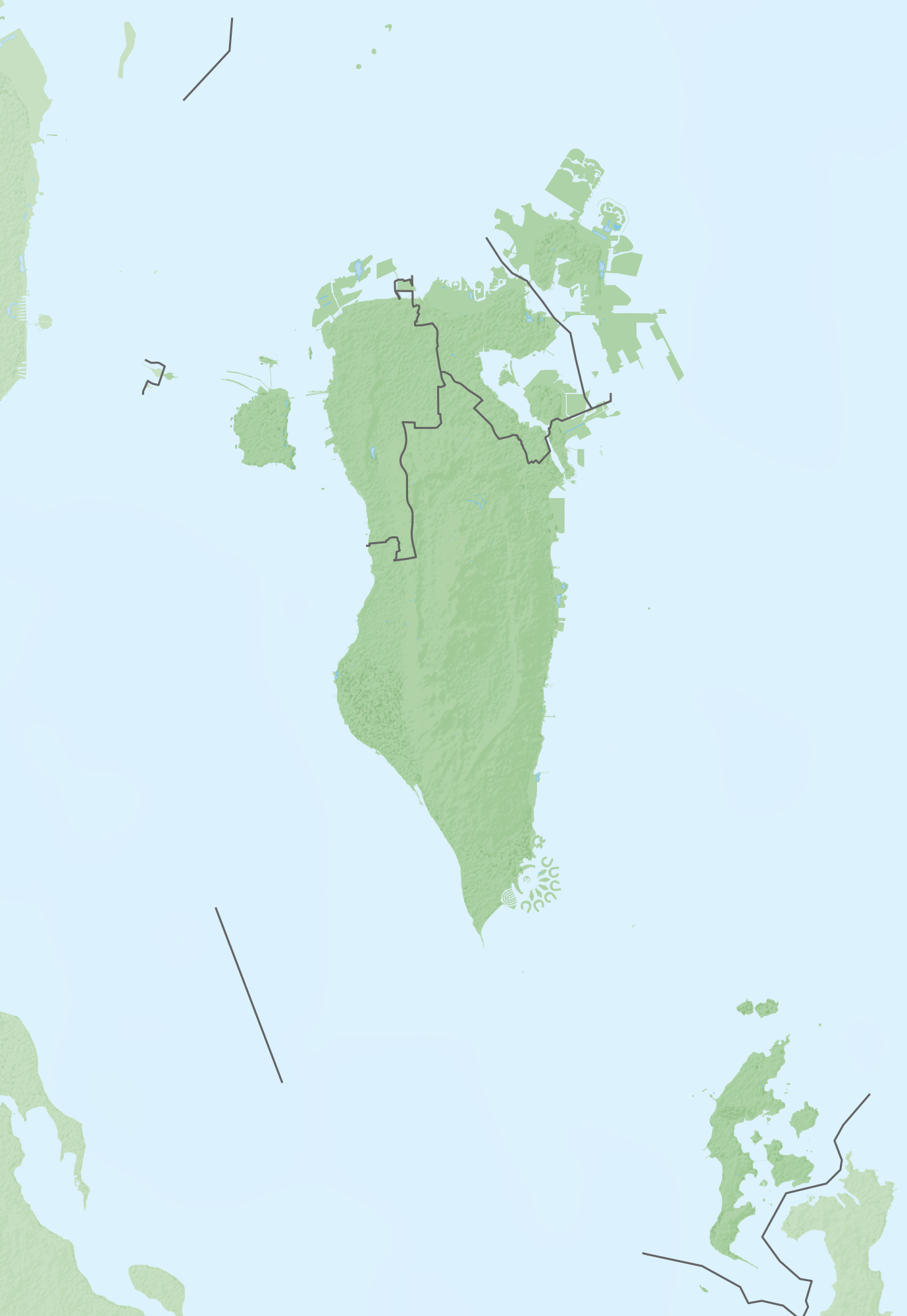
- Location in Bahrain

The Bahrain Championship is a professional golf tournament which is played on the European Tour.

The tournament was revealed as part of the 2024 European Tour schedule announcement in August 2023. In January 2024, Bapco Energies was announced as the presenting title sponsor for the inaugural event.

Dylan Frittelli won the inaugural event, winning by two shots ahead of Zander Lombard and Jesper Svensson.

== Winners ==
Year	Winner	Score	To par	Margin of victory	Runners-up
Bapco Energies Bahrain Championship
2026	(Germany) Freddy Schott	271	−17	Playoff	(Scotland) Calum Hill (United States) Patrick Reed
2025	(England) Laurie Canter	274	−14	Playoff (Note: Canter won with a birdie on the first hole of a sudden-death playoff.)	(England) Dan Brown (Spain) Pablo Larrazábal
Bahrain Championship
2024	(South Africa) Dylan Frittelli	275	−13	2 strokes	(South Africa) Zander Lombard (Sweden) Jesper Svensson
