= Chase Koepka =

American professional golfer (born 1994)

Personal information
- Nationality: United States
- Born: January 30, 1994 (age 32) West Palm Beach, Florida, U.S.
- Height: 5 ft 9 in (1.75 m)
- Weight: 154 lb (70 kg; 11.0 st)

Career
- Sport: Golf
- College: University of South Florida
- Turned professional: 2016
- Current tour: Asian Tour
- Former tours: European Tour; Challenge Tour; Korn Ferry Tour; LIV Golf

Chase Koepka (born January 30, 1994) is an American professional golfer who plays on the Asian Tour. He is the younger brother of Brooks Koepka, who is also a professional golfer. His great uncle is former Major League Baseball player Dick Groat.

== Career ==
Koepka attended the University of South Florida from 2012 to 2016, winning four tournaments in his college career.

Koepka turned professional in the middle of 2016 and played on the Challenge Tour in the latter part of the year with little success. He played on the tour again in 2017 and had much more success. He finished in the top-10 on five occasions, including being runner-up in the Italian Challenge and the Kazakhstan Open, and finished the season 9th in the Order of Merit to earn a place on the European Tour for 2018. He teamed with his brother Brooks in the 2017 Zurich Classic of New Orleans, the pair finishing tied for 5th.

Koepka started 2018 well, finishing tied for 7th place in the BMW SA Open but thereafter failed to finish in the top 20 of any European Tour event and finished 182nd in the Order of Merit. In 2019, Koepka played on the Challenge Tour but only made the cut three times in 12 events. He also made an attempt to qualify for the Korn Ferry Tour in both 2020 and 2021.

In 2022, Koepka joined LIV Golf, which he would go on to be relegated from after the 2023 season.

== Amateur wins ==
- 2013 Rees Jones Invitational, AutoTrader.com Collegiate
- 2014 Invitational at the Ocean Course
- 2016 Mission Inn Spring Spectacular

== Playoff record ==
Challenge Tour playoff record (0–1)

No.	Year	Tournament	Opponent	Result
1	2017	Kazakhstan Open	(Finland) Tapio Pulkkanen	Lost to par on third extra hole

== See also ==
- 2017 Challenge Tour graduates
