= 2026 Challenge Tour graduates =

This is a list of players who graduated from the Challenge Tour in 2026. The top 15 players on the Challenge Tour points list graduated to the European Tour for the 2027 season with category 15 exemption, the next 5 with category 19.

		2026 Challenge Tour		2027 European Tour				
	Player	Points rank	Points	Starts	Cuts made	Best finish	Money list rank	Earnings (€)
(Denmark)	Hamish Brown	1	1,702					
(France)	Julien Sale*	2	1,623					
(Netherlands)	Lars van der Vight*	3	1,309					
(Sweden)	Christofer Blomstrand	4	1,276					
(South Africa)	M. J. Daffue^{†}	5	1,272					
(Spain)	Pablo Ereño*	6	1,129					
(Finland)	Tapio Pulkkanen	7	1,066					
(Sweden)	Adam Wallin*	8	882					
(Republic of Ireland)	Liam Nolan*	9	870					
(England)	John Gough*	10	865					
(Denmark)	Sebastian Friedrichsen	11	849					
(England)	Will Enefer	12	816					
(Scotland)	Marc Warren	13	771					
(England)	Andrew Wilson	14	762					
(France)	Maxence Giboudot*	15	758					

*European Tour rookie in 2027
^{†}First-time full member, but ineligible for Rookie of the Year award
