= John Deere Classic =

Annual golf tournament in Silvis, Illinois, US

Tournament information
- Location: Silvis, Illinois
- Established: 1971
- Course: TPC Deere Run
- Par: 71
- Length: 7,257 yards (6,636 m)
- Tour: PGA Tour
- Format: Stroke play
- Prize fund: US$8,800,000
- Month played: July
- Website: johndeereclassic.com

Tournament record score
- Aggregate: 256 Davis Thompson (2024)
- To par: −28 as above

Current champion
- (United States) Chris Gotterup

Location map
- Location in the United States Location in Illinois

The John Deere Classic is a professional golf tournament on the PGA Tour. It is played annually in July, usually the week before The Open Championship, at TPC Deere Run in the Quad Cities community of Silvis, Illinois.

== History ==
The tournament began as the Quad Cities Open in 1971 as a "satellite event" on the PGA Tour, and became an official tour event in 1972, played in early autumn. It moved to mid-July in 1974, and Ed McMahon served as tournament host from 1975 to 1979. Title sponsors have included Miller Brewing Company (1982–85), Hardee's (1986–94), and John Deere (since 1999).

From the event's inception in 1971 through 1974, it was played at Crow Valley Country Club in Davenport, Iowa. It then moved to Oakwood Country Club in Coal Valley, Illinois from 1975 to 1999. Beginning in 2000, the event has been at the TPC at Deere Run in Silvis.

In 2005 and 2006, the tournament generated more media coverage because of the sponsor's exemptions given to teenager Michelle Wie. The 2013 edition saw Jordan Spieth, two weeks shy of his 20th birthday, become the first teenager to win on the PGA Tour since 1931.

Since the introduction of the Open Qualifying Series, the John Deere Classic is a final chance for a player not already exempt to earn entry into The Open if he finished in the top five. In order to help attract players who will compete in the following week's Open Championship, since 2008 the John Deere Classic has sponsored a charter flight that leaves the Quad Cities on Sunday night and arrives in Britain the next morning.

== Highlights ==
- 1971: Future PGA Tour commissioner Deane Beman wins the inaugural tournament by two strokes over Dow Finsterwald.
- 1972: Deane Beman successfully defends his championship in the tournament's first year as an official event.
- 1979: Sam Snead becomes the first golfer in PGA Tour history to shoot his age in the second round with a 67. He then shot a 66 in the final round.
- 2000: Michael Clark II wins the first John Deere Classic played at TPC Deere Run.
- 2005: Michelle Wie, then a teenager, plays for the first time on a sponsor's exemption.
- 2011: Steve Stricker becomes the first to win the John Deere Classic in three consecutive years.
- 2013: 19-year-old Jordan Spieth becomes the youngest to win a PGA Tour event; he won the JDC again two years later.

== Winners ==
Year	Winner	Score	To par	Margin of victory	Runner(s)-up	Purse (US$)	Winner's share ($)
John Deere Classic
2026	(United States) Chris Gotterup	264	−20	1 stroke	(United States) Max Homa	8,800,000	1,584,000
2025	(United States) Brian Campbell	266	−18	Playoff	(Argentina) Emiliano Grillo	8,400,000	1,512,000
2024	(United States) Davis Thompson	256	−28	4 strokes	(United States) Luke Clanton (a) (Taiwan) Pan Cheng-tsung (United States) Michael Thorbjornsen	8,000,000	1,440,000
2023	(Austria) Sepp Straka	263	−21	2 strokes	(United States) Alex Smalley (United States) Brendon Todd	7,400,000	1,332,000
2022	(United States) J. T. Poston	263	−21	3 strokes	(South Africa) Christiaan Bezuidenhout (Argentina) Emiliano Grillo	7,100,000	1,278,000
2021	(United States) Lucas Glover	265	−19	2 strokes	(United States) Ryan Moore (United States) Kevin Na	6,200,000	1,116,000
2020	Canceled due to the COVID-19 pandemic						
2019	(South Africa) Dylan Frittelli	263	−21	2 strokes	(United States) Russell Henley	6,000,000	1,080,000
2018	(United States) Michael Kim	257	−27	8 strokes	(United States) Bronson Burgoon (United States) Joel Dahmen (Italy) Francesco Molinari (United States) Sam Ryder	5,800,000	1,044,000
2017	(United States) Bryson DeChambeau	266	−18	1 stroke	(United States) Patrick Rodgers	5,600,000	1,008,000
2016	(United States) Ryan Moore	262	−22	2 strokes	(United States) Ben Martin	4,800,000	864,000
2015	(United States) Jordan Spieth (2)	264	−20	Playoff	(United States) Tom Gillis	4,700,000	846,000
2014	(United States) Brian Harman	262	−22	1 stroke	(United States) Zach Johnson	4,700,000	846,000
2013	(United States) Jordan Spieth	265	−19	Playoff	(Canada) David Hearn (United States) Zach Johnson	4,600,000	828,000
2012	(United States) Zach Johnson	264	−20	Playoff	(United States) Troy Matteson	4,600,000	828,000
2011	(United States) Steve Stricker (3)	262	−22	1 stroke	(United States) Kyle Stanley	4,500,000	810,000
2010	(United States) Steve Stricker (2)	258	−26	2 strokes	(United States) Paul Goydos	4,400,000	792,000
2009	(United States) Steve Stricker	264	−20	3 strokes	(United States) Zach Johnson (United States) Brett Quigley (United States) Brandt Snedeker	4,300,000	774,000
2008	(United States) Kenny Perry	268	−16	Playoff	(United States) Brad Adamonis (United States) Jay Williamson	4,200,000	756,000
2007	(United States) Jonathan Byrd	266	−18	1 stroke	(South Africa) Tim Clark	4,100,000	738,000
2006	(Australia) John Senden	265	−19	1 stroke	(United States) J. P. Hayes	4,000,000	720,000
2005	(United States) Sean O'Hair	268	−16	1 stroke	(United States) Robert Damron (United States) Hank Kuehne	4,000,000	720,000
2004	(Australia) Mark Hensby	268	−16	Playoff	(England) John E. Morgan	3,800,000	684,000
2003	(Fiji) Vijay Singh	268	−16	4 strokes	(United States) Jonathan Byrd (United States) J. L. Lewis (United States) Chris Riley	3,500,000	630,000
2002	(United States) J. P. Hayes	262	−22	4 strokes	(United States) Robert Gamez	3,000,000	540,000
2001	(United States) David Gossett	265	−19	1 stroke	(United States) Briny Baird	2,800,000	504,000
2000	(United States) Michael Clark II	265	−19	Playoff	(United States) Kirk Triplett	2,600,000	468,000
1999	(United States) J. L. Lewis	261	−19	Playoff	(United States) Mike Brisky	2,000,000	360,000
Quad City Classic
1998	(United States) Steve Jones	263	−17	1 stroke	(United States) Scott Gump	1,550,000	279,000
1997	(United States) David Toms	265	−15	3 strokes	(United States) Brandel Chamblee (United States) Robert Gamez (United States) Jimmy Johnston	1,350,000	243,000
1996	(United States) Ed Fiori	268	−12	2 strokes	(United States) Andrew Magee	1,200,000	216,000
1995	(United States) D. A. Weibring (3)	197 (Note: Shortened to 54 holes due to rain.)	−13	1 stroke	(United States) Jonathan Kaye	1,000,000	180,000
Hardee's Golf Classic
1994	(United States) Mark McCumber	265	−15	1 stroke	(United States) Kenny Perry	1,000,000	180,000
1993	(South Africa) David Frost (2)	259	−21	7 strokes	(United States) Payne Stewart (United States) D. A. Weibring	1,000,000	180,000
1992	(South Africa) David Frost	266	−14	3 strokes	(United States) Tom Lehman (United States) Loren Roberts	1,000,000	180,000
1991	(United States) D. A. Weibring (2)	267	−13	1 stroke	(United States) Paul Azinger (United States) Peter Jacobsen	1,000,000	180,000
1990	(United States) Joey Sindelar	268	−12	Playoff	(United States) Willie Wood	1,000,000	180,000
1989	(United States) Curt Byrum	268	−12	1 stroke	(United States) Bill Britton (United States) Brian Tennyson	700,000	126,000
1988	(United States) Blaine McCallister	261	−19	3 strokes	(United States) Dan Forsman	600,000	108,000
1987	(United States) Kenny Knox	265	−15	1 stroke	(United States) Gil Morgan	500,000	90,000
1986	(United States) Mark Wiebe	268	−12	1 stroke	(United States) Curt Byrum	400,000	72,000
Lite Quad Cities Open
1985	(United States) Dan Forsman	267	−13	1 stroke	(United States) Bob Tway	300,000	54,000
Miller High Life QCO
1984	(United States) Scott Hoch (2)	266	−14	5 strokes	(United States) George Archer (United States) Vance Heafner (United States) Dave Stockton	200,000	36,000
1983	(United States) Danny Edwards	266	−14	Playoff	(United States) Morris Hatalsky	200,000	36,000
1982	(United States) Payne Stewart	268	−12	2 strokes	(United States) Brad Bryant (United States) Pat McGowan	200,000	36,000
Quad Cities Open
1981	(Canada) Dave Barr	270	−10	Playoff	(United States) Woody Blackburn (United States) Frank Conner (Canada) Dan Halldorson (Mexico) Victor Regalado	200,000	36,000
1980	(United States) Scott Hoch	266	−14	3 strokes	(United States) Curtis Strange	200,000	36,000
Ed McMahon-Jaycees Quad Cities Open
1979	(United States) D. A. Weibring	266	−14	2 strokes	(United States) Calvin Peete	200,000	36,000
1978	(Mexico) Victor Regalado	269	−15	1 stroke	(United States) Fred Marti	150,000	30,000
1977	(United States) Mike Morley	267	−17	1 stroke	(United States) Bob Murphy (Mexico) Victor Regalado	125,000	25,000
1976	(New Zealand) John Lister	268	−16	2 strokes	(United States) Fuzzy Zoeller	100,000	20,000
1975	(United States) Roger Maltbie	275	−9	1 stroke	(United States) Dave Eichelberger	75,000	15,000
Quad Cities Open
1974	(United States) Dave Stockton	271	−13	1 stroke	(United States) Bruce Fleisher	100,000	20,000
1973	(United States) Sam Adams	268	−16	3 strokes	(United States) Dwight Nevil (United States) Kermit Zarley	100,000	20,000
1972	(United States) Deane Beman (2)	279	−5	1 stroke	(United States) Tom Watson	100,000	20,000
Quad Cities Open Invitational
1971	(United States) Deane Beman	277	−7	2 strokes	(United States) Dow Finsterwald	25,000	5,000

Note: Green highlight indicates scoring records.

== Multiple winners ==
Through 2023, six men have won the John Deere Classic more than once.

- 3 wins
  - D. A. Weibring: 1979, 1991, 1995
  - Steve Stricker: 2009, 2010, 2011
- 2 wins
  - Deane Beman: 1971, 1972
  - Scott Hoch: 1980, 1984
  - David Frost: 1992, 1993
  - Jordan Spieth: 2013, 2015
