= Freddy Schott =

German professional golfer (born 2001)

Personal information
- Full name: Frederik Schott
- Nationality: Germany
- Born: 27 May 2001 (age 25) Düsseldorf, Germany

Career
- Sport: Golf
- Turned professional: 2021
- Current tour: European Tour
- Former tours: Sunshine Tour; Challenge Tour; Pro Golf Tour
- Professional wins: 3

Number of wins by tour
- European Tour: 1
- Challenge Tour: 1
- Other: 1

Frederik Schott (born 27 May 2001) is a German professional golfer and European Tour player.

== Early life and amateur career ==
Schott was born in Düsseldorf and became a scratch golfer when he was just 13 years old. His mentor is Marcel Siem, whom he caddied for on the European Tour in 2020 to gain experience on tour.

Schott won several amateur events in North Rhine-Westphalia, and in 2019 he was runner-up at the German National Boys Championship, and the South African Juniors International.

He won silver for Germany at the 2019 European Boys' Team Championship at Golf de Chantilly in France, where he won his game with Tiger Christensen, 2 and 1, as Germany lost the final to France 5–2.

== Professional career ==
Schott turned professional in 2021 and joined the Sunshine Tour, where his best finish was a tie for 7th at the Cape Town Open, before transitioning to the Challenge Tour. He also made a start on the third-tier Pro Golf Tour in the Netherlands, where he won the FaberExposize Gelpenberg Open wire-to-wire, his first professional title.

In 2022, Schott won the Frederikshavn Challenge in Denmark and recorded another six top-5 finishes to finish 9th in the rankings, and graduate to the European Tour for 2023.

In 2023, his rookie European Tour season, Schott recorded a season best tie for 10th at the Made in HimmerLand and finished 144th in the rankings. He topped the 2023 European Tour Qualifying School to keep full playing privileges. In 2024 he finished 117th in the rankings, and in 2025 102nd.

In February 2026, Schott won the Bapco Energies Bahrain Championship in a playoff against Calum Hill and Patrick Reed for his first DP World Tour victory.

== Amateur wins ==
- 2018 GVNRW-Ranglistenturnier #1
- 2020 GTGA Invitational

== Professional wins (3) ==
=== European Tour wins (1) ===
No.	Date	Tournament	Winning score	Margin of victory	Runners-up
1	1 Feb 2026	Bapco Energies Bahrain Championship	−17 (65-67-70-69=271)	Playoff	(Scotland) Calum Hill, (United States) Patrick Reed

European Tour playoff record (1–0)

No.	Year	Tournament	Opponents	Result
1	2026	Bapco Energies Bahrain Championship	(Scotland) Calum Hill, (United States) Patrick Reed	Won with par on second extra hole Reed eliminated by par on first hole

=== Challenge Tour wins (1) ===
No.	Date	Tournament	Winning score	Margin of victory	Runners-up
1	14 Aug 2022	Frederikshavn Challenge	−17 (65-67-66-73=271)	3 strokes	(Germany) Nick Bachem, (Sweden) Simon Forsström

=== Pro Golf Tour wins (1) ===
No.	Date	Tournament	Winning score	Margin of victory	Runner-up
1	5 Sep 2021	FaberExposize Gelpenberg Open	−13 (65-69-69=203)	1 stroke	(Portugal) Tomás Gouveia

== Team appearances ==
- European Boys' Team Championship (representing Germany): 2019

== See also ==
- 2022 Challenge Tour graduates
- 2023 European Tour Qualifying School graduates
