= Silvis, Illinois =

- City
- Silvis, Illinois welcome sign

- Flag Logo
- Motto: A City of Progress
- Location of Silvis in Rock Island County, Illinois.

- Location of Illinois in the United States
- Coordinates: 41°29′52″N 90°24′37″W
- Country: United States
- State: Illinois
- County: Rock Island
- Founded: 1906

Area
  - Total: 4.29 sq mi (11.10 km^{2})
  - Land: 4.29 sq mi (11.10 km^{2})
  - Water: 0 sq mi (0.00 km^{2})
- Elevation: 689 ft (210 m)

Population (2020)
  - Total: 8,003
  - Density: 1,870/sq mi (721/km^{2})
- Time zone: UTC-6 (CST)
  - Summer (DST): UTC-5 (CDT)
- ZIP code: 61282
- Area code: 309
- FIPS code: 17-69979
- GNIS feature ID: 2395890
- Website: www.silvisil.org

Silvis is a city in Rock Island County, Illinois, United States. It is part of a larger metropolitan area known as the Quad Cities. The Quad Cities Metropolitan Area is situated across four counties in Illinois and Iowa. It is located four miles (6.4 km) from the interchange of I-80 and I-88, 165 miles (266 km) west of Chicago, and 165 miles (266 km) east of Des Moines. It sits next to East Moline and Moline.

As of the 2020 census, Silvis had a population of 8,003.

Silvis is near two major medical centers, including a critical access center. Silvis also has two community college districts, a liberal arts college, a public university auxiliary campus, two private universities, and two extension services in the area.

== History ==
The City of Silvis (initially named Pleasant Valley) was incorporated in 1906. The city took its name from Richard Shippen Silvis, one of the original settlers whose family operated the Silvis Mining Company. Some older sources give the alternate spelling of "Sylvis" although this spelling is not regularly used today.

=== Rock Island Line Silvis Workshops ===
In 1902, the Rock Island Line decided to build its largest railroad locomotive repair workshop in Silvis, on a 900-acre site between the railroad's main line and the Chicago, Burlington and Quincy Railroad’s Rock Island branch. Construction began on May 1, 1903; the facilities eventually included a general stores department, repair shop, 45-stall roundhouse with a 90-foot turntable, and two large freight yards east and west.

The need for cheap labor attracted a number of immigrants from Mexico, who worked in the stores, the workshops, or as part of the track laboring team. The railway developed housing for all of its workers and families. This was rented to the workers at favorable rates, which were possible under an agreement with the town that meant the occupants paid no property taxes. The Mexican section, with its own Mexican-run general stores and a Mexican-themed band, became known as La Yarda. When the band waned, the railway-donated boxcars that had once housed its instruments were refurbished to create the Lady of Guadalupe church, dedicated on Easter Sunday in 1927. In 1929 the no-property-tax agreement came to an end, and the city authorities evicted the railway workers. Many moved their houses to the area that became second, third and fourth streets.

After The Rock was liquidated in 1980, the locomotive workshops, yards and facilities were used for storage of locomotives and railcars that soon would be sold off to other railroads. The facility later was sold to National Railway Equipment, with the workshops remaining a maintenance and refurbishment hub for the wider North American railroad industry. Railroading Heritage of Midwest America bought the facility in late 2021 to develop a museum and for refurbishing and maintaining steam and heritage diesel locomotives along with associated rolling stock. In November 2022 heritage equipment from the Union Pacific was moved into the shop. Included were 4-6-6-4 Union Pacific 3985, 2-10-2 Union Pacific 5511 and EMD DDA40X Union Pacific 6936.

=== Golf course ===
The city is home to TPC Deere Run, a public golf course designed by former PGA Tour professional D.A. Weibring along the area's famous Rock River. Golf Digest once ranked it No. 42 among U.S. public golf courses, while Golfweek Magazine has called it among the state's top five courses. Since 2000, TPC Deere Run has hosted the PGA Tour's annual John Deere Classic, previously known as the Quad Cities Open. The John Deere Classic is held in July the week before the British Open.

=== Hero Street USA ===
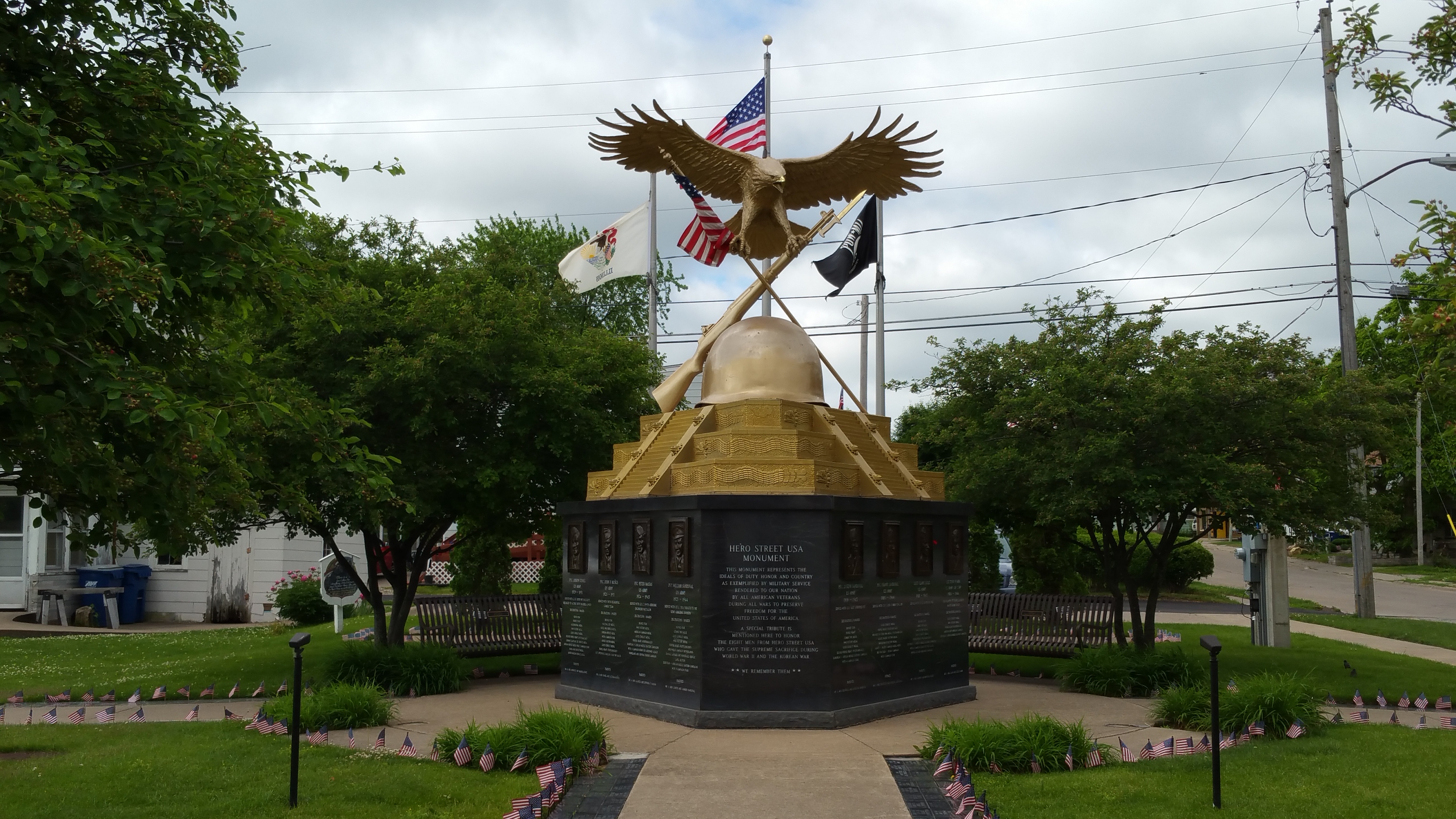
Hero Street Monument

The name of the city's Second Street—a muddy two-block thoroughfare that was once home to Mexican immigrants who worked for the Rock Island Railroad—was changed in 1967 to Hero Street to honor people who lived on the two-block street and served in the U.S. military. A total of 84 men served in World War II, Korea, and in Vietnam. Eight died during World War II: Joseph Gomez, Peter Macias, Johnny Muños, Tony Pompa, Frank Sandoval, Joseph "Joe" Sandoval, William "Willie" Sandoval, and Claro Solis.

Eduvigis and Angelina Sandoval immigrated to the U.S. from Romita, Mexico. Their son, Frank, was a combat engineer assigned to help build the Ledo Road in Burma. He was killed when his unit was sent to the front to fight for control of a key airbase. His older brother, Joe, assigned to the 41st Armored Infantry Division in Europe, was killed in April 1945, just days before the war ended.

Joseph and Carmen Sandoval also immigrated to the United States from Mexico. When the war broke out, they consented to their son Willie's request to enlist in the army. Trained as a paratrooper and assigned to the 82nd Airborne Division, he fought in Italy and Germany, and was killed on October 6, 1944, during a combat mission related to Operation Market-Garden, the largest airborne operation of all time.

Silvis Mayor, William Tatmen renamed the street Hero Street USA in May 1967. On 30 October 1971 a city park was built and dedicated as Hero Street Park to honor the eight deceased Hispanic (Latin American) servicemen from Hero Street USA. The park contains a pictorial monument, a grotto, a playground, and a pavilion. The monument contains pictures and biographies of the eight-deceased veteran from Hero Street, the grotto displays the names of all war dead from Silvis.

In 2015, Fourth Wall Films released a documentary, "Letters Home to Hero Street", by Emmy-nominated filmmakers Kelly and Tammy Rundle.

== Demographics ==
Historical population
Census	Pop.	Note	%±
1910	1,163		—
1920	2,541		118.5%
1930	2,650		4.3%
1940	2,990		12.8%
1950	3,055		2.2%
1960	3,973		30.0%
1970	5,907		48.7%
1980	7,130		20.7%
1990	6,926		−2.9%
2000	7,269		5.0%
2010	7,479		2.9%
2020	8,003		7.0%
U.S. Decennial Census

=== Racial and ethnic composition ===
Silvas city, Illinois – Racial and ethnic composition Note: the US Census treats Hispanic/Latino as an ethnic category. This table excludes Latinos from the racial categories and assigns them to a separate category. Hispanics/Latinos may be of any race.
Race / Ethnicity (NH = Non-Hispanic)	Pop 2000	Pop 2010	Pop 2020	% 2000	% 2010	% 2020
White alone (NH)	5,831	5,666	5,366	80.22%	75.76%	67.05%
Black or African American alone (NH)	245	359	731	3.37%	4.80%	9.13%
Native American or Alaska Native alone (NH)	19	12	20	0.26%	0.16%	0.25%
Asian alone (NH)	57	87	174	0.78%	1.16%	2.17%
Native Hawaiian or Pacific Islander alone (NH)	0	4	1	0.00%	0.05%	0.01%
Other race alone (NH)	0	3	25	0.00%	0.04%	0.31%
Mixed race or Multiracial (NH)	73	150	332	1.00%	2.01%	4.15%
Hispanic or Latino (any race)	1,044	1,198	1,354	14.36%	16.02%	16.92%
Total	7,269	7,479	8,003	100.00%	100.00%	100.00%

=== 2020 census ===
As of the 2020 census, Silvis had a population of 8,003. The median age was 41.6 years. 22.6% of residents were under the age of 18 and 21.8% of residents were 65 years of age or older. For every 100 females there were 93.4 males, and for every 100 females age 18 and over there were 89.7 males age 18 and over.

99.7% of residents lived in urban areas, while 0.3% lived in rural areas.

There were 3,537 households in Silvis, of which 26.4% had children under the age of 18 living in them. Of all households, 38.2% were married-couple households, 22.1% were households with a male householder and no spouse or partner present, and 32.3% were households with a female householder and no spouse or partner present. About 38.1% of all households were made up of individuals and 17.7% had someone living alone who was 65 years of age or older.

There were 3,893 housing units, of which 9.1% were vacant. The homeowner vacancy rate was 3.3% and the rental vacancy rate was 11.4%.

=== 2000 census ===
As of the 2000 census, there were 7,269 people, 2,984 households, and 1,939 families residing in the city. The population density was 1,994 inhabitants per square mile (770/km^{2}). There were 3,135 housing units at an average density of 860 per square mile (330/km^{2}). The racial makeup of the city was 86.09% White, 3.45% African American, 0.47% Native American, 0.81% Asian, 6.51% from other races, and 2.67% from two or more races. Hispanic or Latino ethnicities made up 14.36% of the population.

There were 2,984 households, out of which 31.4% had children under the age of 18, 47.2% were married couples, 13.8% had a female householder with no husband present, and 35.0% were non-families. 30.9% of all households were made up of individuals, and 15.8% had someone living alone who was 65 years of age or older. The average household size was 2.41, and the average family size was 3.01.

In the city, the population was 25.6% under the age of 18, 8.9% aged 18 to 24, 26.9% aged 25 to 44, 22.3% aged 45 to 64, and 16.3% who were 65 years of age or older. The median age was 38 years. For every 100 females, there were 91.4 males. For every 100 females aged 18 and over, there were 86.5 males.

The median income for a household in the city was $35,047, and the median income for a family was $41,390. Males had a median income of $32,451, versus $22,050 for females. The per capita income for the city was $16,764. About 8.4% of families and 9.5% of the population were below the poverty line, including 14.9% of those under age 18 and 6.5% of those age 65 or over.

== Education ==
Portions of Silvis are divided between three elementary school districts: Silvis School District 34, East Moline School District 37, and Carbon Cliff-Barstow School District 36. All of it is in the United Township High School District 30.

There are three Silvis school district: preschool schools., three elementary schools, one junior high school and one high school belonging to the Silvis school districts.

Preschools

- George O. Barr Elementary
- Learning Tree Child Care Center
- It's a Child's World

Elementary schools

- George O. Barr Elementary
- Eagle Ridge
- Bowlesburg Elementary

Middle/Junior High schools

- North East Junior High School

United Township High School is the high school for all parts of Silvis.

== Transportation ==
Quad Cities MetroLINK provides bus service on multiple routes connecting Silvis to destinations across the Quad Cities.
