= Tapio Pulkkanen =

Finnish professional golfer (born 1990)

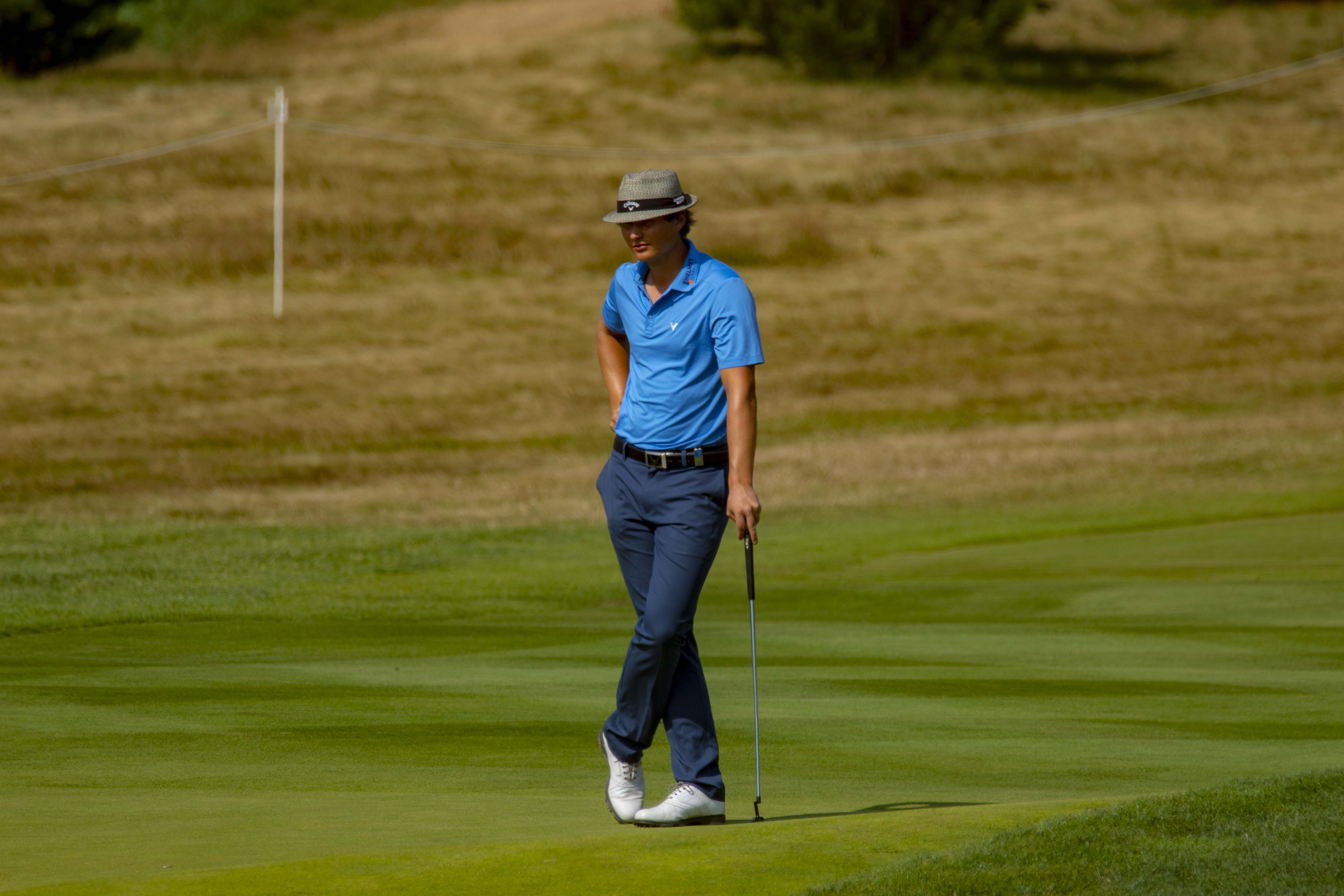
- Pulkkanen in 2018

Personal information
- Nationality: Finland
- Born: 21 May 1990 (age 36) Kotka, Finland
- Height: 6 ft 2 in (188 cm)
- Weight: 185 lb (84 kg)

Career
- Sport: Golf
- Turned professional: 2013
- Current tour: European Tour
- Former tours: Challenge Tour; Nordic Golf League
- Professional wins: 10

Number of wins by tour
- Challenge Tour: 2
- Other: 8

Achievements and awards
- Danish Golf Tour Order of Merit winner: 2015
- Nordic Golf League Order of Merit winner: 2015
- Challenge Tour Rankings winner: 2017

Tapio Pulkkanen (born 21 May 1990) is a Finnish professional golfer, who plays on the European Tour. He won the 2015 Nordic Golf League and the 2017 Challenge Tour Order of Merit. He is known for wearing a trilby hat.

== Early years ==
Pulkkanen was born in Kotka, 130 kilometres east of Helsinki in southern Finland. Introduced to the game by his brother, he began playing golf at age 9 at Kymen Golf on the island of Mussalö outside Kotka. At 12 years old, he made his first hole-in-one. At 14 years of age, he quit soccer, to concentrate on golf. He has described that he had a group of boys to practice and compete with at his home club and at the same time, in contrast to a team sport, was responsible for his own game.

== Amateur career ==
At age 16, Pulkkanen represented his country abroad for the first time, at the European Young Masters in Austria. The year after, he played for Finland at the European Boys' Team Championship in Denmark. His last year as a junior, he won the Finnish Junior Championship. He also won the Finnish Championship twice.

During his amateur years, Pulkkanen represented Finland at the European Amateur Team Championship three times and at the Eisenhower Trophy twice. At the 2011 European Amateur Team Championship, Pulkkanen finished tied 7th individually in the stroke-play competition, against a 120-man field, which included future European Tour winners Thomas Pieters, Alexander Lévy, Adrián Otaegui and Andy Sullivan. The Finnish team won their last game against Ireland to finish 7th in the championship.

In 2012, still an amateur, he won a professional tournament on the Nordic Golf League, the Finnish Open at Vuosaari Golf.

Pulkkanen's best ranking on the World Amateur Golf Ranking was 46th.

== Professional career ==
Pulkkanen turned professional in early 2013 and was runner-up in his first tournament on the Challenge Tour, the Challenge de Madrid in April. The remainder of 2013 and 2014 were disappointing with a best finish of 34th place.

Pulkkanen played on the Nordic Golf League in 2015, won five events and headed the Order Of Merit. The return to the Challenge Tour in 2016 was again a disappointment with a best finish of 30th place. His 2017 Challenge Tour season started with a second place in the Turkish Airlines Challenge, followed up with another runner-up finish in the D+D Real Czech Challenge. Later in the year he had his first win, taking the Kazakhstan Open after a playoff with Chase Koepka. He finished first in the 2017 Challenge Tour Order of Merit to earn his European Tour card for 2018.

In December 2017, Pulkkanen was tied for third in the Joburg Open, level with Shaun Norris. The event was part of the Open Qualifying Series, with three places available to the 2018 Open Championship. Norris received the entry because he had a higher world ranking, 192 to Pulkkanen's 197. Later in the 2017–18 European Tour season, Pulkkanen earned his biggest paycheck at the Alfred Dunhill Links Championship at the three championship courses of Carnoustie, Kingsbarns and St Andrews Old Course in Scotland, finishing 4th for €208,728.

Pulkkanen is coached by Tommi Nousiainen and his agent is Johan Elliot at Sportyard International in Stockholm, Sweden. His main equipment sponsor is Callaway.

== Professional wins (10) ==
=== Challenge Tour wins (2) ===
| No. | Date | Tournament | Winning score | Margin of victory | Runner-up |
|---|---|---|---|---|---|
| 1 | 24 Sep 2017 | Kazakhstan Open | −17 (67-70-66-68=271) | Playoff | (United States) Chase Koepka |
| 2 | 24 May 2026 | Danish Golf Challenge | −18 (71-63-63-73=270) | Playoff | (France) Maxence Giboudot |

Challenge Tour playoff record (2–0)

| No. | Year | Tournament | Opponent | Result |
|---|---|---|---|---|
| 1 | 2017 | Kazakhstan Open | (United States) Chase Koepka | Won with par on third extra hole |
| 2 | 2026 | Danish Golf Challenge | (France) Maxence Giboudot | Won with eagle on first extra hole |

=== Nordic Golf League wins (8) ===
| No. | Date | Tournament | Winning score | Margin of victory | Runner-up |
|---|---|---|---|---|---|
| 1 | 30 Aug 2009 | FGT IV (as an amateur) | −9 (70-66-71=207) | 4 strokes | (Finland) Joonas Hinkkanen |
| 2 | 11 Sep 2010 | Finnish Tour 6 (as an amateur) | −10 (67-67-72=206) | 2 strokes | (Finland) Mikael Salminen (a) |
| 3 | 14 Jul 2012 | TehoSport Finnish Open (as an amateur) | −14 (66-68-68=202) | 4 strokes | (Sweden) Pontus Leijon |
| 4 | 8 May 2015 | NorthSide Charity Challenge | −7 (71-72-66=209) | Playoff | (Denmark) Thomas Nørret |
| 5 | 26 Jun 2015 | ECCO German Masters | −8 (71-70-70=211) | 3 strokes | (Norway) Christian Aronsen |
| 6 | 12 Jul 2015 | Finnish Open (2) | −9 (67-71-69=207) | 4 strokes | (Denmark) Rasmus Hjelm Nielsen |
| 7 | 31 Jul 2015 | Made in Denmark Qualifier | −5 (69-67-75=211) | Playoff | (Sweden) Eric Blom |
| 8 | 13 Sep 2015 | Kristianstad Åhus Open | −8 (70-71-67=208) | 3 strokes | (Denmark) Daniel Løkke |

== Team appearances ==
Amateur

- European Boys' Team Championship (representing Finland): 2007, 2008
- European Amateur Team Championship (representing Finland): 2009, 2010, 2011
- Eisenhower Trophy (representing Finland): 2010, 2012
- St Andrews Trophy (representing the Continent of Europe): 2012 (winners)

== See also ==
- 2017 Challenge Tour graduates
- 2024 Challenge Tour graduates
- 2026 Challenge Tour graduates
