= Dříteč =

- Municipality
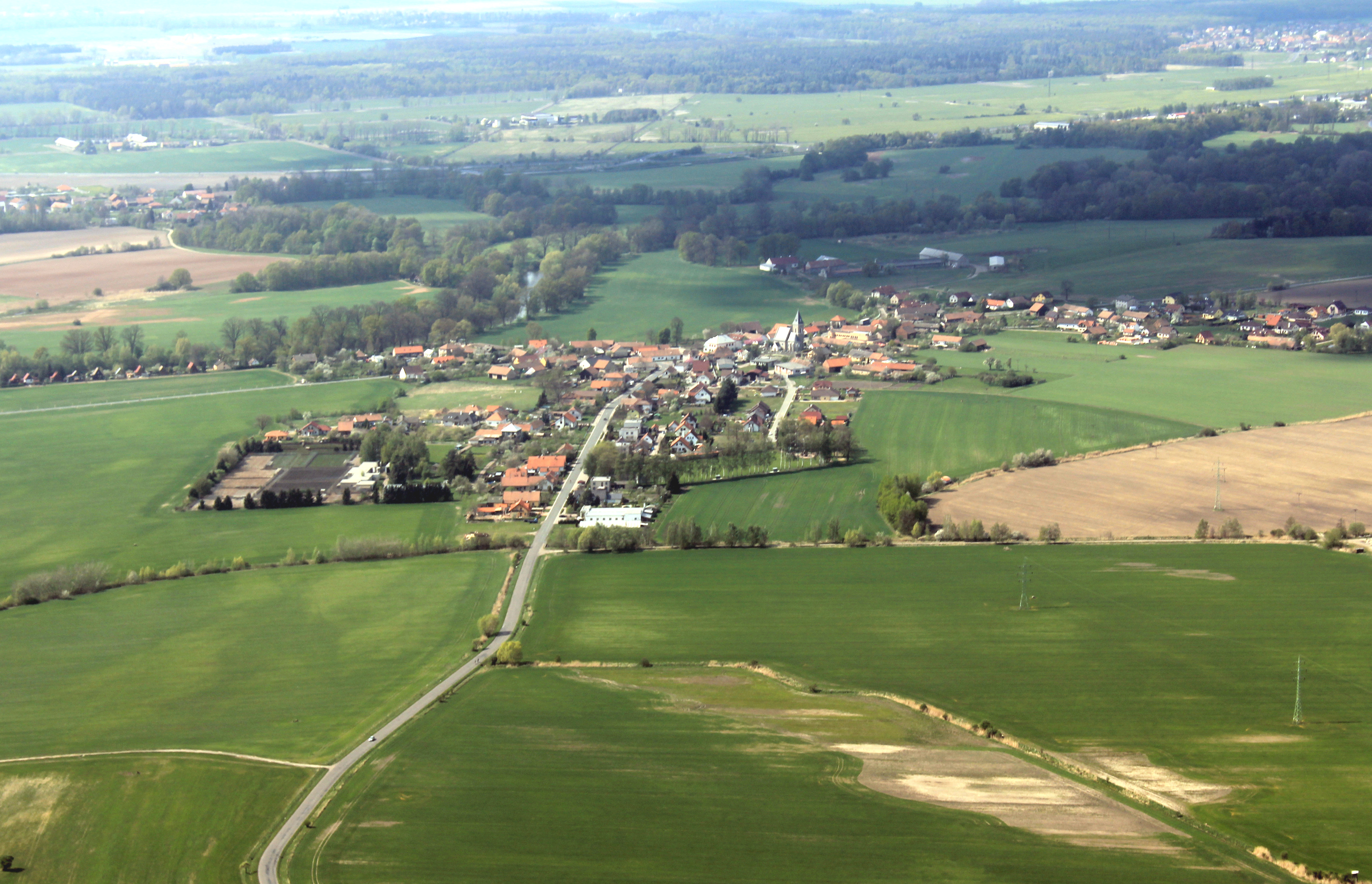
- Aerial view

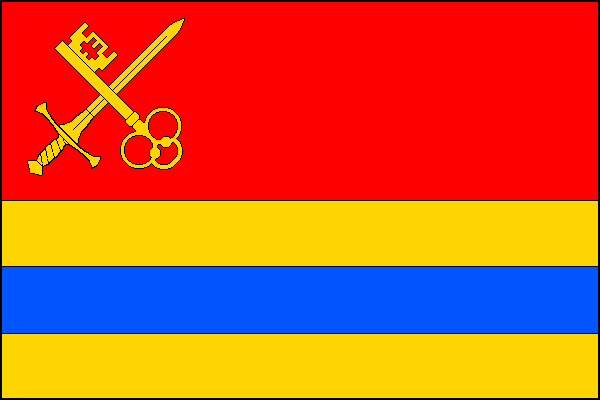
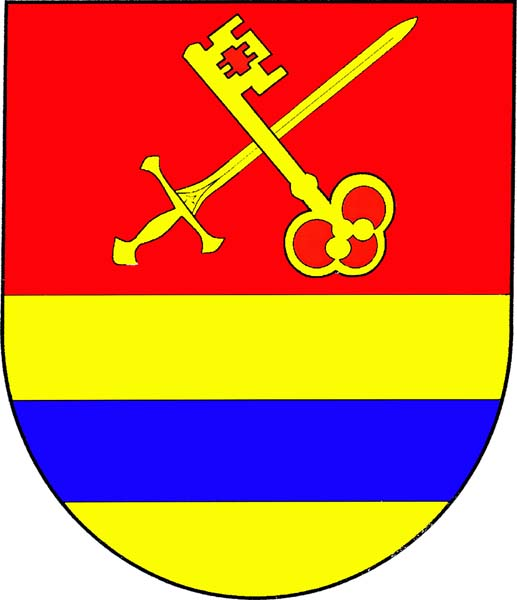
- Flag Coat of arms

- Location in the Czech Republic
- Coordinates: 50°6′18″N 15°48′32″E
- Country: Czech Republic
- Region: Pardubice
- District: Pardubice
- First mentioned: 1229

Area
  - Total: 5.37 km^{2} (2.07 sq mi)
- Elevation: 225 m (738 ft)

Population (2026-01-01)
  - Total: 666
  - Density: 124/km^{2} (321/sq mi)
- Time zone: UTC+1 (CET)
  - Summer (DST): UTC+2 (CEST)
- Postal code: 533 05
- Website: www.dritec.cz

Dříteč is a municipality and village in Pardubice District in the Pardubice Region of the Czech Republic. It has about 700 inhabitants.

== History ==
The first written mention of Dříteč is from 1229.

== Demographics ==
Historical population
Year	Pop.	±%
1869	440	—
1880	447	+1.6%
1890	438	−2.0%
1900	401	−8.4%
1910	389	−3.0%
1921	390	+0.3%
1930	387	−0.8%
1950	344	−11.1%
1961	350	+1.7%
1970	309	−11.7%
1980	301	−2.6%
1991	243	−19.3%
2001	237	−2.5%
2011	406	+71.3%
2021	588	+44.8%
Source: Censuses

== Sights ==
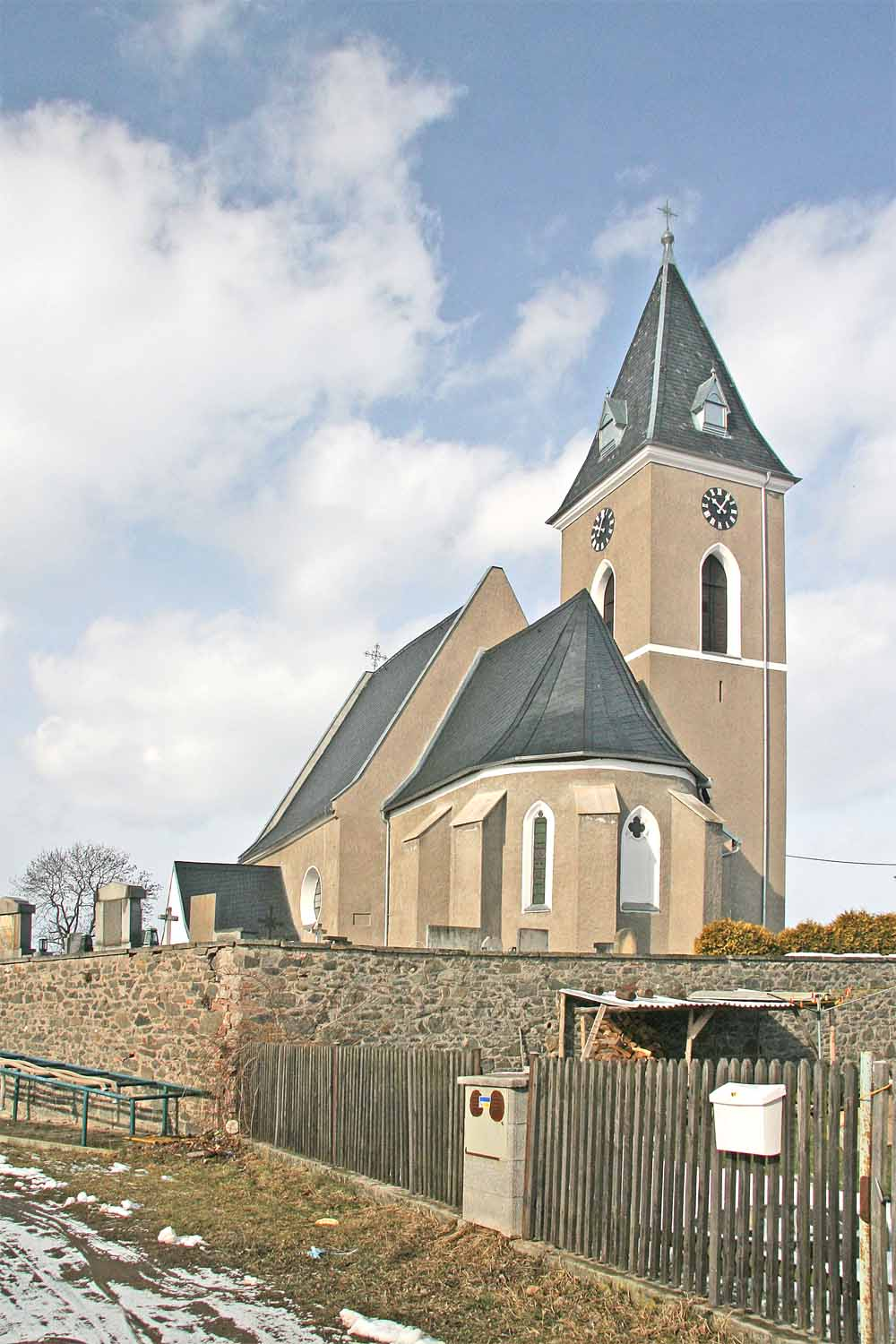
Church of Saints Peter and Paul

The main landmark is the Church of Saints Peter and Paul. It is a Gothic building from 1336.
