= Oklahoma Christian Eagles and Lady Eagles =

Oklahoma Christian Eagles
- University: Oklahoma Christian University
- Conference: LSC (primary); RMAC (swimming)
- NCAA: Division II
- Athletic director: David Lynn
- Location: Oklahoma City, Oklahoma
- Varsity teams: 18 (7 men's, 9 women's, 2 co-ed)
- Basketball arena: Payne Athletic Center
- Baseball stadium: Dobson Field
- Softball stadium: Tom Heath Field at Lawson Plaza
- Soccer stadium: Eagle Soccer Field
- Aquatics center: Mitch Park YMCA
- Tennis venue: OCU Tennis Courts
- Other venues: Dave Smith Athletic Center
- Mascot: Ike
- Nickname: Eagles
- Colors: Maroon and silver
- Website: oceagles.com
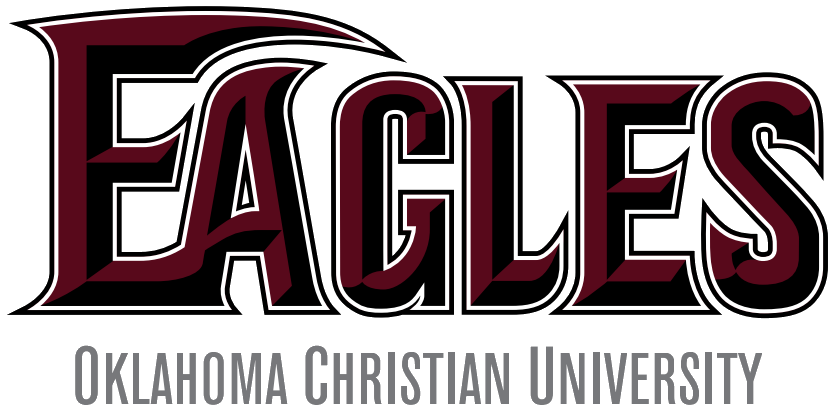

The Oklahoma Christian Eagles and Lady Eagles (also OC Eagles) are the athletic teams that represent Oklahoma Christian University, located in Oklahoma City, Oklahoma, in intercollegiate sports as a member of the NCAA Division II ranks, primarily competing in the Lone Star Conference (LSC) since the 2019–20 academic year. They were also a member of the National Christian College Athletic Association (NCCAA), primarily competing as an independent in the Central Region of the Division I level from 2012–13 to 2018–19. The Eagles and Lady Eagles previously competed in the D-II Heartland Conference from 2012–13 to 2018–19; and in the Sooner Athletic Conference (SAC) of the National Association of Intercollegiate Athletics (NAIA) from 1978–79 to 2011–12; and in the Texoma Athletic Conference from 1973–74 to 1977–78.

== Varsity teams ==
OC competes in 15 intercollegiate varsity sports. Men's sports include baseball, basketball, cross country, golf, soccer, swimming, and track & field. Women's sports include basketball, cross country, golf, soccer, softball, swimming, track & field, and volleyball. Club sports include men's and women's bowling, cheerleading, men's & women's disc golf, dance, eSports and ultimate frisbee.

=== Championships ===
Five OC teams garnered NAIA national championships before the transition to NCAA Division II: men's golf in 2009 and 2011, men's cross country in 2011, and men's tennis in 2003 and 2012. In addition, numerous OC athletes won individual NAIA national titles in golf, tennis, cross country, and track & field.

In fall 2012, Oklahoma Christian won NCCAA national championships in men's cross country and men's golf.
