= TPC Deere Run =

Golf course in Silvis, Illinois, United States

- Location within the United States Location within Illinois
- 41.478°N 90.392°W

Club information
- Location: Silvis, Illinois
- Elevation: 650 feet (200 m)
- Established: 2000; 26 years ago
- Type: Public
- Operator: PGA Tour TPC Network
- Tota holes: 18
- Tournaments: John Deere Classic (2000–present)
- Greens: L-93 Bentgrass
- Fairways: Southshore Bentgrass
- Website: Official website
- Designed by: D. A. Weibring
- Par: 71
- Length: 7,258 yards (6,637 m)
- Course rating: 75.8
- Slope rating: 144
- Course record: 59, Paul Goydos (2010), Hayden Springer (2024)

TPC Deere Run is an 18-hole golf course in the central United States, located in Silvis, Illinois, along the Rock River. It is operated by the PGA Tour as a member of their Tournament Players Club network of golf courses and plays host to the annual John Deere Classic, part of the tour's regular season schedule. It is usually held in July, the week preceding The Open Championship.

TPC Deere Run was designed as a stadium course by D. A. Weibring Golf Resources, in association with PGA TOUR Design Services, and plays 7,258 yards (6,637 m) to a par of 71 from the championship tees.

The course record is 59, shot by Paul Goydos in the opening round of the John Deere Classic in 2010. This was matched by Hayden Springer in the 2024 edition.

== Course ==
TPC Deere Run is maintained by superintendent Jonathan Graham. The longest hole is number 10, a 596-yard par 5. The shortest is number 16, a 158-yard par 3. The greens use L-93 Bentgrass and the fairways are Southshore Bentgrass.

== Scorecard ==
TPC Deere Run
Tee	Rating/Slope	1	2	3	4	5	6	7	8	9	Out	10	11	12	13	14	15	16	17	18	In	Total
John Deere Classic	75.8 / 144	395	561	186	454	433	367	226	428	503	3553	596	432	215	414	361	484	158	569	476	3705	7258
Par		4	5	3	4	4	4	3	4	4	35	5	4	3	4	4	4	3	5	4	36	71
SI		17	7	9	3	5	13	15	11	1		8	6	12	18	16	2	14	10	4
Black	74.8 / 142	391	551	183	448	429	361	224	380	485	3452	581	428	208	418	357	456	153	550	463	3614	7066
Blue	72.4 / 136	359	504	157	418	411	337	189	371	456	3202	512	392	178	386	326	429	140	504	433	3300	6502
Blue/White	71.2 / 133	344	504	140	418	401	337	165	371	410	3090	512	387	178	352	326	398	140	504	382	3179	6269
White	M: 69.9 / 130 L: 74.7 / 135	344	477	140	356	401	310	161	349	410	2948	487	387	158	352	301	398	114	481	382	3060	6008
White/Gold	M: 67.9 / 125 L: 72.3 / 129	313	477	123	356	284	310	129	349	348	2689	487	318	158	325	301	366	114	481	324	2874	5563
Gold	M:66.2 / 121 L: 70.2 / 125	313	407	123	305	284	248	129	313	348	2470	466	318	131	325	273	366	76	430	324	2709	5179
