= 2017 Challenge Tour =

Golf tour season

2017 Challenge Tour season
- Duration: 23 March 2017 – 4 November 2017
- Number of official events: 27
- Most wins: (England) Aaron Rai (3)
- Rankings: (Finland) Tapio Pulkkanen

The 2017 Challenge Tour was the 29th season of the Challenge Tour, the official development tour to the European Tour.

== Schedule ==
The following table lists official events during the 2017 season.

Date	Tournament	Host country	Purse (€)	Winner (Note: The number in brackets after each winner's name is the number of Challenge Tour events they had won up to and including that tournament. This information is only shown for Challenge Tour members. It is rare for someone to accumulate many wins on the Challenge Tour as success at this level usually leads to promotion to the European Tour.)	OWGR points	Other tours (Note: CHN − China Tour; EUR − European Tour.)	Notes
26 Mar	Barclays Kenya Open	Kenya	220,000	(England) Aaron Rai (1)	12		
23 Apr	Turkish Airlines Challenge	Turkey	200,000	(England) Ryan Evans (1)	12		
14 May	Open de Portugal	Portugal	500,000	(England) Matt Wallace (1)	18	EUR	
21 May	Andalucía Costa del Sol Match Play 9	Spain	200,000	(England) Aaron Rai (2)	12		New tournament
28 May	D+D Real Czech Challenge	Czech Republic	180,000	(United States) Julian Suri (1)	12		
4 Jun	Swiss Challenge	Switzerland	170,000	(Switzerland) Joel Girrbach (1)	12		
11 Jun	KPMG Trophy	Belgium	170,000	(Austria) Martin Wiegele (4)	12		
18 Jun	Hauts de France Golf Open	France	200,000	(France) Julien Guerrier (1)	12		
25 Jun	Made in Denmark Challenge	Denmark	180,000	(Sweden) Oscar Stark (1)	12		
2 Jul	SSE Scottish Hydro Challenge	Scotland	250,000	(England) Richard McEvoy (2)	12		
9 Jul	Prague Golf Challenge	Czech Republic	180,000	(England) Garrick Porteous (1)	12		New tournament
16 Jul	Italian Challenge Open	Italy	300,000	(Sweden) Joel Sjöholm (1)	12		
23 Jul	Le Vaudreuil Golf Challenge	France	210,000	(England) Aaron Rai (3) (Note: Rai earned immediate promotion to the European Tour, as this was his third win of the season.)	12		
30 Jul	Swedish Challenge	Sweden	200,000	(Argentina) Estanislao Goya (3)	12		
6 Aug	Vierumäki Finnish Challenge	Finland	180,000	(England) Paul Howard (1)	12		
13 Aug	Galgorm Resort & Spa Northern Ireland Open	Northern Ireland	185,000	(France) Robin Sciot-Siegrist (1)	12		
20 Aug	Viking Challenge	Norway	200,000	(France) Clément Sordet (3)	12		
26 Aug	Rolex Trophy	Switzerland	250,000	(Spain) Pedro Oriol (1)	12		
3 Sep	Cordon Golf Open	France	210,000	(Iceland) Birgir Hafþórsson (1)	12		
10 Sep	Bridgestone Challenge	England	180,000	(Sweden) Oscar Lengdén (1)	12		
17 Sep	Irish Challenge	Ireland	180,000	(France) Julien Guerrier (2)	12		
24 Sep	Kazakhstan Open	Kazakhstan	450,000	(Finland) Tapio Pulkkanen (1)	13		
1 Oct	Challenge de España	Spain	200,000	(France) Victor Perez (1)	12		
15 Oct	Hainan Open	China	US$350,000	(South Africa) Erik van Rooyen (1)	13	CHN	
22 Oct	Foshan Open	China	US$500,000	(Wales) Oliver Farr (2)	13	CHN	
28 Oct	Ras Al Khaimah Golf Challenge	UAE	US$350,000	(Sweden) Jens Dantorp (2)	13		
4 Nov	NBO Golf Classic Grand Final	Oman	420,000	(France) Clément Sordet (4)	17		Flagship event

== Rankings ==
The rankings were titled as the Road to Oman and were based on tournament results during the season, calculated using a points-based system. The top 15 players on the rankings earned status to play on the 2018 European Tour.

Rank	Player	Points
1	(Finland) Tapio Pulkkanen	210,799
2	(France) Clément Sordet	181,312
3	(South Africa) Erik van Rooyen	160,876
4	(England) Aaron Rai	139,435
5	(Sweden) Marcus Kinhult	139,419
