= Tom McKibbin (golfer) =

Northern Irish professional golfer (born 2002)

Personal information
- Nationality: Northern Ireland
- Born: 19 December 2002 (age 23) Belfast, Northern Ireland
- Height: 6 ft 0 in (183 cm)
- Weight: 160 lb (73 kg)

Career
- Sport: Golf
- Turned professional: 2021
- Current tours: LIV Golf; European Tour
- Former tour: Challenge Tour
- Professional wins: 3
- Highest ranking: 74 (11 January 2026) (as of 25 October 2026)

Number of wins by tour
- European Tour: 1
- Asian Tour: 1
- Other: 1

Best results in major championships
- Masters Tournament: CUT: 2026
- PGA Championship: T50: 2025
- U.S. Open: T41: 2024
- The Open Championship: T66: 2024

Tom McKibbin (born 19 December 2002) is a Northern Irish professional golfer who plays on LIV Golf and the European Tour, where he has won once.

== Early life and amateur career ==
McKibbin was born on 19 December 2002 in Belfast. He grew up in Newtownabbey, and was an only child. His mother Sara was a bank manager, and his father Robin was an intellectual property rights manager. Neither of McKibbin's parents had a background in golf. He originally played football and was introduced to golf by a teammate's father, who took him to a driving range at age seven. He displayed natural ability and weeks later he began to receive instruction from coach Johnny Foster, who also coached Gareth Maybin. McKibbin grew up playing golf at Greenisland Golf Club, Greenacres Golf Club and Holywood Golf Club, the same home club as Rory McIlroy.

In 2015, McKibbin won the U12 World Junior Championship held in Pinehurst, North Carolina. At age 13, he made his debut in a professional tournament at the 2016 Northern Ireland Open on the Challenge Tour, after receiving an invite from the management company owned by Niall Horan. He shot rounds of 80 and 76 to miss the cut.

McKibbin won the Peter McEvoy Trophy in April 2019. He chipped in for birdie to prevail in a three-way playoff for the title. The following week, McKibbin won the Junior Invitational. He shot 64-75-71 to win by one stroke over Maxwell Moldovan.

In January 2020, McKibbin made it to the final of the Australian Amateur at Royal Queensland. He was defeated 5 and 3 by Jediah Morgan.

McKibbin graduated from the Belfast Royal Academy. He verbally committed to play collegiate golf for the University of Florida, but the COVID-19 pandemic derailed this plan. He subsequently decided to forgo university and turn professional. His timeline for turning professional was accelerated after he was not selected for the 2021 Walker Cup.

== Professional career ==
McKibbin turned professional in April 2021 at the age of 18. He made his professional debut at the Tenerife Open on the European Tour, where he shot 70-70 and missed the cut.

McKibbin won his first professional event in January 2022 on the Minor League Golf Tour in Florida. He spent most of 2022 playing on the Challenge Tour. He was in contention to win at the Bain's Whisky Cape Town Open in February. A final-round 73 saw him miss out and finish tied-for-third. He also finished solo second at the Irish Challenge at the K Club in July. In November, at the Rolex Challenge Tour Grand Final, McKibbin shot a final-round 66 to finish tied-sixth and lift him to 10th place in the Challenge Tour Rankings, ultimately gaining a card for the 2023 European Tour season.

In February 2023, McKibbin held the 36-hole lead at the Singapore Classic on the European Tour. In June, McKibbin claimed his first win on the European Tour at the Porsche European Open in Germany. He shot a final-round 70 to win by two shots ahead of Julien Guerrier, Maximilian Kieffer and Marcel Siem.

In June 2024, McKibbin shot a final-round 65 to tie the lead at the Italian Open with Marcel Siem. He was defeated on the first extra hole. McKibbin finished the 2024 European Tour season 18th place on the Race to Dubai, which was good enough to earn the last of the 10 available PGA Tour cards for 2025.

In January 2025, McKibbin joined LIV Golf for the 2025 season for a reported £4 million. He was signed onto Legion XIII, joining Jon Rahm, Tyrrell Hatton and Caleb Surratt, also becoming the second Northern Irish player to play on LIV Golf alongside Graeme McDowell.

In November 2025, McKibbin won the Link Hong Kong Open on the Asian Tour. He shot a tournament-record score of 27-under 253 to finish seven strokes ahead of runner-up Peter Uihlein. With the win, McKibbin earned exemptions in the 2026 Masters Tournament and 2026 Open Championship. At the 2026 Masters Tournament, he became the 18th Irishman to play at the tournament. In October 2026, McKibbin announced that he would not be joining LIV 2.0 and planned to play full time on the DP World Tour instead.

== Amateur wins ==
- 2018 Major Champions Invitational
- 2019 Peter McEvoy Trophy, Junior Invitational

== Professional wins (3) ==
=== European Tour wins (1) ===
No.	Date	Tournament	Winning score	Margin of victory	Runners-up
1	4 Jun 2023	Porsche European Open	−9 (72-69-72-70=283)	2 strokes	(France) Julien Guerrier, (Germany) Maximilian Kieffer, (Germany) Marcel Siem

European Tour playoff record (0–1)

No.	Year	Tournament	Opponent	Result
1	2024	Italian Open	(Germany) Marcel Siem	Lost to birdie on first extra hole

=== Asian Tour wins (1) ===
Legend
International Series (1)
Other Asian Tour (0)

No.	Date	Tournament	Winning score	Margin of victory	Runner-up
1	2 Nov 2025	Link Hong Kong Open	−27 (60-65-65-63=253)	7 strokes	(United States) Peter Uihlein

=== Minor League Golf Tour wins (1) ===
No.	Date	Tournament	Winning score	Margin of victory	Runner-up
1	11 Jan 2022	Major I	−12 (66-62=128)	1 stroke	(United States) Eric Cole

== Results in major championships ==
Tournament	2024	2025	2026
Masters Tournament			CUT
PGA Championship		T50	CUT
U.S. Open	T41		
The Open Championship	T66	CUT	CUT

Did not play

CUT = missed the half-way cut
"T" indicates a tie for a place

== Team appearances ==
Amateur

- European Boys' Team Championship (representing Ireland): 2018, 2019
- Jacques Léglise Trophy (representing Great Britain & Ireland): 2018 (winners), 2019

Professional

- Team Cup (representing Great Britain and Ireland): 2025 (winners)

== See also ==
- 2022 Challenge Tour graduates
- 2024 Race to Dubai dual card winners
