= 2023 European Tour =

Golf tour season

2023 European Tour season
- Duration: 24 November 2022 – 19 November 2023
- Number of official events: 45
- Most wins: (Poland) Adrian Meronk (3)
- Race to Dubai: (Northern Ireland) Rory McIlroy
- Player of the Year: (Poland) Adrian Meronk
- Sir Henry Cotton Rookie of the Year: (Japan) Ryo Hisatsune
- Graduate of the Year: (New Zealand) Daniel Hillier

The 2023 European Tour, titled as the 2023 DP World Tour for sponsorship reasons, was the 52nd season of the European Tour, the main professional golf tour in Europe since its inaugural season in 1972.

It was the second season of the tour under a title sponsorship agreement with DP World, that was announced in November 2021.

== Changes for 2023 ==
=== Player Earnings Assurance Programme ===
In November 2022, alongside the schedule release, the tour announced that they would introduce a "Player Earnings Assurance Programme", which would guarantee minimum earnings of US$150,000 for all exempt players from categories 1–17 if they competed in at least 15 tournaments.

=== Rankings name change ===
In November 2022, the tour announced that the DP World Tour Rankings would be reverted to the Race to Dubai, the name which had been in place between 2009 and 2021.

=== PGA Tour exemptions ===
As part of the PGA Tour strategic alliance expansion which had been signed in June 2022, the 2023 season saw the beginning of PGA Tour status being awarded to the top 10 players (not otherwise exempt) on the Race to Dubai.

=== Additions to the schedule ===
The Singapore Classic, SDC Championship, Jonsson Workwear Open (previously a Challenge Tour event) and the Korea Championship were added to the schedule. The ISPS Handa Australian Open was also added to the schedule as a co-sanctioned event with the PGA Tour of Australasia, the first time Australia's national open had gained European Tour status.

The ISPS Handa Championship in Japan returned to the schedule, having been removed in 2022. The Thailand Classic and the Hero Indian Open also returned to the schedule, having not been played since 2016 and 2019, respectively.

A new team event was created and also added to the schedule; the Hero Cup, which was played in January. Similarly to the defunct Seve Trophy, a team from Great Britain & Ireland competed against a team from Continental Europe. The event was used as a warm-up for the Ryder Cup matches in September.

== LIV Golf agreement ==
In June 2023, it was announced that the Public Investment Fund, the PGA Tour and the European Tour would create a new entity to serve the best interests of each entity.

== Schedule ==
The following table lists official events during the 2023 season.

Date	Tournament	Host country	Purse (US$)	R2D points	Winner (Note: The number in brackets after each winner's name is the number of European Tour events they had won up to and including that tournament. This information is only shown for European Tour members.)	OWGR points	Other tours (Note: AFR − Sunshine Tour; ANZ − PGA Tour of Australasia; JPN − Japan Golf Tour; KOR − Korean Tour; LET − Ladies European Tour; PGAT − PGA Tour; PGTI − Professional Golf Tour of India.)	Notes
27 Nov	Fortinet Australian PGA Championship	Australia	A$2,000,000	2,000	(Australia) Cameron Smith (n/a)	10.06	ANZ	
27 Nov	Joburg Open	South Africa	R17,500,000	2,000	(England) Dan Bradbury (1)	9.24	AFR	
4 Dec	ISPS Handa Australian Open	Australia	A$1,700,000	2,000	(Poland) Adrian Meronk (2)	10.26	ANZ	New to European Tour
4 Dec	Investec South African Open Championship	South Africa	1,500,000	2,000	(South Africa) Thriston Lawrence (3)	12.12	AFR	
11 Dec	Alfred Dunhill Championship	South Africa	€1,500,000	2,000	(South Africa) Ockie Strydom (1)	14.59	AFR	
18 Dec	AfrAsia Bank Mauritius Open	Mauritius	€1,000,000	2,000	(France) Antoine Rozner (3)	8.60	AFR	
22 Jan	Abu Dhabi HSBC Championship	UAE	9,000,000	8,000	(France) Victor Perez (3)	25.94		Rolex Series
30 Jan	Hero Dubai Desert Classic	UAE	9,000,000	8,000	(Northern Ireland) Rory McIlroy (15)	29.49		Rolex Series
5 Feb	Ras Al Khaimah Championship	UAE	2,000,000	2,750	(England) Daniel Gavins (2)	17.53		
12 Feb	Singapore Classic	Singapore	2,000,000	2,750	(South Africa) Ockie Strydom (2)	16.49		New tournament
19 Feb	Thailand Classic	Thailand	2,000,000	2,750	(Denmark) Thorbjørn Olesen (7)	15.97		
26 Feb	Hero Indian Open	India	2,000,000	2,750	(Germany) Marcel Siem (5)	9.29	PGTI	
12 Mar	Magical Kenya Open	Kenya	2,000,000	2,750	(Spain) Jorge Campillo (3)	14.34		
19 Mar	SDC Championship	South Africa	1,500,000	2,000	(England) Matthew Baldwin (1)	14.81	AFR	New tournament
26 Mar	Jonsson Workwear Open	South Africa	1,500,000	2,000	(Germany) Nick Bachem (1)	13.85	AFR	New to European Tour
26 Mar	WGC-Dell Technologies Match Play	United States	20,000,000	8,000	(United States) Sam Burns (n/a)	52.41		World Golf Championship
9 Apr	Masters Tournament	United States	18,000,000	10,000	(Spain) Jon Rahm (10)	100		Major championship
23 Apr	ISPS Handa Championship	Japan	2,000,000	2,750	(Australia) Lucas Herbert (3)	19.22	JPN	New to European Tour (Note: Tournament's debut on European Tour delayed from 2022.)
30 Apr	Korea Championship	South Korea	2,000,000	2,750	(Spain) Pablo Larrazábal (8)	17.05	KOR	New tournament
7 May	DS Automobiles Italian Open	Italy	3,250,000	4,250	(Poland) Adrian Meronk (3)	20.48		
14 May	Soudal Open	Belgium	2,000,000	2,750	(Sweden) Simon Forsström (1)	15.24		
21 May	PGA Championship	United States	17,500,000	10,000	(United States) Brooks Koepka (7)	100		Major championship
28 May	KLM Open	Netherlands	2,000,000	2,750	(Spain) Pablo Larrazábal (9)	18.57		
4 Jun	Porsche European Open	Germany	2,000,000	2,750	(Northern Ireland) Tom McKibbin (1)	18.10		
11 Jun	Volvo Car Scandinavian Mixed	Sweden	2,000,000	2,750	(England) Dale Whitnell (1)	12.25	LET	Mixed event (Note: Field of 78 men and 78 women playing from different sets of tees. Tour ranking and world ranking points based on finish among men's field only.)
18 Jun	U.S. Open	United States	20,000,000	10,000	(United States) Wyndham Clark (n/a)	100		Major championship
25 Jun	BMW International Open	Germany	2,000,000	2,750	(South Africa) Thriston Lawrence (4)	16.77		
2 Jul	Betfred British Masters	England	3,500,000	4,250	(New Zealand) Daniel Hillier (1)	20.55		
9 Jul	Made in HimmerLand	Denmark	3,250,000	4,250	(Denmark) Rasmus Højgaard (4)	16.53		
16 Jul	Genesis Scottish Open	Scotland	9,000,000	8,000	(Northern Ireland) Rory McIlroy (16)	62.26	PGAT	Rolex Series
16 Jul	Barbasol Championship	United States	3,800,000	4,250	(Sweden) Vincent Norrman (1)	15.95	PGAT	
23 Jul	The Open Championship	England	16,500,000	10,000	(United States) Brian Harman (n/a)	100		Major championship
23 Jul	Barracuda Championship	United States	3,800,000	4,250	(United States) Akshay Bhatia (n/a)	23.76	PGAT	
20 Aug	ISPS Handa World Invitational	Northern Ireland	1,500,000	2,000	(England) Dan Brown (1)	11.23		
27 Aug	D+D Real Czech Masters	Czech Republic	2,000,000	2,750	(England) Todd Clements (1)	20.09		
3 Sep	Omega European Masters	Switzerland	€2,500,000	3,500	(Sweden) Ludvig Åberg (1)	22.74		
10 Sep	Horizon Irish Open	Ireland	6,000,000	6,000	(Sweden) Vincent Norrman (2)	30.10		
17 Sep	BMW PGA Championship	England	9,000,000	8,000	(New Zealand) Ryan Fox (4)	39.10		Rolex Series
24 Sep	Cazoo Open de France	France	3,250,000	4,250	(Japan) Ryo Hisatsune (1)	20.71		
9 Oct	Alfred Dunhill Links Championship	Scotland	5,000,000	5,500	(England) Matt Fitzpatrick (9)	26.05		Pro-Am
15 Oct	Acciona Open de España	Spain	3,250,000	4,250	(France) Matthieu Pavon (1)	21.37		
22 Oct	Estrella Damm N.A. Andalucía Masters	Spain	3,750,000	4,250	(Poland) Adrian Meronk (4)	21.14		
29 Oct	Commercial Bank Qatar Masters	Qatar	3,750,000	4,250	(Finland) Sami Välimäki (2)	18.11		
12 Nov	Nedbank Golf Challenge	South Africa	6,000,000	7,000	(United States) Max Homa (n/a)	19.44		Limited-field event
19 Nov	DP World Tour Championship	UAE	10,000,000	12,000	(Denmark) Nicolai Højgaard (3)	27.72		Tour Championship (Note: Also a Rolex Series tournament.)

=== Unofficial events ===
The following events were sanctioned by the European Tour, but did not carry official money, nor were wins official.

Date	Tournament	Host country	Purse	Winners	OWGR points	Notes
15 Jan	Hero Cup	UAE	€2,000,000	Team Continental Europe	n/a	New team event
1 Oct	Ryder Cup	Italy	n/a	Team Europe	n/a	Team event

== Race to Dubai ==
=== Points distribution ===
The distribution of Race to Dubai points for 2023 European Tour events were as follows:

Finishing position	Total pts	1st	2nd	3rd	4th	5th	6th	7th	8th	9th	10th	20th	30th	40th	50th	60th
Major championships	10,000	1,665	1,113	627	500	424	350	300	250	223	200	120	90	68	48	30
Rolex Series & WGCs	8,000	1,335	889	500	400	339	280	240	200	178	160	96	72	54	38	24
Nedbank Golf Challenge	7,000	1,165	780	438	350	297	245	210	175	156	140	84	63	47	33	21
Regular tournament (Band 6) (Note: Tournaments with purses ranging from $5,000,000 to $5,499,999.)	5,500	915	612	345	275	234	192	165	138	123	110	66	50	37	28	17
Regular tournament (Band 4) (Note: Tournaments with purses ranging from $3,250,000 to $3,999,999.)	4,250	710	472	266	212	180	149	128	106	95	85	51	38	29	20	13
Regular tournament (Band 3) (Note: Tournaments with purses ranging from $2,500,000 to $3,249,999.)	3,500	585	389	218	175	148	123	105	88	78	70	42	32	24	17	11
Regular tournament (Band 2) (Note: Tournaments with purses ranging from $1,750,000 to $2,499,999.)	2,750	460	305	172	137	116	97	83	69	61	55	33	25	19	13	8
Regular tournament (Band 1) (Note: Tournaments with purses ranging from $1,000,000 to $1,749,999.)	2,000	335	222	125	100	84	70	60	50	44	40	24	18	14	10	6
DP World Tour Championship	12,000	2,000	1,335	752	600	509	420	359	300	267	240	144	108	82	58	36

=== Final standings ===
The Race to Dubai was based on tournament results during the season, calculated using a points-based system.

Pos.	Player	Majors				WGCs	Rolex Series					Top 10s in other ET events								Total pts	Tmts	Money (Note: In addition to tournament prize money, the top five point scorers received a share of a $5m bonus pool.)	
Pos.	Player	Mas	PGA	USO	Opn	WGC MP	Abu	Dub	Sco	BMW PGA	DPW TC	1	2	3	4	5	6	7	8	Total pts	Tmts	Reg. (€m)	Bon. ($m)
1	(Northern Ireland) McIlroy	CUT; 0	T7; 275	2nd 1113	T6; 325	3rd 500	•	1st 1335	1st 1335	T7; 206	T22; 131									5,296	10	7.5	2.0
2	(Denmark) N. Højgaard	•	T50; 45	•	T23; 98	•	T10; 132	T38; 50	T6; 212	T64; 20	1st 2000	T10; 33	T5; 98	T5; 152	3rd 172	T5; 125	2nd 780			3,985	17	4.4	1.2
3	(Spain) Rahm	1st 1665	T50; 45	T10; 179	T2; 666	T31; 54	•	•	•	4th 400	T5; 429	T9; 73								3,511	8	5.3	0.7
4	(Poland) Meronk	CUT; 0	T40; 59	CUT; 0	T23; 98	T17; 92	T10; 132	CUT; 0	CUT; 0	T28; 72	T32; 100	1st 335	T4; 127	1st 710	T5; 98	T3; 130	1st 710			2,969	24	2.4	0.6
5	(New Zealand) Fox	T26; 102	T23; 108	T43; 59	T52; 42	T17; 92	T65; 20	T20; 89	T12; 119	1st 1335	T34; 95	T3; 285	T2; 411							2,898	19	3.0	0.5
6	(Norway) Hovland	T7; 275	T2; 870	19th 123	T13; 151	T31; 54	•	•	T25; 73	5th 339	T2; 896									2,780	8	3.8	
7	(France) Perez	•	T12; 162	CUT; 0	T41; 59	T31; 54	1st 1335	T28; 69	T35; 58	CUT; 0	8th 300	T9; 75	T9; 83							2,406	22	2.5	
8	(England) Fleetwood	33rd 84	T18; 121	T5; 358	T10; 185	T52; 32	T38; 52	T59; 24	T6; 212	6th 280	T2; 896									2,356	12	2.9	
9	(Denmark) Olesen	•	CUT; 0	•	CUT; 0	•	T20; 88	T16; 106	T25; 73	T33; 65	T26; 122	T4; 127	1st 460	T6; 90	3rd 172	T10; 76	T9; 83	T9; 77	3rd 438	2,226	24	1.7	
10	(Australia) M. W. Lee	CUT; 0	T18; 121	T5; 358	T41; 59	T31; 54	T2; 695	T13; 123	T35; 58	T14; 115	T15; 173	T4; 92	3rd 125	T7; 139						2,176	15	2.5	

Win
Top 10
Made cut
Missed cut
• Did not play

=== PGA Tour exemptions ===
The top 10 players on the Race to Dubai (not otherwise exempt) earned status to play on the 2024 PGA Tour. They were as follows:

- ~~Adrian Meronk (4th)~~ (Note: Meronk became ineligible for the 2024 PGA Tour season, having joined LIV Golf in January 2024.)
- Ryan Fox (5th)
- Victor Perez (7th)
- Thorbjørn Olesen (9th)
- Alexander Björk (11th)
- Sami Välimäki (12th)
- Robert MacIntyre (13th)
- Matthieu Pavon (15th)
- Jorge Campillo (16th)
- Ryo Hisatsune (17th)

== Awards ==
Award	Winner	Ref.
Player of the Year (Seve Ballesteros Award)	(Poland) Adrian Meronk	
Sir Henry Cotton Rookie of the Year	(Japan) Ryo Hisatsune	
Graduate of the Year	(New Zealand) Daniel Hillier	

== See also ==
- 2023 Challenge Tour
- 2023 European Senior Tour
