= 2024 European Tour =

Golf tour season

2024 European Tour season
- Duration: 23 November 2023 – 17 November 2024
- Number of official events: 44 (Note: One further tournament was removed from the schedule.)
- Most wins: (Northern Ireland) Rory McIlroy (2) (Note: Dean Burmester, Louis Oosthuizen and Xander Schauffele also won two events, but were not European Tour members.)
- Race to Dubai: (Northern Ireland) Rory McIlroy
- Player of the Year: (Northern Ireland) Rory McIlroy
- Sir Henry Cotton Rookie of the Year: (Sweden) Jesper Svensson

The 2024 European Tour, titled as the 2024 DP World Tour for sponsorship reasons, was the 53rd season of the European Tour, the main professional golf tour in Europe since its inaugural season in 1972.

It was the third season of the tour under a title sponsorship agreement with DP World that was announced in November 2021.

== Changes for 2024 ==
When the 2024 schedule was announced in August 2023, there were many changes from previous seasons, including:

- The calendar was split into three phases: the "Global Swings", the "Back 9" and the "DP World Tour Play-Offs".
  - There are five global swings: the "Opening Swing", the "International Swing", the "Asian Swing", the "European Swing" and the "Closing Swing". Each swing has its own mini Order of Merit, with the champion of each winning US$200,000. The swings also serve as a qualification route for the Rolex Series and Back 9 events.
  - The Back 9 consists of nine events in Europe, including several national opens and beginning with the Betfred British Masters.
  - The season-ending "DP World Tour Playoffs" consists of two events: the Abu Dhabi HSBC Championship and the DP World Tour Championship. The top 70 in the Race to Dubai Rankings qualify for the playoffs, with the top 50 in the rankings after the first event qualifying for the Tour Championship.
- Two new tournaments were added to the calendar for 2024: the Dubai Invitational and the Bahrain Championship. The Volvo China Open also returned to the schedule, having not been played on the European Tour since 2019 due to restrictions in place during the COVID-19 pandemic.
- Several tournaments held in 2023 were not included in the initial announcement: the WGC-Dell Technologies Match Play, the Thailand Classic, the Hero Indian Open, the ISPS Handa World Invitational, the Commercial Bank Qatar Masters and the Barbasol Championship, for which a replacement event was to be announced at a later date. Additionally, a change of dates for the Nedbank Golf Challenge meant it would not be part of the 2024 season, but was scheduled to return as one of the opening events of the 2025 season. The Hero Indian Open and the Commercial Bank Qatar Masters were later added to the schedule.
- In April 2024, the tour announced that Genesis Motor had become a title partner of the tour. As part of this deal, the Korea Championship, which had been played in 2023 and was due to be played in April 2024, was merged into the Genesis Championship, a long-standing Korean Tour event, which became a "Back 9" event played in October.
- Race to Dubai points were simplified, with regular tournaments during the swings all awarding 3,000 points and Back 9 events awarding 5,000 points. Points available in Rolex Series events, major championships and the tour championship all remained the same, at 8,000, 10,000 and 12,000 respectively.

== Schedule ==
The following table lists official events during the 2024 season.

Date	Tournament	Host country	Purse (US$)	R2D points	Winner (Note: The number in brackets after each winner's name is the number of European Tour events they had won up to and including that tournament. This information is only shown for European Tour members.)	OWGR points	Other tours (Note: AFR − Sunshine Tour; ANZ − PGA Tour of Australasia; CHN − China Tour; JPN − Japan Golf Tour; KOR − Korean Tour; LET − Ladies European Tour; PGAT − PGA Tour; PGTI − Professional Golf Tour of India.)	Notes
26 Nov	Fortinet Australian PGA Championship	Australia	A$2,000,000	3,000	(Australia) Min Woo Lee (3)	13.51	ANZ	
26 Nov	Joburg Open	South Africa	R20,500,000	3,000	(South Africa) Dean Burmester (3)	11.95	AFR	
3 Dec	ISPS Handa Australian Open	Australia	A$1,700,000	3,000	(Chile) Joaquín Niemann (1)	14.80	ANZ	
3 Dec	Investec South African Open Championship	South Africa	1,500,000	3,000	(South Africa) Dean Burmester (4)	12.59	AFR	
11 Dec	Alfred Dunhill Championship	South Africa	€1,500,000	3,000	(South Africa) Louis Oosthuizen (10)	14.07	AFR	
17 Dec	AfrAsia Bank Mauritius Open	Mauritius	1,200,000	3,000	(South Africa) Louis Oosthuizen (11)	11.05	AFR	
14 Jan	Dubai Invitational	UAE	2,500,000	3,000	(England) Tommy Fleetwood (7)	20.13		New limited-field pro-am
21 Jan	Hero Dubai Desert Classic	UAE	9,000,000	8,000	(Northern Ireland) Rory McIlroy (17)	29.73		Rolex Series
28 Jan	Ras Al Khaimah Championship	UAE	2,500,000	3,000	(Denmark) Thorbjørn Olesen (8)	18.70		
4 Feb	Bahrain Championship	Bahrain	2,500,000	3,000	(South Africa) Dylan Frittelli (3)	17.70		New tournament
11 Feb	Commercial Bank Qatar Masters	Qatar	2,500,000	3,000	(Japan) Rikuya Hoshino (1)	17.34		
25 Feb	Magical Kenya Open	Kenya	2,500,000	3,000	(Netherlands) Darius van Driel (1)	12.27		
3 Mar	SDC Championship	South Africa	1,500,000	3,000	(United States) Jordan Gumberg (1)	13.81	AFR	
10 Mar	Jonsson Workwear Open	South Africa	1,500,000	3,000	(Italy) Matteo Manassero (5)	13.99	AFR	
24 Mar	Porsche Singapore Classic	Singapore	2,500,000	3,000	(Sweden) Jesper Svensson (1)	19.32		
31 Mar	Hero Indian Open	India	2,250,000	3,000	(Japan) Keita Nakajima (1)	15.83	PGTI	
14 Apr	Masters Tournament	United States	20,000,000	10,000	(United States) Scottie Scheffler (n/a)	100		Major championship
~~21 Apr~~	Korea Championship	South Korea	–	–	Removed (Note: In April 2024, the Korea Championship was merged with the Genesis Championship, which was added to the tour schedule.)	–	KOR	
28 Apr	ISPS Handa Championship	Japan	2,250,000	3,000	(Japan) Yuto Katsuragawa (1)	20.72	JPN	
5 May	Volvo China Open	China	2,250,000	3,000	(Spain) Adrián Otaegui (5)	14.59	CHN	
19 May	PGA Championship	United States	18,500,000	10,000	(United States) Xander Schauffele (3)	100		Major championship
26 May	Soudal Open	Belgium	2,500,000	3,000	(Spain) Nacho Elvira (2)	18.19		
2 Jun	European Open	Germany	2,500,000	3,000	(England) Laurie Canter (1)	19.59		
9 Jun	Volvo Car Scandinavian Mixed	Sweden	2,000,000	3,000	(Sweden) Linn Grant (n/a)	14.45 (Note: OWGR points at the Volvo Car Scandinavian Mixed were awarded based on men's scores only. Calum Hill and Sebastian Söderberg tied for the lowest men's score and split the assigned points for first and second places, each earning 11.41 points.)	LET	Mixed event (Note: Field of 78 men and 78 women playing from different sets of tees. Tour ranking and world ranking points based on finish among men's field only.)
16 Jun	U.S. Open	United States	21,500,000	10,000	(United States) Bryson DeChambeau (3)	100		Major championship
23 Jun	KLM Open	Netherlands	2,500,000	3,000	(Italy) Guido Migliozzi (4)	18.05		
30 Jun	Italian Open	Italy	3,250,000	3,000	(Germany) Marcel Siem (6)	19.14		
7 Jul	BMW International Open	Germany	2,500,000	3,000	(Scotland) Ewen Ferguson (3)	19.81		
14 Jul	Genesis Scottish Open	Scotland	9,000,000	8,000	(Scotland) Robert MacIntyre (3)	65.37	PGAT	Rolex Series
14 Jul	ISCO Championship	United States	4,000,000	3,000	(England) Harry Hall (1)	25.13	PGAT	
21 Jul	The Open Championship	Scotland	17,000,000	10,000	(United States) Xander Schauffele (4)	100		Major championship
21 Jul	Barracuda Championship	United States	4,000,000	3,000	(United States) Nick Dunlap (n/a)	27.34	PGAT	
18 Aug	D+D Real Czech Masters	Czech Republic	2,500,000	3,000	(France) David Ravetto (1)	17.07		
25 Aug	Danish Golf Championship	Denmark	2,500,000	3,000	(France) Frédéric Lacroix (1)	16.67		
1 Sep	Betfred British Masters	England	3,500,000	5,000	(Denmark) Niklas Nørgaard (1)	22.52		
8 Sep	Omega European Masters	Switzerland	3,250,000	5,000	(England) Matt Wallace (5)	21.56		
15 Sep	Amgen Irish Open	Northern Ireland	6,000,000	5,000	(Denmark) Rasmus Højgaard (5)	28.64		
22 Sep	BMW PGA Championship	England	9,000,000	8,000	(United States) Billy Horschel (3)	33.98		Rolex Series
29 Sep	Acciona Open de España	Spain	3,250,000	5,000	(Spain) Ángel Hidalgo (1)	25.06		
6 Oct	Alfred Dunhill Links Championship	Scotland	5,000,000	5,000	(England) Tyrrell Hatton (7)	37.89		Pro-Am
13 Oct	FedEx Open de France	France	3,250,000	5,000	(England) Dan Bradbury (2)	22.48		
20 Oct	Estrella Damm N.A. Andalucía Masters	Spain	3,250,000	5,000	(France) Julien Guerrier (1)	23.73		
27 Oct	Genesis Championship	South Korea	4,000,000	5,000	(South Korea) An Byeong-hun (2)	15.55	KOR	New to European Tour
10 Nov	Abu Dhabi HSBC Championship	UAE	9,000,000	9,000	(England) Paul Waring (2)	30.82		Playoff event (Note: Also a Rolex Series tournament.)
17 Nov	DP World Tour Championship	UAE	10,000,000	12,000	(Northern Ireland) Rory McIlroy (18)	26.71		Playoff event

=== Unofficial events ===
The following events were sanctioned by the European Tour, but did not carry official money, nor were wins official.

Date	Tournament	Host country	Purse	Winner	OWGR points	Notes
4 Aug	Olympic Games	France	n/a	(United States) Scottie Scheffler	51.14	Limited-field event

== Race to Dubai ==
=== Points distribution ===
The distribution of Race to Dubai points for 2024 European Tour events were as follows:

Finishing position	Total pts	1st	2nd	3rd	4th	5th	6th	7th	8th	9th	10th	20th	30th	40th	50th	60th
Major championships	10,000	1,665	1,113	627	500	424	350	300	250	223	200	120	90	68	48	30
Rolex Series	8,000	1,335	889	500	400	339	280	240	200	178	160	96	72	54	38	24
Back 9 tournaments	5,000	835	555	312	250	212	176	150	125	112	100	60	45	34	24	15
Other European Tour events	3,000	500	334	188	150	127	105	90	75	67	60	36	27	20	14	9
Abu Dhabi HSBC Championship	9,000	1,500	1,000	565	450	381	315	270	225	201	180	108	81	61	43	27
DP World Tour Championship	12,000	2,000	1,335	752	600	509	420	359	300	267	240	144	108	82	58	36

=== Final standings ===
The Race to Dubai was based on tournament results during the season, calculated using a points-based system.

Pos.	Player	Majors				Rolex Series					Top 10s in other ET events							Total pts	Tmts	Money (Note: In addition to tournament prize money, the top 10 point scorers receive a share of a $6m bonus pool.)	
Pos.	Player	Mas	PGA	USO	Opn	Dub	Sco	BMW PGA	Abu	DPW TC	1	2	3	4	5	6	7	Total pts	Tmts	Reg. (€m)	Bon. ($m)
1	(Northern Ireland) McIlroy	T22; 104	T12; 152	2nd 1113	CUT; 0	1st 1335	T4; 273	T2; 695	T3; 465	1st 2000	T2; 261	2nd 555						6,998	12	9.17	2.00
2	(Denmark) R. Højgaard	•	T68; 21	•	T60; 30	T11; 142	T21; 89	T38; 57	T32; 72	2nd 1335	2nd 334	T8; 64	T6; 90	T4; 139	3rd 312	1st 835	T4; 231	4,019	23	3.53	1.00
3	(South Africa) Lawrence	•	CUT; 0	•	4th 500	CUT; 0	CUT; 0	T2; 695	T6; 253	T30; 103	T7; 83	T10; 58	T2; 261	T2; 224	T2; 261	2nd 555		3,316	26	2.92	0.75
4	(England) Hatton	T9; 202	T63; 25	T26; 96	CUT; 0	T31; 66	•	•	2nd 1000	6th 420	T10; 93	1st 835						2,797	10	2.80	0.55
5	(England) Waring	•	•	•	•	T41; 47	•	T45; 45	1st 1500	T16; 162	T6; 90	T3; 155	T10; 55	T6; 84	T7; 116			2,630	27	2.22	0.45
6	(United States) Horschel	•	T8; 214	T41; 61	T2; 870	•	CUT; 0	1st 1335	•	T47; 65								2,545	8	3.28	0.35
7	(England) Fleetwood	T3; 517	T26; 90	T16; 135	CUT; 0	T14; 126	T34; 61	T12; 121	T6; 253	T16; 162	1st 500	T9; 204	3rd 312					2,481	12	2.78	0.30
8	(Australia) A. Scott	T22; 104	CUT; 0	T32; 78	T10; 185	T7; 195	2nd 889	T57; 25	T46; 46	T3; 620	6th 105	T4; 127						2,374	11	2.35	0.25
9	(Scotland) MacIntyre	•	T8; 214	CUT; 0	T50; 43	•	1st 1335	T12; 121	T19; 107	T7; 292	T5; 194							2,373	11	2.66	0.20
10	(Sweden) Svensson	•	T53; 36	•	CUT; 0	T31; 66	T34; 61	CUT; 0	T44; 53	T7; 292	T2; 224	T2; 261	1st 500	2nd 334	5th 212			2,322	28	1.66	0.15

Win
Top 10
Made cut
Missed cut
• Did not play

=== PGA Tour exemptions ===
The top 10 players on the Race to Dubai (not otherwise exempt) earned status to play on the 2025 PGA Tour. They were as follows:

- Rasmus Højgaard (2nd)
- Thriston Lawrence (3rd)
- Paul Waring (5th)
- Jesper Svensson (10th)
- Niklas Nørgaard (11th)
- Matteo Manassero (12th)
- Thorbjørn Olesen (13th)
- Antoine Rozner (15th)
- Rikuya Hoshino (16th)
- ~~Tom McKibbin (18th)~~ (Note: McKibbin became ineligible for the 2025 PGA Tour season, having joined LIV Golf in January 2025.)

== Awards ==
Award	Winner	Ref.
Player of the Year (Seve Ballesteros Award)	(Northern Ireland) Rory McIlroy	
Sir Henry Cotton Rookie of the Year	(Sweden) Jesper Svensson	

== See also ==
- 2024 Challenge Tour
- 2024 European Senior Tour
