= Andalucía Masters =

Golf tournament

Coordinates: 41.571°N 2.055°E

Estrella Damm N.A. Andalucía Masters

Tournament information
- Location: Sotogrande, Spain
- Established: 2010
- Course: Real Club de Golf Sotogrande
- Par: 72
- Length: 7,200 yards (6,600 m)
- Tour: European Tour
- Format: Stroke play
- Prize fund: US$3,750,000
- Month played: October

Tournament record score
- Aggregate: 265 Adrián Otaegui (2022)
- To par: −21 Jorge Campillo (2024) −21 Julien Guerrier (2024)

Current champion
- (France) Julien Guerrier

Final champion
- Location in Spain Location in Andalusia

The Andalucía Masters is a golf tournament on the European Tour. It was first played in 2010 at the Valderrama Golf Club in Sotogrande, Spain. It was played at the same location as the former Volvo Masters. The 2012 edition was cancelled, only a month before the event was due to start, as the new local government wished to cut costs. The event did not return until 2017, when it was hosted by 2011 champion Sergio García, who had hosted the Open de España at the same venue in 2016.

In 2019, the event was added to the Open Qualifying Series, giving up to three non-exempt players entry into The Open Championship.

The 2022 event was the final edition of the tournament to be held at Valderrama due to LIV Golf acquiring it as a venue for the 2023 LIV Golf League. Having signed a five-year deal with LIV Golf, Valderrama was removed by the European Tour as one of their venues. In July 2023, it was announced that Real Club de Golf Sotogrande would be the new host venue for the Andalucía Masters.

== Winners ==
Year	Winner	Score	To par	Margin of victory	Runner(s)-up	Ref.
Estrella Damm N.A. Andalucía Masters
2024	(France) Julien Guerrier	267	−21	Playoff	(Spain) Jorge Campillo	
2023	(Poland) Adrian Meronk	272	−16	1 stroke	(Germany) Matti Schmid	
2022	(Spain) Adrián Otaegui	265	−19	6 strokes	(Sweden) Joakim Lagergren	
2021	(England) Matt Fitzpatrick	278	−6	3 strokes	(Australia) Min Woo Lee (Sweden) Sebastian Söderberg	
2020	(United States) John Catlin	286	+2	1 stroke	(Germany) Martin Kaymer	
2019	(South Africa) Christiaan Bezuidenhout	274	−10	6 strokes	(Spain) Adri Arnaus (Spain) Eduardo de la Riva (France) Mike Lorenzo-Vera (Spain) Álvaro Quirós (Spain) Jon Rahm	
Andalucía Valderrama Masters
2018	(Spain) Sergio García (3)	201 (Note: Shortened to 54 holes due to weather.)	−12	4 strokes	(Republic of Ireland) Shane Lowry	
2017	(Spain) Sergio García (2)	272	−12	1 stroke	(Netherlands) Joost Luiten	
Andalucía Masters
2013–2016: No tournament
2012	Cancelled due to lack of funding					
2011	(Spain) Sergio García	278	−6	1 stroke	(Spain) Miguel Ángel Jiménez	
Andalucía Valderrama Masters
2010	(Northern Ireland) Graeme McDowell	281	−3	2 strokes	(Denmark) Søren Kjeldsen (Northern Ireland) Gareth Maybin (Republic of Ireland) Damien McGrane	
