= 2026 European Tour =

Golf tour season

2026 European Tour season
- Duration: 27 November 2025 – 15 November 2026
- Number of official events: 42
- Most wins: (Spain) Eugenio Chacarra (3)
- Race to Dubai: (Northern Ireland) Rory Mcilroy
- Sir Henry Cotton Rookie of the Year: (Japan) Kota Kaneko

The 2026 European Tour, titled as the 2026 DP World Tour for sponsorship reasons, was the 55th season of the European Tour, the main professional golf tour in Europe since its inaugural season in 1972.

It was the fifth season of the tour under a title sponsorship agreement with DP World that was announced in November 2021.

== Changes for 2026 ==
The full schedule was announced in September 2025. As part of the announcement, it was revealed that a new event, the Estrella Damm Catalunya Championship, would be added to the schedule, alongside the confirmation that Trump International, Doonbeg would host the 2026 Amgen Irish Open. Several tournaments held in 2025 were not included in the schedule announcement: the Ras Al Khaimah Championship, the Porsche Singapore Classic, the Barracuda Championship (which was also not announced as part of the 2026 PGA Tour schedule) and the Nexo Championship.

== Schedule ==
The following table lists official events during the 2026 season.

Date	Tournament	Host country	Purse (US$)	R2D points	Winner (Note: The number in brackets after each winner's name is the number of European Tour events they had won up to and including that tournament. This information is only shown for European Tour members.)	OWGR points	Other tours (Note: AFR − Sunshine Tour; ANZ − PGA Tour of Australasia; CHN − China Tour; KOR − Korean Tour; PGAT − PGA Tour; PGTI − Professional Golf Tour of India.)	Notes
30 Nov	BMW Australian PGA Championship	Australia	A$2,500,000	3,000	(Spain) David Puig (1)	16.42	ANZ	
7 Dec	Crown Australian Open	Australia	A$2,000,000	3,000	(Denmark) Rasmus Neergaard-Petersen (1)	20.70	ANZ	
7 Dec	Nedbank Golf Challenge	South Africa	6,000,000	4,000	(Norway) Kristoffer Reitan (2)	21.01	AFR	Limited-field event
14 Dec	Alfred Dunhill Championship	South Africa	€1,500,000	3,000	(South Africa) Jayden Schaper (1)	16.86	AFR	
21 Dec	AfrAsia Bank Mauritius Open	Mauritius	1,200,000	3,000	(South Africa) Jayden Schaper (2)	14.21	AFR	
18 Jan	Dubai Invitational	UAE	2,750,000	3,500	(Spain) Nacho Elvira (3)	22.91		
25 Jan	Hero Dubai Desert Classic	UAE	9,000,000	8,000	(United States) Patrick Reed (4)	30.86		Rolex Series
1 Feb	Bapco Energies Bahrain Championship	Bahrain	2,750,000	3,500	(Germany) Freddy Schott (1)	20.95		
8 Feb	Qatar Masters	Qatar	2,750,000	3,500	(United States) Patrick Reed (5)	20.83		
22 Feb	Magical Kenya Open	Kenya	2,700,000	3,500	(South Africa) Casey Jarvis (1)	15.96		
1 Mar	Investec South African Open Championship	South Africa	1,500,000	3,000	(South Africa) Casey Jarvis (2)	19.17	AFR	
8 Mar	Joburg Open	South Africa	R20,500,000	3,000	(England) Dan Bradbury (3)	16.65	AFR	
22 Mar	Hainan Classic	China	2,550,000	3,500	(United States) Jordan Gumberg (2)	12.74	CHN	
29 Mar	Hero Indian Open	India	2,550,000	3,500	(England) Alex Fitzpatrick (1)	17.02	PGTI	
12 Apr	Masters Tournament	United States	22,500,000	10,000	(Northern Ireland) Rory McIlroy (21)	100		Major championship
26 Apr	Volvo China Open	China	2,750,000	3,500	(Austria) Bernd Wiesberger (9)	14.85	CHN	
3 May	Turkish Airlines Open	Turkey	2,750,000	3,500	(Sweden) Mikael Lindberg (1)	22.16		
10 May	Estrella Damm Catalunya Championship	Spain	2,750,000	3,500	(South Africa) Yurav Premlall (1)	20.00		New tournament
17 May	PGA Championship	United States	20,500,000	10,000	(England) Aaron Rai (4)	100		Major championship
24 May	Soudal Open	Belgium	2,750,000	3,500	(South Africa) Richard Sterne (7)	21.34		
31 May	Austrian Alpine Open	Austria	2,750,000	3,500	(Japan) Kota Kaneko (1)	20.04		
7 Jun	KLM Open	Netherlands	2,750,000	3,500	(Spain) Eugenio Chacarra (2)	20.21		
21 Jun	U.S. Open	United States	22,500,000	10,000	(United States) Wyndham Clark (n/a)	100		Major championship
28 Jun	DS Automobiles Open d'Italia	Italy	3,000,000	3,500	(Spain) Eugenio Chacarra (3)	24.12		
5 Jul	BMW International Open	Germany	3,000,000	3,500	(South Africa) Michael Hollick (1)	24.97		
12 Jul	Genesis Scottish Open	Scotland	9,000,000	8,000	(South Korea) Tom Kim (1)	70.04	PGAT	Rolex Series
12 Jul	ISCO Championship	United States	4,000,000	3,500	(United States) Steven Fisk (n/a)	23.30	PGAT	
19 Jul	The Open Championship	England	17,750,000	10,000	(New Zealand) Ryan Fox (5)	100		Major championship
19 Jul	Corales Puntacana Championship	Dominican Republic	4,000,000	3,500	(Italy) Stefano Mazzoli (1)	20.96	PGAT	New to European Tour
16 Aug	Danish Golf Championship	Denmark	3,000,000	3,500	(Denmark) Jeff Winther (2)	17.49		
23 Aug	Nexo Championship	Scotland	3,000,000	3,500	(Scotland) Scott Jamieson (2)	14.68		
30 Aug	Husqvarna British Masters	England	3,500,000	5,000	(England) Joe Dean (1)	24.50		
6 Sep	Omega European Masters	Switzerland	3,750,000	5,000	(South Africa) Thriston Lawrence (6)	23.61		
13 Sep	Amgen Irish Open	Ireland	6,000,000	5,000	(Republic of Ireland) Shane Lowry (7)	32.75		
20 Sep	BMW PGA Championship	England	9,000,000	8,000	(United States) J. J. Spaun (n/a)	43.85		Rolex Series
27 Sep	FedEx Open de France	France	3,750,000	5,000	(England) Matt Fitzpatrick (11)	25.42		
4 Oct	Alfred Dunhill Links Championship	Scotland	5,000,000	5,000	(Poland) Adrian Meronk (5)	29.88		
11 Oct	Open de España	Spain	3,750,000	5,000	(Scotland) Grant Forrest (3)	27.01		
18 Oct	DP World India Championship	India	4,000,000	5,000	(Spain) Eugenio Chacarra (4)	26.47	PGTI	
25 Oct	Genesis Championship	South Korea	4,000,000	5,000	(Japan) Yuto Katsuragawa (2)	17.50	KOR	
8 Nov	Abu Dhabi Aldar Championship	UAE	9,000,000	9,000	(Spain) Jon Rahm (11)	26.99		Playoff event (Note: Also a Rolex Series tournament.)
15 Nov	DP World Tour Championship	UAE	10,000,000	12,000	(England) Tyrrell Hatton (9)	23.96		Playoff event

== Race to Dubai ==
=== Points distribution ===
The distribution of Race to Dubai points for 2026 European Tour events were as follows:

Finishing position	Total pts	1st	2nd	3rd	4th	5th	6th	7th	8th	9th	10th	20th	30th	40th	50th	60th
Major championships	10,000	1,665	1,113	627	500	424	350	300	250	223	200	120	90	68	48	30
Rolex Series	8,000	1,335	889	500	400	339	280	240	200	178	160	96	72	54	38	24
Back 9 tournaments	5,000	835	555	312	250	212	176	150	125	112	100	60	45	34	24	15
Nedbank Golf Challenge	4,000	665	445	251	200	170	140	120	100	90	80	48	36	27	19	12
Regular tournaments (Note: Tournaments with purses of $2,000,000 and above.)	3,500	585	389	219	175	148	122	105	87	78	70	42	32	24	17	11
Other regular tournaments (Note: Tournaments with purses below $2,000,000.)	3,000	500	334	188	150	127	105	90	75	67	60	36	27	20	14	9
Abu Dhabi HSBC Championship	9,000	1,500	1,000	565	450	381	315	270	225	201	180	108	81	61	43	27
DP World Tour Championship	12,000	2,000	1,335	752	600	509	420	359	300	267	240	144	108	82	58	36

=== Final standings ===
The Race to Dubai was based on tournament results during the season, calculated using a points-based system.

Pos.	Player	Majors				Rolex Series					Top 10s in other ET events										Total pts	Tmts	Money (Note: In addition to tournament prize money, the top 10 point scorers received a share of a $6m bonus pool.)	
Pos.	Player	Mas	PGA	USO	Opn	Dub	Sco	BMW PGA	Abu	DPW TC	1	2	3	4	5	6	7	8	9	10	Total pts	Tmts	Reg. (€m)	Bon. ($m)
1	(Northern Ireland) McIlroy	1st 1665	T7; 258	T32; 78	T40; 63	T33; 60	T7; 220	T2; 532	3rd 565	2nd 1335	T3; 166										5,045	13	7.22	2.00
2	(Spain) Chacarra	•	•	•	T46; 50	CUT; 0	T52; 30	T21; 88	T22; 100	T3; 676	3rd 188	2nd 389	3rd 188	T10; 65	1st 585	1st 585	T4; 183	T3; 237	T2; 434	1st 835	4,920	31	3.57	1.00
3	(England) Hatton	T3; 475	CUT; 0	T7; 243	T69; 21	T33; 60	T17; 101	T27; 70	2nd 1000	1st 2000											3,997	13	5.34	0.75
4	(United States) Reed	T12; 152	T10; 179	CUT; 0	T46; 50	1st 1335	T13; 120	WD; 0	T43; 54	T31; 99	T2; 304	1st 585	T10; 58	T2; 434							3,627	22	3.62	0.55
5	(South Africa) Jarvis	CUT; 0	T65; 23	•	T6; 300	T56; 26	T21; 89	CUT; 0	T51; 37	T47; 64	3rd 188	T9; 68	1st 585	1st 500	T2; 261	T2; 434	T4; 161				2,957	28	2.13	0.45
6	(Spain) Rahm (Note: Rahm was not a European Tour member during the Masters Tournament. Points he earned in that event did not count towards his Race to Dubai ranking.)	T38; ~~70~~	T2; 870	CUT; 0	T46; 50	•	T36; 55	CUT; 0	1st 1500	T19; 140											2,666	9	3.24	0.35
7	(England) Rai	48th 52	1st 1665	T11; 160	CUT; 0	•	CUT; 0	T2; 532	T25; 93	T36; 89											2,649	9	4.28	0.30
8	(South Africa) Schaper	•	CUT; 0	CUT; 0	CUT; 0	T4; 340	CUT; 0	T36; 59	8th 225	T19; 140	T2; 348	1st 500	1st 500	T9; 66							2,586	27	1.86	0.25
9	(New Zealand) Fox	CUT; 0	T35; 70	T23; 99	1st 1665	T45; 44	T30; 67	T6; 225	•	T31; 99	T4; 161										2,526	13	3.58	0.20
10	(New Zealand) Hillier	•	T26; 90	•	CUT; 0	T26; 74	CUT; 0	T36; 59	T22; 100	T19; 140	T5; 116	T6; 98	2nd 389	T4; 162	T7; 85	T2; 332	2nd 555				2,492	25	1.73	0.15

Win
Top 10
Made cut
Missed cut
Withdrew
• Did not play

=== PGA Tour exemptions ===
The top 10 players on the Race to Dubai (not otherwise exempt) earned status to play on the 2027 PGA Tour. They were as follows:

- Eugenio Chacarra (2nd)
- Patrick Reed (4th)
- Casey Jarvis (5th)
- Jayden Schaper (8th)
- Daniel Hillier (10th)
- Jacob Skov Olesen (11th)
- Oliver Lindell (12th)
- Andy Sullivan (13th)
- Bernd Wiesberger (14th)
- Joe Dean (16th)

== Awards ==
Award	Winner	Ref.
Player of the Year (Seve Ballesteros Award)		
Sir Henry Cotton Rookie of the Year	(Japan) Kota Kaneko	

== See also ==
- 2026 Challenge Tour
- 2026 European Senior Tour
