= Korea Championship (European Tour) =

Professional golf tournament

Coordinates: 37.380°N 126.624°E

Tournament information
- Location: Incheon, South Korea
- Established: 2023
- Course: Jack Nicklaus Golf Club Korea
- Par: 72
- Length: 7,470 yards (6,830 m)
- Tours: European Tour; Korean Tour
- Format: Stroke play
- Prize fund: US$2,000,000
- Month played: April
- Final year: 2023

Tournament record score
- Aggregate: 276 Pablo Larrazábal (2023)
- To par: −12 as above

Final champion
- (Spain) Pablo Larrazábal

Location map
- Location in South Korea

The Korea Championship was a professional golf tournament held at Jack Nicklaus Golf Club Korea in Incheon, South Korea.

== History ==
The tournament was created in 2023 and was a co-sanctioned event between the European Tour and the Korean Tour.

Genesis Motor was also announced as the presenting sponsor for the inaugural event.

Pablo Larrazábal won the inaugural event, winning by two shots ahead of Marcus Helligkilde.

The tournament was scheduled to return in 2024, again as a co-sanctioned European Tour and Korean Tour event. However, in April 2024, the European Tour announced that the event would be merged with the Genesis Championship, ultimately being removed from the 2024 schedule.

== Winners ==
Year	Tours (Note: EUR − European Tour; KOR − Korean Tour.)	Winner	Score	To par	Margin of victory	Runner-up
2024	EUR, KOR	Removed from the schedule				
2023	EUR, KOR	(Spain) Pablo Larrazábal	276	−12	2 strokes	(Denmark) Marcus Helligkilde
