= Dan Bradbury =

English professional golfer

Personal information
- Full name: Daniel John Bradbury
- Nationality: England
- Born: 26 July 1999 (age 27) Wakefield, England
- Height: 6 ft 2 in (188 cm)

Career
- Sport: Golf
- College: Lincoln Memorial University; Florida State University
- Turned professional: 2022
- Current tour: European Tour
- Professional wins: 3

Number of wins by tour
- European Tour: 3
- Sunshine Tour: 2

Best results in major championships
- Masters Tournament: DNP
- PGA Championship: DNP
- U.S. Open: DNP
- The Open Championship: CUT: 2023, 2024, 2026

Daniel John Bradbury (born 26 July 1999) is an English professional golfer who plays on the European Tour. He claimed his first win as a professional in his third European Tour start at the 2022 Joburg Open.

== Amateur career ==
Bradbury attended Lincoln Memorial University from 2017 to 2021, where he was the 2020 and 2021 South Atlantic Conference Men's Athlete of the Year. He played his final collegiate season at Florida State University in 2022.

== Professional career ==
Bradbury turned professional in July 2022 and made his first start at the Cazoo Classic, played at Hillside Golf Club in Southport. He missed the cut. In November 2022, in his third start on the European Tour and playing on a sponsor's invite, Bradbury won the Joburg Open, an event also co-sanctioned by the Sunshine Tour. He shot a final score of 263 (21 under par) to win by three shots ahead of Sami Välimäki. The win also gained him an exemption into the 2023 Open Championship.

== Amateur wins ==
- 2018 Tennessee River Rumble, Myrtle Beach Intercollegiate
- 2019 Bearcat Golf Classic, State Farm Intercollegiate, Men's South Region Preview
- 2020 Battle at Hilton Head
- 2021 Bearcat Golf Classic, Argonaut Invitational, SAC Championship

== Professional wins (3) ==
=== European Tour wins (3) ===
No.	Date	Tournament	Winning score	Margin of victory	Runner(s)-up
1	27 Nov 2022 (2023 season)	Joburg Open^{1}	−21 (63-66-67-67=263)	3 strokes	(Finland) Sami Välimäki
2	13 Oct 2024	FedEx Open de France	−16 (67-66-69-66=268)	1 stroke	(England) Sam Bairstow, (Denmark) Thorbjørn Olesen, (Germany) Yannik Paul, (Denmark) Jeff Winther
3	8 Mar 2026	Joburg Open^{1} (2)	−17 (64-70-64-65=263)	1 stroke	(South Africa) Casey Jarvis, (England) Brandon Robinson-Thompson

^{1}Co-sanctioned by the Sunshine Tour

== Results in major championships ==
Tournament	2023	2024	2025	2026
Masters Tournament				
PGA Championship				
U.S. Open				
The Open Championship	CUT	CUT		CUT

Did not play

CUT = missed the half-way cut
