= Golf at the 2024 Summer Olympics – Men's individual =

Men's golf at the Games of the XXXIII Olympiad
- Olympic Golf
- Venue: Le Golf National (Albatros Course)
- Dates: 1–4 August 2024
- Competitors: 60 from 32 nations
- Winning score: 265 (−19)

Medalists
1st place, gold medalist(s)		Scottie Scheffler	United States
2nd place, silver medalist(s)		Tommy Fleetwood	Great Britain
3rd place, bronze medalist(s)		Hideki Matsuyama	Japan

The men's individual golf event at the 2024 Summer Olympics took place from 1 to 4 August 2024 at Le Golf National. 60 golfers from 33 nations were competing.

== Qualification ==
Each country could qualify from one to four golfers based on the World Rankings of 17 June 2024. The top 60 golfers, subject to limits per nation and guarantees for the host and continental representation, were selected. A nation could have three or four golfers if they are all in the top 15 of the rankings; otherwise, each nation was limited to two golfers. One spot was guaranteed for the host nation France and five spots were guaranteed to ensure that each Olympic continent has at least one representative.

== Competition format and schedule ==
As with most major stroke play tournaments, the event was held over four days (Thursday through Sunday) with each golfer playing one round (18 holes) per day. However, unlike most tour events, there is no cut to the field after day two, with all players playing all four rounds.

All times are Central European Summer Time (UTC+2)

Date	Time	Round
Thursday, 1 August 2024	9:00	First round
Friday, 2 August 2024	9:00	Second round
Saturday, 3 August 2024	9:00	Third round
Sunday, 4 August 2024	9:00	Final round

== Results ==
=== First round ===
Thursday, 1 August 2024

Victor Perez, from the host country, hit the opening tee shot. Hideki Matsuyama (Japan), who lost in a 7-man playoff for the bronze medal at the 2020 Olympics, shot an 8-under-par round of 63 to lead by two strokes over defending champion Xander Schauffele (United States). Overnight rain had softened the course, resulting in lower-than-expected scores. Play was delayed twice during the round due to nearby lightning.

Rank	Player	Nation	Score	To par
1	Hideki Matsuyama	Japan	63	−8
2	Xander Schauffele	United States	65	−6
T3	Emiliano Grillo	Argentina	66	−5
T3	Tom Kim	South Korea	66	−5
T3	Joaquín Niemann	Chile	66	−5
T6	Tommy Fleetwood	Great Britain	67	−4
T6	Ryan Fox	New Zealand	67	−4
T6	Alex Norén	Sweden	67	−4
T6	Jon Rahm	Spain	67	−4
T6	Scottie Scheffler	United States	67	−4
T6	Sepp Straka	Austria	67	−4
T6	Sami Välimäki	Finland	67	−4
T6	Erik van Rooyen	South Africa	67	−4

=== Second round ===
Friday, 2 August 2024

Tommy Fleetwood (Great Britain), Xander Schauffele (United States), and first round leader Hideki Matsuyama (Japan) were tied for first place after the second round, sitting two strokes ahead of Jon Rahm (Spain). World Number one Scottie Scheffler (United States) was five strokes back.

Rank	Player	Nation	Score	To par
T1	Tommy Fleetwood	Great Britain	67-64=131	−11
T1	Hideki Matsuyama	Japan	63-68=131	−11
T1	Xander Schauffele	United States	65-66=131	−11
4	Jon Rahm	Spain	67-66=133	−9
T5	Thomas Detry	Belgium	71-63=134	−8
T5	Tom Kim	South Korea	66-68=134	−8
T5	Pan Cheng-tsung	Chinese Taipei	69-65=134	−8
T8	Stephan Jäger	Germany	71-64=135	−7
T8	Guido Migliozzi	Italy	68-67=135	−7
T10	Joaquín Niemann	Chile	66-70=136	−6
T10	Scottie Scheffler	United States	67-69=136	−6
T10	Erik van Rooyen	South Africa	67-69=136	−6

=== Third round ===
Saturday, 3 August 2024

Jon Rahm (Spain) moved into a tie for first place with Xander Schauffele (United States) with a 5-under-par 66. Second round co-leader Tommy Fleetwood (Great Britain) dropped to third place, one stroke behind. The other second round co-leader, Hideki Matsuyama (Japan), was two strokes off the lead and tied with Nicolai Højgaard (Denmark) who tied the course record with a 9-under-par 62. World number one Scottie Scheffler (United States) was four strokes behind the leaders.

Rank	Player	Nation	Score	To par
T1	Jon Rahm	Spain	67-66-66=199	−14
T1	Xander Schauffele	United States	65-66-68=199	−14
3	Tommy Fleetwood	Great Britain	67-64-69=200	−13
T4	Nicolai Højgaard	Denmark	70-70-62=202	−11
T4	Hideki Matsuyama	Japan	63-68-71=202	−11
T6	Thomas Detry	Belgium	71-63-69=203	−10
T6	Tom Kim	South Korea	66-68-69=203	−10
T6	Rory McIlroy	Ireland	68-69-66=203	−10
T6	Scottie Scheffler	United States	67-69-67=203	−10
T10	Ludvig Åberg	Sweden	68-70-66=204	−9
T10	Jason Day	Australia	69-68-67=204	−9
T10	Joaquín Niemann	Chile	66-70-68=204	−9

=== Final round ===
Sunday, 4 August 2024

American Scottie Scheffler tied the course record by shooting 62 (−9) to win the gold medal by one stroke. The world number one golfer started the day four strokes behind the leaders but birdied five of the last seven holes. Tommy Fleetwood of Great Britain won the silver medal and Hideki Matsuyama of Japan was one stroke behind for the bronze medal.

Rank	Player	Nation	Rd 1	Rd 2	Rd 3	Rd 4	Total	To par
1st place, gold medalist(s)	Scottie Scheffler	United States	67	69	67	62	265	−19
2nd place, silver medalist(s)	Tommy Fleetwood	Great Britain	67	64	69	66	266	−18
3rd place, bronze medalist(s)	Hideki Matsuyama	Japan	63	68	71	65	267	−17
4	Victor Perez	France	70	67	68	63	268	−16
T5	Rory McIlroy	Ireland	68	69	66	66	269	−15
T5	Jon Rahm	Spain	67	66	66	70	269	−15
7	Nicolai Højgaard	Denmark	70	70	62	68	270	−14
8	Tom Kim	South Korea	66	68	69	68	271	−13
T9	Corey Conners	Canada	68	69	69	66	272	−12
T9	Jason Day	Australia	69	68	67	68	272	−12
T9	Joaquín Niemann	Chile	66	70	68	68	272	−12
T9	Thomas Detry	Belgium	71	63	69	69	272	−12
T9	Xander Schauffele	United States	65	66	68	73	272	−12
T14	Wyndham Clark	United States	75	68	65	65	273	−11
T14	Thorbjørn Olesen	Denmark	71	68	66	68	273	−11
16	Christiaan Bezuidenhout	South Africa	70	71	64	69	274	−10
17	Erik van Rooyen	South Africa	67	69	69	70	275	−9
T18	Matteo Manassero	Italy	69	69	69	69	276	−8
T18	Alejandro Tosti	Argentina	68	69	69	70	276	−8
T18	Pan Cheng-tsung	Chinese Taipei	69	65	72	70	276	−8
T18	Ludvig Åberg	Sweden	68	70	66	72	276	−8
T22	Min Woo Lee	Australia	76	65	68	68	277	−7
T22	Guido Migliozzi	Italy	68	67	74	68	277	−7
T24	Collin Morikawa	United States	70	68	70	70	278	−6
T24	An Byeong-hun	South Korea	72	68	66	72	278	−6
T26	Matti Schmid	Germany	68	75	69	67	279	−5
T26	Carlos Ortiz	Mexico	68	70	70	71	279	−5
T26	Stephan Jäger	Germany	71	64	72	72	279	−5
T26	Shane Lowry	Ireland	71	71	66	71	279	−5
T30	Rafael Campos	Puerto Rico	73	70	70	67	280	−4
T30	Viktor Hovland	Norway	70	75	67	68	280	−4
T30	Nick Taylor	Canada	70	73	68	69	280	−4
T33	Gavin Green	Malaysia	74	69	69	69	281	−3
T33	Fabrizio Zanotti	Paraguay	70	69	71	71	281	−3
T35	Nico Echavarría	Colombia	74	69	71	68	282	−2
T35	Abraham Ancer	Mexico	70	71	71	70	282	−2
T35	Sepp Straka	Austria	67	74	70	71	282	−2
T35	Ryan Fox	New Zealand	67	73	68	74	282	−2
T35	Tapio Pulkkanen	Finland	69	72	71	70	282	−2
T40	Shubhankar Sharma	India	70	69	72	72	283	−1
T40	Adrien Dumont de Chassart	Belgium	70	70	70	73	283	−1
T40	David Puig	Spain	69	69	70	75	283	−1
T43	Kristoffer Ventura	Norway	71	68	76	69	284	E
T43	Emiliano Grillo	Argentina	66	75	75	68	284	E
T45	Mito Pereira	Chile	69	76	74	66	285	+1
T45	Gaganjeet Bhullar	India	75	69	71	70	285	+1
T45	Alex Norén	Sweden	67	74	71	73	285	+1
T45	Sami Välimäki	Finland	67	71	72	75	285	+1
T49	Keita Nakajima	Japan	70	70	73	74	287	+3
T49	Adrian Meronk	Poland	73	71	72	71	287	+3
T49	Joel Girrbach	Switzerland	69	72	70	76	287	+3
52	Kevin Yu	Chinese Taipei	73	69	72	74	288	+4
53	Dou Zecheng	China	69	70	77	73	289	+5
54	Kiradech Aphibarnrat	Thailand	74	73	72	71	290	+6
55	Daniel Hillier	New Zealand	75	73	70	73	291	+7
56	Yuan Yechun	China	70	72	78	72	292	+8
57	Camilo Villegas	Colombia	76	74	72	71	293	+9
58	Matthieu Pavon	France	71	75	77	74	297	+13
WD	Matt Fitzpatrick	Great Britain	73	64	81	DNF	218	DNF
WD	Phachara Khongwatmai	Thailand	70	75	74	DNF	219	DNF
