= 2025 FedEx Cup Playoffs =

Tournament information
- Dates: August 7–24, 2025
- Location: TPC Southwind; Caves Valley Golf Club; East Lake Golf Club
- Tour: PGA Tour

Statistics
- Field: 70 for FedEx St. Jude Ch. 50 for BMW Championship; 30 for Tour Championship
- Prize fund: $40,000,000 (Tour Championship)
- Winner's share: $10,000,000 (Tour Championship)

Champion
- (England) Tommy Fleetwood
- −18 (262)

The 2025 FedEx Cup Playoffs, the series of three golf tournaments that determined the 2025 season champion on the U.S.-based PGA Tour, was played from August 7–24. It included the following three events:

- FedEx St. Jude Championship – TPC Southwind, Memphis, Tennessee
- BMW Championship – Caves Valley Golf Club, Owings Mills, Maryland
- Tour Championship – East Lake Golf Club, Atlanta, Georgia

This was the 19th FedEx Cup playoffs since their inception in 2007.

The point distributions can be seen here.

== Regular season rankings ==
The leading 10 players in the FedEx Cup regular-season standings qualified for shares of the $40 million Comcast Business Tour Top 10 bonus and of $20 million in FedEx Cup bonus money.

| # | Player | Points | Events | Comcast Bonus ($) | FedEx Cup Bonus ($) |
|---|---|---|---|---|---|
| 1 | (United States) Scottie Scheffler | 4,806 | 16 | 8,000,000 | 10,000,000 |
| 2 | (Northern Ireland) Rory McIlroy | 3,444 | 14 | 6,000,000 | 4,000,000 |
| 3 | (Austria) Sepp Straka | 2,595 | 20 | 4,800,000 | 1,200,000 |
| 4 | (United States) Russell Henley | 2,391 | 15 | 4,400,000 | 1,000,000 |
| 5 | (United States) Justin Thomas | 2,280 | 17 | 4,000,000 | 800,000 |
| 6 | (United States) Ben Griffin | 2,275 | 25 | 3,400,000 | 700,000 |
| 7 | (United States) Harris English | 2,232 | 18 | 2,800,000 | 650,000 |
| 8 | (United States) J. J. Spaun | 2,144 | 20 | 2,400,000 | 600,000 |
| 9 | (England) Tommy Fleetwood | 1,783 | 16 | 2,200,000 | 550,000 |
| 10 | (United States) Keegan Bradley | 1,749 | 18 | 2,000,000 | 500,000 |

== Playoff tournaments ==
=== FedEx St. Jude Championship ===
The FedEx St. Jude Championship was played August 7–10; 70 players were eligible, and there was no second-round cut. All eligible players competed except Rory McIlroy.

| | | | | | FedEx Cup rank | |
| Place | Player | Score | To par | Winnings ($) | Before | After |
|---|---|---|---|---|---|---|
| 1 | (England) Justin Rose | 64-66-67-67=264 | −16 | 3,600,000 | 25 | 4 |
| 2 | (United States) J. J. Spaun | 68-66-65-65=264 | −16 | 2,160,000 | 8 | 3 |
| T3 | (England) Tommy Fleetwood | 63-64-69-69=265 | −15 | 1,160,000 | 9 | 8 |
| T3 | (United States) Scottie Scheffler | 67-66-65-67=265 | −15 | 1,160,000 | 1 | 1 |
| 5 | (United States) Cameron Young | 69-65-71-64=269 | −11 | 800,000 | 16 | 12 |
| T6 | (United States) Akshay Bhatia | 62-69-70-69=270 | −10 | 670,333 | 45 | 29 |
| T6 | (United States) Rickie Fowler | 66-69-66-69=270 | −10 | 670,333 | 64 | 48 |
| T6 | (United States) Andrew Novak | 68-64-67-71=270 | −10 | 670,333 | 12 | 11 |
| T9 | (Sweden) Ludvig Åberg | 67-67-70-67=271 | −9 | 501,000 | 14 | 13 |
| T9 | (United States) Patrick Cantlay | 70-67-66-68=271 | −9 | 501,000 | 23 | 19 |
| T9 | (United States) Ben Griffin | 66-69-66-70=271 | −9 | 501,000 | 6 | 7 |
| T9 | (United States) Chris Kirk | 68-67-66-70=271 | −9 | 501,000 | 61 | 51 |
| T9 | (United States) Kurt Kitayama | 69-63-72-67=271 | −9 | 501,000 | 52 | 37 |

=== BMW Championship ===
The BMW Championship was played August 14–17; 50 players are eligible, and there was no second-round cut. All eligible players competed except Sepp Straka.

| | | | | | FedEx Cup rank | |
| Place | Player | Score | To par | Winnings ($) | Before | After |
|---|---|---|---|---|---|---|
| 1 | (United States) Scottie Scheffler | 66-65-67-67=265 | −15 | 3,600,000 | 1 | 1 |
| 2 | (Scotland) Robert MacIntyre | 62-64-68-73=267 | −13 | 2,160,000 | 20 | 9 |
| 3 | (United States) Maverick McNealy | 70-64-69-66=269 | −11 | 1,360,000 | 15 | 10 |
| T4 | (United States) Sam Burns | 68-67-67-68=270 | −10 | 910,000 | 24 | 17 |
| T4 | (England) Tommy Fleetwood | 65-69-69-67=270 | −10 | 910,000 | 8 | 5 |
| 6 | (England) Harry Hall | 68-67-67-70=272 | −8 | 750,000 | 45 | 26 |
| T7 | (Sweden) Ludvig Åberg | 68-64-68-73=273 | −7 | 645,000 | 13 | 14 |
| T7 | (United States) Rickie Fowler | 67-70-67-69=273 | −7 | 645,000 | 48 | 32 |
| T7 | (Norway) Viktor Hovland | 67-68-69-69=273 | −7 | 645,000 | 28 | 22 |
| 10 | (United States) Michael Kim | 68-66-70-70=274 | −6 | 560,000 | 42 | 31 |

=== Tour Championship ===
The Tour Championship was played August 21–24 with 30 players eligible, and there was no second-round cut.

In May 2025, the PGA Tour announced updates to the format of the season-ending Tour Championship. Beginning this year, starting strokes, first introduced for the 2018–19 season, will be eliminated, with the tournament now being played as a regular 72-hole stroke-play event, with all players starting the tournament at even par. The player who scores the lowest in the Tour Championship wins the FedEx Cup.

== Table of qualified players ==
Table key:

Win
Top-10 finish
Did not advance to next tournament
Played way into next tournament

| | Player | Pre-Playoffs | | FedEx St. Jude Championship | | BMW Championship | | Tour Championship | |
| | Player | Points | Rank | Finish | Rank after | Finish | Rank after | Finish | Final rank |
|---|---|---|---|---|---|---|---|---|---|
| (United States) | Scottie Scheffler | 4,806 | 1 | T3 | 1 | 1 | 1 | T4 | T4 |
| (Northern Ireland) | Rory McIlroy | 3,444 | 2 | DNP | 2 | T12 | 2 | T23 | T23 |
| (Austria) | Sepp Straka | 2,595 | 3 | T17 | 5 | DNP | 8 | 30 | 30 |
| (United States) | Russell Henley | 2,391 | 4 | T17 | 6 | T15 | 7 | T2 | T2 |
| (United States) | Justin Thomas | 2,280 | 5 | T28 | 9 | T33 | 12 | T7 | T7 |
| (United States) | Ben Griffin | 2,275 | 6 | T9 | 7 | T12 | 6 | T10 | T10 |
| (United States) | Harris English | 2,232 | 7 | T48 | 10 | T12 | 12 | T13 | T13 |
| (United States) | J. J. Spaun | 2,144 | 8 | 2 | 3 | T23 | 3 | T25 | T25 |
| (England) | Tommy Fleetwood | 1,783 | 9 | T3 | 8 | T4 | 5 | 1 | 1 |
| (United States) | Keegan Bradley | 1,749 | 10 | T44 | 14 | T17 | 16 | T7 | T7 |
| (United States) | Maverick McNealy | 1,672 | 11 | T28 | 15 | 3 | 10 | T23 | T23 |
| (United States) | Andrew Novak* | 1,625 | 12 | T6 | 11 | 48 | 15 | T25 | T25 |
| (Canada) | Corey Conners | 1,620 | 13 | T50 | 16 | 39 | 19 | T4 | T4 |
| (Sweden) | Ludvig Åberg | 1,559 | 14 | T9 | 13 | T7 | 14 | T21 | T21 |
| (Scotland) | Robert MacIntyre | 1,488 | 15 | T38 | 20 | 2 | 9 | T17 | T17 |
| (United States) | Cameron Young | 1,464 | 16 | 5 | 12 | 11 | 13 | T4 | T4 |
| (Republic of Ireland) | Shane Lowry | 1,438 | 17 | T59 | 23 | T23 | 24 | T13 | T13 |
| (Canada) | Nick Taylor | 1,438 | 18 | T44 | 22 | T33 | 25 | T19 | T19 |
| (United States) | Collin Morikawa | 1,427 | 19 | T22 | 17 | T33 | 21 | T19 | T19 |
| (United States) | Brian Harman | 1,413 | 20 | T22 | 18 | T19 | 18 | T13 | T13 |
| (Japan) | Hideki Matsuyama | 1,309 | 21 | T17 | 21 | T26 | 23 | 29 | 29 |
| (United States) | Chris Gotterup* | 1,306 | 22 | T54 | 26 | T33 | 29 | T10 | T10 |
| (United States) | Patrick Cantlay | 1,275 | 23 | T9 | 19 | T30 | 20 | T2 | T2 |
| (United States) | Sam Burns | 1,266 | 24 | T28 | 24 | T4 | 17 | T7 | T7 |
| (England) | Justin Rose | 1,220 | 25 | 1 | 4 | T30 | 4 | T21 | T21 |
| (Norway) | Viktor Hovland | 1,210 | 26 | T32 | 28 | T7 | 22 | 12 | 12 |
| (United States) | Lucas Glover | 1,191 | 27 | T44 | 30 | T40 | 36 | – | 36 |
| (United States) | Sam Stevens | 1,182 | 28 | T54 | 31 | 42 | 38 | – | 38 |
| (South Korea) | Im Sung-jae | 1,172 | 29 | T17 | 25 | T40 | 28 | T27 | T27 |
| (United States) | Daniel Berger | 1,167 | 30 | T68 | 33 | WD | 45 | – | 45 |
| (United States) | Ryan Gerard* | 1,158 | 31 | T44 | 32 | 44 | 39 | – | 39 |
| (New Zealand) | Ryan Fox* | 1,126 | 32 | T50 | 34 | 43 | 43 | – | 43 |
| (United States) | Jacob Bridgeman* | 1,111 | 33 | T17 | 27 | T19 | 27 | T27 | T27 |
| (United States) | Brian Campbell* | 1,104 | 34 | T64 | 39 | 47 | 46 | – | 46 |
| (Belgium) | Thomas Detry | 1,080 | 35 | T38 | 36 | 46 | 44 | – | 44 |
| (United States) | Michael Kim | 1,080 | 36 | T59 | 42 | 10 | 31 | – | 31 |
| (Australia) | Jason Day | 1,070 | 37 | T56 | 44 | T23 | 41 | – | 41 |
| (Canada) | Taylor Pendrith | 1,035 | 38 | T28 | 35 | T15 | 33 | – | 33 |
| (United States) | Denny McCarthy | 1,034 | 39 | T32 | 38 | T28 | 40 | – | 40 |
| (United States) | Tom Hoge | 1,026 | 40 | T64 | 47 | T33 | 48 | – | 48 |
| (England) | Matt Fitzpatrick | 1,017 | 41 | T32 | 40 | T17 | 34 | – | 34 |
| (United States) | Xander Schauffele | 953 | 42 | T22 | 43 | T28 | 42 | – | 42 |
| (South Africa) | Aldrich Potgieter* | 941 | 43 | T59 | 52 | – | – | – | 52 |
| (England) | Harry Hall* | 929 | 44 | T22 | 45 | 6 | 26 | T17 | T17 |
| (United States) | Akshay Bhatia | 909 | 45 | T6 | 29 | T26 | 30 | T13 | T13 |
| (South Korea) | Kim Si-woo | 882 | 46 | T14 | 41 | T19 | 37 | – | 37 |
| (United States) | Jake Knapp | 871 | 47 | T62 | 55 | – | – | – | 55 |
| (United States) | Jordan Spieth | 865 | 48 | T38 | 54 | – | – | – | 54 |
| (United States) | Wyndham Clark | 853 | 49 | T56 | 56 | – | – | – | 56 |
| (Australia) | Min Woo Lee | 851 | 50 | T68 | 57 | – | – | – | 57 |
| (United States) | J. T. Poston | 850 | 51 | T22 | 50 | T30 | 49 | – | 49 |
| (United States) | Kurt Kitayama | 842 | 52 | T9 | 37 | T19 | 35 | – | 35 |
| (United States) | Bud Cauley | 831 | 53 | T14 | 46 | T33 | 47 | – | 47 |
| (United States) | Joe Highsmith* | 828 | 54 | 67 | 59 | – | – | – | 59 |
| (England) | Aaron Rai | 811 | 55 | T22 | 53 | – | – | – | 53 |
| (Venezuela) | Jhonattan Vegas | 783 | 56 | T14 | 49 | 45 | 50 | – | 50 |
| (United States) | Max Greyserman | 768 | 57 | T32 | 58 | – | – | – | 58 |
| (Germany) | Stephan Jäger | 726 | 58 | T48 | 60 | – | – | – | 60 |
| (Canada) | Mackenzie Hughes | 704 | 59 | T56 | 65 | – | – | – | 65 |
| (United States) | Tony Finau | 690 | 60 | T64 | 66 | – | – | – | 66 |
| (United States) | Chris Kirk | 682 | 61 | T9 | 51 | – | – | – | 51 |
| (Colombia) | Nico Echavarría* | 672 | 62 | T38 | 62 | – | – | – | 62 |
| (United States) | Patrick Rodgers | 668 | 63 | T38 | 64 | – | – | – | 64 |
| (United States) | Rickie Fowler | 665 | 64 | T6 | 48 | T7 | 32 | – | 32 |
| (United States) | Davis Riley | 652 | 65 | T32 | 61 | – | – | – | 61 |
| (Taiwan) | Kevin Yu* | 645 | 66 | T32 | 63 | – | – | – | 63 |
| (Argentina) | Emiliano Grillo | 637 | 67 | T50 | 68 | – | – | – | 68 |
| (South Africa) | Erik van Rooyen | 634 | 68 | T62 | 70 | – | – | – | 70 |
| (Australia) | Cameron Davis | 625 | 69 | T50 | 69 | – | – | – | 69 |
| (Germany) | Matti Schmid* | 620 | 70 | T38 | 67 | – | – | – | 67 |

* First-time Playoffs qualifier
DNP = Did not play
WD = Withdrew
