= Jonsson Workwear =

South African workwear manufacturer and retailer

- Type: Private
- Industry: Clothing, Personal protective equipment
- Founded: 1968; 58 years ago (as a general trading business); 2000 (as Jonsson Workwear)
- Founder: Ben Jonsson
- Headquarters: Durban, South Africa
- Area served: Southern Africa
- Key people: Nick Jonsson (chairman and chief executive)
- Products: Workwear, footwear, personal protective equipment
- Number of employees: c. 5,000 (2026)
- Website: www.jonssonworkwear.com

Jonsson Workwear is a South African manufacturer and retailer of workwear, safety footwear and personal protective equipment. Based in Durban, KwaZulu-Natal, it manufactures clothing in Lesotho and Mauritius and sells its products through retail stores in South Africa and distributors elsewhere in Southern Africa. The business employed about 5,000 people in 2026.

Jonsson Workwear is the title sponsor of the Jonsson Workwear Open golf tournament. In 2026, Cricket South Africa named it an official sponsor of the national cricket teams and its own official workwear and apparel supplier. The company was named headline sponsor to Cricket South Africa in October 2026.

== History ==
The business was founded by Ben Jonsson in 1968 as a general trading operation in KwaZulu-Natal. It initially sold a range of goods, including household products and overalls for boilermakers. By the late 1970s, it had expanded into supplying women's clothing to large retail chains.

Ben Jonsson's son, Nick, joined the business in the mid-1980s and took over its management in the early 1990s. In 2000, he shifted its focus towards workwear manufacturing and renamed the business Jonsson Workwear. (Note: The company has elsewhere dated its founding to 1955. In December 2005 it marked a "50th birthday" with a notice on its website stating that the business had been started by Ben Jonsson in 1955, and the figure recurs in its later marketing material. The 1968 date used here comes from a 2026 interview with Nick Jonsson published by Maroela Media.)

Manufacturing began in Lesotho in 2002, initially employing about 70 people. In 2013, Jonsson completed a R100-million distribution centre near O. R. Tambo International Airport in Gauteng. The 12,000 m^{2} facility increased the company's annual distribution capacity from seven million to 20 million garments.

The Jonsson Foundation, the company's corporate social investment arm, was established in 2018. The Financial Mail described it as the lead partner of Rally to Read, a rural education programme founded in 1998.

During the 2020s, Jonsson began building a garment factory in Nhlangano in the Shiselweni Region of Eswatini. In November 2025 the 20,000 m^{2} facility was reported to be in its final construction phase, with the potential to employ up to 2,000 people at full capacity. In July 2026, Eswatini's minister of commerce, industry and trade, Manqoba Khumalo, told parliament that construction was complete and that machinery installation was due to begin the following month.

== Operations ==
Jonsson Workwear is headquartered on Umgeni Road in Durban. Its products include workwear, safety footwear and personal protective equipment, including gloves and eye protection.

As of March 2026, Jonsson operated about 30 retail stores in South Africa. It had manufacturing operations in Lesotho and Mauritius, with a further factory under construction in Eswatini, as well as a prototype development facility in Durban. Its products were distributed in Namibia, Eswatini, Mozambique, Zambia, Botswana, the Democratic Republic of the Congo and Tanzania.

=== Lesotho ===
Jonsson's Lesotho subsidiary, Jonsson Manufacturing, operates a factory in Maputsoe. It employed 4,024 people in 2020.

In April 2019, the factory dismissed about 700 workers following a strike that the employer and the Lesotho Ministry of Labour considered unlawful. The Directorate of Dispute Prevention and Resolution later ruled that the dismissals were unlawful, but awarded the workers three months' wages instead of reinstatement. The National Clothing and Textile Workers Union called for the workers to be reinstated.

== Sponsorships ==
Jonsson Workwear branding on the back, Lions in South Africa (Sanele Nohamba)

Jonsson Workwear has sponsored South African sport since 2010, including rugby clubs and the Currie Cup. It agreed a two-year deal with the Golden Lions that placed its branding on the team's jerseys in Super Rugby and the Currie Cup, added signage at Ellis Park Stadium and supplied workwear to the union's players and staff.

The company became the title sponsor of a professional golf tournament in South Africa in 2022. The inaugural Jonsson Workwear Open was co-sanctioned by the Sunshine Tour and the European Challenge Tour, with a purse of US$250,000. Jonsson initially committed to a three-year sponsorship.

The tournament was co-sanctioned by the DP World Tour in 2023 and 2024. No edition was played in 2025; it returned in 2026 as the Jonsson Workwear Durban Open, co-sanctioned by the Sunshine Tour and Challenge Tour.

In August 2026, Cricket South Africa announced a multi-year agreement naming Jonsson Workwear an official sponsor of the Proteas and the organisation's official workwear and apparel supplier, with its logo appearing on the sleeves of the men's and women's ODI and T20I playing kits. The company also supplies apparel to the South African Toyota Gazoo Racing Dakar Rally team and to South Africa's domestic Twenty20 cricket competition.
