= Jonsson Workwear Open =

Professional golf tournament

Coordinates: 29.828°S 31.034°E

Jonsson Workwear Durban Open
Tournament information
- Location: Durban, South Africa
- Established: 2022
- Course: Durban Country Club
- Par: 72
- Length: 6,780 yards (6,200 m)
- Tours: European Tour; Sunshine Tour; Challenge Tour
- Format: Stroke play
- Prize fund: US$375,000
- Month played: February

Tournament record score
- Aggregate: 260 J. C. Ritchie (2022)
- To par: −26 J. C. Ritchie (2022) −26 Matteo Manassero (2024)

Current champion
- (South Africa) Oliver Bekker

Location map
- Location in South Africa Location in KwaZulu-Natal

The Jonsson Workwear Open is a professional golf tournament, currently held at Durban Country Club, in Durban, South Africa. It was last played on the European Tour and Sunshine Tour as a co-sanctioned event, having inaugurably been played on the Challenge Tour in 2022.

The tournament is named for its title sponsor, Jonsson Workwear, a workwear manufacturer based in Durban.

== History ==
The tournament was inaugurated in 2022 as a co-sanctioned event between the Sunshine Tour and Challenge Tour. J. C. Ritchie won the event, shooting 26-under-par, beating Christopher Mivis by six shots.

The 2023 event was scheduled as a co-sanctioned European Tour and Sunshine Tour event, played at The Club at Steyn City, the same venue in which the 2022 Steyn City Championship was played at.

In 2024, Matteo Manassero won the tournament by three shots in fading light, claiming his fifth European Tour victory and first in nearly 11 years.

No tournament was played in 2025, but the tournament did return in 2026 as part of the Challenge Tour and Sunshine Tour schedules.

== Winners ==
Year	Tours (Note: AFR − Sunshine Tour; CHA − Challenge Tour; EUR − European Tour.)	Winner	Score	To par	Margin of victory	Runner(s)-up	Venue
Jonsson Workwear Durban Open
2026	AFR, CHA	(South Africa) Oliver Bekker	200 (Note: Shortened to 54 holes due to weather.)	−16	2 strokes	(Sweden) Christofer Blomstrand	Durban
Jonsson Workwear Open
2025: No tournament
2024	AFR, EUR	(Italy) Matteo Manassero	262	−26	3 strokes	(South Africa) Thriston Lawrence (South Africa) Shaun Norris (England) Jordan Smith	Glendower
2023	AFR, EUR	(Germany) Nick Bachem	264	−24	4 strokes	(South Africa) Hennie du Plessis (South Africa) Zander Lombard	Steyn City
2022	AFR, CHA	(South Africa) J. C. Ritchie	260	−26	6 strokes	(Belgium) Christopher Mivis	Durban; Mount Edgecombe
