= Tommy Fleetwood =

English professional golfer (born 1991)

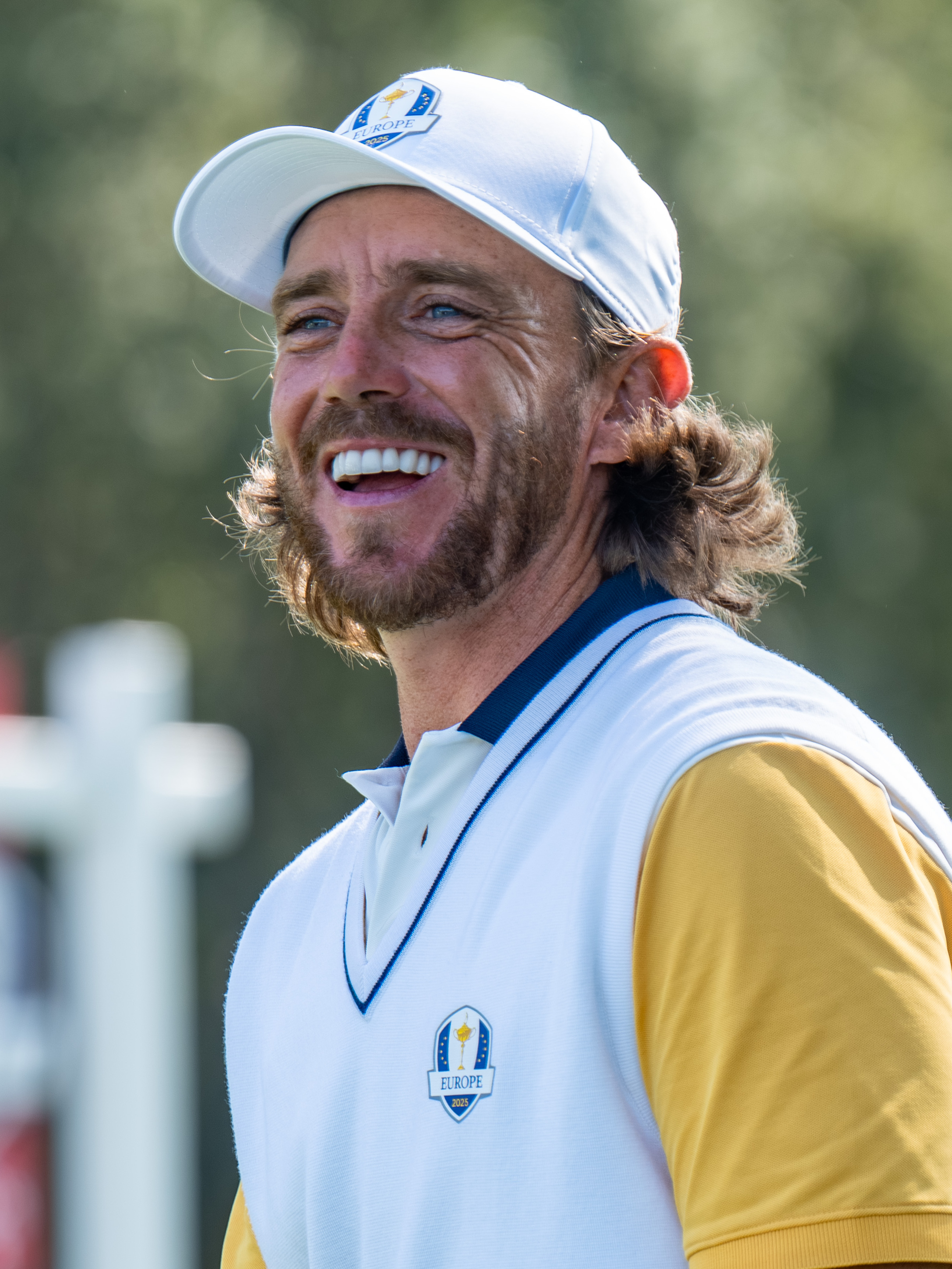
- Fleetwood at the 2025 Ryder Cup

Personal information
- Full name: Thomas Paul Fleetwood
- Nationality: England
- Born: 19 January 1991 (age 35) Southport, Merseyside, England
- Spouse: Clare Craig (m. 2017)
- Children: 1

Career
- Sport: Golf
- Turned professional: 2010
- Current tours: European Tour; PGA Tour
- Former tours: Challenge Tour; PGA EuroPro Tour
- Professional wins: 11
- Highest ranking: 3 (30 November 2025) (as of 15 November 2026)

Number of wins by tour
- PGA Tour: 1
- European Tour: 8
- Sunshine Tour: 1
- Challenge Tour: 1
- Other: 1

Best results in major championships
- Masters Tournament: T3: 2024
- PGA Championship: T5: 2022
- U.S. Open: 2nd: 2018
- The Open Championship: 2nd: 2019

Achievements and awards
- Challenge Tour Rankings winner: 2011
- European Tour Race to Dubai winner: 2017
- European Tour Players' Player of the Year: 2017
- PGA Tour FedEx Cup winner: 2025
Medal record
Men's golf
Representing Great Britain
Olympic Games
Silver medal – second place	2024 Paris	Individual

Thomas Paul Fleetwood (born 19 January 1991) is an English professional golfer who plays on the PGA Tour and European Tour. He has won eight times on the European Tour. In 2025, Fleetwood recorded his first win on the PGA Tour at the Tour Championship, which secured him the 2025 FedEx Cup. He has also won a silver medal for Great Britain at the 2024 Olympic Games and three Ryder Cups with Europe.

== Early life and amateur career ==
Fleetwood was born on 19 January 1991 in Southport, Merseyside, England. He had a distinguished amateur career which included wins in the 2009 Scottish Amateur Stroke Play Championship and the 2010 English Amateur, and runner-up finishes in the 2008 Amateur Championship, the 2010 New South Wales Amateur and the 2010 Spanish Amateur and the 2010 European Amateur. Fleetwood represented Great Britain and Ireland in the Walker Cup in 2009. He also reached number 3 in The R&A's World Amateur Golf Ranking, and number 1 on the Scratch Players World Amateur Rankings.

In July 2010, Fleetwood finished as runner-up to Daniel Gaunt in the English Challenge on Europe's second tier Challenge Tour. Fleetwood won the English Amateur at the beginning of August and turned professional shortly afterwards.

== Professional career ==
Fleetwood made his professional debut at the 2010 Czech Open on the European Tour, where he made the cut and finished tied for 67th. In September 2011, he claimed his first Challenge Tour win at the Kazakhstan Open, which secured his place on the European Tour for 2012. He was the 2011 Challenge Tour Rankings winner at the conclusion of the season.

In August 2013, Fleetwood won his maiden title on the European Tour at the Johnnie Walker Championship at Gleneagles. He won in a three-man sudden death playoff, after a birdie on the first extra hole to see off Stephen Gallacher and Ricardo González.

On 22 May 2015, Fleetwood scored an albatross on the par-5 4th hole at the Wentworth Club during the second round of the BMW PGA Championship.

In January 2017, Fleetwood won his second European Tour event, the Abu Dhabi HSBC Golf Championship, by one stroke over Dustin Johnson and Pablo Larrazábal after a final round 67. In March, Fleetwood was runner-up in the WGC-Mexico Championship, a shot behind Johnson. In April, he lost in a sudden-death playoff at the Shenzhen International to Bernd Wiesberger, at the first extra hole. Fleetwood had come from eight strokes behind on the final day with a stunning round of 63 to set the clubhouse lead. In the playoff, Fleetwood found the green in two, but Wiesberger from trouble fired an approach to within five feet and holed the birdie putt for the victory. In June, Fleetwood finished fourth in the U.S. Open, while in July, he won the Open de France, beating Peter Uihlein by a stroke, after a bogey-free final round 66. He moved from 99th in the World Rankings at the start of the year into the world top-20. In November 2017, Fleetwood won the European Tour season-long Race to Dubai and won $1,250,000 from the bonus pool.

Fleetwood won the Abu Dhabi HSBC Championship by two strokes from Ross Fisher to begin the 2018 season. He had a final round of 65, with six birdies in the last nine holes.

Fleetwood is the sixth golfer to shoot a 63 in U.S. Open history, tying the championship's single round scoring record. He did this in the fourth round of the 2018 U.S. Open on 17 June at the Shinnecock Hills Golf Club in Southampton, New York. He finished one stroke behind the winner Brooks Koepka.

In the 2018 Ryder Cup, Fleetwood paired with Francesco Molinari. They became the first pairing to win all four of their matches, as Europe won 17.5–10.5

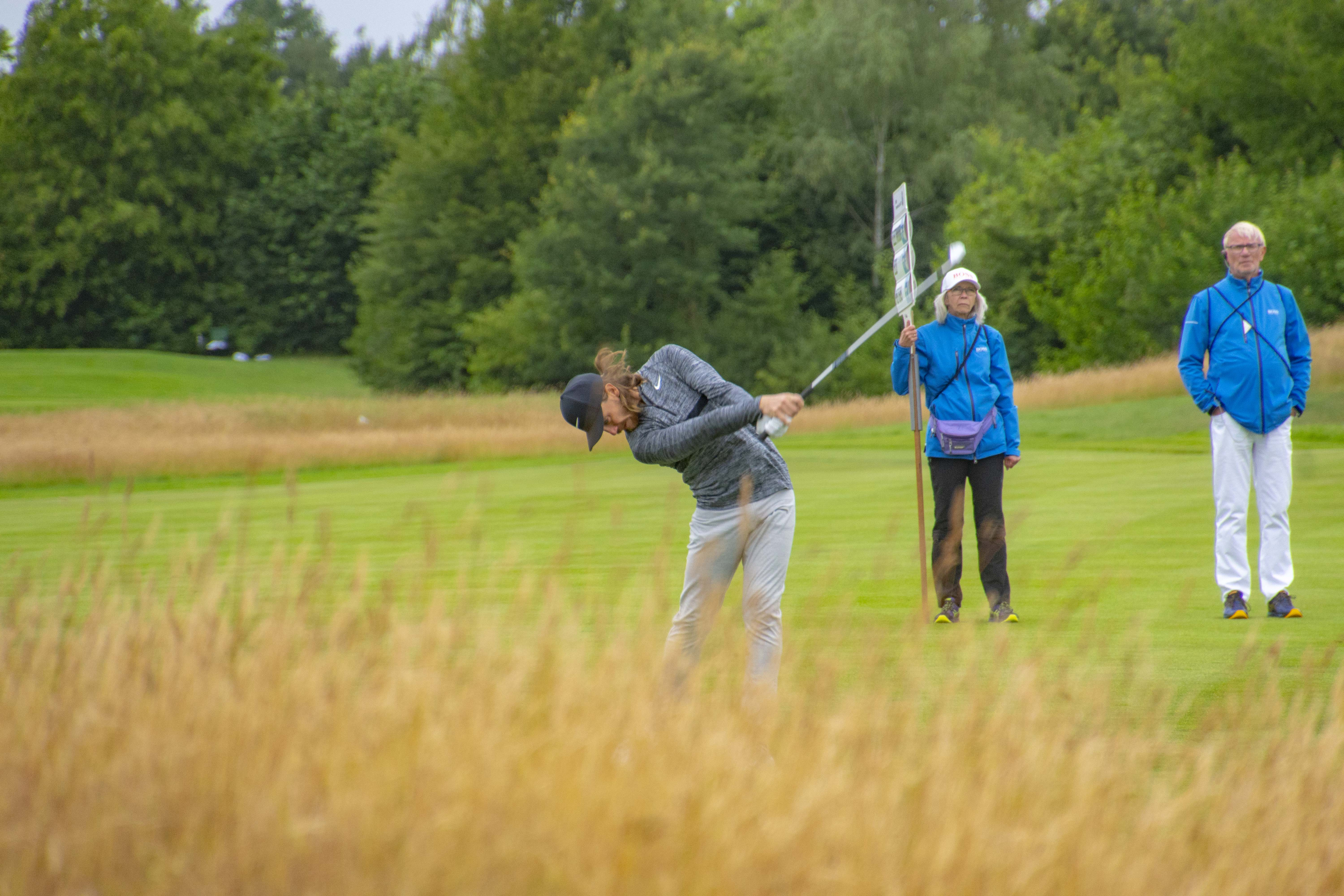
Fleetwood at the 2018 BMW International Open.

In July 2019, Fleetwood finished second in the 2019 Open Championship at Royal Portrush Golf Club in Northern Ireland.

In November 2019, Fleetwood made three eagles in the final round to win the Nedbank Golf Challenge in South Africa. Fleetwood won in a playoff over Marcus Kinhult. This event was part of the European Tour's Rolex Series and was co-sanctioned by the Sunshine Tour.

In October 2020, Fleetwood birdied the 72nd hole to join Aaron Rai in a playoff at the Aberdeen Standard Investments Scottish Open. However, he was defeated when he missed a par putt from short-range on the first extra hole.

In September 2021, Fleetwood played on the European team in the 2021 Ryder Cup at Whistling Straits in Kohler, Wisconsin. The U.S. team won 19–9, and Fleetwood went 0–1–2, including a tie in his Sunday singles match against Jordan Spieth.

Fleetwood finished in a tie for fifth place at the 2022 PGA Championship, and in a share for fourth place at the Open Championship. In November 2022, Fleetwood won the Nedbank Golf Challenge at Gary Player Country Club in South Africa. He successfully defended this title, having been last played in 2019. It was also his first victory since then as well.

In June 2023, Fleetwood tied on top of the leaderboard of the RBC Canadian Open after 72 holes with Nick Taylor, forcing a playoff. He lost the playoff on the fourth hole after Taylor made a 72-foot eagle putt. One week later, in the 2023 U.S. Open at Los Angeles Country Club, Fleetwood made history by becoming the first man ever to shoot multiple final round score of 63 in the U.S. Open history. He finished the tournament in a share for fifth place. At the Open Championship, he finished in a tie for tenth place. In September 2023, Fleetwood played on the European team in the 2023 Ryder Cup at Marco Simone Golf and Country Club in Guidonia, Rome, Italy. He was paired with Rory McIlroy for the Friday and Saturday foursomes. Dubbed as "Fleetwood Mac", the pair won both their matches. He lost the Saturday fourballs session playing with Nicolai Højgaard. He scored the decisive point in his single match win on Sunday against Rickie Fowler to help the European Team reclaimed the Ryder Cup for the first time since 2018. He went 3–1–0 on the event.

In January 2024, Fleetwood won the first edition of Dubai Invitational to open his 2024 season. He shot a final round 67 with a birdie-birdie finish to beat Rory McIlroy and Thriston Lawrence by one shot. In April 2024, Fleetwood achieved his career-best finish to date at the Masters, finishing tied for third with Max Homa and Collin Morikawa. He played the tournament with local caddie, Gray Moore after his caddie, Ian Finnis had to miss the tournament due to illness.

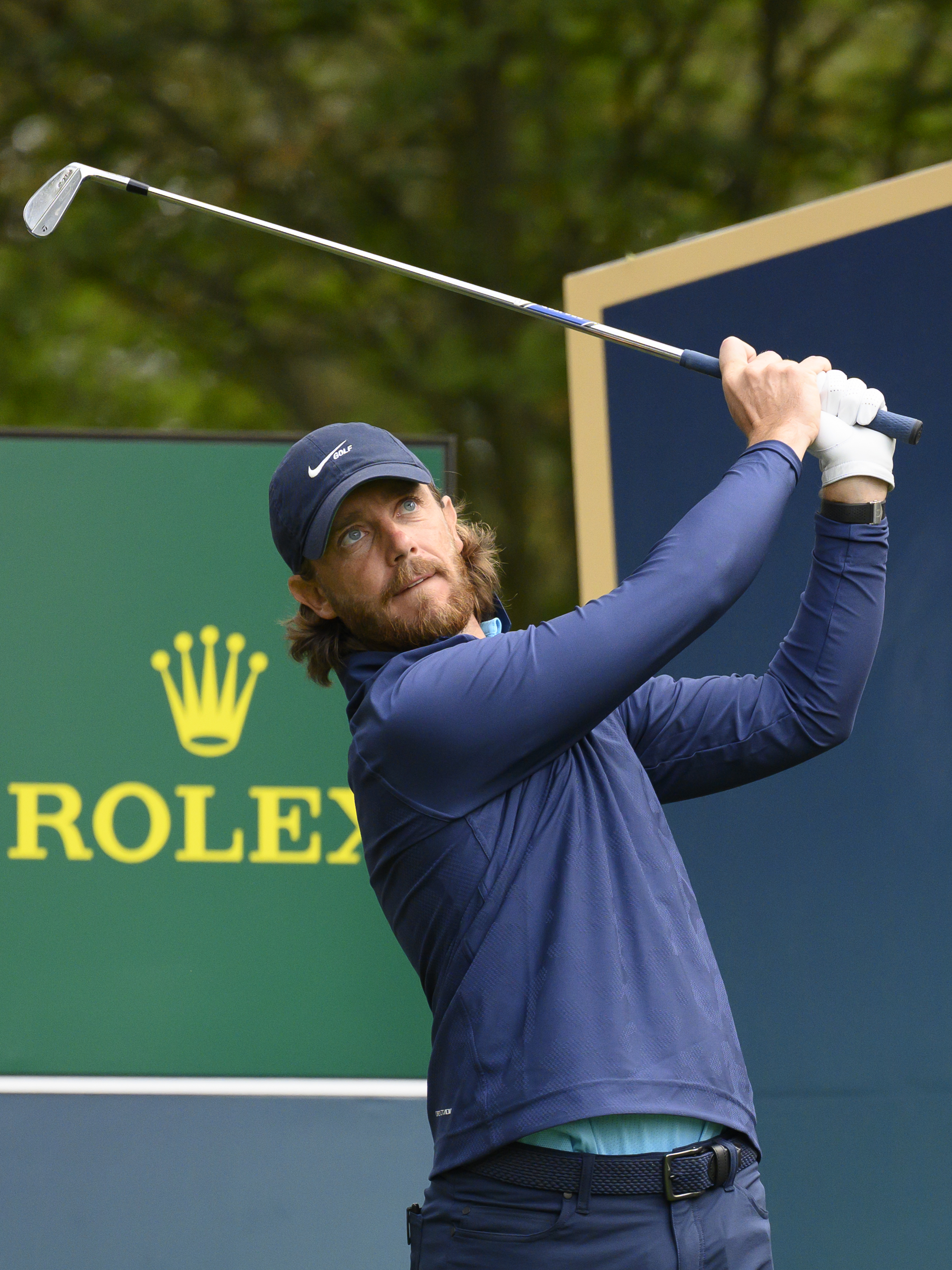
Fleetwood in 2023

At the 2024 Summer Olympics, Fleetwood won a silver medal after finishing the tournament 18 under par, one shot behind gold medalist Scottie Scheffler.

In June 2025, Fleetwood held the 54-hole lead at the Travelers Championship on the PGA Tour. After recording 41 top-10 finishes on the PGA Tour, Fleetwood was in a favourable position to claim his first PGA Tour win. However, Keegan Bradley birdied the final hole to overtake Fleetwood after he made bogey on the final hole. Fleetwood also held the lead after the third round of the FedEx St. Jude Championship, but ended up finishing T3rd, his 29th career top-5 finish on the PGA Tour.

On 24 August 2025, Fleetwood won the Tour Championship for his first PGA Tour victory in his 164th event along with the FedEx Cup and its $10 million prize. Prior to winning the event, Fleetwood had 30 top-five finishes and was the runner-up half a dozen of those times. After the event, Fleetwood commented "I've been a PGA Tour winner for a long time. It's just always been in my mind [until now]"

At the 2025 Ryder Cup, Fleetwood was a member of the European team that triumphed 15‍–‍13 over the United States at Bethpage Black. He won both his foursomes matches with playing partner Rory McIlroy as well as claiming wins in both his four-ball matches alongside Justin Rose. He was defeated by Justin Thomas in the singles. At the end of the event, Fleetwood was given the Nicklaus-Jacklin Award.

In October 2025, Fleetwood shot a 7-under 65 in the final round to win the DP World India Championship. He won by two strokes over 54-hole leader Keita Nakajima. The following month, he reached a playoff at the Abu Dhabi Golf Championship, but was defeated on the first extra hole by Aaron Rai who made birdie. Later in November, Fleetwood finished in a share for third place at the DP World Tour Championship.

Fleetwood finished in a tie for fourth at the 2026 Open Championship, his challenge faltering on the final day after three successive bogeys at holes 9, 10 and 11.

== Personal life ==
In 2017, Fleetwood married Clare Craig, who also acts as his manager and is 23 years his senior. They have one son together named Frankie born in 2017. Fleetwood also has two stepsons from Clare's first marriage, Oscar and Murray. In April 2024, Oscar made his first appearance on the Challenge Tour at the UAE Challenge, where Fleetwood acted as his caddie for the week.

Fleetwood is a fan of Everton F.C.

In March 2025, Fleetwood received an honorary fellowship from Liverpool John Moores University.

== Amateur wins ==
- 2009 Scottish Open Amateur Stroke Play Championship
- 2010 English Amateur

== Professional wins (11) ==
=== PGA Tour wins (1) ===
Legend
FedEx Cup playoff events (1)
Other PGA Tour (0)

No.	Date	Tournament	Winning score	Margin of victory	Runners-up
1	24 Aug 2025	Tour Championship	−18 (64-63-67-68=262)	3 strokes	(United States) Patrick Cantlay, (United States) Russell Henley

PGA Tour playoff record (0–1)

No.	Year	Tournament	Opponent	Result
1	2023	RBC Canadian Open	(Canada) Nick Taylor	Lost to eagle on fourth extra hole

=== European Tour wins (8) ===
Legend
Rolex Series (2)
Other European Tour (6)

No.	Date	Tournament	Winning score	Margin of victory	Runner(s)-up
1	25 Aug 2013	Johnnie Walker Championship at Gleneagles	−18 (68-65-67-70=270)	Playoff	(Scotland) Stephen Gallacher, (Argentina) Ricardo González
2	22 Jan 2017	Abu Dhabi HSBC Championship	−17 (67-67-70-67=271)	1 stroke	(United States) Dustin Johnson, (Spain) Pablo Larrazábal
3	2 Jul 2017	HNA Open de France	−12 (67-68-71-66=272)	1 stroke	(United States) Peter Uihlein
4	21 Jan 2018	Abu Dhabi HSBC Championship (2)	−22 (66-68-67-65=266)	2 strokes	(England) Ross Fisher
5	17 Nov 2019	Nedbank Golf Challenge^{1}	−12 (69-69-73-65=276)	Playoff	(Sweden) Marcus Kinhult
6	13 Nov 2022	Nedbank Golf Challenge^{2} (2)	−11 (70-70-70-67=277)	1 stroke	(New Zealand) Ryan Fox
7	14 Jan 2024	Dubai Invitational	−19 (66-69-63-67=265)	1 stroke	(South Africa) Thriston Lawrence, (Northern Ireland) Rory McIlroy
8	19 Oct 2025	DP World India Championship^{3}	−22 (68-64-69-65=266)	2 strokes	(Japan) Keita Nakajima

^{1}Co-sanctioned by the Sunshine Tour
^{2}Co-sanctioned by the Sunshine Tour, but unofficial event on that tour.
^{3}Co-sanctioned by the Professional Golf Tour of India

European Tour playoff record (2–3)

No.	Year	Tournament	Opponent(s)	Result
1	2013	Johnnie Walker Championship at Gleneagles	(Scotland) Stephen Gallacher, (Argentina) Ricardo González	Won with birdie on first extra hole
2	2017	Shenzhen International	(Austria) Bernd Wiesberger	Lost to birdie on first extra hole
3	2019	Nedbank Golf Challenge	(Sweden) Marcus Kinhult	Won with par on first extra hole
4	2020	Aberdeen Standard Investments Scottish Open	(England) Aaron Rai	Lost to par on first extra hole
5	2025	Abu Dhabi HSBC Championship	(England) Aaron Rai	Lost to birdie on first extra hole

=== Challenge Tour wins (1) ===
No.	Date	Tournament	Winning score	Margin of victory	Runner-up
1	11 Sep 2011	Kazakhstan Open	−15 (68-69-66-70=273)	2 strokes	(Norway) Knut Børsheim

=== PGA EuroPro Tour wins (1) ===
No.	Date	Tournament	Winning score	Margin of victory	Runners-up
1	5 Aug 2011	Formby Hall Classic	−16 (67-68-65=200)	4 strokes	(England) Graeme Clark, (England) Luke Goddard, (England) Warren Bennett

== Results in major championships ==
Results not in chronological order in 2020.

Tournament	2014	2015	2016	2017	2018
Masters Tournament				CUT	T17
U.S. Open		T27		4	2
The Open Championship	CUT	CUT	CUT	T27	T12
PGA Championship	CUT	CUT		T61	T35

Tournament	2019	2020	2021	2022	2023	2024	2025	2026
Masters Tournament	T36	T19	T46	T14	33	T3	T21	T33
PGA Championship	T48	T29	CUT	T5	T18	T26	T41	CUT
U.S. Open	T65	CUT	T50	CUT	T5	T16	CUT	T11
The Open Championship	2	NT	T33	T4	T10	CUT	T16	T4

Top 10
Did not play

CUT = missed the half-way cut
"T" indicates a tie for a place
NT = no tournament due to COVID-19 pandemic

=== Summary ===
Tournament	Wins	2nd	3rd	Top-5	Top-10	Top-25	Events	Cuts made
Masters Tournament	0	0	1	1	1	5	10	9
PGA Championship	0	0	0	1	1	2	12	8
U.S. Open	0	1	0	3	3	5	11	8
The Open Championship	0	1	0	3	4	6	12	8
Totals	0	2	1	8	9	18	45	33

- Most consecutive cuts made – 12 (2017 U.S. Open – 2020 PGA)
- Longest streak of top-10s – 3 (2023 U.S. Open – 2024 Masters)

== Results in The Players Championship ==
Tournament	2017	2018	2019	2020	2021	2022	2023	2024	2025	2026
The Players Championship	T41	T7	T5	C	CUT	T22	T27	T35	T14	T8

Top 10

CUT = missed the halfway cut
"T" indicates a tie for a place
C = cancelled after the first round due to the COVID-19 pandemic

== Results in World Golf Championships ==
Results not in chronological order before 2015.

Tournament	2013	2014	2015	2016	2017	2018	2019	2020	2021	2022	2023
Championship			T71		2	T14	T19	T18	T44		
Match Play			QF		T39	T17	T24	NT^{1}	QF	T35	T52
Invitational					T28	T14	T4	T35	T46		
Champions	T18	T24	T30		T20	T7	T53	NT^{1}	NT^{1}	NT^{1}	

^{1}Cancelled due to COVID-19 pandemic

Top 10
Did not play

QF, R16, R32, R64 = Round in which player lost in match play
NT = No Tournament
"T" = tied
Note that the Championship and Invitational were discontinued from 2022. The Champions was discontinued from 2023.

== Team appearances ==
Amateur

- European Boys' Team Championship (representing England): 2007, 2008
- Jacques Léglise Trophy (representing Great Britain & Ireland): 2007 (winners), 2008 (winners)
- European Amateur Team Championship (representing England): 2009, 2010 (winners)
- Walker Cup (representing Great Britain & Ireland): 2009
- Bonallack Trophy (representing Europe): 2010 (cancelled)

Professional

- Seve Trophy (representing Great Britain & Ireland): 2013
- EurAsia Cup (representing Europe): 2018 (winners)
- Ryder Cup (representing Europe): 2018 (winners), 2021, 2023 (winners), 2025 (winners)
- Team Cup (representing Great Britain & Ireland): 2023 (playing captain), 2025 (winners)

Ryder Cup points record
2018	2021	2023	2025	Total
4	1	3	4	12

== See also ==
- 2011 Challenge Tour graduates
- List of golfers with most European Tour wins
