= Abu Dhabi Golf Championship =

Abu Dhabi Aldar Championship

Tournament information
- Location: Abu Dhabi, United Arab Emirates
- Established: 2006
- Course: Yas Links
- Par: 72
- Length: 7,425 yards (6,789 m)
- Organized by: IMG
- Tour: European Tour
- Format: Stroke play
- Prize fund: US$9,000,000
- Month played: November

Tournament record score
- Aggregate: 263 Tommy Fleetwood (2025); 263 Aaron Rai (2025)
- To par: −25 as above

Current champion
- (Spain) Jon Rahm

Location map
- Location in the United Arab Emirates

The Abu Dhabi Golf Championship is a European Tour golf tournament held in Abu Dhabi, United Arab Emirates. When founded in 2006, it was one of three European Tour events to be staged in the Arabian Peninsula, but at one point was one of six.

== History ==
The prize fund for each of the first five editions was US$2,000,000, and grew to reach US$3,000,000 in 2018. In 2019 it was elevated to be one of eight tournaments which are part of the Rolex Series, which identifies it as one of the European Tour's premier events. As a Rolex series event, the prize fund increased to US$7,000,000.

With the support of sponsor HSBC and the local organiser, Abu Dhabi Sports Council, it has historically had one of the strongest fields on the European Tour due to "promotional" money paid to top golfers.

A change of venue was announced for the 2022 event, with the tournament being played at Yas Links, Abu Dhabi, located on Yas Island. From 2006 to 2021 the tournament had been hosted at Abu Dhabi Golf Club.

== Winners ==
European Tour (Playoff event and Rolex Series)	2024–
European Tour (Rolex Series)	2019–2023
European Tour (Regular)	2006–2018

#	Year	Winner	Score	To par	Margin of victory	Runner(s)-up	Purse (US$)	Winner's share ($)
Abu Dhabi Aldar Championship
21st	2026	(Spain) Jon Rahm	265	−23	2 strokes	(England) Tyrrell Hatton	9,000,000	1,530,000
Abu Dhabi HSBC Championship
20th	2025	(England) Aaron Rai	263	−25	Playoff	(England) Tommy Fleetwood	9,000,000	1,530,000
19th	2024	(England) Paul Waring	264	−24	2 strokes	(England) Tyrrell Hatton	9,000,000	1,530,000
18th	2023	(France) Victor Perez	270	−18	1 stroke	(Australia) Min Woo Lee (Sweden) Sebastian Söderberg	9,000,000	1,530,000
17th	2022	(Belgium) Thomas Pieters	278	−10	1 stroke	(Spain) Rafa Cabrera-Bello (India) Shubhankar Sharma	8,000,000	1,333,330
16th	2021	(England) Tyrrell Hatton	270	−18	4 strokes	(Australia) Jason Scrivener	8,000,000	1,333,330
15th	2020	(England) Lee Westwood	269	−19	2 strokes	(England) Matt Fitzpatrick (England) Tommy Fleetwood (France) Victor Perez	7,000,000	1,166,660
14th	2019	(Republic of Ireland) Shane Lowry	270	−18	1 stroke	(South Africa) Richard Sterne	7,000,000	1,166,660
13th	2018	(England) Tommy Fleetwood (2)	266	−22	2 strokes	(England) Ross Fisher	3,000,000	500,000
12th	2017	(England) Tommy Fleetwood	271	−17	1 stroke	(United States) Dustin Johnson (Spain) Pablo Larrazábal	2,700,000	450,000
Abu Dhabi HSBC Golf Championship
11th	2016	(United States) Rickie Fowler	272	−16	1 stroke	(Belgium) Thomas Pieters	2,700,000	450,000
10th	2015	(France) Gary Stal	269	−19	1 stroke	(Northern Ireland) Rory McIlroy	2,700,000	450,000
9th	2014	(Spain) Pablo Larrazábal	274	−14	1 stroke	(Northern Ireland) Rory McIlroy (United States) Phil Mickelson	2,700,000	450,000
8th	2013	(Wales) Jamie Donaldson	274	−14	1 stroke	(Denmark) Thorbjørn Olesen (England) Justin Rose	2,700,000	450,000
7th	2012	(England) Robert Rock	275	−13	1 stroke	(Northern Ireland) Rory McIlroy	2,700,000	450,000
6th	2011	(Germany) Martin Kaymer (3)	264	−24	8 strokes	(Northern Ireland) Rory McIlroy	2,700,000	450,000
Abu Dhabi Golf Championship
5th	2010	(Germany) Martin Kaymer (2)	267	−21	1 stroke	(England) Ian Poulter	2,000,000	333,330
4th	2009	(England) Paul Casey (2)	267	−21	1 stroke	(Germany) Martin Kaymer (South Africa) Louis Oosthuizen	2,000,000	333,330
3rd	2008	(Germany) Martin Kaymer	273	−15	4 strokes	(Sweden) Henrik Stenson (England) Lee Westwood	2,000,000	333,330
2nd	2007	(England) Paul Casey	271	−17	1 stroke	(Sweden) Peter Hanson (Spain) Miguel Ángel Jiménez	2,000,000	333,330
1st	2006	(United States) Chris DiMarco	268	−20	1 stroke	(Sweden) Henrik Stenson	2,000,000	333,330
