= Dubai Invitational =

Professional golf tournament

Coordinates: 25.243°N 55.334°E

Tournament information
- Location: Dubai, United Arab Emirates
- Established: 2024
- Course: Dubai Creek Golf & Yacht Club
- Par: 71
- Length: 7,059 yards (6,455 m)
- Tour: European Tour
- Format: Stroke play
- Prize fund: US$2,750,000
- Month played: January

Tournament record score
- Aggregate: 265 Tommy Fleetwood (2024)
- To par: −19 as above

Current champion
- (Spain) Nacho Elvira

Location map
- Location in the United Arab Emirates

The Dubai Invitational is a professional golf tournament played on the European Tour.

The tournament was revealed as part of the 2024 European Tour schedule announcement in August 2023. The invitational tournament is a limited-field pro-am with 60 professionals playing alongside 60 amateurs in the first three rounds, with the final round taking place between the professionals only. The tournament is played biannually.

Tommy Fleetwood won the inaugural edition, birdieing the final hole to beat Thriston Lawrence and Rory McIlroy by one shot. The inaugural event also gained attraction and scrutiny due to American club professional Ken Weyand being given a sponsor's invite to play in the event. He only managed to make two birdies during the week, finishing at 53-over-par; 72 shots behind the winning score.

== Winners ==
Year	Winner	Score	To par	Margin of victory	Runner(s)-up
2026	(Spain) Nacho Elvira	274	−10	1 stroke	(New Zealand) Daniel Hillier
2024	(England) Tommy Fleetwood	265	−19	1 stroke	(South Africa) Thriston Lawrence (Northern Ireland) Rory McIlroy
