= Qingdao Golf Open =

Golf tournament in 2008

Tournament information
- Location: Qingdao, China
- Established: 2008
- Courses: Qingdao Huashan Golf & Resort
- Par: 72
- Length: 7,098 yards (6,490 m)
- Tour: Challenge Tour
- Format: Stroke play
- Prize fund: US$500,000
- Month played: September
- Final year: 2008

Tournament record score
- Aggregate: 269 Gareth Maybin (2008)
- To par: −19 as above

Final champion
- (Northern Ireland) Gareth Maybin
- Location in China

The Qingdao Golf Open was a golf tournament on the Challenge Tour, played in China. It was held in 2008 at the Qingdao Huashan Golf & Resort, in Qingdao.

With a prize fund of US$500,000 it was one of the richest events on the Challenge Tour.

== Winners ==
Year	Winner	Score	To par	Margin of victory	Runners-up
2008	(Northern Ireland) Gareth Maybin	269	−19	6 strokes	(Sweden) Klas Eriksson (England) David Horsey (England) Gary Lockerbie (Scotland) Richie Ramsay (Austria) Roland Steiner
