= Pablo Larrazábal =

Spanish professional golfer (born 1983)

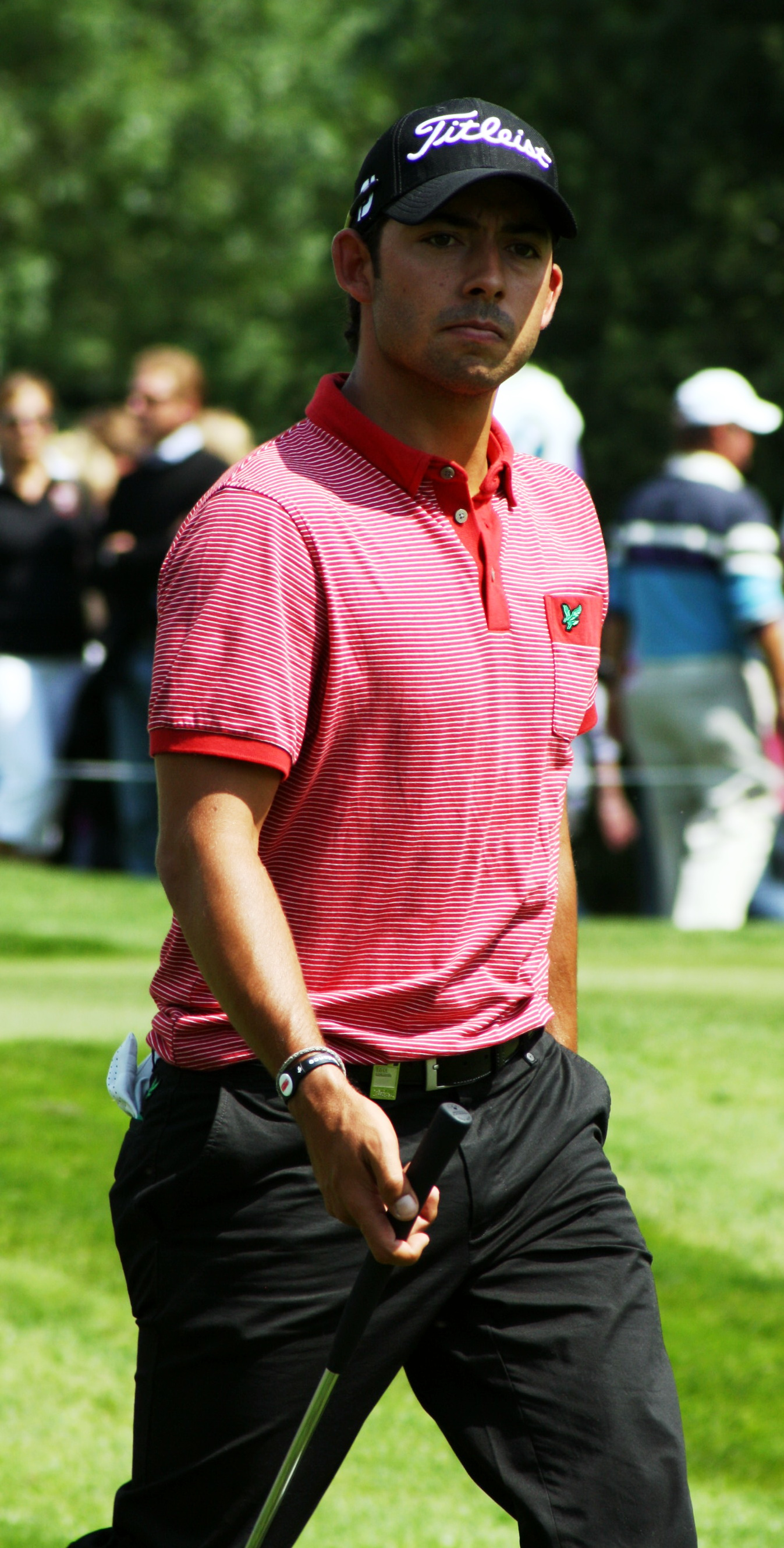
- Larrazábal at the 2011 BMW International Open

Personal information
- Full name: Pablo Larrazábal Corominas
- Nationality: Spain
- Born: 15 May 1983 (age 43) Barcelona, Spain
- Height: 1.78 m (5 ft 10 in)
- Weight: 79 kg (174 lb; 12.4 st)

Career
- Sport: Golf
- Turned professional: 2004
- Current tour: European Tour
- Former tours: Challenge Tour; LIV Golf
- Professional wins: 10
- Highest ranking: 50 (4 June 2023) (as of 25 October 2026)

Number of wins by tour
- European Tour: 9
- Sunshine Tour: 2
- Other: 1

Best results in major championships
- Masters Tournament: DNP
- PGA Championship: T45: 2011
- U.S. Open: CUT: 2014, 2023
- The Open Championship: T30: 2011

Achievements and awards
- Sir Henry Cotton Rookie of the Year: 2008

Pablo Larrazábal Corominas (born 15 May 1983) is a Spanish professional golfer who plays on the European Tour. He also played in the inaugural LIV Golf Invitational Series event at the Centurion Club.

== Early life ==
In 1983, Larrazábal was born in Barcelona, Spain. He attended high school in the United States and returned to Spain in 2002 with the intention of turning professional but his father made him work on the family fish farm in Cantabria to understand the value of money.

== Professional career ==
In 2004, Larrazábal turned professional. Larrazábal played in 8 events on the Challenge Tour in 2006 and made 7 cuts. His best finish came at the Vodafone Challenge where he was tied for seventh, his only top ten finish of the year. He earned €7,160 on the year and finished 138th on the money list.

Larrazábal played in 17 events in 2007 and made 10 cuts while recording two top 10 finishes and six top 25 finishes. His best finish came at the Postbank Challenge where he finished in fourth. He earned €21,596 on the year and finished 69th on the money list. Larrazábal finished in a tie for sixth at Q-School and earned his card for the European Tour's 2008 season.

In his rookie season on tour, Larrazábal played in 28 events and made 17 cuts. Larrazábal won his first title on the European Tour at the Open de France where he led after all four rounds; he had gained entry to the tournament through a 36-hole qualifier. He also had an impressive finish at the Madrid Masters where he finished in third. Larrazábal recorded three top 10 finishes and 7 top 25 finishes. He finished in 18th on the Order of Merit, earning €960,858. This propelled him to the Sir Henry Cotton Rookie of the Year award.

Larrazábal had an inconsistent year in 2009 on the European Tour, with only a single top ten finish, and three top 25 finishes. He finished ranked 86th on the inaugural Race to Dubai. The following season was not much better for Larrazábal, making 18 of 31 cuts and finishing in the top ten on three occasions. He earned €332,500 in the 2010 season and finished 88th in the Race to Dubai standings.

Larrazábal started the 2011 season with a fifth-place finish in India at the Avantha Masters before finishing third in his home country's national tournament, the Open de España finishing three strokes behind the winner Thomas Aiken. A month later he finished fourth at the Saab Wales Open shooting a 67 during the final round to move through the field and into the top five. In June 2011, Larrazábal won his second European Tour title at the BMW International Open in Munich beating compatriot Sergio García in a sudden death playoff. Both men entered the final round trailing by two strokes, but fired rounds of 68 to finish on sixteen under par. Larrazábal had a putt to win outright at the 72nd hole but that slipped by, allowing García to birdie the last to take them into a playoff. After both players made birdies at the 18th, on the first and second playoff holes, they advanced to the par three 12th and the par three 17th, where Larrazábal let two more ten footers slide by for the championship. However at the fifth extra hole, the par five 18th, García ran his eagle putt four feet past, with Larrazábal two feet away in three. García's birdie putt then lipped out and Larrazábal holed out for victory.

This win came three weeks after Larrazábal had missed out in a playoff himself in an Open Championship qualifier at Sunningdale, but the win has ensured himself of a place at the 2011 Open Championship at Royal St. George's. Larrazábal ended the season ranked 17th on the Race to Dubai, his highest finish to date.

Larrazábals best finishes in 2012 were a pair of tied for second places: at the Reale Seguros Open de España in May and at the KLM Open in September.

In January 2014, Larrazábal won the Abu Dhabi HSBC Golf Championship by one stroke over Rory McIlroy and Phil Mickelson. In a bizarre incident in April, Larrazábal was attacked by a swarm of hornets during the second round of the Maybank Malaysian Open and resorted to jumping into a lake to escape. He received around 20 stings, but still managed to card a round of 68.

In June 2015, Larrazábal won his second BMW International Open in Germany. This was his fourth career title on the European Tour.

In December, Larrazábal won the Alfred Dunhill Championship at Leopard Creek Country Club in South Africa by one stroke over Joel Sjöholm. This event was also co-sanctioned by the Sunshine Tour.

Larrazábal claimed his sixth European Tour victory in March at the MyGolfLife Open in South Africa. He beat Jordan Smith with a birdie at the second extra hole of a playoff after Adri Arnaus had been eliminated on the first playoff hole. A month later, at the ISPS Handa Championship in Spain, Larrazábal shot a final-round 62 to win by one shot ahead of Adrián Otaegui. It was his seventh European Tour win.

In April, Larrazábal won his eighth European Tour title at the Korea Championship by two strokes ahead of Marcus Helligkilde. In May, he won the KLM Open in the Netherlands, winning by two shots over Adrián Otaegui.

== Personal life ==
Larrazábal's older brother Alejandro won The Amateur Championship in 2002, with the teenage Pablo acting as caddy. Their Venezuelan father Gustavo and Catalan mother Elena both played golf to a high standard.

Larrazábal is a lifelong friend of former FC Barcelona player Andrés Iniesta, having attended La Masia together when they were younger.

== Awards and honors ==
In 2008, Larrazábal won the Sir Henry Cotton Rookie of the Year award.

== Professional wins (10) ==
=== European Tour wins (9) ===
No.	Date	Tournament	Winning score	Margin of victory	Runner(s)-up
1	29 Jun 2008	Open de France Alstom	−15 (65-70-67-67=269)	4 strokes	(Scotland) Colin Montgomerie
2	26 Jun 2011	BMW International Open	−16 (68-67-69-68=272)	Playoff	(Spain) Sergio García
3	19 Jan 2014	Abu Dhabi HSBC Golf Championship	−14 (69-70-68-67=274)	1 stroke	(Northern Ireland) Rory McIlroy, (United States) Phil Mickelson
4	28 Jun 2015	BMW International Open (2)	−17 (70-66-69-66=271)	1 stroke	(Sweden) Henrik Stenson
5	1 Dec 2019 (2020 season)	Alfred Dunhill Championship^{1}	−8 (66-69-70-75=280)	1 stroke	(Sweden) Joel Sjöholm
6	13 Mar 2022	MyGolfLife Open^{1}	−22 (63-65-71-67=266)	Playoff	(Spain) Adri Arnaus, (England) Jordan Smith
7	24 Apr 2022	ISPS Handa Championship in Spain	−15 (67-68-68-62=265)	1 stroke	(Spain) Adrián Otaegui
8	30 Apr 2023	Korea Championship^{2}	−12 (68-70-71-67=276)	2 strokes	(Denmark) Marcus Helligkilde
9	28 May 2023	KLM Open	−13 (66-73-67-69=275)	2 strokes	(Spain) Adrián Otaegui

^{1}Co-sanctioned by the Sunshine Tour
^{2}Co-sanctioned by the Korean Tour

European Tour playoff record (2–2)

No.	Year	Tournament	Opponent(s)	Result
1	2011	BMW International Open	(Spain) Sergio García	Won with birdie on fifth extra hole
2	2011	Johnnie Walker Championship at Gleneagles	(Denmark) Thomas Bjørn, (South Africa) George Coetzee, (England) Mark Foster, (Austria) Bernd Wiesberger	Bjørn won with birdie on fifth extra hole Foster eliminated by par on fourth hole Larrazábal eliminated by par on second hole Wiesberger eliminated by par on first hole
3	2022	MyGolfLife Open	(Spain) Adri Arnaus, (England) Jordan Smith	Won with birdie on second extra hole Arnaus eliminated by birdie on first hole
4	2025	Bapco Energies Bahrain Championship	(England) Dan Brown, (England) Laurie Canter	Canter won with birdie on first extra hole

=== Alps Tour wins (1) ===
No.	Date	Tournament	Winning score	Margin of victory	Runner-up
1	28 Apr 2012	Peugeot Alps de Barcelona	−16 (64-65-65=194)	4 strokes	(Spain) Ivó Giner

== Results in major championships ==
Results not in chronological order in 2020.

Tournament	2008	2009	2010	2011	2012	2013	2014	2015	2016	2017	2018
Masters Tournament											
U.S. Open							CUT				
The Open Championship	T70	CUT		T30	T45		CUT	CUT		CUT	
PGA Championship	CUT			T45	CUT	CUT	CUT	CUT		CUT	

Tournament	2019	2020	2021	2022	2023
Masters Tournament					
PGA Championship				CUT	T65
U.S. Open					CUT
The Open Championship		NT		CUT	CUT

Did not play

CUT = missed the half-way cut
"T" = tied
NT = No tournament due to COVID-19 pandemic

=== Summary ===
Tournament	Wins	2nd	3rd	Top-5	Top-10	Top-25	Events	Cuts made
Masters Tournament	0	0	0	0	0	0	0	0
PGA Championship	0	0	0	0	0	0	9	2
U.S. Open	0	0	0	0	0	0	2	0
The Open Championship	0	0	0	0	0	0	9	3
Totals	0	0	0	0	0	0	20	5

- Most consecutive cuts made – 3 (2011 Open Championship – 2012 Open Championship)
- Longest streak of top-10s – 0

== Results in World Golf Championships ==
Results not in chronological order before 2015.

Tournament	2008	2009	2010	2011	2012	2013	2014	2015	2016	2017	2018	2019	2020
Championship		79			T66					T72			64
Match Play							T33						NT^{1}
Invitational	76			74			T63	T50					
Champions				T20			T14						NT^{1}

^{1}Cancelled due to COVID-19 pandemic

Did not play

QF, R16, R32, R64 = Round in which player lost in match play
NT = no tournament
"T" = tied
Note that the HSBC Champions did not become a WGC event until 2009.

== Team appearances ==
Amateur

- Eisenhower Trophy (representing Spain): 2000
- European Boys' Team Championship (representing Spain): 2001
- European Youths' Team Championship (representing Spain): 2002

Professional

- World Cup (representing Spain): 2008
- Royal Trophy (representing Europe): 2009
- Seve Trophy (representing Continental Europe): 2011
- EurAsia Cup (representing Europe): 2014

== See also ==
- 2007 European Tour Qualifying School graduates
- List of golfers with most European Tour wins
