= Adrian Meronk =

Polish professional golfer (born 1993)

Personal information
- Nationality: Poland
- Born: 31 May 1993 (age 33) Hamburg, Germany
- Height: 1.97 m (6 ft 6 in)
- Weight: 90 kg (198 lb)

Career
- Sport: Golf
- College: East Tennessee State University
- Turned professional: 2016
- Current tours: European Tour; LIV Golf
- Former tours: Challenge Tour; Pro Golf Tour
- Professional wins: 7
- Highest ranking: 39 (21 January 2024) (as of 25 October 2026)

Number of wins by tour
- European Tour: 5
- PGA Tour of Australasia: 1
- Challenge Tour: 1
- LIV Golf: 1

Best results in major championships
- Masters Tournament: CUT: 2023, 2024
- PGA Championship: T40: 2023
- U.S. Open: CUT: 2021, 2023, 2024
- The Open Championship: T23: 2023

Achievements and awards
- European Tour Player of the Year: 2023

Adrian Meronk (born 31 May 1993) is a Polish professional golfer who plays on the European Tour and the LIV Golf League. He won the 2022 Horizon Irish Open, becoming the first Polish golfer to win on the European Tour.

== Early life ==
Meronk was born in Hamburg, Germany, and at the age of two his family returned to Poland. They settled in Pniewy, near Poznań, and lived there for ten years. He attended high school in Wrocław, prior to moving to the United States to study.

== Amateur career ==
Meronk attended East Tennessee State University from 2012 to 2016. Meronk represented Poland in the Eisenhower Trophy in 2012, 2014, 2016. In 2012 he was tied for 7th place as an individual. In 2016 Poland finished 8th with Meronk tied for 3rd place as an individual. He also played for Europe in the Arnold Palmer Cup in 2015 and 2016, being part of the winning team in 2016.

== Professional career ==
Meronk turned professional after the 2016 Eisenhower Trophy. He played on the Challenge Tour in 2017 and was runner-up in the Ras Al Khaimah Golf Challenge, losing in a playoff to Jens Dantorp. He finished the season 30th in the rankings. He played on the Challenge Tour again in 2018, finishing 48th in the rankings with just one top-10 finish.

Meronk had a good start to the 2019 Challenge Tour season. He tied for seventh place in his first two events and then solo third in the D+D Real Czech Challenge. In September at the Open de Portugal, Meronk had his first Challenge Tour win, finishing two strokes ahead of Sebastián García Rodríguez. He finished the 2019 season at fifth in the Challenge Tour rankings, which earned him status on the 2020 European Tour.

Meronk held the 54-hole lead at the Alfred Dunhill Championship in November 2020, but a final-round 76 dropped him into tied-second place, four shots behind the winner Christiaan Bezuidenhout.

In July 2022, Meronk won the Horizon Irish Open to become the first Pole to win on the European Tour. He played the final four holes in 4-under-par to beat Ryan Fox by three shots. In December 2022, Meronk won his second title on the European Tour at the ISPS Handa Australian Open in by five shots over Adam Scott.

In May 2023, Meronk won the DS Automobiles Italian Open at the Marco Simone Golf and Country Club in Rome. He shot a final-round 69 to win by one shot ahead of Romain Langasque. With this win and Meronk's consistent play on the European Tour in 2022 and 2023, it put him in contention to qualify for the 2023 Ryder Cup team in September. Meronk ultimately finished fifth on the European points list at the end of qualification at the Omega European Masters and missed out on automatically qualifying. He was also not selected as a wildcard pick, despite winning at the venue in which the Ryder Cup was played. Meronk said he was "shocked, sad and angry" to not be selected for the team. A month later, Meronk won the Estrella Damm N.A. Andalucía Masters in Spain, shooting 66-66 over the weekend to win by one shot ahead of Matti Schmid.

In January 2024, Meronk received the European Tour Player of the Year award for the 2023 season. Later that month, he signed with LIV Golf, joining Cleeks GC as part of the 2024 LIV Golf League. He won his first LIV Golf title at LIV Golf Riyadh in February 2025, finishing two shots ahead of runners-up Sebastian Munoz and Jon Rahm.

Meronk won the Alfred Dunhill Links Championship in October 2026. He shot a final-round 68 at the Old Course at St Andrews to win by two strokes over Casey Jarvis and Niklas Norgaard. This was his fifth European Tour title. Meronk said afterwards: "I never usually cry, but this one feels really special. I'm lost for words. I'm extremely happy and quite relieved."

== Amateur wins ==
- 2010 Polish Junior Championship, Polish Amateur
- 2011 Polish Junior Championship
- 2012 TOYA Polish Junior
- 2014 Polish Amateur, Inverness Intercollegiate, Wolfpack Intercollegiate (co-medalist)
- 2015 Bank of Tennessee Intercollegiate
- 2016 Southern Conference Championship

== Professional wins (7) ==
=== European Tour wins (5) ===
| No. | Date | Tournament | Winning score | Margin of victory | Runner(s)-up |
|---|---|---|---|---|---|
| 1 | 3 Jul 2022 | Horizon Irish Open | −20 (67-67-68-66=268) | 3 strokes | (New Zealand) Ryan Fox |
| 2 | 4 Dec 2022 (2023 season) | ISPS Handa Australian Open^{1} | −14 (73-66-63-66=268) | 5 strokes | (Australia) Adam Scott |
| 3 | 7 May 2023 | DS Automobiles Italian Open | −13 (68-68-66-69=271) | 1 stroke | (France) Romain Langasque |
| 4 | 22 Oct 2023 | Estrella Damm N.A. Andalucía Masters | −16 (72-68-66-66=272) | 1 stroke | (Germany) Matti Schmid |
| 5 | 4 Oct 2026 | Alfred Dunhill Links Championship | −20 (71-66-63-68=268) | 2 strokes | (South Africa) Casey Jarvis, (Denmark) Niklas Nørgaard |

^{1}Co-sanctioned by the PGA Tour of Australasia

=== Challenge Tour wins (1) ===
| No. | Date | Tournament | Winning score | Margin of victory | Runner-up |
|---|---|---|---|---|---|
| 1 | 15 Sep 2019 | Open de Portugal | −15 (67-72-68-66=273) | 2 strokes | (Spain) Sebastián García Rodríguez |

Challenge Tour playoff record (0–1)

| No. | Year | Tournament | Opponent | Result |
|---|---|---|---|---|
| 1 | 2017 | Ras Al Khaimah Golf Challenge | (Sweden) Jens Dantorp | Lost to eagle on first extra hole |

=== LIV Golf League wins (1) ===
| No. | Date | Tournament | Winning score | Margin of victory | Runners-up |
|---|---|---|---|---|---|
| 1 | 8 Feb 2025 | LIV Golf Riyadh | −17 (62-66-71=199) | 2 strokes | (Colombia) Sebastián Muñoz, (Spain) Jon Rahm |

== Results in major championships ==
| Tournament | 2021 | 2022 | 2023 | 2024 |
|---|---|---|---|---|
| Masters Tournament | | | CUT | CUT |
| PGA Championship | | | T40 | CUT |
| U.S. Open | CUT | | CUT | CUT |
| The Open Championship | | T42 | T23 | T50 |

Did not play

CUT = missed the half-way cut
"T" = tied

== Results in World Golf Championships ==
| Tournament | 2023 |
|---|---|
| Match Play | T17 |

"T" = Tied

== Team appearances ==
Amateur

- European Boys' Team Championship (representing Poland): 2008, 2009
- Eisenhower Trophy (representing Poland): 2012, 2014, 2016
- European Amateur Team Championship (representing Poland): 2010, 2015
- Arnold Palmer Cup (representing Europe): 2015, 2016 (winners)

Professional

- European Championships (representing Poland): 2018
- Hero Cup (representing Continental Europe): 2023 (winners)

== See also ==
- 2019 Challenge Tour graduates
- 2023 Race to Dubai dual card winners
