= Gareth Maybin =

Northern Irish professional golfer (born 1980)

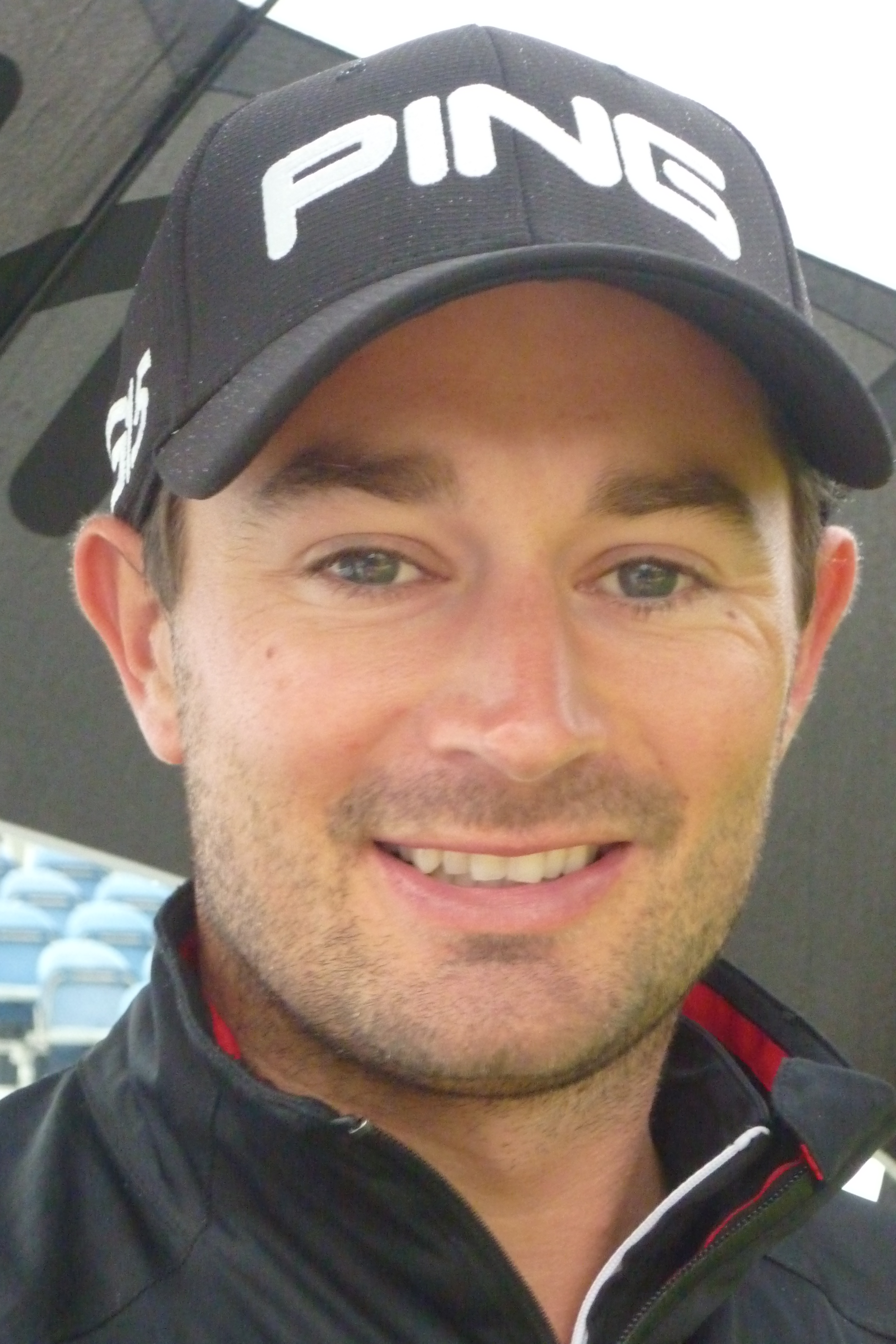

Personal information
- Nationality: Northern Ireland
- Born: 14 September 1980 (age 46) Belfast, Northern Ireland
- Height: 5 ft 9 in (1.75 m)
- Spouse: Liz (m. 2011)
- Children: 1

Career
- Sport: Golf
- College: University of South Alabama
- Turned professional: 2005
- Former tours: European Tour; Challenge Tour; NGA Hooters Tour
- Professional wins: 3
- Highest ranking: 84 (15 February 2009)

Number of wins by tour
- Challenge Tour: 1
- Other: 2

Best results in major championships
- Masters Tournament: DNP
- PGA Championship: DNP
- U.S. Open: T63: 2010
- The Open Championship: CUT: 2010, 2013

Gareth Maybin (born 14 September 1980) is a Northern Irish professional golfer.

== Career ==
Born in Belfast, Maybin turned professional in 2005 after completing a scholarship at the University of South Alabama. He remained in the United States and competed on the NGA Hooters Tour, where he finished fourth on the money list in his first season. He won two events on the tour between 2005 and 2007, and had several other top ten finishes.

In 2007, Maybin began to receive invitations to Challenge Tour tournaments in Europe, and after a series of strong finishes took up membership of this tour. The following year, he won the Qingdao Golf Open on his way to fourth place on the Challenge Tour money list, which gave him full exemption on the European Tour for 2009.

In his third event on the European Tour, Maybin lost in a playoff at the 2008 South African Open. This runner-up finish elevated him into the top 100 of the Official World Golf Rankings for the first time. Maybin finished the 2010 season in the top 40 on the Race to Dubai.

Maybin represented Ireland, alongside Michael Hoey at the 2007 Omega Mission Hills World Cup where they finished in 24th position.

Maybin announced his retirement from professional golf in 2017. He is now a full-time teaching professional at Galgorm Castle Golf Club.

== Professional wins (3) ==
=== Challenge Tour wins (1) ===
No.	Date	Tournament	Winning score	Margin of victory	Runners-up
1	14 Sep 2008	Qingdao Golf Open	−19 (62-67-72-68=269)	6 strokes	(Sweden) Klas Eriksson, (England) David Horsey, (England) Gary Lockerbie, (Scotland) Richie Ramsay, (Austria) Roland Steiner

=== NGA Hooters Tour wins (2) ===
No.	Date	Tournament	Winning score	Margin of victory	Runner-up
1	3 Jul 2005	Base Camp Realty-Chesdin Landing Open	−17 (66-68-68-69=271)	2 strokes	(Colombia) Camilo Benedetti
2	28 May 2006	Quicksilver Golf Classic	−15 (69-66-69-69=273)	3 strokes	(United States) Grover Justice

== Playoff record ==
European Tour playoff record (0–1)

No.	Year	Tournament	Opponent	Result
1	2008	South African Open Championship	(South Africa) Richard Sterne	Lost to birdie on first extra hole

== Results in major championships ==
Tournament	2010	2011	2012	2013
U.S. Open	T63			
The Open Championship	CUT			CUT

Did not play

CUT = missed the half-way cut
"T" = tied
Note: Maybin never played in the Masters Tournament or the PGA Championship.

== Team appearances ==
Amateur

- Palmer Cup (representing Europe): 2004 (winners)
- European Amateur Team Championship (representing Ireland): 2005

Professional

- World Cup (representing Ireland): 2007

== See also ==
- 2008 Challenge Tour graduates
