= Singapore Classic =

Porsche Singapore Classic
Tournament information
- Location: Singapore
- Established: 2023
- Courses: Laguna National Golf Resort Club (Classic Course)
- Par: 72
- Length: 7,420 yards (6,780 m)
- Tour: European Tour
- Format: Stroke play
- Prize fund: US$2,500,000
- Month played: March

Tournament record score
- Aggregate: 269 Ockie Strydom (2023)
- To par: −19 as above

Current champion
- (England) Richard Mansell

Location map
- Location in Singapore

The Singapore Classic is a professional golf tournament played on the European Tour, held at Laguna National Golf & Country Club, in Singapore.

The tournament was announced in June 2022 and was the first time that the European Tour has visited Singapore since the 2014 Championship at Laguna National, played at the same venue.

Ockie Strydom won the inaugural event, shooting a final-round 63 to beat Sami Välimäki by one shot.

In January 2024, it was confirmed that Porsche would become the title sponsor for the 2024 event onwards.

== Controversy ==
The inaugural staging of the tournament created mild controversy as it was the first time that the European Tour had staged a tournament in the Southeast Asian region without co-sanctioning the event with the Asian Tour. This was mainly due to the European Tour and Asian Tour's partnership having ended due to the European Tour siding with the PGA Tour, and the Asian Tour siding with LIV Golf.

== Winners ==
Year	Winner	Score	To par	Margin of victory	Runner-up
Porsche Singapore Classic
2025	(England) Richard Mansell	200 (Note: Shortened to 54 holes due to weather.)	−16	1 stroke	(Japan) Keita Nakajima
2024	(Sweden) Jesper Svensson	271	−17	Playoff	(Thailand) Kiradech Aphibarnrat
Singapore Classic
2023	(South Africa) Ockie Strydom	269	−19	1 stroke	(Finland) Sami Välimäki
