= 2025 Open Championship =

Golf tournament

153rd Open Championship

Tournament information
- Dates: 17–20 July 2025
- Location: Portrush, County Antrim, Northern Ireland; 55.200°N 6.635°W
- Courses: Royal Portrush Golf Club; Dunluce Links
- Organized by: The R&A
- Tours: DP World Tour; PGA Tour; Japan Golf Tour

Statistics
- Par: 71
- Length: 7,381 yards (6,749 m)
- Field: 156 players, 70 after cut
- Cut: 143 (+1)
- Prize fund: $17,000,000
- Winner's share: $3,100,000

Champion
- (United States) Scottie Scheffler
- 267 (−17)
- Location in the United Kingdom Location in Ireland Location in Northern Ireland

The 2025 Open Championship, officially the 153rd Open Championship, was a golf tournament played from 17 to 20 July 2025 at Royal Portrush Golf Club in County Antrim, Northern Ireland. The third Open Championship to be held at Portrush, it was the fourth of the four men's major golf championships held in 2025.

Scottie Scheffler recorded four sub-70 rounds, for a total of 267, to win his first Open and fourth major by four strokes over Harris English.

== Organisation ==
The 2025 Open Championship is organised by the R&A, and is included in the PGA Tour, European Tour, and Japan Golf Tour calendars under the major championships category. The tournament is a 72-hole (4 rounds) stroke play competition held over four days, with 18 holes played each day. Play will be in groups of three for the first two days, and groups of two in the final two days. Groupings for the first two days are decided by the organizers, with each group having one morning and one afternoon tee time. On the final two days, players will tee off in reverse order of aggregate score, with the leaders last. After 36 holes there will be a cut, after which the top 70 and ties progress through to compete in the third and fourth rounds. In the event of a tie for the lowest score after four rounds, a three-hole aggregate playoff will be held to determine the winner; this will be followed by sudden-death extra holes if necessary until a winner emerges.

== Venue ==
The 2025 event was the third Open Championship played at Royal Portrush; the club had previously hosted in 1951 and 2019.

=== Card of the course ===
Dunluce Links – Championship tees

Hole	Name	Yards	Par	Hole	Name	Yards	Par
1	Hughie's	420	4	10	Himalayas	450	4
2	Giant's Grave	575	5	11	P. G. Stevenson's	475	4
3	Islay	176	3	12	Dhu Varren	532	5
4	Fred Daly's	502	4	13	Feather Bed	199	3
5	White Rocks	372	4	14	Causeway	466	4
6	Harry Colt's	193	3	15	Skerries	429	4
7	Curran Point	607	5	16	Calamity Corner	236	3
8	Dunluce	434	4	17	Purgatory	409	4
9	Tavern	432	4	18	Babington's	474	4
Out		3,711	36	In		3,670	35
Source:				Total		7,381	71

== Field ==
The Open Championship field is made up of 156 players, who gained entry through various exemption criteria and qualifying tournaments. The criteria include past Open champions, recent major winners, top ranked players in the world rankings and from the leading world tours, and winners and high finishers from various designated tournaments, including the Open Qualifying Series; the winners of designated amateur events, including The Amateur Championship and U.S. Amateur, also gained exemption provided they remain an amateur. Anyone not qualifying via exemption, and had a handicap of 0.4 or lower, can gain entry through regional and final qualifying events.

== Round summaries ==
=== First round ===
Thursday, 17 July 2025

Two-time Open champion Pádraig Harrington hit the opening tee shot at 6:35 a.m. and made the first birdie of the championship by holing an 18-foot (5.5 m) putt on the first green. He ultimately shot a four-over 75. The afternoon half of the draw had more favourable conditions, with a 72.4 scoring average, around 1.3 strokes easier than those in the morning draw.

Five players shot 67 (–4) to share the lead: Christiaan Bezuidenhout, Harris English, Matt Fitzpatrick, Li Haotong, and Jacob Skov Olesen. The five-way tie for first was the largest since 1938, when six shared the first-round lead. World number one Scottie Scheffler was among four players at 68, a stroke behind, and ten were at 69. Rory McIlroy, born in nearby Holywood, and 2019 champion Shane Lowry were among twelve at 70 (–1), tied for twentieth. Scottish Open winner Chris Gotterup was at one-over 72 with 24 others, tied for 45th place.

Place	Player	Score	To par
T1	(South Africa) Christiaan Bezuidenhout	67	−4
T1	(United States) Harris English	67	−4
T1	(England) Matt Fitzpatrick	67	−4
T1	(China) Li Haotong	67	−4
T1	(Denmark) Jacob Skov Olesen	67	−4
T6	(England) Tyrrell Hatton	68	−3
T6	(England) Matthew Jordan	68	−3
T6	(Thailand) Sadom Kaewkanjana	68	−3
T6	(United States) Scottie Scheffler	68	−3
T10	(United States) Rickie Fowler	69	−2
T10	(United States) Lucas Glover	69	−2
T10	(United States) Brian Harman	69	−2
T10	(Denmark) Nicolai Højgaard	69	−2
T10	(Denmark) Rasmus Højgaard	69	−2
T10	(South Korea) Tom Kim	69	−2
T10	(United States) Maverick McNealy	69	−2
T10	(England) Aaron Rai	69	−2
T10	(England) Justin Rose	69	−2
T10	(England) Lee Westwood	69	−2

=== Second round ===
Friday, 18 July 2025

Scottie Scheffler shot the low round of the week to that point with a seven-under-par 64 to take the lead by one shot over Matt Fitzpatrick. Scheffler became the first world number one to hold the 36-hole lead at the Open Championship since Tiger Woods in 2006. 2023 champion Brian Harman shot a bogey-free six-under-par 65 to sit two shots back of the lead alongside first round co-leader Li Haotong.

Exactly 70 players made the cut in the top 70 and ties format. The cutline was 143 (+1), the same mark as the previous playing of the event at Royal Portrush in 2019. Notables to miss the cut included 2021 champion Collin Morikawa, 2022 champion Cameron Smith, and 5-time major champion Brooks Koepka. None of the nine amateurs in the field made the cut, which meant that the silver medal would not be awarded for the first time since 2019.

Place	Player	Score	To par
1	(United States) Scottie Scheffler	68–64=132	−10
2	(England) Matt Fitzpatrick	67–66=133	−9
T3	(United States) Brian Harman	69–65=134	−8
T3	(China) Li Haotong	67–67=134	−8
T5	(United States) Harris English	67–70=137	−5
T5	(United States) Chris Gotterup	72–65=137	−5
T5	(England) Tyrrell Hatton	68–69=137	−5
T5	(Denmark) Rasmus Højgaard	69–68=137	−5
T5	(Scotland) Robert MacIntyre	71–66=137	−5
T10	(United States) Tony Finau	70–68=138	−4
T10	(Denmark) Nicolai Højgaard	69–69=138	−4

=== Third round ===
Saturday, 19 July 2025

Scottie Scheffler, who was looking to win his second major of the season, shot a bogey-free, four-under 67 and established a four-shot lead. This was Scheffler's fourth 54-hole lead in a major championship; he had converted each of the previous three into wins. Li Haotong, who was ranked 111th in the Official World Golf Ranking entering the week, shot two-under 69 to put himself in solo-second heading into the final round. 2022 U.S. Open champion Matt Fitzpatrick shot even-par 71 to fall into third place.

Rory McIlroy shot five-under 66 to put himself into a tie for fourth place. On the 11th hole of his round, he hit a shot out of the rough which revealed a hidden ball buried beneath his ball. He ultimately bogied the 11th, but bounced back with a 56-foot eagle putt on the par-5 12th. Harris English, Chris Gotterup and Tyrrell Hatton all shot rounds of three-under 68 to join McIlroy in fourth place. Defending champion Xander Schauffele shot five-under 66 to sit in eighth place. Brian Harman made a double-bogey on his first hole en route to a two-over 73. Twin brothers Nicolai Højgaard and Rasmus Højgaard also tied for ninth place entering the final round, at six-under-par for the tournament.

John Parry recorded an ace on the 13th hole. It was the first hole-in-one made by any player in the tournament. The scoring average was 69.97, as the winds were calm and the greens had been softened by rain in the previous days. This was first round of the Open Championship with a scoring average below 70 since the final round of the 2022 Open Championship (69.67).

Place	Player	Score	To par
1	(United States) Scottie Scheffler	68–64–67=199	−14
2	(China) Li Haotong	67–67–69=203	−10
3	(England) Matt Fitzpatrick	67–66–71=204	−9
T4	(United States) Harris English	67–70–68=205	−8
T4	(United States) Chris Gotterup	72–65–68=205	−8
T4	(England) Tyrrell Hatton	68–69–68=205	−8
T4	(Northern Ireland) Rory McIlroy	70–69–66=205	−8
8	(United States) Xander Schauffele	71–69–66=206	−7
T9	(United States) Brian Harman	69–65–73=207	−6
T9	(United States) Russell Henley	72–70–65=207	−6
T9	(Denmark) Nicolai Højgaard	69–69–69=207	−6
T9	(Denmark) Rasmus Højgaard	69–68–70=207	−6
T9	(Scotland) Robert MacIntyre	71–66–70=207	−6

=== Final round ===
Sunday, 20 July 2025

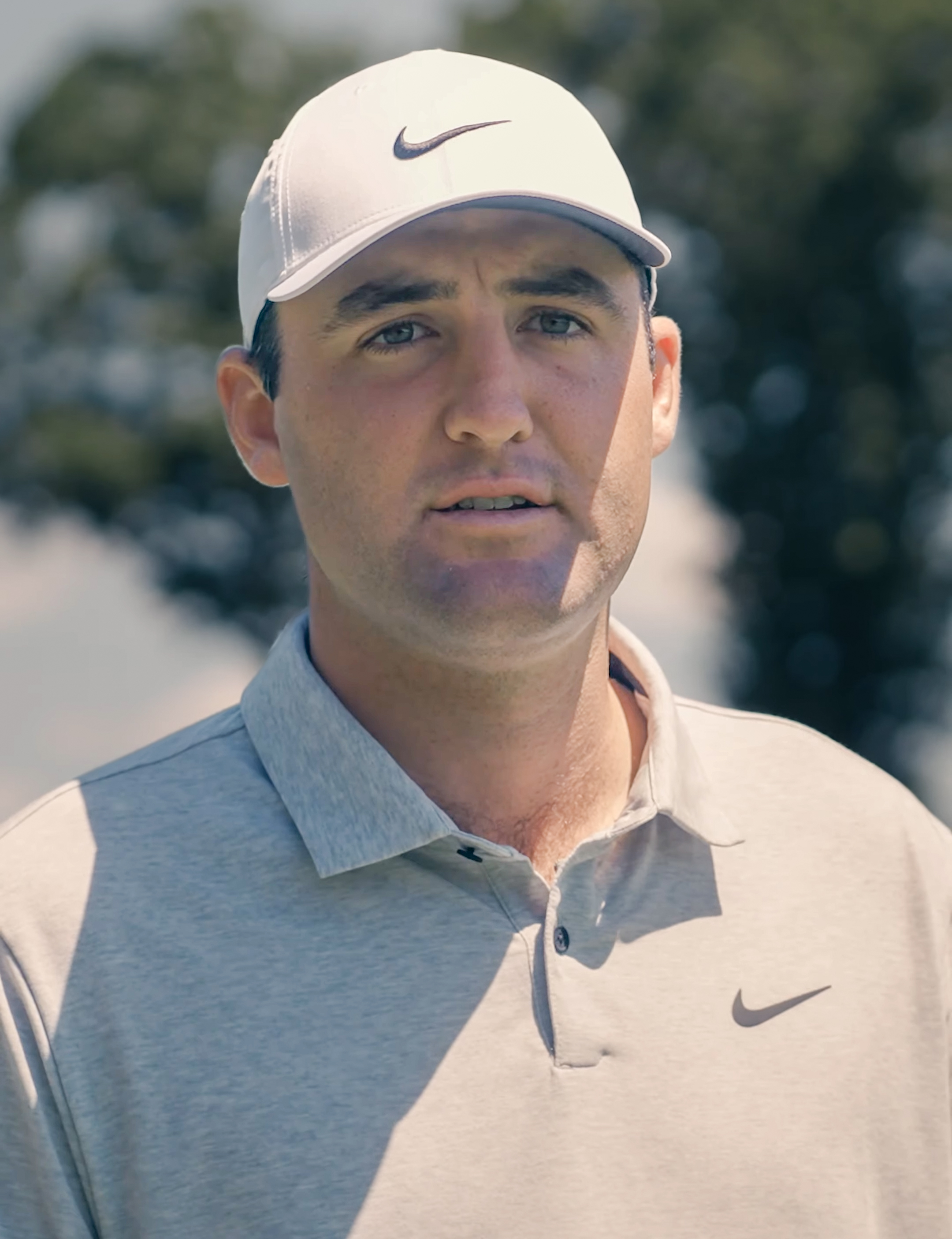
Scottie Scheffler won his first Open title and fourth major.

==== Summary ====
Scottie Scheffler shot his fourth consecutive round in the 60s with a three-under 68 to maintain his four-shot advantage and win his first Open Championship and second major championship of the year.

Scheffler, who began the round four ahead of Haotong Li, hit his approach on the par-4 first hole to within two feet for a birdie. He made two more birdies on the front-nine and led by as many as seven shots before finding a bunker off the tee on the eighth hole. His second shot hit the lip and stayed in the bunker, and Scheffler ended up with a double bogey, his first bogey or worse since the 11th hole in the second round, to see his lead cut to four.

Scheffler responded by hitting his approach shot within five feet on the ninth hole for a birdie, taking a five-shot lead into the back-nine. He then got up-and-down from off the green for another birdie on the par-5 12th to reach 17-under and made par on his last six holes.

No one could get closer to four shots during the round. Scheffler's playing partner, Li, bogeyed two of his first four holes. Five players were tied for second place at 10-under at one point on the front-nine. Chris Gotterup made birdie at the ninth to reach 11-under, while Li made a 27-foot putt from off the green for birdie at the 11th. Gotterup also birdied the 12th, while Harris English holed a 33-foot eagle putt on the same hole to reach 11-under.

English also made a 42-foot birdie putt at the par-3 16th, then birdied the 17th to shoot a five-under 66 and finish at 13-under for the tournament, the second time he had finished runner-up to Scheffler in a major during the year. Gotterup, who only got into the tournament by winning the Genesis Scottish Open the previous week and was playing on his 26th birthday, parred his last five holes to finish at 12-under and alone in third place.

Li double-bogeyed the 14th before birdies at the 15th and 17th brought him back to 11-under and a tie for fourth place with Wyndham Clark and Matt Fitzpatrick. Hometown favorite Rory McIlroy was two-under on his front-nine and tied for second until a double bogey at the 10th. He rebounded with two more birdies for a two-under round of 69 and ended up at 10-under, in a tie for seventh place.

Bryson DeChambeau shot a final round 64, tying the best round of the tournament. DeChambeau finished in a tie for tenth.

==== Final leaderboard ====
Champion
(a) = amateur
(c) = past champion

Top 10
Place	Player	Score	To par	Money ($)
1	(United States) Scottie Scheffler	68–64–67–68=267	−17	3,100,000
2	(United States) Harris English	67–70–68–66=271	−13	1,759,000
3	(United States) Chris Gotterup	72–65–68–67=272	−12	1,128,000
T4	(United States) Wyndham Clark	76–66–66–65=273	−11	730,667
T4	(England) Matt Fitzpatrick	67–66–71–69=273	−11	730,667
T4	(China) Li Haotong	67–67–69–70=273	−11	730,667
T7	(Scotland) Robert MacIntyre	71–66–70–67=274	−10	451,833
T7	(Northern Ireland) Rory McIlroy (c)	70–69–66–69=274	−10	451,833
T7	(United States) Xander Schauffele (c)	71–69–66–68=274	−10	451,833
T10	(Canada) Corey Conners	74–69–66–66=275	−9	304,650
T10	(United States) Bryson DeChambeau	78–65–68–64=275	−9	304,650
T10	(United States) Brian Harman (c)	69–65–73–68=275	−9	304,650
T10	(United States) Russell Henley	72–70–65–68=275	−9	304,650

Leaderboard below the top 10
Place	Player	Score	To par	Money ($)
T14	(United States) Rickie Fowler	69–72–70–65=276	−8	240,000
T14	(Denmark) Nicolai Højgaard	69–69–69–69=276	−8	240,000
T16	(England) Tommy Fleetwood	73–68–69–67=277	−7	185,257
T16	(England) Tyrrell Hatton	68–69–68–72=277	−7	185,257
T16	(Denmark) Rasmus Højgaard	69–68–70–70=277	−7	185,257
T16	(Japan) Hideki Matsuyama	74–69–68–66=277	−7	185,257
T16	(England) John Parry	72–71–67–67=277	−7	185,257
T16	(England) Justin Rose	69–71–68–69=277	−7	185,257
T16	(Sweden) Jesper Svensson	71–72–68–66=277	−7	185,257
T23	(Sweden) Ludvig Åberg	73–67–68–70=278	−6	138,040
T23	(United States) Lucas Glover	69–72–68–69=278	−6	138,040
T23	(United States) Dustin Johnson	73–69–67–69=278	−6	138,040
T23	(United States) Maverick McNealy	69–74–69–66=278	−6	138,040
T23	(United States) J. J. Spaun	73–69–68–68=278	−6	138,040
T28	(England) Harry Hall	73–67–68–71=279	−5	119,950
T28	(Finland) Oliver Lindell	72–68–68–71=279	−5	119,950
T30	(United States) Daniel Berger	72–70–70–68=280	−4	104,850
T30	(United States) Akshay Bhatia	73–68–70–69=280	−4	104,850
T30	(United States) Keegan Bradley	72–67–70–71=280	−4	104,850
T30	(Norway) Kristoffer Reitan	72–68–68–72=280	−4	104,850
T34	(South Africa) Christiaan Bezuidenhout	67–73–69–72=281	−3	86,517
T34	(Spain) Sergio García	70–73–70–68=281	−3	86,517
T34	(Spain) Jon Rahm	70–72–69–70=281	−3	86,517
T34	(England) Aaron Rai	69–72–71–69=281	−3	86,517
T34	(United States) Justin Thomas	72–69–69–71=281	−3	86,517
T34	(England) Lee Westwood	69–70–69–73=281	−3	86,517
T40	(Japan) Takumi Kanaya	71–72–69–70=282	−2	68,340
T40	(England) Nathan Kimsey	71–72–68–71=282	−2	68,340
T40	(United States) Jason Kokrak	71–70–71–70=282	−2	68,340
T40	(Republic of Ireland) Shane Lowry (c)	70–72–74–66=282	−2	68,340
T40	(United States) Jordan Spieth (c)	73–69–72–68=282	−2	68,340
T45	(United States) Sam Burns	70–69–72–72=283	−1	50,463
T45	(Belgium) Thomas Detry	72–71–70–70=283	−1	50,463
T45	(England) Matthew Jordan	68–72–73–70=283	−1	50,463
T45	(South Africa) Thriston Lawrence	73–70–68–72=283	−1	50,463
T45	(England) Jordan Smith	71–68–72–72=283	−1	50,463
T45	(Sweden) Henrik Stenson (c)	75–68–69–71=283	−1	50,463
T45	(England) Matt Wallace	73–69–66–75=283	−1	50,463
T52	(South Korea) Im Sung-jae	71–71–67–75=284	E	44,000
T52	(Australia) Marc Leishman	73–68–68–75=284	E	44,000
T52	(France) Adrien Saddier	72–71–72–69=284	E	44,000
T52	(Austria) Sepp Straka	72–71–70–71=284	E	44,000
T56	(United States) Tony Finau	70–68–72–75=285	+1	42,333
T56	(United States) Phil Mickelson (c)	70–72–76–67=285	+1	42,333
T56	(Venezuela) Jhonattan Vegas	72–70–70–73=285	+1	42,333
T59	(United States) Justin Leonard (c)	70–73–70–73=286	+2	41,550
T59	(France) Antoine Rozner	72–70–73–71=286	+2	41,550
T61	(South Africa) Dean Burmester	71–71–76–69=287	+3	41,100
T61	(France) Romain Langasque	71–71–72–73=287	+3	41,100
T63	(Norway) Viktor Hovland	73–69–73–73=288	+4	40,280
T63	(United States) Ryggs Johnston	74–66–74–74=288	+4	40,280
T63	(Japan) Riki Kawamoto	72–70–78–68=288	+4	40,280
T63	(Italy) Francesco Molinari (c)	72–71–71–74=288	+4	40,280
T63	(United States) Andrew Novak	71–72–74–71=288	+4	40,280
68	(Denmark) Jacob Skov Olesen	67–76–73–74=290	+6	39,400
69	(Germany) Matti Schmid	73–70–79–70=292	+8	39,100
70	(Sweden) Sebastian Söderberg	73–70–75–77=295	+11	38,900
CUT	(Australia) Jason Day	73–71=144	+2	
CUT	(New Zealand) Ryan Fox	75–69=144	+2	
CUT	(United States) Ben Griffin	74–70=144	+2	
CUT	(New Zealand) Daniel Hillier	71–73=144	+2	
CUT	(Japan) Rikuya Hoshino	74–70=144	+2	
CUT	(Italy) Matteo Manassero	73–71=144	+2	
CUT	(Chile) Joaquín Niemann	70–74=144	+2	
CUT	(United States) Justin Suh	73–71=144	+2	
CUT	(Scotland) Cameron Adam (a)	73–72=145	+3	
CUT	(Denmark) John Axelsen	70–75=145	+3	
CUT	(England) George Bloor	73–72=145	+3	
CUT	(United States) Brian Campbell	73–72=145	+3	
CUT	(United States) Patrick Cantlay	73–72=145	+3	
CUT	(United States) Ethan Fang (a)	75–70=145	+3	
CUT	(United States) Max Greyserman	78–67=145	+3	
CUT	(France) Julien Guerrier	73–72=145	+3	
CUT	(Spain) Ángel Hidalgo	70–75=145	+3	
CUT	(United States) Zach Johnson (c)	70–75=145	+3	
CUT	(South Korea) Kim Si-woo	74–71=145	+3	
CUT	(South Korea) Tom Kim	69–76=145	+3	
CUT	(United States) Denny McCarthy	74–71=145	+3	
CUT	(United States) Matt McCarty	71–74=145	+3	
CUT	(Northern Ireland) Tom McKibbin	72–73=145	+3	
CUT	(Mexico) Carlos Ortiz	75–70=145	+3	
CUT	(Canada) Taylor Pendrith	75–70=145	+3	
CUT	(Australia) Elvis Smylie	75–70=145	+3	
CUT	(Canada) Nick Taylor	77–68=145	+3	
CUT	(Taiwan) Kevin Yu	79–66=145	+3	
CUT	(United States) John Catlin	78–68=146	+4	
CUT	(United States) Stewart Cink (c)	75–71=146	+4	
CUT	(Colombia) Nico Echavarría	72–74=146	+4	
CUT	(England) O. J. Farrell	74–72=146	+4	
CUT	(Australia) Lucas Herbert	74–72=146	+4	
CUT	(United States) Michael Kim	74–72=146	+4	
CUT	(South Africa) Dylan Naidoo	74–72=146	+4	
CUT	(Denmark) Niklas Nørgaard	77–69=146	+4	
CUT	(Denmark) Thorbjørn Olesen	72–74=146	+4	
CUT	(England) Marco Penge	74–72=146	+4	
CUT	(Sweden) Jesper Sandborg	72–74=146	+4	
CUT	(South Korea) Song Young-han	73–73=146	+4	
CUT	(United States) Cameron Young	74–72=146	+4	
CUT	(Scotland) Daniel Young	75–71=146	+4	
CUT	(South Korea) An Byeong-hun	76–71=147	+5	
CUT	(United States) Bud Cauley	72–75=147	+5	
CUT	(Thailand) Sadom Kaewkanjana	68–79=147	+5	
CUT	(United States) Chris Kirk	73–74=147	+5	
CUT	(Australia) Min Woo Lee	74–73=147	+5	
CUT	(South Africa) Shaun Norris	72–75=147	+5	
CUT	(France) Matthieu Pavon	76–71=147	+5	
CUT	(South Africa) Aldrich Potgieter	70–77=147	+5	
CUT	(United States) Patrick Reed	77–70=147	+5	
CUT	(England) Laurie Canter	74–74=148	+6	
CUT	(Northern Ireland) Darren Clarke (c)	75–73=148	+6	
CUT	(Cayman Islands) Justin Hastings (a)	74–74=148	+6	
CUT	(Germany) Stephan Jäger	72–76=148	+6	
CUT	(Czech Republic) Filip Jakubčík (a)	75–73=148	+6	
CUT	(England) Curtis Knipes	73–75=148	+6	
CUT	(South Africa) Louis Oosthuizen (c)	77–71=148	+6	
CUT	(United States) Davis Thompson	73–75=148	+6	
CUT	(England) Dan Brown	76–73=149	+7	
CUT	(South Africa) Darren Fichardt	78–71=149	+7	
CUT	(Canada) Mackenzie Hughes	79–70=149	+7	
CUT	(United States) Brooks Koepka	75–74=149	+7	
CUT	(United States) Collin Morikawa (c)	75–74=149	+7	
CUT	(United States) J. T. Poston	72–77=149	+7	
CUT	(United States) Sahith Theegala	75–74=149	+7	
CUT	(England) Frazer Jones (a)	77–73=150	+8	
CUT	(Australia) Curtis Luck	80–70=150	+8	
CUT	(Australia) Ryan Peake	77–73=150	+8	
CUT	(Australia) Cameron Smith (c)	72–78=150	+8	
CUT	(Estonia) Richard Teder (a)	74–76=150	+8	
CUT	(South Africa) Justin Walters	73–77=150	+8	
CUT	(China) Sampson Zheng	77–73=150	+8	
CUT	(Japan) Mikiya Akutsu	78–73=151	+9	
CUT	(France) Martin Couvra	78–73=151	+9	
CUT	(Republic of Ireland) Pádraig Harrington (c)	75–76=151	+9	
CUT	(Japan) Shugo Imahira	76–75=151	+9	
CUT	(United States) Davis Riley	77–74=151	+9	
CUT	(Australia) Adam Scott	72–79=151	+9	
CUT	(Scotland) Connor Graham (a)	73–79=152	+10	
CUT	(England) Sebastian Cave (a)	76–77=153	+11	
CUT	(United States) Tom Hoge	81–73=154	+12	
CUT	(Italy) Guido Migliozzi	77–77=154	+12	
CUT	(South Korea) K. J. Choi	81–74=155	+13	
CUT	(South Africa) Daniel van Tonder	79–77=156	+14	
CUT	(South Africa) Bryan Newman (a)	82–75=157	+15	

==== Scorecard ====
Hole	1	2	3	4	5	6	7	8	9	10	11	12	13	14	15	16	17	18
Par	4	5	3	4	4	3	5	4	4	4	4	5	3	4	4	3	4	4
(United States) Scheffler	−15	−15	−15	−16	−17	−17	−17	−15	−16	−16	−16	−17	−17	−17	−17	−17	−17	−17
(United States) English	−8	−9	−9	−9	−9	−9	−9	−10	−10	−10	−9	−11	−11	−11	−11	−12	−13	−13
(United States) Gotterup	−8	−8	−8	−9	−9	−9	−10	−10	−11	−11	−10	−11	−12	−12	−12	−12	−12	−12
(United States) Clark	−5	−4	−4	−4	−5	−5	−6	−7	−8	−7	−8	−9	−9	−10	−10	−10	−11	−11
(England) Fitzpatrick	−9	−9	−8	−8	−9	−8	−9	−10	−10	−10	−10	−10	−10	−10	−9	−10	−11	−11
(China) Li	−11	−10	−10	−9	−10	−10	−10	−10	−11	−10	−11	−11	−11	−9	−10	−10	−11	−11

Cumulative tournament scores, relative to par

Eagle	Birdie	Bogey	Double bogey
