= 2024 Challenge Tour graduates =

This is a list of players who graduated from the Challenge Tour in 2024.

Both Rasmus Neergaard-Petersen and John Parry earned immediate promotion to the European Tour during the 2024 season by winning three times on the Challenge Tour. Neergaard-Petersen finished 105th on the Race to Dubai, obtaining a higher exemption category for the 2025 European Tour season than he had from his Challenge Tour ranking; Robin Williams, who finished 14th in the Challenge Tour rankings, similarly obtained a higher exemption category through his European Tour performance as a non-member. Because of this, Neergaard-Petersen and Williams did not count against the 20 Challenge Tour graduates, and the players who finished 21st and 22nd in the rankings were given European Tour cards.

Andreas Halvorsen, who finished 27th in points with a total of 645 despite playing in only 13 of the 29 events, was given a medical extension of six Challenge Tour starts in 2025 to earn 40 points and a promotion to the European Tour for the remainder of its 2025 season. He reached the goal in his third start, on 16 March 2025.

		2024 Challenge Tour		2025 European Tour				
Player		Points rank	Points	Starts	Cuts made	Best finish	Points rank	Points
(Denmark)	Rasmus Neergaard-Petersen^{†}	1	1,826	24	17	2	15	2,212.52
(England)	John Parry	2	1,595	32	23	Win	11	2,538.05
(Finland)	Oliver Lindell*	3	1,497	29	24	7/T7	42	1,253.49
(Spain)	Ángel Ayora*	4	1,488	31	26	T5 (x3)	20	1,858.78
(Denmark)	Hamish Brown*	5	1,477	26	12	T8	136	341.89
(Republic of Ireland)	Conor Purcell*	6	1,309	25	11	T15	150	259.70
(Norway)	Kristoffer Reitan	7	1,095	31	24	Win	8	2,762.05
(Sweden)	Joakim Lagergren	8	1,055	28	18	2 (x2)	24	1,692.22
(England)	Jack Senior	9	1,033	28	16	T4	101	541.46
(Spain)	Joel Moscatel*	10	996	30	12	T16	158	234.09
(Sweden)	Mikael Lindberg	11	910	29	16	T4	67	826.75
(France)	Alexander Lévy	12	902	26	13	T9	140	319.14
(France)	Benjamin Hébert	13	888	25	10	T11	132	379.32
(South Africa)	Robin Williams^{†}	14	885	32	15	T7	131	385.29
(South Africa)	Deon Germishuys	15	848	25	7	3	135	356.38
(Sweden)	Björn Åkesson	16	820	25	8	T12	164	202.31
(France)	Martin Couvra*	17	808	28	17	Win	19	1,978.95
(England)	Brandon Robinson-Thompson*	18	807	30	19	3	51	1,113.59
(Finland)	Tapio Pulkkanen	19	732	25	12	7	125	435.62
(France)	Pierre Pineau^{†}	20	716	26	5	T19	181	118.68
(Germany)	Nicolai von Dellingshausen	21	689	31	18	Win	37	1,343.48
(Denmark)	Lucas Bjerregaard	22	685	24	9	T8	145	291.25

*European Tour rookie in 2025
^{†}First-time full member, but ineligible for Rookie of the Year award
The player retained his European Tour card for 2025 (finished inside the top 115).
The player did not retain his European Tour card for 2025, but retained conditional status (finished between 116 and 151, inclusive).
The player did not retain his European Tour card for 2025 (finished outside the top 152).

== Wins on the European Tour in 2025 ==
No.	Date	Player	Tournament	Winning score	Margin of victory	Runner(s)-up
1	22 Dec 2024	(England) John Parry	AfrAsia Bank Mauritius Open	−14 (70-69-71-64=274)	2 strokes	(South Africa) Christo Lamprecht (South Africa) Dylan Naidoo
2	11 May 2025	(France) Martin Couvra	Turkish Airlines Open	−17 (65-66-72-64=267)	2 strokes	(Spain) Jorge Campillo (China) Li Haotong
3	25 May	(Norway) Kristoffer Reitan	Soudal Open	−13 (71-66-72-62=271)	Playoff	(Scotland) Ewen Ferguson (Netherlands) Darius van Driel
4	1 Jun	(Germany) Nicolai von Dellingshausen	Austrian Alpine Open	−19 (65-66-65-65=261)	2 strokes	(Norway) Kristoffer Reitan (Germany) Marcel Schneider

== Runner-up finishes on the European Tour in 2025 ==
No.	Date	Player	Tournament	Winner	Winning score	Runner-up score
1	15 Dec 2024	(England) John Parry	Alfred Dunhill Championship	(South Africa) Shaun Norris	−13 (67-70-71-67=275)	−12 (67-71-69-69=276)
2	23 Feb 2025	(England) John Parry (2)	Magical Kenya Open	(South Africa) Jacques Kruyswijk	−18 (69-66-64-67=266)	−16 (63-65-72-68=268)
3	27 Apr	(Norway) Kristoffer Reitan	Hainan Classic	(England) Marco Penge	−17 (68-71-65-67=271)	−14 (66-75-66-67=274)
4	1 Jun	(Norway) Kristoffer Reitan (2)	Austrian Alpine Open	(Germany) Nicolai von Dellingshausen	−19 (65-66-65-65=261)	−17 (67-69-67-60=263)
5	8 Jun	(Sweden) Joakim Lagergren	KLM Open	(Scotland) Connor Syme	−11 (65-72-66-70=273)	−9 (66-68-71-70=275)
6	29 Jun	(France) Martin Couvra	Italian Open	(France) Adrien Saddier	−14 (69-64-67-66=266)	−12 (69-63-67-69=268)

== See also ==
- 2024 European Tour Qualifying School graduates
