= 2023–24 Sunshine Tour =

Golf tour season

2023–24 Sunshine Tour season
- Duration: 4 May 2023 – 14 April 2024
- Number of official events: 31
- Most wins: (South Africa) Dean Burmester (2) (South Africa) Luca Filippi (2) (South Africa) Louis Oosthuizen (2) (South Africa) Neil Schietekat (2) (South Africa) Ryan van Velzen (2)
- Order of Merit: (South Africa) Ryan van Velzen
- Rookie of the Year: (South Africa) Robin Williams

The 2023–24 Sunshine Tour was the 53rd season of the Sunshine Tour (formerly the Southern Africa Tour), the main professional golf tour in South Africa since it was formed in 1971.

== Changes for 2023–24 ==
The full 2023–24 schedule was announced in May 2023 and was originally intended to have 32 tournaments, and include co-sanctioned tournaments with the European Tour and Challenge Tour. Notably, the Zanaco Masters returned to the schedule, having not been played on the Sunshine Tour since 2019.

In May 2023, the Sunshine Tour announced a new title sponsor for the Order of Merit. Previously known as the Luno Order of Merit, it was rebranded as the Order of Merit delivered by The Courier Guy.

== Schedule ==
The following table lists official events during the 2023–24 season.

Date	Tournament	Location	Purse (R)	Winner (Note: The number in brackets after each winner's name is the number of Sunshine Tour events they had won up to and including that tournament. This information is only shown for Sunshine Tour members.)	OWGR points	Other tours (Note: CHA − Challenge Tour; EUR − European Tour.)	Notes
7 May	FBC Zim Open	Zimbabwe	2,200,000	(South Africa) Neil Schietekat (4)	1.65		
21 May	Zanaco Masters	Zambia	2,200,000	(Zimbabwe) Robson Chinhoi (1)	1.53		
28 May	Kit Kat Cash & Carry Pro-Am	Gauteng	2,000,000	(South Africa) Louis Albertse (2)	1.87		Pro-Am
2 Jun	SunBet Challenge (Sun City)	North West	1,250,000	(South Africa) Hennie Otto (14)	1.95		
22 Jul	SunBet Challenge (Wild Coast)	Western Cape	2,000,000	(South Africa) CJ du Plessis (1)	1.80		
29 Jul	FNB Eswatini Challenge	Eswatini	2,000,000	(Greece) Peter Karmis (7)	1.39		
13 Aug	Vodacom Origins of Golf at Zebula	Limpopo	2,000,000	(South Africa) Jacques Kruyswijk (3)	2.06		
18 Aug	SunBet Challenge (Time Square)	Gauteng	2,000,000	(South Africa) Malcolm Mitchell (1)	2.37		
27 Aug	Bain's Whisky Ubunye Championship	Gauteng	2,000,000	(South Africa) Luca Filippi (1) and (South Africa) Ryan van Velzen (2)	n/a		Team event
1 Sep	Gary & Vivienne Player Challenge	Mpumalanga	2,000,000	(South Africa) Gerhard Pepler (1)	1.65		
17 Sep	VOG Western Cape	Western Cape	2,000,000	(South Africa) Kyle Barker (2)	1.64		
23 Sep	PGA Championship	Eastern Cape	2,000,000	(South Africa) Rupert Kaminski (1)	1.84		
8 Oct	Fortress Invitational	Gauteng	2,000,000	(South Africa) Robin Williams (1)	1.46		
14 Oct	Blue Label Challenge	North West	2,700,000	(South Africa) Luca Filippi (2)	1.63		Pro-Am
22 Oct	VOG KZN	KwaZulu-Natal	2,000,000	(South Africa) Pieter Moolman (2)	1.68		
27 Oct	SunBet Challenge (Sun Sibaya)	KwaZulu-Natal	2,000,000	(South Africa) Martin Rohwer (4)	1.80		
5 Nov	Vodacom Origins of Golf Final	Western Cape	2,000,000	(South Africa) Neil Schietekat (5)	1.47		
26 Nov	Joburg Open	Gauteng	20,500,000	(South Africa) Dean Burmester (9)	11.95	EUR	
3 Dec	Investec South African Open Championship	Gauteng	US$1,500,000	(South Africa) Dean Burmester (10)	12.59	EUR	
11 Dec	Alfred Dunhill Championship	Mpumalanga	€1,500,000	(South Africa) Louis Oosthuizen (9)	14.07	EUR	
17 Dec	AfrAsia Bank Mauritius Open	Mauritius	US$1,200,000	(South Africa) Louis Oosthuizen (10)	11.05	EUR	
28 Jan	Mediclinic Invitational	Gauteng	2,000,000	(South Africa) Ryan van Velzen (3)	2.46		
4 Feb	SDC Open	Limpopo	US$350,000	(Wales) Rhys Enoch (3)	5.89	CHA	
11 Feb	Bain's Whisky Cape Town Open	Western Cape	US$350,000	(Sweden) Mikael Lindberg (n/a)	6.40	CHA	
18 Feb	Dimension Data Pro-Am	Western Cape	7,000,000	(France) David Ravetto (n/a)	7.35	CHA	
25 Feb	NMB Championship	Eastern Cape	US$350,000	(Sweden) Björn Åkesson (n/a)	5.49	CHA	
3 Mar	SDC Championship	Eastern Cape	US$1,500,000	(United States) Jordan Gumberg (n/a)	13.81	EUR	
10 Mar	Jonsson Workwear Open	Gauteng	US$1,500,000	(Italy) Matteo Manassero (n/a)	13.99	EUR	
24 Mar	Stella Artois Players Championship	Gauteng	2,000,000	(South Africa) Heinrich Bruiners (2)	2.87		
7 Apr	Limpopo Championship	Limpopo	2,000,000	(South Africa) Deon Germishuys (2)	2.57		
14 Apr	The Tour Championship	Gauteng	2,000,000	(South Africa) Jonathan Broomhead (1)	3.13		Tour Championship

=== Unofficial events ===
The following events were sanctioned by the Sunshine Tour, but did not carry official money, nor were wins official.

Date	Tournament	Location	Purse (R)	Winner	OWGR points	Other tours	Notes
26 Apr	Altron Vusi Ngubeni Tournament	Gauteng	100,000	(South Africa) Thabang Simon	n/a		

== Order of Merit ==
The Order of Merit was titled as the Order of Merit delivered by The Courier Guy and was based on tournament results during the season, calculated using a points-based system. The top three players on the Order of Merit (not otherwise exempt) earned status to play on the 2025 European Tour (DP World Tour).

Position	Player	Points	Status earned
1	(South Africa) Ryan van Velzen	3,525	Promoted to European Tour
2	(South Africa) Robin Williams	2,690	Already exempt (Note: Williams was already exempt due to finishing inside the Top 114 of the 2024 Race to Dubai as a non-member.)
3	(South Africa) Louis Albertse	2,412	Promoted to European Tour
4	(South Africa) Neil Schietekat	2,283	Promoted to European Tour
5	(South Africa) Darren Fichardt	1,915	

== Awards ==
Award	Winner	Ref.
Rookie of the Year (Bobby Locke Trophy)	(South Africa) Robin Williams	

== See also ==
- 2023–24 Big Easy Tour
