= Robin Williams (golfer) =

South African professional golfer

Personal information
- Full name: Robin Tiger Williams
- Nationality: England (until 2022); South Africa (2023–)
- Born: 16 September 2001 (age 25) Stellenbosch, South Africa

Career
- Sport: Golf
- Turned professional: 2021
- Current tours: European Tour; Challenge Tour; Sunshine Tour
- Former tours: Challenge Tour; MENA Tour; Big Easy Tour
- Professional wins: 5

Number of wins by tour
- Sunshine Tour: 2
- Other: 3

Achievements and awards
- Sunshine Tour Rookie of the Year: 2023–24

Robin Tiger Williams (born 16 September 2001) is an English-South African professional golfer who plays on the Sunshine Tour.

== Early life and amateur career ==
Williams was born in Stellenbosch, South Africa and moved to the UK at the age of eight due to his father's work commitments. He moved to Peterborough in August 2010, where he joined Peterborough Milton Golf Club in England. Williams represented England as an amateur at boys and mens level. He represented Europe in the Junior Ryder Cup in 2018; also meeting Tiger Woods, who his middle name is taken from. In October 2019, he won as an amateur on the MENA Tour in Jordan. In 2021, he finished runner-up in the St Andrews Links Trophy, losing in a playoff to Jack Cope.

== Professional career ==
Williams turned professional in July 2021. He claimed his first victory as a professional in April 2023 at the Altron Vusi Ngubeni Tournament (an unofficial Sunshine Tour event). In August, he won on the Big Easy Tour. In October, he claimed his first Sunshine Tour victory at the Fortress Invitational at Glendower Golf Club.

=== 2024 ===
In March 2024, Williams was defeated in a sudden-death playoff by Jordan Gumberg at the SDC Championship, an event co-sanctioned by the European Tour and the Sunshine Tour. He went on to finish second on the 2023–24 Sunshine Tour Order of Merit and earned Rookie of the Year honours. Williams also claimed a European Tour card for the 2025 season. In October, he successfully defended his Fortress Invitational title, claiming his second Sunshine Tour victory.

== Amateur wins ==
- 2016 AJGA Junior at Owensboro

== Professional wins (5) ==
=== Sunshine Tour wins (2) ===
No.	Date	Tournament	Winning score	Margin of victory	Runner-up
1	8 Oct 2023	Fortress Invitational	−19 (66-67-68-68=269)	6 strokes	(United States) Dan Erickson
2	20 Oct 2024	Fortress Invitational (2)	−22 (64-65-70-67=266)	3 strokes	(South Africa) Daniel van Tonder

Sunshine Tour playoff record (0–1)

No.	Year	Tournament	Opponent	Result
1	2024	SDC Championship	(United States) Jordan Gumberg	Lost to birdie on second extra hole

=== MENA Tour wins (1) ===
No.	Date	Tournament	Winning score	Margin of victory	Runner-up
1	3 Oct 2019	Journey to Jordan 2 (as an amateur)	−16 (68-66-66=200)	8 strokes	(England) Jack Floydd

=== Big Easy Tour wins (1) ===
No.	Date	Tournament	Winning score	Margin of victory	Runner-up
1	3 Aug 2023	Altron Big Easy Tour 3	−5 (69-68-74=211)	Playoff	(South Africa) Jordan Duminy

=== Other wins (1) ===
No.	Date	Tournament	Winning score	Margin of victory	Runner-up
1	21 Apr 2023	Altron Vusi Ngubeni Tournament	−8 (67-72-72-69=280)	Playoff	(South Africa) Teboho Sefatsa

Other playoff record (1–0)

No.	Year	Tournament	Opponent	Result
1	2023	Altron Vusi Ngubeni Tournament	(South Africa) Teboho Sefatsa	Won with par on fifth extra hole

== Playoff record ==
European Tour playoff record (0–1)

No.	Year	Tournament	Opponent	Result
1	2024	SDC Championship	(United States) Jordan Gumberg	Lost to birdie on second extra hole

== Team appearances ==
- Junior Ryder Cup (representing Europe): 2018
- Jacques Léglise Trophy (representing Great Britain & Ireland): 2017, 2018 (winners)

== See also ==
- 2024 Challenge Tour graduates
