= 2013 Big Easy Tour =

Golf tour season

2013 Big Easy Tour season
- Duration: 9 April 2013 – 25 October 2013
- Number of official events: 12
- Order of Merit: (South Africa) Divan Gerber

The 2013 Big Easy Tour was the third season of the Big Easy Tour, the official development tour to the Sunshine Tour.

== Schedule ==
The following table lists official events during the 2013 season.

Date	Tournament	Location	Purse (R)	Winner (Note: The number in brackets after each winner's name is the number of Big Easy Tour events they had won up to and including that tournament. It is rare for someone to accumulate many wins on the Big Easy Tour as success at this level usually leads to promotion to the Sunshine Tour.)
10 Apr	Roodepoort CC	Gauteng	100,000	(South Africa) Dylan Frittelli (1)
24 Apr	Observatory GC	Gauteng	100,000	(Zimbabwe) Micky Hough (1)
8 May	Centurion CC	Gauteng	100,000	(South Africa) Toto Thimba Jr. (2)
24 May	Kempton Park GC	Gauteng	100,000	(South Africa) Jaco Prinsloo (1)
7 Jun	Irene CC	Gauteng	100,000	(South Africa) Anton Haig (1)
19 Jun	Wingate CC	Gauteng	100,000	(England) Jeff Inglis (3)
26 Jun	Houghton GC	Gauteng	100,000	(South Africa) Attie Schwartzel (1)
10 Jul	Benoni CC	Gauteng	100,000	(South Africa) Kevin Stone (1)
24 Jul	Royal J & K	Gauteng	100,000	(South Africa) Morne Buys (2)
14 Aug	The Els Club	Gauteng	100,000	(South Africa) Jacques Kruyswijk (1)
23 Aug	ERPM GC	Gauteng	100,000	(South Africa) Dean O'Riley (2)
25 Oct	Big Easy Tour Championship	Gauteng	250,000	(South Africa) Divan Gerber (2)

== Order of Merit ==
The Order of Merit was based on prize money won during the season, calculated in South African rand. The top five players on the Order of Merit earned status to play on the 2014 Sunshine Tour.

Position	Player	Prize money (R)
1	(South Africa) Divan Gerber	60,695
2	(South Africa) Attie Schwartzel	57,255
3	(South Africa) Francois Coetzee	49,202
4	(South Africa) Jacques Kruyswijk	43,233
5	(South Africa) Dean O'Riley	37,880
