= Jacques Kruyswijk =

South African professional golfer

Personal information
- Nationality: South Africa
- Born: 16 October 1992 (age 34) Pretoria, South Africa
- Height: 6 ft 5 in (1.96 m)

Career
- Sport: Golf
- Turned professional: 2013
- Current tours: European Tour; Sunshine Tour
- Former tours: Challenge Tour; Big Easy Tour
- Professional wins: 13

Number of wins by tour
- European Tour: 1
- Sunshine Tour: 4
- Challenge Tour: 1
- Other: 7

Best results in major championships
- Masters Tournament: DNP
- PGA Championship: DNP
- U.S. Open: CUT: 2025
- The Open Championship: DNP

Jacques Kruyswijk (born 16 October 1992) is a South African professional golfer who plays on the European Tour and Sunshine Tour. He won the 2016 Cape Town Open.

== Amateur career ==
Kruyswijk enjoyed a stellar career as an amateur and won the Royal Silver Vase in 2011.

He represented Limpopo Province between 2005 and 2012. In 2011 he was nominated as the SA IPT Player of the Year. He recorded six victories on the IGT Tour.

== Professional career ==
Kruyswijk turned professional in January 2013 after he finished 7th in the 2013 Sunshine Tour Q-School. He recorded his first professional victory in his rookie season in an event on the Big Easy Tour. In 2015, he received attention at the Vodacom Origins of Golf at Koro Creek event, when he got a one shot penalty after whacking his ball off a tree then into his groin.

On the 2016–17 Sunshine Tour he won the Lion of Africa Cape Town Open in November and tied for 4th at the Joburg Open in February. He finished 11th on the Order of Merit. On the 2017–18 Sunshine Tour he tied for 4th at the South African Open and again finished 11th on the Order of Merit.

Kruyswijk joined the European Tour in 2017 after finishing tied second among the 2017 European Tour Qualifying School graduates.

In 2020, his best results were 3rd-place finishes at the Eye of Africa PGA Championship and Limpopo Championship.

In 2021, Kruyswijk recorded five top-10s on the European Tour and finished in 116th place on the Order of Merit, retaining his card. He also recorded his second Sunshine Tour victory when he won the Sunshine Tour Invitational held at his home club, the Centurion Country Club. He broke into the top-200 on the Official World Golf Ranking for the first time following this win.

In February 2025, Kruyswijk claimed his first European Tour victory at the Magical Kenya Open. He beat John Parry by two shots. His final round also gained attention due to his use of white chalk on his hands in order to help his grip with his driver.

== Professional wins (13) ==
=== European Tour wins (1) ===
No.	Date	Tournament	Winning score	Margin of victory	Runner-up
1	23 Feb 2025	Magical Kenya Open	−18 (69-66-64-67=266)	2 strokes	(England) John Parry

European Tour playoff record (0–1)

No.	Year	Tournament	Opponents	Result
1	2025	Joburg Open	(Scotland) Calum Hill, (South Africa) Shaun Norris	Hill won with par on second extra hole

=== Sunshine Tour wins (4) ===
No.	Date	Tournament	Winning score	Margin of victory	Runner(s)-up
1	27 Nov 2016	Lion of Africa Cape Town Open	−17 (67-66-68-70=271)	2 strokes	(South Africa) Justin Harding, (South Africa) Brandon Stone
2	12 Sep 2021	Sunshine Tour Invitational	−18 (67-64-67=198)	1 stroke	(South Africa) Michael Palmer, (South Africa) Albert Venter
3	13 Aug 2023	Vodacom Origins of Golf at Zebula	−13 (68-68-67=203)	1 stroke	(South Africa) Heinrich Bruiners
4	28 Sep 2025	Vodacom Origins of Golf (2) at Devonvale	−10 (68-62-73=203)	Playoff	(South Africa) George Coetzee

Sunshine Tour playoff record (1–1)

No.	Year	Tournament	Opponent(s)	Result
1	2025	Joburg Open	(Scotland) Calum Hill, (South Africa) Shaun Norris	Hill won with par on second extra hole
2	2025	Vodacom Origins of Golf at Devonvale	(South Africa) George Coetzee	Won with par on second extra hole

=== Challenge Tour wins (1) ===
No.	Date	Tournament	Winning score	Margin of victory	Runners-up
1	27 Aug 2023	Dormy Open	−9 (64-65-63=192) (Note: Shortened to 54 holes due to weather.)	2 strokes	(Germany) Anton Albers, (Spain) Iván Cantero, (France) Ugo Coussaud, (Republic of Ireland) Conor Purcell

=== Big Easy Tour wins (1) ===
No.	Date	Tournament	Winning score	Margin of victory	Runner-up
1	14 Aug 2013	The Els Club	−6 (70-68=138)	Playoff	(South Africa) Desne van den Bergh

=== IGT Pro Tour wins (6) ===
No.	Date	Tournament	Winning score	Margin of victory	Runner(s)-up
1	18 Jun 2012	#17 IGT Serengeti Challenge (as an amateur)	−8 (64)	3 strokes	(South Africa) Jonathan Waschefort (a)
2	30 Aug 2012	#25 IGT Race to Q-School (as an amateur)	−7 (72-66-72-71=281)	3 strokes	(South Africa) Teaghan Gauche (a), (South Africa) Coert Groenewald (a), (South Africa) Danie Pretorius (a)
3	20 Nov 2014	Battle of the Giants Glendower Golf Club	−10 (70-68-68=206)	1 stroke	(South Africa) Werner van Niekerk
4	8 Jul 2015	Wanna be a Champion Academy Classic	−11 (67-66-72=205)	5 strokes	(South Africa) Anthony Michael
5	13 Aug 2015	CA Academy Classic	−16 (68-66-66=200)	6 strokes	(South Africa) Phillip Kruse (a)
6	27 Nov 2015	Race to Q-School #8	−14 (73-64-65=202)	1 stroke	(England) David Ashley

== Results in major championships ==
Tournament	2025
Masters Tournament	
PGA Championship	
U.S. Open	CUT
The Open Championship	

Did not play

CUT = missed the halfway cut

== See also ==
- 2017 European Tour Qualifying School graduates
- 2023 European Tour Qualifying School graduates
