= Matthew Baldwin =

English golfer

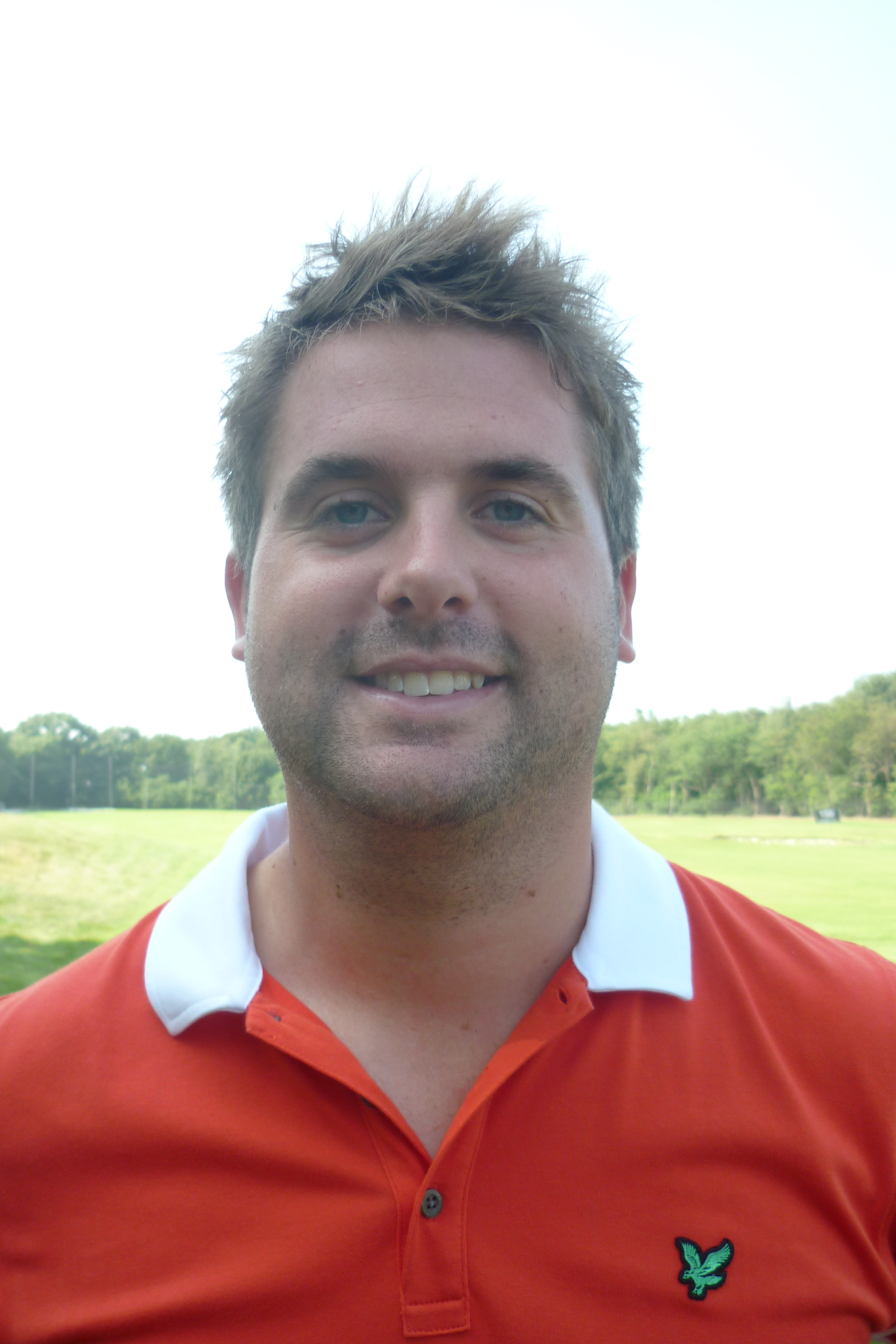

Personal information
- Full name: Matthew David Baldwin
- Nationality: England
- Born: 26 February 1986 (age 40) Southport, England
- Height: 5 ft 11 in (1.80 m)
- Spouse: Claire Baldwin

Career
- Sport: Golf
- Turned professional: 2008
- Current tour: European Tour
- Former tours: Challenge Tour; MENA Tour
- Professional wins: 3

Number of wins by tour
- European Tour: 1
- Sunshine Tour: 1
- Challenge Tour: 1
- Other: 1

Best results in major championships
- Masters Tournament: DNP
- PGA Championship: DNP
- U.S. Open: T59: 2012
- The Open Championship: T23: 2012

Matthew David Baldwin (born 26 February 1986) is an English professional golfer who plays on the European Tour.

== Career ==
Baldwin was captain of the England Boys side before turning professional in 2008. In 2009 he played on the third-tier Alps Tour and finished 23rd on the Order of Merit, with six top-ten finishes. He made several appearances on the second-tier Challenge Tour in 2010, and performed well enough to finish 82nd on the final standings and gain full status for 2011. In October 2011, he won for the first time on the Challenge Tour at the Fred Olsen Challenge de España. This sealed his promotion to the main European Tour for 2012. He played well enough in his first full season to retain his playing rights, finishing 72nd on the Order of Merit.

In March 2023, Baldwin won on the European Tour for the first time at the SDC Championship in South Africa, an event co-sanctioned by the Sunshine Tour. He won by seven shots ahead of Adri Arnaus.

== Personal life ==
Baldwin is from Southport, Merseyside; the same home town as fellow professional golfer Tommy Fleetwood. His grandfather is the former professional rugby league footballer Ron Ryder.

== Amateur wins ==
- 2002 McGregor Trophy
- 2004 European Boys Individual Championship

== Professional wins (3) ==
=== European Tour wins (1) ===
No.	Date	Tournament	Winning score	Margin of victory	Runner-up
1	19 Mar 2023	SDC Championship^{1}	−18 (70-67-65-68=270)	7 strokes	(Spain) Adri Arnaus

^{1}Co-sanctioned by the Sunshine Tour

=== Challenge Tour wins (1) ===
No.	Date	Tournament	Winning score	Margin of victory	Runner-up
1	2 Oct 2011	Fred Olsen Challenge de España	−21 (63-67-65-68=263)	Playoff	(France) Julien Guerrier

Challenge Tour playoff record (1–1)

No.	Year	Tournament	Opponent	Result
1	2011	Fred Olsen Challenge de España	(France) Julien Guerrier	Won with par on third extra hole
2	2019	ISPS Handa World Invitational	(England) Jack Senior	Lost to birdie on second extra hole

=== MENA Tour wins (1) ===
No.	Date	Tournament	Winning score	Margin of victory	Runner-up
1	11 Feb 2019	Journey to Jordan 1	−19 (65-66-66=197)	8 strokes	(Sweden) Erik Jonasson

== Results in major championships ==
Tournament	2012	2013	2014	2015	2016	2017	2018
Masters Tournament							
U.S. Open	T59				CUT		
The Open Championship	T23		CUT				
PGA Championship							

Tournament	2019	2026
Masters Tournament		
PGA Championship		
U.S. Open		
The Open Championship	CUT	CUT

Did not play

CUT = missed the half-way cut
"T" = tied

== Team appearances ==
Amateur

- European Boys' Team Championship (representing England): 2004 (winners)
- Jacques Léglise Trophy (representing Great Britain & Ireland): 2004 (winners)

== See also ==
- 2011 Challenge Tour graduates
- 2017 European Tour Qualifying School graduates
- 2022 Challenge Tour graduates
- 2025 European Tour Qualifying School graduates
