= 2019 MENA Tour =

Golf tour season

2019 MENA Tour season
- Duration: 9 February 2019 – 29 November 2019
- Number of official events: 10
- Order of Merit: (South Africa) Mathiam Keyser

The 2019 MENA Tour was the eighth season of the MENA Tour.

== Schedule ==
The following table lists official events during the 2019 season.

Date	Tournament	Host country	Purse (US$)	Winner (Note: The number in brackets after each winner's name is the number of MENA Tour events they had won up to and including that tournament.)	OWGR points
11 Feb	Journey to Jordan 1	Jordan	100,000	(England) Matthew Baldwin (1)	3
20 Feb	Troon Series – Al Zorah Open	UAE	75,000	(Australia) Daniel Gaunt (1)	3
27 Feb	Ghala Golf Open	Oman	75,000	(England) Nick Marsh (1)	3
7 Mar	Troon Series – Dubai Open	UAE	75,000	(South Africa) Mathiam Keyser (3)	3
13 Mar	Troon Series – Royal Golf Bahrain Open	Bahrain	75,000	(France) Robin Roussel (1)	3
3 Oct	Journey to Jordan 2	Jordan	100,000	(England) Robin Williams (a) (1)	3
9 Oct	Abu Dhabi Open	UAE	75,000	(England) James Allan (2)	3
23 Oct	Al Ain Open	UAE	75,000	(England) Josh Hill (a) (1)	3
30 Oct	Ras Al Khaimah Open	UAE	75,000	(Sweden) Niclas Weiland (1)	3
29 Nov	Journey to Jordan Final	Jordan	100,000	(England) Harry Konig (1)	3

== Order of Merit ==
The Order of Merit was titled as the Journey to Jordan and was based on tournament results during the season, calculated using a points-based system.

Position	Player	Points
1	(South Africa) Mathiam Keyser	45,153
2	(Australia) Daniel Gaunt	37,928
3	(England) James Allan	28,491
4	(England) Matthew Baldwin	27,820
5	(France) Robin Roussel	25,190
