= French International Amateur Championship =

Tournament information
- Location: France
- Established: 1904
- Organised by: Fédération française de golf
- Format: 72-hole stroke play
- Month played: May

Current champion
- (Netherlands) Benjamin Reuter

The French International Amateur Championship is an annual amateur golf tournament that is held in France and organised by the Fédération Française de Golf.

The French Open Amateur Championship was established in 1904 and used match play format. In 1986, a national open amateur 72-hole stroke play championship was instituted. The French Open Amateur Stroke Play Championship elevated the standing of the pre-existing Grand Prix de Chantilly, established in 1945 and held at Golf de Chantilly in Vineuil-Saint-Firmin. From this time, the match play championship was held in alternate years until 2001, after which it was discontinued. The match play returned annually for three years from 2008 to 2010 before being discontinued once more.

== Trophies ==
The French Open Amateur Championship was played for the Trophée Gordon Bennett. When the stroke play championship began, the match play championship retained this trophy. The French Open Amateur Stroke Play Championship adopted the Grand Prix de Chantilly's Coupe Murat, named for the grandson of Joachim, 6th Prince Murat, president of Chantilly Golf Club between 1909 and 1932.

In 2023, the Coupe Murat was transferred to the French Open Mid-Amateur Championship, for over 35s, and the Trophée Gordon Bennett returned to the men's open amateur.

== Winners ==
French International Amateur Championship – Trophée Gordon Bennett
Year	Champion	Score	Margin of victory	Runner(s)-up	Venue	Ref
2024	(Netherlands) Benjamin Reuter	212	1 stroke	(Switzerland) Jean-leon Aeschlimann (France) Giampaolo Gagliardi (Switzerland) Filippo Serra	Aisses	
2023	(Germany) Carl Siemens	211	5 strokes	(France) Nathan Legendre	Aisses	

French Open Amateur Stroke Play Championship – Coupe Murat
Year	Champion	Score	Margin of victory	Runner(s)-up	Ref
2022	(France) Martin Couvra	282 (−2)	5 strokes	(France) Adam Bresnu (France) Ugo Malcor	
2021	(Germany) Philipp Katich	281 (−3)	2 strokes	(Italy) Andrea Romano (Italy) Matteo Cristoni	
2020	No tournament				
2019	(France) Charles Larcelet	280 (−4)	3 strokes	(Netherlands) Jerry Ji	
2018	(France) Hubert Tisserand	279 (−5)	1 stroke	(France) Jérémy Gandon (France) Francois Lagraulet	
2017	(England) Josh Hilleard	278 (−6)	Playoff	(France) Pierre Pineau	
2016	(Spain) Iván Cantero	208 (−5)	Playoff	(England) Marco Penge	
2015	(France) Jeong-weon Ko	284 (par)	Playoff	(France) Francois Lagraulet	
2014	(Germany) Maximilian Röhrig	277 (−7)	Playoff	(France) Kenny Subregis	
2013	(France) Adrien Saddier	280 (−4)	5 strokes	(Germany) Martin Keskari	
2012	(France) Lionel Weber	287 (+3)	1 stroke	(France) Romain Langasque	
2011	(France) Gary Stal	280 (−4)	8 strokes	(France) Edouard Espana	
2010	(France) Alexander Lévy	270 (−10)	2 strokes	(Spain) Adrian Otaegui	
2009	(Finland) Kalle Samooja	281 (+1)	2 strokes	(England) Darren Wright	
2008	(France) David Antonelli	275 (−5)	5 strokes	(Italy) Federico Colombo	
2007	(Netherlands) Tim Sluiter	274 (−6)	6 strokes	(England) Dale Whitnell	
2006	(Germany) Sean Einhaus	278 (−2)	6 strokes	(Netherlands) Tim Sluiter	
2005	(Switzerland) Tino Weiss			(France) Julien Grillon	
2004	(France) François Calmels				
2003	(France) Yves Petit-Dubousquet				
2002	(France) François Illouz				
2001	(France) Philippe Lima				
2000	(France) François Delamontagne				
1999	(France) Sébastien Branger				
1998	(Germany) Tino Schuster				
1997	(France) Christophe Ravetto				
1996	(France) Benjamin Nicolay				
1995	(France) François Illouz				
1994	(Denmark) Jesper Kjærbye				
1993	(France) Jean-Marc de Polo				
1992	(Mexico) Alberto Valenzuela				
1991	(France) François Illouz				
1990	(Sweden) Klas Eriksson				
1989	(Denmark) Henrik Simonsen				
1988	(Sweden) Joakim Haeggman				
1987	(Mexico) Alberto Valenzuela				
1986	(Taiwan) Lin Chie-hsiang				

French Open Amateur Match Play Championship – Trophée Gordon Bennett
Year	Champion	Score	Runner(s)-up	Venue	Ref
2010	(France) Clément Berardo	10 and 8	(France) Franck Daux	Saint-Germain	
2009	(France) Thomas Elissalde	5 and 4	(Switzerland) Ken Benz	Saint-Cloud	
2008	(France) Gary Stal	5 and 4	(France) Jérôme Lando-Casanova	Fontainebleau	
2002–2007	Not held				
2001	(Denmark) Christian Bindslev	4 and 3	(France) Charles-Édouard Russo	Médoc	
2000	Not held				
1999	(France) Sébastian Branger	4 and 3	(England) Neil Pabari	Seignosse	
1998	Not held				
1997	(Spain) Sergio García	9 and 8	(England) Gary Birch	Palmola	
1996	Not held				
1995	(France) Christophe Ravetto	2 and 1	(France) Sébastien Delagrange	Médoc	
1994	Not held				
1993	(Spain) Álvaro Salto	4 and 3	(France) Thomas Besancenez	Wantzenau	
1992	Not held				
1991	(Australia) Philip Johns	3 and 2	(Mexico) Alberto Valenzuela	Le Golf National	
1990	Not held				
1989	(United States) Gary Shemano	6 and 5	(Finland) Sauli Mäkiluoma	Morfontaine	
1988	Not held				
1987	(Sweden) Frederik Lindgren	4 and 3	(France) Éric Giraud	Nîmes Campagne	
1986	Not held				
1985	(Egypt) Ramy Taher	2 and 1	(France) Jean-François Remésy	Saint-Nom-la-Bretèche	
1984	(France) Alexis Godillot	3 and 2	(United States) John Baldwin	Chantilly	
1983	(Italy) Sergio Prati	2 holes	(France) Jean van de Velde	Fontainebleau	
1982	(France) François Illouz	6 and 5	(France) Martial Papineau	Morfontaine	
1981	(France) François Illouz	3 and 2	(West Germany) Kai Flint	Le Touquet	
1980	(Australia) Tony Gresham	4 and 2	(Australia) John Kelly	Chantilly	
1979	(France) Alexis Godillot	3 and 2	(France) Sven Boinet	Saint-Germain	
1978	(South Africa) Gavan Levenson	4 and 3	(Italy) Lorenzo Silva	Saint-Nom-la-Bretèche	
1977	(France) Tim Planchin	37th hole	(France) Michel Gayon	Saint-Cloud	
1976	(France) Tim Planchin	1 hole	(West Germany) Viet Pagel	Morfontaine	
1975	(France) Tim Planchin	3 and 2	(South Africa) Robbie Stewart	Fontainebleau	
1974	(France) Alexis Godillot	4 and 3	(South Africa) Neville Sundelson	Le Touquet	
1973	(France) Hervé Frayssineau	1 hole	(United States) George Burns	Chantilly	
1972	(France) Roger Lagarde	6 and 5	(France) Michel Tapia	Morfontaine	
1971	(France) Jean-Charles Desbordes	4 and 3	(France) Didier Charmat	Deauville	
1970	(South Africa) Reginald Taylor	7 and 6	(France) Didier Charmat	Chantilly	
1969	(France) Alexis Godillot	37th hole	(England) Rodney Gorton	La Boulie	
1968	Not held				
1967	(France) Alexis Godillot	3 and 2	(France) Gaëtan Mourgue d'Algue	Morfontaine	
1966	(France) Gaëtan Mourgue d'Algue	6 and 5	(France) Patrick Cros	Chantilly	
1965	(France) Gaëtan Mourgue d'Algue	8 and 7	(France) Robert Nouel	Saint-Cloud	
1964	(United States) Jim Bostwick	8 and 7	(Belgium) Paul Rolin	Deauville	
1963	(France) Patrick Cros	41st hole	(France) Gaëtan Mourgue d'Algue	Saint-Nom-la-Bretèche	
1962	(France) Gaëtan Mourgue d'Algue	3 and 1	(United States) David Goldman	Chantilly	
1961	(Belgium) Jacky Moerman	2 holes	(England) William Pearce	Deauville	
1960	(France) Henri de Lamaze	4 and 2	(United States) John Dawson	Morfontaine	
1959	(France) Henri de Lamaze	9 and 7	(United States) Paul Coste	Saint-Germain	
1958	(France) Henri de Lamaze	4 and 3	(United States) Tim Holland	Deauville	
1957	(France) Henri de Lamaze	7 and 6	(United States) Ken Smith	Chantilly	
1956	(France) Henri de Lamaze	1 hole	(Italy) Franco Bevione	La Boulie	
1955	(France) Henri de Lamaze	5 and 4	(United States) Don Bisplinghoff	Chantilly	
1954	(France) Henri de Lamaze	4 and 3	(United States) Clarke Hardwicke	Saint-Germain	
1953	(France) Roger Lagarde	2 and 1	(England) Harry Bentley	Chantilly	
1952	(United States) Dick Chapman	4 and 3	(United States) Billy Maxwell	Morfontaine	
1951	(United States) Robert Knowles	3 and 2	(France) Henri de Lamaze	Chantilly	
1950	(France) Henri de Lamaze	3 and 2	(France) Michel Carlhian	Saint-Germain	
1949	(France) Henri de Lamaze	3 and 1	(England) Philip Scrutton	Saint-Cloud	
1948	(France) Henri de Lamaze	2 and 1	(England) Charlie Stowe	Chantilly	
1947	(France) Henri de Lamaze	2 and 1	(France) Jacques Léglise	Morfontaine	
1946	(France) Michel Carlhian	3 and 2	(France) Henri Alibaux	Chantilly	
1940–1945	Not held				
1939	(United States) Dick Chapman	5 and 4	(France) Jacques Léglise	Saint-Germain	
1938	(United States) Robert Dunkelberger	3 and 2	(England) Arnold Bentley	Dieppe	
1937	(France) Jacques Léglise	1 hole	(England) Henry Longhurst	Morfontaine	
1936	(France) Michel Carlhian	4 and 2	(England) Michael Scott	Le Touquet	
1935	(Spain) Luis de Arana	1 hole	(Spain) Javier de Arana	Morfontaine	
1934	(Spain) Javier de Arana	2 holes	(England) Francis Francis	Chiberta	
1933	(England) Alfred Critchley	10 and 9	(United States) George Dixon	Fourqueux	
1932	(England) Harry Bentley	7 and 6	(England) Noel Layton	Le Touquet	
1931	(England) Harry Bentley	4 and 3	(England) Cyril Hardman	Granville	
1930	(United States) George Von Elm	9 and 8	(England) R. G. Morrison	La Boulie	
1929	(United States) Jack Westland	6 and 5	(England) Richard Fletcher	Chantilly	
1928	(England) Thomas Bourn	8 and 7	(United States) Arthur Vincent	Saint-Germain	
1927	(England) John Mellor	4 and 2	(United States) Harry Van Brower	Wimereux	
1926	(United States) John Anderson	10 and 9	(United States) W. L. Richard	Saint-Cloud	
1925	(France) André Vagliano	6 and 4	(France) André Gobert	Chantilly	
1924	(United States) John Anderson	1 hole	(England) Cyril Tolley	La Boulie	
1923	(England) George Hannay	5 and 4	(England) Michael Scott	Dieppe	
1922	(England) Michael Scott	6 and 4	(England) Bernard Drew	Le Touquet	
1921	(England) Charles Lipscomb	5 and 3	(England) David Stoner Crowther	Chantilly	
1920	(Scotland) Tommy Armour	3 and 2	(England) Cyril Tolley	La Boulie	
1915–1919	Not held				
1914	(United States) Francis Ouimet	4 and 3	(England) Henry Topping	La Boulie	
1913	(England) Charles Hope	37th hole	(England) Edward Lassen	La Boulie	
1912	(England) Michael Scott	8 and 6	(Scotland) Charles Macfarlane	La Boulie	
1911	(United States) Chick Evans	38th hole	(United States) John Anderson	La Boulie	
1910	(Republic of Ireland) Peter Gannon	1 hole	(Scotland) Leslie Balfour-Melville	La Boulie	
1909	(France) François de Bellet	6 and 5	(England) Allan Macbeth	La Boulie	
1908	(England) Walter Pringle	3 and 1	(England) Gilbert Allis	La Boulie	
1907	(England) Sidney Chesterton	9 and 7	(England) Reginald Graham	La Boulie	
1906	(England) Reginald Graham	11 and 10	(England) Claude Gray	La Boulie	
1905	(England) Arthur Crosfield	7 and 5	(England) Edgar Vincent	La Boulie	
1904	(Chile) Hector Beéche	9 and 7	(England) H. F. Overbury	La Boulie	
