= ISPS Handa World Invitational =

European golf tournament

Tournament information
- Location: Ballymena, Northern Ireland
- Established: 2019
- Courses: Galgorm Castle Golf Club; Castlerock Golf Club
- Par: 70 (G)/71 (C) (men); 72 (G)/73 (C) (women)
- Length: 7,151 yards (6,539 m) (G)/6,859 yards (6,272 m) (C) (men); 6,486 yards (5,931 m) (G)/6,231 yards (5,698 m) (C) (women)
- Tours: European Tour; Challenge Tour; LPGA Tour; Ladies European Tour
- Format: Stroke play
- Prize fund: US$1,500,000
- Month played: August
- Final year: 2023

Tournament record score
- Aggregate: 266 Dan Brown (2023)
- To par: −20 Maja Stark (2022)

Final champion
- (England) Dan Brown (United States) Alexa Pano

Location map
- Location in Northern Ireland

The ISPS Handa World Invitational was a professional golf tournament that featured on the European Tour, the Challenge Tour, the LPGA Tour and the Ladies European Tour.

== History ==
The event was created in 2019 and involved separate events for both men and women, both having the same prize money. The men's event featured on the Challenge Tour schedule. Jack Senior won the men's event in a playoff over Matthew Baldwin. Stephanie Meadow won the women's event, beating Charley Hull by one shot.

No tournament was played in 2020. In 2021, the event returned and was elevated to European Tour status for the men's event. The women's event gained co-sanctioning by the LPGA Tour and the Ladies European Tour. Daniel Gavins won the men's tournament for his first European Tour victory. Pajaree Anannarukarn won the women's tournament in a playoff over Emma Talley for her first LPGA Tour victory.

Similarly to 2021, the 2022 event again featured 132 men and 132 women for each championship. A cut to top 60 and ties after 36 holes (two rounds), then a second cut to top 35 and ties after 54 holes (three rounds). For the first two rounds, all players played one round on each course.

In 2023, Castlerock Golf Club was added as a co-host to Galgorm Castle, replacing Massereene, which had previously been used as a second venue. In August, after the release of the 2024 European Tour schedule, it was confirmed that the 2023 event would be the final edition.

== Winners ==
| Year | Tour(s) (Note: CHA − Challenge Tour; EUR − European Tour; LET − Ladies European Tour; LPGA − LPGA Tour.) | Winner | Score | To par | Margin of victory | Runner(s)-up |
|---|---|---|---|---|---|---|
| 2023 (Note: Separate tournaments played for men and women.) | EUR | (England) Dan Brown | 266 | −15 | 5 strokes | (England) Alex Fitzpatrick |
| 2023 | LET, LPGA | (United States) Alexa Pano | 281 | −8 | Playoff | (England) Gabriella Cowley (Germany) Esther Henseleit |
| 2022 | EUR | (Scotland) Ewen Ferguson | 268 | −12 | 3 strokes | (Scotland) Connor Syme (Spain) Borja Virto |
| 2022 | LET, LPGA | (Sweden) Maja Stark | 271 | −20 | 5 strokes | (United States) Allisen Corpuz |
| 2021 | EUR | (England) Daniel Gavins | 267 | −13 | 1 stroke | (England) David Horsey |
| 2021 | LET, LPGA | (Thailand) Pajaree Anannarukarn | 275 | −16 | Playoff | (United States) Emma Talley |
2020: No tournament
| 2019 | CHA | (England) Jack Senior | 269 | −11 | Playoff | (England) Matthew Baldwin |
| 2019 | | (Northern Ireland) Stephanie Meadow | 278 | −10 | 1 stroke | (England) Charley Hull |

== See also ==
- Northern Ireland Open (golf)
