= Adrien Saddier =

French professional golfer (born 1992)

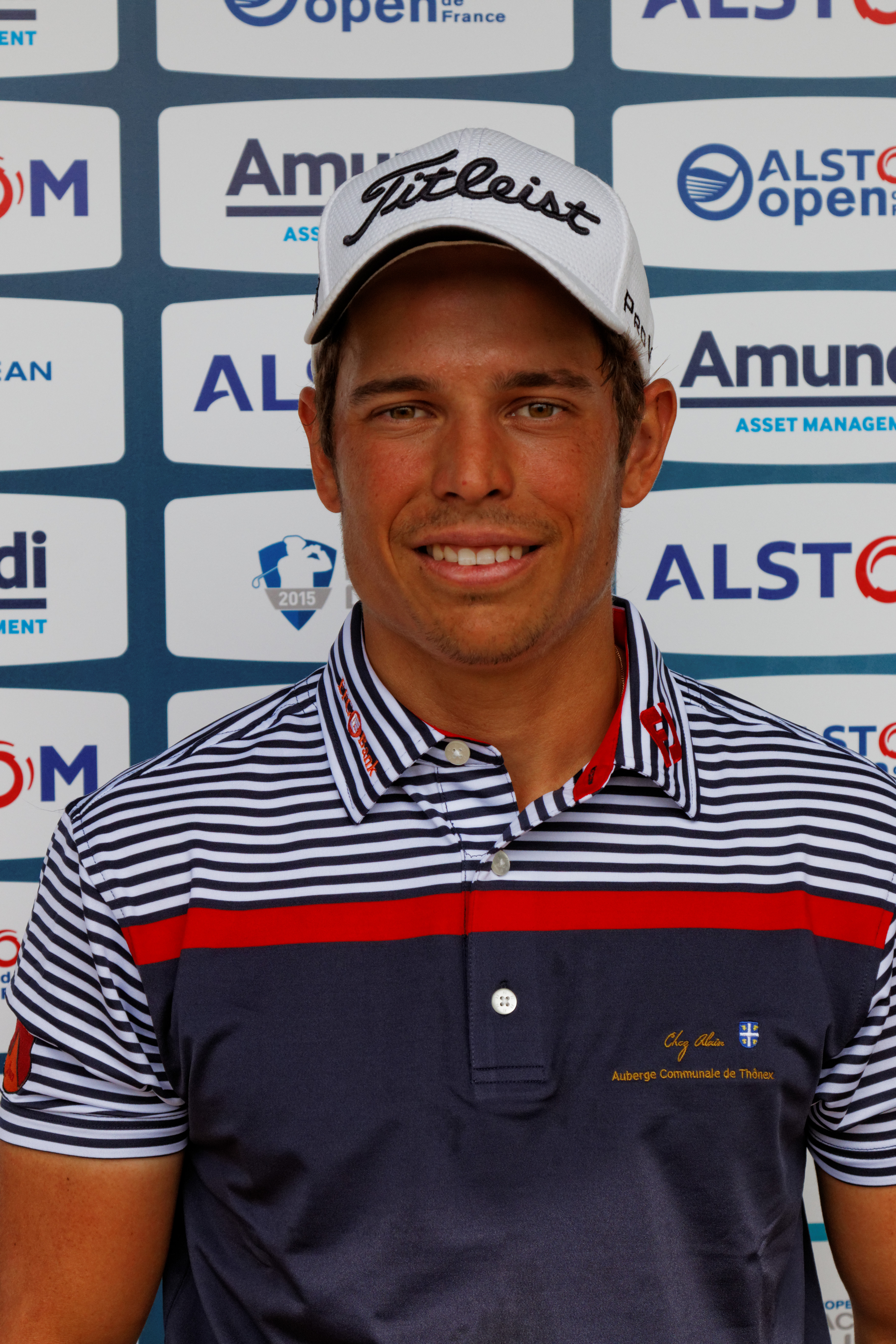

Personal information
- Nationality: France
- Born: 15 May 1992 (age 34) La Roche-sur-Foron, France
- Height: 1.80 m (5 ft 11 in)
- Weight: 79 kg (174 lb; 12.4 st)

Career
- Sport: Golf
- Turned professional: 2013
- Current tours: European Tour; PGA Tour
- Former tour: Challenge Tour
- Professional wins: 2
- Highest ranking: 73 (19 October 2025) (as of 15 November 2026)

Number of wins by tour
- European Tour: 1
- Challenge Tour: 1

Best results in major championships
- Masters Tournament: DNP
- PGA Championship: CUT: 2026
- U.S. Open: CUT: 2026
- The Open Championship: T52: 2025

Adrien Saddier (born 15 May 1992) is a French professional golfer who plays on the European Tour, where he won the 2025 Italian Open.

== Professional career ==
Saddier turned professional in 2013. He earned his card on the European Tour for 2014 by playing all three stages of qualifying school. His best finish on tour in the 2014 season was T-6 at the Nelson Mandela Championship in December 2013. He finished 127th on the Race to Dubai and played primarily on the Challenge Tour from 2015 to 2017. In 2016, Saddier won the Fred Olsen Challenge de España on the Challenge Tour for his first professional win. Saddier finished the 2016 season just outside the top 15 in the Order of Merit but three runner-up finishes during the 2017 season put him 13th in the Order of Merit to earn a place on the European Tour for 2018.

In June 2025, Saddier claimed his first European Tour win at the Italian Open, it was his 200th start on the tour. The win also earned Saddier entry into his first major, the 2025 Open Championship. At the BMW PGA Championship in September, he finished second, losing in a playoff to Alex Norén.

== Amateur wins ==
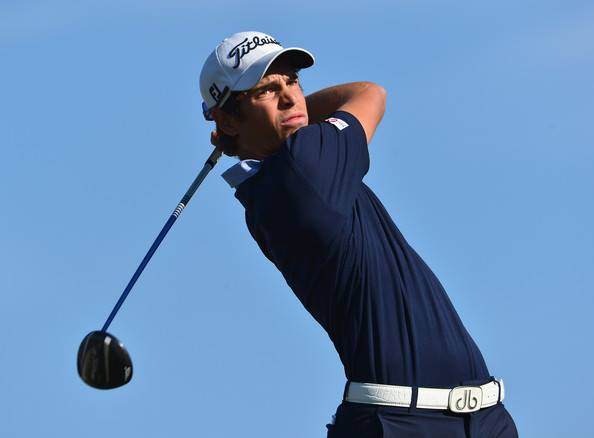

- 2010 Grand Prix de Montpellier Massane
- 2011 French Team Cup (individual), European Club Trophy (individual)
- 2012 Swiss International Amateur, Grand Prix de Savoie, European Club Trophy (individual)
- 2013 European Nations Cup (individual), Grand Prix de Haute Savoie, Internationaux de France – Coupe Murat

== Professional wins (2) ==
=== European Tour wins (1) ===
No.	Date	Tournament	Winning score	Margin of victory	Runner-up
1	29 Jun 2025	Italian Open	−14 (69-64-67-66=266)	2 strokes	(France) Martin Couvra

European Tour playoff record (0–1)

No.	Year	Tournament	Opponent	Result
1	2025	BMW PGA Championship	(Sweden) Alex Norén	Lost to birdie on first extra hole

=== Challenge Tour wins (1) ===
No.	Date	Tournament	Winning score	Margin of victory	Runner-up
1	17 Jul 2016	Fred Olsen Challenge de España	−24 (61-65-71-63=260)	3 strokes	(Italy) Nicolò Ravano

Challenge Tour playoff record (0–1)

No.	Year	Tournament	Opponent	Result
1	2017	Rolex Trophy	(Spain) Pedro Oriol	Lost to par on first extra hole

== Results in major championships ==
Tournament	2025	2026
Masters Tournament		
PGA Championship		CUT
U.S. Open		CUT
The Open Championship	T52	CUT

Did not play

CUT = missed the half-way cut
"T" = tied

== Team appearances ==
Amateur

- European Amateur Team Championship (representing France): 2013

== See also ==
- 2013 European Tour Qualifying School graduates
- 2017 Challenge Tour graduates
- 2019 European Tour Qualifying School graduates
- 2022 European Tour Qualifying School graduates
- 2025 Race to Dubai dual card winners
