= Robin Roussel =

French professional golfer (born 1993)

Personal information
- Nationality: France
- Born: 26 August 1993 (age 33) Paris, France

Career
- Sport: Golf
- Turned professional: 2016
- Current tour: Challenge Tour
- Former tours: European Tour; Alps Tour
- Professional wins: 4

Number of wins by tour
- Challenge Tour: 1
- Other: 3

Robin Roussel (born 26 August 1993) is a French professional golfer who plays on the European Tour. In May 2019, he won the Hauts de France – Pas de Calais Golf Openon the Challenge Tour.

== Professional career ==
As an amateur, Roussel reached the final stage of the 2015 European Tour Q-school after a final round 62. Although he missed the cut in the final stage, he gained a place on the 2016 Challenge Tour. He turned professional before the start of the season. Roussel only made the cut in 5 of the 15 events he played and finished 149th in the Order of Merit.

At the end of 2016, he finished 6th the Alps Tour Q-school to gain a place on the tour for 2017. He had a successful season finishing runner-up in the Saint Malo Golf Open and joint runner-up in the Lignano Open. Together with five other top-10 finishes he finished fifth in the Order of Merit to gain a place on the Challenge Tour for 2018. Roussel's second season on the Challenge Tour was more successful than his first. He made the cut in 13 of 19 events with two top-10 finishes. He finished the season 75th in the Order of Merit to retain his card for 2019.

Roussel played in the early part of the 2019 MENA Tour season, finishing runner-up in the Ghala Golf Open and winning the Troon Series – Royal Golf Bahrain Open. Rousell had top-10 finishes in his first three Challenge Tour events and in June won the Hauts de France – Pas de Calais Golf Open. He was also runner-up in the Hainan Open and finished the 2019 season 7th in the Challenge Tour Order of Merit to earn a place on the 2020 European Tour.

== Professional wins (4) ==
=== Challenge Tour wins (1) ===
No.	Date	Tournament	Winning score	Margin of victory	Runner-up
1	16 Jun 2019	Hauts de France – Pas de Calais Golf Open	−13 (70-68-67-66=271)	2 strokes	(England) Richard Bland

=== MENA Tour wins (1) ===
No.	Date	Tournament	Winning score	Margin of victory	Runners-up
1	13 Mar 2019	Troon Series – Royal Golf Bahrain Open	−12 (65-66-73=204)	1 stroke	(England) James Allan, (England) Joshua Grenville-Wood

=== French Tour wins (2) ===
No.	Date	Tournament	Winning score	Margin of victory	Runner(s)-up
1	25 Nov 2017	Internationaux de France Professionels de Double (with Ugo Coussaud)	−16 (65-70-65=200)	2 strokes	(France) Victor Riu and (France) Alexis Weizman, (France) Antoine Rozner and (France) Olivier Rozner
2	18 Jun 2022	Championnat de France Professionnel	−14 (68-67-66-69=270)	1 stroke	(France) Paul Margolis

== See also ==
- 2019 Challenge Tour graduates
