= Laurie Canter =

English professional golfer (born 1989)

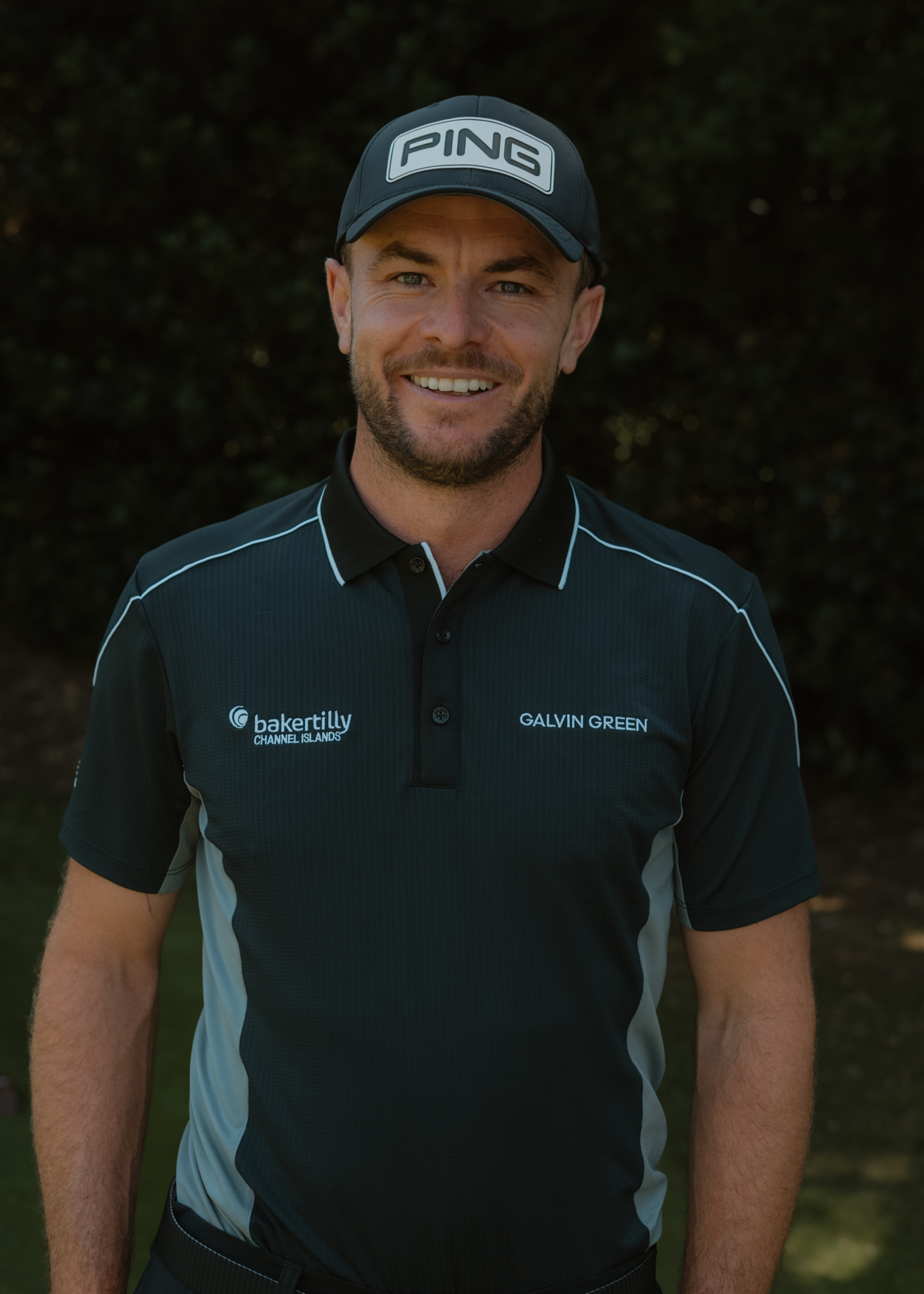
- Canter in 2025

Personal information
- Full name: Laurence Richard Canter
- Nationality: England
- Born: 3 November 1989 (age 36) Bath, Somerset, England

Career
- Sport: Golf
- Turned professional: 2011
- Current tours: European Tour; Asian Tour; LIV Golf
- Former tours: Challenge Tour; PGA EuroPro Tour
- Professional wins: 3
- Highest ranking: 42 (2 March 2025) (as of 25 October 2026)

Number of wins by tour
- European Tour: 2
- Other: 1

Best results in major championships
- Masters Tournament: CUT: 2025
- PGA Championship: T48: 2022
- U.S. Open: T43: 2026
- The Open Championship: T17: 2023

Laurence Richard Canter (born 3 November 1989) is an English professional golfer who has been ranked inside the top 50 of the Official World Golf Ranking. He has been a member of the European Tour, and also played on LIV Golf, the Asian Tour, and several lower level tours. He is a former amateur champion in both South Africa and Spain.

== Amateur career ==
Canter had a successful year in 2010, winning the South African Amateur Championship and playing in the St Andrews Trophy and Eisenhower Trophy. He was also part of the England team that won the European Amateur Team Championship that year and he also qualified for the 2010 Open Championship. He won the 2011 Spanish Amateur Open Championship.

== Professional career ==
Canter turned professional in 2011, after winning the Spanish Amateur Open Championship. He played on the Challenge Tour from 2011 to 2013 before dropping down to the Pro Golf Tour in 2014 and 2015.

Canter has an unusual records of qualifying for the European Tour through Q-school, four separate times. He qualified in 2015, 2016 and 2017 but failed to regain his place on the tour on each occasion. After a season returning to the Challenge Tour, he finished tied for 5th in the 2019 European Tour Qualifying School to gain a place on the European Tour for 2020. 2020 proved to be more successful than his previous attempts on the tour. He had his first top-10 finish in the Hero Open and followed this with a tie for 5th place in the ISPS Handa Wales Open and runner-up finishes in the Portugal Masters and the Italian Open.

He finished tied-second at the 2021 BMW PGA Championship; one shot behind Billy Horschel.

In 2022, Canter joined LIV Golf. As a result he was suspended and fined by the DP World Tour, and ultimately did not retain his exemption status at the end of the season. In 2023, he was retained as a reserve by LIV Golf. He substituted for Cleeks team captain Martin Kaymer in the first three events of the season, and subsequently for Sam Horsfield, on the Majesticks team, for several events after he withdrew injured during the fourth event in Adelaide. At the promotions event, he lost in a playoff for the final spot on a team roster for 2024. He played in the opening two events of the season as a wild card before being replaced by Anthony Kim.

In June 2024, Canter won for the first time on the European Tour, at the European Open in Germany. In February 2025, he claimed his second title, winning the Bapco Energies Bahrain Championship in a playoff with Pablo Larrazábal and Dan Brown.

In March 2025, Canter competed in The Players Championship, despite having been a LIV Golf member in the past, he became the first former LIV golfer to play in a strictly PGA Tour event.

Canter earned a PGA Tour card for 2026 by finishing 7th in the 2025 European Tour rankings. He opted not to take up PGA Tour membership and instead signed a contract to join LIV Golf in December 2025. He replaced Henrik Stenson, who had been relegated from LIV Golf.

== Amateur wins ==
- 2010 South African Amateur Championship, Hampshire Hog, West of England Amateur Stroke Play Championship
- 2011 Spanish International Amateur Championship

== Professional wins (3) ==
=== European Tour wins (2) ===
No.	Date	Tournament	Winning score	Margin of victory	Runners-up
1	2 Jun 2024	European Open	−13 (68-66-73-72=279)	2 strokes	(South Africa) Thriston Lawrence, (Austria) Bernd Wiesberger
2	2 Feb 2025	Bapco Energies Bahrain Championship	−14 (68-69-68-69=274)	Playoff	(England) Dan Brown, (Spain) Pablo Larrazábal

European Tour playoff record (1–1)

No.	Year	Tournament	Opponent(s)	Result
1	2025	Bapco Energies Bahrain Championship	(England) Dan Brown, (Spain) Pablo Larrazábal	Won with birdie on first extra hole
2	2025	Investec South African Open Championship	(South Africa) Dylan Naidoo	Lost to birdie on first extra hole

=== Jamega Pro Golf Tour wins (1) ===
No.	Date	Tournament	Winning score	Margin of victory	Runners-up
1	15 Sep 2015	The Players Club	−12 (67-65=132)	Playoff	(England) Jack Heasman, (England) Bradley Moore (a)

== Playoff record ==
Challenge Tour playoff record (0–1)

No.	Year	Tournament	Opponent	Result
1	2019	KPMG Trophy	(England) Dale Whitnell	Lost to birdie on second extra hole

== Results in major championships ==
Results not in chronological order in 2020.

Tournament	2010	2011	2012	2013	2014	2015	2016	2017	2018
Masters Tournament									
U.S. Open									
The Open Championship	CUT							T37	
PGA Championship									

Tournament	2019	2020	2021	2022	2023	2024	2025	2026
Masters Tournament							CUT	
PGA Championship				T48			CUT	
U.S. Open							T55	T43
The Open Championship		NT		T79	T17	T25	CUT	T71

Did not play

CUT = missed the halfway cut
"T" = tied
NT = no tournament due to COVID-19 pandemic

=== Summary ===
Tournament	Wins	2nd	3rd	Top-5	Top-10	Top-25	Events	Cuts made
Masters Tournament	0	0	0	0	0	0	1	0
PGA Championship	0	0	0	0	0	0	2	1
U.S. Open	0	0	0	0	0	0	2	2
The Open Championship	0	0	0	0	0	2	7	5
Totals	0	0	0	0	0	2	12	8

- Most consecutive cuts made – 5 (2017 Open Championship – 2024 Open Championship)

== Results in The Players Championship ==
Tournament	2025
The Players Championship	CUT

CUT = missed the half-way cut

== Results in World Golf Championships ==
Tournament	2021
Championship	T64
Match Play	
Invitational	
Champions	NT^{1}

^{1}Cancelled due to COVID-19 pandemic

Did not play

"T" = Tied
NT = No tournament

== Team appearances ==
Amateur

- St Andrews Trophy (representing Great Britain & Ireland): 2010
- European Amateur Team Championship (representing England): 2010 (winners)
- Eisenhower Trophy (representing England): 2010

Professional

- Team Cup (representing Great Britain and Ireland): 2025 (winners)

== See also ==
- 2015 European Tour Qualifying School graduates
- 2016 European Tour Qualifying School graduates
- 2017 European Tour Qualifying School graduates
- 2019 European Tour Qualifying School graduates
- 2025 Race to Dubai dual card winners
