= Jordan Gumberg =

American professional golfer (born 1995)

Personal information
- Nationality: United States
- Born: April 14, 1995 (age 31) Fort Lauderdale, Florida, U.S.
- Height: 5 ft 10 in (1.78 m)
- Weight: 165 lb (75 kg)

Career
- Sport: Golf
- College: University of Tennessee; University of Arizona
- Turned professional: 2017
- Current tour: European Tour
- Former tours: Challenge Tour; Korn Ferry Tour; PGA Tour Latinoamérica
- Professional wins: 2

Number of wins by tour
- European Tour: 2
- Sunshine Tour: 1

Best results in major championships
- Masters Tournament: DNP
- PGA Championship: CUT: 2026
- U.S. Open: CUT: 2023
- The Open Championship: DNP

Jordan Gumberg (born April 14, 1995) is an American professional golfer who plays on the European Tour. He won the 2024 SDC Championship in South Africa.

== Early life and amateur career ==
Gumberg was born in Fort Lauderdale, Florida and his father introduced him to golf at age two. He played college golf at the University of Tennessee in the 2014–15 season, and transferred to the University of Arizona where he played for the 2015–16 and 2016–17 seasons. He was solo runner-up at the 2016 individual Pac-12 Conference Championship, behind Jon Rahm.

== Professional career ==
Gumberg turned professional in 2017 and played limited schedules on the PGA Tour Latinoamérica and Korn Ferry Tour before he joined the Challenge Tour in 2022.

In 2023, Gumberg finished T-2 at the Irish Challenge and followed that up with a T-3 in the Scottish Challenge to finish the season in the top-45, earning status on the 2024 European Tour. He was medalist at the Wellington National Golf Club qualifier to earn a spot in the 2023 U.S. Open at Los Angeles Country Club.

In March 2024, Gumberg defeated Robin Williams in a sudden-death playoff at the SDC Championship, an event co-sanctioned by the European Tour and the Sunshine Tour.

== Amateur wins ==
- 2016 Wyoming Cowboy Classic

== Professional wins (2) ==
=== European Tour wins (2) ===
No.	Date	Tournament	Winning score	Margin of victory	Runner-up
1	Mar 3, 2024	SDC Championship^{1}	−12 (68-69-71-68=276)	Playoff	(South Africa) Robin Williams
2	Mar 22, 2026	Hainan Classic^{2}	−19 (64-66-69-70=269)	1 stroke	(Spain) Jorge Campillo

^{1}Co-sanctioned by the Sunshine Tour
^{2}Co-sanctioned by the China Tour

European Tour playoff record (1–0)

No.	Year	Tournament	Opponent	Result
1	2024	SDC Championship	(South Africa) Robin Williams	Won with birdie on second extra hole

== Results in major championships ==
Tournament	2023	2024	2025	2026
Masters Tournament				
PGA Championship				CUT
U.S. Open	CUT			
The Open Championship				

Did not play

CUT = missed the half-way cut
