= Dan Brown (golfer) =

English professional golfer (born 1994)

Personal information
- Full name: Daniel Brown
- Nationality: England
- Born: 11 October 1994 (age 32) Northallerton, England

Career
- Sport: Golf
- Turned professional: 2017
- Current tours: PGA Tour; European Tour
- Former tours: Challenge Tour; PGA EuroPro Tour
- Professional wins: 4
- Highest ranking: 67 (18 January 2026) (as of 15 November 2026)

Number of wins by tour
- European Tour: 2
- Other: 2

Best results in major championships
- Masters Tournament: DNP
- PGA Championship: T75: 2026
- U.S. Open: DNP
- The Open Championship: T10: 2024

Daniel Brown (born 11 October 1994) is an English professional golfer who plays on the European Tour. He claimed his first win on the tour at the 2023 ISPS Handa World Invitational.

== Early life ==
Brown was born in Northallerton, England

== Professional career ==
After reaching the final stage of the European Tour Qualifying School in 2017 but failing to qualify, Brown played a limited schedule on the Challenge Tour in 2018 but made only two cuts in 13 events. From 2019 to 2021, Brown played on the PGA EuroPro Tour. In 2021, he tied for second in the season-ending event and finished fourth in the Order of Merit, earning a return to the Challenge Tour. He finished 30th in the 2022 Challenge Tour rankings, highlighted by a runner-up finish at the Hopps Open de Provence in October. In November, Brown finished third at the European Tour Qualifying School to claim a European Tour card for the 2023 season.

In August 2023, Brown claimed his first win on the European Tour at the ISPS Handa World Invitational in Northern Ireland. He won wire-to-wire, five shots ahead of Alex Fitzpatrick.

In July 2024, he made his major championship debut at the 2024 Open Championship after earning a place in the field through final qualifying, and had the lead after the first round after a bogey-free 65.

In July 2025, Brown won the BMW International Open by two shots over Jordan Smith. He earned a PGA Tour card following the 2025 DP World Tour season. Brown had originally finished 11th among those not otherwise exempt, with the top 10 earning PGA Tour cards. However, he earned the 10th spot after Laurie Canter opted instead to rejoin LIV Golf.

== Amateur wins ==
- 2015 Dutch Junior Open
- 2016 English Amateur, North of England Open Amateur Championship

== Professional wins (4) ==
=== European Tour wins (2) ===
| No. | Date | Tournament | Winning score | Margin of victory | Runner-up |
|---|---|---|---|---|---|
| 1 | 20 Aug 2023 | ISPS Handa World Invitational | −15 (64-66-67-69=266) | 5 strokes | (England) Alex Fitzpatrick |
| 2 | 6 Jul 2025 | BMW International Open | −22 (70-65-65-66=266) | 2 strokes | (England) Jordan Smith |

European Tour playoff record (0–2)

| No. | Year | Tournament | Opponent(s) | Result |
|---|---|---|---|---|
| 1 | 2025 | Bapco Energies Bahrain Championship | (England) Laurie Canter, (Spain) Pablo Larrazábal | Canter won with birdie on first extra hole |
| 2 | 2025 | Open de España | (England) Marco Penge | Lost to birdie on first extra hole |

=== Evolve Pro Tour wins (2) ===
| No. | Date | Tournament | Winning score | Margin of victory | Runners-up |
|---|---|---|---|---|---|
| 1 | 9 Feb 2018 | Lo Romero | −13 (68-64-71=203) | 6 strokes | (Sweden) Oliver Jacobsson, (Republic of Ireland) Brendan McCarroll |
| 2 | 21 Feb 2018 | La Serena Open | −12 (70-68-66=204) | 2 strokes | (Norway) Eirik Tage Johansen, (Republic of Ireland) Brendan McCarroll, (England) Liam Murray |

== Results in major championships ==
| Tournament | 2024 | 2025 | 2026 |
|---|---|---|---|
| Masters Tournament | | | |
| PGA Championship | | | T75 |
| U.S. Open | | | |
| The Open Championship | T10 | CUT | T18 |

Top 10
Did not play

CUT = missed the half way cut
"T" indicates a tie for a place

== See also ==
- 2022 European Tour Qualifying School graduates
- 2025 Race to Dubai dual card winners
