= 2023–24 Big Easy Tour =

Golf tour season

2023–24 Big Easy Tour season
- Duration: 4 July 2023 – 18 April 2024
- Number of official events: 12
- Order of Merit: (South Africa) Leon Vorster

The 2023–24 Big Easy Tour, titled as the 2023–24 Altron Big Easy Tour for sponsorship reasons, was the 12th season of the Big Easy Tour, the official development tour to the Sunshine Tour.

== Schedule ==
The following table lists official events during the 2023–24 season.

| Date | Tournament | Location | Purse (R) | Winner (Note: The number in brackets after each winner's name is the number of Big Easy Tour events they had won up to and including that tournament. It is rare for someone to accumulate many wins on the Big Easy Tour as success at this level usually leads to promotion to the Sunshine Tour.) | OWGR points |
|---|---|---|---|---|---|
| 6 Jul | Altron Big Easy Tour 1 | Gauteng | 150,000 | (Portugal) Nicholaus Frade (1) | 0.39 |
| 13 Jul | Altron Big Easy Tour 2 | Gauteng | 150,000 | (South Africa) Keegan McLachlan (1) | 0.34 |
| 3 Aug | Altron Big Easy Tour 3 | Gauteng | 150,000 | (South Africa) Robin Williams (1) | 0.30 |
| 23 Aug | Altron Big Easy Tour 4 | Gauteng | 150,000 | (South Africa) Andre van Dyk (1) | 0.25 |
| 8 Nov | Altron Big Easy Tour 5 | Gauteng | 150,000 | (South Africa) Travis Ladner (1) | 0.26 |
| 16 Nov | Altron Big Easy Tour 6 | Gauteng | 150,000 | (South Africa) Andrew Williamson (1) | 0.31 |
| 13 Dec | Altron Big Easy Tour 7 | Gauteng | 150,000 | (South Africa) Samuel Simpson (1) | 0.32 |
| 11 Jan | Altron Big Easy Tour 8 | Gauteng | 150,000 | (South Africa) Toto Thimba Jr. (3) | 0.33 |
| 18 Jan | Altron Big Easy Tour 9 | Gauteng | 150,000 | (South Africa) Reece McKain (1) | 0.39 |
| 14 Mar | Altron Big Easy Tour 10 | Gauteng | 150,000 | (South Africa) Therion Nel (2) | 0.45 |
| 12 Apr | Altron Big Easy Tour Play Off | Gauteng | 250,000 | (South Africa) Dylan O'Leary (1) | 0.28 |
| 18 Apr | Altron Big Easy Tour Final | Gauteng | 300,000 | (South Africa) Leon Vorster (1) | 0.21 |

== Order of Merit ==
The Order of Merit was based on tournament results during the season, calculated using a points-based system. The top 10 players on the Order of Merit (not otherwise exempt) earned status to play on the 2024–25 Sunshine Tour.

| Position | Player | Points |
|---|---|---|
| 1 | (South Africa) Leon Vorster | 729 |
| 2 | (South Africa) Samuel Simpson | 728 |
| 3 | (South Africa) Werner Deyzel | 726 |
| 4 | (South Africa) Stals Swart | 709 |
| 5 | (South Africa) Ricky Hendler | 615 |
| 6 | (South Africa) Ruan de Smidt | 602 |
| 7 | (South Africa) Dylan O'Leary | 557 |
| 8 | (Zambia) Dayne Moore | 549 |
| 9 | (South Africa) Travis Ladner | 488 |
| 10 | (South Africa) Andre de Decker | 462 |
| 11 | (South Africa) Therion Nel | 453 |
| 12 | (South Africa) Vaughn van Deventer | 436 |
