= China Classic =

Golf tournament

Coordinates: 19.911°N 110.239°E

Hainan Classic
Tournament information
- Location: Hainan Island, China
- Established: 2025
- Courses: Mission Hills Resort Haikou; Blackstone Course
- Par: 72
- Length: 7,711 yards (7,051 m)
- Tours: European Tour; China Tour
- Format: Stroke play
- Prize fund: US$2,550,000
- Month played: April

Tournament record score
- Aggregate: 269 Jordan Gumberg (2026)
- To par: −19 as above

Current champion
- (United States) Jordan Gumberg

Location map
- Location in the China

The Hainan Classic is a professional golf tournament held at Blackstone Course, Mission Hills Resort Haikou in Hainan Island, China.

The event is played at the same venue which hosted the 2011 World Cup of Golf and feature on the China Tour and European Tour.

Marco Penge won the inaugural event, beating Sean Crocker and Kristoffer Reitan by three shots.

== Winners ==
Year	Tours (Note: CHN − China Tour; EUR − European Tour.)	Winner	Score	To par	Margin of victory	Runner(s)-up
2026	CHN, EUR	(United States) Jordan Gumberg	269	−19	1 stroke	(Spain) Jorge Campillo
2025	CHN, EUR	(England) Marco Penge	271	−17	3 strokes	(United States) Sean Crocker (Norway) Kristoffer Reitan
