= SDC Championship =

Coordinates: 34.162°S 24.815°E

Tournament information
- Location: St Francis Bay, Eastern Cape, South Africa
- Established: 2023
- Course: St Francis Links
- Par: 72
- Length: 7,192 yards (6,576 m)
- Tours: European Tour; Sunshine Tour
- Format: Stroke play
- Prize fund: US$1,500,000
- Month played: March
- Final year: 2024

Tournament record score
- Aggregate: 270 Matthew Baldwin (2023)
- To par: −18 as above

Final champion
- (United States) Jordan Gumberg

Location map
- Location in South Africa Location in Eastern Cape

The SDC Championship was a professional golf tournament held at St Francis Links in St Francis Bay, South Africa.

The tournament was introduced for the 2023 season as a co-sanctioned European Tour and Sunshine Tour event.

Matthew Baldwin won the inaugural event, shooting 18 under par to win by seven shots ahead of Adri Arnaus.

== Winners ==
Year	Tours (Note: AFR − Sunshine Tour; EUR − European Tour.)	Winner	Score	To par	Margin of victory	Runner-up
2024	AFR, EUR	(United States) Jordan Gumberg	276	−12	Playoff	(South Africa) Robin Williams
2023	AFR, EUR	(England) Matthew Baldwin	270	−18	7 strokes	(Spain) Adri Arnaus
