= Kristoffer Reitan =

Norwegian professional golfer (born 1998)

Personal information
- Nationality: Norway
- Born: 8 March 1998 (age 28) Oslo, Norway
- Height: 6 ft 1 in (185 cm)
- Weight: 182 lb (83 kg)

Career
- Sport: Golf
- College: University of Texas at Austin
- Turned professional: 2018
- Current tours: European Tour; PGA Tour
- Former tour: Challenge Tour
- Professional wins: 4
- Highest ranking: 24 (7 June 2026) (as of 15 November 2026)

Number of wins by tour
- PGA Tour: 1
- European Tour: 2
- Sunshine Tour: 1
- Challenge Tour: 1

Best results in major championships
- Masters Tournament: T41: 2026
- PGA Championship: T44: 2026
- U.S. Open: CUT: 2018, 2026
- The Open Championship: T18: 2026

Kristoffer Reitan (born 8 March 1998) is a Norwegian professional golfer who plays on the PGA Tour and the European Tour. In 2018, he become the first Norwegian to play in the U.S. Open. He won the 2024 Rolex Challenge Tour Grand Final to earn promotion to the European Tour, where he won twice in 2025 and attained PGA Tour membership. Reitan won his first PGA Tour title at the 2026 Truist Championship.

== Early life and amateur career ==
Kristoffer Reitan was born on 8 March 1998 in Oslo, Norway. He is a grandson of Odd Reitan, who formed the Reitan conglomerate and became one of Norway's wealthiest businessmen. Kristoffer's father, Magnus Reitan, was also involved in the Reitan business and was an avid golfer. He introduced Kristoffer to the game as a child. In addition to golf, Kristoffer played football during his youth. His mother Siv is a trained nurse, and he has one sibling, a younger sister Viktoria who is a singer under the name of "bby ivy".

Reitan had a successful amateur career and won the Valderrama Boys Invitational, Italian International U16 Championship, Skandia Junior Open and the Junior Orange Bowl Championship. As part of the national team he represented Norway at the European Young Masters, European Boys' Team Championship and the European Amateur Team Championship. At the 2017 European Amateur Team Champiopnship, Reitan finished individual leader at the initial 36-hole strokeplay competitition.

In 2014, he won the Toyota Junior Golf World Cup together with Viktor Hovland. He teamed up with Hovland again for the 2018 Eisenhower Trophy, where they finished fifth. He also represented Europe at the 2018 Junior Ryder Cup and 2018 Bonallack Trophy, and won the 2016 Jacques Léglise Trophy. Reitan reached the quarterfinals of the U.S. Junior Amateur in 2015, where he lost to eventual champion Philip Barbaree. Hovland caddied for Reitan during the event. He finished runner-up at the opening event of the 2017 Nordic Golf League, behind Florian Fritsch.

Reitan signed a letter of intent to play college golf for the University of Texas at Austin starting in the fall of 2017. In spring 2017 Golfweek reported that he had decided to forego college and turn professional instead, but he ultimately played the fall 2017 semester for the Longhorns.

Still a 20-year-old amateur, Reitan secured a spot at the 2018 U.S. Open through the Walton Heath Golf Club sectional qualifier, to become the first Norwegian to play in the U.S. Open.

== Professional career ==
Reitan turned professional after he earned the 26th card at the 2018 European Tour Qualifying School, the only amateur to earn a card.

In his rookie season on the European Tour, his best finish was a tie for fifth at the ISPS Handa World Super 6 Perth in Australia, where he shared the lead after round one. He ended the season 141st in the rankings, retaining conditional status.

He tied for 5th at the 2020 Italian Open. In 2024, after joining the Challenge Tour, he was 3rd at the Blot Open de Bretagne, runner-up at the Swiss Challenge, and won the Rolex Challenge Tour Grand Final, to graduate to the European Tour by finishing 7th in the rankings.

In April 2025, he was runner-up at the Hainan Classic in China, three strokes behind Marco Penge. In May, he claimed his first European Tour title, at the Soudal Open. Starting the final round nine strokes off the lead, Reitan shot a course-record 62 and posted 13-under for the tournament to ultimately enter a three-man playoff. Reitan birdied the second extra hole to defeat Darius van Driel and 54-hole leader Ewen Ferguson. After another runner-up finish at the Austrian Alpine Open, following a 60 in the final round, Reitan rose into the top-100 of the Official World Golf Rankings for the first time. Reitan ended the season at 8th in the Race to Dubai rankings and earned playing status for the 2026 PGA Tour season.

At the Nedbank Golf Challenge in December 2025, Reitan opened with a 9-under 63 to take the first-round lead. He held a five-stroke lead after 54 holes and shot a 72 in the final round to complete a wire-to-wire victory, finishing one stroke ahead of Dan Bradbury and Jayden Schaper.

In April 2026, Reitan and fellow Norwegian Kris Ventura finished tied-second at the Zurich Classic, a team event on the PGA Tour. They combined for a score of 30-under, one stroke behind the winning team of Alex Fitzpatrick and Matt Fitzpatrick. The following month, Reitan earned his first PGA Tour win at the Truist Championship. He shot 15-under 269 at Quail Hollow Club to finish two strokes ahead of Rickie Fowler and Nicolai Højgaard. With the victory, Reitan earned $3.6 million and moved to a career-high of 25th in the Official World Golf Ranking.

== Amateur wins ==
- 2013 Valderrama Boys Invitational, Italian International U16 Championship
- 2014 Skandia Junior Open
- 2015 Junior Orange Bowl Championship

== Professional wins (4) ==
=== PGA Tour wins (1) ===
Legend
Signature events (1)
Other PGA Tour (0)

No.	Date	Tournament	Winning score	Margin of victory	Runners-up
1	10 May 2026	Truist Championship	−15 (66-70-64-69=269)	2 strokes	(United States) Rickie Fowler, (Denmark) Nicolai Højgaard

=== European Tour wins (2) ===
No.	Date	Tournament	Winning score	Margin of victory	Runners-up
1	25 May 2025	Soudal Open	−13 (71-66-72-62=271)	Playoff	(Scotland) Ewen Ferguson, (Netherlands) Darius van Driel
2	7 Dec 2025 (2026 season)	Nedbank Golf Challenge^{1}	−17 (63-69-67-72=271)	1 stroke	(England) Dan Bradbury, (South Africa) Jayden Schaper

^{1}Co-sanctioned by the Sunshine Tour

European Tour playoff record (1–0)

No.	Year	Tournament	Opponents	Result
1	2025	Soudal Open	(Scotland) Ewen Ferguson, (Netherlands) Darius van Driel	Won with birdie on second extra hole

=== Challenge Tour wins (1) ===
Legend
Tour Championships (1)
Other Challenge Tour (0)

No.	Date	Tournament	Winning score	Margin of victory	Runners-up
1	3 Nov 2024	Rolex Challenge Tour Grand Final	−23 (65-64-68-68=265)	1 stroke	(Spain) Ángel Ayora, (Denmark) Rasmus Neergaard-Petersen

== Results in major championships ==
Tournament	2018	2025	2026
Masters Tournament			T41
PGA Championship			T44
U.S. Open	CUT		CUT
The Open Championship		T30	T18

Did not play

CUT = missed the half-way cut
T = tied

== Team appearances ==
Amateur

- European Young Masters (representing Norway): 2013, 2014
- European Boys' Team Championship (representing Norway): 2013, 2014, 2015, 2016
- Junior Golf World Cup (representing Norway): 2014 (winners), 2015
- Jacques Léglise Trophy (representing Continental Europe): 2014, 2015, 2016 (winners)
- European Amateur Team Championship (representing Norway): 2017
- Bonallack Trophy (representing Europe): 2018
- Junior Ryder Cup (representing Europe): 2018
- Eisenhower Trophy (representing Norway): 2018

== See also ==
- 2018 European Tour Qualifying School graduates
- 2024 Challenge Tour graduates
- 2025 Race to Dubai dual card winners
