= 2025 European Tour =

Golf tour season

2025 European Tour season
- Duration: 21 November 2024 – 16 November 2025
- Number of official events: 42 (Note: One further tournament was cancelled.)
- Most wins: (England) Marco Penge (3)
- Race to Dubai: (Northern Ireland) Rory McIlroy
- Player of the Year: (England) Marco Penge
- Sir Henry Cotton Rookie of the Year: (France) Martin Couvra

The 2025 European Tour, titled as the 2025 DP World Tour for sponsorship reasons, was the 54th season of the European Tour, the main professional golf tour in Europe since its inaugural season in 1972.

It was the fourth season of the tour under a title sponsorship agreement with DP World that was announced in November 2021.

== Changes for 2025 ==
The initial part of the schedule was announced in August 2024, with the "Opening Swing" events confirmed. Tournaments in Australia and Southern Africa were confirmed, with the return of the Nedbank Golf Challenge, which had not been part of the 2024 season due to scheduling changes. The Joburg Open and the Investec South African Open Championship were dropped from the Opening Swing, being rescheduled to March. The remainder of the schedule was announced in November 2024. As part of the announcement, it was confirmed that the Turkish Open and Austrian Open would return to the schedule for the first time since 2019 and 2021, respectively.

- Several tournaments held in 2024 were not included in the schedule announcement: the Dubai Invitational (played biannually), the Commercial Bank Qatar Masters, the SDC Championship, the Jonsson Workwear Open, the ISPS Handa Championship, the European Open, the Volvo Car Scandinavian Mixed and the Estrella Damm N.A. Andalucía Masters. The Commercial Bank Qatar Masters was later added to the schedule.
  - In December 2024, it was reported by Czech Television that the 2025 D+D Real Czech Masters would not take place after being originally scheduled for 7–10 August. This was due to the tournament promoters being unable to find a suitable venue.
  - In May 2025, the tour announced that the dates vacated by the Czech Masters would be filled by the returning Scottish Championship, previously held just once in 2020. In July, Nexo was announced as the tournament title sponsor, with it being renamed the Nexo Championship.

== Schedule ==
The following table lists official events during the 2025 season.

Date	Tournament	Host country	Purse (US$)	R2D points	Winner (Note: The number in brackets after each winner's name is the number of European Tour events they had won up to and including that tournament. This information is only shown for European Tour members.)	OWGR points	Other tours (Note: AFR − Sunshine Tour; ANZ − PGA Tour of Australasia; CHN − China Tour; KOR − Korean Tour; PGAT − PGA Tour; PGTI − Professional Golf Tour of India.)	Notes
24 Nov	BMW Australian PGA Championship	Australia	A$2,000,000	3,000	(Australia) Elvis Smylie (1)	13.03	ANZ	
1 Dec	ISPS Handa Australian Open	Australia	A$1,700,000	3,000	(United States) Ryggs Johnston (1)	13.56	ANZ	
8 Dec	Nedbank Golf Challenge	South Africa	6,000,000	4,000	(United States) Johannes Veerman (2)	20.90	AFR	Limited-field event
15 Dec	Alfred Dunhill Championship	South Africa	€1,500,000	3,000	(South Africa) Shaun Norris (2)	17.78	AFR	
22 Dec	AfrAsia Bank Mauritius Open	Mauritius	1,500,000	3,000	(England) John Parry (2)	10.95	AFR	
19 Jan	Hero Dubai Desert Classic	UAE	9,000,000	8,000	(England) Tyrrell Hatton (8)	34.36		Rolex Series
26 Jan	Ras Al Khaimah Championship	UAE	2,500,000	3,500	(Spain) Alejandro del Rey (1)	23.20		
2 Feb	Bapco Energies Bahrain Championship	Bahrain	2,500,000	3,500	(England) Laurie Canter (2)	21.26		
9 Feb	Commercial Bank Qatar Masters	Qatar	2,500,000	3,500	(China) Li Haotong (4)	20.13		
23 Feb	Magical Kenya Open	Kenya	2,500,000	3,500	(South Africa) Jacques Kruyswijk (1)	14.50		
2 Mar	Investec South African Open Championship	South Africa	1,500,000	3,000	(South Africa) Dylan Naidoo (1)	15.59	AFR	
9 Mar	Joburg Open	South Africa	R20,500,000	3,000	(Scotland) Calum Hill (2)	15.02	AFR	
23 Mar	Porsche Singapore Classic	Singapore	2,500,000	3,500	(England) Richard Mansell (1)	19.79		
30 Mar	Hero Indian Open	India	2,250,000	3,500	(Spain) Eugenio Chacarra (1)	15.91	PGTI	
13 Apr	Masters Tournament	United States	21,000,000	10,000	(Northern Ireland) Rory McIlroy (19)	100		Major championship
20 Apr	Volvo China Open	China	2,550,000	3,500	(China) Wu Ashun (5)	16.75	CHN	
27 Apr	Hainan Classic	China	2,550,000	3,500	(England) Marco Penge (1)	16.37	CHN	New tournament
11 May	Turkish Airlines Open	Turkey	2,750,000	3,500	(France) Martin Couvra (1)	19.28		
18 May	PGA Championship	United States	19,000,000	10,000	(United States) Scottie Scheffler (n/a)	100		Major championship
25 May	Soudal Open	Belgium	2,750,000	3,500	(Norway) Kristoffer Reitan (1)	22.39		
1 Jun	Austrian Alpine Open	Austria	2,750,000	3,500	(Germany) Nicolai von Dellingshausen (1)	20.82		
8 Jun	KLM Open	Netherlands	2,750,000	3,500	(Scotland) Connor Syme (1)	21.13		
15 Jun	U.S. Open	United States	21,500,000	10,000	(United States) J. J. Spaun (n/a)	100		Major championship
29 Jun	Italian Open	Italy	3,000,000	3,500	(France) Adrien Saddier (1)	20.82		
6 Jul	BMW International Open	Germany	2,750,000	3,500	(England) Dan Brown (2)	26.55		
13 Jul	Genesis Scottish Open	Scotland	9,000,000	8,000	(United States) Chris Gotterup (n/a)	69.65	PGAT	Rolex Series
13 Jul	ISCO Championship	United States	4,000,000	3,500	(United States) William Mouw (n/a)	24.28	PGAT	
20 Jul	The Open Championship	Northern Ireland	17,000,000	10,000	(United States) Scottie Scheffler (n/a)	100		Major championship
20 Jul	Barracuda Championship	United States	4,000,000	3,500	(United States) Ryan Gerard (1)	28.23	PGAT	
~~10 Aug~~	D+D Real Czech Masters	Czech Republic	–	–	Cancelled	–		
10 Aug	Nexo Championship	Scotland	2,750,000	3,500	(Scotland) Grant Forrest (2)	18.67		
17 Aug	Danish Golf Championship	Denmark	2,750,000	3,500	(England) Marco Penge (2)	19.18		
24 Aug	Betfred British Masters	England	3,500,000	5,000	(Sweden) Alex Norén (11)	27.61		
31 Aug	Omega European Masters	Switzerland	3,250,000	5,000	(South Africa) Thriston Lawrence (5)	25.65		
7 Sep	Amgen Irish Open	Ireland	6,000,000	5,000	(Northern Ireland) Rory McIlroy (20)	34.42		
14 Sep	BMW PGA Championship	England	9,000,000	8,000	(Sweden) Alex Norén (12)	50.24		Rolex Series
21 Sep	FedEx Open de France	France	3,250,000	5,000	(United States) Michael Kim (1)	25.90		
5 Oct	Alfred Dunhill Links Championship	Scotland	5,000,000	5,000	(Scotland) Robert MacIntyre (4)	33.87		
12 Oct	Open de España	Spain	3,250,000	5,000	(England) Marco Penge (3)	28.00		
19 Oct	DP World India Championship	India	4,000,000	5,000	(England) Tommy Fleetwood (8)	25.51	PGTI	New tournament
26 Oct	Genesis Championship	South Korea	4,000,000	5,000	(South Korea) Lee Jung-hwan (1)	21.25	KOR	
9 Nov	Abu Dhabi HSBC Championship	UAE	9,000,000	9,000	(England) Aaron Rai (3)	35.62		Playoff event (Note: Also a Rolex Series tournament.)
16 Nov	DP World Tour Championship	UAE	10,000,000	12,000	(England) Matt Fitzpatrick (10)	32.20		Playoff event

=== Unofficial events ===
The following events were sanctioned by the European Tour, but did not carry official money, nor were wins official.

Date	Tournament	Host country	Purse	Winners	OWGR points	Notes
12 Jan	Team Cup	UAE	n/a	Team GB&I	n/a	Team event
28 Sep	Ryder Cup	United States	n/a	Team Europe	n/a	Team event

== Race to Dubai ==
=== Points distribution ===
The distribution of Race to Dubai points for 2025 European Tour events were as follows:

Finishing position	Total pts	1st	2nd	3rd	4th	5th	6th	7th	8th	9th	10th	20th	30th	40th	50th	60th
Major championships	10,000	1,665	1,113	627	500	424	350	300	250	223	200	120	90	68	48	30
Rolex Series	8,000	1,335	889	500	400	339	280	240	200	178	160	96	72	54	38	24
Back 9 tournaments	5,000	835	555	312	250	212	176	150	125	112	100	60	45	34	24	15
Nedbank Golf Challenge	4,000	665	445	251	200	170	140	120	100	90	80	48	36	27	19	12
Regular tournaments (Note: Tournaments with purses of $2,000,000 and above.)	3,500	585	389	219	175	148	122	105	87	78	70	42	32	24	17	11
Other regular tournaments (Note: Tournaments with purses below $2,000,000.)	3,000	500	334	188	150	127	105	90	75	67	60	36	27	20	14	9
Abu Dhabi HSBC Championship	9,000	1,500	1,000	565	450	381	315	270	225	201	180	108	81	61	43	27
DP World Tour Championship	12,000	2,000	1,335	752	600	509	420	359	300	267	240	144	108	82	58	36

=== Final standings ===
The Race to Dubai was based on tournament results during the season, calculated using a points-based system.

Pos.	Player	Majors				Rolex Series					Top 10s in other ET events								Total pts	Tmts	Money (Note: In addition to tournament prize money, the top 10 point scorers received a share of a $6m bonus pool.)	
Pos.	Player	Mas	PGA	USO	Opn	Dub	Sco	BMW PGA	Abu	DPW TC	1	2	3	4	5	6	7	8	Total pts	Tmts	Reg. (€m)	Bon. ($m)
1	(Northern Ireland) McIlroy	1st 1665	T47; 52	T19; 119	T7; 258	T4; 370	T2; 695	T20; 92	T3; 508	2nd 1335	1st 835								5,975	11	7.96	2.00
2	(England) Penge	•	T28; 90	•	CUT; 0	•	T2; 695	T13; 113	T9; 182	T22; 135	3rd 188	1st 585	1st 585	T6; 163	T8; 103	1st 835			4,008	26	2.85	1.00
3	(England) M. Fitzpatrick	T40; 67	T8; 181	T38; 69	T4; 425	•	T4; 370	T5; 233	T32; 71	1st 2000	T6; 163	5th 212							3,841	11	4.66	0.75
4	(England) Hatton	T14; 135	T60; 27	T4; 425	T16; 126	1st 1335	•	T5; 233	T41; 53	T14; 180	2nd 555								3,099	10	3.58	0.55
5	(England) Fleetwood	T21; 110	T41; 61	CUT; 0	T16; 126	T21; 88	T34; 58	T46; 39	2nd 1000	T3; 570	1st 835								2,937	11	2.47	0.45
6	(Scotland) MacIntyre	CUT; 0	T47; 52	2nd 1113	T7; 258	•	T65; 18	T74; 11	T9; 182	T8; 269	T9; 66	1st 835							2,904	11	3.67	0.35
7	(England) Canter	CUT; 0	CUT; 0	T55; 37	CUT; 0	3rd 500	T34; 58	T46; 39	T23; 89	T3; 570	1st 585	2nd 334	T7; 85	T2; 434					2,900	22	2.27	0.30
8	(Norway) Reitan	•	•	•	T30; 86	•	T13; 120	T24; 79	22nd 103	T28; 106	T2; 304	1st 585	T2; 304	T4; 148	T3; 181	T6; 114	T5; 166	T5; 146	2,762	31	1.97	0.25
9	(France) Saddier	•	•	•	T52; 41	CUT; 0	CUT; 0	2nd 889	T41; 53	T24; 124	T7; 85	T3; 197	5th 148	1st 585	T5; 194				2,643	26	2.07	0.20
10	(Sweden) Norén	•	T17; 132	•	•	•	CUT; 0	1st 1335	T17; 112	T16; 158	1st 835								2,573	7	2.26	0.15

Win
Top 10
Made cut
Missed cut
• Did not play

=== PGA Tour exemptions ===
The top 10 players on the Race to Dubai (not otherwise exempt) earned status to play on the 2026 PGA Tour. They were as follows:

- Marco Penge (2nd)
- ~~Laurie Canter (7th)~~ (Note: Laurie Canter (7th) became ineligible for the 2026 PGA Tour season, having joined LIV Golf in December 2025. Canter was therefore removed from the eligibility ranking; with Dan Brown (17th) taking his place.)
- Kristoffer Reitan (8th)
- Adrien Saddier (9th)
- Alex Norén (10th)
- John Parry (11th)
- Li Haotong (13th)
- Keita Nakajima (14th)
- Rasmus Neergaard-Petersen (15th)
- Jordan Smith (16th)
- Dan Brown (17th)

== Awards ==
Award	Winner	Ref.
Player of the Year (Seve Ballesteros Award)	(England) Marco Penge	
Sir Henry Cotton Rookie of the Year	(France) Martin Couvra	

== See also ==
- 2025 Challenge Tour
- 2025 European Senior Tour
