= Marco Penge =

English professional golfer (born 1998)

Personal information
- Nationality: England
- Born: 15 May 1998 (age 28) Crawley, England
- Height: 6 ft 1 in (1.85 m)
- Weight: 178 lb (81 kg; 12.7 st)
- Spouse: Sophie Lamb (m. 2023)
- Children: 2

Career
- Sport: Golf
- Turned professional: 2017
- Current tours: European Tour; PGA Tour
- Former tours: Challenge Tour; PGA EuroPro Tour
- Professional wins: 6
- Highest ranking: 29 (26 October 2025) (as of 15 November 2026)

Number of wins by tour
- European Tour: 3
- Challenge Tour: 2
- Other: 1

Best results in major championships
- Masters Tournament: T49: 2026
- PGA Championship: T28: 2025
- U.S. Open: DNP
- The Open Championship: T18: 2026

Achievements and awards
- Challenge Tour Rankings winner: 2023
- European Tour Player of the Year: 2025

Marco Penge (born 15 May 1998) is an English professional golfer who plays on the European Tour and the PGA Tour. In 2023, he won twice on the Challenge Tour to earn promotion to the European Tour. Penge won three events on the European Tour in 2025 and received that year's Seve Ballesteros Award as the European Tour's player of the season.

== Early life and amateur career ==
Penge was born in Crawley on 15 May 1998, to Marie and Angelo Penge, and grew up in the nearby market town of Horsham. His father Angelo, an aerial engineer, was born in Italy. Penge showed talent in football as a child. He was a prolific goalscorer at youth level for Chesworth Rovers in Horsham, and received trials with Reading F.C. and Southampton F.C.. Influenced by his Italian father, Penge stated in 2014 that he supported Italy rather than England in that year's World Cup.

Introduced to golf at age five, Penge had success at junior level and became a scratch handicap aged 13. In 2013, he won the McGregor Trophy, the Fairhaven Trophy, and lost a playoff for the Irish Boys Amateur Open. He represented England in the European Young Masters, the European Boys' Team Championship and the Boys Home Internationals, which he won twice. He also won the Jacques Léglise Trophy three times with the Great Britain & Ireland team.

Penge attended the Forest School in Horsham. He left school at the start of 2014 to pursue golf full-time. Penge won the 2015 Scottish Amateur Stroke Play Championship at Moray Golf Club, and lost a playoff at the 2016 Internationaux de France - Coupe Murat. In 2017, he finished runner-up at both the Spanish Amateur and the NSW Amateur.

== Professional career ==
Penge turned professional in 2017 and joined the PGA EuroPro Tour. In 2019 he won his first title, the Prem Group Irish Masters, and finished third on the Order of Merit to earn promotion to the 2020 Challenge Tour.

He was runner-up at the 2022 Kaskáda Golf Challenge before securing two titles in 2023 including the Rolex Challenge Tour Grand Final, to top the Order of Merit and earn promotion to the 2024 European Tour.

In his third European Tour start, he tied for 4th at the Alfred Dunhill Championship in South Africa. He finished 110th in the 2024 Race to Dubai, the last position for full DP World Tour status for 2025.

In December 2024, Penge received a three-month ban from competing in European Tour events for breaching the tour's "Integrity Programme" in relation to betting on golf tournaments. From 2022 to 2023, he had placed bets with an average stake of £24. He made a profit of around £250 on these wagers, and the bookmaker subsequently notified the tour of his activity. None of Penge's bets were placed on tournaments in which he played.

After his return from suspension, Penge finished third at the South African Open in March. The following month, he shot 17-under 271 to win the Hainan Classic by three shots over Sean Crocker and Kristoffer Reitan. This was Penge's first victory on the European Tour. The win came in his 47th start on the tour and moved him from 344th to 194th in the Official World Golf Ranking (OWGR).

He recorded his second victory at the Danish Golf Championship in August 2025, defeating Rasmus Højgaard by one stroke. With the win, Penge moved to a new high of 73rd in the OWGR. In October, Penge recorded his third tournament victory of the year. He defeated Dan Brown in a playoff at the Open de España. With the win, Penge secured entry to the 2026 Masters Tournament and the 2026 Open Championship.

== Personal life ==
In 2016, Penge won the Sunningdale Foursomes with his girlfriend and fellow golfer Sophie Lamb. They married in 2023 and had their first child in 2024.

Penge stated in 2025 that he was diagnosed with attention deficit hyperactivity disorder.

== Amateur wins ==
- 2013 Fairhaven Trophy, McGregor Trophy, Sussex Amateur Championship
- 2014 Fairhaven Trophy
- 2015 Faldo Series Wales, Peter McEvoy Trophy, Scottish Amateur Stroke Play Championship, Sir Henry Cooper Junior Masters

== Professional wins (6) ==
=== European Tour wins (3) ===
No.	Date	Tournament	Winning score	Margin of victory	Runner(s)-up
1	27 Apr 2025	Hainan Classic^{1}	−17 (68-71-65-67=271)	3 strokes	(United States) Sean Crocker, (Norway) Kristoffer Reitan
2	17 Aug 2025	Danish Golf Championship	−16 (64-68-69-67=268)	1 stroke	(Denmark) Rasmus Højgaard
3	12 Oct 2025	Open de España	−15 (66-67-64-72=269)	Playoff	(England) Dan Brown

^{1}Co-sanctioned by the China Tour

European Tour playoff record (1–0)

No.	Year	Tournament	Opponent	Result
1	2025	Open de España	(England) Dan Brown	Won with birdie on first extra hole

=== Challenge Tour wins (2) ===
Legend
Tour Championships (1)
Other Challenge Tour (1)

No.	Date	Tournament	Winning score	Margin of victory	Runner(s)-up
1	17 Sep 2023	Open de Portugal	−16 (65-68-69-70=272)	4 strokes	(Italy) Lorenzo Scalise, (United States) Julian Suri
2	5 Nov 2023	Rolex Challenge Tour Grand Final	−10 (69-68-72-69=278)	6 strokes	(France) Tom Vaillant

=== PGA EuroPro Tour wins (1) ===
No.	Date	Tournament	Winning score	Margin of victory	Runner-up
1	30 Aug 2019	Prem Group Irish Masters	−12 (66-67-71=204)	1 stroke	(England) Alasdair Plumb

== Results in major championships ==
Tournament	2022	2023	2024	2025	2026
Masters Tournament					T49
PGA Championship				T28	CUT
U.S. Open					
The Open Championship	CUT	CUT		CUT	T18

Did not play

CUT = missed the half-way cut
"T" = tied

== Team appearances ==
Amateur

- European Young Masters (representing England): 2013
- Boys Home Internationals (representing England): 2013, 2014 (winners), 2015, 2016 (winners)
- Jacques Léglise Trophy (representing Great Britain & Ireland): 2013 (winners), 2014 (winners), 2015 (winners), 2016
- European Boys' Team Championship (representing England): 2013, 2014, 2015
- European Amateur Team Championship (representing England): 2016

== See also ==
- 2023 Challenge Tour graduates
- 2025 Race to Dubai dual card winners
