= John Parry (golfer) =

English professional golfer (born 1986)

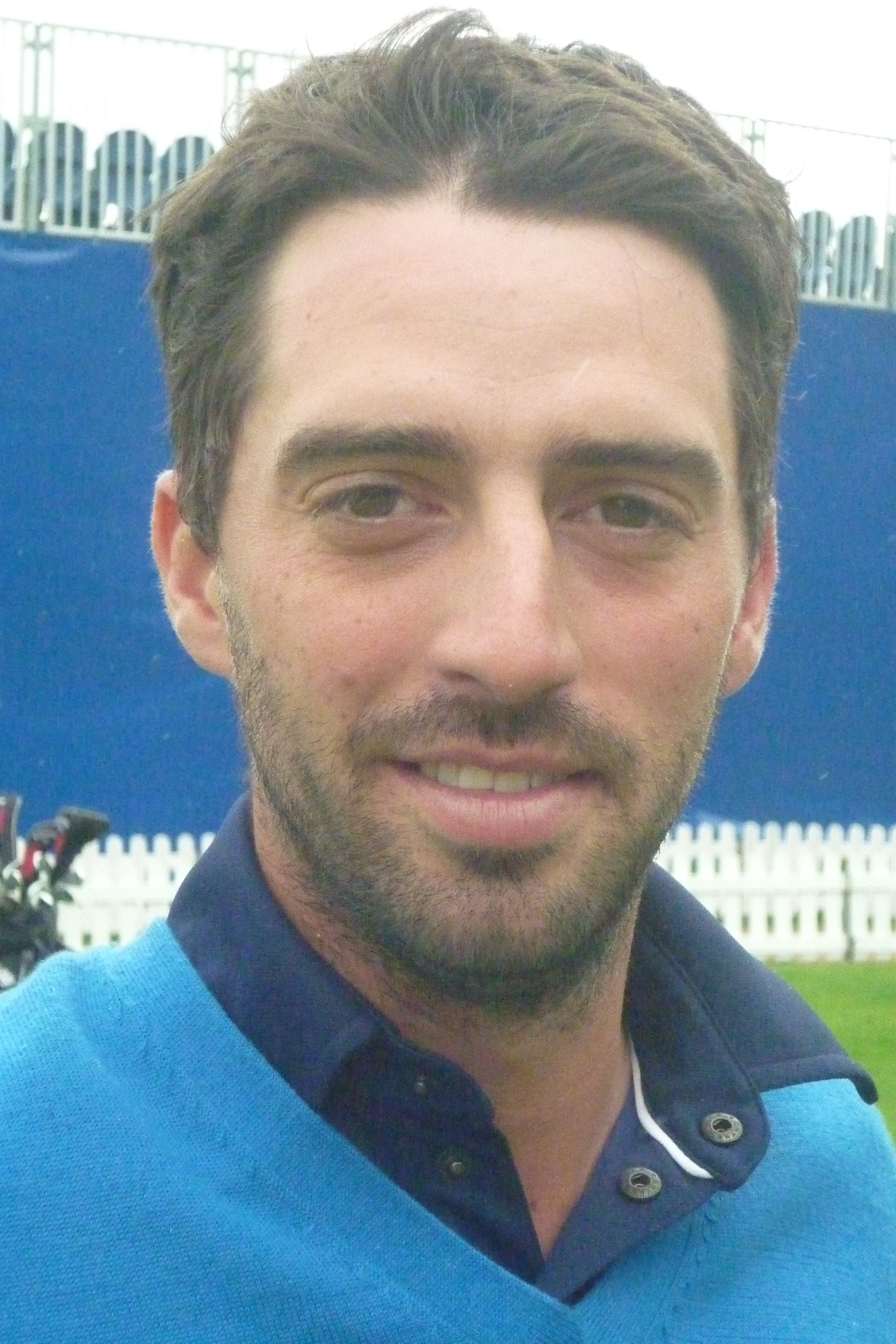
- Parry at the 2011 KLM Open

Personal information
- Full name: John Anthony Parry
- Nationality: England
- Born: 17 November 1986 (age 40) Harrogate, North Yorkshire, England
- Height: 1.70 m (5 ft 7 in)
- Weight: 64 kg (141 lb; 10.1 st)

Career
- Sport: Golf
- Turned professional: 2007
- Current tour: PGA Tour
- Former tours: European Tour; Challenge Tour; PGA EuroPro Tour
- Professional wins: 8
- Highest ranking: 80 (18 January 2026) (as of 15 November 2026)

Number of wins by tour
- European Tour: 2
- Sunshine Tour: 1
- Challenge Tour: 4
- Other: 2

Best results in major championships
- Masters Tournament: DNP
- PGA Championship: T70: 2026
- U.S. Open: T11: 2026
- The Open Championship: T16: 2025

John Anthony Parry (born 17 November 1986) is an English professional golfer who plays on the European Tour, where he has won twice, and the PGA Tour.

== Career ==
Parry was born in Harrogate. He won several high-profile amateur tournaments including the Danish and Spanish Amateur Championships, and represented Great Britain and Ireland in the Walker Cup before turning professional at the end of 2007.

Parry won the 2009 Allianz Golf Open Grand Toulouse on the Challenge Tour. He ended that season in 14th place on the Challenge Tour Rankings to earn his card on the top level European Tour for 2010. During his rookie season he won the Vivendi Cup to secure a one-year exemption on the tour. Parry was unable to follow up his win and in 2021, he was playing on the third-tier PGA EuroPro Tour. He won the Cumberwell Park Championship in June 2021 and finished fifth on the Order of Merit, securing status to play on the 2022 Challenge Tour.

In 2024, Parry won three times on the 2024 Challenge Tour season, securing automatic promotion to the European Tour. In December, he won the AfrAsia Bank Mauritius Open for his second European Tour win and first in over 14 years.

== Amateur wins ==
- 2004 Peter McEvoy Trophy
- 2005 Danish Amateur Championship
- 2007 Spanish International Amateur Championship, Welsh Amateur Open Stroke Play Championship

== Professional wins (8) ==
=== European Tour wins (2) ===
No.	Date	Tournament	Winning score	Margin of victory	Runner(s)-up
1	26 Sep 2010	Vivendi Cup	−17 (64-67-70-70=271)	2 strokes	(Sweden) Johan Edfors
2	22 Dec 2024 (2025 season)	AfrAsia Bank Mauritius Open^{1}	−14 (70-69-71-64=274)	2 strokes	(South Africa) Christo Lamprecht, (South Africa) Dylan Naidoo

^{1}Co-sanctioned by the Sunshine Tour

=== Challenge Tour wins (4) ===
No.	Date	Tournament	Winning score	Margin of victory	Runner(s)-up
1	11 Oct 2009	Allianz Golf Open Grand Toulouse	−21 (66-68-70-63=267)	2 strokes	(Portugal) José-Filipe Lima
2	17 Mar 2024	Delhi Challenge^{1}	−20 (66-69-68-65=268)	1 stroke	(United Arab Emirates) Joshua Grenville-Wood, (England) Chris Paisley, (England) Jack Senior
3	23 Jun 2024	Blot Open de Bretagne	−18 (64-67-63-68=262)	Playoff	(Sweden) Per Längfors
4	22 Sep 2024	Italian Challenge Open	−18 (66-67-65-68=266)	1 stroke	(South Africa) Justin Walters

^{1}Co-sanctioned by the Professional Golf Tour of India

Challenge Tour playoff record (1–0)

No.	Year	Tournament	Opponent	Result
1	2024	Blot Open de Bretagne	(Sweden) Per Längfors	Won with par on first extra hole

=== PGA EuroPro Tour wins (2) ===
No.	Date	Tournament	Winning score	Margin of victory	Runner(s)-up
1	25 Sep 2008	Ladbrokescasino.com Masters	−12 (67-65=132) (Note: Shortened to 36 holes due to weather.)	2 strokes	(England) Matt Ford
2	18 Jun 2021	Cumberwell Park Championship	−15 (64-67-67=198)	3 strokes	(England) Sam Broadhurst, (England) Joe Brooks, (England) Tom Sloman

== Results in major championships ==
Tournament	2013	2014	2015	2016	2017	2018
U.S. Open	T28		T72			
The Open Championship						
PGA Championship						

Tournament	2019	2020	2021	2022	2023	2024	2025	2026
PGA Championship							CUT	T70
U.S. Open								T11
The Open Championship		NT		T62			T16	T28

Note: Parry never played in the Masters Tournament

Did not play

CUT = missed the half-way cut
"T" indicates a tie for a place
NT = no tournament due to the COVID-19 pandemic

== Team appearances ==
Amateur

- European Boys' Team Championship (representing England): 2004 (winners)
- Jacques Léglise Trophy (representing Great Britain and Ireland): 2004 (winners)
- European Amateur Team Championship (representing England): 2007
- Walker Cup (representing Great Britain and Ireland): 2007

== See also ==
- 2009 Challenge Tour graduates
- 2012 European Tour Qualifying School graduates
- 2014 European Tour Qualifying School graduates
- 2016 European Tour Qualifying School graduates
- 2022 Challenge Tour graduates
- 2024 Challenge Tour graduates
- 2025 Race to Dubai dual card winners
- List of golfers to achieve a three-win promotion from the Challenge Tour
- List of golfers with most Challenge Tour wins
