= Martin Couvra =

French professional golfer (born 2003)

Personal information
- Nationality: France
- Born: 17 January 2003 (age 23) Toulon, France

Career
- Sport: Golf
- Turned professional: 2023
- Current tour: European Tour
- Former tour: Challenge Tour
- Professional wins: 3

Number of wins by tour
- European Tour: 1
- Challenge Tour: 1
- Other: 1

Best results in major championships
- Masters Tournament: DNP
- PGA Championship: DNP
- U.S. Open: DNP
- The Open Championship: CUT: 2025, 2026

Achievements and awards
- Sir Henry Cotton Rookie of the Year: 2025

Martin Couvra (born 17 January 2003) is a French professional golfer who plays on the European Tour. He won the 2025 Turkish Airlines Open, and previously had captured the 2023 Challenge de España to become the 7th amateur to win on the Challenge Tour.

== Early life and amateur career ==
Couvra was born on 17 January 2003 in Toulon, France. He grew up in La Seyne-sur-Mer. He trained at the École de Golf de Frégate in Saint-Cyr-sur-Mer. He won the 2022 French Amateur for the Coupe Murat, five strokes ahead of the runners-up.

In 2023, Couvra won three trophies in the space of two weeks in South Africa. He became the first ever player to win, in the same season, the South African Stroke Play Championship and the South African Amateur Championship, including the Proudfoot Trophy as medalist of the 36-hole stroke play qualifying after a playoff with Aldrich Potgieter.

== Professional career ==
Couvra turned professional and joined the Challenge Tour after he won the Challenge de España as an amateur in September 2023. He became the seventh amateur in history to win on the Challenge Tour after prevailing in a playoff with Andrea Pavan and Dermot McElroy.

Couvra finished 17th in the rankings and graduated to the European Tour for 2025. He recorded several top-5 finishes early on in his rookie season before winning the Turkish Airlines Open. In December, Couvra was named Sir Henry Cotton Rookie of the Year for the 2025 European Tour season.

== Amateur wins ==
- 2019 Tournoi Federal Jeunes U16 Boys
- 2020 Grand Prix du Medoc, Grand Prix Jean Louis Jurion
- 2022 Internationaux de France - Coupe Murat, Open d'Arcachon
- 2023 South African Stroke Play Championship, South African Amateur Championship

== Professional wins (3) ==
=== European Tour wins (1) ===
No.	Date	Tournament	Winning score	Margin of victory	Runners-up
1	11 May 2025	Turkish Airlines Open	−17 (65-66-72-64=267)	2 strokes	(Spain) Jorge Campillo, (China) Li Haotong

=== Challenge Tour wins (1) ===
No.	Date	Tournament	Winning score	Margin of victory	Runners-up
1	10 Sep 2023	Challenge de España (as an amateur)	−12 (67-70-66-65=268)	Playoff	(Northern Ireland) Dermot McElroy, (Italy) Andrea Pavan

Challenge Tour playoff record (1–0)

No.	Year	Tournament	Opponents	Result
1	2023	Challenge de España (as an amateur)	(Northern Ireland) Dermot McElroy, (Italy) Andrea Pavan	Won with par on second extra hole Pavan eliminated by par on first hole

=== French Tour wins (1) ===
No.	Date	Tournament	Winning score	Margin of victory	Runners-up
1	16 Oct 2022	Open d'Arcachon (as an amateur)	−14 (64-67-68=199)	1 stroke	(France) Antoine Auboin, (France) Grégory Havret

== Results in major championships ==
Tournament	2025	2026
Masters Tournament		
PGA Championship		
U.S. Open		
The Open Championship	CUT	CUT

Did not play

CUT = missed the half-way cut

== Team appearances ==
Amateur

- European Boys' Team Championship (representing France): 2021
- European Amateur Team Championship (representing France): 2022, 2023
- St Andrews Trophy (representing the Continent of Europe): 2022
- European Nations Cup – Copa Sotogrande (representing France): 2023

== See also ==
- 2024 Challenge Tour graduates
