= Casey Jarvis =

South African professional golfer (born 2003)

Personal information
- Nationality: South Africa
- Born: 28 July 2003 (age 23) Boksburg, South Africa

Career
- Sport: Golf
- Turned professional: 2022
- Current tours: Sunshine Tour; European Tour; PGA Tour
- Former tour: Challenge Tour
- Professional wins: 6
- Highest ranking: 57 (25 October 2026) (as of 15 November 2026)

Number of wins by tour
- European Tour: 2
- Sunshine Tour: 3
- Challenge Tour: 1
- Other: 1

Best results in major championships
- Masters Tournament: CUT: 2026
- PGA Championship: T65: 2026
- U.S. Open: CUT: 2024
- The Open Championship: T6: 2026

Achievements and awards
- Sunshine Tour Rookie of the Year: 2022–23
- Sunshine Tour Order of Merit winner: 2025–26

Casey Jarvis (born 28 July 2003) is a South African professional golfer who plays on the European Tour and Sunshine Tour, while currently holding Special Temporary Membership on the PGA Tour. In 2023, he shot a 59 at the Stella Artois Players Championship and became Sunshine Tour Rookie of the Year before winning the Euram Bank Open in Austria.

== Early life and amateur career ==
Jarvis was born and grew up in Boksburg, South Africa. He had a successful amateur career and was on the national squad. He won the 2019 Junior Golf World Cup in Japan with the South African team, joined by Samuel Simpson, Martin Vorster and Christo Lamprecht.

In 2020, at 16, he captured the South African double, winning both the South African Stroke Play Championship and the South African Amateur Championship.

He won the African Amateur Stroke Play Championship back to back in 2021 and 2022.

Jarvis also won on South Africa's development tour, the Big Easy Tour, a few weeks before he turned professional following the Western Amateur.

== Career ==
Jarvis turned professional in August 2022 and joined the Sunshine Tour, where he finished runner-up at the South African PGA Championship and The Tour Championship, and won the Rookie of the Year award.

At age 19, he become the second youngest person to shoot a 59, in the third round of the 2023 Stella Artois Players Championship.

Jarvis's results in Sunshine Tour events co-sanctioned by the Challenge Tour in early 2023 (including a second-place finish at the SDC Open) enabled him to play in further Challenge Tour events. He had runner-up finishes at the Copenhagen Challenge and D+D Real Czech Challenge before winning the Euram Bank Open in Austria in July to move to the top of the Race to Mallorca season ranking.

In February 2026, Jarvis won the Magical Kenya Open by three shots to clinch his first title on the European Tour. One week later, he won the Investec South African Open Championship to earn himself a spot in the Masters Tournament and The Open Championship. He went on to finish tied for 6th in The Open Championship, earning Special Temporary Membership on the PGA Tour for the rest of the 2026 season, which he accepted.

== Amateur wins ==
- 2017 English Boys Under-14 Open Amateur Stroke Play Championship
- 2018 South African Boys U17 Stroke Play, African Junior Open, Ekurhuleni Open
- 2019 Silver Salver
- 2020 Free State Open, Gauteng North Open, South African Stroke Play Championship, South African Amateur Championship
- 2021 African Amateur Stroke Play Championship
- 2022 Gauteng North Open, African Amateur Stroke Play Championship, Northern Cape Amateur Open, Africa Region 5 Amateur Tournament

== Professional wins (6) ==
=== European Tour wins (2) ===
No.	Date	Tournament	Winning score	Margin of victory	Runner(s)-up
1	22 Feb 2026	Magical Kenya Open	−25 (62-65-66-62=255)	3 strokes	(United States) Davis Bryant
2	1 Mar 2026	Investec South African Open Championship^{1}	−14 (67-68-64-67=266)	3 strokes	(South Africa) Hennie du Plessis, (France) Frédéric Lacroix, (Italy) Francesco Laporta

^{1}Co-sanctioned by the Sunshine Tour

=== Sunshine Tour wins (3) ===
No.	Date	Tournament	Winning score	Margin of victory	Runner(s)-up
1	9 Nov 2025	Hyundai Open	−23 (67-63-67-68=265)	1 stroke	(South Africa) Ryan van Velzen
2	23 Nov 2025	Vodacom Origins of Golf Final	−24 (68-62-69-65=264)	Playoff	(South Africa) Barend Botha
3	1 Mar 2026	Investec South African Open Championship^{1}	−14 (67-68-64-67=266)	3 strokes	(South Africa) Hennie du Plessis, (France) Frédéric Lacroix, (Italy) Francesco Laporta

^{1}Co-sanctioned by the European Tour

Sunshine Tour playoff record (1–0)

No.	Year	Tournament	Opponent	Result
1	2025	Vodacom Origins of Golf Final	(South Africa) Barend Botha	Won with eagle on third extra hole

=== Challenge Tour wins (1) ===
No.	Date	Tournament	Winning score	Margin of victory	Runner-up
1	16 Jul 2023	Euram Bank Open	−18 (65-63-65-69=262)	1 stroke	(Scotland) Euan Walker

=== Big Easy Tour wins (1) ===
No.	Date	Tournament	Winning score	Margin of victory	Runner-up
1	6 Jul 2022	Altron Big Easy Tour 6 (as an amateur)	−15 (69-66-66=201)	4 strokes	(Zambia) Dayne Moore

== Results in major championships ==
Tournament	2024	2025	2026
Masters Tournament			CUT
PGA Championship			T65
U.S. Open	CUT		
The Open Championship			T6

Top 10
Did not play

CUT = missed the half-way cut
"T" indicates a tie for a place

== Team appearances ==
Amateur

- Junior Golf World Cup (representing South Africa): 2019 (winners)

== See also ==
- Lowest rounds of golf
- 2023 Challenge Tour graduates
- 2026 Race to Dubai dual card winners
