= 2026 Race to Dubai dual card winners =

This is a list of the 10 European Tour (DP World Tour) players who earned PGA Tour card for the 2027 season via the 2026 Race to Dubai.

The top 10 players on the Race to Dubai (not otherwise exempt) earned status to play on the 2027 PGA Tour. They were as follows:

			2026 European Tour		2027 PGA Tour				
Rank	Cty	Player	R2D pos.	Points	Starts	Cuts made	Best finish	FedEx Cup rank	Prize money ($)
1	(Spain)	Eugenio Chacarra*	2	4,919					
2	(United States)	Patrick Reed	4	3,627					
3	(South Africa)	Casey Jarvis*	5	2,957					
4	(South Africa)	Jayden Schaper*	8	2,586					
5	(New Zealand)	Daniel Hillier*	10	2,491					
6	(Denmark)	Jacob Skov Olesen*	11	2,483					
7	(Finland)	Oliver Lindell*	12	2,463					
8	(England)	Andy Sullivan†	13	2,174					
9	(Austria)	Bernd Wiesberger†	14	2,102					
10	(England)	Joe Dean*	16	1,872					

* PGA Tour rookie in 2027

† First-time PGA Tour member in 2027, but ineligible for rookie status due to having played eight or more PGA Tour events as a professional in a previous season

== See also ==
- 2026 Korn Ferry Tour graduates
