= 2026–27 Sunshine Tour =

Golf tour season

2026–27 Sunshine Tour season
- Duration: 15 April 2026 – TBD
- Number of official events: TBD

The 2026–27 Sunshine Tour is the 56th season of the Sunshine Tour (formerly the Southern Africa Tour), the main professional golf tour in South Africa since it was formed in 1971.

== Schedule ==
The following table lists official events during the 2026–27 season.

Date	Tournament	Location	Purse (R)	Winner (Note: The number in brackets after each winner's name is the number of Sunshine Tour events they had won up to and including that tournament. This information is only shown for Sunshine Tour members.)	OWGR points	Other tours (Note: CHA − Challenge Tour; EUR − European Tour.)	Notes
18 Apr	Mediclinic Invitational	Free State	2,500,000	(South Africa) Samuel Simpson (2)	3.45		
10 May	FBC Zim Open	Zimbabwe	3,000,000	(South Africa) Altin van der Merwe (1)	3.43		
17 May	Kit Kat Cash & Carry Pro-Am	Gauteng	2,500,000	(South Africa) Gerhard Pepler (2)	3.13		
22 May	Sunbet Challenge (Sun Boardwalk)	Eastern Cape	2,500,000	(South Africa) Justin Walters (3)	2.84		
7 Jun	Waterfall City Tournament of Champions	Gauteng	2,500,000	(South Africa) Caitlyn Macnab (n/a)	n/a		Limited-field mixed event
14 Jun	Mopani Zambia Open	Zambia	US$150,000	(Zimbabwe) Stuart Krog (1)	2.70		
21 Jun	KCM Golf Challenge	Zambia	US$150,000	(South Africa) Samuel Simpson (3)	2.52		New tournament
7 Aug	Sunbet Challenge (Times Square)	Gauteng	2,500,000	(South Africa) Luke Brown (2)	3.47		
15 Aug	FNB Eswatini Challenge	Eswatini	2,500,000	(Australia) Austin Bautista (2)	2.51		
28 Aug	Sunbet Challenge (Wild Coast Sun)	Western Cape	2,500,000	(South Africa) Jean Hugo (22)	2.30		
11 Sep	Sunbet Challenge (Sun Sibaya)	KwaZulu-Natal	2,500,000	(South Africa) Samuel Simpson (4)	2.20		
27 Sep	Rwanda Open	Rwanda	2,500,000	(South Africa) Kyle de Beer (1)	1.85		New to Sunshine Tour
4 Oct	Limpopo Championship	Limpopo	2,500,000	(South Africa) Kyle Barker (3)	2.35		
11 Oct	Fortress Invitational	Gauteng	2,500,000	(Australia) Austin Bautista (3)	3.51		
17 Oct	Blu Label Unlimited Challenge	North West	3,200,000	(South Africa) Luke Brown (3)	3.15		
25 Oct	Stella Artois Players Championship	Gauteng	2,500,000	(South Africa) Deon Germishuys (4)	3.88		
8 Nov	Telkom PGA Championship	Gauteng	2,500,000	(South Africa) Louis Albertse (5)	4.64		
15 Nov	Hyundai Open	Gauteng	2,500,000	(South Africa) J. C. Ritchie (12)	4.34		
22 Nov	Zanaco Masters	Zambia	2,650,000				
29 Nov	MyGolfLife Match Play	Gauteng	2,500,000				New tournament
6 Dec	Nedbank Golf Challenge	North West	US$6,000,000			EUR	Limited-field event
13 Dec	AfrAsia Bank Mauritius Open	Mauritius	US$1,500,000			EUR	
24 Jan	SDC Open	Limpopo	US$375,000			CHA	
31 Jan	Jonsson Workwear Durban Open	KwaZulu-Natal	US$375,000			CHA	
7 Feb	Circa Cape Town Open	Western Cape	US$375,000			CHA	
14 Feb	NTT Data Pro-Am	Western Cape	7,000,000			CHA	Pro-Am
28 Feb	Alfred Dunhill Championship	Mpumalanga	€2,000,000			EUR	
7 Mar	Investec South African Open Championship	Western Cape	US$2,000,000			EUR	
14 Mar	Joburg Open	Gauteng	20,500,000			EUR	

== See also ==
- 2026–27 Big Easy Tour
