= Fredrik From =

Swedish professional golfer (born 1989)

Personal information
- Nationality: Sweden
- Born: 8 February 1989 (age 37) Lund, Sweden

Career
- Sport: Golf
- Turned professional: 2016
- Current tour: Sunshine Tour
- Former tour: MENA Tour
- Professional wins: 2

Achievements and awards
- PGA of Sweden Future Fund Award: 2019

Fredrik From (born 8 February 1989) is a Swedish professional golfer who plays on the Sunshine Tour. He was runner-up at the 2018 Vodacom Origins of Golf at Parys.

== Early life and amateur career ==
From competed on the Swedish Junior Tour, where he recorded one victory and three runner-up finishes between 2003 and 2006. He made the cut in his first Nordic Golf League start at the 2006 Gambro Open. In 2007, he was runner-up at the Österlen Junior Open, two strokes behind Alexander Björk.

From then took a seven-year break from competitive golf to focus on motocross racing, before returning to the game in 2015, when he was runner-up at the Scania District Championship at Elisefarm Golf Club.

From represents Barsebäck Golf & Country Club and was elected to the Båstad Municipality City Council in 2015 for the Moderate Party.

== Professional career ==
From turned professional in 2016 and played on the Gecko Tour in Spain, where he won one tournament and lost a playoff in two others.

He graduated from Q-School to play on the MENA Tour in 2016 and 2017. He shot a nine-under 63 in the final round of the 2017 Pattana Golf Championship in Thailand to finish -13 and win by three strokes. The win earned him 5 OWGR points and he was catapulted into the top-800 on the Official World Golf Ranking for the first time. He finished the season 5th in the Order of Merit.

In 2018, From joined the Sunshine Tour, where he was runner-up a stroke behind Garth Mulroy at the Vodacom Origins of Golf at Parys in his rookie season.

In 2025, he shared the clubhouse lead by the end of the first day at the South African Open, and ultimately tied for 11th, his best European Tour finish to date.

In his 7th season on the tour, From finished a career-best 27th in the 2024–25 Sunshine Tour Order of Merit, after a tied 4th-place finish alongside Kieran Vincent at the Zimbabwe Open and a 6th-place finish at the Zambia Open.

From tied for 3rd in the season opener of the 2025–26 Sunshine Tour, the Zimbabwe Open.

== Amateur wins ==
- 2006 Skandia Tour Riks #4 - Halland

== Professional wins (2) ==
=== MENA Golf Tour wins (1) ===
No.	Date	Tournament	Winning score	Margin of victory	Runner-up
1	19 May 2017	Pattana Golf Championship	−13 (68-63=131) (Note: Shortened to 36 holes due to weather.)	3 strokes	(Venezuela) Wolmer Murillo

=== Gecko Tour wins (1) ===
- 2016 Gecko Tour #4 – La Quinta
