= M. J. Viljoen =

South African professional golfer (born 1995)

Personal information
- Nationality: South Africa
- Born: 8 May 1995 (age 31) Johannesburg, South Africa

Career
- Sport: Golf
- Turned professional: 2014
- Current tours: Sunshine Tour; Challenge Tour
- Former tours: Asian Tour; Big Easy Tour
- Professional wins: 4

Number of wins by tour
- Sunshine Tour: 4
- Challenge Tour: 1

M. J. Viljoen (born 8 May 1995) is a South African professional golfer who plays on the Sunshine Tour, where he has won four tournaments.

== Professional career ==
Viljoen turned professional in 2014 and joined Big Easy Tour after earning his card at the Sunshine Tour Q-School. The following year he earned a full Sunshine Tour card at Q-School, and he registered his first win at the 2017 Sun Fish River Challenge. He was runner-up at the 2019 Vodacom Origins of Golf Final, behind George Coetzee.

In 2020, Viljoen recorded top-3 finishes at the Vodacom Championship Unlocked and the Investec Royal Swazi Open both behind winner Daniel van Tonder, and finished 10th in the season rankings. After three consecutive top-5 finishes in early 2021, he reached 256th place on the Official World Golf Ranking.

Viljoen won a second time at the SunBet Challenge in 2022, and his third win came in the 2024 Zambia Open at Nkana Golf Club in Kitwe, Zambia.

In 2023, he qualified for the Asian Tour, where he shot a 62 to take the second round lead at the Mandiri Indonesia Open.

In 2026, Viljoen won the SDC Open, and event co-sanctioned by the Challenge Tour.

== Professional wins (4) ==
=== Sunshine Tour wins (4) ===
| No. | Date | Tournament | Winning score | Margin of victory | Runner(s)-up |
|---|---|---|---|---|---|
| 1 | 8 Sep 2017 | Sun Fish River Challenge | −13 (69-69-65=203) | 1 stroke | (South Africa) Justin Harding, (South Africa) André Nel, (South Africa) Omar Sandys |
| 2 | 23 Sep 2022 | SunBet Challenge (Wild Coast Sun) | −19 (65-64-68=197) | 3 strokes | (Portugal) Stephen Ferreira, (South Africa) Pieter Moolman |
| 3 | 16 Jun 2024 | Mopani Zambia Open | −16 (66-70-71-65=272) | 6 strokes | (Zambia) Dayne Moore |
| 4 | 1 Feb 2026 | SDC Open^{1} | −16 (66-70-66-70=272) | Playoff | (South Africa) Deon Germishuys |

^{1}Co-sanctioned by the Challenge Tour

Sunshine Tour playoff record (1–0)

| No. | Year | Tournament | Opponent | Result |
|---|---|---|---|---|
| 1 | 2026 | SDC Open | (South Africa) Deon Germishuys | Won with birdie on first extra hole |

=== Challenge Tour wins (1) ===
| No. | Date | Tournament | Winning score | Margin of victory | Runner-up |
|---|---|---|---|---|---|
| 1 | 1 Feb 2026 | SDC Open^{1} | −16 (66-70-66-70=272) | Playoff | (South Africa) Deon Germishuys |

^{1}Co-sanctioned by the Sunshine Tour

Challenge Tour playoff record (1–0)

| No. | Year | Tournament | Opponent | Result |
|---|---|---|---|---|
| 1 | 2026 | SDC Open | (South Africa) Deon Germishuys | Won with birdie on first extra hole |
