= 2017 MENA Golf Tour =

Golf tour season

2017 MENA Golf Tour season
- Duration: 14 March 2017 – 26 October 2017
- Number of official events: 15
- Most wins: (South Africa) Mathiam Keyser (2)
- Order of Merit: (England) Jamie Elson

The 2017 MENA Golf Tour was the seventh season of the MENA Golf Tour.

== Schedule ==
The following table lists official events during the 2017 season.

Date	Tournament	Host country	Purse (US$)	Winner (Note: The number in brackets after each winner's name is the number of MENA Golf Tour events they had won up to and including that tournament.)	OWGR points	Other tours (Note: BET − Big Easy Tour.)
16 Mar	Palmeraie Country Club Casablanca Open	Morocco	40,000	(Spain) Leo Lilja (1)	3	
21 Mar	Royal Golf Mohammedia Open	Morocco	40,000	(Netherlands) Pierre Verlaar (a) (1)	3	
26 Apr	Ras Al Khaimah Classic	UAE	40,000	(North Macedonia) Peter Stojanovski (1)	3	
4 May	Mahasamutr Masters	Thailand	50,000	(Thailand) Jazz Janewattananond (1)	3	
10 May	Mountain Creek Open	Thailand	30,000	(France) Lionel Weber (1)	3	
19 May	Pattana Golf Championship	Thailand	50,000	(Sweden) Fredrik From (1)	5	
9 Jun	South to East Challenge	South Africa	30,000	(South Africa) Breyten Meyer (n/a)	3	BET
15 Jun	Joburg City Masters	South Africa	30,000	(South Africa) Jaco Prinsloo (n/a)	3	BET
22 Jun	'The Roar'	South Africa	30,000	(South Africa) Daniel Hammond (n/a)	3	BET
13 Sep	Dubai Creek Open	UAE	50,000	(South Africa) Mathiam Keyser (1)	3	
20 Sep	Golf Citizen Classic	UAE	30,000	(South Africa) Mathiam Keyser (2)	3	
27 Sep	Golf Citizen Abu Dhabi Open	UAE	50,000	(South Africa) Kyle Barker (1)	3	
7 Oct	Jordan's Ayla Golf Championship	Jordan	50,000	(England) Jamie Elson (1)	3	
18 Oct	Sahara Kuwait Championship	Kuwait	50,000	(Scotland) Robert MacIntyre (1)	3	
26 Oct	MENA Tour Championship	UAE	100,000	(Sweden) Henric Sturehed (1)	5	

== Order of Merit ==
The Order of Merit was based on prize money won during the season, calculated in U.S. dollars. The top three players on the Order of Merit earned status to play on the 2018–19 Sunshine Tour.

Position	Player	Prize money ($)
1	(England) Jamie Elson	36,677
2	(Sweden) Henric Sturehed	32,371
3	(England) Luke Joy	32,250
4	(England) Andrew Marshall	25,075
5	(Sweden) Fredrik From	22,346
