= 2025–26 Sunshine Tour =

Golf tour season

2025–26 Sunshine Tour season
- Duration: 8 May 2025 – 29 March 2026
- Number of official events: 31
- Most wins: (South Africa) Casey Jarvis (3)
- Order of Merit: (South Africa) Casey Jarvis
- Players' Player of the Year: (South Africa) Herman Loubser
- Rookie of the Year: (Mexico) Luis Carrera

The 2025–26 Sunshine Tour was the 55th season of the Sunshine Tour (formerly the Southern Africa Tour), the main professional golf tour in South Africa since it was formed in 1971.

== Schedule ==
The following table lists official events during the 2025–26 season.

Date	Tournament	Location	Purse (R)	Winner (Note: The number in brackets after each winner's name is the number of Sunshine Tour events they had won up to and including that tournament. This information is only shown for Sunshine Tour members.)	OWGR points	Other tours (Note: CHA − Challenge Tour; EUR − European Tour.)	Notes
11 May	FBC Zim Open	Zimbabwe	3,000,000	(Mexico) Luis Carrera (1)	3.65		
18 May	Kit Kat Cash & Carry Pro-Am	Gauteng	2,000,000	(Mexico) Luis Carrera (2)	4.50		Pro-Am
25 May	Waterfall City Tournament of Champions	Gauteng	2,500,000	(Zimbabwe) Kieran Vincent (2)	n/a		Limited-field mixed event
30 May	Gary & Vivienne Player Challenge	Gauteng	2,000,000	(South Africa) Malcolm Mitchell (2)	4.54		
8 Jun	Mopani Zambia Open	Zambia	US$150,000	(South Africa) Samuel Simpson (1)	2.93		
9 Aug	FNB Eswatini Challenge	Eswatini	2,000,000	(South Africa) Michael Hollick (4)	4.32		
17 Aug	Vodacom Origins of Golf at Parys	Free State	2,000,000	(South Africa) Herman Loubser (2)	4.13		
22 Aug	Sunbet Challenge (Time Square)	Gauteng	2,000,000	(South Africa) Jonathan Broomhead (4)	4.32		
5 Sep	Sunbet Challenge (Wild Coast)	Western Cape	2,000,000	(Australia) Austin Bautista (1)	3.56		
14 Sep	Vodacom Origins of Golf at Gowrie Farm	KwaZulu-Natal	2,000,000	(South Africa) Haydn Porteous (3)	3.76		
19 Sep	Sunbet Challenge (Sun Sibaya)	KwaZulu-Natal	2,000,000	(South Africa) Louis Albertse (4)	4.20		
28 Sep	Vodacom Origins of Golf at Devonvale	Western Cape	2,000,000	(South Africa) Jacques Kruyswijk (4)	3.45		
12 Oct	Limpopo Championship	Limpopo	2,500,000	(South Africa) Pieter Moolman (4)	3.53		
19 Oct	Fortress Invitational	Gauteng	2,500,000	(South Africa) Warwick Purchase (1)	4.58		
25 Oct	Blu Label Unlimited Challenge	North West	3,200,000	(South Africa) Hennie du Plessis (3)	4.61		
9 Nov	Hyundai Open	Gauteng	2,500,000	(South Africa) Casey Jarvis (1)	4.08		New tournament (Note: Tournament's debut delayed from 2024–25.)
15 Nov	Stella Artois Players Championship	Gauteng	2,500,000	(South Africa) J. C. Ritchie (11)	4.41		
23 Nov	Vodacom Origins of Golf Final	Western Cape	2,500,000	(South Africa) Casey Jarvis (2)	3.85		
30 Nov	Fitch & Leedes PGA Championship	Eastern Cape	3,000,000	(South Africa) Deon Germishuys (3)	5.18		
7 Dec	Nedbank Golf Challenge	North West	US$6,000,000	(Norway) Kristoffer Reitan (n/a)	21.01	EUR	Limited-field event
14 Dec	Alfred Dunhill Championship	Gauteng	€1,500,000	(South Africa) Jayden Schaper (1)	16.86	EUR	
21 Dec	AfrAsia Bank Mauritius Open	Mauritius	US$1,200,000	(South Africa) Jayden Schaper (2)	14.21	EUR	
25 Jan	Cell C Challenge	Eastern Cape	2,500,000	(Zimbabwe) Benjamin Follett-Smith (3)	4.23		New tournament
1 Feb	SDC Open	Limpopo	US$375,000	(South Africa) M. J. Viljoen (4)	9.05	CHA	
8 Feb	Circa Cape Town Open	Western Cape	US$375,000	(England) Will Enefer (n/a)	9.34	CHA	
15 Feb	NTT Data Pro-Am	Western Cape	7,000,000	(South Africa) M. J. Daffue (1)	7.14	CHA	Pro-Am
22 Feb	Jonsson Workwear Durban Open	KwaZulu-Natal	US$375,000	(South Africa) Oliver Bekker (9)	6.57	CHA	
1 Mar	Investec South African Open Championship	Western Cape	US$1,500,000	(South Africa) Casey Jarvis (3)	19.17	EUR	
8 Mar	Joburg Open	Gauteng	20,500,000	(England) Dan Bradbury (n/a)	16.65	EUR	
15 Mar	Serengeti Playoffs	Gauteng	2,500,000	(South Africa) Daniel van Tonder (13)	3.64		Playoff event
29 Mar	DNi Tour Championship	Western Cape	3,000,000	(South Africa) Martin Vorster (1)	2.69		Playoff event

== Order of Merit ==
The Order of Merit was titled as the The Courier Guy Order of Merit and was based on tournament results during the season, calculated using a points-based system. The leading player on the Order of Merit (not otherwise exempt) earned status to play on the 2027 European Tour (DP World Tour). The next two players on the Order of Merit earned status to play on the 2027 Challenge Tour (HotelPlanner Tour).

Position	Player	Points	Status earned
1	(South Africa) Casey Jarvis	4,863	Already exempt (Note: Jarvis was already exempt due to being a tournament winner on the 2026 European Tour (DP World Tour).)
2	(South Africa) Hennie du Plessis	2,379	Already exempt
3	(South Africa) Herman Loubser	1,960	Promoted to European Tour
4	(South Africa) Daniel van Tonder	1,956	Already exempt
5	(South Africa) M. J. Viljoen	1,767	Promoted to Challenge Tour
6	(South Africa) Pieter Moolman	1,761	Promoted to Challenge Tour

== Awards ==
Award	Winner	Ref.
Players' Player of the Year	(South Africa) Herman Loubser	
Rookie of the Year (Bobby Locke Trophy)	(Mexico) Luis Carrera	

== See also ==
- 2025–26 Big Easy Tour
