= Dylan Naidoo =

South African professional golfer (born 1998)

Personal information
- Nationality: South Africa
- Born: 21 February 1998 (age 28) Johannesburg, South Africa
- Height: 5 ft 9 in (1.75 m)

Career
- Sport: Golf
- College: University of Arkansas
- Turned professional: 2019
- Current tours: European Tour; Sunshine Tour
- Former tour: Challenge Tour
- Professional wins: 3

Number of wins by tour
- European Tour: 1
- Sunshine Tour: 2
- Other: 1

Best results in major championships
- The Open Championship: CUT: 2025

Dylan Naidoo (born 21 February 1998) is a South African professional golfer who plays on the European Tour and Sunshine Tour. He won the 2025 Investec South African Open Championship.

== Amateur career ==
Naidoo was a member of the GolfRSA National Squad as an amateur, and ended his junior campaign ranked 4th in South Africa.

In 2016, he won the All Africa Junior Golf Challenge in Tunisia and finished runner-up behind Joaquín Niemann at the Junior Golf World Cup in Japan. He was runner-up at the South African Amateur Championship and won the Big Easy Tour event at Observatory Golf Club, when he became the youngest winner on the tour to date.

Naidoo enrolled at the University of Arkansas in 2016 and played with the Arkansas Razorbacks men's golf team.

== Professional career ==
Naidoo turned professional in 2019 and joined the Sunshine Tour, where he recorded two top-10 finishes in his first three seasons. In 2022, he won his first Sunshine Tour title at the SunBet Challenge.

He was runner-up at the 2024 AfrAsia Bank Mauritius Open after being tied for the lead after three rounds. In March 2025, he claimed his maiden European Tour title at the 2025 Investec South African Open Championship at Durban Country Club, where he won a play-off against Laurie Canter after the final round was cancelled due to rain. The win also earned him a start at the 2025 Open Championship.

== Amateur wins ==
- 2016 All Africa Junior Golf Challenge (U18), Border Stroke Play Championship

== Professional wins (3) ==
=== European Tour wins (1) ===
No.	Date	Tournament	Winning score	Margin of victory	Runner-up
1	2 Mar 2025	Investec South African Open Championship^{1}	−14 (70-61-71=202) (Note: Shortened to 54 holes due to weather.)	Playoff	(England) Laurie Canter

^{1}Co-sanctioned by the Sunshine Tour

European Tour playoff record (1–0)

No.	Year	Tournament	Opponent	Result
1	2025	Investec South African Open Championship	(England) Laurie Canter	Won with birdie on first extra hole

=== Sunshine Tour wins (2) ===
No.	Date	Tournament	Winning score	Margin of victory	Runner(s)-up
1	21 Oct 2022	SunBet Challenge (Sun Sibaya)	−9 (66-74-67=207)	2 strokes	(South Africa) Jonathan Broomhead (a), (South Africa) Luke Brown, (South Africa) Jaco Prinsloo, (South Africa) Ian Snyman
2	2 Mar 2025	Investec South African Open Championship^{1}	−14 (70-61-71=202)	Playoff	(England) Laurie Canter

^{1}Co-sanctioned by the European Tour

Sunshine Tour playoff record (1–0)

No.	Year	Tournament	Opponent	Result
1	2025	Investec South African Open Championship	(England) Laurie Canter	Won with birdie on first extra hole

=== Big Easy Tour wins (1) ===
No.	Date	Tournament	Winning score	Margin of victory	Runner-up
1	25 May 2016	Observatory GC (as an amateur)	−11 (64-69=133)	2 strokes	(South Africa) Jason Viljoen

== Results in major championships ==
Tournament	2025
Masters Tournament	
PGA Championship	
U.S. Open	
The Open Championship	CUT

Did not play

CUT = missed the half-way cut

== Team appearances ==
Amateur

- Duke of York Young Champions Trophy (representing South Africa): 2015
- Junior Golf World Cup (representing South Africa): 2015, 2016
- Eisenhower Trophy (representing South Africa): 2016
