= Henric Sturehed =

Swedish professional golfer (born 1990)

Personal information
- Nationality: Sweden
- Born: 9 October 1990 (age 36) Linköping, Sweden

Career
- Sport: Golf
- Turned professional: 2011
- Current tour: Challenge Tour
- Former tours: European Tour; MENA Tour; Nordic Golf League
- Professional wins: 6

Henric Sturehed (born 9 October 1990) is a Swedish professional golfer who has played on the European Tour.

== Early life ==
Sturehed was born in Linköping, where his father was general manager of Landeryd Golf Club. He played ice hockey for Linköping HC until an injury ended his career, and he instead became a professional golfer at age 21.

== Professional career ==
Sturehed turned professional in 2011 and joined the Nordic Golf League, where he won his first title in 2014.

=== MENA Tour ===
Sturehed had his breakthrough competing on the 2017 MENA Golf Tour, where he won the season-ending MENA Tour Championship by a convincing nine strokes, setting a course record of 63 in the process. Sturehed became the fourth Swede after Per Barth, Christofer Blomstrand and Fredrik From to win a MENA Tour event. He finished the season 2nd on the MENA Tour Order of Merit which earned him cards on the Sunshine Tour and the Asian Development Tour, along with starts at the Omega Dubai Desert Classic and KLM Open on the European Tour.

He has continued to make the occasional MENA Tour start and was runner-up at the 2019 Journey to Jordan Tour Championship, and tied 3rd at the 2020 Royal Golf Club Bahrain Open.

=== European Tour ===
In November 2017, Sturehed became one of 33 players to earn European Tour cards through Q School, and he made his debut at the AfrAsia Bank Mauritius Open a few weeks later. In his rookie season, Sturehed finished tied 5th at Open de España in April, five strokes behind winner Jon Rahm. In July at Open de France, a 48 OWGR point Rolex Series event with the season's strongest field in continental Europe, he finished tied 12th and four strokes behind victorious compatriot Alex Norén. He ended the season 151st on the Order of Merit, and was relegated to the Challenge Tour.

=== Challenge Tour ===
In 2019, Sturehed recorded top-10 finishes at the Challenge de España, Irish Challenge and at the Open de Portugal, where he was co-leader ahead of the last round after a seven-under-par 65 third round and finished in a tie for 5th.

In the reduced 2020 season his best finish was a tie for 5th at Challenge de España.

In 2021, Sturehed was runner-up at the Dimension Data Pro-Am after losing a playoff to Wilco Nienaber. Since 2021, he has been plagued by a back injury, and had to sit out the 2025 season almost entirely to undergo several surgeries.

== Professional wins (6) ==
=== Nordic Golf League wins (1) ===
No.	Date	Tournament	Winning score	Margin of victory	Runner-up
1	24 Aug 2014	Landeryd Masters	−10 (71-69-66=206)	Playoff	(Norway) Elias Bertheussen

=== MENA Golf Tour wins (1) ===
No.	Date	Tournament	Winning score	Margin of victory	Runner-up
1	26 Oct 2017	MENA Tour Championship	−21 (68-63-67-69=267)	9 strokes	(England) Jake Shepherd

=== Evolve Pro Tour wins (1) ===
No.	Date	Tournament	Winning score	Margin of victory	Runners-up
1	14 Feb 2017	Lo Romero	−10 (68-68-70=206)	2 strokes	(South Korea) Byun Hyun-min, (Scotland) Ryan Campbell, (Spain) Sebastián García Rodríguez, (England) Liam Murray, (Spain) Jacobo Pastor

=== Swedish Future Series wins (3) ===
- 2015 Åtvidaberg Open
- 2016 Swerob Torshälla Open
- 2017 Skytteholm Open

== Playoff record ==
Sunshine Tour playoff record (0–1)

No.	Year	Tournament	Opponent	Result
1	2021	Dimension Data Pro-Am	(South Africa) Wilco Nienaber	Lost to par on third extra hole

Challenge Tour playoff record (0–1)

No.	Year	Tournament	Opponent	Result
1	2021	Dimension Data Pro-Am	(South Africa) Wilco Nienaber	Lost to par on third extra hole

== See also ==
- 2017 European Tour Qualifying School graduates
