= 2027 Challenge Tour =

Golf tour season

2027 Challenge Tour season
- Duration: 21 January 2027 – November 2027

The 2027 Challenge Tour, titled as the 2027 HotelPlanner Tour for sponsorship reasons, is the 39th season of the Challenge Tour, the official development tour to the European Tour.

== Schedule ==
The following table lists official events during the 2027 season.

Date	Tournament	Host country	Purse (€)	Winner (Note: The number in brackets after each winner's name is the number of Challenge Tour events they had won up to and including that tournament. This information is only shown for Challenge Tour members. It is rare for someone to accumulate many wins on the Challenge Tour as success at this level usually leads to promotion to the European Tour.)	OWGR points	Other tours (Note: AFR − Sunshine Tour.)	Notes
24 Jan	SDC Open	South Africa	US$375,000			AFR	
31 Jan	Jonsson Workwear Durban Open	South Africa	US$375,000			AFR	
7 Feb	Circa Cape Town Open	South Africa	US$375,000			AFR	
14 Feb	NTT Data Pro-Am	South Africa	7,000,000			AFR	Pro-Am
