= Jamie Elson =

English golfer (born 1981)

Personal information
- Full name: Philip James Elson
- Nationality: England
- Born: 23 May 1981 (age 45) Leamington Spa, England
- Height: 1.80 m (5 ft 11 in)

Career
- Sport: Golf
- College: Augusta State University
- Turned professional: 2003
- Former tours: European Tour; Challenge Tour; MENA Tour
- Professional wins: 3

Number of wins by tour
- Challenge Tour: 1
- Other: 2

Best results in major championships
- Masters Tournament: DNP
- PGA Championship: DNP
- U.S. Open: DNP
- The Open Championship: CUT: 2008

Achievements and awards
- MENA Golf Tour Order of Merit winner: 2017

Philip James Elson (born 23 May 1981) is an English professional golfer.

== Career ==
Elson was born in Leamington Spa, England. He attended Augusta State University in the U.S. and turned professional in 2003.

Elson played on the Challenge Tour in 2003, winning once at the Volvo Finnish Open. He played on the top-tier European Tour in 2004, but was unsuccessful and disappeared from both Tours for a number of years. In 2009, he made a comeback, and once again qualified for the European Tour via Qualifying School. His second season at the highest level was more successful, with a best finish of tied for second at the Saint-Omer Open, but he still only retained partial membership for the following season. However, he started 2011 strongly, recording two top-5 finishes before matching his best ever result with a tied for second at the Madeira Islands Open.

His father, Pip Elson, was also a successful professional golfer.

== Professional wins (3) ==
=== Challenge Tour wins (1) ===
No.	Date	Tournament	Winning score	Margin of victory	Runner-up
1	6 Jul 2003	Volvo Finnish Open	−24 (67-65-66-66=264)	2 strokes	(Austria) Martin Wiegele

=== MENA Golf Tour wins (1) ===
No.	Date	Tournament	Winning score	Margin of victory	Runner-up
1	7 Oct 2017	Jordan's Ayla Golf Championship	−7 (74-70-68=212)	Playoff	(England) Luke Joy

=== Other wins (1) ===
No.	Date	Tournament	Winning score	Margin of victory	Runners-up
1	30 Nov 2019	Saudi Open	−6 (210)	2 strokes	(Morocco) Ayoub Id-Omar, (Morocco) Ahmed Marjan

== Results in major championships ==
Tournament	2008
The Open Championship	CUT

Note: Elson only played in The Open Championship.
CUT = missed the half-way cut

== Team appearances ==
Amateur

- European Boys' Team Championship (representing England): 1998
- European Youths' Team Championship (representing England): 2000 (winners), 2002
- Palmer Cup (representing Great Britain and Ireland): 2000 (winners), 2001
- European Amateur Team Championship (representing England): 2001
- Walker Cup (representing Great Britain and Ireland): 2001 (winners)
- Eisenhower Trophy (representing England): 2002
- St Andrews Trophy (representing Great Britain & Ireland): 2002 (winners)

== See also ==
- 2009 European Tour Qualifying School graduates
- 2011 European Tour Qualifying School graduates
