= 2020–21 Big Easy Tour =

Golf tour season

2020–21 Big Easy Tour season
- Duration: 19 October 2020 – 10 December 2021
- Number of official events: 21
- Most wins: (South Africa) Ian Snyman (5)
- Order of Merit: (South Africa) Kyle McClatchie

The 2020–21 Big Easy Tour was the 10th season of the Big Easy Tour, the official development tour to the Sunshine Tour.

== Schedule ==
The following table lists official events during the 2020–21 season.

Date	Tournament	Location	Purse (R)	Winner (Note: The number in brackets after each winner's name is the number of Big Easy Tour events they had won up to and including that tournament. It is rare for someone to accumulate many wins on the Big Easy Tour as success at this level usually leads to promotion to the Sunshine Tour.)	OWGR points
21 Oct 2020	Big Easy Road to #1	Gauteng	60,000	(South Africa) Ryan van Velzen (a) (1)	3
28 Oct 2020	Big Easy Road to #2	Gauteng	60,000	(South Africa) Kyle McClatchie (2)	3
26 Nov 2020	Big Easy Road to #3	Gauteng	60,000	(South Africa) Herman Loubser (1)	3
4 Dec 2020	Big Easy Road to #4	Gauteng	60,000	(South Africa) Gerhard Pepler (1)	3
27 Jan 2021	Big Easy Road to #5	Gauteng	60,000	(South Africa) Luke Brown (2)	3
24 Feb 2021	Big Easy Road to #6	Gauteng	60,000	(South Africa) Therion Nel (1)	3
3 Mar 2021	Big Easy Road to #7	Gauteng	60,000	(South Africa) Ian Snyman (1)	3
25 Mar 2021	Big Easy Road to #8	Gauteng	60,000	(South Africa) Ryan van Velzen (a) (2)	3
31 Mar 2021	Big Easy Road to #9	Gauteng	60,000	(South Africa) Keelan van Wyk (1)	3
21 Apr 2021	Big Easy Road to #10	Gauteng	60,000	(South Africa) Ian Snyman (2)	3
26 May 2021	Big Easy Road to #11	North West	60,000	(South Africa) Slade Pickering (a) (1)	3
2 Jun 2021	Big Easy Road to #12	Gauteng	60,000	(South Africa) Christiaan Burke (a) (1)	3
25 Aug 2021	Big Easy Road to #13	Gauteng	70,000	(South Africa) Slade Pickering (a) (2)	3
1 Sep 2021	Big Easy Road to #14	Gauteng	70,000	(South Africa) Ian Snyman (3)	3
22 Sep 2021	Big Easy Road to #15	Gauteng	70,000	(South Africa) Ian Snyman (4)	3
29 Sep 2021	Big Easy Road to #16	Gauteng	70,000	(South Africa) Noel Anderson (a) (1)	3
27 Oct 2021	Big Easy Road to #17	Gauteng	70,000	(South Africa) Kyle McClatchie (3)	3
4 Nov 2021	Big Easy Road to #18	North West	70,000	(South Africa) Dean O'Riley (3)	3
10 Nov 2021	Big Easy Play Off 1	Gauteng	70,000	(South Africa) Ian Snyman (5)	3
17 Nov 2021	Big Easy Play Off 2	Gauteng	70,000	(South Africa) Erhard Lambrechts (1)	3
10 Dec 2021	Big Easy Tour Champs	Gauteng	70,000	(South Africa) Kyle McClatchie (4)	3

== Order of Merit ==
The Order of Merit was based on prize money won during the season, calculated in South African rand. The top six players on the Order of Merit earned status to play on the 2022–23 Sunshine Tour.

Position	Player	Prize money (R)
1	(South Africa) Kyle McClatchie	60,547
2	(South Africa) Ian Snyman	46,562
3	(South Africa) Erhard Lambrechts	44,799
4	(South Africa) Therion Nel	41,597
5	(South Africa) Vaughn van Deventer	36,396
6	(South Africa) Keelan van Wyk	33,885
