= 2011 Big Easy Tour =

Golf tour season

2011 Big Easy Tour season
- Duration: 24 March 2011 – 30 September 2011
- Number of official events: 11
- Order of Merit: (South Africa) Louis Calitz

The 2011 Big Easy Tour was the inaugural season of the Big Easy Tour, the official development tour to the Sunshine Tour.

== Schedule ==
The following table lists official events during the 2011 season.

Date	Tournament	Location	Purse (R)	Winner (Note: The number in brackets after each winner's name is the number of Big Easy Tour events they had won up to and including that tournament. It is rare for someone to accumulate many wins on the Big Easy Tour as success at this level usually leads to promotion to the Sunshine Tour.)
25 Mar	Crown Mines	Gauteng	100,000	(South Africa) Bryce Easton (1)
14 Apr	Irene Country Club	Gauteng	100,000	(South Africa) Tyrone Ryan (1)
13 May	Observatory Golf Club	Gauteng	100,000	(South Africa) Derick Petersen (1)
15 Jun	Glendower Golf Club	Gauteng	100,000	(South Africa) Albert Pistorius (1)
24 Jun	Kempton Park Golf Club	Gauteng	100,000	(South Africa) Dean O'Riley (1)
6 Jul	ERPM Golf Club	Gauteng	100,000	(South Africa) Thabang Simon (1)
22 Jul	Maccauvlei Golf Club	Gauteng	100,000	(South Africa) Divan Gerber (1)
3 Aug	Houghton Golf Club	Gauteng	100,000	(South Africa) Callie Swart (1)
19 Aug	Benoni Country Club	Gauteng	100,000	(South Africa) Lyle Rowe (1)
9 Sep	Modderfontein Golf Club	Gauteng	100,000	(South Africa) Morne Buys (1)
30 Sep	Big Easy Tour Championship	Gauteng	250,000	(South Africa) Louis Calitz (1)

== Order of Merit ==
The Order of Merit was based on prize money won during the season, calculated in South African rand. The top five players on the Order of Merit earned status to play on the 2012 Sunshine Tour.

Position	Player	Prize money (R)
1	(South Africa) Louis Calitz	61,022
2	(South Africa) Dean Burmester	55,555
3	(South Africa) Thabang Simon	50,915
4	(South Africa) Ockie Strydom	42,291
5	(South Africa) Lyle Rowe	38,195
