= The Tour Championship (Sunshine Tour) =

DNi Tour Championship
Tournament information
- Location: Stellenbosch, South Africa
- Established: 2018
- Course: De Zalze Golf Club
- Par: 72
- Length: 6,920 yards (6,330 m)
- Tour: Sunshine Tour
- Format: Stroke play
- Prize fund: R 3,000,000
- Month played: March

Tournament record score
- Aggregate: 267 Tristen Strydom (2022); 267 Martin Vorster (2026)
- To par: −21 as above

Current champion
- (South Africa) Martin Vorster

Location map
- Location in South Africa Location in Western Cape

The Tour Championship is a season-ending golf tournament on the Sunshine Tour played at Serengeti Estates in Kempton Park, Gauteng, South Africa. It was first played in March 2018 with prize money of R 1,500,000.

Darren Fichardt won the inaugural event by one stroke from Oliver Bekker. Jean-Paul Strydom won the following year finishing a stroke ahead of the field.

== Winners ==
| Year | Winner | Score | To par | Margin of victory | Runner(s)-up |
DNi Tour Championship
| 2026 | (South Africa) Martin Vorster | 267 | −21 | 2 strokes | (South Africa) Jaco Prinsloo (South Africa) Altin van der Merwe |
| 2025 | (South Africa) Michael Hollick | 269 | −19 | 1 stroke | (South Africa) George Coetzee (South Africa) Jacques Kruyswijk |
The Tour Championship
| 2024 | (South Africa) Jonathan Broomhead | 272 | −16 | 2 strokes | (South Africa) Louis Albertse (South Africa) Rupert Kaminski |
| 2023 | (South Africa) Jaco Ahlers | 271 | −17 | 4 strokes | (South Africa) Casey Jarvis |
| 2022 | (South Africa) Tristen Strydom | 267 | −21 | 6 strokes | (South Africa) Pieter Moolman |
| 2021 | No tournament due to the COVID-19 pandemic | | | | |
| 2020 | (South Africa) Garrick Higgo | 269 | −19 | 1 stroke | (South Africa) Haydn Porteous |
| 2019 | (South Africa) Jean-Paul Strydom | 274 | −14 | 1 stroke | (South Africa) Jean Hugo (South Africa) Thriston Lawrence (South Africa) Jake Roos (South Africa) Ockie Strydom |
| 2018 | (South Africa) Darren Fichardt | 271 | −17 | 1 stroke | (South Africa) Oliver Bekker |
