= 2014 Big Easy Tour =

Golf tour season

2014 Big Easy Tour season
- Duration: 22 April 2014 – 17 September 2014
- Number of official events: 7
- Most wins: (South Africa) Maritz Wessels (2)
- Order of Merit: (South Africa) Maritz Wessels

The 2014 Big Easy Tour was the fourth season of the Big Easy Tour, the official development tour to the Sunshine Tour.

== Schedule ==
The following table lists official events during the 2014 season.

Date	Tournament	Location	Purse (R)	Winner (Note: The number in brackets after each winner's name is the number of Big Easy Tour events they had won up to and including that tournament. It is rare for someone to accumulate many wins on the Big Easy Tour as success at this level usually leads to promotion to the Sunshine Tour.)
23 Apr	Centurion CC	Gauteng	100,000	(South Africa) Drikus van der Walt (1)
30 Apr	Houghton GC	Gauteng	100,000	(South Africa) Andrew Light (1)
7 May	Kempton Park GC	Gauteng	100,000	(South Africa) Callie Swart (2)
21 May	Wingate CC	Gauteng	100,000	(South Africa) Rhys West (1)
5 Aug	Irene CC	Gauteng	100,000	(South Africa) Maritz Wessels (1)
20 Aug	Glendower GC	Gauteng	100,000	(South Africa) Tyrone Ryan (2)
17 Sep	Big Easy Tour Championship	Gauteng	200,000	(South Africa) Maritz Wessels (2)

== Order of Merit ==
The Order of Merit was based on prize money won during the season, calculated in South African rand. The top five players on the Order of Merit earned status to play on the 2015 Sunshine Tour.

Position	Player	Prize money (R)
1	(South Africa) Maritz Wessels	51,593
2	(South Africa) Roberto Lupini	40,914
3	(South Africa) Juan Langeveld	31,920
4	(South Africa) Callie Swart	30,421
5	(South Africa) Henk Alberts	29,405
