= Jonathan Broomhead =

South African professional golfer (born 1995)

Personal information
- Nationality: South Africa
- Born: 24 November 2000 (age 25) Durban, South Africa

Career
- Sport: Golf
- Turned professional: 2023
- Current tours: European Tour; Sunshine Tour
- Professional wins: 4

Number of wins by tour
- Sunshine Tour: 4

Jonathan Broomhead (born 24 November 2000) is a South African professional golfer and European Tour player. He has won four tournaments on the Sunshine Tour.

== Early life and amateur career ==
Broomhead was born in Durban and practices at Durban Country Club. In 2022, he won the South African Stroke Play Championship two strokes ahead of Christiaan Maas, and was stroke play medalist at the The Amateur Championship.

As an amateur, he was runner-up at the 2022 SunBet Challenge (Sun Sibaya), two strokes behind Dylan Naidoo.

== Professional career ==
Broomhead turned professional in 2023 and joined the Sunshine Tour. He claimed four titles in the space of 16 months, beginning with the 2024 The Tour Championship.

Broomhead finished 4th on the 2024–25 Order of Merit to earn status to play on the 2026 European Tour.

== Amateur wins ==
- 2021 KwaZulu-Natal Amateur Championship
- 2022 South African Stroke Play Championship, Southern Cape Open, All Africa Team Championship
- 2023 Free State Open, Gauteng North Open

== Professional wins (4) ==
=== Sunshine Tour wins (4) ===
Legend
Tour Championships (1)
Other Sunshine Tour (3)

No.	Date	Tournament	Winning score	Margin of victory	Runner(s)-up
1	14 Apr 2024	The Tour Championship	−16 (70-66-67-69=272)	2 strokes	(South Africa) Louis Albertse, (South Africa) Rupert Kaminski
2	13 Oct 2024	Vodacom Origins of Golf at Wild Coast Sun	−11 (70-66-63=199)	Playoff	(South Africa) Luke Brown
3	2 Nov 2024	Blue Label Challenge	45 pts (19-12-7-7=49)	4 points	(South Africa) Ricky Hendler
4	22 Aug 2025	Sunbet Challenge (Time Square)	−13 (69-66-68=203)	Playoff	(South Africa) Jean-Paul Strydom

Sunshine Tour playoff record (2–1)

No.	Year	Tournament	Opponent	Result
1	2024	Vodacom Origins of Golf at Wild Coast Sun	(South Africa) Luke Brown	Won with birdie on third extra hole
2	2025	Gary & Vivienne Player Challenge	(South Africa) Malcolm Mitchell	Lost to birdie on first extra hole
3	2025	Sunbet Challenge (Time Square)	(South Africa) Jean-Paul Strydom	Won with par on first extra hole
