= Junior Open Championship =

The Junior Open Championship
Tournament information
- Location: United Kingdom
- Established: 1994
- Course: 2022 – Monifieth Golf Club
- Format: Stroke play
- Month played: July

Current champion
- (Scotland) Connor Graham

The Junior Open Championship is a biennial event, to which all golfing nations affiliated to The R&A are invited to enter their best under-16 boy and girl golfers. In 2016, 80 countries were represented in the starting field of 143 competitors contrasting with 2002 when a total of 86 boys and girls from 58 countries took part. Boys and girls compete in the same event but play off different tees.

The Junior Open is closely linked to The Open Championship and is always played on a nearby course in the same week in July. All competitors are invited to attend The Open after the conclusion of their own event.

The competition came under the R&A's administrative umbrella in 2000, having been founded in 1994.

== Notable players ==
Future 2018 Masters Tournament winner Patrick Reed won this championship in 2006, Jordan Spieth was runner-up in 2008.

== Results ==
Year	Venue	Champion	Country	Score	Ref
2024	Kilmarnock (Barassie) Golf Club	Seonghyeon An	South Korea	210	
2022	Monifieth	Connor Graham	Scotland	203	
2020	Littlestone-on-Sea	Cancelled			
2018	Eden Course, St Andrews	Martin Vorster	South Africa	205	
2016	Kilmarnock (Barassie)	Pedro Lencart Silva	Portugal	214	
2014	West Lancashire	Kevin LeBlanc	Ireland	221	
2012	Fairhaven	Asuka Kashiwabara	Japan	206	
2010	Lundin	Kenta Konishi	Japan	211	
2008	Hesketh	Moriya Jutanugarn	Thailand	225	
2006	Heswall	Patrick Reed	United States	217	
2004	Kilmarnock (Barassie)	Jordan Cox	United States	215	
2002	Royal Musselburgh	Cian McNamara	Ireland	207	
2000	Crail (Balcomie & Craighead)	Steven Jeppesen	Sweden	223	
1998	Formby Golf Club	David Inglis	Scotland	148	

== Future venues ==
- tba
