= Kilmarnock (Barassie) Golf Club =

Golf club in Ayrshire, Scotland

Coordinates: 55.552°N 4.645°W

Kilmarnock (Barassie) Golf Club is a golf club and course in Barassie (on the outskirts of Troon, Ayrshire) on the west coast of Scotland. Formed as Ossington Golf Club in 1887, the first course was at Holmes Farm in Kilmarnock. The Club quickly became Kilmarnock Golf Club. The club moved to Barassie in the 1890s.

The town of Kilmarnock is known for its sporting heritage with some of the oldest football, rugby, cricket and bowling clubs in Scotland and the UK. (See Kilmarnock FC, Kilmarnock RFC)

The course itself is an Open Championship Final Qualifying venue, and has undergone considerable changes over the past few years. It has 27 holes, and also has much improved facilities in the clubhouse and professional's shop run by James Caldwell.

The additional nine holes are part of the championship course and have added a different dimension to Barassie with a par of 72 and a Standard Scratch of 74. The course measures at just under 7,000 yards and the new holes provide some challenges, perhaps no more so than the par-3 fourth hole or the quirky double dog-leg par-5 eighth.

The course was host for The Amateur Championship in June 2001 along with Prestwick Golf Club and played host to the European Youths Championships the previous year. The Open Championship at Royal Troon in 2004 and 2016 saw Barassie play host to the Junior Open Championship.

Well-known members include Jim Milligan and Gordon Sherry who played in successful Walker Cup teams and Alan Reid who won the Scottish Amateur Stroke Play Championship. Milligan was Scottish Amateur champion in 1988 whilst Sherry was The Amateur champion in 1995. Alasdair Watt was Scottish Amateur runner-up in 1987, losing to Colin Montgomerie of Royal Troon Golf Club. John Montgomerie won the Scottish Amateur in the 1950s. The club produced members including David Wilson, Jack McDonald, Euan Walker and Callum Gorrie who have all represented Scotland. As well as being Scottish Club Champions, Barassie have also been European Club Champions in the 1990s.
