= Martin Vorster =

South African professional golfer (born 2002)

Personal information
- Nationality: South Africa
- Born: 22 January 2002 (age 24) Mossel Bay, South Africa

Career
- Sport: Golf
- Turned professional: 2021
- Current tours: Sunshine Tour; Challenge Tour
- Professional wins: 1

Number of wins by tour
- Sunshine Tour: 1

Martin Vorster (born 22 January 2002) is a South African professional golfer who plays on the Sunshine Tour.

== Amateur career ==
Vorster had a stellar amateur career in the GolfRSA ranks. He was a member of the Academy of Louis Oosthuizen at Fancourt Country Club, and was supported by the Louis 57 Foundation for 10 years.

Vorster won the R&A's Junior Open Championship at St Andrews Links in 2018, before winning the 2019 Junior Golf World Cup with South Africa and finishing runner-up individually.

In 2019, he was selected for the Junior Presidents Cup, finished top-10 at the Junior Players Championship, and was runner-up at the 2019 Big Easy Challenge #3, a stroke behind Garrick Higgo.

In 2021, he reached the semi-finals of the South African Amateur Championship and won the South African Stroke Play Championship. He reached a high of 24th in the World Amateur Golf Ranking.

== Professional career ==
Vorster turned professional in November 2021 and joined the Sunshine Tour.

He was runner-up at the 2024 Vodacom Origins of Golf at Sishen and 2025 MyGolfLife Open, to finish 12th in the 2024/25 Order of Merit, before securing his maiden title at the 2026 DNi Tour Championship.

In 2023, he also joined the Challenge Tour, where he was runner-up at the 2026 Swiss Challenge.

Vorster made his LIV Golf debut at the 2026 LIV Golf UK, where he replaced his mentor Louis Oosthuizen, who was injured.

== Amateur wins ==
- 2015 Louis Oosthuizen Junior Club Championship
- 2017 KwaZulu-Natal Open Strokeplay
- 2018 Junior Open Championship
- 2019 Western Province Amateur Matchplay, East of Ireland Amateur Open Championship, Limpopo Open
- 2020 African Amateur Stroke Play Championship
- 2021 South African Stroke Play Championship, Western Province Amateur

== Professional wins (1) ==
=== Sunshine Tour wins (1) ===
Legend
Tour Championships (1)
Other Sunshine Tour (0)

No.	Date	Tournament	Winning score	Margin of victory	Runners-up
1	29 Mar 2026	DNi Tour Championship	−21 (63-67-71-66=267)	2 strokes	(South Africa) Jaco Prinsloo, (South Africa) Altin van der Merwe

== Team appearances ==
Amateur

- Junior Golf World Cup (representing South Africa): 2018, 2019 (winners)
- Junior Presidents Cup (representing the International team): 2019
- Spirit International Amateur (representing South Africa): 2019
