= 2018 Big Easy Tour =

Golf tour season

2018 Big Easy Tour season
- Duration: 16 April 2018 – 14 December 2019
- Number of official events: 16
- Most wins: (South Africa) Matt Bright (2) (South Africa) Cameron Moralee (2) (South Africa) Dylan Mostert (2)
- Order of Merit: (South Africa) Dylan Kok

The 2018 Big Easy Tour was the eighth season of the Big Easy Tour, the official development tour to the Sunshine Tour.

== OWGR inclusion ==
In August 2017, the Official World Golf Ranking announced that all Big Easy Tour events would be awarded points, beginning with the Big Easy Challenge 1.

== Schedule ==
The following table lists official events during the 2018 season.

Date	Tournament	Location	Purse (R)	Winner (Note: The number in brackets after each winner's name is the number of Big Easy Tour events they had won up to and including that tournament. It is rare for someone to accumulate many wins on the Big Easy Tour as success at this level usually leads to promotion to the Sunshine Tour.)	OWGR points
18 Apr	Big Easy Challenge 1	Gauteng	75,000	(South Africa) Dylan Mostert (1)	3
16 May	Big Easy Challenge 2	North West	75,000	(South Africa) Duane Keun (1)	3
23 May	Big Easy Challenge 3	Gauteng	75,000	(South Africa) Dylan Mostert (2)	3
6 Jun	Big Easy Challenge 4	Gauteng	75,000	(South Africa) Otto van Buynder (a) (1)	3
27 Jun	Big Easy Challenge 5	Gauteng	75,000	(South Africa) Matt Bright (1)	3
4 Jul	Big Easy Challenge 6	Gauteng	75,000	(South Africa) Matt Bright (2)	3
8 Aug	Big Easy Challenge 7	Gauteng	75,000	(South Africa) Paul Boshoff (1)	3
22 Aug	Big Easy Challenge 8	Gauteng	75,000	(South Africa) Cameron Moralee (1)	3
5 Sep	Big Easy Challenge 9	Gauteng	75,000	(Zimbabwe) Benjamin Follett-Smith (1)	3
19 Sep	Big Easy Challenge 10	Gauteng	75,000	(Botswana) Stuart Smith (1)	3
10 Oct	Big Easy Challenge 11	Gauteng	75,000	(South Africa) Albert Venter (1)	3
24 Oct	Big Easy Challenge 12	Gauteng	75,000	(South Africa) Juran Dreyer (1)	3
31 Oct	Big Easy Challenge 13	Gauteng	75,000	(South Africa) Cameron Moralee (2)	3
14 Nov	Big Easy Challenge 14	Gauteng	75,000	(South Africa) Eric Nel (1)	3
28 Nov	Big Easy Challenge 15	Gauteng	75,000	(South Africa) Thriston Lawrence (1)	3
14 Dec	Big Easy Tour Championship	Gauteng	200,000	(South Africa) Luke Brown (1)	3

== Order of Merit ==
The Order of Merit was based on prize money won during the season, calculated in South African rand. The top 10 players on the Order of Merit earned status to play on the 2019–20 Sunshine Tour.

Position	Player	Prize money (R)
1	(South Africa) Dylan Kok	58,789
2	(South Africa) Luke Brown	51,114
3	(South Africa) Matt Bright	50,274
4	(South Africa) Juran Dreyer	47,857
5	(South Africa) Dylan Mostert	37,073
6	(South Africa) Ruan Korb	35,805
7	(South Korea) Kim Dong-kwan	34,792
8	(South Africa) Cameron Moralee	33,967
9	(South Africa) Paul Boshoff	32,921
10	(South Africa) Hendrikus Stoop	32,443
