= Michael Hollick (golfer) =

South African professional golfer (born 1987)

Personal information
- Nationality: South Africa
- Born: 15 May 1987 (age 39) Durban, South Africa
- Height: 6 ft 1 in (185 cm)

Career
- Sport: Golf
- Turned professional: 2012
- Current tour: European Tour
- Former tour: Sunshine Tour
- Professional wins: 5

Number of wins by tour
- European Tour: 1
- Sunshine Tour: 4

Best results in major championships
- Masters Tournament: DNP
- PGA Championship: DNP
- U.S. Open: DNP
- The Open Championship: CUT: 2026

Michael Hollick (born 15 May 1987) is a South African professional golfer who currently plays on the European Tour and formerly played on the Sunshine Tour. He has won once on the European Tour, winning the 2026 BMW International Open.

== Professional wins (5) ==
=== European Tour wins (1) ===
No.	Date	Tournament	Winning score	Margin of victory	Runner-up
1	5 Jul 2026	BMW International Open	−18 (66-68-69-67=270)	1 stroke	(South Africa) Hennie du Plessis

=== Sunshine Tour wins (4) ===
Legend
Tour Championships (1)
Other Sunshine Tour (3)

No.	Date	Tournament	Winning score	Margin of victory	Runner(s)-up
1	4 Sep 2015	Sun Sibaya Challenge	−9 (67-70-67=204)	1 stroke	(South Africa) Jean Hugo, (Zambia) Madalitso Muthiya
2	12 May 2024	FBC Zim Open	−20 (66-67-68-67=268)	2 strokes	(South Africa) Darren Fichardt
3	30 Mar 2025	DNi Tour Championship	−19 (69-68-68-64=269)	1 stroke	(South Africa) George Coetzee, (South Africa) Jacques Kruyswijk
4	10 Aug 2025	FNB Eswatini Challenge	−16 (68-64-68=200)	2 strokes	(South Africa) Herman Loubser, (South Africa) Pieter Moolman

== Results in major championships ==
Tournament	2026
Masters Tournament	
PGA Championship	
U.S. Open	
The Open Championship	CUT

Did not play

CUT = missed the half-way cut
