= 2027 Asian Tour =

Golf tour season

2027 Asian Tour season
- Duration: 25 February 2027 – TBD
- Number of official events: TBD

The 2027 Asian Tour is the 32nd season of the modern Asian Tour (formerly the Asian PGA Tour), the main professional golf tour in Asia (outside of Japan) since it was established in 1995.

== European Tour partnership ==
A partnership with the European Tour was announced in 2026, resulting in the co-sanctioning of the Singapore Open and Hong Kong Open resuming again in 2027.

== Schedule ==
The following table lists official events during the 2027 season.

Date	Tournament	Host country	Purse (US$)	Winner (Note: The number in brackets after each winner's name is the number of Asian Tour events they had won up to and including that tournament. This information is only shown for Asian Tour members.)	OWGR points	Other tours (Note: ANZ − PGA Tour of Australasia; EUR− European Tour; KOR − Korean Tour.)	Notes
28 Feb	New Zealand Open	New Zealand	NZ$2,000,000			ANZ	
18 Apr	Deutsche Bank Singapore Open	Singapore				EUR	
4 Apr	Vietnam Golf Championship	Vietnam	500,000				New tournament
23 May	Kolon Korea Open	South Korea				KOR	
24 Oct	Hong Kong Open	Hong Kong				EUR	
