= Lyle Rowe =

South African professional golfer

Personal information
- Nationality: South Africa
- Born: 13 June 1987 (age 39)

Career
- Sport: Golf
- Turned professional: 2009
- Current tour: Sunshine Tour
- Professional wins: 5

Number of wins by tour
- Sunshine Tour: 3
- Other: 2

Lyle Rowe (born 13 June 1987) is a South African professional golfer.

== Career ==
Rowe plays on the Sunshine Tour and won his first tournament in June 2014 at the inaugural Zambia Sugar Open.

== Professional wins (5) ==
=== Sunshine Tour wins (3) ===
No.	Date	Tournament	Winning score	To par	Margin of victory	Runner-up
1	8 Jun 2014	Zambia Sugar Open	76-69-66-68=279	−13	4 strokes	(South Africa) Neil Schietekat
2	17 Apr 2016	Golden Pilsener Zimbabwe Open	69-69-72-67=277	−11	2 strokes	(South Africa) Dylan Frittelli
3	16 Oct 2021	Blue Label Challenge	33 pts (6-10-8-9=33)		4 points	(South Africa) Dylan Mostert

Sunshine Tour playoff record (0–1)

No.	Year	Tournament	Opponent	Result
1	2013	Vodacom Origins of Golf at Parys	(South Africa) Andrew Curlewis	Lost to birdie on first extra hole

=== Big Easy Tour wins (1) ===
No.	Date	Tournament	Winning score	To par	Margin of victory	Runner-up
1	19 Aug 2011	Benoni Country Club	69-69=138	−6	Playoff	(South Africa) Vaughn Groenewald

=== Jamega Pro Golf Tour wins (1) ===
No.	Date	Tournament	Winning score	To par	Margin of victory	Runner-up
1	12 Jul 2010	South Winchester	66-69=135	−9	1 stroke	(England) Daniel Brooks
