= 2026–27 Professional Golf Tour of India =

Golf tour season

2026–27 Professional Golf Tour of India season
- Duration: 17 November 2026 – 17 October 2027
- Number of official events: TBD

The 2026–27 Professional Golf Tour of India, titled as the 2026–27 DP World Professional Golf Tour of India for sponsorship reasons, is the 20th season of the Professional Golf Tour of India, the main professional golf tour in India since it was formed in 2006.

== Schedule ==
The following table lists official events during the 2026–27 season.

Date	Tournament	Location	Purse (₹)	Winner (Note: The number in brackets after each winner's name is the number of Professional Golf Tour of India events they had won up to and including that tournament.)	OWGR points	Other tours (Note: CHA − Challenge Tour; EUR − European Tour.)
20 Nov	IndianOil Servo Masters	Assam	10,000,000	(India) Raunil Kukar (1)	0.57	
4 Dec	Trident Open	Haryana	10,000,000			
11 Dec	Jaipur Open	Rajasthan	10,000,000			
18 Dec	CIDCO Open	Maharashtra	10,000,000			
27 Dec	Tata Open	Jharkhand	20,000,000			
21 Mar	Hero Indian Open	Haryana				EUR
17 Oct	DP World India Championship	Delhi				EUR
