= Ian Snyman =

South African professional golfer (born 1995)

Personal information
- Nationality: South Africa
- Born: 3 January 1995 (age 31) Bellville, South Africa

Career
- Sport: Golf
- College: University of North Texas
- Turned professional: 2018
- Current tour: Asian Tour
- Former tours: Sunshine Tour; Big Easy Tour
- Professional wins: 6

Number of wins by tour
- Asian Tour: 1
- Other: 5

Achievements and awards
- Conference USA Freshman of the Year: 2016
- Conference USA Golfer of the Year: 2018

Ian Snyman (born 3 January 1995) is a South African professional golfer who plays on the Asian Tour. He was runner-up at the 2025 New Zealand Open and won the 2026 Taiwan Glass Taifong Open.

== Amateur career ==
Snyman enrolled at the University of North Texas in 2015. He was named Conference USA Freshman of the Year and Golfer of the Year.

== Professional career ==
Snyman joined the 2020–21 Big Easy Tour where he won five tournaments and finished second in the season rankings. He graduated to the Sunshine Tour, where he was runner-up at the 2022 SunBet Challenge (Sun Sibaya), two strokes behind Dylan Naidoo.

Snyman secured his Asian Tour card at Qualifying School in early 2020, but the tour was soon put on halt and did not resume until late November the following year. In 2022, he performed well in the International Series. He tied for 3rd at the International Series Thailand, and his top-10 at the International Series England earned him a spot in the inaugural LIV Golf Invitational London. He also started the LIV Golf Invitational Portland, and collected $321,000 across the two events. He finished 19th on the Order of Merit his rookie season.

In 2025, he finished runner-up at the New Zealand Open, after he missed a six-foot putt on the 18th to force a play-off. In 2026, he tied for third at the Maekyung Open in Korea, and two weeks later he recorded his maiden Asian Tour victory at the Taiwan Glass Taifong Open.

== Professional wins (6) ==
=== Asian Tour wins (1) ===
| No. | Date | Tournament | Winning score | Margin of victory | Runners-up |
|---|---|---|---|---|---|
| 1 | 10 May 2026 | Taiwan Glass Taifong Open^{1} | −15 (68-67-69-69=273) | 2 strokes | (Hong Kong) Matthew Cheung, (Mexico) Santiago de la Fuente |

^{1}Co-sanctioned by the Taiwan PGA Tour

=== Big Easy Tour wins (5) ===
| No. | Date | Tournament | Winning score | Margin of victory | Runner(s)-up |
|---|---|---|---|---|---|
| 1 | 3 Mar 2021 | Big Easy Road to #7 | −7 (66-69-74=209) | 1 stroke | (South Africa) Bradley Diggeden, (South Africa) Richard Joubert, (South Africa) Gregory McKay |
| 2 | 21 Apr 2021 | Big Easy Road to #10 | −17 (62-70-67=199) | 5 strokes | (South Africa) Christiaan Burke, (South Africa) Matthew Rushton |
| 3 | 1 Sep 2021 | Big Easy Road to #14 | −13 (73-66-64=203) | 3 strokes | (South Africa) Zabastian de Jager |
| 4 | 22 Sep 2021 | Big Easy Road to #15 | −10 (67-67-72=206) | 1 stroke | (South Africa) Michael Kok |
| 5 | 10 Nov 2021 | Big Easy Play Off 1 | −15 (69-66-66=201) | Playoff | (South Africa) Kyle McClatchie |
