= Zambia Masters =

Zanaco Masters
Tournament information
- Location: Lusaka, Zambia
- Established: 2014
- Course: Lusaka Golf Club
- Par: 72
- Length: 7,011 yards (6,411 m)
- Tour: Sunshine Tour
- Format: Stroke play
- Prize fund: R 2,200,000
- Month played: May

Tournament record score
- Aggregate: 272 Vaughn Groenewald (2015)
- To par: −20 as above

Current champion
- (Zimbabwe) Robson Chinhoi

Location map
- Location in Zambia

The Zambia Masters, currently known for sponsorship reasons as the Zanaco Masters, is a golf tournament on the Sunshine Tour. It was first played in June 2014 as the Zambia Sugar Open. A tournament called the Zambia Sugar Open was played in 2013 but was a different event, the Zambia Open.

No tournaments took place in 2020 due to the COVID-19 pandemic. The 2021 tournament was again removed from the Sunshine Tour schedule and was played as a local event for Zambian professionals.

The event returned in 2023 after a three-year hiatus from the Sunshine Tour schedule.

== Winners ==
Year	Tour (Note: AFR − Sunshine Tour.)	Winner	Score	To par	Margin of victory	Runner(s)-up
Zanaco Masters
2026	AFR					
Zambia Masters
2025: No tournament
2024	AFR	Postponed				
Zanaco Masters
2023	AFR	(Zimbabwe) Robson Chinhoi	271	−17	Playoff	(South Africa) Neil Schietekat
2022: No tournament
2021	~~AFR~~ (Note: Tournament held without Sunshine Tour sanctioning due to the COVID-19 pandemic.)	(Zambia) Sydney Wemba	219	E	1 stroke	(Zambia) Dayne Moore
2020	AFR	No tournament due to the COVID-19 pandemic				
2019	AFR	(South Africa) J. C. Ritchie	274	−18	Playoff	(Wales) Rhys Enoch
2018	AFR	(South Africa) J. J. Senekal	274	−14	Playoff	(South Africa) Jaco Ahlers (South Africa) Andre de Decker (South Africa) Alex Haindl
Zambia Sugar Open
2017	AFR	(South Africa) Oliver Bekker	273	−19	2 strokes	(South Africa) Jared Harvey
2016	AFR	(Sweden) Christofer Blomstrand	276	−16	3 strokes	(South Africa) CJ du Plessis
2015	AFR	(South Africa) Vaughn Groenewald	272	−20	4 strokes	(South Africa) Jean Hugo
2014	AFR	(South Africa) Lyle Rowe	279	−13	4 strokes	(South Africa) Neil Schietekat
