= 2024–25 Big Easy Tour =

Golf tour season

2024–25 Big Easy Tour season
- Duration: 25 June 2024 – 14 March 2025
- Number of official events: 12
- Most wins: (South Africa) Paul Boshoff (2) (South Africa) Warwick Purchase (2)
- Order of Merit: (South Africa) Warwick Purchase

The 2024–25 Big Easy Tour, titled as the 2024–25 Betway Big Easy Tour for sponsorship reasons, was the 13th season of the Big Easy Tour, the official development tour to the Sunshine Tour.

== Betway title sponsorship ==
In June 2024, it was announced that the tour had signed a title sponsorship agreement with Betway, being renamed as the Betway Big Easy Tour.

== Schedule ==
The following table lists official events during the 2024–25 season.

Date	Tournament	Location	Purse (R)	Winner (Note: The number in brackets after each winner's name is the number of Big Easy Tour events they had won up to and including that tournament. It is rare for someone to accumulate many wins on the Big Easy Tour as success at this level usually leads to promotion to the Sunshine Tour.)	OWGR points
27 Jun	Betway Big Easy Tour 1	Gauteng	150,000	(South Africa) Leon Vorster (2)	0.37
18 Jul	Betway Big Easy Tour 2	Gauteng	150,000	(South Africa) Marcel Steyn Scholtz (1)	0.57
7 Aug	Betway Big Easy Tour 3	Gauteng	150,000	(South Africa) Warwick Purchase (1)	0.46
26 Sep	Betway Big Easy Tour 4	Gauteng	150,000	(South Africa) Slade Pickering (3)	0.30
24 Oct	Betway Big Easy Tour 5	Gauteng	150,000	(South Africa) Graham van der Merwe (1)	0.33
7 Nov	Betway Big Easy Tour 6	Gauteng	150,000	(South Africa) Musiwalo Nethunzwi (2)	0.32
21 Nov	Betway Big Easy Tour 7	Gauteng	150,000	(South Africa) Paul Boshoff (2)	0.24
28 Nov	Betway Big Easy Tour 8	Gauteng	150,000	(South Africa) Paul Boshoff (3)	0.35
16 Jan	Betway Big Easy Tour 9	Gauteng	150,000	(South Africa) Luke Mayo (1)	0.37
23 Jan	Betway Big Easy Tour 10	Gauteng	150,000	(South Africa) Ryan van der Klis (1)	0.40
21 Feb	Betway Big Easy Tour Play Off	Gauteng	150,000	(England) Joe Knox (1)	0.25
14 Mar	Betway Big Easy Tour Final	Gauteng	300,000	(South Africa) Warwick Purchase (2)	0.28

== Order of Merit ==
The Order of Merit was based on tournament results during the season, calculated using a points-based system. The top 12 players on the Order of Merit (not otherwise exempt) earned status to play on the 2025–26 Sunshine Tour.

Position	Player	Points
1	(South Africa) Warwick Purchase	888
2	(England) Joe Knox	799
3	(South Africa) Graham van der Merwe	742
4	(South Africa) Paul Boshoff	694
5	(South Africa) Xander Basson	640
6	(South Africa) Ulrich van den Berg	621
7	(South Africa) Slade Pickering	610
8	(South Africa) Luke Mayo	577
9	(South Africa) Ryan van der Klis	599
10	(South Africa) Musiwalo Nethunzwi	452
11	(South Africa) Leon Vorster	427
12	(Indonesia) Eric Wowor	405
13	(South Africa) Marcel Steyn Scholtz	386
