= 2027 European Tour =

Golf tour season

2027 European Tour season
- Duration: 26 November 2026 – 14 November 2027
- Number of official events: 43

The 2027 European Tour, titled as the 2027 DP World Tour for sponsorship reasons, will be the 56th season of the European Tour, the main professional golf tour in Europe since its inaugural season in 1972.

It will be the sixth season of the tour under a title sponsorship agreement with DP World that was announced in November 2021.

== Changes for 2027 ==
The full schedule was announced in September 2026. The Hong Kong Open and Deutsche Bank Singapore Open returned to the schedule, both events being co-sanctioned with the Asian Tour.

== Schedule ==
The following table lists official events during the 2027 season.

Date	Tournament	Host country	Purse (US$)	R2D points	Winner (Note: The number in brackets after each winner's name is the number of European Tour events they had won up to and including that tournament. This information is only shown for European Tour members.)	OWGR points	Other tours (Note: AFR − Sunshine Tour; ANZ − PGA Tour of Australasia; ASA − Asian Tour; CHN − China Tour; PGAT − PGA Tour; PGTI − Professional Golf Tour of India.)	Notes
29 Nov	BMW Australian PGA Championship	Australia	A$2,500,000	3,000			ANZ	
6 Dec	Capital.com Australian Open	Australia	A$2,500,000	3,000			ANZ	
6 Dec	Nedbank Golf Challenge	South Africa	6,000,000	4,000			AFR	Limited-field event
13 Dec	AfrAsia Bank Mauritius Open	Mauritius	1,500,000	3,000			AFR	
24 Jan	Hero Dubai Desert Classic	UAE	9,000,000	8,000				Rolex Series
31 Jan	Bapco Energies Bahrain Championship	Bahrain		3,500				
6 Feb	Qatar Masters	Qatar		3,500				
21 Feb	Magical Kenya Open	Kenya		3,500				
28 Feb	Alfred Dunhill Championship	South Africa	€2,000,000	3,500			AFR	
7 Mar	Investec South African Open Championship	South Africa	2,000,000	3,500			AFR	
14 Mar	Joburg Open	South Africa	R20,500,000	3,000			AFR	
21 Mar	Hero Indian Open	India		3,500			PGTI	
28 Mar	China Classic	China		3,500			CHN	
11 Apr	Masters Tournament	United States		10,000		100		Major championship
18 Apr	Deutsche Bank Singapore Open	Singapore		3,500			ASA	
25 Apr	Volvo China Open	China		3,500			CHN	
2 May	Turkish Airlines Open	Turkey		3,500				
9 May	Estrella Damm Catalunya Championship	Spain		3,500				
16 May	Open de Portugal	Portugal		3,500				
23 May	PGA Championship	United States		10,000		100		Major championship
30 Jun	BMW International Open	Germany		3,500				
6 Jun	Soudal Open	Belgium		3,500				
13 Jun	KLM Open	Netherlands		3,500				
20 Jun	U.S. Open	United States		10,000		100		Major championship
27 Jun	DS Automobiles Open d'Italia	Italy		3,500				
4 Jul	Amgen Irish Open	Ireland		3,500				
11 Jul	Genesis Scottish Open	Scotland		8,000			PGAT	Rolex Series
11 Jul	ISCO Championship	United States		3,500			PGAT	
18 Jul	The Open Championship	Scotland		10,000		100		Major championship
18 Jul	Corales Puntacana Championship	Dominican Republic		3,500			PGAT	
22 Aug	Husqvarna British Masters	England		5,000				
5 Sep	Omega European Masters	Switzerland		5,000				
12 Sep	FedEx Open de France	France		5,000				
26 Sep	BMW PGA Championship	England		8,000				Rolex Series
3 Oct	Alfred Dunhill Links Championship	Scotland		5,000				
10 Oct	Open de España	Spain		5,000				
17 Oct	DP World India Championship	India		5,000			PGTI	
24 Oct	Hong Kong Open	Hong Kong		5,000			ASA	
7 Nov	Abu Dhabi Championship	UAE		9,000				Playoff event (Note: Also a Rolex Series tournament.)
14 Nov	DP World Tour Championship	UAE		12,000				Playoff event

=== Unofficial events ===
The following events were sanctioned by the European Tour, but did not carry official money, nor were wins official.

Date	Tournament	Host country	Purse	Winners	OWGR points	Notes
17 Jan	Team Cup	UAE	n/a		n/a	Team event
19 Sep	Ryder Cup	Ireland	n/a		n/a	Team event
