= Deon Germishuys =

South African professional golfer (born 1995)

Personal information
- Nationality: South Africa
- Born: 22 October 1999 (age 27) Pretoria, South Africa

Career
- Sport: Golf
- Turned professional: 2019
- Current tours: Sunshine Tour; Challenge Tour
- Former tour: European Tour
- Professional wins: 4

Number of wins by tour
- Sunshine Tour: 4

Best results in major championships
- Masters Tournament: DNP
- PGA Championship: DNP
- U.S. Open: CUT: 2023
- The Open Championship: DNP

Deon Germishuys (born 22 October 1999) is a South African professional golfer and European Tour player. He plays on the Sunshine Tour, where he has won three tournaments.

== Early life and amateur career ==
Germishuys was born in Pretoria. He won the 2016 South African Boys U19 Championship and the 2018 South African Amateur Championship. A part of the national squad, he represented South Africa at the Junior Golf World Cup in Japan and finished 4th in the North and South Men's Amateur Golf Championship at Pinehurst Resort in 2018.

== Professional career ==
Germishuys turned professional in March 2019 while still a teenager. He joined the Sunshine Tour, where he was runner-up at the Vodacom Origins of Golf at Stellenbosch in October, a stroke behind Thriston Lawrence. He secured his maiden title at the inaugural Sishen Classic in his fourth season, beating Louis de Jager in second by six strokes.

In 2022 Germishuys joined the Challenge Tour, where he was runner-up at the Hopps Open de Provence, three strokes behind Joel Sjöholm. He finished 20th in the season rankings to graduate to the 2023 European Tour, where he tied for 3rd alongside Rasmus Højgaard in the KLM Open at Bernardus Golf, three strokes behind winner Pablo Larrazabal, and finished 125th in the Order of Merit.

In 2024 he was runner-up at the SDC Open before winning the Limpopo Championship. Back on the European Tour in 2025, he finished 3rd at the Magical Kenya Open, five strokes behind winner Jacques Kruyswijk.

Germishuys secured his third professional title at the 2025 South African PGA Championship, South Africa's second oldest professional golf tournament and one of the most prestigious on the Sunshine Tour.

== Personal life ==
Professional golfer James Kingston is his father-in-law.

== Amateur wins ==
- 2016 South African Boys U19 Championship
- 2017 Southern Cape Open
- 2018 South African Amateur Championship, All Africa Juniors Challenge

== Professional wins (4) ==
=== Sunshine Tour wins (4) ===
No.	Date	Tournament	Winning score	Margin of victory	Runner(s)-up
1	29 May 2022	Sishen Classic	−17 (66-71-70-64=271)	6 strokes	(South Africa) Louis de Jager
2	7 Apr 2024	Limpopo Championship	−22 (66-66-68-66=266)	2 strokes	(South Africa) Jacques Blaauw
3	30 Nov 2025	Fitch & Leedes PGA Championship	−14 (70-65-70-69=274)	1 stroke	(South Africa) Hennie du Plessis, (South Africa) Samuel Simpson
4	25 Oct 2026	Stella Artois Players Championship	−19 (67-67-67-68=269)	Playoff	(South Africa) Cole Stevens

Sunshine Tour playoff record (1–1)

No.	Year	Tournament	Opponent	Result
1	2026	SDC Open	(South Africa) M. J. Viljoen	Lost to birdie on first extra hole
1	2026	Stella Artois Players Championship	(South Africa) Cole Stevens	Won with birdie on first extra hole

== Playoff record ==
Challenge Tour playoff record (0–1)

No.	Year	Tournament	Opponent	Result
1	2026	SDC Open	(South Africa) M. J. Viljoen	Won with birdie on first extra hole

== Team appearances ==
Amateur

- Junior Golf World Cup (representing South Africa): 2018

== See also ==
- 2022 Challenge Tour graduates
- 2024 Challenge Tour graduates
