= 2017 Big Easy Tour =

Golf tour season

2017 Big Easy Tour season
- Duration: 2 May 2017 – 19 October 2017
- Number of official events: 11
- Order of Merit: (South Africa) Jacquin Hess

The 2017 Big Easy Tour was the seventh season of the Big Easy Tour, the official development tour to the Sunshine Tour.

== Schedule ==
The following table lists official events during the 2017 season.

Date	Tournament	Location	Purse (R)	Winner (Note: The number in brackets after each winner's name is the number of Big Easy Tour events they had won up to and including that tournament. It is rare for someone to accumulate many wins on the Big Easy Tour as success at this level usually leads to promotion to the Sunshine Tour.)	OWGR points	Other tours (Note: MENA − MENA Golf Tour.)
3 May	Round 1	Gauteng	150,000	(South Africa) Kyle McClatchie (a) (1)	n/a	
18 May	Round 2	Gauteng	150,000	(South Africa) Marco Steyn (a) (1)	n/a	
25 May	Round 3	Gauteng	150,000	(South Africa) Chris Cannon (1)	n/a	
9 Jun	South to East Challenge	Gauteng	US$30,000	(South Africa) Breyten Meyer (1)	3	MENA
15 Jun	Joburg City Masters	Gauteng	US$30,000	(South Africa) Jaco Prinsloo (2)	3	MENA
22 Jun	'The Roar'	Gauteng	US$30,000	(South Africa) Daniel Hammond (3)	3	MENA
5 Jul	Houghton GC	Gauteng	150,000	(South Africa) Wynand Dingle (1)	n/a	
11 Jul	Wanderers GC	Gauteng	150,000	(South Africa) Pieter Kruger (3)	n/a	
19 Jul	Glendower GC	Gauteng	150,000	(South Africa) Musiwalo Nethunzwi (1)	n/a	
4 Oct	King's Cup	Gauteng	150,000	(South Africa) Bryandrew Roelofsz (2)	n/a	
19 Oct	Big Easy Tour Championship	Gauteng	250,000	(South Africa) Jacquin Hess (1)	n/a	

== Order of Merit ==
The Order of Merit was based on prize money won during the season, calculated in South African rand. The top five players on the Order of Merit earned status to play on the 2018–19 Sunshine Tour.

Position	Player	Prize money (R)
1	(South Africa) Jacquin Hess	75,162
2	(South Africa) Wynand Dingle	50,139
3	(Portugal) Antonio Rosado	49,559
4	(South Africa) Jacques P. de Villiers	49,358
5	(South Africa) Pieter Kruger	49,292
