= Christiaan Bezuidenhout =

South African professional golfer (born 1994)

Personal information
- Nickname: C-Bez
- Nationality: South Africa
- Born: 18 May 1994 (age 32) Delmas, Mpumalanga, South Africa
- Spouse: Kristen Hart (m. 2021)

Career
- Sport: Golf
- Turned professional: 2015
- Current tours: PGA Tour; Sunshine Tour
- Former tour: European Tour
- Professional wins: 10
- Highest ranking: 33 (31 January 2021) (as of 25 October 2026)

Number of wins by tour
- European Tour: 3
- Sunshine Tour: 4
- Challenge Tour: 1
- Other: 5

Best results in major championships
- Masters Tournament: T38: 2020
- PGA Championship: T30: 2021
- U.S. Open: T12: 2025
- The Open Championship: T34: 2025

Achievements and awards
- Big Easy Tour Order of Merit winner: 2015
- Sunshine Tour Rookie of the Year: 2016–17
- Sunshine Tour Order of Merit winner: 2020–21

Christiaan Bezuidenhout (pronounced [ˈkrəstijɑːn bəˈzœydənˌɦœut]; born 18 May 1994) is a South African professional golfer who is a three-time winner on the European Tour. He won the 2019 Estrella Damm N.A. Andalucía Masters and, in consecutive weeks, the 2020 Alfred Dunhill Championship and 2020 South African Open.

== Amateur career ==
As an amateur, Bezuidenhout received a drug suspension after testing positive for beta blockers at the 2014 Amateur Championship. Bezuidenhout was using them for anxiety and a stutter after an accidental poisoning at the age of two. The suspension was originally for two years but was later reduced to nine months.

== Professional career ==
Bezuidenhout turned professional in early 2015. He had success in September 2015 winning two 36-hole events on the Big Easy Tour, losing in a playoff for the Big Easy Tour Championship and also winning the Order of Merit.

In December 2015, Bezuidenhout won the Sunshine Tour Q School. In the first event of the season, the 2016 BMW SA Open, co-sanctioned with the European Tour, he finished runner-up to Brandon Stone. Later in 2016, he won a smaller tournament on the Sunshine Tour, the Sun Fish River Challenge, and finished runner-up in the Vodacom Origins of Golf Final. Bezuidenhout started 2017 with 5th-place finishes in both the Eye of Africa PGA Championship and the Dimension Data Pro-Am. He was the 2016–17 Sunshine Tour Rookie of the Year, awarded the Bobby Locke Trophy.

Bezuidenhout played several 2017 Challenge Tour events. He finished tied for 25th place in the European Tour Q-School to gain a place on the main tour for 2018. Bezuidenhout made the cut in 20 of his 26 2018 European Tour starts. His best finish was tied for 17th place, and he finished 105th in the Order of Merit, just retaining his card for 2019.

Bezuidenhout was one of nine runners-up in the 2019 Commercial Bank Qatar Masters behind Justin Harding. He also tied for 4th place in the Hero Indian Open and third place in the BMW International Open. The following week he won the Estrella Damm N.A. Andalucía Masters and with the win earned entry into the 2019 Open Championship. He was third in the 2019 BMW PGA Championship to enter the world top 100 for the first time and finished the season 18th in the European Tour Order of Merit.

In January 2020, Bezuidenhout lost in a sudden death playoff at the Omega Dubai Desert Classic to Lucas Herbert. Playing his final hole, he held the outright lead but found the water with his third shot resulting in a bogey finish. He lost the playoff to a birdie on the second extra hole. The following month he won the Dimension Data Pro-Am in South Africa and advanced into the top 50 on the Official World Golf Ranking. Bezuidenhout trailed by a stroke coming to the final hole but made an eagle 3 to beat George Coetzee by one.

In November 2020, Bezuidenhout won the Alfred Dunhill Championship at Leopard Creek Country Club. A final round 69 was good enough to help him win by four shots. 54-hole leader Adrian Meronk let his lead slide by shooting a final round 76. A week later, Bezuidenhout claimed a wire-to-wire victory at the South African Open which was played at Gary Player Country Club. He became the first player with back-to-back victories on the European Tour since Justin Rose in 2017.

Bezuidenhout recorded his best finish on the PGA Tour in July 2022. He finished tied-second at the John Deere Classic, three shots behind J. T. Poston. This result also gave him a place in the 2022 Open Championship.

In September 2022, Bezuidenhout was selected for the International team in the 2022 Presidents Cup; he played two matches, winning one and tying the other.

In January 2024, Bezuidenhout tied his best finish on the PGA Tour with a runner-up finish at The American Express; one shot behind amateur Nick Dunlap. He claimed first place prize money due to Dunlap's amateur status.

== Professional wins (10) ==
=== European Tour wins (3) ===
No.	Date	Tournament	Winning score	Margin of victory	Runner(s)-up
1	30 Jun 2019	Estrella Damm N.A. Andalucía Masters	−10 (66-68-69-71=274)	6 strokes	(Spain) Adri Arnaus, (Spain) Eduardo de la Riva, (France) Mike Lorenzo-Vera, (Spain) Álvaro Quirós, (Spain) Jon Rahm
2	29 Nov 2020	Alfred Dunhill Championship^{1}	−14 (69-68-68-69=274)	4 strokes	(England) Richard Bland, (United States) Sean Crocker, (Poland) Adrian Meronk, (South Africa) Jayden Schaper
3	6 Dec 2020	South African Open^{1}	−18 (67-67-67-69=270)	5 strokes	(Wales) Jamie Donaldson

^{1}Co-sanctioned by the Sunshine Tour

European Tour playoff record (0–1)

No.	Year	Tournament	Opponent	Result
1	2020	Omega Dubai Desert Classic	(Australia) Lucas Herbert	Lost to birdie on second extra hole

=== Sunshine Tour wins (4) ===
Legend
Flagship events (1)
Other Sunshine Tour (3)

No.	Date	Tournament	Winning score	Margin of victory	Runner(s)-up
1	14 Oct 2016	Sun Fish River Challenge	−8 (69-69-70=208)	2 strokes	(South Africa) Daniel van Tonder
2	16 Feb 2020	Dimension Data Pro-Am^{1}	−25 (61-67-69-67=264)	1 stroke	(South Africa) George Coetzee
3	29 Nov 2020	Alfred Dunhill Championship^{2}	−14 (69-68-68-69=274)	5 strokes	(England) Richard Bland, (United States) Sean Crocker, (Poland) Adrian Meronk, (South Africa) Jayden Schaper
4	6 Dec 2020	South African Open^{2}	−18 (67-67-67-69=270)	5 strokes	(Wales) Jamie Donaldson

^{1}Co-sanctioned by the Challenge Tour
^{2}Co-sanctioned by the European Tour

=== Big Easy Tour wins (2) ===
No.	Date	Tournament	Winning score	Margin of victory	Runner(s)-up
1	4 Sep 2015	King's Cup	−10 (67-67=134)	3 strokes	(South Africa) Riekus Nortje
2	9 Sep 2015	Glendower GC	−1 (68-75=143)	1 stroke	(South Korea) Kim Dong-kwan, (South Africa) Michael Palmer

=== IGT Pro Tour wins (3) ===
No.	Date	Tournament	Winning score	Margin of victory	Runner(s)-up
1	25 Mar 2015	Centurion Academy Classic	−13 (71-65-67=203)	2 strokes	(South Africa) Werner van Niekerk
2	25 Jul 2015	Sishen Classic	−12 (71-66-67=204)	4 strokes	(South Africa) Russell Franz, (South Africa) Theunis Spangenberg
3	5 Aug 2015	Pro Squad Classic	−5 (68-68-75=211)	4 strokes	(South Africa) N. J. Arnoldi, (South Africa) T. J. Bekker, (South Africa) Conway Kunneke

== Results in major championships ==
Results not in chronological order in 2020.

Tournament	2019	2020	2021	2022	2023	2024	2025	2026
Masters Tournament		T38	T40	T44			CUT	
PGA Championship		CUT	T30	CUT	CUT	CUT	T50	T35
U.S. Open		55	T31			T32	T12	
The Open Championship	CUT	NT	T53	T68	T49	CUT	T34	

Did not play

CUT = missed the half-way cut
"T" indicates a tie for a place
NT = no tournament due to COVID-19 pandemic

=== Summary ===
Tournament	Wins	2nd	3rd	Top-5	Top-10	Top-25	Events	Cuts made
Masters Tournament	0	0	0	0	0	0	4	3
PGA Championship	0	0	0	0	0	0	7	3
U.S. Open	0	0	0	0	0	1	4	4
The Open Championship	0	0	0	0	0	0	6	4
Totals	0	0	0	0	0	1	21	14

- Most consecutive cuts made – 7 (2020 U.S. Open – 2022 Masters)
- Longest streak of top-10s – none

== Results in The Players Championship ==
Tournament	2021	2022	2023	2024	2025	2026
The Players Championship	T41		T13	T13	CUT	CUT

Did not play

CUT = missed the halfway cut
"T" indicates a tie for a place

== Results in World Golf Championships ==
Tournament	2019	2020	2021	2022	2023
Championship		T29	T32		
Match Play		NT^{1}	T56	T60	T59
Invitational		T20			
Champions	T17	NT^{1}	NT^{1}	NT^{1}	

^{1}Cancelled due to COVID-19 pandemic

Did not play

NT = No tournament
"T" = Tied
Note that the Championship and Invitational were discontinued from 2022. The Champions was discontinued from 2023.

== Team appearances ==
Professional

- Presidents Cup (representing the International team): 2022, 2024, 2026

== See also ==
- 2017 European Tour Qualifying School graduates
- 2021 Korn Ferry Tour Finals graduates
