= Limpopo Championship =

Tournament information
- Location: Modimolle, South Africa
- Established: 2019
- Course: Euphoria Golf Club
- Par: 72
- Length: 7,699 yards (7,040 m)
- Tours: Sunshine Tour; Challenge Tour
- Format: Stroke play
- Prize fund: R 2,500,000
- Month played: October

Tournament record score
- Aggregate: 266 Deon Germishuys (2024)
- To par: −22 as above

Current champion
- (South Africa) Kyle Barker

Location map
- Location in South Africa Location in Limpopo

The Limpopo Championship is a golf tournament on the Sunshine Tour played at Euphoria Golf & Lifestyle Estate in Modimolle, Limpopo, South Africa.

== History ==
The tournament was first played in March 2019 with prize money of R 1,500,000. J. C. Ritchie won the event on the first hole of a playoff with Steve Surry. The second edition was played in early 2020. It was co-sanctioned with the Challenge Tour and had increased prize money of US$250,000 (R3,500,000). Because of the large field, a second venue, Koro Creek Bushveld Golf Estate, was used for the first two rounds. Ritchie retained the title in 2020, beating Wilco Nienaber by two strokes. The 2021 event was played at Euphoria in April and was again co-sanctioned with the Challenge Tour with prize money of R3,000,000. It was won in a four-man playoff by Brandon Stone, who made a birdie at the first extra hole. The 2022 event was again co-sanctioned by the Challenge Tour, with Mateusz Gradecki winning by three shots ahead of Hennie du Plessis.

In 2023, the event was not part of the Challenge Tour schedule and was a sole-sanctioned Sunshine Tour event. Ryan van Velzen won the title, with the tournament being shortened to 54 holes due to rain. The event returned for the final time in 2024, again as a sole-sanctioned Sunshine Tour event. Deon Germishuys won the title by two shots over Jacques Blaauw.

== Winners ==
Year	Tour(s) (Note: AFR − Sunshine Tour; CHA − Challenge Tour.)	Winner	Score	To par	Margin of victory	Runner(s)-up
2026	AFR	(South Africa) Kyle Barker	279	−9	Playoff	(South Africa) Cole Stevens
2025	AFR	(South Africa) Pieter Moolman	276	−12	2 strokes	(South Africa) Kyle de Beer (South Africa) Rupert Kaminski (South Africa) Altin van der Merwe
2024	AFR	(South Africa) Deon Germishuys	266	−22	2 strokes	(South Africa) Jacques Blaauw
2023	AFR	(South Africa) Ryan van Velzen	204 (Note: Shortened to 54 holes due to rain.)	−12	1 stroke	(South Africa) Luca Filippi (South Africa) Jaco Prinsloo (South Africa) Daniel van Tonder
2022	AFR, CHA	(Poland) Mateusz Gradecki	269	−19	3 strokes	(South Africa) Hennie du Plessis
2021	AFR, CHA	(South Africa) Brandon Stone	280	−8	Playoff	(South Africa) Oliver Bekker (South Africa) Hennie du Plessis (South Africa) Daniel van Tonder
2020	AFR, CHA	(South Africa) J. C. Ritchie (2)	269	−19	2 strokes	(South Africa) Wilco Nienaber
2019	AFR	(South Africa) J. C. Ritchie	270	−18	Playoff	(England) Steve Surry
