= 2025–26 Big Easy Tour =

Golf tour season

2025–26 Big Easy Tour season
- Duration: 6 May 2025 – 19 March 2026
- Number of official events: 17
- Most wins: (South Africa) Jacques van der Merwe (3)
- Order of Merit: (England) Joe Sullivan

The 2025–26 Big Easy Tour, titled as the 2025–26 Betway Big Easy Tour for sponsorship reasons, was the 14th season of the Big Easy Tour, the official development tour to the Sunshine Tour.

== Schedule ==
The following table lists official events during the 2025–26 season.

Date	Tournament	Location	Purse (R)	Winner (Note: The number in brackets after each winner's name is the number of Big Easy Tour events they had won up to and including that tournament. It is rare for someone to accumulate many wins on the Big Easy Tour as success at this level usually leads to promotion to the Sunshine Tour.)	OWGR points
8 May	Betway Big Easy Tour 1	Gauteng	150,000	(South Africa) Ulrich van den Berg (1)	0.39
14 May	Betway Big Easy Blue Label Invitational 1	Gauteng	150,000	(South Africa) Lyle Pedro (1)	n/a
22 May	Betway Big Easy Tour 2	Gauteng	150,000	(England) Harry Konig (1)	0.54
4 Jun	Betway Big Easy Blue Label Invitational 2	Gauteng	150,000	(England) Joe Sullivan (1)	n/a
12 Jun	Betway Big Easy Tour 3	Gauteng	150,000	(South Africa) Tyrone Ryan (3)	0.62
19 Jun	Betway Big Easy Tour 4	Gauteng	150,000	(Australia) Austin Bautista (1)	0.57
30 Jul	Betway Big Easy Blue Label Invitational 3	Gauteng	150,000	(South Africa) Marcel Steyn Scholtz (2)	0.82
7 Aug	Betway Big Easy Tour 5	Gauteng	150,000	(South Africa) Jacques van der Merwe (1)	0.40
14 Aug	Betway Big Easy Tour 6	Gauteng	150,000	(South Africa) Jacques van der Merwe (2)	0.44
18 Sep	Betway Big Easy Tour 7	Gauteng	150,000	(England) Harry Konig (2)	0.41
30 Sep	Betway Big Easy Blu Label Unlimited Invitational 4	Gauteng	150,000	(South Africa) Kian Rose (1)	0.57
30 Oct	Betway Big Easy Tour 8	Gauteng	150,000	(South Africa) Daniel Cronje (1)	0.53
5 Nov	Betway Big Easy Blu Label Unlimited Invitational 5	Gauteng	150,000	(England) Joe Sullivan (2)	0.54
13 Nov	Betway Big Easy Tour 9	Gauteng	150,000	(South Africa) Jacques van der Merwe (3)	0.28
22 Jan	Betway Big Easy Tour 10	Gauteng	150,000	(England) Jake Bolton (1)	0.22
29 Jan	Betway Big Easy Tour Play Off	Gauteng	250,000	(South Africa) Daniel Cronje (2)	0.22
19 Mar	Betway Big Easy Tour Final	Gauteng	300,000	(South Africa) Oliver Goldhill (1)	0.18

== Order of Merit ==
The Order of Merit was based on tournament results during the season, calculated using a points-based system. The top 12 players on the Order of Merit earned status to play on the 2026–27 Sunshine Tour.

Position	Player	Points
1	(England) Joe Sullivan	1,397
2	(South Africa) Daniel Cronje	1,343
3	(South Africa) Oliver Goldhill	1,123
4	(South Africa) Jacques van der Merwe	1,007
5	(South Africa) Tristan Leonard	818
6	(England) Harry Konig	704
7	(South Africa) Travis Procter	691
8	(South Africa) Brandon Pieters	674
9	(South Africa) Dillon Germshuys	631
10	(South Africa) Kian Rose	520
11	(South Africa) Jaden Deltel	518
12	(South Africa) Ulrich van den Berg	446

== Sunshine Development Tour ==
2025–26 Sunshine Development Tour season
- Duration: 3 June 2025 – 21 January 2026
- Number of official events: 10
- Most wins: (Kenya) Njoroge Kibugu (4)
- Order of Merit: (Kenya) Njoroge Kibugu

The 2025–26 Sunshine Development Tour was the inaugural season of the Sunshine Development Tour, a development tour to the Sunshine Tour, alongside the Big Easy Tour.

=== Schedule ===
The following table lists official events during the 2025–26 season.

Date	Tournament	Host country	Purse (KSh)	Winner (Note: The number in brackets after each winner's name is the number of Sunshine Development Tour events they had won up to and including that tournament.)	OWGR points
5 Jun	SunDev East Africa Thika Greens	Kenya	2,000,000	(Kenya) Njoroge Kibugu (1)	0.22
11 Jun	SunDev East Africa Swing Ruiru Sports Club	Kenya	2,000,000	(Kenya) Dismas Indiza (1)	0.29
6 Aug	SunDev East Africa Swing Nyali Golf & Country Club	Kenya	2,000,000	(Kenya) Njoroge Kibugu (2)	0.20
11 Aug	SunDev East Africa Swing Johnnie Walker Classic	Kenya	2,000,000	(Rwanda) Celestin Nsanzuwera (1)	0.19
5 Sep	SunDev East Africa Swing SportsBiz Africa Championship	Rwanda	US$25,000	(Rwanda) Celestin Nsanzuwera (2)	0.31
15 Oct	SunDev Royal Nairobi	Kenya	2,000,000	(Kenya) John Lejirma (a) (1)	0.26
4 Nov	SunDev Betika Vetlab Masters	Kenya	2,000,000	(Kenya) Njoroge Kibugu (3)	0.25
11 Nov	SunDev Betika Limuru Masters	Kenya	2,000,000	(Kenya) Greg Snow (1)	0.28
16 Jan	SunDev Absa Thika Greens	Kenya	2,000,000	(Uganda) Willy Deus (1)	0.20
21 Jan	SunDev Absa Invitational Series - Karen Tour Final	Kenya	2,000,000	(Kenya) Njoroge Kibugu (4)	0.27

=== Order of Merit ===
The Order of Merit was based on tournament results during the season, calculated using a points-based system.

Position	Player	Points
1	(Kenya) Njoroge Kibugu	1,497
2	(Rwanda) Celestin Nsanzuwera	1,317
3	(Kenya) Dismas Indiza	753
4	(Kenya) John Lejirma (a)	606
5	(Kenya) Greg Snow	579
