= 2022 Challenge Tour graduates =

This is a list of players who graduated from the Challenge Tour in 2022. The top 20 players on the Challenge Tour rankings in 2022 earned European Tour cards for 2023.

		2022 Challenge Tour		2023 European Tour				
Player		Points rank	Points	Starts	Cuts made	Best finish	Points rank	Points
(England)	Nathan Kimsey	1	208,918	22	19	2nd	35	1,424
(Switzerland)	Jeremy Freiburghaus*	2	160,025	31	9	T32	178	128
(Germany)	Alexander Knappe	3	146,052	32	12	T3	114	462
(South Africa)	J. C. Ritchie^{†}	4	141,286	28	11	T10	137	336
(Sweden)	Mikael Lindberg*	5	139,848	31	11	T12	142	299
(Sweden)	Jens Dantorp	6	133,772	32	16	2nd	48	1,069
(New Zealand)	Daniel Hillier*	7	123,473	27	18	Win	30	1,051
(Denmark)	Oliver Hundebøll*	8	123,082	29	7	T28	173	147
(Germany)	Freddy Schott*	9	122,456	32	12	T10	144	295
(Northern Ireland)	Tom McKibbin*	10	120,719	31	21	Win	44	1,217
(France)	Robin Sciot-Siegrist	11	115,586	29	15	T13	140	307
(Norway)	Kristian Krogh Johannessen	12	115,055	24	12	T3	124	398
(France)	Clément Sordet	13	110,267	26	10	2nd	99	531
(Denmark)	Martin Simonsen*	14	109,809	30	9	T15	161	191
(France)	Jeong-Weon Ko*	15	109,659	31	16	T4	115	461
(England)	Todd Clements*	16	109,283	30	17	Win	72	734
(England)	John Parry	17	108,633	27	13	T4 (x2)	131	353
(South Africa)	Bryce Easton^{†}	18	105,179	30	12	T14	138	327
(England)	Matthew Baldwin	19	102,933	30	20	Win	69	810
(South Africa)	Deon Germishuys*	20	95,045	28	16	T3	125	392

*European Tour rookie in 2023
^{†}First-time full member, but ineligible for Rookie of the Year award
The player retained his European Tour card for 2024 (finished inside the top 116).
The player did not retain his European Tour card for 2024, but retained conditional status (finished between 117 and 154, inclusive).
The player did not retain his European Tour card for 2024 (finished outside the top 154).

== Wins on the European Tour in 2023 ==
No.	Date	Player	Tournament	Winning score	Margin of victory	Runner(s)-up
1	19 Mar	(England) Matthew Baldwin	SDC Championship	−18 (70-67-65-68=270)	7 strokes	(Spain) Adri Arnaus
2	4 Jun	(Northern Ireland) Tom McKibbin	Porsche European Open	−9 (72-69-72-70=283)	2 strokes	(France) Julien Guerrier (Germany) Maximilian Kieffer (Germany) Marcel Siem
3	2 Jul	(New Zealand) Daniel Hillier	Betfred British Masters	−10 (72-71-69-66=278)	2 strokes	(United States) Gunner Wiebe (England) Oliver Wilson
4	27 Aug	(England) Todd Clements	D+D Real Czech Masters	−22 (65-69-69-63=266)	1 stroke	(England) Matt Wallace

== Runner-up finishes on the European Tour in 2023 ==
No.	Date	Player	Tournament	Winner	Winning score	Runner-up score
1	4 Dec 2022	(France) Clément Sordet	Investec South African Open Championship	(South Africa) Thriston Lawrence	−16 (64-67-67-74=272)	−15 (68-66-66-73=273)
2	14 May 2023	(Sweden) Jens Dantorp	Soudal Open	(Sweden) Simon Forsström	−17 (64-67-67-69=267)	−16 (65-69-67-67=268)
3	16 Jul	(England) Nathan Kimsey	Barbasol Championship	(Sweden) Vincent Norrman	−22 (66-67-67-66=266)	−22 (69-66-67-64=266)

== See also ==
- 2022 European Tour Qualifying School graduates
