= Wilco Nienaber =

South African professional golfer

Personal information
- Nationality: South Africa
- Born: 7 April 2000 (age 26) South Africa

Career
- Sport: Golf
- Turned professional: 2019
- Current tours: Sunshine Tour; Challenge Tour
- Former tour: European Tour
- Professional wins: 2

Number of wins by tour
- Sunshine Tour: 2
- Challenge Tour: 2

Best results in major championships
- Masters Tournament: DNP
- PGA Championship: DNP
- U.S. Open: T68: 2021
- The Open Championship: DNP

Wilco Nienaber (born 7 April 2000) is a South African professional golfer. He has played on the Sunshine Tour, the Challenge Tour and the European Tour. He is known for his long distance off the tee.

== Amateur career ==
Nienaber won several amateur events in Africa and represented South Africa at the 2018 Eisenhower Trophy in Ireland, where he finished 3 under par individually. He made his European Tour debut as an amateur in December 2018 at the South African Open at Randpark Golf Club, north of Johannesburg, where he opened with two rounds of 69 to make the cut.

His best ranking on the World Amateur Golf Ranking was 28th.

== Professional career ==
Nienaber turned professional in the middle of 2019. His European Tour debut as a professional was made in late November 2019 at the Alfred Dunhill Championship at Leopard Creek CC, Malelane, South Africa, where he finished tied 24th, earning €14,000.

In February 2020, also in his homeland of South Africa, he came close to his first professional win, finishing runner-up in the Limpopo Championship on the Challenge Tour.

In August 2020, Nienaber recorded his first top-10 on the European Tour; finishing 4th in the Hero Open at Forest of Arden CC, England.

In September 2020, 14 months after turning professional, Nienaber advanced to 270th on the Official World Golf Ranking. In the second round of the Joburg Open in November 2020 at Randpark Golf Club in Johannesburg, South Africa, Nienaber hit his drive on the 597-yard, par-5 4th hole a European Tour season record 439 yards. It was also 16 yards longer than the PGA Tour season record at the time. He eventually finished in second place; two shots behind Joachim B. Hansen, and reached a career best 209th on the Official World Golf Ranking.

In May 2021, Nienaber claimed his first professional victory at the Dimension Data Pro-Am. He beat Henric Sturehed in a playoff and advanced to 135th on the Official World Golf Ranking.

In February 2025, Nienaber won the NTT Data Pro-Am for the second time in his career. He shot a total of 262 (27 under par) to beat Jean-Paul Strydom by seven shots.

== Amateur wins ==
- 2017 Northern Cape Amateur Open, Central Gauteng Open Stroke Play
- 2018 Free State Open, Western Province Amateur Strokeplay
- 2019 Gauteng North Open, South African Amateur Championship

== Professional wins (2) ==
=== Sunshine Tour wins (2) ===
No.	Date	Tournament	Winning score	Margin of victory	Runner-up
1	9 May 2021	Dimension Data Pro-Am^{1}	−19 (69-64-71-65=269)	Playoff	(Sweden) Henric Sturehed
2	16 Feb 2025	NTT Data Pro-Am^{1} (2)	−27 (60-66-66-70=262)	7 strokes	(South Africa) Jean-Paul Strydom

^{1}Co-sanctioned by the Challenge Tour

Sunshine Tour playoff record (1–0)

No.	Year	Tournament	Opponent	Result
1	2021	Dimension Data Pro-Am	(Sweden) Henric Sturehed	Won with par on third extra hole

=== Challenge Tour wins (2) ===
No.	Date	Tournament	Winning score	Margin of victory	Runner-up
1	9 May 2021	Dimension Data Pro-Am^{1}	−19 (69-64-71-65=269)	Playoff	(Sweden) Henric Sturehed
2	16 Feb 2025	NTT Data Pro-Am^{1} (2)	−27 (60-66-66-70=262)	7 strokes	(South Africa) Jean-Paul Strydom

^{1}Co-sanctioned by the Sunshine Tour

Challenge Tour playoff record (1–0)

No.	Year	Tournament	Opponent	Result
1	2021	Dimension Data Pro-Am	(Sweden) Henric Sturehed	Won with par on third extra hole

== Results in major championships ==
Tournament	2021	2022	2023
Masters Tournament			
PGA Championship			
U.S. Open	T68		CUT
The Open Championship			

Did not play

"T" = tied

== Results in World Golf Championships ==
Tournament	2021
Championship	
Match Play	
Invitational	64
Champions	NT^{1}

^{1}Cancelled due to COVID-19 pandemic

Did not play

NT = No tournament

== Team appearances ==
Amateur

- Eisenhower Trophy (representing South Africa): 2018

== See also ==
- 2024 European Tour Qualifying School graduates
