= Clément Sordet =

French golfer

Personal information
- Nationality: France
- Born: 22 October 1992 (age 34) Charbonnières-les-Bains, France
- Height: 6 ft 2 in (1.88 m)

Career
- Sport: Golf
- College: Texas Tech
- Turned professional: 2015
- Current tour: European Tour
- Former tours: Sunshine Tour; Challenge Tour; Alps Tour
- Professional wins: 6

Number of wins by tour
- Sunshine Tour: 1
- Challenge Tour: 5 (Tied-8th all-time)
- Other: 1

Best results in major championships
- Masters Tournament: DNP
- PGA Championship: DNP
- U.S. Open: T72: 2019
- The Open Championship: CUT: 2016

Clément Sordet (born 22 October 1992) is a French professional golfer.

== Career ==
Sordet played college golf at Texas Tech where he won six times. After graduating in 2015 and playing in the Palmer Cup, Sordet turned professional. He began playing on the Challenge Tour. In August 2015, he won his first tournament as a professional, at the Northern Ireland Open, playing on a national invitation. It was only his fourth event as a professional. Sordet finished 2015 by finishing joint runner-up in the Thailand Golf Championship. This was one of the Open Qualifying Series and gained him entry to the 2016 Open Championship.

Sordet won his second professional tournament on the Challenge Tour in 2016 at the Turkish Airlines Challenge. Then in 2017, he won both the Viking Challenge and NBO Golf Classic Grand Final and finished second on the 2017 Challenge Tour Order of Merit, which earned him full-time status on the European Tour for 2018.

== Amateur wins ==
- 2011 The Carmel Cup, UTSA/Oak Hills Invitational (tied)
- 2013 Black Horse Match
- 2014 Middleburg Bank Intercollegiate
- 2015 Wyoming Desert Intercollegiate, NCAA Lubbock Regional (tie with Blair Hamilton)

== Professional wins (6) ==
=== Sunshine Tour wins (1) ===
No.	Date	Tournament	Winning score	Margin of victory	Runner-up
1	27 Mar 2022	SDC Open^{1}	−21 (64-66-70-67=267)	Playoff	(South Africa) Ruan Conradie

^{1}Co-sanctioned by the Challenge Tour

Sunshine Tour playoff record (1–0)

No.	Year	Tournament	Opponent	Result
1	2022	SDC Open	(South Africa) Ruan Conradie	Won with birdie on first extra hole

=== Challenge Tour wins (5) ===
Legend
Grand Finals (1)
Other Challenge Tour (4)

No.	Date	Tournament	Winning score	Margin of victory	Runner(s)-up
1	9 Aug 2015	Northern Ireland Open	−17 (67-66-68-66=267)	1 stroke	(United States) John Hahn
2	8 May 2016	Turkish Airlines Challenge	−20 (66-68-65-69=268)	1 stroke	(France) Matthieu Pavon
3	20 Aug 2017	Viking Challenge	−13 (70-66-67=203) (Note: Shortened to 54 holes due to weather.)	5 strokes	(Scotland) Jack Doherty, (England) Charlie Ford, (Netherlands) Daan Huizing
4	4 Nov 2017	NBO Golf Classic Grand Final	−15 (68-67-68-70=273)	2 strokes	(Sweden) Marcus Kinhult
5	27 Mar 2022	SDC Open^{1}	−21 (64-66-70-67=267)	Playoff	(South Africa) Ruan Conradie

^{1}Co-sanctioned by the Sunshine Tour

Challenge Tour playoff record (1–0)

No.	Year	Tournament	Opponent	Result
1	2022	SDC Open	(South Africa) Ruan Conradie	Won with birdie on first extra hole

=== Alps Tour wins (1) ===
No.	Date	Tournament	Winning score	Margin of victory	Runner-up
1	26 Jun 2011	Allianz Open de la Mirabelle d'Or (as an amateur)	−15 (66-72-65-66=269)	Playoff	(France) Émilien Chamaulte

== Results in major championships ==
Tournament	2016	2017	2018
Masters Tournament			
U.S. Open			
The Open Championship	CUT		
PGA Championship			

Tournament	2019
Masters Tournament	
PGA Championship	
U.S. Open	T72
The Open Championship	

Did not play

CUT = missed the half-way cut
"T" = tied for place

== Team appearances ==
Amateur

- European Boys' Team Championship (representing France): 2009, 2010
- European Amateur Team Championship (representing France): 2013, 2014
- Eisenhower Trophy (representing France): 2014
- Palmer Cup (represent Europe): 2015

== See also ==
- 2017 Challenge Tour graduates
- 2018 European Tour Qualifying School graduates
- 2022 Challenge Tour graduates
- 2024 European Tour Qualifying School graduates
- List of golfers with most Challenge Tour wins
