= 2024–25 Sunshine Tour =

Golf tour season

2024–25 Sunshine Tour season
- Duration: 2 May 2024 – 30 March 2025
- Number of official events: 30 (Note: A further two tournaments were scheduled but were postponed.)
- Most wins: (South Africa) Daniel van Tonder (4)
- Order of Merit: (South Africa) Daniel van Tonder
- Rookie of the Year: (South Africa) Altin van der Merwe

The 2024–25 Sunshine Tour was the 54th season of the Sunshine Tour (formerly the Southern Africa Tour), the main professional golf tour in South Africa since it was formed in 1971.

== Schedule ==
The following table lists official events during the 2024–25 season.

Date	Tournament	Location	Purse (R)	Winner (Note: The number in brackets after each winner's name is the number of Sunshine Tour events they had won up to and including that tournament. This information is only shown for Sunshine Tour members.)	OWGR points	Other tours (Note: CHA − Challenge Tour; EUR − European Tour.)	Notes
5 May	Waterfall City Tournament of Champions	Gauteng	2,500,000	(South Africa) Louis Albertse (3)	n/a		Limited-field mixed event (Note: Also a new tournament.)
12 May	FBC Zim Open	Zimbabwe	2,500,000	(South Africa) Michael Hollick (2)	2.44		
26 May	Kit Kat Cash & Carry Pro-Am	Gauteng	2,000,000	(Zimbabwe) Kieran Vincent (1)	2.01		Pro-Am
7 Jun	SunBet Challenge (Sun City)	North West	2,000,000	(South Africa) Jacques Blaauw (5)	2.40		
16 Jun	Mopani Zambia Open	Zambia	2,500,000	(South Africa) M. J. Viljoen (3)	0.94		
26 Jul	SunBet Challenge (Wild Coast)	Western Cape	2,000,000	(South Africa) Jaco Ahlers (12)	2.11		
3 Aug	FNB Eswatini Challenge	Eswatini	2,000,000	(South Africa) Daniel van Tonder (9)	1.86		
18 Aug	Vodacom Origins of Golf at Highland Gate	Mpumalanga	2,000,000	(South Africa) Jean Hugo (20)	2.20		
23 Aug	SunBet Challenge (Time Square Casino)	Gauteng	2,000,000	(South Africa) Thriston Lawrence (4)	2.72		
30 Aug	Gary & Vivienne Player Challenge	Gauteng	2,000,000	(South Africa) Daniel van Tonder (10)	2.13		
15 Sep	Bain's Whisky Ubunye Championship	Gauteng	2,000,000	(South Africa) Jean Hugo (21) and (South Africa) Ruan Korb (3)	n/a		Team event
22 Sep	Vodacom Origins of Golf at Sishen	Northern Cape	2,000,000	(South Africa) Yurav Premlall (1)	2.04		
4 Oct	SunBet Challenge (Sun Sibaya)	KwaZulu-Natal	2,000,000	(South Africa) Luke Jerling (1)	1.83		
13 Oct	Vodacom Origins of Golf at Wild Coast Sun	Western Cape	2,000,000	(South Africa) Jonathan Broomhead (2)	1.69		
20 Oct	Fortress Invitational	Gauteng	2,000,000	(South Africa) Robin Williams (2)	2.43		
~~27 Oct~~	Zambia Masters	Zambia	–	Postponed	–		
2 Nov	Blue Label Challenge	North West	2,500,000	(South Africa) Jonathan Broomhead (3)	2.80		
17 Nov	Vodacom Origins of Golf Final	Western Cape	2,000,000	(South Africa) Dean Burmester (11)	3.54		
24 Nov	PGA Championship	Eastern Cape	2,000,000	(South Africa) Pieter Moolman (3)	2.71		
8 Dec	Nedbank Golf Challenge	North West	US$6,000,000	(United States) Johannes Veerman (n/a)	20.90	EUR	Limited-field event
15 Dec	Alfred Dunhill Championship	Mpumalanga	€1,500,000	(South Africa) Shaun Norris (4)	17.78	EUR	
22 Dec	AfrAsia Bank Mauritius Open	Mauritius	US$1,500,000	(England) John Parry (n/a)	10.95	EUR	
19 Jan	Mediclinic Invitational	Free State	2,000,000	(Austria) Maximilian Steinlechner (1)	3.57		
26 Jan	SDC Open	Limpopo	US$375,000	(South Africa) Daniel van Tonder (11)	8.41	CHA	
2 Feb	MyGolfLife Open	North West	US$375,000	(South Africa) Daniel van Tonder (12)	8.94	CHA	
9 Feb	Cell C Cape Town Open	Western Cape	US$375,000	(England) Jamie Rutherford (n/a)	8.76	CHA	
16 Feb	NTT Data Pro-Am	Western Cape	7,000,000	(South Africa) Wilco Nienaber (2)	9.54	CHA	Pro-Am
~~23 Feb~~	Hyundai Open	Gauteng	–	Postponed	–		New tournament
2 Mar	Investec South African Open Championship	KwaZulu-Natal	US$1,500,000	(South Africa) Dylan Naidoo (2)	15.59	EUR	
9 Mar	Joburg Open	Gauteng	20,500,000	(Scotland) Calum Hill (n/a)	15.02	EUR	
23 Mar	Serengeti Playoffs	Gauteng	2,500,000	(South Africa) George Coetzee (15)	3.99		Playoff event
30 Mar	DNi Tour Championship	Gauteng	3,000,000	(South Africa) Michael Hollick (3)	3.13		Playoff event

== Order of Merit ==
The Order of Merit was titled as the Order of Merit delivered by The Courier Guy and was based on tournament results during the season, calculated using a points-based system. The top three players on the Order of Merit (not otherwise exempt) earned status to play on the 2026 European Tour (DP World Tour).

Position	Player	Points	Status earned
1	(South Africa) Daniel van Tonder	4,155	Already exempt (Note: Van Tonder was already exempt due to finishing inside the Top 20 of the 2025 Challenge Tour Rankings.)
2	(South Africa) Shaun Norris	3,574	Already exempt (Note: Norris, Naidoo and Kruyswijk were already exempt due to being tournament winners on the 2025 European Tour (DP World Tour).)
3	(South Africa) Dylan Naidoo	3,545	Already exempt
4	(South Africa) Jonathan Broomhead	1,956	Promoted to European Tour
5	(South Africa) Jacques Kruyswijk	1,937	Already exempt
6	(South Africa) Yurav Premlall	1,915	Promoted to European Tour
7	(South Africa) Michael Hollick	1,678	Promoted to European Tour

== Awards ==
Award	Winner	Ref.
Rookie of the Year (Bobby Locke Trophy)	(South Africa) Altin van der Merwe	

== See also ==
- 2024–25 Big Easy Tour
