= 2026–27 PGA Tour of Australasia =

Golf tour season

2026–27 PGA Tour of Australasia season
- Duration: 27 August 2026 – 21 March 2027
- Number of official events: 18

The 2026–27 PGA Tour of Australasia, titled as the 2026–27 Challenger PGA Tour of Australasia for sponsorship reasons, will be the 53rd season on the PGA Tour of Australasia, the main professional golf tour in Australia and New Zealand since it was formed in 1973.

== Schedule ==
The following table lists official events during the 2026–27 season.

Date	Tournament	Location	Purse (A$)	Winner (Note: The number in brackets after each winner's name is the number of PGA Tour of Australasia events they had won up to and including that tournament. This information is only shown for PGA Tour of Australasia members.)	OWGR points	Other tours (Note: ASA − Asian Tour; EUR − European Tour; JPN − Japan Golf Tour; WANZ − WPGA Tour of Australasia.)	Notes
30 Aug	PNG Open	Papua New Guinea	225,000	(Australia) Josh Armstrong (1)	1.82		
11 Oct	CKB WA PGA Championship	Western Australia	250,000	(Australia) Justin Warren (1)	3.04		
18 Oct	WA Open	Western Australia	200,000	(Australia) James Marchesani (1)	3.09		
25 Oct	Players Series SA	South Australia	200,000	(Australia) Adam Bland (1)	1.99	WANZ	Mixed event
15 Nov	Ford NSW Open	New South Wales	800,000	(Australia) Ben Eccles (3)	3.93		
22 Nov	Queensland PGA Championship	Queensland	250,000	(Australia) Declan O'Donovan (2)	3.63		
29 Nov	BMW Australian PGA Championship	New South Wales	2,500,000			EUR	
6 Dec	Capital.com Australian Open	Victoria	2,500,000			EUR	
13 Dec	Victorian PGA Championship	Victoria	250,000				
10 Jan	Players Series Perth	Western Australia	250,000			WANZ	Mixed event
17 Jan	Players Series Victoria	Victoria	250,000			WANZ	Mixed event
24 Jan	Vic Open	Victoria	250,000				
31 Jan	Players Series Murray River	New South Wales	250,000			WANZ	Mixed event
7 Feb	Players Series Sydney	New South Wales	250,000			WANZ	Mixed event
14 Feb	Quinovic New Zealand PGA Championship	New Zealand					
21 Feb	ISPS Handa-Japan Australasia Championship	New Zealand				JPN	
28 Feb	New Zealand Open	New Zealand	NZ$2,300,000			ASA	
21 Mar	The National Tournament	Victoria					

=== Unofficial events ===
The following events were sanctioned by the PGA Tour of Australasia, but did not carry official money, nor were wins official.

Date	Tournament	Location	Purse (A$)	Winner	OWGR points	Other tours	Notes
27 Sep	World Sand Greens Championship	New South Wales	125,000	(Australia) Scott Barr	n/a		
