= 2015 Big Easy Tour =

Golf tour season

2015 Big Easy Tour season
- Duration: 11 May 2015 – 16 September 2015
- Number of official events: 8
- Most wins: (South Africa) Christiaan Bezuidenhout (2)
- Order of Merit: (South Africa) Christiaan Bezuidenhout

The 2015 Big Easy Tour was the fifth season of the Big Easy Tour, the official development tour to the Sunshine Tour.

== Schedule ==
The following table lists official events during the 2015 season.

Date	Tournament	Location	Purse (R)	Winner (Note: The number in brackets after each winner's name is the number of Big Easy Tour events they had won up to and including that tournament. It is rare for someone to accumulate many wins on the Big Easy Tour as success at this level usually leads to promotion to the Sunshine Tour.)
12 May	Kempton Park	Gauteng	100,000	(South Africa) Gert Myburgh (1)
27 May	Huddle Park	Gauteng	100,000	(Portugal) Stephen Ferreira (1)
9 Jun	Royal J & K	Gauteng	100,000	(South Africa) Bryn Flanagan (1)
7 Jul	Houghton GC	Gauteng	100,000	(South Africa) Kevin Rundle (1)
18 Aug	Irene CC	Gauteng	100,000	(South Africa) Pieter Kruger (1)
4 Sep	King's Cup	Gauteng	100,000	(South Africa) Christiaan Bezuidenhout (1)
9 Sep	Glendower GC	Gauteng	100,000	(South Africa) Christiaan Bezuidenhout (2)
16 Sep	Big Easy Tour Championship	Gauteng	200,000	(South Africa) Daniel Hammond (1)

== Order of Merit ==
The Order of Merit was based on prize money won during the season, calculated in South African rand. The top five players on the Order of Merit earned status to play on the 2016–17 Sunshine Tour.

Position	Player	Prize money (R)
1	(South Africa) Christiaan Bezuidenhout	70,465
2	(South Africa) Daniel Hammond	53,197
3	(South Africa) Gideon Pienaar	49,470
4	(South Africa) Michael Palmer	47,747
5	(South Africa) Bryn Flanagan	40,067
