= 2022 Big Easy Tour =

Golf tour season

2022 Big Easy Tour season
- Duration: 10 May 2022 – 17 November 2022
- Number of official events: 10
- Most wins: (South Africa) Gerhard Pepler (3)
- Order of Merit: (South Africa) Gerhard Pepler

The 2022 Big Easy Tour, titled as the 2022 Altron Big Easy Tour for sponsorship reasons, was the 11th season of the Big Easy Tour, the official development tour to the Sunshine Tour.

== Altron title sponsorship ==
In April, it was announced that the tour had signed a title sponsorship agreement with South African technology company Altron, being renamed as the Altron Big Easy Tour.

== Schedule ==
The following table lists official events during the 2022 season.

Date	Tournament	Location	Purse (R)	Winner (Note: The number in brackets after each winner's name is the number of Big Easy Tour events they had won up to and including that tournament. It is rare for someone to accumulate many wins on the Big Easy Tour as success at this level usually leads to promotion to the Sunshine Tour.)	OWGR points
12 May	Altron Big Easy Tour 1	Gauteng	150,000	(South Africa) Christiaan Maas (a) (1)	3
8 Jun	Altron Big Easy Tour 2	Gauteng	150,000	(South Korea) Kim Dong-kwan (1)	3
15 Jun	Altron Big Easy Tour 3	Gauteng	150,000	(South Africa) Gregory McKay (1)	3
23 Jun	Altron Big Easy Tour 4	Gauteng	150,000	(South Africa) Adam Breen (1)	3
30 Jun	Altron Big Easy Tour 5	Gauteng	150,000	(South Africa) Ricky Hendler (1)	3
6 Jul	Altron Big Easy Tour 6	Gauteng	150,000	(South Africa) Casey Jarvis (a) (1)	3
14 Jul	Altron Big Easy Tour 7	Gauteng	150,000	(South Africa) Gerhard Pepler (2)	3
1 Sep	Altron Big Easy Tour 8	Gauteng	150,000	(South Africa) Ruan de Smidt (2)	0.34
6 Oct	Altron Big Easy Tour Play Off	Gauteng	150,000	(South Africa) Gerhard Pepler (3)	0.22
17 Nov	Altron Big Easy Tour Final	Gauteng	150,000	(South Africa) Gerhard Pepler (4)	0.17

== Order of Merit ==
The Order of Merit was based on prize money won during the season, calculated in South African rand. The top 12 players on the Order of Merit earned status to play on the 2023–24 Sunshine Tour.

Position	Player	Prize money (R)
1	(South Africa) Gerhard Pepler	133,940
2	(South Africa) Ricky Hendler	99,568
3	(South Africa) Ruan de Smidt	68,713
4	(South Korea) Kim Dong-kwan	55,928
5	(South Africa) Reinhardt Blaauw	54,873
6	(South Africa) Keelan van Wyk	53,190
7	(South Africa) Gregory McKay	48,838
8	(South Africa) Nicholaus Frade	48,793
9	(South Africa) L. B. Boshoff	46,413
10	(South Africa) Leon Visser	45,295
11	(South Africa) Adam Breen	43,960
12	(South Africa) Jonathan Waschefort	43,364
