= MyGolfLife Open =

Golf tournament in Hartbeespoort, South Africa

Coordinates: 25.771°S 27.854°E

Tournament information
- Location: Hartbeespoort, South Africa
- Established: 2022
- Courses: Pecanwood Golf and Country Club
- Par: 72
- Length: 7,697 yards (7,038 m)
- Tours: European Tour; Sunshine Tour; Challenge Tour
- Format: Stroke play
- Prize fund: US$375,000
- Month played: January/February

Tournament record score
- Aggregate: 261 Daniel van Tonder (2025)
- To par: −27 as above

Current champion
- (South Africa) Daniel van Tonder

Location map
- Location in South Africa Location in the North West

The MyGolfLife Open is a professional golf tournament that was created in 2022 and was held at Pecanwood Golf and Country Club, in Hartbeespoort, South Africa.

The tournament was introduced for the 2022 season as a co-sanctioned European Tour and Sunshine Tour event. Originally titled as the Pecanwood Classic, the name was eventually changed to the MyGolfLife Open.

Pablo Larrazábal won the inaugural event, beating Adri Arnaus and Jordan Smith in a sudden-death playoff.

The tournament was not played in 2023 or 2024, but returned in 2025 as a co-sanctioned Challenge Tour and Sunshine Tour event.

== Winners ==
| Year | Tours (Note: AFR − Sunshine Tour; CHA − Challenge Tour; EUR − European Tour.) | Winner | Score | To par | Margin of victory | Runner(s)-up |
|---|---|---|---|---|---|---|
| 2025 | AFR, CHA | (South Africa) Daniel van Tonder | 261 | −27 | 2 strokes | (South Africa) Martin Vorster |
2023–24: No tournament
| 2022 | AFR, EUR | (Spain) Pablo Larrazábal | 266 | −22 | Playoff (Note: Larrazábal won with a birdie on the second hole of a sudden-death playoff; Arnaus was eliminated from the playoff when he failed to make birdie on the first extra hole.) | (Spain) Adri Arnaus (England) Jordan Smith |
