= 2026–27 Big Easy Tour =

Golf tour season

2026–27 Big Easy Tour season
- Duration: 21 April 2026 – TBD
- Number of official events: TBD

The 2026–27 Big Easy Tour, titled as the 2026–27 Betway Big Easy Tour for sponsorship reasons, is the 15th season of the Big Easy Tour, the official development tour to the Sunshine Tour.

== Schedule ==
The following table lists official events during the 2026–27 season.

Date	Tournament	Location	Purse (R)	Winner (Note: The number in brackets after each winner's name is the number of Big Easy Tour events they had won up to and including that tournament. It is rare for someone to accumulate many wins on the Big Easy Tour as success at this level usually leads to promotion to the Sunshine Tour.)	OWGR points
23 Apr	Betway Big Easy Blue Label Invitational 1	Gauteng	150,000	(South Africa) Simon du Plooy (1)	0.48
30 Apr	Betway Big Easy Blue Label Invitational 2	Gauteng	150,000	(South Africa) Ruan de Smidt (3)	0.36
15 May	Betway Big Easy Tour 1	Gauteng	150,000	(South Africa) Jordan Wessels (1)	0.24
28 May	Betway Big Easy Tour 2	Gauteng	150,000	(South Africa) Ruben van der Berg (1)	0.42
4 Jun	Betway Big Easy Tour 3	Gauteng	150,000	(Republic of Ireland) Liam Grehan (1)	0.53
26 Jun	Betway Big Easy Tour 4	Gauteng	150,000	(South Africa) Jacques van der Merwe (4)	0.32
3 Jul	Betway Big Easy Tour 5	Gauteng	150,000	(England) Daniel Smith (1)	0.35
9 Jul	Betway Big Easy Blue Label Invitational 3	Gauteng	150,000	(South Africa) Werner Deyzel (1)	n/a
23 Jul	Betway Big Easy Tour 6	Gauteng	150,000	(South Africa) Louis Liebenberg (1)	0.50
6 Aug	Betway Big Easy Tour 7	Gauteng	150,000	(South Africa) Wandre Snyman (1)	0.28
20 Aug	Betway Big Easy Blue Label Invitational 4	Gauteng	150,000	(Chile) Martín León (1)	0.37
27 Aug	Betway Big Easy Blue Label Invitational 5	Gauteng	150,000	(South Africa) Luke Truter (a) (1)	0.30
5 Sep	Kings Cup	Eswatini	700,000	(South Africa) Leon Visser (1)	0.33
23 Sep	Betway Big Easy Tour 8	Gauteng	150,000	(England) Corey Sheppard (1)	0.27
15 Oct	Betway Big Easy Blue Label Invitational 7	Gauteng	150,000	(South Africa) Hannes Strooh (1)	0.40
22 Oct	Betway Big Easy Blue Label Invitational 8	Gauteng	150,000	(England) Corey Sheppard (2)	0.35
29 Oct	Betway Big Easy Tour 9	Gauteng	150,000	(South Africa) Wandre Snyman (2)	0.39
12 Nov	Betway Big Easy Tour 10	Gauteng	150,000	(England) Joe Knox (2)	0.26
19 Nov	Betway Big Easy Blue Label Invitational 9	Gauteng	150,000	(England) Daniel Smith (2)	
26 Nov	Betway Big Easy Blue Label Invitational 10	Gauteng	150,000		
16 Dec; ~~30 Sep~~	Betway Big Easy Blue Label Invitational 6	Gauteng	150,000		

== Sunshine Development Tour ==
2026–27 Sunshine Development Tour season
- Duration: 19 April 2026 – TBD
- Number of official events: TBD

The 2026–27 Sunshine Development Tour is the second season of the Sunshine Development Tour, a development tour to the Sunshine Tour, alongside the Big Easy Tour.

=== Schedule ===
The following table lists official events during the 2026–27 season.

Date	Tournament	Host country	Purse (KSh)	Winner (Note: The number in brackets after each winner's name is the number of Sunshine Development Tour events they had won up to and including that tournament.)	OWGR points
21 Apr	SunDev EA 1 Thika Sports Club	Kenya	2,000,000	(Rwanda) Celestin Nsanzuwera (3)	0.13
9 Jun	SDT-EAS 2 NCBA Royal Classic	Kenya	2,000,000	(Kenya) Daniel Nduva (1)	0.19
16 Jun	SDT-EAS 3 Kabete Challenge	Kenya	2,000,000	(Kenya) Dismas Indiza (2)	0.14
9 Jul	SDT-EAS 4 ABSA Invitational	Kenya	2,000,000	(Kenya) Samuel Njoroge Chege (1)	0.17
18 Aug	SDT-EAS 5 ABSA Invitational	Kenya	2,000,000	(Rwanda) Celestin Nsanzuwera (4)	0.13
19 Sep	SDT-EAS 7 Pearl of Africa	Uganda	US$20,000	(Uganda) Ronald Rugumayo (1)	0.26
4 Oct	SDT-EAS 8 Lakowe Lakes Classic	Nigeria	US$50,000	(Ghana) Vincent Torgah (1)	0.29
27 Oct	SDT-EAS 9 Rift Valley Championship	Kenya	2,000,000	(Nigeria) Godwin Okoko (1)	0.10
20 Nov	SDT-EAS 11 Alpha Bravo Golf Classic	Nigeria	US$25,000	(Nigeria) Godwin Okoko (2)	
8 Dec	SDT-EAS 12 Sigona Classic	TBC	2,000,000		
19 Jan	SDT-EAS 13 Limuru Challenge	Kenya	2,000,000		
