= 2027 PGA Tour =

Golf tour season

2027 PGA Tour season
- Duration: January 21, 2027 – November 21, 2027
- Number of official events: TBA

The 2027 PGA Tour will be the 112th season of the PGA Tour, the main professional golf tour in the United States. It will also be the 59th season since separating from the PGA of America, and the 21st and final edition of the FedEx Cup as well.

== Schedule ==
The following table lists official events during the 2027 season.

Date	Tournament	Location	Purse (US$)	Winner(s) (Note: The number in parentheses after each winner's name is the number of PGA Tour events they had won up to and including that tournament. This information is only shown for PGA Tour members.)	OWGR points	Other tours (Note: EUR − European Tour; JPN − Japan Golf Tour.)	Notes
Jan 24	The American Express	California					
Jan 30	The Sentry	California					
Feb 7	AT&T Pebble Beach Pro-Am	California					Signature event
Feb 14	WM Phoenix Open	Arizona					
Feb 21	Genesis Invitational	California					Signature event
Feb 21	TBD						Additional event
Feb 28	Cognizant Classic	Florida					
Mar 7	Cadillac Championship	Florida					Signature event
Mar 14	The Players Championship	Florida			80		Flagship event
Mar 21	Arnold Palmer Invitational	Florida					Signature event
Mar 28	Texas Children's Houston Open	Texas					
Apr 4	Valero Texas Open	Texas					
Apr 11	Masters Tournament	Georgia			100		Major championship
Apr 18	RBC Heritage	South Carolina					Signature event
Apr 25	Zurich Classic of New Orleans	Louisiana			n/a		Team event
May 2	CJ Cup Byron Nelson	Texas					
May 9	Valspar Championship	Florida					
May 16	Truist Championship	North Carolina					Signature event
May 16	Oneflight Myrtle Beach Classic	South Carolina					Additional event
May 23	PGA Championship	Texas			100		Major championship
May 30	Charles Schwab Challenge	Texas					Invitational
Jun 6	Memorial Tournament	Ohio					Signature event
Jun 13	RBC Canadian Open	Canada					
Jun 20	U.S. Open	California			100		Major championship
Jun 27	Travelers Championship	Connecticut					Signature event
Jul 4	John Deere Classic	Illinois					
Jul 11	Genesis Scottish Open	Scotland				EUR	
Jul 11	ISCO Championship	Kentucky				EUR	Additional event
Jul 18	The Open Championship	Scotland			100		Major championship
Jul 18	Corales Puntacana Championship	Dominican Republic				EUR	Additional event
Jul 25	3M Open	Minnesota					
Aug 1	Sompo Championship	California					
Aug 8	GO by Raymond James	North Carolina					
Aug 15	FedEx St. Jude Championship	Tennessee					FedEx Cup playoff event
Aug 22	BMW Championship	New Jersey					FedEx Cup playoff event
Aug 29	Tour Championship	Georgia					FedEx Cup playoff event
