= U.S. Open =

U.S. Open or US Open are open championship sporting tournaments that are hosted in the United States and in which anyone, especially amateur and professional, or American and non-American, may compete. The term may also be applied to non-sporting events, such as competitive gaming.

The term most commonly refers to:

- U.S. Open (golf)
- US Open (tennis)

Other uses include (in alphabetical order by sport/game):

- U.S. Open Badminton Championships
- U.S. Open Beer Championship
- U.S. Open (bowling)
- U.S. Open Chess Championship
- U.S. Open (crosswords)
- US Open (court tennis), also known as real tennis
- US Open of Curling
- U.S. Open (cycling)
- US Open (darts)
- U.S. Open (go), boardgame tournament
- U.S. Women's Open, golf tournament
- U.S. Open Pickleball Championships
- US Open Polo Championship
- U.S. Open pool championships including:
  - U.S. Open Straight Pool Championship
  - U.S. Open Nine-ball Championship
  - U.S. Open Ten-ball Championship
- US Open Racquetball Championships
- U.S. Open Cup, soccer tournament held between American soccer clubs from Major League Soccer, minor leagues, and amateur associations
- U.S. Open (squash)
- U.S. Open (swimming)
- U.S. Open of Surfing
- U.S. Open (table tennis)
- U.S. Open Track and Field
