= Ryan van Velzen =

South African professional golfer

Personal information
- Nationality: South Africa
- Born: 4 October 2001 (age 25)

Career
- Sport: Golf
- Turned professional: 2021
- Current tours: European Tour; Challenge Tour; Sunshine Tour
- Professional wins: 5

Number of wins by tour
- Sunshine Tour: 2
- Challenge Tour: 1
- Other: 2

Best results in major championships
- Masters Tournament: DNP
- PGA Championship: CUT: 2024
- U.S. Open: DNP
- The Open Championship: CUT: 2024

Achievements and awards
- Sunshine Tour Order of Merit winner: 2023–24

Ryan van Velzen (born 4 October 2001) is a South African professional golfer who plays on the European Tour and the Sunshine Tour. He won the 2023–24 Sunshine Tour Order of Merit. He also finished runner-up at the 2023 Investec South African Open Championship and the 2024 Alfred Dunhill Championship.

== Professional career ==
Van Velzen won two tournaments on the 2020–21 Big Easy Tour as an amateur, before turning professional in April 2021. He joined the Sunshine Tour and recorded a best finish in his rookie season with a tie for 4th at the Kit Kat Group Pro-Am. On the 2022–23 Sunshine Tour, he secured his maiden title at the Limpopo Championship, the penultimate regular event of the season.

On the 2023–24 Sunshine Tour, he was runner-up at the Investec South African Open Championship, three shots behind winner Dean Burmester. He also won the Mediclinic Invitational and lost in a playoff to Mikael Lindberg at the Bain's Whisky Cape Town Open. He secured the top spot in the Order of Merit and was promoted to the 2025 European Tour. It also earned him starts at the 2024 PGA Championship (his first major appearance) and the 2024 Open Championship at Royal Troon.

In his fourth start on the 2025 European Tour, he finished runner-up at the Alfred Dunhill Championship in December 2024, one shot behind Shaun Norris.

== Professional wins (5) ==
=== Sunshine Tour wins (2) ===
No.	Date	Tournament	Winning score	Margin of victory	Runner(s)-up
1	2 Apr 2023	Limpopo Championship	−12 (69-67-68=204) (Note: Shortened to 54 holes due to weather.)	1 stroke	(South Africa) Luca Filippi, (South Africa) Jaco Prinsloo, (South Africa) Daniel van Tonder
2	28 Jan 2024	Mediclinic Invitational	−25 (66-69-64-64=263)	4 strokes	(South Africa) Neil Schietekat

Sunshine Tour playoff record (0–1)

No.	Year	Tournament	Opponent	Result
1	2024	Bain's Whisky Cape Town Open	(Sweden) Mikael Lindberg	Lost to birdie on second extra hole

=== Challenge Tour wins (1) ===
No.	Date	Tournament	Winning score	Margin of victory	Runners-up
1	31 May 2026	Challenge de España	−17 (64-71-63-69=267)	2 strokes	(Netherlands) Wil Besseling, (United States) Dan Erickson

=== Big Easy Tour wins (2) ===
No.	Date	Tournament	Winning score	Margin of victory	Runner(s)-up
1	21 Oct 2020	Big Easy Road To #1 (as an amateur)	−16 (65-66-69=200)	2 strokes	(South Africa) Dylan Kok, (South Africa) Vaughn van Deventer, (South Africa) Warwick Purchase
2	25 Mar 2021	Big Easy Road To #8 (as an amateur)	−13 (68-68-67=203)	1 stroke	(South Africa) Matthew Rushton

== Results in major championships ==
Tournament	2024
Masters Tournament	
PGA Championship	CUT
U.S. Open	
The Open Championship	CUT

Did not play

CUT = missed the half-way cut
