= SDC Open =

Professional golf tournament

Coordinates: 24.747°S 27.883°E

Tournament information
- Location: Bela-Bela, Limpopo, South Africa
- Established: 2022
- Courses: Zebula Golf Estate & Spa
- Par: 72
- Length: 7,470 yards (6,830 m)
- Tours: Sunshine Tour; Challenge Tour
- Format: Stroke play
- Prize fund: US$375,000
- Month played: January/February

Tournament record score
- Aggregate: 263 J. J. Senekal (2023)
- To par: −25 as above

Current champion
- (South Africa) M. J. Viljoen

Location map
- Location in South Africa Location in Limpopo

The SDC Open is a professional golf tournament held at Zebula Golf Estate & Spa, near Bela-Bela in Limpopo, South Africa. It is played on the Sunshine Tour and Challenge Tour as a co-sanctioned event.

== History ==
The inaugural tournament in 2022 was won by Clément Sordet of France who birdied the first extra hole to defeat home player Ruan Conradie in a playoff.

In 2023, South African J. J. Senekal shot an opening round 62 to win his maiden Challenge Tour title in wire-to-wire style.

In 2024, it served as the opening tournament on the Challenge Tour season, and marked the first of a four-tournament South African swing.

== Winners ==
Year	Tours (Note: AFR − Sunshine Tour; CHA − Challenge Tour.)	Winner	Score	To par	Margin of victory	Runner(s)-up
2026	AFR, CHA	(South Africa) M. J. Viljoen	272	−16	Playoff	(South Africa) Deon Germishuys
2025	AFR, CHA	(South Africa) Daniel van Tonder	272	−16	Playoff	(South Africa) Altin van der Merwe
2024	AFR, CHA	(Wales) Rhys Enoch	264	−24	2 strokes	(South Africa) Deon Germishuys (South Africa) Martin Rohwer
2023	AFR, CHA	(South Africa) J. J. Senekal	263	−25	4 strokes	(South Africa) Casey Jarvis
2022	AFR, CHA	(France) Clément Sordet	267	−21	Playoff	(South Africa) Ruan Conradie
