= Big Easy Tour =

Professional golf tour

- Current season, competition or edition: 2026–27 Big Easy Tour
- Sport: Golf
- Founded: 2011
- Founder: Sunshine Tour
- First season: 2011
- Countries: Based in South Africa (Note: Schedules have also included events in Eswatini.)
- Most titles: Tournament wins: (South Africa) Ian Snyman (5)
- Website: https://bigeasytour.co.za/

The Big Easy Tour, currently titled as the Betway Big Easy Tour, is a developmental golf tour based in South Africa, founded in 2011. It is a developmental tour for the Sunshine Tour. The top 12 players earn Sunshine Tour cards, with those 11th–30th earning entry into the final stage of Sunshine Tour qualifying school. The tour is named after the nickname of South African golfer Ernie Els.

In 2017, three tournaments were co-sanctioned with the MENA Golf Tour.

From the start of 2018, tournaments attracted Official World Golf Ranking points. Winners initially received a minimum of 3 points for 54-hole tournaments and 5 points for 72-hole tournaments.

== Order of Merit winners ==
Season	Winner	Points
2025–26	(England) Joe Sullivan	1,397
2024–25	(South Africa) Warwick Purchase	888
2023–24	(South Africa) Leon Vorster	729
Season	Winner	Prize money (R)
2022	(South Africa) Gerhard Pepler	133,940
2020–21	(South Africa) Kyle McClatchie	60,547
2019	(South Africa) Malcolm Mitchell	74,097
2018	(South Africa) Dylan Kok	58,789
2017	(South Africa) Jacquin Hess	75,162
2016	(South Africa) Jason Viljoen	75,408
2015	(South Africa) Christiaan Bezuidenhout	70,465
2014	(South Africa) Maritz Wessels	51,593
2013	(South Africa) Divan Gerber	60,694
2012	(South Africa) Teboho Sefatsa	76,170
2011	(South Africa) Louis Calitz	61,022

== Sunshine Development Tour ==
In March 2025, the Sunshine Tour announced the formation of the Sunshine Development Tour, a formation of tournaments to be played in Kenya and East Africa. Tournaments also gained Official World Golf Ranking points.

=== Sunshine Development Tour Order of Merit winners ===
Year	Winner	Points
2025–26	(Kenya) Njoroge Kibugu	1,497
