= Cape Town Open =

Golf tournament on the Sunshine Tour in South Africa

Circa Cape Town Open
Tournament information
- Location: Cape Town, South Africa
- Established: 2012
- Course: Royal Cape Golf Club
- Par: 72
- Length: 6,821 yards (6,237 m)
- Tours: Sunshine Tour; Challenge Tour
- Format: Stroke play
- Prize fund: US$375,000
- Month played: February

Tournament record score
- Aggregate: 269 Rhys Enoch (2018)
- To par: −19 as above

Current champion
- (England) Will Enefer

Final champion
- Location in South Africa Location in Western Cape

The Cape Town Open is a golf tournament on the Sunshine Tour in Cape Town, South Africa.

== History ==
From 2012 to 2016, it was played annually in November at Royal Cape Golf Club. In 2018, it moved to February at the King David Mowbray Golf Club. Rhys Enoch won by one stroke from Peter Karmis. In 2019, the event moved to the Royal Cape Golf Club and was won by Benjamin Follett-Smith.

The 2020 edition was co-sanctioned with the Challenge Tour and had increased prize money of US$250,000 (R3,500,000). Because of the large field, two courses were used for the first two rounds; Royal Cape Golf Club and King David Mowbray Golf Club. Anton Karlsson won by a stroke from Garrick Higgo, with overnight leader Daniel van Tonder fading with a final round 78.

== Winners ==
| Year | Tour(s) (Note: AFR − Sunshine Tour; CHA − Challenge Tour.) | Winner | Score | To par | Margin of victory | Runner(s)-up |
Circa Cape Town Open
| 2026 | AFR, CHA | (England) Will Enefer | 274 | −14 | Playoff | (South Africa) Hennie Otto |
Cell C Cape Town Open
| 2025 | AFR, CHA | (England) Jamie Rutherford | 274 | −14 | 2 strokes | (South Africa) Keenan Davidse |
Bain's Whisky Cape Town Open
| 2024 | AFR, CHA | (Sweden) Mikael Lindberg | 272 | −16 | Playoff | (South Africa) Ryan van Velzen |
| 2023 | AFR, CHA | (Zimbabwe) Benjamin Follett-Smith (2) | 273 | −15 | 1 stroke | (France) Ugo Coussaud (South Africa) Jaco van Zyl |
| 2022 | AFR, CHA | (South Africa) J. C. Ritchie (2) | 270 | −18 | 1 stroke | (Belgium) Christopher Mivis |
| 2021 | AFR, CHA | (South Africa) J. C. Ritchie | 274 | −14 | Playoff | (South Africa) Jacques Blaauw |
RAM Cape Town Open
| 2020 | AFR, CHA | (Sweden) Anton Karlsson | 274 | −14 | 1 stroke | (South Africa) Garrick Higgo |
| 2019 | AFR | (Zimbabwe) Benjamin Follett-Smith | 275 | −13 | 2 strokes | (South Africa) Zander Lombard (South Africa) Jean-Paul Strydom |
Cape Town Open
| 2018 | AFR | (Wales) Rhys Enoch | 269 | −19 | 1 stroke | (South Africa) Peter Karmis |
2017: No tournament due to reschedulling from November to February
Lion of Africa Cape Town Open
| 2016 | AFR | (South Africa) Jacques Kruyswijk | 271 | −17 | 2 strokes | (South Africa) Justin Harding (South Africa) Brandon Stone |
| 2015 | AFR | (South Africa) Brandon Stone | 272 | −16 | 5 strokes | (South Africa) Ockie Strydom (England) Steve Surry |
| 2014 | AFR | (South Africa) Jaco Ahlers | 276 | −12 | Playoff | (England) Ross McGowan (South Africa) Hennie Otto |
| 2013 | AFR | (South Africa) Tjaart van der Walt | 274 | −14 | 6 strokes | (South Africa) Michael Hollick |
| 2012 | AFR | (South Africa) Jake Roos | 279 | −9 | Playoff | (South Africa) Tyrone van Aswegen (South Africa) Jaco van Zyl (South Africa) Mark Williams |
