= British Challenge =

Golf tournament on the Challenge Tour

Tournament information
- Location: St Mellion, Cornwall, England
- Established: 2021
- Course: St Mellion Estate
- Par: 72
- Length: 7,010 yards (6,410 m)
- Tour: Challenge Tour
- Format: Stroke Play
- Prize fund: £230,000
- Month played: August
- Final year: 2023

Tournament record score
- Aggregate: 269 Hugo León (2021)
- To par: −19 as above

Final champion
- (England) Alex Fitzpatrick

Location map
- Location in England Location in Cornwall

The British Challenge was a golf tournament on the Challenge Tour, played in England. It was first held in 2021 at The Belfry before moving to St Mellion International Resort the following year.

== Winners ==
Year	Winner	Score	To par	Margin of victory	Runner(s)-up	Venue
2023	(England) Alex Fitzpatrick	276	−12	5 strokes	(Wales) Stuart Manley (England) Ross McGowan (France) Tom Vaillant	St Mellion
2022	(Scotland) Euan Walker	280	−8	1 stroke	(South Africa) J. C. Ritchie	St Mellion
2021	(Chile) Hugo León	269	−19	1 stroke	(South Africa) Oliver Bekker	The Belfry
