= Sun City Challenge =

Tournament information
- Location: Sun City, North West, South Africa
- Established: 2007
- Course: Gary Player Country Club
- Par: 72
- Length: 7,831 yards (7,161 m)
- Tour: Sunshine Tour
- Format: Stroke play
- Prize fund: R 1,000,000
- Month played: June
- Final year: 2019

Tournament record score
- Aggregate: 202 Adilson da Silva (2011)
- To par: −14 as above

Final champion
- (South Africa) Garrick Higgo

Location map
- Location in South Africa Location in North West

The Sun City Challenge was a golf tournament on the Sunshine Tour. It had been played annually since 2007.

From 2007 to 2011 it was called the Nashua Golf Challenge and was held at the Gary Player Country Club, although from 2007 to 2009 the second round was played at Lost City Golf Course. From 2012 to 2015 it was held at Lost City Golf Course, before returning to the Gary Player Country Club from 2016.

== Winners ==
Year	Winner	Score	To par	Margin of victory	Runner(s)-up
Sun City Challenge
2020	No tournament due to the COVID-19 pandemic				
2019	(South Africa) Garrick Higgo	209	−7	1 stroke	(South Africa) Ockie Strydom
2018	(South Africa) Neil Schietekat	210	−6	1 stroke	(South Africa) Louis de Jager
2017	(South Africa) Peter Karmis	210	−6	Playoff	(South Africa) Jake Roos
2016	(South Africa) Oliver Bekker	210	−6	1 stroke	(South Africa) Shaun Norris
2015	(South Africa) Keith Horne (2)	203	−13	5 strokes	(South Africa) Andrew Curlewis
2014	(South Africa) Dean Burmester	206	−10	1 stroke	(South Africa) Haydn Porteous
2013	(Brazil) Adilson da Silva (2)	207	−9	1 stroke	(South Africa) Jared Harvey
2012	(South Africa) Bryce Easton	207	−9	Playoff	(South Africa) Andrew Georgiou (South Africa) Brandon Pieters (South Africa) Allan Versfeld
Nashua Golf Challenge
2011	(Brazil) Adilson da Silva	202	−14	5 strokes	(South Africa) Trevor Fisher Jnr
2010	(South Africa) Jaco van Zyl	208	−8	5 strokes	(South Africa) Jean Hugo (South Africa) PH McIntyre
2009	(Scotland) Doug McGuigan	209	−7	2 strokes	(South Africa) Tyron van Aswegan
2008	(South Africa) Keith Horne	210	−6	Playoff	(South Africa) Nic Henning
2007	(South Africa) Warren Abery	207	−9	4 strokes	(Brazil) Adilson da Silva
