= Northern Cape Classic =

South African golf tournament

Tournament information
- Location: Kimberley, Northern Cape, South Africa
- Established: 2011
- Course: Kimberley Golf Club
- Par: 71
- Length: 6,980 yards (6,380 m)
- Tour: Sunshine Tour
- Format: Stroke play
- Prize fund: R 600,000
- Month played: September
- Final year: 2011

Tournament record score
- Aggregate: 198 Oliver Bekker (2011)
- To par: −15 as above

Final champion
- (South Africa) Oliver Bekker
- Location in South Africa Location in Northern Cape

The Northern Cape Classic was a golf tournament on the Sunshine Tour. It was played only in 2011 at the Kimberley Golf Club in Kimberley, Northern Cape, South Africa.

== Winners ==
Year	Winner	Score	To par	Margin of victory	Runner-up
2011	(South Africa) Oliver Bekker	198	−15	5 strokes	(South Africa) Bryce Easton
