= J. C. Ritchie =

South African professional golfer (born 1994)

Personal information
- Full name: Juan Carlo Ritchie
- Nationality: South Africa
- Born: 24 February 1994 (age 32) Standerton, South Africa
- Height: 5 ft 9 in (1.75 m)
- Weight: 235 lb (107 kg; 16.8 st)

Career
- Sport: Golf
- Turned professional: 2014
- Current tours: European Tour; Sunshine Tour
- Former tour: Challenge Tour
- Professional wins: 17

Number of wins by tour
- Sunshine Tour: 12
- Challenge Tour: 7 (Tied-2nd all-time)
- Other: 2

Best results in major championships
- Masters Tournament: DNP
- PGA Championship: DNP
- U.S. Open: CUT: 2020
- The Open Championship: T40: 2021

Achievements and awards
- Sunshine Tour Order of Merit winner: 2019–20
- Challenge Tour Rankings winner: 2025

Juan Carlo "J. C." Ritchie (born 24 February 1994) is a South African professional golfer. He plays on the European Tour and the Sunshine Tour where he has won 11 times.

== Professional career ==
Ritchie's first win on the Sunshine Tour was at Royal Harare Golf Club in the 2017 Zimbabwe Open where he beat Trevor Fisher Jnr at the second hole of a playoff. He was third in the 2018 BMW SA Open and also finished third in the 2017–18 Sunshine Tour Order of Merit. In August 2018 he won the Sun Carnival City Challenge. In March 2019, partnered with Jaco Prinsloo, he won the Sunshine Tour Team Championship and the following week won the Limpopo Championship at the first hole of a playoff with Steve Surry. The following month he won the Zanaco Masters in Zambia, again at the first hole of a playoff against Rhys Enoch. He had two further wins in early 2020, retaining the Team Championship and the Limpopo Championship in successive weeks.

In May 2021, Ritchie won the Bain's Whisky Cape Town Open, beating Jacques Blaauw in a sudden-death playoff. He successfully defended this title in February 2022, winning by one shot ahead of Christopher Mivis. The following week, he won the Jonsson Workwear Open, winning by six shots, again ahead of Mivis.

Ritchie won three times on the Challenge Tour in 2025, earning him an automatic promotion to the European Tour for the remainder of 2025 and all of 2026. He went on to finish season as the rankings winner.

== Professional wins (17) ==
=== Sunshine Tour wins (12) ===
No.	Date	Tournament	Winning score	To par	Margin of victory	Runner(s)-up
1	23 Apr 2017	Zimbabwe Open	74-67-67-64=272	−16	Playoff	(South Africa) Trevor Fisher Jnr
2	10 Aug 2018	Sun Carnival City Challenge	64-72-72=208	−8	1 stroke	(South Africa) Alex Haindl, (South Africa) Toto Thimba Jnr
3	2 Mar 2019	Team Championship (with (South Africa) Jaco Prinsloo)	61-66-62=189	−27	1 stroke	(South Africa) Jacques Blaauw and (South Africa) Merrick Bremner
4	10 Mar 2019	Limpopo Championship	66-69-70-65=270	−18	Playoff	(England) Steve Surry
5	7 Apr 2019	Zanaco Masters	70-68-66-70=274	−18	Playoff	(Wales) Rhys Enoch
6	25 Jan 2020	Gauteng Team Championship (2) (with (South Africa) Jaco Prinsloo)	61-68-62=191	−25	2 strokes	(South Africa) Jaco Ahlers and (South Africa) Vaughn Groenewald
7	2 Feb 2020	Limpopo Championship^{1} (2)	66-69-67-67=269	−19	2 strokes	(South Africa) Wilco Nienaber
8	2 May 2021	Bain's Whisky Cape Town Open^{1}	71-69-68-66=274	−14	Playoff	(South Africa) Jacques Blaauw
9	20 Feb 2022	Bain's Whisky Cape Town Open^{1} (2)	69-66-67-68=270	−18	1 stroke	(Belgium) Christopher Mivis
10	27 Feb 2022	Jonsson Workwear Open^{1}	61-63-65-71=260	−26	6 strokes	(Belgium) Christopher Mivis
11	15 Nov 2025	Stella Artois Players Championship	65-68-65-69=267	−17	2 strokes	(South Africa) Oliver Bekker, (South Africa) Christiaan Burke
12	15 Nov 2026	Hyundai Open	66-67-65-67=265	−23	2 strokes	(South Africa) Kyle de Beer, (South Africa) Yurav Premlall

^{1}Co-sanctioned by the Challenge Tour

Sunshine Tour playoff record (4–0)

No.	Year	Tournament	Opponent	Result
1	2017	Zimbabwe Open	(South Africa) Trevor Fisher Jnr	Won with birdie on second extra hole
2	2019	Limpopo Championship	(England) Steve Surry	Won with birdie on first extra hole
3	2019	Zanaco Masters	(Wales) Rhys Enoch	Won with birdie on first extra hole
4	2021	Bain's Whisky Cape Town Open	(South Africa) Jacques Blaauw	Won with birdie on first extra hole

=== Challenge Tour wins (7) ===
No.	Date	Tournament	Winning score	To par	Margin of victory	Runner(s)-up
1	2 Feb 2020	Limpopo Championship^{1}	66-69-67-67=269	−19	2 strokes	(South Africa) Wilco Nienaber
2	2 May 2021	Bain's Whisky Cape Town Open^{1}	71-69-68-66=274	−14	Playoff	(South Africa) Jacques Blaauw
3	20 Feb 2022	Bain's Whisky Cape Town Open^{1} (2)	69-66-67-68=270	−18	1 stroke	(Belgium) Christopher Mivis
4	27 Feb 2022	Jonsson Workwear Open^{1}	61-63-65-71=260	−26	6 strokes	(Belgium) Christopher Mivis
5	20 Jul 2025	German Challenge	66-66-66-66=264	−24	8 strokes	(England) Joshua Berry, (England) Tom Lewis
6	14 Sep 2025	Open de Portugal	70-66-67-66=269	−15	1 stroke	(Scotland) David Law
7	21 Sep 2025	Italian Challenge Open	69-63-68-68=268	−20	2 strokes	(Sweden) Robin Petersson, (Sweden) Christofer Rahm

^{1}Co-sanctioned by the Sunshine Tour

Challenge Tour playoff record (1–0)

No.	Year	Tournament	Opponent	Result
1	2021	Bain's Whisky Cape Town Open	(South Africa) Jacques Blaauw	Won with birdie on first extra hole

=== IGT Pro Tour wins (2) ===
No.	Date	Tournament	Winning score	Margin of victory	Runner-up
1	7 Aug 2013	IGT Winter Challenge State Mines CC	−8 (72-65-71=208)	2 strokes	(South Africa) Rhys West
2	13 Aug 2014	Race to Asian Q-School Irene Country Club	−17 (65-67-67=199)	5 strokes	(South Africa) Jason Smith (a)

== Results in major championships ==
Results not in chronological order in 2020.

Tournament	2020	2021
Masters Tournament		
PGA Championship		
U.S. Open	CUT	
The Open Championship	NT	T40

Did not play

CUT = missed the half-way cut
NT = No tournament due to COVID-19 pandemic

== Results in World Golf Championships ==
Tournament	2018	2019	2020	2021
Championship				T68
Match Play			NT^{1}	
Invitational				
Champions	76		NT^{1}	NT^{1}

^{1}Cancelled due to COVID-19 pandemic

Did not play

NT = No tournament
"T" = Tied

== See also ==
- 2022 Challenge Tour graduates
- 2025 Challenge Tour graduates
- List of golfers with most Challenge Tour wins
- List of golfers to achieve a three-win promotion from the Challenge Tour
