= 2016–17 Sunshine Tour =

Golf tour season

2016–17 Sunshine Tour season
- Duration: 7 January 2016 – 5 March 2017
- Number of official events: 31
- Most wins: (South Africa) Jaco Ahlers (3)
- Order of Merit: (South Africa) Brandon Stone
- Rookie of the Year: (South Africa) Christiaan Bezuidenhout

The 2016–17 Sunshine Tour was the 46th season of the Sunshine Tour (formerly the Southern Africa Tour), the main professional golf tour in South Africa since it was formed in 1971.

== Schedule ==
The following table lists official events during the 2016–17 season.

Date	Tournament	Location	Purse (R)	Winner (Note: The number in brackets after each winner's name is the number of Sunshine Tour events they had won up to and including that tournament. This information is only shown for Sunshine Tour members.)	OWGR points	Other tours (Note: ASA − Asian Tour; EUR − European Tour.)	Notes
10 Jan	BMW SA Open	Gauteng	15,000,000	(South Africa) Brandon Stone (2)	32	EUR	Flagship event
17 Jan	Joburg Open	Gauteng	16,500,000	(South Africa) Haydn Porteous (1)	19	EUR	
14 Feb	Tshwane Open	Gauteng	18,500,000	(South Africa) Charl Schwartzel (9)	19	EUR	
21 Feb	Dimension Data Pro-Am	Western Cape	5,000,000	(South Africa) George Coetzee (8)	14		Pro-Am
28 Feb	Eye of Africa PGA Championship	Gauteng	1,200,000	(South Africa) Jaco van Zyl (14)	14		
12 Mar	Investec Cup	North West	10,000,000	(South Africa) Haydn Porteous (2)	n/a		
17 Apr	Golden Pilsener Zimbabwe Open	Zimbabwe	1,800,000	(South Africa) Lyle Rowe (2)	14		
24 Apr	Zambia Sugar Open	Zambia	1,500,000	(Sweden) Christofer Blomstrand (1)	14		
7 May	Investec Royal Swazi Open	Swaziland	1,400,000	(South Africa) Titch Moore (10)	14		
15 May	AfrAsia Bank Mauritius Open	Mauritius	€1,000,000	(South Korea) Wang Jeung-hun (n/a)	17	ASA, EUR	
22 May	Lombard Insurance Classic	Swaziland	1,200,000	(South Africa) Merrick Bremner (5)	4		
5 Jun	KCM Zambia Open	Zambia	2,000,000	(South Africa) Jaco Ahlers (4)	14		
30 Jul	Vodacom Origins of Golf at Wild Coast Sun	KwaZulu-Natal	700,000	(Zambia) Madalitso Muthiya (1)	4		
6 Aug	Sun City Challenge	North West	700,000	(South Africa) Oliver Bekker (4)	7		
20 Aug	Vodacom Origins of Golf at Arabella	Western Cape	700,000	(South Africa) Vaughn Groenewald (5)	4		
26 Aug	Sun Wild Coast Sun Challenge	KwaZulu-Natal	700,000	(South Africa) Jaco Ahlers (5)	4		
10 Sep	Vodacom Origins of Golf at Sishen	Northern Cape	700,000	(South Africa) Jacques Blaauw (4)	4		
23 Sep	Sun Carnival City Challenge	Gauteng	700,000	(South Africa) Ruan de Smidt (3)	4		New tournament
1 Oct	Vodacom Origins of Golf at Simola	Western Cape	700,000	(South Africa) Justin Harding (5)	4		
8 Oct	Sun Boardwalk Challenge	Eastern Cape	700,000	(South Africa) Ruan de Smidt (4)	4		
14 Oct	Sun Fish River Challenge	Eastern Cape	700,000	(South Africa) Christiaan Bezuidenhout (1)	4		
22 Oct	Vodacom Origins of Golf at Euphoria	Gauteng	700,000	(South Africa) Jaco Ahlers (6)	7		
28 Oct	Sun Sibaya Challenge	KwaZulu-Natal	700,000	(South Africa) Peter Karmis (3)	7		
5 Nov	Vodacom Origins of Golf Final	Eastern Cape	700,000	(Zimbabwe) Mark Williams (1)	4		
27 Nov	Lion of Africa Cape Town Open	Western Cape	1,500,000	(South Africa) Jacques Kruyswijk (1)	14		
4 Dec	Alfred Dunhill Championship	Mpumalanga	€1,200,000	(South Africa) Brandon Stone (3)	32	EUR	Flagship event
15 Jan	BMW SA Open	Gauteng	15,000,000	(England) Graeme Storm (n/a)	26	EUR	
12 Feb	Eye of Africa PGA Championship	Gauteng	1,500,000	(South Africa) Erik van Rooyen (1)	14		
19 Feb	Dimension Data Pro-Am	Western Cape	5,050,000	(Scotland) Paul Lawrie (n/a)	14		
26 Feb	Joburg Open	Gauteng	16,500,000	(South Africa) Darren Fichardt (15)	19	EUR	
5 Mar	Tshwane Open	Gauteng	18,500,000	(South Africa) Dean Burmester (7)	19	EUR	

== Order of Merit ==
The Order of Merit was based on prize money won during the season, calculated in South African rand.

Position	Player	Prize money (R)
1	(South Africa) Brandon Stone	7,384,889
2	(South Africa) Dean Burmester	5,955,793
3	(South Africa) Darren Fichardt	3,303,541
4	(South Africa) Haydn Porteous	3,277,711
5	(South Africa) Zander Lombard	3,021,640

== Awards ==
Award	Winner	Ref.
Rookie of the Year (Bobby Locke Trophy)	(South Africa) Christiaan Bezuidenhout	

== See also ==
- 2016 Big Easy Tour
