= 2019–20 Sunshine Tour =

Golf tour season

2019–20 Sunshine Tour season
- Duration: 28 March 2019 – 23 February 2020
- Number of official events: 25 (Note: One further tournament was scheduled but was cancelled.)
- Most wins: (South Africa) J. C. Ritchie (3)
- Order of Merit: (South Africa) J. C. Ritchie
- Rookie of the Year: (South Africa) Garrick Higgo

The 2019–20 Sunshine Tour was the 49th season of the Sunshine Tour (formerly the Southern Africa Tour), the main professional golf tour in South Africa since it was formed in 1971.

== Schedule ==
The following table lists official events during the 2019–20 season.

Date	Tournament	Location	Purse (R)	Winner (Note: The number in brackets after each winner's name is the number of Sunshine Tour events they had won up to and including that tournament. This information is only shown for Sunshine Tour members.)	OWGR points	Other tours (Note: ASA − Asian Tour; CHA − Challenge Tour; EUR − European Tour.)	Notes
31 Mar	Mopani Redpath Greendoor Logistics Zambia Open	Zambia	2,500,000	(South Africa) Daniel van Tonder (3)	14		
7 Apr	Zanaco Masters	Zambia	2,000,000	(South Africa) J. C. Ritchie (5)	14		
4 May	Investec Royal Swazi Open	Eswatini	1,500,000	(South Africa) Martin Rohwer (1)	14		
19 May	Lombard Insurance Classic	Eswatini	1,000,000	(South Africa) Jake Redman (1)	4		
7 Jun	Sun City Challenge	North West	1,000,000	(South Africa) Garrick Higgo (1)	7		
30 Jun	KCB Karen Masters	Kenya	2,200,000	(South Africa) Toto Thimba Jr. (1)	14		
2 Aug	Royal Swazi Spa Challenge	Eswatini	1,000,000	(South Africa) Ruan Conradie (1)	7		
24 Aug	Vodacom Origins of Golf at Sishen	Northern Cape	1,000,000	(South Africa) Ockie Strydom (1)	4		
~~1 Sep~~	Zimbabwe Open	Zimbabwe	–	Cancelled	–		
7 Sep	King's Cup	Eswatini	1,000,000	(South Africa) Jaco Ahlers (8)	7		New tournament
28 Sep	Vodacom Origins of Golf at Humewood	Eastern Cape	1,000,000	(South Africa) Merrick Bremner (6)	4		
5 Oct	Vodacom Origins of Golf at Stellenbosch	Western Cape	1,000,000	(South Africa) Thriston Lawrence (1)	4		
11 Oct	Sun Wild Coast Sun Challenge	KwaZulu-Natal	1,000,000	(South Africa) Jean Hugo (19)	7		
19 Oct	Vodacom Origins of Golf at Selborne Park	KwaZulu-Natal	1,000,000	(South Africa) Jaco Ahlers (9)	7		
25 Oct	Sibaya Challenge	KwaZulu-Natal	1,000,000	(South Africa) Hennie Otto (13)	7		
2 Nov	Vodacom Origins of Golf Final	Western Cape	1,000,000	(South Africa) George Coetzee (10)	7		
17 Nov	Nedbank Golf Challenge	North West	US$7,500,000	(England) Tommy Fleetwood (n/a)	36	EUR (Note: European Tour Rolex Series)	Limited-field event
1 Dec	Alfred Dunhill Championship	Mpumalanga	€1,500,000	(Spain) Pablo Larrazábal (n/a)	19	EUR	
8 Dec	AfrAsia Bank Mauritius Open	Mauritius	€1,000,000	(Denmark) Rasmus Højgaard (n/a)	17	ASA, EUR	
12 Jan	South African Open	Gauteng	17,500,000	(South Africa) Branden Grace (6)	32	EUR	Flagship event
19 Jan	Eye of Africa PGA Championship	Gauteng	2,000,000	(South Africa) Darren Fichardt (17)	14		
25 Jan	Gauteng Team Championship	Gauteng	1,500,000	(South Africa) Jaco Prinsloo (3) and (South Africa) J. C. Ritchie (6)	n/a		Team event
2 Feb	Limpopo Championship	Limpopo	3,500,000	(South Africa) J. C. Ritchie (7)	13	CHA	
9 Feb	RAM Cape Town Open	Western Cape	3,500,000	(Sweden) Anton Karlsson (n/a)	13	CHA	
16 Feb	Dimension Data Pro-Am	Western Cape	6,300,000	(South Africa) Christiaan Bezuidenhout (2)	13	CHA	Pro-Am
23 Feb	The Tour Championship	Gauteng	1,500,000	(South Africa) Garrick Higgo (2)	14		Tour Championship

== Order of Merit ==
The Order of Merit was based on prize money won during the season, calculated in South African rand.

Position	Player	Prize money (R)
1	(South Africa) J. C. Ritchie	2,162,387
2	(South Africa) Daniel van Tonder	2,043,268
3	(South Africa) Jaco Ahlers	1,902,195
4	(South Africa) George Coetzee	1,722,930
5	(South Africa) Thriston Lawrence	1,377,891

== Awards ==
Award	Winner	Ref.
Rookie of the Year (Bobby Locke Trophy)	(South Africa) Garrick Higgo	

== See also ==
- 2019 Big Easy Tour
