= Theunis Spangenberg =

South African professional golfer (born 1983)

Personal information
- Full name: Theunis Gerhardus Spangenberg
- Nationality: South Africa
- Born: 6 April 1983 (age 43) Kathu, South Africa
- Height: 1.80 m (5 ft 11 in)
- Weight: 75 kg (165 lb; 11.8 st)

Career
- Sport: Golf
- Turned professional: 2005
- Current tour: Sunshine Tour
- Professional wins: 1

Number of wins by tour
- Sunshine Tour: 1

Theunis Gerhardus Spangenberg (born 6 April 1983) is a South African professional golfer.

== Career ==
Spangenberg plays on the Sunshine Tour, where he has one win, the 2011 Africom Zimbabwe Open.

== Professional wins (1) ==
=== Sunshine Tour wins (1) ===
No.	Date	Tournament	Winning score	Margin of victory	Runner-up
1	29 Jan 2011	Africom Zimbabwe Open	−15 (64-67-70=201) (Note: Shortened to 54 holes due to weather.)	2 strokes	(South Africa) Matthew Carvell

Sunshine Tour playoff record (0–1)

No.	Year	Tournament	Opponent	Result
1	2016	Vodacom Origins of Golf at Sishen	(South Africa) Jacques Blaauw	Lost to birdie on first extra hole
