= 2017–18 Sunshine Tour =

Golf tour season

2017–18 Sunshine Tour season
- Duration: 20 April 2017 – 18 March 2018
- Number of official events: 26
- Most wins: (South Africa) Oliver Bekker (3)
- Order of Merit: (South Africa) George Coetzee
- Players' Player of the Year: (South Africa) Oliver Bekker
- Rookie of the Year: (Republic of Ireland) Neil O'Briain

The 2017–18 Sunshine Tour was the 47th season of the Sunshine Tour (formerly the Southern Africa Tour), the main professional golf tour in South Africa since it was formed in 1971.

== Schedule ==
The following table lists official events during the 2017–18 season.

Date	Tournament	Location	Purse (R)	Winner (Note: The number in brackets after each winner's name is the number of Sunshine Tour events they had won up to and including that tournament. This information is only shown for Sunshine Tour members.)	OWGR points	Other tours (Note: ASA − Asian Tour; EUR − European Tour.)	Notes
23 Apr	Zimbabwe Open	Zimbabwe	1,800,000	(South Africa) J. C. Ritchie (1)	14		
30 Apr	Zambia Sugar Open	Zambia	1,600,000	(South Africa) Oliver Bekker (5)	14		
6 May	Investec Royal Swazi Open	Swaziland	1,200,000	(South Africa) Peter Karmis (4)	14		
21 May	Lombard Insurance Classic	Swaziland	1,000,000	(South Africa) Oliver Bekker (6)	4		
4 Jun	Mopani Redpath Zambia Open	Zambia	US$150,000	(South Africa) Riekus Nortje (1)	14		
29 Jul	Vodacom Origins of Golf at Highland Gate	Mpumalanga	750,000	(Scotland) Doug McGuigan (7)	7		
4 Aug	Sun City Challenge	North West	750,000	(South Africa) Peter Karmis (5)	7		
11 Aug	Sun Carnival City Challenge	Gauteng	750,000	(South Africa) Jbe' Kruger (4)	4		
19 Aug	Vodacom Origins of Golf at Arabella	Western Cape	750,000	(South Africa) Keith Horne (9)	4		
25 Aug	Sun Wild Coast Sun Challenge	KwaZulu-Natal	750,000	(South Africa) Oliver Bekker (7)	4		
2 Sep	Vodacom Origins of Golf at Zimbali	KwaZulu-Natal	750,000	(South Africa) Jared Harvey (1)	4		
8 Sep	Sun Fish River Challenge	Eastern Cape	750,000	(South Africa) M. J. Viljoen (1)	4		
15 Sep	Sun Boardwalk Challenge	Eastern Cape	750,000	(South Africa) Tyrone Ryan (1)	4		
23 Sep	Vodacom Origins of Golf at St Francis	Eastern Cape	750,000	(Scotland) Doug McGuigan (8)	4		
14 Oct	Vodacom Origins of Golf at Sishen	Northern Cape	750,000	(South Africa) Hennie du Plessis (1)	4		
27 Oct	Sun Sibaya Challenge	KwaZulu-Natal	750,000	(South Africa) Alex Haindl (2)	4		
4 Nov	Vodacom Origins of Golf Final	Western Cape	750,000	(South Africa) Jaco Prinsloo (1)	4		
3 Dec	AfrAsia Bank Mauritius Open	Mauritius	€1,000,000	(South Africa) Dylan Frittelli (1)	17	ASA, EUR	
11 Dec	Joburg Open	Gauteng	16,500,000	(India) Shubhankar Sharma (n/a)	17	ASA, EUR	
14 Jan	BMW SA Open	Gauteng	15,000,000	(England) Chris Paisley (n/a)	32	EUR	Flagship event
1 Feb	Eye of Africa PGA Championship	Gauteng	1,500,000	(Chile) Matías Calderón (1)	14		
18 Feb	Dimension Data Pro-Am	Western Cape	5,050,000	(South Africa) Jaco Ahlers (7)	14		Pro-Am
25 Feb	Cape Town Open	Western Cape	1,500,000	(Wales) Rhys Enoch (1)	14		
4 Mar	Tshwane Open	Gauteng	15,000,000	(South Africa) George Coetzee (9)	19	EUR	
7 Mar	Steyn City Team Championship	Gauteng	1,000,000	(South Africa) Hennie du Plessis (2) and (South Africa) Jean Hugo (18)	n/a		New team event
18 Mar	The Tour Championship	Gauteng	1,500,000	(South Africa) Darren Fichardt (16)	14		Tour Championship

== Order of Merit ==
The Order of Merit was based on prize money won during the season, calculated in South African rand.

Position	Player	Prize money (R)
1	(South Africa) George Coetzee	2,937,226
2	(South Africa) Erik van Rooyen	2,359,847
3	(South Africa) J. C. Ritchie	2,033,965
4	(South Africa) Oliver Bekker	1,562,989
5	(South Africa) Ockie Strydom	1,415,499

== Awards ==
Award	Winner	Ref.
Players' Player of the Year	(South Africa) Oliver Bekker	
Rookie of the Year (Bobby Locke Trophy)	(Republic of Ireland) Neil O'Briain	

== See also ==
- 2017 Big Easy Tour
