= Brandon Pieters =

South African professional golfer

Personal information
- Full name: Brandon Paul Pieters
- Nationality: South Africa
- Born: 22 April 1976 (age 50) Germiston, South Africa
- Height: 1.93 m (6 ft 4 in)
- Weight: 106 kg (234 lb; 16.7 st)

Career
- Sport: Golf
- Turned professional: 1994
- Current tour: Sunshine Tour
- Former tour: Big Easy Tour
- Professional wins: 5

Number of wins by tour
- Sunshine Tour: 4
- Other: 1

Brandon Paul Pieters (born 22 April 1976) is a South African professional golfer.

== Career ==
In 1976, Pieters was born in Germiston, Gauteng.

In 1994, Pieters turned professional. He has played on the Sunshine Tour since then. His best finish on the Order of Merit came in 2008 when he finished in 32nd. Pieters picked up his first professional victory in May 2009 at the Vodacom Business Origins of Golf Tour event at Pretoria CC. He picked up his second win a month later at the Vodcacom Business Origins of Golf Tour event at Fancourt, and went on to claim victory at that season's Vodacom Business Origins of Golf Tour Final in October.

== Professional wins (5) ==
=== Sunshine Tour wins (4) ===
| No. | Date | Tournament | Winning score | Margin of victory | Runner(s)-up |
|---|---|---|---|---|---|
| 1 | 22 May 2009 | Vodacom Origins of Golf at Pretoria | −12 (65-67-72=204) | 1 stroke | (South Africa) Darren Fichardt |
| 2 | 25 Jun 2009 | Vodacom Origins of Golf (2) at Fancourt | −3 (72-68=141) (Note: Shortened to 36 holes due to weather.) | 1 stroke | (South Africa) Clinton Whitelaw |
| 3 | 9 Oct 2009 | Vodacom Origins of Golf Final (3) | −8 (70-69-69=208) | 1 stroke | (Scotland) Doug McGuigan, (South Africa) Jaco van Zyl |
| 4 | 14 Nov 2010 | BMG Classic | −11 (71-68-66=205) | Playoff | (England) Ben Mannix |

Sunshine Tour playoff record (1–1)

| No. | Year | Tournament | Opponent(s) | Result |
|---|---|---|---|---|
| 1 | 2010 | BMG Classic | (England) Ben Mannix | Won with par on first extra hole |
| 2 | 2012 | Sun City Challenge | (South Africa) Bryce Easton, (South Africa) Andrew Georgiou, (South Africa) Allan Versfeld | Easton won with eagle on first extra hole |

=== IGT Pro Tour wins (1) ===
| No. | Date | Tournament | Winning score | Margin of victory | Runner-up |
|---|---|---|---|---|---|
| 1 | 4 Oct 2017 | Zwartkop Match Play | 1 up | | (South Africa) Thriston Lawrence |
