= 2021–22 Sunshine Tour =

Golf tour season

2021–22 Sunshine Tour season
- Duration: 5 March 2021 – 1 May 2022
- Number of official events: 30 (Note: A further 11 tournaments were scheduled but were either cancelled, postponed or otherwise removed from the schedule.)
- Most wins: (South Africa) J. C. Ritchie (3)
- Order of Merit: (South Africa) Shaun Norris
- Rookie of the Year: (South Africa) Jayden Schaper

The 2021–22 Sunshine Tour was the 51st season of the Sunshine Tour (formerly the Southern Africa Tour), the main professional golf tour in South Africa since it was formed in 1971.

== In-season changes ==
In January 2021, the schedule was again disrupted by the COVID-19 pandemic as several tournaments scheduled for early in the year were postponed by a month or more, with the season restarting in March. Among the tournaments affected were three co-sanctioned events with the Challenge Tour.

== European Tour partnership ==
The season marked the start of a partnership between the Sunshine Tour and the European Tour. As part of the agreement, the top three players on the Sunshine Tour Order of Merit (not otherwise exempt) gained status to play on the European Tour for the following season.

== Schedule ==
The following table lists official events during the 2021–22 season.

| Date | Tournament | Location | Purse (R) | Winner (Note: The number in brackets after each winner's name is the number of Sunshine Tour events they had won up to and including that tournament. This information is only shown for Sunshine Tour members.) | OWGR points | Other tours (Note: CHA − Challenge Tour; EUR − European Tour.) | Notes |
|---|---|---|---|---|---|---|---|
| 7 Mar (Note: Originally postponed due to the COVID-19 pandemic.); ~~7 Feb~~ | Kit Kat Group Pro-Am | Gauteng | 1,000,000 | (Wales) Rhys Enoch (2) | 8 | | New Pro-Am tournament |
| 14 Mar | Players Championship | Gauteng | 1,000,000 | (South Africa) Jaco Prinsloo (4) | 14 | | New tournament |
| 21 Mar | Gauteng Championship | Gauteng | 1,000,000 | (South Africa) Jbe' Kruger (5) | 14 | | New tournament |
| 28 Mar | Serengeti Pro-Am Invitational | Gauteng | 1,500,000 | (South Africa) Jaco Prinsloo (5) | 14 | | New Pro-Am tournament |
| ~~28 Mar~~ | The Tour Championship | Gauteng | – | Removed (Note: Removed from the schedule due to the COVID-19 pandemic.) | – | | Tour Championship |
| ~~18 Apr~~ | Zanaco Masters | Zambia | – | Removed | – | | |
| 25 Apr; ~~28 Feb~~ | Limpopo Championship | Limpopo | 3,000,000 | (South Africa) Brandon Stone (4) | 13 | CHA | |
| 2 May; ~~21 Feb~~ | Bain's Whisky Cape Town Open | Western Cape | 3,000,000 | (South Africa) J. C. Ritchie (8) | 13 | CHA | |
| 9 May; ~~14 Feb~~ | Dimension Data Pro-Am | Western Cape | 6,000,000 | (South Africa) Wilco Nienaber (1) | 13 | CHA | Pro-Am |
| 4 Jun | SunBet Challenge (Sun City) | North West | 1,000,000 | (South Africa) Alex Haindl (3) | 7 | | New tournament series |
| 6 Aug | Vodacom Origins of Golf at De Zalze | Western Cape | 1,000,000 | (South Africa) George Coetzee (12) | 7 | | |
| ~~13 Aug~~ | FNB Eswatini Nkonyeni Challenge | Eswatini | – | Removed | – | | New tournament |
| 20 Aug | SunBet Challenge (Time Square Casino) | Gauteng | 1,000,000 | (South Africa) Estiaan Conradie (1) | 4 | | |
| 28 Aug | Vodacom Origins of Golf at Sishen | Gauteng | 1,000,000 | (South Africa) Alex Haindl (4) | 4 | | |
| ~~4 Sep~~ | King's Cup | Eswatini | – | Removed | – | | |
| 10 Sep | Sunshine Tour Invitational | Gauteng | 1,000,000 | (South Africa) Jacques Kruyswijk (2) | 4 | | New tournament |
| ~~12 Sep~~ | Zanaco Masters | Zambia | – | Removed | – | | |
| 18 Sep | Vodacom Origins of Golf at Mount Edgecombe | KwaZulu-Natal | 1,000,000 | (South Africa) Louis Albertse (1) | 4 | | |
| ~~26 Sep~~ | Karen Masters | Kenya | – | Removed | – | | |
| 2 Oct | Vodacom Origins of Golf at Humewood | Eastern Cape | 1,000,000 | (South Africa) Daniel Greene (1) | 4 | | |
| ~~9 Oct~~ | SunBet Challenge (Wild Coast Sun) | KwaZulu-Natal | – | Cancelled (Note: Cancelled due to rain.) | – | | |
| 16 Oct | Blue Label Challenge | North West | 1,500,000 | (South Africa) Lyle Rowe (3) | 14 | | New tournament |
| 24 Oct | Blair Atholl Championship | Gauteng | 1,250,000 | (South Africa) Luke Brown (1) | 14 | | New tournament |
| 7 Nov | PGA Championship | Eastern Cape | 1,200,000 | (South Africa) Dean Burmester (8) | 14 | | |
| ~~14 Nov~~ | Nedbank Golf Challenge | North West | – | Cancelled | – | EUR | Limited-field event |
| 27 Nov | Joburg Open | Gauteng | 17,500,000 | (South Africa) Thriston Lawrence (2) | 19 | EUR | |
| 5 Dec | SA Open Championship | North West | US$500,000 (Note: Reduced from US$1,500,000 after losing European Tour co-sanctioning as a result of COVID-19 related travel restrictions.) | (South Africa) Daniel van Tonder (8) | 32 | ~~EUR~~ | Flagship event |
| ~~12 Dec~~ | Alfred Dunhill Championship | Mpumalanga | – | Cancelled | – | EUR | |
| 30 Jan | Vodacom Origins of Golf Final | North West | 1,000,000 | (South Africa) Martin Rohwer (2) | 8 | | |
| ~~6 Feb~~ | Kit Kat Group Pro-Am | Gauteng | – | Cancelled (Note: Cancelled after one round due to rain.) | – | | Pro-Am |
| 13 Feb | Dimension Data Pro-Am | Western Cape | 6,000,000 | (Germany) Alexander Knappe (1) | 13 | CHA | Pro-Am |
| 20 Feb | Bain's Whisky Cape Town Open | Western Cape | US$250,000 | (South Africa) J. C. Ritchie (9) | 13 | CHA | |
| 27 Feb | Jonsson Workwear Open | KwaZulu-Natal | US$250,000 | (South Africa) J. C. Ritchie (10) | 13 | CHA | New tournament |
| 6 Mar | Mangaung Open | Free State | US$250,000 | (Denmark) Oliver Hundebøll (n/a) | 13 | CHA | New tournament |
| 13 Mar | MyGolfLife Open | North West | US$1,500,000 | (Spain) Pablo Larrazábal (n/a) | 23 | EUR | New tournament |
| 20 Mar | Steyn City Championship | Gauteng | US$1,500,000 | (South Africa) Shaun Norris (3) | 19 | EUR | New tournament |
| 27 Mar | SDC Open | Limpopo | US$250,000 | (France) Clément Sordet (n/a) | 13 | CHA | New tournament |
| 3 Apr | Limpopo Championship | Limpopo | US$250,000 | (Poland) Mateusz Gradecki (n/a) | 13 | CHA | |
| ~~10 Apr~~ | Mount Kilamanjaro Klassic | Tanzania | – | Removed | – | CHA | New tournament |
| 24 Apr | Stella Artois Players Championship | Gauteng | 2,000,000 | (South Africa) Jaco Ahlers (10) | 14 | | |
| 1 May | The Tour Championship | Gauteng | 1,500,000 | (South Africa) Tristen Strydom (1) | 14 | | Tour Championship |

=== Unofficial events ===
The following events were sanctioned by the Sunshine Tour, but did not carry official money, nor were wins official.

| Date | Tournament | Location | Purse (R) | Winner | OWGR points | Other tours | Notes |
|---|---|---|---|---|---|---|---|
| 6 May | Altron Vusi Ngubeni Tournament | Gauteng | 100,000 | (South Africa) Yubin Jung | n/a | | New tournament |

== Order of Merit ==
The Order of Merit was based on prize money won during the season, calculated in South African rand. The top three players on the Order of Merit (not otherwise exempt) earned status to play on the 2023 European Tour (DP World Tour).

| Position | Player | Prize money (R) | Status earned |
|---|---|---|---|
| 1 | (South Africa) Shaun Norris | 4,890,994 | Already exempt (Note: Norris and Lawrence were already exempt due to being tournament winners on the 2022 European Tour (DP World Tour).) |
| 2 | (South Africa) Dean Burmester | 4,196,182 | Already exempt (Note: Burmester, Bekker, du Plessis, Lombard and Coetzee were already exempt due to finishing inside the Top 117 of the 2022 DP World Tour Rankings.) |
| 3 | (South Africa) Thriston Lawrence | 3,854,950 | Already exempt |
| 4 | (South Africa) Oliver Bekker | 3,359,398 | Already exempt |
| 5 | (South Africa) Hennie du Plessis | 2,779,485 | Already exempt |
| 6 | (South Africa) J. C. Ritchie | 2,691,199 | Already exempt (Note: Ritchie was already exempt due to finishing inside the Top 20 of the 2022 Challenge Tour Rankings.) |
| 7 | (South Africa) Zander Lombard | 1,949,393 | Already exempt |
| 8 | (South Africa) Daniel van Tonder | 1,943,891 | Promoted to European Tour |
| 9 | (South Africa) Tristen Strydom | 1,843,480 | Promoted to European Tour |
| 10 | (South Africa) George Coetzee | 1,816,637 | Already exempt |
| 11 | (South Africa) Wilco Nienaber | 1,735,209 | Promoted to European Tour |

== Awards ==
| Award | Winner | Ref. |
|---|---|---|
| Rookie of the Year (Bobby Locke Trophy) | (South Africa) Jayden Schaper | |

== See also ==
- 2020–21 Big Easy Tour
