= Hennie du Plessis =

South African professional golfer (born 1996)

Personal information
- Nationality: South Africa
- Born: 14 October 1996 (age 30)

Career
- Sport: Golf
- Turned professional: 2015
- Current tours: European Tour; Sunshine Tour
- Former tours: Challenge Tour; LIV Golf
- Professional wins: 5

Number of wins by tour
- Sunshine Tour: 3
- Other: 2

Best results in major championships
- Masters Tournament: DNP
- PGA Championship: DNP
- U.S. Open: CUT: 2026
- The Open Championship: T46: 2026

Hennie du Plessis (born 14 October 1996) is a South African professional golfer who currently plays on the European Tour and the Sunshine Tour. He also played in the inaugural LIV Golf Invitational Series.

== Professional career ==
Du Plessis turned professional in 2015 and joined the Sunshine Tour after finishing number one at Q-School. In 2016 he recorded five top-5 finishes, including a tie for second at Vodacom Origins of Golf at Wild Coast Sun, behind Madalitso Muthiya. On the 2017–18 Sunshine Tour he won the Vodacom Origins of Golf at Sishen, clinching his maiden Sunshine Tour title on his 21st birthday. In March he won the Steyn City Team Championship with Jean Hugo.

Du Plessis tied for 6th at both of the South African Opens played in 2020, in January and December. At the 2021 installment, which lost European Tour co-sanctioning as a result of COVID-19 related travel restrictions, he finished solo 3rd, which helped him break into the top-200 on the Official World Golf Ranking for the first time.

He played on the 2021 Challenge Tour, where he lost a four-way playoff at the Limpopo Championship to Brandon Stone. He finished 28th in the Road to Mallorca ranking.

Du Plessis finished runner-up at the 2022 LIV Golf Invitational London, a single stroke behind his compatriot Charl Schwartzel, to collect a US$2,125,000 check. He also won the team event together with an all-South African team of Schwartzel, Branden Grace and Louis Oosthuizen, to collect a further $750,000.

=== European Tour ===
In 2022 Du Plessis joined the European Tour, where he recorded five top-10 finishes in 15 starts. He finished tied 3rd at the ISPS Handa Championship in Spain, two strokes behind winner Pablo Larrazábal, and tied for 6th at the Catalunya Championship, trailing winner Adri Arnaus by three strokes. He came close to a first European Tour victory in wire-to-wire style when he took a two-shot lead into the final round of the MyGolfLife Open in South Africa. He was part of a four-way tie after a 62 on day one and followed that with a 65 to take a one-shot lead into the weekend. A 70 in round three was enough to move him to 19 under and give him a two stroke advantage. A final day 72 saw him drop to a tie for 6th, 3 strokes shy of the three-way playoff won by Pablo Larrazábal. He rose to a career-high odf 122nd in the Official World Golf Ranking.

Du Plessis again came close to securing his maiden European Tour title at the 2023 Jonsson Workwear Open, where he was runner-up behind Nick Bachem. In 2026, he narrowly missed out on his first win on three consecutive starts in Africa including at the South African Open, where he was runner-up behind Casey Jarvis.

At the 2026 BMW International Open in Germany, du Plessis held the lead for much of the tournament after an opening round of 64, only to ultimately being bettered by a shot by compatriot Michael Hollick, who eagled the final hole.

== Professional wins (5) ==
=== Sunshine Tour wins (3) ===
No.	Date	Tournament	Winning score	Margin of victory	Runner(s)-up
1	14 Oct 2017	Vodacom Origins of Golf at Sishen	−12 (66-66-72=204)	Playoff	(South Africa) Ockie Strydom
2	7 Mar 2018	Steyn City Team Championship (with (South Africa) Jean Hugo)	−23 (66-66-61=193)	1 stroke	(South Africa) Christiaan Bezuidenhout and (South Africa) Kyle McClatchie
3	25 Oct 2025	Blu Label Unlimited Challenge	49 pts (13-10-18-8=49)	14 points	(South Africa) Anthony Michael

Sunshine Tour playoff record (1–2)

No.	Year	Tournament	Opponent(s)	Result
1	2017	Vodacom Origins of Golf at Sishen	(South Africa) Ockie Strydom	Won with birdie on fourth extra hole
2	2018	Sun Wild Coast Sun Challenge	(Brazil) Adilson da Silva, (South Africa) Darren Fichardt, (South Africa) Vaughn Groenewald	Groenewald won with birdie on first extra hole
3	2021	Limpopo Championship	(South Africa) Oliver Bekker, (South Africa) Brandon Stone, (South Africa) Daniel van Tonder	Stone won with birdie on first extra hole

=== IGT Pro Tour wins (1) ===
No.	Date	Tournament	Winning score	Margin of victory	Runner-up
1	27 May 2015	GFG Academy Classic	−13 (65-68-70=203)	Playoff	(South Africa) Bryandrew Roelofsz

=== Other wins (1) ===
- 2018 Gary Player Invitational Pro-Am (South Africa)

== Playoff record ==
Challenge Tour playoff record (0–1)

No.	Year	Tournament	Opponents	Result
1	2021	Limpopo Championship	(South Africa) Oliver Bekker, (South Africa) Brandon Stone, (South Africa) Daniel van Tonder	Stone won with birdie on first extra hole

== Results in major championships ==
Tournament	2026
Masters Tournament	
PGA Championship	
U.S. Open	CUT
The Open Championship	T46

Did not play

CUT = missed the half-way cut
"T" = tied
