= 2022–23 Sunshine Tour =

Golf tour season

2022–23 Sunshine Tour season
- Duration: 13 May 2022 – 23 April 2023
- Number of official events: 33
- Most wins: (South Africa) George Coetzee (2) (South Africa) Dylan Mostert (2) (South Africa) Albert Venter (2)
- Order of Merit: (South Africa) Ockie Strydom
- Rookie of the Year: (South Africa) Casey Jarvis

The 2022–23 Sunshine Tour was the 52nd season of the Sunshine Tour (formerly the Southern Africa Tour), the main professional golf tour in South Africa since it was formed in 1971.

== Changes for 2022–23 ==
The season marked the return of the FBC Zim Open, having not been played since 2018.

In May 2022, the tour announced that the Order of Merit would be rebranded as the Luno Order of Merit, calculated using a points-based system rather than money earned.

== Schedule ==
The following table lists official events during the 2022–23 season.

Date	Tournament	Location	Purse (R)	Winner (Note: The number in brackets after each winner's name is the number of Sunshine Tour events they had won up to and including that tournament. This information is only shown for Sunshine Tour members.)	OWGR points	Other tours (Note: CHA − Challenge Tour; EUR − European Tour.)	Notes
15 May	Lombard Insurance Classic	Western Cape	1,200,000	(South Africa) Herman Loubser (1)	7		
22 May	FBC Zim Open	Zimbabwe	2,000,000	(South Africa) Albert Venter (1)	14		
29 May	Sishen Classic	Northern Cape	3,000,000	(South Africa) Deon Germishuys (1)	14		New tournament
3 Jun	SunBet Challenge (Sun City)	North West	1,000,000	(South Africa) Rourke van der Spuy (3)	4		
12 Jun	Kit Kat Group Pro-Am	Gauteng	1,000,000	(South Africa) Dylan Mostert (1)	4		Pro-Am
30 Jul	FNB Eswatini Nkonyeni Challenge	Eswatini	1,000,000	(South Africa) Jaco Prinsloo (6)	4		New tournament (Note: Tournament's debut delayed from 2020.)
6 Aug	Vodacom Origins of Golf at De Zalze	Western Cape	1,150,000	(South Africa) George Coetzee (13)	4		
13 Aug	Bain's Whisky Ubunye Championship	Gauteng	1,200,000	(South Africa) Merrick Bremner (8) and (South Africa) Martin Rohwer (3)	n/a		New team event
19 Aug	SunBet Challenge (Time Square Casino)	Gauteng	1,000,000	(South Africa) Albert Venter (2)	2.43		
27 Aug	Vodacom Origins of Golf at Highland Gate	Mpumalanga	1,150,000	(South Africa) Anthony Michael (1)	2.01		
10 Sep	Gary & Vivienne Player Challenge	KwaZulu-Natal	1,200,000	(South Africa) Jaco van Zyl (15)	2.32		New tournament
17 Sep	Vodacom Origins of Golf at San Lameer	KwaZulu-Natal	1,150,000	(South Africa) Wynand Dingle (1)	2.29		
23 Sep	SunBet Challenge (Wild Coast Sun)	Western Cape	1,000,000	(South Africa) M. J. Viljoen (2)	1.97		
1 Oct	Vodacom Origins of Golf at St Francis	Eastern Cape	1,150,000	(South Africa) Ruan Korb (2)	1.74		
9 Oct	Fortress Invitational	Gauteng	1,500,000	(South Africa) Pieter Moolman (1)	2.40		New tournament
15 Oct	Blue Label Challenge	North West	2,500,000	(Portugal) Stephen Ferreira (1)	2.19		Pro-Am
21 Oct	SunBet Challenge (Sun Sibaya)	KwaZulu-Natal	1,000,000	(South Africa) Dylan Naidoo (1)	1.37		
30 Oct	Vodacom Origins of Golf Final	Western Cape	1,500,000	(South Africa) Combrinck Smit (1)	1.88		
6 Nov	PGA Championship	Eastern Cape	1,200,000	(South Africa) George Coetzee (14)	2.37		
27 Nov	Joburg Open	Gauteng	17,500,000	(England) Dan Bradbury (n/a)	9.24	EUR	
4 Dec	Investec South African Open Championship	Gauteng	US$1,500,000	(South Africa) Thriston Lawrence (3)	12.12	EUR	
11 Dec	Alfred Dunhill Championship	Mpumalanga	€1,500,000	(South Africa) Ockie Strydom (2)	14.59	EUR	
18 Dec	AfrAsia Bank Mauritius Open	Mauritius	€1,000,000	(France) Antoine Rozner (n/a)	8.60	EUR	
5 Feb	Bain's Whisky Cape Town Open	Western Cape	US$350,000	(Zimbabwe) Benjamin Follett-Smith (2)	5.67	CHA	
12 Feb	Dimension Data Pro-Am	Western Cape	7,000,000	(South Africa) Oliver Bekker (8)	6.05	CHA	Pro-Am
19 Feb	SDC Open	Limpopo	US$350,000	(South Africa) J. J. Senekal (3)	5.21	CHA	
26 Feb	Nelson Mandela Bay Championship	Eastern Cape	US$350,000	(South Africa) Dylan Mostert (2)	5.25	CHA	New tournament
11 Mar	Mediclinic Invitational	Gauteng	2,000,000	(South Africa) Stefan Wears-Taylor (1)	2.34		New tournament
19 Mar	SDC Championship	Eastern Cape	US$1,500,000	(England) Matthew Baldwin (n/a)	14.81	EUR	New tournament
26 Mar	Jonsson Workwear Open	Gauteng	US$1,500,000	(Germany) Nick Bachem (n/a)	13.85	EUR	
2 Apr	Limpopo Championship	Limpopo	2,000,000	(South Africa) Ryan van Velzen (1)	2.51		
16 Apr	Stella Artois Players Championship	Gauteng	2,000,000	(South Africa) Kyle Barker (1)	2.75		
23 Apr	The Tour Championship	Gauteng	2,000,000	(South Africa) Jaco Ahlers (11)	2.88		Tour Championship

=== Unofficial events ===
The following events were sanctioned by the Sunshine Tour, but did not carry official money, nor were wins official.

Date	Tournament	Location	Purse (R)	Winner	OWGR points	Other tours	Notes
13 Nov	Nedbank Golf Challenge	North West	US$6,000,000	(England) Tommy Fleetwood	14.92	EUR	Limited-field event
21 Apr	Altron Vusi Ngubeni Tournament	Gauteng	100,000	(South Africa) Robin Williams	n/a		

== Order of Merit ==
The Order of Merit was titled as the Luno Order of Merit and was based on tournament results during the season, calculated using a points-based system. The top three players on the Order of Merit (not otherwise exempt) earned status to play on the 2024 European Tour (DP World Tour).

Position	Player	Points	Status earned
1	(South Africa) Ockie Strydom	3,336	Already exempt (Note: Strydom and Lawrence were already exempt due to being tournament winners on the 2023 European Tour (DP World Tour).)
2	(South Africa) Jaco Prinsloo	2,327	Promoted to European Tour
3	(South Africa) Thriston Lawrence	2,318	Already exempt
4	(South Africa) Oliver Bekker	2,117	Promoted to European Tour
5	(South Africa) Dylan Mostert	1,912	Promoted to European Tour

== Awards ==
Award	Winner	Ref.
Rookie of the Year (Bobby Locke Trophy)	(South Africa) Casey Jarvis	

== See also ==
- 2022 Big Easy Tour
