= 2022 Challenge Tour =

Golf tour season

2022 Challenge Tour season
- Duration: 9 February 2022 – 6 November 2022
- Number of official events: 28 (Note: A further two tournaments were scheduled but were either cancelled or otherwise removed from the schedule.)
- Most wins: (England) Nathan Kimsey (2) (Germany) Alexander Knappe (2) (South Africa) J. C. Ritchie (2)
- Rankings: (England) Nathan Kimsey

The 2022 Challenge Tour was the 34th season of the Challenge Tour, the official development tour to the European Tour.

== Schedule ==
The following table lists official events during the 2022 season.

Date	Tournament	Host country	Purse (€)	Winner (Note: The number in brackets after each winner's name is the number of Challenge Tour events they had won up to and including that tournament. This information is only shown for Challenge Tour members. It is rare for someone to accumulate many wins on the Challenge Tour as success at this level usually leads to promotion to the European Tour.)	OWGR points	Other tours (Note: AFR − Sunshine Tour; CHN − China Tour.)	Notes
13 Feb	Dimension Data Pro-Am	South Africa	R6,000,000	(Germany) Alexander Knappe (3)	13	AFR	Pro-Am
20 Feb	Bain's Whisky Cape Town Open	South Africa	US$250,000	(South Africa) J. C. Ritchie (3)	13	AFR	
27 Feb	Jonsson Workwear Open	South Africa	US$250,000	(South Africa) J. C. Ritchie (4)	13	AFR	New tournament
6 Mar	Mangaung Open	South Africa	US$250,000	(Denmark) Oliver Hundebøll (1)	13	AFR	New tournament
27 Mar	SDC Open	South Africa	US$250,000	(France) Clément Sordet (5)	13	AFR	New tournament
3 Apr	Limpopo Championship	South Africa	US$250,000	(Poland) Mateusz Gradecki (1)	13	AFR	
~~10 Apr~~	Mount Kilamanjaro Klassic	Tanzania	–	Removed	–	AFR	New tournament
22 May	Challenge de España	Spain	250,000	(Sweden) Jens Dantorp (3)	12		
29 May	Farmfoods Scottish Challenge	Scotland	£230,000	(Spain) Javier Sainz (1)	12		
5 Jun	D+D Real Czech Challenge	Czech Republic	260,000	(Denmark) Nicolai Kristensen (1)	12		
12 Jun	Empordà Challenge	Spain	250,000	(Scotland) Liam Johnston (3)	12		
19 Jun	Kaskáda Golf Challenge	Czech Republic	260,000	(Denmark) Martin Simonsen (1)	12		
26 Jun	Blot Open de Bretagne	France	250,000	(England) Alfie Plant (2)	12		
3 Jul	Italian Challenge Open	Italy	350,000	(Norway) Kristian Krogh Johannessen (1)	12		
10 Jul	Le Vaudreuil Golf Challenge	France	260,000	(England) Nathan Kimsey (1)	12		
17 Jul	Euram Bank Open	Austria	250,000	(Germany) Marc Hammer (1)	12		
24 Jul	Big Green Egg German Challenge	Germany	250,000	(Spain) Alejandro del Rey (1)	12		
31 Jul	Irish Challenge	Ireland	250,000	(England) Todd Clements (1)	12		
7 Aug	Vierumäki Finnish Challenge	Finland	250,000	(Germany) Velten Meyer (1)	12		
14 Aug	Frederikshavn Challenge	Denmark	250,000	(Germany) Freddy Schott (1)	3.83		
21 Aug	Dormy Open	Sweden	250,000	(Spain) Emilio Cuartero (2)	5.47		
28 Aug	Indoor Golf Group Challenge	Sweden	250,000	(Sweden) Mikael Lindberg (1)	5.28		New tournament
4 Sep	B-NL Challenge Trophy	Belgium	250,000	(Germany) Alexander Knappe (4)	4.98		
18 Sep	Open de Portugal	Portugal	250,000	(France) Pierre Pineau (1)	5.57		
25 Sep	Swiss Challenge	France	250,000	(New Zealand) Daniel Hillier (2)	5.14		
2 Oct	Hopps Open de Provence	France	250,000	(Sweden) Joel Sjöholm (2)	5.18		
9 Oct	British Challenge	England	£230,000	(Scotland) Euan Walker (1)	5.05		
16 Oct	English Trophy	England	£230,000	(Switzerland) Jeremy Freiburghaus (1)	5.10		New tournament
~~23 Oct~~	Foshan Open	China	–	Cancelled	–	CHN	
6 Nov	Rolex Challenge Tour Grand Final	Spain	500,000	(England) Nathan Kimsey (2)	3.36		Tour Championship

== Rankings ==
The rankings were titled as the Road to Mallorca and were based on tournament results during the season, calculated using a points-based system. The top 20 players on the rankings earned status to play on the 2023 European Tour (DP World Tour).

Rank	Player	Points
1	(England) Nathan Kimsey	208,918
2	(Switzerland) Jeremy Freiburghaus	160,025
3	(Germany) Alexander Knappe	146,052
4	(South Africa) J. C. Ritchie	141,286
5	(Sweden) Mikael Lindberg	139,848
