= Peter Karmis =

South African professional golfer (born 1981)

Personal information
- Nationality: South Africa; Greece (since July 2018)
- Born: 10 June 1981 (age 45) Springbok, South Africa
- Height: 1.68 m (5 ft 6 in)
- Weight: 64 kg (141 lb; 10.1 st)

Career
- Sport: Golf
- College: Purdue University
- Turned professional: 2004
- Current tour: Sunshine Tour
- Former tours: Japan Golf Tour; Asian Tour; Japan Challenge Tour
- Professional wins: 9

Number of wins by tour
- Asian Tour: 1
- Sunshine Tour: 7
- Other: 1

Peter Karmis (born 10 June 1981) is a Greek-South African professional golfer. Since July 2018, he has played under the Greek flag. In 2009 he became the first player in Sunshine Tour history to record a round of 59.

== Career ==
Karmis played college golf at Purdue University.

Karmis plays on the Sunshine Tour where he has won five times. He won the Lombard Insurance Classic in 2007 and 2009, the Sun Sibaya Challenge in 2016. In 2017, he won the Investec Royal Swazi Open and the Sun City Challenge.

Karmis also played on the Asian Tour from 2010 to 2012, highlighted by winning the Handa Singapore Classic in 2010.

== Professional wins (9) ==
=== Asian Tour wins (1) ===
No.	Date	Tournament	Winning score	Margin of victory	Runner-up
1	12 Sep 2010	Handa Singapore Classic	−21 (63-63-70-71=267)	2 strokes	(South Africa) Jbe' Kruger

=== Sunshine Tour wins (7) ===
No.	Date	Tournament	Winning score	Margin of victory	Runner-up
1	10 Jun 2007	Lombard Insurance Classic	−16 (64-72-64=200)	1 stroke	(Zimbabwe) Tongoona Charamba
2	7 Jun 2009	Lombard Insurance Classic (2)	−18 (65-74-59=198)	4 strokes	(South Africa) Jaco van Zyl
3	28 Oct 2016	Sun Sibaya Challenge	−18 (63-68-67=198)	3 strokes	(South Africa) Oliver Bekker
4	6 May 2017	Investec Royal Swazi Open	49 pts (12-6-22-9=49)	1 point	(United States) Zack Byrd
5	4 Aug 2017	Sun City Challenge	−6 (71-69-70=210)	Playoff	(South Africa) Jake Roos
6	1 Sep 2018	Vodacom Origins of Golf at Selborne Park	−14 (69-65-68=202)	4 strokes	(South Africa) Jacques Blaauw
7	29 Jul 2023	FNB Eswatini Challenge	−10 (66-70-70=206)	1 stroke	(Zimbabwe) Stuart Krog

Sunshine Tour playoff record (1–1)

No.	Year	Tournament	Opponent	Result
1	2011	Vodacom Origins of Golf at Simola	(South Africa) Jean Hugo	Lost to birdie on first extra hole
2	2017	Sun City Challenge	(South Africa) Jake Roos	Won with par on first extra hole

=== Japan Challenge Tour wins (1) ===
No.	Date	Tournament	Winning score	Margin of victory	Runners-up
1	27 Sep 2019	Elite Grips Challenge	−11 (75-68-62=205)	1 stroke	(Japan) Mikiya Akutsu, (Thailand) Arnond Vongvanij

== Team appearances ==
Professional

- World Cup (representing Greece): 2018

== See also ==
- Lowest rounds of golf
