= Oliver Bekker =

South African professional golfer (born 1984)

Personal information
- Nationality: South Africa
- Born: 11 December 1984 (age 41) Pretoria, South Africa
- Height: 6 ft 2 in (1.88 m)
- Weight: 198 lb (90 kg; 14.1 st)

Career
- Sport: Golf
- Turned professional: 2008
- Current tours: PGA Tour of Australasia; Sunshine Tour; Asian Tour
- Former tours: European Tour; Web.com Tour; Challenge Tour; LIV Golf
- Professional wins: 10
- Highest ranking: 84 (15 May 2022) (as of 25 October 2026)

Number of wins by tour
- Sunshine Tour: 9
- PGA Tour of Australasia: 1
- Challenge Tour: 2

Best results in major championships
- Masters Tournament: DNP
- PGA Championship: CUT: 2022
- U.S. Open: CUT: 2017
- The Open Championship: DNP

Achievements and awards
- Sunshine Tour Players' Player of the Year: 2017–18

Oliver Bekker (born 11 December 1984) is a South African professional golfer.

== Professional career ==
Bekker plays on the Sunshine Tour where he has won seven times. He won the 2011 Northern Cape Classic, the 2012 Dimension Data Pro-Am, the 2013 Telkom PGA Pro-Am and the 2016 Sun City Challenge. He won three times in 2017, the Zambia Sugar Open, the Lombard Insurance Classic, and the Sun Wild Coast Sun Challenge.

In April 2021, Bekker lost in a four-man playoff at the Limpopo Championship. In December, he finished second in the SA Open Championship; one shot behind Daniel van Tonder. At the end of the season he graduated to the European Tour for 2022 via the Challenge Tour rankings.

In May 2022, Bekker broke into the top 100 of the Official World Golf Ranking for the first time after losing out in a playoff for the Catalunya Championship. In June 2022, he played in the inaugural LIV Golf Invitational Series event. Along with several other players, he was subsequently fined by the European Tour and suspended from three PGA Tour co-sanctioned events.

In February 2023, Bekker won the Dimension Data Pro-Am for the second time in his career. The event was co-sanctioned between the Challenge Tour and the Sunshine Tour.

In October 2025, Bekker played on the PGA Tour of Australasia with the prospect of moving to Australia. He won the Nexus Advisernet Bowra & O'Dea WA Open in his second start of the 2025–26 season.

== Professional wins (10) ==
=== Sunshine Tour wins (9) ===
| No. | Date | Tournament | Winning score | Margin of victory | Runner(s)-up |
|---|---|---|---|---|---|
| 1 | 17 Sep 2011 | Northern Cape Classic | −15 (66-64-68=198) | 5 strokes | (South Africa) Bryce Easton |
| 2 | 19 Feb 2012 | Dimension Data Pro-Am | −13 (65-70-71-70=276) | 2 strokes | (South Africa) Thomas Aiken, (South Africa) Tyrone Ferreira |
| 3 | 25 Jan 2013 | Telkom PGA Pro-Am | −20 (66-64-66=196) | 2 strokes | (South Africa) PH McIntyre, (South Africa) Ryan Strauss |
| 4 | 6 Aug 2016 | Sun City Challenge | −6 (74-67-69=210) | 1 stroke | (South Africa) Shaun Norris |
| 5 | 30 Apr 2017 | Zambia Sugar Open | −19 (68-66-67-72=273) | 2 strokes | (South Africa) Jared Harvey |
| 6 | 21 May 2017 | Lombard Insurance Classic | −19 (63-70-64=197) | Playoff | (South Africa) Justin Harding |
| 7 | 25 Aug 2017 | Sun Wild Coast Sun Challenge | −11 (69-65-65=199) | 3 strokes | (South Africa) Tyrone Ferreira, (South Africa) Alex Haindl, (South Africa) Ockie Strydom |
| 8 | 12 Feb 2023 | Dimension Data Pro-Am^{1} (2) | −22 (67-68-64-68=267) | 4 strokes | (Sweden) Adam Blommé |
| 9 | 22 Feb 2026 | Jonsson Workwear Durban Open^{1} | −16 (65-68-67=200) (Note: Shortened to 54 holes due to weather.) | 2 strokes | (Sweden) Christofer Blomstrand |

^{1}Co-sanctioned by the Challenge Tour

Sunshine Tour playoff record (1–1)

| No. | Year | Tournament | Opponent(s) | Result |
|---|---|---|---|---|
| 1 | 2017 | Lombard Insurance Classic | (South Africa) Justin Harding | Won with par on first extra hole |
| 2 | 2021 | Limpopo Championship | (South Africa) Hennie du Plessis, (South Africa) Brandon Stone, (South Africa) Daniel van Tonder | Stone won with birdie on first extra hole |

=== PGA Tour of Australasia wins (1) ===
| No. | Date | Tournament | Winning score | Margin of victory | Runner-up |
|---|---|---|---|---|---|
| 1 | 19 Oct 2025 | Nexus Advisernet Bowra & O'Dea WA Open | −7 (73-71-68-69=281) | 1 stroke | (Australia) Cameron John |

=== Challenge Tour wins (2) ===
| No. | Date | Tournament | Winning score | Margin of victory | Runner-up |
|---|---|---|---|---|---|
| 1 | 12 Feb 2023 | Dimension Data Pro-Am^{1} | −22 (67-68-64-68=267) | 4 strokes | (Sweden) Adam Blommé |
| 2 | 22 Feb 2026 | Jonsson Workwear Durban Open^{1} | −16 (65-68-67=200) | 2 strokes | (Sweden) Christofer Blomstrand |

^{1}Co-sanctioned by the Sunshine Tour

Challenge Tour playoff record (0–1)

| No. | Year | Tournament | Opponents | Result |
|---|---|---|---|---|
| 1 | 2021 | Limpopo Championship | (South Africa) Hennie du Plessis, (South Africa) Brandon Stone, (South Africa) Daniel van Tonder | Stone won with birdie on first extra hole |

== Playoff record ==
European Tour playoff record (0–1)

| No. | Year | Tournament | Opponent | Result |
|---|---|---|---|---|
| 1 | 2022 | Catalunya Championship | (Spain) Adri Arnaus | Lost to par on sixth extra hole |

== Results in major championships ==
Results not in chronological order in 2020.

| Tournament | 2017 | 2018 |
|---|---|---|
| Masters Tournament | | |
| U.S. Open | CUT | |
| The Open Championship | | |
| PGA Championship | | |

| Tournament | 2019 | 2020 | 2021 | 2022 |
|---|---|---|---|---|
| Masters Tournament | | | | |
| PGA Championship | | | | CUT |
| U.S. Open | | | | |
| The Open Championship | | NT | | |

CUT = missed the halfway cut
NT = No tournament due to COVID-19 pandemic

== Results in World Golf Championships ==
| Tournament | 2012 | 2013 | 2014 | 2015 | 2016 | 2017 | 2018 |
|---|---|---|---|---|---|---|---|
| Match Play | | | | | | | |
| Championship | | | | | | | |
| Invitational | 75 | | | | | | |
| Champions | | | | | | | T69 |

Did not play

"T" = Tied

== See also ==
- 2021 Challenge Tour graduates
