= Jaco Ahlers =

South African professional golfer

Personal information
- Nationality: South Africa
- Born: 19 November 1982 (age 43)
- Height: 6 ft 0 in (1.83 m)
- Weight: 230 lb (100 kg; 16 st)

Career
- Sport: Golf
- Turned professional: 2006
- Current tours: Asian Tour; Sunshine Tour
- Former tours: European Tour; PGA Tour Canada
- Professional wins: 13

Number of wins by tour
- Asian Tour: 1
- Sunshine Tour: 12

Best results in major championships
- Masters Tournament: DNP
- PGA Championship: DNP
- U.S. Open: DNP
- The Open Championship: CUT: 2009, 2021

Jaco Ahlers (born 19 November 1982) is a South African professional golfer who plays on the Sunshine Tour and the Asian Tour.

== Professional career ==
Ahlers has played on the Sunshine Tour since 2006. He has won ten tournaments including the 2009 Vodacom Business Origins of Golf Tour at Erinvale, the 2014 Lion of Africa Cape Town Open, the 2015 Investec Cup, the 2016 KCM Zambia Open (winning all four in sudden-death playoffs), the 2016 Sun Wild Coast Sun Challenge, the 2016 Vodacom Origins of Golf (Euphoria), the 2018 Dimension Data Pro-Am and the 2019 King's Cup and Vodacom Origins (Selborne).

Ahlers also played on the Asian Tour in 2011 and PGA Tour Canada in 2013.

== Professional wins (13) ==
=== Asian Tour wins (1) ===
No.	Date	Tournament	Winning score	Margin of victory	Runner-up
1	1 Oct 2023	Mercuries Taiwan Masters^{1}	−4 (69-74-72-69=284)	2 strokes	(India) S. Chikkarangappa

^{1}Co-sanctioned by the Taiwan PGA Tour

=== Sunshine Tour wins (12) ===
Legend
Tour Championships (1)
Other Sunshine Tour (11)

No.	Date	Tournament	Winning score	Margin of victory	Runner(s)-up
1	13 Aug 2009	Vodacom Origins of Golf at Erinvale	−9 (64-71=135) (Note: Shortened to 36 holes due to weather.)	Playoff	(South Africa) Ulrich van den Berg
2	30 Nov 2014	Lion of Africa Cape Town Open	−12 (71-69-68-68=276)	Playoff	(England) Ross McGowan, (South Africa) Hennie Otto
3	22 Mar 2015	Investec Cup	−9 (72-73-68-66=279)	Playoff	(South Africa) Jaco van Zyl
4	5 Jun 2016	KCM Zambia Open	−17 (68-65-67-71=271)	Playoff	(South Africa) Jacques Blaauw
5	26 Aug 2016	Sun Wild Coast Sun Challenge	−17 (61-66-66=193)	3 strokes	(South Africa) Ruan de Smidt, (South Africa) Daniel van Tonder
6	22 Oct 2016	Vodacom Origins of Golf (2) at Euphoria	−9 (67-69-71=207)	3 strokes	(South Africa) Jacques Kruyswijk
7	18 Feb 2018	Dimension Data Pro-Am	−20 (71-68-66-64=269)	3 strokes	(South Africa) Jean-Paul Strydom
8	7 Sep 2019	King's Cup	−19 (66-65-66=197)	3 strokes	(South Africa) Daniel Greene
9	19 Oct 2019	Vodacom Origins of Golf (3) at Selborne Park	−15 (64-70-67=201)	2 strokes	(South Africa) Ockie Strydom
10	24 Apr 2022	Stella Artois Players Championship	−18 (64-67-69-66=266)	Playoff	(South Africa) Ockie Strydom
11	23 Apr 2023	The Tour Championship	−17 (66-65-69-71=271)	4 strokes	(South Africa) Casey Jarvis
12	26 Jul 2024	SunBet Challenge (Wild Coast)	−13 (64-64-69=197)	1 stroke	(South Africa) Brandon Stone

Sunshine Tour playoff record (5–2)

No.	Year	Tournament	Opponent(s)	Result
1	2009	Vodacom Origins of Golf at Erinvale	(South Africa) Ulrich van den Berg	
2	2014	Vodacom Origins of Golf at Wild Coast	(South Africa) Louis de Jager, (South Africa) Haydn Porteous	de Jager won with par on first extra hole
3	2014	Lion of Africa Cape Town Open	(England) Ross McGowan, (South Africa) Hennie Otto	Won with par on fourth extra hole Otto eliminated by par on first hole
4	2015	Investec Cup	(South Africa) Jaco van Zyl	Won with par on third extra hole
5	2016	KCM Zambia Open	(South Africa) Jacques Blaauw	Won with par on second extra hole
6	2018	Zanaco Masters	(South Africa) Andre de Decker, (South Africa) Alex Haindl, (South Africa) J. J. Senekal	Senekal won with eagle on fourth extra hole Ahlers and Haindl eliminated by birdie on first hole
7	2022	Stella Artois Players Championship	(South Africa) Ockie Strydom	Won with birdie on second extra hole

== Results in major championships ==
Results not in chronological order in 2020.

Tournament	2009	2010	2011	2012	2013	2014	2015	2016	2017	2018
Masters Tournament										
U.S. Open										
The Open Championship	CUT									
PGA Championship										

Tournament	2019	2020	2021
Masters Tournament			
PGA Championship			
U.S. Open			
The Open Championship		NT	CUT

Did not play

CUT = missed the half-way cut
NT = No tournament due to COVID-19 pandemic

== Results in World Golf Championships ==
Tournament	2018
Championship	
Match Play	
Invitational	71
Champions	

Did not play

== See also ==
- 2016 European Tour Qualifying School graduates
