= Madalitso Muthiya =

Zambian golfer (born 1983)

Personal information
- Nationality: Zambia
- Born: 8 February 1983 (age 43) Kitwe, Zambia

Career
- Sport: Golf
- College: University of New Mexico
- Turned professional: 2005
- Current tour: Sunshine Tour
- Former tours: Nationwide Tour; Canadian Tour
- Professional wins: 2

Number of wins by tour
- Sunshine Tour: 1
- Other: 1

Best results in major championships
- Masters Tournament: DNP
- PGA Championship: DNP
- U.S. Open: CUT: 2006
- The Open Championship: DNP

Madalitso Muthiya (born 8 February 1983) is a Zambian professional golfer.

== Early life and amateur career ==
Muthiya took up golf at the age of six and at fifteen he caught the attention of Zambian president Frederick Chiluba, who asked an American, James Roth, to assist Muthiya in securing an athletic scholarship to a university. Roth arranged for Muthiya to play a junior tournament in the United States, the 1999 Nolan Henke/Patty Berg Junior Masters in Fort Myers, Florida. Muthiya won in the 16- to 18-year-old age group. He went on to play college golf at the University of New Mexico

== Professional career ==
In 2005, Muthiya turned professional. In 2006, he had many highlights. In March, he finished second at the Zambia Open. He joined the Canadian Tour later in the year. In the summer he also became the first Zambian and black African to play in the U.S. Open. He missed the cut at the 2006 U.S. Open.

He played on the Nationwide Tour in 2010 where his best finish was T-7 at the Mylan Classic.

In July 2016, he won his first Sunshine Tour title in a Vodacom Origins of Golf Tour event, the first Zambian to win on the Sunshine Tour and only the fourth black African. In 2018, he won the Ivory Coast Open with a score of 18-under-par, setting the course record.

== Professional wins (2) ==
=== Sunshine Tour wins (1) ===
No.	Date	Tournament	Winning score	Margin of victory	Runners-up
1	30 Jul 2016	Vodacom Origins of Golf at Wild Coast Sun	−11 (63-70-66=199)	2 strokes	(South Africa) Hennie du Plessis, (South Africa) Ockie Strydom

=== Safari Tour wins (1) ===
No.	Date	Tournament	Winning score	Margin of victory	Runner-up
1	14 Sep 2019	Castle Lite Uganda Open	−9 (72-66-69-72=279)	4 strokes	(Zimbabwe) Tongoona Charamba

== Results in major championships ==
Tournament	2006
U.S. Open	CUT

CUT = missed the half-way cut
Note: Muthiya only played in the U.S. Open.
