= 2015 MENA Golf Tour =

Golf tour season

2015 MENA Golf Tour season
- Duration: 4 April 2015 – 11 November 2015
- Number of official events: 11
- Order of Merit: (South Africa) Thriston Lawrence

The 2015 MENA Golf Tour was the fifth season of the MENA Golf Tour.

== Schedule ==
The following table lists official events during the 2015 season.

Date	Tournament	Host country	Purse (US$)	Winner (Note: The number in brackets after each winner's name is the number of MENA Golf Tour events they had won up to and including that tournament.)
6 Apr	Royal Golf Dar Es Salam Open	Morocco	50,000	(England) Ross McGowan (2)
11 Apr	Royal Golf D'Anfa Open	Morocco	50,000	(Scotland) Paul Doherty (1)
16 Sep	Dubai Creek Open	UAE	50,000	(England) Jake Shepherd (2)
23 Sep	Ascorp Golf Citizen Abu Dhabi Open	UAE	50,000	(England) Gary King (1)
30 Sep	Shaikh Maktoum Dubai Open	UAE	50,000	(Sweden) Per Barth (1)
7 Oct	American Express Dirab Golf Championship	Saudi Arabia	50,000	(Spain) Gabriel Cañizares (1)
14 Oct	Golf Citizen Classic	UAE	30,000	(Scotland) Clarke Lutton (1)
21 Oct	Muscat Hills Golf Citizen Championship	Oman	30,000	(Sweden) Christofer Blomstrand (1)
28 Oct	Ghala Open	Oman	50,000	(England) Lee Corfield (4)
4 Nov	Ras Al Khaimah Classic	UAE	50,000	(South Africa) Thriston Lawrence (1)
11 Nov	MENA Golf Tour Championship	UAE	75,000	(England) Scott Campbell (1)

== Order of Merit ==
The Order of Merit was based on prize money won during the season, calculated in U.S. dollars.

Position	Player	Prize money ($)
1	(South Africa) Thriston Lawrence	27,679
2	(Spain) Gabriel Cañizares	20,379
3	(Scotland) Paul Doherty	19,135
4	(England) Lee Corfield	19,079
5	(England) Stuart Archibald	19,038
