= AfrAsia Bank Mauritius Open =

Golf tournament

Coordinates: 20.503°S 57.408°E

Tournament information
- Location: Bel Ombre, Mauritius
- Established: 2015
- Courses: Heritage Golf Club (La Réserve Golf Links)
- Par: 72
- Length: 7,357 yards (6,727 m)
- Tours: European Tour; Asian Tour; Sunshine Tour
- Format: Stroke play
- Prize fund: US$1,200,000
- Month played: December

Tournament record score
- Aggregate: 266 Ryan Gerard (2025); 266 Jayden Schaper (2025)
- To par: −22 as above

Current champion
- (South Africa) Jayden Schaper

Location map
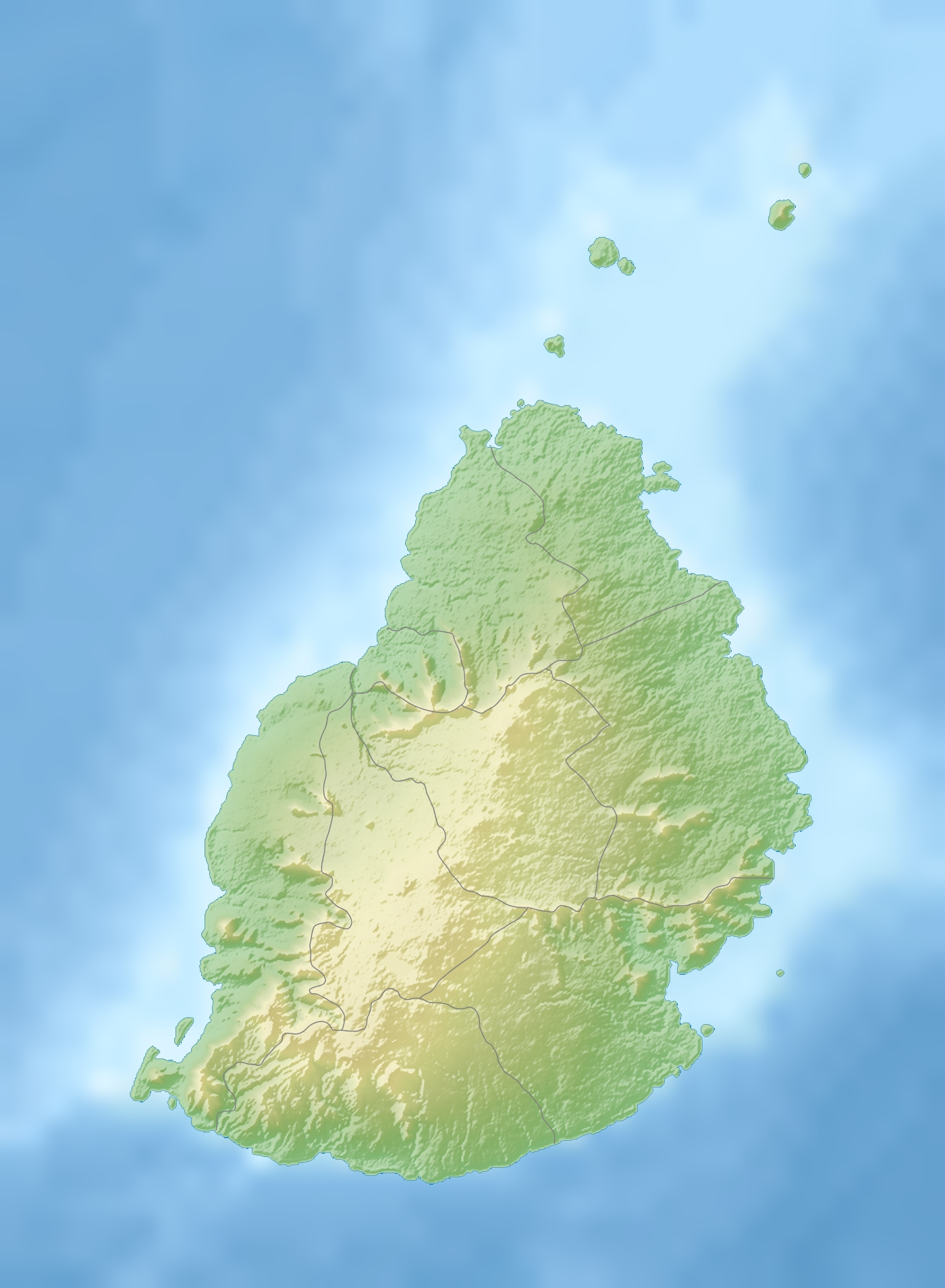
- Location in Mauritius

The AfrAsia Bank Mauritius Open is a men's professional golf tournament co-sanctioned by the European Tour and Sunshine Tour, and formerly by the Asian Tour. It began in 2015 and was initially played at Heritage Golf Club in Bel-Ombre, Mauritius. In 2016 and 2018, the tournament was held at Anahita Golf Club, returning to Heritage Golf Club in 2017 and in 2019. The 2015 and 2016 events were played in May but in 2017 it was moved to December and was part of the 2018 European Tour schedule.

== History ==
In the second round of the inaugural tournament in 2015, Spain's Javier Colomo made a hole-in-one the par-4 9th hole, the first par-four ace in the history of all three co-sanctioning tours. It was his final hole of the day, and he had needed birdie or better to make the cut.

In August 2022, it was confirmed that the tournament would return that December after a two-year hiatus.

Heritage Golf Club in Bel-Ombre opened a new course, La Réserve Golf Links in December 2023. The course was co-designed by Peter Matkovich, as well as 2010 Open Championship winner Louis Oosthuizen. Oosthuizen went on to win the inaugural event at La Réserve in 2023.

== Winners ==
| Year | Tours (Note: AFR − Sunshine Tour; ASA − Asian Tour; EUR − European Tour.) | Winner | Score | To par | Margin of victory | Runner(s)-up | Venue |
|---|---|---|---|---|---|---|---|
| 2025 | AFR, EUR | (South Africa) Jayden Schaper | 266 | −22 | Playoff | (United States) Ryan Gerard | Heritage (La Réserve) |
| 2024 | AFR, EUR | (England) John Parry | 274 | −14 | 2 strokes | (South Africa) Christo Lamprecht (South Africa) Dylan Naidoo | Mont Choisy |
| 2023 | AFR, EUR | (South Africa) Louis Oosthuizen | 271 | −17 | 2 strokes | (England) Laurie Canter | Heritage (La Réserve) |
| 2022 | AFR, EUR | (France) Antoine Rozner | 269 | −19 | 5 strokes | (Spain) Alfredo García-Heredia | Mont Choisy |
2020–21: No tournament
| 2019 | AFR, ASA, EUR | (Denmark) Rasmus Højgaard | 269 | −19 | Playoff | (Italy) Renato Paratore (France) Antoine Rozner | Heritage (Le Château) |
| 2018 | AFR, ASA, EUR | (United States) Kurt Kitayama | 268 | −20 | 2 strokes | (India) S. Chikkarangappa (France) Matthieu Pavon | Anahita |
| 2017 | AFR, ASA, EUR | (South Africa) Dylan Frittelli | 268 | −16 | Playoff | (India) Arjun Atwal | Heritage (Le Château) |
| 2016 | AFR, ASA, EUR | (South Korea) Wang Jeung-hun | 282 | −6 | 1 stroke | (Bangladesh) Siddikur Rahman | Anahita |
| 2015 | AFR, ASA, EUR | (South Africa) George Coetzee | 271 | −13 | Playoff | (Denmark) Thorbjørn Olesen | Heritage (Le Château) |

== See also ==
- Open golf tournament
