= Ross McGowan =

English professional golfer

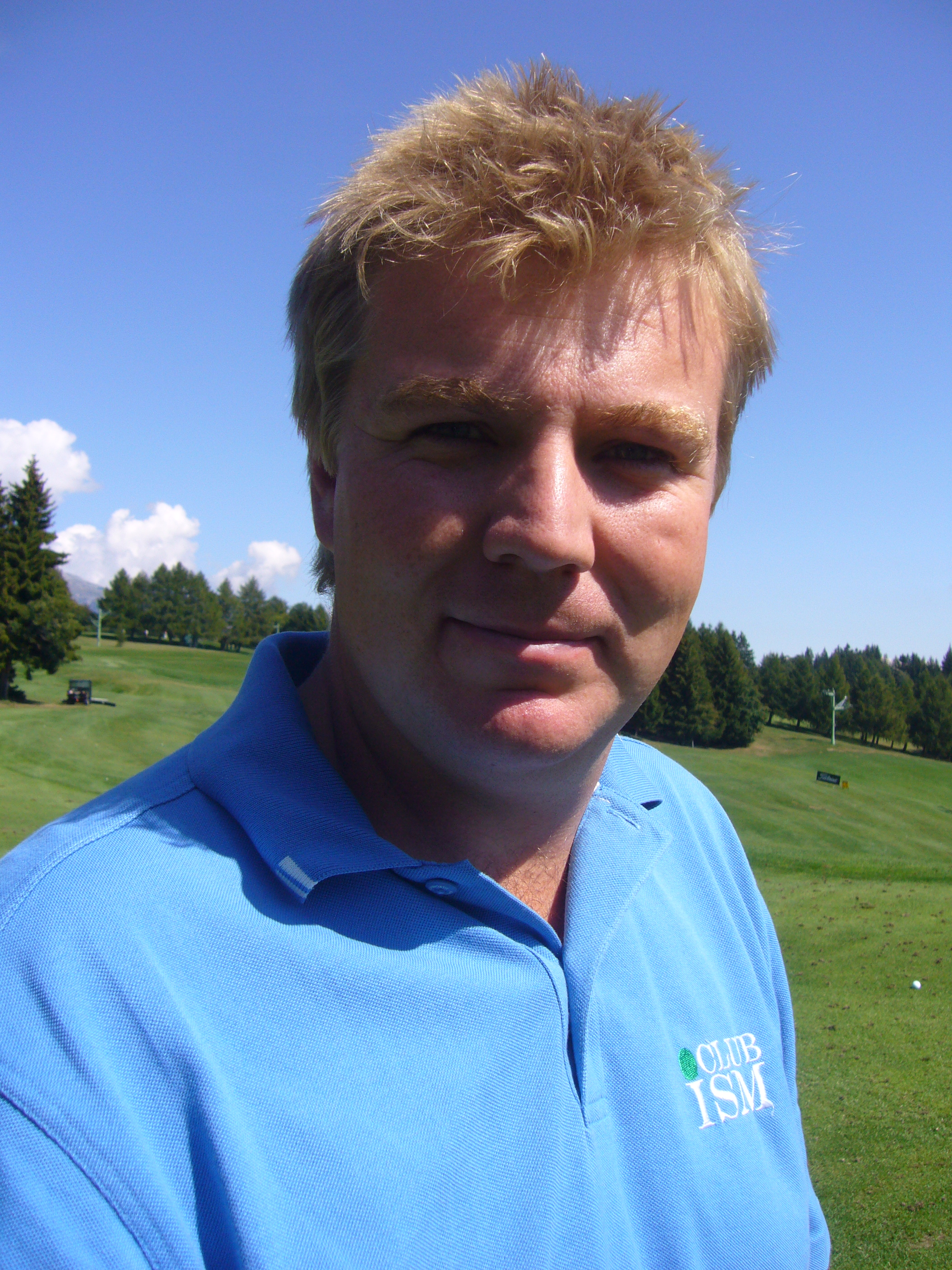

Personal information
- Full name: Ross Ian Thomas McGowan
- Nationality: England
- Born: 23 April 1982 (age 44) Basildon, Essex, England
- Height: 5 ft 11 in (1.80 m)
- Weight: 190 lb (86 kg; 14 st)

Career
- Sport: Golf
- College: University of Tennessee
- Turned professional: 2006
- Current tour: Clutch Pro Tour
- Former tours: European Tour; Challenge Tour; Sunshine Tour
- Professional wins: 8
- Highest ranking: 63 (21 February 2010)

Number of wins by tour
- European Tour: 2
- Sunshine Tour: 1
- Challenge Tour: 3
- Other: 2

Best results in major championships
- Masters Tournament: DNP
- PGA Championship: 70th: 2010
- U.S. Open: T40: 2010
- The Open Championship: CUT: 2010

Achievements and awards
- Sunshine Tour Rookie of the Year: 2007

Ross Ian Thomas McGowan (born 23 April 1982) is an English professional golfer. He has won twice on the European Tour, the 2009 Madrid Masters and the 2020 Italian Open.

== Early life and amateur career ==
McGowan was born in Basildon, Essex, and grew up in Banstead, Surrey and educated at Epsom College. With the assistance of College Prospects of America, he went to university in the United States and played collegiate golf at the University of Tennessee. McGowan won the 2006 English Amateur, where he defeated Oliver Fisher in the final by the score of 5&4. Shortly after that he turned professional.

== Professional career ==
McGowan led the 2007 Challenge Tour Rankings going into the Apulia San Domenico Grand Final, thanks to two wins and three runner-up finishes during the year. Having finished in a tie for 28th place in the final event of the season, he dropped to second place on the money list, as Mike Lorenzo-Vera won the tournament and jumped to the top of the Challenge Tour's money list.

Courtesy of his final Challenge Tour Rankings position in 2007, McGowan graduated to the European Tour for the 2008 season. He moved into the top 100 of the Official World Golf Rankings in January of that year, and in June played in his first major championship, the U.S. Open at Torrey Pines. He made the halfway cut and eventually finished in 77th place.

McGowan won his first European Tour event in 2009 at the Madrid Masters, most notably for shooting 12 under par 60 in the third round. He finished at −25, winning by three strokes over Mikko Ilonen. McGowan finished second at the inaugural Dubai World Championship, and was ranked 12th in the Race to Dubai.

Following this McGowan suffered injuries and his form slumped. He lost his full playing rights at the end of the 2011 season. From 2012 to 2015 he played on the Challenge Tour and the Sunshine Tour. He showed a return to form in 2015, winning for the first time on the Sunshine Tour in April at the Mopani/Redpath Zambia Open, finishing two strokes ahead South African golfer Daniel van Tonder. In May he was runner-up in the D+D Real Czech Challenge, a stroke behind Jens Fahrbring. At the end of the year he finished tied for 4th in the 2015 European Tour Qualifying School final stage at PGA Catalunya Resort to regain his European Tour card for 2016.

In 2016, McGowan made 6 cuts from 18 events and lost his place on the European Tour. At the end of 2017, he again gained a place on the European Tour through the European Tour Qualifying School. 2018 was another disappointing season on the main tour and he returned to the Challenge Tour for 2019. In May 2019, he won the D+D Real Czech Challenge, his first win on the Challenge Tour since 2007.

As a Challenge Tour winner in 2019, McGowan was able to get an entry to a number of European Tour events in 2020. In October, he won the Italian Open by one shot over Laurie Canter and Nicolas Colsaerts. It was his first European Tour victory in over 11 years.

== Awards and honors ==
In 2007, McGowan earned Sunshine Tour Rookie of the Year honors

== Amateur wins ==
- 2006 English Amateur

== Professional wins (8) ==
=== European Tour wins (2) ===
No.	Date	Tournament	Winning score	Margin of victory	Runner(s)-up
1	11 Oct 2009	Madrid Masters	−25 (66-66-60-71=263)	3 strokes	(Finland) Mikko Ilonen
2	25 Oct 2020	Italian Open	−20 (66-64-67-71=268)	1 stroke	(England) Laurie Canter, (Belgium) Nicolas Colsaerts

=== Sunshine Tour wins (1) ===
No.	Date	Tournament	Winning score	Margin of victory	Runner-up
1	26 Apr 2015	Mopani/Redpath Zambia Open	−13 (68-69-71-67=275)	2 strokes	(South Africa) Daniel van Tonder

Sunshine Tour playoff record (0–1)

No.	Year	Tournament	Opponents	Result
1	2014	Lion of Africa Cape Town Open	(South Africa) Jaco Ahlers, (South Africa) Hennie Otto	Ahlers won with par on fourth extra hole Otto eliminated by par on first hole

=== Challenge Tour wins (3) ===
No.	Date	Tournament	Winning score	Margin of victory	Runner-up
1	3 Jun 2007	Oceânico Developments Pro-Am Challenge	−15 (66-63-69-67=265)	Playoff	(France) Mike Lorenzo-Vera
2	1 Jul 2007	Estoril Challenge de Portugal	−12 (68-68-70-66=272)	3 strokes	(Wales) Stuart Manley
3	26 May 2019	D+D Real Czech Challenge	−18 (66-66-66-68=266)	4 strokes	(Portugal) Ricardo Santos

Challenge Tour playoff record (1–1)

No.	Year	Tournament	Opponent	Result
1	2007	Oceânico Developments Pro-Am Challenge	(France) Mike Lorenzo-Vera	Won with par on second extra hole
2	2007	Open AGF-Allianz Côtes d'Armor Bretagne	(England) Peter Baker	Lost to par on first extra hole

=== MENA Golf Tour wins (2) ===
No.	Date	Tournament	Winning score	Margin of victory	Runner(s)-up
1	3 Oct 2012	Abu Dhabi Golf Citizen Open	−12 (68-69-67=204)	6 strokes	(Austria) Roland Steiner
2	6 Apr 2015	Royal Golf Dar Es Salam Open	−3 (74-74-68=216)	2 strokes	(England) Stuart Archibald, (England) Jack Hiluta

== Results in major championships ==
Tournament	2008	2009	2010
U.S. Open	77		T40
The Open Championship			CUT
PGA Championship			70

Note: McGowan never played in the Masters Tournament.

Did not play

CUT = missed the half-way cut
"T" = tied

== Results in World Golf Championships ==
Tournament	2010
Match Play	R32
Championship	T30
Invitational	T55
Champions	

Did not play

QF, R16, R32, R64 = Round in which player lost in match play
"T" = Tied

== Team appearances ==
Amateur

- Eisenhower Trophy (representing England): 2006
- St Andrews Trophy (representing Great Britain & Ireland): 2006 (winners)

== See also ==
- 2007 Challenge Tour graduates
- 2015 European Tour Qualifying School graduates
- 2017 European Tour Qualifying School graduates
