= 2018–19 Sunshine Tour =

Golf tour season

2018–19 Sunshine Tour season
- Duration: 12 April 2018 – 24 March 2019
- Number of official events: 26
- Most wins: (South Africa) J. C. Ritchie (3)
- Order of Merit: (South Africa) Zander Lombard
- Rookie of the Year: (Zimbabwe) Benjamin Follett-Smith

The 2018–19 Sunshine Tour was the 48th season of the Sunshine Tour (formerly the Southern Africa Tour), the main professional golf tour in South Africa since it was formed in 1971.

== Schedule ==
The following table lists official events during the 2018–19 season.

Date	Tournament	Location	Purse (R)	Winner (Note: The number in brackets after each winner's name is the number of Sunshine Tour events they had won up to and including that tournament. This information is only shown for Sunshine Tour members.)	OWGR points	Other tours (Note: ASA − Asian Tour; EUR − European Tour.)	Notes
15 Apr	Zanaco Masters	Zambia	2,000,000	(South Africa) J. J. Senekal (2)	14		
22 Apr	Old Mutual Zimbabwe Open	Zimbabwe	2,000,000	(South Africa) Bryce Easton (3)	14		
29 Apr	Mopani Redpath Zambia Open	Zambia	US$150,000	(South Africa) Rourke van der Spuy (2)	14		
12 May	Investec Royal Swazi Open	Eswatini	1,200,000	(South Africa) Justin Harding (6)	14		
20 May	Lombard Insurance Classic	Eswatini	1,000,000	(South Africa) Justin Harding (7)	7		
7 Jun	Sun City Challenge	North West	800,000	(South Africa) Neil Schietekat (2)	7		
22 Jul	KCB Karen Masters	Kenya	2,000,000	(South Africa) Michael Palmer (1)	14		New to Sunshine Tour
3 Aug	Royal Swazi Spa Challenge	Eswatini	800,000	(South Africa) Andre de Decker (1)	7		New tournament
10 Aug	Sun Carnival City Challenge	Gauteng	800,000	(South Africa) J. C. Ritchie (2)	7		
18 Aug	Vodacom Origins of Golf at Zebula	Limpopo	800,000	(South Africa) Zander Lombard (1)	7		
25 Aug	Sun Wild Coast Sun Challenge	KwaZulu-Natal	800,000	(South Africa) Vaughn Groenewald (6)	7		
1 Sep	Vodacom Origins of Golf at Selborne Park	KwaZulu-Natal	800,000	(Greece) Peter Karmis (6)	7		
16 Sep	Vodacom Origins of Golf at Arabella	Western Cape	800,000	(South Africa) Neil Schietekat (3)	7		
29 Sep	Vodacom Origins of Golf at St Francis	Eastern Cape	800,000	(South Africa) Alex Haindl (2)	4		
20 Oct	Vodacom Origins of Golf at Parys	Free State	800,000	(South Africa) Garth Mulroy (4)	4		
26 Oct	Sun Sibaya Challenge	KwaZulu-Natal	800,000	(South Africa) Louis de Jager (4)	4		
3 Nov	Vodacom Origins of Golf Final	Eastern Cape	800,000	(England) Steve Surry (1)	4		
2 Dec	AfrAsia Bank Mauritius Open	Mauritius	€1,000,000	(United States) Kurt Kitayama (n/a)	17	ASA, EUR	
9 Dec	South African Open	Gauteng	17,500,000	(South Africa) Louis Oosthuizen (8)	32	ASA, EUR	Flagship event
16 Dec	Alfred Dunhill Championship	Mpumalanga	€1,500,000	(United States) David Lipsky (n/a)	23	EUR	
3 Feb	Eye of Africa PGA Championship	Gauteng	2,000,000	(South Africa) Louis de Jager (5)	14		
10 Feb	RAM Cape Town Open	Western Cape	2,000,000	(Zimbabwe) Benjamin Follett-Smith (1)	14		
17 Feb	Dimension Data Pro-Am	Western Cape	5,050,000	(Sweden) Philip Eriksson (1)	14		Pro-Am
2 Mar	Team Championship	Gauteng	1,500,000	(South Africa) Jaco Prinsloo (2) and (South Africa) J. C. Ritchie (3)	n/a		Team event
10 Mar	Limpopo Championship	Modimolle	1,500,000	(South Africa) J. C. Ritchie (4)	14		New tournament
24 Mar	The Tour Championship	Gauteng	2,000,000	(South Africa) Jean-Paul Strydom (1)	14		Tour Championship

== Order of Merit ==
The Order of Merit was based on prize money won during the season, calculated in South African rand.

Position	Player	Prize money (R)
1	(South Africa) Zander Lombard	2,119,985
2	(South Africa) Justin Harding	1,467,795
3	(South Africa) Bryce Easton	1,361,129
4	(South Africa) Neil Schietekat	1,206,168
5	(Sweden) Philip Eriksson	1,059,234

== Awards ==
Award	Winner	Ref.
Rookie of the Year (Bobby Locke Trophy)	(Zimbabwe) Benjamin Follett-Smith	

== See also ==
- 2018 Big Easy Tour
