= Ockie Strydom =

South African professional golfer

Personal information
- Full name: Ockert Strydom
- Nationality: South Africa
- Born: 8 January 1985 (age 41) Kempton Park, South Africa

Career
- Sport: Golf
- Turned professional: 2009
- Current tours: European Tour; Sunshine Tour
- Former tour: Big Easy Tour
- Professional wins: 14

Number of wins by tour
- European Tour: 2
- Sunshine Tour: 2
- Other: 11

Best results in major championships
- Masters Tournament: DNP
- PGA Championship: CUT: 2023
- U.S. Open: DNP
- The Open Championship: CUT: 2023

Achievements and awards
- Sunshine Tour Order of Merit winner: 2022–23

Ockert Strydom (born 8 January 1985) is a South African professional golfer who plays on the European Tour and Sunshine Tour. He claimed his maiden European Tour win at the 2022 Alfred Dunhill Championship.

== Professional career ==
Strydom won the 2019 Vodacom Origins of Golf at Sishen that was part of the 2019–20 Sunshine Tour.

In December 2022, Strydom won the Alfred Dunhill Championship, part of the 2023 European Tour and the 2022–23 Sunshine Tour, where he set a course record in the third round. Two months later, he won the Singapore Classic on the European Tour. He shot a final-round 63 to beat Sami Välimäki by one shot.

== Professional wins (14) ==
=== European Tour wins (2) ===
No.	Date	Tournament	Winning score	Margin of victory	Runner-up
1	11 Dec 2022 (2023 season)	Alfred Dunhill Championship^{1}	−18 (68-70-63-69=270)	2 strokes	(Spain) Adrián Otaegui
2	12 Feb 2023	Singapore Classic	−19 (71-68-67-63=269)	1 stroke	(Finland) Sami Välimäki

^{1}Co-sanctioned by the Sunshine Tour

=== Sunshine Tour wins (2) ===
No.	Date	Tournament	Winning score	Margin of victory	Runner-up
1	24 Aug 2019	Vodacom Origins of Golf at Sishen	−16 (69-65-66=200)	6 strokes	(South Africa) Thriston Lawrence
2	11 Dec 2022	Alfred Dunhill Championship^{1}	−18 (68-70-63-69=270)	2 strokes	(Spain) Adrián Otaegui

^{1}Co-sanctioned by the European Tour

Sunshine Tour playoff record (0–3)

No.	Year	Tournament	Opponent	Result
1	2017	Vodacom Origins of Golf at Sishen	(South Africa) Hennie du Plessis	Lost to birdie on fourth extra hole
2	2022	Stella Artois Players Championship	(South Africa) Jaco Ahlers	Lost to birdie on second extra hole
3	2022	Lombard Insurance Classic	(South Africa) Herman Loubser	Lost to birdie on second extra hole

=== IGT Pro Tour wins (11) ===
No.	Date	Tournament	Winning score	Margin of victory	Runner(s)-up
1	15 Jul 2012	Mafeking Pro-Am	−5 (75-68-68=211)	1 stroke	(South Africa) Jean Hugo
2	28 Apr 2013	Mafeking Pro-Am (2)	−18 (63-67-68=198)	2 strokes	(South Africa) Beyers Smith
3	4 Mar 2014	IGT Series Wingate Park Country Club	−9 (70-65=135)	1 stroke	(South Africa) Tertius van den Berg
4	12 Mar 2014	IGT Series ERPM Golf Club	−13 (71-66-66=203)	Playoff	(South Africa) Toto Thimba Jr.
5	22 Oct 2014	Race to Q-School Ruimsig Country Club	−15 (68-65-68=201)	3 strokes	(South Africa) Zander Lombard
6	3 Dec 2014	Race to Q-School Centurion Country Club	−18 (66-63-69=198)	1 stroke	(South Africa) CJ du Plessis
7	9 Jun 2016	Killarney Challenge	−4 (71-64-71=206)	Playoff	(South Africa) Warrick Druian
8	22 Jun 2016	Wingate Challenge	−4 (71-69-72=212)	2 strokes	(South Africa) Mourne Buys, (South Africa) Juan Swart
9	30 Jun 2016	Centurion Championship	−13 (74-65-70-66=275)	2 strokes	(South Africa) Daniel van Tonder
10	13 Jul 2016	Waterkloof Challenge	−18 (66-66-66=198)	8 strokes	(South Africa) Christiaan Bezuidenhout
11	31 Aug 2016	Centurion Challenge	−16 (64-67-69=200)	Playoff	(South Africa) Aubrey Beckley (a)

== Results in major championships ==
Tournament	2023
Masters Tournament	
PGA Championship	CUT
U.S. Open	
The Open Championship	CUT

Did not play

CUT = missed the half-way cut
