= Thriston Lawrence =

South African professional golfer

Personal information
- Nationality: South Africa
- Born: 3 December 1996 (age 29) Nelspruit, South Africa

Career
- Sport: Golf
- Turned professional: 2014
- Current tours: European Tour; Sunshine Tour
- Former tours: PGA Tour; Challenge Tour; MENA Tour; Big Easy Tour
- Professional wins: 11
- Highest ranking: 45 (15 December 2024) (as of 1 November 2026)

Number of wins by tour
- European Tour: 6
- Sunshine Tour: 4
- Other: 3

Best results in major championships
- Masters Tournament: CUT: 2025
- PGA Championship: T62: 2023
- U.S. Open: T12: 2025
- The Open Championship: 4th: 2024

Achievements and awards
- MENA Golf Tour Order of Merit winner: 2015
- Sir Henry Cotton Rookie of the Year: 2022

Thriston Lawrence (born 3 December 1996) is a South African professional golfer who currently plays on the PGA Tour, European Tour and the Sunshine Tour. He has won six times on the European Tour.

== Professional career ==
Lawrence turned professional in 2014. He played on the MENA Tour in 2015 and the Challenge Tour in 2016. He won the MENA Tour Order of Merit in 2015. He played on the Big Easy Tour in 2018, gaining his card for the 2019–20 Sunshine Tour season. He won his first Sunshine Tour event in 2019 at the Vodacom Origins of Golf at Stellenbosch.

Lawrence claimed the biggest victory of his career (at that time) at the 2021 Joburg Open. It was a co-sanctioned European Tour and Sunshine Tour event. The event was shortened to 36 holes due to inclement weather. Lawrence shot two rounds of 65 to win by four shots over Zander Lombard. In August 2022, Lawrence won the Omega European Masters, beating Matt Wallace in a playoff. He was named Sir Henry Cotton Rookie of the Year for the 2022 European Tour season. In December 2022, Lawrence won the Investec South African Open Championship, one shot ahead of Clément Sordet and climbing to a career best 64th in the Official World Golf Ranking.

In June 2023, Lawrence claimed his fourth win on the European Tour at the BMW International Open in Germany. Starting the final round four shots back, he recorded a 69 to win by one shot ahead of Joost Luiten.

At the 2024 Open Championship in July, Lawrence finished solo-fourth, three shots behind winner Xander Schauffele to record his best finish in a major championship. With five other runner-up finishes during the 2024 European Tour season, Lawrence finished third on the Race to Dubai, claiming a PGA Tour card for the 2025 season. In August 2025, Lawrence claimed his second Omega European Masters title, and his 5th overall on the DP World Tour.

== Amateur wins ==
- 2013 South African Amateur Championship
- 2014 Lytham Trophy, South African Amateur Championship

== Professional wins (11) ==
=== European Tour wins (6) ===
No.	Date	Tournament	Winning score	Margin of victory	Runner(s)-up
1	27 Nov 2021 (2022 season)	Joburg Open^{1}	−12 (65-65=130) (Note: Shortened to 36 holes due to weather.)	4 strokes	(South Africa) Zander Lombard
2	28 Aug 2022	Omega European Masters	−18 (62-64-67-69=262)	Playoff	(England) Matt Wallace
3	4 Dec 2022 (2023 season)	Investec South African Open Championship^{1}	−16 (64-67-67-74=272)	1 stroke	(France) Clément Sordet
4	25 Jun 2023	BMW International Open	−13 (71-69-66-69=275)	1 stroke	(Netherlands) Joost Luiten
5	31 Aug 2025	Omega European Masters (2)	−22 (63-66-63-66=258)	2 strokes	(Denmark) Rasmus Højgaard, (Finland) Sami Välimäki, (England) Matt Wallace
6	6 Sep 2026	Omega European Masters (3)	−18 (64-63-73-62=262)	Playoff	(England) Paul Casey

^{1}Co-sanctioned by the Sunshine Tour

European Tour playoff record (2–1)

No.	Year	Tournament	Opponent(s)	Result
1	2022	Omega European Masters	(England) Matt Wallace	Won with par on first extra hole
2	2024	BMW PGA Championship	(United States) Billy Horschel, (Northern Ireland) Rory McIlroy	Horschel won with eagle on second extra hole Lawrence eliminated by birdie on first hole
3	2026	Omega European Masters	(England) Paul Casey	Won with birdie on fourth extra hole

=== Sunshine Tour wins (4) ===
No.	Date	Tournament	Winning score	Margin of victory	Runner(s)-up
1	5 Oct 2019	Vodacom Origins of Golf at Stellenbosch	−15 (68-68-65=201)	1 stroke	(South Africa) Deon Germishuys, (South Africa) Riekus Nortje, (South Africa) J. J. Senekal, (South Africa) Jean-Paul Strydom
2	27 Nov 2021	Joburg Open^{1}	−12 (65-65=130)	4 strokes	(South Africa) Zander Lombard
3	4 Dec 2022	Investec South African Open Championship^{1}	−16 (64-67-67-74=272)	1 stroke	(France) Clément Sordet
4	23 Aug 2024	SunBet Challenge (Time Square Casino)	−20 (62-67-67=196)	5 strokes	(South Africa) Dylan Naidoo

^{1}Co-sanctioned by the European Tour

=== MENA Golf Tour wins (1) ===
No.	Date	Tournament	Winning score	Margin of victory	Runners-up
1	4 Nov 2015	Ras Al Khaimah Classic	−12 (69-66-69=204)	4 strokes	(Spain) Gabriel Cañizares, (Northern Ireland) Darren Clarke, (South Africa) Michael Downes, (Republic of Ireland) Tyler Hogarty

=== Big Easy Tour wins (1) ===
No.	Date	Tournament	Winning score	Margin of victory	Runner-up
1	28 Nov 2018	Big Easy Challenge 15	−15 (65-69-67=201)	5 strokes	(South Africa) Albert Venter

=== IGT Pro Tour wins (1) ===
No.	Date	Tournament	Winning score	Margin of victory	Runner-up
1	1 Mar 2017	Centurion Race to Q-School #18	−16 (65-70-65=200)	3 strokes	(South Africa) Coert Groenewald

== Results in major championships ==
Tournament	2022	2023	2024	2025
Masters Tournament				CUT
PGA Championship		T62	CUT	CUT
U.S. Open		CUT		T12
The Open Championship	T42	T74	4	T45

Top 10
Did not play

CUT = missed the half-way cut
"T" = tied

== See also ==
- 2024 Race to Dubai dual card winners
