= Bryce Easton =

South African professional golfer

Personal information
- Nationality: South Africa
- Born: 5 September 1987 (age 39) Durban, South Africa
- Height: 6 ft 1 in (1.85 m)

Career
- Sport: Golf
- College: University of Texas at Arlington
- Turned professional: 2007
- Current tours: Challenge Tour; Sunshine Tour
- Former tours: Asian Tour; European Tour; Big Easy Tour
- Professional wins: 4

Number of wins by tour
- Sunshine Tour: 3
- Other: 1

Bryce Easton (born 5 September 1987) is a South African professional golfer who plays on the Challenge Tour and the Sunshine Tour.

== Career ==
In 1987, Easton was born in Durban, South Africa. In 2011, he joined the Sunshine Tour and finished in 46th on the Order of Merit in his rookie season. On 26 May 2012, he picked up his first win on Tour at the Sun City Challenge. Easton eagled the final hole of the tournament to force a playoff with Brandon Pieters, Allan Versfeld, and Andrew Georgiou. He then shot another eagle to win the playoff. He picked up his second win two weeks later at the Vodacom Origins of Golf (Zebula).

== Amateur wins ==
- 2005 KZN Invitational, Zululand Open

== Professional wins (4) ==
=== Sunshine Tour wins (3) ===
No.	Date	Tournament	Winning score	Margin of victory	Runner(s)-up
1	26 May 2012	Sun City Challenge	−9 (66-69-72=207)	Playoff	(South Africa) Andrew Georgiou, (South Africa) Brandon Pieters, (South Africa) Allan Versfeld
2	8 Jun 2012	Vodacom Origins of Golf at Zebula	−16 (68-64-68=200)	3 strokes	(Scotland) Doug McGuigan
3	22 Apr 2018	Old Mutual Zimbabwe Open	−16 (69-67-73-63=272)	1 stroke	(South Africa) Daniel van Tonder

Sunshine Tour playoff record (1–0)

No.	Year	Tournament	Opponents	Result
1	2012	Sun City Challenge	(South Africa) Andrew Georgiou, (South Africa) Brandon Pieters, (South Africa) Allan Versfeld	Won with eagle on first extra hole

=== Big Easy Tour wins (1) ===
No.	Date	Tournament	Winning score	Margin of victory	Runner-up
1	25 Mar 2011	Crown Mines	−5 (71-68=139)	2 strokes	(South Africa) Thabang Simon

== Results in World Golf Championships ==
Tournament	2019
Championship	
Match Play	
Invitational	
Champions	T43

Did not play

"T" = Tied

== See also ==
- 2022 Challenge Tour graduates
