= PH McIntyre =

South African professional golfer (born 1986)

Personal information
- Nationality: South Africa
- Born: 18 August 1986 (age 40)
- Height: 6 ft 1 in (1.85 m)
- Weight: 165 lb (75 kg; 11.8 st)

Career
- Sport: Golf
- Turned professional: 2008
- Current tour: Sunshine Tour
- Professional wins: 3

Number of wins by tour
- Sunshine Tour: 2
- Other: 1

PH McIntyre (born 18 August 1986) is a South African professional golfer.

== Career ==
McIntyre has played on the Sunshine Tour since turning professional in 2008. He has won twice, including the 2015 Investec Royal Swazi Open.

== Professional wins (3) ==
=== Sunshine Tour wins (2) ===
No.	Date	Tournament	Winning score	Margin of victory	Runner-up
1	3 Oct 2014	Vodacom Origins of Golf at Vaal de Grace	−16 (64-68-68=200)	Playoff	(South Africa) Jake Roos
2	9 May 2015	Investec Royal Swazi Open	48 pts (4-12-14-18=48)	1 point	(South Africa) Morne Buys

Sunshine Tour playoff record (1–0)

No.	Year	Tournament	Opponent	Result
1	2014	Vodacom Origins of Golf at Vaal de Grace	(South Africa) Jake Roos	Won with birdie on third extra hole

=== IGT Pro Tour wins (1) ===
No.	Date	Tournament	Winning score	Margin of victory	Runner-up
1	4 Jan 2013	IGT Warm Up Challenge	−5 (67)	Playoff	(South Africa) Hertzog Landman
