= Zander Lombard =

South African professional golfer (born 1995)

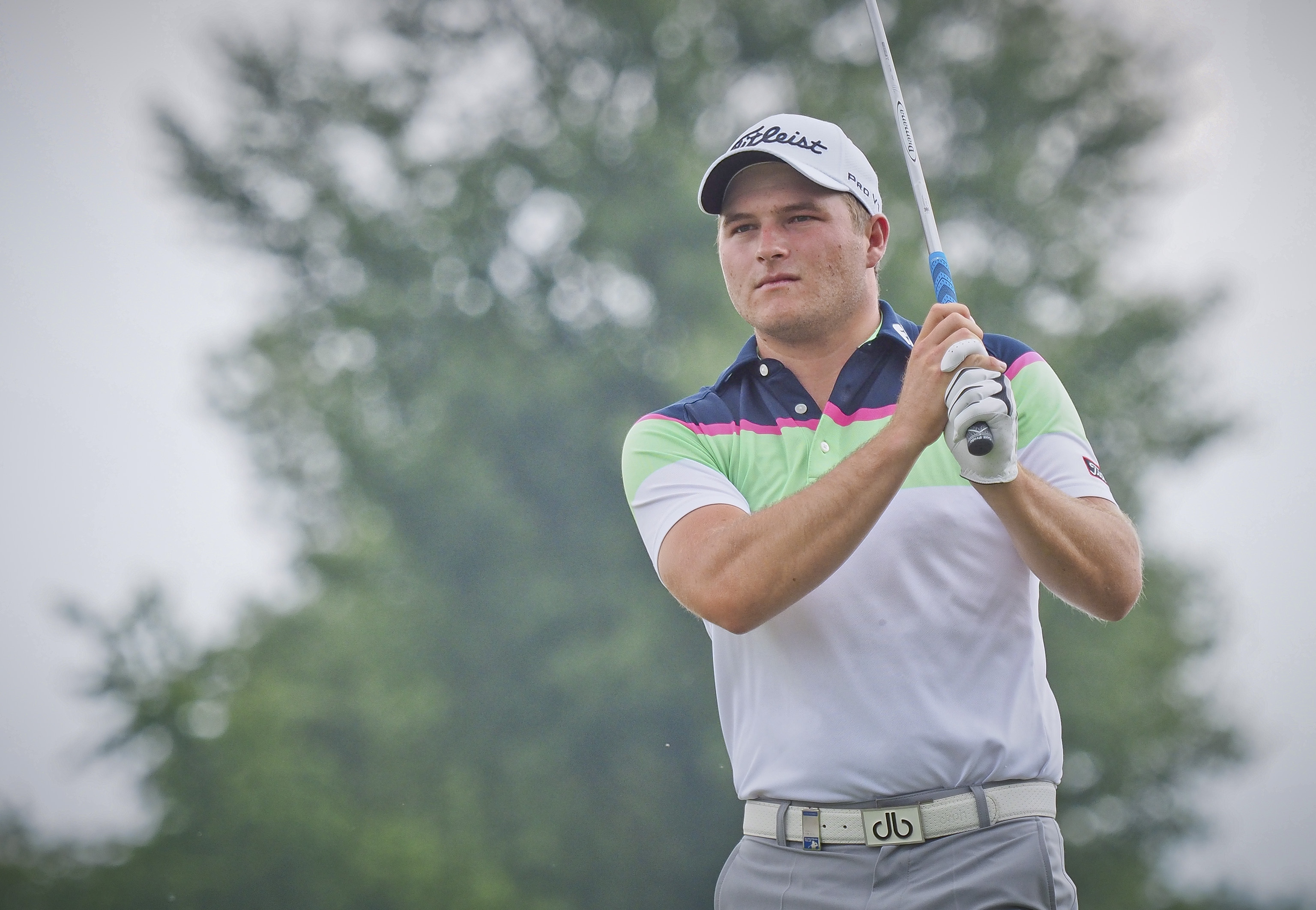
- Lombard in 2016

Personal information
- Nationality: South Africa
- Born: 18 January 1995 (age 31) Pretoria, South Africa
- Height: 1.81 m (5 ft 11 in)
- Weight: 85 kg (187 lb; 13.4 st)

Career
- Sport: Golf
- Turned professional: 2014
- Current tours: Sunshine Tour; European Tour
- Former tour: Challenge Tour
- Professional wins: 9
- Highest ranking: 96 (18 February 2024) (as of 25 October 2026)

Number of wins by tour
- Sunshine Tour: 1
- Other: 8

Best results in major championships
- Masters Tournament: DNP
- PGA Championship: DNP
- U.S. Open: DNP
- The Open Championship: T66: 2016

Achievements and awards
- Sunshine Tour Order of Merit winner: 2018–19

Zander Lombard (born 18 January 1995) is a South African professional golfer.

== Amateur career ==
As an amateur, Lombard won several events in Africa and represented South Africa in the Eisenhower Trophy in 2012 and 2014. In 2014, he was runner-up at The Amateur Championship, losing to Bradley Neil in the final, 2 and 1. He turned professional in late 2014.

== Professional career ==
Lombard earned a spot in the 2016 Open Championship after a second-place finish at the Joburg Open, an Open Qualifying Series event. He made the cut, and finished tied for 66th.

Lombard was runner-up in the 2017 Rocco Forte Open in Sicily, losing to Álvaro Quirós at the second hole of a sudden-death playoff.

After a poor start to 2018, Lombard tied for 6th place in the Dubai Duty Free Irish Open. This also gave him a place in the 2018 Open Championship where he finished tied for 67th. In August, he won the Vodacom Origins (Zebula) on the Sunshine Tour.

== Amateur wins ==
- 2011 South African U16 Strokeplay
- 2012 North West Open
- 2013 Namibian Open, Kwazulu-Natal Amateur Championship, IGT Winter Challenge Centurion

== Professional wins (9) ==
=== Sunshine Tour wins (1) ===
No.	Date	Tournament	Winning score	Margin of victory	Runner-up
1	18 Aug 2018	Vodacom Origins of Golf at Zebula	−10 (72-68-66=206)	Playoff	(South Africa) Jake Roos

Sunshine Tour playoff record (1–0)

No.	Year	Tournament	Opponent	Result
1	2018	Vodacom Origins of Golf at Zebula	(South Africa) Jake Roos	Won with par on first extra hole

=== IGT Pro Tour wins (8) ===
No.	Date	Tournament	Winning score	Margin of victory	Runner(s)-up
1	18 Apr 2012	#9 IGT Summer Series (as an amateur)	−9 (71-67-69=207)	3 strokes	(South Africa) Coert Groenewald (a)
2	13 Jun 2012	#16 IGT Winter Series (as an amateur)	−8 (68-69-71=208)	1 stroke	(South Africa) Jacques Kruyswijk (a)
3	26 Jun 2013	IGT Winter Challenge Centurion Country Club (as an amateur)	−7 (68-68-73=209)	1 stroke	(South Africa) Coert Groenewald, (South Africa) Phillip Kruse
4	30 Oct 2013	IGT Race to Q-School Silver Lakes CC (as an amateur)	−16 (66-70-64=200)	5 strokes	(South Africa) Otto van Greunen
5	27 Nov 2013	IGT Race to Q-School Centurion CC (as an amateur)	−6 (71-69-70=210)	1 stroke	(South Africa) Pieter Kruger, (South Africa) Rae Mackie
6	19 Mar 2014	IGT Series Benoni Country Club (as an amateur)	−10 (72-66-68=206)	1 stroke	(South Africa) Michael Downes, (South Korea) Park Hyun
7	27 Oct 2014	Race to Q-School Irene Country Club (as an amateur)	−12 (68-73-63=204)	4 strokes	(South Africa) Breyten Meyer (a)
8	1 Feb 2017	Woodhill Race to Q-School #14	−19 (64-67-66=197)	5 strokes	(Zambia) Madalitso Muthiya

== Playoff record ==
European Tour playoff record (0–1)

No.	Year	Tournament	Opponent	Result
1	2017	Rocco Forte Open	(Spain) Álvaro Quirós	Lost to par on second extra hole

== Results in major championships ==
Results not in chronological order in 2020.

Tournament	2016	2017	2018
Masters Tournament			
U.S. Open			
The Open Championship	T66		T67
PGA Championship			

Tournament	2019	2020	2021	2022
Masters Tournament				
PGA Championship				
U.S. Open				
The Open Championship	CUT	NT		CUT

Did not play

CUT = missed the half-way cut
"T" = tied
NT = No tournament due to the COVID-19 pandemic

== Results in World Golf Championships ==
Tournament	2019	2020
Championship		T26
Match Play		NT^{1}
Invitational		
Champions	72	NT^{1}

^{1}Cancelled due to COVID-19 pandemic

Did not play

NT = no tournament
"T" = tied

== Team appearances ==
Amateur

- Eisenhower Trophy (representing South Africa): 2012, 2014

== See also ==
- 2018 European Tour Qualifying School graduates
- 2025 European Tour Qualifying School graduates
