= Vodacom Origins of Golf =

Tournament information
- Location: South Africa
- Established: 2004
- Tour: Sunshine Tour
- Format: Stroke play

Tournament record score
- Aggregate: 54 holes: 195 Jean Hugo (2015); 195 George Coetzee (2022); 72 holes: 260 Dean Burmester (2024)
- To par: 54 holes: −21 as above 72 holes: −28 as above

The Vodacom Origins of Golf is a series of pro-am golf tournaments in South Africa. The series began in 2004 and forms part of the winter swing of the Southern Africa-based Sunshine Tour.

== 2004–05 season ==
Date	Tournament	Winner	Score	To par	Margin of victory	Runner(s)-up	Ref.
29 May 2004	Vodacom Origins of Golf at Pezula	(South Africa) Patrick O'Brien	210	−6	1 stroke	(South Africa) Ulrich van den Berg	
12 Jun 2004	Vodacom Origins of Golf at Schoeman Park	(South Africa) Steve van Vuuren	200	−16	4 strokes	(South Africa) Ulrich van den Berg	
2 Jul 2004	Vodacom Origins of Golf at Zimbali	(South Africa) Thomas Aiken	204	−12	Playoff	(South Africa) Keith Horne	
22 Jul 2004	Vodacom Origins of Golf at Sun City	(South Africa) Thomas Aiken (2)	204	−12	3 strokes	(South Africa) Des Terblanche	
19 Sep 2004	Vodacom Origins of Golf at Arabella	(South Africa) Louis Oosthuizen	215	−1	1 stroke	(South Africa) Keith Horne	
21 Oct 2004	Vodacom Origins of Golf Final	(South Africa) Thomas Aiken (3)	214	−5	7 strokes	(South Africa) Jean Hugo	

== 2005–06 season ==
Date	Tournament	Winner	Score	To par	Margin of victory	Runner(s)-up	Ref.
13 May 2005	Vodacom Origins of Golf at Pretoria	(South Africa) Desvonde Botes	202	−14	Playoff	(South Africa) Jean Hugo	
27 May 2005	Vodacom Origins of Golf at Pezula	(South Africa) Desvonde Botes (2)	198	−18	6 strokes	(South Africa) Ian Hutchings	
1 Jul 2005	Vodacom Origins of Golf at Wild Coast Sun	(South Africa) Dean Lambert	205	−5	1 stroke	(South Africa) Grant Muller (South Africa) Lindani Ndwandwe	
26 Aug 2005	Vodacom Origins of Golf at Bloemfontein	(South Africa) Nic Henning	205	−11	1 stroke	(Scotland) Doug McGuigan	
9 Sep 2005	Vodacom Origins of Golf at Erinvale	(South Africa) Hennie Otto	202	−14	1 stroke	(South Africa) Thomas Aiken	
21 Oct 2005	Vodacom Origins of Golf Final	(South Africa) Steve Basson	218	−1	4 strokes	(South Africa) Chris Williams	

== 2006–07 season ==
Date	Tournament	Winner	Score	To par	Margin of victory	Runner(s)-up	Ref.
21 Apr 2006	Vodacom Origins of Golf at Arabella	(South Africa) Jean Hugo	208	−8	5 strokes	(South Africa) Chris Williams	
26 May 2006	Vodacom Origins of Golf at Pretoria	(South Africa) Vaughn Groenewald	205	−11	6 strokes	(South Africa) Thomas Aiken (Scotland) Doug McGuigan	
30 Jun 2006	Vodacom Origins of Golf at Selborne	(South Africa) Rossouw Loubser	205	−8	1 stroke	(Brazil) Adilson da Silva (South Africa) Vaughn Groenewald	
18 Aug 2006	Vodacom Origins of Golf at Bloemfontein	(South Africa) Rossouw Loubser (2)	205	−11	2 strokes	(Brazil) Adilson da Silva (Scotland) Doug McGuigan	
15 Sep 2006	Vodacom Origins of Golf at Pezula	(South Africa) Kevin Stone	207	−9	1 stroke	(South Africa) Ian Hutchings	
6 Oct 2006	Vodacom Origins of Golf Final	(South Africa) Darren Fichardt	212	−4	1 stroke	(South Africa) Alex Haindl	

== 2007 season ==
Date	Tournament	Winner	Score	To par	Margin of victory	Runner(s)-up	Ref.
20 Apr 2007	Vodacom Origins of Golf at Arabella	(South Africa) Andrew Curlewis	207	−9	Playoff	(South Africa) Alan Michell	
11 May 2007	Vodacom Origins of Golf at Pretoria	(South Africa) Hennie Otto (2)	201	−15	3 strokes	(South Africa) James Kamte	
15 Jun 2007	Vodacom Origins of Golf at Selborne	(South Africa) George Coetzee	207	−9	2 strokes	(South Africa) Ulrich van den Berg	
3 Aug 2007	Vodacom Origins of Golf at Bloemfontein	(South Africa) Ulrich van den Berg	202	−14	3 strokes	(South Africa) Bradford Vaughan	
24 Aug 2007	Vodacom Origins of Golf at Fancourt	(Brazil) Adilson da Silva	217	−2	Playoff	(South Africa) Warren Abery	
28 Sep 2007	Vodacom Origins of Golf Final	(South Africa) Titch Moore	209	−7	3 strokes	(South Africa) Ulrich van den Berg	

== 2008 season ==
Date	Tournament	Winner	Score	To par	Margin of victory	Runner(s)-up	Ref.
4 Apr 2008	Vodacom Origins of Golf at Bloemfontein	(South Africa) Dion Fourie	201	−15	2 strokes	(South Africa) Jean Hugo (South Africa) Chris Swanepoel	
25 Apr 2008	Vodacom Origins of Golf at Pretoria	(South Africa) Tyrone van Aswegen	201	−15	4 strokes	(South Africa) Darren Fichardt (South Africa) Neil Schietekat	
30 May 2008	Vodacom Origins of Golf at Selborne	(South Africa) Jean Hugo (2)	203	−13	2 strokes	(South Africa) Bradford Vaughan	
29 Aug 2008	Vodacom Origins of Golf at Arabella	(South Africa) Garth Mulroy	210	−6	4 strokes	(South Africa) Richard Sterne	
19 Sep 2008	Vodacom Origins of Golf at Humewood	(South Africa) George Coetzee (2)	212	−4	1 stroke	(South Africa) Jean Hugo	
24 Oct 2008	Vodacom Origins of Golf Final	(South Africa) Jaco van Zyl	214	−2	1 stroke	(South Africa) Bradford Vaughan	

== 2009 season ==
Date	Tournament	Winner	Score	To par	Margin of victory	Runner(s)-up	Ref.
3 Apr 2009	Vodacom Origins of Golf at Bloemfontein	(South Africa) Trevor Fisher Jnr	201	−15	1 stroke	(South Africa) Jean Hugo (South Africa) Willie van der Merwe	
22 May 2009	Vodacom Origins of Golf at Pretoria	(South Africa) Brandon Pieters	204	−12	1 stroke	(South Africa) Darren Fichardt	
25 Jun 2009	Vodacom Origins of Golf at Fancourt	(South Africa) Brandon Pieters (2)	141 (Note: Shortened to 36 holes due to weather.)	−3	1 stroke	(South Africa) Clinton Whitelaw	
14 Aug 2009	Vodacom Origins of Golf at Erinvale	(South Africa) Jaco Ahlers	135	−9	Playoff	(South Africa) Ulrich van den Berg	
18 Sep 2009	Vodacom Origins of Golf at Selborne	(South Africa) Darren Fichardt (2)	198	−18	7 strokes	(South Africa) Keenan Davidse (South Africa) Jbe' Kruger	
9 Oct 2009	Vodacom Origins of Golf Final	(South Africa) Brandon Pieters (3)	208	−8	1 stroke	(Scotland) Doug McGuigan (South Africa) Jaco van Zyl	

== 2010 season ==
Date	Tournament	Winner	Score	To par	Margin of victory	Runner(s)-up	Ref.
16 Apr 2010	Vodacom Origins of Golf at Gardener Ross	(South Africa) Jean Hugo (3)	201	−15	1 stroke	(South Africa) Charl Schwartzel	
30 Apr 2010	Vodacom Origins of Golf at Sishen	(South Africa) Jaco van Zyl (2)	200	−16	1 stroke	(South Africa) Jean Hugo (South Africa) Jbe' Kruger	
30 Jul 2010	Vodacom Origins of Golf at Humewood	(South Africa) Ulrich van den Berg (2)	202	−14	1 stroke	(South Africa) Daniel Greene	
20 Aug 2010	Vodacom Origins of Golf at Selborne	(South Africa) James Kingston	203	−13	2 strokes	(Brazil) Adilson da Silva	
18 Sep 2010	Vodacom Origins of Golf at Stellenbosch	(South Africa) Jean Hugo (4)	199	−17	3 strokes	(South Africa) Shaun Norris	
15 Oct 2010	Vodacom Origins of Golf Final	(South Africa) Justin Harding	209	−7	1 stroke	(South Africa) Ulrich van den Berg	

== 2011 season ==
Date	Tournament	Winner	Score	To par	Margin of victory	Runner(s)-up	Ref.
27 May 2011	Vodacom Origins of Golf at Pretoria	(South Africa) Jean Hugo (5)	205	−11	3 strokes	(South Africa) George Coetzee (Brazil) Adilson da Silva	
10 Jun 2011	Vodacom Origins of Golf at Arabella	(South Africa) Chris Swanepoel	205	−11	3 strokes	(South Africa) Christiaan Basson	
29 Jul 2011	Vodacom Origins of Golf at Simola	(South Africa) Jean Hugo (6)	201	−15	Playoff	(South Africa) Peter Karmis	
12 Aug 2011	Vodacom Origins of Golf at Wild Coast Sun	(South Africa) Darren Fichardt (3)	204	−6	1 stroke	(South Africa) David Hewan	
2 Sep 2011	Vodacom Origins of Golf at Sishen	(Brazil) Adilson da Silva (2)	206	−10	2 strokes	(South Africa) Allan Versfeld	
23 Sep 2011	Vodacom Origins of Golf Final	(South Africa) Jean Hugo (7)	208	−8	2 strokes	(South Africa) Louis de Jager (South Africa) Lyle Rowe	

== 2012 season ==
Date	Tournament	Winner	Score	To par	Margin of victory	Runner(s)-up	Ref.
11 May 2012	Vodacom Origins of Golf at Simola	(Zimbabwe) Ryan Cairns	201	−15	Playoff	(South Africa) Vaughn Groenewald	
8 Jun 2012	Vodacom Origins of Golf at Zebula	(South Africa) Bryce Easton	200	−16	3 strokes	(Scotland) Doug McGuigan	
27 Jul 2012	Vodacom Origins of Golf at De Zalze	(South Africa) Allan Versfeld	198	−18	3 strokes	(South Africa) Ockie Strydom	
24 Aug 2012	Vodacom Origins of Golf at Selborne Park	(Brazil) Adilson da Silva (3)	198	−18	1 stroke	(Scotland) Doug McGuigan (South Africa) Daniel van Tonder	
7 Sep 2012	Vodacom Origins of Golf at Sishen	(South Africa) Trevor Fisher Jnr (3)	202	−14	Playoff	(South Africa) Christiaan Basson	
28 Sep 2012	Vodacom Origins of Golf Final	(South Africa) Branden Grace	209	−10	3 strokes	(South Africa) Allan Versfeld	

== 2013 season ==
Date	Tournament	Winner	Score	To par	Margin of victory	Runner(s)-up	Ref.
7 Jun 2013	Vodacom Origins of Golf at Simola	(South Africa) Jacques Blaauw	204	−12	1 stroke	(South Africa) PH McIntyre (South Africa) Neil Schietekat (South Africa) Daniel van Tonder	
28 Jun 2013	Vodacom Origins of Golf at Selborne Park	(South Africa) Jacques Blaauw (2)	198	−18	1 stroke	(South Africa) Daniel van Tonder	
9 Aug 2013	Vodacom Origins of Golf at Euphoria	(South Africa) Heinrich Bruiners	208	−8	5 strokes	(Brazil) Adilson da Silva (South Africa) Daniel van Tonder	
23 Aug 2013	Vodacom Origins of Golf at Langebaan	(South Africa) Jean Hugo (8)	202	−14	7 strokes	(South Africa) Merrick Bremner (South Africa) Andrew Curlewis (South Africa) Jbe' Kruger	
13 Sep 2013	Vodacom Origins of Golf at Parys	(South Africa) Andrew Curlewis (2)	209	−7	Playoff	(South Africa) Lyle Rowe	
11 Oct 2013	Vodacom Origins of Golf Final	(South Africa) J. J. Senekal	212	−4	Playoff	(South Africa) Titch Moore	

== 2014 season ==
Date	Tournament	Winner	Score	To par	Margin of victory	Runner(s)-up	Ref.
27 Jun 2014	Vodacom Origins of Golf at Euphoria	(South Africa) Daniel van Tonder	204	−12	1 stroke	(South Africa) Tyrone Ferreira	
25 Jul 2014	Vodacom Origins of Golf at Arabella	(South Africa) Jean Hugo (9)	137	−7	1 stroke	(South Africa) Rhys West	
1 Aug 2014	Vodacom Origins of Golf at St Francis	(South Africa) Keith Horne	207	−9	3 strokes	(South Africa) Erik van Rooyen	
5 Sep 2014	Vodacom Origins of Golf at Wild Coast Sun	(South Africa) Louis de Jager	208	−2	Playoff	(South Africa) Jaco Ahlers (South Africa) Haydn Porteous	
3 Oct 2014	Vodacom Origins of Golf at Vaal de Grace	(South Africa) PH McIntyre	200	−16	Playoff	(South Africa) Jake Roos	
31 Oct 2014	Vodacom Origins of Golf Final	(South Africa) Keith Horne (2)	203	−13	5 strokes	(South Africa) Andrew Curlewis	

== 2015 season ==
Date	Tournament	Winner	Score	To par	Margin of victory	Runner(s)-up	Ref.
6 Jun 2015	Vodacom Origins of Golf at Langebaan	(South Africa) Justin Harding (2)	208	−8	Playoff	(South Africa) Vaughn Groenewald	
22 Aug 2015	Vodacom Origins of Golf at San Lameer	(South Africa) Jean Hugo (10)	210	−6	1 stroke	(South Africa) Peter Karmis (South Africa) Derick Petersen	
12 Sep 2015	Vodacom Origins of Golf at Vaal de Grace	(South Africa) Jean Hugo (11)	195	−21	1 stroke	(South Africa) Jacques Kruyswijk	
3 Oct 2015	Vodacom Origins of Golf at St Francis	(South Africa) Christiaan Basson	205	−11	1 stroke	(Zimbabwe) Mark Williams	
24 Oct 2015	Vodacom Origins of Golf at Koro Creek	(South Africa) Dean Burmester	197	−19	5 strokes	(South Africa) Vaughn Groenewald	
13 Nov 2015	Vodacom Origins of Golf Final	(South Africa) Darren Fichardt (4)	202	−14	1 stroke	(South Africa) Tyrone Mordt (South Africa) Callum Mowat (South Africa) Jake Redman	

== 2016–17 season ==
Date	Tournament	Winner	Score	To par	Margin of victory	Runner(s)-up	Ref.
30 Jul 2016	Vodacom Origins of Golf at Wild Coast Sun	(Zambia) Madalitso Muthiya	199	−11	2 strokes	(South Africa) Hennie du Plessis (South Africa) Ockie Strydom	
20 Aug 2016	Vodacom Origins of Golf at Arabella	(South Africa) Vaughn Groenewald (2)	207	−9	1 stroke	(Kenya) Stefan Engell Andersen	
10 Sep 2016	Vodacom Origins of Golf at Sishen	(South Africa) Jacques Blaauw (3)	206	−10	Playoff	(South Africa) Theunis Spangenberg	
1 Oct 2016	Vodacom Origins of Golf at Simola	(South Africa) Justin Harding (3)	202	−14	1 stroke	(South Africa) Ockie Strydom	
22 Oct 2016	Vodacom Origins of Golf at Euphoria	(South Africa) Jaco Ahlers (2)	207	−9	3 strokes	(South Africa) Jacques Kruyswijk	
5 Nov 2016	Vodacom Origins of Golf Final	(Zimbabwe) Mark Williams	205	−11	2 strokes	(South Africa) Christiaan Bezuidenhout	

== 2017–18 season ==
Date	Tournament	Winner	Score	To par	Margin of victory	Runner(s)-up	Ref.
29 Jul 2017	Vodacom Origins of Golf at Highland Gate	(Scotland) Doug McGuigan	206	−10	1 stroke	(South Africa) Brandon Stone	
19 Aug 2017	Vodacom Origins of Golf at Arabella	(South Africa) Keith Horne (3)	210	−6	3 strokes	(South Africa) Jaco Ahlers (South Africa) Keenan Davidse (South Africa) Titch Moore	
2 Sep 2017	Vodacom Origins of Golf at Zimbali	(South Africa) Jared Harvey	204	−12	8 strokes	(South Africa) Louis de Jager	
23 Sep 2017	Vodacom Origins of Golf at St Francis	(Scotland) Doug McGuigan (2)	203	−13	2 strokes	(South Africa) Hennie du Plessis	
14 Oct 2017	Vodacom Origins of Golf at Sishen	(South Africa) Hennie du Plessis	204	−12	Playoff	(South Africa) Ockie Strydom	
4 Nov 2017	Vodacom Origins of Golf Final	(South Africa) Jaco Prinsloo	200	−16	1 stroke	(South Africa) Ockie Strydom	

== 2018–19 season ==
Date	Tournament	Winner	Score	To par	Margin of victory	Runner(s)-up	Ref.
18 Aug 2018	Vodacom Origins of Golf at Zebula	(South Africa) Zander Lombard	206	−10	Playoff	(South Africa) Jake Roos	
1 Sep 2018	Vodacom Origins of Golf at Selborne Park	(Greece) Peter Karmis	202	−14	4 strokes	(South Africa) Jacques Blaauw	
16 Sep 2018	Vodacom Origins of Golf at Arabella	(South Africa) Neil Schietekat	205	−11	1 stroke	(South Africa) Louis de Jager	
29 Sep 2018	Vodacom Origins of Golf at St Francis	(South Africa) Alex Haindl	204	−12	1 stroke	(South Africa) Jake Roos	
20 Oct 2018	Vodacom Origins of Golf at Parys	(South Africa) Garth Mulroy (2)	206	−10	1 stroke	(England) Chris Cannon (Sweden) Fredrik From	
3 Nov 2018	Vodacom Origins of Golf Final	(England) Steve Surry	210	−6	1 stroke	(South Africa) Derick Petersen	

== 2019–20 season ==
Date	Tournament	Winner	Score	To par	Margin of victory	Runner(s)-up	Ref.
24 Aug 2019	Vodacom Origins of Golf at Sishen	(South Africa) Ockie Strydom	200	−16	6 strokes	(South Africa) Thriston Lawrence	
28 Sep 2019	Vodacom Origins of Golf at Humewood	(South Africa) Merrick Bremner	197	−19	5 strokes	(Sweden) Jonathan Ågren (South Africa) Ruan Conradie (South Africa) Clinton Grobler	
5 Oct 2019	Vodacom Origins of Golf at Stellenbosch	(South Africa) Thriston Lawrence	201	−15	1 stroke	(South Africa) Deon Germishuys (South Africa) Riekus Nortje (South Africa) J. J. Senekal (South Africa) Jean-Paul Strydom	
19 Oct 2019	Vodacom Origins of Golf at Selborne Park	(South Africa) Jaco Ahlers (3)	201	−15	2 strokes	(South Africa) Ockie Strydom	
2 Nov 2019	Vodacom Origins of Golf Final	(South Africa) George Coetzee (3)	196	−20	3 strokes	(South Africa) M. J. Viljoen	

== 2020–21 season ==
No tournaments took place due to the COVID-19 pandemic.

== 2021–22 season ==
Date	Tournament	Winner	Score	To par	Margin of victory	Runner(s)-up	Ref.
6 Aug 2021	Vodacom Origins of Golf at De Zalze	(South Africa) George Coetzee (4)	198	−18	3 strokes	(South Africa) Jaco Ahlers (South Africa) Tristen Strydom	
28 Aug 2021	Vodacom Origins of Golf at Sishen	(South Africa) Alex Haindl (2)	213	−3	1 stroke	(Greece) Peter Karmis	
18 Sep 2021	Vodacom Origins of Golf at Mount Edgecombe	(South Africa) Louis Albertse	201	−9	1 stroke	(South Africa) CJ du Plessis	
2 Oct 2021	Vodacom Origins of Golf at Humewood	(South Africa) Daniel Greene	211	−5	Playoff	(South Africa) Tristen Strydom	
30 Jan 2022	Vodacom Origins of Golf Final	(South Africa) Martin Rohwer	203	−13	2 strokes	(South Africa) Tristen Strydom	

== 2022–23 season ==
Date	Tournament	Winner	Score	To par	Margin of victory	Runner(s)-up	Ref.
6 Aug 2022	Vodacom Origins of Golf at De Zalze	(South Africa) George Coetzee (5)	195	−21	2 strokes	(England) Joe Long	
27 Aug 2022	Vodacom Origins of Golf at Highland Gate	(South Africa) Anthony Michael	206	−10	1 stroke	(South Africa) Wynand Dingle (South Africa) Herman Loubser	
17 Sep 2022	Vodacom Origins of Golf at San Lameer	(South Africa) Wynand Dingle	200	−16	1 stroke	(South Africa) Jaco Prinsloo	
1 Oct 2022	Vodacom Origins of Golf at St Francis	(South Africa) Ruan Korb	203	−13	2 strokes	(South Africa) Ockie Strydom	
30 Oct 2022	Vodacom Origins of Golf Final	(South Africa) Combrinck Smit	280	−8	Playoff	(South Africa) Jake Redman	

== 2023–24 season ==
Date	Tournament	Winner	Score	To par	Margin of victory	Runner-up	Ref.
13 Aug 2023	Vodacom Origins of Golf at Zebula	(South Africa) Jacques Kruyswijk	203	−13	1 stroke	(South Africa) Heinrich Bruiners	
17 Sep 2023	VOG Western Cape	(South Africa) Kyle Barker	203	−10	Playoff	(South Africa) Pieter Moolman	
22 Oct 2023	VOG KZN	(South Africa) Pieter Moolman	208	−2	Playoff	(South Africa) Ethan Smith	
5 Nov 2023	Vodacom Origins of Golf Final	(South Africa) Neil Schietekat	273	−15	2 strokes	(South Africa) Jacques P. de Villiers	

== 2024–25 season ==
Date	Tournament	Winner	Score	To par	Margin of victory	Runner-up	Ref.
18 Aug 2024	Vodacom Origins of Golf at Highland Gate	(South Africa) Jean Hugo (12)	203	−13	1 stroke	(South Africa) Jonathan Broomhead	
22 Sep 2024	Vodacom Origins of Golf at Sishen	(South Africa) Yurav Premlall	205	−11	1 stroke	(South Africa) Martin Vorster	
13 Oct 2024	Vodacom Origins of Golf at Wild Coast Sun	(South Africa) Jonathan Broomhead	199	−11	Playoff	(South Africa) Luke Brown	
17 Nov 2024	Vodacom Origins of Golf Final	(South Africa) Dean Burmester (2)	260	−28	7 strokes	(South Africa) Jean Hugo	

== 2025–26 season ==
Date	Tournament	Winner	Score	To par	Margin of victory	Runner(s)-up	Ref.
17 Aug 2025	Vodacom Origins of Golf at Parys	(South Africa) Herman Loubser	208	−8	Playoff	(South Africa) Yurav Premlall	
14 Sep 2025	Vodacom Origins of Golf at Gowrie Farm	(South Africa) Haydn Porteous	135	−7	1 stroke	(Australia) Austin Bautista (South Africa) Estiaan Conradie (South Africa) Luke Jerling (Germany) Allen John (South Africa) Herman Loubser (South Africa) Kyle McClatchie (South Africa) Daniel van Tonder	
28 Sep 2025	Vodacom Origins of Golf at Devonvale	(South Africa) Jacques Kruyswijk (2)	203	−10	Playoff	(South Africa) George Coetzee	
23 Nov 2025	Vodacom Origins of Golf Final	(South Africa) Casey Jarvis	264	−24	Playoff	(South Africa) Barend Botha	
