= Zambia Open =

Golf tournament

Mopani Zambia Open
Tournament information
- Location: Kitwe, Zambia
- Established: 1972
- Course: Nkana Golf Club
- Par: 72
- Length: 7,185 yards (6,570 m)
- Tours: Sunshine Tour; Challenge Tour; Safari Circuit
- Format: Stroke play
- Prize fund: US$150,000
- Month played: June

Tournament record score
- Aggregate: 270 Marc Cayeux (2002)
- To par: −22 as above

Current champion
- (Zimbabwe) Stuart Krog

Location map
- Location in Zambia

The Zambia Open is a men's professional golf tournament played in Zambia, that has been part of the Sunshine Tour since 1996, and was co-sanctioned by the European-based Challenge Tour from 2001 to 2004. It was also an event on the Challenge Tour between 1991 and 1993, having previously part of the now defunct Safari Circuit.

== History ==
Lusaka Golf Club has traditionally hosted the Zambia Open, but in 2005 a disagreement with the then sponsors, Stanbic, resulted in the cancellation of the tournament, with a new venue being found for the following year. Under a new sponsorship agreement, the 2008 tournament was held at Chainama Hills Golf Club for the first time, with a prize fund of 750,000 rand. From 2006 to 2010, it was contested as a 54-hole tournament. In 2011, it returned to being played over four rounds, 72 holes.

Former winners include 1991 Masters Tournament champion Ian Woosnam and fellow European Ryder Cup players Christy O'Connor Jnr, Sam Torrance, Gordon J. Brand, Tommy Horton and Brian Barnes.

== Winners ==
Year	Tour(s) (Note: AFR − Sunshine Tour; CHA − Challenge Tour; SAF − Safari Circuit.)	Winner	Score	To par	Margin of victory	Runner(s)-up	Venue	Ref.
Mopani Zambia Open
2026	AFR	(Zimbabwe) Stuart Krog	283	−5	1 stroke	(South Africa) Jason Roets	Nkana	
2025	AFR	(South Africa) Samuel Simpson	277	−11	1 stroke	(South Africa) Herman Loubser	Nkana	
2024	AFR	(South Africa) M. J. Viljoen	272	−16	6 strokes	(Zambia) Dayne Moore	Nkana	
Zambia Open
2021–2023: No tournament
2020	AFR	No tournament due to the COVID-19 pandemic						
Mopani Redpath Greendoor Logistics Zambia Open
2019	AFR	(South Africa) Daniel van Tonder	283	−5	1 stroke	(South Africa) Callum Mowat	Nkana	
Mopani Redpath Zambia Open
2018	AFR	(South Africa) Rourke van der Spuy	272	−16	4 strokes	(South Africa) Justin Harding	Nkana	
2017	AFR	(South Africa) Riekus Nortje	270	−18	2 strokes	(South Africa) Ockie Strydom	Nkana	
KCM Zambia Open
2016	AFR	(South Africa) Jaco Ahlers	271	−17	Playoff	(South Africa) Jacques Blaauw	Nchanga	
Mopani/Redpath Zambia Open
2015	AFR	(England) Ross McGowan	275	−13	2 strokes	(South Africa) Daniel van Tonder	Nkana	
Mopani Copper Mines Zambia Open
2014	AFR	(South Africa) Wallie Coetsee	273	−15	1 stroke	(South Africa) Justin Harding (South Africa) Daniel van Tonder	Nkana	
Zambia Sugar Open
2013	AFR	(Brazil) Adilson da Silva (2)	281	−11	1 stroke	(South Africa) Martin du Toit (South Africa) Alex Haindl	Lusaka	
Indo Zambia Bank Zambia Open
2012	AFR	(South Africa) Justin Harding	280	−12	2 strokes	(South Africa) Divan van den Heever	Lusaka	
KCM Zambia Open
2011	AFR	(Scotland) Doug McGuigan	272	−16	Playoff	(South Africa) Jean Hugo	Nchanga	
Zambia Open
2010	AFR	(Brazil) Adilson da Silva	202	−17	4 strokes	(South Africa) Johan du Buisson	Ndola	
2009	AFR	(South Africa) Jbe' Kruger	204	−15	3 strokes	(South Africa) Titch Moore	Ndola	
Chainama Hills Zambia Open
2008	AFR	(South Africa) Tyrone Ferreira	208	−8	2 strokes	(South Africa) Charl Coetzee (South Africa) Divan van den Heever	Chainama Hills	
Finance Bank Zambia Open
2007	AFR	(South Africa) Steve Basson (2)	206	−13	1 stroke	(South Africa) Lindani Ndwandwe	Ndola	
Stanbic Zambia Open
2006	AFR	(South Africa) Steve Basson	207	−9	3 strokes	(Zambia) Madalitso Muthiya (South Africa) Chris Williams	Nchanga	
2005: No tournament
2004	AFR, CHA	(South Africa) Michael Kirk	274	−18	3 strokes	(South Africa) Leonard Loxton	Lusaka	
2003	AFR, CHA	(Sweden) Johan Edfors	206	−13	4 strokes	(South Africa) Michael Kirk	Lusaka	
2002	AFR, CHA	(Zimbabwe) Marc Cayeux (2)	270	−22	2 strokes	(South Africa) Andre Cruse (South Africa) Richard Sterne	Lusaka	
2001	AFR, CHA	(England) Mark Foster	278	−14	1 stroke	(England) Stuart Little (South Africa) Jaco Olver	Lusaka	
2000	AFR	(Republic of Ireland) James Loughnane (2)	274	−18	1 stroke	(South Africa) Bradford Vaughan	Lusaka	
Zambia Open
1999: No tournament
1998	AFR	(Zimbabwe) Marc Cayeux	273	−11	1 stroke	(England) Chris Davison (South Africa) Hennie Otto	Lusaka	
1997	AFR	(Republic of Ireland) James Loughnane	273	−19	1 stroke	(South Africa) Colin Sorour	Lusaka	
1996	AFR	(South Africa) Desvonde Botes	208	−8	1 stroke	(South Africa) Neil Homann	Ndola	
1994–1995: No tournament
1993	CHA	(England) Peter Harrison	283	−9	Playoff	(Argentina) José Cantero (Sweden) Olle Nordberg (France) Frédéric Regard	Lusaka	
1992	CHA	(England) Jeremy Robinson	284	−8	Playoff	(Sweden) Mathias Grönberg (England) Mark Nichols	Lusaka	
1991	CHA	(England) David R. Jones	285	−7	1 stroke	(England) Paul Carrigill (England) Philip Golding	Lusaka	
1990	SAF	(England) Gordon J. Brand	284	−8	4 strokes	(England) Philip Golding (Scotland) Craig Maltman	Lusaka	
1989	SAF	(Scotland) Craig Maltman	215 (Note: Shortened to 54 holes due to rain.)	E	2 strokes	(England) Mark Roe	Lusaka	
1988	SAF	(Wales) David Llewellyn	280	−12	1 stroke	(England) Richard Fish	Lusaka	
1987	SAF	(England) Paul Carrigill	285	−7	Playoff	(Scotland) Mike Miller	Lusaka	
1986	SAF	(England) Gary Cullen	283	−9	Playoff	(Republic of Ireland) Eamonn Darcy	Lusaka	
1985	SAF	(Wales) Ian Woosnam	282	−10	2 strokes	(England) Gordon J. Brand (Scotland) Brian Marchbank	Lusaka	
1984	SAF	(England) Carl Mason	280	−12	2 strokes	(England) Roger Chapman	Lusaka	
1983	SAF	(United States) Bill Calfee	280	−12	Playoff	(Republic of Ireland) Eamonn Darcy	Lusaka	
1982	SAF	(England) Brian Waites	276	−16	4 strokes	(Scotland) Ken Brown	Lusaka	
1981	SAF	(Scotland) Brian Barnes (2)	276	−16	1 stroke	(England) Howard Clark (England) John Morgan	Lusaka	
1980	SAF	(Scotland) Ewen Murray	282	−10	3 strokes	(Scotland) Brian Barnes	Lusaka	
1979	SAF	(Scotland) Brian Barnes	280	−12	3 strokes	(Scotland) Sandy Lyle	Ndola	
1978	SAF	(England) Peter Townsend	274	−14	4 strokes	(Scotland) Brian Barnes	Lusaka	
1977	SAF	(England) Tommy Horton	284	−8	2 strokes	(Scotland) Brian Barnes (Scotland) Ken Brown (England) Gary Cullen (Republic of Ireland) Christy O'Connor Snr (England) Brian Waites	Ndola	
1976		(England) Pete Cowen	286	−6	1 stroke	(Australia) Jack Newton	Lusaka	
1975		(Scotland) Sam Torrance	280	−12	Playoff	(Scotland) Brian Barnes	Ndola	
1974		(Republic of Ireland) Christy O'Connor Jnr	282	−10	Playoff	(England) Mike Ingham (Northern Ireland) Eddie Polland	Mufulira	
1973		(Wales) Craig Defoy (2)	281	−7	3 strokes	(England) David Emery (England) Mike Ingham (England) Peter Tupling	Lusaka	
1972		(Wales) Craig Defoy	272	−20	7 strokes	(England) Malcolm Gregson	Ndola	

== See also ==
- Open golf tournament
