= Marc Cayeux =

Zimbabwean professional golfer

Personal information
- Full name: Marc Elton Cayeux
- Nationality: Zimbabwe
- Born: 22 February 1978 (age 48) Lancaster, England
- Height: 5 ft 11 in (1.80 m)
- Spouse: Jana
- Children: 2

Career
- Sport: Golf
- Turned professional: 1996
- Current tour: Sunshine Tour
- Former tour: European Tour
- Professional wins: 11

Number of wins by tour
- Sunshine Tour: 9
- Challenge Tour: 3

Best results in major championships
- Masters Tournament: DNP
- PGA Championship: DNP
- U.S. Open: DNP
- The Open Championship: CUT: 2009

Marc Elton Cayeux (born 22 February 1978) is a Zimbabwean professional golfer.

== Early life ==
Cayeux's father is South African and his mother English. He was born in Lancaster, England and raised in Zimbabwe, leaving school at 14 to pursue a career in golf. He is a Zimbabwean/British dual national, but plays golf as a Zimbabwean.

== Professional career ==
Cayeux finished fourth on the Challenge Tour in 2004, to gain exemption to the full European Tour for 2005. That year he finished 82nd on the Order of Merit, with a best of third in the Scandinavian Masters by Carlsberg. He also won the Vodacom Tour Championship on the Sunshine Tour, on his way to fifth in the end of season standings. That win gained him entry to the WGC-NEC Invitational, where he played with World Number 1 and eventual winner Tiger Woods in the first round.

A less successful season in 2006 saw Cayeux return to the Sunshine Tour the following year, where he had four top three finishes on his way to eighth in the Order of Merit. In 2008, he won the Nashua Masters, and regained his place on the European Tour through the qualifying school.

In September 2010, Cayeux was involved in an automobile accident that resulted in serious injuries to himself and was fatal to the other driver involved. He was not expected to play until early 2011.

== Professional wins (11) ==
=== Sunshine Tour wins (9) ===
Legend
Tour Championships (1)
Other Sunshine Tour (8)

No.	Date	Tournament	Winning score	Margin of victory	Runner(s)-up
1	22 Nov 1998	Zambia Open	−11 (68-70-67-68=273)	1 stroke	(England) Chris Davison, (South Africa) Hennie Otto
2	21 Feb 1999	Stenham Royal Swazi Sun Open	−22 (67-68-65-66=266)	3 strokes	(Zimbabwe) Mark McNulty
3	13 May 2000	Pietersburg Classic	−14 (68-70-64=202)	4 strokes	(South Africa) Dean van Staden
4	31 Mar 2001	FNB Botswana Open	−16 (66-63-68=197)	2 strokes	(South Africa) Hendrik Buhrmann, (South Africa) Grant Muller
5	10 Mar 2002	Stanbic Zambia Open^{1} (2)	−22 (69-66-65-70=270)	2 strokes	(South Africa) André Cruse, (South Africa) Richard Sterne
6	10 May 2003	Limpopo Industrelek Classic	−19 (68-64-65=197)	3 strokes	(South Africa) Tyrol Auret
7	27 Feb 2005	Vodacom Tour Championship	−20 (70-70-67-61=268)	6 strokes	(South Africa) Keith Horne
8	7 Oct 2007	Bearing Man Highveld Classic	−14 (71-69-62=202)	3 strokes	(South Africa) Ulrich van den Berg
9	3 Feb 2008	Nashua Masters	−12 (66-67-67-68=268)	2 strokes	(South Africa) Bradford Vaughan

^{1}Co-sanctioned by the Challenge Tour

Sunshine Tour playoff record (0–2)

No.	Year	Tournament	Opponent(s)	Result
1	2001	Bearing Man Highveld Classic	(South Africa) Justin Hobday	Lost to par on second extra hole
2	2007	Platinum Classic	(Brazil) Adilson da Silva, (South Africa) Louis Oosthuizen	Oosthuizen won with par on second extra hole da Silva eliminated by par on first hole

=== Challenge Tour wins (3) ===
No.	Date	Tournament	Winning score	Margin of victory	Runner(s)-up
1	10 Mar 2002	Stanbic Zambia Open^{1}	−22 (69-66-65-70=270)	2 strokes	(South Africa) André Cruse, (South Africa) Richard Sterne
2	21 Mar 2004	Kenya Open	−10 (65-63-75-67=270)	Playoff	(Sweden) Leif Westerberg
3	26 Sep 2004	Open de Toulouse	−12 (65-71-72-68=276)	Playoff	(Scotland) David Drysdale

^{1}Co-sanctioned by the Sunshine Tour

Challenge Tour playoff record (2–0)

No.	Year	Tournament	Opponent	Result
1	2004	Kenya Open	(Sweden) Leif Westerberg	Won with par on first extra hole
2	2004	Open de Toulouse	(Scotland) David Drysdale	Won with par on first extra hole

== Results in major championships ==
Tournament	2009
The Open Championship	CUT

Did not play

CUT = missed the halfway cut
Note: Cayeux only played in The Open Championship.

== Results in World Golf Championships ==
Tournament	2005
Match Play	
Championship	
Invitational	T49

Did not play

"T" = Tied

== Team appearances ==
- Eisenhower Trophy (representing Zimbabwe): 1996

== See also ==
- 2008 European Tour Qualifying School graduates
