= Warren Abery =

South African professional golfer

Personal information
- Full name: Warren Abery
- Nationality: South Africa
- Born: 28 June 1973 (age 53) Durban, South Africa
- Height: 1.73 m (5 ft 8 in)
- Weight: 70 kg (154 lb; 11 st 0 lb)

Career
- Sport: Golf
- Turned professional: 1997
- Current tour: Sunshine Tour
- Former tour: European Tour
- Professional wins: 8

Number of wins by tour
- Sunshine Tour: 7
- Other: 1

Best results in major championships
- Masters Tournament: DNP
- PGA Championship: DNP
- U.S. Open: DNP
- The Open Championship: CUT: 2006

Warren Abery (born 28 June 1973) is a South African professional golfer. He currently plays on the Sunshine Tour where he won seven times between 1998 and 2011.

== Early life ==
Abery was born in Durban, South Africa. He won the 1995 South African Amateur.

== Professional career ==
In 1997, Abery turned professional and the same year he joined the Sunshine Tour, where he found immediate success. He gained a place on the European Tour in 2006 and 2012 via qualifying school but was unable to retain his card.

== Personal life ==
Abery resides in Ballito.

== Amateur wins ==
- 1994 Natal Amateur
- 1995 Natal Amateur, South African Amateur

== Professional wins (8) ==
=== Sunshine Tour wins (7) ===
| No. | Date | Tournament | Winning score | Margin of victory | Runner(s)-up |
|---|---|---|---|---|---|
| 1 | 4 Sep 1998 | Absa Bank Corporate Challenge | −10 (67-67-72=206) | 3 strokes | (South Africa) Brett Liddle, (Greece) Pelop Panagopoulos, (South Africa) Bryan Prytz |
| 2 | 10 Nov 2001 | Graceland Challenge | −11 (69-70-66=205) | 3 strokes | (South Africa) Richard Sterne |
| 3 | 20 Feb 2005 | Telkom PGA Championship | −15 (68-68-68-69=273) | 1 stroke | (South Africa) Charl Schwartzel, (South Africa) Jaco van Zyl |
| 4 | 5 Feb 2006 | Nashua Masters | −15 (67-63-67-68=265) | 2 strokes | (Scotland) Doug McGuigan |
| 5 | 30 June 2007 | Nashua Golf Challenge | −9 (69-67-71=207) | 4 strokes | (Brazil) Adilson da Silva |
| 6 | 4 Nov 2010 | Nashua Masters (2) | −13 (66-67-65-69=267) | 2 strokes | (South Africa) Oliver Bekker, (South Africa) Branden Grace, (South Africa) Alex Haindl |
| 7 | 10 Nov 2011 | Nedbank Affinity Cup | −11 (70-65-70=205) | 2 strokes | (South Africa) Andrew Curlewis, (South Africa) Prinavin Nelson |

Sunshine Tour playoff record (0–3)

| No. | Year | Tournament | Opponent | Result |
|---|---|---|---|---|
| 1 | 2003 | Canon Classic | (South Africa) Tyrol Auret | |
| 2 | 2006 | Limpopo Classic | (South Africa) Bradford Vaughan | |
| 3 | 2007 | Vodacom Origins of Golf at Fancourt | (Brazil) Adilson da Silva | Lost to birdie on second extra hole |

=== Other wins (1) ===
- 2005 Sun City Touring Pro-Am

== Results in major championships ==
| Tournament | 2006 |
|---|---|
| The Open Championship | CUT |

CUT = missed the halfway cut
Note: Abery only played in The Open Championship.

== Results in World Golf Championships ==
| Tournament | 2005 |
|---|---|
| Match Play | |
| Championship | 69 |
| Invitational | |

Did not play

== Team appearances ==
Amateur

- Eisenhower Trophy (representing South Africa): 1996

== See also ==
- 2005 European Tour Qualifying School graduates
- 2011 European Tour Qualifying School graduates
