= Platinum Classic =

Tournament information
- Location: Mooinooi, South Africa
- Established: 1995
- Course: Mooinooi Golf Club
- Par: 72
- Length: 6,948 yards (6,353 m)
- Tour: Sunshine Tour
- Format: Stroke play
- Prize fund: R 500,000
- Month played: September
- Final year: 2013

Tournament record score
- Aggregate: 196 Jean Hugo (2010)
- To par: −20 as above

Final champion
- (South Africa) Neil Schietekat
- Location in South Africa Location in North West

The Platinum Classic was a golf tournament on the Sunshine Tour. It was founded in 1995, and was played at the nine-hole Mooinooi Golf Club, North West Province, South Africa, although the first event had to be moved to Rustenburg when the greens at Mooinooi were vandalised.

The tournament was traditionally held in October but was moved to March in 2012 and September in 2013. The prize fund was R500,000.

== Winners ==
Year	Winner	Score	To par	Margin of victory	Runner(s)-up
Platinum Classic
2013	(South Africa) Neil Schietekat	201	−15	3 strokes	(South Africa) Jaco Ahlers
2012	(South Africa) Jake Roos	202	−14	Playoff	(South Africa) Anthony Michael (South Africa) Chris Swanepoel
2011	(South Africa) Hennie Otto	199	−17	2 strokes	(South Africa) Darren Fichardt
2010	(South Africa) Jean Hugo	196	−20	2 strokes	(South Africa) Michiel Bothma
2009	(South Africa) Darren Fichardt	201	−15	1 stroke	(South Africa) Titch Moore
2008	(South Africa) Thomas Aiken	197	−19	5 strokes	(South Africa) Desvonde Botes (South Africa) Nic Henning (South Africa) Keith Horne
2007	(South Africa) Louis Oosthuizen	205	−11	Playoff	(Zimbabwe) Marc Cayeux (Brazil) Adilson da Silva
2006	(South Africa) Vaughn Groenewald	202	−14	1 stroke	(South Africa) Thomas Aiken
2005	(South Africa) Jaco van Zyl	198	−18	Playoff	(South Africa) Grant Muller
2004	(South Africa) Titch Moore (2)	200	−16	3 strokes	(South Africa) Hennie Otto
2003	(Scotland) Doug McGuigan	199	−17	1 stroke	(South Africa) Ashley Roestoff
2002	(South Africa) Titch Moore	198	−18	5 strokes	(Scotland) Doug McGuigan
2001	(South Africa) Roger Wessels	201	−15	4 strokes	(South Africa) Des Terblanche
2000	(South Africa) Desvonde Botes (2)	202	−14	1 stroke	(South Africa) Roger Wessels
1999	(South Africa) Bobby Lincoln (2)	201	−15	Playoff	(South Africa) Callie Swart
1998 (Nov)	(South Africa) Bobby Lincoln	202	−14	3 strokes	(South Africa) Ashley Roestoff
1998 (Jan)	(South Africa) Desvonde Botes	199	−17	3 strokes	(South Africa) Richard Kaplan
1997: No tournament
1996	(South Africa) Mark Murless	204	−12	2 strokes	(South Africa) Dean van Staden
Rustenburg Classic
1995	(South Africa) Brett Liddle	208	−8	2 strokes	(South Africa) Steve van Vuuren
