= Jean Hugo (golfer) =

South African professional golfer (born 1975)

Personal information
- Full name: Victor Jean Hugo
- Nationality: South Africa
- Born: 3 December 1975 (age 50) Stellenbosch, South Africa
- Height: 1.75 m (5 ft 9 in)
- Weight: 85 kg (187 lb; 13.4 st)

Career
- Sport: Golf
- Turned professional: 1999
- Current tours: Sunshine Tour; European Senior Tour
- Former tours: European Tour; Challenge Tour
- Professional wins: 27

Number of wins by tour
- Sunshine Tour: 22
- Challenge Tour: 1
- European Senior Tour: 3
- Other: 1

Best results in major championships
- Masters Tournament: DNP
- PGA Championship: DNP
- U.S. Open: DNP
- The Open Championship: CUT: 1999, 2001, 2010

Achievements and awards
- Southern Africa Tour Rookie of the Year: 1999–2000
- Sunshine Tour Players' Player of the Year: 2011

Victor Jean Hugo (born 3 December 1975) is a South African professional golfer.

== Career ==
Hugo matriculated at Paul Roos Gymnasium in Stellenbosch, South Africa in 1994. Three years later he graduated with a bachelor of arts degree from University of Stellenbosch. He is the youngest son of organic chemist Professor Victor Hugo and Esme Hugo who were both active in sport and sport administration. He also excelled in rugby and cricket before choosing golf as a career.

Hugo played on the European Tour and had his best season in 2001 when he finished 34th on the Order of Merit.

== Amateur wins ==
- 1998 South African International Amateur Match-play Championship
- 1999 South African Amateur Stroke Play Championship

== Professional wins (27) ==
=== Sunshine Tour wins (22) ===
No.	Date	Tournament	Winning score	Margin of victory	Runner(s)-up
1	28 Nov 1999	Zimbabwe Open	−17 (62-66-65-68=271)	2 strokes	(South Africa) Ulrich van den Berg
2	29 Oct 2000	Western Cape Classic	−9 (70-65-72=207)	1 stroke	(South Africa) Titch Moore, (South Africa) Phillip Sanderson, (Namibia) Schalk van der Merwe
3	21 Apr 2006	Vodacom Origins of Golf at Arabella	−8 (71-70-67=208)	5 strokes	(South Africa) Chris Williams
4	29 Apr 2006	SAA Pro-Am Invitational (1st)	−16 (68-64-68=200)	2 strokes	(South Africa) Anton Haig
5	4 Feb 2007	Nashua Masters	−11 (64-67-68-70=269)	Playoff	(South Africa) Titch Moore
6	10 May 2008	Samsung Royal Swazi Sun Open	56 pts (16-26-13-1=56)	6 points	(South Africa) Neil Schietekat
7	30 May 2008	Vodacom Origins of Golf (2) at Selborne	−13 (69-66-68=203)	2 strokes	(South Africa) Bradford Vaughan
8	16 Apr 2010	Vodacom Origins of Golf (3) at Gardener Ross	−15 (69-70-62=201)	1 stroke	(South Africa) Charl Schwartzel
9	17 Sep 2010	Vodacom Origins of Golf (4) at Stellenbosch	−17 (66-67-66=199)	3 strokes	(South Africa) Shaun Norris
10	30 Oct 2010	Platinum Classic	−20 (66-64-66=196)	2 strokes	(South Africa) Michiel Bothma
11	28 May 2011	Vodacom Origins of Golf (5) at Pretoria	−11 (72-66-67=205)	3 strokes	(South Africa) George Coetzee, (Brazil) Adilson da Silva
12	29 Jul 2011	Vodacom Origins of Golf (6) at Simola	−15 (68-69-64=201)	Playoff	(South Africa) Peter Karmis
13	23 Sep 2011	Vodacom Origins of Golf Final (7)	−8 (70-72-66=208)	2 strokes	(South Africa) Louis de Jager, (South Africa) Lyle Rowe
14	23 Aug 2013	Vodacom Origins of Golf (8) at Langebaan	−14 (72-63-67=202)	7 strokes	(South Africa) Merrick Bremner, (South Africa) Andrew Curlewis, (South Africa) Jbe' Kruger
15	25 Jul 2014	Vodacom Origins of Golf (9) at Arabella	−7 (68-69=137) (Note: Shortened to 36 holes due to weather.)	1 stroke	(South Africa) Rhys West
16	22 Aug 2015	Vodacom Origins of Golf (10) at San Lameer	−6 (67-69-74=210)	1 stroke	(South Africa) Peter Karmis, (South Africa) Derick Petersen
17	12 Sep 2015	Vodacom Origins of Golf (11) at Vaal de Grace	−21 (65-66-64=195)	1 stroke	(South Africa) Jacques Kruyswijk
18	7 Mar 2018	Steyn City Team Championship (with (South Africa) Hennie du Plessis)	−23 (66-66-61=193)	1 stroke	(South Africa) Christiaan Bezuidenhout and (South Africa) Kyle McClatchie
19	11 Oct 2019	Sun Wild Coast Sun Challenge	−11 (60-65-74=199)	4 strokes	(South Africa) Hennie du Plessis, (South Africa) Clinton Grobler
20	18 Aug 2024	Vodacom Origins of Golf (12) at Highland Gate	−13 (66-67-70=203)	1 stroke	(South Africa) Jonathan Broomhead
21	15 Sep 2024	Bain's Whisky Ubunye Championship (with (South Africa) Ruan Korb)	−20 (65-69-67-73=264)	4 strokes	(South Africa) Jaco Ahlers and (South Africa) Michael Hollick, (South Africa) Trevor Fisher Jnr and (South Africa) Stefan Wears-Taylor
22	28 Aug 2026	Sunbet Challenge (Wild Coast Sun)	−8 (71-66-65=202)	1 stroke	(South Africa) Nikhil Rama

Sunshine Tour playoff record (2–2)

No.	Year	Tournament	Opponent	Result
1	2005	Vodacom Origins of Golf at Pretoria	(South Africa) Desvonde Botes	Lost to birdie on first extra hole
2	2007	Nashua Masters	(South Africa) Titch Moore	Won with par on first extra hole
3	2011	Vodacom Origins of Golf at Simola	(South Africa) Peter Karmis	Won with birdie on first extra hole
4	2011	KCM Zambia Open	(Scotland) Doug McGuigan	Lost to birdie on fifth extra hole

=== Challenge Tour wins (1) ===
No.	Date	Tournament	Winning score	Margin of victory	Runners-up
1	9 Jul 2000	Volvo Finnish Open	−15 (62-69-74-68=273)	5 strokes	(Sweden) Magnus Persson Atlevi, (Denmark) Nils Roerbaek-Petersen

=== Other wins (1) ===
- 2005 Wild Coast Sun Touring Pro-Am (South Africa)

=== European Senior Tour wins (3) ===
No.	Date	Tournament	Winning score	Margin of victory	Runner-up
1	4 Oct 2026	Reignwood Legends Championship	−13 (65-67-71=203)	3 strokes	(England) Matthew Cort
2	1 Nov 2026	Portugal Legends Championship	−20 (66-68-62=196)	6 strokes	(England) Greg Owen
3	8 Nov 2026	Champions UK plc European Senior Masters	−19 (66-69-65=200)	1 stroke	(England) Van Phillips

== Results in major championships ==
Tournament	1999	2000	2001	2002	2003	2004	2005	2006	2007	2008	2009	2010
The Open Championship	CUT		CUT									CUT

Note: Hugo only played in The Open Championship.

Did not play

CUT = missed the half-way cut

== Results in World Golf Championships ==
Tournament	2009
Match Play	
Championship	
Invitational	
Champions	73

Did not play

== Team appearances ==
Amateur

- Eisenhower Trophy (representing South Africa): 1998

== See also ==
- 2015 European Tour Qualifying School graduates
