= Keith Horne =

South African professional golfer

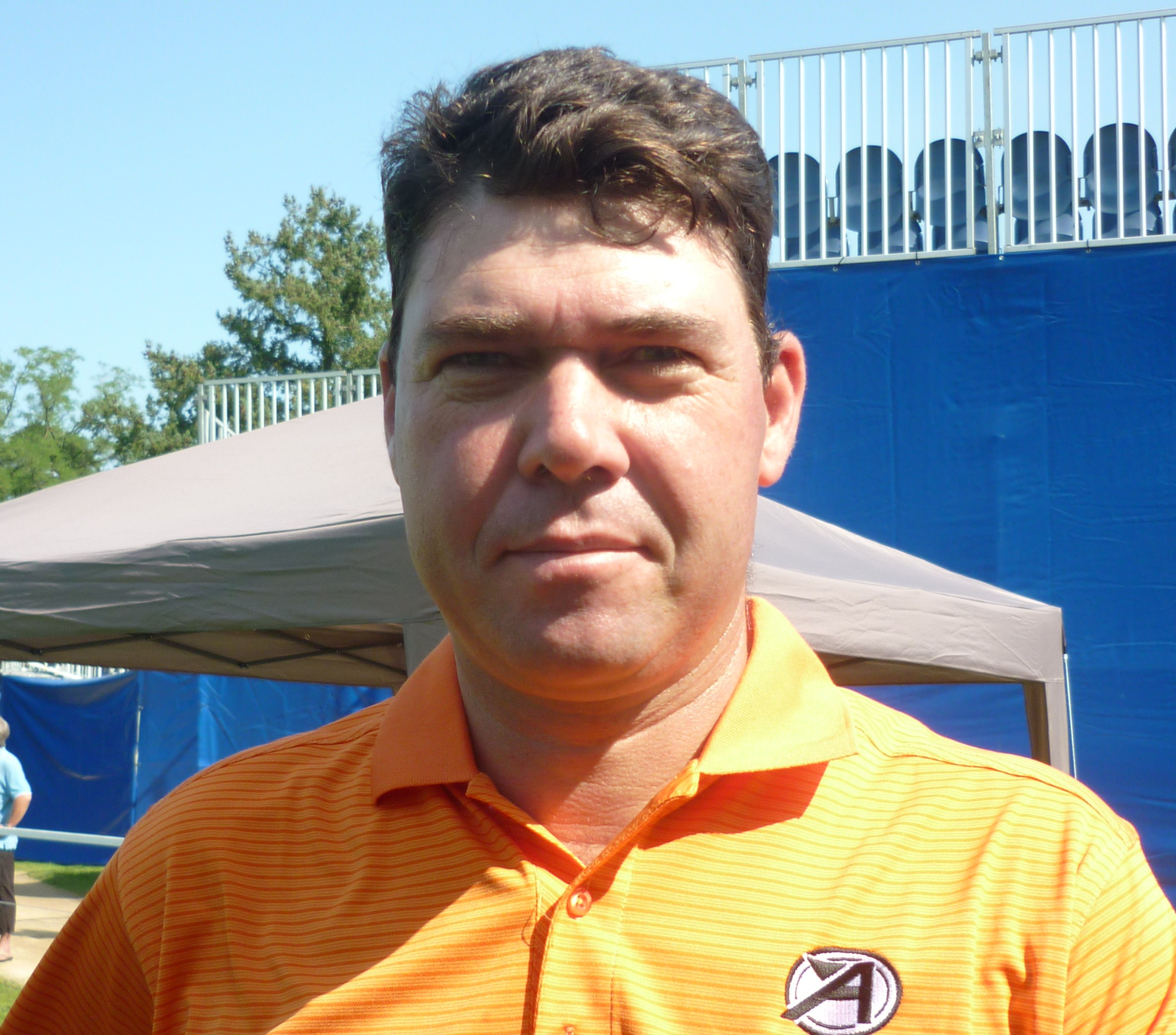

Personal information
- Full name: Keith Weller Horne
- Nationality: South Africa
- Born: 9 June 1971 (age 55) Durban, South Africa
- Height: 1.88 m (6 ft 2 in)
- Weight: 85 kg (187 lb; 13.4 st)
- Spouse: Karen Horne
- Children: 2

Career
- Sport: Golf
- Turned professional: 1996
- Current tours: Sunshine Tour; European Senior Tour
- Former tours: European Tour; Asian Tour
- Professional wins: 14

Number of wins by tour
- Sunshine Tour: 9
- European Senior Tour: 2
- Other: 3

Keith Weller Horne (born 9 June 1971) is a professional golfer from South Africa.

== Early life and amateur career ==
In 1971, Horne was born in Durban, South Africa. He graduated from Westville Boys' High School.

Horne had a successful amateur career. In 1993, Horne won a Silver Medal at the World Games in Spain.

== Professional career ==
In 1996, Horne turned professional. Horne immediately joined the local Sunshine Tour, the richest professional golf tour in South Africa. His first professional win came in 1998 at the Vodacom Series: Kwazulu Natal. After that, he had a few off-seasons until he won a few unofficial Pro-Ams in 2003. His second official win came in 2007 at the MTC Namibia PGA Championship. He won again a year later at the Nashua Golf Challenge. Horne also holds membership on the Asian Tour, where he has yet to win.

In 2010, a runner-up finish in the Joburg Open, and a top-10 finish at the Singapore Open, both events which are co-sanctioned with the European Tour meant that Horne earned enough to have a full European Tour membership for 2011.

In 2012, he picked up his fifth victory on the Sunshine Tour at the Telkom PGA Championship. He picked up two more wins in 2014, one in 2015 and another in 2017.

== Personal life ==
In 2000, Horne married Karen. He has two children, born in 2002 and 2007. He currently resides in Alberton, South Africa.

== Professional wins (14) ==
=== Sunshine Tour wins (9) ===
No.	Date	Tournament	Winning score	Margin of victory	Runner(s)-up
1	31 May 1998	Vodacom Series (Kwazulu-Natal)	−12 (68-68-68=204)	3 strokes	(South Africa) Chris Williams
2	20 Oct 2007	MTC Namibia PGA Championship	−18 (67-65-63=195)	5 strokes	(Scotland) Doug McGuigan, (South Africa) Hennie Otto, (South Africa) Ulrich van den Berg
3	17 May 2008	Nashua Golf Challenge	−6 (72-68-70=210)	Playoff	(South Africa) Nic Henning
4	9 May 2010	Investec Royal Swazi Open	47 pts (10-10-11-16=47)	1 point	(South Africa) Christiaan Basson
5	26 Feb 2012	Telkom PGA Championship	−19 (70-63-67-69=269)	3 strokes	(South Africa) Jaco Ahlers, (South Africa) Darren Fichardt, (South Africa) Alex Haindl
6	1 Aug 2014	Vodacom Origins of Golf at St Francis	−9 (65-71-71=207)	3 strokes	(South Africa) Erik van Rooyen
7	31 Oct 2014	Vodacom Origins of Golf Final (2)	−13 (65-71-67=203)	1 stroke	(South Africa) Ulrich van den Berg
8	7 Aug 2015	Sun City Challenge (2)	−13 (68-71-64=203)	5 strokes	(South Africa) Andrew Curlewis
9	19 Aug 2017	Vodacom Origins of Golf (3) at Arabella	−6 (69-69-72=210)	3 strokes	(South Africa) Jaco Ahlers, (South Africa) Keenan Davidse, (South Africa) Titch Moore

Sunshine Tour playoff record (1–2)

No.	Year	Tournament	Opponent	Result
1	2001	Royal Swazi Sun Classic	(South Africa) Titch Moore	Lost to bogey on second extra hole
2	2004	Vodacom Origins of Golf at Zimbali	(South Africa) Thomas Aiken	Lost to par on first extra hole
2	2008	Nashua Golf Challenge	(South Africa) Nic Henning	Won with par on second extra hole

=== Other wins (3) ===
- 2003 Wild Coast Sun Touring Pro-Am, Royal Swazi Sun Touring Pro-Am
- 2009 Klipdrift Gold Sun International Touring Pro-Am

=== European Senior Tour wins (2) ===
No.	Date	Tournament	Winning score	Margin of victory	Runner(s)-up
1	18 Aug 2024	Zambia Legends Championship	−18 (71-63-64=198)	3 strokes	(Brazil) Adilson da Silva
2	6 Jul 2025	Reignwood Legends Championship	−12 (68-68-68=204)	1 stroke	(Italy) Emanuele Canonica, (England) Matthew Cort, (Scotland) David Drysdale

European Senior Tour playoff record (0–1)

No.	Year	Tournament	Opponent	Result
1	2023	Riegler & Partner Legends	(Brazil) Adilson da Silva	Lost to birdie on first extra hole

== Results in World Golf Championships ==
Tournament	2011
Match Play	
Championship	
Invitational	
Champions	T46

Did not play

"T" = Tied

== See also ==
- List of African golfers
