= 2007 Sunshine Tour =

Golf tour season

2007 Sunshine Tour season
- Duration: 11 January 2007 – 16 December 2007
- Number of official events: 28
- Most wins: (South Africa) Louis Oosthuizen (3)
- Order of Merit: (South Africa) James Kingston
- Rookie of the Year: (England) Ross McGowan

The 2007 Sunshine Tour was the 37th season of the Sunshine Tour (formerly the Southern Africa Tour), the main professional golf tour in South Africa since it was formed in 1971.

== Schedule ==
The following table lists official events during the 2007 season.

| Date | Tournament | Location | Purse (R) | Winner (Note: The number in brackets after each winner's name is the number of Sunshine Tour events they had won up to and including that tournament. This information is only shown for Sunshine Tour members.) | OWGR points | Other tours (Note: ANZ − PGA Tour of Australasia; ASA − Asian Tour; EUR − European Tour.) | Notes |
|---|---|---|---|---|---|---|---|
| 14 Jan | Joburg Open | Gauteng | €1,000,000 | (Argentina) Ariel Cañete (n/a) | 20 | EUR | New tournament |
| 28 Jan | Dimension Data Pro-Am | North West | 1,600,000 | (South Africa) Louis Oosthuizen (2) | 14 | | Pro-Am |
| 4 Feb | Nashua Masters | Eastern Cape | 1,200,000 | (South Africa) Jean Hugo (5) | 14 | | |
| 18 Feb | Vodacom Championship | Gauteng | 2,200,000 | (South Africa) Richard Sterne (2) | 14 | | |
| 25 Feb | Telkom PGA Championship | Gauteng | 2,250,000 | (South Africa) Louis Oosthuizen (3) | 14 | | |
| 11 Mar | Mount Edgecombe Trophy | KwaZulu-Natal | 500,000 | (South Africa) Steve van Vuuren (7) | n/a | | |
| 1 Apr | Finance Bank Zambia Open | Zambia | 750,000 | (South Africa) Steve Basson (3) | n/a | | |
| 15 Apr | Eskom Power Cup | North West | 400,000 | (South Africa) Chris Swanepoel (1) | n/a | | |
| 20 Apr | Vodacom Origins of Golf at Arabella | Western Cape | 400,000 | (South Africa) Andrew Curlewis (1) | n/a | | |
| 5 May | Samsung Royal Swazi Sun Open | Swaziland | 600,000 | (South Africa) Des Terblanche (7) | n/a | | |
| 11 May | Vodacom Origins of Golf at Pretoria | Gauteng | 400,000 | (South Africa) Hennie Otto (7) | n/a | | |
| 19 May | Suncoast Classic | KwaZulu-Natal | 400,000 | (Brazil) Adilson da Silva (3) | n/a | | |
| 10 Jun | Lombard Insurance Classic | Swaziland | 350,000 | (South Africa) Peter Karmis (1) | n/a | | New tournament |
| 15 Jun | Vodacom Origins of Golf at Selborne | KwaZulu-Natal | 400,000 | (South Africa) George Coetzee (1) | n/a | | |
| 30 Jun | Nashua Golf Challenge | North West | 400,000 | (South Africa) Warren Abery (6) | n/a | | New tournament |
| 3 Aug | Vodacom Origins of Golf at Bloemfontein | Free State | 400,000 | (South Africa) Ulrich van den Berg (5) | n/a | | |
| 24 Aug | Vodacom Origins of Golf at Fancourt | Western Cape | 400,000 | (Brazil) Adilson da Silva (4) | n/a | | |
| 31 Aug | Telkom PGA Pro-Am | Gauteng | 350,000 | (South Africa) Michiel Bothma (2) | n/a | | |
| 8 Sep | Seekers Travel Pro-Am | Gauteng | 400,000 | (South Africa) James Kamte (1) | n/a | | |
| 28 Sep | Vodacom Origins of Golf Final | Eastern Cape | 400,000 | (South Africa) Titch Moore (6) | n/a | | |
| 7 Oct | Bearing Man Highveld Classic | Mpumalanga | 400,000 | (Zimbabwe) Marc Cayeux (8) | n/a | | |
| 20 Oct | MTC Namibia PGA Championship | Namibia | 700,000 | (South Africa) Keith Horne (2) | n/a | | |
| 27 Oct | Platinum Classic | North West | 705,000 | (South Africa) Louis Oosthuizen (4) | n/a | | |
| 22 Nov | Coca-Cola Charity Championship | Western Cape | 500,000 | (South Africa) Titch Moore (7) | n/a | | |
| 28 Nov | Nedbank Affinity Cup | North West | 500,000 | (South Africa) Mark Murless (3) | n/a | | New tournament |
| 2 Dec | Nedbank Golf Challenge | North West | US$4,385,000 | (South Africa) Trevor Immelman (5) | 34 | | Limited-field event |
| 9 Dec | Alfred Dunhill Championship | Mpumalanga | €1,000,000 | (England) John Bickerton (n/a) | 22 | EUR | |
| 16 Dec | South African Airways Open | Western Cape | €1,000,000 | (South Africa) James Kingston (7) | 32 | EUR | Flagship event |

=== Unofficial events ===
The following events were sanctioned by the Sunshine Tour, but did not carry official money, nor were wins official.

| Date | Tournament | Location | Purse (R) | Winner | OWGR points | Other tours | Notes |
|---|---|---|---|---|---|---|---|
| 11 Nov | HSBC Champions | China | US$5,000,000 | (United States) Phil Mickelson | 52 | ANZ, (Note: PGA Tour of Australasia unofficial event) ASA, (Note: Asian Tour unofficial event) EUR | Limited-field event |

== Order of Merit ==
The Order of Merit was based on prize money won during the season, calculated in South African rand.

| Position | Player | Prize money (R) |
|---|---|---|
| 1 | (South Africa) James Kingston | 1,980,689 |
| 2 | (South Africa) Louis Oosthuizen | 1,596,846 |
| 3 | (South Africa) Andrew McLardy | 1,387,475 |
| 4 | (South Africa) Hennie Otto | 1,331,376 |
| 5 | (South Africa) Richard Sterne | 966,547 |

== Awards ==
| Award | Winner | Ref. |
|---|---|---|
| Rookie of the Year (Bobby Locke Trophy) | (England) Ross McGowan | |
