= Vodacom Championship =

Tournament information
- Location: Pretoria, Gauteng, South Africa
- Established: 2001
- Course: Pretoria Country Club
- Par: 72
- Length: 7,063 yards (6,458 m)
- Tour: Sunshine Tour
- Format: Stroke play
- Prize fund: R 2,650,000
- Month played: February
- Final year: 2010

Tournament record score
- Aggregate: 260 Hennie Otto (2010)
- To par: −28 as above

Final champion
- (South Africa) Hennie Otto
- Location in South Africa Location in Gauteng

The Vodacom Championship was an annual golf tournament on the Sunshine Tour. It was inaugurated in 2001 as part of the rebranding of the old Southern Africa Tour, and being the last event on the schedule, it was titled as The Tour Championship, but was renamed when the tour switched to a calendar based season in 2007.

The event took place in February each year, and was last held at the Pretoria Country Club in Pretoria, Gauteng Province, South Africa, with a prize fund in 2010 of 2.65 million rand.

== Winners ==
Sunshine Tour (Tour Championship)	2001–2006
Sunshine Tour (Regular)	2007–2010

#	Year	Winner	Score	To par	Margin of victory	Runner(s)-up
Vodacom Championship
10th	2010	(South Africa) Hennie Otto (2)	260	−28	9 strokes	(South Africa) Jbe' Kruger
9th	2009	(Denmark) Anders Hansen	270	−18	4 strokes	(Canada) Graham DeLaet (South Africa) Charl Schwartzel
8th	2008	(South Africa) James Kingston	271	−17	2 strokes	(Brazil) Adilson da Silva
7th	2007	(South Africa) Richard Sterne	274	−14	Playoff	(South Africa) Louis Oosthuizen
Vodacom Tour Championship
6th	2006	(South Africa) Charl Schwartzel	270	−14	4 strokes	(South Africa) Darren Fichardt
5th	2005	(Zimbabwe) Marc Cayeux	268	−20	6 strokes	(South Africa) Keith Horne
The Tour Championship
4th	2004	(South Africa) Andrew McLardy	273	−15	3 strokes	(South Africa) Louis Oosthuizen
3rd	2003	(South Africa) Hennie Otto	273	−15	2 strokes	(South Africa) Trevor Immelman
2nd	2002	(South Africa) Nicholas Lawrence	274	−14	1 stroke	(South Africa) Tim Clark (United States) Bruce Vaughan
1st	2001	(South Africa) Darren Fichardt	270	−14	4 strokes	(South Africa) Hennie Otto
