= 2006–07 Sunshine Tour =

Golf tour season

2006–07 Sunshine Tour season
- Duration: 16 March 2006 – 25 February 2007
- Number of official events: 27
- Most wins: (South Africa) Jean Hugo (3)
- Order of Merit: (South Africa) Charl Schwartzel
- Rookie of the Year: (South Africa) Rossouw Loubser

The 2006–07 Sunshine Tour was the 36th season of the Sunshine Tour (formerly the Southern Africa Tour), the main professional golf tour in South Africa since it was formed in 1971.

== Schedule ==
The following table lists official events during the 2006–07 season.

Date	Tournament	Location	Purse (R)	Winner (Note: The number in brackets after each winner's name is the number of Sunshine Tour events they had won up to and including that tournament. This information is only shown for Sunshine Tour members.)	OWGR points	Other tours (Note: ANZ − PGA Tour of Australasia; ASA − Asian Tour; EUR − European Tour.)	Notes
19 Mar	Stanbic Zambia Open	Zambia	750,000	(South Africa) Steve Basson (2)	n/a		
21 Apr	Vodacom Origins of Golf at Arabella	Western Cape	360,000	(South Africa) Jean Hugo (3)	n/a		
29 Apr	SAA Pro-Am Invitational (1st)	Western Cape	350,000	(South Africa) Jean Hugo (4)	n/a		New tournament series
6 May	Samsung Royal Swazi Sun Open	Swaziland	550,000	(South Africa) Thomas Aiken (6)	n/a		
13 May	Suncoast Classic	KwaZulu-Natal	350,000	(South Africa) Alex Haindl (1)	n/a		New tournament
20 May	SAA Pro-Am Invitational (2nd)	Gauteng	350,000	(Zimbabwe) Tongoona Charamba (1)	n/a		
26 May	Vodacom Origins of Golf at Pretoria	Gauteng	360,000	(South Africa) Vaughn Groenewald (1)	n/a		
30 Jun	Vodacom Origins of Golf at Selborne	KwaZulu-Natal	360,000	(South Africa) Rossouw Loubser (1)	n/a		
18 Aug	Vodacom Origins of Golf at Bloemfontein	Free State	360,000	(South Africa) Rossouw Loubser (2)	n/a		
25 Aug	Telkom PGA Pro-Am	Gauteng	330,000	(Scotland) Doug McGuigan (2)	n/a		
2 Sep	Eskom Power Cup	North West	350,000	(South Africa) Trevor Fisher Jnr (2)	n/a		New tournament
15 Sep	Vodacom Origins of Golf at Pezula	Western Cape	360,000	(South Africa) Kevin Stone (4)	n/a		
30 Sep	Seekers Travel Pro-Am	Gauteng	350,000	(South Africa) Desvonde Botes (12)	n/a		
6 Oct	Vodacom Origins of Golf Final	Western Cape	360,000	(South Africa) Darren Fichardt (5)	n/a		
15 Oct	Bearing Man Highveld Classic	Mpumalanga	400,000	(South Africa) Darren Fichardt (6)	n/a		
21 Oct	MTC Namibia PGA Championship	Namibia	600,000	(South Africa) Anton Haig (2)	n/a		
28 Oct	Platinum Classic	North West	600,000	(South Africa) Vaughn Groenewald (2)	n/a		
19 Nov	Limpopo Classic	Limpopo	1,000,000	(South Africa) Bradford Vaughan (8)	12		
23 Nov	Coca-Cola Charity Championship	Western Cape	500,000	(South Africa) Alan Michell (1)	n/a		New tournament
3 Dec	Nedbank Golf Challenge	North West	US$4,385,000	(United States) Jim Furyk (n/a)	38		New to Sunshine Tour; Limited-field event
10 Dec	Alfred Dunhill Championship	Mpumalanga	€1,000,000	(Spain) Álvaro Quirós (n/a)	18	EUR	
17 Dec	South African Airways Open	Eastern Cape	€1,000,000	(South Africa) Ernie Els (14)	32	EUR	Flagship event
14 Jan	Joburg Open	Gauteng	€1,000,000	(Argentina) Ariel Cañete (n/a)	20	EUR	New tournament
28 Jan	Dimension Data Pro-Am	North West	1,600,000	(South Africa) Louis Oosthuizen (2)	14		Pro-Am
4 Feb	Nashua Masters	Eastern Cape	1,200,000	(South Africa) Jean Hugo (5)	14		
18 Feb	Vodacom Championship	Gauteng	2,200,000	(South Africa) Richard Sterne (2)	14		
25 Feb	Telkom PGA Championship	Gauteng	2,250,000	(South Africa) Louis Oosthuizen (3)	14		

=== Unofficial events ===
The following events were sanctioned by the Sunshine Tour, but did not carry official money, nor were wins official.

Date	Tournament	Location	Purse (R)	Winner	OWGR points	Other tours	Notes
12 Nov	HSBC Champions	China	US$5,000,000	(South Korea) Yang Yong-eun	52	ANZ, (Note: PGA Tour of Australasia unofficial event) ASA, (Note: Asian Tour unofficial event) EUR	Limited-field event

== Order of Merit ==
The Order of Merit was based on prize money won during the season, calculated in South African rand.

Position	Player	Prize money (R)
1	(South Africa) Charl Schwartzel	1,585,117
2	(South Africa) Louis Oosthuizen	1,314,739
3	(South Africa) Hennie Otto	1,274,340
4	(South Africa) Andrew McLardy	1,239,926
5	(South Africa) Darren Fichardt	1,160,182

== Awards ==
Award	Winner	Ref.
Rookie of the Year (Bobby Locke Trophy)	(South Africa) Rossouw Loubser	
