= 2010 Sunshine Tour =

Golf tour season

2010 Sunshine Tour season
- Duration: 7 January 2010 – 19 December 2010
- Number of official events: 28
- Most wins: (South Africa) Jaco van Zyl (4)
- Order of Merit: (South Africa) Charl Schwartzel
- Players' Player of the Year: (South Africa) Jaco van Zyl
- Rookie of the Year: (South Africa) Anthony Michael

The 2010 Sunshine Tour was the 40th season of the Sunshine Tour (formerly the Southern Africa Tour), the main professional golf tour in South Africa since it was formed in 1971.

== Schedule ==
The following table lists official events during the 2010 season.

| Date | Tournament | Location | Purse (R) | Winner (Note: The number in brackets after each winner's name is the number of Sunshine Tour events they had won up to and including that tournament. This information is only shown for Sunshine Tour members.) | OWGR points | Other tours (Note: EUR − European Tour.) | Notes |
|---|---|---|---|---|---|---|---|
| 10 Jan | Africa Open | Eastern Cape | €1,000,000 | (South Africa) Charl Schwartzel (3) | 20 | EUR | |
| 17 Jan | Joburg Open | Gauteng | €1,300,000 | (South Africa) Charl Schwartzel (4) | 22 | EUR | |
| 14 Feb | Dimension Data Pro-Am | Western Cape | 3,000,000 | (South Africa) Darren Fichardt (10) | 14 | | Pro-Am |
| 21 Feb | Telkom PGA Championship | Gauteng | 3,000,000 | (South Africa) Michiel Bothma (3) | 14 | | |
| 28 Feb | Vodacom Championship | Gauteng | 2,650,000 | (South Africa) Hennie Otto (9) | 14 | | |
| 16 Apr | Vodacom Origins of Golf at Gardener Ross | Gauteng | 510,000 | (South Africa) Jean Hugo (8) | n/a | | |
| 24 Apr | Africom Zimbabwe Open | Zimbabwe | 1,200,000 | (South Africa) Jbe' Kruger (2) | 14 | | |
| 30 Apr | Vodacom Origins of Golf at Sishen | Free State | 510,000 | (South Africa) Jaco van Zyl (6) | n/a | | |
| 8 May | Investec Royal Swazi Open | Swaziland | 750,000 | (South Africa) Keith Horne (4) | n/a | | |
| 15 May | Nashua Golf Challenge | North West | 500,000 | (South Africa) Jaco van Zyl (7) | n/a | | |
| 6 Jun | Lombard Insurance Classic | Swaziland | 700,000 | (South Africa) Grant Muller (2) | n/a | | |
| 30 Jul | Vodacom Origins of Golf at Humewood | Eastern Cape | 510,000 | (South Africa) Ulrich van den Berg (6) | n/a | | |
| 20 Aug | Vodacom Origins of Golf at Selborne | KwaZulu-Natal | 510,000 | (South Africa) James Kingston (9) | n/a | | |
| 29 Aug | Zambia Open | Zambia | 850,000 | (Brazil) Adilson da Silva (6) | n/a | | |
| 3 Sep | Telkom PGA Pro-Am | Gauteng | 500,000 | (South Africa) Jaco van Zyl (8) | n/a | | |
| 11 Sep | SAA Pro-Am Invitational (1st) | Gauteng | 500,000 | (South Africa) Tyrone Ferreira (2) | n/a | | |
| 18 Sep | Vodacom Origins of Golf at Stellenbosch | Western Cape | 510,000 | (South Africa) Jean Hugo (9) | n/a | | |
| 25 Sep | SAA Pro-Am Invitational (2nd) | Western Cape | 500,000 | (South Africa) Jaco van Zyl (9) | n/a | | |
| 2 Oct | SAA Pro-Am Invitational (3rd) | KwaZulu-Natal | 500,000 | (South Africa) Michiel Bothma (4) | n/a | | |
| 15 Oct | Vodacom Origins of Golf Final | Western Cape | 510,000 | (South Africa) Justin Harding (1) | n/a | | |
| 24 Oct | Suncoast Classic | KwaZulu-Natal | 500,000 | (Brazil) Adilson da Silva (7) | n/a | | |
| 30 Oct | Platinum Classic | North West | 705,000 | (South Africa) Jean Hugo (10) | n/a | | |
| 7 Nov | Nashua Masters | Eastern Cape | 1,200,000 | (South Africa) Warren Abery (7) | 14 | | |
| 14 Nov | BMG Classic | Gauteng | 550,000 | (South Africa) Brandon Pieters (4) | n/a | | |
| 18 Nov | Coca-Cola Charity Championship | Western Cape | 550,000 | (South Africa) Branden Grace (1) | n/a | | |
| 5 Dec | Nedbank Golf Challenge | North West | US$5,000,000 | (England) Lee Westwood (n/a) | 34 | | Limited-field event |
| 12 Dec | Alfred Dunhill Championship | Mpumalanga | €1,000,000 | (Spain) Pablo Martín (n/a) | 20 | EUR | |
| 19 Dec | South African Open Championship | KwaZulu-Natal | €1,000,000 | (South Africa) Ernie Els (15) | 32 | EUR | Flagship event |

== Order of Merit ==
The Order of Merit was based on prize money won during the season, calculated in South African rand.

| Position | Player | Prize money (R) |
|---|---|---|
| 1 | (South Africa) Charl Schwartzel | 5,097,914 |
| 2 | (South Africa) Thomas Aiken | 1,959,543 |
| 3 | (South Africa) Keith Horne | 1,904,950 |
| 4 | (South Africa) Jbe' Kruger | 1,768,632 |
| 5 | (South Africa) Louis Oosthuizen | 1,392,835 |

== Awards ==
| Award | Winner | Ref. |
|---|---|---|
| Players' Player of the Year | (South Africa) Jaco van Zyl | |
| Rookie of the Year (Bobby Locke Trophy) | (South Africa) Anthony Michael | |
