= Murhof Legends – Austrian Senior Open =

European men's senior golf tournament

Riegler & Partner Legends
Tournament information
- Location: Frohnleiten, Austria
- Established: 2019
- Course: Golfclub Murhof
- Par: 72
- Length: 6,645 yards (6,076 m)
- Tour: European Senior Tour
- Format: Stroke play
- Prize fund: €250,000
- Month played: May

Tournament record score
- Aggregate: 197 José Cóceres (2019)
- To par: −19 as above

Current champion
- (Brazil) Adilson da Silva

Location map
- Location in Austria

The Murhof Legends – Austrian Senior Open is a men's senior (over 50) professional golf tournament on the European Senior Tour. It was held for the first time in September 2019 at Golfclub Murhof, Frohnleiten, Austria and was the first European Senior Tour event to be held in Austria. Prize money was €250,000.

== Winners ==
Year	Winner	Score	To par	Margin of victory	Runner-up
Riegler & Partner Legends
2023	(Brazil) Adilson da Silva	201	−15	Playoff	(South Africa) Keith Horne
2022	(Scotland) Euan McIntosh	206	−10	1 stroke	(South Africa) James Kingston
2021	(Argentina) Mauricio Molina	199	−17	4 strokes	(Argentina) José Cóceres
Murhof Legends – Austrian Senior Open
2020	Cancelled due to the COVID-19 pandemic				
2019	(Argentina) José Cóceres	197	−19	4 strokes	(Scotland) Paul Lawrie
