= Adilson da Silva =

Brazilian professional golfer (born 1972)

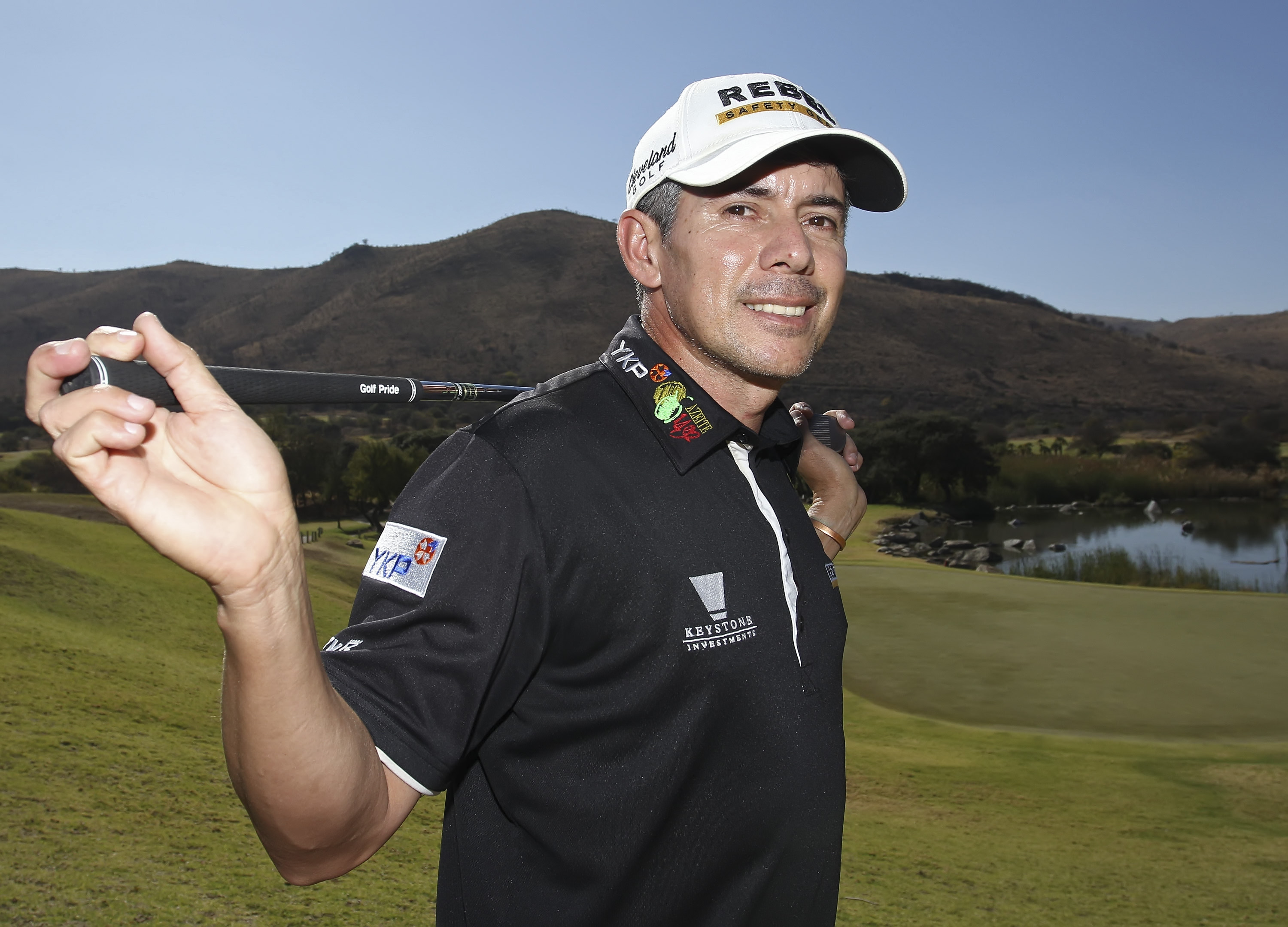

Personal information
- Full name: Adilson José da Silva
- Nationality: Brazil
- Born: 24 January 1972 (age 54) Santa Cruz do Sul, Brazil
- Height: 1.75 m (5 ft 9 in)
- Weight: 75 kg (165 lb; 11.8 st)

Career
- Sport: Golf
- Turned professional: 1994
- Current tours: Sunshine Tour; European Senior Tour
- Former tours: European Tour; Asian Tour
- Professional wins: 20

Number of wins by tour
- Asian Tour: 1
- Sunshine Tour: 12
- European Senior Tour: 7

Best results in major championships
- Masters Tournament: DNP
- PGA Championship: DNP
- U.S. Open: DNP
- The Open Championship: T69: 2012

Achievements and awards
- European Senior Tour Rookie of the Year: 2022
- European Senior Tour Order of Merit Winner: 2024

Adilson José da Silva (born 24 January 1972) is a Brazilian professional golfer. He currently plays on the European Senior Tour and the Sunshine Tour, where he has won twelve times.

== Career ==
Da Silva was born in Santa Cruz do Sul, Brazil but later moved to KwaZulu-Natal, South Africa. He turned professional in 1994. Da Silva competes predominantly on the Southern Africa-based Sunshine Tour. He won his first title on the tour in 1997 and has since added eight more tournament victories, and led the Vodacom Swing Challenge standings in 2006. He holds the record for most consecutive cuts made on the Sunshine Tour with 43.

Da Silva has also played extensively in Zimbabwe, where he won the Amateur Championship in 1992. He competed on the Zimbabwean PGA Tour between 1996 and 2003, winning more than 30 titles and heading the Zimbabwean Order of Merit on five occasions.

Da Silva played in The Open Championship in 2000, 2007 and 2012. He made the cut in 2012, finishing in a tie for 69th.

In 2016, da Silva hit the opening tee shot in golf’s return to the Olympics in Rio de Janeiro.

== Amateur wins ==
- 1990 Brazil Amateur Open Championship
- 1991 Brazil Amateur Open Championship
- 1992 Zimbabwe Amateur Championship
- Phalaborwa Open

== Professional wins (20) ==
=== Asian Tour wins (1) ===
No.	Date	Tournament	Winning score	Margin of victory	Runners-up
1	30 Sep 2018	Mercuries Taiwan Masters^{1}	−7 (71-70-70-70=281)	1 stroke	(United States) Berry Henson, (Taiwan) Lin Wen-tang

^{1}Co-sanctioned by the Taiwan PGA Tour

Asian Tour playoff record (0–1)

No.	Year	Tournament	Opponents	Result
1	2011	ISPS Handa Singapore Classic	(India) Himmat Rai, (Philippines) Elmer Salvador, (Netherlands) Guido van der Valk, (South Africa) Tjaart van der Walt	Rai won with birdie on sixth extra hole da Silva, van der Valk and van der Walt eliminated by birdie on second hole

=== Sunshine Tour wins (12) ===
No.	Date	Tournament	Winning score	Margin of victory	Runner(s)-up
1	16 Nov 1997	Leopard Rock Classic	−6 (67-72-69-66=274)	2 strokes	(South Africa) Mark Murless, (South Africa) Sean Pappas
2	1 Feb 1998	Nashua Wild Coast Sun Challenge	−14 (64-69-66=199)	4 strokes	(England) Chris Davison, (United States) Scott Dunlap, (South Africa) Marco Gortana, (South Africa) Hennie Walters
3	19 May 2007	Suncoast Classic	−8 (71-66-71=208)	1 stroke	(Scotland) Doug McGuigan
4	24 Aug 2007	Vodacom Origins of Golf at Fancourt	−2 (75-72-70=217)	Playoff	(South Africa) Warren Abery
5	2 May 2009	SAA Pro-Am Invitational (1st)	−13 (68-67-68=203)	1 stroke	(South Africa) Darren Fichardt, (South Africa) Anton Haig
6	29 Aug 2010	Zambia Open	−17 (64-66-72=202)	4 strokes	(South Africa) Johan du Buisson
7	24 Oct 2010	Suncoast Classic (2)	−20 (67-63-66=196)	4 strokes	(South Africa) Jean Hugo
8	14 May 2011	Nashua Golf Challenge	−14 (70-69-63=202)	5 strokes	(South Africa) Trevor Fisher Jnr
9	2 Sep 2011	Vodacom Origins of Golf (2) at Sishen	−10 (71-67-68=206)	2 strokes	(South Africa) Allan Versfeld
10	22 Aug 2012	Vodacom Origins of Golf (3) at Selborne Park	−12 (69-66-69=204)	1 stroke	(Scotland) Doug McGuigan, (South Africa) Daniel van Tonder
11	19 May 2013	Zambia Sugar Open (2)	−11 (67-72-69-73=281)	1 stroke	(South Africa) Martin du Toit, (South Africa) Alex Haindl
12	5 Jul 2013	Sun City Challenge (2)	−9 (67-70-70=207)	1 stroke	(South Africa) Jared Harvey

Sunshine Tour playoff record (1–3)

No.	Year	Tournament	Opponent(s)	Result
1	2003	Capital Alliance Royal Swazi Sun Open	(South Africa) Des Terblanche	Lost to par on first extra hole
2	2007	Vodacom Origins of Golf at Fancourt	(South Africa) Warren Abery	Won with birdie on second extra hole
3	2007	Platinum Classic	(Zimbabwe) Marc Cayeux, (South Africa) Louis Oosthuizen	Oosthuizen won with par on second extra hole da Silva eliminated by par on first hole
4	2018	Sun Wild Coast Sun Challenge	(South Africa) Hennie du Plessis, (South Africa) Vaughn Groenewald, (South Africa) Darren Fichardt	Groenewald won with birdie on first extra hole

=== European Senior Tour wins (7) ===
No.	Date	Tournament	Winning score	Margin of victory	Runner-up
1	28 Aug 2022	Staysure PGA Seniors Championship	−18 (64-69-67-70=270)	6 strokes	(Sweden) Joakim Haeggman
2	20 May 2023	Riegler & Partner Legends	−15 (67-68-66=201)	Playoff	(South Africa) Keith Horne
3	9 Jul 2023	Swiss Seniors Open	−15 (66-62-67=195)	2 strokes	(South Africa) James Kingston
4	9 Sep 2023	WCM Legends Open de France	−15 (65-65-68=198)	3 strokes	(Sweden) Michael Jonzon
5	2 Dec 2023	Vinpearl DIC Legends Vietnam	−10 (66-69-68=203)	3 strokes	(Australia) Scott Hend
6	22 Jun 2024	OFX Irish Legends	−7 (70-72-67=209)	Playoff	(Sweden) Patrik Sjöland
7	15 Sep 2024	European Legends Cup	−9 (71-68-68=207)	Playoff	(England) Peter Baker

European Senior Tour playoff record (3–1)

No.	Year	Tournament	Opponent(s)	Result
1	2023	Riegler & Partner Legends	(South Africa) Keith Horne	Won with birdie on first extra hole
2	2024	OFX Irish Legends	(Sweden) Patrik Sjöland	Won with birdie on third extra hole
4	2024	European Legends Cup	(England) Peter Baker	Won with birdie on first extra hole
5	2024	WINSTONgolf Senior Open	(England) Phillip Archer, (England) Van Phillips	Phillips won with birdie on fourth extra hole

== Results in major championships ==
Tournament	2000	2001	2002	2003	2004	2005	2006	2007	2008	2009	2010	2011	2012
The Open Championship	CUT							CUT					T69

Note: da Silva only played in The Open Championship.

Did not play

CUT = missed the half-way cut
"T" = tied

== Team appearances ==
Professional

- World Cup (representing Brazil): 2011, 2013

== See also ==
- List of golfers with most European Senior Tour wins
