= Royal Swazi Sun Classic =

Tournament information
- Location: Ezulwini Valley, Eswatini
- Established: 1998
- Course: Royal Swazi Spa
- Par: 72
- Length: 5,983 yards (5,471 m)
- Tour: Sunshine Tour
- Format: Stroke play
- Prize fund: R 200,000
- Month played: June
- Final year: 2004

Tournament record score
- Aggregate: 198 Nic Henning (2003)
- To par: −18 as above

Final champion
- (South Africa) Bradford Vaughan

Location map
- Location in Eswatini

The Royal Swazi Sun Classic was a golf tournament on the Sunshine Tour in the late 1990s and early 2000s. It was played at the Royal Swazi Sun Country Club in Swaziland. This is not to be confused with the Investec Royal Swazi Open, another Sunshine Tour event in Swaziland also played at the same course.

== Winners ==
Year	Winner	Score	To par	Margin of victory	Runner(s)-up	Ref.
2004	(South Africa) Bradford Vaughan (2)	199	−17	4 strokes	(South Africa) Ashley Roestoff	
2003	(South Africa) Nic Henning	198	−18	2 strokes	(South Africa) Mark Murless	
2002	(South Africa) James Kingston	204	−12	1 stroke	(South Africa) Keith Horne (South Africa) Bobby Lincoln	
2001	(South Africa) Titch Moore	200	−16	Playoff	(South Africa) Keith Horne	
2000: No tournament
1999	(South Africa) Bradford Vaughan	200	−16	3 strokes	(South Africa) Nic Henning	
1998	(South Africa) Justin Hobday	207	−9	3 strokes	(South Africa) Titch Moore	
