= Ulrich van den Berg (golfer) =

South African professional golfer (born 1975)

Personal information
- Full name: Ulrich van den Berg
- Nationality: South Africa
- Born: 13 January 1975 (age 51) East London, South Africa
- Height: 1.84 m (6 ft 0 in)
- Weight: 81 kg (179 lb; 12.8 st)

Career
- Sport: Golf
- Turned professional: 1999
- Current tour: Big Easy Tour
- Former tours: European Tour; Sunshine Tour
- Professional wins: 8

Number of wins by tour
- Sunshine Tour: 7
- Other: 1

Ulrich van den Berg (born 13 January 1975) is a South African professional golfer.

== Early life and amateur career ==
Van den Berg was born in East London. He had a successful amateur career which peaked in 1997 when he won the South African Amateur Strokeplay Championship, the Transvaal Amateur, and the Western Province Strokeplay Championship.

== Professional career ==
In 1999, Van den Berg turned professional. He joined the Sunshine Tour. He has several tournament victories on the tour, all on the less lucrative "Winter Swing".

Van den Berg played on the European Tour in 2008 having won his card at qualifying school at the end of 2007. Having been unable to play in more than 10 tournaments in his rookie season due to family reasons, he was granted a conditional card for 2009 on a medical exemption, but failed to win enough money to retain his playing status.

== Amateur wins ==
- 1997 South African Strokeplay, Transvaal Amateur, Western Province Strokeplay

== Professional wins (8) ==
=== Sunshine Tour wins (7) ===
| No. | Date | Tournament | Winning score | Margin of victory | Runner(s)-up |
|---|---|---|---|---|---|
| 1 | 17 Nov 2000 | Riviera Resort Classic | −10 (67-63=130) (Note: Shortened to 36 holes due to weather.) | 3 strokes | (South Africa) Mike Michell |
| 2 | 27 Oct 2001 | Vodacom Trophy | −18 (68-66-64=198) | 2 strokes | (South Africa) Jaco van Zyl |
| 3 | 13 Nov 2004 | Seekers Travel Pro-Am | −13 (69-67-67=203) | Playoff | (South Africa) Mark Murless, (South Africa) Patrick O'Brien |
| 4 | 9 Apr 2005 | Parmalat Classic | −15 (67-65-69=201) | 1 stroke | (South Africa) Peter Karmis, (South Africa) Lindani Ndwandwe |
| 5 | 3 Aug 2007 | Vodacom Origins of Golf at Bloemfontein | −14 (67-66-69=202) | 3 strokes | (South Africa) Bradford Vaughan |
| 6 | 30 Jul 2010 | Vodacom Origins of Golf (2) at Humewood | −14 (65-65-72=202) | 1 stroke | (South Africa) Daniel Greene |
| 7 | 20 Oct 2013 | BMG Classic | −15 (65-69-67=201) | 5 strokes | (South Africa) Titch Moore, (South Africa) Hennie Otto |

Sunshine Tour playoff record (1–3)

| No. | Year | Tournament | Opponent(s) | Result |
|---|---|---|---|---|
| 1 | 2004 | Seekers Travel Pro-Am | (South Africa) Mark Murless, (South Africa) Patrick O'Brien | Won with birdie on second extra hole |
| 2 | 2009 | Vodacom Origins of Golf at Erinvale | (South Africa) Jaco Ahlers | |
| 3 | 2014 | Telkom Business PGA Championship | (South Africa) Titch Moore | Lost to birdie on fifth extra hole |
| 4 | 2015 | Sun Boardwalk Challenge | (South Africa) Chris Swanepoel | Lost to birdie on first extra hole |

=== Big Easy Tour wins (1) ===
| No. | Date | Tournament | Winning score | Margin of victory | Runner-up |
|---|---|---|---|---|---|
| 1 | 8 May 2025 | Betway Big Easy Tour 1 | −12 (68-66-71=209) | 1 stroke | (South Africa) Jaden Deltel |

== See also ==
- 2007 European Tour Qualifying School graduates
- 2015 European Tour Qualifying School graduates
