= Mark Foster (golfer) =

English professional golfer

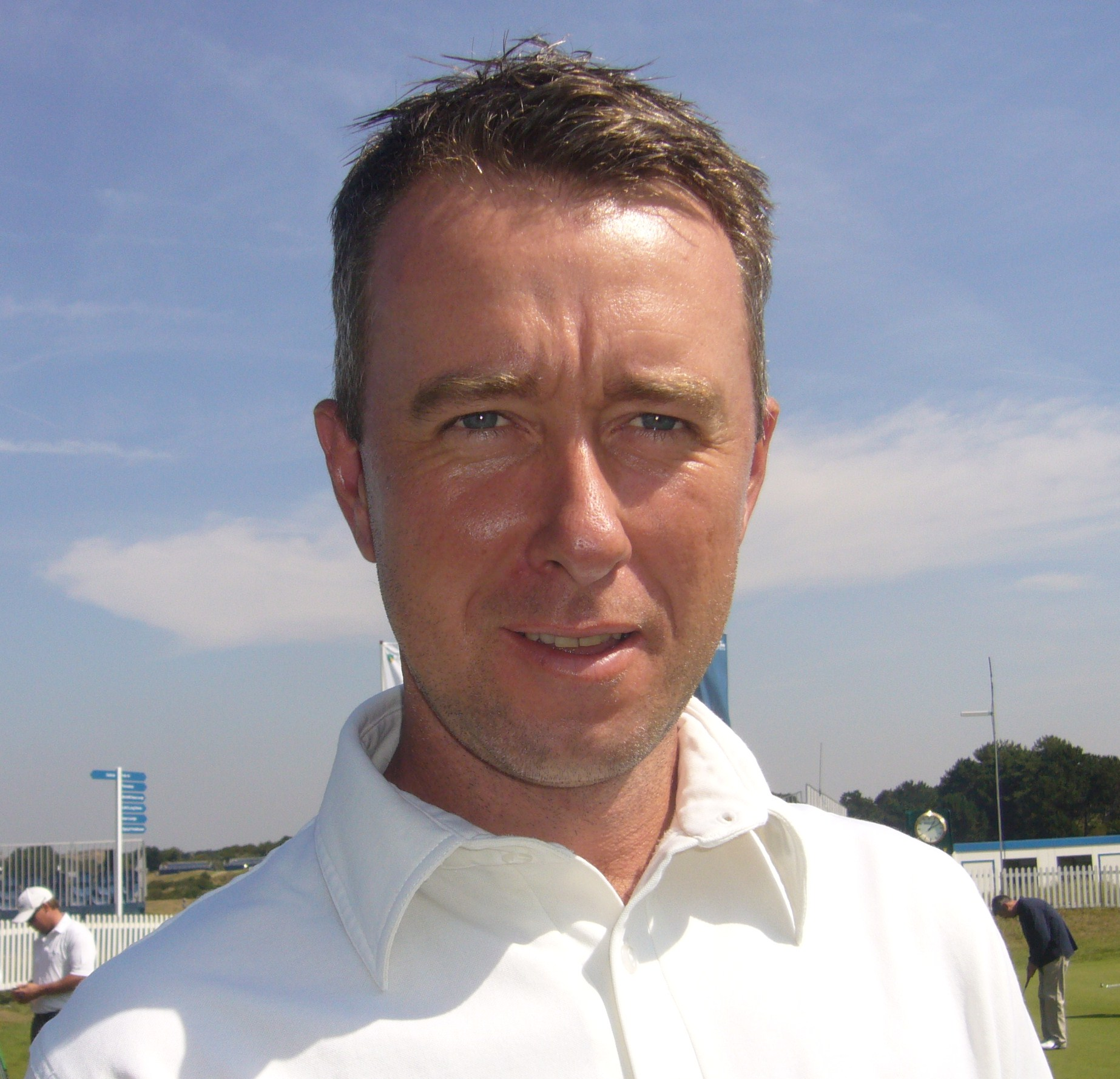
- Foster at the 2009 KLM Open

Personal information
- Full name: Mark Barry Foster
- Nationality: England
- Born: 1 August 1975 (age 51) Worksop, Nottinghamshire, England
- Height: 6 ft 2 in (1.88 m)
- Spouse: Sophie

Career
- Sport: Golf
- Turned professional: 1995
- Former tours: European Tour; Sunshine Tour; Challenge Tour
- Professional wins: 3

Number of wins by tour
- European Tour: 1
- Sunshine Tour: 2
- Challenge Tour: 2

Best results in major championships
- Masters Tournament: DNP
- PGA Championship: DNP
- U.S. Open: DNP
- The Open Championship: T28: 2003

Achievements and awards
- Challenge Tour Rankings winner: 2001

Mark Barry Foster (born 1 August 1975) is an English professional golfer.

== Career ==
Foster was born in Worksop. He won the English Amateur twice before turning professional in 1995. For the first few years as a professional he was troubled by back problems, but in 2001 he won twice on the Challenge Tour and topped the money list. He won for the first time on the European Tour at the 2003 Dunhill Championship in South Africa. In 2011 he had his career best finish on the Order of Merit in 32nd position.

== Amateur wins ==
- 1992 Carris Trophy
- 1994 English Amateur
- 1995 English Amateur, Brabazon Trophy (tie with Colin Edwards)

== Professional wins (3) ==
=== European Tour wins (1) ===
No.	Date	Tournament	Winning score	Margin of victory	Runners-up
1	19 Jan 2003	Dunhill Championship^{1}	−15 (70-66-69-68=273)	Playoff	(Denmark) Anders Hansen, (South Africa) Trevor Immelman, (Scotland) Paul Lawrie, (Scotland) Doug McGuigan, (South Africa) Bradford Vaughan

^{1}Co-sanctioned by the Sunshine Tour

European Tour playoff record (1–1)

No.	Year	Tournament	Opponents	Result
1	2003	Dunhill Championship	(Denmark) Anders Hansen, (South Africa) Trevor Immelman, (Scotland) Paul Lawrie, (Scotland) Doug McGuigan, (South Africa) Bradford Vaughan	Won with eagle on second extra hole Hansen and McGuigan eliminated by birdie on first hole
2	2011	Johnnie Walker Championship at Gleneagles	(Denmark) Thomas Bjørn, (South Africa) George Coetzee, (Spain) Pablo Larrazábal, (Austria) Bernd Wiesberger	Bjørn won with birdie on fifth extra hole Foster eliminated by par on fourth hole Larrazábal eliminated by par on second hole Wiesberger eliminated by par on first hole

=== Sunshine Tour wins (2) ===
No.	Date	Tournament	Winning score	Margin of victory	Runners-up
1	11 Mar 2001	Stanbic Zambia Open^{1}	−14 (70-70-70-68=278)	1 stroke	(England) Stuart Little, (South Africa) Jaco Olver
2	19 Jan 2003	Dunhill Championship^{2}	−15 (70-66-69-68=273)	Playoff	(Denmark) Anders Hansen, (South Africa) Trevor Immelman, (Scotland) Paul Lawrie, (Scotland) Doug McGuigan, (South Africa) Bradford Vaughan

^{1}Co-sanctioned by the Challenge Tour
^{2}Co-sanctioned by the European Tour

Sunshine Tour playoff record (1–0)

No.	Year	Tournament	Opponents	Result
1	2003	Dunhill Championship	(Denmark) Anders Hansen, (South Africa) Trevor Immelman, (Scotland) Paul Lawrie, (Scotland) Doug McGuigan, (South Africa) Bradford Vaughan	Won with eagle on second extra hole Hansen and McGuigan eliminated by birdie on first hole

=== Challenge Tour wins (2) ===
No.	Date	Tournament	Winning score	Margin of victory	Runners-up
1	11 Mar 2001	Stanbic Zambia Open^{1}	−14 (70-70-70-68=278)	1 stroke	(England) Stuart Little, (South Africa) Jaco Olver
2	29 Jul 2001	Charles Church European Challenge Tour Championship	−11 (67-70-71-69=277)	2 strokes	(France) Sébastien Delagrange, (England) Philip Golding

^{1}Co-sanctioned by the Sunshine Tour

== Results in major championships ==
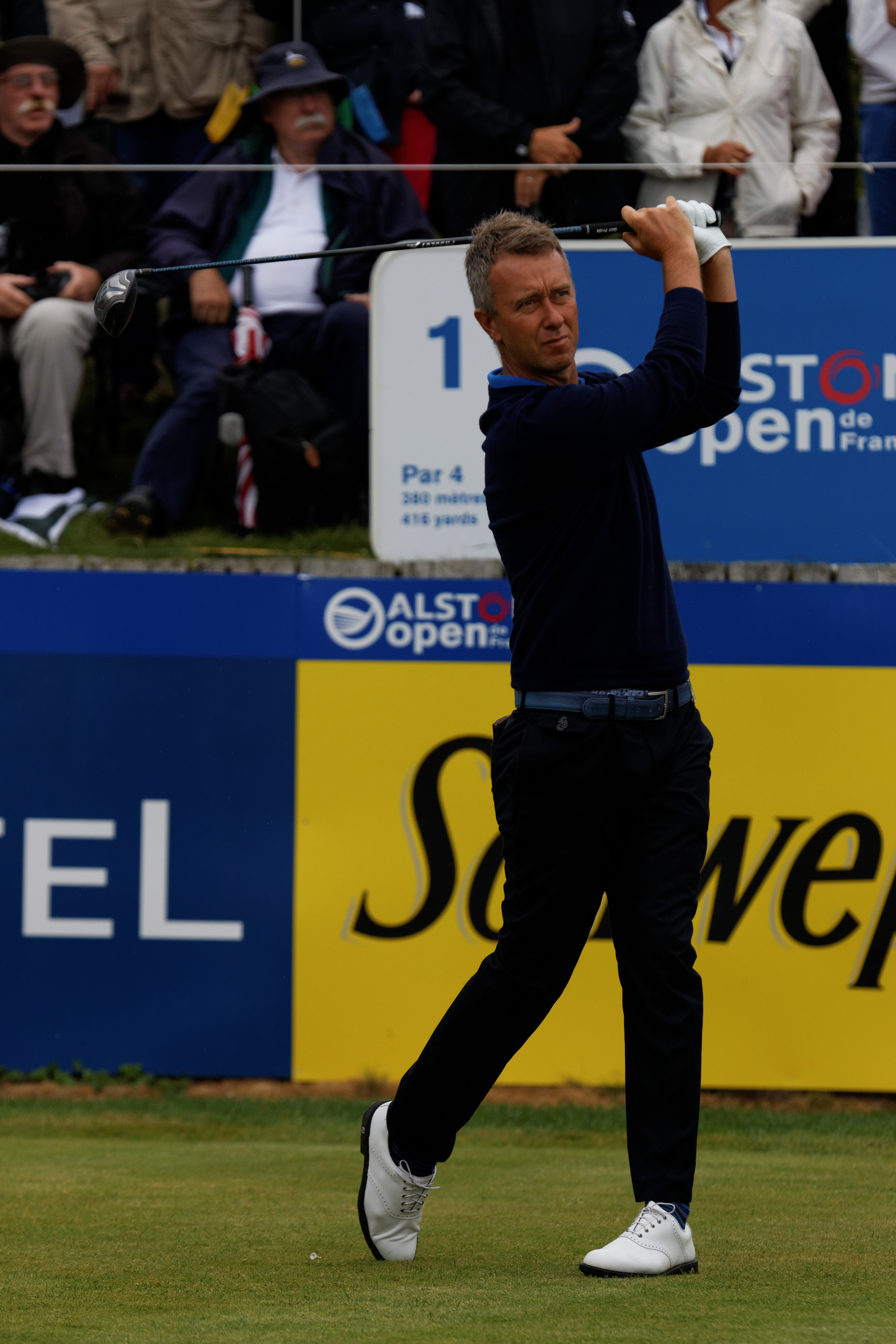
Mark Foster

Tournament	2003	2004	2005	2006	2007	2008	2009
Masters Tournament							
U.S. Open							
The Open Championship	T28	T63			T35		
PGA Championship							

Tournament	2010	2011	2012	2013	2014	2015	2016	2017
Masters Tournament								
U.S. Open								
The Open Championship								CUT
PGA Championship								

Did not play

CUT = missed the half-way cut
"T" = tied

== Results in World Golf Championships ==
Tournament	2003
Championship	T68
Match Play	
Invitational	

Did not play

"T" indicates a tie for a place.

== Team appearances ==
Amateur

- European Youths' Team Championship (representing England): 1994
- St Andrews Trophy (representing Great Britain & Ireland): 1994 (winners)
- Walker Cup (representing Great Britain & Ireland): 1995 (winners)
- European Amateur Team Championship (representing England): 1995

Professional

- Seve Trophy (representing Great Britain & Ireland): 2011 (winners)

== See also ==
- 2016 European Tour Qualifying School graduates
- 2017 European Tour Qualifying School graduates
