= Thomas Aiken =

South African professional golfer

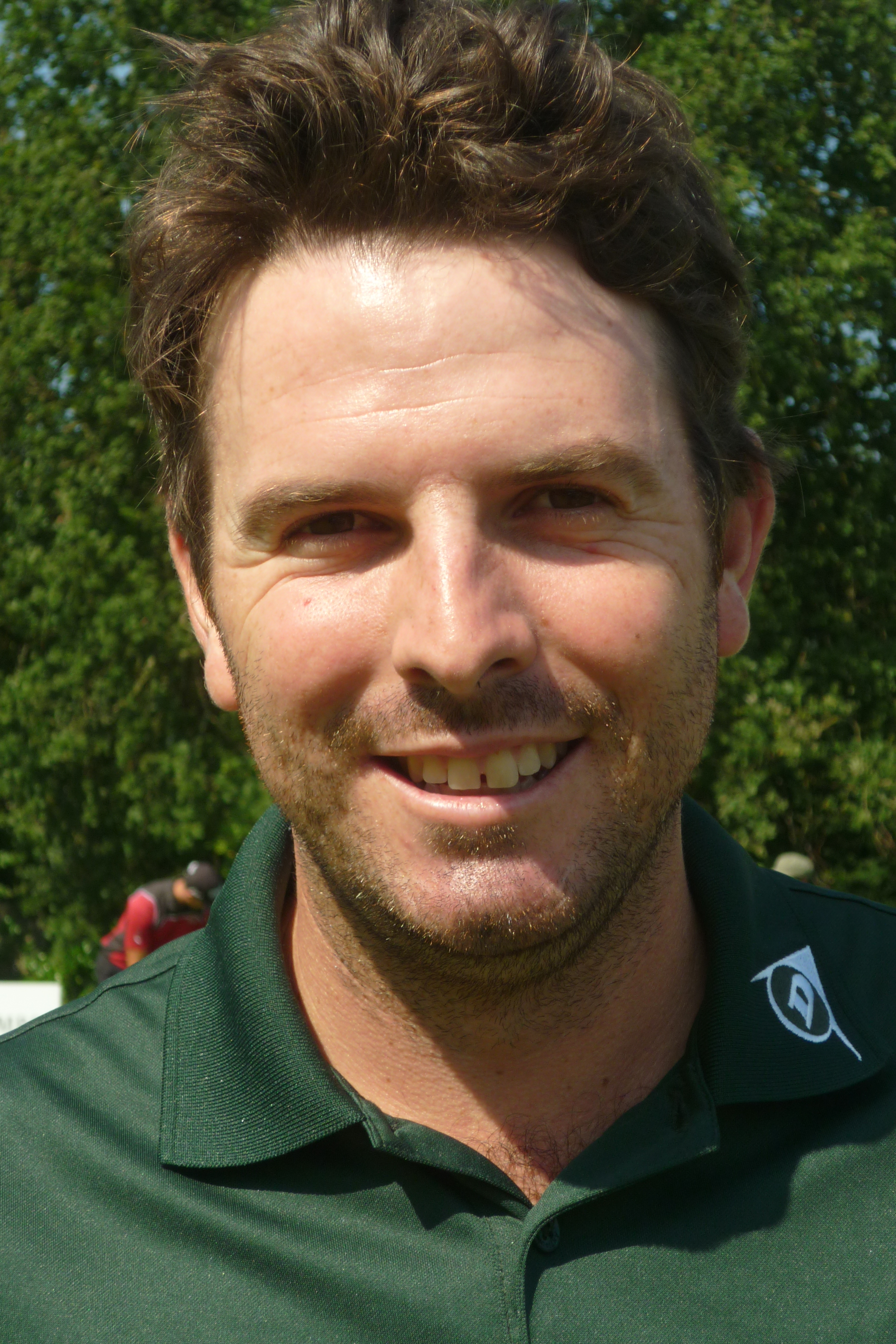

Personal information
- Full name: Thomas Edward Aiken
- Nationality: South Africa
- Born: 16 July 1983 (age 43) Johannesburg, South Africa
- Height: 5 ft 10 in (1.78 m)
- Weight: 150 lb (68 kg; 11 st)

Career
- Sport: Golf
- Turned professional: 2002
- Current tours: European Tour; Sunshine Tour; Web.com Tour
- Former tour: PGA Tour
- Professional wins: 11
- Highest ranking: 73 (8 May 2011)

Number of wins by tour
- European Tour: 3
- Asian Tour: 1
- Sunshine Tour: 8
- Other: 1

Best results in major championships
- Masters Tournament: DNP
- PGA Championship: CUT: 2011, 2012
- U.S. Open: T25: 2015
- The Open Championship: T7: 2012

Achievements and awards
- Sunshine Tour Order of Merit winner: 2014

Thomas Edward Aiken (born 16 July 1983) is a South African professional golfer who plays on the European Tour and Sunshine Tour.

== Amateur career ==
Aiken had a successful amateur career. He was earned the South African Amateur of the Year award in 2001.

== Professional career ==
In 2002, Aiken turned professional. In 2004, he won three times on the Sunshine Tour's Winter Swing. The following year, he topped the money list on the Winter Swing with two further victories.

In 2007, Aiken competed on the Nationwide Tour, but made only three cuts, with a best finish of tied 13th in the Price Cutter Charity Championship. He gained his European Tour card for 2008 through the qualifying school, and went on to finish 131st in the money list, with a best of tied 13th in the Alfred Dunhill Links Championship, his only finish inside the top-30.

The 2009 season saw Aiken register his maiden top-10 finish on the European Tour, with a tied 4th in the Alfred Dunhill Championship, having led going into the final day after a course record 61 in the third round. That, along with several other top-10 finishes, including a win in the Platinum Classic, meant Aiken ended the 2008 Sunshine Tour in third place on the Order of Merit.

A number of top-10 finishes on the European Tour in 2009, including one each in the majors and the World Golf Championships, helped Aiken reach the Dubai World Championship despite holding only partial status on the tour. He finished the season ranked 46th on the Race to Dubai.

In May 2011, Aiken won his first title on the European Tour at the Open de España, winning by two strokes from Anders Hansen. After winning Aiken dedicated the win to home hero Seve Ballesteros who had died the previous day. "I definitely want to dedicate this win to him with it being his home Open and what he gave to his home fans and to golf," said Aiken.

Aiken picked up his second European Tour win at the 2013 Avantha Masters, a tournament co-sanctioned by the Asian Tour.

In 2014, Aiken won the Sunshine Tour's Order of Merit, overtaking Daniel van Tonder in the final tournament.

Aiken has participated several times in the Gary Player Invitational charity tournament.

== Professional wins (11) ==
=== European Tour wins (3) ===
No.	Date	Tournament	Winning score	Margin of victory	Runner-up
1	8 May 2011	Open de España	−10 (68-68-72-70=278)	2 strokes	(Denmark) Anders Hansen
2	17 Mar 2013	Avantha Masters^{1}	−23 (67-69-62-67=265)	3 strokes	(India) Gaganjeet Bhullar
3	16 Feb 2014	Africa Open^{2}	−20 (66-65-66-67=264)	Playoff	(England) Oliver Fisher

^{1}Co-sanctioned by the Asian Tour
^{2}Co-sanctioned by the Sunshine Tour

European Tour playoff record (1–1)

No.	Year	Tournament	Opponent	Result
1	2014	Africa Open	(England) Oliver Fisher	Won with birdie on first extra hole
2	2018	Nordea Masters	(England) Paul Waring	Lost to par on first extra hole

=== Sunshine Tour wins (8) ===
No.	Date	Tournament	Winning score	Margin of victory	Runner(s)-up
1	2 Jul 2004	Vodacom Origins of Golf at Zimbali	−12 (66-72-66=204)	Playoff	(South Africa) Keith Horne
2	23 Jul 2004	Vodacom Origins of Golf (2) at Sun City	−12 (67-66-71=204)	3 strokes	(South Africa) Des Terblanche
3	21 Oct 2004	Vodacom Origins of Golf Final (3)	−5 (68-73-73=214)	7 strokes	(South Africa) Jean Hugo
4	2 Sep 2005	Telkom PGA Pro-Am	−15 (68-66-67=201)	6 strokes	(South Africa) Henk Alberts
5	15 Oct 2005	MTC Namibia PGA Championship	−15 (64-67-67=198)	4 strokes	(South Africa) Michiel Bothma, (Zimbabwe) Sean Farrell, (South Africa) Werner Geyer, (South Africa) Keith Horne
6	6 May 2006	Samsung Royal Swazi Sun Open	59 pts (8-24-9-18=59)	9 points	(South Africa) Steve Basson
7	1 Nov 2008	Platinum Classic	−19 (65-68-64=197)	5 strokes	(South Africa) Desvonde Botes, (South Africa) Nic Henning, (South Africa) Keith Horne
8	16 Feb 2014	Africa Open^{1}	−20 (66-65-66-67=264)	Playoff	(England) Oliver Fisher

^{1}Co-sanctioned by the European Tour

Sunshine Tour playoff record (2–0)

No.	Year	Tournament	Opponent	Result
1	2004	Vodacom Origins of Golf at Zimbali	(South Africa) Keith Horne	Won with par on first extra hole
2	2014	Africa Open	(England) Oliver Fisher	Won with birdie on first extra hole

=== PGA EuroPro Tour wins (1) ===
No.	Date	Tournament	Winning score	Margin of victory	Runner-up
1	3 Jul 2003	Stoke by Nayland Club Championship	−14 (68-67-67=202)	Playoff	(England) Ian Keenan

== Results in major championships ==
Results not in chronological order in 2020.

Tournament	2006	2007	2008	2009
Masters Tournament				
U.S. Open				
The Open Championship	CUT		T39	T8
PGA Championship				

Tournament	2010	2011	2012	2013	2014	2015	2016	2017	2018
Masters Tournament									
U.S. Open						T25	CUT	T58	
The Open Championship	T74	CUT	T7	CUT		80			
PGA Championship		CUT	CUT						

Tournament	2019	2020	2021
Masters Tournament			
PGA Championship			
U.S. Open			CUT
The Open Championship		NT	

Top 10
Did not play

CUT = missed the half-way cut
"T" = tied for place
NT = No tournament due to COVID-19 pandemic

=== Summary ===
Tournament	Wins	2nd	3rd	Top-5	Top-10	Top-25	Events	Cuts made
Masters Tournament	0	0	0	0	0	0	0	0
U.S. Open	0	0	0	0	0	1	4	2
The Open Championship	0	0	0	0	2	2	8	5
PGA Championship	0	0	0	0	0	0	2	0
Totals	0	0	0	0	2	3	14	7

- Most consecutive cuts made – 3 (2008 Open Championship – 2010 Open Championship)
- Longest streak of top-10s – 1 (twice)

== Results in World Golf Championships ==
Results not in chronological order before 2015.

Tournament	2009	2010	2011	2012	2013	2014	2015
Championship	T7		T35				T23
Match Play							
Invitational							
Champions	T68		70	T28			T54

Top 10
Did not play

QF, R16, R32, R64 = Round in which player lost in match play
"T" = Tied

== See also ==
- 2007 European Tour Qualifying School graduates
- 2015 Web.com Tour Finals graduates
