= 2001–02 Sunshine Tour =

Golf tour season

2001–02 Sunshine Tour season
- Duration: 8 March 2001 – 17 February 2002
- Number of official events: 22
- Most wins: (South Africa) James Kingston (2)
- Order of Merit: (South Africa) Tim Clark
- Rookie of the Year: (South Africa) Nicholas Lawrence

The 2001–02 Sunshine Tour was the 31st season of the Sunshine Tour (formerly the Southern Africa Tour), the main professional golf tour in South Africa since it was formed in 1971.

== Schedule ==
The following table lists official events during the 2001–02 season.

Date	Tournament	Location	Purse (R)	Winner (Note: The number in brackets after each winner's name is the number of Sunshine Tour events they had won up to and including that tournament. This information is only shown for Sunshine Tour members.)	OWGR points	Other tours (Note: CHA − Challenge Tour; EUR − European Tour.)	Notes
11 Mar	Stanbic Zambia Open	Zambia	£50,000	(England) Mark Foster (1)	6	CHA	
18 Mar	Cock of The North	Zambia	200,000	(Zimbabwe) Sean Farrell (1)	n/a		
31 Mar	FNB Botswana Open	Botswana	150,000	(Zimbabwe) Marc Cayeux (4)	n/a		
22 Apr	Royal Swazi Sun Classic	Swaziland	200,000	(South Africa) Titch Moore (2)	n/a		
12 May	Pietersburg Industrelek Classic	Limpopo	200,000	(South Africa) Ryan Reid (2)	n/a		
9 Sep	Goldfields Powerade Classic	Free State	200,000	(South Africa) Callie Swart (2)	n/a		New tournament
13 Sep	Bloemfontein Classic	Free State	200,000	(South Africa) André Cruse (1)	n/a		
28 Sep	Randfontein Classic	Gauteng	200,000	(South Africa) James Kingston (4)	n/a		New tournament
7 Oct	Bearing Man Highveld Classic	Mpumalanga	200,000	(South Africa) Justin Hobday (11)	n/a		
12 Oct	Atlantic Beach Classic	Western Cape	200,000	(South Africa) James Kingston (5)	n/a		New tournament
20 Oct	Western Cape Classic	Western Cape	200,000	(South Africa) Lindani Ndwandwe (1)	n/a		
27 Oct	Vodacom Trophy	Gauteng	200,000	(South Africa) Ulrich van den Berg (2)	n/a		New tournament
10 Nov	Graceland Challenge	Mpumalanga	200,000	(South Africa) Warren Abery (2)	n/a		New tournament
18 Nov	Platinum Classic	North West	440,000	(South Africa) Roger Wessels (5)	n/a		
25 Nov	CABS/Old Mutual Zimbabwe Open	Zimbabwe	1,000,000	(South Africa) Darren Fichardt (3)	12		
9 Dec	Vodacom Players Championship	Western Cape	2,000,000	(South Africa) Ernie Els (12)	20		
13 Jan	Bell's South African Open	KwaZulu-Natal	£500,000	(South Africa) Tim Clark (1)	32	EUR	Flagship event
20 Jan	Dunhill Championship	Gauteng	£500,000	(England) Justin Rose (1)	22	EUR	
27 Jan	Telkom PGA Championship	Gauteng	1,000,000	(South Africa) Chris Williams (6)	12		
3 Feb	Dimension Data Pro-Am	North West	2,000,000	(South Africa) Retief Goosen (4)	26		Pro-Am
10 Feb	Nashua Masters	Eastern Cape	1,000,000	(England) Justin Rose (2)	12		
17 Feb	The Tour Championship	Mpumalanga	2,000,000	(South Africa) Nicholas Lawrence (1)	12		Tour Championship

== Order of Merit ==
The Order of Merit was based on prize money won during the season, calculated in South African rand.

Position	Player	Prize money (R)
1	(South Africa) Tim Clark	1,669,901
2	(England) Justin Rose	1,476,006
3	(South Africa) Retief Goosen	1,364,977
4	(South Africa) Martin Maritz	1,042,806
5	(South Africa) James Kingston	706,234

== Awards ==
Award	Winner	Ref.
Rookie of the Year (Bobby Locke Trophy)	(South Africa) Nicholas Lawrence	
