= Bradford Vaughan =

South African professional golfer (born 1975)

Personal information
- Nationality: South Africa
- Born: 14 June 1975 (age 51) Johannesburg, South Africa
- Height: 1.90 m (6 ft 3 in)
- Weight: 98 kg (216 lb; 15.4 st)

Career
- Sport: Golf
- Turned professional: 1995
- Current tour: Sunshine Tour
- Former tour: European Tour
- Professional wins: 8

Number of wins by tour
- Sunshine Tour: 8

Best results in major championships
- Masters Tournament: DNP
- PGA Championship: DNP
- U.S. Open: DNP
- The Open Championship: CUT: 2001

Bradford Vaughan (born 14 June 1975) is a South African professional golfer.

== Amateur career ==
In 1994, Vaughan won the South African Amateur.

== Professional career ==
In 1995, he turned professional. He has won eight tournaments on the Sunshine Tour. He has also been a member of the Challenge Tour in Europe and has played in various European Tour events.

== Professional wins (8) ==
=== Sunshine Tour wins (8) ===
No.	Date	Tournament	Winning score	Margin of victory	Runner(s)-up
1	26 Jul 1997	Trustbank Gauteng Classic	−7 (73-66-70=209)	1 stroke	(South Africa) Des Terblanche
2	30 Sep 1999	Royal Swazi Sun Classic	−16 (68-65-67=200)	3 strokes	(South Africa) Nic Henning
3	18 Feb 2001	Investec Royal Swazi Sun Open	−25 (67-67-65-64=263)	8 strokes	(England) Mark Hilton, (South Africa) Trevor Immelman
4	20 Jun 2004	Royal Swazi Sun Classic (2)	−17 (68-67-64=199)	4 strokes	(South Africa) Ashley Roestoff
5	16 Oct 2004	Limpopo Eskom Classic	−18 (68-63-67=198)	1 stroke	(South Africa) Omar Sandys, (South Africa) Kevin Stone
6	9 Oct 2005	Bearing Man Highveld Classic	−15 (69-66-66=201)	2 strokes	(South Africa) Thomas Aiken, (South Africa) Peter Karmis
7	20 Nov 2005	Limpopo Classic (2)	−19 (65-67-64-69=265)	3 strokes	(South Africa) Titch Moore
8	19 Nov 2006	Limpopo Classic (3)	−18 (68-65-66-67=266)	Playoff	(South Africa) Warren Abery

Sunshine Tour playoff record (1–2)

No.	Year	Tournament	Opponent(s)	Result
1	2003	Dunhill Championship	(England) Mark Foster, (Denmark) Anders Hansen, (South Africa) Trevor Immelman, (Scotland) Paul Lawrie, (Scotland) Doug McGuigan	Foster won with eagle on second extra hole Hansen and McGuigan eliminated by birdie on first hole
2	2006	Suncoast Classic	(South Africa) Alex Haindl, (South Africa) Lindani Ndwandwe	Haindl won with eagle on second extra hole
3	2006	Limpopo Classic	(South Africa) Warren Abery	

== Playoff record ==
European Tour playoff record (0–1)

No.	Year	Tournament	Opponents	Result
1	2003	Dunhill Championship	(England) Mark Foster, (Denmark) Anders Hansen, (South Africa) Trevor Immelman, (Scotland) Paul Lawrie, (Scotland) Doug McGuigan	Foster won with eagle on second extra hole Hansen and McGuigan eliminated by birdie on first hole

== Results in major championships ==
Tournament	2001
The Open Championship	CUT

Note: Vaughan only played in The Open Championship.
CUT = missed the half-way cut

== Team appearances ==
Amateur

- Eisenhower Trophy (representing South Africa): 1994
