= 2003–04 Sunshine Tour =

Golf tour season

2003–04 Sunshine Tour season
- Duration: 6 March 2003 – 22 February 2004
- Number of official events: 17
- Most wins: (South Africa) Andrew McLardy (2)
- Order of Merit: (South Africa) Darren Fichardt
- Rookie of the Year: (Sweden) Johan Edfors

The 2003–04 Sunshine Tour was the 33rd season of the Sunshine Tour (formerly the Southern Africa Tour), the main professional golf tour in South Africa since it was formed in 1971.

== Schedule ==
The following table lists official events during the 2003–04 season.

Date	Tournament	Location	Purse (R)	Winner (Note: The number in brackets after each winner's name is the number of Sunshine Tour events they had won up to and including that tournament. This information is only shown for Sunshine Tour members.)	OWGR points	Other tours (Note: CHA − Challenge Tour; EUR − European Tour.)	Notes
9 Mar	Stanbic Zambia Open	Zambia	€100,000	(Sweden) Johan Edfors (1)	10	CHA	
29 Mar	FNB Botswana Open	Botswana	250,000	(South Africa) Trevor Fisher Jnr (1)	n/a		
10 May	Limpopo Industrelek Classic	Limpopo	300,000	(Zimbabwe) Marc Cayeux (6)	n/a		
18 May	Capital Alliance Royal Swazi Sun Open	Swaziland	250,000	(South Africa) Des Terblanche (6)	n/a		
30 May	Devonvale Championship	Western Cape	200,000	(South Africa) Hendrik Buhrmann (3)	n/a		New tournament
7 Jun	Canon Classic	Western Cape	200,000	(South Africa) Tyrol Auret (1)	n/a		New tournament
22 Jun	Royal Swazi Sun Classic	Swaziland	200,000	(South Africa) Nic Henning (2)	n/a		
27 Jun	Parmalat Classic	Eastern Cape	200,000	(South Africa) Desvonde Botes (9)	n/a		New tournament
4 Oct	Seekers Travel Pro-Am	Gauteng	200,000	(South Africa) Chris Williams (7)	n/a		New tournament
12 Oct	Bearing Man Highveld Classic	Mpumalanga	200,000	(South Africa) Dion Fourie (1)	n/a		
1 Nov	Platinum Classic	North West	500,000	(Scotland) Doug McGuigan (1)	n/a		
18 Jan	South African Airways Open	Western Cape	£500,000	(South Africa) Trevor Immelman (4)	32	EUR	Flagship event
25 Jan	Dunhill Championship	Gauteng	£500,000	(Germany) Marcel Siem (n/a)	18	EUR	
1 Feb	Dimension Data Pro-Am	North West	2,000,000	(South Africa) Darren Fichardt (4)	12		Pro-Am
8 Feb	Nashua Masters	Eastern Cape	1,000,000	(South Africa) Andrew McLardy (4)	12		
15 Feb	Telkom PGA Championship	Gauteng	1,500,000	(South Africa) Warrick Druian (2)	12		
22 Feb	The Tour Championship	Mpumalanga	2,000,000	(South Africa) Andrew McLardy (5)	12		Tour Championship

== Order of Merit ==
The Order of Merit was based on prize money won during the season, calculated in South African rand.

Position	Player	Prize money (R)
1	(South Africa) Darren Fichardt	726,545
2	(South Africa) Andrew McLardy	617,278
3	(South Africa) Desvonde Botes	457,265
4	(South Africa) Louis Oosthuizen	381,729
5	(South Africa) Titch Moore	368,710

== Awards ==
Award	Winner	Ref.
Rookie of the Year (Bobby Locke Trophy)	(Sweden) Johan Edfors	
