= 2002–03 Sunshine Tour =

Golf tour season

2002–03 Sunshine Tour season
- Duration: 21 February 2002 – 2 February 2003
- Number of official events: 15
- Most wins: (South Africa) Hennie Otto (3)
- Order of Merit: (South Africa) Trevor Immelman
- Rookie of the Year: (South Africa) Charl Schwartzel

The 2002–03 Sunshine Tour was the 32nd season of the Sunshine Tour (formerly the Southern Africa Tour), the main professional golf tour in South Africa since it was formed in 1971.

== Schedule ==
The following table lists official events during the 2002–03 season.

Date	Tournament	Location	Purse (R)	Winner (Note: The number in brackets after each winner's name is the number of Sunshine Tour events they had won up to and including that tournament. This information is only shown for Sunshine Tour members.)	OWGR points	Other tours (Note: CHA − Challenge Tour; EUR − European Tour.)	Notes
24 Feb	Capital Alliance Royal Swazi Sun Open	Swaziland	500,000	(South Africa) Andrew McLardy (3)	12		
10 Mar	Stanbic Zambia Open	Zambia	€95,000	(Zimbabwe) Marc Cayeux (5)	10	CHA	
23 Mar	FNB Botswana Open	Botswana	275,000	(South Africa) Hendrik Buhrmann (2)	n/a		
11 May	Limpopo Industrelek Classic	Limpopo	225,000	(South Africa) Hennie Otto (3)	n/a		
19 May	Royal Swazi Sun Classic	Swaziland	200,000	(South Africa) James Kingston (6)	n/a		
28 Sep	Vodacom Golf Classic	Gauteng	200,000	(South Africa) Ashley Roestoff (10)	n/a		
6 Oct	Bearing Man Highveld Classic	Mpumalanga	200,000	(South Africa) Titch Moore (3)	n/a		
3 Nov	Platinum Classic	North West	500,000	(South Africa) Titch Moore (4)	n/a		
17 Nov	Telkom PGA Championship	Gauteng	1,250,000	(South Africa) Michiel Bothma (1)	12		
24 Nov	Nashua Masters	Eastern Cape	1,000,000	(South Africa) Hennie Otto (4)	12		
8 Dec	Vodacom Players Championship	Western Cape	2,000,000	(Zimbabwe) Mark McNulty (33)	12		
12 Jan	South African Airways Open	Western Cape	£500,000	(South Africa) Trevor Immelman (2)	32	EUR	Flagship event
19 Jan	Dunhill Championship	Gauteng	£500,000	(England) Mark Foster (2)	18	EUR	
26 Jan	Dimension Data Pro-Am	North West	2,000,000	(South Africa) Trevor Immelman (3)	16		Pro-Am
2 Feb	The Tour Championship	Mpumalanga	2,000,000	(South Africa) Hennie Otto (5)	12		Tour Championship

== Order of Merit ==
The Order of Merit was based on prize money won during the season, calculated in South African rand.

Position	Player	Prize money (R)
1	(South Africa) Trevor Immelman	2,044,279
2	(England) Mark Foster	1,110,935
3	(South Africa) Hennie Otto	877,118
4	(South Africa) Bradford Vaughan	854,746
5	(Zimbabwe) Mark McNulty	580,960

== Awards ==
Award	Winner	Ref.
Rookie of the Year (Bobby Locke Trophy)	(South Africa) Charl Schwartzel	
