= Andrew McLardy =

South African professional golfer (born 1974)

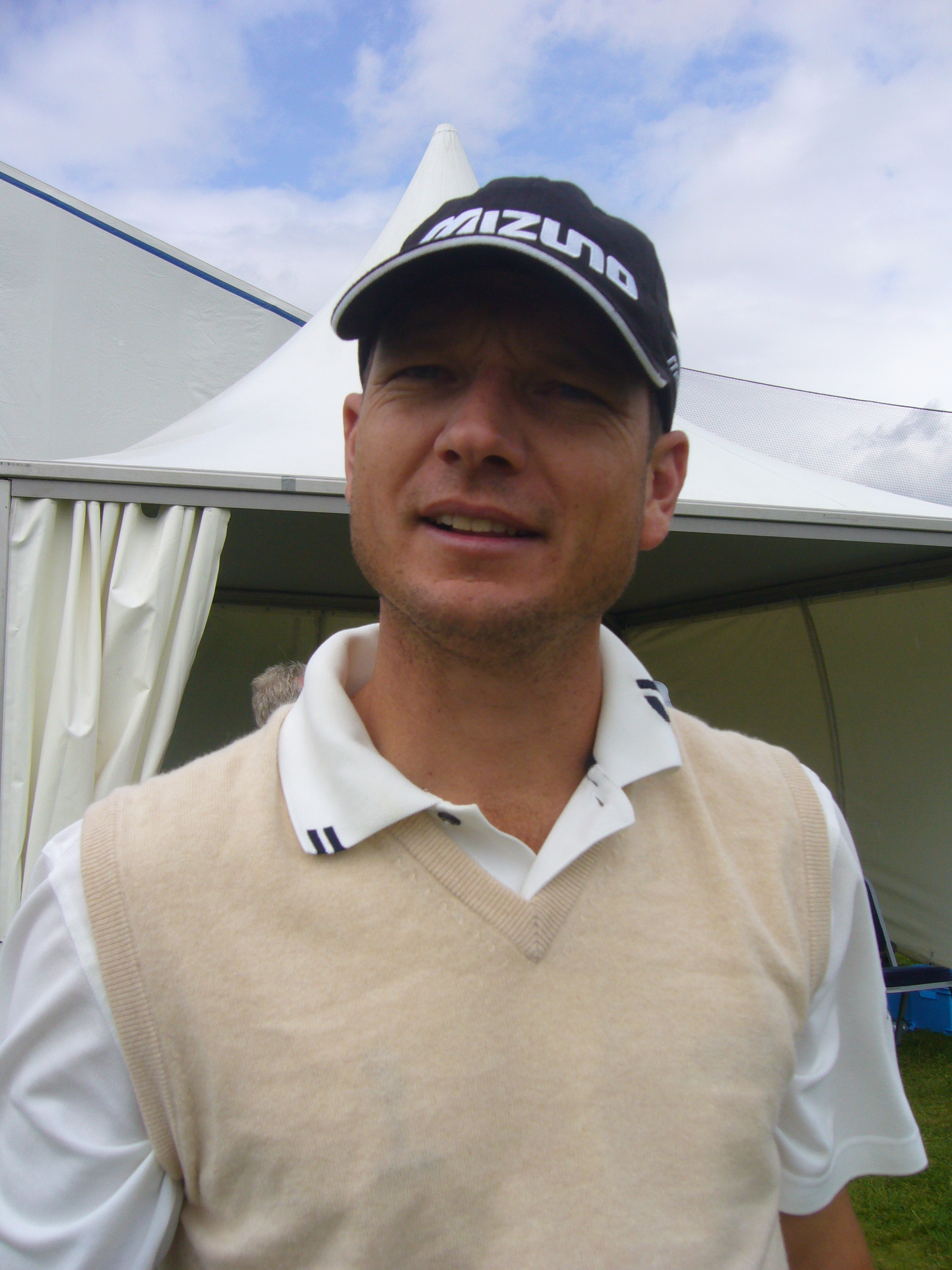

Personal information
- Full name: Andrew Ronald McLardy
- Nationality: South Africa
- Born: 20 January 1974 (age 52) Triangle, Zimbabwe
- Height: 1.83 m (6 ft 0 in)
- Weight: 72 kg (159 lb; 11.3 st)

Career
- Sport: Golf
- Turned professional: 1997
- Current tour: Sunshine Tour
- Former tours: PGA Tour; European Tour; Nationwide Tour
- Professional wins: 5

Number of wins by tour
- Sunshine Tour: 5

Best results in major championships
- Masters Tournament: DNP
- PGA Championship: DNP
- U.S. Open: T54: 2009
- The Open Championship: 75th: 1998

Andrew Ronald McLardy (born 20 January 1974) is a South African professional golfer.

== Career ==
McLardy was born in Triangle, Zimbabwe to Scottish parents. He had a successful amateur career, including representing South Africa twice in the Eisenhower Trophy, before turning professional in 1997. He joined the Southern Africa Tour, now the Sunshine Tour, where he has accumulated five wins.

In 1998, McLardy qualified for the European Tour via qualifying school. He finished inside the top 100 on the Order of Merit in both his first two seasons, before he moved to the United States to try his hand at the PGA Tour. He finished tied for fifth at the PGA Tour Qualifying Tournament in December 2000, to earn a card for the 2001 season. However, he was largely unsuccessful during his rookie season, and spent 2002 and 2003 on the second tier Nationwide Tour.

McLardy returned to Europe in 2004, regaining full playing status on the European Tour for 2005 through qualifying school. He finished every season from 2005 to 2009 inside the top 110 on the Order of Merit, with a career high ranking of 62nd in 2007.

== Professional wins (5) ==
=== Sunshine Tour wins (5) ===
Legend
Tour Championships (1)
Other Sunshine Tour (4)

No.	Date	Tournament	Winning score	Margin of victory	Runner-up
1	1 Nov 1997	Lombard Tyres Classic	−15 (71-66-66-70=273)	1 stroke	(South Africa) Justin Hobday
2	25 Apr 1998	Kalahari Classic	−11 (66-66-73=205)	3 strokes	(South Africa) Ryan Dreyer
3	24 Feb 2002	Royal Swazi Sun Open	−20 (69-72-63-64=268)	2 strokes	(South Africa) Nic Henning
4	8 Feb 2004	Nashua Masters	−16 (63-69-65-67=264)	3 strokes	(South Africa) Desvonde Botes
5	22 Feb 2004	The Tour Championship	−15 (69-66-66-72=273)	3 strokes	(South Africa) Louis Oosthuizen

== Results in major championships ==
Tournament	1998	1999
U.S. Open		
The Open Championship	75	

Tournament	2000	2001	2002	2003	2004	2005	2006	2007	2008	2009
U.S. Open										T54
The Open Championship										

Note: McLardy never played in the Masters Tournament or the PGA Championship.

Did not play

"T" = tied

== Results in World Golf Championships ==
Tournament	2004	2005	2006	2007	2008
Match Play					
Championship	T50				T48
Invitational	71				

Did not play

"T" = Tied

== Team appearances ==
- Eisenhower Trophy (representing South Africa): 1994, 1996

== See also ==
- 2000 PGA Tour Qualifying School graduates
- 2009 PGA Tour Qualifying School graduates
