= 2004–05 Sunshine Tour =

Golf tour season

2004–05 Sunshine Tour season
- Duration: 11 March 2004 – 27 February 2005
- Number of official events: 22
- Most wins: (South Africa) Thomas Aiken (3)
- Order of Merit: (South Africa) Charl Schwartzel
- Rookie of the Year: (Wales) Garry Houston

The 2004–05 Sunshine Tour was the 34th season of the Sunshine Tour (formerly the Southern Africa Tour), the main professional golf tour in South Africa since it was formed in 1971.

== Schedule ==
The following table lists official events during the 2004–05 season.

Date	Tournament	Location	Purse (R)	Winner (Note: The number in brackets after each winner's name is the number of Sunshine Tour events they had won up to and including that tournament. This information is only shown for Sunshine Tour members.)	OWGR points	Other tours (Note: CHA − Challenge Tour; EUR − European Tour.)	Notes
14 Mar	Stanbic Zambia Open	Zambia	€110,000	(South Africa) Michael Kirk (1)	10	CHA	
27 Mar	FNB Botswana Open	Botswana	250,000	(Zimbabwe) Barry Painting (1)	n/a		
2 Apr	Parmalat Classic	Eastern Cape	200,000	(South Africa) Justin Walters (1)	n/a		
8 May	Capital Alliance Royal Swazi Sun Open	Swaziland	400,000	(South Africa) Nic Henning (3)	n/a		
29 May	Vodacom Origins of Golf at Pezula	Western Cape	300,000	(South Africa) Patrick O'Brien (1)	n/a		New tournament series
12 Jun	Vodacom Origins of Golf at Schoeman Park	North West	300,000	(South Africa) Steve van Vuuren (6)	n/a		
20 Jun	Royal Swazi Sun Classic	Swaziland	250,000	(South Africa) Bradford Vaughan (4)	n/a		
2 Jul	Vodacom Origins of Golf at Zimbali	KwaZulu-Natal	300,000	(South Africa) Thomas Aiken (1)	n/a		
23 Jul	Vodacom Origins of Golf at Sun City	North West	300,000	(South Africa) Thomas Aiken (2)	n/a		
19 Sep	Vodacom Origins of Golf at Arabella	Western Cape	300,000	(South Africa) Louis Oosthuizen (1)	n/a		
10 Oct	Bearing Man Highveld Classic	Mpumalanga	250,000	(South Africa) Divan van den Heever (1)	n/a		
16 Oct	Limpopo Eskom Classic	Limpopo	500,000	(South Africa) Bradford Vaughan (5)	n/a		
21 Oct	Vodacom Origins of Golf Final	Western Cape	300,000	(South Africa) Thomas Aiken (3)	n/a		
30 Oct	Platinum Classic	North West	550,000	(South Africa) Titch Moore (5)	n/a		
6 Nov	MTC Namibia PGA Championship	Namibia	500,000	(South Africa) Mark Murless (2)	n/a		New tournament
13 Nov	Seekers Travel Pro-Am	Gauteng	230,000	(South Africa) Ulrich van den Berg (3)	n/a		
12 Dec	Dunhill Championship	Mpumalanga	£500,000	(South Africa) Charl Schwartzel (1)	18	EUR	
23 Jan	South African Airways Open	KwaZulu-Natal	£500,000	(South Africa) Tim Clark (2)	32	EUR	Flagship event
30 Jan	Dimension Data Pro-Am	North West	1,000,000	(England) Simon Wakefield (1)	12		Pro-Am
6 Feb	Nashua Masters	Eastern Cape	1,000,000	(South Africa) Richard Sterne (1)	12		
20 Feb	Telkom PGA Championship	Gauteng	1,750,000	(South Africa) Warren Abery (3)	12		
27 Feb	Vodacom Tour Championship	Gauteng	2,000,000	(Zimbabwe) Marc Cayeux (7)	12		Tour Championship

== Order of Merit ==
The Order of Merit was based on prize money won during the season, calculated in South African rand.

Position	Player	Prize money (R)
1	(South Africa) Charl Schwartzel	1,635,850
2	(England) Neil Cheetham	732,963
3	(South Africa) Warren Abery	704,837
4	(South Africa) Titch Moore	490,268
5	(Zimbabwe) Marc Cayeux	430,676

== Awards ==
Award	Winner	Ref.
Rookie of the Year (Bobby Locke Trophy)	(Wales) Garry Houston	
