= Lindani Ndwandwe =

South African professional golfer (born 1975)

Personal information
- Nationality: South Africa
- Born: 26 February 1975 (age 51) Nongoma, KwaZulu-Natal, South Africa

Career
- Sport: Golf
- Turned professional: 1998
- Current tour: Sunshine Tour
- Professional wins: 2

Number of wins by tour
- Sunshine Tour: 2

Lindani Ndwandwe (born 26 February 1975) is a South African professional golfer.

== Early life ==
Ndwandwe grew up in Nongoma, KwaZulu-Natal. He was introduced to the game by his brother Mandla who would use sticks and bottles as golf clubs and golf balls. He honed his skills as a caddie at Durban Country Club and Beachwood Golf Club.

== Amateur career ==
In 1997, Ndwandwe won two elite amateur events, the Natal Match Play and Natal Stroke Play events. He turned pro two years later and qualified for the Sunshine Tour in 2000.

== Professional career ==
Ndwandwe won the 2001 Western Cape Classic by a stroke over Richard Kaplan. He was the second black man to win on the Sunshine Tour. He recorded a number of runner-up finishes through the decade but would not win again until the 2009 Highveld Classic.

== Personal life ==
Ndwandwe has four children.

== Professional wins (2) ==
=== Sunshine Tour wins (2) ===
No.	Date	Tournament	Winning score	Margin of victory	Runner-up
1	20 Oct 2001	Western Cape Classic	−9 (66-70-71=207)	1 stroke	(South Africa) Richard Kaplan
2	25 Oct 2009	Highveld Classic	−19 (62-66-69=197)	Playoff	(South Africa) Alex Haindl

Sunshine Tour playoff record (1–1)

No.	Year	Tournament	Opponent(s)	Result
1	2006	Suncoast Classic	(South Africa) Alex Haindl, (South Africa) Bradford Vaughan	Haindl won with eagle on second extra hole
2	2009	Highveld Classic	(South Africa) Alex Haindl	Won with birdie on first extra hole
