= 2005–06 Sunshine Tour =

Golf tour season

2005–06 Sunshine Tour season
- Duration: 16 March 2005 – 26 February 2006
- Number of official events: 21
- Most wins: (South Africa) Thomas Aiken (2) (South Africa) Desvonde Botes (2) (South Africa) Bradford Vaughan (2)
- Order of Merit: (South Africa) Charl Schwartzel
- Rookie of the Year: (South Africa) Mohamed Tayob

The 2005–06 Sunshine Tour was the 35th season of the Sunshine Tour (formerly the Southern Africa Tour), the main professional golf tour in South Africa since it was formed in 1971.

== Schedule ==
The following table lists official events during the 2005–06 season.

Date	Tournament	Location	Purse (R)	Winner (Note: The number in brackets after each winner's name is the number of Sunshine Tour events they had won up to and including that tournament. This information is only shown for Sunshine Tour members.)	OWGR points	Other tours (Note: ANZ − PGA Tour of Australasia; ASA − Asian Tour; EUR − European Tour.)	Notes
19 Mar	FNB Botswana Open	Botswana	250,000	(South Africa) Nico van Rensburg (3)	n/a		
9 Apr	Parmalat Classic	Eastern Cape	300,000	(South Africa) Ulrich van den Berg (4)	n/a		
7 May	Capital Alliance Royal Swazi Sun Open	Swaziland	500,000	(South Africa) Hendrik Buhrmann (4)	n/a		
13 May	Vodacom Origins of Golf at Pretoria	Gauteng	330,000	(South Africa) Desvonde Botes (10)	n/a		
27 May	Vodacom Origins of Golf at Pezula	Western Cape	330,000	(South Africa) Desvonde Botes (11)	n/a		
1 Jul	Vodacom Origins of Golf at Wild Coast Sun	Eastern Cape	330,000	(South Africa) Dean Lambert (1)	n/a		
26 Aug	Vodacom Origins of Golf at Bloemfontein	Free State	330,000	(South Africa) Nic Henning (4)	n/a		
2 Sep	Telkom PGA Pro-Am	Gauteng	300,000	(South Africa) Thomas Aiken (4)	n/a		New tournament
9 Sep	Vodacom Origins of Golf at Erinvale	Western Cape	330,000	(South Africa) Hennie Otto (6)	n/a		
1 Oct	Seekers Travel Pro-Am	Gauteng	300,000	(South Africa) Anton Haig (1)	n/a		
9 Oct	Bearing Man Highveld Classic	Mpumalanga	400,000	(South Africa) Bradford Vaughan (6)	n/a		
15 Oct	MTC Namibia PGA Championship	Namibia	500,000	(South Africa) Thomas Aiken (5)	n/a		
21 Oct	Vodacom Origins of Golf Final	Western Cape	400,000	(South Africa) Steve Basson (1)	n/a		
29 Oct	Platinum Classic	North West	500,000	(South Africa) Jaco van Zyl (1)	n/a		
20 Nov	Limpopo Classic	Limpopo	1,000,000	(South Africa) Bradford Vaughan (7)	18		
11 Dec	Dunhill Championship	Mpumalanga	€1,000,000	(South Africa) Ernie Els (13)	20	EUR	
18 Dec	South African Airways Open	Western Cape	€1,000,000	(South Africa) Retief Goosen (5)	32	EUR	Flagship event
29 Jan	Dimension Data Pro-Am	North West	1,000,000	(Scotland) Alan McLean (2)	12		Pro-Am
5 Feb	Nashua Masters	Eastern Cape	1,000,000	(South Africa) Warren Abery (4)	12		
19 Feb	Telkom PGA Championship	Gauteng	2,000,000	(France) Grégory Bourdy (1)	12		
26 Feb	Vodacom Tour Championship	Gauteng	2,000,000	(South Africa) Charl Schwartzel (2)	12		Tour Championship

=== Unofficial events ===
The following events were sanctioned by the Sunshine Tour, but did not carry official money, nor were wins official.

Date	Tournament	Location	Purse (R)	Winner	OWGR points	Other tours	Notes
13 Nov	HSBC Champions	China	US$5,000,000	(England) David Howell	48	ANZ, (Note: PGA Tour of Australasia unofficial event) ASA, (Note: Asian Tour unofficial event) EUR	New limited-field event

== Order of Merit ==
The Order of Merit was based on prize money won during the season, calculated in South African rand.

Position	Player	Prize money (R)
1	(South Africa) Charl Schwartzel	1,207,460
2	(France) Grégory Bourdy	936,394
3	(South Africa) Louis Oosthuizen	842,092
4	(South Africa) Thomas Aiken	779,566
5	(South Africa) Darren Fichardt	763,324

== Awards ==
Award	Winner	Ref.
Rookie of the Year (Bobby Locke Trophy)	(South Africa) Mohamed Tayob	
