= Titch Moore =

South African professional golfer (born 1976)

Personal information
- Full name: Trevor Richard Moore
- Nickname: Titch
- Nationality: South Africa
- Born: 18 February 1976 (age 50) Port Elizabeth, South Africa
- Height: 1.81 m (5 ft 11 in)
- Weight: 92 kg (203 lb; 14.5 st)

Career
- Sport: Golf
- Turned professional: 1997
- Current tour: Sunshine Tour
- Former tour: European Tour
- Professional wins: 13

Number of wins by tour
- Sunshine Tour: 10
- Challenge Tour: 1
- Other: 2

Trevor Richard "Titch" Moore (born 18 February 1976) is a South African professional golfer. He currently plays on the Sunshine Tour, where he has won 10 times between 2000 and 2016.

== Career ==
In 1976, Moore was born in Port Elizabeth, South Africa. In 1997, he turned pro in 1997 and joined the Sunshine Tour in that same year. His best finish on the Order of Merit for the Sunshine Tour came in the 2004–05 season where he finished 4th. He has also played on the European Tour, and the second tier Challenge Tour, where he won the Skandia PGA Open in 2003.

== Amateur wins ==
- 1993 World Under 17 Championship, Western Province Amateur Championship, Transvaal Amateur Championship, Eastern Province Amateur Championship
- 1995 World International Masters
- 1996 South African Amateur, South African Amateur Stroke Play Championship

== Professional wins (13) ==
=== Sunshine Tour wins (10) ===
No.	Date	Tournament	Winning score	Margin of victory	Runner(s)-up
1	18 Mar 2000	Cock of The North	−2 (74-70-73=217)	1 stroke	(South Africa) Brett Liddle, (Republic of Ireland) James Loughnane, (South Africa) John Mashego, (South Africa) Grant Muller
2	22 Apr 2001	Royal Swazi Sun Classic	−16 (65-70-65=200)	Playoff	(South Africa) Keith Horne
3	6 Oct 2002	Bearing Man Highveld Classic	−20 (64-65-67=196)	5 strokes	(South Africa) Ashley Roestoff
4	3 Nov 2002	Platinum Classic	−18 (65-66-67=198)	5 strokes	(Scotland) Doug McGuigan
5	30 Oct 2004	Platinum Classic (2)	−16 (64-70-66=200)	3 strokes	(South Africa) Hennie Otto
6	28 Sep 2007	Vodacom Origins of Golf Final	−7 (68-71-70=209)	3 strokes	(South Africa) Ulrich van den Berg
7	22 Nov 2007	Coca-Cola Charity Championship	−5 (67-72-72=211)	4 strokes	(South Africa) Steve Basson, (South Africa) James Kingston, (South Africa) Louis Oosthuizen
8	6 Apr 2014	Telkom Business PGA Championship	−15 (68-69-69-67=273)	Playoff	(South Africa) Ulrich van den Berg
9	10 Oct 2014	Sun Boardwalk Golf Challenge	−4 (70-70=140)	1 stroke	(South Africa) Roberto Lupini, (England) Steve Surry
10	7 May 2016	Investec Royal Swazi Open	60 pts (10-16-16-18=60)	11 points	(Brazil) Adilson da Silva

Sunshine Tour playoff record (2–3)

No.	Year	Tournament	Opponent	Result
1	2001	Royal Swazi Sun Classic	(South Africa) Keith Horne	Won with bogey on second extra hole
2	2007	Nashua Masters	(South Africa) Jean Hugo	Lost to par on first extra hole
3	2009	MTC Namibia PGA Championship	(South Africa) Hennie Otto	Lost to par on first extra hole
4	2013	Vodacom Origins of Golf Final	(South Africa) J. J. Senekal	Lost to par on second extra hole
5	2014	Telkom Business PGA Championship	(South Africa) Ulrich van den Berg	Won with birdie on fifth extra hole

=== Challenge Tour wins (1) ===
No.	Date	Tournament	Winning score	Margin of victory	Runner-up
1	31 Aug 2003	Skandia PGA Open	−11 (72-68-65-68=273)	2 strokes	(Argentina) Sebastián Fernández

=== Other wins (2) ===
- 2 wins on mini-tours in the United States
