= Nic Henning =

South African professional golfer (born 1969)

Personal information
- Nationality: South Africa
- Born: 26 April 1969 (age 57) Silver Lakes, Pretoria, South Africa
- Height: 1.83 m (6 ft 0 in)

Career
- Sport: Golf
- Turned professional: 1992
- Former tours: Sunshine Tour; European Tour
- Professional wins: 4

Number of wins by tour
- Sunshine Tour: 4

Best results in major championships
- Masters Tournament: DNP
- PGA Championship: DNP
- U.S. Open: DNP
- The Open Championship: CUT: 2000

Nic Henning (born 26 April 1969) is a South African professional golfer.

== Early life ==
In 1969, Henning was born Pretoria, South Africa. He states he had "no choice" but to become a professional golfer as he was born into a big golfing family; his father, Graham Henning, and three of his uncles were professional golfers.

== Professional career ==
In 1992, he turned professional. Henning qualified for the Sunshine Tour before the 1992–93 season. His best performance during his early years was a runner-up performance at the Zimbabwe Open at the beginning of the 1993–94 season.

Henning qualified for the European Tour before the 1994 season. He did not play well, recording only one top-10 and did not come close to keeping his card.

He returned to South Africa where he played for the remainder of the 1990s and recorded several top-10s before finally winning the 1999 Vodacom Players Championship. Henning defeated Northern Ireland's Darren Clarke, then one of the top players in the world, in a playoff. He still regards it as his top achievement as a professional. He would finish in second place on the South African Tour's Order of Merit for the 1999–2000 season.

The following year, Henning qualified for his only major championship, the 2000 Open Championship, and his only World Golf Championship event, the WGC-American Express Championship. He missed the cut at the Open but finished T-17 at the WGC event held at Valderrama Golf Club, even placing in the top-10 after the first round.

In 2001, he qualified for the European Tour for the second time. At two early events in South America, he recorded consecutive top-10s but his play quickly regressed after that. He would finish #145 on the Order of Merit and did not keep his card.

Henning returned to South Africa during the early 2000s and would have much success. He won the 2003 Royal Swazi Sun Classic and the 2004 Capital Alliance Royal Swazi Sun Open. He recorded his fourth and final win at the 2005 Vodacom Origins of Golf Tour defeating Doug McGuigan by a shot. Later in the year, in October, he tied Anton Haig after four rounds at the Seekers Travel Pro-Am but lost to him in a playoff. In 2008, he also finished the Nashua Golf Challenge and MTC Namibia PGA Championship tied in regulation but lost both in playoffs.

== Professional wins (4) ==
=== Sunshine Tour wins (4) ===
No.	Date	Tournament	Winning score	Margin of victory	Runner-up
1	12 Dec 1999	Vodacom Players Championship	−12 (67-67-72-70=276)	Playoff	(Northern Ireland) Darren Clarke
2	22 Jun 2003	Royal Swazi Sun Classic	−18 (65-66-67=198)	2 strokes	(South Africa) Mark Murless
3	8 May 2004	Capital Alliance Royal Swazi Sun Open	42 pts (10-4-9-19=42)	1 point	(South Africa) Titch Moore
4	26 Aug 2005	Vodacom Origins of Golf at Bloemfontein	−11 (68-70-67=205)	1 stroke	(Scotland) Doug McGuigan

Sunshine Tour playoff record (1–3)

No.	Year	Tournament	Opponent(s)	Result
1	1999	Vodacom Players Championship	(Northern Ireland) Darren Clarke	Won with birdie on second extra hole
2	2005	Seekers Travel Pro-Am	(South Africa) Anton Haig	Lost to par on first extra hole
3	2008	Nashua Golf Challenge	(South Africa) Keith Horne	Lost to par on second extra hole
4	2008	MTC Namibia PGA Championship	(South Africa) Merrick Bremner, (Zimbabwe) Tongoona Charamba	Charamba won with birdie on third extra hole Henning eliminated by par on second hole

== Results in major championships ==
Tournament	2000
The Open Championship	CUT

CUT = missed the half-way cut
Note: Henning only played in The Open Championship.

== Results in World Golf Championships ==
Tournament	2000
Match Play	
Championship	T17
Invitational	

Did not play

"T" = Tied

== Team appearances ==
- World Cup (representing South Africa): 1998
