= Doug McGuigan =

Scottish-South African professional golfer

Personal information
- Full name: Douglas Gordon McGuigan
- Nationality: Scotland; South Africa
- Born: 7 August 1970 (age 56) Durban, South Africa
- Height: 1.83 m (6 ft 0 in)

Career
- Sport: Golf
- Turned professional: 1989
- Current tours: Sunshine Tour; European Senior Tour
- Former tour: Canadian Tour
- Professional wins: 8

Number of wins by tour
- Sunshine Tour: 8

Best results in major championships
- Masters Tournament: DNP
- PGA Championship: DNP
- U.S. Open: DNP
- The Open Championship: CUT: 2005, 2007, 2008

Douglas Gordon McGuigan (born 7 August 1970) is a South African-born professional golfer who represents Scotland. He has won eight times on the Sunshine Tour between 2003 and 2017.

== Career ==
McGuigan was born in Durban. His father, Francis McGuigan, was a Scottish-born professional footballer who played for Falkirk, Blackpool, and Durban United. He stayed in South Africa permanently after the end of his career.

After winning three West Coast Tour events as an amateur, he turned professional in 1989. He first played on the Sunshine Tour in 1993. He has also played on the Canadian Tour.

== Personal life ==
McGuigan lives in Johannesburg, South Africa.

== Professional wins (8) ==
=== Sunshine Tour wins (8) ===
No.	Date	Tournament	Winning score	Margin of victory	Runner(s)-up
1	1 Nov 2003	Platinum Classic	−17 (68-64-67=199)	1 stroke	(South Africa) Ashley Roestoff
2	25 Aug 2006	Telkom PGA Pro-Am	−11 (68-67-70=205)	2 strokes	(South Africa) Desvonde Botes, (South Africa) Hennie Otto
3	12 Oct 2008	BMG Classic	−10 (68-70-68=206)	1 stroke	(South Africa) Jaco van Zyl
4	16 May 2009	Nashua Golf Challenge	−7 (66-70-73=209)	2 strokes	(South Africa) Tyrone van Aswegen
5	16 Oct 2011	KCM Zambia Open	−16 (69-68-66-69=272)	Playoff	(South Africa) Jean Hugo
6	4 Nov 2012	ISPS Handa Match Play Championship	1 up		(South Africa) Jaco Ahlers
7	29 Jul 2017	Vodacom Origins of Golf at Highland Gate	−10 (68-68-70=206)	1 stroke	(South Africa) Brandon Stone
8	23 Sep 2017	Vodacom Origins of Golf (2) at St Francis	−13 (69-68-66=203)	2 strokes	(South Africa) Hennie du Plessis

Sunshine Tour playoff record (1–1)

No.	Year	Tournament	Opponent(s)	Result
1	2003	Dunhill Championship	(England) Mark Foster, (Denmark) Anders Hansen, (South Africa) Trevor Immelman, (Scotland) Paul Lawrie, (South Africa) Bradford Vaughan	Foster won with eagle on second extra hole Hansen and McGuigan eliminated by birdie on first hole
2	2011	KCM Zambia Open	(South Africa) Jean Hugo	Won with birdie on fifth extra hole

== Playoff record ==
European Tour playoff record (0–1)

No.	Year	Tournament	Opponents	Result
1	2003	Dunhill Championship	(England) Mark Foster, (Denmark) Anders Hansen, (South Africa) Trevor Immelman, (Scotland) Paul Lawrie, (South Africa) Bradford Vaughan	Foster won with eagle on second extra hole Hansen and McGuigan eliminated by birdie on first hole

== Results in major championships ==
Tournament	2005	2006	2007	2008
The Open Championship	CUT		CUT	CUT

Did not play

CUT = missed the halfway cut
Note: McGuigan only played in The Open Championship.
