= Hennie Otto =

South African professional golfer

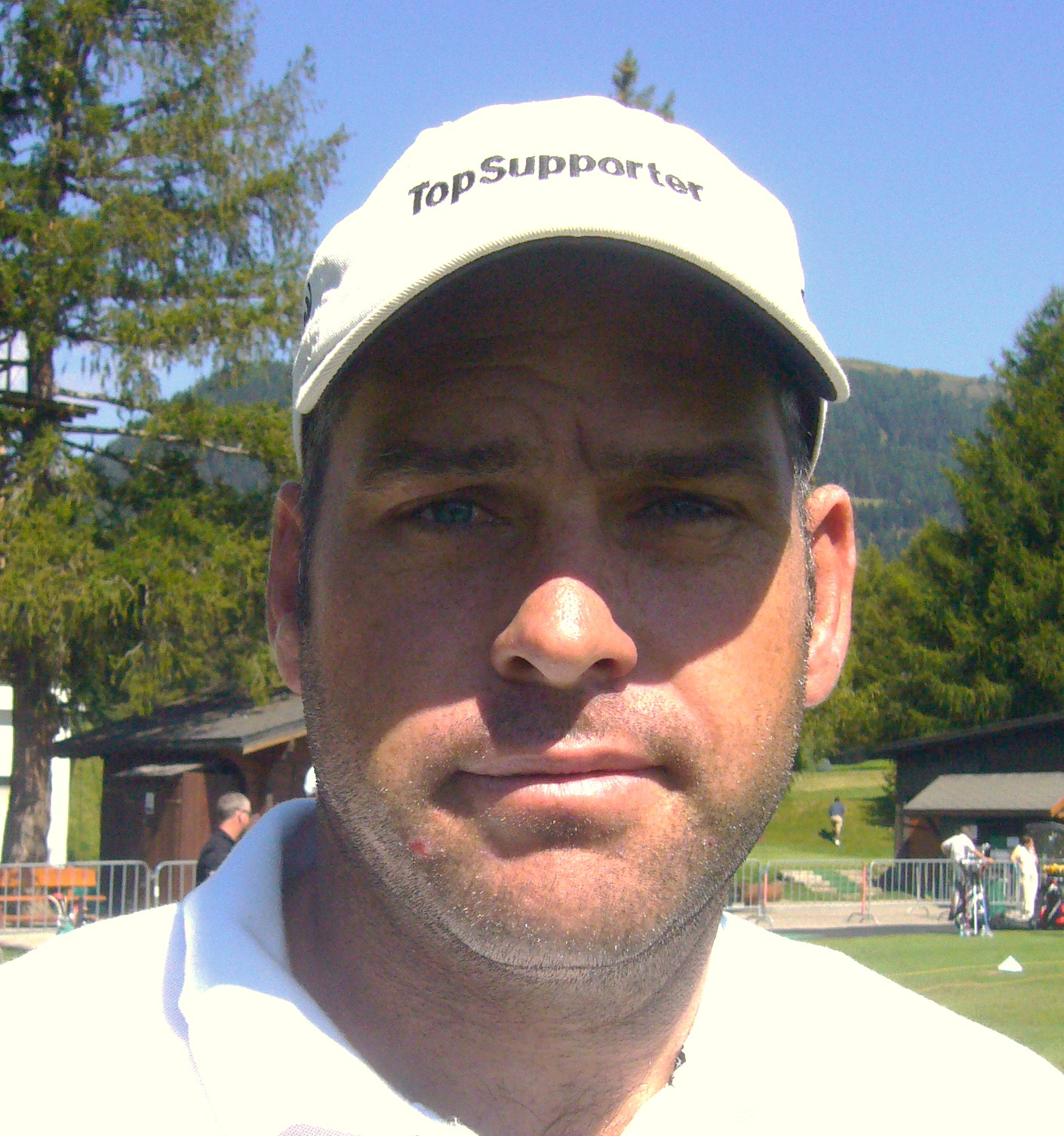

Personal information
- Full name: Hendrik Johannes Otto
- Nationality: South Africa
- Born: 25 June 1976 (age 50) Boksburg, South Africa
- Height: 1.76 m (5 ft 9 in)
- Weight: 82 kg (181 lb; 12.9 st)

Career
- Sport: Golf
- Turned professional: 1998
- Current tour: Sunshine Tour
- Former tours: European Tour; Challenge Tour
- Professional wins: 17
- Highest ranking: 73 (8 June 2008)

Number of wins by tour
- European Tour: 3
- Sunshine Tour: 14
- Challenge Tour: 1

Best results in major championships
- Masters Tournament: DNP
- PGA Championship: CUT: 2008
- U.S. Open: DNP
- The Open Championship: T10: 2003

Hendrik Johannes "Hennie" Otto (born 25 June 1976) is a South African professional golfer.

== Career ==
Otto was born in Boksburg. He earned a place on the European Tour for 2000 by graduating from the Challenge Tour but struggled to establish himself on the tour. In 2003, while splitting time between the European and Challenge Tours, he finished tied for tenth at The Open Championship in his major championship début and went on to finish 73rd in the European Tour Order of Merit. In 2008, again playing with limited European Tour status, he won the Italian Open and finished 37th on the Order of Merit. The win gave him full membership for the first time since 2004; this he maintained through the 2017 season, winning the 2011 South African Open Championship and the Italian Open again three years later.

Including the South African Open win, Otto has won 14 times on the Sunshine Tour since 1999.

== Professional wins (17) ==
=== European Tour wins (3) ===
No.	Date	Tournament	Winning score	Margin of victory	Runner-up
1	11 May 2008	Methorios Capital Italian Open	−25 (65-66-63-69=263)	1 stroke	(England) Oliver Wilson
2	27 Nov 2011	SA Open Championship^{1}	−14 (70-67-65-72=274)	1 stroke	(Austria) Bernd Wiesberger
3	31 Aug 2014	Open d'Italia (2)	−20 (67-62-71-68=268)	2 strokes	(England) David Howell

^{1}Co-sanctioned by the Sunshine Tour

European Tour playoff record (0–1)

No.	Year	Tournament	Opponent	Result
1	2008	Madeira Islands Open BPI - Portugal	(Scotland) Alastair Forsyth	Lost to birdie on first extra hole

=== Sunshine Tour wins (14) ===
Legend
Flagship events (1)
Tour Championships (1)
Other Sunshine Tour (12)

No.	Date	Tournament	Winning score	Margin of victory	Runner(s)-up
1	8 May 1999	Pietersburg Classic	−17 (65-65-69=199)	4 strokes	(South Africa) Ashley Roestoff, (South Africa) Des Terblanche
2	12 Jun 1999	Vodacom Series (KwaZulu-Natal)	−11 (69-64-69=202)	4 strokes	(South Africa) Ashley Roestoff
3	11 May 2002	Limpopo Industrelek Classic	−14 (66-67-69=202)	1 stroke	(South Africa) Des Terblanche
4	24 Nov 2002	Nashua Masters	−1 (67-70-73-69=279)	1 stroke	(Republic of Ireland) Ciaran McMonagle, (Republic of Ireland) Gavin McNeill, (Zimbabwe) Mark McNulty, (South Africa) Roger Wessels
5	2 Feb 2003	The Tour Championship	−17 (71-64-68-68=271)	2 strokes	(South Africa) Trevor Immelman
6	9 Sep 2005	Vodacom Origins of Golf at Erinvale	−14 (71-63-68=202)	1 stroke	(South Africa) Thomas Aiken
7	11 May 2007	Vodacom Origins of Golf (2) at Pretoria	−15 (67-65-69=201)	3 strokes	(South Africa) James Kamte
8	15 Nov 2009	MTC Namibia PGA Championship	−8 (72-70-72-66=280)	Playoff	(South Africa) Titch Moore
9	28 Feb 2010	Vodacom Championship (2)	−28 (65-61-67-67=260)	9 strokes	(South Africa) Jbe' Kruger
10	20 Feb 2011	Dimension Data Pro-Am	−16 (68-71-66-68=273)	4 strokes	(South Africa) James Kingston
11	1 Oct 2011	Platinum Classic	−17 (69-63-67=199)	2 strokes	(South Africa) Darren Fichardt
12	27 Nov 2011	SA Open Championship^{1}	−14 (70-67-65-72=274)	1 stroke	(Austria) Bernd Wiesberger
13	25 Oct 2019	Sibaya Challenge	−13 (69-66-62=197)	1 stroke	(South Africa) James Hart du Preez
14	2 Jun 2023	SunBet Challenge (Sun City)	−6 (71-72-67=210)	Playoff	(South Africa) Hayden Griffiths

^{1}Co-sanctioned by the European Tour

Sunshine Tour playoff record (2–3)

No.	Year	Tournament	Opponent(s)	Result
1	2009	MTC Namibia PGA Championship	(South Africa) Titch Moore	Won with par on first extra hole
2	2013	Investec Cup	(South Africa) Jaco van Zyl	Lost to par on first extra hole
3	2014	Lion of Africa Cape Town Open	(South Africa) Jaco Ahlers, (England) Ross McGowan	Ahlers won with par on fourth extra hole Otto eliminated by par on first hole
4	2023	SunBet Challenge (Sun City)	(South Africa) Hayden Griffiths	Won with par on first extra hole
5	2026	Circa Cape Town Open	(England) Will Enefer	Lost to birdie on first extra hole

=== Challenge Tour wins (1) ===
No.	Date	Tournament	Winning score	Margin of victory	Runner-up
1	10 Oct 1999	Philips Challenge Xacobeo 99	−10 (74-69-66-69=278)	Playoff	(Spain) Pello Iguaran

Challenge Tour playoff record (1–1)

No.	Year	Tournament	Opponent	Result
1	1999	Philips Challenge Xacobeo 99	(Spain) Pello Iguaran	Won with birdie on first extra hole
2	2026	Circa Cape Town Open	(England) Will Enefer	Lost to birdie on first extra hole

== Results in major championships ==
Tournament	2003	2004	2005	2006	2007	2008
The Open Championship	T10	CUT				CUT
PGA Championship						CUT

Top 10
Did not play

CUT = missed the half-way cut
"T" = tied
Note: Otto never played in the Masters Tournament or the U.S. Open.

== Results in World Golf Championships ==
Tournament	2003	2004	2005	2006	2007	2008	2009	2010	2011	2012	2013	2014
Match Play												
Championship	T48				T63					50		
Invitational	T77							T65	T29			
Champions										T62		T53

Did not play

"T" = Tied
Note that the HSBC Champions did not become a WGC event until 2009.

== Team appearances ==
Amateur

- Eisenhower Trophy (representing South Africa): 1996
