= Africa Open =

Golf tournament held in South Africa

Coordinates: 32°S 27°E

Tournament information
- Location: Eastern Cape, South Africa
- Established: 2008
- Course: East London Golf Club
- Par: 71
- Length: 6,616 yards (6,050 m)
- Tours: Sunshine Tour; European Tour
- Format: Stroke play
- Prize fund: R 14,500,000
- Month played: February
- Final year: 2015

Tournament record score
- Aggregate: 264 Thomas Aiken (2014); 264 Trevor Fisher Jnr (2015)
- To par: −27 Louis Oosthuizen (2012)

Final champion
- (South Africa) Trevor Fisher Jnr

Location map
- Location in South Africa Location in Eastern Cape

The Africa Open was a golf tournament on the Sunshine Tour held in Eastern Cape, South Africa. It was first contested in February 2008, over the Gary Player designed championship course at the Fish River Sun Country Club, near Port Alfred.

In order to increase the profile of the tournament, beginning in 2009 it was held in January at the East London Golf Club in East London. In 2009, the Africa Open had a prize fund of R5 million, over four times that of the inaugural event. The Sunshine Tour hoped that it would attract a stronger field as a result, and possibly lead to a co-sanctioning agreement with the European Tour in subsequent years.

In 2009, it was announced that the Africa Open would be included on the 2010 European Tour schedule. It was the third event of the four tournament South African swing of the tour, held after the Alfred Dunhill Championship and the South African Open, and the week before the Joburg Open. The purse for 2014 was €1,000,000.

== Winners ==
Year	Tour(s) (Note: AFR − Sunshine Tour; EUR − European Tour.)	Winner	Score	To par	Margin of victory	Runner(s)-up
Africa Open
2015	AFR, EUR	(South Africa) Trevor Fisher Jnr	264	−24	5 strokes	(England) Matt Ford
2014	AFR, EUR	(South Africa) Thomas Aiken	264	−20	Playoff	(England) Oliver Fisher
2013	AFR, EUR	(South Africa) Darren Fichardt	272	−16	2 strokes	(France) Grégory Bourdy (South Africa) Jaco van Zyl
2012	AFR, EUR	(South Africa) Louis Oosthuizen (2)	265	−27	2 strokes	(South Africa) Tjaart van der Walt
2011	AFR, EUR	(South Africa) Louis Oosthuizen	276	−16	Playoff	(Spain) Manuel Quirós (England) Chris Wood
2010	AFR, EUR	(South Africa) Charl Schwartzel	272	−20	1 stroke	(South Africa) Thomas Aiken
Africa Open Golf Challenge
2009	AFR	(South Africa) Retief Goosen	267	−21	1 stroke	(Northern Ireland) Darren Clarke (South Africa) Darren Fichardt (South Africa) Branden Grace (Northern Ireland) Michael Hoey
Africa Open
2008	AFR	(South Africa) Shaun Norris	275	−13	6 strokes	(South Africa) Nic Henning
