= Suncoast Classic =

Tournament information
- Location: Durban, KwaZulu-Natal South Africa
- Established: 2006
- Course: Durban Country Club
- Par: 72
- Length: 6,732 yards (6,156 m)
- Tour: Sunshine Tour
- Format: Stroke play
- Prize fund: R 600,000
- Month played: October
- Final year: 2012

Tournament record score
- Aggregate: 196 Adilson da Silva (2010)
- To par: −20 as above

Final champion
- (South Africa) Ruan de Smidt

Location map
- Location in South Africa Location in KwaZulu-Natal

The Suncoast Classic was a golf tournament on the Southern Africa based Sunshine Tour. It was founded in 2006 and has always been held at the Durban Country Club in Durban, KwaZulu-Natal, South Africa.

== Winners ==
| Year | Winner | Score | To par | Margin of victory | Runner(s)-up |
|---|---|---|---|---|---|
| 2012 | (South Africa) Ruan de Smidt | 208 | −8 | 4 strokes | (South Africa) Vaughn Groenewald |
| 2011 | (South Africa) Darren Fichardt | 203 | −13 | 6 strokes | (South Africa) Ulrich van den Berg |
| 2010 | (Brazil) Adilson da Silva (2) | 196 | −20 | 4 strokes | (South Africa) Jean Hugo |
| 2009 | (South Africa) Louis de Jager | 207 | −9 | 2 strokes | (South Africa) Chris Swanepoel |
| 2008 | (South Africa) Jake Roos | 210 | −6 | Playoff | (South Africa) Omar Sandys |
| 2007 | (Brazil) Adilson da Silva | 208 | −8 | 1 stroke | (Scotland) Doug McGuigan |
| 2006 | (South Africa) Alex Haindl | 207 | −9 | Playoff | (South Africa) Lindani Ndwandwe (South Africa) Bradford Vaughan |
