= Justin Harding =

South African professional golfer

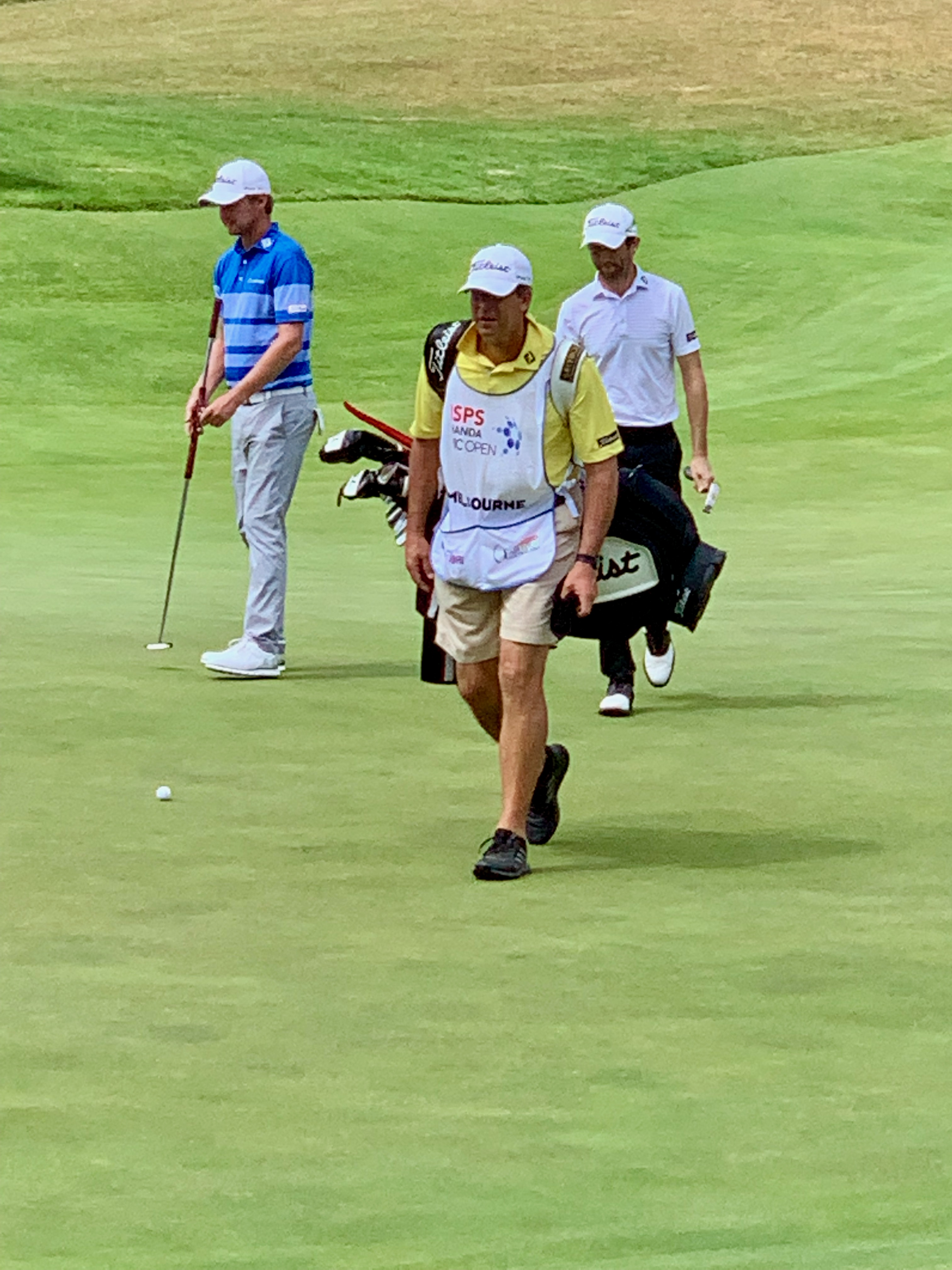

Personal information
- Full name: Justin Adam Harding
- Nationality: South Africa
- Born: 9 February 1986 (age 40) Somerset West, Western Cape, South Africa
- Height: 1.85 m (6 ft 1 in)
- Weight: 176 lb (80 kg; 12.6 st)

Career
- Sport: Golf
- College: Lamar University
- Turned professional: 2010
- Current tours: Asian Tour; Challenge Tour; Sunshine Tour
- Former tours: LIV Golf; European Tour
- Professional wins: 12
- Highest ranking: 42 (12 May 2019)

Number of wins by tour
- European Tour: 2
- Asian Tour: 2
- Sunshine Tour: 7
- Challenge Tour: 1

Best results in major championships
- Masters Tournament: T12: 2019
- PGA Championship: T54: 2019
- U.S. Open: CUT: 2019, 2020
- The Open Championship: T19: 2021

Justin Adam Harding (born 9 February 1986) is a South African professional golfer.

== Amateur career ==
Harding attended Paul Roos Gymnasium in Stellenbosch, South Africa, and played college golf at Lamar University in Texas and represented his country as an amateur golfer.

== Professional career ==
Having graduated, he earned a place on the Sunshine Tour at the first attempt, finishing third at the 2009 qualifying school while still an amateur. He won a tournament in each of his first three seasons on the tour, 2010, 2011 and 2012. He won again in 2015 and 2016 and then twice in two weeks in 2018.

In July 2018 Harding made a rare appearance outside Africa and won the Bank BRI Indonesia Open on the Asian Tour by a stroke from Scott Vincent. Two weeks later he won the Royal Cup in Thailand by 6 strokes, his fourth win in three months.

Alan Burns has caddied full time for Harding since October 2018.

In March 2019, Harding got his first European Tour victory by winning the Commercial Bank Qatar Masters by two strokes over nine runners-up. He was a joint runner-up in the Kenya Open the following week, a result that lifted him into the world top 50 and gave him an entry into the 2019 Masters Tournament. He finished in a share of 12th place to earn his place at the 2020 Masters Tournament.

In March 2021, Harding shot a final-round 66 to win the Magical Kenya Open by two shots ahead of Kurt Kitayama.

== Amateur wins ==
- 2005 Sanlam Cape Province Open, Western Province Strokeplay Open, Vodacom North West Open
- 2006 Pilsner Urquell Southern Cape Open Champion

== Professional wins (12) ==
=== European Tour wins (2) ===
No.	Date	Tournament	Winning score	Margin of victory	Runner(s)-up
1	10 Mar 2019	Commercial Bank Qatar Masters	−13 (68-68-73-66=275)	2 strokes	(South Africa) Christiaan Bezuidenhout, (Spain) Jorge Campillo, (South Korea) Choi Jin-ho, (South Africa) George Coetzee, (Spain) Nacho Elvira, (Sweden) Anton Karlsson, (France) Mike Lorenzo-Vera, (South Africa) Erik van Rooyen, (England) Oliver Wilson
2	21 Mar 2021	Magical Kenya Open	−21 (66-67-64-66=263)	2 strokes	(United States) Kurt Kitayama

European Tour playoff record (0–1)

No.	Year	Tournament	Opponent	Result
1	2021	Cazoo Open	(Spain) Nacho Elvira	Lost to par on first extra hole

=== Asian Tour wins (2) ===
No.	Date	Tournament	Winning score	Margin of victory	Runner(s)-up
1	15 Jul 2018	Bank BRI Indonesia Open	−18 (67-66-66-71=270)	1 stroke	(Zimbabwe) Scott Vincent
2	29 Jul 2018	Royal Cup	−14 (64-64-71-67=266)	6 strokes	(India) Shiv Kapur, (United States) Kurt Kitayama, (Australia) Jake McLeod, (Thailand) Chapchai Nirat

=== Sunshine Tour wins (7) ===
No.	Date	Tournament	Winning score	Margin of victory	Runner-up
1	15 Oct 2010	Vodacom Origins of Golf Final	−7 (68-70-71=209)	1 stroke	(South Africa) Ulrich van den Berg
2	5 Jun 2011	Lombard Insurance Classic	−14 (64-68-70=202)	1 stroke	(England) Neil Cheetham
3	17 Jun 2012	Indo Zambia Bank Zambia Open	−12 (71-72-69-68=280)	2 strokes	(South Africa) Divan van den Heever
4	6 Jun 2015	Vodacom Origins of Golf (2) at Langebaan	−8 (72-68-68=208)	Playoff	(South Africa) Vaughn Groenewald
5	1 Oct 2016	Vodacom Origins of Golf (3) at Simola	−14 (68-64-70=202)	1 stroke	(South Africa) Ockie Strydom
6	12 May 2018	Investec Royal Swazi Open	47 pts (10-6-13-18=47)	1 point	(South Africa) Lyle Rowe
7	20 May 2018	Lombard Insurance Classic (2)	−20 (66-64-66=196)	Playoff	(South Africa) Jake Roos

Sunshine Tour playoff record (2–2)

No.	Year	Tournament	Opponent	Result
1	2012	Lombard Insurance Classic	(South Africa) Jake Roos	Lost to par on first extra hole
2	2015	Vodacom Origins of Golf at Langebaan	(South Africa) Vaughn Groenewald	Won with birdie on first extra hole
3	2017	Lombard Insurance Classic	(South Africa) Oliver Bekker	Lost to par on first extra hole
4	2018	Lombard Insurance Classic	(South Africa) Jake Roos	Won with birdie on sixth extra hole

=== Challenge Tour wins (1) ===
No.	Date	Tournament	Winning score	Margin of victory	Runners-up
1	16 Aug 2026	Irish Challenge	−13 (65-70-69-71=275)	1 stroke	(South Africa) Louis Albertse, (France) Mathieu Decottignies-Lafon

== Results in major championships ==
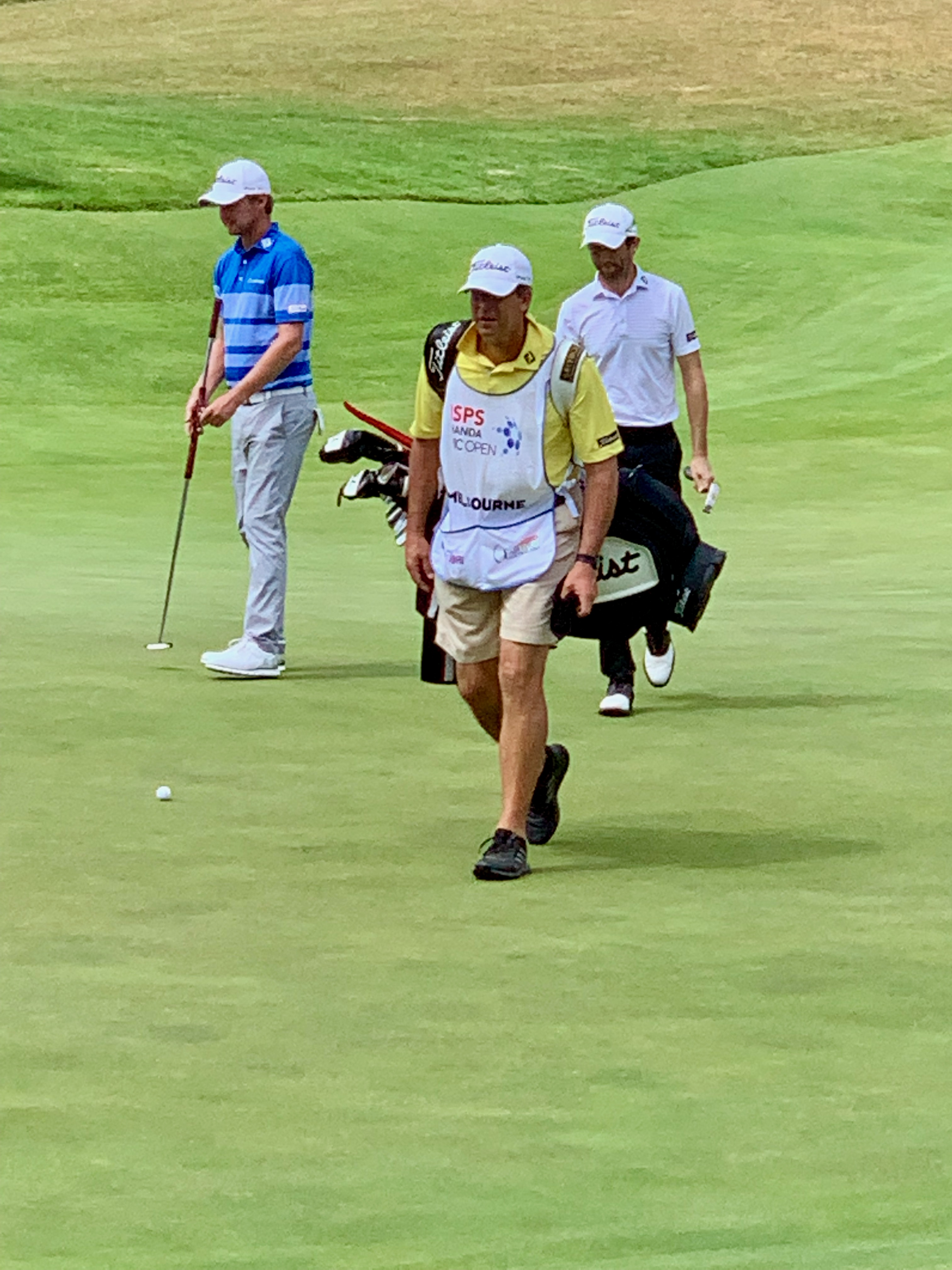
Harding and caddie Alan Burns at the ISPS Handa Vic Open at 13th Beach GC, Geelong, Victoria, Australia

Results not in chronological order in 2020.

Tournament	2013	2014	2015	2016	2017	2018
Masters Tournament						
U.S. Open						
The Open Championship	CUT					
PGA Championship						CUT

Tournament	2019	2020	2021	2022
Masters Tournament	T12	CUT		
PGA Championship	T54			T71
U.S. Open	CUT	CUT		
The Open Championship	T41	NT	T19	CUT

Did not play

CUT = missed the half-way cut
"T" = tied
NT = No tournament due to COVID-19 pandemic

== Results in World Golf Championships ==
Tournament	2018	2019	2020
Championship			T29
Match Play		T17	NT^{1}
Invitational		T43	
Champions	T46	T53	NT^{1}

^{1}Cancelled due to COVID-19 pandemic

Did not play

QF, R16, R32, R64 = Round in which player lost in match play
NT = No tournament
"T" = Tied

== See also ==
- 2024 European Tour Qualifying School graduates
