= Dimension Data Pro-Am =

Golf tournament

NTT Pro-Am
Tournament information
- Location: George, South Africa
- Established: 1996
- Courses: Fancourt Links (Montagu Course) (Outeniqua Course) (The Links)
- Par: 72 (M); 72 (O); 73 (L)
- Length: 7,342 yards (6,714 m) (M); 6,891 yards (6,301 m) (O); 7,388 yards (6,756 m) (L)
- Tours: European Tour; Sunshine Tour; Challenge Tour
- Format: Stroke play
- Prize fund: R 7,000,000
- Month played: February

Tournament record score
- Aggregate: 262 Wilco Nienaber (2025)
- To par: −27 as above

Current champion
- (South Africa) M. J. Daffue

Location map
- Location in South Africa Location in Western Cape

The Dimension Data Pro-Am, currently titled as the NTT Data Pro-Am, is an annual golf tournament which is played on the South African Sunshine Tour, founded in 1996. The tournament was co-sanctioned by the European Tour for the first two years. Since 2020, it has been co-sanctioned with the Challenge Tour and had increased prize money of US$340,000 (R 6,300,000). From 2011–2021, the winner received an entry into the WGC Invitational.

Until 2009 it was played at the Gary Player Country Club in Sun City, South Africa, with a prize fund in 2009 of R 1,800,000. The Lost City course was used during the early rounds. Since 2010 the tournament has been played at Fancourt in George in the Western Cape. It uses the Montagu and Outeniqua courses as well as The Links for the first three rounds, with the final round played on the Montagu course.

In 2025, the event was rebranded as the NTT Data Pro-Am due to Dimension Data being rebranded as NTT Data in April 2024.

== Winners ==
Year	Tour(s) (Note: AFR − Sunshine Tour; CHA − Challenge Tour; EUR − European Tour.)	Winner	Score	To par	Margin of victory	Runner(s)-up
NTT Data Pro-Am
2026	AFR, CHA	(South Africa) M. J. Daffue	200 (Note: Shortened to 54 holes due to weather.)	−16	4 strokes	(South Africa) Bryce Easton (Republic of Ireland) Max Kennedy (United States) Hunter Logan (Zimbabwe) Kieran Vincent
2025	AFR, CHA	(South Africa) Wilco Nienaber (2)	262	−27	7 strokes	(South Africa) Jean-Paul Strydom
Dimension Data Pro-Am
2024	AFR, CHA	(France) David Ravetto	274	−15	2 strokes	(England) Sam Hutsby
2023	AFR, CHA	(South Africa) Oliver Bekker (2)	267	−22	4 strokes	(Sweden) Adam Blommé
2022	AFR, CHA	(Germany) Alexander Knappe	266	−23	1 stroke	(South Africa) Dean Burmester
2021	AFR, CHA	(South Africa) Wilco Nienaber	269	−19	Playoff	(Sweden) Henric Sturehed
2020	AFR, CHA	(South Africa) Christiaan Bezuidenhout	264	−25	1 stroke	(South Africa) George Coetzee
2019	AFR	(Sweden) Philip Eriksson	268	−21	3 strokes	(South Africa) Justin Walters
2018	AFR	(South Africa) Jaco Ahlers	269	−20	3 strokes	(South Africa) Jean-Paul Strydom
2017	AFR	(Scotland) Paul Lawrie	274	−15	1 stroke	(United States) Justin Hicks (England) Chris Lloyd (South Africa) Chris Swanepoel
2016	AFR	(South Africa) George Coetzee	268	−21	1 stroke	(South Africa) Dean Burmester
2015	AFR	(South Africa) Branden Grace	278	−11	2 strokes	(South Africa) Keith Horne
2014	AFR	(Argentina) Estanislao Goya	275	−14	1 stroke	(Denmark) Lucas Bjerregaard (South Africa) Keith Horne (South Africa) Jean Hugo (Brazil) Adilson da Silva
2013	AFR	(South Africa) Jaco van Zyl	272	−17	1 stroke	(England) Daniel Brooks
2012	AFR	(South Africa) Oliver Bekker	276	−13	2 strokes	(South Africa) Thomas Aiken (South Africa) Tyrone Ferreira
2011	AFR	(South Africa) Hennie Otto	273	−16	4 strokes	(South Africa) James Kingston
2010	AFR	(South Africa) Darren Fichardt (2)	273	−16	1 stroke	(South Africa) Louis Oosthuizen
2009	AFR	(South Africa) Deane Pappas	268	−20	8 strokes	(South Africa) James Kamte
2008	AFR	(South Africa) James Kamte	277	−11	3 strokes	(South Africa) James Kingston
2007	AFR	(South Africa) Louis Oosthuizen	277	−11	1 stroke	(South Africa) Omar Sandys
2006	AFR	(Scotland) Alan McLean	285	−3	Playoff	(South Africa) Tyrone van Aswegen
2005	AFR	(England) Simon Wakefield	279	−9	3 strokes	(South Africa) Nic Henning
2004	AFR	(South Africa) Darren Fichardt	278	−10	2 strokes	(Zimbabwe) Nick Price (South Africa) Ulrich van den Berg
2003	AFR	(South Africa) Trevor Immelman	271	−17	1 stroke	(South Africa) Andrew McLardy (United States) Bruce Vaughan
2002	AFR	(South Africa) Retief Goosen	268	−20	3 strokes	(Scotland) Scott Drummond
2001	AFR	(Northern Ireland) Darren Clarke	274	−14	2 strokes	(South Africa) Tjaart van der Walt (South Africa) Retief Goosen
2000	AFR	(England) Lee Westwood	274	−14	5 strokes	(United States) Tom Gillis
1999	AFR	(United States) Scott Dunlap	273	−15	5 strokes	(South Africa) Steve van Vuuren
1998	AFR	(Zimbabwe) Nick Price (2)	276	−12	5 strokes	(Zimbabwe) Mark McNulty
1997	AFR, EUR	(Zimbabwe) Nick Price	268	−20	8 strokes	(South Africa) David Frost
1996	AFR, EUR	(Zimbabwe) Mark McNulty	282	−6	4 strokes	(South Africa) Brenden Pappas (Zimbabwe) Nick Price (England) Ricky Willison
