= Louis de Jager =

South African golfer

Personal information
- Nationality: South Africa
- Born: 30 March 1987 (age 39) Duiwelskloof, South Africa
- Height: 1.81 m (5 ft 11 in)
- Weight: 80 kg (180 lb; 13 st)

Career
- Sport: Golf
- Turned professional: 2008
- Current tours: Sunshine Tour; European Tour
- Professional wins: 8

Number of wins by tour
- Sunshine Tour: 5
- Other: 3

Louis de Jager (born 30 March 1987) is a professional golfer from South Africa playing on the Sunshine Tour.

== Early life and amateur career ==
De Jager was born in Duiwelskloof, Northern Transvaal. He won the South African Amateur in 2007 in both the stroke play and match play format. In 2007, de Jager also won the Gauteng North Etonic Open and the Boland Open.

== Professional career ==
In 2008, De Jager turned professional. He played his first full season on the Sunshine Tour that year. He played in 17 events and recorded five top-10 finishes. He won his first professional tournament in August 2009 at the Suncoast Classic.

== Amateur wins ==
- 2007 South African Amateur Stroke Play Championship, South African Amateur, Gauteng North Etonic Open, Boland Open

== Professional wins (8) ==
=== Sunshine Tour wins (5) ===
No.	Date	Tournament	Winning score	Margin of victory	Runner(s)-up
1	8 Aug 2009	Suncoast Classic	−9 (68-68-71=207)	2 strokes	(South Africa) Chris Swanepoel
2	5 Sep 2014	Vodacom Origins of Golf at Wild Coast Sun	−2 (63-68-77=208)	Playoff	(South Africa) Jaco Ahlers, (South Africa) Haydn Porteous
3	6 Nov 2014	Nedbank Affinity Cup	−12 (68-68-68=204)	Playoff	(South Africa) Vaughn Groenewald, (South Africa) Daniel van Tonder
4	26 Oct 2018	Sun Sibaya Challenge	−13 (68-64-65=197)	1 stroke	(South Africa) CJ du Plessis, (South Africa) Breyten Meyer
5	3 Feb 2019	Eye of Africa PGA Championship	−12 (68-70-67-71=276)	Playoff	(South Africa) Trevor Fisher Jnr

Sunshine Tour playoff record (3–0)

No.	Year	Tournament	Opponent(s)	Result
1	2014	Vodacom Origins of Golf at Wild Coast	(South Africa) Jaco Ahlers, (South Africa) Haydn Porteous	Won with par on first extra hole
2	2014	Nedbank Affinity Cup	(South Africa) Vaughn Groenewald, (South Africa) Daniel van Tonder	Won with birdie on second extra hole van Tonder eliminated by birdie on first hole
3	2019	Eye of Africa PGA Championship	(South Africa) Trevor Fisher Jnr	Won with par on first extra hole

=== IGT Pro Tour wins (3) ===
No.	Date	Tournament	Winning score	Margin of victory	Runner(s)-up
1	26 Mar 2014	IGT Series Silver Lakes Country Club	−15 (70-66-65=201)	6 strokes	(South Africa) CJ du Plessis
2	28 Jan 2016	Killarney Open	−10 (65-66-69=200)	3 strokes	(Sweden) Jonathan Ågren
3	14 Jun 2017	Centurion Challenge	−21 (68-64-63=195)	12 strokes	(South Africa) Dean Martin (a), (South Africa) Callum Mowat

== See also ==
- 2018 European Tour Qualifying School graduates
