= Vaughn Groenewald =

South African professional golfer (born 1974)

Personal information
- Nationality: South Africa
- Born: 28 December 1974 (age 51)
- Height: 6 ft 2 in (1.88 m)
- Weight: 160 lb (73 kg; 11 st)

Career
- Sport: Golf
- Turned professional: 1995
- Former tour: Sunshine Tour
- Professional wins: 6

Number of wins by tour
- Sunshine Tour: 6

Vaughn Groenewald (born 28 December 1974) is a South African professional golfer. He won the 2015 Zambia Sugar Open.

== Career ==
Groenewald played on the Sunshine Tour from 12995 to 2021. He won six times on tour, including the Zambia Sugar Open in 2015, the only one of his wins played over 72 holes.

== Professional wins (6) ==
=== Sunshine Tour wins (6) ===
No.	Date	Tournament	Winning score	Margin of victory	Runner(s)-up
1	26 May 2006	Vodacom Origins of Golf at Pretoria	−11 (69-65-71=205)	6 strokes	(South Africa) Thomas Aiken, (Scotland) Doug McGuigan
2	28 Oct 2006	Platinum Classic	−14 (68-66-68=202)	1 stroke	(South Africa) Thomas Aiken
3	3 May 2015	Zambia Sugar Open	−20 (68-65-71-68=272)	4 strokes	(South Africa) Jean Hugo
4	28 Aug 2015	Sun Wild Coast Sun Challenge	−12 (64-67-67=198)	1 stroke	(Zimbabwe) Mark Williams
5	20 Aug 2016	Vodacom Origins of Golf (2) at Arabella	−9 (68-73-66=207)	1 stroke	(Kenya) Stefan Engell Andersen
6	25 Aug 2018	Sun Wild Coast Sun Challenge (2)	−16 (67-61-66=194)	Playoff	(Brazil) Adilson da Silva, (South Africa) Hennie du Plessis, (South Africa) Darren Fichardt

Sunshine Tour playoff record (1–4)

No.	Year	Tournament	Opponent(s)	Result
1	2000	Lombard Tyres Classic	(South Africa) Brett Liddle	Lost to par on second extra hole
2	2012	Vodacom Origins of Golf at Simola	(Zimbabwe) Ryan Cairns	Lost to eagle on first extra hole
3	2014	Nedbank Affinity Cup	(South Africa) Louis de Jager, (South Africa) Daniel van Tonder	de Jager won with birdie on second extra hole van Tonder eliminated by birdie on first hole
4	2015	Vodacom Origins of Golf at Langebaan	(South Africa) Justin Harding	Lost to birdie on first extra hole
5	2018	Sun Wild Coast Sun Challenge	(Brazil) Adilson da Silva, (South Africa) Hennie du Plessis, (South Africa) Darren Fichardt	Won with birdie on first extra hole
