= Nedbank Affinity Cup =

Tournament information
- Location: Sun City, North West, South Africa
- Established: 2007
- Course: Lost City Golf Course
- Par: 72
- Length: 7,385 yards (6,753 m)
- Tour: Sunshine Tour
- Format: Stroke play
- Prize fund: R 800,000
- Month played: November
- Final year: 2015

Tournament record score
- Aggregate: 201 Jacques Blaauw (2013)
- To par: −15 as above

Final champion
- (South Africa) Ruan de Smidt

Location map
- Location in South Africa Location in North West

The Nedbank Affinity Cup was a golf tournament on the Sunshine Tour. It was founded in 2007 as a precursor to the Nedbank Golf Challenge, and is played at the Gary Player designed Lost City Golf Course, in Sun City, North West, South Africa.

== Winners ==
Year	Winner	Score	To par	Margin of victory	Runner(s)-up
2015	(South Africa) Ruan de Smidt	207	−9	Playoff	(South Africa) Andrew Curlewis
2014	(South Africa) Louis de Jager	204	−12	Playoff	(South Africa) Vaughn Groenewald (South Africa) Daniel van Tonder
2013	(South Africa) Jacques Blaauw	201	−15	1 stroke	(England) Steve Surry (South Africa) Ulrich van den Berg
2012	(South Africa) Trevor Fisher Jnr	207	−9	1 stroke	(South Africa) Desvonde Botes (South Africa) Bradford Vaughan
2011	(South Africa) Warren Abery	205	−11	2 strokes	(South Africa) Andrew Curlewis (South Africa) Prinavin Nelson
2010: No tournament
2009	(South Africa) Jake Roos	204	−12	Playoff	(South Africa) Mark Murless (South Africa) Albert Pistorius
2008	(South Africa) Tyrone van Aswegen	204	−12	1 stroke	(South Africa) Andrew Curlewis
2007	(South Africa) Mark Murless	202	−14	1 stroke	(Zimbabwe) Tongoona Charamba (South Africa) James Kingston
