= Tyrone van Aswegen =

South African golfer

Personal information
- Full name: Tyrone Frank van Aswegen
- Nationality: South Africa
- Born: 6 January 1982 (age 44) Johannesburg, South Africa
- Height: 6 ft 0 in (1.83 m)
- Weight: 170 lb (77 kg; 12 st)
- Spouse: Cristin

Career
- Sport: Golf
- College: Oklahoma City University
- Turned professional: 2004
- Former tours: PGA Tour; Sunshine Tour; Web.com Tour
- Professional wins: 2

Number of wins by tour
- Sunshine Tour: 2
- Other: 1

Tyrone Frank van Aswegen (born 6 January 1982) is a South African professional golfer who played on the PGA Tour.

Van Aswegen was born in Johannesburg, South Africa. He played in college at Oklahoma City University from 2000 to 2004, where he was a three-time NAIA All-American, led OCU to four NAIA team championships, and won seven times, including the 2002 individual national title.

Van Aswegen turned pro in 2004 after graduation, and began playing on the Sunshine Tour. He won twice on that tour in 2008, and finished a career-best seventh on the Order of Merit in 2009. He tied for 74th at the 2010 PGA Tour Qualifying Tournament, which gave him status for 2011 on the Web.com Tour (then known as the Nationwide Tour). After three seasons on the Web.com Tour, van Aswegen earned his PGA Tour card for the first time at the inaugural 2013 Web.com Tour Finals.

In his 2014 rookie season on the PGA Tour, van Aswegen finished 144th in the FedEx Cup and returned to the Web.com Tour Finals. He regained his card for 2015, but a poor season in which he finished 191st in the FedEx Cup necessitated another return to the Finals, through which he again regained his card.

His best finish on the PGA Tour was a T-3 at the 2015 Frys.com Open. His best finish on the Web.com Tour was a T-3 at the 2009 Soboba Classic.

Van Aswegen became a United States citizen in 2013.

== Professional wins (3) ==
=== Sunshine Tour wins (2) ===
No.	Date	Tournament	Winning score	Margin of victory	Runner(s)-up
1	25 Apr 2008	Vodacom Origins of Golf at Pretoria	−15 (67-69-65=201)	4 strokes	(South Africa) Darren Fichardt, (South Africa) Neil Schietekat
2	3 Dec 2008	Nedbank Affinity Cup	−12 (65-71-68=204)	1 stroke	(South Africa) Andrew Curlewis

Sunshine Tour playoff record (0–2)

No.	Year	Tournament	Opponent(s)	Result
1	2006	Dimension Data Pro-Am	(Scotland) Alan McLean	Lost to par on second extra hole
2	2012	Lion of Africa Cape Town Open	(South Africa) Jake Roos, (South Africa) Jaco van Zyl, (South Africa) Mark Williams	Roos won with birdie on second extra hole van Zyl eliminated by par on first hole

=== Other wins (1) ===
No.	Date	Tournament	Winning score	Margin of victory	Runner-up
1	2 Aug 2009	Long Beach Open	−27 (61-65-68-67=261)	7 strokes	(United States) Mike Ruiz

== See also ==
- 2013 Web.com Tour Finals graduates
- 2014 Web.com Tour Finals graduates
- 2015 Web.com Tour Finals graduates
