= Jake Roos =

South African professional golfer (born 1980)

Personal information
- Full name: Jakobus Roos
- Nationality: South Africa
- Born: 20 October 1980 (age 46) Pretoria, South Africa
- Height: 6 ft 2 in (1.88 m)
- Weight: 190 lb (86 kg; 14 st)
- Spouse: Rhoné
- Children: 2

Career
- Sport: Golf
- College: University of Stellenbosch
- Turned professional: 2005
- Current tour: Sunshine Tour
- Former tours: European Tour; Challenge Tour
- Professional wins: 16

Number of wins by tour
- Sunshine Tour: 6
- Challenge Tour: 2
- Other: 8

Jake Roos (born 20 October 1980) is a South African professional golfer.

== Early life and amateur career ==
In 1980, Roos was born in Pretoria. He was the # 1 ranked South African amateur golfer at the height of his amateur career.

== Professional career ==
In 2005, Ross turned professional. He joined the Sunshine Tour by finishing 4th at Q-school.

Roos' first victory on the Sunshine Tour came at the 2008 Suncoast Classic. His second victory came the following year at the Nedbank Affinity Cup. In 2012, Roos picked up his third victory on Tour at the Platinum Classic after he defeated Chris Swanepoel and Anthony Michael on the fifth hole of a sudden-death playoff. He picked up his second Sunshine Tour victory of the year in June at the Lombard Insurance Classic after defeating Justin Harding in a playoff. Roos entered the final round four shots back of Harding but fired a 63 (−9) to force a playoff. Roos would pick up his third victory of the 2012 season and fifth Sunshine Tour victory overall in November, when he won the Lion of Africa Cape Town Open in a four-man playoff with birdie on the second playoff hole. Roos would pick up his sixth overall Sunshine Tour victory in April 2013 when he won the Golden Pilsener Zimbabwe Open by a single stroke. Roos started the final round four shots back but fired a final round 67 to take the victory.

In March 2014, he won the Barclays Kenya Open and earned a place on the Challenge Tour for the rest of 2014. He would win a second Challenge Tour title at the Aegean Airlines Championship, Germany in July to secure his European Tour card for 2015.

Roos has also won six tournaments on the Golden State Tour, a mini tour in California.

== Professional wins (16) ==
=== Sunshine Tour wins (6) ===
No.	Date	Tournament	Winning score	Margin of victory	Runner(s)-up
1	13 Sep 2008	Suncoast Classic	−6 (68-68-74=210)	Playoff	(South Africa) Omar Sandys
2	2 Dec 2009	Nedbank Affinity Cup	−12 (71-66-67=204)	Playoff	(South Africa) Mark Murless, (South Africa) Albert Pistorius
3	24 Mar 2012	Platinum Classic	−14 (66-66-70=202)	Playoff	(South Africa) Anthony Michael, (South Africa) Chris Swanepoel
4	3 Jun 2012	Lombard Insurance Classic	−17 (66-70-63=199)	Playoff	(South Africa) Justin Harding
5	25 Nov 2012	Lion of Africa Cape Town Open	−9 (71-67-73-68=279)	Playoff	(South Africa) Tyrone van Aswegen, (South Africa) Jaco van Zyl, (South Africa) Mark Williams
6	21 Apr 2013	Golden Pilsener Zimbabwe Open	−14 (69-67-71-67=274)	1 stroke	(South Africa) Darren Fichardt, (Italy) Francesco Laporta

Sunshine Tour playoff record (5–5)

No.	Year	Tournament	Opponent(s)	Result
1	2008	Suncoast Classic	(South Africa) Omar Sandys	Won with birdie on third extra hole
2	2009	Nedbank Affinity Cup	(South Africa) Mark Murless, (South Africa) Albert Pistorius	
3	2012	Platinum Classic	(South Africa) Anthony Michael, (South Africa) Chris Swanepoel	Won with birdie on fifth extra hole
4	2012	Lombard Insurance Classic	(South Africa) Justin Harding	Won with par on first extra hole
5	2012	Lion of Africa Cape Town Open	(South Africa) Tyrone van Aswegen, (South Africa) Jaco van Zyl, (South Africa) Mark Williams	Won with birdie on second extra hole van Zyl eliminated by par on first hole
6	2014	Vodacom Origins of Golf at Vaal de Grace	(South Africa) PH McIntyre	Lost to birdie on third extra hole
7	2017	Sun City Challenge	(South Africa) Peter Karmis	Lost to par on first extra hole
8	2018	Lombard Insurance Classic	(South Africa) Justin Harding	Lost to birdie on sixth extra hole
9	2018	Vodacom Origins of Golf at Zebula	(South Africa) Zander Lombard	Lost to par on first extra hole
10	2021	Players Championship	(South Africa) Jaco Prinsloo, (South Africa) Daniel van Tonder	Prinsloo won with birdie on third extra hole Roos eliminated by eagle on first hole

=== Challenge Tour wins (2) ===
No.	Date	Tournament	Winning score	Margin of victory	Runner(s)-up
1	9 Mar 2014	Barclays Kenya Open	−10 (69-68-71-70=278)	1 stroke	(France) Adrien Bernadet, (Denmark) Lasse Jensen, (Spain) Pedro Oriol
2	6 Jul 2014	Aegean Airlines Challenge Tour	−13 (69-69-67-70=275)	2 strokes	(England) Jason Barnes

=== Other wins (8) ===
- 2010 Zurich Open
- 6 wins on the Golden State Tour
- 2015 Aegean Airlines Pro-am (Greece)

== See also ==
- 2014 Challenge Tour graduates
