= 2012 Sunshine Tour =

Golf tour season

2012 Sunshine Tour season
- Duration: 5 January 2012 – 16 December 2012
- Number of official events: 26
- Most wins: (South Africa) Jake Roos (3) (South Africa) Trevor Fisher Jnr (3)
- Order of Merit: (South Africa) Branden Grace
- Players' Player of the Year: (South Africa) Trevor Fisher Jnr
- Rookie of the Year: (South Africa) Daniel van Tonder

The 2012 Sunshine Tour was the 42nd season of the Sunshine Tour (formerly the Southern Africa Tour), the main professional golf tour in South Africa since it was formed in 1971.

== Schedule ==
The following table lists official events during the 2012 season.

Date	Tournament	Location	Purse (R)	Winner (Note: The number in brackets after each winner's name is the number of Sunshine Tour events they had won up to and including that tournament. This information is only shown for Sunshine Tour members.)	OWGR points	Other tours (Note: EUR − European Tour.)	Notes
8 Jan	Africa Open	Eastern Cape	€1,000,000	(South Africa) Louis Oosthuizen (7)	20	EUR	
15 Jan	Joburg Open	Gauteng	€1,300,000	(South Africa) Branden Grace (2)	22	EUR	
19 Feb	Dimension Data Pro-Am	Western Cape	3,200,000	(South Africa) Oliver Bekker (2)	14		Pro-Am
26 Feb	Telkom PGA Championship	Gauteng	3,500,000	(South Africa) Keith Horne (5)	14		
24 Mar	Platinum Classic	North West	500,000	(South Africa) Jake Roos (3)	4		
22 Apr	Golden Pilsener Zimbabwe Open	Zimbabwe	1,250,000	(South Africa) Chris Swanepoel (3)	6		
5 May	Investec Royal Swazi Open	Swaziland	1,000,000	(South Africa) Christiaan Basson (2)	6		
11 May	Vodacom Origins of Golf at Simola	Eastern Cape	600,000	(Zimbabwe) Ryan Cairns (1)	8		
26 May	Sun City Challenge	North West	550,000	(South Africa) Bryce Easton (1)	4		
3 Jun	Lombard Insurance Classic	Swaziland	900,000	(South Africa) Jake Roos (4)	4		
8 Jun	Vodacom Origins of Golf at Zebula	Limpopo	600,000	(South Africa) Bryce Easton (2)	4		
17 Jun	Indo Zambia Bank Zambia Open	Zambia	1,200,000	(South Africa) Justin Harding (3)	6		
27 Jul	Vodacom Origins of Golf at De Zalze	Western Cape	600,000	(South Africa) Allan Versfeld (1)	6		
24 Aug	Vodacom Origins of Golf at Selborne Park	KwaZulu-Natal	600,000	(Brazil) Adilson da Silva (10)	4		
31 Aug	Wild Waves Golf Challenge	KwaZulu-Natal	600,000	(South Africa) Trevor Fisher Jnr (5)	4		New tournament
7 Sep	Vodacom Origins of Golf at Sishen	Northern Cape	600,000	(South Africa) Trevor Fisher Jnr (6)	4		
28 Sep	Vodacom Origins of Golf Final	Western Cape	600,000	(South Africa) Branden Grace (3)	10		
21 Oct	BMG Classic	Gauteng	600,000	(South Africa) Teboho Sefatsa (1)	4		
27 Oct	Suncoast Classic	KwaZulu-Natal	600,000	(South Africa) Ruan de Smidt (1)	6		
4 Nov	ISPS Handa Match Play Championship	Gauteng	2,000,000	(Scotland) Doug McGuigan (6)	14		New tournament
8 Nov	Nedbank Affinity Cup	North West	650,000	(South Africa) Trevor Fisher Jnr (7)	4		
18 Nov	SA Open Championship	Gauteng	€1,000,000	(Sweden) Henrik Stenson (n/a)	32	EUR	Flagship event
25 Nov	Lion of Africa Cape Town Open	Western Cape	2,000,000	(South Africa) Jake Roos (5)	14		New tournament
2 Dec	Nedbank Golf Challenge	North West	US$5,000,000	(Germany) Martin Kaymer (n/a)	30		Limited-field event
9 Dec	Nelson Mandela Championship	KwaZulu-Natal	€1,300,000	(Scotland) Scott Jamieson (n/a)	20	EUR	New tournament
16 Dec	Alfred Dunhill Championship	Mpumalanga	€1,500,000	(South Africa) Charl Schwartzel (6)	28	EUR	

== Order of Merit ==
The Order of Merit was based on prize money won during the season, calculated in South African rand.

Position	Player	Prize money (R)
1	(South Africa) Branden Grace	2,760,319
2	(South Africa) George Coetzee	1,930,565
3	(South Africa) Jaco van Zyl	1,655,987
4	(South Africa) Trevor Fisher Jnr	1,502,093
5	(South Africa) Tjaart van der Walt	1,464,182

== Awards ==
Award	Winner	Ref.
Players' Player of the Year	(South Africa) Trevor Fisher Jnr	
Rookie of the Year (Bobby Locke Trophy)	(South Africa) Daniel van Tonder	

== See also ==
- 2012 Big Easy Tour
