= Ryan Cairns =

Zimbabwean professional golfer

Personal information
- Nationality: Zimbabwe
- Born: 12 February 1984 (age 42) Harare, Zimbabwe
- Height: 5 ft 10 in (1.78 m)
- Weight: 158 lb (72 kg; 11.3 st)

Career
- Sport: Golf
- Turned professional: 2005
- Current tour: Sunshine Tour
- Professional wins: 2

Number of wins by tour
- Sunshine Tour: 1
- Other: 1

Ryan Cairns (born 12 February 1984) is a Zimbabwean professional golfer who plays on the Sunshine Tour.

== Early life ==
Cairns was born in Harare, Zimbabwe.

== Professional career ==
In 2007, Cairns joined the Sunshine Tour. He won his first professional event on the Big Easy Tour, the Sunshine Tour's developmental tour, in March 2012. On 11 May 2012, he won the Vodacom Origins of Golf at Simola Golf and Country Estate on the Sunshine Tour. He secured the victory in a playoff over Vaughn Groenewald when he chipped in for an eagle.

Cairns played on the Canadian Tour in 2008.

== Amateur wins (3) ==
- 2002 African Junior Challenge, Mashonoland Amateur
- 2005 Southern Cape Closed Championship

== Professional wins (2) ==
=== Sunshine Tour wins (1) ===
No.	Date	Tournament	Winning score	Margin of victory	Runner-up
1	11 May 2012	Vodacom Origins of Golf at Simola	−15 (71-68-62=201)	Playoff	(South Africa) Vaughn Groenewald

Sunshine Tour playoff record (1–0)

No.	Year	Tournament	Opponent	Result
1	2012	Vodacom Origins of Golf at Simola	(South Africa) Vaughn Groenewald	Won with eagle on first extra hole

=== Big Easy Tour wins (1) ===
No.	Date	Tournament	Winning score	Margin of victory	Runner-up
1	28 Mar 2012	Observatory	−15 (63-66=129)	2 strokes	(England) Jeff Inglis
