= Brandon Stone =

South African professional golfer (born 1993)

Personal information
- Nationality: South Africa
- Born: 20 April 1993 (age 33) Rustenburg, South Africa
- Height: 1.80 m (5 ft 11 in)
- Weight: 65 kg (143 lb; 10.2 st)

Career
- Sport: Golf
- College: University of Texas
- Turned professional: 2013
- Current tours: European Tour; Sunshine Tour
- Former tour: Challenge Tour
- Professional wins: 5
- Highest ranking: 67 (12 February 2017)

Number of wins by tour
- European Tour: 3
- Sunshine Tour: 4
- Challenge Tour: 1

Best results in major championships
- Masters Tournament: DNP
- PGA Championship: T12: 2018
- U.S. Open: T35: 2017
- The Open Championship: T61: 2018

Achievements and awards
- Sunshine Tour Order of Merit winner: 2016–17

Brandon Stone (born 20 April 1993) is a South African professional golfer who plays on the European Tour and Sunshine Tour. He represented South Africa at the 2016 Summer Olympics.

== Amateur career ==
Stone won several amateur tournaments in South Africa and played on the 2012 South Africa Eisenhower Trophy team. He played one year of college golf at the University of Texas, winning three events, before turning professional in 2013.

== Professional career ==
In 2015, Stone played on the Sunshine Tour and Challenge Tour. He finished 14th on the Challenge Tour rankings, aided by second-place finishes at the Barclays Kenya Open and GANT Open and graduated to the European Tour. In November 2015, he earned his first professional win at the Sunshine Tour's Lion of Africa Cape Town Open.

In January 2016, making his second European Tour start as a full member, Stone won the South African Open by two strokes. The event was co-sanctioned with the Sunshine Tour.

In July 2017, Stone employed Alan Burns as his full time caddie commencing with The Open Championship. He had previously worked with Burns at the Alfred Dunhill Championship in December 2015.

He won the 2018 Aberdeen Standard Investments Scottish Open at Gullane with a final-round 60, tying the European Tour record, after narrowly missing a birdie putt on the final hole that would have given him a 59.

In April 2021, Stone won the Limpopo Championship after a four-man playoff, making a birdie at the first extra hole.

== Amateur wins ==
- 2010 Boland Open, Southern Cape Amateur
- 2011 Prince's Grant Invitational, North West Open, Limpopo Open, Ekurhuleni Open
- 2012 KwaZulu Natal Open, Prince's Grant Invitational, Sanlam Cape Province Open, Carpet Capital Collegiate
- 2013 Bayou City Collegiate, Big 12 Championship

== Professional wins (5) ==
=== European Tour wins (3) ===
Legend
Rolex Series (1)
Other European Tour (2)

No.	Date	Tournament	Winning score	Margin of victory	Runner-up
1	10 Jan 2016	BMW SA Open^{1}	−14 (71-67-65-71=274)	2 strokes	(South Africa) Christiaan Bezuidenhout
2	4 Dec 2016 (2017 season)	Alfred Dunhill Championship^{1}	−21 (67-66-66-68=267)	6 strokes	(South Africa) Richard Sterne
3	15 Jul 2018	Aberdeen Standard Investments Scottish Open	−20 (70-64-66-60=260)	4 strokes	(England) Eddie Pepperell

^{1}Co-sanctioned by the Sunshine Tour

European Tour playoff record (0–1)

No.	Year	Tournament	Opponent	Result
1	2020	Oman Open	(Finland) Sami Välimäki	Lost to par on third extra hole

=== Sunshine Tour wins (4) ===
Legend
Flagship events (2)
Other Sunshine Tour (2)

No.	Date	Tournament	Winning score	Margin of victory	Runner(s)-up
1	22 Nov 2015	Lion of Africa Cape Town Open	−16 (73-66-63-70=272)	5 strokes	(South Africa) Ockie Strydom
2	10 Jan 2016	BMW SA Open^{1}	−14 (71-67-65-71=274)	2 strokes	(South Africa) Christiaan Bezuidenhout
3	4 Dec 2016	Alfred Dunhill Championship^{1}	−21 (67-66-66-68=267)	6 strokes	(South Africa) Richard Sterne
4	25 Apr 2021	Limpopo Championship^{2}	−8 (72-69-69-70=280)	Playoff	(South Africa) Oliver Bekker, (South Africa) Hennie du Plessis, (South Africa) Daniel van Tonder

^{1}Co-sanctioned by the European Tour
^{2}Co-sanctioned by the Challenge Tour

Sunshine Tour playoff record (1–0)

No.	Year	Tournament	Opponents	Result
1	2021	Limpopo Championship	(South Africa) Oliver Bekker, (South Africa) Hennie du Plessis, (South Africa) Daniel van Tonder	Won with birdie on first extra hole

=== Challenge Tour wins (1) ===
No.	Date	Tournament	Winning score	Margin of victory	Runners-up
1	25 Apr 2021	Limpopo Championship^{1}	−8 (72-69-69-70=280)	Playoff	(South Africa) Oliver Bekker, (South Africa) Hennie du Plessis, (South Africa) Daniel van Tonder

^{1}Co-sanctioned by the Sunshine Tour

Challenge Tour playoff record (1–1)

No.	Year	Tournament	Opponent(s)	Result
1	2015	Barclays Kenya Open	(South Africa) Haydn Porteous	Lost to eagle on first extra hole
2	2021	Limpopo Championship	(South Africa) Oliver Bekker, (South Africa) Hennie du Plessis, (South Africa) Daniel van Tonder	Won with birdie on first extra hole

== Results in major championships ==
Results not in chronological order in 2020.

Tournament	2016	2017	2018
Masters Tournament			
U.S. Open		T35	
The Open Championship	CUT	T70	T61
PGA Championship	CUT	CUT	T12

Tournament	2019	2020	2021
Masters Tournament			
PGA Championship	CUT		CUT
U.S. Open			
The Open Championship	CUT	NT	

Did not play

CUT = missed the half-way cut
"T" = tied
NT = No tournament due to COVID-19 pandemic

== Results in World Golf Championships ==
Tournament	2017	2018	2019	2020	2021
Championship	T67	T60			T44
Match Play				NT^{1}	
Invitational		T53			
Champions	76	T46		NT^{1}	NT^{1}

^{1}Cancelled due to COVID-19 pandemic

Did not play

NT = No tournament
"T" = tied

== Team appearances ==
Amateur

- Eisenhower Trophy (representing South Africa): 2012

== See also ==
- 2015 Challenge Tour graduates
- 2023 Challenge Tour graduates
