= Trevor Fisher Jnr =

South African professional golfer

Personal information
- Full name: Trevor Henry Fisher Jnr
- Nationality: South Africa
- Born: 8 June 1979 (age 47) Johannesburg, South Africa
- Height: 1.78 m (5 ft 10 in)
- Weight: 85 kg (187 lb; 13.4 st)

Career
- Sport: Golf
- Turned professional: 2002
- Current tours: European Tour; Sunshine Tour
- Professional wins: 10

Number of wins by tour
- European Tour: 1
- Sunshine Tour: 9
- Other: 1

Achievements and awards
- Sunshine Tour Players' Player of the Year: 2012

Trevor Henry Fisher Jnr (born 8 June 1979) is a South African professional golfer who plays on the Sunshine Tour, where he is a nine-time winner.

== Career ==
In 1979, Fisher was born in Johannesburg, South Africa but currently resides in Modderfontein, in Johannesburg. He played the South African Open in 1999 and was the low amateur. He had won more than five amateur events when he turned professional in 2002, winning his first professional title the following year on the Sunshine Tour.

In March 2015, Fisher Jnr won the Africa Open, a co-sanctioned event on the Sunshine Tour and European Tour.

== Amateur highlights ==
- 1999 Modderfontein U23 (Captain)
- 2000 Modderfontein U23
- 2001 Kwazulu Natal Amateur, North West Amateur, Northern Province
- 2002 Champion of Champion

== Professional wins (10) ==
=== European Tour wins (1) ===
No.	Date	Tournament	Winning score	Margin of victory	Runner-up
1	8 Mar 2015	Africa Open^{1}	−24 (69-68-63-64=264)	5 strokes	(England) Matt Ford

^{1}Co-sanctioned by the Sunshine Tour

=== Sunshine Tour wins (9) ===
No.	Date	Tournament	Winning score	Margin of victory	Runner(s)-up
1	27 Mar 2003	FNB Botswana Open	−15 (67-68-66=201)	2 strokes	(South Africa) Des Terblanche
2	31 Aug 2006	Eskom Power Cup	−11 (66-67-69=202)	3 strokes	(South Africa) Thomas Aiken
3	2 Oct 2008	Seekers Travel Pro-Am	−10 (68-67-71=206)	Playoff	(South Africa) Desvonde Botes
4	3 Apr 2009	Vodacom Origins of Golf at Bloemfontein	−15 (69-67-65=201)	1 stroke	(South Africa) Jean Hugo, (South Africa) Willie van der Merwe
5	31 Aug 2012	Wild Waves Golf Challenge	−13 (64-67-66=197)	2 strokes	(South Africa) Ross Wellington
6	7 Sep 2012	Vodacom Origins of Golf (2) at Sishen	−14 (67-69-66=202)	Playoff	(South Africa) Christiaan Basson
7	8 Nov 2012	Nedbank Affinity Cup	−9 (69-67-71=207)	1 stroke	(South Africa) Desvonde Botes, (South Africa) Bradford Vaughan
8	23 Mar 2014	Investec Cup	−16 (69-70-67-66=272)	1 stroke	(South Africa) Jacques Blaauw
9	8 Mar 2015	Africa Open^{1}	−24 (69-68-63-64=264)	5 strokes	(England) Matt Ford

^{1}Co-sanctioned by the European Tour

Sunshine Tour playoff record (2–3)

No.	Year	Tournament	Opponent	Result
1	2008	Seekers Travel Pro-Am	(South Africa) Desvonde Botes	
2	2012	Golden Pilsener Zimbabwe Open	(South Africa) Chris Swanepoel	Lost to par on second extra hole
3	2012	Vodacom Origins of Golf at Sishen	(South Africa) Christiaan Basson	Won with birdie on first extra hole
4	2017	Zimbabwe Open	(South Africa) J. C. Ritchie	Lost to birdie on second extra hole
5	2019	Eye of Africa PGA Championship	(South Africa) Louis de Jager	Lost to par on first extra hole

=== Other wins (1) ===
- 2008 Klipdrift Premium Sun International Touring Pro-Am @ Sun City

== Results in World Golf Championships ==
Tournament	2015
Championship	
Match Play	
Invitational	
Champions	T58

Did not play

"T" = Tied
