= 2015 Sunshine Tour =

Golf tour season

2015 Sunshine Tour season
- Duration: 19 February 2015 – 6 December 2015
- Number of official events: 27
- Most wins: (South Africa) Dean Burmester (4)
- Order of Merit: (South Africa) George Coetzee
- Players' Player of the Year: (South Africa) Dean Burmester
- Rookie of the Year: (South Africa) Rourke van der Spuy

The 2015 Sunshine Tour was the 45th season of the Sunshine Tour (formerly the Southern Africa Tour), the main professional golf tour in South Africa since it was formed in 1971.

== Schedule ==
The following table lists official events during the 2015 season.

Date	Tournament	Location	Purse (R)	Winner (Note: The number in brackets after each winner's name is the number of Sunshine Tour events they had won up to and including that tournament. This information is only shown for Sunshine Tour members.)	OWGR points	Other tours (Note: ASA − Asian Tour; EUR − European Tour.)	Notes
22 Feb	Dimension Data Pro-Am	Western Cape	4,500,000	(South Africa) Branden Grace (5)	14		Pro-Am
1 Mar	Joburg Open	Gauteng	€1,300,000	(England) Andy Sullivan (n/a)	19	EUR	
8 Mar	Africa Open	Eastern Cape	14,500,000	(South Africa) Trevor Fisher Jnr (9)	19	EUR	
15 Mar	Tshwane Open	Gauteng	18,500,000	(South Africa) George Coetzee (6)	19	EUR	
22 Mar	Investec Cup	North West	1,000,000	(South Africa) Jaco Ahlers (3)	14		
12 Apr	Golden Pilsener Zimbabwe Open	Zimbabwe	1,800,000	(South Africa) Dean Burmester (3)	14		
26 Apr	Mopani/Redpath Zambia Open	Zambia	3,200,000	(England) Ross McGowan (1)	14		
3 May	Zambia Sugar Open	Zambia	1,500,000	(South Africa) Vaughn Groenewald (3)	14		
9 May	Investec Royal Swazi Open	Swaziland	1,200,000	(South Africa) PH McIntyre (2)	14		
10 May	AfrAsia Bank Mauritius Open	Mauritius	€1,000,000	(South Africa) George Coetzee (7)	17	ASA, EUR	New tournament
24 May	Lombard Insurance Classic	Swaziland	1,000,000	(South Africa) Dean Burmester (4)	7		
6 Jun	Vodacom Origins of Golf at Langebaan	Western Cape	650,000	(South Africa) Justin Harding (4)	4		
7 Aug	Sun City Challenge	North West	700,000	(South Africa) Keith Horne (8)	7		
22 Aug	Vodacom Origins of Golf at San Lameer	KwaZulu-Natal	650,000	(South Africa) Jean Hugo (16)	7		
28 Aug	Sun Wild Coast Sun Challenge	KwaZulu-Natal	700,000	(South Africa) Vaughn Groenewald (4)	7		New tournament
4 Sep	Sun Sibaya Challenge	KwaZulu-Natal	700,000	(South Africa) Michael Hollick (1)	4		New tournament
12 Sep	Vodacom Origins of Golf at Vaal de Grace	Free State	650,000	(South Africa) Jean Hugo (17)	7		
18 Sep	Sun Windmill Challenge	Free State	700,000	(South Africa) Dean Burmester (5)	7		
3 Oct	Vodacom Origins of Golf at St Francis	Eastern Cape	650,000	(South Africa) Christiaan Basson (4)	4		
9 Oct	Sun Boardwalk Challenge	Eastern Cape	700,000	(South Africa) Chris Swanepoel (4)	4		
16 Oct	Sun Fish River Sun Challenge	Eastern Cape	700,000	(South Africa) Rourke van der Spuy (1)	4		New tournament
24 Oct	Vodacom Origins of Golf at Koro Creek	Limpopo	650,000	(South Africa) Dean Burmester (6)	7		
5 Nov	Nedbank Affinity Cup	North West	800,000	(South Africa) Ruan de Smidt (2)	4		
13 Nov	Vodacom Origins of Golf Final	Limpopo	650,000	(South Africa) Darren Fichardt (14)	4		
22 Nov	Lion of Africa Cape Town Open	Western Cape	1,200,000	(South Africa) Brandon Stone (1)	14		
29 Nov	Alfred Dunhill Championship	Mpumalanga	€1,500,000	(South Africa) Charl Schwartzel (8)	22	EUR	
6 Dec	Nedbank Golf Challenge	Gauteng	US$6,500,000	(Australia) Marc Leishman (n/a)	44	EUR	Limited-field event

== Order of Merit ==
The Order of Merit was based on prize money won during the season, calculated in South African rand.

Position	Player	Prize money (R)
1	(South Africa) George Coetzee	5,470,684
2	(South Africa) Charl Schwartzel	3,302,972
3	(South Africa) Jacques Blaauw	3,080,301
4	(South Africa) Dean Burmester	2,810,226
5	(South Africa) Trevor Fisher Jnr	2,560,306

== Awards ==
Award	Winner	Ref.
Players' Player of the Year	(South Africa) Dean Burmester	
Rookie of the Year (Bobby Locke Trophy)	(South Africa) Rourke van der Spuy	

== See also ==
- 2015 Big Easy Tour
