= Daniel van Tonder =

South African professional golfer (born 1991)

Personal information
- Nationality: South Africa
- Born: 12 March 1991 (age 35) Soweto, South Africa
- Height: 5 ft 10 in (1.78 m)
- Spouse: Abigail van Tonder

Career
- Sport: Golf
- Turned professional: 2011
- Current tours: Sunshine Tour; European Tour
- Former tour: Challenge Tour
- Professional wins: 15
- Highest ranking: 71 (16 January 2022) (as of 25 October 2026)

Number of wins by tour
- European Tour: 1
- Sunshine Tour: 13
- Challenge Tour: 2
- Other: 1

Best results in major championships
- Masters Tournament: DNP
- PGA Championship: T44: 2021
- U.S. Open: DNP
- The Open Championship: T40: 2021

Achievements and awards
- Sunshine Tour Rookie of the Year: 2012
- Sunshine Tour Order of Merit winner: 2024–25

Daniel van Tonder (born 12 March 1991) is a South African professional golfer who plays on the Challenge Tour and the Sunshine Tour.

== Professional career ==
Van Tonder turned professional in 2011 and played on the Sunshine Tour. He has won 12 times on the tour, with his first two coming in 2014; the Investec Royal Swazi Open and the Vodacom Origins of Golf at Euphoria. He also won the Mopani Redpath Greendoor Logistics Zambia Open in 2019. In 2020, he won four tournaments on the Sunshine Tour in the space of three months.

In March 2021, van Tonder claimed his first European Tour victory at the Kenya Savannah Classic. He defeated Jazz Janewattananond with a tap-in birdie on the third playoff hole. The following month he lost in a four-man playoff for the Limpopo Championship. In December 2021, van Tonder won the SA Open Championship; the Sunshine Tour's flagship event. He shot a final-round 65 to win by one shot ahead of Oliver Bekker.

At the beginning of 2025, van Tonder won the opening two events on the Challenge Tour season, both being co-sanctioned with the Sunshine Tour. Heading into the third tournament of the season; the Cell C Cape Town Open, van Tonder was aiming to become the first player in history to win three consecutive Challenge Tour events and earn automatic promotion to the European Tour. He eventually finished tied-sixth. In March, he secured the Sunshine Tour Order of Merit for the 2024–25 season. Van Tonder finished the Challenge Tour season in ninth place on the rankings, gaining status to play on the 2026 European Tour.

== Personal life ==
Van Tonder is married to Abigail who also has also acted as his caddie.

== Professional wins (15) ==
=== European Tour wins (1) ===
No.	Date	Tournament	Winning score	Margin of victory	Runner-up
1	26 Mar 2021	Kenya Savannah Classic	−21 (65-64-70-64=263)	Playoff	(Thailand) Jazz Janewattananond

European Tour playoff record (1–0)

No.	Year	Tournament	Opponent	Result
1	2021	Kenya Savannah Classic	(Thailand) Jazz Janewattananond	Won with birdie on third extra hole

=== Sunshine Tour wins (13) ===
Legend
Flagship events (1)
Playoff events (1)
Other Sunshine Tour (11)

No.	Date	Tournament	Winning score	Margin of victory	Runner(s)-up
1	10 May 2014	Investec Royal Swazi Open	48 pts (4-12-14-18=48)	Playoff	(South Africa) Jacques Blaauw, (South Africa) Jared Harvey
2	27 Jun 2014	Vodacom Origins of Golf at Euphoria	−12 (67-67-70=204)	1 stroke	(South Africa) Tyrone Ferreira
3	31 Mar 2019	Mopani Redpath Greendoor Logistics Zambia Open	−5 (72-73-68-70=283)	1 stroke	(South Africa) Callum Mowat
4	28 Aug 2020	African Bank Sunshine Tour Championship	−11 (67-70-68=205)	3 strokes	(South Africa) George Coetzee, (Brazil) Adilson da Silva, (South Africa) Neil Schietekat
5	25 Sep 2020	Vodacom Championship Unlocked	−13 (66-70-67=203)	1 stroke	(South Africa) M. J. Viljoen
6	2 Oct 2020	Vodacom Championship Reloaded	−21 (63-66-66=195)	4 strokes	(South Africa) Jaco Ahlers, (Brazil) Adilson da Silva
7	31 Oct 2020	Investec Royal Swazi Open (2)	48 pts (15-12-11-10=48)	18 points	(South Africa) Neil Schietekat
8	5 Dec 2021	SA Open Championship	−16 (69-68-70-65=272)	1 stroke	(South Africa) Oliver Bekker
9	3 Aug 2024	FNB Eswatini Challenge	−14 (68-66-68=202)	2 strokes	(South Africa) Yurav Premlall
10	30 Aug 2024	Gary & Vivienne Player Challenge	−14 (70-66-66=202)	Playoff	(South Africa) Yurav Premlall, (South Africa) Martin Rohwer
11	26 Jan 2025	SDC Open^{1}	−16 (72-65-68-67=272)	Playoff	(South Africa) Altin van der Merwe
12	2 Feb 2025	MyGolfLife Open^{1}	−27 (62-66-66-67=261)	2 strokes	(South Africa) Martin Vorster
13	15 Mar 2026	Serengeti Playoffs	−21 (70-63-71-63=267)	2 strokes	(Germany) Allen John, (South Africa) Wilco Nienaber

^{1}Co-sanctioned by the Challenge Tour

Sunshine Tour playoff record (3–3)

No.	Year	Tournament	Opponent(s)	Result
1	2014	Investec Royal Swazi Open	(South Africa) Jacques Blaauw, (South Africa) Jared Harvey	Won with birdie on first extra hole
2	2014	Nedbank Affinity Cup	(South Africa) Louis de Jager, (South Africa) Vaughn Groenewald	de Jager won with birdie on second extra hole van Tonder eliminated by birdie on first hole
3	2021	Players Championship	(South Africa) Jaco Prinsloo, (South Africa) Jake Roos	Prinsloo won with birdie on third extra hole Roos eliminated by eagle on first hole
4	2021	Limpopo Championship	(South Africa) Oliver Bekker, (South Africa) Hennie du Plessis, (South Africa) Brandon Stone	Stone won with birdie on first extra hole
5	2024	Gary & Vivienne Player Challenge	(South Africa) Yurav Premlall, (South Africa) Martin Rohwer	Won with par on fourth extra hole Premlall eliminated by birdie on second hole
6	2025	SDC Open	(South Africa) Altin van der Merwe	Won with par on first extra hole

=== Challenge Tour wins (2) ===
No.	Date	Tournament	Winning score	Margin of victory	Runner-up
1	26 Jan 2025	SDC Open^{1}	−16 (72-65-68-67=272)	Playoff	(South Africa) Altin van der Merwe
2	2 Feb 2025	MyGolfLife Open^{1}	−27 (62-66-66-67=261)	2 strokes	(South Africa) Martin Vorster

^{1}Co-sanctioned by the Sunshine Tour

Challenge Tour playoff record (1–1)

No.	Year	Tournament	Opponent(s)	Result
1	2021	Limpopo Championship	(South Africa) Oliver Bekker, (South Africa) Hennie du Plessis, (South Africa) Brandon Stone	Stone won with birdie on first extra hole
2	2025	SDC Open	(South Africa) Altin van der Merwe	Won with par on first extra hole

=== IGT Pro Tour wins (1) ===
No.	Date	Tournament	Winning score	Margin of victory	Runner-up
1	9 Mar 2016	Houghton Open	−22 (65-64-65=194)	9 strokes	(United States) Zachary Portemont

== Results in major championships ==
Tournament	2021	2022	2023	2024	2025
Masters Tournament					
PGA Championship	T44	CUT			CUT
U.S. Open					
The Open Championship	T40				CUT

Did not play

CUT = missed the half-way cut
"T" = tied

== Results in World Golf Championships ==
Tournament	2015	2016	2017	2018	2019	2020	2021
Championship	T66						71
Match Play						NT^{1}	
Invitational							
Champions	T72					NT^{1}	NT^{1}

^{1}Cancelled due to COVID-19 pandemic

Did not play

NT = No tournament
"T" = Tied

== See also ==
- 2025 Challenge Tour graduates
