= Kenya Savannah Classic =

Professional golf tournament

Coordinates: 1.3412°S 36.7152°E

Tournament information
- Location: Nairobi, Kenya
- Established: 2021
- Course: Karen Country Club
- Par: 71
- Length: 6,922 yards (6,329 m)
- Tour: European Tour
- Format: Stroke play
- Prize fund: €1,000,000
- Month played: March
- Final year: 2021

Tournament record score
- Aggregate: 263 Jazz Janewattananond (2021); 263 Daniel van Tonder (2021)
- To par: −21 as above

Final champion
- (South Africa) Daniel van Tonder

Location map
- Location in Kenya

The Kenya Savannah Classic was a professional golf tournament that was held 23–26 March 2021 at Karen Country Club in Nairobi, Kenya. The principal sponsor was Absa Bank Limited.

The tournament was intended to be a one-off event and created a two-week "Kenyan swing" with the Magical Kenya Open being played at the same location the prior week.

Daniel van Tonder won the event, defeating Jazz Janewattananond in a playoff to claim his first European Tour victory.

== Winners ==
Year	Winner	Score	To par	Margin of victory	Runner-up
2021	(South Africa) Daniel van Tonder	263	−21	Playoff	(Thailand) Jazz Janewattananond
