= 2011 Sunshine Tour =

Golf tour season

2011 Sunshine Tour season
- Duration: 6 January 2011 – 4 December 2011
- Number of official events: 29
- Most wins: (South Africa) Jean Hugo (3) (South Africa) Hennie Otto (3)
- Order of Merit: (South Africa) Garth Mulroy
- Players' Player of the Year: (South Africa) Jean Hugo
- Rookie of the Year: (South Africa) Allan Versfeld

The 2011 Sunshine Tour was the 41st season of the Sunshine Tour (formerly the Southern Africa Tour), the main professional golf tour in South Africa since it was formed in 1971.

== OWGR points adjustment ==
In July, the Official World Golf Ranking announced that the "Winter Series" events would be awarded points at the minimum level of 4 points for the winner of a 54-hole event.

== Schedule ==
The following table lists official events during the 2011 season.

Date	Tournament	Location	Purse (R)	Winner (Note: The number in brackets after each winner's name is the number of Sunshine Tour events they had won up to and including that tournament. This information is only shown for Sunshine Tour members.)	OWGR points	Other tours (Note: EUR − European Tour.)	Notes
9 Jan	Africa Open	Eastern Cape	€1,000,000	(South Africa) Louis Oosthuizen (6)	22	EUR	
16 Jan	Joburg Open	Gauteng	€1,300,000	(South Africa) Charl Schwartzel (5)	20	EUR	
30 Jan	Africom Zimbabwe Open	Zimbabwe	1,250,000	(South Africa) Theunis Spangenberg (1)	14		
20 Feb	Dimension Data Pro-Am	Western Cape	3,000,000	(South Africa) Hennie Otto (10)	14		Pro-Am
27 Feb	Telkom PGA Championship	Gauteng	3,250,000	(South Africa) George Coetzee (4)	14		
20 Mar	MTC Namibia PGA Championship	Namibia	1,200,000	(South Africa) J. G. Claassen (1)	14		
7 May	Investec Royal Swazi Open	Swaziland	750,000	(South Africa) Justin Walters (2)	14		
14 May	Nashua Golf Challenge	North West	500,000	(Brazil) Adilson da Silva (8)	n/a		
27 May	Vodacom Origins of Golf at Pretoria	Gauteng	540,000	(South Africa) Jean Hugo (11)	n/a		
5 Jun	Lombard Insurance Classic	Swaziland	850,000	(South Africa) Justin Harding (2)	n/a		
10 Jun	Vodacom Origins of Golf at Arabella	Western Cape	540,000	(South Africa) Chris Swanepoel (2)	n/a		
29 Jul	Vodacom Origins of Golf at Simola	Eastern Cape	540,000	(South Africa) Jean Hugo (12)	n/a		
12 Aug	Vodacom Origins of Golf at Wild Coast Sun	KwaZulu-Natal	540,000	(South Africa) Darren Fichardt (11)	n/a		
2 Sep	Vodacom Origins of Golf at Sishen	Northern Cape	540,000	(Brazil) Adilson da Silva (9)	n/a		
9 Sep	Telkom PGA Pro-Am	Gauteng	500,000	(South Africa) Jaco van Zyl (10)	n/a		
17 Sep	Northern Cape Classic	Northern Cape	600,000	(South Africa) Oliver Bekker (1)	n/a		New tournament
23 Sep	Vodacom Origins of Golf Final	Limpopo	600,000	(South Africa) Jean Hugo (13)	n/a		
8 Oct	Platinum Classic	North West	500,000	(South Africa) Hennie Otto (11)	n/a		
15 Oct	KCM Zambia Open	Zambia	1,200,000	(Scotland) Doug McGuigan (5)	14		
22 Oct	Suncoast Classic	KwaZulu-Natal	500,000	(South Africa) Darren Fichardt (12)	n/a		
30 Oct	BMG Classic	Gauteng	600,000	(South Africa) James Kamte (4)	n/a		
6 Nov	Nashua Masters	Eastern Cape	1,200,000	(South Africa) Shaun Norris (2)	14		
10 Nov	Nedbank Affinity Cup	North West	600,000	(South Africa) Warren Abery (8)	n/a		
20 Nov	Alfred Dunhill Championship	Mpumalanga	€1,000,000	(South Africa) Garth Mulroy (3)	20	EUR	
27 Nov	SA Open Championship	Gauteng	€1,000,000	(South Africa) Hennie Otto (12)	32	EUR	Flagship event
4 Dec	Nedbank Golf Challenge	North West	US$5,000,000	(England) Lee Westwood (n/a)	38		Limited-field event

== Order of Merit ==
The Order of Merit was based on prize money won during the season, calculated in South African rand.

Position	Player	Prize money (R)
1	(South Africa) Garth Mulroy	3,464,463
2	(South Africa) Hennie Otto	2,806,214
3	(South Africa) George Coetzee	1,586,587
4	(South Africa) Thomas Aiken	1,569,896
5	(South Africa) Jaco van Zyl	1,231,134

== Awards ==
Award	Winner	Ref.
Players' Player of the Year	(South Africa) Jean Hugo	
Rookie of the Year (Bobby Locke Trophy)	(South Africa) Allan Versfeld	

== See also ==
- 2011 Big Easy Tour
