= 2008 Sunshine Tour =

Golf tour season

2008 Sunshine Tour season
- Duration: 10 January 2008 – 21 December 2008
- Number of official events: 30
- Most wins: (South Africa) Richard Sterne (3)
- Order of Merit: (South Africa) Richard Sterne
- Rookie of the Year: (South Africa) Louis Moolman

The 2008 Sunshine Tour was the 38th season of the Sunshine Tour (formerly the Southern Africa Tour), the main professional golf tour in South Africa since it was formed in 1971.

== Schedule ==
The following table lists official events during the 2008 season.

Date	Tournament	Location	Purse (R)	Winner (Note: The number in brackets after each winner's name is the number of Sunshine Tour events they had won up to and including that tournament. This information is only shown for Sunshine Tour members.)	OWGR points	Other tours (Note: ANZ − PGA Tour of Australasia; ASA − Asian Tour; EUR − European Tour.)	Notes
13 Jan	Joburg Open	Gauteng	€1,100,000	(South Africa) Richard Sterne (3)	20	EUR	
27 Jan	Dimension Data Pro-Am	North West	1,800,000	(South Africa) James Kamte (2)	14		Pro-Am
3 Feb	Nashua Masters	Eastern Cape	1,200,000	(Zimbabwe) Marc Cayeux (9)	14		
10 Feb	Africa Open	Eastern Cape	1,200,000	(South Africa) Shaun Norris (1)	14		New tournament
17 Feb	Vodacom Championship	Gauteng	2,400,000	(South Africa) James Kingston (8)	14		
24 Feb	Telkom PGA Championship	Gauteng	2,500,000	(South Africa) Louis Oosthuizen (5)	14		
2 Mar	Mount Edgecombe Trophy	KwaZulu-Natal	500,000	(South Africa) Mark Murless (4)	n/a		
30 Mar	Chainama Hills Zambia Open	Zambia	750,000	(South Africa) Tyrone Ferreira (1)	n/a		
4 Apr	Vodacom Origins of Golf at Bloemfontein	Free State	440,000	(South Africa) Dion Fourie (2)	n/a		
25 Apr	Vodacom Origins of Golf at Pretoria	Gauteng	440,000	(South Africa) Tyrone van Aswegen (1)	n/a		
10 May	Samsung Royal Swazi Sun Open	Swaziland	700,000	(South Africa) Jean Hugo (6)	n/a		
17 May	Nashua Golf Challenge	North West	500,000	(South Africa) Keith Horne (3)	n/a		
30 May	Vodacom Origins of Golf at Selborne	KwaZulu-Natal	440,000	(South Africa) Jean Hugo (7)	n/a		
8 Jun	Lombard Insurance Classic	Swaziland	400,000	(South Africa) Merrick Bremner (1)	n/a		
23 Aug	SAA Pro-Am Invitational	Western Cape	500,000	(South Africa) George Coetzee (2)	n/a		
29 Aug	Vodacom Origins of Golf at Arabella	Western Cape	440,000	(South Africa) Garth Mulroy (1)	n/a		
5 Sep	Telkom PGA Pro-Am	Gauteng	400,000	(South Africa) Merrick Bremner (2)	n/a		
13 Sep	Suncoast Classic	KwaZulu-Natal	500,000	(South Africa) Jake Roos (1)	n/a		
19 Sep	Vodacom Origins of Golf at Humewood	Eastern Cape	440,000	(South Africa) George Coetzee (3)	n/a		
4 Oct	Seekers Travel Pro-Am	Gauteng	440,000	(South Africa) Trevor Fisher Jnr (3)	n/a		
12 Oct	BMG Classic	Gauteng	500,000	(Scotland) Doug McGuigan (3)	n/a		New tournament
19 Oct	Metmar Highveld Classic	Mpumalanga	600,000	(South Africa) James Kamte (3)	n/a		
24 Oct	Vodacom Origins of Golf Final	Western Cape	440,000	(South Africa) Jaco van Zyl (2)	n/a		
1 Nov	Platinum Classic	North West	705,000	(South Africa) Thomas Aiken (7)	n/a		
9 Nov	MTC Namibia PGA Championship	Namibia	1,000,000	(Zimbabwe) Tongoona Charamba (2)	n/a		
27 Nov	Coca-Cola Charity Championship	Western Cape	550,000	(South Africa) Garth Mulroy (2)	n/a		
3 Dec	Nedbank Affinity Cup	North West	550,000	(South Africa) Tyrone van Aswegen (2)	n/a		
7 Dec	Nedbank Golf Challenge	North West	US$4,385,000	(Sweden) Henrik Stenson (n/a)	34		Limited-field event
14 Dec	Alfred Dunhill Championship	Mpumalanga	€1,000,000	(South Africa) Richard Sterne (4)	24	EUR	
21 Dec	South African Open Championship	Western Cape	€1,000,000	(South Africa) Richard Sterne (5)	40	EUR	Flagship event

=== Unofficial events ===
The following events were sanctioned by the Sunshine Tour, but did not carry official money, nor were wins official.

Date	Tournament	Location	Purse (R)	Winner	OWGR points	Other tours	Notes
9 Nov	HSBC Champions	China	US$5,000,000	(Spain) Sergio García	52	ANZ, (Note: PGA Tour of Australasia unofficial event) ASA, (Note: Asian Tour unofficial event) EUR	Limited-field event

== Order of Merit ==
The Order of Merit was based on prize money won during the season, calculated in South African rand.

Position	Player	Prize money (R)
1	(South Africa) Richard Sterne	5,999,265
2	(South Africa) Garth Mulroy	1,442,351
3	(South Africa) Thomas Aiken	967,378
4	(South Africa) Mark Murless	885,056
5	(South Africa) James Kingston	775,903

== Awards ==
Award	Winner	Ref.
Rookie of the Year (Bobby Locke Trophy)	(South Africa) Louis Moolman	
