= Nedbank Champions Challenge =

Tournament information
- Location: Sun City, South Africa
- Established: 2010
- Course(s): Gary Player CC
- Format: Stroke play
- Final year: 2012

Final champion
- (Germany) Bernhard Langer

The Nedbank Champions Challenge was a men's senior (over 50) professional golf tournament played from 2010 to 2012. The event featured an invited field of 8. Two rounds were played in 2010, increasing to three rounds in 2011 and 2012. It was held concurrently with the Nedbank Golf Challenge.

== Winners ==
Year	Winner	Country	Score	To par	Margin of victory	Runner(s)-up
Nedbank Champions Challenge
2012	Bernhard Langer	Germany	209	−7	2 strokes	(United States) Jay Haas
Nedbank Senior Challenge
2011	Mark Calcavecchia	United States	207	−9	1 stroke	(Germany) Bernhard Langer (Wales) Ian Woosnam
2010	Jeff Sluman	United States	138	−6	2 strokes	(United States) Tommy Armour III
