= George Coetzee =

South African professional golfer

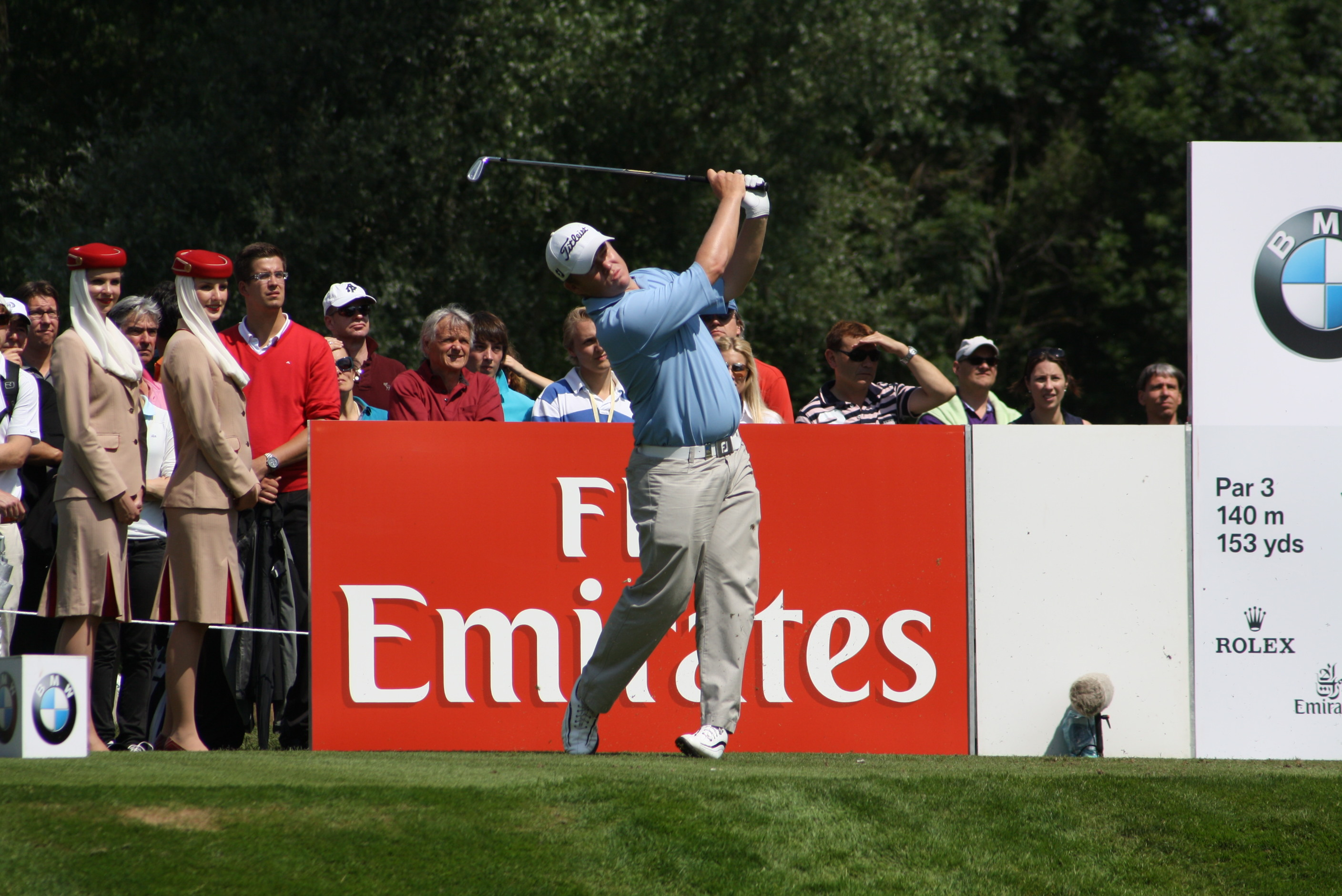
- Coetzee at the 2011 BMW International Open

Personal information
- Full name: George William Coetzee
- Nationality: South Africa
- Born: 18 July 1986 (age 40) Pretoria, South Africa
- Height: 1.78 m (5 ft 10 in)
- Weight: 95 kg (209 lb; 15.0 st)

Career
- Sport: Golf
- Turned professional: 2007
- Current tour: Sunshine Tour
- Former tours: European Tour; Canadian Tour
- Professional wins: 17
- Highest ranking: 41 (27 January 2013)

Number of wins by tour
- European Tour: 5
- Asian Tour: 1
- Sunshine Tour: 15
- Other: 1

Best results in major championships
- Masters Tournament: CUT: 2013
- PGA Championship: T7: 2015
- U.S. Open: T56: 2013
- The Open Championship: 15th: 2011

Achievements and awards
- Sunshine Tour Order of Merit winner: 2015, 2017–18

George William Coetzee (born 18 July 1986) is a South African professional golfer. He has won five tournaments on the European Tour and 14 on the Sunshine Tour, where he has also topped the Order of Merit on two occasions.

== Early life ==
Coetzee was born in Pretoria and matriculated from the Afrikaanse Hoër Seunskool in 2004. He started playing golf when he was 10 and won the first junior tournament he ever played in, shooting 49 in 9 holes. He finished 4th and 8th in the Callaway Junior World Championship in San Diego, where he attended the University of San Diego for one semester. He turned professional in 2007.

== Professional career ==
Having turned professional, Coetzee joined the Sunshine Tour in 2007. He claimed his first win during his rookie season, in the Vodacom Origins of Golf Tour event at Selborne. His second and third wins came a year later at the SAA Pro-Am Invitational, and the Vodacom Origins of Golf Tour event at Humewood.

He earned a European Tour card for the 2010 season through the qualifying school, but had to return to qualifying school at the end of the season after finishing 126th on the Order of Merit and recording only two top-10 finishes. Coetzee regained his playing rights in 2011. He had a runner-up placing at the Johnnie Walker Championship at Gleneagles, where he lost out to Thomas Bjorn on the fifth extra hole of a five-man playoff. He also had three third-place finishes at other tournaments and eight top-10s overall. Coetzee finished the season ranked 26th on the Race to Dubai. The following season, 2012, he finished 21st on the Race to Dubai and reached the top 50 of the Official World Golf Ranking.

In February 2014, Coetzee won his maiden European Tour title in his 107th start with a three stroke victory at the Joburg Open. He came from four strokes behind in the final round with a six under par 66 to claim victory. Coetzee won his second European Tour title at the Tshwane Open in March 2015, by a single stroke over Jacques Blaauw. In May 2015, Coetzee won his second tournament of the year at the inaugural AfrAsia Bank Mauritius Open, defeating Thorbjørn Olesen in a sudden-death playoff, at the second extra hole with a birdie on the par-five 18th hole. He won the Sunshine Tour Order of Merit that season.

In February 2016, Coetzee won the Dimension Data Pro-Am finishing birdie-birdie-eagle to defeat Dean Burmester by a single stroke. In July 2017, Alan Burns, who had been Coetzee's caddie since 2010, took another opportunity with another South African golfer Brandon Stone. Coetzee won his second Sunshine Tour Order of Merit title in 2017–18; during the season he won the co-sanctioned Tshwane Open, his fourth European Tour victory.

In September 2020, Coetzee won his fifth tournament on the European Tour at the Portugal Masters. This was his first win in mainland Europe and his first European Tour win that was not co-sanctioned by the Sunshine Tour.

== Amateur wins ==
- 2006 Northern Amateur Open

== Professional wins (17) ==
=== European Tour wins (5) ===
| No. | Date | Tournament | Winning score | To par | Margin of victory | Runner(s)-up |
|---|---|---|---|---|---|---|
| 1 | 9 Feb 2014 | Joburg Open^{1} | 65-68-69-66=268 | −19 | 3 strokes | (England) Tyrrell Hatton, (South Korea) Jin Jeong, (South Africa) Justin Walters |
| 2 | 15 Mar 2015 | Tshwane Open^{1} | 67-66-68-65=266 | −14 | 1 stroke | (South Africa) Jacques Blaauw |
| 3 | 10 May 2015 | AfrAsia Bank Mauritius Open^{1,2} | 70-67-65-69=271 | −13 | Playoff | (Denmark) Thorbjørn Olesen |
| 4 | 4 Mar 2018 | Tshwane Open^{1} (2) | 67-64-68-67=266 | −18 | 2 strokes | (England) Sam Horsfield |
| 5 | 13 Sep 2020 | Portugal Masters | 66-70-66-66=268 | −16 | 2 strokes | (England) Laurie Canter |

^{1}Co-sanctioned by the Sunshine Tour
^{2}Co-sanctioned by the Asian Tour

European Tour playoff record (1–1)

| No. | Year | Tournament | Opponent(s) | Result |
|---|---|---|---|---|
| 1 | 2011 | Johnnie Walker Championship at Gleneagles | (Denmark) Thomas Bjørn, (England) Mark Foster, (Spain) Pablo Larrazábal, (Austria) Bernd Wiesberger | Bjørn won with birdie on fifth extra hole Foster eliminated by par on fourth hole Larrazábal eliminated by par on second hole Wiesberger eliminated by par on first hole |
| 2 | 2015 | AfrAsia Bank Mauritius Open | (Denmark) Thorbjørn Olesen | Won with birdie on second extra hole |

=== Sunshine Tour wins (15) ===
Legend
Playoff events (1)
Other Sunshine Tour (14)

| No. | Date | Tournament | Winning score | To par | Margin of victory | Runner(s)-up |
|---|---|---|---|---|---|---|
| 1 | 15 Jun 2007 | Vodacom Origins of Golf at Selborne | 70-71-66=207 | −9 | 2 strokes | (South Africa) Ulrich van den Berg |
| 2 | 23 Aug 2008 | SAA Pro-Am Invitational | 72-66-69=207 | −9 | 3 strokes | (South Africa) Warren Abery, (Scotland) Doug McGuigan |
| 3 | 19 Sep 2008 | Vodacom Origins of Golf (2) at Humewood | 71-68-73=212 | −4 | 1 stroke | (South Africa) Jean Hugo |
| 4 | 27 Feb 2011 | Telkom PGA Championship | 65-64-68-64=261 | −27 | 2 strokes | (South Africa) Neil Schietekat |
| 5 | 9 Feb 2014 | Joburg Open^{1} | 65-68-69-66=268 | −19 | 3 strokes | (England) Tyrrell Hatton, (South Korea) Jin Jeong, (South Africa) Justin Walters |
| 6 | 15 Mar 2015 | Tshwane Open^{1} | 67-66-68-65=266 | −14 | 1 stroke | (South Africa) Jacques Blaauw |
| 7 | 10 May 2015 | AfrAsia Bank Mauritius Open^{1,2} | 70-67-65-69=271 | −13 | Playoff | (Denmark) Thorbjørn Olesen |
| 8 | 21 Feb 2016 | Dimension Data Pro-Am | 68-70-64-66=268 | −21 | 1 stroke | (South Africa) Dean Burmester |
| 9 | 4 Mar 2018 | Tshwane Open^{1} (2) | 67-64-68-67=266 | −18 | 2 strokes | (England) Sam Horsfield |
| 10 | 2 Nov 2019 | Vodacom Origins of Golf Final (3) | 61-69-66=196 | −20 | 3 strokes | (South Africa) M. J. Viljoen |
| 11 | 4 Sep 2020 | Titleist Championship | 67-70-66=203 | −13 | 4 strokes | (South Africa) Tristen Strydom |
| 12 | 6 Aug 2021 | Vodacom Origins of Golf (4) at De Zalze | 63-66-69=198 | −18 | 3 strokes | (South Africa) Jaco Ahlers, (South Africa) Tristen Strydom |
| 13 | 6 Aug 2022 | Vodacom Origins of Golf (5) at De Zalze | 61-67-67=195 | −21 | 2 strokes | (England) Joe Long |
| 14 | 6 Nov 2022 | PGA Championship (2) | 67-71-67-68=273 | −15 | 3 strokes | (South Africa) Casey Jarvis |
| 15 | 23 Mar 2025 | Serengeti Playoffs | 65-66-69-69=269 | −19 | 3 strokes | (South Africa) Daniel van Tonder |

^{1}Co-sanctioned by the European Tour
^{2}Co-sanctioned by the Asian Tour

Sunshine Tour playoff record (1–1)

| No. | Year | Tournament | Opponent | Result |
|---|---|---|---|---|
| 1 | 2015 | AfrAsia Bank Mauritius Open | (Denmark) Thorbjørn Olesen | Won with birdie on second extra hole |
| 2 | 2025 | Vodacom Origins of Golf at Devonvale | (South Africa) Jacques Kruyswijk | Lost to par on second extra hole |

=== Other wins (1) ===
| No. | Date | Tournament | Winning score | To par | Margin of victory | Runners-up |
|---|---|---|---|---|---|---|
| 1 | 13 Nov 2011 | Gary Player Invitational (with (England) Mark James) | 64-61=125 | −19 | 4 strokes | (South Africa) Jaco van Zyl and (Wales) Ian Woosnam |

== Results in major championships ==
Results not in chronological order in 2020.

| Tournament | 2011 | 2012 | 2013 | 2014 | 2015 | 2016 | 2017 | 2018 |
|---|---|---|---|---|---|---|---|---|
| Masters Tournament | | | CUT | | | | | |
| U.S. Open | | CUT | T56 | | T70 | | CUT | |
| The Open Championship | 15 | CUT | T71 | 18 | CUT | CUT | | CUT |
| PGA Championship | | CUT | CUT | CUT | T7 | T60 | | |

| Tournament | 2019 | 2020 | 2021 |
|---|---|---|---|
| Masters Tournament | | | |
| PGA Championship | | | CUT |
| U.S. Open | | | |
| The Open Championship | | NT | |

Top 10
Did not play

CUT = missed the half-way cut
"T" = tied
NT = No tournament due to COVID-19 pandemic

=== Summary ===
| Tournament | Wins | 2nd | 3rd | Top-5 | Top-10 | Top-25 | Events | Cuts made |
|---|---|---|---|---|---|---|---|---|
| Masters Tournament | 0 | 0 | 0 | 0 | 0 | 0 | 1 | 0 |
| PGA Championship | 0 | 0 | 0 | 0 | 1 | 1 | 6 | 2 |
| U.S. Open | 0 | 0 | 0 | 0 | 0 | 0 | 4 | 2 |
| The Open Championship | 0 | 0 | 0 | 0 | 0 | 2 | 7 | 3 |
| Totals | 0 | 0 | 0 | 0 | 1 | 3 | 18 | 7 |

- Most consecutive cuts made – 2 (2013 U.S. Open – 2013 Open Championship)
- Longest streak of top-10s – 1

== Results in World Golf Championships ==
Results not in chronological order prior to 2015.

| Tournament | 2012 | 2013 | 2014 | 2015 | 2016 | 2017 | 2018 | 2019 |
|---|---|---|---|---|---|---|---|---|
| Championship | | T53 | T16 | | 57 | | | T56 |
| Match Play | R64 | R64 | R16 | T17 | | | | |
| Invitational | | | | | T21 | | | |
| Champions | T56 | 74 | T12 | | T40 | | T50 | |

Top 10
Did not play

QF, R16, R32, R64 = Round in which player lost in match play
"T" = tied

== Team appearances ==
Professional

- World Cup (representing South Africa): 2013, 2016

== See also ==
- 2009 European Tour Qualifying School graduates
- 2010 European Tour Qualifying School graduates
- List of male golfers
