= Alfred Dunhill Championship =

Golf tournament held in South Africa

Tournament information
- Location: Johannesburg, Gauteng, South Africa
- Established: 2000
- Courses: Royal Johannesburg Golf Club (East Course)
- Par: 72
- Length: 7,656 yards (7,001 m)
- Tours: European Tour; Sunshine Tour
- Format: Stroke play
- Prize fund: €1,500,000
- Month played: December

Tournament record score
- Aggregate: 264 Charl Schwartzel (2012)
- To par: −24 as above

Current champion
- (South Africa) Jayden Schaper

Final champion
- Location in South Africa Location in Gauteng

The Alfred Dunhill Championship is a men's professional golf tournament which is played in South Africa. It is part of the Southern African Sunshine Tour and is one of several events in South Africa that are co-sanctioned by the more prestigious European Tour.

== History ==
The tournament was founded in 2000, but its origins lie in Dunhill's sponsorship of the South African PGA Championship between 1995 and 1999. Following the 1999 Alfred Dunhill PGA Championship, the company decided to discontinue their association with the South African PGA, and create their own stand alone tournament. The first event was held in January 2000 at the Houghton Golf Club in Johannesburg, and replaced the South African PGA Championship on the European Tour calendar.

In 2004, the tournament was rescheduled to December, resulting in two events being staged that year; one in January and one in December. Following this change, the Alfred Dunhill Championship has formed part of the following year's European Tour season. In addition, the event was moved to the Leopard Creek Country Club, just south of the Kruger National Park in Malalane, Mpumalanga.

The 2021 event was scheduled to take place at Leopard Creek Country Club from 9–12 December. It was to be a co-sanctioned event between the European Tour and the Sunshine Tour. However, due to COVID-19 travel restrictions in place in the UK from South Africa, the event was cancelled less than two weeks before the tournament was due to start.

== Flagship event ==
In 2016, the Alfred Dunhill Championship replaced the South African Open as the tour's flagship event by the Official World Golf Ranking governing board. The winner was awarded 32 OWGR points. The change only lasted for one edition before reverting to the South African Open the following year as no tournament was held. In 2020, the Alfred Dunhill Championship once again became the tour's flagship event. The event was intended to be the flagship event again in 2021. However, due to the cancellation of the tournament, the flagship event status was passed onto the South African Open.

== Winners ==
Sunshine Tour (Flagship event)	2016, 2020
Sunshine Tour (Regular)	2000–2015, 2017–2018, 2022–

#	Year	Tours (Note: AFR − Sunshine Tour; EUR − European Tour.)	Winner	Score	To par	Margin of victory	Runner(s)-up	Venue
Alfred Dunhill Championship
25th	2025	AFR, EUR	(South Africa) Jayden Schaper	198 (Note: Shortened to 54 holes due to weather.)	−16	Playoff	(South Africa) Shaun Norris	Royal Johannesburg
24th	2024	AFR, EUR	(South Africa) Shaun Norris	275	−13	1 stroke	(Sweden) Marcus Kinhult (England) John Parry (South Africa) Ryan van Velzen	Leopard Creek
23rd	2023	AFR, EUR	(South Africa) Louis Oosthuizen	270	−18	2 strokes	(South Africa) Charl Schwartzel	Leopard Creek
22nd	2022	AFR, EUR	(South Africa) Ockie Strydom	270	−18	2 strokes	(Spain) Adrián Otaegui	Leopard Creek
–	2021	AFR, EUR	Cancelled due to the effect of COVID-19 related travel restrictions					
21st	2020	AFR, EUR	(South Africa) Christiaan Bezuidenhout	274	−14	4 strokes	(England) Richard Bland (United States) Sean Crocker (Poland) Adrian Meronk (South Africa) Jayden Schaper	Leopard Creek
20th	2019	AFR, EUR	(Spain) Pablo Larrazábal	280	−8	1 stroke	(Sweden) Joel Sjöholm	Leopard Creek
19th	2018	AFR, EUR	(United States) David Lipsky	274	−14	2 strokes	(Scotland) David Drysdale	Leopard Creek
2017: No tournament due to course renovation
18th	2016	AFR, EUR	(South Africa) Brandon Stone	267	−21	6 strokes	(South Africa) Richard Sterne	Leopard Creek
17th	2015	AFR, EUR	(South Africa) Charl Schwartzel (4)	273	−15	4 strokes	(France) Grégory Bourdy	Leopard Creek
16th	2014	AFR, EUR	(South Africa) Branden Grace	268	−20	7 strokes	(South Africa) Louis Oosthuizen	Leopard Creek
15th	2013	AFR, EUR	(South Africa) Charl Schwartzel (3)	271	−17	4 strokes	(England) Richard Finch	Leopard Creek
14th	2012	AFR, EUR	(South Africa) Charl Schwartzel (2)	264	−24	12 strokes	(Sweden) Kristoffer Broberg	Leopard Creek
13th	2011	AFR, EUR	(South Africa) Garth Mulroy	269	−19	2 strokes	(Scotland) George Murray	Leopard Creek
12th	2010	AFR, EUR	(Spain) Pablo Martín (2)	277	−11	2 strokes	(South Africa) Anthony Michael (Denmark) Thorbjørn Olesen (South Africa) Charl Schwartzel	Leopard Creek
11th	2009	AFR, EUR	(Spain) Pablo Martín	271	−17	1 stroke	(South Africa) Charl Schwartzel	Leopard Creek
10th	2008	AFR, EUR	(South Africa) Richard Sterne	271	−17	1 stroke	(Sweden) Johan Edfors (England) Robert Rock	Leopard Creek
9th	2007	AFR, EUR	(England) John Bickerton	275	−13	1 stroke	(South Africa) Ernie Els (England) Lee Slattery	Leopard Creek
8th	2006	AFR, EUR	(Spain) Álvaro Quirós	275	−13	1 stroke	(South Africa) Charl Schwartzel	Leopard Creek
Dunhill Championship
7th	2005	AFR, EUR	(South Africa) Ernie Els	274	−14	3 strokes	(South Africa) Louis Oosthuizen (South Africa) Charl Schwartzel	Leopard Creek
6th	2004 (Dec)	AFR, EUR	(South Africa) Charl Schwartzel	281	−7	Playoff	(England) Neil Cheetham	Houghton
5th	2004 (Jan)	AFR, EUR	(Germany) Marcel Siem	266	−22	Playoff	(France) Grégory Havret (France) Raphaël Jacquelin	Houghton
4th	2003	AFR, EUR	(England) Mark Foster	273	−15	Playoff	(Denmark) Anders Hansen (South Africa) Trevor Immelman (Scotland) Paul Lawrie (Scotland) Doug McGuigan (South Africa) Bradford Vaughan	Houghton
3rd	2002	AFR, EUR	(England) Justin Rose	268	−20	2 strokes	(England) Mark Foster (South Africa) Retief Goosen (South Africa) Martin Maritz	Houghton
Alfred Dunhill Championship
2nd	2001	AFR, EUR	(Australia) Adam Scott	267	−21	1 stroke	(England) Justin Rose	Houghton
1st	2000	AFR, EUR	(England) Anthony Wall	204	−12	2 strokes	(Scotland) Gary Orr (Wales) Phillip Price	Houghton
