= Richard Sterne (golfer) =

South African professional golfer (born 1981)

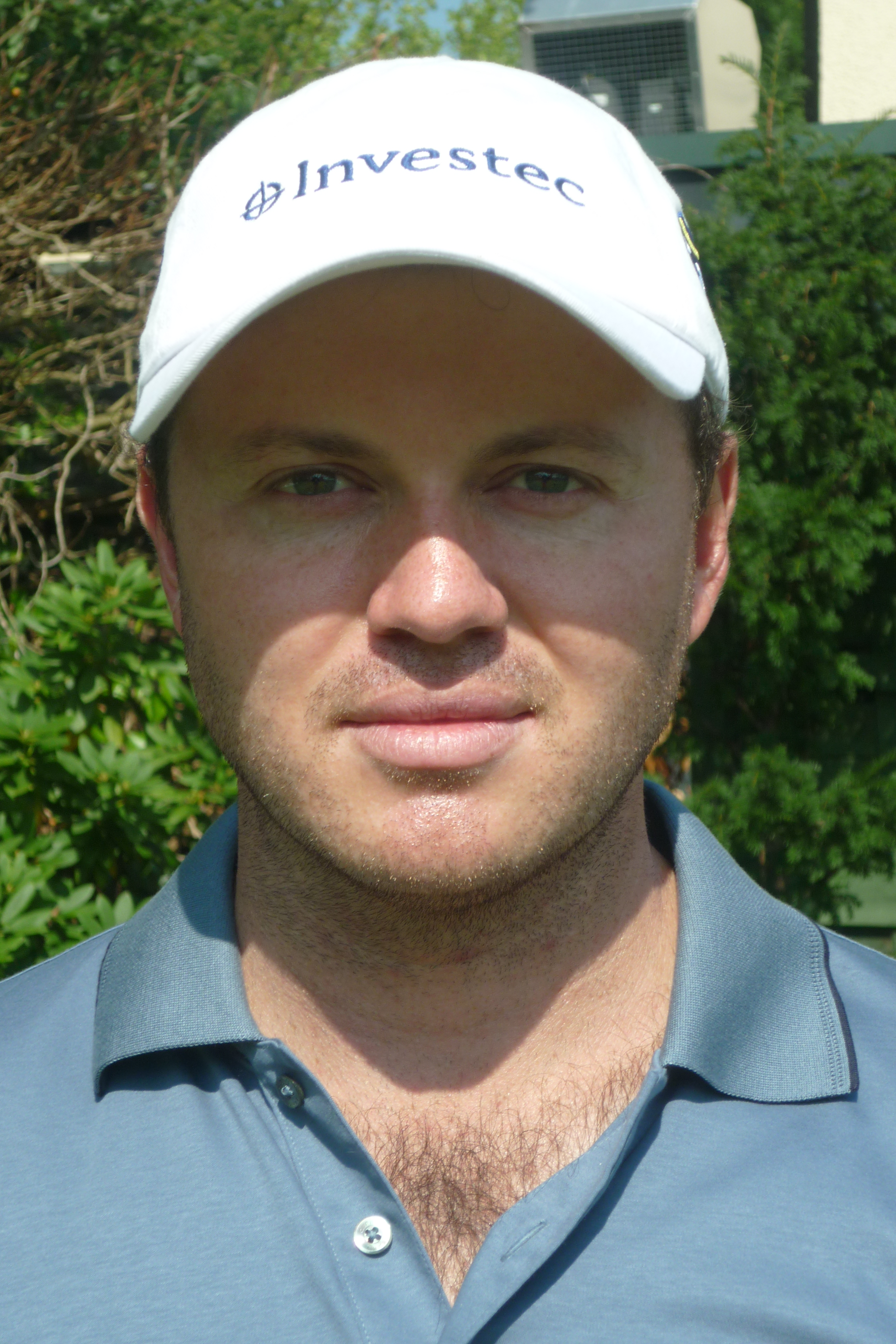

Personal information
- Nationality: South Africa
- Born: 27 August 1981 (age 45) Pretoria, South Africa
- Height: 1.70 m (5 ft 7 in)
- Weight: 68 kg (150 lb; 10.7 st)

Career
- Sport: Golf
- Turned professional: 2001
- Current tours: European Tour; Sunshine Tour
- Former tour: PGA Tour
- Professional wins: 10
- Highest ranking: 29 (27 January 2008)

Number of wins by tour
- European Tour: 7
- Sunshine Tour: 6

Best results in major championships
- Masters Tournament: T25: 2008, 2013
- PGA Championship: T28: 2017
- U.S. Open: CUT: 2008
- The Open Championship: T21: 2013

Achievements and awards
- Sunshine Tour Order of Merit winner: 2008

Richard Sterne (born 27 August 1981) is a South African professional golfer who plays on both the European and Sunshine Tours.

== Early life ==
In 1981, Sterne was born in Pretoria. He attended St Alban's College for secondary school. Sterne was runner-up in the Boys' 15–17 Division at the 1999 World Junior Golf Championships. That year he also won the South African Amateur.

== Professional career ==
In 2001, Sterne turned pro. He played on the European Challenge Tour in 2002 and graduated to membership of the main European Tour in 2003. Sterne won his first European Tour title at the 2004 Open de Madrid.

In the 2007 European Tour, Sterne won at the Celtic Manor Wales Open, and finished second at the Johnnie Walker Classic, third at the BMW PGA Championship and fourth at the Barclays Scottish Open, therefore finishing 14th in the Order of Merit. In 2008 he picked up his third victory at the Joburg Open which is co-sanctioned by the Sunshine Tour, and at the end of 2008 won a further two European Tour tournaments in South Africa.

His best year-end ranking on the European Order of Merit is 8th in 2013. His Celtic Manor win moved him into the top 40 of the Official World Golf Ranking for the first time.

He has had six wins on the Sunshine Tour, and won that tour's Order of Merit in 2008. In January 2008 he reached a career high of number 29 in the Official World Golf Ranking. He missed most of the 2010 and 2011 seasons with injury.

In February 2013, Sterne won the Joburg Open by seven strokes, to end a four-year winless drought from which he had been plagued with back injuries. This marked his sixth victory on both the European and Sunshine Tours and came on the back of a second-place finish he had in the previous week at the Dubai Desert Classic. It was also the first event that he had won wire-to-wire. The win moved him inside the top 60, which meant qualification for the WGC-Accenture Match Play Championship and to the top of the Race to Dubai standings. Later he finished second at the Alstom Open de France, ninth at the WGC-Bridgestone Invitational, 13th at the Omega European Masters, and 14th at the DP World Tour Championship, Dubai. As a result, he was eighth in the Race to Dubai final standings.

During the 2014 season, Sterne finished fourth at the WGC-Cadillac Championship, 17th at the WGC-Accenture Match Play Championship and 35th at the PGA Championship. He qualified to the Web.com Tour Finals, where he ended second at the Nationwide Children's Hospital Championship. He finished ninth in the Web.com Tour Finals to earn his PGA Tour card for the 2014–15 season.

Sterne is friends with South African golf icon, Gary Player, to whom he is often compared because of their similar small stature. He has played several times in the Gary Player Invitational charity event to help raise funds for less fortunate children's education.

== Amateur wins ==
- 1999 South African Junior Strokeplay & Matchplay Championship, South African Amateur
- 2000 Southern Cross
- 2001 South African Amateur Strokeplay Championship

== Professional wins (10) ==
=== European Tour wins (7) ===
No.	Date	Tournament	Winning score	Margin of victory	Runner(s)-up
1	24 Oct 2004	Open de Madrid	−18 (70-65-66-65=266)	2 strokes	(Denmark) Anders Hansen
2	3 Jun 2007	Celtic Manor Wales Open	−13 (67-67-64-65=263)	1 stroke	(Wales) Bradley Dredge, (Denmark) Søren Kjeldsen, (Singapore) Mardan Mamat, (Denmark) Mads Vibe-Hastrup
3	13 Jan 2008	Joburg Open^{1}	−13 (71-68-67-65=271)	Playoff	(Sweden) Magnus A. Carlsson, (South Africa) Garth Mulroy
4	14 Dec 2008 (2009 season)	Alfred Dunhill Championship^{1}	−17 (68-66-68-69=271)	1 stroke	(Sweden) Johan Edfors, (England) Robert Rock
5	21 Dec 2008 (2009 season)	South African Open Championship^{1}	−14 (72-69-67-66=274)	Playoff	(Northern Ireland) Gareth Maybin
6	10 Feb 2013	Joburg Open^{1} (2)	−27 (63-65-68-64=260)	7 strokes	(South Africa) Charl Schwartzel
7	24 May 2026	Soudal Open	−18 (64-68-68-66=266)	2 strokes	(England) Marcus Armitage, (Spain) Jorge Campillo, (Japan) Kota Kaneko, (Sweden) Marcus Kinhult, (Denmark) Jacob Skov Olesen, (France) Victor Perez

^{1}Co-sanctioned by the Sunshine Tour

European Tour playoff record (2–1)

No.	Year	Tournament	Opponent(s)	Result
1	2007	Johnnie Walker Classic	(South Africa) Anton Haig, (England) Oliver Wilson	Haig won with birdie on first extra hole
2	2008	Joburg Open	(Sweden) Magnus A. Carlsson, (South Africa) Garth Mulroy	Won with birdie on second extra hole
3	2008	South African Open Championship	(Northern Ireland) Gareth Maybin	Won with birdie on first extra hole

=== Sunshine Tour wins (6) ===
Legend
Flagship events (1)
Other Sunshine Tour (5)

No.	Date	Tournament	Winning score	Margin of victory	Runner(s)-up
1	5 Feb 2005	Nashua Masters	−11 (68-64-67-70=269)	1 stroke	(South Africa) Titch Moore, (South Africa) Grant Muller
2	18 Feb 2007	Vodacom Championship	−14 (73-68-68-65=274)	Playoff	(South Africa) Louis Oosthuizen
3	13 Jan 2008	Joburg Open^{1}	−13 (71-68-67-65=271)	Playoff	(Sweden) Magnus A. Carlsson, (South Africa) Garth Mulroy
4	14 Dec 2008	Alfred Dunhill Championship^{1}	−17 (68-66-68-69=271)	1 stroke	(Sweden) Johan Edfors, (England) Robert Rock
5	21 Dec 2008	South African Open Championship^{1}	−14 (72-69-67-66=274)	Playoff	(Northern Ireland) Gareth Maybin
6	10 Feb 2013	Joburg Open^{1} (2)	−27 (63-65-68-64=260)	7 strokes	(South Africa) Charl Schwartzel

^{1}Co-sanctioned by the European Tour

Sunshine Tour playoff record (3–0)

No.	Year	Tournament	Opponent(s)	Result
1	2007	Vodacom Championship	(South Africa) Louis Oosthuizen	Won with birdie on second extra hole
2	2008	Joburg Open	(Sweden) Magnus A. Carlsson, (South Africa) Garth Mulroy	Won with birdie on second extra hole
3	2008	South African Open Championship	(Northern Ireland) Gareth Maybin	Won with birdie on first extra hole

=== EuroPro Tour wins (1) ===
No.	Date	Tournament	Winning score	Margin of victory	Runner-up
1	14 Sep 2001	Rye Hill Championship	−7 (209)	1 stroke	(England) Martin LeMesurier

== Playoff record ==
Web.com Tour playoff record (0–1)

No.	Year	Tournament	Opponent	Result
1	2014	Nationwide Children's Hospital Championship	(United States) Justin Thomas	Lost to birdie on first extra hole

== Results in major championships ==
Tournament	2006	2007	2008	2009
Masters Tournament			T25	CUT
U.S. Open			CUT	
The Open Championship	CUT	CUT	CUT	T34
PGA Championship		WD		WD

Tournament	2010	2011	2012	2013	2014	2015	2016	2017	2018
Masters Tournament				T25					
U.S. Open									
The Open Championship			T39	T21	CUT		T46		
PGA Championship				CUT	T35			T28	

Tournament	2019
Masters Tournament	
PGA Championship	CUT
U.S. Open	
The Open Championship	CUT

Did not play

CUT = missed the half-way cut
WD = withdrew
"T" = tied for place

=== Summary ===
Tournament	Wins	2nd	3rd	Top-5	Top-10	Top-25	Events	Cuts made
Masters Tournament	0	0	0	0	0	2	3	2
PGA Championship	0	0	0	0	0	0	6	2
U.S. Open	0	0	0	0	0	0	1	0
The Open Championship	0	0	0	0	0	1	9	4
Totals	0	0	0	0	0	3	19	8

- Most consecutive cuts made – 3 (twice)
- Longest streak of top-10s – 0

== Results in The Players Championship ==
Tournament	2008
The Players Championship	T66

"T" indicates a tie for a place

== Results in World Golf Championships ==
Results not in chronological order before 2015.

Tournament	2007	2008	2009	2010	2011	2012	2013	2014	2015	2016	2017	2018	2019
Championship		T44	73				T12	T4			T72		T51
Match Play		R64	R64				R32	R32					
Invitational	T51		73				T9	T58					
Champions			T60				T39			T60	T38		T70

Top 10
Did not play

QF, R16, R32, R64 = Round in which player lost in match play
"T" = tied
Note that the HSBC Champions did not become a WGC event until 2009.

== Team appearances ==
Professional

- World Cup (representing South Africa): 2006, 2008, 2009
- Presidents Cup (representing the International team): 2013

== See also ==
- 2014 Web.com Tour Finals graduates
