= 2009 Sunshine Tour =

Golf tour season

2009 Sunshine Tour season
- Duration: 8 January 2009 – 20 December 2009
- Number of official events: 30
- Most wins: (South Africa) Darren Fichardt (3) (South Africa) Brandon Pieters (3) (South Africa) Jaco van Zyl (3)
- Order of Merit: (Denmark) Anders Hansen
- Rookie of the Year: (Canada) Graham DeLaet

The 2009 Sunshine Tour was the 39th season of the Sunshine Tour (formerly the Southern Africa Tour), the main professional golf tour in South Africa since it was formed in 1971.

== Schedule ==
The following table lists official events during the 2009 season.

Date	Tournament	Location	Purse (R)	Winner (Note: The number in brackets after each winner's name is the number of Sunshine Tour events they had won up to and including that tournament. This information is only shown for Sunshine Tour members.)	OWGR points	Other tours (Note: EUR − European Tour.)	Notes
11 Jan	Joburg Open	Gauteng	€1,100,000	(Denmark) Anders Hansen (1)	20	EUR	
18 Jan	Africa Open Golf Challenge	Eastern Cape	5,000,000	(South Africa) Retief Goosen (6)	18		
25 Jan	Dimension Data Pro-Am	North West	1,800,000	(South Africa) Deane Pappas (2)	14		Pro-Am
1 Feb	Nashua Masters	Eastern Cape	1,200,000	(South Africa) Darren Fichardt (7)	14		
15 Feb	Vodacom Championship	Gauteng	2,650,000	(Denmark) Anders Hansen (2)	14		
22 Feb	Telkom PGA Championship	Gauteng	2,750,000	(South Africa) Jaco van Zyl (3)	14		
3 Apr	Vodacom Origins of Golf at Bloemfontein	Free State	480,000	(South Africa) Trevor Fisher Jnr (4)	n/a		
2 May	SAA Pro-Am Invitational (1st)	KwaZulu-Natal	500,000	(Brazil) Adilson da Silva (5)	n/a		
9 May	Samsung Royal Swazi Sun Open	Swaziland	750,000	(South Africa) Jaco van Zyl (4)	n/a		
16 May	Nashua Golf Challenge	North West	500,000	(Scotland) Doug McGuigan (4)	n/a		
22 May	Vodacom Origins of Golf at Pretoria	Gauteng	480,000	(South Africa) Brandon Pieters (1)	n/a		
7 Jun	Lombard Insurance Classic	Swaziland	500,000	(South Africa) Peter Karmis (2)	n/a		
25 Jun	Vodacom Origins of Golf at Fancourt	Western Cape	480,000	(South Africa) Brandon Pieters (2)	n/a		
8 Aug	Suncoast Classic	KwaZulu-Natal	500,000	(South Africa) Louis de Jager (1)	n/a		
14 Aug	Vodacom Origins of Golf at Erinvale	Western Cape	480,000	(South Africa) Jaco Ahlers (1)	n/a		
21 Aug	Telkom PGA Pro-Am	Gauteng	450,000	(South Africa) Jaco van Zyl (5)	n/a		
30 Aug (Note: Postponed from its original date in March.); ~~28 Mar~~	Zambia Open	Zambia	800,000	(South Africa) Jbe' Kruger (1)	n/a		
5 Sep	SAA Pro-Am Invitational (2nd)	Gauteng	500,000	(South Africa) Ryan Tipping (1)	n/a		
18 Sep	Vodacom Origins of Golf at Selborne	KwaZulu-Natal	480,000	(South Africa) Darren Fichardt (8)	n/a		
3 Oct	SAA Pro-Am Invitational (3rd)	Western Cape	500,000	(South Africa) Prinavin Nelson (1)	n/a		
9 Oct	Vodacom Origins of Golf Final	Western Cape	480,000	(South Africa) Brandon Pieters (3)	n/a		
18 Oct	BMG Classic	Gauteng	500,000	(Canada) Graham DeLaet (1)	n/a		
25 Oct	Highveld Classic	Mpumalanga	600,000	(South Africa) Lindani Ndwandwe (2)	n/a		
31 Oct	Platinum Classic	North West	705,000	(South Africa) Darren Fichardt (9)	n/a		
15 Nov	MTC Namibia PGA Championship	Namibia	1,000,000	(South Africa) Hennie Otto (8)	14		
26 Nov	Coca-Cola Charity Championship	Western Cape	550,000	(South Africa) Christiaan Basson (1)	n/a		
2 Dec	Nedbank Affinity Cup	North West	550,000	(South Africa) Jake Roos (2)	n/a		
6 Dec	Nedbank Golf Challenge	North West	US$4,385,000	(Australia) Robert Allenby (n/a)	30		Limited-field event
13 Dec	Alfred Dunhill Championship	Mpumalanga	€1,000,000	(Spain) Pablo Martín (n/a)	20	EUR	
20 Dec	South African Open Championship	Western Cape	€1,000,000	(Scotland) Richie Ramsay (n/a)	32	EUR	Flagship event

== Order of Merit ==
The Order of Merit was based on prize money won during the season, calculated in South African rand.

Position	Player	Prize money (R)
1	(Denmark) Anders Hansen	4,286,038
2	(South Africa) Charl Schwartzel	2,315,188
3	(South Africa) Darren Fichardt	1,475,026
4	(South Africa) Jaco van Zyl	1,333,023
5	(Scotland) David Drysdale	1,184,733

== Awards ==
Award	Winner	Ref.
Rookie of the Year (Bobby Locke Trophy)	(Canada) Graham DeLaet	
