= Joburg Open =

Men's professional golf tournament

Tournament information
- Location: Johannesburg, South Africa
- Established: 2007
- Course: Houghton Golf Club
- Par: 70
- Length: 7,153 yards (6,541 m)
- Tours: European Tour; Asian Tour; Sunshine Tour
- Format: Stroke play
- Prize fund: R 20,500,000
- Month played: March

Tournament record score
- Aggregate: 260 Richard Sterne (2013)
- To par: −27 as above

Current champion
- (England) Dan Bradbury

Final champion
- Location in South Africa Location in Gauteng

The Joburg Open is a men's professional golf tournament that is held in Johannesburg, South Africa. It is an event on the Southern Africa-based Sunshine Tour and co-sanctioned by the European Tour, which attracts a larger prize fund and stronger fields. It is one of several tournaments in South Africa on the European Tour's international schedule, and until 2017 was one of the events where high-finishing players earned entry into The Open Championship if not already exempt.

== History ==
The event was founded in 2007 and was played at the Royal Johannesburg & Kensington Golf Club in Johannesburg, South Africa until 2017. The tournament was contested over both the West and East courses for the first two rounds, enabling a large field of 210 competitors, with the final two rounds being played over the East course following a cut to the top 65 and ties.

Originally contested in January or February, the tournament moved to December in late 2017 and became a tri-sanctioned event with the Asian Tour joining the European Tour and the Sunshine Tour in sanctioning the event; the number of players in the field increased from 210 to 240. The December 2017 event was part of the 2018 European Tour.

Having not been held in 2018 or 2019, in October 2020 it was announced that the tournament would be revived in November 2020, when it would be played at Randpark Golf Club. The 2021 event was shortened due to COVID-19 travel restrictions in place in the UK from South Africa. Originally the event was shortened to 54 holes to allow international players to travel back home in time. However, the following day rain and the threat of lightning shortened the event even further to 36 holes. Thriston Lawrence was the eventual winner.

The tournament was then hosted at Houghton Golf Club in November 2022 and November 2023, as part of the DP World Tour's Opening Swing for the 2024 and 2025 seasons. In the 2025 season, the tournament remained at Houghton Golf Club but shifted to March 2025 as part of the DP World Tour's International Swing. The event was held the week after the South African Open Championship, to minimize international travel and attract a stronger field by allowing golfers to remain in South Africa for both weeks.

== Winners ==
Year	Tours (Note: AFR − Sunshine Tour; ASA − Asian Tour; EUR − European Tour.)	Winner	Score	To par	Margin of victory	Runner(s)-up	Venue
2026	AFR, EUR	(England) Dan Bradbury (2)	263	−17	1 stroke	(South Africa) Casey Jarvis (England) Brandon Robinson-Thompson	Houghton
2025	AFR, EUR	(Scotland) Calum Hill	266	−14	Playoff	(South Africa) Jacques Kruyswijk (South Africa) Shaun Norris	Houghton
2024: No tournament
2023	AFR, EUR	(South Africa) Dean Burmester	262	−18	3 strokes	(South Africa) Darren Fichardt	Houghton
2022	AFR, EUR	(England) Dan Bradbury	263	−21	3 strokes	(Finland) Sami Välimäki	Houghton
2021	AFR, EUR	(South Africa) Thriston Lawrence	130 (Note: Shortened to 36 holes due to bad weather and impending COVID-19 related travel restrictions.)	−12	4 strokes	(South Africa) Zander Lombard	Randpark
2020	AFR, EUR	(Denmark) Joachim B. Hansen	265	−19	2 strokes	(South Africa) Wilco Nienaber	Randpark
2018–19: No tournament
2017 (Dec)	AFR, ASA, EUR	(India) Shubhankar Sharma	264	−23	3 strokes	(South Africa) Erik van Rooyen	Randpark
2017 (Feb)	AFR, EUR	(South Africa) Darren Fichardt	200 (Note: Shortened to 54 holes due to weather.)	−15	1 stroke	(Wales) Stuart Manley (England) Paul Waring	Royal Johannesburg
2016	AFR, EUR	(South Africa) Haydn Porteous	269	−18	2 strokes	(South Africa) Zander Lombard	Royal Johannesburg
2015	AFR, EUR	(England) Andy Sullivan	270	−17	2 strokes	(South Africa) Wallie Coetsee (England) David Howell (Republic of Ireland) Kevin Phelan (South Africa) Jaco van Zyl (England) Anthony Wall	Royal Johannesburg
2014	AFR, EUR	(South Africa) George Coetzee	268	−19	3 strokes	(England) Tyrrell Hatton (South Korea) Jin Jeong (South Africa) Justin Walters	Royal Johannesburg
2013	AFR, EUR	(South Africa) Richard Sterne (2)	260	−27	7 strokes	(South Africa) Charl Schwartzel	Royal Johannesburg
2012	AFR, EUR	(South Africa) Branden Grace	270	−17	1 stroke	(England) Jamie Elson	Royal Johannesburg
2011	AFR, EUR	(South Africa) Charl Schwartzel (2)	265	−19	4 strokes	(South Africa) Garth Mulroy	Royal Johannesburg
2010	AFR, EUR	(South Africa) Charl Schwartzel	261	−23	6 strokes	(Northern Ireland) Darren Clarke (South Africa) Keith Horne	Royal Johannesburg
2009	AFR, EUR	(Denmark) Anders Hansen	269	−15	1 stroke	(South Africa) Andrew McLardy	Royal Johannesburg
2008	AFR, EUR	(South Africa) Richard Sterne	271	−13	Playoff	(Sweden) Magnus A. Carlsson (South Africa) Garth Mulroy	Royal Johannesburg
2007	AFR, EUR	(Argentina) Ariel Cañete	266	−19	2 strokes	(South Africa) Andrew McLardy	Royal Johannesburg
