= 2012 Big Easy Tour =

Golf tour season

2012 Big Easy Tour season
- Duration: 6 March 2012 – 21 September 2012
- Number of official events: 12
- Most wins: (South Africa) Riekus Nortje (3)
- Order of Merit: (South Africa) Teboho Sefatsa

The 2012 Big Easy Tour was the second season of the Big Easy Tour, the official development tour to the Sunshine Tour.

== Schedule ==
The following table lists official events during the 2012 season.

Date	Tournament	Location	Purse (R)	Winner (Note: The number in brackets after each winner's name is the number of Big Easy Tour events they had won up to and including that tournament. It is rare for someone to accumulate many wins on the Big Easy Tour as success at this level usually leads to promotion to the Sunshine Tour.)
7 Mar	Houghton	Gauteng	100,000	(South Africa) Toto Thimba Jr. (1)
28 Mar	Observatory	Gauteng	100,000	(Zimbabwe) Ryan Cairns (1)
13 Apr	Modderfontein	Gauteng	100,000	(South Africa) Johan Bekker (1)
11 May	Kempton Park	Gauteng	100,000	(England) Jeff Inglis (1)
25 May	ERPM	Gauteng	100,000	(South Africa) Riekus Nortje (1)
22 Jun	Benoni CC	Gauteng	100,000	(South Africa) Riekus Nortje (2)
18 Jul	Royal J & K	Gauteng	100,000	(South Africa) Jared Harvey (1)
3 Aug	Gary Player CC	North West	100,000	(South Africa) Jared Harvey (2)
8 Aug	Maccauvlei	Gauteng	100,000	(England) Jeff Inglis (2)
15 Aug	Irene	Gauteng	100,000	(South Africa) Riekus Nortje (3)
31 Aug	Glendower	Gauteng	100,000	(South Africa) Rudy Whitfield (1)
21 Sep	Big Easy Tour Championship	Gauteng	250,000	(Zimbabwe) Mark Williams (1)

== Order of Merit ==
The Order of Merit was based on prize money won during the season, calculated in South African rand. The top five players on the Order of Merit earned status to play on the 2013 Sunshine Tour.

Position	Player	Prize money (R)
1	(South Africa) Teboho Sefatsa	76,170
2	(South Africa) Riekus Nortje	73,869
3	(England) Jeff Inglis	66,274
4	(Zimbabwe) Mark Williams	63,450
5	(South Africa) Johan Bekker	46,331
