= Nedbank Golf Challenge =

Golf tournament in South Africa

Coordinates: 25.339°S 27.106°E

Tournament information
- Location: Sun City, South Africa
- Established: 1981
- Course: Gary Player Country Club
- Par: 72
- Length: 7,834 yards (7,163 m)
- Tours: European Tour; Sunshine Tour
- Format: Stroke play
- Prize fund: US$6,000,000
- Month played: December

Tournament record score
- Aggregate: 263 Ernie Els (1999)
- To par: −25 as above

Current champion
- (Norway) Kristoffer Reitan

Final champion
- Location in South Africa Location in North West

The Nedbank Golf Challenge, previously known as the Million Dollar Challenge, is an annual men's professional golf tournament played at the Gary Player Country Club in Sun City, North West province, South Africa. It was first played in 1981 and takes place towards the end of the year in November or December.

For many years the tournament was a small-field invitational stroke play event with typically 12 players competing. Since it became a European Tour event in 2013, the field size has increased from 30 (2013–2015) to 72 (2016–present). Originally it was not an official event for any of the major tours.

From 2010 to 2012, a separate tournament for senior golfers was held concurrently.

== History ==
The first tournament was played from 31 December 1981 to 4 January 1982 with a field of 5: Seve Ballesteros, Johnny Miller, Jack Nicklaus, Gary Player and Lee Trevino. Ballesteros and Miller tied on 277 with Nicklaus a stroke behind after he missed a putt at the final hole. Miller beat Ballesteros at the ninth hole of a sudden-death playoff. The pair played the 16th to 18th holes three times before Ballesteros three-putted. Miller won $500,000 out of total prize money of $1,000,000.

The date was moved to early December 1982 for the second tournament, with 10 players competing. Total prize money remained at $1,000,000 with $300,000 for the winner and $50,000 for the 10th player. There was another playoff, with Raymond Floyd beating Craig Stadler at the fourth extra hole. The format remained unchanged from 1983 to 1986 with the event played in early December each year.

The 1987 event introduced a winner-take-all $1,000,000 first prize, although there were additional prizes for the lowest round each day. The field was reduced to 8 players. Ian Woosnam won by 4 strokes and took the first million dollar prize in golf. The winner-take-all idea was dropped for 1988, although the first prize remained as $1,000,000. The format remained largely unchanged through 1999, with the first prize always $1,000,000, although the field increased from 8 to 10 in 1989 and to 12 from 1993. There were two playoffs during this period. In 1996 Colin Montgomerie beat Ernie Els with a birdie at the third extra hole, while in 1998 Nick Price beat Tiger Woods with a birdie at the fifth extra hole.

In 2006, the tournament carried World Rankings points for the first time since 1999. In 2013 it was expanded to 30 players: the defending tournament champion; the top 10 PGA Tour FedEx Cup players, the top 10 European Tour Race to Dubai players; the Sunshine Tour, Asian Tour, Japan Golf Tour and PGA Tour of Australasia Order of Merit winners; the Alfred Dunhill Championship winner; and the top 5 South African players in the World Rankings.

From 2000 to 2002 the first prize was increased to US$2 million, but the following year the winner's share of the total prize fund was reduced from more than half to around 30%. The standard winner's share on the PGA Tour is 18% and on the European Tour it is 16.67%. In 2006 the winner received $1.2 million out of a total purse of US$4.385 million, so the prize distribution is now not far from the normal pattern for a professional tournament, once allowance is made for the small size of the field. That US$2 million first prize remained the largest in professional golf, but was matched in 2011 by the Lake Malaren Shanghai Masters.

The 2016 event was part of the European Tour Final Series, replacing the BMW Masters, while in 2017 the event was part of the new Rolex Series. Since 2016, the field of 72 consists of the top 64 available players from the current year Race to Dubai standings, the defending champion, the winner of the Sunshine Tour order of merit from previous year, and tournament invitations.

== Winners ==
European Tour (Rolex Series)	2017–2019
European Tour (Race to Dubai finals series)	2016
European Tour (Regular)	2013–2015, 2022–
Sunshine Tour	2006–2012
Unofficial event	1981–2005

#	Year	Tour(s) (Note: AFR − Sunshine Tour; EUR − European Tour.)	Winner	Score	To par	Margin of victory	Runner(s)-up	Purse ($)	Winner's share ($)
Nedbank Golf Challenge
43rd	2025	AFR, EUR	(Norway) Kristoffer Reitan	271	−17	1 stroke	(England) Dan Bradbury (South Africa) Jayden Schaper	6,000,000	1,020,000
42nd	2024	AFR, EUR	(United States) Johannes Veerman	283	−5	1 stroke	(England) Matthew Jordan (France) Romain Langasque (South Africa) Aldrich Potgieter	6,000,000	1,020,000
41st	2023	EUR	(United States) Max Homa	269	−19	4 strokes	(Denmark) Nicolai Højgaard	6,000,000	1,020,000
40th	2022	AFR, (Note: In 2022 the event was sanctioned by the Sunshine Tour, however it was an unofficial money event; therefore the win is considered unofficial on that tour.) EUR	(England) Tommy Fleetwood (2)	277	−11	1 stroke	(New Zealand) Ryan Fox	6,000,000	1,020,000
–	2021	AFR, EUR	Cancelled due to the COVID-19 pandemic						
–	2020	AFR, EUR	Cancelled due to the COVID-19 pandemic						
39th	2019	AFR, EUR	(England) Tommy Fleetwood	276	−12	Playoff	(Sweden) Marcus Kinhult	7,500,000	2,500,000
38th	2018	EUR	(England) Lee Westwood (3)	273	−15	3 strokes	(Spain) Sergio García	7,500,000	1,250,000
37th	2017	EUR	(South Africa) Branden Grace	277	−11	1 stroke	(Scotland) Scott Jamieson	7,500,000	1,166,660
36th	2016	EUR	(Sweden) Alex Norén	274	−14	6 strokes	(South Korea) Wang Jeung-hun	7,000,000	1,166,660
35th	2015	AFR, EUR	(Australia) Marc Leishman	269	−19	6 strokes	(Sweden) Henrik Stenson	6,500,000	1,250,000
34th	2014	AFR, EUR	(England) Danny Willett	270	−18	4 strokes	(England) Ross Fisher	6,500,000	1,250,000
33rd	2013	AFR, EUR	(Denmark) Thomas Bjørn	268	−20	2 strokes	(Wales) Jamie Donaldson (Spain) Sergio García	6,500,000	1,250,000
32nd	2012	AFR	(Germany) Martin Kaymer	280	−8	2 strokes	(South Africa) Charl Schwartzel	5,000,000	1,250,000
31st	2011	AFR	(England) Lee Westwood (2)	273	−15	2 strokes	(Sweden) Robert Karlsson	5,000,000	1,250,000
30th	2010	AFR	(England) Lee Westwood	271	−17	8 strokes	(South Africa) Tim Clark	5,000,000	1,250,000
29th	2009	AFR	(Australia) Robert Allenby	277	−11	Playoff	(Sweden) Henrik Stenson	4,385,000	1,200,000
28th	2008	AFR	(Sweden) Henrik Stenson	267	−21	9 strokes	(United States) Kenny Perry	4,385,000	1,200,000
27th	2007	AFR	(South Africa) Trevor Immelman	272	−16	1 stroke	(England) Justin Rose	4,385,000	1,200,000
26th	2006	AFR	(United States) Jim Furyk (2)	276	−12	2 strokes	(Sweden) Henrik Stenson	4,385,000	1,200,000
25th	2005		(United States) Jim Furyk	282	−6	Playoff	(Northern Ireland) Darren Clarke (South Africa) Retief Goosen (Australia) Adam Scott	4,060,000	1,200,000
24th	2004		(South Africa) Retief Goosen	281	−7	6 strokes	(Australia) Stuart Appleby (South Africa) Ernie Els	4,060,000	1,200,000
23rd	2003		(Spain) Sergio García (2)	274	−14	Playoff	(South Africa) Retief Goosen	4,060,000	1,200,000
22nd	2002		(South Africa) Ernie Els (3)	267	−21	8 strokes	(Scotland) Colin Montgomerie	4,060,000	2,000,000
21st	2001		(Spain) Sergio García	268	−20	Playoff	(South Africa) Ernie Els	4,060,000	2,000,000
20th	2000		(South Africa) Ernie Els (2)	268	−20	Playoff	(England) Lee Westwood	4,060,000	2,000,000
Nedbank Million Dollar Challenge
19th	1999		(South Africa) Ernie Els	263	−25	5 strokes	(Scotland) Colin Montgomerie	2,500,000	1,000,000
18th	1998		(Zimbabwe) Nick Price (3)	273	−15	Playoff	(United States) Tiger Woods	2,500,000	1,000,000
17th	1997		(Zimbabwe) Nick Price (2)	275	−13	1 stroke	(South Africa) Ernie Els (United States) Davis Love III	2,500,000	1,000,000
16th	1996		(Scotland) Colin Montgomerie	274	−14	Playoff	(South Africa) Ernie Els	2,500,000	1,000,000
15th	1995		(United States) Corey Pavin	276	−12	5 strokes	(Zimbabwe) Nick Price	2,500,000	1,000,000
14th	1994		(England) Nick Faldo	272	−16	3 strokes	(Zimbabwe) Nick Price	2,500,000	1,000,000
13th	1993		(Zimbabwe) Nick Price	264	−24	12 strokes	(Zimbabwe) Mark McNulty	2,500,000	1,000,000
12th	1992		(South Africa) David Frost (3)	276	−12	4 strokes	(United States) John Cook	2,500,000	1,000,000
11th	1991		(Germany) Bernhard Langer (2)	272	−16	5 strokes	(United States) Mark Calcavecchia	2,500,000	1,000,000
10th	1990		(South Africa) David Frost (2)	284	−4	1 stroke	(Spain) José María Olazábal	2,500,000	1,000,000
9th	1989		(South Africa) David Frost	276	−12	3 strokes	(United States) Scott Hoch	2,500,000	1,000,000
8th	1988		(South Africa) Fulton Allem	278	−10	1 stroke	(United States) Don Pooley	1,500,000	1,000,000
7th	1987		(Wales) Ian Woosnam	274	−14	4 strokes	(England) Nick Faldo	1,000,000	1,000,000
6th	1986		(Zimbabwe) Mark McNulty	282	−6	3 strokes	(United States) Lanny Wadkins	1,000,000	300,000
5th	1985		(West Germany) Bernhard Langer	278	−10	2 strokes	(United States) Lanny Wadkins	1,000,000	300,000
4th	1984		(Spain) Seve Ballesteros (2)	279	−9	6 strokes	(England) Nick Faldo	1,000,000	300,000
3rd	1983		(Spain) Seve Ballesteros	274	−14	5 strokes	(England) Nick Faldo (Australia) David Graham (United States) Fuzzy Zoeller	1,000,000	300,000
2nd	1982		(United States) Raymond Floyd	280	−8	Playoff	(United States) Craig Stadler	1,000,000	300,000
1st (Note: The 1981 event was played from 31 December 1981 to 3 January 1982.)	1981		(United States) Johnny Miller	277	−11	Playoff	(Spain) Seve Ballesteros	1,000,000	500,000
