= Chris Swanepoel =

South African professional golfer (born 1984)

Personal information
- Nationality: South Africa
- Born: 22 November 1984 (age 41)

Career
- Sport: Golf
- Turned professional: 2003
- Current tour: Sunshine Tour
- Professional wins: 4

Number of wins by tour
- Sunshine Tour: 4

Chris Swanepoel (born 22 November 1984) is a South African professional golfer.

== Career ==
Swanepoel has played on the Sunshine Tour since 2004. He has won four times on tour, including the Golden Pilsener Zimbabwe Open in April 2012.

== Professional wins (4) ==
=== Sunshine Tour wins (4) ===
No.	Date	Tournament	Winning score	Margin of victory	Runner-up
1	15 Apr 2007	Eskom Power Cup	−17 (70-63-66=199)	4 strokes	(South Africa) Warren Abery
2	10 Jun 2011	Vodacom Origins of Golf at Arabella	−11 (72-65-68=205)	3 strokes	(South Africa) Christiaan Basson
3	22 Apr 2012	Golden Pilsener Zimbabwe Open	−15 (71-69-69-64=273)	Playoff	(South Africa) Trevor Fisher Jnr
4	9 Oct 2015	Sun Boardwalk Challenge	−8 (67-69-72=208)	Playoff	(South Africa) Ulrich van den Berg

Sunshine Tour playoff record (2–2)

No.	Year	Tournament	Opponent(s)	Result
1	2009	SAA Pro-Am Invitational	(South Africa) Ryan Tipping	Lost to birdie on second extra hole
2	2012	Platinum Classic	(South Africa) Anthony Michael, (South Africa) Jake Roos	Roos won with birdie on fifth extra hole
3	2012	Golden Pilsener Zimbabwe Open	(South Africa) Trevor Fisher Jnr	Won with par on second extra hole
4	2015	Sun Boardwalk Challenge	(South Africa) Ulrich van den Berg	Won with birdie on first extra hole
