= 2014 Sunshine Tour =

Golf tour season

2014 Sunshine Tour season
- Duration: 6 February 2014 – 11 January 2015
- Number of official events: 26
- Most wins: (South Africa) Louis de Jager (2) (South Africa) Keith Horne (2) (South Africa) Titch Moore (2) (South Africa) Daniel van Tonder (2)
- Order of Merit: (South Africa) Thomas Aiken
- Rookie of the Year: (South Africa) Haydn Porteous

The 2014 Sunshine Tour was the 44th season of the Sunshine Tour (formerly the Southern Africa Tour), the main professional golf tour in South Africa since it was formed in 1971.

== Schedule ==
The following table lists official events during the 2014 season.

Date	Tournament	Location	Purse (R)	Winner (Note: The number in brackets after each winner's name is the number of Sunshine Tour events they had won up to and including that tournament. This information is only shown for Sunshine Tour members.)	OWGR points	Other tours (Note: EUR − European Tour.)	Notes
9 Feb	Joburg Open	Gauteng	€1,300,000	(South Africa) George Coetzee (5)	20	EUR	
16 Feb	Africa Open	Eastern Cape	€1,000,000	(South Africa) Thomas Aiken (8)	20	EUR	
23 Feb	Dimension Data Pro-Am	Western Cape	3,750,000	(Argentina) Estanislao Goya (n/a)	14		Pro-Am
2 Mar	Tshwane Open	Gauteng	€1,500,000	(England) Ross Fisher (n/a)	20	EUR	
23 Mar	Investec Cup	North West	1,000,000	(South Africa) Trevor Fisher Jnr (8)	14		
6 Apr	Telkom Business PGA Championship	Gauteng	3,750,000	(South Africa) Titch Moore (8)	14		
13 Apr	Golden Pilsener Zimbabwe Open	Zimbabwe	1,800,000	(South Africa) Jbe' Kruger (3)	14		
10 May	Investec Royal Swazi Open	Swaziland	1,000,000	(South Africa) Daniel van Tonder (1)	14		
18 May	Mopani Copper Mines Zambia Open	Zambia	US$250,000	(South Africa) Wallie Coetsee (2)	14		
25 May	Lombard Insurance Classic	Swaziland	900,000	(South Africa) Christiaan Basson (3)	6		
8 Jun	Zambia Sugar Open	Zambia	1,200,000	(South Africa) Lyle Rowe (1)	14		New tournament
27 Jun	Vodacom Origins of Golf at Euphoria	Limpopo	600,000	(South Africa) Daniel van Tonder (2)	6		
4 Jul	Sun City Challenge	North West	700,000	(South Africa) Dean Burmester (2)	6		
25 Jul	Vodacom Origins of Golf at Arabella	Western Cape	600,000	(South Africa) Jean Hugo (15)	4		
1 Aug	Vodacom Origins of Golf at St Francis	Eastern Cape	600,000	(South Africa) Keith Horne (6)	6		
29 Aug	Wild Waves Golf Challenge	Kwazulu-Natal	700,000	(South Africa) Colin Nel (1)	6		
5 Sep	Vodacom Origins of Golf at Wild Coast Sun	Eastern Cape	600,000	(South Africa) Louis de Jager (2)	7		
3 Oct	Vodacom Origins of Golf at Vaal de Grace	Free State	600,000	(South Africa) PH McIntyre (1)	4		
10 Oct	Sun Boardwalk Golf Challenge	Eastern Cape	600,000	(South Africa) Titch Moore (9)	4		New tournament
19 Oct	BMG Classic	Gauteng	800,000	(South Africa) Merrick Bremner (4)	7		
31 Oct	Vodacom Origins of Golf Final	Western Cape	650,000	(South Africa) Keith Horne (7)	4		
6 Nov	Nedbank Affinity Cup	North West	750,000	(South Africa) Louis de Jager (3)	4		
30 Nov	Lion of Africa Cape Town Open	Western Cape	1,500,000	(South Africa) Jaco Ahlers (2)	14		
7 Dec	Nedbank Golf Challenge	North West	US$6,500,000	(England) Danny Willett (n/a)	38	EUR	Limited-field event
14 Dec	Alfred Dunhill Championship	Mpumalanga	€1,500,000	(South Africa) Branden Grace (4)	22	EUR	
11 Jan	South African Open Championship	Gauteng	14,500,000	(England) Andy Sullivan (n/a)	32	EUR	Flagship event

== Order of Merit ==
The Order of Merit was based on prize money won during the season, calculated in South African rand.

Position	Player	Prize money (R)
1	(South Africa) Thomas Aiken	4,057,642
2	(South Africa) Daniel van Tonder	3,900,386
3	(South Africa) George Coetzee	3,339,251
4	(South Africa) Charl Schwartzel	2,081,444
5	(South Africa) Trevor Fisher Jnr	2,052,708

== Awards ==
Award	Winner	Ref.
Rookie of the Year (Bobby Locke Trophy)	(South Africa) Haydn Porteous	

== See also ==
- 2014 Big Easy Tour
