= 2016 WGC-Dell Match Play =

Coordinates: 30.343°N 97.797°W

Tournament information
- Dates: March 23–27, 2016
- Location: Austin, Texas, U.S.
- Course: Austin Country Club
- Tours: PGA Tour; European Tour; Japan Golf Tour
- Format: Match play – 18 holes

Statistics
- Par: 71
- Length: 7,073 yards (6,468 m)
- Field: 64 players
- Prize fund: $9,500,000 €8,374,981
- Winner's share: $1,620,000 €1,428,155

Champion
- (Australia) Jason Day
- def. Louis Oosthuizen 5 & 4

Location in the United States
Location in Texas

The 2016 WGC-Dell Match Play was the 18th WGC-Dell Match Play Championship, played March 23–27 at Austin Country Club in Austin, Texas. It was the second of four World Golf Championships in 2016. The Championship was won by Jason Day, it was his second WGC-Match Play win in three years.

== Field ==
The field consisted of the top 64 players available from the Official World Golf Ranking on March 13. However, the seedings are based on the World Ranking on March 20.

Henrik Stenson (ranked 7 on March 13, personal reasons) and Jim Furyk (ranked 15, wrist surgery) did not compete, allowing entry for Patton Kizzire (ranked 65) and Thorbjørn Olesen (ranked 66).

== Format ==
In 2014 and earlier editions, the championship was a single elimination match play event. A new format was introduced in 2015, and the championship now starts with 16 groups of four players playing round-robin matches, on Wednesday through Friday. The top 16 seeded players are allocated to the 16 groups, one in each group. The remaining 48 players are placed into three pools (seeds 17–32, seeds 33–48, seeds 49–64). One player is randomly selected from each pool to complete each group.

In 2015, there were no halved matches in group play with extra holes played to determine the winner for each match if necessary. In 2016, all group play matches were limited to 18 holes with one point awarded for a win and one-half point for a halved match. Ties for first place in a group were broken by a sudden-death stroke play playoff, beginning on hole 1.

The winners of each group advanced to a single-elimination bracket on the weekend, with the round of 16 and quarterfinals on Saturday, and the semifinals, finals, and consolation match on Sunday.

Pool A – Top 16 seeds
Seed	Rank	Player
1	1	(United States) Jordan Spieth
2	2	(Australia) Jason Day
3	3	(Northern Ireland) Rory McIlroy
4	4	(United States) Bubba Watson
5	5	(United States) Rickie Fowler
6	6	(Australia) Adam Scott
7	8	(England) Justin Rose
8	9	(United States) Dustin Johnson
9	10	(United States) Patrick Reed
10	11	(England) Danny Willett
11	12	(South Africa) Branden Grace
12	13	(Japan) Hideki Matsuyama
13	14	(Spain) Sergio García
14	15	(United States) Zach Johnson
15	17	(United States) Brandt Snedeker
16	18	(South Africa) Louis Oosthuizen

Pool B
Seed	Rank	Player
17	19	(United States) Phil Mickelson
18	20	(United States) Brooks Koepka
19	21	(South Africa) Charl Schwartzel
20	22	(United States) Kevin Kisner
21	23	(United States) J. B. Holmes
22	24	(United States) Jimmy Walker
23	25	(England) Paul Casey
24	26	(Republic of Ireland) Shane Lowry
25	27	(Australia) Marc Leishman
26	28	(United States) Kevin Na
27	29	(South Korea) An Byeong-hun
28	30	(United States) Matt Kuchar
29	31	(England) Andy Sullivan
30	32	(United States) Bill Haas
31	33	(United States) Justin Thomas
32	34	(Scotland) Russell Knox

Pool C
Seed	Rank	Player
33	35	(Argentina) Emiliano Grillo
34	36	(New Zealand) Danny Lee
35	37	(Austria) Bernd Wiesberger
36	38	(Thailand) Thongchai Jaidee
37	39	(Thailand) Kiradech Aphibarnrat
38	40	(Sweden) David Lingmerth
39	41	(France) Victor Dubuisson
40	42	(United States) Billy Horschel
41	43	(England) Chris Wood
42	44	(England) Matt Fitzpatrick
43	45	(Denmark) Søren Kjeldsen
44	46	(Germany) Martin Kaymer
45	47	(United States) Ryan Moore
46	48	(United States) Smylie Kaufman
47	49	(United States) Scott Piercy
48	50	(India) Anirban Lahiri

Pool D
Seed	Rank	Player
49	51	(United States) Robert Streb
50	52	(South Africa) Jaco van Zyl
51	53	(Wales) Jamie Donaldson
52	54	(Spain) Rafa Cabrera-Bello
53	55	(United States) Daniel Berger
54	56	(United States) Chris Kirk
55	57	(Belgium) Thomas Pieters
56	58	(United States) Charley Hoffman
57	59	(Argentina) Fabián Gómez
58	60	(United States) Jason Dufner
59	61	(England) Lee Westwood
60	62	(Australia) Marcus Fraser
61	63	(Australia) Matt Jones
62	64	(Northern Ireland) Graeme McDowell
63	65	(United States) Patton Kizzire
64	66	(Denmark) Thorbjørn Olesen

Rank – Official World Golf Ranking on March 20, 2016.

== Results ==
=== Pool play ===
Players were divided into 16 groups of four players and played round-robin matches Wednesday to Friday.

- Round 1 – March 23
- Round 2 – March 24
- Round 3 – March 25

Notes: Round 1

Of the 32 matches played, 9 were "upsets" with the lower seeded player beating the higher seeded player and 6 matches were halved. These included top seeds #5 Rickie Fowler, #8 Dustin Johnson, #11 Branden Grace, and #12 Hideki Matsuyama losing matches and #4 Bubba Watson, #6 Adam Scott, and #10 Danny Willett halving matches.

Notes: Round 2

Of the 32 matches played, 5 were upsets with the lower seeded player beating the higher seeded player and 7 matches were halved. These included top seeds #10 Danny Willett and #13 Sergio García losing matches and #5 Rickie Fowler, #7 Justin Rose, and #15 Brandt Snedeker halving matches. There were 13 players that had perfect 2–0–0 records, including the top three seeds: Jordan Spieth, Jason Day, and Rory McIlroy.

Notes: Round 3

Of the 32 matches played, 10 were upsets with the lower seeded player beating the higher seeded player and 4 matches were halved. These included top seeds #4 Bubba Watson, #6 Adam Scott, and #7 Justin Rose losing matches and #3 Rory McIlroy and #5 Rickie Fowler halving matches. Four groups went to sudden-death playoffs, each involving two players, with three ending after one hole and the fourth ending on the second hole. Six golfers advanced with perfect 3–0–0 records: #1 Jordan Spieth, #2 Jason Day, #9 Patrick Reed, #14 Zach Johnson, #16 Louis Oosthuizen, and #30 Bill Haas. Two golfers conceded their matches early, Paul Casey conceded to Jason Day after six holes due to illness and Daniel Berger conceded Matt Fitzpatrick at the start of the match due to a wrist injury suffered on the 18th hole on Thursday, when he clipped the rock wall and missed the ball while trying to hit his second shot. Eight of the top 16 seeds advanced while three of the bottom 16 seeds advanced including #63 Patton Kizzire. Eleven Americans advance to the round of 16.

Group 1
Round	Winner	Score	Loser
1	Spieth	3 & 2	Donaldson
1	Dubuisson	3 & 2	Thomas
2	Spieth	5 & 4	Dubuisson
2	Donaldson	2 up	Thomas
3	Spieth	3 & 2	Thomas
3	Donaldson	1 up	Dubuisson

Seed	Player	W	L	H	Points	Finish
1	(United States) Jordan Spieth	3	0	0	3	1
51	(Wales) Jamie Donaldson	2	1	0	2	2
39	(France) Victor Dubuisson	1	2	0	1	3
31	(United States) Justin Thomas	0	3	0	0	4

Group 2
Round	Winner	Score	Loser
1	Day	3 & 2	McDowell
1	Jaidee	2 & 1	Casey
2	Day	5 & 3	Jaidee
2	Casey vs McDowell – halved		
3	Day	Conceded	Casey
3	Jaidee vs McDowell – halved		

Seed	Player	W	L	H	Points	Finish
2	(Australia) Jason Day	3	0	0	3	1
36	(Thailand) Thongchai Jaidee	1	1	1	1.5	2
62	(Northern Ireland) Graeme McDowell	0	1	2	1	3
23	(England) Paul Casey	0	2	1	0.5	4

- Casey conceded his match with Day after six holes
  (the match was all-square) due to illness.

Group 3
Round	Winner	Score	Loser
1	McIlroy	1 up	Olesen
1	Na	2 & 1	Kaufman
2	McIlroy	3 & 1	Kaufman
2	Na	3 & 2	Olesen
3	McIlroy vs Na – halved		
3	Olesen	2 & 1	Kaufman

Seed	Player	W	L	H	Points	Finish
3	(Northern Ireland) Rory McIlroy	2	0	1	2.5	1
26	(United States) Kevin Na	2	0	1	2.5	2
64	(Denmark) Thorbjørn Olesen	1	2	0	1	3
46	(United States) Smylie Kaufman	0	3	0	0	4

- McIlroy advanced in sudden-death playoff over Na – 2 holes

Group 4
Round	Winner	Score	Loser
1	Watson vs Kizzire – halved		
1	Grillo	3 & 2	Holmes
2	Watson	2 up	Grillo
2	Holmes vs Kizzire – halved		
3	Holmes	1 up	Watson
3	Kizzire	2 up	Grillo

Seed	Player	W	L	H	Points	Finish
63	(United States) Patton Kizzire	1	0	2	2	1
4	(United States) Bubba Watson	1	1	1	1.5	T2
21	(United States) J. B. Holmes	1	1	1	1.5	T2
33	(Argentina) Emiliano Grillo	1	2	0	1	4

Group 5
Round	Winner	Score	Loser
1	Dufner	2 & 1	Fowler
1	An vs Piercy – halved		
2	Fowler vs Piercy – halved		
2	An	2 up	Dufner
3	Fowler vs An – halved		
3	Piercy	1 up	Dufner

Seed	Player	W	L	H	Points	Finish
27	(South Korea) An Byeong-hun	1	0	2	2	1
47	(United States) Scott Piercy	1	0	2	2	2
58	(United States) Jason Dufner	1	2	0	1	T3
5	(United States) Rickie Fowler	0	1	2	1	T3

- An advanced in sudden-death playoff over Piercy – 1 hole

Group 6
Round	Winner	Score	Loser
1	Scott vs Pieters – halved		
1	Haas	2 & 1	Wood
2	Scott	3 & 2	Wood
2	Haas	4 & 2	Pieters
3	Haas	1 up	Scott
3	Pieters	3 & 2	Wood

Seed	Player	W	L	H	Points	Finish
30	(United States) Bill Haas	3	0	0	3	1
6	(Australia) Adam Scott	1	1	1	1.5	T2
55	(Belgium) Thomas Pieters	1	1	1	1.5	T2
41	(England) Chris Wood	0	3	0	0	4

Group 7
Round	Winner	Score	Loser
1	Rose	2 up	Gómez
1	Kuchar	6 & 5	Lahiri
2	Rose vs Lahiri – halved		
2	Kuchar vs Gomez – halved		
3	Kuchar	3 & 2	Rose
3	Lahiri	4 & 2	Gómez

Seed	Player	W	L	H	Points	Finish
28	(United States) Matt Kuchar	2	0	1	2.5	1
7	(England) Justin Rose	1	1	1	1.5	T2
48	(India) Anirban Lahiri	1	1	1	1.5	T2
57	(Argentina) Fabián Gómez	0	2	1	0.5	4

Group 8
Round	Winner	Score	Loser
1	Streb	3 & 2	D Johnson
1	Aphibarnrat	2 & 1	Walker
2	D Johnson	5 & 4	Aphibarnrat
2	Walker	4 & 3	Streb
3	D Johnson	2 & 1	Walker
3	Aphibarnrat	1 up	Streb

Seed	Player	W	L	H	Points	Finish
8	(United States) Dustin Johnson	2	1	0	2	1
37	(Thailand) Kiradech Aphibarnrat	2	1	0	2	2
22	(United States) Jimmy Walker	1	2	0	1	T3
49	(United States) Robert Streb	1	2	0	1	T3

- D Johnson advanced in sudden-death playoff
  over Aphibarnrat – 1 hole

Group 9
Round	Winner	Score	Loser
1	Reed	1 up	Berger
1	Mickelson	5 & 4	Fitzpatrick
2	Reed	4 & 3	Fitzpatrick
2	Mickelson	1 up	Berger
3	Reed	5 & 4	Mickelson
3	Fitzpatrick	Conceded	Berger

Seed	Player	W	L	H	Points	Finish
9	(United States) Patrick Reed	3	0	0	3	1
17	(United States) Phil Mickelson	2	1	0	2	2
42	(England) Matt Fitzpatrick	1	2	0	1	3
53	(United States) Daniel Berger	0	3	0	0	4

- Berger conceded his match to Fitzpatrick due to a wrist injury.

Group 10
Round	Winner	Score	Loser
1	Willett vs Van Zyl – halved		
1	Koepka	3 & 2	Horschel
2	Horschel	3 & 2	Willett
2	Koepka	5 & 4	Van Zyl
3	Willett	4 & 3	Koepka
3	Van Zyl	3 & 1	Horschel

Seed	Player	W	L	H	Points	Finish
18	(United States) Brooks Koepka	2	1	0	2	1
10	(England) Danny Willett	1	1	1	1.5	T2
50	(South Africa) Jaco van Zyl	1	1	1	1.5	T2
40	(United States) Billy Horschel	1	2	0	1	4

Group 11
Round	Winner	Score	Loser
1	Kirk	3 & 1	Grace
1	Knox vs Lingmerth – halved		
2	Grace	4 & 3	Lingmerth
2	Knox	2 & 1	Kirk
3	Grace	5 & 4	Knox
3	Kirk	3 & 2	Lingmerth

Seed	Player	W	L	H	Points	Finish
54	(United States) Chris Kirk	2	1	0	2	1
11	(South Africa) Branden Grace	2	1	0	2	2
32	(Scotland) Russell Knox	1	1	1	1.5	3
38	(Sweden) David Lingmerth	0	2	1	0.5	4

- Kirk advanced in sudden-death playoff over Grace – 1 hole

Group 12
Round	Winner	Score	Loser
1	Cabrera-Bello	1 up	Matsuyama
1	Kisner	2 & 1	Kjeldsen
2	Matsuyama	4 & 2	Kjeldsen
2	Cabrera-Bello	4 & 3	Kisner
3	Matsuyama	3 & 2	Kisner
3	Kjeldsen vs Cabrera-Bello – halved		

Seed	Player	W	L	H	Points	Finish
52	(Spain) Rafa Cabrera-Bello	2	0	1	2.5	1
12	(Japan) Hideki Matsuyama	2	1	0	2	2
20	(United States) Kevin Kisner	1	2	0	1	3
43	(Denmark) Søren Kjeldsen	0	2	1	0.5	4

Group 13
Round	Winner	Score	Loser
1	García	1 up	Westwood
1	Leishman vs Moore – halved		
2	Moore	1 up	García
2	Westwood	1 up	Leishman
3	García	5 & 4	Leishman
3	Moore	3 & 1	Westwood

Seed	Player	W	L	H	Points	Finish
45	(United States) Ryan Moore	2	0	1	2.5	1
13	(Spain) Sergio García	2	1	0	2	2
59	(England) Lee Westwood	1	2	0	1	3
25	(Australia) Marc Leishman	0	2	1	0.5	4

Group 14
Round	Winner	Score	Loser
1	Z Johnson	4 & 3	Fraser
1	Kaymer	1 up	Lowry
2	Z Johnson	8 & 6	Kaymer
2	Lowry vs Fraser – halved		
3	Z Johnson	4 & 3	Lowry
3	Kaymer	4 & 3	Fraser

Seed	Player	W	L	H	Points	Finish
14	(United States) Zach Johnson	3	0	0	3	1
44	(Germany) Martin Kaymer	2	1	0	2	2
24	(Republic of Ireland) Shane Lowry	0	2	1	0.5	T3
60	(Australia) Marcus Fraser	0	2	1	0.5	T3

Group 15
Round	Winner	Score	Loser
1	Snedeker	2 & 1	Hoffman
1	Schwartzel	1 up	Lee
2	Snedeker vs Lee – halved		
2	Schwartzel	3 & 2	Hoffman
3	Snedeker	5 & 3	Schwartzel
3	Hoffman	4 & 2	Lee

Seed	Player	W	L	H	Points	Finish
15	(United States) Brandt Snedeker	2	0	1	2.5	1
19	(South Africa) Charl Schwartzel	2	1	0	2	2
56	(United States) Charley Hoffman	1	2	0	1	3
34	(New Zealand) Danny Lee	0	2	1	0.5	4

Group 16
Round	Winner	Score	Loser
1	Oosthuizen	2 & 1	Jones
1	Sullivan	3 & 2	Wiesberger
2	Oosthuizen	2 & 1	Wiesberger
2	Sullivan	3 & 1	Jones
3	Oosthuizen	4 & 2	Sullivan
3	Wiesberger vs Jones – halved		

Seed	Player	W	L	H	Points	Finish
16	(South Africa) Louis Oosthuizen	3	0	0	3	1
29	(England) Andy Sullivan	2	1	0	2	2
35	(Austria) Bernd Wiesberger	0	2	1	0.5	T3
61	(Australia) Matt Jones	0	2	1	0.5	T3

=== Final 16 bracket ===
Round of 16; March 26 – morning
1	(United States) Jordan Spieth
16	(South Africa) Louis Oosthuizen	4&2
8	(United States) Dustin Johnson	3&2
9	(United States) Patrick Reed
27	(South Korea) An Byeong-hun
52	(Spain) Rafa Cabrera-Bello	Conc
63	(United States) Patton Kizzire
45	(United States) Ryan Moore	4&3
30	(United States) Bill Haas
54	(United States) Chris Kirk	2&1
3	(Northern Ireland) Rory McIlroy	1up
14	(United States) Zach Johnson
28	(United States) Matt Kuchar
18	(United States) Brooks Koepka	1up
2	(Australia) Jason Day	3&2
15	(United States) Brandt Snedeker

Quarterfinals; March 26 – afternoon
16	(South Africa) Louis Oosthuizen	2&1
8	(United States) Dustin Johnson
52	(Spain) Rafa Cabrera-Bello	2&1
45	(United States) Ryan Moore
54	(United States) Chris Kirk
3	(Northern Ireland) Rory McIlroy	4&3
18	(United States) Brooks Koepka
2	(Australia) Jason Day	3&2

Semifinals; March 27 – morning
16	(South Africa) Louis Oosthuizen	4&3
52	(Spain) Rafa Cabrera-Bello
3	(Northern Ireland) Rory McIlroy
2	(Australia) Jason Day	1up

Final; March 27 – afternoon
16	(South Africa) Louis Oosthuizen
2	(Australia) Jason Day	5&4
Third place
3	(Northern Ireland) Rory McIlroy
52	(Spain) Rafa Cabrera-Bello	3&2

Notes: Round of 16

There were three upsets: #1 Jordan Spieth lost to #16 Louis Oosthuizen, 4 & 2; #52 Rafa Cabrera-Bello won when #27 An Byeong-hun conceded the match after 12 holes due to a neck injury (Cabrera-Bello was leading 4 up); #54 Chris Kirk defeated #30 Bill Haas, 2 & 1. Three of the top-8 seeds remained. Spieth's loss means that Day regains the world number one position.

Quarterfinals

There were two upsets: #16 Oosthuizen defeated #8 Dustin Johnson, 2 & 1, and #52 Cabrera-Bello defeated #45 Ryan Moore, 2 & 1. None of the 11 Americans in the round of 16 made the semifinals.

== Prize money breakdown ==
Place	Description	US ($)
1	Champion	1,620,000
2	Runner-up	1,180,000
3	Third place	660,000
4	Fourth place	530,000
T5	Losing quarter-finalists x 4	290,000
T9	Losing round of 16 x 8	152,000
17	Those with 2.5 points in pool play x 1	112,000
T18	Those with 2 points in pool play x 10	90,900
T28	Those with 1.5 points in pool play x 10	74,500
T38	Those with 1 point in pool play x 13	63,000
T51	Those with 0.5 points in pool play x 10	52,000
T61	Those with 0 points in pool play x 4	47,750
	Total	9,500,000
