= MTC Namibia PGA Championship =

Tournament information
- Location: Windhoek, Namibia
- Established: 2004
- Course: Windhoek Country Club
- Par: 71
- Length: 7,187 yards (6,572 m)
- Tour: Sunshine Tour
- Format: Stroke play
- Prize fund: R 1,200,000
- Month played: November
- Final year: 2011

Tournament record score
- Aggregate: 54 holes: 195 Keith Horne (2008); 72 holes: 268 J. G. Claassen (2011)
- To par: 54 holes: −18 as above 72 holes: −16 as above

Final champion
- (South Africa) J. G. Claassen

Location map
- Location in Namibia

The MTC Namibia PGA Championship was a golf tournament on the Sunshine Tour. It was founded in 2004, the year after the PGA of Namibia was formed, and played at the Windhoek Country Club, to the south of Windhoek, Namibia until 2009 when it moved to Rossmund Golf Club in Swakopmund. After not being played in 2010, it moved back to Windhoek in 2011.

In 2008, the event was played over 72 holes for the first time, having previously been contested over just three rounds, with a prize fund of 1 million rand, making it the richest event on the winter swing of the tour.

== Winners ==
Year	Winner	Score	To par	Margin of victory	Runner(s)-up
2011	(South Africa) J. G. Claassen	268	−16	1 stroke	(South Africa) Christiaan Basson
2010: No tournament
2009	(South Africa) Hennie Otto	280	−8	Playoff	(South Africa) Titch Moore
2008	(Zimbabwe) Tongoona Charamba	270	−14	Playoff	(South Africa) Merrick Bremner (South Africa) Nic Henning
2007	(South Africa) Keith Horne	195	−18	5 strokes	(Scotland) Doug McGuigan (South Africa) Hennie Otto (South Africa) Ulrich van den Berg
2006	(South Africa) Anton Haig	196	−17	1 stroke	(South Africa) Thomas Aiken
2005	(South Africa) Thomas Aiken	198	−15	4 strokes	(South Africa) Michiel Bothma (Zimbabwe) Sean Farrell (South Africa) Werner Geyer (South Africa) Keith Horne
2004	(South Africa) Mark Murless	202	−11	2 strokes	(South Africa) Bradley Davison (Zimbabwe) Sean Farrell
