= Telkom PGA Pro-Am =

Tournament information
- Location: Tshwane, South Africa
- Established: 2005
- Course: Centurion Country Club
- Par: 72
- Length: 7,238 yards (6,618 m)
- Tour: Sunshine Tour
- Format: Stroke play
- Prize fund: R 600,000
- Month played: January
- Final year: 2013

Tournament record score
- Aggregate: 196 Oliver Bekker (2013)
- To par: −20 as above

Final champion
- (South Africa) Oliver Bekker
- Location in South Africa Location in Gauteng

The Telkom PGA Pro-Am was a golf tournament on the Sunshine Tour. It was founded in 2005 and is played at the Centurion Country Club in Tshwane, South Africa.

== Winners ==
Year	Winner	Score	To par	Margin of victory	Runner(s)-up	Ref.
2013	(South Africa) Oliver Bekker	196	−20	2 strokes	(South Africa) PH McIntyre (South Africa) Ryan Strauss	
2012: No tournament
2011	(South Africa) Jaco van Zyl (3)	197	−19	6 strokes	(South Africa) Jean Hugo	
2010	(South Africa) Jaco van Zyl (2)	201	−15	1 stroke	(South Africa) Garth Mulroy	
2009	(South Africa) Jaco van Zyl	204	−12	5 strokes	(Zimbabwe) Tongoona Charamba	
2008	(South Africa) Merrick Bremner	200	−16	3 strokes	(South Africa) Kevin Stone	
2007	(South Africa) Michiel Bothma	204	−12	1 stroke	(South Africa) Jaco van Zyl	
2006	(Scotland) Doug McGuigan	205	−11	2 strokes	(South Africa) Desvonde Botes (South Africa) Hennie Otto	
2005	(South Africa) Thomas Aiken	201	−15	6 strokes	(South Africa) Henk Alberts	
