= Piemonte Open =

Piemonte Open may refer to:

- Piemonte Open (golf)
- Piemonte Open (tennis)
