= Bassoon (disambiguation) =

Bassoon refers to a musical instrument.

Bassoon may also refer to:

- Bassoon, a three-stage thermonuclear device tested as the Zuni shot of Operation Redwing
- Bassoon Prime, a three-stage thermonuclear device tested as the Tewa shot of Operation Redwing
- Christiaan Basson, a South African golfer
