= KCB Karen Masters =

Coordinates: 1.341°S 36.715°E

Tournament information
- Location: Karen, Kenya
- Established: 2017
- Course: Karen Country Club
- Par: 72
- Length: 7,022 yards (6,421 m)
- Tour: Sunshine Tour
- Format: Stroke play
- Prize fund: R 2,200,000
- Month played: June

Tournament record score
- Aggregate: 262 Toto Thimba Jr. (2019)
- To par: −26 as above

Final champion
- (South Africa) Toto Thimba Jr.
- Location in Kenya

The KCB Karen Masters was a golf tournament on the Sunshine Tour.

It was first played in March 2017 as a 36-hole event. It was won by Wil Besseling, claiming the first prize of US$4,000. In 2018 it became a Sunshine Tour event. It is held at Karen Country Club, south-west of Nairobi, Kenya. It is sponsored by Kenya Commercial Bank.

== Winners ==
Year	Tour (Note: AFR − Sunshine Tour.)	Winner	Score	To par	Margin of victory	Runner-up
Karen Masters
2021	AFR	No tournament due to the COVID-19 pandemic				
KCB Karen Masters
2020	AFR	No tournament due to the COVID-19 pandemic				
2019	AFR	(South Africa) Toto Thimba Jr.	262	−26	3 strokes	(Portugal) Stephen Ferreira
2018	AFR	(South Africa) Michael Palmer	270	−18	2 strokes	(South Africa) Merrick Bremner
2017		(Netherlands) Wil Besseling	132	−12	2 strokes	(Netherlands) Reinier Saxton
