= BMG Classic =

Tournament information
- Location: Edenvale, Gauteng, South Africa
- Established: 2008
- Course: Glendower Golf Club
- Par: 72
- Length: 7,564 yards (6,917 m)
- Tour: Sunshine Tour
- Format: Stroke play
- Prize fund: R 800,000
- Month played: October
- Final year: 2014

Tournament record score
- Aggregate: 201 Ulrich van den Berg (2013)
- To par: −15 as above

Final champion
- (South Africa) Merrick Bremner

Location map
- Location in South Africa Location in Gauteng

The BMG Classic was a golf tournament on the Southern Africa based Sunshine Tour. It was founded in 2008 after title sponsors Bearing Man Group ended their long-standing relationship with the Highveld Classic.

== Winners ==
Year	Winner	Score	To par	Margin of victory	Runner(s)-up	Venue
2014	(South Africa) Merrick Bremner	204	−12	1 stroke	(South Africa) Darren Fichardt	Glendower
2013	(South Africa) Ulrich van den Berg	201	−15	5 strokes	(South Africa) Titch Moore (South Africa) Hennie Otto	Glendower
2012	(South Africa) Teboho Sefatsa	206	−10	1 stroke	(South Africa) Merrick Bremner	Glendower
2011	(South Africa) James Kamte	207	−9	Playoff	(South Africa) Dawie van der Walt	Glendower
2010	(South Africa) Brandon Pieters	205	−11	Playoff	(England) Ben Mannix	Glendower
2009	(Canada) Graham DeLaet	205	−11	1 stroke	(England) Jeff Inglis	Glendower
2008	(South Africa) Doug McGuigan	206	−10	1 stroke	(South Africa) Jaco van Zyl	Ebotse
