= Coca-Cola Charity Championship =

Golf tournament in Western Cape, South Africa

Tournament information
- Location: Garden Route District Municipality, Western Cape, South Africa
- Established: 2006
- Course: Fancourt Links
- Par: 72
- Length: 7,342 yards (6,714 m)
- Tour: Sunshine Tour
- Format: Stroke play
- Prize fund: R 550,000
- Month played: November
- Final year: 2010

Tournament record score
- Aggregate: 197 Garth Mulroy (2008)
- To par: −19 as above

Final champion
- (South Africa) Branden Grace

Location map
- Location in South Africa Location in Western Cape

The Coca-Cola Charity Championship was a golf tournament on the Sunshine Tour. It was founded in 2006 as a finale to the tour's "Winter Swing", and was last played over the Gary Player-designed Outeniqua course at the Fancourt Hotel and Country Club, near George, Western Cape, South Africa.

== Winners ==
Year	Winner	Score	To par	Margin of victory	Runners-up
2010	(South Africa) Branden Grace	209	−7	2 strokes	(South Africa) Ulrich van den Berg (South Africa) Justin Walters
2009	(South Africa) Christiaan Basson	203	−13	4 strokes	(South Africa) Andrew Curlewis (South Africa) Louis Oosthuizen
2008	(South Africa) Garth Mulroy	197	−19	7 strokes	(South Africa) James Kamte (South Africa) Chris Williams
2007	(South Africa) Titch Moore	211	−5	4 strokes	(South Africa) Steve Basson (South Africa) James Kingston (South Africa) Louis Oosthuizen
2006	(South Africa) Alan Michell	200	−16	8 strokes	(Brazil) Adilson da Silva (Scotland) Doug McGuigan
