= J. G. Claassen =

South African golfer

Personal information
- Nationality: South Africa
- Born: 28 February 1991 (age 35) Klerksdorp, South Africa
- Height: 1.80 m (5 ft 11 in)
- Weight: 82 kg (181 lb; 12.9 st)

Career
- Sport: Golf
- Status: Professional
- Current tour: Sunshine Tour
- Professional wins: 1

Number of wins by tour
- Sunshine Tour: 1

J. G. Claassen (born 28 February 1991) is a South African professional golfer.

== Professional career ==
Claassen plays on the Sunshine Tour where he has one win, the 2011 MTC Namibia PGA Championship.

== Professional wins (1) ==
=== Sunshine Tour wins (1) ===
No.	Date	Tournament	Winning score	Margin of victory	Runner-up
1	20 Mar 2011	MTC Namibia PGA Championship	−16 (69-67-67-65=268)	1 stroke	(South Africa) Christiaan Basson

== Team appearances ==
Amateur

- Eisenhower Trophy (representing South Africa): 2010
