= Lombard Insurance Classic =

Tournament information
- Location: Hermanus, Western Cape, South Africa
- Established: 2007
- Course: Arabella Country Club
- Par: 72
- Length: 6,805 yards (6,222 m)
- Tour: Sunshine Tour
- Format: Stroke play
- Prize fund: R 1,200,000
- Month played: May
- Final year: 2022

Tournament record score
- Aggregate: 193 Dean Burmester (2015)
- To par: −23 as above

Final champion
- (South Africa) Herman Loubser
- Location in South Africa Location in Western Cape

The Lombard Insurance Classic was a golf tournament on the Sunshine Tour. It was played between 2007 and 2022, usually at the Royal Swazi Spa Country Club in Ezulwini Valley, Eswatini.

== Winners ==
Year	Winner	Score	To par	Margin of victory	Runner(s)-up
2022	(South Africa) Herman Loubser	209	−7	Playoff	(South Africa) Ockie Strydom
2021–22: No tournament
2020	No tournament due to the COVID-19 pandemic				
2019	(South Africa) Jake Redman	196	−20	1 stroke	(South Africa) Thriston Lawrence (South Africa) Toto Thimba Jr.
2018	(South Africa) Justin Harding (2)	196	−20	Playoff	(South Africa) Jake Roos
2017	(South Africa) Oliver Bekker	197	−19	Playoff	(South Africa) Justin Harding
2016	(South Africa) Merrick Bremner (3)	197	−19	Playoff	(South Africa) CJ du Plessis
2015	(South Africa) Dean Burmester	193	−23	5 strokes	(South Africa) Keith Horne (South Africa) Peter Karmis
2014	(South Africa) Christiaan Basson	197	−19	5 strokes	(Brazil) Adilson da Silva (South Africa) Ruan de Smidt (South Africa) Jake Redman (South Africa) Neil Schietekat
2013	(South Africa) Merrick Bremner (2)	199	−17	2 strokes	(South Africa) PH McIntyre
2012	(South Africa) Jake Roos	199	−17	Playoff	(South Africa) Justin Harding
2011	(South Africa) Justin Harding	202	−14	1 stroke	(England) Neil Cheetham
2010	(South Africa) Grant Muller	201	−15	Playoff	(Zimbabwe) Tongoona Charamba
2009	(South Africa) Peter Karmis (2)	198	−18	4 strokes	(South Africa) Jaco van Zyl
2008	(South Africa) Merrick Bremner	198	−18	1 stroke	(South Africa) Dean Lambert (South Africa) Jaco van Zyl
2007	(South Africa) Peter Karmis	200	−16	1 stroke	(Zimbabwe) Tongoona Charamba
