= Rafa Cabrera-Bello =

Spanish professional golfer

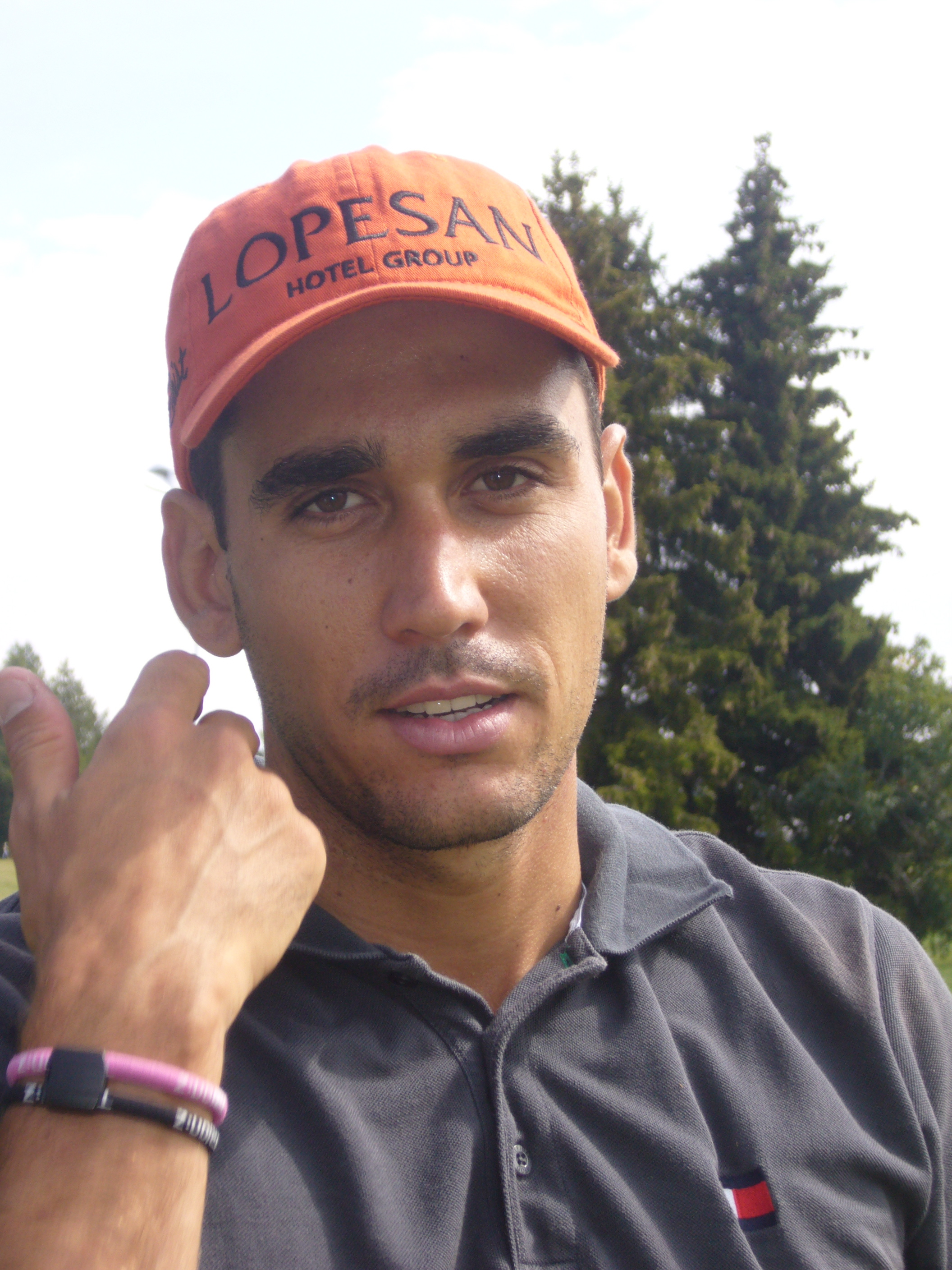

Personal information
- Full name: Rafael Cabrera-Bello
- Nationality: Spain
- Born: 25 May 1984 (age 42) Las Palmas, Gran Canaria, Spain
- Height: 1.87 m (6 ft 2 in)
- Weight: 81 kg (179 lb; 12.8 st)

Career
- Sport: Golf
- Turned professional: 2005
- Current tour: European Tour
- Former tours: PGA Tour; Challenge Tour
- Professional wins: 7
- Highest ranking: 16 (23 July 2017)

Number of wins by tour
- European Tour: 4
- Challenge Tour: 2
- Other: 1

Best results in major championships
- Masters Tournament: T17: 2016
- PGA Championship: T10: 2018
- U.S. Open: T23: 2020
- The Open Championship: T4: 2017
Medal record
Mediterranean Games
| Silver medal – second place | 2001 Tunis | Men's team |

Rafael Cabrera-Bello (born 25 May 1984) is a Spanish professional golfer who plays on the European Tour, where he has won four times. He has also played on the PGA Tour.

== Early life ==
Cabrera-Bello was born in Las Palmas, Gran Canaria. He first played golf aged six and went on to enjoy a successful amateur career, winning the Spanish National Championship at every age group level from under-7 through under-18. In 2002, as a 17-year-old amateur, he finished in a tie for fourth at the Canarias Open de España, a European Tour event. He was a student at the American School of Las Palmas.

His sister Emma Cabrera-Bello is also a professional golfer playing on the Ladies European Tour (LET) and sitting on the LET Board of Directors.

== Professional career ==
Cabrera-Bello turned professional at the age of 20 in 2005, having narrowly missed out obtaining a European Tour card at final qualifying school. His performance did ensure a place for the second-tier Challenge Tour.

In a successful first season, Cabrera-Bello recorded his maiden professional victory, at the MAN NÖ Open in Austria. He finished the season 13th on the Challenge Tour rankings, earning him a place on the following year's European Tour.

He struggled during his rookie season in 2007, failing to finish better than tied for 18th in any tournament as he finished outside the top 200 on the Order of Merit. He failed to regain his playing status at the end of season qualifying school and returned to the Challenge Tour for 2008. His second professional victory came in the 2008 Credit Suisse Challenge, and he ended the year by once again earning graduation to the main tour, finishing 14th in the rankings.

Cabrera-Bello's second season of European Tour golf proved far more successful. In his first eleven events, he missed only one cut, finishing in the top-10 on four occasions and the top-20 a further five times. After such a promising start to the season he suffered a slump in form, making only 2 of his next 10 cuts. However, he bounced back in dramatic style at the Austrian Golf Open in September. Lying nine shots off the lead after the first two rounds, he recorded a third-round 66 to move up the leaderboard, before firing a record-equalling 11-under-par final round of 60 to claim victory by one shot ahead of Benn Barham, who had led for the entire tournament. His performance equalled the record for any round on the European Tour, and was only the third time a player had carded a final round 60 to win a tour event.

His 2010 and 2011 seasons on the European Tour did not result in any victories, but a second place in the 2011 Portugal Masters and three more top-10 placements in the same year helped him to reach the 30th place in the final Order of Merit.

In 2012, he claimed the biggest win of his career at the Omega Dubai Desert Classic against a field containing three of the world's top four. The win also earned him the 60th place in the Official World Golf Ranking, his first time in the top 100.

Despite some notable results, like the second places at the 2014 BMW International Open and the 2015 Lyoness Open, Cabrera-Bello position in the World Rankings did not improve between 2013 and 2015. He eventually found an excellent period of form between January and February 2016, when he registered consecutive second places at the 2016 Commercial Bank Qatar Masters and 2016 Omega Dubai Desert Classic. A month later, he went on to finish third at the 2016 WGC-Dell Match Play, rising to 36th in the Official World Golf Ranking and as a result, qualifying for the first time for the 2016 Masters Tournament. He followed with a top-5 finish in the Shell Houston Open and earned Special Temporary Member status on the PGA Tour for the remainder of the 2015–16 season, which he managed to convert to full membership at the end of the year by earning more than the 125th player on the Official Money List.

In August 2016, Cabrera-Bello represented Spain in the 2016 Summer Olympics, finishing tied for 5th place. His performances in 2015 and 2016 also earned him an automatic selection for the 2016 Ryder Cup.

Cabrera-Bello recorded an albatross in the fourth round of the 2017 Players Championship. In July 2017, Cabrero-Bello had his first European Tour win since 2012, winning the Aberdeen Asset Management Scottish Open after defeating Callum Shinkwin in a play-off on the 18th hole at Dundonald Links, Irvine, after both players had finished on 13 under par.

In 2021, Cabrera-Bello recorded his first victory in four years in his home country at the Acciona Open de España. He beat Adri Arnaus in a playoff.

== Professional wins (7) ==
=== European Tour wins (4) ===
Legend
Rolex Series (1)
Other European Tour (3)

| No. | Date | Tournament | Winning score | Margin of victory | Runner(s)-up |
|---|---|---|---|---|---|
| 1 | 20 Sep 2009 | Austrian Golf Open | −20 (71-67-66-60=264) | 1 stroke | (England) Benn Barham |
| 2 | 12 Feb 2012 | Omega Dubai Desert Classic | −18 (63-69-70-68=270) | 1 stroke | (Scotland) Stephen Gallacher, (England) Lee Westwood |
| 3 | 16 Jul 2017 | Aberdeen Asset Management Scottish Open | −13 (70-72-69-64=275) | Playoff | (England) Callum Shinkwin |
| 4 | 10 Oct 2021 | Acciona Open de España | −19 (67-65-64-69=265) | Playoff | (Spain) Adri Arnaus |

European Tour playoff record (2–1)

| No. | Year | Tournament | Opponent(s) | Result |
|---|---|---|---|---|
| 1 | 2014 | BMW International Open | (France) Grégory Havret, (Sweden) Henrik Stenson, (Paraguay) Fabrizio Zanotti | Zanotti won with par on fifth extra hole Cabrera-Bello eliminated by par on fourth hole Havret eliminated by birdie on second hole |
| 2 | 2017 | Aberdeen Asset Management Scottish Open | (England) Callum Shinkwin | Won with birdie on first extra hole |
| 3 | 2021 | Acciona Open de España | (Spain) Adri Arnaus | Won with birdie on first extra hole |

=== Challenge Tour wins (2) ===
| No. | Date | Tournament | Winning score | Margin of victory | Runner-up |
|---|---|---|---|---|---|
| 1 | 23 Jul 2006 | MAN NÖ Open | −16 (61-68-66-69=264) | 2 strokes | (Austria) Niki Zitny |
| 2 | 13 Jul 2008 | Credit Suisse Challenge | −25 (67-64-68-68=267) | 2 strokes | (England) Gary Lockerbie |

Challenge Tour playoff record (0–1)

| No. | Year | Tournament | Opponents | Result |
|---|---|---|---|---|
| 1 | 2008 | Ypsilon Golf Challenge | (England) Seve Benson, (South Africa) Branden Grace | Benson won with birdie on third extra hole Grace eliminated by birdie on second hole |

=== Other wins (1) ===
- 2005 Canarias Professional Championship (as an amateur)

== Results in major championships ==
Results not in chronological order in 2020.

| Tournament | 2010 | 2011 | 2012 | 2013 | 2014 | 2015 | 2016 | 2017 | 2018 |
|---|---|---|---|---|---|---|---|---|---|
| Masters Tournament | | | | | | | T17 | CUT | T38 |
| U.S. Open | T47 | | CUT | | | | T32 | T42 | T36 |
| The Open Championship | | | T81 | T21 | CUT | T40 | T39 | T4 | 74 |
| PGA Championship | | | CUT | T29 | 73 | CUT | T49 | CUT | T10 |

| Tournament | 2019 | 2020 | 2021 |
|---|---|---|---|
| Masters Tournament | T36 | T51 | |
| PGA Championship | T71 | CUT | |
| U.S. Open | T65 | T23 | T50 |
| The Open Championship | CUT | NT | CUT |

Top 10
Did not play

CUT = missed the half way cut
"T" indicates a tie for a place.
NT = No tournament due to COVID-19 pandemic

=== Summary ===
| Tournament | Wins | 2nd | 3rd | Top-5 | Top-10 | Top-25 | Events | Cuts made |
|---|---|---|---|---|---|---|---|---|
| Masters Tournament | 0 | 0 | 0 | 0 | 0 | 1 | 5 | 4 |
| PGA Championship | 0 | 0 | 0 | 0 | 1 | 1 | 9 | 5 |
| U.S. Open | 0 | 0 | 0 | 0 | 0 | 1 | 8 | 7 |
| The Open Championship | 0 | 0 | 0 | 1 | 1 | 2 | 9 | 6 |
| Totals | 0 | 0 | 0 | 1 | 2 | 5 | 31 | 22 |

- Most consecutive cuts made – 7 (2018 Masters – 2019 U.S. Open)
- Longest streak of top-10s – 1 (twice)

== Results in The Players Championship ==
| Tournament | 2016 | 2017 | 2018 | 2019 |
|---|---|---|---|---|
| The Players Championship | CUT | T4 | T17 | CUT |

Top 10

CUT = missed the halfway cut
"T" indicates a tie for a place

== Results in World Golf Championships ==
Results not in chronological order before 2015.

| Tournament | 2012 | 2013 | 2014 | 2015 | 2016 | 2017 | 2018 | 2019 | 2020 | 2021 |
|---|---|---|---|---|---|---|---|---|---|---|
| Championship | 65 | T63 | | | T11 | T38 | T3 | T19 | T16 | T59 |
| Match Play | R64 | R32 | | | 3 | T17 | T36 | T24 | NT^{1} | |
| Invitational | T29 | | | | | 72 | T17 | T12 | 78 | |
| Champions | T46 | | | | T19 | T5 | T14 | T57 | NT^{1} | NT^{1} |

^{1}Cancelled due to COVID-19 pandemic

Top 10
Did not play

QF, R16, R32, R64 = Round in which player lost in match play
NT = no tournament
"T" = tied

== Team appearances ==
Amateur

- Junior Ryder Cup (representing Europe): 1999 (winners)
- Jacques Léglise Trophy (representing Continental Europe): 2000, 2001 (winners), 2002
- Eisenhower Trophy (representing Spain): 2000, 2004
- European Boys' Team Championship (representing Spain): 2001, 2002 (winners)
- European Amateur Team Championship (representing Spain): 2001, 2005
- European Youths' Team Championship (representing Spain): 2004

Professional

- World Cup (representing Spain): 2013, 2016
- Ryder Cup (representing Europe): 2016
- EurAsia Cup (representing Europe): 2018 (winners)

== See also ==
- 2006 Challenge Tour graduates
- 2008 Challenge Tour graduates
