= Dawie van der Walt =

South African professional golfer

Personal information
- Full name: Isak Dawid van der Walt
- Nationality: South Africa
- Born: 11 February 1983 (age 43) Paarl, South Africa
- Height: 1.93 m (6 ft 4 in)
- Weight: 118 kg (260 lb; 18.6 st)
- Spouse: Bobbie Jo van der Walt
- Children: 2

Career
- Sport: Golf
- College: Lamar University
- Turned professional: 2007
- Current tour: PGA Tour
- Former tours: Korn Ferry Tour; European Tour; Sunshine Tour
- Professional wins: 8

Number of wins by tour
- European Tour: 2
- Sunshine Tour: 2
- Korn Ferry Tour: 2
- Other: 4

Best results in major championships
- Masters Tournament: DNP
- PGA Championship: DNP
- U.S. Open: DNP
- The Open Championship: CUT: 2014

Achievements and awards
- Sunshine Tour Order of Merit winner: 2013

Isak Dawid "Dawie" van der Walt (born 11 February 1983) is a South African professional golfer. He won twice on the European Tour in 2013, both times in South Africa, and won twice on the Web.com Tour in 2015. He currently plays on the PGA Tour.

== Amateur career ==
Van der Walt was born in Paarl, South Africa. He played college golf at Lamar University in the United States, graduating in 2007. He represented South Africa in the 2004 and 2006 Eisenhower Trophy events.

== Professional career ==
Van der Walt turned professional in 2007 and played on the Sunshine Tour and U.S. mini-tours since 2008. He won four mini-tour events between 2008 and 2011. His best finish on the Sunshine Tour Order of Merit was 18th in 2012. In 2011 and 2012, he also played on the Web.com Tour where his best finish was 2nd at the 2012 Cox Classic.

In 2013, van der Walt won the Tshwane Open, co-sanctioned by the Sunshine Tour and the European Tour.

Van der Walt's busy schedule for 2013 also included the Web.com Tour (where he tried to earn a PGA Tour card) and the European Tour, where he has status until 2015 provided he plays a minimum thirteen events a year. Van der Walt finished 52nd on the 2013 Web.com Tour money list and didn't make a cut during the Web.com Tour Finals.

Van der Walt earned his second win of 2013 at the Nelson Mandela Championship. Although he was not the Sunshine Tour's leading money winner, he was named the winner of the Order of Merit since Charl Schwartzel did not play enough events to be rated. The honour also earned him entry into the 2014 Open Championship, his first major. He was part of the longest playoff in Web.com Tour history during the 2014 Cleveland Open, losing to New Zealand's Steven Alker on the eleventh playoff hole.

After three runner-up finishes on the Web.com Tour, van der Walt finally earned his first tour win at the 2015 Chile Classic. He won the Price Cutter Charity Championship later in the season. The finished the season second in the money list and gained a place on the 2015–16 PGA Tour.

Van der Walt made the cut just 11 times in 25 events on the 2015–16 PGA Tour and lost his card, returning to the Web.com for 2017. His best finish since 2017 has been tied for third place in the 2019 TPC Colorado Championship.

In 2021, van der Walt earned his PGA Tour card for the 2021–22 PGA Tour season by finishing 17th in the Korn Ferry Tour Finals.

== Professional wins (8) ==
=== European Tour wins (2) ===
No.	Date	Tournament	Winning score	Margin of victory	Runner(s)-up
1	3 Mar 2013	Tshwane Open^{1}	−21 (68-65-67-67=267)	2 strokes	(South Africa) Darren Fichardt
2	14 Dec 2013 (2014 season)	Nelson Mandela Championship^{1}	−15 (67-62-66=195) (Note: Shortened to 54 holes due to weather.)	2 strokes	(England) Matthew Baldwin, (Spain) Jorge Campillo

^{1}Co-sanctioned by the Sunshine Tour

=== Sunshine Tour wins (2) ===
No.	Date	Tournament	Winning score	Margin of victory	Runner(s)-up
1	3 Mar 2013	Tshwane Open^{1}	−21 (68-65-67-67=267)	2 strokes	(South Africa) Darren Fichardt
2	14 Dec 2013	Nelson Mandela Championship^{1}	−15 (67-62-66=195)	2 strokes	(England) Matthew Baldwin, (Spain) Jorge Campillo

^{1}Co-sanctioned by the European Tour

Sunshine Tour playoff record (0–1)

No.	Year	Tournament	Opponent	Result
1	2011	BMG Classic	(South Africa) James Kamte	Lost to birdie on first extra hole

=== Web.com Tour wins (2) ===
No.	Date	Tournament	Winning score	Margin of victory	Runner-up
1	22 Mar 2015	Chile Classic	−21 (64-66-68-65=263)	2 strokes	(United States) Erik Barnes
2	16 Aug 2015	Price Cutter Charity Championship	−23 (63-65-65-72=265)	2 strokes	(United States) Smylie Kaufman

Web.com Tour playoff record (0–1)

No.	Year	Tournament	Opponent	Result
1	2014	Cleveland Open	(New Zealand) Steven Alker	Lost to birdie on eleventh extra hole

=== NGA Hooters Tour wins (1) ===
No.	Date	Tournament	Winning score	Margin of victory	Runner-up
1	27 Jul 2008	Onion Creek Classic	−17 (68-64-65-66=263)	Playoff	(United States) Emmett Turner

=== Adams Pro Golf Tour wins (3) ===
- 2008 Mary Bird Perkins Merrill Lynch Open
- 2009 Lake Charles Open
- 2011 Southwest Louisiana Lions Club Open

== Results in major championships ==
Tournament	2014
The Open Championship	CUT

CUT = missed the halfway cut
Note: van der Walt only played in The Open Championship.

== Results in World Golf Championships ==
Tournament	2014
Match Play	
Championship	65
Invitational	
Champions	T41

Did not play

"T" = Tied

== Team appearances ==
Amateur

- Eisenhower Trophy (representing South Africa): 2004, 2006

== See also ==
- 2015 Web.com Tour Finals graduates
- 2021 Korn Ferry Tour Finals graduates
