= Haydn Porteous =

South African professional golfer

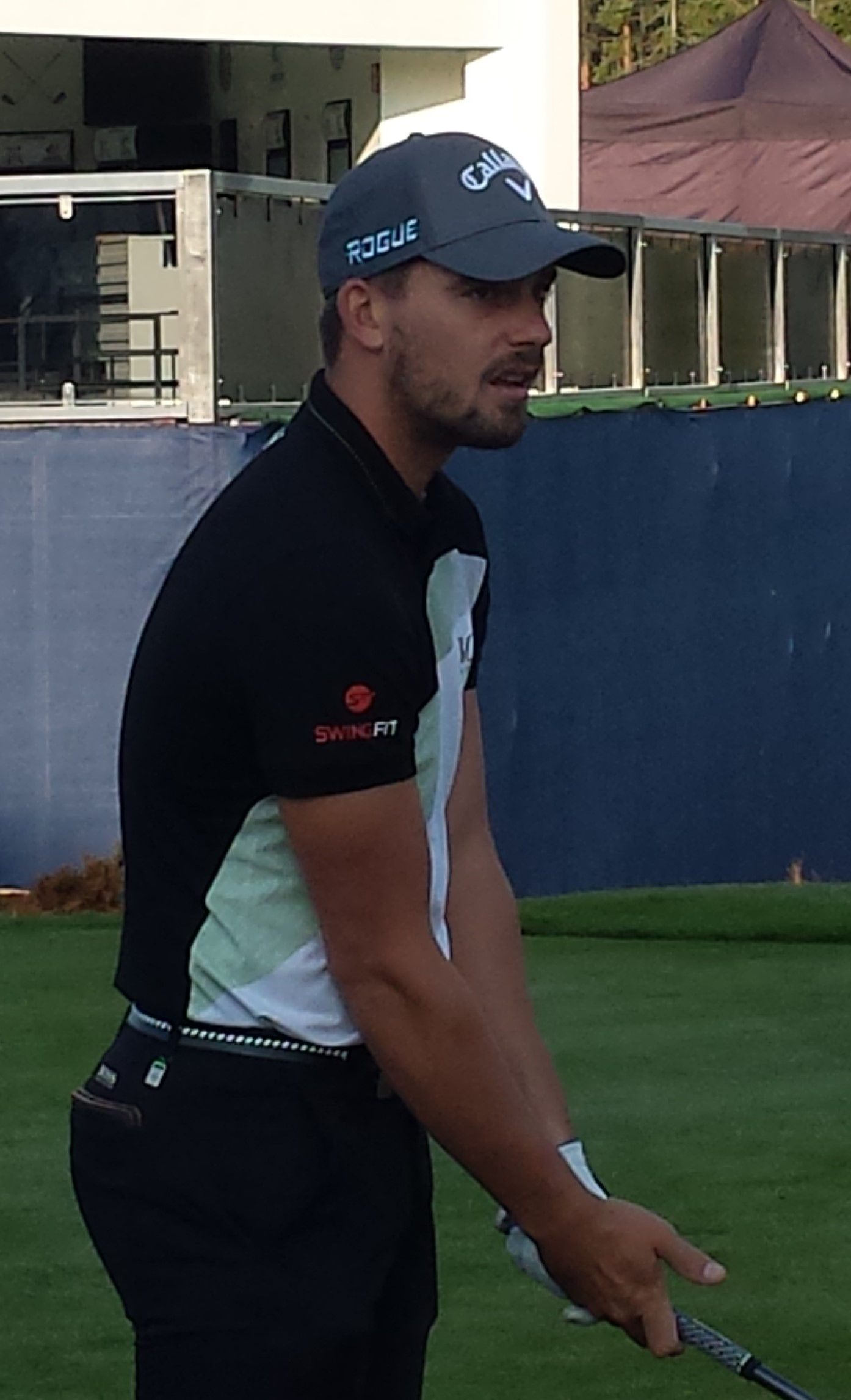
- Porteous at the 2018 Nordea Masters

Personal information
- Nationality: South Africa
- Born: 8 July 1994 (age 32)
- Height: 1.78 m (5 ft 10 in)
- Weight: 80 kg (180 lb; 13 st)

Career
- Sport: Golf
- Turned professional: 2013
- Current tour: Sunshine Tour
- Former tours: European Tour; Challenge Tour; Big Easy Tour
- Professional wins: 6

Number of wins by tour
- European Tour: 2
- Sunshine Tour: 3
- Challenge Tour: 1
- Other: 1

Best results in major championships
- Masters Tournament: DNP
- PGA Championship: DNP
- U.S. Open: DNP
- The Open Championship: T30: 2016

Achievements and awards
- Sunshine Tour Rookie of the Year: 2014

Haydn Porteous (born 8 July 1994) is a South African professional golfer.

== Amateur career ==
Porteous won many amateur tournaments in South Africa, including the South African Stroke Play in 2012 and 2013. He represented his country, together with Zander Lombard and Brandon Stone, at the 2012 Eisenhower Trophy in Antalya, Turkey.

He was the top-ranked South African amateur player when he turned professional in 2013.

== Professional career ==
Porteous has played on the Sunshine Tour and the Challenge Tour. He won the 2015 Barclays Kenya Open on the Challenge Tour.

In January 2016, Porteous won his maiden European Tour title with a two-stroke victory on home soil at the Joburg Open. This was a co-sanctioned event with the Sunshine Tour. Following Brandon Stone's win the previous week, Porteous' win was the second consecutive European Tour win by a South African first-time winner.

In January 2018, Porteous reached a career best 166th in the Official World Golf Ranking.

== Amateur wins ==
- 2010 Free State and Northern Cape Open
- 2011 Boland Open
- 2012 South African Stroke Play, Boland Open Amateur, KwaZulu Natal Amateur, Limpopo Open, Harry Oppenheimer Trophy
- 2013 Prince's Grant Invitational, South African Stroke Play, Sanlam Cape Province Open, Boland Amateur Open

== Professional wins (6) ==
=== European Tour wins (2) ===
No.	Date	Tournament	Winning score	Margin of victory	Runner-up
1	17 Jan 2016	Joburg Open^{1}	−18 (66-66-68-69=269)	2 strokes	(South Africa) Zander Lombard
2	3 Sep 2017	D+D Real Czech Masters	−13 (70-69-67-69=275)	2 strokes	(England) Lee Slattery

^{1}Co-sanctioned by the Sunshine Tour

=== Sunshine Tour wins (3) ===
No.	Date	Tournament	Winning score	Margin of victory	Runner(s)-up
1	17 Jan 2016	Joburg Open^{1}	−18 (66-66-68-69=269)	2 strokes	(South Africa) Zander Lombard
2	12 Mar 2016	Investec Cup	−12 (69-68-68-71=276)	1 stroke	(South Africa) Brandon Stone
3	14 Sep 2025	Vodacom Origins of Golf at Gowrie Farm	−7 (66-69=135) (Note: Shortened to 36 holes due to weather.)	1 stroke	(Australia) Austin Bautista, (South Africa) Estiaan Conradie, (South Africa) Luke Jerling, (Germany) Allen John, (South Africa) Herman Loubser, (South Africa) Kyle McClatchie, (South Africa) Daniel van Tonder

^{1}Co-sanctioned by the European Tour

Sunshine Tour playoff record (0–1)

No.	Year	Tournament	Opponents	Result
1	2014	Vodacom Origins of Golf at Wild Coast	(South Africa) Jaco Ahlers, (South Africa) Louis de Jager	de Jager won with par on first extra hole

=== Challenge Tour wins (1) ===
No.	Date	Tournament	Winning score	Margin of victory	Runner-up
1	12 Apr 2015	Barclays Kenya Open	−17 (66-65-72-68=271)	Playoff	(South Africa) Brandon Stone

Challenge Tour playoff record (1–0)

No.	Year	Tournament	Opponent	Result
1	2015	Barclays Kenya Open	(South Africa) Brandon Stone	Won with eagle on first extra hole

=== IGT Pro Tour wins (1) ===
No.	Date	Tournament	Winning score	Margin of victory	Runner-up
1	10 Jul 2013	Winter Challenge Houghton GC (as an amateur)	−5 (67-70-74=211)	8 strokes	(South Africa) Coert Groenewald

== Results in major championships ==
Tournament	2016
Masters Tournament	
U.S. Open	
The Open Championship	T30
PGA Championship	

Did not play

CUT = missed the half-way cut
"T" = tied

== Results in World Golf Championships ==
Tournament	2017
Championship	
Match Play	
Invitational	
Champions	T38

Did not play

"T" = Tied

== Team appearances ==
- Eisenhower Trophy (representing South Africa): 2012
