= Grant Muller =

South African professional golfer (born 1970)

Personal information
- Nationality: South Africa
- Born: 16 July 1970 (age 56) Johannesburg, South Africa
- Height: 1.70 m (5 ft 7 in)
- Weight: 65.77 kg (145.0 lb; 10.357 st)

Career
- Sport: Golf
- Turned professional: 1992
- Current tour: Sunshine Tour
- Professional wins: 5

Number of wins by tour
- Sunshine Tour: 2
- Other: 3

Best results in major championships
- Masters Tournament: DNP
- PGA Championship: DNP
- U.S. Open: DNP
- The Open Championship: CUT: 2004

Grant Muller (born 16 July 1970) is a South African professional golfer who plays on the Sunshine Tour.

== Career ==
In 1970, Muller was born in Johannesburg, South Africa.

In 1991, he turned professional and joined the Sunshine Tour the same year. He has won twice on the Sunshine Tour, with the first win coming in 1997 at the Vodacom Series: Kwazulu-Natal and the second in 2010 at the Lombard Insurance Classic. He has finished in the top-25 of the Sunshine Tour's Order of Merit four times (2000/01, 2001/02, 2004/05, 2010), with his best finish coming in 2001/02 when he finished in tenth.

== Professional wins (5) ==
=== Sunshine Tour wins (2) ===
| No. | Date | Tournament | Winning score | Margin of victory | Runner-up |
|---|---|---|---|---|---|
| 1 | 25 Oct 1997 | Vodacom Series (Kwazulu-Natal) | −5 (71-70-70=211) | 5 strokes | (South Africa) Hennie Otto |
| 2 | 6 Jun 2010 | Lombard Insurance Classic | −15 (71-63-67=201) | Playoff | (Zimbabwe) Tongoona Charamba |

Sunshine Tour playoff record (1–1)

| No. | Year | Tournament | Opponent | Result |
|---|---|---|---|---|
| 1 | 2005 | Platinum Classic | (South Africa) Jaco van Zyl | Lost to birdie on first extra hole |
| 2 | 2010 | Lombard Insurance Classic | (Zimbabwe) Tongoona Charamba | Won on third extra hole |

=== Other wins (3) ===
- 2002 3 wins (Diners Club Tour)

== Results in major championships ==
| Tournament | 2004 |
|---|---|
| The Open Championship | CUT |

Note: Muller only played in The Open Championship.
CUT = missed the half-way cut
