= Merrick Bremner =

South African professional golfer

Personal information
- Nationality: South Africa
- Born: 26 March 1986 (age 40) Durban, South Africa
- Height: 6 ft 0 in (1.83 m)
- Weight: 196 lb (89 kg; 14.0 st)

Career
- Sport: Golf
- Turned professional: 2005
- Current tour: Sunshine Tour
- Former tour: European Tour
- Professional wins: 13

Number of wins by tour
- Sunshine Tour: 8
- Other: 5

Best results in major championships
- Masters Tournament: DNP
- PGA Championship: DNP
- U.S. Open: CUT: 2019
- The Open Championship: DNP

Merrick Bremner (born 26 March 1986) is a South African professional golfer. He plays on the Sunshine Tour, where he has won eight times.

== Professional career ==
In 2012, Bremner led by two strokes after the first round of the SA Open Championship. He shot a course record 64 at Serengeti GC and eventually finished the tournament in a tie for 33rd after carding an 80 in the final round.

Bremner has also played on the European Tour where his best finish was T3 in the 2014 D+D Real Czech Masters.

Bremner played in his first major championship at the 2019 U.S. Open; he missed the halfway cut.

== Professional wins (13) ==
=== Sunshine Tour wins (8) ===
No.	Date	Tournament	Winning score	Margin of victory	Runner(s)-up
1	6 Aug 2008	Lombard Insurance Classic	−18 (67-65-66=198)	1 stroke	(South Africa) Dean Lambert, (South Africa) Jaco van Zyl
2	3 Sep 2008	Telkom PGA Pro-Am	−16 (63-70-67=200)	3 strokes	(South Africa) Kevin Stone
3	31 May 2013	Lombard Insurance Classic (2)	−17 (63-65-71=199)	2 strokes	(South Africa) PH McIntyre
4	19 Oct 2014	BMG Classic	−12 (66-71-67=204)	1 stroke	(South Africa) Darren Fichardt
5	22 May 2016	Lombard Insurance Classic (3)	−19 (68-66-63=197)	Playoff	(South Africa) CJ du Plessis
6	28 Sep 2019	Vodacom Origins of Golf at Humewood	−19 (65-65-67=197)	5 strokes	(Sweden) Jonathan Ågren, (South Africa) Ruan Conradie, (South Africa) Clinton Grobler
7	23 Oct 2020	Sun Wild Coast Sun Challenge	−8 (66-72-64=202)	1 stroke	(South Africa) Jacques Blaauw, (South Africa) Keenan Davidse
8	13 Aug 2022	Bain's Whisky Ubunye Championship (with (South Africa) Martin Rohwer)	−28 (60-66-62=188)	6 strokes	(South Africa) Hennie du Plessis and (South Africa) Jean Hugo, (South Africa) Erhard Lambrechts and (South Africa) Combrinck Smit

Sunshine Tour playoff record (1–1)

No.	Year	Tournament	Opponent(s)	Result
1	2008	MTC Namibia PGA Championship	(Zimbabwe) Tongoona Charamba, (South Africa) Nic Henning	Charamba won with birdie on third extra hole Henning eliminated by par on second hole
2	2016	Lombard Insurance Classic	(South Africa) CJ du Plessis	Won with par on fifth extra hole

=== IGT Pro Tour wins (5) ===
No.	Date	Tournament	Winning score	Margin of victory	Runner(s)-up
1	6 Mar 2012	#5 IGT Summer Series	−13 (66-69-68=203)	4 strokes	(Scotland) Doug McGuigan
2	22 May 2012	#13 IGT Winter Series	−15 (65-64=129)	13 strokes	(South Africa) Dean Lambert
3	16 Jul 2012	#21 IGT Serengeti Challenge	−5 (67)	Playoff	(South Africa) Allan Versfeld
4	5 Apr 2017	Waterkloof Challenge	−19 (66-63-68=197)	4 strokes	(South Africa) Matthew Spacey
5	12 Apr 2017	Kyalami Challenge	−15 (68-64-69=201)	2 strokes	(South Africa) Musiwalo Nethunzwi, (South Africa) Erik van Rooyen

== Results in major championships ==
Tournament	2019
Masters Tournament	
PGA Championship	
U.S. Open	CUT
The Open Championship	

Did not play

CUT = missed the halfway cut
