= Investec Cup =

Golf tournament

Tournament information
- Location: Koster, North West, South Africa
- Established: 2013
- Course: Millvale Private Retreat
- Par: 72
- Length: 7,480 yards (6,840 m)
- Tour: Sunshine Tour
- Format: Stroke play
- Prize fund: R 10,000,000
- Month played: March
- Final year: 2016

Tournament record score
- Aggregate: 267 Hennie Otto (2013); 267 Jaco van Zyl (2013)
- To par: −21 as above

Final champion
- (South Africa) Haydn Porteous
- Location in South Africa Location in North West

The Investec Cup was a golf tournament on the Sunshine Tour. It was played annually in March at Millvale Private Retreat in Koster, South Africa. Similar to the PGA Tour's Tour Championship, the Investec Cup had a 16-man field determined by the Chase to the Investec Cup standings. Points were earned in all Sunshine Tour events, beginning immediately after the previous Investec Cup. While the tournament's prize fund is a winner-take-all, R 250,000, a bonus pool of R 10,000,000 is distributed to the top finishers in the Chase, with the winner of the Chase taking R 4,000,000.

For the first three years, the tournament had a field of 30 players and was played over two courses, with the Millvale Private Retreat joined by the Lost City Golf Course in Sun City.

== Winners ==
Year	Winner	Score	To par	Margin of victory	Runner-up
2016	(South Africa) Haydn Porteous	276	−12	1 stroke	(South Africa) Brandon Stone
2015	(South Africa) Jaco Ahlers	279	−9	Playoff	(South Africa) Jaco van Zyl
2014	(South Africa) Trevor Fisher Jnr	272	−16	1 stroke	(South Africa) Jacques Blaauw
2013	(South Africa) Jaco van Zyl	267	−21	Playoff	(South Africa) Hennie Otto
