= Jayden Schaper =

South African professional golfer (born 2001)

Personal information
- Full name: Jayden Trey Schaper
- Nicknames: Clutch, The Shaper
- Nationality: South Africa
- Born: 15 March 2001 (age 25) Benoni, South Africa

Career
- Sport: Golf
- Turned professional: 2020
- Current tours: PGa Tour; European Tour; Sunshine Tour
- Former tour: Challenge Tour
- Professional wins: 2
- Highest ranking: 49 (1 February 2026) (as of 15 November 2026)

Number of wins by tour
- European Tour: 2
- Sunshine Tour: 2

Best results in major championships
- Masters Tournament: DNP
- PGA Championship: CUT: 2026
- U.S. Open: CUT: 2026
- The Open Championship: CUT: 2026

Achievements and awards
- Sunshine Tour Rookie of the Year: 2020–21, 2021–22

Jayden Trey Schaper (born 15 March 2001) is a South African professional golfer who plays on the European Tour, where he has won two tournaments.

Schaper had a successful amateur career, including a win at the 2019 Junior Players Championship. He turned professional in 2020 and was Sunshine Tour Rookie of the Year for 2020–21 and 2021–22. He won his first professional tournament in 2025 at the Alfred Dunhill Championship, and his second at the AfrAsia Bank Mauritius Open the following week.

== Early life and amateur career ==
Schaper was born on 15 March 2001, in Benoni, South Africa, to Yolande and Ryan Schaper. His father Ryan played football for the Jomo Cosmos F.C. during his youth and as of 2020 competed in cycling races such as Cape Epic.

Schaper home course was Ebotse Golf Estate, and he was coached by his father. Beginning in 2016 he also received coaching from former Sunshine Tour player Grant Veenstra.

By age 15, Schaper became the top-ranked junior golfer in South Africa. In 2017, he won both the South African Boys U17 Stroke Play Championship and the South African Boys U19 Championship, to become the first player to win the "grand slam" of junior titles in South Africa, having previously won the U13 and U15 championships.

In 2019, Schaper won the South African Stroke Play Championship. He shot a 63 in the second round, which was the course record at De Zalze Golf Club. Also that year, Schaper won the Junior Players Championship at TPC Sawgrass in the United States, and the All Africa Team Championship in Mauritius. He became the top-ranked South African amateur in March 2019. Schaper won the Bobby Locke Open in November 2019, which was his fourth win in his previous five starts. The win moved him to 85th in the World Amateur Golf Ranking.

Schaper was on the SA National Team and represented his country at the 2017 Junior Golf World Cup in Japan, and played on the International Team in the 2017 and 2019 Junior Presidents Cup.

In January 2020, Schaper tied for sixth at the South African Open, the best amateur finish in the tournament since Ernie Els in 1989. He subsequently moved to 38th in the World Amateur Golf Ranking.

== Professional career ==
Schaper turned professional at age 18, following the Omega Dubai Desert Classic in January 2020. He signed with Modest! Golf Management, owned by Niall Horan. He joined the Sunshine Tour, where he finished runner-up at the Alfred Dunhill Championship in December, and won the Rookie of the Year award back-to-back in 2020–21 and 2021–22.

In 2021, Schaper also joined the Challenge Tour, and in 2023 the European Tour, where he tied for 16th at the Barbasol Championship in Kentucky, a PGA Tour co-sanctioned event.

In the 2024 season, Schaper finished top-10 in all four European Tour and Sunshine Tour co-sanctioned events. He shared the lead heading into the final round of the South African Open, and eventually finished tied 5th after a final round 74.

In December 2025, Schaper shot a final-round 68 to finish runner-up at the Nedbank Golf Challenge, one stroke behind Kristoffer Reitan. The following week, Schaper recorded his first professional victory at the Alfred Dunhill Championship. He made eagle on the first playoff hole to defeat defending champion Shaun Norris. Schaper won his second European Tour title at the AfrAsia Bank Mauritius Open, held the next week. He shot a final-round 64 to force a playoff with Ryan Gerard. Schaper won on the second playoff hole with a chip-in eagle.

== Personal life ==
Schaper is a Christian. He stated after winning his first tournament on the European Tour in 2025: "It's a dream come true and it's prayers answered. I just want to thank my Lord and saviour Jesus Christ, there's only one reason I'm out here."

== Amateur wins ==
- 2017 South African Boys U19 Championship, Dimension Data Junior Open, South African Boys U17 Stroke Play Championship
- 2018 North and South Championship
- 2019 Region 5 International Championship, Western Province Amateur Strokeplay Championship, Junior Players Championship, Ekurhuleni Open, All Africa Team Championship, The Bobby Locke Open

== Professional wins (2) ==
=== European Tour wins (2) ===
No.	Date	Tournament	Winning score	Margin of victory	Runner-up
1	14 Dec 2025 (2026 season)	Alfred Dunhill Championship^{1}	−16 (67-64-67=198) (Note: Shortened to 54 holes due to weather.)	Playoff	(South Africa) Shaun Norris
2	21 Dec 2025 (2026 season)	AfrAsia Bank Mauritius Open^{1}	−22 (69-69-64-64=266)	Playoff	(United States) Ryan Gerard

^{1}Co-sanctioned by the Sunshine Tour

European Tour playoff record (2–0)

No.	Year	Tournament	Opponent	Result
1	2025	Alfred Dunhill Championship	(South Africa) Shaun Norris	Won with eagle on first extra hole
2	2025	AfrAsia Bank Mauritius Open	(United States) Ryan Gerard	Won with eagle on second extra hole

=== Sunshine Tour wins (2) ===
No.	Date	Tournament	Winning score	Margin of victory	Runner-up
1	14 Dec 2025	Alfred Dunhill Championship^{1}	−16 (67-64-67=198)	Playoff	(South Africa) Shaun Norris
2	21 Dec 2025	AfrAsia Bank Mauritius Open^{1}	−22 (69-69-64-64=266)	Playoff	(United States) Ryan Gerard

^{1}Co-sanctioned by the European Tour

Sunshine Tour playoff record (2–0)

No.	Year	Tournament	Opponent	Result
1	2025	Alfred Dunhill Championship	(South Africa) Shaun Norris	Won with eagle on first extra hole
2	2025	AfrAsia Bank Mauritius Open	(United States) Ryan Gerard	Won with eagle on second extra hole

== Results in major championships ==
Tournament	2026
Masters Tournament	
PGA Championship	CUT
U.S. Open	CUT
The Open Championship	CUT

Did not play

CUT = missed the half-way cut
T = tied

== Team appearances ==
Amateur

- Junior Golf World Cup (representing South Africa): 2017
- Junior Presidents Cup (representing the International team): 2017, 2019

== See also ==
- 2026 Race to Dubai dual card winners
