= Nelson Mandela Championship =

Tournament information
- Location: Durban, South Africa
- Established: 2012
- Courses: Royal Durban Golf Club (2012); Mount Edgecombe Country Club (2013)
- Par: 70
- Length: 6,612 yards (6,046 m)
- Tours: Sunshine Tour; European Tour
- Format: Stroke play
- Prize fund: €1,000,000
- Month played: December
- Final year: 2013

Final champion
- (South Africa) Dawie van der Walt

Location map
- Location in South Africa Location in KwaZulu-Natal

The Nelson Mandela Championship was a golf tournament, played for the first time in December 2012. It was played in Durban, South Africa and was co-sanctioned by the European Tour and the Sunshine Tour. It was sponsored by the Nelson Mandela Children's Fund. It was the first event of the 2013 European Tour.

The unconventional trophy depicts an image of Mandela reading to children.

== History ==
The first ever event at Royal Durban Golf Club in 2012 was reduced to 36 holes due to rain and in order for the tournament to commence the course was reduced to a par 65 and was 1600 yards shorter. The tournament ended in a playoff. Eduardo de la Riva dropped out with a bogey on the first extra hole, Steve Webster made a bogey on the second extra hole, and Scott Jamieson won with a par. It was his first European Tour victory in his 65th event.

The second event at Mount Edgecombe Country Club in 2013 was a week after Nelson Mandela's death. His funeral was on Sunday 15 December so the tournament was moved forward one day and played Wednesday through Saturday, 11–14 December. Again, this tournament was suspended several times due to a water-logged course and shortened to 54 holes, with one of the holes being shortened from a par 5 to a par 4. Spain's Jorge Campillo and South Africa's Colin Nel shot 59 in the second round, but the European Tour considers them unofficial after the use preferred lies, which allowed players to lift, clean and place their ball. South Africa's Dawie van der Walt earned his second European Tour win.

== Winners ==
Year	Tours (Note: AFR − Sunshine Tour; EUR − European Tour.)	Winner	Score	To par	Margin of victory	Runners-up	Venue
2013	AFR, EUR	(South Africa) Dawie van der Walt	195 (Note: Shortened to 54 holes due to rain.)	−15	2 strokes	(England) Matthew Baldwin (Spain) Jorge Campillo	Mount Edgecombe
2012	AFR, EUR	(Scotland) Scott Jamieson	123 (Note: Shortened to 36 holes due to heavy rain.)	−7	Playoff (Note: Jamieson won with a par on the second hole of a sudden-death playoff; De la Riva was eliminated on the first extra hole.)	(Spain) Eduardo de la Riva (England) Steve Webster	Royal Durban
