= Seve Benson =

English golfer

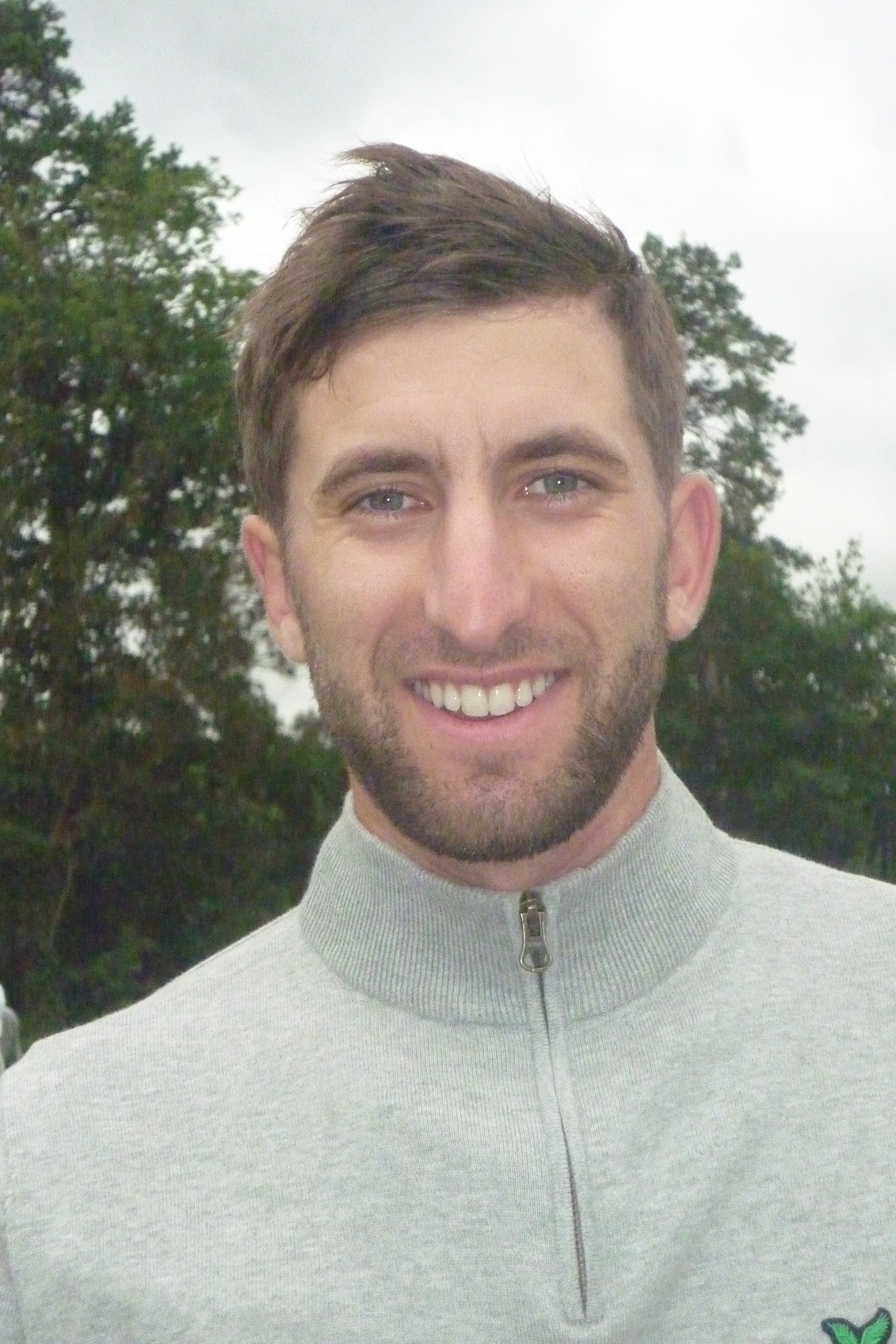
- Benson at the 2011 KLM Open

Personal information
- Nationality: England
- Born: 4 November 1986 (age 39) Guildford, Surrey, England
- Height: 6 ft 1 in (1.85 m)

Career
- Sport: Golf
- Turned professional: 2007
- Current tour: Challenge Tour
- Former tour: European Tour
- Professional wins: 4

Number of wins by tour
- Challenge Tour: 3
- Other: 1

Seve Benson (born 4 November 1986) is an English professional golfer.

== Early life and amateur career ==
Benson was born in Guildford, Surrey, and was named after European golfing legend Seve Ballesteros. As an amateur, he was a member of the English Golf Union's Elite A Squad, and won the Russian and Qatar amateur open championships. He went on to make the cut at each of those countries professional championships while still an amateur, finishing tied 58th in the Qatar Masters, and tied for 10th in the Russian Open.

== Professional career ==
In 2007, Benson turned professional. He attempted to win a place on the European Tour. He reached final stage of the qualifying school, but missed the 72 hole cut. However, by getting through to the final stage, he had already done enough to enable him to play on the second tier Challenge Tour in 2008.

Benson claimed his first professional win in May 2008 at the opening event of the PGA EuroPro Tour season. Later the same month he won for the first time on the Challenge Tour, at the Piemonte Open, where he set a new course record in the 3rd round. He also won the Ypsilon Golf Challenge in August, where he triumphed in a playoff, and finished 6th on the end of season money list, to graduate to the European Tour for 2009.

He was the last golfer to retain his card at the end of the 2009 season, finishing 120th on the Race to Dubai. After suffering injury in 2010, he played 2011 on a medical exemption, but was unable to retain his card and returned to the Challenge Tour.

== Amateur wins ==
- 2006 Russian Amateur Open Championship, Tailhade Cup (Argentina)
- 2007 Qatar Amateur Open Championship

== Professional wins (4) ==
=== Challenge Tour wins (3) ===
No.	Date	Tournament	Winning score	Margin of victory	Runner(s)-up
1	17 May 2008	Piemonte Open	−19 (67-70-62-70=269)	3 strokes	(Switzerland) Raphaël De Sousa
2	24 Aug 2008	Ypsilon Golf Challenge	−16 (67-66-65-70=268)	Playoff	(Spain) Rafa Cabrera-Bello, (South Africa) Branden Grace
3	1 Apr 2012	Barclays Kenya Open	−10 (66-71-71-66=274)	Playoff	(Denmark) Lasse Jensen

Challenge Tour playoff record (2–0)

No.	Year	Tournament	Opponent(s)	Result
1	2008	Ypsilon Golf Challenge	(Spain) Rafa Cabrera-Bello, (South Africa) Branden Grace	Won with birdie on third extra hole Grace eliminated by birdie on second hole
2	2012	Barclays Kenya Open	(Denmark) Lasse Jensen	Won with birdie on first extra hole

=== PGA EuroPro Tour wins (1) ===
No.	Date	Tournament	Winning score	Margin of victory	Runners-up
1	2 May 2008	Wensum Valley International Open	−2 (73-69-72=214)	Playoff	(England) Jamie Harris, (England) Michael Hempstock, (England) Lorne Kelly

== See also ==
- 2008 Challenge Tour graduates
- 2012 Challenge Tour graduates
