= 2013 Sunshine Tour =

Golf tour season

2013 Sunshine Tour season
- Duration: 22 January 2013 – 14 December 2013
- Number of official events: 28
- Most wins: (South Africa) Jacques Blaauw (3) (South Africa) Jaco van Zyl (3)
- Order of Merit: (South Africa) Dawie van der Walt
- Players' Player of the Year: (South Africa) Darren Fichardt
- Rookie of the Year: (South Africa) Dylan Frittelli

The 2013 Sunshine Tour was the 43rd season of the Sunshine Tour (formerly the Southern Africa Tour), the main professional golf tour in South Africa since it was formed in 1971.

== Schedule ==
The following table lists official events during the 2013 season.

Date	Tournament	Location	Purse (R)	Winner (Note: The number in brackets after each winner's name is the number of Sunshine Tour events they had won up to and including that tournament. This information is only shown for Sunshine Tour members.)	OWGR points	Other tours (Note: EUR − European Tour.)	Notes
25 Jan	Telkom PGA Pro-Am	Gauteng	600,000	(South Africa) Oliver Bekker (3)	4		
10 Feb	Joburg Open	Gauteng	€1,300,000	(South Africa) Richard Sterne (6)	22	EUR	
17 Feb	Africa Open	Eastern Cap	€1,000,000	(South Africa) Darren Fichardt (13)	20	EUR	
24 Feb	Dimension Data Pro-Am	Western Cape	4,000,000	(South Africa) Jaco van Zyl (11)	14		Pro-Am
3 Mar	Tshwane Open	Gauteng	€1,500,000	(South Africa) Dawie van der Walt (1)	20	EUR	New tournament
17 Mar	Telkom PGA Championship	Gauteng	3,750,000	(South Africa) Jaco van Zyl (12)	14		
24 Mar	Investec Cup	North West	1,000,000	(South Africa) Jaco van Zyl (13)	14		New tournament
21 Apr	Golden Pilsener Zimbabwe Open	Zimbabwe	1,650,000	(South Africa) Jake Roos (6)	14		
4 May	Investec Royal Swazi Open	Swaziland	1,000,000	(South Africa) James Kingston (10)	14		
19 May	Zambia Sugar Open	Zambia	1,200,000	(Brazil) Adilson da Silva (11)	14		
2 Jun	Lombard Insurance Classic	Swaziland	900,000	(South Africa) Merrick Bremner (3)	6		
7 Jun	Vodacom Origins of Golf at Simola	Eastern Cape	600,000	(South Africa) Jacques Blaauw (1)	4		
15 Jun	Polokwane Classic	Limpopo	500,000	(South Africa) Dean Burmester (1)	4		New tournament
28 Jun	Vodacom Origins of Golf at Selborne Park	Kwazulu-Natal	600,000	(South Africa) Jacques Blaauw (2)	6		
5 Jul	Sun City Challenge	North West	600,000	(Brazil) Adilson da Silva (12)	6		
9 Aug	Vodacom Origins of Golf at Euphoria	Limpopo	600,000	(South Africa) Heinrich Bruiners (1)	6		
23 Aug	Vodacom Origins of Golf at Langebaan	Western Cape	600,000	(South Africa) Jean Hugo (14)	6		
29 Aug	Wild Waves Golf Challenge	Kwazulu-Natal	600,000	(South Africa) Andrew Curlewis (2)	4		
13 Sep	Vodacom Origins of Golf at Parys	Northern Cape	600,000	(South Africa) Andrew Curlewis (3)	4		
21 Sep	Platinum Classic	North West	500,000	(South Africa) Neil Schietekat (1)	4		
11 Oct	Vodacom Origins of Golf Final	Eastern Cape	600,000	(South Africa) J. J. Senekal (1)	4		
20 Oct	BMG Classic	Gauteng	600,000	(South Africa) Ulrich van den Berg (7)	6		
3 Nov	Lion of Africa Cape Town Open	Western Cape	2,000,000	(South Africa) Tjaart van der Walt (1)	14		
7 Nov	Nedbank Affinity Cup	North West	700,000	(South Africa) Jacques Blaauw (3)	4		
24 Nov	South African Open Championship	Gauteng	€1,100,000	(Denmark) Morten Ørum Madsen (n/a)	32	EUR	Flagship event
1 Dec	Alfred Dunhill Championship	Mpumalanga	€1,500,000	(South Africa) Charl Schwartzel (7)	22	EUR	
8 Dec	Nedbank Golf Challenge	North West	US$6,500,000	(Denmark) Thomas Bjørn (n/a)	46	EUR	Limited-field event
14 Dec	Nelson Mandela Championship	Kwazulu-Natal	€1,000,000	(South Africa) Dawie van der Walt (2)	20	EUR	

== Order of Merit ==
The Order of Merit was based on prize money won during the season, calculated in South African rand.

Position	Player	Prize money (R)
1	(South Africa) Dawie van der Walt	5,094,333
2	(South Africa) Darren Fichardt	4,518,495
3	(South Africa) Jaco van Zyl	3,027,749
4	(South Africa) Hennie Otto	2,475,830
5	(South Africa) Jbe' Kruger	2,045,405

== Awards ==
Award	Winner	Ref.
Players' Player of the Year	(South Africa) Darren Fichardt	
Rookie of the Year (Bobby Locke Trophy)	(South Africa) Dylan Frittelli	

== See also ==
- 2013 Big Easy Tour
