= Tshwane Open =

Coordinates: 25.784°S 28.252°E

Tournament information
- Location: Waterkloof, South Africa
- Established: 2013
- Course: Pretoria Country Club
- Par: 71
- Length: 7,081 yards (6,475 m)
- Tours: Sunshine Tour; European Tour
- Format: Stroke play
- Prize fund: R 15,000,000
- Month played: March
- Final year: 2018

Tournament record score
- Aggregate: 264 Charl Schwartzel (2016)
- To par: −21 Dawie van der Walt (2013)

Final champion
- (South Africa) George Coetzee
- Location in South Africa Location in Gauteng

The Tshwane Open was a golf tournament played since 2013 in Gauteng Province, South Africa. It was played at Copperleaf Golf & Country Estate in Centurion, South Africa in 2013 and 2014 and moved to Pretoria Country Club in Waterkloof in 2015. It was a co-sanctioned event by the Sunshine Tour and the European Tour. On 30 October 2018, the European Tour released their 2019 schedule, and it was noted that the Tshwane Open was no longer a co-sanctioned event by the European Tour, with no confirmation of the event's status by the Sunshine Tour.

== Winners ==
Year	Tours (Note: AFR − Sunshine Tour; EUR − European Tour.)	Winner	Score	To par	Margin of victory	Runner(s)-up
2018	AFR, EUR	(South Africa) George Coetzee (2)	266	−18	2 strokes	(England) Sam Horsfield
2017	AFR, EUR	(South Africa) Dean Burmester	266	−18	3 strokes	(Spain) Jorge Campillo (Finland) Mikko Korhonen
2016	AFR, EUR	(South Africa) Charl Schwartzel	264	−16	8 strokes	(Denmark) Jeff Winther
2015	AFR, EUR	(South Africa) George Coetzee	266	−14	1 stroke	(South Africa) Jacques Blaauw
2014	AFR, EUR	(England) Ross Fisher	268	−20	3 strokes	(Northern Ireland) Michael Hoey (South Africa) Daniel van Tonder
2013	AFR, EUR	(South Africa) Dawie van der Walt	267	−21	2 strokes	(South Africa) Darren Fichardt
