= 2020–21 Sunshine Tour =

Golf tour season

2020–21 Sunshine Tour season
- Duration: 19 August 2020 – 6 December 2020
- Number of official events: 11 (Note: A further 16 tournaments were scheduled but were postponed.)
- Most wins: (South Africa) Daniel van Tonder (4)
- Order of Merit: (South Africa) Christiaan Bezuidenhout
- Rookie of the Year: (South Africa) Jayden Schaper

The 2020–21 Sunshine Tour was the 50th season of the Sunshine Tour (formerly the Southern Africa Tour), the main professional golf tour in South Africa since it was formed in 1971.

== In-season changes ==
In light of the COVID-19 pandemic, the tour announced a suspension on 16 March. Later, the first two scheduled tournaments, the Investec Royal Swazi Open and the Zambia Open, were postponed. On 5 August, the tour announced its resumption, starting in mid-August with a new series of five 54-hole tournaments, called the "Rise Up Series".

== Schedule ==
The following table lists official events during the 2020–21 season.

Date	Tournament	Location	Purse (R)	Winner (Note: The number in brackets after each winner's name is the number of Sunshine Tour events they had won up to and including that tournament. This information is only shown for Sunshine Tour members.)	OWGR points	Other tours (Note: EUR − European Tour.)	Notes
~~17 May~~	Zambia Open	Zambia	–	Postponed	–		
~~24 May~~	Lombard Insurance Classic	Western Cape	–	Postponed	–		
~~5 Jun~~	Sun City Challenge	North West	–	Postponed	–		
~~25 Jul~~	Vodacom Origins of Golf	Western Cape	–	Postponed	–		
~~31 Jul~~	Royal Swazi Spa Challenge	Eswatini	–	Postponed	–		
~~7 Aug~~	FNB Eswatini Nkonyeni Sunshine Tour Golf Challenge	Eswatini	–	Postponed	–		New tournament
~~16 Aug~~	Zimbabwe Open	Zimbabwe	–	Postponed	–		
21 Aug	Betway Championship	Gauteng	600,000	(South Africa) Darren Fichardt (18)	7		New tournament
~~23 Aug~~	Zanaco Masters	Zambia	–	Postponed	–		
28 Aug	African Bank Sunshine Tour Championship	Gauteng	600,000	(South Africa) Daniel van Tonder (4)	7		New tournament
~~29 Aug~~	Vodacom Origins of Golf	Free State	–	Postponed	–		
4 Sep	Titleist Championship	Gauteng	600,000	(South Africa) George Coetzee (11)	7		New tournament
~~5 Sep~~	King's Cup	Eastern Cape	–	Postponed	–		
~~13 Sep~~	KCB Karen Masters	Kenya	–	Postponed	–		
~~19 Sep~~	Vodacom Origins of Golf	Eastern Cape	–	Postponed	–		
~~25 Sep~~	Sun Boardwalk Challenge	Eastern Cape	–	Postponed	–		
25 Sep	Vodacom Championship Unlocked	Gauteng	600,000	(South Africa) Daniel van Tonder (5)	4		New tournament
2 Oct	Vodacom Championship Reloaded	Gauteng	600,000	(South Africa) Daniel van Tonder (6)	4		New tournament
~~10 Oct~~	Vodacom Origins of Golf	KwaZulu-Natal	–	Postponed	–		
~~23 Oct~~	Sibaya Challenge	KwaZulu-Natal	–	Postponed	–		
23 Oct; ~~2 Oct~~	Sun Wild Coast Sun Challenge	KwaZulu-Natal	700,000	(South Africa) Merrick Bremner (7)	4		
31 Oct; ~~9 May~~	Investec Royal Swazi Open	North West	1,500,000	(South Africa) Daniel van Tonder (7)	14		
6 Nov	Time Square Casino Challenge	Gauteng	700,000	(South Africa) Ruan Korb (1)	7		New tournament
~~7 Nov~~	Vodacom Origins of Golf Final	North West	–	Postponed	–		
22 Nov	Joburg Open	Gauteng	19,500,000	(Denmark) Joachim B. Hansen (n/a)	19	EUR	
29 Nov	Alfred Dunhill Championship	Mpumalanga	29,000,000	(South Africa) Christiaan Bezuidenhout (3)	32	EUR	Flagship event
6 Dec	South African Open	North West	19,500,000	(South Africa) Christiaan Bezuidenhout (4)	19	EUR	

== Order of Merit ==
The Order of Merit was based on prize money won during the season, calculated in South African rand.

Position	Player	Prize money (R)
1	(South Africa) Christiaan Bezuidenhout	7,789,088
2	(Denmark) Joachim B. Hansen	3,277,475
3	(South Africa) Wilco Nienaber	2,681,740
4	(South Africa) Jayden Schaper	2,170,478
5	(South Africa) Shaun Norris	1,183,904

== Awards ==
Award	Winner	Ref.
Rookie of the Year (Bobby Locke Trophy)	(South Africa) Jayden Schaper	

== See also ==
- 2020–21 Big Easy Tour
