= Ypsilon Golf Challenge =

Ypilson Golf Challenge
Tournament information
- Location: Prague, Czech Republic
- Established: 2008
- Course: Ypilson Golf Resort
- Par: 71
- Length: 6,621 yards (6,054 m)
- Tour: Challenge Tour
- Format: Stroke play
- Prize fund: €180,000
- Month played: August
- Final year: 2008

Tournament record score
- Aggregate: 268 Seve Benson (2008); 268 Rafa Cabrera-Bello (2008); 268 Branden Grace (2008)
- To par: −16 as above

Final champion
- (England) Seve Benson
- Location in the Czech Republic

The Ypsilon Golf Challenge was a golf tournament on the Challenge Tour that was played in 2008 at Ypsilon Golf Resort in Liberec, Czech Republic. It was hosted by European Tour player Alex Čejka and won by England's Seve Benson, who defeated Rafa Cabrera-Bello and Branden Grace in a playoff.

== Winners ==
Year	Winner	Score	To par	Margin of victory	Runners-up
2008	(England) Seve Benson	268	−16	Playoff	(Spain) Rafa Cabrera-Bello (South Africa) Branden Grace
