= Michiel Bothma =

South African professional golfer

Personal information
- Full name: Michiel Frederick Bothma
- Nationality: South Africa
- Born: 13 March 1973 (age 53) Pretoria, South Africa
- Height: 1.80 m (5 ft 11 in)

Career
- Sport: Golf
- Turned professional: 1993
- Current tour: Sunshine Tour
- Former tours: European Tour; Challenge Tour; PGA EuroPro Tour
- Professional wins: 6

Number of wins by tour
- Sunshine Tour: 4
- Challenge Tour: 1
- Other: 1

Michiel Frederick Bothma (born 13 March 1973) is a South African professional golfer.

== Early life ==
Bothma was born in Pretoria.

== Professional career ==
In 1993, Bothma turned professional. He has played predominantly on the Sunshine Tour. He won for the first time in 2002 at the Telkom PGA Championship, one of the most prestigious tournaments in South Africa. In 2010 he won the PGA Championship for the second time.

== Professional wins (6) ==
=== Sunshine Tour wins (4) ===
No.	Date	Tournament	Winning score	Margin of victory	Runner-up
1	17 Nov 2002	Telkom PGA Championship	−15 (67-69-69-68=273)	Playoff	(South Africa) Mark Murless
2	31 Aug 2007	Telkom PGA Pro-Am	−12 (70-66-68=204)	1 stroke	(South Africa) Jaco van Zyl
3	21 Feb 2010	Telkom PGA Championship (2)	−20 (71-67-67-63=268)	1 stroke	(South Africa) George Coetzee
4	2 Oct 2010	SAA Pro-Am Invitational (3rd)	−10 (72-68-66=206)	Playoff	(South Africa) Jaco van Zyl

Sunshine Tour playoff record (2–0)

No.	Year	Tournament	Opponent	Result
1	2002	Telkom PGA Championship	(South Africa) Mark Murless	Won with par on second extra hole
2	2010	SAA Pro-Am Invitational (3rd)	(South Africa) Jaco van Zyl	Won with par on second extra hole

=== Challenge Tour wins (1) ===
No.	Date	Tournament	Winning score	Margin of victory	Runner-up
1	3 Apr 2011	Barclays Kenya Open	−14 (60-67-69-68=270)	2 strokes	(South Africa) Tyrone Ferreira

=== IGT Pro Tour wins (1) ===
No.	Date	Tournament	Winning score	Margin of victory	Runner-up
1	25 Apr 2018	IGT Challenge #3	−13 (71-67-65=203)	3 strokes	(South Korea) Kim Dong-kwan
