= James Kamte =

South African professional golfer (born 1982)

Personal information
- Full name: James Bongani Kamte
- Nickname: Cobra
- Nationality: South Africa
- Born: 20 July 1982 (age 44) Humansdorp, South Africa
- Height: 1.69 m (5 ft 7 in)
- Weight: 80 kg (176 lb; 12 st 8 lb)
- Spouse: Nicky (m. 2005, divorced)

Career
- Sport: Golf
- Turned professional: 2003
- Current tour: Sunshine Tour (joined 2003)
- Former tours: European Tour (2008–11); Asian Tour (2009–11); Challenge Tour
- Professional wins: 5

Number of wins by tour
- Asian Tour: 1
- Sunshine Tour: 4

Best results in major championships
- Masters Tournament: DNP
- PGA Championship: DNP
- U.S. Open: CUT: 2009
- The Open Championship: DNP

James Bongani Kamte (born 20 July 1982), nicknamed "Cobra", is a South African professional golfer. He has played on the Sunshine Tour, Challenge Tour, European Tour, and Asian Tour. He earned his tour card for the 2008 European Tour season by finishing in the top 30 of the qualifying school.

== Early life ==
Kamte was a football player in his childhood and his nickname, "Cobra", comes from his football days.

He grew up in Kwanomzamo Humansdorp, and received a bursary through several Golf clubs in the St Francis area and Nomads Golf Club, to attend Woodridge College where he matriculated in 2000.

== Amateur career ==
In 2002, he recorded a number of highlights at elite amateur events. He finished tied for third at the South African Amateur Strokeplay. He then finished runner-up at the Nomads Central Gauteng Under-23 Open. He won the Gauteng North Open shortly thereafter.

In 2003, he represented Gauteng in the Under-23 division and subsequently in the Gauteng Seniors side. Shortly before he turned professional he was the 5th ranked amateur in South Africa.

== Professional career ==
=== Sunshine Tour ===
In 2003, Kamte turned professional. The year 2007 was successful for Kamte. On the Sunshine Tour, he started his run on 2 July by finishing second in the Samsung Royal Swazi Sun Open, closely followed by another second-place finish at the Vodacom Origins Tournament in Pretoria a week later. On the European Challenge Tour, Kamte's best finish has been second place in the Kenya Open in Nairobi, Kenya. He also had a fourth-place finish at the Vodafone Challenge in Germany.

After a good run of form, James went on to win his first Sunshine Tour victory at the Seekers Travel Pro-Am tournament at the Dainfern Country Club, Johannesburg on 8 September 2007.

On 8 June 2009, Kamte qualified for the 2009 U.S. Open through sectional qualifying in Columbus, Ohio.

He won his fourth Sunshine Tour event at the BMG Classic in 2011.

=== European Tour ===
Kamte came through the European Tour qualifying school, finishing tied for 22nd place, right on the cut-off line for the top 30 and ties who earn their playing privileges on the main European Tour for the 2008 season. This made him the first black South African player to earn European Tour playing privileges since Vincent Tshabalala in 1976. He ended the season ranked 138th on the Order of Merit, meaning Kamte would have limited playing opportunities for the 2009 season.

Kamte followed up his performance at the European qualifying school by winning the Sunshine Tour's Dimension Data Pro-Am in January 2008, becoming the first black South African golfer to win an event on the summer swing of that tour.

=== Asian Tour ===
With limited status on the European Tour, Kamte entered the Asian Tour qualifying school for 2009 and finished fourth. He followed up this success by winning the first event of the 2009 season, the Asian Tour International in Thailand, thus guaranteeing Kamte starts in events co-sanctioned by the Asian and European tours for the remainder of the season.

== Professional wins (5) ==
=== Asian Tour wins (1) ===
No.	Date	Tournament	Winning score	Margin of victory	Runner-up
1	8 Feb 2009	Asian Tour International	−16 (71-63-68-66=268)	2 strokes	(Japan) Tetsuji Hiratsuka

=== Sunshine Tour wins (4) ===
No.	Date	Tournament	Winning score	Margin of Victory	Runner(s)-up
1	8 Sep 2007	Seekers Travel Pro-Am	−13 (68-68-67=203)	1 stroke	(South Africa) Albert Pistorius
2	27 Jan 2008	Dimension Data Pro-Am	−11 (67-69-71-70=277)	3 strokes	(South Africa) James Kingston
3	19 Oct 2008	Metmar Highveld Classic	−20 (69-63-64=196)	5 strokes	(South Africa) Desvonde Botes, (Scotland) Doug McGuigan, (South Africa) Brandon Pieters
4	30 Oct 2011	BMG Classic	−9 (72-71-64=207)	Playoff	(South Africa) Dawie van der Walt

Sunshine Tour playoff record (1–0)

No.	Year	Tournament	Opponent	Result
1	2011	BMG Classic	(South Africa) Dawie van der Walt	Won with birdie on first extra hole

== Results in major championships ==
Tournament	2009
U.S. Open	CUT

CUT = missed the half-way cut
Note: Kamte only played in the U.S. Open.

== Team appearances ==
Amateur

- South African Presidents Team Colours (representing Gauteng): 2003 (captain)

== See also ==
- 2007 European Tour Qualifying School graduates
- 2009 European Tour Qualifying School graduates
- List of African golfers
