= Branden Grace =

South African professional golfer (born 1988)

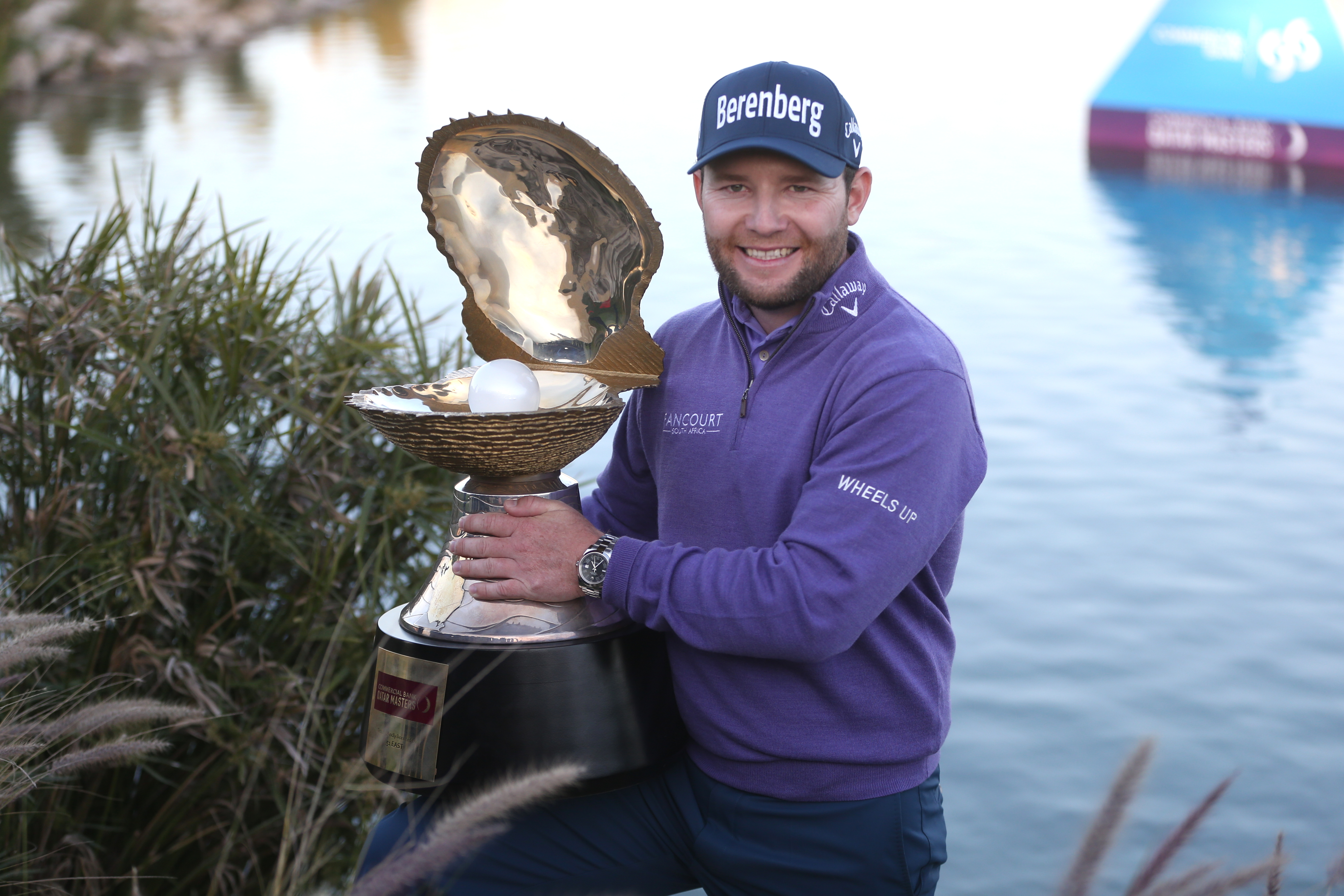
- Grace at the 2016 Commercial Bank Qatar Masters

Personal information
- Full name: Branden John Grace
- Nickname: Gracie
- Nationality: South Africa
- Born: 20 May 1988 (age 38) Pretoria, South Africa
- Height: 1.78 m (5 ft 10 in)
- Weight: 78 kg (172 lb; 12.3 st)
- Spouse: Nieke Coetzee (m. 2016)
- Children: 2

Career
- Sport: Golf
- Turned professional: 2007
- Current tours: European Tour; Asian Tour; Sunshine Tour; LIV Golf
- Former tours: PGA Tour; Challenge Tour
- Professional wins: 15
- Highest ranking: 10 (14 February 2016)

Number of wins by tour
- PGA Tour: 2
- European Tour: 9
- Sunshine Tour: 6
- LIV Golf: 1

Best results in major championships
- Masters Tournament: T18: 2013
- PGA Championship: 3rd: 2015
- U.S. Open: T4: 2015
- The Open Championship: T6: 2017

Achievements and awards
- Sunshine Tour Order of Merit winner: 2012

Branden John Grace (born 20 May 1988) is a South African professional golfer. He currently plays for LIV Golf. Grace formerly played on the European Tour, the PGA Tour, and the Sunshine Tour. In 2012, he became the first player in the history of the European Tour to win his first four European Tour titles in the same year. In 2017, Grace recorded the lowest score ever in a major championship when he shot a 62 in the Open Championship.

== Amateur career ==
In 1988, Grace was born in Pretoria. As an amateur he participated in the Ernie Els and Fancourt Foundation. He won the South African Amateur Stroke Play Championship in 2006.

== Professional career ==
=== Challenge Tour ===
In 2007, Grace turned professional. That year, Grace played on the Challenge Tour which is Europe's second-tier tour. He only played in eight events but recorded two top-ten finishes. In 2008, he played on the Challenge Tour and the Sunshine Tour. He finished 35th on the Challenge Tour's Order of Merit while recording three top-10 finishes including finishing in a tie for second at the Ypsilon Golf Challenge. He then earned his European Tour card for 2009 through qualifying school.

In 2009, Grace struggled on the European Tour but finished in a tie for second at the Africa Open on the Sunshine Tour, behind winner Retief Goosen. He finished in the top 10 in seven of the nine Sunshine Tour events that he played in en route to an 11th-place finish on the Order of Merit. He picked up his first professional win in 2010 at the Coca-Cola Charity Championship on the Sunshine Tour. In 2011, he finished 24th on the Challenge Tour's Order of Merit while recording five top-10 finishes. He also finished 7th on the Sunshine Tour's Order of Merit. He went back to qualifying school to earn his European Tour card for 2012.

=== European Tour ===
In January 2012, he won the Joburg Open which was co-sanctioned by the European Tour and the Sunshine Tour. He won by one stroke over Jamie Elson. He then won the Volvo Golf Champions the following week to make it back-to-back European Tour victories, beating his veteran compatriots Ernie Els and Retief Goosen in a playoff with a birdie on the first hole. Grace became the first player since Fred Couples in 1995 to follow his first victory with another consecutively. As a result, Grace moved inside the world's top 100 in the Official World Golf Ranking.

On 22 April, Grace won his third tournament on the European Tour when he won the Volvo China Open. Only two players have won three European Tour titles in a single season at a younger age, Seve Ballesteros did it three times between 1977 and 1980, and Sandy Lyle did it in 1979. Grace also became only the third South African to win three times in a single season, joining Ernie Els and Retief Goosen. He also became only the second player in European Tour history to win three times in the season after graduating from qualifying school.

In September, Grace captured his third Sunshine Tour title at the Vodacom Origins of Golf Final. On 7 October, Grace won his fourth European Tour title and fifth worldwide title of 2012 at the Alfred Dunhill Links Championship. He broke the scoring record at the tournament to win at 22 under par, two strokes clear of Thorbjørn Olesen. His record total included a European Tour record equalling 60 at Kingsbarns during the first round. Grace moved to third in the Race to Dubai and also to a career high 37th in the Official World Golf Ranking. Grace capped off a highly successful 2012 season by winning the Sunshine Tour Order of Merit.

Grace had a less successful season in 2013, finishing 18th on the European Tour's Race to Dubai, his best finish being second in the Aberdeen Asset Management Scottish Open where he lost in a sudden-death playoff to Phil Mickelson. During 2014, Grace continued his high showings on the European Tour Race to Dubai. Despite a second winless season, Grace finished 31st in the year end standings, with a best performance of second in the Volvo Golf Champions.

In December 2014, as part of the 2015 European Tour season, Grace won his fifth European Tour event, and first since 2012, at the Alfred Dunhill Championship. Grace won the event by 7 strokes from fellow South African Louis Oosthuizen. Grace soon followed this up with his second win of the 2015 season with a win at the Commercial Bank Qatar Masters in January 2015. The following month, he won again on home soil at the Dimension Data Pro-Am on the Sunshine Tour, with a two stroke victory over Keith Horne.

At the 2015 U.S. Open at Chambers Bay, Grace held a share of the lead through 54 holes. On Sunday, he was in the penultimate group with eventual champion, Jordan Spieth, and was still tied for the lead heading to the 16th hole, until he blocked his drive to the right and out of bounds, forcing him to re-tee and eventually leading to a double bogey to spiral him out of contention to win. He finished with a final round 71, and a tied for 4th position. At the 2015 PGA Championship at Whistling Straits Grace placed in the top-five for the second time in his career at the major championships, when he placed third.

At the 2015 Presidents Cup, Grace would have a perfect week. On the opening day (Thursday foursomes), Grace teamed with fellow South African Louis Oosthuizen to defeat Matt Kuchar and Patrick Reed in comfortable fashion 3 and 2. On Day 2 (Friday fourball), Grace would again team with Oosthuizen in a dominant performance against world number one Jordan Spieth and Dustin Johnson winning 4 and 3. On Day 3 (Saturday morning foursomes), Grace for a third time teaming with Oosthuizen, won in another comfortable match 3 and 2, defeating the team of Reed and Rickie Fowler. Later in the day during (Saturday afternoon fourball), teaming with Oosthuizen a fourth and final time, the team won its fourth match against the undefeated duo of Bubba Watson and J. B. Holmes. The fourball match being the only time Grace would see the 18th hole all week, his team winning 1 up at the last. On the final day of the event (Sunday singles), Grace played against Kuchar and started out red hot, dominating Kuchar on the front nine. Kuchar fought back from several holes down before losing 2 and 1. Grace's perfect record of 5–0–0 was the fifth such occasion in Presidents Cup history and just the second time for the International side.

On 30 January 2016, Grace defended his Commercial Bank Qatar Masters title for his seventh victory on the European Tour. He finished two strokes ahead of Rafa Cabrera-Bello and Thorbjørn Olesen, after shooting a three under round of 69 on a day when he started two back of leader Paul Lawrie. Grace became the first player to successfully defend the tournament.

=== PGA Tour ===
Grace was able to play on the PGA Tour in 2016, in the "Top 125 Non-member" category. This followed his successes in the 2015 majors and other PGA-recognised tournaments. On 17 April 2016, Grace claimed his first PGA Tour victory at the RBC Heritage after shooting a final round 66.

On 22 July, Grace shot a 62 in the third round of the Open Championship at the Royal Birkdale Golf Club in Southport, England, setting a record for the lowest round in a men's major championship.

Hole	1	2	3	4	5	6	7	8	9	10	11	12	13	14	15	16	17	18
Par	4	4	4	3	4	4	3	4	4	4	4	3	4	3	5	4	5	4
Grace's score	−1	−1	−1	−2	−3	−3	−3	−4	−5	−5	−5	−5	−5	−6	−6	−7	−8	−8

Birdie

In November 2017, Grace won the Nedbank Golf Challenge at the Gary Player Country Club in Sun City, North West province, South Africa. This victory was worth $1,166,660.

In January 2019, Grace started working with Scottish caddie, Craig Connelly.

In January, Grace fired a final round 62 to win the South African Open. The victory capped a unique milestone for Grace. Previously in his career, he had won every significant tournament in South African golf: Joburg Open (2012), Alfred Dunhill Championship (2014), the Dimension Data Pro-Am (2015) and the Nedbank Golf Challenge (2017). The national Open was the only one missing.

In February, Grace finished eagle-birdie at the Puerto Rico Open to claim his second PGA Tour victory. In August, Grace tied for the lead with five other players after 72 holes at the Wyndham Championship. Kevin Kisner took the title in the playoff.

=== LIV Golf ===
In 2022, Grace joined LIV Golf. That year, he won the LIV Golf Invitational Portland. In 2023, he lost a playoff at the LIV Golf Tulsa to Dustin Johnson.

== Amateur wins ==
- 2006 SANLAM SA Amateur Stroke play Championship

== Professional wins (15) ==
=== PGA Tour wins (2) ===
No.	Date	Tournament	Winning score	Margin of victory	Runner(s)-up
1	17 Apr 2016	RBC Heritage	−9 (66-74-69-66=275)	2 strokes	(England) Luke Donald, (Scotland) Russell Knox
2	28 Feb 2021	Puerto Rico Open	−19 (67-68-68-66=269)	1 stroke	(Venezuela) Jhonattan Vegas

PGA Tour playoff record (0–1)

No.	Year	Tournament	Opponents	Result
1	2021	Wyndham Championship	(South Korea) Kim Si-woo, (United States) Kevin Kisner, (United States) Kevin Na, (Australia) Adam Scott, (Canada) Roger Sloan	Kisner won with birdie on second extra hole

=== European Tour wins (9) ===
Legend
Rolex Series (1)
Other European Tour (8)

No.	Date	Tournament	Winning score	Margin of victory	Runner(s)-up
1	15 Jan 2012	Joburg Open^{1}	−17 (67-66-65-72=270)	1 stroke	(England) Jamie Elson
2	22 Jan 2012	Volvo Golf Champions	−12 (68-66-75-71=280)	Playoff	(South Africa) Ernie Els, (South Africa) Retief Goosen
3	22 Apr 2012	Volvo China Open^{2}	−21 (67-67-64-69=267)	3 strokes	(Belgium) Nicolas Colsaerts
4	7 Oct 2012	Alfred Dunhill Links Championship	−22 (60-67-69-70=266)	2 strokes	(Denmark) Thorbjørn Olesen
5	14 Dec 2014 (2015 season)	Alfred Dunhill Championship^{1}	−20 (62-66-72-68=268)	7 strokes	(South Africa) Louis Oosthuizen
6	24 Jan 2015	Commercial Bank Qatar Masters	−19 (67-68-68-66=269)	1 stroke	(Scotland) Marc Warren
7	30 Jan 2016	Commercial Bank Qatar Masters (2)	−14 (70-67-68-69=274)	2 strokes	(Spain) Rafa Cabrera-Bello, (Denmark) Thorbjørn Olesen
8	12 Nov 2017	Nedbank Golf Challenge	−11 (68-75-68-66=277)	1 stroke	(Scotland) Scott Jamieson
9	12 Jan 2020	South African Open^{1}	−21 (64-70-67-62=263)	3 strokes	(South Africa) Louis Oosthuizen

^{1}Co-sanctioned by the Sunshine Tour
^{2}Co-sanctioned by the OneAsia Tour

European Tour playoff record (1–1)

No.	Year	Tournament	Opponent(s)	Result
1	2012	Volvo Golf Champions	(South Africa) Ernie Els, (South Africa) Retief Goosen	Won with birdie on first extra hole
2	2013	Aberdeen Asset Management Scottish Open	(United States) Phil Mickelson	Lost to birdie on first extra hole

=== Sunshine Tour wins (6) ===
Legend
Flagship events (1)
Other Sunshine Tour (5)

No.	Date	Tournament	Winning score	Margin of victory	Runner(s)-up
1	18 Nov 2010	Coca-Cola Charity Championship	−7 (68-71-70=209)	2 strokes	(South Africa) Ulrich van den Berg, (South Africa) Justin Walters
2	15 Jan 2012	Joburg Open^{1}	−17 (67-66-65-72=270)	1 stroke	(England) Jamie Elson
3	28 Sep 2012	Vodacom Origins of Golf Final	−10 (69-72-68=209)	3 strokes	(South Africa) Allan Versfeld
4	14 Dec 2014	Alfred Dunhill Championship^{1}	−20 (62-66-72-68=268)	7 strokes	(South Africa) Louis Oosthuizen
5	22 Feb 2015	Dimension Data Pro-Am	−11 (71-68-69-70=278)	2 strokes	(South Africa) Keith Horne
6	12 Jan 2020	South African Open^{1}	−21 (64-70-67-62=263)	3 strokes	(South Africa) Louis Oosthuizen

^{1}Co-sanctioned by the European Tour

=== LIV Golf League wins (1) ===
No.	Date	Tournament	Winning score	Margin of victory	Runner-up
1	2 Jul 2022	LIV Golf Invitational Portland	−13 (69-69-65=203)	2 strokes	(Mexico) Carlos Ortiz

LIV Golf League playoff record (0–1)

No.	Year	Tournament	Opponents	Result
1	2023	LIV Golf Tulsa	(United States) Dustin Johnson, (Australia) Cameron Smith	Johnson won with birdie on first extra hole

== Playoff record ==
Challenge Tour playoff record (0–1)

No.	Year	Tournament	Opponents	Result
1	2008	Ypsilon Golf Challenge	(England) Seve Benson, (Spain) Rafa Cabrera-Bello	Benson won with birdie on third extra hole Grace eliminated by birdie on second hole

== Results in major championships ==
Results not in chronological order in 2020.

Tournament	2009	2010	2011	2012	2013	2014	2015	2016	2017	2018
Masters Tournament					T18	CUT	CUT	CUT	T27	T24
U.S. Open				T51	CUT		T4	T5	T50	T25
The Open Championship	T43			T77	T64	T36	T20	T72	T6	CUT
PGA Championship				CUT	CUT	T46	3	T4	CUT	T27

Tournament	2019	2020	2021	2022	2023
Masters Tournament	T58				
PGA Championship	CUT		T38	CUT	
U.S. Open	CUT	CUT	T7	CUT	
The Open Championship	T51	NT	CUT		CUT

Top 10
Did not play

CUT = missed the half-way cut
"T" = tied
NT = No tournament due to COVID-19 pandemic

=== Summary ===
Tournament	Wins	2nd	3rd	Top-5	Top-10	Top-25	Events	Cuts made
Masters Tournament	0	0	0	0	0	2	7	4
PGA Championship	0	0	1	2	2	2	10	5
U.S. Open	0	0	0	2	3	4	10	6
The Open Championship	0	0	0	0	1	2	11	8
Totals	0	0	1	4	6	10	38	23

- Most consecutive cuts made – 6 (2016 U.S. Open – 2017 Open Championship)
- Longest streak of top-10s – 1 (six times)

== Results in The Players Championship ==
Tournament	2013	2014	2015	2016	2017	2018	2019	2020	2021	2022
The Players Championship	T48		T42	T57	T48	T46	T72	C	CUT	T53

Did not play

CUT = missed the halfway cut
"T" indicates a tie for a place
C = Cancelled after the first round due to the COVID-19 pandemic

== Results in World Golf Championships ==
Results not in chronological order prior to 2015.

Tournament	2012	2013	2014	2015	2016	2017	2018	2019	2020
Championship	T35	T49	T40	54	T23	T32	T30	T33	T42
Match Play		R64	R64	R16	T18	T39	T29	R16	NT^{1}
Invitational	T36	T65	T23	T17	T10	T28	T63		
Champions		T39		T5	T30	T15	T41		NT^{1}

^{1}Cancelled due to COVID-19 pandemic

Top 10
Did not play

QF, R16, R32, R64 = Round in which player lost in match play
NT = No tournament
"T" = Tied

== Team appearances ==
Professional

- Presidents Cup (representing the International team): 2013, 2015, 2017
- World Cup (representing South Africa): 2013

== See also ==
- 2008 European Tour Qualifying School graduates
- 2011 European Tour Qualifying School graduates
- List of golfers with most European Tour wins
