= Piemonte Open (golf) =

Defunct 21st-century Italian golf tournament

Tournament information
- Location: Turin, Italy
- Established: 2008
- Course: Royal Park I Roveri
- Par: 72
- Length: 6,954 yards (6,359 m)
- Tour: Challenge Tour
- Format: Stroke play
- Prize fund: €150,000
- Month played: May
- Final year: 2009

Tournament record score
- Aggregate: 269 Seve Benson (2008)
- To par: −19 as above

Final champion
- (Italy) Edoardo Molinari
- Location in Italy Location in Piedmont

The Piemonte Open was a golf tournament on the Challenge Tour, played near Turin, in Piedmont, Italy. It was held in 2008 and 2009.

== Winners ==
Year	Winner	Score	To par	Margin of victory	Runner-up	Venue
2009	(Italy) Edoardo Molinari	270	−18	4 strokes	(England) Gary Boyd	Royal Park
2008	(England) Seve Benson	269	−19	3 strokes	(Switzerland) Raphaël De Sousa	Circolo Golf Torino; Royal Park
