= Tongoona Charamba =

Zimbabwean golfer

Personal information
- Full name: Tongoona Charamba
- Nicknames: TC, Tongo
- Nationality: Zimbabwe
- Born: 2 February 1982 (age 44) Salisbury (now Harare), Zimbabwe
- Height: 1.79 m (5 ft 10 in)

Career
- Sport: Golf
- Turned professional: 2003
- Current tour: Sunshine Tour
- Professional wins: 2

Number of wins by tour
- Sunshine Tour: 2

Tongoona "TC" Charamba (born 2 February 1982) is a professional golfer from Zimbabwe.

== Early life and amateur career ==
Charamba was born in Harare, Zimbabwe. He won 12 amateur tournaments, including the Zimbabwe Amateur Matchplay and Stokeplay Championships in 2002, and led the Zimbabwe Order of Merit from 2000 to 2002,

== Professional career ==
In 2003, Charamba turned professional. Charamba became just the third black golfer to win on the Sunshine Tour when he claimed the SAA Pro-Am Invitational in 2006. In 2008, he won the MTC Namibia PGA Championship and finished a career best 27th on the Sunshine Tour Order of Merit. He has made more than R1,000,000 (around €90,000 or US$125,000) in total earnings on the tour.

== Amateur wins ==
- 2002 Zimbabwe Amateur Stroke Play Championship, Zimbabwe Amateur Match Play Championship

== Professional wins (2) ==
=== Sunshine Tour wins (2) ===
No.	Date	Tournament	Winning score	Margin of victory	Runners-up
1	18 May 2006	SAA Pro-Am Invitational (2nd)	−17 (65-67-67=199)	2 strokes	(South Africa) Jean Hugo, (South Africa) Hennie Otto
2	9 Nov 2008	MTC Namibia PGA Championship	−14 (68-67-69-66=270)	Playoff	(South Africa) Merrick Bremner, (South Africa) Nic Henning

Sunshine Tour playoff record (1–1)

No.	Year	Tournament	Opponent(s)	Result
1	2008	MTC Namibia PGA Championship	(South Africa) Merrick Bremner, (South Africa) Nic Henning	Won with birdie on third extra hole Henning eliminated by par on second hole
2	2010	Lombard Insurance Classic	(South Africa) Grant Muller	Lost on third extra hole

== Team appearances ==
Amateur

- Eisenhower Trophy (representing Zimbabwe): 2002
