= Christiaan Basson =

South African professional golfer (born 1982)

Personal information
- Nationality: South Africa
- Born: 30 April 1982 (age 44) Strand, South Africa
- Height: 5 ft 6 in (1.68 m)
- Weight: 136 lb (62 kg; 9.7 st)

Career
- Sport: Golf
- Turned professional: 2007
- Current tour: Sunshine Tour
- Professional wins: 4

Number of wins by tour
- Sunshine Tour: 4

Christiaan Basson (born 30 April 1982) is a South African professional golfer.

== Early life and amateur career ==
Basson was born in Strand, Western Cape. As an amateur he represented South Africa for the Eisenhower Trophy in 2006.

== Professional career ==
In 2007, Basson turned professional and joined the Sunshine Tour. He picked up his first win on Tour in 2009 at the Coca-Cola Charity Championship. Basson picked up his second victory in 2012 at the Investec Royal Swazi Open.

== Professional wins (4) ==
=== Sunshine Tour wins (4) ===
No.	Date	Tournament	Winning score	Margin of victory	Runner(s)-up
1	26 Nov 2009	Coca-Cola Charity Championship	−13 (70-65-68=203)	4 strokes	(South Africa) Andrew Curlewis, (South Africa) Louis Oosthuizen
2	5 May 2012	Investec Royal Swazi Open	50 pts (10-17-11-12=50)	1 point	(South Africa) Desvonde Botes, (South Africa) Daniel van Tonder
3	25 May 2014	Lombard Insurance Classic	−19 (69-66-62=197)	5 strokes	(Brazil) Adilson da Silva, (South Africa) Ruan de Smidt, (South Africa) Jake Redman, (South Africa) Neil Schietekat
4	3 Oct 2015	Vodacom Origins of Golf at St Francis	−11 (70-66-69=205)	1 stroke	(Zimbabwe) Mark Williams

Sunshine Tour playoff record (0–1)

No.	Year	Tournament	Opponent	Result
1	2012	Vodacom Origins of Golf at Sishen	(South Africa) Trevor Fisher Jnr	Lost to birdie on first extra hole

== South African national team appearances ==
Amateur

- Eisenhower Trophy: 2006
