= Jaco van Zyl =

South African golfer

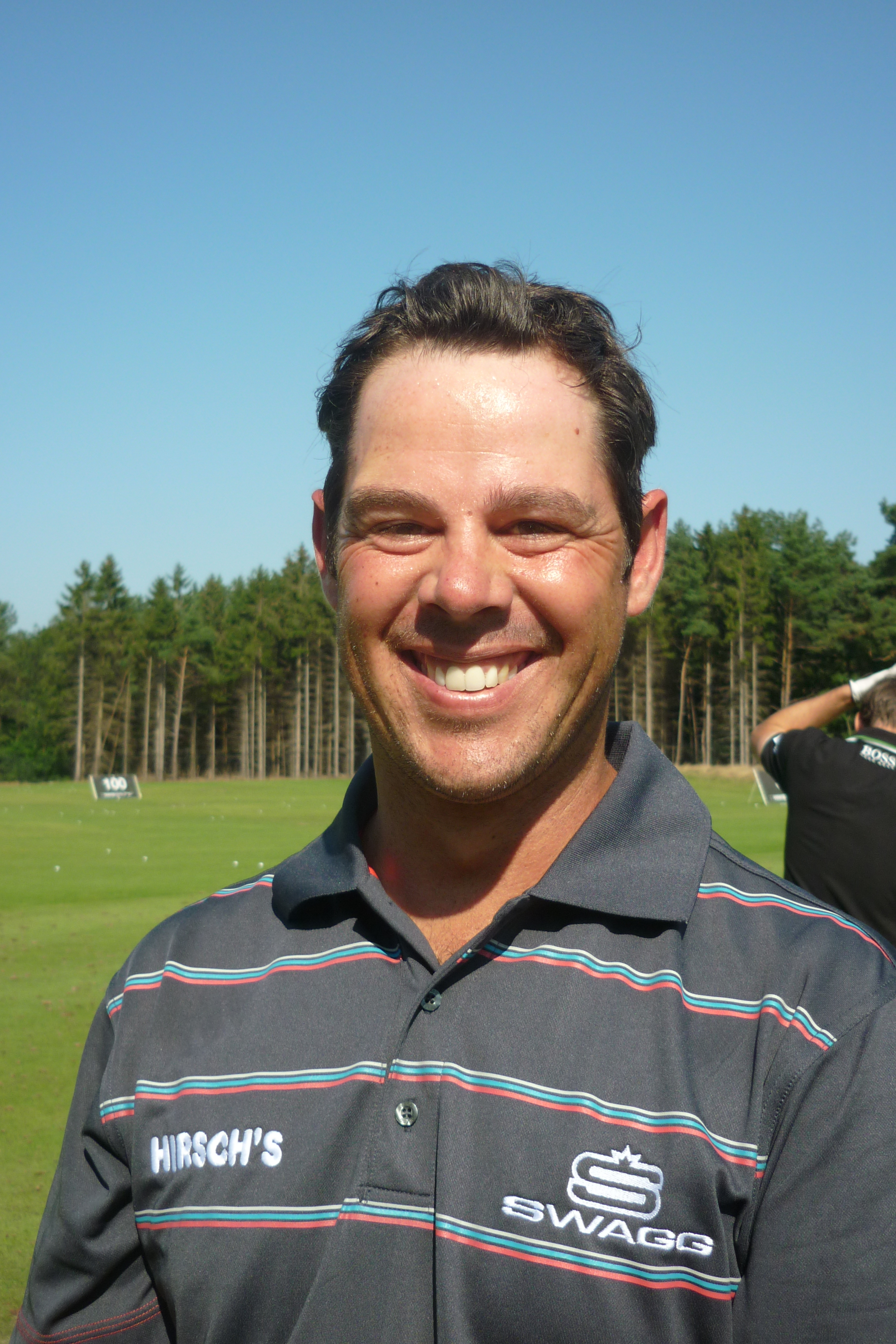

Personal information
- Full name: Jaco Phillipus van Zyl
- Nationality: South Africa
- Born: 23 February 1979 (age 47) Pretoria, South Africa
- Height: 1.80 m (5 ft 11 in)
- Weight: 80 kg (176 lb; 12 st 8 lb)
- Spouse: Jessica van Zyl (m. 2005)
- Children: 1

Career
- Sport: Golf
- Turned professional: 2001
- Current tours: European Tour; Sunshine Tour
- Former tour: PGA Tour
- Professional wins: 16
- Highest ranking: 49 (28 February 2016)

Number of wins by tour
- Sunshine Tour: 15
- Other: 1

Best results in major championships
- Masters Tournament: DNP
- PGA Championship: CUT: 2013
- U.S. Open: CUT: 2013, 2016
- The Open Championship: CUT: 2015

Jaco Phillipus van Zyl (born 23 February 1979) is a professional golfer from South Africa.

== Early life and amateur career ==
Van Zyl was born in Pretoria. He won the South African Amateur in 2000.

== Professional career ==
In 2001, Van Zyl turned professional. He immediately joined the Sunshine Tour. He won for the first time on the tour at the Platinum Classic in 2005.

In 2007, van Zyl played on the PGA Tour, having gained his card at the 2006 qualifying school. He made the 36-hole cut only four times in 21 tournaments during his rookie season and finished 227th on the money list.

In 2009, van Zyl recorded the biggest win of his career at the Telkom PGA Championship and went on to win twice more during the season and finish in 4th place on the Order of Merit. Having won four more tournaments on the Sunshine Tour in 2010, Van Zyl ended the year by finishing in 5th place at the final stage of the European Tour's qualifying school to earn his place on European Tour for the 2011 season. He had a good first season with five top-10 placings and finished 50th on the Race to Dubai. This included a playoff loss at the Trophée Hassan II in April. David Horsey beat van Zyl and Rhys Davies when he birdied the second extra hole of the playoff.

In November 2015, van Zyl finished runner-up at the Turkish Airlines Open. He placed one shot behind Victor Dubuisson, after being tied for the lead after 54 holes.

In February 2016, van Zyl reached the top 50 in the Official World Golf Ranking for the first time.

In January 2017, van Zyl was defeated in a sudden-death playoff on the European Tour for the second time. He lost to Wang Jeung-hun at the Commercial Bank Qatar Masters, who birdied the first extra hole to defeat van Zyl and Joakim Lagergren.

In September 2022, van Zyl won his first tournament in over six years at the Gary & Vivienne Player Challenge. He finished two shots ahead of Hennie Otto.

== Amateur wins ==
- 2000 South African Amateur

== Professional wins (16) ==
=== Sunshine Tour wins (15) ===
No.	Date	Tournament	Winning score	Margin of victory	Runner(s)-up
1	29 Oct 2005	Platinum Classic	−18 (67-65-66=198)	Playoff	(South Africa) Grant Muller
2	24 Oct 2008	Vodacom Origins of Golf Final	−2 (70-68-76=214)	1 stroke	(South Africa) Bradford Vaughan
3	22 Feb 2009	Telkom PGA Championship	−18 (70-68-66-66=270)	1 stroke	(Canada) Graham DeLaet, (South Africa) Trevor Fisher Jnr
4	9 May 2009	Samsung Royal Swazi Sun Open	65 pts (14-18-15-18=65)	12 points	(Zimbabwe) Tongoona Charamba, (South Africa) Tyrone van Aswegen
5	21 Aug 2009	Telkom PGA Pro-Am	−12 (68-70-66=204)	5 strokes	(Zimbabwe) Tongoona Charamba
6	1 May 2010	Vodacom Origins of Golf (2) at Sishen	−16 (65-68-67=200)	1 stroke	(South Africa) Jean Hugo, (South Africa) Jbe' Kruger
7	15 May 2010	Nashua Golf Challenge	−8 (68-71-69=208)	5 strokes	(South Africa) Jean Hugo, (South Africa) PH McIntyre
8	3 Sep 2010	Telkom PGA Pro-Am (2)	−15 (66-66-69=201)	1 stroke	(South Africa) Garth Mulroy
9	25 Sep 2010	SAA Pro-Am Invitational (2nd)	−22 (66-64-64=194)	8 strokes	(South Africa) Alex Haindl
10	9 Sep 2011	Telkom PGA Pro-Am (3)	−19 (67-66-64=197)	6 strokes	(South Africa) Jean Hugo
11	24 Feb 2013	Dimension Data Pro-Am	−17 (68-64-70-70=272)	1 stroke	(England) Daniel Brooks
12	17 Mar 2013	Telkom PGA Championship (2)	−20 (67-65-67-69=268)	1 stroke	(South Africa) Dylan Frittelli
13	24 Mar 2013	Investec Cup	−21 (66-64-69-68=267)	Playoff	(South Africa) Hennie Otto
14	28 Feb 2016	Eye of Africa PGA Championship (3)	−20 (68-67-66-67=268)	Playoff	(South Africa) Dean Burmester
15	10 Sep 2022	Gary & Vivienne Player Challenge	−14 (68-65-69=202)	2 strokes	(South Africa) Hennie Otto

Sunshine Tour playoff record (3–3)

No.	Year	Tournament	Opponent(s)	Result
1	2005	Platinum Classic	(South Africa) Grant Muller	Won with birdie on first extra hole
2	2010	SAA Pro-Am Invitational (3rd)	(South Africa) Michiel Bothma	Lost to par on second extra hole
3	2012	Lion of Africa Cape Town Open	(South Africa) Jake Roos, (South Africa) Tyrone van Aswegen, (South Africa) Mark Williams	Roos won with birdie on second extra hole van Zyl eliminated by par on first hole
4	2013	Investec Cup	(South Africa) Hennie Otto	Won with par on first extra hole
5	2015	Investec Cup	(South Africa) Jaco Ahlers	Lost to par on third extra hole
6	2016	Eye of Africa PGA Championship	(South Africa) Dean Burmester	Won with par on first extra hole

=== Other wins (1) ===
- 2003 Event 6 – State mines G.C. (Diners Club Tour)

== Playoff record ==
European Tour playoff record (0–2)

No.	Year	Tournament	Opponents	Result
1	2011	Trophée Hassan II	(Wales) Rhys Davies, (England) David Horsey	Horsey won with birdie on second extra hole
2	2017	Commercial Bank Qatar Masters	(Sweden) Joakim Lagergren, (South Korea) Wang Jeung-hun	Wang won with birdie on first extra hole

== Results in major championships ==
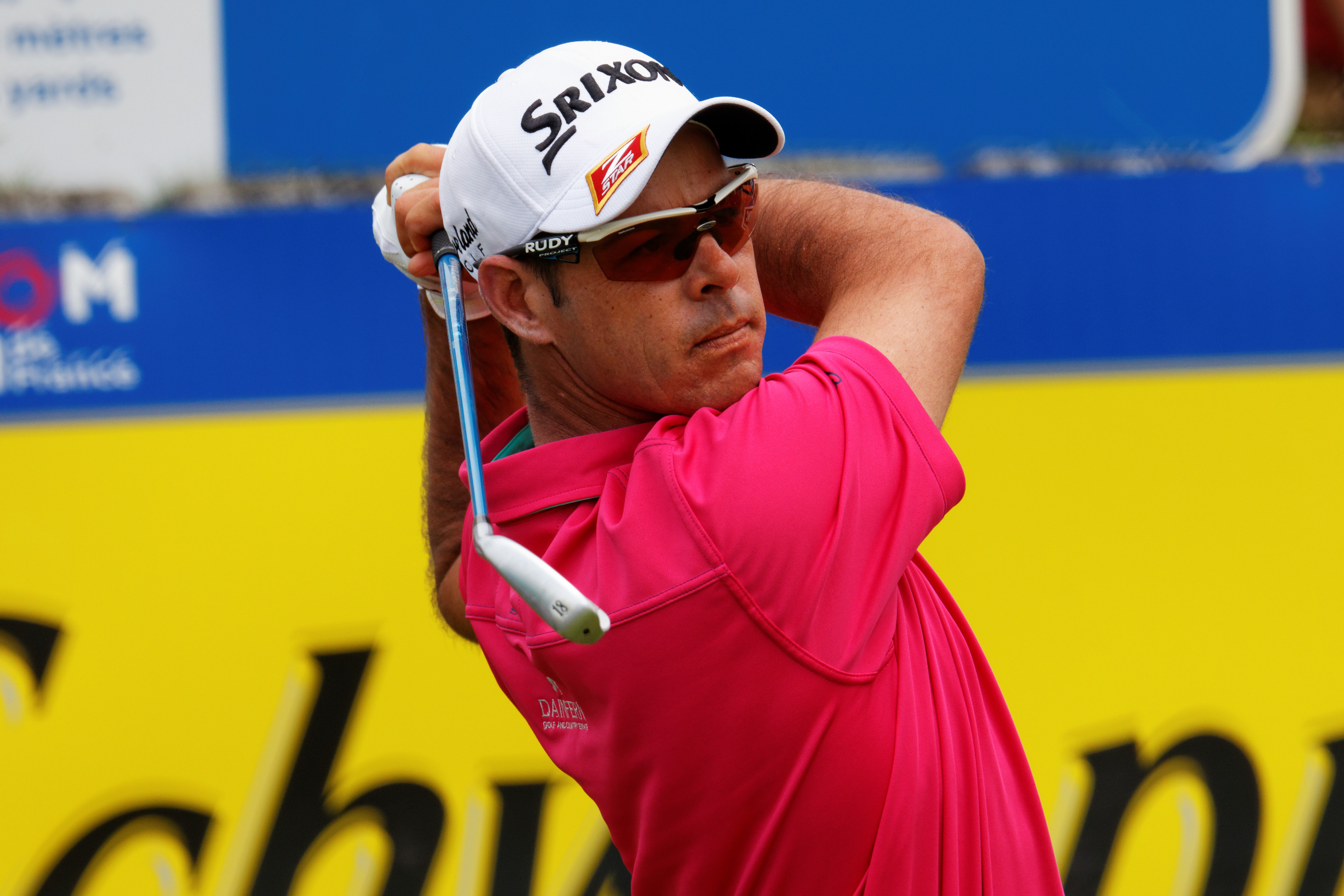
Open de France 2015

Tournament	2013	2014	2015	2016
Masters Tournament				
U.S. Open	CUT			CUT
The Open Championship			CUT	
PGA Championship	CUT			

Did not play

CUT = missed the half-way cut
"T" = tied

== Results in World Golf Championships ==
Results not in chronological order before 2015.

Tournament	2010	2011	2012	2013	2014	2015	2016
Championship							
Match Play							T28
Invitational				72			
Champions	T13		T56	T21	T73		

Did not play

QF, R16, R32, R64 = Round in which player lost in match play
"T" = tied

== Team appearances ==
Amateur

- Eisenhower Trophy (representing South Africa): 2000

Professional

- World Cup (representing South Africa): 2016

== See also ==
- 2006 PGA Tour Qualifying School graduates
- 2010 European Tour Qualifying School graduates
