= 2015 WGC-HSBC Champions =

Golf tournament

Coordinates: 31.109°N 121.216°E

Tournament information
- Dates: 5–8 November 2015
- Location: Shanghai, China
- Course: Sheshan Golf Club
- Tour(s): Asian Tour; European Tour; PGA Tour

Statistics
- Par: 72
- Length: 7,261 yards (6,639 m)
- Field: 78 players
- Cut: None
- Prize fund: $8,500,000
- Winner's share: $1,400,000

Champion
- (Scotland) Russell Knox
- 268 (−20)

Location in China

The 2015 WGC-HSBC Champions was a golf tournament played from 5–8 November 2015 at the Sheshan Golf Club in Shanghai, China. It was the seventh WGC-HSBC Champions tournament, and the fourth of four World Golf Championships events held in 2015.

Russell Knox won by 2 strokes from Kevin Kisner. Danny Willett had a last round 62 to finish joint third with Ross Fisher, a further stroke behind. Knox was playing in his first WGC event and became the first Scot to win a World Golf Championship. Knox had only earned entry as third alternate.

== Field ==
The following is a list of players who qualified for the 2015 WGC-HSBC Champions. The criteria for invitation differed from 2014, with a move towards the leaders in points lists rather than tournament winners. Players who qualify from multiple categories are listed in the first category in which they are eligible with the other qualifying categories in parentheses next to the player's name.

1. Winners of the four major championships and The Players Championship

Rickie Fowler (3,4), Jordan Spieth (3,4)

- Jason Day (3,4) and Zach Johnson (3,4) did not play

2. Winners of the previous four World Golf Championships

Dustin Johnson (3,4), Shane Lowry (3,5), Rory McIlroy (3,4,5), Bubba Watson (3,4)

3. Top 50 from the OWGR on 19 October

Kiradech Aphibarnrat (5), Daniel Berger (4), Paul Casey (4), Sergio García (5), Branden Grace (5), Emiliano Grillo, Thongchai Jaidee (5), Martin Kaymer (5), Chris Kirk, Kevin Kisner (4), Søren Kjeldsen (5), Anirban Lahiri (5), Danny Lee (4), Marc Leishman, David Lingmerth, Hunter Mahan, Hideki Matsuyama (4), Kevin Na (4), Louis Oosthuizen (4,5), Scott Piercy (4), Patrick Reed (4), Charl Schwartzel (5), Adam Scott, Henrik Stenson (4,5), Robert Streb (4), Andy Sullivan (5), Lee Westwood, Bernd Wiesberger (5), Danny Willett (5), Gary Woodland

- Jim Furyk (4), Bill Haas (4), Charley Hoffman (4), J. B. Holmes (4), Billy Horschel, Brooks Koepka (4), Matt Kuchar (4), Phil Mickelson, Ryan Palmer, Justin Rose (4,5), Brandt Snedeker (4), and Jimmy Walker (4) did not play

4. Top 30 from the final 2015 FedEx Cup points list (if there are less than five available players, players beyond 30th will be selected to increase the number to five)

Steven Bowditch, Harris English, Matt Jones, Daniel Summerhays, Justin Thomas

- Bae Sang-moon did not play due to military service

5. Top 30 from the Race to Dubai as of 26 October

An Byeong-hun, Luke Donald, Ross Fisher, Matt Fitzpatrick, Tommy Fleetwood, David Howell, Miguel Ángel Jiménez, James Morrison, Alex Norén, Thorbjørn Olesen, Thomas Pieters, Marc Warren, Chris Wood

- George Coetzee did not play

6. The leading four available players from the Asian Tour Order of Merit as of 26 October

Shiv Chawrasia, Andrew Dodt, Scott Hend, Richard T. Lee

7. The leading two available players from the Japan Golf Tour Order of Merit as of 26 October

Kim Kyung-tae, Satoshi Kodaira

- Yuta Ikeda did not play

8. The leading two available players from the final 2014 PGA Tour of Australasia Order of Merit

Greg Chalmers, Steven Jeffress

9. The leading two available players from the final 2014 Sunshine Tour Order of Merit

Thomas Aiken, Daniel van Tonder

10. Six players from China

Cao Yi, Dou Zecheng, Li Haotong, Liang Wenchong, Wu Ashun, Zhang Xinjun

11. Alternates, if needed to fill the field of 78 players

- The next available player on the Orders of Merit of the Asian Tour, Japan Golf Tour, Sunshine Tour, and PGA Tour of Australasia, ranked in order of their position in the OWGR as of 19 October
- Next available player, not otherwise exempt, from Race to Dubai as of 26 October, OWGR as of 19 October, FedEx Cup list:

1. Hiroshi Iwata (Japan)
2. Danny Chia (Asia)
3. Trevor Fisher Jnr (Sunshine)
4. Nick Cullen (Australasia)
5. Tyrrell Hatton (Race to Dubai; replaced George Coetzee)
6. Ian Poulter (OWGR; replaced Brandt Snedeker)
7. Russell Knox (FedEx Cup; replaced J. B. Holmes)
8. Cameron Smith (Asia; replaced Billy Horschel)

== Round summaries ==
=== First round ===
Thursday, 5 November 2015

Branden Grace shot a 9-under-par 63 to take a one-stroke lead over Steven Bowditch, Kevin Kisner, and Thorbjørn Olesen.

Place	Player	Score	To par
1	(South Africa) Branden Grace	63	−9
T2	(Australia) Steven Bowditch	64	−8
T2	(United States) Kevin Kisner	64	−8
T2	(Denmark) Thorbjørn Olesen	64	−8
T5	(United States) Dustin Johnson	65	−7
T5	(United States) Patrick Reed	65	−7
T5	(England) Danny Willett	65	−7
8	(China) Li Haotong	66	−6
T9	(England) Paul Casey	67	−5
T9	(United States) Harris English	67	−5
T9	(South Africa) Trevor Fisher Jnr	67	−5
T9	(England) Tommy Fleetwood	67	−5
T9	(Scotland) Russell Knox	67	−5
T9	(Belgium) Thomas Pieters	67	−5
T9	(China) Zhang Xinjun	67	−5

=== Second round ===
Friday, 6 November 2015

Kevin Kisner shot a second-round 66 to take a two stroke lead over Russell Knox, who shot the low round of the day, 65. First-round leader Branden Grace shot a 71 to fall to third place, four strokes behind Kisner. Li Haotong, of China, moved up the leaderboard to a tie for 4th with a second-round 69.

Place	Player	Score	To par
1	(United States) Kevin Kisner	64-66=130	−14
2	(Scotland) Russell Knox	67-65=132	−12
3	(South Africa) Branden Grace	63-71=134	−10
T4	(China) Li Haotong	66-69=135	−9
T4	(United States) Patrick Reed	66-70=135	−9
T6	(United States) Dustin Johnson	65-71=136	−8
T6	(United States) Hunter Mahan	68-68=136	−8
T6	(Austria) Bernd Wiesberger	70-66=136	−8
T9	(South Korea) An Byeong-hun	69-68=137	−7
T9	(England) Matt Fitzpatrick	68-69=137	−7
T9	(Australia) Scott Hend	68-69=137	−7
T9	(South Africa) Louis Oosthuizen	68-69=137	−7

=== Third round ===
Saturday, 7 November 2015
Sunday, 8 November 2015

Third round play did not finish Saturday due to Russell Knox choosing not to play the last hole due to darkness. When he finished his hole on Sunday, he was tied for the lead with Kevin Kisner at 16-under-par. They were one stroke ahead of Dustin Johnson and Li Haotong.

Place	Player	Score	To par
T1	(United States) Kevin Kisner	64-66-70=200	−16
T1	(Scotland) Russell Knox	67-65-68=200	−16
T3	(United States) Dustin Johnson	65-71-65=201	−15
T3	(China) Li Haotong	66-69-66=201	−15
T5	(England) Ross Fisher	69-69-65=203	−13
T5	(United States) Patrick Reed	65-70-68=203	−13
T5	(United States) Jordan Spieth	68-72-63=203	−13
T8	(South Africa) Branden Grace	63-71-70=204	−12
T8	(Australia) Scott Hend	68-69-67=204	−12
T8	(Denmark) Thorbjørn Olesen	64-74-66=204	−12

=== Final round ===
Sunday, 8 November 2015

Russell Knox shot a final round 68 to beat Kevin Kisner by two strokes. Li Haotong's T7 finish was the highest PGA Tour finish for a Chinese player.

Place	Player	Score	To par	Prize money (US$)
1	(Scotland) Russell Knox	67-65-68-68=268	−20	1,400,000
2	(United States) Kevin Kisner	64-66-70-70=270	−18	850,000
T3	(England) Ross Fisher	69-69-65-68=271	−17	422,500
T3	(England) Danny Willett	65-74-70-62=271	−17	422,500
T5	(South Africa) Branden Grace	63-71-70-68=272	−16	276,500
T5	(United States) Dustin Johnson	65-71-65-71=272	−16	276,500
T7	(England) Matt Fitzpatrick	68-69-69-67=273	−15	173,750
T7	(China) Li Haotong	66-69-66-72=273	−15	173,750
T7	(United States) Patrick Reed	65-70-68-70=273	−15	173,750
T7	(United States) Jordan Spieth	68-72-63-70=273	−15	173,750

==== Scorecard ====
Birdie	Bogey	Double bogey

Hole	1	2	3	4	5	6	7	8	9	10	11	12	13	14	15	16	17	18
Par	4	5	4	3	4	3	4	5	4	4	4	3	4	5	4	4	3	5
(Scotland) Knox	−16	−17	−18	−17	−17	−18	−18	−18	−17	−18	−19	−19	−19	−19	−19	−20	−20	−20
(United States) Kisner	−15	−15	−15	−15	−15	−16	−16	−17	−17	−17	−17	−17	−17	−17	−17	−17	−17	−18
(England) Fisher	−13	−14	−15	−15	−15	−15	−15	−16	−16	−17	−17	−17	−17	−17	−16	−16	−17	−17
(England) Willett	−8	−9	−10	−11	−11	−11	−11	−12	−13	−14	−14	−14	−15	−16	−16	−17	−17	−17
(South Africa) Grace	−12	−13	−14	−14	−13	−14	−15	−16	−16	−16	−17	−16	−16	−17	−16	−16	−15	−16
(United States) Johnson	−15	−16	−17	−16	−16	−16	−17	−15	−15	−14	−14	−14	−14	−15	−15	−16	−16	−16
(England) Fitzpatrick	−10	−11	−11	−11	−11	−12	−12	−12	−12	−12	−12	−12	−12	−13	−13	−14	−14	−15
(China) Li	−14	−12	−13	−12	−11	−12	−12	−13	−13	−13	−13	−13	−13	−13	−13	−14	−15	−15
(United States) Reed	−13	−14	−14	−14	−14	−14	−14	−15	−15	−15	−15	−15	−16	−14	−14	−14	−14	−15
(United States) Spieth	−12	−13	−13	−13	−12	−12	−12	−13	−13	−13	−13	−13	−13	−14	−14	−15	−15	−15

Cumulative tournament scores, relative to par
