= 2016 Ryder Cup =

Golf tournament held in the United States

Coordinates: 44.834°N 93.591°W

41st Ryder Cup Matches
- Dates: September 30 – October 2, 2016
- Venue: Hazeltine National Golf Club
- Location: Chaska, Minnesota
- Captains: Davis Love III (USA); Darren Clarke (Europe)
(United States)	17	11	(Europe)
- United States wins the Ryder Cup

Location map
- Location within Minnesota

The 41st Ryder Cup was hosted in the United States from September 30 to October 2, 2016, at the Hazeltine National Golf Club in Chaska, Minnesota. Europe entered as defending champions after winning the 2014 Ryder Cup, its third consecutive Ryder Cup win.

Team USA won the 41st Ryder Cup, having never trailed during the tournament. Ryan Moore defeated Lee Westwood by one hole to claim the cup with three matches still in progress. U.S. captain Davis Love III dedicated the win to Arnold Palmer, who died at age 87 five days before the competition. A bag from Palmer's captaincy in the 1975 Ryder Cup at Laurel Valley was placed on the first tee during Friday's opening foursomes to honor Palmer. Team USA swept the opening foursomes on Friday morning for the first time since 1975. Two days after the matches, most of Team USA attended Palmer's public memorial at Saint Vincent College in his hometown of Latrobe, Pennsylvania, and brought the trophy at the request of Palmer's daughter, Amy. A video tribute to Palmer was played at the opening ceremony and tributes to Palmer were included in remarks from Love and European captain Darren Clarke, and honorary captains Jack Nicklaus and Tony Jacklin.

== Format ==
The Ryder Cup is a match play event, with each match worth one point. The home captain chooses which matches are played in the morning and which are played in the afternoon.

=== Competition format ===
- Day 1 (Friday) – four foursome (alternate shot) matches and four fourball (better ball) matches
- Day 2 (Saturday) – four foursome matches and four fourball matches
- Day 3 (Sunday) – 12 singles matches

With a total of 28 points available, 14 1/2 points are required to win the cup, and 14 points are required for the defending champion, Europe, to retain the cup. All matches are played to a maximum of 18 holes.

== Course ==
On April 22, 2002, the PGA of America announced that Hazeltine National Golf Club would be the venue for the 2016 Ryder Cup. The PGA of America changed the regular sequence of the Hazeltine course for the 2016 Ryder Cup. Holes one through four and 14–18 constituted the front nine, while the back nine consisted of holes 10–13 and five through nine.

Hole	1	2	3	4	5	6	7	8	9	Out	10	11	12	13	14	15	16	17	18	In	Total
Yards	442	429	633	210	352	642	402	186	475	3,771	452	606	518	248	448	405	572	176	432	3,857	7,628
Par	4	4	5	3	4	5	4	3	4	36	4	5	4	3	4	4	5	3	4	36	72

== Television ==
The 2016 Ryder Cup was televised in the U.S. by Golf Channel and NBC, providing 170 hours of coverage. In the United Kingdom and Ireland, the event was broadcast by Sky Sports. The broadcaster re-branded its Sky Sports 4 channel as Sky Sports Ryder Cup for the week of the event, and broadcast 240 hours of coverage.

== Task Force ==
Following the European victory in the 2014 Ryder Cup, the PGA of America created a Ryder Cup Task Force consisting of three PGA officials and eight players with Ryder Cup experience. Included in the task force were previous Ryder Cup captains Raymond Floyd, Tom Lehman and Love, and players Rickie Fowler, Jim Furyk, Phil Mickelson, Steve Stricker and Tiger Woods. The task force selected the 2016 Ryder Cup captain and vice-captains, and determined the team selection process.

On February 24, 2015, the task force released its decisions. Love was selected as captain and new criteria was determined for the selection of vice-captains. The 11-person task force was disbanded after the announcement and replaced with a six-person Ryder Cup Committee which included Love, Mickelson and Woods.

== Team qualification and selection ==
=== United States ===
The United States qualification rules were announced by the Task Force on February 24, 2015. The majority of the team was selected from the Ryder Cup points list which was based on prize money won in important tournaments. Generally one point was awarded for every $1,000 earned. The team consisted of:

- The leading eight players on the Ryder Cup points list, gained in the following events
  - 2015 major championships
  - 2015 World Golf Championship events and The Players Championship (half points)
  - 2016 major championships (double points)
  - 2016 PGA Tour events. Qualifying events in this category were those played between January 1 and August 28, 2016, including The Barclays. "Alternate" events (those played opposite a major or WGC event) did not earn points
- Four captain's picks
  - Three announced after the 2016 BMW Championship, which concluded on September 11.
  - One announced after the 2016 Tour Championship, which concluded on September 25.

There were a number of changes from 2014. The number of captain's picks was increased from three to four with the selections being made later than previously, especially moving the fourth and last pick to less than a week before the Ryder Cup, right after the completion of the Tour Championship. The qualifying events included both the 2015 World Golf Championships events and The Players Championship, on top of the four 2015 major championships as in previous years, but only included 2016 PGA Tour events actually played in 2016, thus excluded any other event played in 2015. The qualifying period was also extended because the Olympic Games had moved the timeslot for the 2016 PGA Championship which took place already at the end of July.

The leading 15 players (and including the last captain's pick who was in 20th place) in the final points list were:

Position	Name	Points
1	Dustin Johnson	11975.111
2	Jordan Spieth	11400.143
3	Phil Mickelson	5919.636
4	Patrick Reed	5710.371
5	Jimmy Walker	5337.662
6	Brooks Koepka	4890.375
7	Brandt Snedeker	4432.539
8	Zach Johnson	4359.597
9	Bubba Watson	4210.011
10	J. B. Holmes	4179.466
11	Rickie Fowler	4079.528
12	Matt Kuchar	4035.220
13	Scott Piercy	3356.841
14	Bill Haas	3239.755
15	Jim Furyk	3032.852
...		
20	Ryan Moore	2877.193

Players in qualifying places are shown in green. Captain's picks are shown in yellow.

=== Europe ===
The European team qualification rules were announced on May 26, 2015. The basic qualification rules were unchanged from those for the 2014 event. The team consisted of:

- The leading four players on the Ryder Cup European Points List
  - Points earned in all Race to Dubai tournaments starting with the 2015 M2M Russian Open and ending with the 2016 Made in Denmark that finished on August 28, 2016.
- The leading five players, not qualified above, on the Ryder Cup World Points List
  - Total World Rankings Points earned in Official World Golf Ranking events starting on September 3, 2015 (the start date of the M2M Russian Open), and ending with the Made in Denmark tournament that finished on August 28, 2016, except that (i) all events in the week finishing on August 14, 2016 (the week of the men's Olympic tournament), were excluded and (ii) only the Made in Denmark tournament ending on August 28, 2016, was counted for that week. The Open de France was allocated Ryder Cup points based on the OWGR points scale for a tournament whose winner earns 64 OWGR points, though the winner actually only earned 42 OWGR points.
- Three captain's picks
  - Announced in the week starting August 29, 2016.

Only European members of the European Tour were eligible for the team and players could only earn points in the above two lists while they were a member of the European Tour. Paul Casey was not a member of the European Tour and was ineligible to earn points or be selected to the team. Russell Knox was not yet a member of the European Tour when he won the 2015 WGC-HSBC Champions. Two weeks after that win, he took up membership in order to try to qualify for the Ryder Cup, but the money and the approximately 90 OWGR points he had earned since the start of the qualification period did not count toward his Ryder Cup point totals. If these OWGR points had counted, he would have qualified easily by finishing fourth on the world ranking list; instead, he finished in tenth place, 12.36 OWGR points from automatic qualification, and was not selected as a captain's pick.

The leading players in the European Ryder Cup points lists were:

European points list
Position	Name	Points
1	Rory McIlroy (Q)	4,171,716.36
2	Danny Willett (Q)	4,059,360.67
3	Henrik Stenson (Q)	3,554,055.09
4	Chris Wood (Q)	2,593,023.46
5	Andy Sullivan (q)	2,472,016.00
6	Matt Fitzpatrick (q)	2,289,796.46
7	Rafa Cabrera-Bello (q)	2,191,913.62
8	Søren Kjeldsen	1,848,804.54
9	Thomas Pieters (P)	1,761,162.28
10	Tyrrell Hatton	1,688,068.41
11	Martin Kaymer (P)	1,676,848.54
12	Victor Dubuisson	1,675,632.53
13	Thorbjørn Olesen	1,628,788.97
14	Shane Lowry	1,535,713.87
15	Lee Westwood (P)	1,525,566.25

World points list
Position	Name	Points
1	Henrik Stenson (q)	380.31
2	Rory McIlroy (q)	319.97
3	Danny Willett (q)	271.99
4	Sergio García (Q)	207.95
5	Rafa Cabrera-Bello (Q)	179.42
6	Justin Rose (Q)	173.09
7	Chris Wood (q)	163.06
8	Andy Sullivan (Q)	153.80
9	Matt Fitzpatrick (Q)	153.58
10	Russell Knox	141.22
11	Thomas Pieters (P)	141.18
12	Søren Kjeldsen	121.19
13	Martin Kaymer (P)	120.90
14	Lee Westwood (P)	117.67
15	Tyrrell Hatton	114.35

Players in qualifying places (Q) are shown in green; captain's picks (P) are shown in yellow; those in italics (q) qualified through the other points list.

Sergio García and Justin Rose, who qualified through the World points list, finished in 17th and 26th place respectively on the European points list.

== Teams ==
=== Captains ===
Darren Clarke was named as the European captain on February 18, 2015. He was selected by a five-man selection panel consisting of the last three Ryder Cup captains: Paul McGinley, José María Olazábal, Colin Montgomerie, another ex-Ryder Cup player David Howell and the European Tour chief executive George O'Grady.

Davis Love III was named the United States captain on February 24, 2015. He had previously captained the 2012 team.

=== Vice-captains ===
Each captain selects a number of vice-captains to assist him during the tournament.

Clarke selected Thomas Bjørn, Pádraig Harrington, and Paul Lawrie as European team vice-captains in May 2016. He added Ian Poulter in June and Sam Torrance in July.

Tom Lehman was named as a United States vice-captain at the same press conference that Love was named as captain. In November 2015 three more vice-captains were named: Jim Furyk, Steve Stricker and Tiger Woods. All three had been members of the American Task Force. On September 27, 2016, Love selected Bubba Watson as the fifth vice-captain.

=== Players ===
Team USA
Name	Age	Points rank	World ranking	Previous Ryder Cups	Matches	W–L–H	Winning percentage
Dustin Johnson	32	1	2	2	7	4–3–0	57.14
Jordan Spieth	23	2	4	1	4	2–1–1	62.50
Phil Mickelson	46	3	15	10	41	16–19–6	46.34
Patrick Reed	26	4	8	1	4	3–0–1	87.50
Jimmy Walker	37	5	16	1	5	1–1–3	50.00
Brooks Koepka	26	6	22	0	Rookie		
Brandt Snedeker	35	7	23	1	3	1–2–0	33.33
Zach Johnson	40	8	28	4	14	6–6–2	50.00
J. B. Holmes	34	10	21	1	3	2–0–1	83.33
Rickie Fowler	27	11	9	2	8	0–3–5	31.25
Matt Kuchar	38	12	17	3	11	4–5–2	45.45
Ryan Moore	33	20	31	0	Rookie		

Captain's picks are shown in yellow. Davis Love III announced three captain's picks at 11:00 EDT on September 12. Ryan Moore was announced as the final captain's pick during halftime of the Sunday night NFL game on September 25. The world rankings and records are at the start of the 2016 Ryder Cup.

Team Europe
Name	Country	Age	Points rank (European)	Points rank (World)	World ranking	Previous Ryder Cups	Matches	W–L–H	Winning percentage
Rory McIlroy	Northern Ireland	27	1	2	3	3	14	6–4–4	57.14
Danny Willett	England	28	2	3	10	0	Rookie		
Henrik Stenson	Sweden	40	3	1	5	3	11	5–4–2	54.55
Chris Wood	England	28	4	7	32	0	Rookie		
Sergio García	Spain	36	17	4	12	7	32	18–9–5	64.06
Rafa Cabrera-Bello	Spain	32	7	5	30	0	Rookie		
Justin Rose	England	36	26	6	11	3	14	9–3–2	71.43
Andy Sullivan	England	29	5	8	50	0	Rookie		
Matt Fitzpatrick	England	22	6	9	44	0	Rookie		
Lee Westwood	England	43	15	14	46	9	41	20–15–6	56.10
Martin Kaymer	Germany	31	11	13	48	3	10	4–3–3	55.00
Thomas Pieters	Belgium	24	9	11	42	0	Rookie		

Darren Clarke announced the three captain's picks at 12.30 BST on August 30. Captain's picks are shown in yellow. The world rankings and records are at the start of the 2016 Ryder Cup.

== Friday's matches ==
The tournament began with the alternate shot foursomes in the morning followed by four fourball matches in the afternoon. The pairings for the foursomes were announced on Thursday September 29.

=== Morning foursomes ===
Team USA swept the morning foursomes. It was the first time since 1975 that they had swept the opening session and the first time since 1981 that they had swept any session.

	Results
Stenson/Rose	(United States) 3 & 2	Spieth/Reed
McIlroy/Sullivan	(United States) 1 up	Mickelson/Fowler
García/Kaymer	(United States) 4 & 2	Walker/Z. Johnson
Westwood/Pieters	(United States) 5 & 4	D. Johnson/Kuchar
0	Session	4
0	Overall	4

=== Afternoon fourballs ===
	Results
Rose/Stenson	(Europe) 5 & 4	Spieth/Reed
García/Cabrera-Bello	(Europe) 3 & 2	Holmes/Moore
Kaymer/Willett	(United States) 5 & 4	Snedeker/Koepka
McIlroy/Pieters	(Europe) 3 & 2	D. Johnson/Kuchar
3	Session	1
3	Overall	5

== Saturday's matches ==
=== Morning foursomes ===
	Results
McIlroy/Pieters	(Europe) 4 & 2	Fowler/Mickelson
Stenson/Fitzpatrick	(United States) 3 & 2	Snedeker/Koepka
Rose/Wood	(Europe) 1 up	Walker/Z. Johnson
García/Cabrera-Bello	halved	Reed/Spieth
2 1/2	Session	1 1/2
5 1/2	Overall	6 1/2

=== Afternoon fourballs ===
Patrick Reed and Jordan Spieth played together for the fourth time in the 2016 Ryder Cup and, having been paired together three times in 2014, became the first American pairing to play seven matches. By winning their match they also equaled the American record of 5 points set by Gardner Dickinson and Arnold Palmer in 1967 and 1971.

	Results
McIlroy/Pieters	(Europe) 3 & 1	Koepka/D. Johnson
Willett/Westwood	(United States) 1 up	Holmes/Moore
Kaymer/García	(United States) 2 & 1	Mickelson/Kuchar
Rose/Stenson	(United States) 2 & 1	Reed/Spieth
1	Session	3
6 1/2	Overall	9 1/2

== Sunday's singles matches ==
The deciding moment for Team USA reaching 14 1/2 points to clinch victory belonged to Ryan Moore who defeated Lee Westwood on the 18th green. Thomas Pieters became the first European rookie to score 4 points, beating the previous record of 3 1/2 set by Paul Way in 1983 and by Sergio García and Paul Lawrie in 1999.

	Results		Timetable
Rory McIlroy	(United States) 1 up	Patrick Reed	2nd: 7 1/2–10 1/2
Henrik Stenson	(Europe) 3 & 2	Jordan Spieth	1st: 7 1/2–9 1/2
Thomas Pieters	(Europe) 3 & 2	J. B. Holmes	3rd: 8 1/2–10 1/2
Justin Rose	(United States) 1 up	Rickie Fowler	5th: 9 1/2–11 1/2
Rafa Cabrera-Bello	(Europe) 3 & 2	Jimmy Walker	4th: 9 1/2–10 1/2
Sergio García	halved	Phil Mickelson	7th: 10–13
Lee Westwood	(United States) 1 up	Ryan Moore	9th: 10–15
Andy Sullivan	(United States) 3 & 1	Brandt Snedeker	8th: 10–14
Chris Wood	(United States) 1 up	Dustin Johnson	11th: 10–17
Danny Willett	(United States) 5 & 4	Brooks Koepka	6th: 9 1/2–12 1/2
Martin Kaymer	(Europe) 1 up	Matt Kuchar	12th: 11–17
Matt Fitzpatrick	(United States) 4 & 3	Zach Johnson	10th: 10–16
4 1/2	Session	7 1/2
11	Overall	17

== Individual player records ==
Each entry refers to the win–loss–half record of the player.

=== United States ===
Player	Points	Matches	Overall	Singles	Foursomes	Fourballs
Rickie Fowler	2	3	2–1–0	1–0–0	1–1–0	0–0–0
J. B. Holmes	1	3	1–2–0	0–1–0	0–0–0	1–1–0
Dustin Johnson	2	4	2–2–0	1–0–0	1–0–0	0–2–0
Zach Johnson	2	3	2–1–0	1–0–0	1–1–0	0–0–0
Brooks Koepka	3	4	3–1–0	1–0–0	1–0–0	1–1–0
Matt Kuchar	2	4	2–2–0	0–1–0	1–0–0	1–1–0
Phil Mickelson	2.5	4	2–1–1	0–0–1	1–1–0	1–0–0
Ryan Moore	2	3	2–1–0	1–0–0	0–0–0	1–1–0
Patrick Reed	3.5	5	3–1–1	1–0–0	1–0–1	1–1–0
Brandt Snedeker	3	3	3–0–0	1–0–0	1–0–0	1–0–0
Jordan Spieth	2.5	5	2–2–1	0–1–0	1–0–1	1–1–0
Jimmy Walker	1	3	1–2–0	0–1–0	1–1–0	0–0–0

=== Europe ===
Player	Points	Matches	Overall	Singles	Foursomes	Fourballs
Rafa Cabrera-Bello	2.5	3	2–0–1	1–0–0	0–0–1	1–0–0
Matt Fitzpatrick	0	2	0–2–0	0–1–0	0–1–0	0–0–0
Sergio García	2	5	1–2–2	0–0–1	0–1–1	1–1–0
Martin Kaymer	1	4	1–3–0	1–0–0	0–1–0	0–2–0
Rory McIlroy	3	5	3–2–0	0–1–0	1–1–0	2–0–0
Thomas Pieters	4	5	4–1–0	1–0–0	1–1–0	2–0–0
Justin Rose	2	5	2–3–0	0–1–0	1–1–0	1–1–0
Henrik Stenson	2	5	2–3–0	1–0–0	0–2–0	1–1–0
Andy Sullivan	0	2	0–2–0	0–1–0	0–1–0	0–0–0
Lee Westwood	0	3	0–3–0	0–1–0	0–1–0	0–1–0
Danny Willett	0	3	0–3–0	0–1–0	0–0–0	0–2–0
Chris Wood	1	2	1–1–0	0–1–0	1–0–0	0–0–0
