= 2018 World Cup of Golf =

Tournament information
- Dates: 22–25 November
- Location: South Oakleigh, Australia; 37.91°S 145.09°E
- Course: Metropolitan Golf Club
- Format: 72 holes stroke play four-ball & alternate shot

Statistics
- Par: 72
- Length: 7,321 yards (6,694 m)
- Field: 28 two-man teams
- Prize fund: $7.0 million
- Winner's share: $2.24 million

Champion
- Belgium; Thomas Pieters & Thomas Detry
- 265 (−23)

Location map
- Location in Australia Location in Victoria Location in Melbourne

The 2018 World Cup of Golf (known as the 2018 ISPS Handa Melbourne World Cup of Golf for sponsorship reasons) was a golf tournament that was played from 22 to 25 November at Metropolitan Golf Club in South Oakleigh, Victoria, Australia. It was the 59th World Cup. The format is 72-hole stroke play; the first and third days were four-ball (best ball), and the second and fourth days were foursomes (alternate shot) play.

The Belgian pair of Thomas Pieters and Thomas Detry won with a score of 265, 23-under-par. Australia and Mexico tied for second place, three strokes behind. It was Belgium's first victory in the World Cup.

== Qualification ==
The 28 nations to compete were determined based on the top-ranked player from each country from the Official World Golf Ranking as of 3 September 2018.

These 28 seeded players selected a partner from the same country ranked in the top 500 of the OWGR. If there were less than five possible choices in the top 500, the seeded player could choose any of the next five players from that country in the rankings, even if they were ranked outside the top 500. The deadline for teams to be finalized was 20 September.

== Teams ==
The table below lists the teams in order of qualification (i.e. ranking of seeded player on 3 September 2018) together with their World Rankings at the time of the tournament.

Country	Seeded player	Unseeded player
Australia	Marc Leishman (21)	Cameron Smith (33)
England	Tyrrell Hatton (25)	Ian Poulter (39)
United States	Kyle Stanley (30)	Matt Kuchar (29)
Thailand	Kiradech Aphibarnrat (36)	Prom Meesawat (488)
Denmark	Thorbjørn Olesen (42)	Søren Kjeldsen (231)
Japan	Satoshi Kodaira (54)	Hideto Tanihara (165)
South Korea	An Byeong-hun (50)	Kim Si-woo (57)
China	Li Haotong (40)	Wu Ashun (177)
Canada	Adam Hadwin (65)	Nick Taylor (313)
Scotland	Russell Knox (67)	Martin Laird (186)
Belgium	Thomas Pieters (70)	Thomas Detry (140)
South Africa	Dylan Frittelli (75)	Erik van Rooyen (135)
Sweden	Alexander Björk (63)	Joakim Lagergren (188)
New Zealand	Ryan Fox (89)	Mark Brown (496)
Venezuela	Jhonattan Vegas (107)	Joseph Naffah (2012)
Spain	Adrián Otaegui (69)	Jorge Campillo (99)
Ireland	Shane Lowry (74)	Paul Dunne (106)
France	Alexander Lévy (95)	Mike Lorenzo-Vera (115)
Netherlands	Joost Luiten (110)	Daan Huizing (320)
India	Anirban Lahiri (139)	Gaganjeet Bhullar (137)
Finland	Mikko Korhonen (108)	Mikko Ilonen (310)
Mexico	Abraham Ancer (60)	Roberto Díaz (742)
Germany	Martin Kaymer (159)	Maximilian Kieffer (291)
Italy	Andrea Pavan (103)	Renato Paratore (227)
Zimbabwe	Scott Vincent (148)	Benjamin Follett-Smith (919)
Malaysia	Gavin Green (198)	Ben Leong (397)
Wales	Stuart Manley (242)	Bradley Dredge (466)
Greece	Peter Karmis (248)	Alexander Tranacher (2012)

The following players were eligible to be a seeded player but did not commit. The order is based on the World Rankings on 3 September 2018. Five countries with an eligible player did not compete: Argentina, Austria, Chinese Taipei, Chile and Paraguay (withdrew as alternate). They were replaced by Zimbabwe, Malaysia, Wales and Greece.

- (United States) Dustin Johnson
- (United States) Brooks Koepka
- (United States) Justin Thomas
- (England) Justin Rose
- (Spain) Jon Rahm
- (Italy) Francesco Molinari
- (United States) Bryson DeChambeau
- (Republic of Ireland) Rory McIlroy
- (United States) Rickie Fowler
- (United States) Jordan Spieth
- (Australia) Jason Day
- (England) Tommy Fleetwood
- (United States) Bubba Watson
- (United States) Patrick Reed
- (Sweden) Alex Norén
- (England) Paul Casey
- (United States) Tony Finau
- (Japan) Hideki Matsuyama
- (United States) Webb Simpson
- (United States) Xander Schauffele
- (Sweden) Henrik Stenson
- (United States) Patrick Cantlay
- (United States) Phil Mickelson
- (United States) Tiger Woods
- (Spain) Rafa Cabrera-Bello
- (Spain) Sergio García
- (South Africa) Louis Oosthuizen
- (South Africa) Branden Grace
- (Argentina) Emiliano Grillo
- (South Africa) Charl Schwartzel
- (Austria) Bernd Wiesberger
- (India) Shubhankar Sharma
- (Chinese Taipei) Pan Cheng-tsung
- (Chile) Joaquín Niemann
- (Paraguay) Fabrizio Zanotti

== Final leaderboard ==
Australia, England and South Korea tied for the lead after the first day fourball rounds with 10-under-par rounds of 62. Conditions were difficult for the second day foursomes with rain and gusty winds. Belgium and South Korea led after day 2 on 10-under-par. Mexico had the best round of the day, 70, to lift themselves into 7th place while hosts Australia had a disappointing round of 76 and dropped into a tie for 8th place. On the third day Belgium had their second fourball round of 63 and took a 5-stroke lead, ahead of Italy, Mexico and South Korea. On the final day Australia set the clubhouse lead on 268 after a final round 65. Belgium came to the last with a two-stroke lead. Thomas Pieters put their second shot to four feet, which Thomas Detry holed to give Belgium a three-stroke victory with a final round of 68. Mexico tied with Australia for second place.

Place	Country	Score	To par	Money (US$)
1	Belgium	63-71-63-68=265	−23	2,240,000
T2	Australia	62-76-65-65=268	−20	957,500
T2	Mexico	67-70-65-66=268	−20	957,500
T4	Canada	68-73-64-66=271	−17	362,000
T4	Denmark	63-77-66-65=271	−17	362,000
T6	Italy	65-71-66-70=272	−16	252,500
T6	South Korea	62-72-68-70=272	−16	252,500
8	England	62-74-67-70=273	−15	185,000
9	Sweden	65-74-64-71=274	−14	140,000
T10	France	66-73-68-69=276	−12	102,333
T10	India	64-72-70-70=276	−12	102,333
T10	Ireland	64-76-65-71=276	−12	102,333
13	China	66-76-68-67=277	−11	82,000
T14	Scotland	67-71-67-73=278	−10	74,000
T14	Thailand	67-78-67-66=278	−10	74,000
T16	United States	66-79-66-68=279	−9	69,000
T16	Wales	70-73-66-70=279	−9	69,000
T18	Finland	66-75-68-71=280	−8	64,000
T18	New Zealand	65-76-69-70=280	−8	64,000
T18	South Africa	66-76-66-72=280	−8	64,000
21	Spain	68-74-64-75=281	−7	60,000
22	Malaysia	63-73-72-74=282	−6	58,000
23	Japan	66-79-70-72=287	−1	56,000
T24	Netherlands	69-82-68-70=289	+1	53,000
T24	Venezuela	65-82-67-75=289	+1	53,000
26	Germany	68-81-68-73=290	+2	50,000
27	Zimbabwe	72-84-66-73=295	+7	48,000
28	Greece	66-87-68-86=307	+19	46,000

Rounds 1 and 3 were four-ball (best ball), rounds 2 and 4 were foursomes (alternate shot). Prize money is for the pair.
