= Russell Knox =

Scottish professional golfer (born 1985)

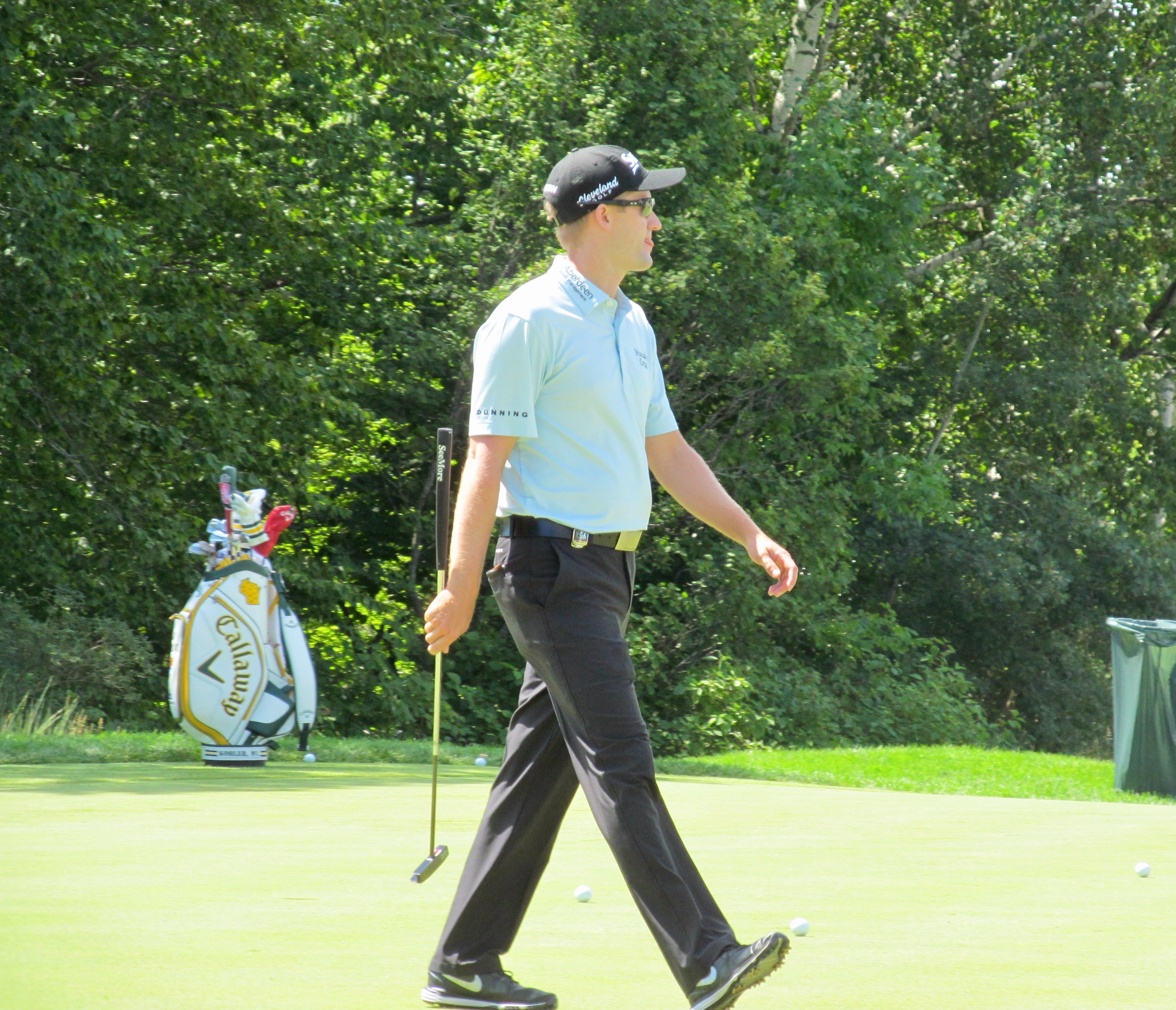
- Knox at the 2015 PGA Championship

Personal information
- Full name: Russell Colin Knox
- Nickname: Roo
- Nationality: Scotland
- Born: 21 June 1985 (age 41) Inverness, Scotland
- Height: 5 ft 10 in (1.78 m)
- Weight: 155 lb (70 kg; 11.1 st)

Career
- Sport: Golf
- College: Jacksonville University
- Turned professional: 2007
- Current tour: Korn Ferry Tour
- Former tours: PGA Tour; European Tour eGolf Professional Tour
- Professional wins: 7
- Highest ranking: 18 (7 August 2016)

Number of wins by tour
- PGA Tour: 2
- European Tour: 2
- Korn Ferry Tour: 1
- Other: 3

Best results in major championships
- Masters Tournament: CUT: 2016, 2017
- PGA Championship: T22: 2016
- U.S. Open: T12: 2018
- The Open Championship: T30: 2016

Russell Colin Knox (born 21 June 1985) is a Scottish professional golfer who plays on the Korn Ferry Tour.

He had considerable success from 2014 to 2016 during which time he won the 2015 WGC-HSBC Champions and the 2016 Travelers Championship. Together with three runner-up finishes and three third-places on the PGA Tour, he was a runner-up in the 2016 Dubai Duty Free Irish Open and reached a career-high 18 in the world rankings at the end of 2016. Knox joined the European Tour at the start of 2016 but just failed to gain an automatic place on the 2016 Ryder Cup team and was not chosen as one of the captain's picks.

== Personal life ==
Knox was born in Inverness, Scotland. His father was born in San Diego, California. He attended Culloden Academy. Knox signed with the sports scholarship agency FirstPoint USA in 2002 and helped Knox to secure a golf scholarship in 2003 at Jacksonville University, Florida. He married former tennis player Andrea Hernandez in April 2014.

== Professional career ==
Knox turned professional in 2007. He played on the NGA Hooters Tour from 2008 to 2010, picking up two victories in the process. He joined the Nationwide Tour in 2011 and picked up his first victory on tour in July at the Chiquita Classic. He eventually finished 12th on the Nationwide Tour money list and gained his full PGA Tour card. His first PGA Tour event was the 2011 Transitions Championship but he failed to make the cut. His first PGA Tour event as a full member was the 2012 Sony Open in Hawaii where he missed the cut by a single stroke. He made only 12 cuts in 23 events in 2012 and finished 143rd on the money list to remain conditionally exempt on the PGA Tour for 2013. On 26 July 2013, Knox shot a 59 in the second round of the Albertsons Boise Open on the Web.com Tour. He split his time between the PGA Tour and Web.com Tours in 2013. He played in the Web.com Tour Finals and finished 20th to earn his PGA Tour card for 2014.

After an impressive start to his 2014 PGA Tour season, Knox came close to winning his maiden PGA Tour title at the Honda Classic, eventually losing to Russell Henley in a four-man playoff that also included Rory McIlroy and Ryan Palmer. Knox finished 48th in the regular season FedEx Cup points list, qualifying for the 2014 FedEx Cup Playoffs, eventually finishing in 40th place.

Knox had a good start to the 2015 PGA Tour season with a third place in the Shriners Hospitals for Children Open in late 2014. He finished tied for third in 2015 The Honda Classic and made the cut in 20 PGA Tour events. Finishing 44th in the regular season FedEx Cup points list, he qualified for the 2015 FedEx Cup Playoffs. Good performances in The Barclays and Deutsche Bank Championship lifted him to 29th place in the FedEx Cup standing but he only finished tied for 45th in BMW Championship to drop out of the top 30 in the standings and so missed out on the Tour Championship. Knox also made a rare appearance in Europe at the 2015 Aberdeen Asset Management Scottish Open, finishing in a tie for 10th place.

In November 2015, Knox won the 2015 WGC-HSBC Champions by two strokes from Kevin Kisner. Knox was playing in his first WGC event and became the first Scot to win a World Golf Championship. Knox only qualified for the tournament as seventh reserve and third alternate. The win lifted him to 31st in the World Rankings, his first time in the world top 50 and earned him place in the 2016 Masters. The week after his WGC success, Knox lost in a three-way playoff in the OHL Classic at Mayakoba, Graeme McDowell making a birdie at the first extra hole. Knox missed the cut on his Masters debut but responded one week later with a runner-up finish at the RBC Heritage, where he finished two shots behind winner Branden Grace. Knox won the Travelers Championship in August 2016 and was fourth in the regular season FedEx Cup points list, finishing the 2016 FedEx Cup Playoffs in 10th place.

Knox became a European Tour member at the start of the 2016 season in the hope of playing for Europe in the 2016 Ryder Cup. Knox just failed to gain an automatic place on the Ryder Cup team, the points from his WGC win were not retrospectively added, and was not chosen as one of the captain's picks. As a European Tour member, Knox was committed to playing more events on the tour. One of these was the Dubai Duty Free Irish Open where he was joint runner-up behind Rory McIlroy. Knox had three top-10 finishes in late 2016 and finished the year at a career-high 18 in the world rankings.

2017 was a disappointing season in comparison to the three previous years with a best place finish of fifth place in the 2017 WGC-Bridgestone Invitational. Knox finished 60th the regular season FedEx Cup points list, finishing the 2017 FedEx Cup Playoffs in 71st place.

Knox had a series of good results in the summer of 2018. He qualified for the 2018 U.S. Open and finished tied for 12th place, his best finish in a major championship. Two weeks later he was joint runner-up in the HNA Open de France and the following week he won the Dubai Duty Free Irish Open beating Ryan Fox in a playoff. The results lifted him back into world top 50.

In March 2019, Knox became the first-ever player to have an albatross in the history of the Valspar Championship.

== Professional wins (7) ==
=== PGA Tour wins (2) ===
Legend
World Golf Championships (1)
Other PGA Tour (1)

No.	Date	Tournament	Winning score	Margin of victory	Runner-up
1	8 Nov 2015	WGC-HSBC Champions	−20 (67-65-68-68=268)	2 strokes	(United States) Kevin Kisner
2	7 Aug 2016	Travelers Championship	−14 (67-67-64-68=266)	1 stroke	(United States) Jerry Kelly

PGA Tour playoff record (0–2)

No.	Year	Tournament	Opponents	Result
1	2014	The Honda Classic	(United States) Russell Henley, (Northern Ireland) Rory McIlroy, (United States) Ryan Palmer	Henley won with birdie on first extra hole
2	2015	OHL Classic at Mayakoba	(United States) Jason Bohn, (Northern Ireland) Graeme McDowell	McDowell won with birdie on first extra hole

=== European Tour wins (2) ===
Legend
World Golf Championships (1)
Race to Dubai finals series (1) (Note: The 2015 WGC-HSBC Champions was also a Race to Dubai finals series tournament.)
Rolex Series (1)
Other European Tour (0)

No.	Date	Tournament	Winning score	Margin of victory	Runner-up
1	8 Nov 2015	WGC-HSBC Champions	−20 (67-65-68-68=268)	2 strokes	(United States) Kevin Kisner
2	8 Jul 2018	Dubai Duty Free Irish Open	−14 (71-69-68-66=274)	Playoff	(New Zealand) Ryan Fox

European Tour playoff record (1–0)

No.	Year	Tournament	Opponent	Result
1	2018	Dubai Duty Free Irish Open	(New Zealand) Ryan Fox	Won with birdie on first extra hole

=== Nationwide Tour wins (1) ===
No.	Date	Tournament	Winning score	Margin of victory	Runner-up
1	17 Jul 2011	Chiquita Classic	−25 (68-66-63-66=263)	3 strokes	(United States) Billy Hurley III

=== NGA Hooters Tour wins (2) ===
- 2009 Silver Star Hotel & Casino Golf Classic
- 2010 Gold Strike Casino Classic

=== eGolf Professional Tour wins (1) ===
No.	Date	Tournament	Winning score	Margin of victory	Runners-up
1	20 Feb 2010	Palmetto Hall Championship	−8 (73-68-69-70=280)	3 strokes	(United States) Matt Cannon, (United States) David Sanchez

== Results in major championships ==
Results not in chronological order in 2020.

Tournament	2013	2014	2015	2016	2017	2018
Masters Tournament				CUT	CUT	
U.S. Open	T45			T23	CUT	T12
The Open Championship			CUT	T30	CUT	CUT
PGA Championship		CUT	CUT	T22	CUT	T35

Tournament	2019	2020	2021	2022
Masters Tournament				
PGA Championship	CUT			CUT
U.S. Open				
The Open Championship	T41	NT		

Did not play

CUT = missed the halfway cut
"T" indicates a tie for a place.
NT = No tournament due to COVID-19 pandemic

=== Summary ===
Tournament	Wins	2nd	3rd	Top-5	Top-10	Top-25	Events	Cuts made
Masters Tournament	0	0	0	0	0	0	2	0
PGA Championship	0	0	0	0	0	1	7	2
U.S. Open	0	0	0	0	0	2	4	3
The Open Championship	0	0	0	0	0	0	5	2
Totals	0	0	0	0	0	3	18	7

- Most consecutive cuts made – 3 (2016 U.S. Open – 2016 PGA)
- Longest streak of top-10s – 0

== Results in The Players Championship ==
Tournament	2014	2015	2016	2017	2018	2019	2020	2021	2022	2023
The Players Championship	T34	T17	T19	CUT	CUT	T35	C	T67	T6	CUT

Top 10

CUT = missed the halfway cut
"T" indicates a tie for a place
C = Cancelled after the first round due to the COVID-19 pandemic

== World Golf Championships ==
=== Wins (1) ===
Year	Championship	54 holes	Winning score	Margin	Runner-up
2015	WGC-HSBC Champions	Tied for lead	−20 (67-65-68-68=268)	2 strokes	(United States) Kevin Kisner

=== Results timeline ===
Tournament	2015	2016	2017	2018	2019
Championship		27	70		T39
Match Play		T28	T39		T40
Invitational		54	T5	T48	
Champions	1	T9		68	

Win
Top 10
Did not play

QF, R16, R32, R64 = Round in which player lost in match play
"T" = tied

== Team appearances ==
Amateur

- European Youths' Team Championship (representing Scotland): 2006

Professional

- World Cup (representing Scotland): 2016, 2018

== See also ==
- 2011 Nationwide Tour graduates
- 2013 Web.com Tour Finals graduates
- Lowest rounds of golf
