= 2015 European Tour =

Golf tour season

2015 European Tour season
- Duration: 4 December 2014 – 22 November 2015
- Number of official events: 48
- Most wins: (Northern Ireland) Rory McIlroy (3) (England) Andy Sullivan (3)
- Race to Dubai: (Northern Ireland) Rory McIlroy
- Golfer of the Year: (Northern Ireland) Rory McIlroy
- Players' Player of the Year: (Northern Ireland) Rory McIlroy
- Sir Henry Cotton Rookie of the Year: (South Korea) An Byeong-hun
- Graduate of the Year: (South Korea) An Byeong-hun

The 2015 European Tour was the 44th season of the European Tour, the main professional golf tour in Europe since its inaugural season in 1972.

== Changes for 2015 ==
There were many changes from the previous season. There were six additions to the schedule, made up of four new tournaments: the True Thailand Classic, the Shenzhen International, the Saltire Energy Paul Lawrie Match Play, and the AfrAsia Bank Mauritius Open; the Hero Indian Open, which was co-sanctioned by the European Tour for the first time; and the return of the European Open, which was last played in 2009.

Seven events were lost from the schedule: the Volvo World Match Play Championship and Volvo Golf Champions, as a result of Volvo reducing their sponsorship commitments; the Nelson Mandela Championship; the NH Collection Open; The Championship at Laguna National; the Wales Open, as a 15-year deal with Celtic Manor Resort came to an end; and the Perth International, which wasn't played in 2015 due to rescheduling from October to February.

In March, the tour confirmed that the British Masters, last held in 2008, was also being revived and added to the schedule. Later in the month, the Madeira Islands Open was cancelled due to persistent heavy rain; it was later rescheduled to the end of July, opposite the Saltire Energy Paul Lawrie Match Play.

== Schedule ==
The following table lists official events during the 2015 season.

Date	Tournament	Host country	Purse	Winner (Note: The number in brackets after each winner's name is the number of European Tour events they had won up to and including that tournament. This information is only shown for European Tour members.)	OWGR points	Other tours (Note: AFR − Sunshine Tour; ANZ − PGA Tour of Australasia; ASA − Asian Tour; CHA − Challenge Tour; ONE − OneAsia Tour.)	Notes
7 Dec	Nedbank Golf Challenge	South Africa	US$6,500,000	(England) Danny Willett (2)	38	AFR	Limited-field event
14 Dec	Alfred Dunhill Championship	South Africa	€1,500,000	(South Africa) Branden Grace (5)	22	AFR	
11 Jan	South African Open Championship	South Africa	R14,000,000	(England) Andy Sullivan (1)	32	AFR (Note: Sunshine Tour flagship event)	
18 Jan	Abu Dhabi HSBC Golf Championship	UAE	US$2,700,000	(France) Gary Stal (1)	50		
24 Jan	Commercial Bank Qatar Masters	Qatar	US$2,500,000	(South Africa) Branden Grace (6)	42		
1 Feb	Omega Dubai Desert Classic	UAE	US$2,650,000	(Northern Ireland) Rory McIlroy (10)	50		
8 Feb	Maybank Malaysian Open	Malaysia	US$3,000,000	(India) Anirban Lahiri (1)	38	ASA	
15 Feb	True Thailand Classic	Thailand	US$2,000,000	(Australia) Andrew Dodt (2)	28	ASA	New tournament
22 Feb	Hero Indian Open	India	US$1,500,000	(India) Anirban Lahiri (2)	19	ASA	New to European Tour
1 Mar	Joburg Open	South Africa	€1,300,000	(England) Andy Sullivan (2)	19	AFR	
8 Mar	Africa Open	South Africa	R14,500,000	(South Africa) Trevor Fisher Jnr (1)	19	AFR	
8 Mar	WGC-Cadillac Championship	United States	US$9,250,000	(United States) Dustin Johnson (n/a)	76		World Golf Championship
15 Mar	Tshwane Open	South Africa	R18,500,000	(South Africa) George Coetzee (2)	19	AFR	
29 Mar	Trophée Hassan II	Morocco	€1,500,000	(Scotland) Richie Ramsay (3)	24		
12 Apr	Masters Tournament	United States	US$10,000,000	(United States) Jordan Spieth (n/a)	100		Major championship
19 Apr	Shenzhen International	China	US$2,500,000	(Thailand) Kiradech Aphibarnrat (2)	24		New tournament
26 Apr	Volvo China Open	China	CN¥20,000,000	(China) Wu Ashun (1)	26	ONE	
3 May	WGC-Cadillac Match Play	United States	US$9,250,000	(Northern Ireland) Rory McIlroy (11)	76		World Golf Championship
10 May	AfrAsia Bank Mauritius Open	Mauritius	€1,000,000	(South Africa) George Coetzee (3)	17	AFR, ASA	New tournament
17 May	Open de España	Spain	€1,500,000	(England) James Morrison (2)	26		
24 May	BMW PGA Championship	England	€5,000,000	(South Korea) An Byeong-hun (1)	64		Flagship event
31 May	Dubai Duty Free Irish Open	Northern Ireland	€2,500,000	(Denmark) Søren Kjeldsen (4)	48		
7 Jun	Nordea Masters	Sweden	€1,500,000	(Sweden) Alex Norén (4)	26		
14 Jun	Lyoness Open	Austria	€1,500,000	(England) Chris Wood (2)	24		
21 Jun	U.S. Open	United States	US$9,000,000	(United States) Jordan Spieth (n/a)	100		Major championship
28 Jun	BMW International Open	Germany	€2,000,000	(Spain) Pablo Larrazábal (4)	32		
5 Jul	Alstom Open de France	France	€3,000,000	(Austria) Bernd Wiesberger (3)	36		
12 Jul	Aberdeen Asset Management Scottish Open	Scotland	£3,250,000	(United States) Rickie Fowler (n/a)	50		
20 Jul	The Open Championship	Scotland	£6,300,000	(United States) Zach Johnson (n/a)	100		Major championship
26 Jul	Omega European Masters	Switzerland	€2,700,000	(England) Danny Willett (3)	32	ASA	
2 Aug	Saltire Energy Paul Lawrie Match Play	Scotland	€1,000,000	(Thailand) Kiradech Aphibarnrat (3)	24		New tournament Limited-field event
2 Aug (Note: Rescheduled due to persistent bad weather.); ~~22 Mar~~	Madeira Islands Open - Portugal - BPI	Portugal	€600,000	(Finland) Roope Kakko (1)	18	CHA	
9 Aug	WGC-Bridgestone Invitational	United States	US$9,250,000	(Republic of Ireland) Shane Lowry (3)	74		World Golf Championship
16 Aug	PGA Championship	United States	US$10,000,000	(Australia) Jason Day (n/a)	100		Major championship
23 Aug	Made in Denmark	Denmark	€1,500,000	(England) David Horsey (4)	24		
30 Aug	D+D Real Czech Masters	Czech Republic	€1,000,000	(Belgium) Thomas Pieters (1)	24		
6 Sep	M2M Russian Open	Russia	€1,000,000	(England) Lee Slattery (2)	24		
13 Sep	KLM Open	Netherlands	€1,800,000	(Belgium) Thomas Pieters (2)	24		
20 Sep	Open d'Italia	Italy	€1,500,000	(Sweden) Rikard Karlberg (1)	24		
27 Sep	Porsche European Open	Germany	€2,000,000	(Thailand) Thongchai Jaidee (7)	30		
4 Oct	Alfred Dunhill Links Championship	Scotland	US$5,000,000	(Denmark) Thorbjørn Olesen (3)	44		Pro-Am
11 Oct	British Masters	England	£3,000,000	(England) Matt Fitzpatrick (1)	36		
18 Oct	Portugal Masters	Portugal	€2,000,000	(England) Andy Sullivan (3)	24		
25 Oct	UBS Hong Kong Open	Hong Kong	US$2,000,000	(England) Justin Rose (8)	34	ASA	
1 Nov	Turkish Airlines Open	Turkey	US$7,000,000	(France) Victor Dubuisson (2)	44		Race to Dubai finals series
8 Nov	WGC-HSBC Champions	China	US$8,500,000	(Scotland) Russell Knox (1)	66		World Golf Championship; Race to Dubai finals series
15 Nov	BMW Masters	China	US$7,000,000	(Sweden) Kristoffer Broberg (1)	50		Race to Dubai finals series
22 Nov	DP World Tour Championship, Dubai	UAE	US$8,000,000	(Northern Ireland) Rory McIlroy (12)	52		Race to Dubai finals series

== Location of tournaments ==
Location of official tournaments of the 2015 European Tour in Europe.
Major Championship
Flagship event
Final Series event
Regular event
Location of official tournaments of the 2015 European Tour outside Europe.
Major Championship
World Golf Championship
Final Series event
Regular event

South Africa
United Arab Emirates

== Race to Dubai ==
The Race to Dubai was based on tournament results during the season, calculated using a points-based system.

Pos.	Player	Majors				WGCs				Flagship event and R2D finals series (Note: The WGC-HSBC Champions was also a Race to Dubai finals series event.)				Top 10s in other ET events								Tmts	Points and money (Note: In addition to tournament prize money, the top 15 point scorers received a share of a $5m bonus pool. Those inside the top 15 who participated in at least 3 of the 4 Final Series events received an additional shared of a $1,365,500 bonus pool.)		
Pos.	Player	Mas	USO	Opn	PGA	WGC Cad	WGC MP	WGC Inv	WGC Cha	BMW PGA	Tur	BMW Mas	DPW TC	1	2	3	4	5	6	7	8	Tmts	Total points	Bon. ($)	FS bonus ($)
1	(Northern Ireland) McIlroy	4th	T9	•	•	T9	1st	•	T11	CUT	T6	•	1st	2nd	1st							12	4,727,253	1,250,000	625,000
2	(England) Willett	T38	CUT	T6	T54	T12	3rd	T17	T3	T38	T11	T28	T4	1st	T4	T6	1st	T3				23	3,670,310	800,000	200,000
3	(South Africa) Grace	CUT	T4	T20	3rd	54th	T9	T17	T5	T11	•	T22	3rd	1st	1st							18	3,056,948	530,000	132,500
4	(England) Rose	T2	T27	T6	4th	55th	T17	T3	•	T38	•	T7	T22	1st								14	2,827,024	400,000	~~100,000~~ (Note: Having only played two Race to Dubai finals series events, Rose was not eligible for the additional finals series bonus.)
5	(Republic of Ireland) Lowry	CUT	T9	CUT	CUT	T17	T34	1st	T68	T6	8th	T56	T48	T2								18	2,729,144	350,000	87,500
6	(South Africa) Oosthuizen	T19	T2	T2	T30	6th	T5	T42	T44	•	•	T37	T38	T7	2nd							12	2,711,457	300,000	45,000
7	(South Korea) An	•	CUT	CUT	CUT	•	•	T57	T19	1st	4th	T3	T4	T5	T7	T8						26	2,417,356	250,000	37,500
8	(England) Sullivan	•	CUT	T30	CUT	•	T34	•	T64	17th	T60	T17	2nd	1st	T4	1st	T6	T6	1st			28	2,263,573	200,000	30,000
9	(Austria) Wiesberger	T22	CUT	T68	CUT	T31	T34	T25	T17	CUT	T50	T24	T17	T6	3rd	T4	2nd	T2	1st	T4		25	2,163,181	170,000	25,500
10	(Thailand) Jaidee	55th	CUT	T65	CUT	69th	T34	T57	T11	T2	T26	T3	T31	T7	T2	T10	1st					25	2,150,076	150,000	22,500
11	(France) Dubuisson	CUT	CUT	CUT	T18	T62	T52	T50	•	T63	1st	T17	T13	T4	T10							21	2,132,753	140,000	14,000
12	(England) Fitzpatrick	•	•	•	•	•	•	•	T7	•	T26	T13	T4	T5	T8	T3	2nd	3rd	T3	1st	T3	32	2,094,933	130,000	13,000
13	(Thailand) Aphibarnrat	•	•	CUT	T68	•	•	•	T30	T27	3rd	T31	T22	5th	T4	1st	T4	1st	T4	T5		25	2,055,618	120,000	12,000
14	(Sweden) Broberg	•	•	•	•	•	•	•	•	CUT	T50	1st	T17	T10	T6	T10	T2	T8				32	2,003,321	110,000	11,000
15	(Denmark) Kjeldsen	•	•	CUT	CUT	•	•	T12	T46	T18	T11	T9	T10	T9	1st	2nd	T2	T9	T9	T2		31	1,996,684	100,000	10,000

Win
Top 10
Made cut
Missed cut
• Did not play

== Awards ==
Award	Winner	Ref.
Golfer of the Year	(Northern Ireland) Rory McIlroy	
Players' Player of the Year	(Northern Ireland) Rory McIlroy	
Sir Henry Cotton Rookie of the Year	(South Korea) An Byeong-hun	
Graduate of the Year	(South Korea) An Byeong-hun	

== See also ==
- 2014 in golf
- 2015 in golf
- 2015 European Senior Tour
