= Li Haotong =

Chinese professional golfer (born 1995)

- Li in 2019

Personal information
- Nationality: China
- Born: 3 August 1995 (age 31) Miluo City, Hunan, China
- Height: 6 ft 0 in (1.83 m)
- Weight: 165 lb (75 kg; 11.8 st)

Career
- Sport: Golf
- Turned professional: 2011
- Current tours: PGA Tour; European Tour
- Former tours: Web.com Tour; PGA Tour China
- Professional wins: 8
- Highest ranking: 32 (28 January 2018)

Number of wins by tour
- European Tour: 4
- Other: 4

Best results in major championships
- Masters Tournament: T32: 2018
- PGA Championship: T17: 2020
- U.S. Open: T16: 2018
- The Open Championship: 3rd: 2017

Achievements and awards
- PGA Tour China Order of Merit winner: 2014

Li Haotong
- Chinese: 李昊桐
Transcriptions
Standard Mandarin
- Hanyu Pinyin: Lǐ Hàotóng
- IPA: [lì xâʊ.tʰʊ̌ŋ]

Li Haotong (Chinese: 李昊桐; pinyin: Lǐ Hàotóng; IPA: [lì xâʊ.tʰʊ̌ŋ]; born 3 August 1995) is a Chinese professional golfer who plays on the PGA Tour. He previously played on the European Tour, where he won four times.

== Career ==
Li turned professional in 2011 and played his early pro career on the OneAsia Tour and PGA Tour of Australasia. He also competed in a few European Tour events. Li qualified for the new PGA Tour China in 2014, where he won three times, led the tour's Order of Merit to earn full Web.com Tour status, and was the first Chinese member of the Web.com Tour. He finished 11th in his first Web.com Tour event, the Panama Claro Championship. He went on to maintain his 2016 Web.com Tour card by finishing 49th on the money list.

During the middle of his Web.com Tour season, Li traveled back to China and entered the inaugural Shenzhen International, an event added to the European Tour for 2015. Following a first-round 71 and a second-round 73, Li managed a third-round of seven-under-par 65, alongside two-time Masters champion Bubba Watson, who shot a 74. At that stage it was the joint lowest round of the tournament alongside Spain's Pablo Larrazábal. Speaking of the experience of playing alongside Watson, Li said, "He's pretty nice guy, so I very much enjoyed playing with him. I hit a lot of greens and made a lot of birdies. I was pretty lucky also." Watson praised the youngster, saying, "He's hitting the ball really well. He's making a lot of putts. The key around a golf course is a lot of putts and he made a lot of putts today." On day four of the tournament, Li shot a round of 67, but had to watch on TV to see if he would become the first Chinese player to win a European Tour event on home soil. Thailand's Kiradech Aphibarnrat, who had led for the majority of the tournament, managed to draw level at 12-under-par and force a playoff, which he won by one shot.

The next week, Li finished 6th at the Volvo China Open before returning to the Web.com Tour. At the conclusion of the Web.com Tour year, Li played five consecutive events in Asia, including the 2015 WGC-HSBC Champions in Shanghai. As one of six Chinese invites, he finished T7, the highest ever PGA Tour finish for a Chinese-born player.

On 1 May 2016, he captured his first European Tour victory by winning the Volvo China Open.

In 2017, Li mainly played on the European Tour, and also had some breakthrough at the majors. He qualified for the U.S. Open via the European sectional in England. He made the cut, but finished in solo-68th after consecutive rounds of 80's during the weekend. At the Open Championship, Li shot a final round of 63, and finished third-place alone. This result broke the records set by any Chinese players at the majors. Previously, Liang Wenchong shot 64 in the third round of the 2010 PGA Championship, where he finished eighth. Li's third-place finish at the Open Championship also qualified him for the 2018 Masters Tournament.

In January 2018, Li earned his second victory on the European Tour, at the Omega Dubai Desert Classic. In the process, he set a new tournament record. On 4 November 2018, Li lost a playoff to Justin Rose at the Turkish Airlines Open, a Rolex Series event.

In December 2019, Li played on the International team at the 2019 Presidents Cup at Royal Melbourne Golf Club in Australia. The U.S. team won 16–14. Li went 0–2–0 and including a loss in his Sunday singles match against Dustin Johnson.

At the 2020 PGA Championship, Li held the 36-hole lead by two strokes at 8 under par after opening rounds of 67-65. He shot 73-69 on the weekend and finished T17.

In June 2022, Li won the BMW International Open beating Thomas Pieters in a playoff. He holed a 50-foot birdie putt on the first extra hole. It was Li's first win in over four years.

At the 2025 Open Championship, Li was in contention throughout the week and stood second after the third round at 10-under-par, four strokes behind Scottie Scheffler. He was paired with Scheffler in the final group for the closing round at Royal Portrush, before finishing tied for fourth on 11-under-par. Scheffler won the championship at 17-under.

== Professional wins (8) ==
=== European Tour wins (4) ===
| No. | Date | Tournament | Winning score | Margin of victory | Runner-up |
|---|---|---|---|---|---|
| 1 | 1 May 2016 | Volvo China Open^{1} | −22 (69-67-66-64=266) | 3 strokes | (Chile) Felipe Aguilar |
| 2 | 28 Jan 2018 | Omega Dubai Desert Classic | −23 (66-66-64-69=265) | 1 stroke | (Northern Ireland) Rory McIlroy |
| 3 | 26 Jun 2022 | BMW International Open | −22 (62-67-67-70=266) | Playoff | (Belgium) Thomas Pieters |
| 4 | 9 Feb 2025 | Commercial Bank Qatar Masters | −16 (69-67-67-69=272) | 1 stroke | (Denmark) Rasmus Neergaard-Petersen |

^{1}Co-sanctioned by the OneAsia Tour

European Tour playoff record (1–2)

| No. | Year | Tournament | Opponent | Result |
|---|---|---|---|---|
| 1 | 2015 | Shenzhen International | (Thailand) Kiradech Aphibarnrat | Lost to birdie on first extra hole |
| 2 | 2018 | Turkish Airlines Open | (England) Justin Rose | Lost to par on first extra hole |
| 3 | 2022 | BMW International Open | (Belgium) Thomas Pieters | Won with birdie on first extra hole |

=== OneAsia Tour wins (2) ===
| No. | Date | Tournament | Winning score | Margin of victory | Runner-up |
|---|---|---|---|---|---|
| 1 | 12 Oct 2014 | Nanshan China Masters | −9 (68-65-72-70=275) | 4 strokes | (Australia) Jun Seok Lee |
| 2 | 1 May 2016 | Volvo China Open^{1} | −22 (69-67-66-64=266) | 3 strokes | (Chile) Felipe Aguilar |

^{1}Co-sanctioned by the European Tour

=== PGA Tour China wins (3) ===
| No. | Date | Tournament | Winning score | Margin of victory | Runner-up |
|---|---|---|---|---|---|
| 1 | 28 Sep 2014 | Jianye Tianzhu Henan Open | −13 (72-67-68-68=275) | 8 strokes | (Taiwan) Chan Shih-chang |
| 2 | 23 Nov 2014 | Hainan Open | −10 (71-68-69-70=278) | 6 strokes | (South Korea) Kim Do-hyun |
| 3 | 30 Nov 2014 | CTS Tycoon Championship | −11 (65-70-73-69=277) | 5 strokes | (Australia) Raymond Beaufils |

== Results in major championships ==
Results not in chronological order in 2020.

| Tournament | 2017 | 2018 |
|---|---|---|
| Masters Tournament | | T32 |
| U.S. Open | 68 | T16 |
| The Open Championship | 3 | T39 |
| PGA Championship | CUT | WD |

| Tournament | 2019 | 2020 | 2021 | 2022 | 2023 | 2024 | 2025 | 2026 |
|---|---|---|---|---|---|---|---|---|
| Masters Tournament | T43 | | | | | | | T38 |
| PGA Championship | T36 | T17 | | | | | | T35 |
| U.S. Open | T52 | | | | | | | |
| The Open Championship | CUT | NT | CUT | CUT | | | T4 | CUT |

Top 10
Did not play

CUT = missed the half-way cut
WD = withdrew
"T" = tied
NT = no tournament due to COVID-19 pandemic

=== Summary ===
| Tournament | Wins | 2nd | 3rd | Top-5 | Top-10 | Top-25 | Events | Cuts made |
|---|---|---|---|---|---|---|---|---|
| Masters Tournament | 0 | 0 | 0 | 0 | 0 | 0 | 3 | 3 |
| PGA Championship | 0 | 0 | 0 | 0 | 0 | 1 | 5 | 3 |
| U.S. Open | 0 | 0 | 0 | 0 | 0 | 1 | 3 | 3 |
| The Open Championship | 0 | 0 | 1 | 2 | 2 | 2 | 7 | 3 |
| Totals | 0 | 0 | 1 | 2 | 2 | 4 | 18 | 12 |

- Most consecutive cuts made – 3 (three times)
- Longest streak of top-10s – 1 (twice)

== Results in The Players Championship ==
| Tournament | 2018 | 2019 | 2020 | 2020 | 2022 | 2023 | 2024 | 2025 | 2026 |
|---|---|---|---|---|---|---|---|---|---|
| The Players Championship | CUT | CUT | | | | | | | CUT |

Did not play

CUT = missed the halfway cut

== Results in World Golf Championships ==
Results not in chronological order prior to 2015.

| Tournament | 2013 | 2014 | 2015 | 2016 | 2017 | 2018 | 2019 | 2020 |
|---|---|---|---|---|---|---|---|---|
| Championship | | | | | | 63 | T19 | |
| Match Play | | | | | | T59 | R16 | NT^{1} |
| Invitational | | | | | | T39 | T20 | T75 |
| Champions | T39 | T35 | T7 | T63 | T50 | T11 | T24 | NT^{1} |

^{1}Cancelled due to COVID-19 pandemic

Top 10
Did not play

QF, R16 = Round in which player lost in match play
NT = No tournament
"T" = tied

== Team appearances ==
Professional

- World Cup (representing China): 2016, 2018
- EurAsia Cup (representing Asia): 2018
- Presidents Cup (representing the International team): 2019

== See also ==
- 2025 Race to Dubai dual card winners
