= 2015 BMW PGA Championship =

Golf tournament

Tournament information
- Dates: 21–24 May 2015
- Location: Virginia Water, Surrey, England; 51.40°N 0.59°W
- Courses: Wentworth Club; West Course
- Tour: European Tour

Statistics
- Par: 72
- Length: 7,302 yards (6,677 m)
- Field: 150 players, 76 after cut
- Cut: 145 (+1)
- Prize fund: €5,000,000
- Winner's share: €833,330

Champion
- (South Korea) An Byeong-hun
- 267 (−21)

Location map
- Location in England Location in Surrey

The 2015 BMW PGA Championship was the 61st edition of the BMW PGA Championship, an annual golf tournament on the European Tour, held 21–24 May at the West Course of Wentworth Club in Virginia Water, Surrey, England, a suburb southwest of London.

An Byeong-hun won the tournament with a record-breaking 21-under-par total.

== Course layout ==
Wentworth Club, West Course
Tee	Rating/Slope	1	2	3	4	5	6	7	8	9	Out	10	11	12	13	14	15	16	17	18	In	Total
Yardage	n/a	473	154	465	552	203	418	396	391	449	3,501	184	416	531	470	179	489	383	610	539	3,801	7,302
Par		4	3	4	5	3	4	4	4	4	35	3	4	5	4	3	4	4	5	5	37	72

== Round summaries ==
=== First round ===
Thursday, 21 May 2015

Francesco Molinari took a two stroke lead after a bogey-free round of 65. Molinari finished joint second in the Open de España the previous week and finished in the top 10 in the BMW PGA Championship in 2012, 2013 and 2014.

Place	Player	Score	To par
1	(Italy) Francesco Molinari	65	−7
2	(Sweden) Robert Karlsson	67	−5
T3	(Spain) Jorge Campillo	68	−4
T3	(Spain) Miguel Ángel Jiménez	68	−4
T3	(Scotland) Marc Warren	68	−4
T3	(England) Chris Wood	68	−4
T3	(South Korea) Yang Yong-eun	68	−4
T8	(Denmark) Thomas Bjørn	69	−3
T8	(Belgium) Nicolas Colsaerts	69	−3
T8	(England) Tommy Fleetwood	69	−3
T8	(France) Jérôme Lando-Casanova	69	−3
T8	(Spain) Pablo Larrazábal	69	−3
T8	(Republic of Ireland) Peter Lawrie	69	−3

=== Second round ===
Friday, 22 May 2015

Place	Player	Score	To par
1	(Italy) Francesco Molinari	65-69=134	−10
2	(South Korea) An Byeong-hun	71-64=135	−9
T3	(Argentina) Emiliano Grillo	71-65=136	−8
T3	(Thailand) Thongchai Jaidee	70-66=136	−8
5	(England) James Morrison	71-66=137	−7
T6	(Spain) Miguel Ángel Jiménez	68-70=138	−6
T6	(Sweden) Robert Karlsson	67-61=138	−6
T8	(Spain) Ignacio Garrido	71-68=139	−5
T8	(Netherlands) Joost Luiten	72-67=139	−5
T8	(Sweden) Alex Norén	72-67=139	−5

=== Third round ===
Saturday, 23 May 2015

Place	Player	Score	To par
T1	(South Korea) An Byeong-hun	71-64-67=202	−14
T1	(Italy) Francesco Molinari	65-69-68=202	−14
3	(Thailand) Thongchai Jaidee	70-66-68=204	−12
4	(England) Tommy Fleetwood	69-71-65=205	−11
5	(Spain) Miguel Ángel Jiménez	68-70-68=206	−10
6	(Sweden) Alex Norén	72-67-68=207	−9
7	(Republic of Ireland) Shane Lowry	74-67-67=208	−8
8	(England) Chris Wood	68-73-68=209	−7
T9	(Chile) Felipe Aguilar	70-73-67=210	−6
T9	(Wales) Jamie Donaldson	70-73-67=210	−6
T9	(France) Grégory Havret	70-71-69=210	−6
T9	(Sweden) Robert Karlsson	67-71-72=210	−6
T9	(United States) David Lipsky	75-66-69=210	−6
T9	(France) Julien Quesne	72-70-68=210	−6
T9	(United States) Peter Uihlein	76-68-66=210	−6

=== Final round ===
Sunday, 24 May 2015

Place	Player	Score	To par	Prize money (€)
1	(South Korea) An Byeong-hun	71-64-67-65=267	−21	833,330
T2	(Thailand) Thongchai Jaidee	70-66-68-69=273	−15	434,275
T2	(Spain) Miguel Ángel Jiménez	68-70-68-67=273	−15	434,275
4	(England) Chris Wood	68-73-68-66=275	−13	250,000
5	(Italy) Francesco Molinari	65-69-68-74=276	−12	212,000
T6	(England) Tommy Fleetwood	69-71-65-72=277	−11	162,500
T6	(Republic of Ireland) Shane Lowry	74-67-67-69=277	−11	162,500
T8	(Sweden) Alex Norén	72-67-68-71=278	−10	118,500
T8	(France) Julien Quesne	72-70-68-68=278	−10	118,500
10	(Spain) Alejandro Cañizares	72-71-68-68=279	−9	100,000
