= 2018 EurAsia Cup =

- Dates: 12–14 January 2018
- Venue: Glenmarie Golf and Country Club
- Location: Shah Alam, Selangor, Malaysia
- Captains: Arjun Atwal (Asia); Thomas Bjørn (Europe)
Asia	10	14	Europe
- Europe wins the EurAsia Cup

The 2018 EurAsia Cup presented by DRB-HICOM was the third edition of the EurAsia Cup, a team golf event contested between teams representing Asia and Europe. It was held from 12 to 14 January at the Glenmarie Golf and Country Club in Shah Alam, Selangor, Malaysia. The team captains were Thomas Bjørn and Arjun Atwal.

The event had a $4,800,000 purse; $300,000 to each member of the winning team and $100,000 to each member of the losing team.

Europe won the match 14 to 10. Asia had held a narrow 6½ to 5½ lead at the start of the final day's singles session but Europe won 8 of the first 9 matches and retained the trophy.

== Teams ==
Asia
Player	Country	Age	Money list ranks				OWGR	Previous appearances	Matches	W–L–H	Winning percentage
Player	Country	Age	Asian	Japan	Euro	PGA Tour	OWGR	Previous appearances	Matches	W–L–H	Winning percentage
Arjun Atwal	India	44	Non-playing captain								
Gavin Green	Malaysia	24	1				179	0	Rookie		
Shiv Chawrasia	India	39	5		109		214	1	3	1–2–0	33.33
Phachara Khongwatmai	Thailand	18	3	87	123		159	0	Rookie		
Poom Saksansin	Thailand	24	8	64	188		172	0	Rookie		
Yuta Ikeda	Japan	32		4			36	0	Rookie		
Li Haotong	China	22			17		59	0	Rookie		
Kiradech Aphibarnrat	Thailand	28			11		49	2	6	2–3–1	41.67
Anirban Lahiri	India	30			133	51	68	2	6	3–3–0	50.00
Hideto Tanihara	Japan	39		55	27		69	1	3	0–2–1	16.67
Kang Sung-hoon	South Korea	30				59	81	0	Rookie		
An Byeong-hun	South Korea	26			93	102	100	1	3	1–2–0	33.33
Nicholas Fung	Malaysia	27	28		255		335	2	6	0–4–2	16.67

OWGR as of 7 January.
Yellow background indicates a captain's pick.

The Asian team was selected as follows: the leading four available Asian players from the 2017 Asian Tour Order of Merit as of 27 November, the leading four eligible and available Asian players from the Official World Golf Ranking as of 27 November, and four captain's picks. The leading four Asian players from the Asian Tour Order of Merit were Gavin Green (1), Shiv Chawrasia (4), Phachara Khongwatmai (5) and Poom Saksansin (6). The leading Asian players from the Official World Golf Ranking were Hideki Matsuyama (5), Yuta Ikeda (37), Kim Si-woo (40), Satoshi Kodaira (53), Li Haotong (57), Kiradech Aphibarnrat (59) and Anirban Lahiri (65). Matsuyama, Kim and Kodaira did not play. The captain's picks were Hideto Tanihara, Kang Sung-hoon, An Byeong-hun and Nicholas Fung.

Europe
Player	Country	Age	Euro rank	OWGR	Previous appearances	Matches	W–L–H	Winning percentage
Thomas Bjørn	Denmark	46	Non-playing captain					
Tommy Fleetwood	England	26	1	18	0	Rookie		
Tyrrell Hatton	England	26	5	17	0	Rookie		
Ross Fisher	England	37	6	31	1	3	2–0–1	83.33
Rafa Cabrera-Bello	Spain	33	7	20	0	Rookie		
Alex Norén	Sweden	35	8	19	0	Rookie		
Matt Fitzpatrick	England	23	12	29	1	3	2–1–0	66.67
Bernd Wiesberger	Austria	32	14	42	1	3	2–1–0	66.67
Henrik Stenson	Sweden	41	15	9	0	Rookie		
Paul Dunne	Ireland	25	16	75	0	Rookie		
Thomas Pieters	Belgium	25	20	38	0	Rookie		
Alexander Lévy	France	27	21	74	0	Rookie		
Paul Casey	England	40	n/a	14	0	Rookie		

OWGR as of 7 January.
Yellow background indicates a captain's pick.

The European team was selected as follows: the leading 10 available European players from the final 2017 European Tour Race to Dubai rankings plus two captain's picks. The qualifiers from the Race to Dubai were Fleetwood (1), Hatton (5), Fisher (6), Cabrera-Bello (7), Norén (8), Fitzpatrick (12), Wiesberger (14), Stenson (15), Dunne (16), and Pieters (20); Justin Rose (2), Jon Rahm (3), Sergio García (4), Francesco Molinari (9) and Rory McIlroy (13) chose not to participate. Lévy and Casey were chosen as captain picks.

== Schedule ==
- 12 January (Friday) Four-ball x 6
- 13 January (Saturday) Foursomes x 6
- 14 January (Sunday) Singles x 12

== Friday's matches (four-ball) ==
Asia	Results	Europe
An/Aphibarnrat	4 & 3	Fleetwood/Casey
Ikeda/Green	2 & 1	Pieters/Fitzpatrick
Tanihara/Khongwatmai	2 up	Norén/Dunne
Kang/Saksansin	5 & 4	Stenson/Lévy
Fung/Li	halved	Wiesberger/Cabrera-Bello
Lahiri/Chawrasia	5 & 4	Fisher/Hatton
3½	Session	2½
3½	Overall	2½

== Saturday's matches (foursomes) ==
Asia	Results	Europe
Chawrasia/Lahiri	3 & 2	Fleetwood/Stenson
Aphibarnrat/An	2 & 1	Casey/Hatton
Green/Ikeda	1 up	Cabrera-Bello/Lévy
Saksansin/Kang	3 & 2	Fitzpatrick/Pieters
Khongwatmai/Tanihara	2 & 1	Dunne/Norén
Li/Fung	3 & 1	Fisher/Wiesberger
3	Session	3
6½	Overall	5½

== Sunday's matches (singles) ==
Asia	Results	Europe
Fung	4 & 2	Norén
Saksansin	1 up	Casey
Chawrasia	2 & 1	Fleetwood
Tanihara	2 & 1	Stenson
Green	4 & 3	Cabrera-Bello
Khongwatmai	2 & 1	Wiesberger
Aphibarnrat	3 & 1	Lévy
An	1 up	Pieters
Lahiri	2 & 1	Hatton
Kang	halved	Fitzpatrick
Ikeda	1 up	Fisher
Li	3 & 1	Dunne
3½	Session	8½
10	Overall	14
