= 2016 World Cup of Golf =

Coordinates: 37.959°S 145.088°E

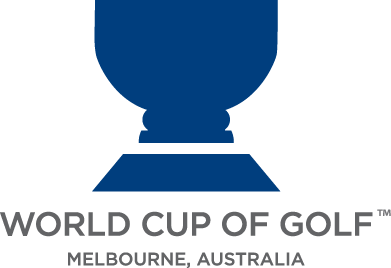

Tournament information
- Dates: 24–27 November
- Location: Melbourne, Australia
- Course: Kingston Heath Golf Club
- Format: 72 holes stroke play alternate shot & four-ball

Statistics
- Par: 72
- Field: 28 two-man teams
- Prize fund: $8.0 million
- Winner's share: $2.56 million

Champion
- Denmark; Søren Kjeldsen & Thorbjørn Olesen
- 268 (−20)

The 2016 World Cup of Golf (known as the 2016 ISPS Handa World Cup of Golf for sponsorship reasons) was a golf tournament played from 24–27 November at Kingston Heath Golf Club in Melbourne, Australia. It was the 58th World Cup. Twenty-eight countries competed as two-player teams. The format was 72-hole stroke play; the first and third days were alternate shot, and the second and fourth days were four-ball play.

The tournament was won by Denmark by four shots.

== Qualification ==
Jason Day, the individual champion of the 2013 World Cup of Golf, qualified automatically, representing Australia, and was allowed to select his partner as defined below. One player each from 27 other countries qualified based on their position in the Official World Golf Ranking on 1 August. The deadline for these players to commit was 11 August.

The 28 exempt players selected a partner from the same country, if such a player was ranked in the top 500 of the OWGR. If less than five other players from that country were ranked in the top 500, a player could choose a partner from outside the top 500. The deadline for teams to be finalized is 26 August.

== Teams ==
The table below lists the teams in order of qualification (i.e. ranking of seeded player on 1 August 2016), together with their World Ranking at the time of the tournament.

Country	Seeded player	Unseeded player
United States	Rickie Fowler (12)	Jimmy Walker (20)
Australia	Adam Scott (7)	Marc Leishman (54)
Japan	Hideki Matsuyama (6)	Ryo Ishikawa (100)
England	Chris Wood (38)	Andy Sullivan (46)
Scotland	Russell Knox (19)	Duncan Stewart (324)
Spain	Rafa Cabrera-Bello (32)	Jon Rahm (131)
Ireland	Shane Lowry (43)	Graeme McDowell (83)
South Korea	An Byeong-hun (42)	Kim Kyung-tae (56)
Thailand	Thongchai Jaidee (52)	Kiradech Aphibarnrat (81)
Denmark	Søren Kjeldsen (45)	Thorbjørn Olesen (67)
New Zealand	Danny Lee (64)	Ryan Fox (135)
Sweden	Alex Norén (9)	David Lingmerth (66)
Italy	Francesco Molinari (33)	Matteo Manassero (340)
Austria	Bernd Wiesberger (40)	Martin Wiegele (1319)
Belgium	Thomas Pieters (50)	Nicolas Colsaerts (106)
Netherlands	Joost Luiten (59)	Darius van Driel (385)
South Africa	Jaco van Zyl (94)	George Coetzee (141)
Venezuela	Jhonattan Vegas (74)	Julio Vegas (1871)
France	Victor Dubuisson (79)	Romain Langasque (192)
Wales	Bradley Dredge (91)	Stuart Manley (881)
Germany	Alex Čejka (150)	Stephan Jäger (472)
Portugal	Ricardo Gouveia (125)	José-Filipe Lima (287)
Canada	David Hearn (149)	Adam Hadwin (187)
China	Wu Ashun (171)	Li Haotong (130)
Philippines	Miguel Tabuena (154)	Angelo Que (416)
Chinese Taipei	Pan Cheng-tsung (195)	Chan Shih-chang (188)
India	Shiv Chawrasia (226)	S. Chikkarangappa (326)
Malaysia	Danny Chia (296)	Nicholas Fung (329)

The following players were eligible to be a seeded player but did not commit. The order is based on the World Rankings on 1 August 2016. Three countries with an eligible player did not compete: Argentina, Fiji and Paraguay. They were replaced by Chinese Taipei, India and Malaysia.

- (Australia) Jason Day
- (United States) Dustin Johnson
- (United States) Jordan Spieth
- (Republic of Ireland) Rory McIlroy
- (Sweden) Henrik Stenson
- (United States) Bubba Watson
- (England) Danny Willett
- (South Africa) Branden Grace
- (Spain) Sergio García
- (England) Justin Rose
- (South Africa) Louis Oosthuizen
- (South Africa) Charl Schwartzel
- (Argentina) Emiliano Grillo
- (Germany) Martin Kaymer
- (India) Anirban Lahiri
- (Argentina) Fabián Gómez
- (Wales) Jamie Donaldson
- (Fiji) Vijay Singh
- (Paraguay) Fabrizio Zanotti

== Final leaderboard ==
Place	Country	Score	To par	Money (US$)
1	Denmark	72-60-70-66=268	−20	2,560,000
T2	China	70-65-72-65=272	−16	880,333
T2	France	70-67-72-63=272	−16	880,333
T2	United States	70-67-69-66=272	−16	880,333
5	Sweden	72-66-73-62=273	−15	380,000
T6	Italy	71-66-73-64=274	−14	297,500
T6	Japan	73-65-71-65=274	−14	297,500
8	Spain	69-67-73-66=275	−13	215,000
T9	Australia	74-68-70-65=277	−11	142,500
T9	Ireland	72-69-70-66=277	−11	142,500
T11	Canada	75-68-69-66=278	−10	105,000
T11	New Zealand	75-64-72-67=278	−10	105,000
T13	Belgium	73-69-70-67=279	−9	83,500
T13	England	71-66-77-65=279	−9	83,500
T13	Germany	74-71-70-64=279	−9	83,500
T13	South Africa	76-66-71-66=279	−9	83,500
T17	Austria	73-68-71-68=280	−8	75,000
T17	Netherlands	75-64-75-66=280	−8	75,000
T19	Scotland	78-65-72-67=282	−6	70,000
T19	Chinese Taipei	74-65-74-69=282	−6	70,000
T19	Thailand	73-66-77-66=282	−6	70,000
T22	India	74-66-75-68=283	−5	63,000
T22	Malaysia	77-68-72-66=283	−5	63,000
T22	South Korea	74-69-76-64=283	−5	63,000
T22	Wales	74-66-80-63=283	−5	63,000
26	Portugal	74-68-72-70=284	−4	58,000
27	Venezuela	74-68-76-67=285	−3	56,000
28	Philippines	77-67-77-70=291	+3	54,000
