= Thomas Pieters =

Belgian professional golfer (born 1992)

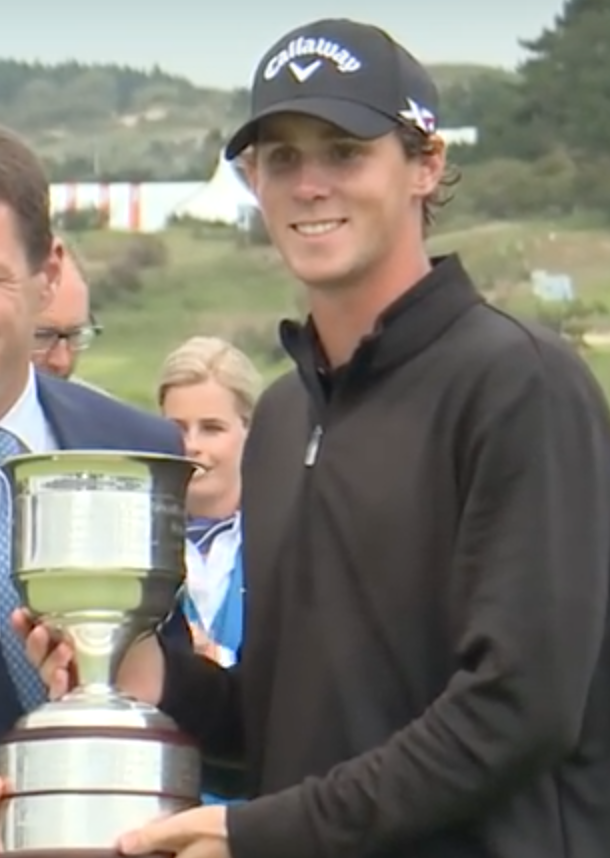
- Pieters after winning the 2015 KLM Open

Personal information
- Full name: Thomas Pieters
- Nationality: Belgium
- Born: 27 January 1992 (age 34) Geel, Belgium
- Height: 1.96 m (6 ft 5 in)
- Weight: 85 kg (187 lb; 13.4 st)

Career
- Sport: Golf
- College: University of Illinois
- Turned professional: 2013
- Current tour: LIV Golf
- Former tours: PGA Tour; European Tour
- Professional wins: 7
- Highest ranking: 23 (6 August 2017) (as of 25 October 2026)

Number of wins by tour
- European Tour: 6
- Other: 1

Best results in major championships
- Masters Tournament: T4: 2017
- PGA Championship: T6: 2018
- U.S. Open: T23: 2020
- The Open Championship: T28: 2018, 2022

Thomas Pieters (born 27 January 1992) is a Belgian professional golfer who currently plays on the European Tour and LIV Golf. After a successful amateur career that included winning the individual 2012 NCAA Division I Championship, he turned professional in 2013. Pieters has won multiple titles on the European Tour, including his first Rolex Series victory at the 2022 Abu Dhabi HSBC Championship. He also represented Europe at the 2016 Ryder Cup and competed for Belgium at the 2016 Summer Olympics, finishing in fourth place.

== Early life ==
Pieters was born in Geel, Belgium, in 1992. He started playing golf at the age of five, learning the game at the Witbos Golf Club in Noorderwijk, Belgium.

== Amateur career ==
In 2010, he attended the University of Illinois for which he won the individual 2011 Jack Nicklaus Invitational and the individual 2012 NCAA Division I Championship in his second year; the next year, he finished second with his team at the 2013 NCAA Division I Championship and won the individual 2013 Big Ten Conference Championship.

== Professional career ==
In summer 2013, Pieters decided to forgo his senior year at the University of Illinois and turn professional. He made his debut on the European Tour in July at the Alstom Open de France, where he finished 29th; at the end of the year, he battled through all three stages of the European Tour Qualifying School taking the 20th card at the Final Stage, and qualified to play on the European Tour.

His best result in his first year was as runner-up in the 2014 Open de España, leading after the second and third rounds, finishing 6th at the Russian Open Golf Championship and 8th at the 2014 Malaysian Open and at the 2014 Alfred Dunhill Championship. He finished the year ranked No.243 in the Official World Golf Ranking (OWGR), having ended the previous year at No.1122.

In 2015, he started with a 4th-place finish at the Abu Dhabi HSBC Golf Championship which took him to No.156 on the OWGR. In August and September, he won the D+D Real Czech Masters and the KLM Open in consecutive tournaments played and moved into the top 100 in the OWGR. The two wins and five top-10 placements of the season gave him a final 29th place in the Race to Dubai.

Pieters started 2016 at the Abu Dhabi HSBC Golf Championship, where he finished 2nd. In August, he represented Belgium at the 2016 Summer Olympics, finishing in 4th place. In the same month, he obtained a second place at the 2016 D+D Real Czech Masters and won the 2016 Made in Denmark. He was chosen by Darren Clarke as a captain's pick for the 2016 Ryder Cup.

Pieters opened the 2017 season with a tie for 2nd at the Genesis Open in February and followed that up with a top-5 finish at the WGC-Mexico Championship. Those finishes moved Pieters to 29th in the Official World Golf Ranking and qualified him for his first Masters Tournament where he finished 4th. He capped a successful summer with his second top-5 finish at a WGC event when he finished 4th at the WGC-Bridgestone Invitational. That finish moved him into the top-25 of the OWGR. In September 2017, the European Tour announced that it would be returning to Belgium for the first time in 18 years with Pieters hosting the Belgian Knockout – a unique strokeplay and matchplay format – in May 2018.

In November 2018, Pieters won the 2018 World Cup of Golf with partner Thomas Detry, representing Belgium, at Metropolitan Golf Club in Melbourne, Australia.

In August 2019, Pieters shot a 3-under 69 to become the first golfer to win the D+D Real Czech Masters for the second time, beating Adri Arnaus by one stroke.

Pieters claimed his fifth European Tour victory in November 2021 at the Portugal Masters. Two months later, Pieters won the Abu Dhabi HSBC Championship for his sixth European Tour win and first Rolex Series victory.

In February 2023, it was confirmed that Pieters had joined LIV Golf as a member of Bubba Watson's Range Goats team. In December 2024, it was announced that he was joining Dustin Johnson's 4Aces team for the 2025 season.

== Amateur wins ==
- 2009 International of Belgium Junior Championship
- 2011 Jack Nicklaus Invitational, Belgian Stroke Play Championship
- 2012 NCAA Division I Championship, Monroe Invitational
- 2013 Big Ten Championship

== Professional wins (7) ==
=== European Tour wins (6) ===
Legend
Rolex Series (1)
Other European Tour (5)

No.	Date	Tournament	Winning score	Margin of victory	Runner(s)-up
1	30 Aug 2015	D+D Real Czech Masters	−20 (66-68-65-69=268)	3 strokes	(Sweden) Pelle Edberg
2	13 Sep 2015	KLM Open	−19 (68-66-62-65=261)	1 stroke	(Spain) Eduardo de la Riva, (England) Lee Slattery
3	28 Aug 2016	Made in Denmark	−17 (62-71-69-65=267)	1 stroke	(Wales) Bradley Dredge
4	18 Aug 2019	D+D Real Czech Masters (2)	−19 (67-67-66-69=269)	1 stroke	(Spain) Adri Arnaus
5	7 Nov 2021	Portugal Masters	−19 (68-64-65-68=265)	2 strokes	(Denmark) Lucas Bjerregaard, (Denmark) Nicolai Højgaard, (France) Matthieu Pavon
6	23 Jan 2022	Abu Dhabi HSBC Championship	−10 (65-74-67-72=278)	1 stroke	(Spain) Rafa Cabrera-Bello, (India) Shubhankar Sharma

European Tour playoff record (0–2)

No.	Year	Tournament	Opponent(s)	Result
1	2014	Open de España	(Australia) Richard Green, (Spain) Miguel Ángel Jiménez	Jiménez won with par on first extra hole
2	2022	BMW International Open	(China) Li Haotong	Lost to birdie on first extra hole

=== Other wins (1) ===
No.	Date	Tournament	Winning score	Margin of victory	Runners-up
1	25 Nov 2018	ISPS Handa Melbourne World Cup of Golf (with (Belgium) Thomas Detry)	−23 (63-71-63-68=265)	3 strokes	Australia − Marc Leishman and Cameron Smith, Mexico − Abraham Ancer and Roberto Díaz

== Results in major championships ==
Results not in chronological order in 2020.

Tournament	2016	2017	2018
Masters Tournament		T4	CUT
U.S. Open		CUT	
The Open Championship	T30	T44	T28
PGA Championship	86	CUT	T6

Tournament	2019	2020	2021	2022	2023
Masters Tournament				CUT	T48
PGA Championship	T23		CUT	T71	T40
U.S. Open	CUT	T23		T27	CUT
The Open Championship	T67	NT		T28	T71

Top 10
Did not play

CUT = missed the half-way cut
"T" indicates a tie for a place
NT = No tournament due to COVID-19 pandemic

=== Summary ===
Tournament	Wins	2nd	3rd	Top-5	Top-10	Top-25	Events	Cuts made
Masters Tournament	0	0	0	1	1	1	4	2
PGA Championship	0	0	0	0	1	2	7	5
U.S. Open	0	0	0	0	0	1	5	2
The Open Championship	0	0	0	0	0	0	6	6
Totals	0	0	0	1	2	4	22	15

- Most consecutive cuts made – 5 (2022 PGA – 2023 PGA)
- Longest streak of top-10s – 1 (twice)

== Results in The Players Championship ==
Tournament	2022
The Players Championship	CUT

CUT = missed the halfway cut

== Results in World Golf Championships ==
Tournament	2015	2016	2017	2018	2019	2020	2021	2022
Championship			T5	T37				
Match Play		T28	T30	T52		NT^{1}		T26
Invitational			4					
Champions	T23	T14	T71	T18		NT^{1}	NT^{1}	NT^{1}

^{1}Cancelled due to COVID-19 pandemic

Top 10
Did not play

QF, R16, R32, R64 = Round in which player lost in match play
"T" = tied
NT = No tournament
Note that the Championship and Invitational were discontinued from 2022.

== Team appearances ==
Amateur

- European Boys' Team Championship (representing Belgium): 2009, 2010 (winners)
- Jacques Léglise Trophy (representing Continental Europe): 2010 (winners)
- Eisenhower Trophy (representing Belgium): 2010, 2012
- European Amateur Team Championship (representing Belgium): 2011
- Palmer Cup (representing Europe): 2012 (winners)

Professional

- Ryder Cup (representing Europe): 2016
- World Cup (representing Belgium): 2016, 2018 (winners)
- EurAsia Cup (representing Europe): 2018 (winners)
- Hero Cup (representing Continental Europe): 2023 (winners)

== See also ==
- 2013 European Tour Qualifying School graduates
