= Søren Kjeldsen =

Danish golfer (born 1975)

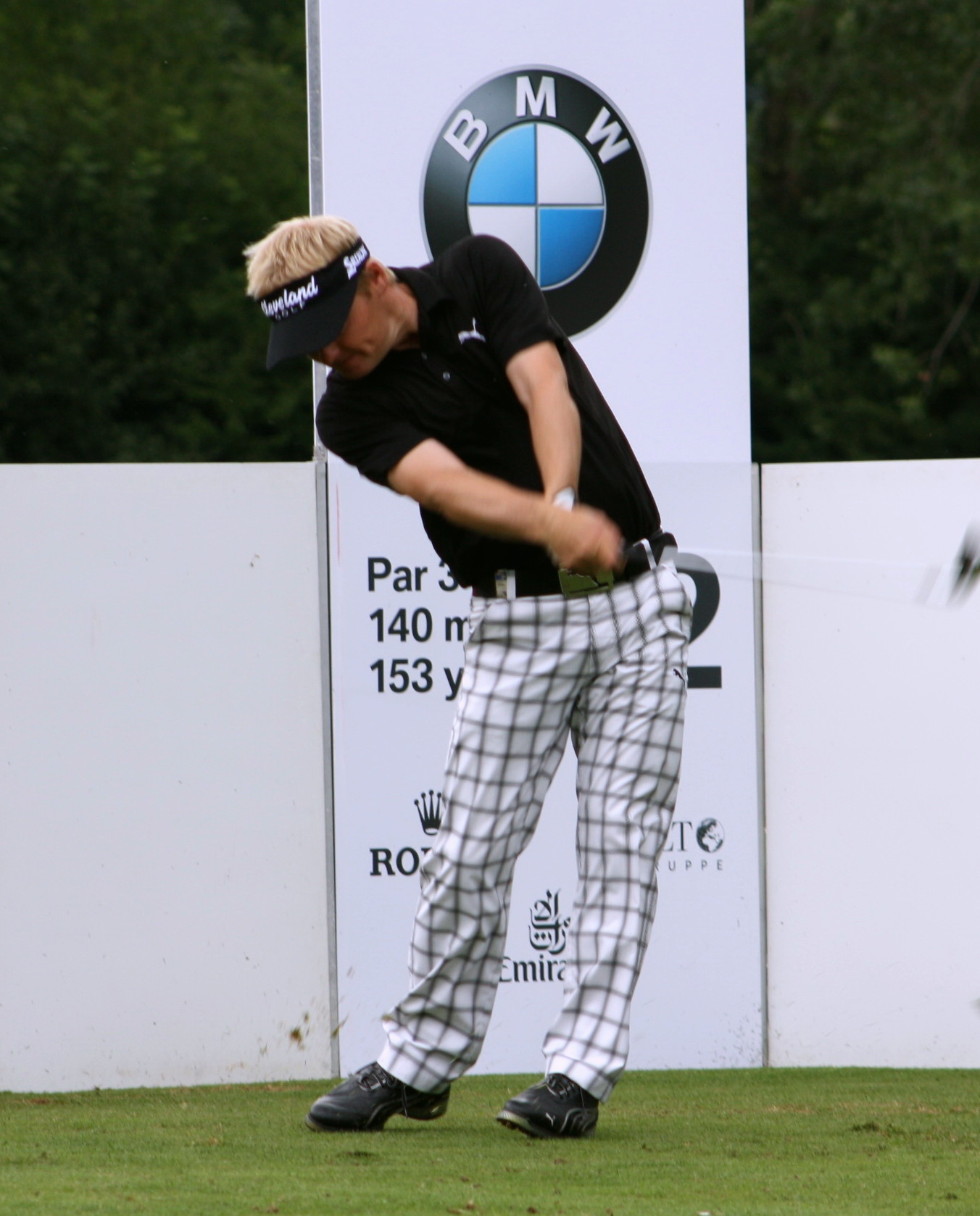
- Kjeldsen at the 2011 BMW International Open

Personal information
- Full name: Søren Panum Kjeldsen
- Nationality: Denmark
- Born: 17 May 1975 (age 51) Aalborg, Denmark
- Height: 1.70 m (5 ft 7 in)
- Weight: 65 kg (143 lb; 10.2 st)

Career
- Sport: Golf
- Turned professional: 1995
- Current tour: PGA Tour Champions
- Former tours: PGA Tour; European Tour; Challenge Tour
- Professional wins: 7
- Highest ranking: 31 (12 July 2009)

Number of wins by tour
- European Tour: 4
- Challenge Tour: 1
- Other: 2

Best results in major championships
- Masters Tournament: T7: 2016
- PGA Championship: T6: 2009
- U.S. Open: T33: 2010
- The Open Championship: T9: 2016

Søren Panum Kjeldsen ([ˈsœːɐ̯n̩ ˈkʰelˀsn̩]; born 17 May 1975) is a Danish golfer who currently plays on PGA Tour Champions.

== Professional career ==
Kjeldsen turned professional in 1995. Kjeldsen's success on the second tier Challenge Tour in 1997, which included his first victory as a professional in the Volvo Finnish Open, earned him membership on the main European Tour for 1998. He won his first European Tour title at the 2003 Diageo Championship at Gleneagles.

His second European Tour win came at the 2008 Volvo Masters at Valderrama Golf Club in Andalucía, Spain, where he won by two shots over Martin Kaymer and Anthony Wall. He finished the season 10th on the Order of Merit.

Kjeldsen won his third European Tour event, and second consecutive event on Spanish soil with a three shot victory over David Drysdale at the 2009 Open de Andalucía in Spain. Also in 2009, he finished third at the BMW PGA Championship, fourth at the Scottish Open, sixth at the PGA Championship and seventh at the WGC-CA Championship.

He finished second at the 2010 Andalucía Masters and the 2011 Volvo China Open. In 2012 he finished second at the Open de España and fifth at the Scottish Open.

In May 2015, Kjeldsen ended a six-year drought and won his fourth European Tour title at the Dubai Duty Free Irish Open. On a very windy final day, Kjeldsen held a two stroke lead but shot a 76 five over par round to fall into a three-man playoff with Eddie Pepperell and Bernd Wiesberger. On the first extra hole, Kjeldsen found the par five 18th green in two and after Pepperell and Wiesberger could not get up and down for their birdies, he two putted from 30 feet for the victory. Kjeldsen maintained his 100% record of winning when holding the 54 hole lead, which now stands at 4-for-4. The next week he finished second at the Nordea Masters. Later he finished second at the Made in Denmark and British Masters tournaments.

Kjeldsen represented Denmark in the Eisenhower Trophy in 1994 and at the World Cup in 1998, 1999, 2003, 2004, 2009, and 2016, winning the 2016 event alongside Thorbjørn Olesen.

He has featured in the top 50 of the Official World Golf Ranking.

In December 2024, Kjeldsen won the PGA Tour Champions Qualifying Tournament, earning a tour card once he turns 50 in May 2025. In early 2025, he played on the Nordic Golf League as a warm up for the upcoming PGA Tour Champions season. He went on to claim victory in the Infinitum Spring Series Final.

== Professional wins (7) ==
=== European Tour wins (4) ===
Legend
Tour Championships (1)
Other European Tour (3)

No.	Date	Tournament	Winning score	Margin of victory	Runner(s)-up
1	22 Jun 2003	Diageo Championship at Gleneagles	−9 (72-68-67-72=279)	2 strokes	(Scotland) Alastair Forsyth
2	2 Nov 2008	Volvo Masters	−8 (65-71-69-71=276)	2 strokes	(Germany) Martin Kaymer, (England) Anthony Wall
3	29 Mar 2009	Open de Andalucía	−14 (68-72-62-72=274)	3 strokes	(Scotland) David Drysdale
4	31 May 2015	Dubai Duty Free Irish Open	−2 (69-70-67-76=282)	Playoff	(England) Eddie Pepperell, (Austria) Bernd Wiesberger

European Tour playoff record (1–1)

No.	Year	Tournament	Opponents	Result
1	2007	Volvo Masters	(England) Simon Dyson, (England) Justin Rose	Rose won with birdie on second extra hole
2	2015	Dubai Duty Free Irish Open	(England) Eddie Pepperell, (Austria) Bernd Wiesberger	Won with birdie on first extra hole

=== Challenge Tour wins (1) ===
No.	Date	Tournament	Winning score	Margin of victory	Runners-up
1	13 Jul 1997	Volvo Finnish Open	−12 (70-67-72-67=276)	3 strokes	(Norway) Thomas Nielsen, (Sweden) Leif Westerberg

=== Nordic Golf League wins (1) ===
No.	Date	Tournament	Winning score	Margin of victory	Runner-up
1	5 Mar 2025	Infinitum Spring Series Final	−10 (67-65-69=201)	Playoff	(Spain) Pep Anglès

=== Other wins (1) ===
No.	Date	Tournament	Winning score	Margin of victory	Runners-up
1	27 Nov 2016	ISPS Handa World Cup of Golf (with (Denmark) Thorbjørn Olesen)	−20 (72-60-70-66=268)	4 strokes	China − Li Haotong and Wu Ashun, France − Victor Dubuisson and Romain Langasque, United States − Rickie Fowler and Jimmy Walker

== Playoff record ==
PGA Tour Champions playoff record (0–1)

No.	Year	Tournament	Opponents	Result
1	2025	Principal Charity Classic	(Spain) Miguel Ángel Jiménez, (Australia) Cameron Percy	Jiménez won with birdie on first extra hole

== Results in major championships ==
Tournament	2001	2002	2003	2004	2005	2006	2007	2008	2009
Masters Tournament									CUT
U.S. Open					T52		CUT		
The Open Championship	CUT		CUT			T41		CUT	T27
PGA Championship								CUT	T6

Tournament	2010	2011	2012	2013	2014	2015	2016	2017
Masters Tournament	T30						T7	T36
U.S. Open	T33		CUT				CUT	
The Open Championship	T37					CUT	T9	T37
PGA Championship	CUT					CUT	T33	CUT

Top 10
Did not play

CUT = missed the half-way cut
"T" indicates a tie for a place

=== Summary ===
Tournament	Wins	2nd	3rd	Top-5	Top-10	Top-25	Events	Cuts made
Masters Tournament	0	0	0	0	1	1	4	3
U.S. Open	0	0	0	0	0	0	5	2
The Open Championship	0	0	0	0	1	1	9	5
PGA Championship	0	0	0	0	1	1	6	2
Totals	0	0	0	0	3	3	24	12

- Most consecutive cuts made – 5 (2009 Open – 2010 Open)
- Longest streak of top-10s – 1 (three times)

== Results in The Players Championship ==
Tournament	2009	2010	2011	2012	2013	2014	2015	2016
The Players Championship	CUT							T43

Did not play

CUT = missed the halfway cut
"T" indicates a tie for a place

== Results in World Golf Championships ==
Results not in chronological order prior to 2015.

Tournament	2003	2004	2005	2006	2007	2008	2009	2010	2011	2012	2013	2014	2015	2016	2017
Championship	T59					11	T7	60						T28	T32
Match Play							R64	R64						T51	QF
Invitational							T68						T12	T42	
Champions							T10						T46	T40	

Top 10
Did not play

QF, R16, R32, R64 = Round in which player lost in match play
"T" = tied
Note that the HSBC Champions did not become a WGC event until 2009.

== Team appearances ==
Amateur

- European Boys' Team Championship (representing Denmark): 1991
- Jacques Léglise Trophy (representing the Continent of Europe): 1993
- European Amateur Team Championship (representing Denmark): 1993
- European Youths' Team Championship (representing Denmark): 1994
- Eisenhower Trophy (representing Denmark): 1994

Professional

- World Cup (representing Denmark): 1998, 1999, 2003, 2004, 2009, 2016 (winners), 2018
- Seve Trophy (representing Continental Europe): 2009
- EurAsia Cup (representing Europe): 2016 (winners)
