= An Byeong-hun =

South Korean professional golfer (born 1991)

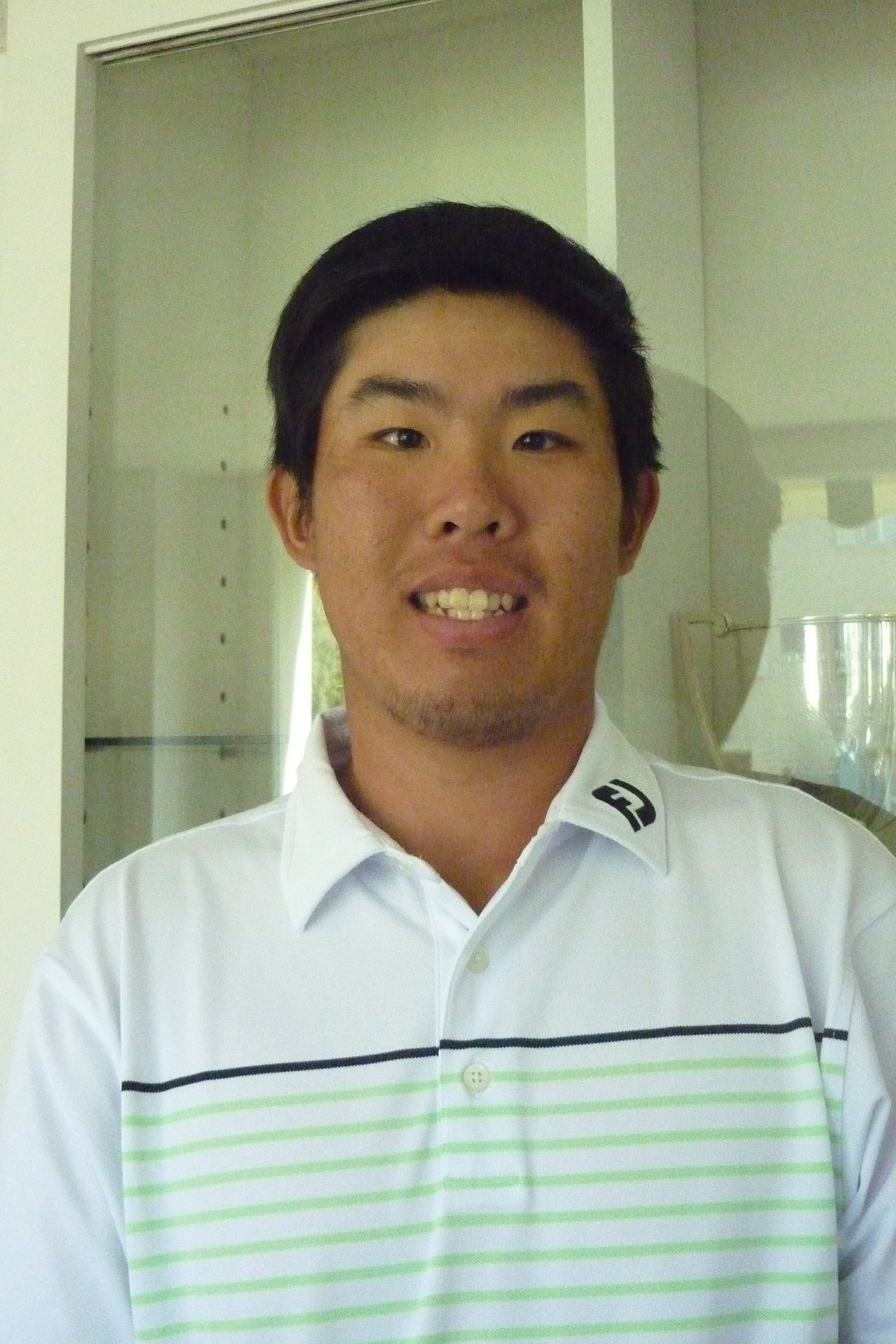

Personal information
- Full name: An Byeong-hun
- Nickname: Ben
- Nationality: South Korea
- Born: 17 September 1991 (age 35) Seoul, South Korea
- Height: 1.87 m (6 ft 2 in)
- Weight: 95 kg (209 lb)

Career
- Sport: Golf
- College: University of California, Berkeley
- Turned professional: 2011
- Current tour: European Tour
- Former tours: PGA Tour; LIV Golf; Korn Ferry Tour; Challenge Tour
- Professional wins: 5
- Highest ranking: 22 (24 November 2024) (as of 8 November 2026)

Number of wins by tour
- European Tour: 2
- Korn Ferry Tour: 1
- Challenge Tour: 1
- Other: 1

Best results in major championships
- Masters Tournament: T16: 2024
- PGA Championship: T22: 2020
- U.S. Open: T16: 2019
- The Open Championship: T13: 2024

Achievements and awards
- Sir Henry Cotton Rookie of the Year: 2015
- European Tour Graduate of the Year: 2015

An Byeong-hun (Korean: 안병훈; born 17 September 1991), also known as Byeong-Hun An or Ben An, is a South Korean professional golfer. In August 2009, he became the youngest-ever winner of the U.S. Amateur.

== Early life ==
Born in Seoul, South Korea, An is the son of South Korean Ahn Jae-Hyung and Chinese Jiao Zhimin, both of whom were medalists in table tennis at the 1988 Summer Olympics in Seoul.

An moved to the United States in December 2005 to attend the David Leadbetter Golf Academy in Bradenton, Florida, where he was also known as Ben An.

== Amateur career ==
In August 2009, at age 17, An became the youngest-ever winner of the U.S. Amateur when he defeated Ben Martin 7 & 5 in the 36-hole final at Southern Hills Country Club in Tulsa, Oklahoma. He made his PGA Tour debut in March 2010 at the Arnold Palmer Invitational, two weeks before playing in The Masters. An made the cut at the 2010 Verizon Heritage and was one shot off the lead during the second round before finishing the tournament T-59.

At the 2010 U.S. Amateur, An became the first defending champion to advance to the semifinals since Tiger Woods in 1996. After An took a 3-up lead after nine holes in his semifinal match, his opponent David Chung rallied to defeat An 1-up.

== Professional career ==
An turned professional in 2011 and earned a spot on the Challenge Tour via three stages of qualifying school.

In June 2013, An had his best finish to date on the Challenge Tour, tied for second place at the Scottish Hydro Challenge. In August 2014, he won his first Challenge Tour event at the Rolex Trophy, making An the first Korean to win on the Challenge Tour. He finished 2014 in third place in the Challenge Tour Rankings, and moved up to the European Tour.

In May 2015, he won the BMW PGA Championship at Wentworth. He was only the second player to win both the U.S. Amateur and the British PGA Championship, after Arnold Palmer.

In 2016, An played the Zurich Classic of New Orleans on an exemption, and lost a playoff at the first hole. In 2016, he earned enough money as a non-member to gain a PGA Tour card for 2016–17.

In December 2019, An played on the International team at the 2019 Presidents Cup at Royal Melbourne Golf Club in Australia. The U.S. team won 16–14. An went 1–2–2 and lost his Sunday singles match against Webb Simpson.

An has been suspended from the PGA Tour for three months in 2023 (August 31 – December 1) for violating the tour's anti-doping policy. He tested positive for a substance banned by the World Anti-Doping Agency that was included in an over-the-counter cough medicine in South Korea.

In January 2026, An left the PGA Tour to join LIV Golf. He joined as the new captain of the rebranded Korean Golf Club team, replacing Kevin Na. An cited the opportunity to grow his career and expand the Korean golf market as key reasons for the move.

== Amateur wins ==
- 2009 U.S. Amateur

== Professional wins (5) ==
=== European Tour wins (2) ===
Legend
Flagship events (1)
Other European Tour (1)

No.	Date	Tournament	Winning score	To par	Margin of victory	Runner(s)-up
1	24 May 2015	BMW PGA Championship	71-64-67-65=267	−21	6 strokes	(Thailand) Thongchai Jaidee, (Spain) Miguel Ángel Jiménez
2	27 Oct 2024	Genesis Championship^{1}	67-66-71-67=271	−17	Playoff	(South Korea) Tom Kim

^{1}Co-sanctioned by the Korean Tour

European Tour playoff record (1–0)

No.	Year	Tournament	Opponent	Result
1	2024	Genesis Championship	(South Korea) Tom Kim	Won with birdie on first extra hole

=== Korn Ferry Tour wins (1) ===
No.	Date	Tournament	Winning score	To par	Margin of victory	Runners-up
1	20 Feb 2022	LECOM Suncoast Classic	65-66-67-69=267	−17	1 stroke	(South Africa) M. J. Daffue, (United States) Ben Griffin, (United States) Scott Harrington, (South Korea) Kim Seong-hyeon

=== Challenge Tour wins (1) ===
No.	Date	Tournament	Winning score	To par	Margin of victory	Runner-up
1	24 Aug 2014	Rolex Trophy	63-69-73-64=269	−19	3 strokes	(France) Benjamin Hébert

=== Korean Tour wins (2) ===
No.	Date	Tournament	Winning score	To par	Margin of victory	Runner-up
1	20 Sep 2015	Shinhan Donghae Open	66-73-66-67=272	−12	1 stroke	(South Korea) Noh Seung-yul
2	27 Oct 2024	Genesis Championship^{1}	67-66-71-67=271	−17	Playoff	(South Korea) Tom Kim

^{1}Co-sanctioned by the European Tour

Korean Tour playoff record (1–0)

No.	Year	Tournament	Opponent	Result
1	2024	Genesis Championship	(South Korea) Tom Kim	Won with birdie on first extra hole

== Playoff record ==
PGA Tour playoff record (0–3)

No.	Year	Tournament	Opponents	Result
1	2016	Zurich Classic of New Orleans	(United States) Jamie Lovemark, (United States) Brian Stuard	Stuard won with birdie on second extra hole An eliminated by par on first hole
2	2018	Memorial Tournament	(United States) Bryson DeChambeau, (United States) Kyle Stanley	DeChambeau won with birdie on second extra hole Stanley eliminated by par on first hole
3	2024	Sony Open in Hawaii	(United States) Keegan Bradley, (United States) Grayson Murray	Murray won with birdie on first extra hole

European Tour playoff record (1–0)

No.	Year	Tournament	Opponent	Result
1	2024	Genesis Championship	(South Korea) Tom Kim	Won with birdie on first extra hole

== Results in major championships ==
Results not in chronological order in 2020.

Tournament	2010	2011	2012	2013	2014	2015	2016	2017	2018
Masters Tournament	CUT						CUT	T33	
U.S. Open	CUT					CUT	T23	CUT	67
The Open Championship	CUT				T26	CUT	T59	CUT	T51
PGA Championship						CUT	CUT	T28	T56

Tournament	2019	2020	2021	2022	2023	2024	2025
Masters Tournament		CUT				T16	T21
PGA Championship	CUT	T22	T49			T43	74
U.S. Open	T16	CUT				CUT	CUT
The Open Championship	T32	NT	T26		T23	T13	CUT

Did not play

CUT = missed the half-way cut
"T" indicates a tie for a place
NT = no tournament due to COVID-19 pandemic

=== Summary ===
Tournament	Wins	2nd	3rd	Top-5	Top-10	Top-25	Events	Cuts made
Masters Tournament	0	0	0	0	0	2	6	3
PGA Championship	0	0	0	0	0	1	9	6
U.S. Open	0	0	0	0	0	2	9	3
The Open Championship	0	0	0	0	0	2	11	7
Totals	0	0	0	0	0	7	35	19

- Most consecutive cuts made – 5 (2021 PGA – 2024 PGA)
- Longest streak of top-10s – none

== Results in The Players Championship ==
Tournament	2016	2017	2018	2019	2020	2021	2022	2023	2024	2025
The Players Championship	CUT		T30	T26	C	CUT		T35	CUT	T52

Did not play

CUT = missed the halfway cut
"T" indicates a tie for a place
C = Cancelled after the first round due to the COVID-19 pandemic

== Results in World Golf Championships ==
Tournament	2015	2016	2017	2018	2019	2020
Championship		T52	T48		T45	T29
Match Play		T9	T58		T40	NT^{1}
Invitational	T57	T49		T57		T12
Champions	T19	T63		T41	T14	NT^{1}

^{1}Cancelled due to COVID-19 pandemic

Top 10
Did not play

QF, R16, R32, R64 = Round in which player lost in match play
NT = No tournament
"T" = Tied

== Team appearances ==
Professional

- EurAsia Cup (representing Asia): 2016, 2018
- World Cup (representing South Korea): 2016, 2018
- Presidents Cup (representing the International team): 2019, 2024

== See also ==
- 2014 Challenge Tour graduates
- 2022 Korn Ferry Tour Finals graduates
- 2026 European Tour Qualifying School graduates
