= Bernd Wiesberger =

Austrian professional golfer (born 1985)

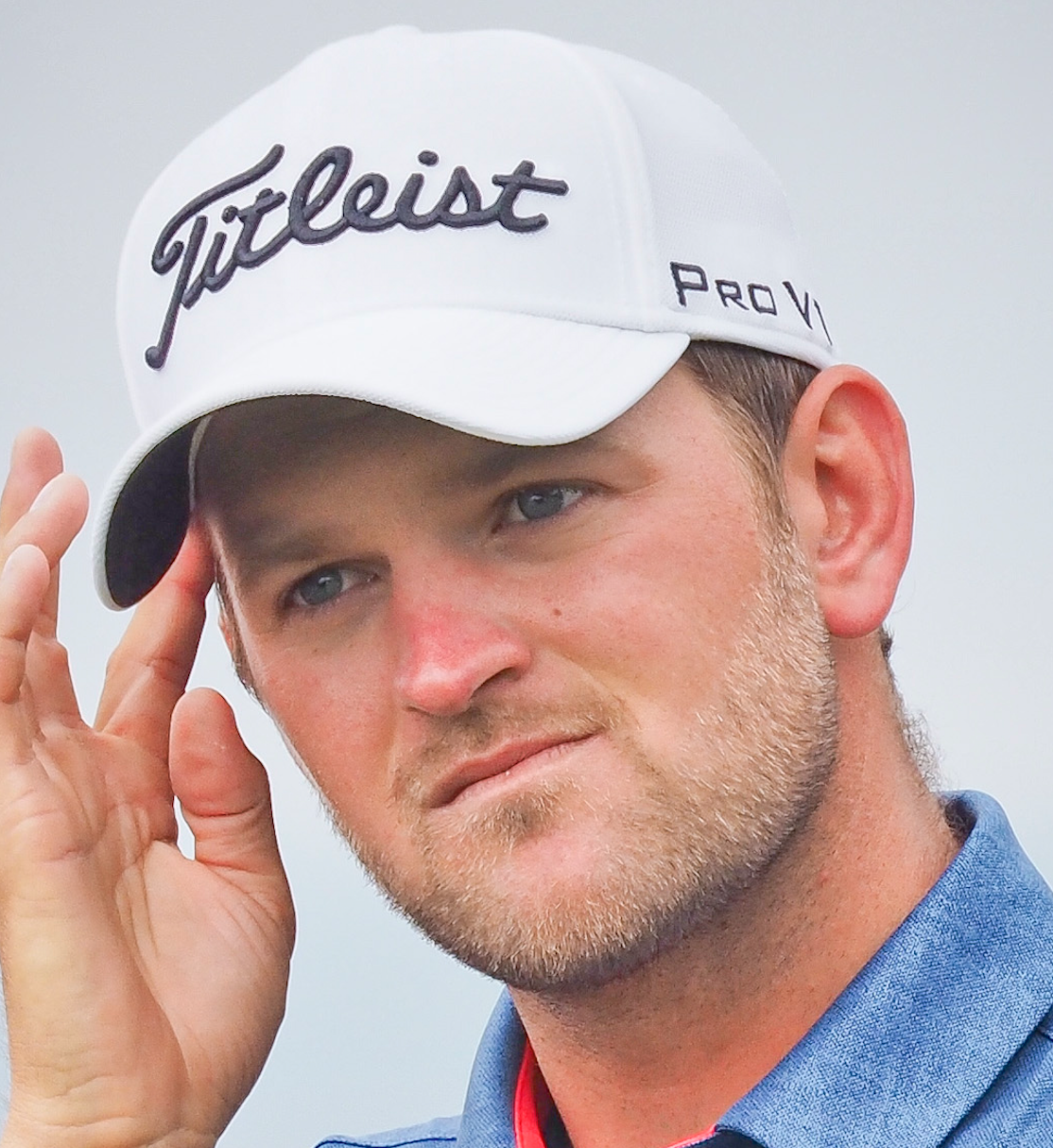

Personal information
- Full name: Bernd Klaus Wiesberger
- Nickname: Burnt Cheeseburger
- Nationality: Austria
- Born: 8 October 1985 (age 41) Vienna, Austria
- Height: 1.88 m (6 ft 2 in)
- Weight: 86 kg (190 lb; 13.5 st)

Career
- Sport: Golf
- Turned professional: 2006
- Current tours: European Tour; PGA Tour
- Former tours: Challenge Tour; LIV Golf
- Professional wins: 13
- Highest ranking: 21 (24 November 2019) (as of 15 November 2026)

Number of wins by tour
- European Tour: 9
- Asian Tour: 2
- Challenge Tour: 2
- Other: 1

Best results in major championships
- Masters Tournament: T22: 2015
- PGA Championship: T15: 2014
- U.S. Open: T16: 2017
- The Open Championship: T32: 2019

Bernd Klaus Wiesberger ([bɛʁnt ˈviːsˌbɛʁɡɐ]; born 8 October 1985) is an Austrian professional golfer who plays on the European Tour and formerly on the LIV Golf League. He finished the 2019 European Tour season in third place on the Race to Dubai standings, his best finish to date.

In July 2015, when he won the Alstom Open de France, Wiesberger became the most successful Austrian golfer on the European Tour with three tour victories. He has since extended his record and is a nine-time winner on the European Tour. He also played in the 2021 Ryder Cup.

== Amateur career ==
Wiesberger was born in Vienna. He won several amateur tournaments, including three Austrian Amateur Stroke Play Championships from 2004 to 2006, the Austrian Amateur Match Play Championship in 2004 and the Austrian Youths Championship in 2004 and 2005. He represented his country at the 2004 and 2006 Eisenhower Trophy. He turned professional in 2006.

== Professional career ==
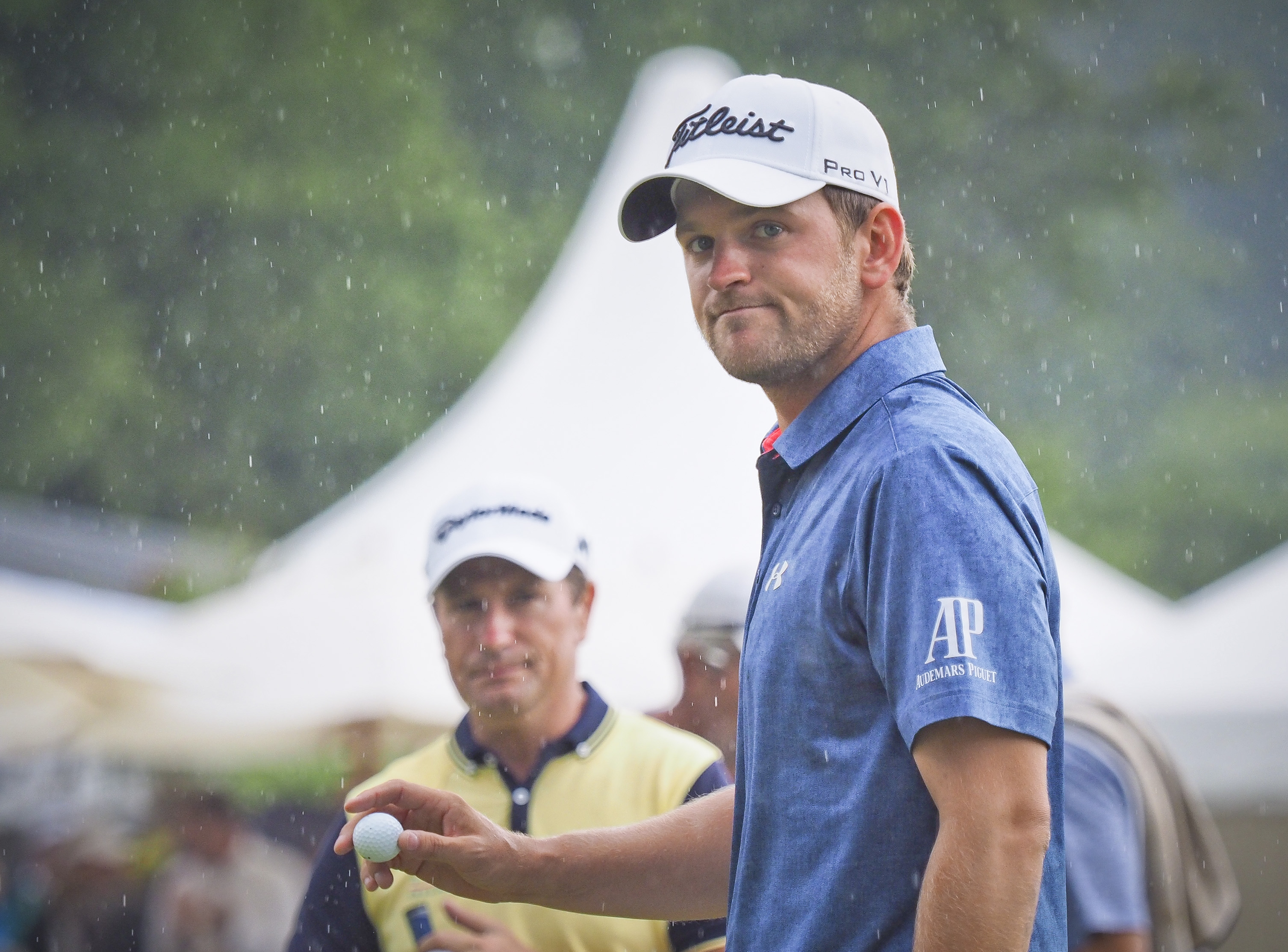
Wiesberger at the 2016 Lyoness Open

Wiesberger played on the Challenge Tour in 2007 and 2008. He earned his European Tour card for the 2009 season through qualifying school. He was unable to win enough money during his rookie season to retain his card and returned to the Challenge Tour. Wiesberger won two events, the Allianz Golf Open de Lyon and the Allianz Golf Open du Grand Toulouse, en route to a 5th-place finish on the Order of Merit, good enough for a European Tour card for 2011.

Wiesberger recorded four top-10 finishes in his return to the European Tour in 2011 including two runner up finishes. He finished 64th on the Order of Merit. Wiesberger claimed his maiden title on the European Tour in 2012 at the Ballantine's Championship, twice setting the course record and winning the championship by the margin of five strokes. The win moved him into the top 100 of the Official World Golf Ranking. In July 2012, Wiesberger won his second title of the year and of his European Tour career at the Lyoness Open, held in his home country of Austria. He started the final round four strokes back of Thorbjørn Olesen, but a round of 65 seven under par, including birdies at three of the last four holes secured a three stroke victory. He became only the second Austrian to win his home Open, after Markus Brier in 2006. After the victory he said: "It's the best day of my life so far. It seems like it went my way, especially the last two holes. I had such a great country and such great fans backing me. I'm very proud to be following in such big footsteps [as Brier]. I'm sure I'm not going to be the last home winner."

On 5 May 2013, Wiesberger won his sixth professional tournament and the second of his career in Asia, beating reigning Open Champion Ernie Els by a shot at the CIMB Niaga Indonesian Masters for his first win of the season.

In 2014, he lost a playoff at his home event, the Austrian Open. However, he earned enough world ranking points to place 60th in the world and become the first Austrian to play in the U.S. Open. Wiesberger had the last guaranteed position for entry and it was the event immediately after the Austrian Open. At the 2014 PGA Championship, Wiesberger was one off the lead of Rory McIlroy after 54 holes at Valhalla Golf Club and was paired with McIlroy in the final round of the championship. However, Wiesberger shot a three-over par round on the final day and finished in a tie for 15th.

In May 2015, Wiesberger lost in a three-man sudden-death playoff at the Dubai Duty Free Irish Open. He started the final round two strokes behind Søren Kjeldsen and despite shooting a 74, entered the playoff with Kjeldsen and Eddie Pepperell. Kjeldsen won on the first extra hole with a birdie. Wiesberger has lost all three sudden-death playoffs in his European Tour career. On 5 July Wiesberger would win his third event on the European Tour when he took the Alstom Open de France. Wiesberger took victory by three strokes over Englishmen James Morrison, Wiesberger had also started the round four strokes back of South African Jaco van Zyl but stormed back with final round 66. With this being his third win on tour, he became the most successful Austrian golfer in the history of the European Tour, moving ahead of Markus Brier, who had two wins; Martin Wiegele was the only other Austrian with a win.

Wiesberger claimed his fourth European Tour victory at the 2017 Shenzhen International. He won with a birdie at the first extra hole, in a sudden-death playoff, to defeat Tommy Fleetwood. Fleetwood had earlier shot a final round of 63 to come from eight strokes back and set the clubhouse lead. Wiesberger had to scramble for pars on the back nine and then almost holed his approach shot on the 72nd hole for the victory. In the playoff, Wiesberger found trouble from the tee, but hit his approach to within five feet for birdie to claim victory. His fourth victory came in his 200th event on the European Tour.

On 26 May 2019, Weisberger won his fifth European Tour title at the Made in Denmark at Himmerland Golf & Spa Resort. He won by shooting a final-round 66. On 14 July 2019, he won the Aberdeen Standard Investments Scottish Open at Renaissance Club in North Berwick, Scotland. He won in a playoff over Benjamin Hébert. On 13 October 2019, he won the Italian Open for his third victory of the European Tour season. This pushed him to first place in the season long Race to Dubai.

In May 2021, Wiesberger successfully defended his title at the Made in HimmerLand event. He shot a final-round 64 to win by five shots and advanced back to the top 50 in the Official World Golf Ranking. Four weeks later he followed that with a tied-for-fifth-place finish at the BMW International Open, to increase his chances of a selection to the 2021 European Ryder Cup team. In August, Wiesberger looked set to claim his ninth European Tour victory at the Omega European Masters. He had a one shot lead going down the final hole, however a double-bogey saw him drop into second place; one shot behind Rasmus Højgaard.

In September 2021, Wiesberger played on the European team in the 2021 Ryder Cup at Whistling Straits in Kohler, Wisconsin, becoming the first Austrian Ryder Cup player ever. The U.S. team won 19–9 and Wiesberger went 0–3–0 including a loss in his Sunday singles match against Brooks Koepka.

In 2022, Wiesberger signed with LIV Golf League. He remained with the league through the 2023 season as a member of the Cleeks GC team. During his time with the league he accumulated fines from the European Tour totalling $1.9 million. Those fines were paid by LIV Golf to enable him to return to playing on the European Tour in 2024 after completing a suspension.

In 2026, Wiesberger won for the ninth time on the European Tour, at the Volvo China Open. That victory and other strong performances during the season saw him in position to secure one of the ten available places on the PGA Tour for 2027.

== Amateur wins ==
- 1997 Austrian Boys Championship
- 2004 Austrian Amateur Match Play Championship, Austrian Amateur Stroke Play Championship
- 2005 Austrian Amateur Stroke Play Championship, Austrian Youths Championship
- 2006 Austrian Amateur Stroke Play Championship, Austrian Youths Championship

== Professional wins (12) ==
=== European Tour wins (9) ===
Legend
Rolex Series (2)
Other European Tour (7)

No.	Date	Tournament	Winning score	To par	Margin of victory	Runner(s)-up
1	29 Apr 2012	Ballantine's Championship^{1}	72-65-65-68=270	−18	5 strokes	(Scotland) Richie Ramsay
2	28 Jul 2012	Lyoness Open	71-66-67-65=269	−19	3 strokes	(France) Thomas Levet, (Republic of Ireland) Shane Lowry
3	5 Jul 2015	Alstom Open de France	68-72-66-65=271	−13	3 strokes	(England) James Morrison
4	23 Apr 2017	Shenzhen International	67-65-69-71=272	−16	Playoff	(England) Tommy Fleetwood
5	26 May 2019	Made in Denmark	68-69-67-66=270	−14	1 stroke	(Scotland) Robert MacIntyre
6	14 Jul 2019	Aberdeen Standard Investments Scottish Open	67-61-65-69=262	−22	Playoff	(France) Benjamin Hébert
7	13 Oct 2019	Italian Open	66-70-67-65=268	−16	1 stroke	(England) Matt Fitzpatrick
8	30 May 2021	Made in HimmerLand (2)	66-65-68-64=263	−21	5 strokes	(Italy) Guido Migliozzi
9	26 Apr 2026	Volvo China Open^{2}	64-66-68-67=265	−19	3 strokes	(United Arab Emirates) Adrián Otaegui

^{1}Co-sanctioned by the Asian Tour and the Korean Tour
^{2}Co-sanctioned by the China Tour

European Tour playoff record (2–3)

No.	Year	Tournament	Opponent(s)	Result
1	2011	Johnnie Walker Championship at Gleneagles	(Denmark) Thomas Bjørn, (South Africa) George Coetzee, (England) Mark Foster, (Spain) Pablo Larrazábal	Bjørn won with birdie on fifth extra hole Foster eliminated by par on fourth hole Larrazábal eliminated by par on second hole Wiesberger eliminated by par on first hole
2	2014	Lyoness Open	(Sweden) Mikael Lundberg	Lost to birdie on first extra hole
3	2015	Dubai Duty Free Irish Open	(Denmark) Søren Kjeldsen, (England) Eddie Pepperell	Kjeldsen won with birdie on first extra hole
4	2017	Shenzhen International	(England) Tommy Fleetwood	Won with birdie on first extra hole
5	2019	Aberdeen Standard Investments Scottish Open	(France) Benjamin Hébert	Won with par on third extra hole

=== Asian Tour wins (2) ===
No.	Date	Tournament	Winning score	To par	Margin of victory	Runner-up
1	29 Apr 2012	Ballantine's Championship^{1}	72-65-65-68=270	−18	5 strokes	(Scotland) Richie Ramsay
2	5 May 2013	CIMB Niaga Indonesian Masters	67-72-67-67=273	−15	1 stroke	(South Africa) Ernie Els

^{1}Co-sanctioned by the European Tour and the Korean Tour

=== Challenge Tour wins (2) ===
No.	Date	Tournament	Winning score	To par	Margin of victory	Runner-up
1	11 Jul 2010	Allianz Golf Open de Lyon	67-67-71-62=267	−17	2 strokes	(Sweden) Joel Sjöholm
2	10 Oct 2010	Allianz Golf Open du Grand Toulouse	70-70-67-68=275	−9	4 strokes	(France) Charles-Édouard Russo

=== Other wins (1) ===
- 2012 Zurich Open

== Results in major championships ==
Results not in chronological order in 2020.

Tournament	2012	2013	2014	2015	2016	2017	2018
Masters Tournament				T22	T34	T43	T24
U.S. Open			CUT	CUT	CUT	T16	
The Open Championship		T64	CUT	T68	CUT	T74	
PGA Championship	CUT	CUT	T15	CUT	CUT	CUT	

Tournament	2019	2020	2021	2022	2023	2024	2025	2026
Masters Tournament		58	T40					
PGA Championship		T43	CUT	T30				CUT
U.S. Open	76	T43	CUT					
The Open Championship	T32	NT	T59	CUT				CUT

Did not play

CUT = missed the half-way cut
"T" indicates a tie for a place
NT = no tournament due to COVID-19 pandemic

=== Summary ===
Tournament	Wins	2nd	3rd	Top-5	Top-10	Top-25	Events	Cuts made
Masters Tournament	0	0	0	0	0	2	6	6
PGA Championship	0	0	0	0	0	1	10	3
U.S. Open	0	0	0	0	0	1	7	3
The Open Championship	0	0	0	0	0	0	9	5
Totals	0	0	0	0	0	4	32	17

- Most consecutive cuts made – 7 (2018 Masters – 2021 Masters)
- Longest streak of top-10s – 0

== Results in The Players Championship ==
Tournament	2015	2016	2017	2018	2019	2020	2021
The Players Championship	CUT		T12			C	CUT

Did not play

CUT = missed the half-way cut
"T" indicates a tie for a place
C = Cancelled after the first round due to the COVID-19 pandemic

== Results in World Golf Championships ==
Results not in chronological order before 2015.

Tournament	2012	2013	2014	2015	2016	2017	2018	2019	2020	2021
Championship				T31	T14	T45	T30		T37	T59
Match Play			R64	T34	T51	T17	T29		NT^{1}	T42
Invitational	T55			T25		T41			74	
Champions	T28			T17	T35	T9		T49	NT^{1}	NT^{1}

^{1}Cancelled due to COVID-19 pandemic

Top 10
Did not play

QF, R16, R32, R64 = Round in which player lost in match play
NT = no tournament
"T" = tied

== Team appearances ==
Amateur

- European Boys' Team Championship (representing Austria): 2002, 2003
- Eisenhower Trophy (representing Austria): 2004, 2006
- European Amateur Team Championship (representing Austria): 2005
- Jacques Léglise Trophy (representing Continental Europe): 2003
- European Youth's Team Championship (representing Austria): 2006

Professional

- World Cup (representing Austria): 2013, 2016
- Royal Trophy (representing Europe): 2013 (winners)
- EurAsia Cup (representing Europe): 2016 (winners), 2018 (winners)
- Ryder Cup (representing Europe): 2021

== See also ==
- 2008 European Tour Qualifying School graduates
- 2010 Challenge Tour graduates
- 2026 Race to Dubai dual card winners
- List of golfers with most European Tour wins
