= 2017 WGC-Dell Technologies Match Play =

Tournament information
- Dates: March 22–26, 2017
- Location: Austin, Texas, U.S. 30.343°N 97.797°W
- Course: Austin Country Club
- Tours: PGA Tour; European Tour; Japan Golf Tour
- Format: Match play – 18 holes

Statistics
- Par: 71
- Length: 7,108 yards (6,500 m)
- Field: 64 players
- Prize fund: $9,750,000 €9,042,850
- Winner's share: $1,660,000 €1,539,603

Champion
- (United States) Dustin Johnson
- def. Jon Rahm 1 up

Location map
- Location in Texas Location in the United States

The 2017 WGC-Dell Technologies Match Play was the 19th WGC Match Play, played March 22–26 at Austin Country Club in Austin, Texas. It was the second of four World Golf Championships in 2017. Dustin Johnson won the final 1 up over Jon Rahm.

== Field ==
The field consists of the top 64 players available from the Official World Golf Ranking on March 12. However, the seedings are based on the World Rankings on March 19.

Henrik Stenson (ranked 5 on March 12, personal reasons), Adam Scott (8, personal reasons), Justin Rose (13, personal reasons), and Adam Hadwin (51, personal reasons) did not compete, allowing entry for Jason Dufner (ranked 65), Kim Kyung-tae (66), Joost Luiten (67) and Pat Perez (68). On March 17, world number nine Rickie Fowler dropped out, replaced by Kim Si-woo (69).

== Format ==
In 2014 and earlier editions, the championship was a single elimination match play event. A new format was introduced in 2015, and the championship now starts with pool play, with 16 groups of four players playing round-robin matches, on Wednesday through Friday. The top 16 seeded players are allocated to the 16 groups, one in each group. The remaining 48 players are placed into three pools (seeds 17–32, seeds 33–48, seeds 49–64). Each group has one player randomly selected from each pool to complete the group.

All group play matches are limited to 18 holes with one point awarded for a win and one-half point for a halved match. Ties for first place in a group are broken by a sudden-death stroke play playoff, beginning on hole 1.

The winners of each group advance to a single-elimination bracket on the weekend, with the round of 16 and quarterfinals on Saturday, and the semi-finals, finals, and consolation match on Sunday.

Pool A – Top 16 seeds
| Seed | Rank | Player |
|---|---|---|
| 1 | 1 | (United States) Dustin Johnson |
| 2 | 2 | (Northern Ireland) Rory McIlroy |
| 3 | 3 | (Australia) Jason Day |
| 4 | 4 | (Japan) Hideki Matsuyama |
| 5 | 6 | (United States) Jordan Spieth |
| 6 | 7 | (United States) Justin Thomas |
| 7 | 10 | (Spain) Sergio García |
| 8 | 11 | (Sweden) Alex Norén |
| 9 | 12 | (United States) Patrick Reed |
| 10 | 14 | (England) Tyrrell Hatton |
| 11 | 15 | (England) Danny Willett |
| 12 | 16 | (England) Paul Casey |
| 13 | 17 | (United States) Bubba Watson |
| 14 | 18 | (United States) Phil Mickelson |
| 15 | 19 | (South Africa) Branden Grace |
| 16 | 20 | (United States) Matt Kuchar |

Pool B
| Seed | Rank | Player |
|---|---|---|
| 17 | 21 | (Scotland) Russell Knox |
| 18 | 22 | (United States) Jimmy Walker |
| 19 | 23 | (United States) Brandt Snedeker |
| 20 | 24 | (United States) Brooks Koepka |
| 21 | 25 | (Spain) Jon Rahm |
| 22 | 26 | (Spain) Rafa Cabrera-Bello |
| 23 | 27 | (South Africa) Louis Oosthuizen |
| 24 | 28 | (South Africa) Charl Schwartzel |
| 25 | 29 | (Italy) Francesco Molinari |
| 26 | 30 | (Argentina) Emiliano Grillo |
| 27 | 31 | (England) Matt Fitzpatrick |
| 28 | 32 | (Australia) Marc Leishman |
| 29 | 33 | (England) Tommy Fleetwood |
| 30 | 34 | (Belgium) Thomas Pieters |
| 31 | 35 | (United States) J. B. Holmes |
| 32 | 36 | (United States) Ryan Moore |

Pool C
| Seed | Rank | Player |
|---|---|---|
| 33 | 37 | (United States) Gary Woodland |
| 34 | 38 | (United States) Kevin Kisner |
| 35 | 39 | (United States) Daniel Berger |
| 36 | 40 | (Austria) Bernd Wiesberger |
| 37 | 41 | (Japan) Yuta Ikeda |
| 38 | 42 | (United States) Kevin Chappell |
| 39 | 43 | (United States) Scott Piercy |
| 40 | 45 | (South Korea) Wang Jeung-hun |
| 41 | 46 | (Germany) Martin Kaymer |
| 42 | 47 | (United States) Bill Haas |
| 43 | 49 | (England) Lee Westwood |
| 44 | 50 | (United States) Zach Johnson |
| 45 | 51 | (South Korea) An Byeong-hun |
| 46 | 52 | (United States) Kevin Na |
| 47 | 53 | (England) Ross Fisher |
| 48 | 54 | (United States) William McGirt |

Pool D
| Seed | Rank | Player |
|---|---|---|
| 49 | 55 | (England) Chris Wood |
| 50 | 56 | (United States) Brendan Steele |
| 51 | 57 | (United States) Jim Furyk |
| 52 | 58 | (England) Andy Sullivan |
| 53 | 59 | (Republic of Ireland) Shane Lowry |
| 54 | 60 | (Japan) Hideto Tanihara |
| 55 | 61 | (Venezuela) Jhonattan Vegas |
| 56 | 62 | (United States) Pat Perez |
| 57 | 63 | (Thailand) Thongchai Jaidee |
| 58 | 64 | (United States) Webb Simpson |
| 59 | 65 | (United States) Jason Dufner |
| 60 | 66 | (Netherlands) Joost Luiten |
| 61 | 67 | (United States) Charles Howell III |
| 62 | 68 | (Denmark) Søren Kjeldsen |
| 63 | 69 | (South Korea) Kim Si-woo |
| 64 | 70 | (South Korea) Kim Kyung-tae |

Rank – Official World Golf Ranking on March 19, 2017.

== Results ==
=== Pool play ===
Players were divided into 16 groups of four players and played round-robin matches Wednesday to Friday.

- Round 1 – March 22
- Round 2 – March 23
- Round 3 – March 24

Notes: Round 1

Of the 32 matches played, 10 were "upsets" with the lower seeded player beating the higher seeded player and 5 matches were halved. These included top seeds #2 Rory McIlroy, #5 Jordan Spieth, and #11 Danny Willett losing matches, #3 Jason Day conceding his match and withdrawing from the tournament and #4 Hideki Matsuyama, #7 Sergio García, #9 Patrick Reed, and #16 Matt Kuchar halving matches.

Notes: Round 2

Of the 32 matches played, 15 were upsets with the lower seeded player beating the higher seeded player and 2 matches were halved. These included top seeds #4 Hideki Matsuyama, #6 Justin Thomas, #9 Patrick Reed, #15 Branden Grace and #16 Matt Kuchar losing matches and #3 Jason Day conceding his match. Gary Woodland withdrew from the tournament for personal reasons, conceding his second- and third-round matches and Francesco Molinari withdrew after the second round with a wrist injury, conceding his third-round match. There were 14 players that had perfect 2–0–0 records, including the top seed, Dustin Johnson.

Notes: Round 3

Of the 32 matches played, 14 were upsets with the lower seeded player beating the higher seeded player and 3 matches were halved. These included top seeds #3 Jason Day (concession), #4 Hideki Matsuyama, #6 Justin Thomas, #7 Sergio García, #9 Patrick Reed, #10 Tyrrell Hatton, and #15 Danny Willett losing matches and #2 Rory McIlroy, #5 Jordan Spieth, and #13 Bubba Watson halving matches. Five groups went to sudden-death playoffs, three involving two players and two involving three players. The playoffs went from one to six holes. Eight golfers advanced with perfect 3–0–0 records: #1 Dustin Johnson, #8 Alex Norén, #12 Paul Casey, #14 Phil Mickelson, #20 Brooks Koepka, #21 Jon Rahm, #48 William McGirt, and #62 Søren Kjeldsen. Five of the top 16 seeds advanced while three of the bottom 16 seeds advanced. Nine Americans advance to the round of 16.

Group 1
| Round | Winner | Score | Loser |
|---|---|---|---|
| 1 | D Johnson | 5 & 3 | Simpson |
| 1 | Kaymer | 3 & 2 | Walker |
| 2 | D Johnson | 3 & 2 | Kaymer |
| 2 | Walker | 3 & 2 | Simpson |
| 3 | D Johnson | 5 & 3 | Walker |
| 3 | Kaymer | 3 & 2 | Simpson |

| Seed | Player | W | L | H | Points | Finish |
|---|---|---|---|---|---|---|
| 1 | (United States) Dustin Johnson | 3 | 0 | 0 | 3 | 1 |
| 46 | (Germany) Martin Kaymer | 2 | 1 | 0 | 2 | 2 |
| 22 | (United States) Jimmy Walker | 1 | 2 | 0 | 1 | 3 |
| 58 | (United States) Webb Simpson | 0 | 3 | 0 | 0 | 4 |

Group 2
| Round | Winner | Score | Loser |
|---|---|---|---|
| 1 | Kjeldsen | 2 & 1 | McIlroy |
| 1 | Woodland | 3 & 2 | Grillo |
| 2 | McIlroy | Conceded | Woodland |
| 2 | Kjeldsen | 4 & 3 | Grillo |
| 3 | McIlroy vs Grillo – halved | | |
| 3 | Kjeldsen | Conceded | Woodland |

| Seed | Player | W | L | H | Points | Finish |
|---|---|---|---|---|---|---|
| 62 | (Denmark) Søren Kjeldsen | 3 | 0 | 0 | 3 | 1 |
| 2 | (Northern Ireland) Rory McIlroy | 1 | 1 | 1 | 1.5 | 2 |
| 33 | (United States) Gary Woodland | 1 | 2 | 0 | 1 | 3 |
| 26 | (Argentina) Emiliano Grillo | 0 | 2 | 1 | 0.5 | 4 |

- Woodland withdrew from the tournament prior to the second round,
  conceding matches to McIlroy and Kjeldsen.

Group 3
| Round | Winner | Score | Loser |
|---|---|---|---|
| 1 | Perez | Conceded | Day |
| 1 | Leishman | 3 & 2 | Westwood |
| 2 | Westwood | Conceded | Day |
| 2 | Perez | 2 & 1 | Leishman |
| 3 | Leishman | Conceded | Day |
| 3 | Westwood | 2 & 1 | Perez |

| Seed | Player | W | L | H | Points | Finish |
|---|---|---|---|---|---|---|
| 28 | (Australia) Marc Leishman | 2 | 1 | 0 | 2 | 1 |
| 43 | (England) Lee Westwood | 2 | 1 | 0 | 2 | T2 |
| 56 | (United States) Pat Perez | 2 | 1 | 0 | 2 | T2 |
| 3 | (Australia) Jason Day | 0 | 3 | 0 | 0 | 4 |

- Day conceded his match with Perez after 6 holes
  (Perez 3 up) and withdrew from the tournament.
- Leishman advanced in sudden-death playoff
  over Perez and Westwood – 2 holes.

Group 4
| Round | Winner | Score | Loser |
|---|---|---|---|
| 1 | Matsuyama vs Furyk – halved | | |
| 1 | Oosthuizen | 4 & 3 | Fisher |
| 2 | Fisher | 2 & 1 | Matsuyama |
| 2 | Furyk | 3 & 2 | Oosthuizen |
| 3 | Oosthuizen | 6 & 4 | Matsuyama |
| 3 | Fisher | 4 & 2 | Furyk |

| Seed | Player | W | L | H | Points | Finish |
|---|---|---|---|---|---|---|
| 47 | (England) Ross Fisher | 2 | 1 | 0 | 2 | 1 |
| 23 | (South Africa) Louis Oosthuizen | 2 | 1 | 0 | 2 | 2 |
| 51 | (United States) Jim Furyk | 1 | 1 | 1 | 1.5 | 3 |
| 4 | (Japan) Hideki Matsuyama | 0 | 2 | 1 | 0.5 | 4 |

- Fisher advanced in sudden-death playoff over Oosthuizen – 2 holes

Group 5
| Round | Winner | Score | Loser |
|---|---|---|---|
| 1 | Tanihara | 4 & 2 | Spieth |
| 1 | Moore vs Ikeda – halved | | |
| 2 | Spieth | 4 & 2 | Ikeda |
| 2 | Moore vs Tanihara – halved | | |
| 3 | Spieth vs Moore – halved | | |
| 3 | Tanihara | 3 & 1 | Ikeda |

| Seed | Player | W | L | H | Points | Finish |
|---|---|---|---|---|---|---|
| 54 | (Japan) Hideto Tanihara | 2 | 0 | 1 | 2.5 | 1 |
| 5 | (United States) Jordan Spieth | 1 | 1 | 1 | 1.5 | T2 |
| 32 | (United States) Ryan Moore | 0 | 0 | 3 | 1.5 | T2 |
| 41 | (Japan) Yuta Ikeda | 0 | 2 | 1 | 0.5 | 4 |

Group 6
| Round | Winner | Score | Loser |
|---|---|---|---|
| 1 | Thomas | 2 & 1 | Wood |
| 1 | Na | 5 & 4 | Fitzpatrick |
| 2 | Na | 4 & 2 | Thomas |
| 2 | Fitzpatrick | 4 & 2 | Wood |
| 3 | Fitzpatrick | 2 & 1 | Thomas |
| 3 | Wood | 2 & 1 | Na |

| Seed | Player | W | L | H | Points | Finish |
|---|---|---|---|---|---|---|
| 46 | (United States) Kevin Na | 2 | 1 | 0 | 2 | 1 |
| 27 | (England) Matt Fitzpatrick | 2 | 1 | 0 | 2 | 2 |
| 6 | (United States) Justin Thomas | 1 | 2 | 0 | 1 | T3 |
| 49 | (England) Chris Wood | 1 | 2 | 0 | 1 | T3 |

- Na advanced in sudden-death playoff over Fitzpatrick – 1 hole.

Group 7
| Round | Winner | Score | Loser |
|---|---|---|---|
| 1 | García vs Lowry – halved | | |
| 1 | Rahm | 3 & 2 | Chappell |
| 2 | García | 4 & 3 | Chappell |
| 2 | Rahm | 2 & 1 | Lowry |
| 3 | Rahm | 6 & 4 | García |
| 3 | Chappell | 1 up | Lowry |

| Seed | Player | W | L | H | Points | Finish |
|---|---|---|---|---|---|---|
| 21 | (Spain) Jon Rahm | 3 | 0 | 0 | 3 | 1 |
| 7 | (Spain) Sergio García | 1 | 1 | 1 | 1.5 | 2 |
| 38 | (United States) Kevin Chappell | 1 | 2 | 0 | 1 | 3 |
| 53 | (Republic of Ireland) Shane Lowry | 0 | 2 | 1 | 0.5 | 4 |

Group 8
| Round | Winner | Score | Loser |
|---|---|---|---|
| 1 | Norén | 3 & 2 | Jaidee |
| 1 | Wiesberger | 2 up | Molinari |
| 2 | Norén | 3 & 2 | Wiesberger |
| 2 | Jaidee | 5 & 3 | Molinari |
| 3 | Norén | Conceded | Molinari |
| 3 | Wiesberger | 1 up | Jaidee |

| Seed | Player | W | L | H | Points | Finish |
|---|---|---|---|---|---|---|
| 8 | (Sweden) Alex Norén | 3 | 0 | 0 | 3 | 1 |
| 36 | (Austria) Bernd Wiesberger | 2 | 1 | 0 | 2 | 2 |
| 57 | (Thailand) Thongchai Jaidee | 1 | 2 | 0 | 1 | 3 |
| 25 | (Italy) Francesco Molinari | 0 | 3 | 0 | 0 | 4 |

- Molinari withdrew from the tournament after the second round
  with a wrist injury, conceding his third-round match to Norén.

Group 9
| Round | Winner | Score | Loser |
|---|---|---|---|
| 1 | Reed vs Dufner – halved | | |
| 1 | Koepka | 6 & 5 | Kisner |
| 2 | Kisner | 1 up | Reed |
| 2 | Koepka | 6 & 5 | Dufner |
| 3 | Koepka | 1 up | Reed |
| 3 | Kisner | 2 & 1 | Dufner |

| Seed | Player | W | L | H | Points | Finish |
|---|---|---|---|---|---|---|
| 20 | (United States) Brooks Koepka | 3 | 0 | 0 | 3 | 1 |
| 34 | (United States) Kevin Kisner | 2 | 1 | 0 | 2 | 2 |
| 9 | (United States) Patrick Reed | 0 | 2 | 1 | 0.5 | T3 |
| 59 | (United States) Jason Dufner | 0 | 2 | 1 | 0.5 | T3 |

Group 10
| Round | Winner | Score | Loser |
|---|---|---|---|
| 1 | Hatton | 2 & 1 | Howell |
| 1 | Cabrera-Bello | 4 & 3 | Wang |
| 2 | Hatton | 2 up | Wang |
| 2 | Howell | 1 up | Cabrera-Bello |
| 3 | Cabrera-Bello | 2 & 1 | Hatton |
| 3 | Howell | 2 & 1 | Wang |

| Seed | Player | W | L | H | Points | Finish |
|---|---|---|---|---|---|---|
| 61 | (United States) Charles Howell III | 2 | 1 | 0 | 2 | 1 |
| 10 | (England) Tyrrell Hatton | 2 | 1 | 0 | 2 | T2 |
| 22 | (Spain) Rafa Cabrera-Bello | 2 | 1 | 0 | 2 | T2 |
| 40 | (South Korea) Wang Jeung-hun | 0 | 3 | 0 | 0 | 4 |

- Howell advanced in sudden-death playoff
  over Hatton and Cabrera-Bello– 6 holes.

Group 11
| Round | Winner | Score | Loser |
|---|---|---|---|
| 1 | KT Kim | 4 & 2 | Willett |
| 1 | Knox | 3 & 2 | Haas |
| 2 | Haas | 6 & 5 | Willett |
| 2 | KT Kim | 3 & 1 | Knox |
| 3 | Willett | 4 & 2 | Knox |
| 3 | Haas | 4 & 2 | KT Kim |

| Seed | Player | W | L | H | Points | Finish |
|---|---|---|---|---|---|---|
| 42 | (United States) Bill Haas | 2 | 1 | 0 | 2 | 1 |
| 64 | (South Korea) Kim Kyung-tae | 2 | 1 | 0 | 2 | 2 |
| 11 | (England) Danny Willett | 1 | 2 | 0 | 1 | T3 |
| 17 | (Scotland) Russell Knox | 1 | 2 | 0 | 1 | T3 |

- Haas advanced in sudden-death playoff over Kim – 6 holes.

Group 12
| Round | Winner | Score | Loser |
|---|---|---|---|
| 1 | Casey | 2 & 1 | Luiten |
| 1 | Schwartzel | 6 & 5 | An |
| 2 | Casey | 1 up | An |
| 2 | Schwartzel | 4 & 3 | Luiten |
| 3 | Casey | 4 & 3 | Schwartzel |
| 3 | Luiten | 1 up | An |

| Seed | Player | W | L | H | Points | Finish |
|---|---|---|---|---|---|---|
| 12 | (England) Paul Casey | 3 | 0 | 0 | 3 | 1 |
| 24 | (South Africa) Charl Schwartzel | 2 | 1 | 0 | 2 | 2 |
| 60 | (Netherlands) Joost Luiten | 1 | 2 | 0 | 1 | 3 |
| 45 | (South Korea) An Byeong-hun | 0 | 3 | 0 | 0 | 4 |

Group 13
| Round | Winner | Score | Loser |
|---|---|---|---|
| 1 | Watson | 1 up | Vegas |
| 1 | Pieters | 3 & 2 | Piercy |
| 2 | Watson | 4 & 3 | Piercy |
| 2 | Vegas | 3 & 1 | Pieters |
| 3 | Watson vs Pieters – halved | | |
| 3 | Vegas | 3 & 1 | Piercy |

| Seed | Player | W | L | H | Points | Finish |
|---|---|---|---|---|---|---|
| 13 | (United States) Bubba Watson | 2 | 0 | 1 | 2.5 | 1 |
| 55 | (Venezuela) Jhonattan Vegas | 2 | 1 | 0 | 2 | 2 |
| 30 | (Belgium) Thomas Pieters | 1 | 1 | 1 | 1.5 | 3 |
| 39 | (United States) Scott Piercy | 0 | 3 | 0 | 0 | 4 |

Group 14
| Round | Winner | Score | Loser |
|---|---|---|---|
| 1 | Mickelson | 5 & 3 | SW Kim |
| 1 | Berger | 7 & 5 | Holmes |
| 2 | Mickelson | 5 & 4 | Berger |
| 2 | Holmes vs SW Kim – halved | | |
| 3 | Mickelson | 6 & 5 | Holmes |
| 3 | SW Kim | 1 up | Berger |

| Seed | Player | W | L | H | Points | Finish |
|---|---|---|---|---|---|---|
| 14 | (United States) Phil Mickelson | 3 | 0 | 0 | 3 | 1 |
| 63 | (South Korea) Kim Si-woo | 1 | 1 | 1 | 1.5 | 2 |
| 35 | (United States) Daniel Berger | 1 | 2 | 0 | 1 | 3 |
| 31 | (United States) J. B. Holmes | 0 | 2 | 1 | 0.5 | 4 |

Group 15
| Round | Winner | Score | Loser |
|---|---|---|---|
| 1 | Grace | 4 & 2 | Sullivan |
| 1 | McGirt | 2 up | Snedeker |
| 2 | McGirt | 2 & 1 | Grace |
| 2 | Snedeker | 2 & 1 | Sullivan |
| 3 | Snedeker | 5 & 4 | Grace |
| 3 | McGirt | 1 up | Sullivan |

| Seed | Player | W | L | H | Points | Finish |
|---|---|---|---|---|---|---|
| 48 | (United States) William McGirt | 3 | 0 | 0 | 3 | 1 |
| 19 | (United States) Brandt Snedeker | 2 | 1 | 0 | 2 | 2 |
| 15 | (South Africa) Branden Grace | 1 | 2 | 0 | 1 | 3 |
| 52 | (England) Andy Sullivan | 0 | 3 | 0 | 0 | 4 |

Group 16
| Round | Winner | Score | Loser |
|---|---|---|---|
| 1 | Kuchar vs Steele – halved | | |
| 1 | Fleetwood | 1 up | Z Johnson |
| 2 | Z Johnson | 2 up | Kuchar |
| 2 | Steele | 1 up | Fleetwood |
| 3 | Kuchar | 4 & 2 | Fleetwood |
| 3 | Z Johnson | 1 up | Steele |

| Seed | Player | W | L | H | Points | Finish |
|---|---|---|---|---|---|---|
| 44 | (United States) Zach Johnson | 2 | 1 | 0 | 2 | 1 |
| 16 | (United States) Matt Kuchar | 1 | 1 | 1 | 1.5 | T2 |
| 50 | (United States) Brendan Steele | 1 | 1 | 1 | 1.5 | T2 |
| 29 | (England) Tommy Fleetwood | 1 | 2 | 0 | 1 | 4 |

=== Final 16 bracket ===
First round March 25 – morning
1 | (United States) Dustin Johnson | 5&4
44 | (United States) Zach Johnson
8 | (Sweden) Alex Norén | 3&1
20 | (United States) Brooks Koepka
47 | (England) Ross Fisher | 4&3
13 | (United States) Bubba Watson
54 | (Japan) Hideto Tanihara | 2&1
12 | (England) Paul Casey
62 | (Denmark) Søren Kjeldsen | 5&4
48 | (United States) William McGirt
21 | (Spain) Jon Rahm | 6&4
61 | (United States) Charles Howell III
28 | (Australia) Marc Leishman
14 | (United States) Phil Mickelson | 4&3
46 | (United States) Kevin Na
42 | (United States) Bill Haas | 1up

Quarter-finals; March 25 – afternoon
1 | (United States) Dustin Johnson | 3&2
8 | (Sweden) Alex Norén
47 | (England) Ross Fisher
54 | (Japan) Hideto Tanihara | 4&2
62 | (Denmark) Søren Kjeldsen
21 | (Spain) Jon Rahm | 7&5
14 | (United States) Phil Mickelson
42 | (United States) Bill Haas | 2&1

Semi-finals; March 26 – morning
1 | (United States) Dustin Johnson | 1up
54 | (Japan) Hideto Tanihara
21 | (Spain) Jon Rahm | 3&2
42 | (United States) Bill Haas

Final; March 26 – afternoon
1 | (United States) Dustin Johnson | 1up
21 | (Spain) Jon Rahm
Third place
54 | (Japan) Hideto Tanihara
42 | (United States) Bill Haas | 2&1

== Prize money breakdown ==
| Place | Description | US ($) |
|---|---|---|
| 1 | Champion | 1,660,000 |
| 2 | Runner-up | 1,045,000 |
| 3 | Third place | 678,000 |
| 4 | Fourth place | 545,000 |
| T5 | Losing quarter-finalists x 4 | 298,000 |
| T9 | Losing round of 16 x 8 | 158,000 |
| T17 | Those with 2 points in pool play x 13 | 93,308 |
| T30 | Those with 1.5 points in pool play x 9 | 74,000 |
| T39 | Those with 1 point in pool play x 12 | 63,500 |
| T51 | Those with 0.5 points in pool play x 7 | 54,071 |
| T58 | Those with 0 points in pool play x 7 | 49,500 |
| | Total | 9,750,000 |
