= 2016 WGC-Bridgestone Invitational =

Coordinates: 41.008°N 81.508°W

Tournament information
- Dates: June 30 – July 3, 2016
- Location: Akron, Ohio, U.S.
- Course(s): Firestone Country Club; South Course
- Tour(s): PGA Tour (not a European Tour event in 2016)

Statistics
- Par: 70
- Length: 7,400 yards (6,767 m)
- Field: 61 players
- Cut: None
- Prize fund: $9.5 million
- Winner's share: $1.62 million

Champion
- (United States) Dustin Johnson
- 274 (−6)

Location in the United States
Location in Ohio

The 2016 WGC-Bridgestone Invitational was a professional golf tournament played June 30 – July 3 on the South Course of Firestone Country Club in Akron, Ohio. It was the 18th WGC-Bridgestone Invitational tournament, and the third of the World Golf Championships events in 2016.

The event was played more than a month earlier than usual, due to the 2016 Summer Olympics. It was only sanctioned by the PGA Tour, because it ran opposite the Open de France the European Tour did not co-sanction the tournament this year.

Dustin Johnson won his first WGC-Bridgestone Invitational and third WGC overall.

== Venue ==
=== Course layout ===
The South Course was designed by Bert Way and redesigned by Robert Trent Jones in 1960.

Hole	1	2	3	4	5	6	7	8	9	Out	10	11	12	13	14	15	16	17	18	In	Total
Yards	399	526	442	471	200	469	219	482	494	3702	410	418	180	471	467	221	667	400	464	3698	7400
Par	4	5	4	4	3	4	3	4	4	35	4	4	3	4	4	3	5	4	4	35	70

== Field ==
The field consisted of players drawn primarily from the Official World Golf Ranking and the winners of the worldwide tournaments with the strongest fields.

1. Playing members of the 2015 United States and International Presidents Cup teams.

Steven Bowditch, Jason Day (2,3,4), Rickie Fowler (2,3,4), Branden Grace (2,3,4), Bill Haas (2,3), J. B. Holmes (2,3), Dustin Johnson (2,3,4), Zach Johnson (2,3), Chris Kirk, Matt Kuchar (2,3), Anirban Lahiri, Danny Lee (2,3), Marc Leishman (2,3,4), Hideki Matsuyama (2,3,4), Phil Mickelson (2,3), Louis Oosthuizen (2,3), Patrick Reed (2,3), Charl Schwartzel (2,3,4), Adam Scott (2,3,4), Jordan Spieth (2,3,4), Jimmy Walker (2,3), Bubba Watson (2,3,4)

- Bae Sang-moon was unable to compete due to a military obligation in South Korea.
- Thongchai Jaidee (4) opted to compete in the Open de France.

2. The top 50 players from the Official World Golf Ranking as of June 20, 2016.

An Byeong-hun (3), Daniel Berger (3,4), Paul Casey (3), Kevin Chappell (3), Harris English, Jim Furyk (3), Emiliano Grillo (3,4), Charley Hoffman (3,4), Kim Kyung-tae (3), Kevin Kisner (3,4), Søren Kjeldsen (3), Russell Knox (3,4), Brooks Koepka (3), David Lingmerth (3), Shane Lowry (3,4), William McGirt (3,4), Kevin Na (3), Scott Piercy (3), Justin Rose (3,4), Brandt Snedeker (3,4), Justin Thomas (3,4)

- Rafa Cabrera-Bello (3), Matt Fitzpatrick (3,4), Rory McIlroy (3,4), Andy Sullivan (3), Lee Westwood (3), Bernd Wiesberger (3), Danny Willett (3,4), and Chris Wood (3,4) opted to compete in the Open de France.
- Sergio García (3,4) and Henrik Stenson (3,4) did not play.

3. The top 50 players from the Official World Golf Ranking as of June 27, 2016.

Kiradech Aphibarnrat

4. Tournament winners, whose victories are considered official, of tournaments from the Federation Tours since the prior season's Bridgestone Invitational with an Official World Golf Ranking Strength of Field Rating of 115 points or more.

Jason Dufner, Marcus Fraser, Fabián Gómez, James Hahn, Jim Herman, Billy Hurley III, Andrew Johnston, Matt Jones, Smylie Kaufman, Davis Love III, Song Young-han, Brian Stuard, Vaughn Taylor

- Kristoffer Broberg, Victor Dubuisson, and Thorbjørn Olesen opted to compete in the Open de France.

5. The winner of selected tournaments from each of the following tours:

- Asian Tour: Thailand Golf Championship (2015) – Jamie Donaldson (opted to compete in the Open de France)
- PGA Tour of Australasia: Australian PGA Championship (2015) – Nathan Holman
- Japan Golf Tour: Bridgestone Open (2015) – Michio Matsumura
- Japan Golf Tour: Japan Golf Tour Championship – Yosuke Tsukada
- Sunshine Tour: Dimension Data Pro-Am – George Coetzee

== Round summaries ==
=== First round ===
Thursday, June 30, 2016

Place	Player	Score	To par
1	(United States) William McGirt	64	−6
T2	(Australia) Jason Day	67	−3
T2	(Argentina) Emiliano Grillo	67	−3
T2	(United States) Jimmy Walker	67	−3
T5	(United States) Rickie Fowler	68	−2
T5	(United States) Charley Hoffman	68	−2
T5	(India) Anirban Lahiri	68	−2
T5	(United States) Jordan Spieth	68	−2
T9	(United States) Harris English	69	−1
T9	(South Africa) Branden Grace	69	−1
T9	(United States) Billy Hurley III	69	−1
T9	(United States) Dustin Johnson	69	−1
T9	(United States) Kevin Kisner	69	−1
T9	(United States) Matt Kuchar	69	−1
T9	(United States) Scott Piercy	69	−1
T9	(England) Justin Rose	69	−1
T9	(United States) Vaughn Taylor	69	−1

=== Second round ===
Friday, July 1, 2016

Place	Player	Score	To par
1	(Australia) Jason Day	67-69=136	−4
2	(Sweden) David Lingmerth	70-67=137	−3
T3	(Argentina) Emiliano Grillo	67-71=138	−2
T3	(United States) William McGirt	64-74=138	−2
T3	(United States) Scott Piercy	69-69=138	−2
T6	(United States) Kevin Kisner	69-70=139	−1
T6	(Australia) Adam Scott	71-68=139	−1
T6	(United States) Jordan Spieth	68-71=139	−1
T6	(United States) Justin Thomas	70-69=139	−1
T10	(United States) Kevin Na	71-69=140	E
T10	(South Korea) Song Young-han	70-70=140	E
T10	(United States) Brian Stuard	71-69=140	E
T10	(United States) Jimmy Walker	67-73=140	E

=== Third round ===
Saturday, July 2, 2016

Place	Player	Score	To par
T1	(Australia) Jason Day	67-69-69=205	−5
T1	(United States) Scott Piercy	69-69-67=205	−5
3	(Sweden) David Lingmerth	70-67-69=206	−4
4	(United States) Brian Stuard	71-69-67=207	−3
T5	(United States) Dustin Johnson	69-73-66=208	−2
T5	(United States) William McGirt	64-74-70=208	−2
T5	(South Africa) Charl Schwartzel	72-69-67=208	−2
T8	(Argentina) Emiliano Grillo	67-71-71=209	−1
T8	(United States) Justin Thomas	70-69-70=209	−1
T10	(United States) Kevin Chappell	71-70-69=210	E
T10	(United States) Jordan Spieth	68-71-71=210	E

=== Final round ===
Sunday, July 3, 2016

Place	Player	Score	To par	Money ($)
1	(United States) Dustin Johnson	69-73-66-66=274	−6	1,620,000
2	(United States) Scott Piercy	69-69-67-70=275	−5	1,018,000
T3	(United States) Kevin Chappell	71-70-69-67=277	−3	449,250
T3	(Australia) Jason Day	67-69-69-72=277	−3	449,250
T3	(United States) Matt Kuchar	69-72-70-66=277	−3	449,250
T3	(United States) Jordan Spieth	68-71-71-67=277	−3	449,250
T7	(Sweden) David Lingmerth	70-67-69-72=278	−2	233,333
T7	(United States) William McGirt	64-74-70-70=278	−2	233,333
T7	(South Africa) Charl Schwartzel	72-69-67-70=278	−2	233,333
T10	(United States) Rickie Fowler	68-73-72-67=280	E	167,750
T10	(South Africa) Branden Grace	69-72-71-68=280	E	167,750
T10	(United States) Zach Johnson	72-74-69-65=280	E	167,750
T10	(Australia) Adam Scott	71-68-73-68=280	E	167,750

==== Scorecard ====
Final round

Hole	1	2	3	4	5	6	7	8	9	10	11	12	13	14	15	16	17	18
Par	4	5	4	4	3	4	3	4	4	4	4	3	4	4	3	5	4	4
(United States) Johnson	−2	−3	−2	−2	−3	−4	−4	−4	−4	−4	−4	−4	−5	−6	−6	−6	−7	−6
(United States) Piercy	−5	−5	−5	−5	−5	−5	−5	−6	−5	−6	−6	−5	−4	−5	−4	−4	−4	−5
(United States) Chappell	E	−2	−3	−3	−3	−3	−4	−5	−5	−5	−4	−4	−5	−4	−3	−3	−3	−3
(Australia) Day	−5	−7	−7	−7	−7	−7	−7	−7	−6	−7	−7	−7	−7	−7	−6	−4	−4	−3
(United States) Kuchar	+1	E	E	E	E	E	E	E	−1	−1	−1	−1	−1	−1	−1	−2	−2	−3
(United States) Spieth	E	E	+1	+1	+1	E	−1	−1	−1	−1	−2	−3	−3	−3	−3	−3	−3	−3
(Sweden) Lingmerth	−4	−4	−4	−4	−4	−5	−4	−4	−4	−4	−4	−4	−3	−3	−3	−2	−2	−2
(United States) McGirt	−2	−3	−3	−3	−3	−3	−3	−3	−3	−3	−3	−3	−3	−3	−3	−2	−2	−2
(South Africa) Schwartzel	−2	−2	−2	−1	−1	E	−1	−1	−1	−1	−2	−2	−2	−2	−2	−2	−2	−2

Cumulative tournament scores, relative to par

Eagle	Birdie	Bogey	Double bogey
