= 2015 WGC-Cadillac Championship =

Golf tournament

Coordinates: 25.815°N 80.340°W

Tournament information
- Dates: March 5–8, 2015
- Location: Doral, Florida, U.S.
- Course(s): Trump National Doral; Blue Monster Course
- Tour(s): PGA Tour; European Tour

Statistics
- Par: 72
- Length: 7,528 yards (6,884 m)
- Field: 74 players
- Cut: None
- Prize fund: $9,250,000 €8,277,405
- Winner's share: $1,570,000 €1,404,922

Champion
- (United States) Dustin Johnson
- 279 (−9)

Location in the United States

The 2015 WGC-Cadillac Championship was a golf tournament played March 5–8 on the TPC Blue Monster course at Trump National Doral in Doral, Florida, a suburb west of Miami. It was the 16th WGC-Cadillac Championship tournament, and the first of the World Golf Championships events to be staged in 2015. The tournament was won by Dustin Johnson.

== Course layout ==
The tournament was played on the TPC Blue Monster course.

Hole	1	2	3	4	5	6	7	8	9	Out	10	11	12	13	14	15	16	17	18	In	Total
Yards	590	448	436	227	421	432	471	549	200	3,774	614	422	601	238	484	153	341	425	476	3,754	7,528
Par	5	4	4	3	4	4	4	5	3	36	5	4	5	3	4	3	4	4	4	36	72

== Field ==
The field consisted of players from the top of the Official World Golf Ranking and the money lists/Orders of Merit from the six main professional golf tours. Seven players were appearing in their first WGC event: Morgan Hoffmann, Steven Jeffress, Brooks Koepka, Gary Stal, Robert Streb, Cameron Tringale and Daniel van Tonder. A further eleven were playing in their first Cadillac Championship: Tommy Fleetwood, Mikko Ilonen, Anirban Lahiri, Alexander Lévy, David Lipsky, Shane Lowry, Koumei Oda, Brendon Todd, Marc Warren, Bernd Wiesberger, and Danny Willett. Each player is classified according to the first category in which he qualified, but other categories are shown in parentheses.

1. The top 30 players from the final 2014 FedExCup Points List

Jason Day (7,9,10), Rickie Fowler (7,9), Jim Furyk (7,9), Sergio García (2,7,9), Bill Haas (7,9), Russell Henley, Morgan Hoffmann, Billy Horschel (7,9), Dustin Johnson (7,9), Zach Johnson (7,9), Martin Kaymer (2,7,9), Chris Kirk (7,9), Matt Kuchar (7,9), Hunter Mahan (7,9), Hideki Matsuyama (7,9), Rory McIlroy (2,7,8,9), Kevin Na (7,9), Geoff Ogilvy, Ryan Palmer (7,9), Patrick Reed (7,9,10), Justin Rose (2,7,9), Adam Scott (7,9), John Senden, Webb Simpson (7,9), Jordan Spieth (7,9), Brendon Todd (7), Cameron Tringale, Jimmy Walker (7,9,10), Bubba Watson (7,9,10), Gary Woodland (7,9)

2. The top 20 players from the final 2014 European Tour Race to Dubai

Thomas Bjørn (7,9), Jamie Donaldson (7,9), Victor Dubuisson (7,9), Ross Fisher (8), Tommy Fleetwood, Stephen Gallacher (7,9), Mikko Ilonen, Brooks Koepka (7,9,10), Alexander Lévy, Shane Lowry (7,9), Joost Luiten (7,9), Graeme McDowell (7,9), Louis Oosthuizen (7,9), Ian Poulter (7,9), Marcel Siem, Henrik Stenson (7,9)

3. The top 2 players from the final 2014 Japan Golf Tour Order of Merit

Hiroyuki Fujita, Koumei Oda

4. The top 2 players from the final 2014 PGA Tour of Australasia Order of Merit

Greg Chalmers, Steven Jeffress

5. The top 2 players from the final 2014 Sunshine Tour Order of Merit

Thomas Aiken, Daniel van Tonder

6. The top 2 players from the final 2014 Asian Tour Order of Merit

Anirban Lahiri (7,8,9), David Lipsky

7. The top 50 players from the Official World Golf Ranking, as of February 23, 2015

Keegan Bradley (9), Luke Donald (9), Jason Dufner (9), Branden Grace (8,9), J. B. Holmes (9), Thongchai Jaidee (8,9), Phil Mickelson (9), Ryan Moore (9), Charl Schwartzel (9), Brandt Snedeker (9,10), Lee Westwood (9), Bernd Wiesberger (8,9), Danny Willett (8,9)

8. The top 10 players from the 2015 European Tour Race to Dubai, as of February 23, 2015

Alex Norén, Gary Stal, Marc Warren

9. The top 50 players from the Official World Golf Ranking, as of March 2, 2015

Paul Casey

10. The top 10 players from the 2015 FedExCup Points List, as of March 2, 2015

Bae Sang-moon, Charley Hoffman, Robert Streb

- James Hahn did not play due to the birth of his first child.

== Round summaries ==
=== First round ===
Thursday, March 5, 2015

J. B. Holmes shot a 10-under-par 62 (one off the course record) to take a four-stroke lead over Ryan Moore.

Place	Player	Score	To par
1	(United States) J. B. Holmes	62	−10
2	(United States) Ryan Moore	66	−6
T3	(United States) Rickie Fowler	68	−4
T3	(United States) Dustin Johnson	68	−4
T3	(France) Alexander Lévy	68	−4
T6	(United States) Brooks Koepka	69	−3
T6	(Sweden) Henrik Stenson	69	−3
T8	(Wales) Jamie Donaldson	70	−2
T8	(United States) Jim Furyk	70	−2
T8	(United States) Charley Hoffman	70	−2
T8	(Australia) Adam Scott	70	−2
T8	(United States) Gary Woodland	70	−2

=== Second round ===
Friday, March 6, 2015

J. B. Holmes shot a one-over-par 73, 11 strokes worse than his first round, but maintained a lead over Ryan Moore. Adam Scott shot the low round of the day, a 4-under-par 68.

Place	Player	Score	To par
1	(United States) J. B. Holmes	62-73=135	−9
2	(United States) Ryan Moore	66-71=137	−7
3	(Australia) Adam Scott	70-68=138	−6
T4	(Sweden) Henrik Stenson	69-71=140	−4
T4	(United States) Bubba Watson	71-69=140	−4
T6	(United States) Dustin Johnson	68-73=141	−3
T6	(France) Alexander Lévy	68-73=141	−3
T6	(United States) Ryan Palmer	71-70=141	−3
T9	(Wales) Jamie Donaldson	70-72=142	−2
T9	(Spain) Sergio García	73-69=142	−2

=== Third round ===
Saturday, March 7, 2015

J. B. Holmes birdied four straight holes on the back-9 to take a 5-shot lead after 54 holes. Both Holmes and Dustin Johnson recorded a hole-in-one on the par-3 4th within a span of 20 minutes. Bill Haas shot the low round of the day, a seven-under-par 65.

Place	Player	Score	To par
1	(United States) J. B. Holmes	62-73-70=205	−11
T2	(United States) Dustin Johnson	68-73-69=210	−6
T2	(United States) Bubba Watson	71-69-70=210	−6
4	(United States) Ryan Moore	66-71-74=211	−5
T5	(United States) Bill Haas	74-73-65=212	−4
T5	(South Africa) Louis Oosthuizen	71-74-67=212	−4
T5	(Sweden) Henrik Stenson	69-71-72=212	−4
T8	(Spain) Sergio García	73-69-71=213	−3
T8	(Australia) Adam Scott	70-68-75=213	−3
T8	(United States) Webb Simpson	74-69-70=213	−3
T8	(England) Lee Westwood	71-72-70=213	−3

=== Final round ===
Sunday, March 8, 2015

Dustin Johnson shot a 3-under-par 69 to overcome a 5-shot deficit and win by one stroke over J. B. Holmes. It was his first win since his six-month leave from the game. Holmes shot a 3-over-par 75.

Place	Player	Score	To par	Money ($)
1	(United States) Dustin Johnson	68-73-69-69=279	−9	1,570,000
2	(United States) J. B. Holmes	62-73-70-75=280	−8	930,000
3	(United States) Bubba Watson	71-69-70-71=281	−7	540,000
T4	(Australia) Adam Scott	70-68-75-71=284	−4	365,000
T4	(Sweden) Henrik Stenson	69-71-72-72=284	−4	365,000
6	(South Africa) Louis Oosthuizen	71-74-67-73=285	−3	270,000
T7	(United States) Bill Haas	74-73-65-74=286	−2	215,000
T7	(United States) Webb Simpson	74-69-70-73=286	−2	215,000
T9	(Northern Ireland) Rory McIlroy	73-70-72-72=287	−1	163,333
T9	(United States) Ryan Moore	66-71-74-76=287	−1	163,333
T9	(United States) Kevin Na	74-71-71-71=287	−1	163,333

==== Scorecard ====
Hole	1	2	3	4	5	6	7	8	9	10	11	12	13	14	15	16	17	18
Par	5	4	4	3	4	4	4	5	3	5	4	5	3	4	3	4	4	4
(United States) Johnson	−6	−6	−6	−7	−7	−7	−6	−7	−7	−8	−8	−8	−8	−8	−9	−9	−9	−9
(United States) Holmes	−11	−11	−10	−10	−9	−8	−8	−8	−8	−8	−8	−8	−8	−7	−7	−8	−8	−8
(United States) Watson	−7	−7	−8	−9	−9	−9	−10	−10	−10	−10	−9	−8	−8	−7	−7	−7	−7	−7
