= Dustin Johnson =

American professional golfer (born 1984)

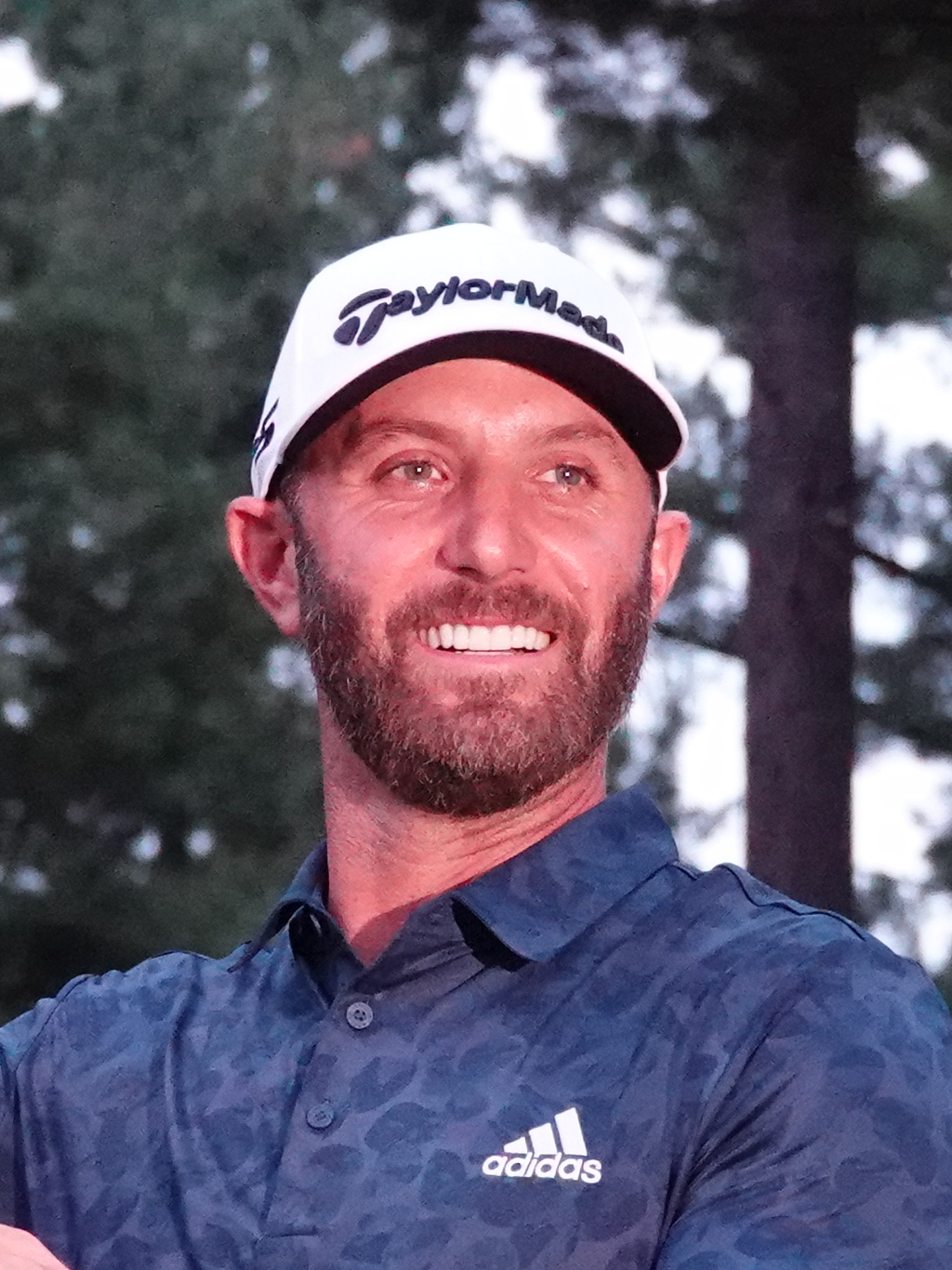
- Johnson at the 2022 LIV Golf Invitational Boston

Personal information
- Full name: Dustin Hunter Johnson
- Nickname: DJ
- Nationality: United States
- Born: June 22, 1984 (age 42) Columbia, South Carolina, U.S.
- Height: 6 ft 4 in (1.93 m)
- Weight: 190 lb (86 kg; 14 st)
- Spouse: Paulina Gretzky (m. 2022)
- Children: 2

Career
- Sport: Golf
- College: Coastal Carolina University
- Turned professional: 2007
- Current tour: LIV Golf
- Former tour: PGA Tour
- Professional wins: 30
- Highest ranking: 1 (February 19, 2017) (135 weeks)

Number of wins by tour
- PGA Tour: 24
- European Tour: 9
- LIV Golf: 3
- Other: 1

Best results in major championships (wins: 2)
- Masters Tournament: Won: 2020
- PGA Championship: 2nd/T2: 2019, 2020
- U.S. Open: Won: 2016
- The Open Championship: T2: 2011

Achievements and awards
- PGA Tour money list winner: 2015–16
- PGA Tour Player of the Year: 2015–16, 2019–20
- PGA Player of the Year: 2016
- Byron Nelson Award: 2015–16, 2017–18
- Vardon Trophy: 2016, 2018
- PGA Tour FedEx Cup winner: 2020
- LIV Golf Invitational Series individual points list winner: 2022
- LIV Golf Invitational Series money list winner: 2022

Dustin Hunter Johnson (born June 22, 1984) is an American professional golfer. He has won two major championships, the 2016 U.S. Open at Oakmont Country Club with a 4-under-par score of 276 and the 2020 Masters Tournament with a record score of 268, 20-under-par. He had previously finished in a tie for second at both the 2011 Open Championship and the 2015 U.S. Open. He has six World Golf Championships victories, second only to Tiger Woods's 18 wins, and was the first and only player to win each of the four World Golf Championship events. He played in The LIV Golf League from its inception in 2022 to its demise in 2026.

Johnson was a member of the PGA Tour until June 2022, when he resigned to join LIV Golf. By virtue of his 2020 Masters win in the 2020–21 season, Johnson became the third player in PGA Tour history to win a Tour title in each of his first 14 seasons, joining Jack Nicklaus (17) and Tiger Woods (14). Johnson was one of the longest drivers on the PGA Tour, having been ranked in the top 10 annually in driving distance from 2008 to 2020, and leading in 2015.

On February 19, 2017 Johnson became the 20th world number one ranked golfer and remained there for 64 consecutive weeks, the 6th longest streak at No. 1. He returned to the number 1 position in 2018, 2019, 2020, and 2021 and has been at number 1 for a total of 135 weeks, 4th most and Johnson is one of only 5 men with more than 100 weeks atop the rankings.

== Early life and amateur career ==
Dustin Hunter Johnson was born on June 22, 1984, in Columbia, South Carolina, and played collegiate golf at Coastal Carolina University where he majored in Sports Management. As an amateur, he won the Monroe Invitational and the Northeast Amateur in 2007 and played on the winning 2007 Walker Cup and Palmer Cup teams.

== Professional career ==
=== 2007–2009 ===
Johnson turned professional in late 2007 and earned his 2008 PGA Tour card by finishing in a tie for 14th place at the 2007 qualifying school in December.

Toward the end of his rookie season in October 2008, Johnson won his first PGA Tour event, the Turning Stone Resort Championship in upstate New York. Four months later, he won his second event at the AT&T Pebble Beach National Pro-Am, which was shortened to 54 holes when the final round was canceled due to strong winds and heavy rain. Johnson won by four strokes over Mike Weir and by five strokes over second-round leader Retief Goosen, who shot a third-round 74. In the 2009 Masters Tournament Johnson became only the second person in Masters Tournament history to eagle consecutive holes. He made an eagle putt on the 13th hole and then holed out from 173 yards on the 14th hole during the final round to accomplish the feat. Johnson finished the 2009 season ranked 15th on the PGA Tour money list.

=== 2010 ===
In February 2010, Johnson birdied the final hole to defeat former world number one David Duval and two-time PGA Tour winner J. B. Holmes to successfully defend his AT&T Pebble Beach National Pro-Am title.

He continued his Pebble Beach success by shooting 71-70-66 to take a three-shot lead over Graeme McDowell at the 2010 U.S. Open. In the last pairing on Sunday, Johnson had trouble early and never recovered; he shot an 82 and finished tied for eighth (McDowell won the championship).

In the final round of the 2010 PGA Championship, Johnson held a one-shot lead entering the final hole. He appeared to have bogeyed the hole, which would have tied him for first and entered him into a three-hole playoff with Bubba Watson and Martin Kaymer. However, he received a two-stroke penalty for grounding his club in a bunker, thereby dropping him to a tie for fifth place. Kaymer eventually won the playoff.

Johnson broke his streak of bad luck at the third FedEx Cup playoff event of the season, the BMW Championship at Cog Hill in September. It was Johnson's fourth career PGA Tour victory, and his first in any FedEx Cup playoff event. He finished the 2010 season ranked 4th on the PGA Tour money list.

=== 2011 ===
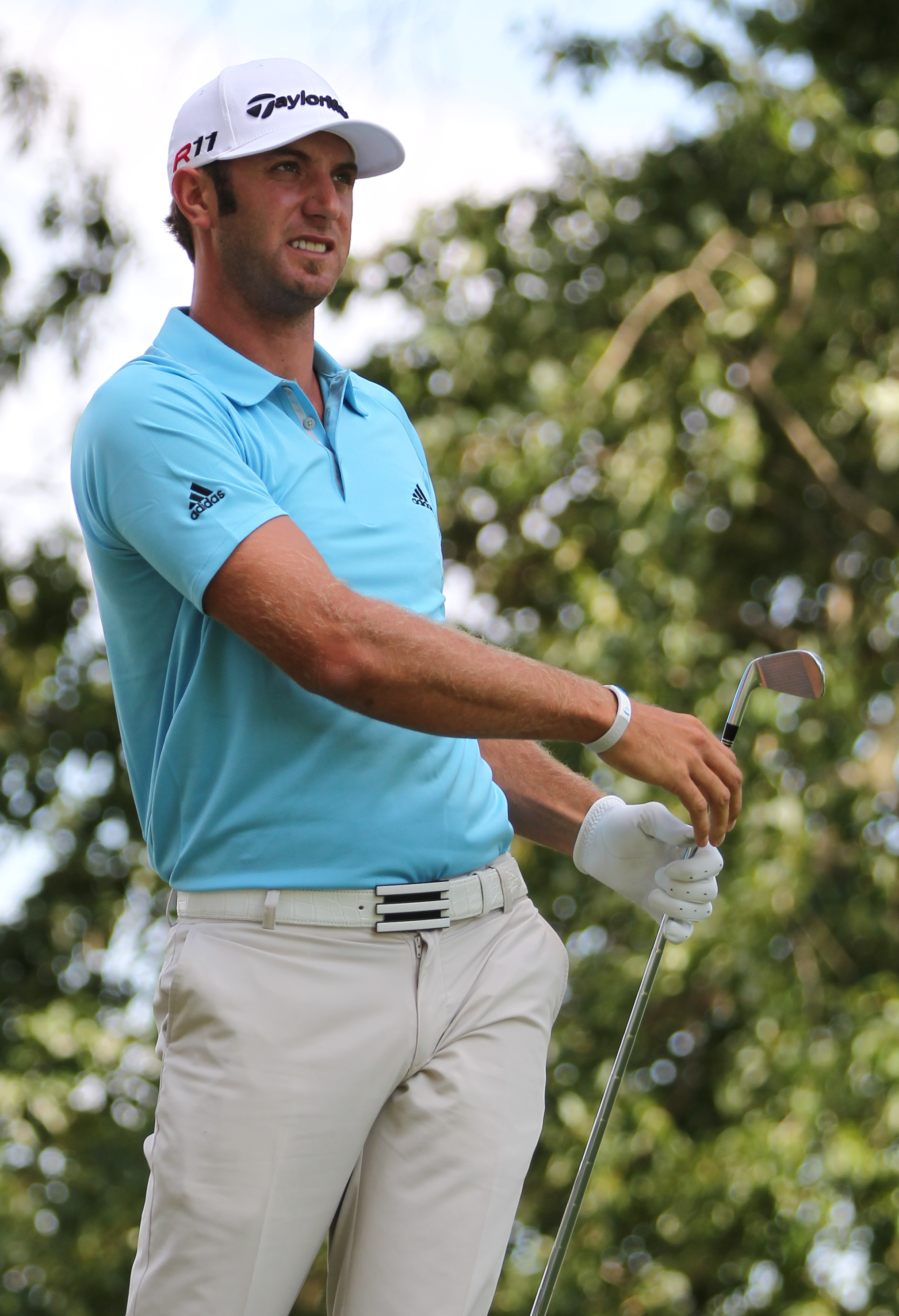
Johnson at the 2011 U.S. Open

Johnson took part in the Long Drive Contest for charity at the Hyundai Tournament of Champions in January, alongside Bubba Watson and Robert Garrigus.

In March 2011, Johnson entered the final round of the WGC-Cadillac Championship with a two stroke lead over the rest of the field. However he could only manage a final round one-under-par 71 to finish as runner-up behind Nick Watney.

Johnson earned his then-best finish in a major championship in July at the 2011 Open Championship in England. He finished in a tie for second place at Royal St George's, alongside fellow American Phil Mickelson, three strokes behind champion Darren Clarke. Johnson's first three rounds of 70-68-68 left him one stroke behind Clarke going into Sunday's play. One highlight of Johnson's week at Royal St George's came in the first round when he recorded a hole in one on the par three 16th hole. This result marked the third time that Johnson had been part of the final group on Sunday at a major championship and also occurring in three out of the four majors, the 2010 U.S. Open, the 2010 PGA Championship and the 2011 Open Championship. As a result of this second-place finish, Johnson moved to his highest spot in the Official World Golf Ranking at the time, seventh, and became the third-ranked American behind Steve Stricker and Mickelson.

Johnson won his fifth PGA Tour title at The Barclays in 2011, beating Matt Kuchar by two strokes, in the first event in the FedEx Cup playoff. It was his second 54-hole tournament victory of his career, after the 2009 AT&T Pebble Beach National Pro-Am; the tournament was shortened due to the threat of Hurricane Irene. Johnson shot rounds of 66-63-65 to win at -19. It was also the second FedEx Cup playoff event win of his career; the first was the BMW Championship in 2010. The win also took him to a career high of 4th in the world rankings, the second highest American (behind Steve Stricker). Johnson did not record a single top-20 in the remaining three FedEx Cub playoff events, and finished fourth in the final standings.

=== 2012–2013 ===
Johnson incurred a back injury at home in March and missed over two months of the 2012 season, including the first major at The Masters. He returned to competition in late May at the Memorial Tournament in Ohio, made the cut and finished tied for 19th. The following week he won his sixth tour event, the FedEx St. Jude Classic in Memphis, Tennessee at TPC Southwind. He missed the cut at the U.S.Open the week after, finishing at +9, one stroke outside the cut mark.

Johnson began his 2013 season with a win at the season opening Hyundai Tournament of Champions, an event reserved for winners from the past season. Johnson won by four strokes over defending champion Steve Stricker in an event that was shortened to 54 holes due to the bad weather, mainly very strong wind that meant conditions were unplayable. The first three days of the tournament were wiped out, with the field having to complete 36 holes on the Monday and a final 18 on Tuesday. The event was Johnson's seventh PGA Tour win and his third in a 54-hole event. In November, Johnson won the WGC-HSBC Champions, part of the 2013–14 PGA Tour season. He was the first player since Tiger Woods to win at least once in each of his first seven seasons coming out of college.

=== 2014 ===
On July 31, 2014, Johnson announced he was taking the rest of the season off to seek professional help for "personal challenges". On August 1, conflicting reports surfaced regarding the circumstances of Johnson's announcement from the previous day. Golf Magazine reported that Johnson had been suspended from the PGA Tour for six months after testing positive for cocaine. The magazine said that this was his third positive drug test, after a 2009 positive for marijuana and 2012 positive for cocaine. However, PGA Tour officials said that Johnson was taking a voluntary leave and was not under suspension.

=== 2015 ===
Johnson returned to the tour at the Farmers Insurance Open in February. He missed the cut by one stroke. In the next two events he played, he recorded two top-five finishes: tied for fourth at the AT&T Pebble Beach National Pro-Am; and tied for second at the Northern Trust Open after losing on the third playoff hole to James Hahn. Johnson missed a 12 footer for birdie on the third extra hole to extend the playoff. Those results led Johnson back inside the top-15 in the World Ranking. After another missed cut at The Honda Classic, Johnson beat J. B. Holmes by one stroke to win the WGC-Cadillac Championship at Trump National Doral in Miami, Florida. The win earned Johnson $1,570,000, moving him to 7th in the world rankings.

At the 2015 U.S. Open, Johnson held a share of the lead heading into the final round. He had two birdies on the front-nine but had three bogeys on the back-nine but birdied 17 to get within one of Jordan Spieth. Johnson hit a five iron to the par-5 18th, 12 feet from the hole. He hit his eagle putt to within 3 feet past the hole and then missed the three footer coming back to give the title to Spieth.

Johnson led the 2015 Open Championship at The Old Course after 36 holes, but shot two rounds of 75 on the weekend to fall out of contention. Zach Johnson went on to win the event in a playoff.

=== 2016 ===
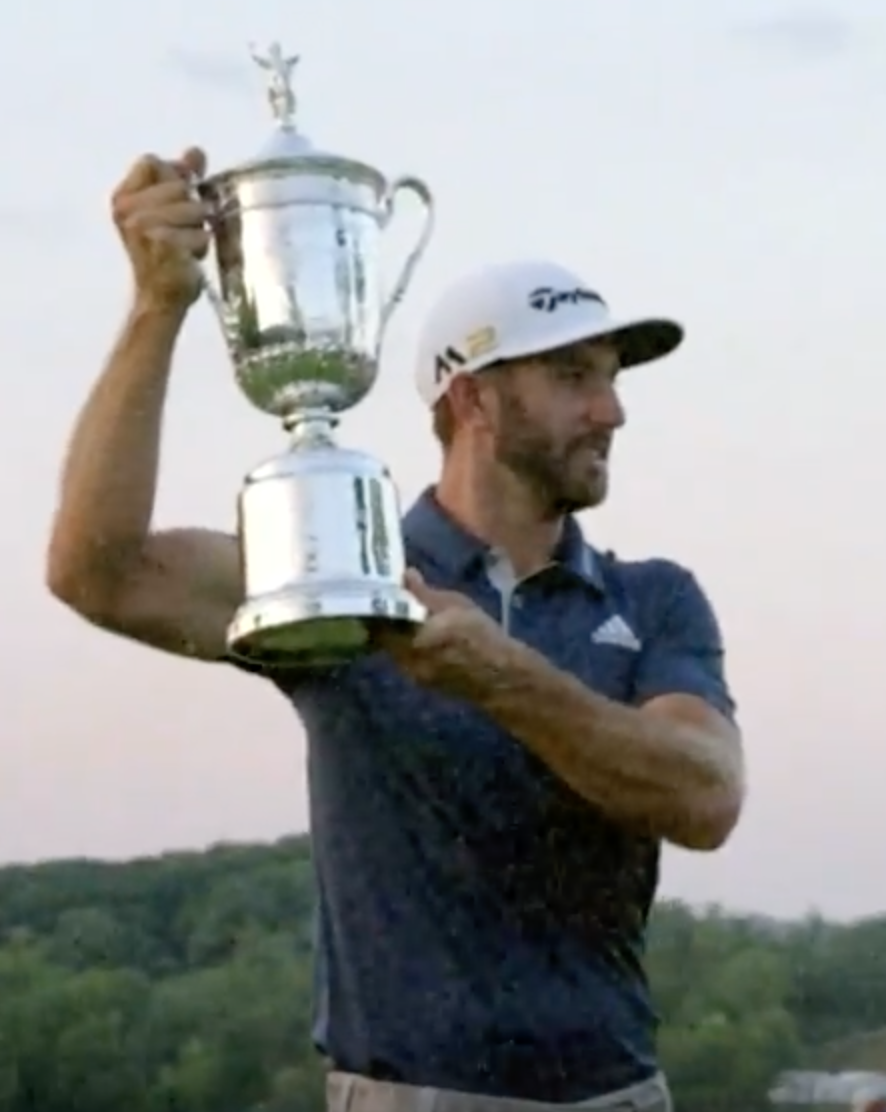
Johnson after winning the 2016 U.S. Open

Johnson started off the 2016 season well with six top-10 finishes in his first ten events. After two finishes outside the top 10, he came close to winning the Memorial Tournament, finishing one shot behind eventual winner William McGirt. He recorded another top-10 finish in the FedEx St. Jude Classic a week later. Johnson won the 2016 U.S. Open to claim his first major title on June 19, 2016, in his 29th major appearance. The win was shrouded in controversy however as Johnson was given a one-shot penalty after his final round had finished due to an incident on the fifth green. As he prepared to address the ball for a par putt, his ball moved slightly. Johnson stepped away saying that he had not addressed the ball. After he spoke to an on-site rules official he was told to carry on with his shot which he successfully putted. He ended up winning by three strokes ahead of Shane Lowry, Scott Piercy and Jim Furyk. The moving ball incident sparked outrage among many of the world's top golfers with players such as Jordan Spieth, Rory McIlroy, Rickie Fowler and Webb Simpson taking to social media to criticize the USGA for its decision. Johnson moved up three positions in the OWGR to number three after this win.

On July 9, 2016, Johnson confirmed that he would not be participating in the 2016 Summer Olympics, because of concerns over the Zika virus. Johnson won his third tournament of the year, the BMW Championship, on September 11, 2016.

Johnson finished the season as the leading money winner on the PGA Tour, winning the Arnold Palmer Award, had the lowest scoring average (winning the Vardon Trophy and Byron Nelson Award) and won both the PGA Player of the Year and PGA Tour Player of the Year awards.

=== 2017 ===
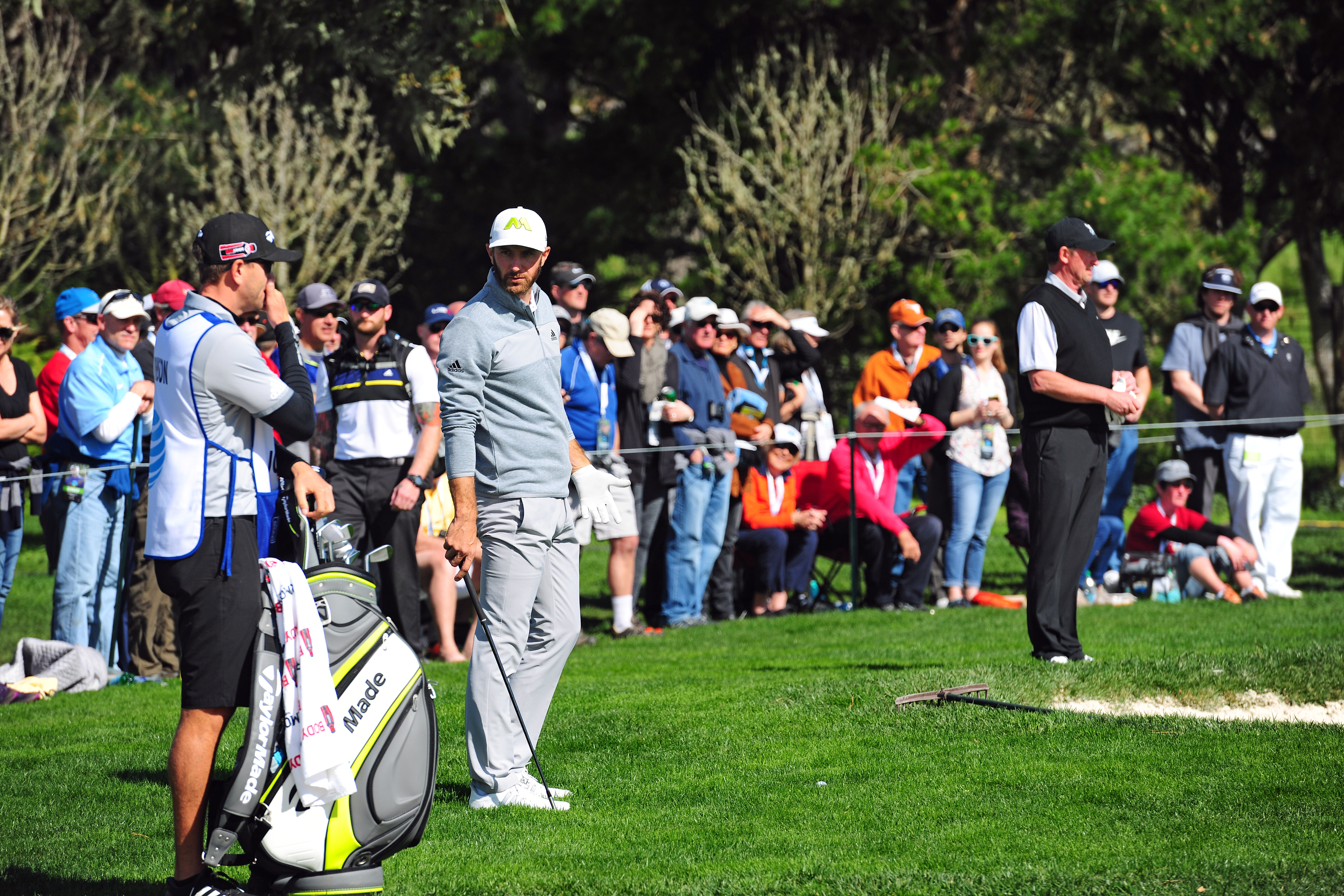
Johnson at the 2017 AT&T Pebble Beach Pro-Am, his father-in-law Wayne Gretzky can be seen in the background to the right.

After starting the season with two top-10 finishes in his first four events, Johnson won the Genesis Open in February by five strokes over Scott Brown and Thomas Pieters. The win moved him to number one in the Official World Golf Ranking. Johnson's win at the Genesis Open also cemented a place in history as he joined Tiger Woods and Jack Nicklaus as the only golfers in PGA Tour history to win a title in each of their first 10 seasons.

In March, Johnson won at the WGC-Mexico Championship by one stroke over Tommy Fleetwood. The win marked the fifth time that a golfer won his first tournament after becoming number one. This was Johnson's fourth WGC title and moved him into second place on the list of most World Golf Championships titles, trailing only Tiger Woods. Three weeks later Johnson went undefeated at the WGC-Dell Technologies Match Play event for his first WGC Match Play title and his fifth overall WGC title. The win also meant that Johnson became the first player to win all four of the WGC crowns, the 2013 WGC-HSBC Champions, the 2015 WGC-Cadillac Championship and 2017 WGC-Mexico Championship (previously the Cadillac Championship), the 2016 WGC-Bridgestone Invitational, and the 2017 WGC-Dell Technologies Match Play. This was his third consecutive Tour title through just seven starts in 2017.

Prior to the 2017 Masters Tournament, Johnson fell down a staircase in the Augusta home he was renting and suffered a back injury. He withdrew from the event.

In August, Johnson won the first FedEx Cup playoff event, The Northern Trust, his 16th Tour title and his tour-leading fourth title of the season. This was the first time that he had won more than three Tour titles in the same season. By winning, he also moved up three spots to No. 1 on the official money list with $8,392,068 and also moved up to No. 6 on the career money list.

=== 2018 ===
In January 2018, Johnson won the Sentry Tournament of Champions for the second time, with an eight-stroke victory over Jon Rahm. He began the final round with a two-stroke advantage, but pulled clear of the field with a 65 in the final round for a 24-under-par winning score. Johnson fell one shot short of David Duval's record nine-stroke win at the event in 1999. The win meant that Johnson had won a title in his first 11 straight seasons on the PGA Tour, behind only Tiger Woods (14) and Jack Nicklaus (17). In winning, he also became only the third player in the last 30 years – alongside Woods and Phil Mickelson – to reach 17 PGA Tour wins before the age of 34. In June, Johnson won the FedEx St. Jude Classic in Memphis by five strokes, the second time he won the event. The win helped him regain the Number 1 world ranking.

In June 2018, Johnson opened up the U.S. Open at Shinnecock Hills with rounds of 69-67 for a 4-under-par total to hold the 36-hole lead by four strokes, the only player under par at the halfway stage. He then shot a 77 during a tough third round, which dropped him back into a four-way tie for lead heading into the final round. He shot even par in the final round and finished in third place.

In July 2018, Johnson captured his third victory of the season when he won the RBC Canadian Open by three strokes over An Byeong-hun and Kim Meen-whee, after starting the final round in a four-way tie for the lead.

In September 2018, Johnson qualified for the U.S. team participating in the 2018 Ryder Cup. The U.S. team lost the Ryder Cup to the European team by a score of 17 1/2 to 10 1/2 at Le Golf National outside of Paris, France. Johnson went 1−4−0 and lost his singles match to Ian Poulter (2 up). It was alleged that Johnson and Brooks Koepka had to be separated after a disagreement on the evening of September 30, 2018 in the aftermath of the U.S. losing the Ryder Cup.

=== 2019 ===
In February 2019, Johnson won the inaugural Saudi International on the European Tour by two strokes from China's Li Haotong. After entering the final round tied with Li, Johnson shot a final round 67, which included four birdies on the back nine to pull clear. The win was Johnson's sixth European Tour title, but first regular tour event, outside of the majors and WGC's. This made him the USA's fifth most successful player in European Tour history behind Tiger Woods, Phil Mickelson, Jack Nicklaus, and Tom Watson. Later that month, Johnson won the WGC-Mexico Championship for the third time (second time in Mexico), and his sixth World Golf Championship overall. It was his 20th career PGA Tour win, which will earn him a lifetime exemption once he has completed 15 years of membership.

In April 2019, Johnson finished tied for second in the Masters Tournament, one stroke behind Tiger Woods. The next month, Johnson finished second at the PGA Championship, two strokes back behind Brooks Koepka. This made him the eighth person to have finished runner up in all four majors.

In December 2019, Johnson played on the U.S. team at the 2019 Presidents Cup at Royal Melbourne Golf Club in Australia. The U.S. team won 16–14. Johnson went 2–2–0 including a win in his Sunday singles match against Li Haotong.

=== 2020 ===
On March 2, Johnson's agent announced that Johnson would not be competing in the 2020 Summer Olympics due to his schedule.

On June 27, Johnson carded his career lowest round on the PGA Tour during the third round of the Travelers Championship. His nine-under par round of 61 put him within two strokes of the lead, held by Brendon Todd, entering the final round. Johnson won the tournament with a score of 19 under par.

In August, Johnson held the 54-hole lead at the 2020 PGA Championship before finishing in a tie for second place, two strokes behind winner Collin Morikawa. Two weeks later, Johnson won The Northern Trust at TPC Boston, Massachusetts by eleven strokes with a score of 30 under par, during which he set a new career low round with an 11-under-par 60 in the second round. The win, at the first tournament of the 2020 FedEx Cup Playoffs, moved him into first place in the season long points standings. He also returned to number one in the Official World Golf Ranking.

On September 7, Johnson won the Tour Championship at East Lake Golf Club in Atlanta, Georgia and the $15 million FedEx Cup. He was subsequently voted the 2020 PGA Tour Player of the Year for the second time in his career.

On November 15, Johnson won the Masters Tournament by five strokes with a record 20 under par total of 268, two strokes better than the previous record jointly held by Tiger Woods (in 1997) and Jordan Spieth (in 2015). It was his second major championship victory and first in the Masters. It was also his 24th official win on the PGA Tour, and extended his streak of winning at least one tournament every season to 14.

=== 2021 ===
On February 7, Johnson won the Saudi International for the second time; it was his 9th victory on the European Tour.

In September 2021, Johnson played on the U.S. team in the 2021 Ryder Cup at Whistling Straits in Kohler, Wisconsin. The U.S. team won 19–9. Johnson went 5–0–0 including a win in his Sunday singles match against Paul Casey. Johnson also won the inaugural Nicklaus-Jacklin Award for the American team. It is an award given to the player whose teamwork, sportsmanship, performance and decisions epitomized the spirit of the Ryder Cup.

=== 2022 ===
Johnson started 2022 with a T25 at the Farmers Insurance Open. After missing the cut at the Genesis Invitational, he tied for ninth at The Players Championship. He finished in fourth place at the 2022 WGC-Dell Technologies Match Play, and T12 at the 2022 Masters Tournament. After a missed cut at the RBC Heritage, and a T59 at the AT&T Byron Nelson, Johnson missed the cut at the 2022 PGA Championship.

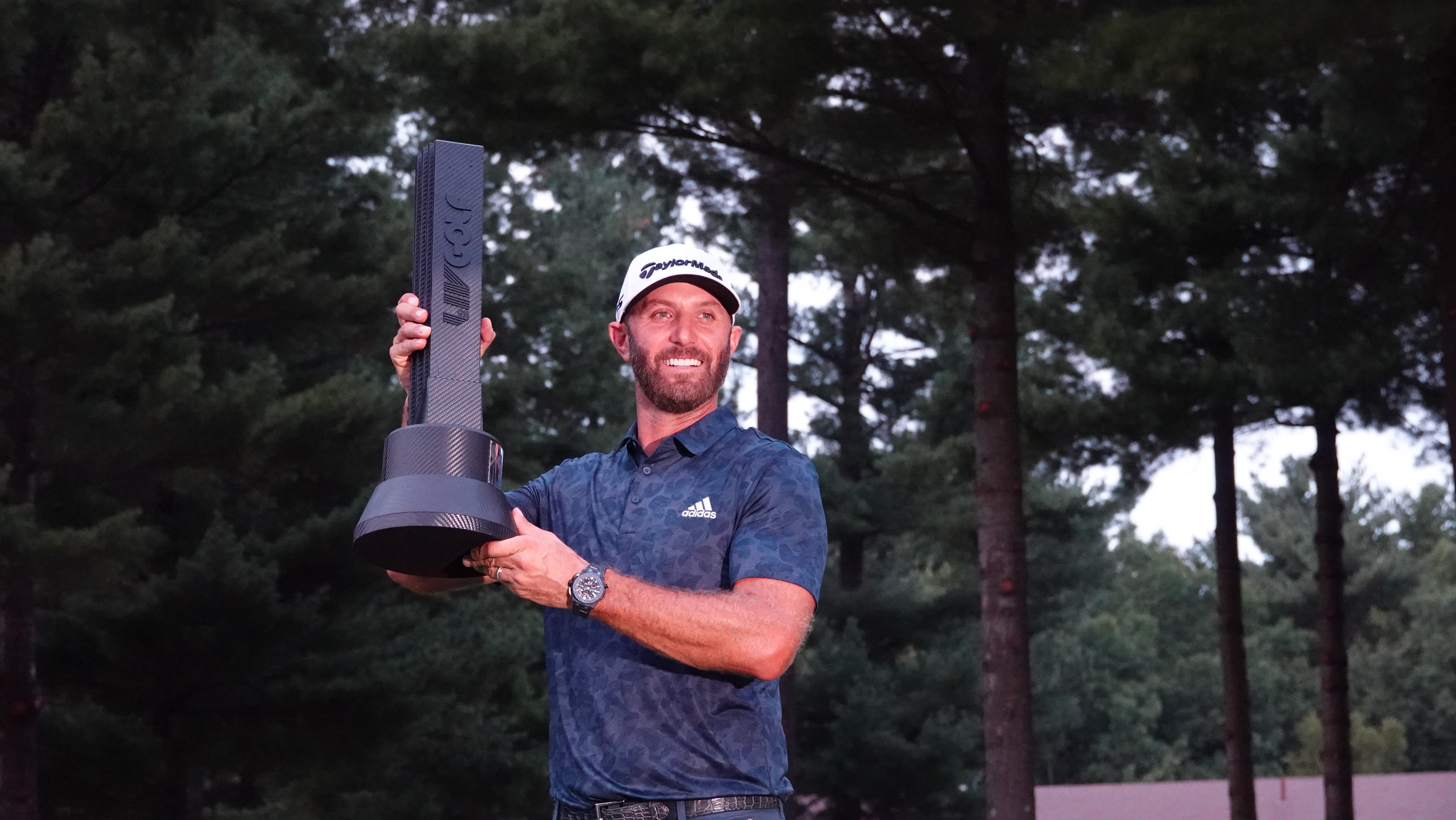
Dustin Johnson hoists the championship trophy following his victory in the LIV Golf Invitational Boston at The International Golf Club in Bolton, MA.

On May 31, it was announced that Johnson would be part of the field for the inaugural event on the LIV Golf Invitational Series from June 9–11, sponsored by the Saudi Arabian Public Investment Fund. After this announcement, RBC decided to end their sponsorship of Johnson. The day after the announcement of the field, PGA Tour commissioner Jay Monahan stated that golfers would have to choose between the LIV Golf Series and the PGA Tour. Johnson announced his resignation from the PGA Tour on June 7. The PGA Tour announced in June 2022 that all players participating in LIV Golf, including Johnson, would be ineligible to participate in tour events or the Presidents Cup.

On the inaugural season of the LIV Golf Tour, Johnson competed for 4 Aces GC, which won the team competition in four consecutive tournaments – Portland, Bedminster, Boston and Chicago. Johnson won the LIV Golf Invitational Boston on September 5, 2022, at The International Golf Club in Bolton, Massachusetts following a 3-player playoff hole, scoring an eagle on the par-5 18th hole to defeat Anirban Lahiri and Joaquín Niemann.

=== 2023–present ===
Johnson has remained on the LIV Golf Tour and secured victories at LIV Tulsa in 2023 and LIV Las Vegas in 2024. In January 2026, Johnson signed a multiyear extension with LIV Golf. The news came within days of Brooks Koepka announcing his return to the PGA Tour from LIV Golf. At the time of the extension, Johnson had fallen to 636th in the world because he's not receiving world-ranking points for his LIV Golf finishes.

== Personal life ==
In August 2013, Johnson became engaged to model, singer, and celebutante Paulina Gretzky, the daughter of Canadian ice hockey player Wayne Gretzky and Janet Jones. Johnson met Gretzky in 2009, but they did not officially start dating until early 2013. Seven months later, the pair got engaged. The couple married on April 23, 2022, at Blackberry Farm in Tennessee. They have two sons.

Johnson appeared in the sports documentary series Full Swing, which premiered on Netflix on February 15, 2023. He has also established a non-profit organization, Dustin Johnson Foundation, which helps youth learn, play, and contend.

== Amateur wins ==
- 2007 Monroe Invitational, Northeast Amateur

== Professional wins (30) ==
=== PGA Tour wins (24) ===
Legend
Major championships (2)
World Golf Championships (6)
FedEx Cup playoff events (6)
Other PGA Tour (10)

| No. | Date | Tournament | Winning score | To par | Margin of victory | Runner(s)-up |
|---|---|---|---|---|---|---|
| 1 | Oct 5, 2008 | Turning Stone Resort Championship | 72-68-70-69=279 | −9 | 1 stroke | (Australia) Robert Allenby |
| 2 | Feb 15, 2009 | AT&T Pebble Beach National Pro-Am | 65-69-67=201 (Note: Shortened to 54 holes due to weather.) | −15 | 4 strokes | (Canada) Mike Weir |
| 3 | Feb 14, 2010 | AT&T Pebble Beach National Pro-Am (2) | 64-68-64-74=270 | −16 | 1 stroke | (United States) David Duval, (United States) J. B. Holmes |
| 4 | Sep 12, 2010 | BMW Championship | 68-70-68-69=275 | −9 | 1 stroke | (England) Paul Casey |
| 5 | Aug 27, 2011 | The Barclays | 66-63-65=194 | −19 | 2 strokes | (United States) Matt Kuchar |
| 6 | Jun 10, 2012 | FedEx St. Jude Classic | 70-68-67-66=271 | −9 | 1 stroke | (United States) John Merrick |
| 7 | Jan 8, 2013 | Hyundai Tournament of Champions | 69-66-68=203 | −16 | 4 strokes | (United States) Steve Stricker |
| 8 | Nov 3, 2013 | WGC-HSBC Champions | 69-63-66-66=264 | −24 | 3 strokes | (England) Ian Poulter |
| 9 | Mar 8, 2015 | WGC-Cadillac Championship | 68-73-69-69=279 | −9 | 1 stroke | (United States) J. B. Holmes |
| 10 | Jun 19, 2016 | U.S. Open | 67-69-71-69=276 | −4 | 3 strokes | (United States) Jim Furyk, (Republic of Ireland) Shane Lowry, (United States) Scott Piercy |
| 11 | Jul 3, 2016 | WGC-Bridgestone Invitational (Note: The 2016 WGC-Bridgestone Invitational was only sanctioned by the PGA Tour. It was not sanctioned by the European Tour due to a schedule change for the Olympic Games.) | 69-73-66-66=274 | −6 | 1 stroke | (United States) Scott Piercy |
| 12 | Sep 11, 2016 | BMW Championship (2) | 67-63-68-67=265 | −23 | 3 strokes | (England) Paul Casey |
| 13 | Feb 19, 2017 | Genesis Open | 66-66-64-71=267 | −17 | 5 strokes | (United States) Scott Brown, (Belgium) Thomas Pieters |
| 14 | Mar 5, 2017 | WGC-Mexico Championship (2) | 70-66-66-68=270 | −14 | 1 stroke | (England) Tommy Fleetwood |
| 15 | Mar 26, 2017 | WGC-Dell Technologies Match Play | 1 up | | | (Spain) Jon Rahm |
| 16 | Aug 27, 2017 | The Northern Trust (2) | 65-69-67-66=267 | −13 | Playoff | (United States) Jordan Spieth |
| 17 | Jan 7, 2018 | Sentry Tournament of Champions (2) | 69-68-66-65=268 | −24 | 8 strokes | (Spain) Jon Rahm |
| 18 | Jun 10, 2018 | FedEx St. Jude Classic (2) | 67-63-65-66=261 | −19 | 6 strokes | (United States) Andrew Putnam |
| 19 | Jul 29, 2018 | RBC Canadian Open | 68-66-65-66=265 | −23 | 3 strokes | (South Korea) An Byeong-hun, (South Korea) Kim Meen-whee |
| 20 | Feb 24, 2019 | WGC-Mexico Championship (3) | 64-67-66-66=263 | −21 | 5 strokes | (Northern Ireland) Rory McIlroy |
| 21 | Jun 28, 2020 | Travelers Championship | 69-64-61-67=261 | −19 | 1 stroke | (United States) Kevin Streelman |
| 22 | Aug 23, 2020 | The Northern Trust (3) | 67-60-64-63=254 | −30 | 11 strokes | (United States) Harris English |
| 23 | Sep 7, 2020 | Tour Championship | 67-70-64-68=269 | −21^{1} | 3 strokes | (United States) Xander Schauffele, (United States) Justin Thomas |
| 24 | Nov 15, 2020 | Masters Tournament | 65-70-65-68=268 | −20 | 5 strokes | (South Korea) Im Sung-jae, (Australia) Cameron Smith |

^{1}Started tournament at −10 FedEx Cup playoffs adjustment, scored −11 to par.

PGA Tour playoff record (1–2)

| No. | Year | Tournament | Opponent(s) | Result |
|---|---|---|---|---|
| 1 | 2015 | Northern Trust Open | (England) Paul Casey, (United States) James Hahn | Hahn won with birdie on third extra hole Casey eliminated by birdie on second hole |
| 2 | 2017 | The Northern Trust | (United States) Jordan Spieth | Won with birdie on first extra hole |
| 3 | 2020 | BMW Championship | (Spain) Jon Rahm | Lost to birdie on first extra hole |

=== European Tour wins (9) ===
Legend
Major championships (2)
World Golf Championships (5)
Race to Dubai finals series (1) (Note: The 2013 WGC-HSBC Champions was also a Race to Dubai finals series tournament.)
Other European Tour (2)

| No. | Date | Tournament | Winning score | To par | Margin of victory | Runner(s)-up |
|---|---|---|---|---|---|---|
| 1 | Nov 3, 2013 | WGC-HSBC Champions | 69-63-66-66=264 | −24 | 3 strokes | (England) Ian Poulter |
| 2 | Mar 8, 2015 | WGC-Cadillac Championship | 68-73-69-69=279 | −9 | 1 stroke | (United States) J. B. Holmes |
| 3 | Jun 19, 2016 | U.S. Open | 67-69-71-69=276 | −4 | 3 strokes | (United States) Jim Furyk, (Republic of Ireland) Shane Lowry, (United States) Scott Piercy |
| 4 | Mar 5, 2017 | WGC-Mexico Championship (2) | 70-66-66-68=270 | −14 | 1 stroke | (England) Tommy Fleetwood |
| 5 | Mar 26, 2017 | WGC-Dell Technologies Match Play | 1 up | | | (Spain) Jon Rahm |
| 6 | Feb 3, 2019 | Saudi International | 68-61-65-67=261 | −19 | 2 strokes | (China) Li Haotong |
| 7 | Feb 24, 2019 | WGC-Mexico Championship (3) | 64-67-66-66=263 | −21 | 5 strokes | (Northern Ireland) Rory McIlroy |
| 8 | Nov 15, 2020 | Masters Tournament | 65-70-65-68=268 | −20 | 5 strokes | (South Korea) Im Sung-jae, (Australia) Cameron Smith |
| 9 | Feb 7, 2021 | Saudi International (2) | 67-64-66-68=265 | −15 | 2 strokes | (United States) Tony Finau, (England) Justin Rose |

=== LIV Golf League wins (3) ===
| No. | Date | Tournament | Winning score | Margin of victory | Runners-up |
|---|---|---|---|---|---|
| 1 | Sep 4, 2022 | LIV Golf Invitational Boston | −15 (67-63-65=195) | Playoff | (India) Anirban Lahiri, (Chile) Joaquín Niemann |
| 2 | May 14, 2023 | LIV Golf Tulsa^{1} | −17 (63-63-67=193) | Playoff | (South Africa) Branden Grace, (Australia) Cameron Smith |
| 3 | Feb 10, 2024 | LIV Golf Las Vegas | −12 (67-62-69=198) | 1 stroke | (United States) Talor Gooch, (United States) Peter Uihlein |

^{1}Co-sanctioned by the MENA Tour

LIV Golf League playoff record (2–0)

| No. | Year | Tournament | Opponents | Result |
|---|---|---|---|---|
| 1 | 2022 | LIV Golf Invitational Boston | (India) Anirban Lahiri, (Chile) Joaquín Niemann | Won with eagle on first extra hole |
| 2 | 2023 | LIV Golf Tulsa | (South Africa) Branden Grace, (Australia) Cameron Smith | Won with birdie on first extra hole |

=== Other wins (1) ===
| No. | Date | Tournament | Winning score | To par | Margin of victory | Runners-up |
|---|---|---|---|---|---|---|
| 1 | Dec 12, 2010 | Shark Shootout (with (England) Ian Poulter) | 63-64-59=186 | −30 | 2 strokes | (Northern Ireland) Darren Clarke and (Northern Ireland) Graeme McDowell |

== Major championships ==
=== Wins (2) ===
| Year | Championship | 54 holes | Winning score | Margin | Runners-up |
|---|---|---|---|---|---|
| 2016 | U.S. Open | 4 shot deficit | −4 (67-69-71-69=276) | 3 strokes | (United States) Jim Furyk, (Republic of Ireland) Shane Lowry, (United States) Scott Piercy |
| 2020 | Masters Tournament | 4 shot lead | −20 (65-70-65-68=268) | 5 strokes | (South Korea) Im Sung-jae, (Australia) Cameron Smith |

=== Results timeline ===
Results not in chronological order in 2020.

| Tournament | 2008 | 2009 | 2010 | 2011 | 2012 | 2013 | 2014 | 2015 | 2016 | 2017 | 2018 |
|---|---|---|---|---|---|---|---|---|---|---|---|
| Masters Tournament | | T30 | T38 | T38 | | T13 | CUT | T6 | T4 | | T10 |
| U.S. Open | T48 | T40 | T8 | T23 | CUT | 55 | T4 | T2 | 1 | CUT | 3 |
| The Open Championship | | CUT | T14 | T2 | T9 | T32 | T12 | T49 | T9 | T54 | CUT |
| PGA Championship | | T10 | T5 | CUT | T48 | T8 | | T7 | CUT | T13 | T27 |

| Tournament | 2019 | 2020 | 2021 | 2022 | 2023 | 2024 | 2025 | 2026 |
|---|---|---|---|---|---|---|---|---|
| Masters Tournament | T2 | 1 | CUT | T12 | T48 | CUT | CUT | T33 |
| PGA Championship | 2 | T2 | CUT | CUT | T55 | T43 | CUT | T44 |
| U.S. Open | T35 | T6 | T19 | T24 | T10 | CUT | CUT | T32 |
| The Open Championship | T51 | NT | T8 | T6 | CUT | T31 | T23 | |

Win
Top 10
Did not play

CUT = missed the half-way cut
T = tied for a place
NT = no tournament due to COVID-19 pandemic

=== Summary ===
| Tournament | Wins | 2nd | 3rd | Top-5 | Top-10 | Top-25 | Events | Cuts made |
|---|---|---|---|---|---|---|---|---|
| Masters Tournament | 1 | 1 | 0 | 3 | 5 | 7 | 16 | 12 |
| PGA Championship | 0 | 2 | 0 | 3 | 6 | 7 | 17 | 12 |
| U.S. Open | 1 | 1 | 1 | 4 | 7 | 10 | 19 | 15 |
| The Open Championship | 0 | 1 | 0 | 1 | 5 | 8 | 16 | 13 |
| Totals | 2 | 5 | 1 | 11 | 23 | 32 | 68 | 52 |

- Most consecutive cuts made – 9 (2014 U.S. Open – 2016 Open)
- Longest streak of top-10s – 4 (2015 PGA – 2016 Open)

== Results in The Players Championship ==
| Tournament | 2008 | 2009 |
|---|---|---|
| The Players Championship | CUT | T79 |

| Tournament | 2010 | 2011 | 2012 | 2013 | 2014 | 2015 | 2016 | 2017 | 2018 | 2019 |
|---|---|---|---|---|---|---|---|---|---|---|
| The Players Championship | T34 | T57 | | WD | T59 | T69 | T28 | T12 | T17 | T5 |

| Tournament | 2020 | 2021 | 2022 |
|---|---|---|---|
| The Players Championship | C | T48 | T9 |

Top 10
Did not play

CUT = missed the halfway cut
WD = withdrew
"T" indicates a tie for a place
C = Canceled after the first round due to the COVID-19 pandemic

== World Golf Championships ==
=== Wins (6) ===
| Year | Championship | 54 holes | Winning score | Margin | Runner-up |
|---|---|---|---|---|---|
| 2013 | WGC-HSBC Champions | 3 shot lead | −24 (69-63-66-66=264) | 3 strokes | (England) Ian Poulter |
| 2015 | WGC-Cadillac Championship | 5 shot deficit | −9 (68-73-69-69=279) | 1 stroke | (United States) J. B. Holmes |
| 2016 | WGC-Bridgestone Invitational | 3 shot deficit | −6 (69-73-66-66=274) | 1 stroke | (United States) Scott Piercy |
| 2017 | WGC-Mexico Championship (2) | 1 shot deficit | −14 (70-66-66-68=270) | 1 stroke | (England) Tommy Fleetwood |
| 2017 | WGC-Dell Technologies Match Play | n/a | 1 up | | (Spain) Jon Rahm |
| 2019 | WGC-Mexico Championship (3) | 4 shot lead | −21 (64-67-66-66=263) | 5 strokes | (Northern Ireland) Rory McIlroy |

=== Results timeline ===
Results not in chronological order before 2015.

| Tournament | 2009 | 2010 | 2011 | 2012 | 2013 | 2014 | 2015 | 2016 | 2017 | 2018 | 2019 | 2020 | 2021 | 2022 |
|---|---|---|---|---|---|---|---|---|---|---|---|---|---|---|
| Championship | T35 | T56 | 2 | T35 | T12 | T4 | 1 | T14 | 1 | T7 | 1 | T48 | T54 | |
| Match Play | R64 | R64 | R64 | R16 | R64 | R64 | T17 | QF | 1 | T59 | T40 | NT^{1} | T28 | 4 |
| Invitational | T22 | 15 | T48 | T19 | T33 | | T53 | 1 | T17 | T3 | T20 | T12 | T10 | |
| Champions | | | | T39 | 1 | | T5 | T35 | T2 | T30 | | NT^{1} | NT^{1} | NT^{1} |

^{1}Cancelled due to COVID-19 pandemic

Win
Top 10
Did not play

QF, R16, R32, R64 = Round in which player lost in match play
NT = No tournament
T = Tied for a place
Note that the Championship and Invitational were discontinued from 2022.

== PGA Tour career summary ==
| Season | Starts | Cuts made | Wins (majors) | 2nd | 3rd | Top-10 | Top-25 | Best finish | Earnings ($) | Money list rank |
|---|---|---|---|---|---|---|---|---|---|---|
| 2007 | 1 | 0 | 0 | 0 | 0 | 0 | 0 | Cut | 0 | 0 |
| 2008 | 30 | 17 | 1 | 0 | 0 | 3 | 6 | 1 | 1,789,895 | 42 |
| 2009 | 25 | 20 | 1 | 0 | 0 | 5 | 11 | 1 | 2,977,901 | 15 |
| 2010 | 23 | 20 | 2 | 0 | 1 | 7 | 12 | 1 | 4,473,122 | 4 |
| 2011 | 21 | 17 | 1 | 2 | 1 | 6 | 9 | 1 | 4,309,961 | 5 |
| 2012 | 19 | 17 | 1 | 0 | 1 | 9 | 11 | 1 | 3,393,820 | 19 |
| 2013 | 22 | 16 | 1 | 1 | 0 | 6 | 8 | 1 | 2,963,214 | 19 |
| 2013–14 | 17 | 14 | 1 | 2 | 0 | 7 | 10 | 1 | 4,249,180 | 12 |
| 2014–15 | 21 | 18 | 1 | 2 | 0 | 11 | 13 | 1 | 5,509,467 | 5 |
| 2015–16 | 22 | 21 | 3 (1) | 1 | 2 | 15 | 19 | 1 | 9,365,185 | 1 |
| 2016–17 | 20 | 17 | 4 | 1 | 1 | 8 | 14 | 1 | 8,732,193 | 3 |
| 2017–18 | 20 | 19 | 3 | 2 | 3 | 12 | 17 | 1 | 8,457,352 | 2 |
| 2018–19 | 19 | 18 | 1 | 2 | 0 | 7 | 10 | 1 | 5,534,619 | 7 |
| 2019–20 | 14 | 11 | 3 | 2 | 0 | 7 | 9 | 1 | 5,837,267 | 3 |
| 2020–21 | 21 | 17 | 1 (1) | 1 | 0 | 9 | 13 | 1 | 5,001,136 | 17 |
| 2021–22 | 12 | 9 | 0 | 0 | 0 | 3 | 6 | 4 | 1,617,749 | n/a** |
| Career* | 307 | 251 | 24 (2) | 16 | 9 | 115 | 168 | 1 | $74,897,059 | 3 |

* As of 2021–22 season.
** Johnson was removed from the official money list for 2021–22 due to his joining LIV Golf and resigning his PGA Tour membership in June 2022.

== U.S. national team appearances ==
Amateur

- Walker Cup: 2007 (winners)
- Palmer Cup: 2007 (winners)

Professional

- Ryder Cup: 2010, 2012, 2016 (winners), 2018, 2021 (winners)
- Presidents Cup: 2011 (winners), 2015 (winners), 2017 (winners), 2019 (winners)
- Wendy's 3-Tour Challenge (representing PGA Tour): 2010 (winners)

== See also ==
- 2007 PGA Tour Qualifying School graduates
- List of golfers with most PGA Tour wins
- List of golfers with most European Tour wins
- List of World Number One male golfers
