= LIV Golf Invitational Boston =

Tournament information
- Location: Bolton, Massachusetts
- Established: 2022
- Course: The Oaks Golf Course at The International
- Par: 72
- Length: 7,100 yards (6,500 m)
- Tour: LIV Golf
- Format: Individual and team stroke play
- Prize fund: US$20,000,000 (individual); US$5,000,000 (team)
- Month played: September
- Final year: 2022

Tournament record score
- Aggregate: 195 Dustin Johnson (2022); 195 Anirban Lahiri (2022); 195 Joaquín Niemann (2022)
- To par: −15 as above

Final champion
- (United States) Dustin Johnson

Location map
- Location in the United States Location in Massachusetts

The LIV Golf Invitational Boston was a golf tournament held in Bolton, Massachusetts, outside of Boston at The Oaks Golf Course at The International. The tournament was held in September 2022 as part of the LIV Golf Invitational Series, a golf series led by Greg Norman and funded by the Saudi Arabian Public Investment Fund. The 2022 48-player field included Phil Mickelson, Dustin Johnson, Brooks Koepka, Bryson DeChambeau, Patrick Reed and Sergio García.

== Format ==
The tournament will be a 54-hole individual stroke play event, with a team element. Four man teams will be selected via a draft by their designated team captains, with a set number of their total scores counting for the team on each day. Each round commenced with a shotgun start, with the leaders beginning on the first hole for the final round, in order to finish on the eighteenth.

== Inaugural field ==
48 golfers participated in the inaugural LIV Boston event. (Note: (c) – Team captain)

- Shergo Al Kurdi (Note: Smith, Niemann, Varner III, Tringale, Leishman, Lahiri and Al Kurdi made their first appearances in the series.) (Note: Al Kurdi replaced Henrik Stenson, who was suffering from vertigo.)
- Abraham Ancer
- Richard Bland
- Laurie Canter
- Paul Casey
- Eugenio Chacarra
- Bryson DeChambeau (c)
- Sergio García (c)
- Talor Gooch
- Branden Grace
- Sam Horsfield
- Charles Howell III
- Dustin Johnson (c)
- Matt Jones
- Sadom Kaewkanjana
- Martin Kaymer (c)
- Phachara Khongwatmai
- Sihwan Kim
- Brooks Koepka (c)
- Chase Koepka
- Jason Kokrak
- Anirban Lahiri
- Marc Leishman
- Graeme McDowell
- Phil Mickelson (c)
- Jediah Morgan
- Kevin Na (c)
- Joaquín Niemann
- Shaun Norris
- Louis Oosthuizen (c)
- Wade Ormsby (c)
- Carlos Ortiz
- Adrián Otaegui
- Pat Perez
- Turk Pettit
- James Piot
- Ian Poulter
- Patrick Reed
- Charl Schwartzel
- Cameron Smith
- Hudson Swafford (c)
- Cameron Tringale
- Peter Uihlein
- Harold Varner III
- Scott Vincent
- Lee Westwood
- Bernd Wiesberger
- Matthew Wolff

=== Teams ===
- 4 Aces GC: Johnson (c), Gooch, Perez, Reed
- Cleeks GC: Kaymer (c), McDowell, Canter, Bland
- Crusher GC: DeChambeau (c), Casey, Howell III, Lahiri
- Fireball GC: García (c), Ancer, Ortiz, Chacarra
- HY Flyers GC: Mickelson (c), Wiesberger, Wolff, Tringale
- Iron Heads GC: Na (c), Kaewkanjana, Khongwatmai, Kim
- Majesticks GC: Westwood (c), Al Kurdi, Poulter, Horsfield
- Niblicks GC: Swafford, Piot, Pettit, Varner III
- Punch GC: Ormsby, Jones, Leishman, Smith
- Smash GC: B. Koepka (c), C. Koepka, Kokrak, Uihlein
- Stinger GC: Oosthuizen (c), Schwartzel, Grace, Norris
- Torque GC: Niemann, Vincent, Otaegui, Morgan

== Winners ==
=== Individual ===
Year	Winner	Score	To par	Margin of victory	Runners-up
2022	(United States) Dustin Johnson	195	−15	Playoff (Note: Johnson won with an eagle on the first hole of a sudden-death playoff.)	(India) Anirban Lahiri (Chile) Joaquín Niemann

=== Team ===
Year	Winners	Score (to par)	Margin of victory	Runners-up
2022	4 Aces GC (Note: Talor Gooch, Dustin Johnson (c), Pat Perez and Patrick Reed)	−32	2 strokes	Crushers GC (Note: Paul Casey, Bryson DeChambeau (c), Charles Howell III and Anirban Lahiri)
