= The International (golf course) =

Golf course in Bolton, Massachusetts

The International Golf Club & Resort
- Location within Massachusetts
- 42°25′54″N 71°38′49″W

Club information
- Location: 159 Ballville Rd, Bolton, MA, USA 01740
- Established: 1899
- Tota holes: 36

The International Golf Club & Resort (commonly referred to as The International) is a 36 hole golf course located in Bolton, Massachusetts. At one time, it had the longest 18 hole course in the United States and in 2022 hosted the LIV Golf Invitational Boston.

== History ==
The International was originally a nine-hole public course founded as Runaway Brook Golf Club in 1899. The course was purchased in the 1950s by Albert Surprenant and the original course was replaced by an 18 hole layout known as the Pines. The course filed for bankruptcy in 2020, citing the COVID-19 pandemic. It was subsequently purchased by Escalante Golf for $10 million.

The International hosted the LIV Golf Invitational Boston in 2022.

== Layout ==
The International is a 36 hole private golf course. It has two 18 hole courses on the property, the Pines and the Oaks. The Pines was originally designed by Geoffrey Cornish and later redesigned by Robert Trent Jones. At one times was the longest 18 hole course in the United States, but was shortened with a redesign by golf architecture firm Coore & Crenshaw.
