= Ryan Moore (golfer) =

American professional golfer (born 1982)

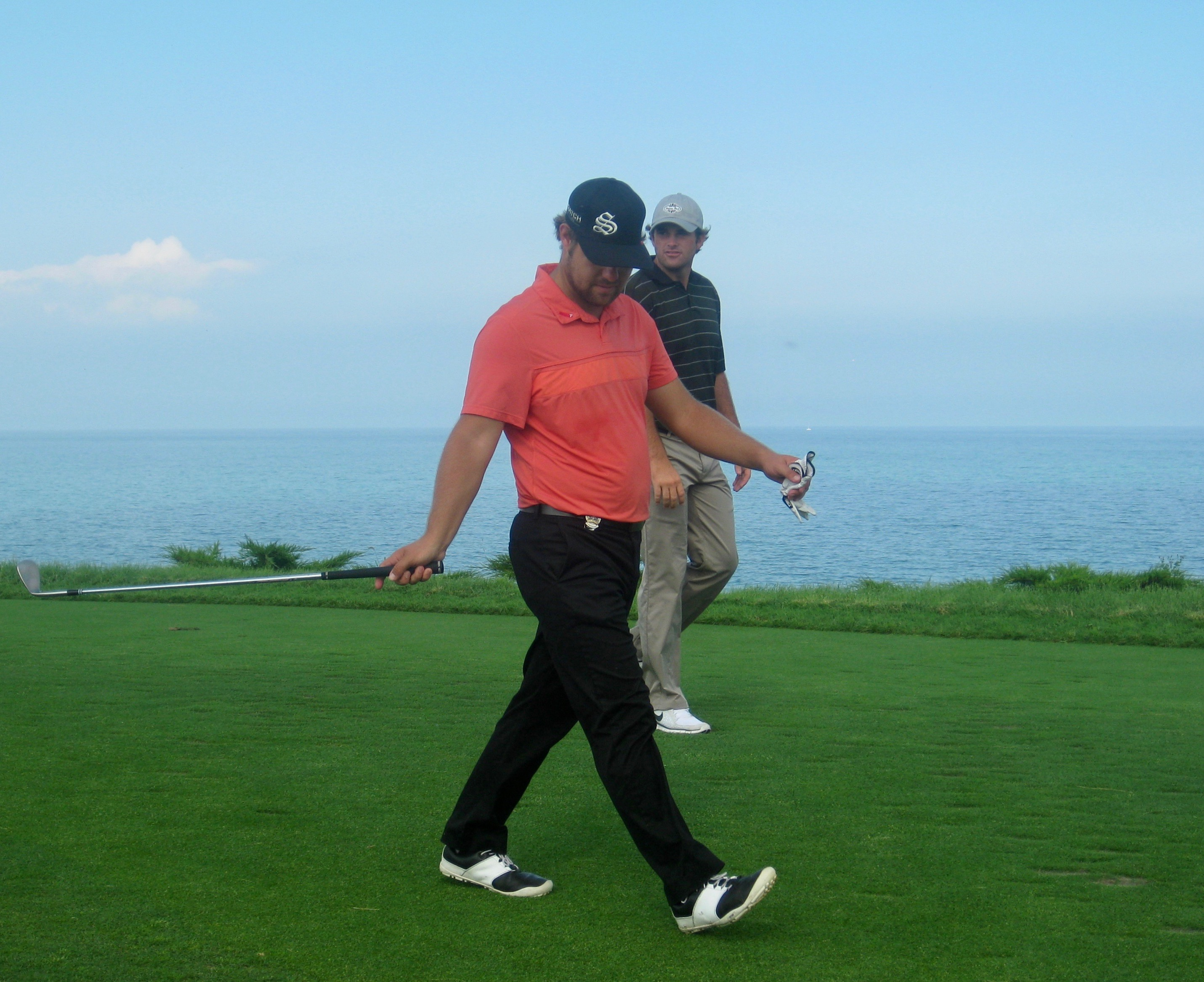
- Moore at the 2010 PGA Championship

Personal information
- Full name: Ryan David Moore
- Nationality: United States
- Born: December 5, 1982 (age 43) Tacoma, Washington, U.S.
- Height: 5 ft 9 in (1.75 m)
- Weight: 170 lb (77 kg; 12 st)
- Spouse: Nichole Olson (m. 2011)
- Children: 3

Career
- Sport: Golf
- College: UNLV
- Turned professional: 2005
- Current tour: PGA Tour
- Professional wins: 5
- Highest ranking: 27 (November 2, 2014)

Number of wins by tour
- PGA Tour: 5
- Asian Tour: 2

Best results in major championships
- Masters Tournament: T9: 2017
- PGA Championship: T9: 2006
- U.S. Open: T10: 2009
- The Open Championship: T12: 2014, 2018

Achievements and awards
- Haskins Award: 2005
- Ben Hogan Award: 2005

Ryan David Moore (born December 5, 1982) is an American professional golfer, currently playing on the PGA Tour. He had a highly successful amateur career, winning the NCAA Individual Championship, the U.S. Amateur Public Links, and the U.S. Amateur in 2004. Since turning professional in 2005 he has won five titles on the PGA Tour as of the 2016 season and earned rankings inside the top thirty in the world.

== Early life ==
Moore was born in Tacoma, Washington, and grew up in nearby Puyallup. He graduated in 2001 from Cascade Christian High School, a small Class 1A school which did not then have a golf team. Moore competed for Class 4A Puyallup High School, where he lettered all four years (1998–2001). He was the runner-up in the U.S. Junior Amateur in 2000, and won the high school individual state championship in 2001 over Andres Gonzales, a future UNLV teammate, then of Capital High School of Olympia.

== Amateur career ==
Moore accepted a scholarship to UNLV, where he lettered for four seasons for the Rebels and graduated in 2005 with a degree in communications and public relations. During 2004 prior to his senior year of college, Moore had one of the most impressive seasons in the modern era of amateur golf. He captured multiple titles, including the U.S. Amateur, the Western Amateur, the U.S. Amateur Public Links (also won in 2002) and the NCAA individual championship. In 2005 he was given the Ben Hogan Award as the top college player.

Moore is one of only five golfers in history to win both the NCAA Individual Championship and the U.S. Amateur in the same year (2004) along with Tiger Woods, Jack Nicklaus, Phil Mickelson, and Bryson DeChambeau.

Moore won the Haskins Award in 2005 as the outstanding collegiate golfer in the nation. He placed 13th at the 2005 Masters, winning low amateur and a spot in the 2006 field. This is still the lowest amateur score in Masters history. (In 2003, he also made the cut at the Masters, finishing 45th at age 20.)

Moore's final tournament as an amateur was the 2005 U.S. Open at Pinehurst #2; where he made the cut and finished tied for 57th.

== Professional career ==
Moore then turned professional and played the next tournament, at Westchester Classic, on a sponsor's exemption, where he finished in a tie for 51st.

Turning professional meant that he had to forfeit his slot (as reigning U.S. Amateur champion) in the 2005 Open Championship, played at the home of golf, St Andrews. In August, Moore earned a special temporary exemption to the PGA Tour with a tie for second at the 2005 Canadian Open in Vancouver, British Columbia.

In 2005, Moore played on sponsors' exemptions and earned a total of $686,250 in just 14 official PGA Tour events. This placed him the equivalent of 113th on the money list, making him the first player since Tiger Woods in 1996 to go from college to the PGA Tour in the same season without going to Q School. The only other players to do that since 1980 were Gary Hallberg, Phil Mickelson, and Justin Leonard. As a non-member, Moore needed to collect more than the 125th-place finisher on the 2005 money list in order to earn his card for the 2006 season. During 2005, Moore's world ranking improved from 718 to 142.

In 2006, Moore played on the PGA Tour as a regular member, and his best outing was a tie for second at the Buick Championship in Connecticut. He was sidelined for two months in the spring following surgery on his left wrist, which kept him from competing in the 2006 Masters. He returned to the tour in late May and finished 81st on the 2006 money list with $1,222,118. With a top ten finish (tied for ninth) at the 2006 PGA Championship at Medinah on August 20, he broke into the top 100 in the world rankings for the first time, vaulting from 110th to 79th. He climbed as high as 68th in early September, and finished the year at 79th in the world.

In 2007, Moore finished solo second place at the Memorial Tournament, hosted by Jack Nicklaus in early June. He entered the event as an alternate and earned $648,000, the largest paycheck of his young pro career. With six holes to play, he birdied five consecutive holes (13-17), but scored a par on the 72nd hole to finish one stroke back. Following this runner-up finish, his third as a professional, he climbed from 87th to 33rd on the PGA Tour money list, and his world ranking improved from 110th to 59th. Two days later, he qualified to play in the 2007 U.S. Open at Oakmont near Pittsburgh, Pennsylvania, where he shot 8-over in the first round and 3-over in the second and missed the cut by one stroke. He finished the year with $1,544,901 in winnings, ranking him 59th on the PGA Tour money list and 51st in the FedEx Cup standings. Moore finished the year at 74th in the world rankings.

Moore reached the first playoff of his career in the 2008 EDS Byron Nelson Championship, which he lost to Adam Scott on the third playoff hole. Moore began the day three shots behind Scott in a four-way tie for second place, but took the lead as Scott dropped three strokes on the front nine. The lead changed hands multiple times before Scott forced the playoff with a birdie on the 72nd hole. On the third playoff hole, Scott beat Moore with a 48-foot birdie putt; Moore then missed his tying birdie putt from the fringe. Moore picked up his largest check of his career, winning $691,200 for second place. It was his fourth runner-up finish on the PGA Tour in as many seasons.

Moore continued to have pain in his surgically repaired wrist and took time off at different points in the 2008 season because of a sore shoulder and to improve his fitness, particularly in preparation for the FedEx Cup. He ended the year with $1,214,900 in winnings, ranking him 88th on the PGA Tour money list and 87th in the FedEx Cup standings; his world ranking fell to 158.

Moore's inconsistent golf continued in the first half of 2009. In his first 16 tournaments, Moore missed the cut eight times, including four times by a single stroke. In March and April, Moore made four consecutive cuts, with two top-20 finishes. In May, Moore only managed one made cut in The Players Championship, where he struggled on the weekend to a 71st-place finish, last among those making the cut.

After missing the cut at the Memorial Tournament, Moore qualified for the 2009 U.S. Open at Bethpage Black with a tie for seventh place at sectional qualifying in Columbus, Ohio. He made a strong showing, finishing in a tie for tenth place at 2-over par 282. As a result, his world golf ranking rebounded from 193rd to 152nd.

On August 23, Moore won his first career PGA Tour event at the Wyndham Championship, defeating Kevin Stadler and Jason Bohn in a sudden-death playoff, earning $936,000. He finished the 2009 season at 31st on the PGA Tour money list ($2,222,871), 22nd in the FedEx Cup standings, and 51st in the world rankings.

Moore had a steady year in 2010, with six top-10 finishes, including a second-place finish at the AT&T National. He finished 32nd on the PGA Tour's money list with $2,374,823, 35th in the FedEx Cup Standings, and 45th in the world rankings. He appeared in all four of the golf majors for the first time. Moore also shot the course record of 61 at Tacoma Golf and Country Club.

In October 2012, Moore won for the second time on the PGA Tour at the Justin Timberlake Shriners Hospitals for Children Open, part of the 2012 PGA Tour Fall Series. He converted a share of the 54-hole lead into a victory, one stroke ahead of runner-up Brendon De Jonge. Moore finished 2012 at 26th on the PGA Tour's money list with $2,858,944, 64th in the FedEx Cup Standings, and 40th in the world rankings.

Moore had a down year in 2013, with only three top-10 finishes. For the season he finished 61st on the PGA Tour's money list.

The PGA Tour instituted a wrap-around season for its 2014 season extending from October 2013 to September 2014, incorporating the prior Fall Series events and a few international events into the subsequent season's schedule. Moore opened the Malaysian CIMB Classic (held in October 2013) with a 63, and went on to win the tournament in a playoff with Gary Woodland. This was Moore's only victory in the 2014 season, in which he had seven top-10s and finished 21st on the PGA Tour's money list.

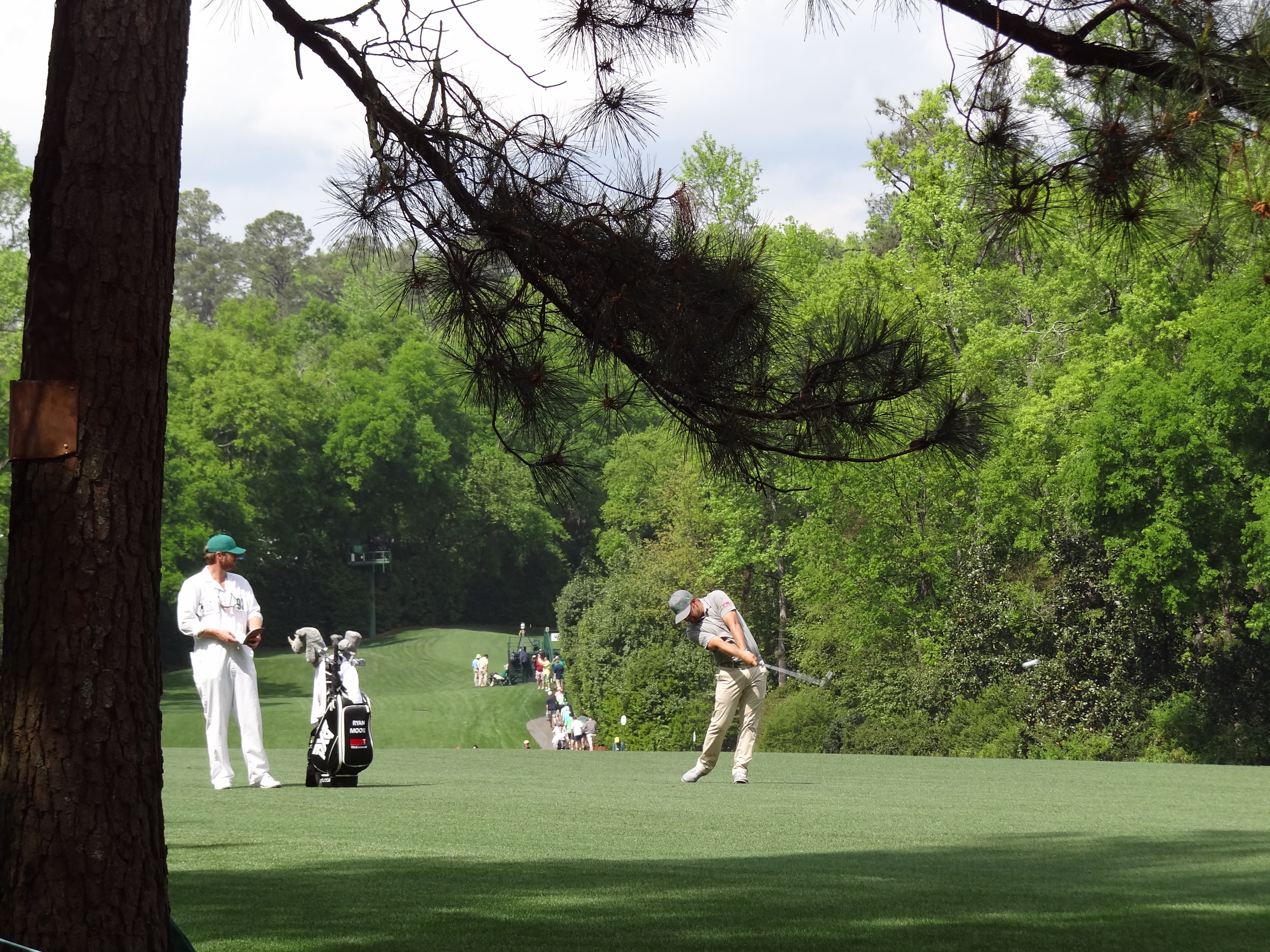
Moore at the 2015 Masters Tournament.

In November 2014 (part of the 2015 PGA Tour season), Moore won the Malaysian CIMB Classic once again. Moore contended for the WGC-Cadillac Championship at Doral in March, but fell back over the weekend and finished in a tie for ninth place. The following week at the Valspar Championship, Moore led after three rounds but faltered on Sunday to finish two strokes back in fifth place. Moore had the one victory in the 2015 season, with four top-10s, and finished 32nd in FedEx Cup points.

== Amateur wins ==
- 2002 U.S. Amateur Public Links
- 2004 U.S. Amateur, Western Amateur, U.S. Amateur Public Links, NCAA Division I Championship, Sahalee Players Championship

== Professional wins (5) ==
=== PGA Tour wins (5) ===
No.	Date	Tournament	Winning score	To par	Margin of victory	Runner(s)-up
1	Aug 23, 2009	Wyndham Championship	64-65-70-65=264	−16	Playoff	(United States) Jason Bohn, (United States) Kevin Stadler
2	Oct 7, 2012	Justin Timberlake Shriners Hospitals for Children Open	61-68-65-66=260	−24	1 stroke	(Zimbabwe) Brendon de Jonge
3	Oct 28, 2013	CIMB Classic^{1}	63-72-69-70=274	−14	Playoff	(United States) Gary Woodland
4	Nov 2, 2014	CIMB Classic^{1} (2)	68-69-67-67=271	−17	3 strokes	(Spain) Sergio García, (United States) Kevin Na, (United States) Gary Woodland
5	Aug 14, 2016	John Deere Classic	65-65-65-67=262	−22	2 strokes	(United States) Ben Martin

^{1}Co-sanctioned by the Asian Tour

PGA Tour playoff record (2–3)

No.	Year	Tournament	Opponent(s)	Result
1	2008	EDS Byron Nelson Championship	(Australia) Adam Scott	Lost to birdie on third extra hole
2	2009	Wyndham Championship	(United States) Jason Bohn, (United States) Kevin Stadler	Won with birdie on third extra hole Bohn eliminated by par on first hole
3	2013	CIMB Classic	(United States) Gary Woodland	Won with birdie on first extra hole
4	2016	Tour Championship	(United States) Kevin Chappell, (Northern Ireland) Rory McIlroy	McIlroy won with birdie on fourth extra hole Chappell eliminated by birdie on first hole
5	2018	Safeway Open	(United States) Brandt Snedeker, (United States) Kevin Tway	Tway won with birdie on third extra hole Snedeker eliminated by par on first hole

== Results in major championships ==
Tournament	2002	2003	2004	2005	2006	2007	2008	2009
Masters Tournament		T45		T13LA				
U.S. Open	CUT			T57		CUT		T10
The Open Championship						T42		
PGA Championship					T9	CUT	CUT	

Tournament	2010	2011	2012	2013	2014	2015	2016	2017	2018
Masters Tournament	T14	T35		T38	CUT	T12	CUT	T9	T28
U.S. Open	T33	CUT		CUT	T48	CUT	T32		
The Open Championship	CUT	T28		T32	T12	CUT	T46	CUT	T12
PGA Championship	T65	T56	CUT	T55	T40	T37	T70	T13	T59

Tournament	2019
Masters Tournament	
PGA Championship	CUT
U.S. Open	
The Open Championship	

Top 10
Did not play

LA = Low amateur
CUT = missed the half-way cut
"T" = tied

=== Summary ===
Tournament	Wins	2nd	3rd	Top-5	Top-10	Top-25	Events	Cuts made
Masters Tournament	0	0	0	0	1	4	10	8
PGA Championship	0	0	0	0	1	2	13	9
U.S. Open	0	0	0	0	1	1	10	5
The Open Championship	0	0	0	0	0	2	9	6
Totals	0	0	0	0	3	9	42	28

- Most consecutive cuts made – 4 (four times)
- Longest streak of top-10s – 1 (three times)

== Results in The Players Championship ==
Tournament	2007	2008	2009	2010	2011	2012	2013	2014	2015	2016	2017	2018	2019	2020	2021	2022	2023	2024
The Players Championship	T68	T27	70	T47	T33	T46	CUT	T26	CUT	CUT	T53	T30	T20	C	T35			T45

CUT = missed the halfway cut
"T" indicates a tie for a place
C = Canceled after the first round due to the COVID-19 pandemic

== Results in World Golf Championships ==
Results not in chronological order prior to 2015.

Tournament	2009	2010	2011	2012	2013	2014	2015	2016	2017
Championship			T22		T53	T25	T9		T28
Match Play		R64	QF		R64	R32	T52	T5	T30
Invitational		T16	T23		T33	T8	T42		T28
Champions	3				T50	T28		T23	

Top 10
Did not play

QF, R16, R32, R64 = Round in which player lost in match play
"T" = tied

== PGA Tour career summary ==
Season	Wins	Earnings ($)	Rank
2005	0	686,250	n/a
2006	0	1,122,118	81
2007	0	1,554,901	59
2008	0	1,214,900	88
2009	1	2,222,871	31
2010	0	2,374,823	32
2011	0	1,942,906	42
2012	1	2,858,944	26
2013	0	1,490,265	61
2014	1	3,098,263	21
2015	1	2,642,306	32
2016	1	3,701,034	16
2017	0	1,751,851	61
2018	0	1,986,608	56
2019	0	1,838,788	59
2020	0	957,540	95
2021	0	777,994	143
2022	0	282,801	192
2023	0	1,234,755	126
Career*	5	31,444,368	35

* As of the 2020 season.

== U.S. national team appearances ==
Amateur

- Palmer Cup: 2003, 2004
- Walker Cup: 2003
- Eisenhower Trophy: 2004 (team winners and individual leader)

Professional

- Ryder Cup: 2016 (winners)
