= J. B. Holmes =

American professional golfer (born 1982)

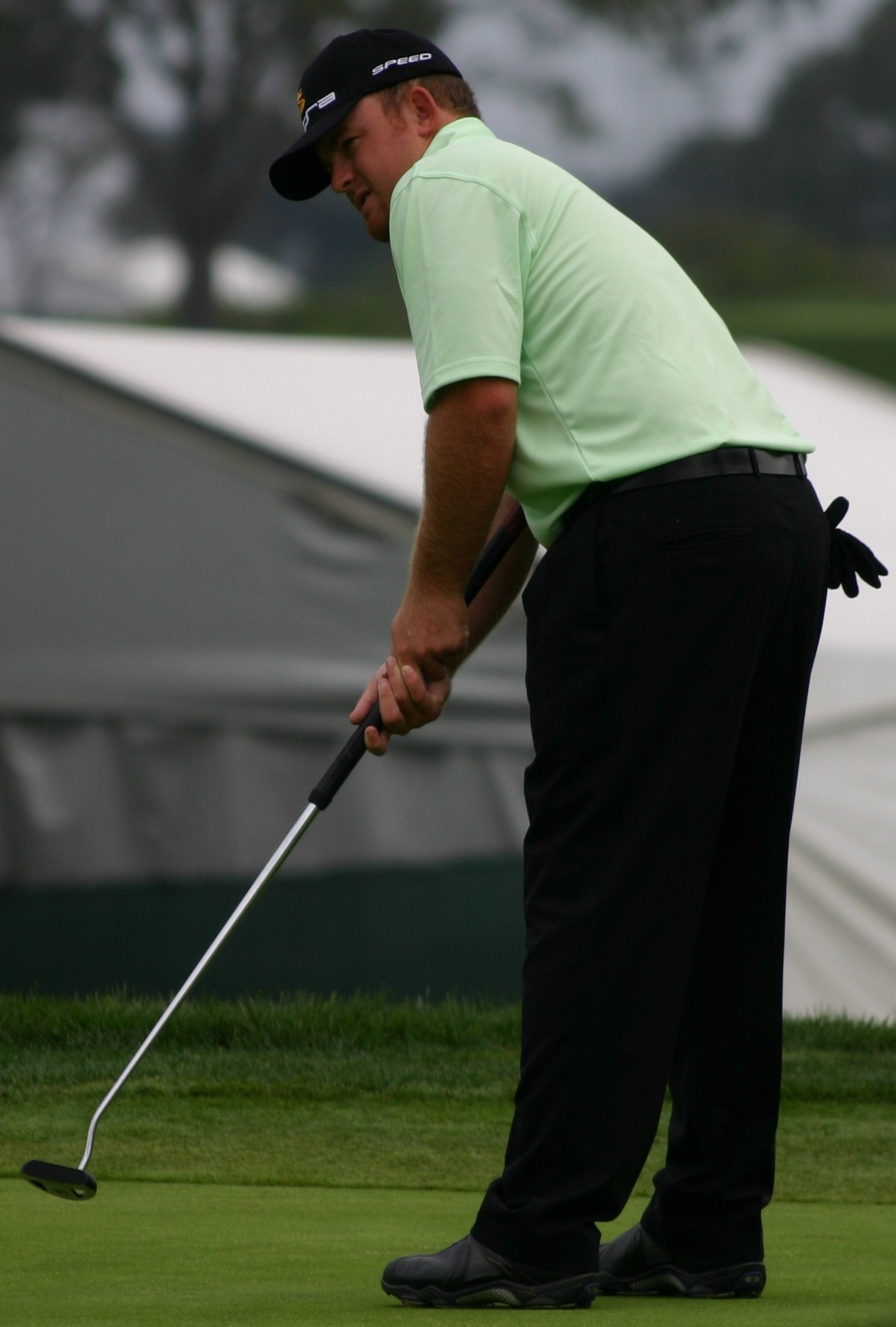

Personal information
- Full name: John Bradley Holmes
- Nickname: JB
- Nationality: United States
- Born: April 26, 1982 (age 44) Campbellsville, Kentucky, U.S.
- Height: 5 ft 11 in (1.80 m)
- Weight: 190 lb (86 kg; 14 st)

Career
- Sport: Golf
- College: University of Kentucky
- Turned professional: 2005
- Current tour: PGA Tour
- Professional wins: 8
- Highest ranking: 12 (April 5, 2015)

Number of wins by tour
- PGA Tour: 5
- Other: 3

Best results in major championships
- Masters Tournament: T4: 2016
- PGA Championship: T24/24th: 2010, 2015
- U.S. Open: 12th: 2017
- The Open Championship: 3rd: 2016

John Bradley "J.B." Holmes (born April 26, 1982) is an American professional golfer. He plays on the PGA Tour.

== Early life and amateur career ==
Holmes, born in Campbellsville, Kentucky, began to play on the varsity golf team at Taylor County High School in Campbellsville when he was in the third grade. He suffered a mild form of dyslexia when in school. Holmes's childhood friend, Brandon Parsons, is his caddy. While in high school he played on the Pepsi Junior Golf Tour.

Holmes attended the University of Kentucky in Lexington, helping to achieve SEC Title while there, and represented the United States in the 2005 Walker Cup before turning professional later that year.

== Professional career ==
Holmes was medalist at the 2005 PGA Tour Qualifying Tournament. He tied for tenth in his first PGA Tour start at the 2006 Sony Open in Hawaii and in February that year he won the FBR Open, making him the fastest golfer to reach $1,000,000 in career earnings on the PGA Tour. It was his fifth tournament as a professional and his fourth on the PGA Tour.

After this victory his form fell away, and this continued in 2007 when he made only 2 top ten finishes and ended the year in 118th place on the money list.

On February 3, 2008, Holmes won the FBR Open for the second Tour win of his career and also captured the tournament title for the second time in three years. Starting the final round with a four shot lead, on the 18th tee he was one shot behind Phil Mickelson. Holmes birdied the 18th to force a play-off and then defeated Mickelson on the first playoff hole (the 18th) by making a six-foot birdie putt after a 359-yard drive. This victory took Holmes to 62nd in the Official World Golf Ranking. In 2008, Holmes reached a career-high 42nd in the OWGR.

Holmes, along with fellow 2006 rookies such as Camilo Villegas and Bubba Watson, is known for hitting the ball long distances, in excess of 300 yards (312.7 yards, ranking him number 2 in driving distance, only 6 yards behind the leader, Watson). As such, he plays courses by routinely hitting his driver as far as he can, reminiscent of John Daly's "Grip it and Rip It" philosophy, and using his distance advantage to put him closer to the green and in position for a wedge or short iron to the green. While the style of play is not new, many critics have complained that J.B. Holmes's style has ushered in a new wave of golfers dedicated to smashing the ball as far as they can, assisted by the newer golf equipment offered by golf club companies and hacking the ball out of the rough onto the green, effectively eliminating the equalizing effect that the sport of golf usually affords shorter, accurate hitters.

In the 2008 Ryder Cup, Holmes defeated Europe's Søren Hansen 2&1 during Sunday's singles matches to bring the United States within one point of clinching the Ryder Cup. Jim Furyk would later defeat Miguel Ángel Jiménez on the 17th hole to clinch the Ryder Cup. Holmes and another Ryder Cup teammate, Kenny Perry, were named Kentuckians of the Year for 2008 by Kentucky Monthly magazine.

After shooting an 80 in the first round, Holmes withdrew from the 2011 PGA Championship in August. He had been dealing with vertigo symptoms for several months and eventually was diagnosed with structural defects in the cerebellum known as Chiari malformations. He underwent brain surgery on September 1, 2011, and about a month later, doctors discovered that Holmes was allergic to the adhesive used on the webbed titanium plate at the base of his skull. He was airlifted from his home in Kentucky to Johns Hopkins in Baltimore for another surgery. Holmes returned to the PGA Tour in late January 2012 at the Farmers Insurance Open.

After brain surgery, Holmes played in 26 events in 2012. Elbow and ankle injuries limited him to six PGA Tour events in 2013 and did not play again until the Dunlop Phoenix Tournament on the Japan Golf Tour. Holmes satisfied his medical extension through earnings at the 2014 Zurich Classic of New Orleans, finishing T11. He would need a T63 at the Wells Fargo Championship to earn entry into the 2014 Players Championship via FedEx Cup points. Holmes would get his first win in six years, regained his Tour status through the 2015–2016 season, and moved from 242nd to 68th in the Official World Golf Ranking. The win also earned Holmes entry into the 2014 PGA Championship at Valhalla Golf Club in Louisville, Kentucky.

In February 2015, Holmes lost in a four-man sudden-death playoff at the Farmers Insurance Open. He held a co-lead after the 54-hole stage with Harris English, but could only shoot a level-par final round to enter the playoff. At the first playoff hole, Holmes made a birdie to move on to the second playoff hole with Jason Day, after English and Scott Stallings were eliminated with pars. On the par-three second playoff hole, Holmes flew the green and could not get down in two from the back rough, leaving Day with two putts from 15 feet for the victory.

In the first round of the WGC-Cadillac Championship, Holmes shot a 62 for a total of 10-under-par to lead by four strokes after the first day. His round included eight birdies and an eagle to tie the tournament record. Holmes retained his lead after the second round, despite a one-over-par 73. He led by two shots going into the weekend and opened up a five-shot lead following a 70 in the third round, which included a hole-in-one at the par-3 fourth hole. However his lead had gone by the sixth hole in the final round, after he bogeyed three of his opening six holes. Holmes played the rest of his round in even-par and would go on to shoot a 75 to finish one behind winner Dustin Johnson. His runner-up finish moved Holmes to 19th in the world rankings, his highest ever placing to date.

In January 2018, Holmes was criticized by his fellow pros on social media after taking four minutes and ten seconds over his second shot to the 18th hole in the final round of the Farmers Insurance Open. Holmes needed an eagle to get into a playoff but eventually laid up. Holmes later said he was 'shocked' by the negative reaction to incident, comments that sparked another backlash. Fellow pro Justin Thomas defended Holmes though, saying he would have done exactly the same had he been in his position.

On February 17, 2019, Holmes won the Genesis Open, his fifth PGA Tour victory and first in nearly four years. Holmes overcame a four shot deficit in the final round to finish one stroke ahead of the 54-hole leader Justin Thomas, at the end of a marathon 34-hole final day. The pivotal moment occurring at the 13th hole during the final round, when Holmes holed a 12-foot par putt and Thomas missed two short putts, resulting in a double bogey.

Holmes shared the 36-hole lead at the 2019 Open Championship at Royal Portrush with Irishman Shane Lowry. Holmes shot opening rounds of 66-68 for an eight under total. However, he was unable to get it done on the weekend, shooting 69–87 to drop to a tie for 67th.

== Personal life ==
Holmes is married to the former Erica Kalbhin. The couple got married in 2013. The couple have a son who was born in 2017. Holmes is a Christian.

Holmes has a Goldendoodle service dog named Ace that helps him with his vertigo.

== Professional wins (8) ==
=== PGA Tour wins (5) ===
No.	Date	Tournament	Winning score	To par	Margin of victory	Runner(s)-up
1	Feb 5, 2006	FBR Open	68-64-65-66=263	−21	7 strokes	(United States) J. J. Henry, (United States) Steve Lowery, (United States) Ryan Palmer, (United States) Scott Verplank, (Colombia) Camilo Villegas
2	Feb 3, 2008	FBR Open (2)	68-65-66-71=270	−14	Playoff	(United States) Phil Mickelson
3	May 4, 2014	Wells Fargo Championship	70-67-66-71=274	−14	1 stroke	(United States) Jim Furyk
4	Apr 5, 2015	Shell Houston Open	65-70-73-64=272	−16	Playoff	(United States) Jordan Spieth, (United States) Johnson Wagner
5	Feb 17, 2019	Genesis Open	63-69-68-70=270	−14	1 stroke	(United States) Justin Thomas

PGA Tour playoff record (2–2)

No.	Year	Tournament	Opponent(s)	Result
1	2008	FBR Open	(United States) Phil Mickelson	Won with birdie on first extra hole
2	2009	Shell Houston Open	(England) Paul Casey	Lost to bogey on first extra hole
3	2015	Farmers Insurance Open	(Australia) Jason Day, (United States) Harris English, (United States) Scott Stallings	Day won with par on second extra hole English and Stallings eliminated by birdie on first hole
4	2015	Shell Houston Open	(United States) Jordan Spieth, (United States) Johnson Wagner	Won with par on second extra hole Spieth eliminated by par on first hole

=== Other wins (3) ===
- 2003 Kentucky Open (as an amateur)
- 2004 Kentucky Open (as an amateur)
- 2010 CVS Caremark Charity Classic (with Ricky Barnes)

== Results in major championships ==
Tournament	2003	2004	2005	2006	2007	2008	2009
Masters Tournament						T25	
U.S. Open	CUT			T48		CUT	T27
The Open Championship				CUT		CUT	69
PGA Championship				T37		T29	WD

Tournament	2010	2011	2012	2013	2014	2015	2016	2017	2018
Masters Tournament						CUT	T4	50	
U.S. Open					T17	T27	CUT	12	
The Open Championship	T14	CUT			CUT	CUT	3	T54	
PGA Championship	T24	WD			T64	24	CUT	T28	CUT

Tournament	2019	2020	2021	2022	2023	2024	2025	2026
Masters Tournament	T62							
PGA Championship	CUT							
U.S. Open	CUT							CUT
The Open Championship	T67	NT						

Top 10
Did not play

WD = Withdrew
CUT = missed the half-way cut
"T" = tied
NT = no tournament due to COVID-19 pandemic

=== Summary ===
Tournament	Wins	2nd	3rd	Top-5	Top-10	Top-25	Events	Cuts made
Masters Tournament	0	0	0	1	1	2	5	4
PGA Championship	0	0	0	0	0	2	11	6
U.S. Open	0	0	0	0	0	2	10	5
The Open Championship	0	0	1	1	1	2	10	5
Totals	0	0	1	2	2	8	36	20

- Most consecutive cuts made – 4 (2017 Masters – 2017 PGA)
- Longest streak of top-10s – 1 (twice)

== Results in The Players Championship ==
Tournament	2006	2007	2008	2009	2010	2011	2012	2013	2014	2015	2016	2017	2018	2019
The Players Championship	T38	T16	T10	CUT	T13	T6	CUT		CUT	T51	CUT	T41	CUT	CUT

Top 10
Did not play

CUT = missed the halfway cut
"T" indicates a tie for a place

== Results in World Golf Championships ==
Results not in chronological order before 2015.

Tournament	2006	2007	2008	2009	2010	2011	2012	2013	2014	2015	2016	2017	2018	2019
Championship			T40		T18					2	59	T12		
Match Play			R64			QF				T9	T28	T51		T17
Invitational	T50		T36	T36	T44				T26	T37	T27	T60		54
Champions									T28		T35			

Top 10
Did not play

QF, R16, R32, R64 = Round in which player lost in match play
"T" = tied
Note that the HSBC Champions did not become a WGC event until 2009.

== U.S. national team appearances ==
Amateur

- Palmer Cup: 2005 (winners)
- Walker Cup: 2005 (winners)

Professional

- Ryder Cup: 2008 (winners), 2016 (winners)
- Presidents Cup: 2015 (winners)

== See also ==
- 2005 PGA Tour Qualifying School graduates
