= 2017 U.S. Open (golf) =

Coordinates: 43.245°N 88.395°W

Tournament information
- Dates: June 15–18, 2017
- Location: Erin, Wisconsin
- Course: Erin Hills
- Organized by: USGA
- Tour(s): PGA Tour; European Tour; Japan Golf Tour

Statistics
- Par: 72
- Length: 7,741 yards (7,078 m)
- Field: 156 players, 68 after cut
- Cut: 145 (+1)
- Prize fund: $12,000,000 €10,745,944
- Winner's share: $2,160,000 €1,934,270

Champion
- (United States) Brooks Koepka
- 272 (−16)

Location in the United States
Location in Wisconsin

The 2017 U.S. Open Championship was the 117th U.S. Open, held June 15–18 at Erin Hills in Erin, Wisconsin, northwest of Milwaukee. Brooks Koepka claimed his first major title with a 16-under-par 272, four strokes ahead of runners-up Brian Harman and Hideki Matsuyama. Koepka's score matched the lowest ever at the championship, set in 2011 by Rory McIlroy.

This was the first U.S. Open in Wisconsin, but marked its fifth major, following four editions of the PGA Championship. The PGA was played in 1933 at Blue Mound in Wauwatosa, and at Whistling Straits near Kohler in 2004, 2010, and 2015.

The purse was a record for a major at $12 million, and the winner's share exceeded $2 million for the first time, at $2.16 million.

== Venue ==
This was the first U.S. Open at Erin Hills, which opened in 2006 and hosted the U.S. Amateur in 2011. It was also the first U.S. Open since 1992 at par 72.

It continued a long tradition of golf in the state, which hosted the U.S. Women's Open twice at Blackwolf Run in Kohler (1998, 2012), and the U.S. Senior Open at Whistling Straits in 2007. The PGA Tour formerly stopped in the state regularly with the Greater Milwaukee Open (1968–2009), preceded by the Milwaukee Open Invitational (1955–1961).

=== Course layout ===
Hole	1	2	3	4	5	6	7	8	9	Out	10	11	12	13	14	15	16	17	18	In	Total
Yards	608	338	508	439	505	208	607	492	135	3,840	504	460	464	193	594	357	183	509	637	3,901	7,741
Par	5	4	4	4	4	3	5	4	3	36	4	4	4	3	5	4	3	4	5	36	72

Yardages by round

Round	Hole	1	2	3	4	5	6	7	8	9	Out	10	11	12	13	14	15	16	17	18	In	Total
	Par	5	4	4	4	4	3	5	4	3	36	4	4	4	3	5	4	3	4	5	36	72
1	Yards	613	330	497	451	514	252	604	490	150	3,901	514	451	448	227	599	368	179	526	632	3,944	7,845
2	Yards	597	360	515	456	498	249	578	487	153	3,893	525	468	437	198	603	348	179	512	676	3,946	7,839
3	Yards	609	331	516	432	504	239	613	499	123	3,866	521	467	465	208	599	288	214	523	667	3,952	7,818
4	Yards	605	329	484	399	500	199	632	486	172	3,806	492	452	433	216	588	356	184	513	681	3,915	7,721

- Scoring average: 73.204
  - by round: 73.385, 73.225, 72.016, 73.928
- Most difficult holes in relation to par: 3, 4, 6, 17

== Field ==
About half the field consisted of players who were exempt from qualifying for the U.S. Open. Each player is classified according to the first category in which he qualified, and other categories are shown in parentheses.

1. Winners of the U.S. Open Championship during the last ten years

- Ángel Cabrera
- Lucas Glover
- Dustin Johnson (12,13,14,15)
- Martin Kaymer (14,15)
- Graeme McDowell
- Rory McIlroy (6,7,13,14,15)
- Justin Rose (11,14,15)
- Webb Simpson
- Jordan Spieth (5,13,14,15)
- Tiger Woods did not play.

2. Winner and runner-up of the 2016 U.S. Amateur Championship

- Brad Dalke (a)
- Curtis Luck forfeited his exemption by turning professional in April 2017.

3. Winner of the 2016 Amateur Championship

- Scott Gregory (a)

4. Winner of the 2016 Mark H. McCormack Medal (men's World Amateur Golf Ranking)

- Maverick McNealy (a)

5. Winners of the Masters Tournament during the last five years

- Sergio García (12,14,15)
- Adam Scott (13,14,15)
- Bubba Watson (13,14,15)
- Danny Willett (14,15)

6. Winners of The Open Championship during the last five years

- Ernie Els
- Zach Johnson (12)
- Henrik Stenson (14,15)
- Phil Mickelson (13,14,15) withdrew to attend his daughter's high school graduation.

7. Winners of the PGA Championship during the last five years

- Jason Day (8,12,13,14,15)
- Jason Dufner (12,13,15)
- Jimmy Walker (13,14,15)

8. Winners of The Players Championship during the last three years

- Rickie Fowler (14,15)
- Kim Si-woo (13,14,15)

9. Winner of the 2017 European Tour BMW PGA Championship

- Alex Norén (14,15)

10. Winner of the 2016 U.S. Senior Open Championship

- Gene Sauers

11. Winner of the 2016 Olympic Golf Tournament

12. The 10 lowest scorers and anyone tying for 10th place at the 2016 U.S. Open Championship

- Jim Furyk
- Branden Grace (14,15)
- Shane Lowry
- Kevin Na (13)
- Scott Piercy (14)
- Daniel Summerhays

13. Players who qualified for the season-ending 2016 Tour Championship

- Daniel Berger (14,15)
- Paul Casey (14,15)
- Roberto Castro
- Kevin Chappell (14,15)
- Emiliano Grillo (14,15)
- J. B. Holmes (14,15)
- Kevin Kisner (14,15)
- Russell Knox (14,15)
- Matt Kuchar (14,15)
- Hideki Matsuyama (14,15)
- William McGirt (14,15)
- Sean O'Hair
- Patrick Reed (14,15)
- Charl Schwartzel (14,15)
- Brandt Snedeker (14,15)
- Justin Thomas (14,15)
- Jhonattan Vegas
- Gary Woodland (14,15)
- Ryan Moore (14,15) withdrew due to a shoulder injury.

14. The top 60 point leaders and ties as of May 22, 2017 in the Official World Golf Ranking

- An Byeong-hun (15)
- Wesley Bryan (15)
- Rafa Cabrera-Bello (15)
- Ross Fisher (15)
- Matt Fitzpatrick (15)
- Tommy Fleetwood (15)
- Bill Haas (15)
- Adam Hadwin (15)
- Brian Harman (15)
- Tyrrell Hatton (15)
- Russell Henley (15)
- Charley Hoffman (15)
- Billy Horschel (15)
- Yuta Ikeda (15)
- Brooks Koepka (15)
- Marc Leishman (15)
- Francesco Molinari (15)
- Louis Oosthuizen (15)
- Pat Perez (15)
- Thomas Pieters (15)
- Jon Rahm (15)
- Brendan Steele (15)
- Hideto Tanihara (15)
- Wang Jeung-hun
- Lee Westwood (15)
- Bernd Wiesberger (15)

15. The top 60 point leaders and ties as of June 12, 2017 in the Official World Golf Ranking

- Chris Wood

16. Special exemptions given by the USGA

- None

The remaining contestants earned their places through sectional qualifiers.

- Japan: Shugo Imahira, Chan Kim (L), Satoshi Kodaira, Yūsaku Miyazato
- England: Thomas Aiken, Oliver Bekker, George Coetzee, Bradley Dredge, Paul Dunne, Andrew Johnston, Alexander Lévy, Li Haotong, Wade Ormsby, Eddie Pepperell, Aaron Rai, Richie Ramsay, Joël Stalter, Brandon Stone, Matt Wallace
- United States

- Newport Beach, California: Mason Andersen (a,L), Cameron Champ (a,L), Kevin Dougherty (L), Stewart Hagestad (a), John Oda (a), Sahith Theegala (a)
- Tequesta, Florida: Tyson Alexander (L), Jack Maguire (L), Joaquín Niemann (a)
- Ball Ground, Georgia: Stephan Jäger, Alex Smalley (a,L)
- Rockville, Maryland: Ben Kohles, Sam Ryder, Kyle Thompson
- Summit, New Jersey: Matt Campbell (L), Daniel Chopra, Chris Crawford (a,L), Scott Harvey (a), Andy Pope (L)
- Columbus, Ohio: Keegan Bradley, Bud Cauley, Stewart Cink, Bryson DeChambeau, Talor Gooch, Jason Kokrak, Martin Laird, David Lingmerth, Jamie Lovemark, Pan Cheng-tsung, J. T. Poston, Ted Potter Jr., Scottie Scheffler (a), Peter Uihlein
- Springfield, Ohio: Ryan Brehm, Corey Conners (L), Brice Garnett, Brian Stuard
- Memphis, Tennessee: Harris English, Troy Merritt, Trey Mullinax, Garrett Osborn (L), Jonathan Randolph, Chez Reavie, Andrés Romero, Xander Schauffele, Steve Stricker
- Dallas, Texas: Nick Flanagan (L), Walker Lee (a,L), Roman Robledo (L)
- Lakewood, Washington: Derek Barron (L), Max Greyserman (L), Daniel Miernicki (L), Jordan Niebrugge (L)

Alternates who gained entry:

- Michael Putnam (Columbus) – replaced Ryan Moore
- Grégory Bourdy (England) – claimed spot held for category 15
- Kim Meen-whee (Memphis) – claimed spot held for category 15
- Tyler Light (L, Springfield) – claimed spot held for category 15
- Dru Love (L, Ball Ground) – claimed spot held for category 15
- Ryan Palmer (Dallas) – claimed spot held for category 15
- Roberto Díaz (Summit) – replaced Phil Mickelson

(a) denotes amateur
(L) denotes player advanced through local qualifying

== Round summaries ==
=== First round ===
Thursday, June 15, 2017

Rickie Fowler tied the U.S. Open record for lowest first round score in relation to par, shooting a bogey-free round of 65 (−7) for a one-shot lead over Paul Casey and Xander Schauffele. The course played easily, yielding 44 under-par rounds. Despite this, many of the pre-tournament favorites faltered. Jordan Spieth played solidly, but stumbled late for an opening 73 (+1). World number one Dustin Johnson was derailed by a double bogey on the par-5 14th, shooting a 3-over 75. Jon Rahm, Rory McIlroy, and Jason Day were even worse, shooting 76 (+4), 78 (+6), and 79 (+7), respectively. Meanwhile, Canadian Adam Hadwin tied a U.S. Open record with six straight birdies, en route to shooting four under par. This was the first major in which neither Phil Mickelson or Tiger Woods competed, in 23 years. The scoring average was 73.385 (+1.385).

Place	Player	Score	To par
1	(United States) Rickie Fowler	65	−7
T2	(England) Paul Casey	66	−6
T2	(United States) Xander Schauffele	66	−6
T4	(England) Tommy Fleetwood	67	−5
T4	(United States) Brian Harman	67	−5
T4	(United States) Brooks Koepka	67	−5
T7	(Canada) Adam Hadwin	68	−4
T7	(Australia) Marc Leishman	68	−4
T7	(United States) Kevin Na	68	−4
T7	(United States) Patrick Reed	68	−4

=== Second round ===
Friday, June 16, 2017

Four players finished atop the leadership after the second round for the first time since 1974. Paul Casey was four-over on his round before recording five straight birdies from holes 17–3 to shoot 71 (−1). Brooks Koepka made four birdies on his front-nine to get to nine-under but fell back with two bogeys on the back-nine. They were joined at the top of the leaderboard by Tommy Fleetwood and Brian Harman, who each shot 70 (−2). First round leader Rickie Fowler also got as low as nine-under before three straight bogeys saw him fall a shot behind the leaders. Hideki Matsuyama and Chez Reavie had the low round of the day with a 65 (−7); combined with Fowler's opening round, it is the first time in U.S. Open history that three players shot a round of 65 in the same tournament. Forty-two players were under-par after 36 holes, a new tournament record. The scoring average was 73.225 (+1.225).

For the first time since the introduction of the Official World Golf Ranking in 1986, the top three ranked players (Dustin Johnson, Rory McIlroy, and Jason Day) all missed the cut in a major championship.

Place	Player	Score	To par
T1	(England) Paul Casey	66-71=137	−7
T1	(England) Tommy Fleetwood	67-70=137	−7
T1	(United States) Brian Harman	67-70=137	−7
T1	(United States) Brooks Koepka	67-70=137	−7
T5	(United States) Rickie Fowler	65-73=138	−6
T5	(United States) J. B. Holmes	69-69=138	−6
T5	(United States) Jamie Lovemark	69-69=138	−6
T8	(United States) Cameron Champ (a)	70-69=139	−5
T8	(South Korea) Kim Si-woo	69-70=139	−5
T8	(Japan) Hideki Matsuyama	74-65=139	−5
T8	(United States) Xander Schauffele	66-73=139	−5
T8	(United States) Brandt Snedeker	70-69=139	−5

Amateurs: Champ (−5), Scheffler (−1), Andersen (+2), McNealy (+3), Smalley (+3), Gregory (+4), Niemann (+5), Crawford (+6), Dalke (+6), Hagestad (+8), Theegala (+8), Harvey (+10), Oda (+10), Lee (+20)

=== Third round ===
Saturday, June 17, 2017

Overnight rains and calm conditions during the day led to numerous low scores. Brian Harman birdied three holes on the back-nine to post a score of 67 (−5) and take a one-shot lead over Tommy Fleetwood, Brooks Koepka, and Justin Thomas. Thomas began the round in a tie for 24th before a historic round put him into contention. An eagle on the 18th gave Thomas a score of 63 (−9), tying the major championship record. At nine-under, he set the U.S. Open record for lowest score in relation to par, breaking the mark set by Johnny Miller in 1973. Fleetwood held possession of the lead before a bogey at the par-5 18th saw him finish a shot behind Harman, while Koepka birdied the last to also get to within a stroke. Rickie Fowler recovered from a bogey at the 13th with three straight birdies on holes 14-16 and was two back. Paul Casey began the round tied for the lead but shot a three-over 75 and dropped to 17th.

Five golfers were at 10-under-par or better entering the final round. Before this year, only six golfers had ever reached double digits under par at any point in a U.S. Open. The scoring average was 72.036 (+0.036).

Place	Player	Score	To par
1	(United States) Brian Harman	67-70-67=204	−12
T2	(England) Tommy Fleetwood	67-70-68=205	−11
T2	(United States) Brooks Koepka	67-70-68=205	−11
T2	(United States) Justin Thomas	73-69-63=205	−11
5	(United States) Rickie Fowler	65-73-68=206	−10
6	(South Korea) Kim Si-woo	69-70-68=207	−9
T7	(United States) Russell Henley	71-70-67=208	−8
T7	(United States) Charley Hoffman	70-70-68=208	−8
T7	(United States) Patrick Reed	68-75-65=208	−8
T10	(United States) Bill Haas	72-68-69=209	−7
T10	(United States) Xander Schauffele	66-73-70=209	−7
T10	(United States) Brandt Snedeker	70-69-70=209	−7
T10	(United States) Brendan Steele	71-69-69=209	−7

Amateurs: Champ (−4), Scheffler (−2)

==== Justin Thomas scorecard ====
Hole	1	2	3	4	5	6	7	8	9	10	11	12	13	14	15	16	17	18
Par	5	4	4	4	4	3	5	4	3	4	4	4	3	5	4	3	4	5
(United States) Thomas	−1	−2	−2	−1	−2	−2	−3	−4	−5	−4	−4	−5	−5	−5	−6	−6	−7	−9

Eagle	Birdie	Bogey

=== Final round ===
Sunday, June 18, 2017

==== Summary ====
Brooks Koepka tied the U.S. Open scoring record and won his first career major championship by four strokes over Brian Harman and Hideki Matsuyama. Beginning the round a shot out of the lead, Koepka quickly erased the deficit with birdies on his first two holes. After saving par with an eight-foot putt on the 13th, he then recorded three straight birdies on his way to a round of 67 (−5). His total of 16-under par tied the tournament scoring record set by Rory McIlroy in 2011. Harman entered the round with the lead but fell into a tie for second with three bogeys on the back-nine. Matsuyama shot the low round of the day with 66 (−6) and jumped into a tie with Harman. After establishing a new tournament scoring record in the third round, Justin Thomas bogeyed three of his first five holes and finished three-over on the round to drop to a tie for ninth. Tommy Fleetwood also began the round a shot behind but three bogeys on the front-nine dropped him from contention. The low amateur was Scottie Scheffler, who finished at –1, beating Cameron Champ by just one stroke. In all, thirty-one players finished the tournament under par, breaking the U.S. Open record set in 1990.

==== Final leaderboard ====
Champion
Silver Cup winner (leading amateur)
(a) = amateur
(c) = past champion

Place	Player	Score	To par	Money ($)
1	(United States) Brooks Koepka	67-70-68-67=272	−16	2,160,000
T2	(United States) Brian Harman	67-70-67-72=276	−12	1,052,012
T2	(Japan) Hideki Matsuyama	74-65-71-66=276	−12	1,052,012
4	(England) Tommy Fleetwood	67-70-68-72=277	−11	563,642
T5	(United States) Rickie Fowler	65-73-68-72=278	−10	420,334
T5	(United States) Bill Haas	72-68-69-69=278	−10	420,334
T5	(United States) Xander Schauffele	66-73-70-69=278	−10	420,334
8	(United States) Charley Hoffman	70-70-68-71=279	−9	336,106
T9	(United States) Trey Mullinax	71-72-69-68=280	−8	279,524
T9	(United States) Brandt Snedeker	70-69-70-71=280	−8	279,524
T9	(United States) Justin Thomas	73-69-63-75=280	−8	279,524

Leaderboard below the top 10
Place	Player	Score	To par	Money ($)
12	(United States) J. B. Holmes	69-69-72-71=281	−7	235,757
T13	(South Korea) Kim Si-woo	69-70-68-75=282	−6	203,557
T13	(United States) Patrick Reed	68-75-65-74=282	−6	203,557
T13	(United States) Brendan Steele	71-69-69-73=282	−6	203,557
T16	(United States) Matt Kuchar	74-71-70-68=283	−5	156,809
T16	(England) Eddie Pepperell	72-71-69-71=283	−5	156,809
T16	(United States) Chez Reavie	75-65-72-71=283	−5	156,809
T16	(United States) Steve Stricker	73-72-69-69=283	−5	156,809
T16	(Austria) Bernd Wiesberger	69-72-69-73=283	−5	156,809
T21	(Spain) Sergio García	70-71-71-72=284	−4	124,951
T21	(Sweden) David Lingmerth	73-69-71-71=284	−4	124,951
T23	(United States) Kevin Chappell	74-70-70-71=285	−3	105,506
T23	(United States) Jim Furyk (c)	70-74-69-72=285	−3	105,506
T23	(South Africa) Louis Oosthuizen	74-70-68-73=285	−3	105,506
26	(England) Paul Casey	66-71-75-74=286	−2	93,094
T27	(United States) Russell Henley	71-70-67-79=287	−1	83,331
T27	(United States) Zach Johnson	71-74-68-74=287	−1	83,331
T27	(Australia) Marc Leishman	68-72-72-75=287	−1	83,331
T27	(United States) Jamie Lovemark	69-69-74-75=287	−1	83,331
T27	(United States) Scottie Scheffler (a)	69-74-71-73=287	−1	0
T32	(United States) Cameron Champ (a)	70-69-73-76=288	E	0
T32	(Scotland) Martin Laird	72-71-72-73=288	E	72,420
T32	(United States) Kevin Na	68-76-73-71=288	E	72,420
T35	(England) Matt Fitzpatrick	70-73-70-76=289	+1	58,637
T35	(Germany) Martin Kaymer (c)	72-69-75-73=289	+1	58,637
T35	(United States) Jordan Niebrugge	73-72-73-71=289	+1	58,637
T35	(United States) Michael Putnam	73-70-71-75=289	+1	58,637
T35	(United States) Webb Simpson (c)	74-71-71-73=289	+1	58,637
T35	(United States) Jordan Spieth (c)	73-71-76-69=289	+1	58,637
T35	(South Africa) Brandon Stone	70-74-72-73=289	+1	58,637
T42	(Spain) Rafa Cabrera-Bello	72-73-71-74=290	+2	44,975
T42	(England) Andrew Johnston	69-73-73-75=290	+2	44,975
T42	(United States) Jack Maguire	70-73-71-76=290	+2	44,975
T42	(United States) Jonathan Randolph	71-71-73-75=290	+2	44,975
T46	(United States) Stewart Cink	74-70-76-71=291	+3	35,484
T46	(United States) Harris English	71-69-75-76=291	+3	35,484
T46	(Japan) Satoshi Kodaira	73-69-73-76=291	+3	35,484
T46	(Republic of Ireland) Shane Lowry	71-74-73-73=291	+3	35,484
T50	(South Africa) Branden Grace	72-72-71-77=292	+4	28,895
T50	(South Korea) Kim Meen-whee	73-70-72-77=292	+4	28,895
T50	(United States) Gary Woodland	72-73-73-74=292	+4	28,895
T53	(United States) Ryan Brehm	71-74-72-77=294	+6	26,659
T53	(United States) Jason Kokrak	75-70-74-75=294	+6	26,659
T55	(South Africa) Ernie Els (c)	70-72-79-74=295	+7	25,631
T55	(United States) William McGirt	70-71-79-75=295	+7	25,631
T55	(England) Lee Westwood	69-75-75-76=295	+7	25,631
T58	(South Africa) Thomas Aiken	71-71-75-79=296	+8	25,026
T58	(United States) Kevin Kisner	74-70-76-76=296	+8	25,026
T60	(United States) Keegan Bradley	72-73-75-77=297	+9	24,301
T60	(Canada) Adam Hadwin	68-74-75-80=297	+9	24,301
T60	(Germany) Stephan Jäger	71-73-74-79=297	+9	24,301
T60	(Japan) Yūsaku Miyazato	72-70-76-79=297	+9	24,301
64	(United States) Kevin Dougherty	71-72-80-75=298	+10	23,696
65	(United States) Daniel Summerhays	73-72-74-81=300	+12	23,454
66	(United States) Talor Gooch	74-71-76-80=301	+13	23,213
67	(United States) Tyler Light	73-72-78-80=303	+15	22,971
68	(China) Li Haotong	74-70-82-84=310	+22	22,722
CUT	(United States) Mason Andersen (a)	73-73=146	+2	
CUT	(England) Ross Fisher	75-71=146	+2	
CUT	(United States) Lucas Glover (c)	74-72=146	+2	
CUT	(Japan) Yuta Ikeda	72-74=146	+2	
CUT	(United States) Dru Love	71-75=146	+2	
CUT	(United States) Pat Perez	76-70=146	+2	
CUT	(Scotland) Richie Ramsay	73-73=146	+2	
CUT	(England) Justin Rose (c)	72-74=146	+2	
CUT	(United States) Kyle Thompson	76-70=146	+2	
CUT	(United States) Peter Uihlein	74-72=146	+2	
CUT	(South Korea) An Byeong-hun	71-76=147	+3	
CUT	(Wales) Bradley Dredge	74-73=147	+3	
CUT	(United States) Maverick McNealy (a)	73-74=147	+3	
CUT	(United States) Daniel Miernicki	73-74=147	+3	
CUT	(Italy) Francesco Molinari	74-73=147	+3	
CUT	(United States) Ryan Palmer	78-69=147	+3	
CUT	(Taiwan) Pan Cheng-tsung	73-74=147	+3	
CUT	(Belgium) Thomas Pieters	76-71=147	+3	
CUT	(South Africa) Charl Schwartzel	71-76=147	+3	
CUT	(Australia) Adam Scott	72-75=147	+3	
CUT	(United States) Alex Smalley (a)	73-74=147	+3	
CUT	(Sweden) Henrik Stenson	74-73=147	+3	
CUT	(England) Chris Wood	73-74=147	+3	
CUT	(United States) Tyson Alexander	71-77=148	+4	
CUT	(United States) Bud Cauley	73-75=148	+4	
CUT	(Mexico) Roberto Díaz	72-76=148	+4	
CUT	(Republic of Ireland) Paul Dunne	75-73=148	+4	
CUT	(England) Scott Gregory (a)	75-73=148	+4	
CUT	(England) Tyrrell Hatton	76-72=148	+4	
CUT	(United States) Dustin Johnson (c)	75-73=148	+4	
CUT	(United States) Troy Merritt	74-74=148	+4	
CUT	(Japan) Hideto Tanihara	72-76=148	+4	
CUT	(United States) Bubba Watson	75-73=148	+4	
CUT	(France) Grégory Bourdy	77-72=149	+5	
CUT	(Argentina) Ángel Cabrera (c)	71-78=149	+5	
CUT	(United States) Max Greyserman	76-73=149	+5	
CUT	(Japan) Shugo Imahira	76-73=149	+5	
CUT	(Scotland) Russell Knox	73-76=149	+5	
CUT	(Northern Ireland) Graeme McDowell (c)	76-73=149	+5	
CUT	(Northern Ireland) Rory McIlroy (c)	78-71=149	+5	
CUT	(Chile) Joaquín Niemann (a)	74-75=149	+5	
CUT	(United States) Sean O'Hair	76-73=149	+5	
CUT	(Spain) Jon Rahm	76-73=149	+5	
CUT	(United States) Sam Ryder	76-73=149	+5	
CUT	(France) Joël Stalter	77-72=149	+5	
CUT	(South Korea) Wang Jeung-hun	76-73=149	+5	
CUT	(United States) Chris Crawford (a)	75-75=150	+6	
CUT	(United States) Brad Dalke (a)	78-72=150	+6	
CUT	(United States) Bryson DeChambeau	74-76=150	+6	
CUT	(United States) Brice Garnett	75-75=150	+6	
CUT	(United States) Chan Kim	74-76=150	+6	
CUT	(Sweden) Alex Norén	73-77=150	+6	
CUT	(Australia) Wade Ormsby	75-75=150	+6	
CUT	(United States) Scott Piercy	72-78=150	+6	
CUT	(United States) J. T. Poston	78-72=150	+6	
CUT	(United States) Ted Potter Jr.	74-76=150	+6	
CUT	(Argentina) Andrés Romero	74-76=150	+6	
CUT	(United States) Jimmy Walker	77-73=150	+6	
CUT	(South Africa) Oliver Bekker	75-76=151	+7	
CUT	(South Africa) George Coetzee	72-79=151	+7	
CUT	(United States) Jason Dufner	76-75=151	+7	
CUT	(United States) Ben Kohles	77-74=151	+7	
CUT	(England) Matt Wallace	76-75=151	+7	
CUT	(United States) Roberto Castro	76-76=152	+8	
CUT	(Canada) Corey Conners	76-76=152	+8	
CUT	(Argentina) Emiliano Grillo	76-76=152	+8	
CUT	(United States) Stewart Hagestad (a)	77-75=152	+8	
CUT	(France) Alexander Lévy	77-75=152	+8	
CUT	(United States) Andy Pope	77-75=152	+8	
CUT	(United States) Sahith Theegala (a)	77-75=152	+8	
CUT	(Venezuela) Jhonattan Vegas	77-75=152	+8	
CUT	(United States) Derek Barron	70-83=153	+9	
CUT	(United States) Daniel Berger	78-75=153	+9	
CUT	(England) Aaron Rai	73-80=153	+9	
CUT	(United States) Gene Sauers	77-76=153	+9	
CUT	(Australia) Jason Day	79-75=154	+10	
CUT	(Australia) Nick Flanagan	75-79=154	+10	
CUT	(United States) Scott Harvey (a)	78-76=154	+10	
CUT	(United States) John Oda (a)	78-76=154	+10	
CUT	(United States) Garrett Osborn	83-71=154	+10	
CUT	(United States) Brian Stuard	81-75=156	+12	
CUT	(Sweden) Daniel Chopra	77-80=157	+13	
CUT	(United States) Billy Horschel	79-78=157	+13	
CUT	(United States) Roman Robledo	78-79=157	+13	
CUT	(United States) Matt Campbell	77-81=158	+14	
CUT	(United States) Wesley Bryan	76-83=159	+15	
CUT	(United States) Walker Lee (a)	81-83=164	+20	
WD	(England) Danny Willett	81	+9	

==== Scorecard ====
Final round

Hole	1	2	3	4	5	6	7	8	9	10	11	12	13	14	15	16	17	18
Par	5	4	4	4	4	3	5	4	3	4	4	4	3	5	4	3	4	5
(United States) Koepka	−12	−13	−13	−13	−13	−13	−13	−14	−14	−13	−13	−13	−13	−14	−15	−16	−16	−16
(United States) Harman	−12	−12	−13	−13	−13	−13	−13	−13	−13	−13	−13	−12	−11	−12	−12	−13	−13	−12
(Japan) Matsuyama	−7	−7	−7	−8	−9	−8	−8	−8	−8	−8	−9	−10	−10	−11	−10	−11	−11	−12
(England) Fleetwood	−11	−12	−11	−11	−11	−10	−10	−9	−10	−10	−10	−10	−10	−11	−11	−11	−11	−11
(United States) Fowler	−11	−11	−11	−11	−10	−10	−11	−11	−11	−11	−11	−10	−10	−10	−9	−9	−9	−10
(United States) Haas	−7	−8	−7	−7	−7	−7	−7	−7	−7	−7	−8	−8	−8	−8	−8	−9	−9	−10
(United States) Schauffele	−7	−8	−8	−7	−8	−8	−8	−8	−8	−8	−7	−7	−7	−8	−9	−9	−9	−10
(United States) Thomas	−11	−10	−10	−9	−8	−8	−8	−8	−8	−9	−9	−9	−8	−8	−8	−8	−8	−8

Cumulative tournament scores, relative to par

Birdie	Bogey
