= 2016 U.S. Open (golf) =

Tournament information
- Dates: June 16–19, 2016
- Location: Oakmont, Pennsylvania; 40.526°N 79.827°W
- Course: Oakmont Country Club
- Organized by: USGA
- Tours: PGA Tour; European Tour; Japan Golf Tour

Statistics
- Par: 70
- Length: 7,254 yards (6,633 m)
- Field: 156 players, 67 after cut
- Cut: 146 (+6)
- Prize fund: $10,000,000 €8,866,033
- Winner's share: $1,800,000 €1,595,886

Champion
- (United States) Dustin Johnson
- 276 (−4)

Location map
- Location in the United States Location in Pennsylvania

The 2016 United States Open Championship was the 116th U.S. Open, held June 16–19 at Oakmont Country Club in Oakmont and Plum, Pennsylvania, suburbs northeast of Pittsburgh. Dustin Johnson won his first major championship.

Play was delayed on the first day due to heavy rainfall, forcing most of the field to play half a round behind schedule. Andrew Landry was a surprise leader after the first round before Johnson led the field in the second. Shane Lowry carded a 65 in the third round to take the overall lead into the final round. Despite a controversial penalty on the 5th green, Johnson took the title three strokes ahead of runners-up Lowry, Jim Furyk and Scott Piercy.

== Venue ==
This was the ninth U.S. Open at Oakmont and its twelfth major championship.

=== Course layout ===
Hole	1	2	3	4	5	6	7	8	9	Out	10	11	12	13	14	15	16	17	18	In	Total
Yards	482	340	426	609	382	194	479	288	477	3,677	462	379	667	183	358	500	231	313	484	3,577	7,254
Par	4	4	4	5	4	3	4	3	4	35	4	4	5	3	4	4	3	4	4	35	70

Lengths of the course for previous major championships:

- 7,230 yards (6,611 m), par 70 - 2007 U.S. Open
- 6,946 yards (6,351 m), par 71 - 1994 U.S. Open
- 6,972 yards (6,375 m), par 71 - 1983 U.S. Open
- 6,989 yards (6,391 m), par 71 - 1978 PGA Championship
- 6,921 yards (6,329 m), par 71 - 1973 U.S. Open
- 6,894 yards (6,304 m), par 71 - 1962 U.S. Open
- 6,916 yards (6,324 m), par 72 - 1953 U.S. Open
- 6,882 yards (6,293 m), par 72 - 1951 PGA Championship
- 6,981 yards (6,383 m), par 72 - 1935 U.S. Open
- 6,965 yards (6,369 m), par 72 - 1927 U.S. Open
- 6,707 yards (6,133 m), par 74 - 1922 PGA Championship

Through 1994, the 9th hole was a par 5; before 1962, the 1st hole was also a par 5.

2016 yardages by round

Round	Hole	1	2	3	4	5	6	7	8	9	Out	10	11	12	13	14	15	16	17	18	In	Total
	Par	4	4	4	5	4	3	4	3	4	35	4	4	5	3	4	4	3	4	4	35	70
1	Yards	481	353	429	615	390	206	488	258	482	3,702	442	390	684	191	331	519	234	307	484	3,582	7,284
2	Yards	491	337	432	619	384	185	483	281	468	3,680	466	379	617	164	355	503	225	318	472	3,499	7,179
3	Yards	482	351	420	600	393	198	477	247	487	3,655	432	378	674	164	368	481	227	295	496	3,515	7,170
4	Yards	485	320	433	611	373	197	490	299	488	3,696	472	373	618	183	368	479	239	312	489	3,533	7,229

- Scoring average: 73.5697
  - by round: 74.2436, 73.6037, 72.0298, 73.4630
- Most difficult holes in relation to par: 1, 9, 15, 10

== Field ==
About half the field consisted of players who were exempt from qualifying for the U.S. Open. Each player is classified according to the first category in which he qualified, and other categories are shown in parentheses.

1. Winners of the U.S. Open Championship during the last ten years

- Ángel Cabrera
- Lucas Glover
- Martin Kaymer (8,13,14)
- Graeme McDowell
- Rory McIlroy (6,7,11,12,13,14)
- Geoff Ogilvy
- Justin Rose (12,13,14)
- Webb Simpson
- Jordan Spieth (5,11,12,13,14)
- Tiger Woods did not play.

2. Winner and runner-up of the 2015 U.S. Amateur Championship

- Derek Bard (a)
- Bryson DeChambeau forfeited his exemption by turning professional in April 2016 but subsequently earned a spot through sectional qualifying.

3. Winner of the 2015 Amateur Championship

- Romain Langasque forfeited his exemption by turning professional in April 2016.

4. Winner of the 2015 Mark H. McCormack Medal (men's World Amateur Golf Ranking)

- Jon Rahm (a)

5. Winners of the Masters Tournament during the last five years

- Adam Scott (11,13,14)
- Bubba Watson (12,13,14)
- Danny Willett (13,14)

6. Winners of The Open Championship during the last five years

- Ernie Els
- Zach Johnson (12,13,14)
- Phil Mickelson (13,14)
- Darren Clarke did not play.

7. Winners of the PGA Championship during the last five years

- Keegan Bradley
- Jason Day (8,11,12,13,14)
- Jason Dufner (14)

8. Winners of The Players Championship during the last three years

- Rickie Fowler (12,13,14)

9. Winner of the 2016 European Tour BMW PGA Championship

- Chris Wood (13,14)

10. Winner of the 2015 U.S. Senior Open Championship

- Jeff Maggert

11. The 10 lowest scorers and anyone tying for 10th place at the 2015 U.S. Open Championship

- Branden Grace (13,14)
- Dustin Johnson (12,13,14)
- Shane Lowry (13,14)
- Louis Oosthuizen (12,13,14)
- Charl Schwartzel (13,14)
- Cameron Smith
- Brandt Snedeker (12,13,14)

12. Players who qualified for the season-ending 2015 Tour Championship

- Daniel Berger (13,14)
- Steven Bowditch
- Paul Casey (13,14)
- Harris English (14)
- Jim Furyk (13,14)
- Bill Haas (13,14)
- Charley Hoffman (13,14)
- J. B. Holmes (13,14)
- Kevin Kisner (13,14)
- Brooks Koepka (13,14)
- Matt Kuchar (13,14)
- Danny Lee (13,14)
- Hideki Matsuyama (13,14)
- Kevin Na (13,14)
- Scott Piercy (13)
- Patrick Reed (13,14)
- Henrik Stenson (13,14)
- Robert Streb
- Jimmy Walker (13,14)
- Bae Sang-moon was unable to compete due to a military obligation in South Korea.

13. The top 60 point leaders and ties as of May 23, 2016 in the Official World Golf Ranking

- An Byeong-hun (14)
- Kiradech Aphibarnrat (14)
- Rafa Cabrera-Bello (14)
- Kevin Chappell (14)
- Jamie Donaldson
- Matt Fitzpatrick (14)
- Sergio García (14)
- Emiliano Grillo (14)
- James Hahn (14)
- Billy Horschel (14)
- Smylie Kaufman (14)
- Kim Kyung-tae (14)
- Chris Kirk (14)
- Patton Kizzire
- Søren Kjeldsen (14)
- Russell Knox (14)
- Anirban Lahiri (14)
- Marc Leishman (14)
- David Lingmerth (14)
- Ryan Moore (14)
- Andy Sullivan (14)
- Justin Thomas (14)
- Jaco van Zyl (14)
- Lee Westwood (14)
- Bernd Wiesberger (14)
- Thongchai Jaidee (14) did not play.

14. The top 60 point leaders and ties as of June 13, 2016 in the Official World Golf Ranking

- William McGirt

15. Special exemptions given by the USGA

- Retief Goosen

The remaining contestants earned their places through sectional qualifiers.

- Japan: Yuta Ikeda, Yūsaku Miyazato, Toru Taniguchi, Hideto Tanihara
- England: Matthew Baldwin, Grégory Bourdy, Søren Hansen, Peter Hanson, Andrew Johnston, Maximilian Kieffer, Mikael Lundberg, Matteo Manassero, Alex Norén, Lee Slattery, Sebastian Söderberg, Gary Stal, Romain Wattel
- United States

- Daly City, California: Mark Anguiano (L), Brandon Harkins (L), Gregor Main (L), Justin Suh (a,L), Tyler Raber (L), Miguel Tabuena
- Jacksonville, Florida: Matt Borchert (L), Sam Horsfield (a), Aron Price, Tim Wilkinson
- Roswell, Georgia: Frank Adams III (L), Kent Bulle, Ryan Stachler (a,L)
- Rockville, Maryland: Billy Hurley III, Denny McCarthy, Chase Parker (L)
- Summit, New Jersey: Chris Crawford (a,L), Jim Herman, Justin Hicks, Michael Miller (L), Rob Oppenheim, Andy Pope
- Powell, Ohio: Jason Allred (L), Bryson DeChambeau, Luke Donald, Jason Kokrak, Spencer Levin, Carlos Ortiz, Patrick Rodgers, Scottie Scheffler (a), Richie Schembechler (L), Wes Short Jr. (L), Brendan Steele, Kevin Streelman, Ethan Tracy (L)
- Springfield, Ohio: Charlie Danielson (a), Nick Hardy (a), Kyle Mueller (a,L), Patrick Wilkes-Krier (L)
- Memphis, Tennessee: Sam Burns (a,L), Derek Fathauer, Andres Gonzales, J. J. Henry, Tom Hoge, Kang Sung-hoon, Andrew Landry (L), Dicky Pride, David Toms, D. J. Trahan
- Houston, Texas: Derek Chang (L), Austin Jordan (L), Kevin Tway
- Vancouver, Washington: T. J. Howe (L), Matt Marshall (L), Aaron Wise (L)

Alternates who gained entry:

- Thitiphun Chuayprakong (Japan) – replaced Tiger Woods
- Jeev Milkha Singh (England) – replaced Thongchai Jaidee
- Thomas Aiken (Memphis) – replaced Darren Clarke
- Zach Edmondson (L, Jacksonville) – claimed spot held for category 14
- Tony Finau (Springfield) – claimed spot held for category 14
- Kevin Foley (L, Summit) – claimed spot held for category 14
- Daniel Summerhays (Powell) – claimed spot held for category 14
- Mike Van Sickle (L, Rockville) – claimed spot held for category 14

(a) denotes amateur
(L) denotes player advanced through local qualifying

== Round summaries ==
=== First round ===
Thursday, June 16, 2016

Play was suspended three times during the morning wave of players, all for dangerous weather conditions. At 4:40 pm EDT, play was called for the day with the second wave of players yet to tee off. Only three groups, nine players, finished their first rounds. Andrew Landry, who was ranked 624th in the world and had to go through local and sectional qualifiers, was the leader at 3 under par, with a birdie putt on his last hole, hole 9. Amateur Scottie Scheffler was the leader in the clubhouse at 1 under par.

Place	Player	Score/Hole	To par
1	(United States) Andrew Landry	17*	−3
T2	(United States) Bubba Watson	14	−2
T2	(New Zealand) Danny Lee	13	−2
T4	(United States) Scottie Scheffler (a)	69	−1
T4	(United States) Kevin Streelman	16*	−1
T4	(England) Lee Westwood	13*	−1
T4	(United States) Harris English	12*	−1

*Started on hole 10

Friday, June 17, 2016

After more rain overnight, nearly three inches (7.5 cm) total since Wednesday, play resumed at 7:30 am under mostly sunny skies and the round was completed shortly after 3 pm. Landry, the overnight leader, had a cushy end to his round: he only brought his putter to the course, to which he sank his birdie putt to lead at 4-under par. He would not play another hole for the rest of the day (see round 2).

Place	Player	Score	To par
1	(United States) Andrew Landry	66	−4
T2	(United States) Dustin Johnson	67	−3
T2	(England) Lee Westwood	67	−3
T4	(Spain) Sergio García	68	−2
T4	(Republic of Ireland) Shane Lowry	68	−2
T4	(United States) Scott Piercy	68	−2
T7	(New Zealand) Danny Lee	69	−1
T7	(United States) Scottie Scheffler (a)	69	−1
T7	(Sweden) Henrik Stenson	69	−1
T7	(United States) Kevin Streelman	69	−1
T7	(United States) Bubba Watson	69	−1

=== Second round ===
Friday, June 17, 2016

Play was suspended due to darkness at 8:43 pm with 27 players of the first wave still on the course and the second wave of players yet to tee off. Dustin Johnson completed his round and was tied for the lead with Andrew Landry, who had not started his second round yet, at 4 under par.

Place	Player	Score	To Par
T1	(United States) Andrew Landry	66*	−4
T1	(United States) Dustin Johnson	67-69=136	−4
3	(England) Lee Westwood	67*	−3
T4	(Republic of Ireland) Shane Lowry	68*	−2
T4	(Spain) Sergio García	68-70=138	−2
T4	(United States) Scott Piercy	68-70=138	−2

*Completed their second round on Saturday (had not yet started second round)

Saturday, June 18, 2016

The 27 members of the first wave resumed their rounds and the second wave began theirs at 7 am. The second round was completed after 2 pm; 67 players made the cut at 146 (+6) or better.

Place	Player	Score	To par
1	(United States) Dustin Johnson	67-69=136	−4
2	(United States) Andrew Landry	66-71=137	−3
T3	(France) Grégory Bourdy	71-67=138	−2
T3	(Spain) Sergio García	68-70=138	−2
T3	(Republic of Ireland) Shane Lowry	68-70=138	−2
T3	(United States) Scott Piercy	68-70=138	−2
T7	(United States) Jim Furyk	71-68=139	−1
T7	(England) Andy Sullivan	71-68=139	−1
T7	(United States) Daniel Summerhays	74-65=139	−1
T7	(England) Lee Westwood	67-72=139	−1

Amateurs: Rahm (+5), Scheffler (+7), Suh (+8), Burns (+9), Horsfield (+9), Hardy (+10), Mueller (+10), Crawford (+12), Bard (+15), Danielson (+19), Stachler (+24)

=== Third round ===
Saturday, June 18, 2016

The round began at 3 pm, on split tees in groupings of three; the final grouping of Dustin Johnson, Andrew Landry, and Scott Piercy teed off at 5:01 pm and completed 13 holes. Play was suspended due to darkness at 8:49 pm with Shane Lowry as the overnight leader at 5 under par, through 14 holes.

Place	Player	To Par	Score	Hole
1	(Republic of Ireland) Shane Lowry	68-70=138	−5	14
2	(United States) Andrew Landry	66-71=137	−3	13
T3	(Spain) Sergio García	68-70=138	−2	14
T3	(United States) Dustin Johnson	67-69=136	−2	13
T3	(England) Lee Westwood	67-72=139	−2	15
6	(South Africa) Branden Grace	73-70-66=209	−1	F

Sunday, June 19, 2016

Play resumed at 7 am and Shane Lowry birdied 15 and 17 for a round of 65 (−5) to extend his lead to four strokes. Andrew Landry bogeyed 14 and 15, but birdied 17 and 18 to move into the final pairing. Daniel Summerhays birdied 15 and eagled 17 to climb into a tie for fourth. After 54 holes, the top eight players on the leaderboard were all seeking their first major title.

Place	Player	Score	To par
1	(Republic of Ireland) Shane Lowry	68-70-65=203	−7
T2	(United States) Andrew Landry	66-71-70=207	−3
T2	(United States) Dustin Johnson	67-69-71=207	−3
T4	(United States) Daniel Summerhays	74-65-69=208	−2
T4	(England) Lee Westwood	67-72-69=208	−2
6	(South Africa) Branden Grace	73-70-66=209	−1
T7	(Spain) Sergio García	68-70-72=210	E
T7	(United States) Scott Piercy	68-70-72=210	E
T9	(Australia) Jason Day	76-69-66=211	+1
T9	(United States) Bryson DeChambeau	71-70-70=211	+1
T9	(United States) Zach Johnson	71-69-71=211	+1

=== Final round ===
Sunday, June 19, 2016

==== Summary ====
Play in the final round began at 10 am, in pairs from the first hole, with the final pair of Shane Lowry and Andrew Landry starting at 3:30 pm. Dustin Johnson shot a 69 and won his first major, three shots ahead of three runners-up. After finishing at five under par, Johnson was penalized a shot as he was judged to have made his ball move as he addressed it on the fifth green, despite being initially absolved of wrongdoing. His score was amended to four under par, but he still finished three strokes ahead. The top four of the leaderboard were the only ones left under par.

==== Final leaderboard ====
Champion
Silver Cup winner (leading amateur)
(a) = amateur
(c) = past champion

Place	Player	Score	To par	Money ($)
1	(United States) Dustin Johnson	67-69-71-69=276	−4	1,800,000
T2	(United States) Jim Furyk (c)	71-68-74-66=279	−1	745,270
T2	(Republic of Ireland) Shane Lowry	68-70-65-76=279	−1	745,270
T2	(United States) Scott Piercy	68-70-72-69=279	−1	745,270
T5	(Spain) Sergio García	68-70-72-70=280	E	374,395
T5	(South Africa) Branden Grace	73-70-66-71=280	E	374,395
7	(United States) Kevin Na	75-68-69-69=281	+1	313,349
T8	(Australia) Jason Day	76-69-66-71=282	+2	247,806
T8	(United States) Jason Dufner	73-71-68-70=282	+2	247,806
T8	(United States) Zach Johnson	71-69-71-71=282	+2	247,806
T8	(United States) Daniel Summerhays	74-65-69-74=282	+2	247,806

Leaderboard below the top 10
Place	Player	Score	To par	Money ($)
12	(Sweden) David Lingmerth	72-69-75-67=283	+3	201,216
T13	(United States) Brooks Koepka	75-69-72-68=284	+4	180,298
T13	(United States) Kevin Streelman	69-74-69-72=284	+4	180,298
T15	(United States) Bryson DeChambeau	71-70-70-74=285	+5	152,234
T15	(United States) Andrew Landry	66-71-70-78=285	+5	152,234
T15	(United States) Brendan Steele	71-71-70-73=285	+5	152,234
T18	(France) Grégory Bourdy	71-67-75-73=286	+6	120,978
T18	(South Korea) Kang Sung-hoon	70-72-70-74=286	+6	120,978
T18	(Australia) Marc Leishman	71-69-77-69=286	+6	120,978
T18	(Northern Ireland) Graeme McDowell (c)	72-71-71-72=286	+6	120,978
T18	(Australia) Adam Scott	71-69-72-74=286	+6	120,978
T23	(South Korea) An Byeong-hun	74-70-73-70=287	+7	82,890
T23	(United States) Derek Fathauer	73-69-70-75=287	+7	82,890
T23	(Scotland) Russell Knox	70-71-73-73=287	+7	82,890
T23	(Japan) Yūsaku Miyazato	73-69-71-74=287	+7	82,890
T23	(South Africa) Louis Oosthuizen	75-65-74-73=287	+7	82,890
T23	(Spain) Jon Rahm (a)	76-69-72-70=287	+7	0
T23	(South Africa) Charl Schwartzel	76-68-69-74=287	+7	82,890
T23	(England) Andy Sullivan	71-68-75-73=287	+7	82,890
T23	(England) Chris Wood	75-70-71-71=287	+7	82,890
T32	(Spain) Rafa Cabrera-Bello	74-70-69-75=288	+8	61,197
T32	(United States) Billy Horschel	72-74-66-76=288	+8	61,197
T32	(United States) Ryan Moore	74-72-72-70=288	+8	61,197
T32	(United States) Justin Thomas	73-69-73-73=288	+8	61,197
T32	(England) Lee Westwood	67-72-69-80=288	+8	61,197
T37	(United States) Daniel Berger	70-72-70-77=289	+9	46,170
T37	(Argentina) Ángel Cabrera (c)	70-76-72-71=289	+9	46,170
T37	(United States) Harris English	70-71-72-76=289	+9	46,170
T37	(United States) Charley Hoffman	72-74-70-73=289	+9	46,170
T37	(Germany) Martin Kaymer (c)	73-73-72-71=289	+9	46,170
T37	(United States) Jason Kokrak	71-70-74-74=289	+9	46,170
T37	(United States) Rob Oppenheim	72-72-72-73=289	+9	46,170
T37	(United States) Jordan Spieth (c)	72-72-70-75=289	+9	46,170
T37	(England) Danny Willett	75-70-73-71=289	+9	46,170
T46	(United States) Matt Kuchar	71-72-71-76=290	+10	34,430
T46	(Italy) Matteo Manassero	76-70-71-73=290	+10	34,430
T46	(United States) Patrick Rodgers	73-72-68-77=290	+10	34,430
T49	(United States) James Hahn	73-71-75-72=291	+11	30,241
T49	(United States) Kevin Kisner	73-71-71-76=291	+11	30,241
T51	(United States) Bill Haas	76-69-73-74=292	+12	27,694
T51	(Japan) Hideto Tanihara	70-76-74-72=292	+12	27,694
T51	(United States) Bubba Watson	69-76-72-75=292	+12	27,694
T54	(England) Matt Fitzpatrick	73-70-79-71=293	+13	26,066
T54	(Argentina) Emiliano Grillo	73-70-75-75=293	+13	26,066
T54	(England) Andrew Johnston	75-69-75-74=293	+13	26,066
T57	(New Zealand) Danny Lee	69-77-74-74=294	+14	25,131
T57	(England) Lee Slattery	72-68-78-76=294	+14	25,131
T59	(United States) Brandon Harkins	71-74-73-77=295	+15	24,525
T59	(Australia) Cameron Smith	71-75-70-79=295	+15	24,525
T61	(United States) Matt Marshall	72-73-75-76=296	+16	23,938
T61	(New Zealand) Tim Wilkinson	71-75-75-75=296	+16	23,938
63	(France) Romain Wattel	71-75-75-76=297	+17	23,497
64	(United States) Chase Parker	75-70-72-81=298	+18	23,203
T65	(United States) Spencer Levin	73-72-77-77=299	+19	22,762
T65	(United States) Ethan Tracy	73-70-79-77=299	+19	22,762
67	(United States) Justin Hicks	73-72-78-81=304	+24	22,324
CUT	(United States) Tony Finau	72-75=147	+7	
CUT	(South Korea) Kim Kyung-tae	73-74=147	+7	
CUT	(United States) Phil Mickelson	74-73=147	+7	
CUT	(Australia) Geoff Ogilvy (c)	71-76=147	+7	
CUT	(United States) Scottie Scheffler (a)	69-78=147	+7	
CUT	(France) Gary Stal	71-76=147	+7	
CUT	(United States) Kevin Tway	74-73=147	+7	
CUT	(England) Matthew Baldwin	75-73=148	+8	
CUT	(England) Paul Casey	75-73=148	+8	
CUT	(England) Luke Donald	76-72=148	+8	
CUT	(Wales) Jamie Donaldson	74-74=148	+8	
CUT	(United States) Chris Kirk	75-73=148	+8	
CUT	(United States) Denny McCarthy	76-72=148	+8	
CUT	(Northern Ireland) Rory McIlroy (c)	77-71=148	+8	
CUT	(Australia) Aron Price	76-72=148	+8	
CUT	(United States) Patrick Reed	74-74=148	+8	
CUT	(England) Justin Rose (c)	72-76=148	+8	
CUT	(Sweden) Sebastian Söderberg	75-73=148	+8	
CUT	(United States) Robert Streb	76-72=148	+8	
CUT	(United States) Justin Suh (a)	75-73=148	+8	
CUT	(Austria) Bernd Wiesberger	76-72=148	+8	
CUT	(United States) Keegan Bradley	71-78=149	+9	
CUT	(United States) Sam Burns (a)	74-75=149	+9	
CUT	(United States) Kevin Chappell	76-73=149	+9	
CUT	(United States) Lucas Glover (c)	75-74=149	+9	
CUT	(United States) J. B. Holmes	76-73=149	+9	
CUT	(England) Sam Horsfield (a)	76-73=149	+9	
CUT	(United States) T. J. Howe	76-73=149	+9	
CUT	(Denmark) Søren Kjeldsen	73-76=149	+9	
CUT	(Sweden) Mikael Lundberg	75-74=149	+9	
CUT	(United States) William McGirt	75-74=149	+9	
CUT	(United States) David Toms	80-69=149	+9	
CUT	(United States) Kent Bulle	76-74=150	+10	
CUT	(South Africa) Ernie Els (c)	75-75=150	+10	
CUT	(South Africa) Retief Goosen (c)	73-77=150	+10	
CUT	(United States) Nick Hardy (a)	77-73=150	+10	
CUT	(United States) Kyle Mueller (a)	77-73=150	+10	
CUT	(United States) Patrick Wilkes-Krier	78-72=150	+10	
CUT	(United States) Aaron Wise	74-76=150	+10	
CUT	(United States) Frank Adams III	76-75=151	+11	
CUT	(United States) Mark Anguiano	77-74=151	+11	
CUT	(United States) Rickie Fowler	76-75=151	+11	
CUT	(United States) Andres Gonzales	76-75=151	+11	
CUT	(Japan) Yuta Ikeda	75-76=151	+11	
CUT	(India) Anirban Lahiri	73-78=151	+11	
CUT	(United States) Andy Pope	77-74=151	+11	
CUT	(United States) Tyler Raber	73-78=151	+11	
CUT	(United States) Webb Simpson (c)	77-74=151	+11	
CUT	(United States) Brandt Snedeker	80-71=151	+11	
CUT	(United States) D. J. Trahan	77-74=151	+11	
CUT	(United States) Jimmy Walker	75-76=151	+11	
CUT	(Thailand) Thitiphun Chuayprakong	73-79=152	+12	
CUT	(United States) Chris Crawford (a)	76-76=152	+12	
CUT	(United States) J. J. Henry	77-75=152	+12	
CUT	(Japan) Hideki Matsuyama	74-78=152	+12	
CUT	(Sweden) Alex Norén	74-78=152	+12	
CUT	(Mexico) Carlos Ortiz	76-76=152	+12	
CUT	(South Africa) Thomas Aiken	79-74=153	+13	
CUT	(United States) Matt Borchert	73-80=153	+13	
CUT	(United States) Billy Hurley III	78-75=153	+13	
CUT	(United States) Smylie Kaufman	77-76=153	+13	
CUT	(United States) Michael Miller	72-81=153	+13	
CUT	(South Africa) Jaco van Zyl	75-78=153	+13	
CUT	(Thailand) Kiradech Aphibarnrat	78-76=154	+14	
CUT	(United States) Wes Short Jr.	78-76=154	+14	
CUT	(Philippines) Miguel Tabuena	74-80=154	+14	
CUT	(United States) Jason Allred	78-77=155	+15	
CUT	(United States) Derek Bard (a)	77-78=155	+15	
CUT	(United States) Jim Herman	76-79=155	+15	
CUT	(Germany) Maximilian Kieffer	77-78=155	+15	
CUT	(United States) Patton Kizzire	77-78=155	+15	
CUT	(India) Jeev Milkha Singh	76-79=155	+15	
CUT	(United States) Dicky Pride	78-77=155	+15	
CUT	(United States) Richie Schembechler	79-76=155	+15	
CUT	(United States) Tom Hoge	78-78=156	+16	
CUT	(Japan) Toru Taniguchi	78-78=156	+16	
CUT	(United States) Mike Van Sickle	76-80=156	+16	
CUT	(Australia) Steven Bowditch	84-73=157	+17	
CUT	(United States) Derek Chang	80-77=157	+17	
CUT	(United States) Jeff Maggert	79-79=158	+18	
CUT	(United States) Gregor Main	84-74=158	+18	
CUT	(United States) Charlie Danielson (a)	78-81=159	+19	
CUT	(United States) Kevin Foley	75-85=160	+20	
CUT	(United States) Austin Jordan	77-84=161	+21	
CUT	(United States) Ryan Stachler (a)	78-84=162	+22	
CUT	(Denmark) Søren Hansen	79-84=163	+23	
CUT	(United States) Zach Edmondson	89-77=166	+26	
WD	(Sweden) Henrik Stenson	69	−1	
DQ	(Sweden) Peter Hanson			

==== Scorecard ====
Final round

Hole	1	2	3	4	5	6	7	8	9	10	11	12	13	14	15	16	17	18
Par	4	4	4	5	4	3	4	3	4	4	4	5	3	4	4	3	4	4
(United States) D. Johnson	−3	−4	−4	−4	−3	−3	−3	−3	−4	−4	−4	−4	−4	−3	−3	−3	−3	−4
(United States) Furyk	+2	+2	+2	+2	+1	+1	E	E	E	E	−1	−1	−1	−1	−1	−1	−2	−1
(Republic of Ireland) Lowry	−7	−6	−6	−6	−5	−5	−5	−5	−4	−3	−3	−4	−4	−3	−2	−1	−1	−1
(United States) Piercy	−1	−2	−2	−2	−2	−2	−2	−2	−2	−2	−2	−3	−3	−3	−3	−2	−2	−1
(Spain) García	E	E	E	−1	−2	−2	−1	−2	−2	−2	−2	−2	−3	−2	−1	E	E	E
(South Africa) Grace	−1	−2	−1	−1	−1	−1	−1	−1	−1	−1	−1	−2	−2	−1	−1	E	−1	E
(United States) Na	+1	+1	+1	+1	E	E	+1	+1	+2	+2	+2	+1	+1	+1	+2	+2	+1	+1
(Australia) Day	+2	+1	+1	+1	+1	+1	+1	+1	+2	+2	+2	E	−1	−1	−1	−1	+1	+2
(United States) Dufner	+2	+1	+1	+1	+1	+1	+1	+1	+2	+2	+3	+2	+1	+2	+2	+2	+2	+2
(United States) Z. Johnson	+2	+2	+3	+3	+2	+2	+2	+2	+2	+2	+4	+3	+3	+2	+2	+3	+3	+2
(United States) Summerhays	−1	−1	−1	−1	−1	−1	E	+1	+2	+3	+3	+2	+2	+2	+2	+3	+2	+2
(United States) Landry	−2	−1	−1	E	+2	+2	+3	+4	+4	+5	+5	+5	+5	+5	+5	+5	+5	+5
(England) Westwood	−2	−1	E	+1	+3	+4	+5	+5	+6	+6	+6	+6	+6	+7	+8	+9	+8	+8

Cumulative tournament scores, relative to par

Eagle	Birdie	Bogey	Double bogey

== Controversy ==
During the final round of the tournament, there was a controversial incident on the fifth green that involved eventual winner Dustin Johnson. As he prepared to address the ball for a par putt, his ball moved slightly. Johnson stepped away, saying that he had not addressed the ball. After he spoke to an on-site rules official, he was told to carry on with his shot and sank the putt. Later, on the 12th tee, an official informed him that he might be penalized a stroke, but that no decision would be made until the round was complete. The penalty was ultimately assessed against Johnson which still left him three strokes ahead of three second-place finishers. Several of the world's top golfers, such as Jordan Spieth, Rory McIlroy, and Rickie Fowler, as well as many viewers on their local Fox stations and spectators at the course, took to social media to criticize the USGA for its decision.

== Media ==
For the second year, Fox Sports televised the championship in the United States. The first two rounds were on FS1 cable and over-the-air on Fox, with the last two rounds shown only on Fox. In the United Kingdom and Ireland, it was carried by Sky Sports.
