= Perry High School (Stark County, Ohio) =

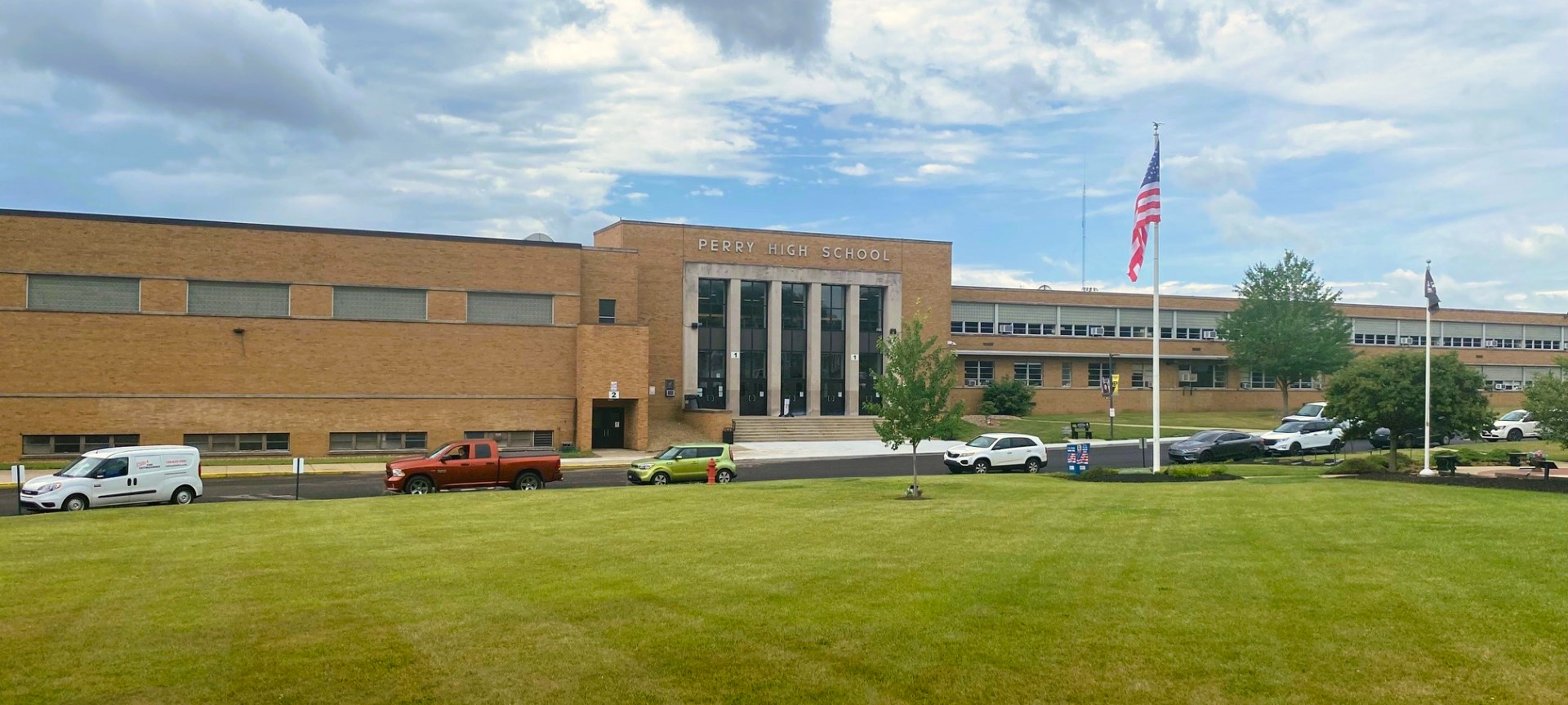
- Front of Perry High School (2025)

Location
- 3737 13th Street SW; Massillon, Ohio 44646; United States; 40.7891°N 81.4632°W

Information
- School type: Public
- Opened: 1956
- School district: Perry Local School District
- Superintendent: Nathan Stutz
- Principal: Bill Hildebrand
- Staff: 74.34 (FTE)
- Grades: 9-12
- Enrollment: 1,456 (2024–2025)
- Student to teacher ratio: 19.59
- Colours: Black, White, and Gold
- Fight song: Across the field
- Athletics: OHSAA Division 2
- Athletics conference: Federal League
- Mascot: Panther
- Nickname: Panthers
- Team name: Panthers
- Rival: Central Catholic High School
- Accreditation: Pride, Excellence, Tradition
- Communities served: Perry Township, Village of Richville
- Feeder schools: Southway Elementary, Watson Elementary, Lohr Elementary, Pfieffer Intermediate, Edison Middle School
- Website: https://phs.perrylocal.org/
- Last updated: 2025

Perry High School is a public high school in Perry Township, Ohio, United States near Massillon. It is the only public high school in the Perry Local School District in Stark County.

== Academics ==
Perry High School ranks within the top 50% of all 3,241 schools in Ohio (based on combined math and reading proficiency testing data). Perry High School offers AP courses, Dual-Enrollment, Technical Certification Courses, and Honors Education Courses. Perry High Schools boasts a 96% graduation rate, higher than the 87% state average.

== Athletics ==
Perry High School competes in the Federal League, offering a variety of Athletics including:

- Baseball
- Basketball (Girls & Boys)
- Bowling (Girls & Boys)
- Cheerleading
- Dance
- Football
- Golf (Girls & Boys)
- Gymnastics
- Soccer (Girls & Boys)
- Softball
- Swimming (Girls & Boys)
- Track and Field
- Tennis (Girls & Boys)
- Wrestling (Girls & Boys)

=== Athletic achievements ===
Federal League

- 8 Federal League Baseball Champions
- 18 Federal League Football Champions

District

- 2012 - District Baseball Champions
- 2025 - District Basketball Champions

OHSAA

- 1991 - Division I Boys Basketball State Semi-Finalists
- 2010 - Division I Softball State Champions
- 2014 - Division I Wrestling State Champions
- 2015 - Division II Football State Finalists
- 2016 - Division II Football State Finalists
- 2018 - Division I Softball State Champions
- 2021 - OHSAA Division I Softball State Champions
- 2025 - OHSAA Division II Basketball State Runner-Up

Nationally

- #13 Nationally Ranked Wrestling Program

== Fine Arts ==
=== Band ===
The Perry High School Marching Band has qualified for OMEA State Finals in 2011, 2012, 2013, 2014, 2015, 2016, 2017, 2018, 2019, 2021, 2022, 2023, and 2024. The marching class of 2017 was the first to receive superior ratings all 4 years at states. The Perry High School Marching Band has earned consistent superior ratings since 2013.

Perry High School also offers Concert Band, Symphonic Winds, Jazz Ensemble, and Percussion Ensemble. The Symphonic Winds have earned superior ratings in Class AA and A over 37 times. In 1991, The Perry Symphonic Winds performed at the Midwest International Band and Orchestra clinic and performed at the OMEA State Convention in 2015.

=== Choir ===
Perry High School currently has multiple different choirs including Bel Canto, Lyrics, Kinsmen, Treblemakers, and Symphonic. These choirs perform numerous concerts ranging from classical to popular music throughout the school year, including school sanctioned events. Multiple choirs have performed at OMEA sanctioned events and competitions.

=== Theatre ===
The Perry Theatre was christened the "Little Broadway" of Stark County by the Canton Repository. The term was highlighted as part of a feature article reporting the yearly successes, sell-out crowds and continued demand for tickets that the Perry Theatre had established over the years. Theatre Students, along with their directors as well as school administrators accepted the title. With that acceptance the Perry Theatre established a yearly mission and commitment to uphold the honor. The Perry Players perform at the Louie Mattachione Theatre at Perry High School and were under the direction of Louie Mattachione for over 50 years until his retirement.

The Perry Theatre performs a 3 shows per year: a Fall show, a Winter Children's show, and a Spring Musical.

=== Speech and Debate ===
The Perry Speech and Debate Team won the Ohio Speech and Debate Association State Title in 2004, 2005, 2007, 2008, 2018, 2019, and 2020. They were inducted into the 500 club for at least 500 NSDA letters and degrees. They have had multiple individual state champions as well. The team was coached by Mrs. Kathy Patron until her retirement in 2024, where the team was taken over by current head coach Mrs. Melody Woodson.

== Notable alumni ==
- Matt Campbell: head football coach at Penn State University
- David Carr: Team USA wrestling gold medalist
- Tyler Light: professional golfer
- Steve Luke: NCAA wrestling champion at Michigan
- Onya Nurve: drag queen and winner of the seventeenth season of RuPaul's Drag Race
- Dustin Schlatter: NCAA wrestling champion at Minnesota
