= Chase Parker (golfer) =

American professional golfer (born 1991)

Personal information
- Nationality: United States
- Born: April 3, 1991 (age 35) Augusta, Georgia, U.S.
- Height: 5 ft 9 in (1.75 m)
- Weight: 165 lb (75 kg; 11.8 st)

Career
- Sport: Golf
- College: University of Kentucky
- Turned professional: 2014
- Current tour: Korn Ferry Tour

Best results in major championships
- Masters Tournament: DNP
- PGA Championship: DNP
- U.S. Open: 64th: 2016
- The Open Championship: DNP

Chase Parker (born April 3, 1991) is an American professional golfer.

Parker played his college golf at the University of Kentucky.

Parker made the cut at the 2016 U.S. Open and finished 64th.

== Results in major championships ==
Tournament	2016
U.S. Open	64

Note: Parker only played in the U.S. Open.
