= Matt Marshall (golfer) =

American professional golfer

Personal information
- Nationality: United States
- Born: March 22, 1985 (age 41) Reno, Nevada
- Height: 5 ft 8 in (1.73 m)
- Weight: 160 lb (73 kg; 11 st)

Career
- Sport: Golf
- College: University of California, Davis
- Status: Professional
- Former tour: PGA Tour Canada

Best results in major championships
- Masters Tournament: DNP
- PGA Championship: DNP
- U.S. Open: T61: 2016
- The Open Championship: DNP

Matt Marshall (born March 22, 1985) is an American professional golfer from Carlton, Oregon.

He made the cut at the 2016 U.S. Open. He qualified for the Open by way of a playoff in sectional qualifying. This was his first U.S. Open.

Prior to his U.S. Open qualification, he played seven years on PGA Tour Canada, where his best finish was second place at the 2012 ATB Financial Classic.

Marshall is a graduate of the University of California, Davis.

== Results in major championships ==
Tournament	2016
U.S. Open	T61

"T" = tied
Note: Marshall only played in the U.S. Open.
