= Tyler Light =

American golfer

Personal information
- Nationality: United States
- Born: Massillon, Ohio, U.S.
- Height: 6 ft 0 in (183 cm)
- Weight: 193 lb (88 kg)

Career
- Sport: Golf
- College: Malone University
- Turned professional: 2014
- Former tour: PGA Tour Canada

Best results in major championships
- Masters Tournament: DNP
- PGA Championship: DNP
- U.S. Open: 67th: 2017
- The Open Championship: DNP

Tyler Light (born c. 1990) is an American professional golfer.

== High school and college career ==
Light was born in Massillon, Ohio. He competed at Perry High School and then Malone University.

== Professional career ==
Light competed on PGA Tour Canada in 2015, where he made three cuts in eleven starts.

At the 2017 U.S. Open, he made the cut on the line at one over. It is the second consecutive year, and the second time overall, that a former Malone University golfer competed in the U.S. Open.

== Outside golf ==
To financially support his golf career, Light works at United Parcel Service.

== Results in major championships ==
Tournament	2017
Masters Tournament	
U.S. Open	67
Open Championship	
PGA Championship	

Did not play

CUT = missed the half-way cut
"T" = tied for place
