= Jimmy Gunn (golfer) =

Scottish golfer

Personal information
- Nationality: Scotland
- Born: 18 July 1980 (age 46) Dingwall, Scotland
- Height: 6 ft 0 in (1.83 m)
- Weight: 170 lb (77 kg; 12 st)

Career
- Sport: Golf
- Turned professional: 2007
- Current tour: Korn Ferry Tour
- Former tour: Gateway Tour
- Professional wins: 3

Best results in major championships
- Masters Tournament: DNP
- PGA Championship: DNP
- U.S. Open: T27: 2015
- The Open Championship: DNP

Jimmy Gunn (born 18 July 1980) is a Scottish professional golfer.

== Career ==
Unlike most professional golfers, Gunn did not play golf in college, but worked on oil rigs and built homes after finishing his schooling.

In 2007, Gunn moved to the United States to turn professional. Gunn played the 2014 season on the Web.com Tour with a best finish of T-18 at the BMW Charity Pro-Am. He played the 2015 season on the Gateway Tour.

Gunn finished tied for 27th at the 2015 U.S. Open. To qualify for the open he had to play in both local and sectional qualifying and ultimately qualified as an alternate.

Since 2016, Gunn has played on the Web.com Tour. His best result was in the 2017 The Bahamas Great Abaco Classic where he was runner-up to Andrew Landry.

== Professional wins (3) ==
=== Gateway Tour wins (1) ===
- 2015 Spring 3

=== Other wins (2) ===
- 2013 San Juan Open
- 2015 Colorado Open

== Results in major championships ==
Tournament	2015
Masters Tournament	
U.S. Open	T27
The Open Championship	
PGA Championship	

Did not play

"T" indicates a tie for a place
