= Gregor Main =

American golfer (born 1989)

Personal information
- Nationality: United States
- Born: July 5, 1989 (age 37) Berkeley, California, U.S.
- Height: 5 ft 10 in (1.78 m)
- Weight: 147 lb (67 kg; 10.5 st)

Career
- Sport: Golf
- College: University of California, Los Angeles
- Turned professional: 2011
- Former tour: Challenge Tour
- Professional wins: 1

Best results in major championships
- Masters Tournament: DNP
- PGA Championship: DNP
- U.S. Open: CUT: 2016
- The Open Championship: DNP

Gregor Main (born July 5, 1989) is an American professional golfer.

Main was born in Berkeley, California. He played college golf at UCLA, turning pro after his junior year. He earned medalist honors qualifying for the 2011 U.S. Amateur.

Main qualified for the 2016 U.S. Open through sectional qualifying. After posting 66 at the morning round at the Olympic Club, Ocean Course and 68 at Lake Merced Golf Club for a cumulative 134, he finished T2 just behind Miguel Tabuena at 132.

== Amateur wins (1) ==
- 2009 Southern Amateur

== Professional wins ==
- 2016 Northern California Open

== Results in major championships ==
Tournament	2016
U.S. Open	CUT

CUT = missed the half-way cut
Note: Main only played in the U.S. Open.
