= Perry Local School District (Stark County) =

School district in Ohio, United States

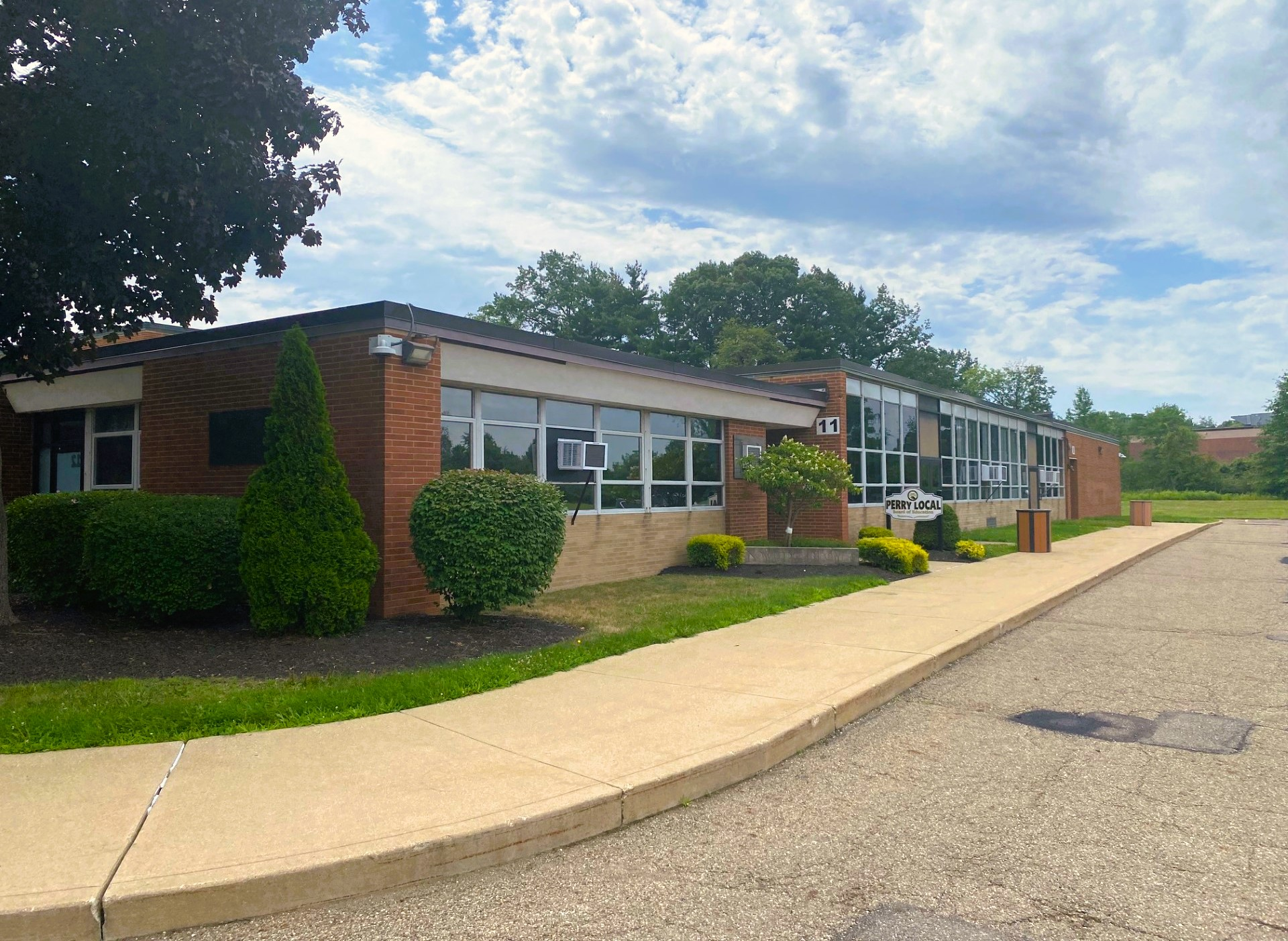

Address
- 4201 13th Street Southwest Massillon, Ohio, 44646; United States

District information
- Type: Public
- Grades: PK–12
- Established: 1853; 173 years ago
- Superintendent: Nathan Stutz
- Schools: 7
- NCES District ID: 3904992

Students and staff
- Students: 4,240 (2024–2025)
- Teachers: 241.96 (on an FTE basis) (2024–2025)
- Staff: 512.20 (on an FTE basis) (2024–2025)
- Student–teacher ratio: 17.52 (2024–2025)
- Athletic conference: Federal League Conference
- District mascot: Panther
- Colors: Black and White

Other information
- Website: perrylocal.org

Perry Local School District is a public school district in Stark County, Ohio, serving students in nearly all of Perry Township and portions of the city of Massillon. There are five elementary schools for grades K-4. Pfeiffer Intermediate School houses grades 5-6. Edison Middle School houses 7-8. Perry High School houses 9-12. The district offers preschool at Knapp Elementary. As of the 2022–2023 school year, the district had 4,352 students and 266.69 full-time equivalent teachers, for a student-teacher ratio of 16.32. The majority of the student body identifies as white, and the district's minority enrollment is 10%.

== Schools ==
=== Elementary schools and Preschools ===
- T.C. Knapp Preschool
- P.J. Lohr Elementary School (since 2024)
- Watson Elementary (since 2024)
- Southway Elementary (since 2024)

=== Intermediate school ===
- Pfeiffer Intermediate School

=== Middle school ===
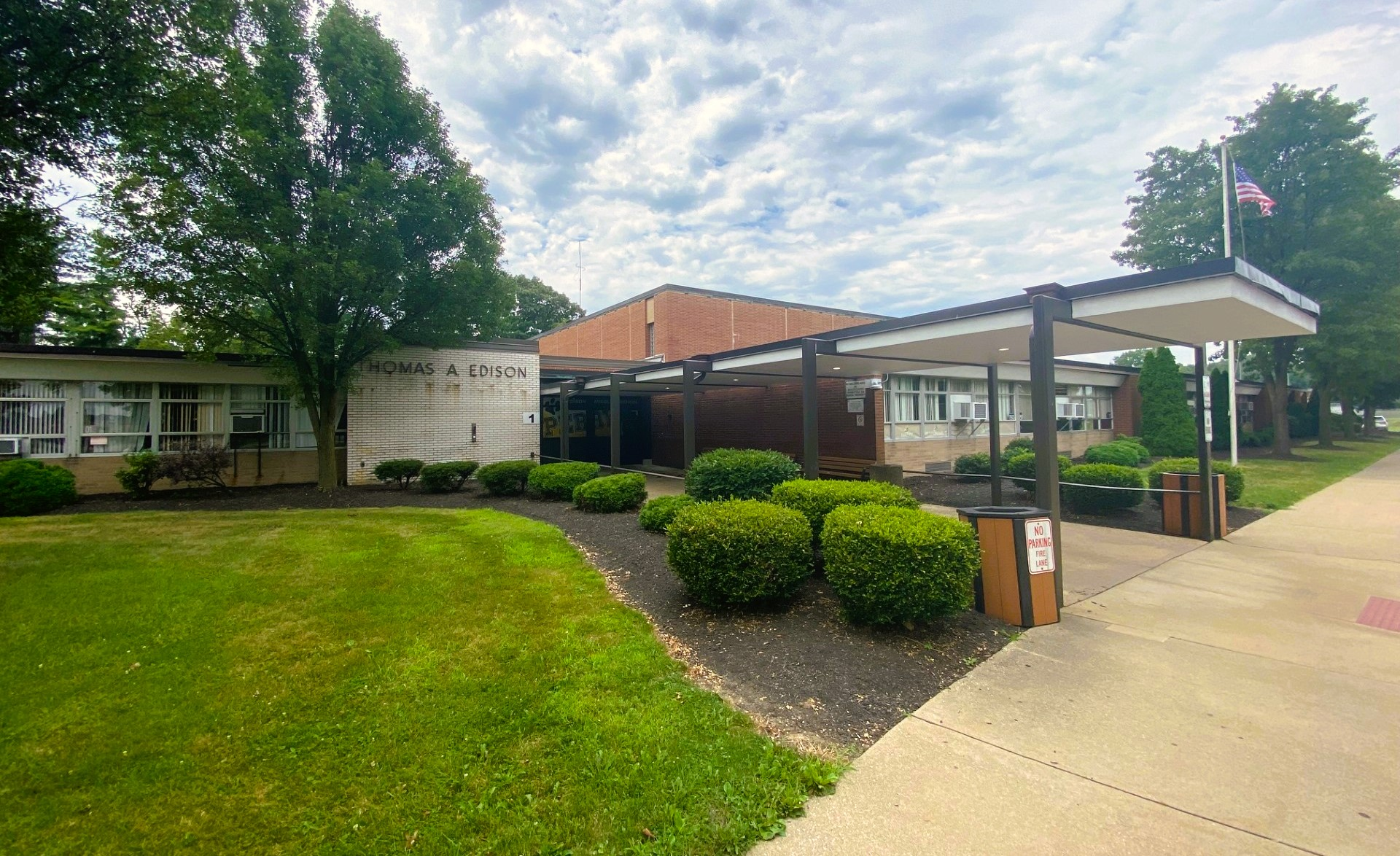
- Edison Middle School
  Edison Middle School

=== High school ===
- Perry High School

=== Former ===
- Reedurban Elementary (demolished)
- Richville Elementary (demolished)
- Genoa Elementary (demolished)
- Whipple Elementary (demolished)
