= 2015 U.S. Open (golf) =

Coordinates: 47.20°N 122.57°W

Tournament information
- Dates: June 18–21, 2015
- Location: University Place, Washington
- Course: Chambers Bay
- Organized by: USGA
- Tour(s): PGA Tour; European Tour; Japan Golf Tour

Statistics
- Par: 70
- Length: 7,384 yards (6,752 m) to 7,695 yards (7,036 m)
- Field: 156 players, 75 after cut
- Cut: 145 (+5)
- Prize fund: $10,000,000 €8,944,383
- Winner's share: $1,800,000 €1,609,989

Champion
- (United States) Jordan Spieth
- 275 (−5)

The 2015 United States Open Championship was the 115th U.S. Open, played June 18–21, 2015 at Chambers Bay in University Place, Washington, southwest of Tacoma on the shore of Puget Sound. Jordan Spieth won his first U.S. Open and consecutive major titles, one stroke ahead of runners-up Dustin Johnson and Louis Oosthuizen. This was the first U.S. Open televised by Fox Sports 1 and Fox Sports, launching a 12-year contract with the United States Golf Association.

Spieth, age 21, became the youngest U.S. Open champion in 92 years, since Bobby Jones in 1923. The reigning Masters champion, Spieth became the youngest to win the Masters and U.S. Open in the same year, passing Tiger Woods, who won both in 2002 at age 26. Others to win the first two majors of the year were Craig Wood (1941), Ben Hogan (1951, 1953), Arnold Palmer (1960), and Jack Nicklaus (1972).

This was the first U.S. Open played in the Pacific Northwest and the third major played in the state of Washington, which hosted the PGA Championship in 1944 and 1998.

== Venue ==
Owned by Pierce County, the Chambers Bay course opened for play only eight years earlier in June 2007. It was constructed a former quarry that faces Puget Sound and an active freight railroad. A Sounder commuter train platform at Chambers Bay with service from Seattle was planned by Sound Transit for the tournament, but was later cancelled due to logistical and financial challenges.

=== Course layout ===
Location in the United States
Location in Washington

The course was laid out differently each day, with course totals ranging from 7,384 yards (6,752 m) on Sunday, to 7,695 yards (7,036 m) on Friday. Holes 1 and 18 were played as either par-4 or par-5: the first was a par-4 and the 18th was a par-5 for three of the rounds, switching only for the second round on Friday, and the course was par 70 for each round.

Hole	Name	Yards	Par	Hole	Name	Yards	Par
1	Puget Sound	598/496	5/4	10	High Dunes	436/468	4
2	Foxy	399	4	11	Shadows	500/537	4
3	Blown Out	163–198	3	12	The Narrows	311	4
4	Hazard's Ascent	495	4	13	Eagle Eye	534	4
5	Free Fall	488	4	14	Cape Fear	521/546	4
6	Deception Point	495	4	15	Lone Fir	123–246	3
7	Humpback	508	4	16	Beached	423	4
8	High Road Low Road	614	5	17	Derailed	172–218	3
9	Olympus	224/217	3	18	Tahoma	525/604	4/5
Out			36/35	In			34/35
Championship tees: Rating=78.1, Slope=146				Total		7,384–7,695	70

Round	Hole	1	2	3	4	5	6	7	8	9	Out	10	11	12	13	14	15	16	17	18	In	Total
	Par	4	4	3	4	4	4	4	5	3	35	4	4	4	4	4	3	4	3	5	35	70
1	Yards	501	387	148	475	503	494	515	602	203	3,828	427	541	317	512	528	169	385	173	617	3,669	7,497
2	Yards	593^	403	207	494	486	512	506	582	237	4,020	483	544	284	551	513	144	416	226	514^	3,675	7,695
3	Yards	499	399	166	509	498	515	519	603	225	3,933	473	530	311	533	534	252	372	122	577	3,704	7,637
4	Yards	443	412	188	479	462	493	477	593	203	3,750	460	541	270	529	519	158	337	219	601	3,634	7,384

^ In Round 2 on Friday, Hole #1 was played as a par 5 and #18 as a par 4; par was 36 out and 34 in.

=== Criticism of the course ===
Chambers Bay was subject to criticism for its bumpy greens, unfair course design, and poor accessibility for spectators. Former U.S. Open champion Gary Player called it "the worst golf course I might've ever seen in the 63 years as a professional golfer", and Henrik Stenson said that the greens were like "putting on broccoli".

== Field ==
About half the field consisted of players who are exempt from qualifying for the U.S. Open. Each player is classified according to the first category in which he qualified, and other categories are shown in parentheses.

1. Winners of the U.S. Open Championship during the last ten years

- Ángel Cabrera
- Lucas Glover
- Martin Kaymer (7,8,11,12,13,14)
- Graeme McDowell (13,14)
- Rory McIlroy (6,7,12,13,14)
- Geoff Ogilvy (12)
- Justin Rose (12,13,14)
- Webb Simpson (12,13,14)
- Tiger Woods (8)
- Prior to the tournament, Michael Campbell, the 2005 winner, announced his retirement from golf.

2. Winner and runner-up of the 2014 U.S. Amateur Championship

- Gunn Yang (a)
- Corey Conners forfeited his exemption by turning professional.

3. Winner of the 2014 Amateur Championship

- Bradley Neil (a)

4. Winner of the 2014 Mark H. McCormack Medal (men's World Amateur Golf Ranking)

- Ollie Schniederjans (a)

5. Winners of the Masters Tournament during the last five years

- Charl Schwartzel (13,14)
- Adam Scott (11,12,13,14)
- Jordan Spieth (12,13,14)
- Bubba Watson (12,13,14)

6. Winners of The Open Championship during the last five years

- Darren Clarke
- Ernie Els
- Phil Mickelson (13,14)
- Louis Oosthuizen (13,14)

7. Winners of the PGA Championship during the last five years

- Keegan Bradley (11,13,14)
- Jason Dufner

8. Winners of The Players Championship during the last three years

- Rickie Fowler (11,12,13,14)

9. Winner of the 2015 European Tour BMW PGA Championship

- An Byeong-hun (13,14)

10. Winner of the 2014 U.S. Senior Open Championship

- Colin Montgomerie

11. The 10 lowest scorers and anyone tying for 10th place at the 2014 U.S. Open Championship

- Erik Compton
- Jason Day (12,13,14)
- Dustin Johnson (12,13,14)
- Brooks Koepka (13,14)
- Brandt Snedeker (13,14)
- Henrik Stenson (13,14)
- Jimmy Walker (12,13,14)

12. Players who qualified for the season-ending 2014 Tour Championship

- Jim Furyk (13,14)
- Sergio García (13,14)
- Bill Haas (13,14)
- Russell Henley (13,14)
- Morgan Hoffmann
- Billy Horschel (13,14)
- Zach Johnson (13,14)
- Chris Kirk (13,14)
- Matt Kuchar (13,14)
- Hunter Mahan (13,14)
- Hideki Matsuyama (13,14)
- Kevin Na (13,14)
- Ryan Palmer (13,14)
- Patrick Reed (13,14)
- John Senden (13,14)
- Brendon Todd (13,14)
- Cameron Tringale
- Gary Woodland (13,14)

13. The top 60 point leaders and ties as of May 25, 2015 in the Official World Golf Ranking

- Paul Casey (14)
- George Coetzee
- Jamie Donaldson (14)
- Victor Dubuisson (14)
- Matt Every (14)
- Tommy Fleetwood (14)
- Stephen Gallacher (14)
- Branden Grace (14)
- Charley Hoffman (14)
- J. B. Holmes (14)
- Thongchai Jaidee (14)
- Miguel Ángel Jiménez (14)
- Anirban Lahiri (14)
- Marc Leishman (14)
- Shane Lowry (14)
- Joost Luiten (14)
- Ben Martin (14)
- Francesco Molinari (14)
- Ryan Moore (14)
- Ian Poulter (14)
- Marc Warren
- Lee Westwood (14)
- Bernd Wiesberger (14)
- Danny Willett (14)

14. The top 60 point leaders and ties as of June 15, 2015 in the Official World Golf Ranking

- Kevin Kisner
- Andy Sullivan

15. Special exemptions given by the USGA

- None

The remaining contestants earned their places through sectional qualifiers.

- Japan: Baek Seuk-hyun, Kurt Barnes, Hiroyuki Fujita, Masahiro Kawamura, Liang Wenchong
- England: Thomas Aiken, Lucas Bjerregaard, Marcus Fraser, Shiv Kapur, Alexander Lévy, Garth Mulroy, Alex Norén, Jason Palmer, John Parry, Marcel Siem, Tjaart van der Walt
- United States

- Newport Beach, California: Jared Becher (L), Brian Campbell (a), Beau Hossler (a), Alex Kim (L), Jake Knapp (a,L), Kevin Lucas (L)
- Jupiter, Florida: Luke Donald, Sam Horsfield (a), Jack Maguire (a), Andy Pope (L)
- Ball Ground, Georgia: Roberto Castro, Lee McCoy (a), Matthew NeSmith (a,L)
- Rockville, Maryland: Billy Hurley III, Denny McCarthy (a), Timothy O'Neal (L)
- Purchase, New York: Rich Berberian Jr. (L), Lee Janzen, Jamie Lovemark, Pat Wilson (L)
- Columbus, Ohio: Sebastian Cappelen, Bryson DeChambeau (a), Brad Fritsch, David Hearn, Ryo Ishikawa, Danny Lee, George McNeill, D. A. Points, Michael Putnam, Sam Saunders, Cameron Smith, Robert Streb, Daniel Summerhays, Bo Van Pelt, Camilo Villegas
- Springfield, Ohio: Michael Davan (L), Tony Finau, Nick Hardy (a,L), Stephan Jäger (L)
- Memphis, Tennessee: Blayne Barber, Charlie Beljan, Tyler Duncan (L), Brad Elder (L), Retief Goosen, Brandon Hagy (L), Brian Harman, Tom Hoge (L), Davis Riley (a), Andrés Romero
- Dallas, Texas: Jason Allred, Cody Gribble, Cole Hammer (a,L), Kyle Jones (a), Matt Mabrey (L), Mark Silvers (L)
- Cle Elum, Washington: Troy Kelly, Richard H. Lee, Pan Cheng-tsung (L)

Alternates who gained entry:

- Oliver Farr (England)
- Shunsuke Sonoda (Japan)
- Kevin Chappell (Columbus) – claimed spot held for category 14
- Jimmy Gunn (L, Memphis) – claimed spot held for category 14
- Steve Marino (Dallas) – claimed spot held for category 14
- Josh Persons (L, Rockville) – claimed spot held for category 14

(a) denotes amateur
(L) denotes player advanced through local qualifying

== Round summaries ==
=== First round ===
Thursday, June 18, 2015

Dustin Johnson and Henrik Stenson both posted rounds of 65 (−5) to share the lead after the first round. Johnson recorded four birdies on his back-nine and did not make a bogey until the par-3 9th, his 18th hole of the round. Stenson, meanwhile, birdied four of his last five holes to tie Johnson for the lead. Jordan Spieth, the reigning Masters champion, was three strokes back after a 68. Three-time champion Tiger Woods opened with a round of 80 (+10), his worst score ever at the U.S. Open. Brian Campbell, a senior at the University of Illinois, was low amateur after a round of 67 (−3), two behind the lead.

The first hole was set as a par-4 at 501 yards (458 m) and the 18th hole as par-5 at 617 yards (564 m), with the course at 7,497 yards (6,855 m). The scoring average for the field was 72.72 (+2.72) and 25 players had under-par rounds.

Place	Player	Score	To par
T1	(United States) Dustin Johnson	65	−5
T1	(Sweden) Henrik Stenson	65	−5
3	(United States) Patrick Reed	66	−4
T4	(United States) Brian Campbell (a)	67	−3
T4	(United States) Matt Kuchar	67	−3
T4	(United States) Ben Martin	67	−3
T7	(Australia) Jason Day	68	−2
T7	(United States) Jason Dufner	68	−2
T7	(United States) Cody Gribble	68	−2
T7	(Netherlands) Joost Luiten	68	−2
T7	(Italy) Francesco Molinari	68	−2
T7	(United States) Jordan Spieth	68	−2
T7	(Scotland) Marc Warren	68	−2

=== Second round ===
Friday, June 19, 2015

Masters champion Jordan Spieth shot a round of 67 (−3) to tie Patrick Reed for the 36-hole lead. First round co-leader Dustin Johnson got as low as 7-under before bogeys on three of his last five holes dropped him to a stroke behind the leaders. Jason Day was just two shots off the lead playing the 9th hole, his 18th of the round, when he collapsed from vertigo. After being treated by medical personnel for several minutes, Day was able to finish the hole and made bogey, dropping to three behind and a tie for 9th place. Tiger Woods missed the cut with a two-round score of 16-over-par, his worst 36-hole score in a major.

A bogey on the final hole by Nick Hardy, a freshman from the University of Illinois, moved the cut line to +5. Fifteen additional players earned entry into the third round, including Ángel Cabrera, Sergio García, Colin Montgomerie, Webb Simpson, and Jimmy Walker.

The 1st hole was set as a 593-yard par-5 and the 18th hole as 514-yard par-4, with the total yardage at 7,695. The scoring average for the field was 73.48 (+3.48) and 18 players had under-par rounds. J. B. Holmes and Louis Oosthuizen had the low rounds of the day, 66 (−4).

Place	Player	Score	To par
T1	(United States) Patrick Reed	66-69=135	−5
T1	(United States) Jordan Spieth	68-67=135	−5
T3	(South Africa) Branden Grace	69-67=136	−4
T3	(United States) Dustin Johnson	65-71=136	−4
T5	(United States) Tony Finau	69-68=137	−3
T5	(Netherlands) Joost Luiten	68-69=137	−3
T5	(United States) Ben Martin	67-70=137	−3
T5	(United States) Daniel Summerhays	70-67=137	−3
T9	(Australia) Jason Day	68-70=138	−2
T9	(United States) J. B. Holmes	72-66=138	−2
T9	(United States) Jamie Lovemark	70-68=138	−2

Amateurs: Campbell (−1), Maguire (+1), Schniederjans (+2), Hossler (+3), McCarthy (+4), Hardy (+5),
McCoy (+8), DeChambeau (+9), Neil (+9), NeSmith (+9), Jones (+10), Knapp (+10), Yang (+10), Horsfield (+11), Riley (+13), Hammer (+21)

=== Third round ===
Saturday, June 20, 2015

Louis Oosthuizen again had the low round of the day, 66 (−4), moving him into a tie for 5th place. Despite suffering from vertigo, Jason Day scored 68 (−2), the second lowest round of the day.

The 1st hole was set as a 499-yard par-4 and the 18th hole as 577-yard par-5, with the total yardage at 7,637. The scoring average for the field was 73.13 (+3.13) and only 6 players had under-par rounds.

Place	Player	Score	To par
T1	(Australia) Jason Day	68-70-68=206	−4
T1	(South Africa) Branden Grace	69-67-70=206	−4
T1	(United States) Dustin Johnson	65-71-70=206	−4
T1	(United States) Jordan Spieth	68-67-71=206	−4
T5	(United States) J. B. Holmes	72-66-71=209	−1
T5	(Republic of Ireland) Shane Lowry	69-70-70=209	−1
T5	(South Africa) Louis Oosthuizen	77-66-66=209	−1
T5	(Australia) Cameron Smith	70-70-69=209	−1
T9	(United States) Tony Finau	69-68-74=211	+1
T9	(Netherlands) Joost Luiten	68-69-74=211	+1
T9	(United States) Patrick Reed	66-69-76=211	+1
T9	(Argentina) Andrés Romero	71-69-71=211	+1
T9	(United States) Brandt Snedeker	69-72-70=211	+1
T9	(Sweden) Henrik Stenson	65-74-72=211	+1

=== Final round ===
Sunday, June 21, 2015

Four players began the final round tied for the lead for the first time at the U.S. Open since 1973. In the final pairing with Jason Day at 3 pm PDT, Dustin Johnson recorded two birdies on the front nine to take sole possession of the lead, then lost it with bogeys on three out of four holes to begin the back nine. In the penultimate pairing, Jordan Spieth and Branden Grace both birdied the par-4 12th to tie, but Grace fell from contention on the 16th after his drive went out of bounds and he made double bogey. Spieth holed a 25-foot (8 m) birdie putt at the 16th to open up a three-stroke lead, but then three-putted for double bogey on the par-3 17th to fall into a tie with Louis Oosthuizen. Oosthuizen began the round three shots off the lead and quickly dropped further behind with three consecutive bogeys on the front-nine. Beginning at the 12th, however, Oosthuizen birdied six out of his last seven holes to tie Spieth. At the par-5 18th, Spieth hit the green in two and proceeded to two-putt for birdie. Johnson recovered from his bogey streak with a birdie at the 17th, then also found the 18th green in two. Faced with a 12-foot (3.7 m) eagle putt to win the championship, Johnson's attempt rolled three feet (0.9 m) past the hole, then missed his birdie putt to tie. Expecting a Monday playoff, Spieth suddenly gained a one-stroke victory for his second consecutive major title.

With the win, Spieth became the sixth to win both the Masters and U.S. Open in the same year and the first since Tiger Woods in 2002. He also became the first to win two majors before the age of 22 since Gene Sarazen in 1922, and the youngest U.S. Open champion since Bobby Jones in 1923. After opening with a round of 77 (+7), Oosthuizen shot 199 over his last three rounds, tying the U.S. Open record for lowest 54-hole score. His score of 29 on the back-nine also tied a tournament record.

The first hole was set as a par-4 at 443 yards (405 m) and the 18th hole as a par-5 at 601 yards (550 m), with the total at 7,384 yards (6,752 m). The scoring average for the field was 71.29 (+1.29) and 22 players had under-par rounds. Adam Scott had the low round of the championship, a 6-under-par 64 to tie for fourth.

==== Final leaderboard ====
Champion
Silver Cup winner (leading amateur)
(a) = amateur
(c) = past champion

Place	Player	Score	To par	Money ($)
1	(United States) Jordan Spieth	68-67-71-69=275	−5	1,800,000
T2	(United States) Dustin Johnson	65-71-70-70=276	−4	877,144
T2	(South Africa) Louis Oosthuizen	77-66-66-67=276	−4	877,144
T4	(South Africa) Branden Grace	69-67-70-71=277	−3	407,037
T4	(Australia) Adam Scott	70-71-72-64=277	−3	407,037
T4	(Australia) Cameron Smith	70-70-69-68=277	−3	407,037
7	(South Africa) Charl Schwartzel	73-70-69-66=278	−2	311,835
8	(United States) Brandt Snedeker	69-72-70-68=279	−1	280,482
T9	(Australia) Jason Day	68-70-68-74=280	E	235,316
T9	(Republic of Ireland) Shane Lowry	69-70-70-71=280	E	235,316
T9	(Northern Ireland) Rory McIlroy (c)	72-72-70-66=280	E	235,316

Leaderboard below the top 10
Place	Player	Score	To par	Money ($)
T12	(United States) Kevin Kisner	71-68-73-69=281	+1	192,925
T12	(United States) Matt Kuchar	67-73-72-69=281	+1	192,925
T14	(United States) Tony Finau	69-68-74-71=282	+2	156,935
T14	(United States) Patrick Reed	66-69-76-71=282	+2	156,935
T14	(Argentina) Andrés Romero	71-69-71-71=282	+2	156,935
T14	(Australia) John Senden	72-72-70-68=282	+2	156,935
T18	(United States) Charlie Beljan	69-75-69-70=283	+3	113,686
T18	(United States) Jason Dufner	68-72-73-70=283	+3	113,686
T18	(Spain) Sergio García	70-75-70-68=283	+3	113,686
T18	(United States) Brooks Koepka	72-72-70-69=283	+3	113,686
T18	(United States) Jamie Lovemark	70-68-75-70=283	+3	113,686
T18	(Japan) Hideki Matsuyama	70-71-72-70=283	+3	113,686
T18	(Australia) Geoff Ogilvy (c)	69-72-75-67=283	+3	113,686
T25	(South Africa) Thomas Aiken	74-71-73-66=284	+4	85,622
T25	(United States) Billy Horschel	72-72-73-67=284	+4	85,622
T27	(United States) Keegan Bradley	73-71-72-69=285	+5	64,126
T27	(United States) Brian Campbell (a)	67-72-78-68=285	+5	0
T27	(England) Tommy Fleetwood	74-69-73-69=285	+5	64,126
T27	(Scotland) Jimmy Gunn	72-73-70-70=285	+5	64,126
T27	(United States) Morgan Hoffmann	71-74-74-66=285	+5	64,126
T27	(United States) J. B. Holmes	72-66-71-76=285	+5	64,126
T27	(France) Alexander Lévy	70-69-73-73=285	+5	64,126
T27	(Italy) Francesco Molinari	68-73-72-72=285	+5	64,126
T27	(England) Justin Rose (c)	72-70-72-71=285	+5	64,126
T27	(Sweden) Henrik Stenson	65-74-72-74=285	+5	64,126
T27	(United States) Daniel Summerhays	70-67-78-70=285	+5	64,126
T27	(Scotland) Marc Warren	68-74-72-71=285	+5	64,126
T39	(England) Paul Casey	72-69-73-72=286	+6	47,854
T39	(United States) Troy Kelly	72-73-72-69=286	+6	47,854
T39	(Netherlands) Joost Luiten	68-69-74-75=286	+6	47,854
T42	(United States) Jim Furyk (c)	71-73-73-70=287	+7	42,946
T42	(United States) Denny McCarthy (a)	71-73-71-72=287	+7	0
T42	(United States) Ollie Schniederjans (a)	69-73-72-73=287	+7	0
T42	(United States) Robert Streb	74-70-73-70=287	+7	42,946
T46	(United States) Kevin Chappell	69-75-73-71=288	+8	37,090
T46	(Canada) Brad Fritsch	70-74-72-72=288	+8	37,090
T46	(United States) Kevin Na	70-72-72-74=288	+8	37,090
T46	(United States) Webb Simpson (c)	72-73-71-72=288	+8	37,090
T50	(United States) Sam Saunders	72-72-76-69=289	+9	31,633
T50	(England) Lee Westwood	73-69-77-70=289	+9	31,633
T52	(United States) Nick Hardy (a)	70-75-77-68=290	+10	0
T52	(United States) Ryan Palmer	74-70-73-73=290	+10	29,384
T54	(South Africa) Ernie Els (c)	72-70-76-73=291	+11	27,272
T54	(England) Ian Poulter	72-73-69-77=291	+11	27,272
T54	(United States) Mark Silvers	72-71-75-73=291	+11	27,272
T54	(United States) Cameron Tringale	75-68-74-74=291	+11	27,272
T58	(England) Luke Donald	73-71-73-75=292	+12	25,358
T58	(United States) Brad Elder	76-68-76-72=292	+12	25,358
T58	(United States) Beau Hossler (a)	71-72-73-76=292	+12	0
T58	(United States) Jack Maguire (a)	73-68-73-78=292	+12	0
T58	(United States) D. A. Points	74-71-77-70=292	+12	25,358
T58	(United States) Jimmy Walker	72-73-72-75=292	+12	25,358
T64	(Argentina) Ángel Cabrera (c)	70-75-74-74=293	+13	23,822
T64	(Australia) Marcus Fraser	71-71-77-74=293	+13	23,822
T64	(United States) Ben Martin	67-70-86-70=293	+13	23,822
T64	(United States) Phil Mickelson	69-74-77-73=293	+13	23,822
T64	(Scotland) Colin Montgomerie	69-76-72-76=293	+13	23,822
T64	(Taiwan) Pan Cheng-tsung	71-72-76-74=293	+13	23,822
T70	(South Africa) George Coetzee	72-73-72-77=294	+14	22,652
T70	(United States) Andy Pope	74-71-77-72=294	+14	22,652
T72	(United States) Zach Johnson	72-72-78-73=295	+15	22,067
T72	(England) John Parry	72-73-71-79=295	+15	22,067
74	(Colombia) Camilo Villegas	72-73-80-75=300	+20	21,628
75	(United States) Chris Kirk	70-73-80-78=301	+21	21,332
CUT	(United States) Roberto Castro	74-72=146	+6	
CUT	(Japan) Hiroyuki Fujita	72-74=146	+6	
CUT	(United States) Cody Gribble	68-78=146	+6	
CUT	(United States) Bill Haas	73-73=146	+6	
CUT	(United States) Charley Hoffman	76-70=146	+6	
CUT	(Germany) Martin Kaymer (c)	72-74=146	+6	
CUT	(South Africa) Garth Mulroy	74-72=146	+6	
CUT	(Germany) Marcel Siem	73-73=146	+6	
CUT	(England) Andy Sullivan	72-74=146	+6	
CUT	(United States) Jason Allred	74-73=147	+7	
CUT	(France) Victor Dubuisson	74-73=147	+7	
CUT	(Canada) David Hearn	72-75=147	+7	
CUT	(United States) Tom Hoge	73-74=147	+7	
CUT	(Japan) Masahiro Kawamura	70-77=147	+7	
CUT	(India) Anirban Lahiri	75-72=147	+7	
CUT	(China) Liang Wenchong	73-74=147	+7	
CUT	(United States) Hunter Mahan	73-74=147	+7	
CUT	(United States) Timothy O'Neal	74-73=147	+7	
CUT	(United States) Michael Putnam	70-77=147	+7	
CUT	(United States) Bubba Watson	70-77=147	+7	
CUT	(Austria) Bernd Wiesberger	72-75=147	+7	
CUT	(South Africa) Retief Goosen (c)	77-71=148	+8	
CUT	(United States) Brian Harman	69-79=148	+8	
CUT	(United States) Russell Henley	71-77=148	+8	
CUT	(Thailand) Thongchai Jaidee	71-77=148	+8	
CUT	(Spain) Miguel Ángel Jiménez	69-79=148	+8	
CUT	(United States) Kevin Lucas	74-74=148	+8	
CUT	(United States) Matt Mabrey	74-74=148	+8	
CUT	(United States) Lee McCoy (a)	74-74=148	+8	
CUT	(Northern Ireland) Graeme McDowell (c)	74-74=148	+8	
CUT	(Sweden) Alex Norén	73-75=148	+8	
CUT	(South Korea) An Byeong-hun	73-76=149	+9	
CUT	(United States) Bryson DeChambeau (a)	74-75=149	+9	
CUT	(Japan) Ryo Ishikawa	74-75=149	+9	
CUT	(United States) Lee Janzen (c)	73-76=149	+9	
CUT	(India) Shiv Kapur	72-77=149	+9	
CUT	(United States) George McNeill	75-74=149	+9	
CUT	(United States) Ryan Moore	75-74=149	+9	
CUT	(Scotland) Bradley Neil (a)	76-73=149	+9	
CUT	(United States) Matthew NeSmith (a)	76-73=149	+9	
CUT	(England) Jason Palmer	76-73=149	+9	
CUT	(United States) Bo Van Pelt	73-76=149	+9	
CUT	(England) Danny Willett	72-77=149	+9	
CUT	(United States) Jared Becher	78-72=150	+10	
CUT	(Denmark) Lucas Bjerregaard	73-77=150	+10	
CUT	(United States) Erik Compton	76-74=150	+10	
CUT	(United States) Tyler Duncan	78-72=150	+10	
CUT	(Wales) Oliver Farr	73-77=150	+10	
CUT	(Scotland) Stephen Gallacher	78-72=150	+10	
CUT	(United States) Kyle Jones (a)	78-72=150	+10	
CUT	(United States) Jake Knapp (a)	74-76=150	+10	
CUT	(Australia) Marc Leishman	73-77=150	+10	
CUT	(United States) Steve Marino	75-75=150	+10	
CUT	(South Africa) Tjaart van der Walt	77-73=150	+10	
CUT	(South Korea) Gunn Yang (a)	74-76=150	+10	
CUT	(United States) Blayne Barber	78-73=151	+11	
CUT	(Wales) Jamie Donaldson	74-77=151	+11	
CUT	(United States) Brandon Hagy	74-77=151	+11	
CUT	(England) Sam Horsfield (a)	75-76=151	+11	
CUT	(Japan) Shunsuke Sonoda	78-73=151	+11	
CUT	(United States) Gary Woodland	74-77=151	+11	
CUT	(United States) Michael Davan	77-75=152	+12	
CUT	(United States) Billy Hurley III	80-72=152	+12	
CUT	(New Zealand) Danny Lee	78-74=152	+12	
CUT	(Australia) Kurt Barnes	72-81=153	+13	
CUT	(United States) Davis Riley (a)	73-80=153	+13	
CUT	(United States) Brendon Todd	78-75=153	+13	
CUT	(United States) Rickie Fowler	81-73=154	+14	
CUT	(Germany) Stephan Jäger	74-80=154	+14	
CUT	(United States) Richard H. Lee	74-80=154	+14	
CUT	(United States) Josh Persons	79-75=154	+14	
CUT	(United States) Rich Berberian Jr.	83-72=155	+15	
CUT	(Denmark) Sebastian Cappelen	70-85=155	+15	
CUT	(United States) Pat Wilson	79-76=155	+15	
CUT	(South Korea) Baek Seuk-hyun	74-82=156	+16	
CUT	(United States) Lucas Glover (c)	73-83=156	+16	
CUT	(United States) Tiger Woods (c)	80-76=156	+16	
CUT	(Northern Ireland) Darren Clarke	77-80=157	+17	
CUT	(United States) Cole Hammer (a)	77-84=161	+21	
CUT	(United States) Alex Kim	80-86=166	+26	
WD	(United States) Matt Every	78	+8	

==== Scorecard ====
Hole	1	2	3	4	5	6	7	8	9	10	11	12	13	14	15	16	17	18
Par	4	4	3	4	4	4	4	5	3	4	4	4	4	4	3	4	3	5
(United States) Spieth	−3	−3	−3	−3	−3	−3	−3	−4	−4	−4	−4	−5	−5	−5	−5	−6	−4	−5
(United States) Johnson	−4	−4	−4	−5	−5	−5	−5	−6	−6	−5	−4	−4	−3	−3	−3	−3	−4	−4
(South Africa) Oosthuizen	−1	E	+1	+2	+2	+2	+2	+2	+2	+2	+2	+1	E	−1	−2	−3	−3	−4
(South Africa) Grace	−4	−4	−4	−3	−3	−3	−3	−3	−4	−4	−4	−5	−5	−5	−5	−3	−3	−3
(Australia) Scott	+3	+2	+2	+2	+2	+2	+1	E	E	E	−1	−1	−1	−1	−1	−2	−2	−3
(Australia) Smith	E	−1	−1	E	E	E	E	−1	−1	−1	E	−1	−1	−1	E	−1	−1	−3
(South Africa) Schwartzel	+2	+2	+3	+4	+3	+3	+2	+2	+2	+2	+1	E	E	−1	−1	−1	−1	−2
(United States) Snedeker	+1	+2	+2	+2	+2	+1	E	−1	−2	−2	−1	−1	−1	+1	+1	E	E	−1
(Australia) Day	−4	−4	−4	−3	−4	−3	−2	−3	−3	−2	−2	−2	E	E	E	−1	E	E
(Republic of Ireland) Lowry	−1	−1	E	E	+1	E	+1	E	+1	E	E	−1	E	E	E	−1	−1	E
(Northern Ireland) McIlroy	+4	+3	+3	+3	+3	+3	+2	+1	+1	E	E	−1	−2	−2	−1	−1	E	E

Cumulative tournament scores, relative to par

Eagle	Birdie	Bogey	Double bogey

== Media ==
This was the first U.S. Open televised by Fox Sports, which began a 12-year contract to televise the championship and other USGA events. The previous 20 years (1995–2014) had been by NBC Sports, preceded by 29 years (1966–1994) on ABC Sports.
