= Charlie Danielson =

American professional golfer

Personal information
- Full name: Charles Danielson
- Nationality: United States
- Born: January 16, 1994 (age 32) Osceola, Wisconsin, U.S.
- Height: 6 ft 5 in (196 cm)
- Weight: 185 lb (84 kg)

Career
- Sport: Golf
- College: University of Illinois
- Turned professional: 2016
- Current tour: Korn Ferry Tour
- Former tour: PGA Tour Canada

Best results in major championships
- Masters Tournament: DNP
- PGA Championship: DNP
- U.S. Open: T58: 2019
- The Open Championship: DNP

Charlie Danielson (born January 16, 1994) is an American professional golfer, who played on the Korn Ferry Tour before serious knee injuries forced him to step away. He was a highly ranked amateur golfer before turning professional in 2016.

== Early life ==
Danielson was born in Osceola, Wisconsin in 1994, to parents Craig and Liz Danielson. Danielson and his two sisters, Lindsay and Casey, were coached by their father. Danielson started golf at a young age. While in high school, he won the Wisconsin State High School Golf Championships in 2010 and 2012.

== University of Illinois ==
Danielson studied Business Management at the University of Illinois from 2012 to 2016. In 2014, he won the individual Big Ten Championship and was runner-up in 2016. He was a four-time All-American, named a second team in 2015, and first team in 2016. While he was attending the University of Illinois, the team enjoyed great success, winning the Big Ten Championship three of four years and placing second in the NCAA Championship in 2013. He represented the United States in the Palmer Cup in 2016.

== Professional career ==
Danielson turned professional in 2016, when he competed in two PGA Tour events, making the cut in both. In 2017, Danielson played on the PGA Tour Canada, but was burdened by a knee injury that ultimately required surgery and cost him the entire 2018 season. In 2019, Danielson continued his play on the PGA Tour Canada and qualified for the 2019 U.S. Open by winning a local qualifying event in Minnesota, and finishing in qualifying position in a sectional qualifying event in Dallas. Danielson, in his second U.S. Open, finished tied for 58th place. He followed up his week at Pebble Beach, with Top-15 finishes on the PGA Tour at the 3M Open and Barracuda Championship.

== Results in major championships ==
Tournament	2016	2017	2018
Masters Tournament			
U.S. Open	CUT		
The Open Championship			
PGA Championship			

Tournament	2019
Masters Tournament	
PGA Championship	
U.S. Open	T58
The Open Championship	

Did not play

CUT = missed the half-way cut
"T" = tied

== U.S. national team appearances ==
Amateur

- Palmer Cup: 2016
