= Jack Maguire (golfer) =

American professional golfer (born 1994)

Personal information
- Nationality: United States
- Born: July 6, 1994 (age 32)

Career
- Sport: Golf
- College: Florida State University
- Turned professional: 2016
- Current tour: Web.com Tour

Best results in major championships
- Masters Tournament: DNP
- PGA Championship: DNP
- U.S. Open: T42: 2017
- The Open Championship: DNP

Jack Maguire (born July 6, 1994) is an American professional golfer.

== Amateur career ==
Maguire played college golf at Florida State University, where he won two events in his freshman year. His 70.78 scoring average is the lowest in Seminoles program history.

Maguire also holds the record for lowest round in Florida State history with a 10 under 62 at the USF Invitational.

== Professional career ==
Maguire qualified for the 2015 U.S. Open by earning medalist honors at sectional qualifying in Jupiter, Florida along with Luke Donald and Andy Pope. He finished tied for 58th at the tournament.

Maguire made his professional debut at the 2016 Phoenix Open. He missed the cut, despite making a hole-in-one on TPC Scottsdale's 12th hole during his second round. He played the rest of 2016 on the Web.com Tour, finishing 47th, which allowed him to retain full Web.com Tour status for 2017. In 2017, Maguire finished 93rd on the Web.com Tour and lost his exempt status. Following 2018, he advanced through qualifying school and then finished T-34 in the Web.com Tour qualifying tournament, where the top-40 and ties gained tour status.

== Amateur wins ==
- 2012 St Augustine Amateur
- 2014 USF Invitational, Mason Rudolph Championship

== Results in major championships ==
Tournament	2015	2016	2017
Masters Tournament			
U.S. Open	T58		T42
The Open Championship			
PGA Championship			

Did not play

CUT = missed the half-way cut
"T" = tied for place

== U.S. national team appearances ==
Amateur

- Palmer Cup: 2014, 2015 (winners)
