= Andy Pope =

American professional golfer

Personal information
- Nationality: United States
- Born: March 3, 1984 (age 42) Glen Ellyn, Illinois, U.S.
- Height: 5 ft 10 in (178 cm)
- Weight: 160 lb (73 kg)
- Spouse: Jacklyn Pope (m. 2013)
- Children: Tommy, Nicholas

Career
- Sport: Golf
- College: Xavier University
- Turned professional: 2006
- Former tour: Korn Ferry Tour
- Professional wins: 1

Best results in major championships
- Masters Tournament: DNP
- PGA Championship: DNP
- U.S. Open: T58: 2019
- The Open Championship: DNP

Andy Pope (born March 3, 1984) is an American professional golfer.

== Career ==
Pope was born in Glen Ellyn, Illinois. He played college golf at Xavier University and graduated in 2006. Individually, in 2003 he was Atlantic 10 Conference runner-up and in 2004 he was conference champion - in 2003 and 2005 he was part of a team championship.

Pope has played on the Web.com Tour since 2012 with a best finish of T-6 at the 2012 Mexico Open.

Pope finished tied for 70th at the 2015 U.S. Open. He qualified for the tournament by earning medalist honors at sectional qualifying in Jupiter, Florida along with Luke Donald and Jack Maguire.

== Professional wins (1) ==
- 2022 Florida Open

== Results in major championships ==
Results not in chronological order in 2020.

Tournament	2015	2016	2017	2018
Masters Tournament				
U.S. Open	T70	CUT	CUT	
The Open Championship				
PGA Championship				

Tournament	2019	2020	2021
Masters Tournament			
PGA Championship			
U.S. Open	T58		CUT
The Open Championship		NT	

Did not play

CUT = missed the half-way cut
"T" indicates a tie for a place
NT = No tournament due to COVID-19 pandemic
