= 2017 Masters Tournament =

- Front cover of the 2017 Masters Journal, featuring a tribute to Arnold Palmer who died the previous year.

Tournament information
- Dates: April 6–9, 2017
- Location: Augusta, Georgia, U.S. 33.503°N 82.020°W
- Course: Augusta National Golf Club
- Tours: PGA Tour; European Tour; Japan Golf Tour

Statistics
- Par: 72
- Length: 7,435 yards (6,799 m)
- Field: 93 players, 53 after cut
- Cut: 150 (+6)
- Prize fund: $11,000,000
- Winner's share: $1,980,000

Champion
- (Spain) Sergio García
- 279 (−9), playoff

Location map
- Location in the United States Location in Georgia

The 2017 Masters Tournament was the 81st edition of the Masters Tournament and the first of golf's four major championships in 2017. It was held April 6–9 at Augusta National Golf Club in Augusta, Georgia.

Sergio García defeated Justin Rose in a sudden-death playoff, after they both completed the 72 holes in nine-under-par. This was his first major title, which came in his 74th attempt. Previously, García had 22 top-ten finishes in majors (including three at the Masters, the best a tie for fourth in 2004). He was the first Spaniard to win at Augusta in eighteen years, since José María Olazábal in 1999.

== Course ==
Hole	Name	Yards	Par	Hole	Name	Yards	Par
1	Tea Olive	445	4	10	Camellia	495	4
2	Pink Dogwood	575	5	11	White Dogwood	505	4
3	Flowering Peach	350	4	12	Golden Bell	155	3
4	Flowering Crab Apple	240	3	13	Azalea	510	5
5	Magnolia	455	4	14	Chinese Fir	440	4
6	Juniper	180	3	15	Firethorn	530	5
7	Pampas	450	4	16	Redbud	170	3
8	Yellow Jasmine	570	5	17	Nandina	440	4
9	Carolina Cherry	460	4	18	Holly	465	4
Out		3,725	36	In		3,710	36
Source:				Total		7,435	72

== Field ==
The Masters has the smallest field of the four major championships. Officially, the Masters remains an invitation event, but there is a set of qualifying criteria that determines who is included in the field. Each player is classified according to the first category by which he qualified, with other categories in which he qualified shown in parentheses.

Golfers who qualify based solely on their performance in amateur tournaments (categories 7–11) must remain amateurs on the starting day of the tournament to be eligible to play.

1. Past Masters Champions

- Ángel Cabrera
- Fred Couples
- Trevor Immelman
- Zach Johnson (3,18,19)
- Bernhard Langer
- Sandy Lyle
- Phil Mickelson (3,14,17,18,19)
- Larry Mize
- José María Olazábal
- Mark O'Meara
- Charl Schwartzel (17,18,19)
- Adam Scott (17,18,19)
- Vijay Singh
- Jordan Spieth (2,12,16,17,18,19)
- Bubba Watson (17,18,19)
- Mike Weir
- Danny Willett (12,18,19)
- Ian Woosnam
- Tiger Woods withdrew due to a back injury.
- The following past champions did not enter: Tommy Aaron, Jack Burke Jr., Charles Coody, Ben Crenshaw, Nick Faldo, Raymond Floyd, Doug Ford, Bob Goalby, Jack Nicklaus, Gary Player, Craig Stadler, Tom Watson, Fuzzy Zoeller.

2. Winners of the last five U.S. Opens

- Martin Kaymer (5,19)
- Justin Rose (6,12,18,19)
- Webb Simpson
- Dustin Johnson (12,13,16,17,18,19) withdrew after sustaining a back injury the day before the tournament.

3. Winners of the last five British Opens

- Ernie Els
- Rory McIlroy (4,12,16,17,18,19)
- Henrik Stenson (14,18,19)

4. Winners of the last five PGA Championships

- Jason Day (5,12,15,16,17,18,19)
- Jason Dufner (17)
- Jimmy Walker (15,17,18,19)

5. Winners of the last three Players Championships

- Rickie Fowler (16,18,19)

6. Winner of the 2016 Olympic Golf Tournament

- Eligible under category 2

7. Top two finishers in the 2016 U.S. Amateur

- Brad Dalke (a)
- Curtis Luck (a,9)

8. Winner of the 2016 Amateur Championship

- Scott Gregory (a)

9. Winner of the 2016 Asia-Pacific Amateur Championship

- Eligible under category 7

10. Winner of the 2017 Latin America Amateur Championship

- Toto Gana (a)

11. Winner of the 2016 U.S. Mid-Amateur

- Stewart Hagestad (a)

12. The top 12 finishers and ties in the 2016 Masters Tournament

- Daniel Berger (16,17,18,19)
- Paul Casey (17,18,19)
- Matt Fitzpatrick (18,19)
- J. B. Holmes (14,17,18,19)
- Søren Kjeldsen (18)
- Hideki Matsuyama (15,16,17,18,19)
- Brandt Snedeker (17,18,19)
- Lee Westwood (18)

13. Top 4 finishers and ties in the 2016 U.S. Open

- Jim Furyk (18)
- Shane Lowry (18)
- Scott Piercy (18,19)

14. Top 4 finishers and ties in the 2016 British Open Championship

- Steve Stricker

15. Top 4 finishers and ties in the 2016 PGA Championship

- Branden Grace (16,18,19)
- Brooks Koepka (18,19)
- Daniel Summerhays

16. Winners of PGA Tour events that award a full-point allocation for the FedEx Cup, between the 2016 Masters Tournament and the 2017 Masters Tournament

- Sergio García (18,19)
- Adam Hadwin (19)
- James Hahn
- Russell Henley
- Charley Hoffman
- Mackenzie Hughes
- Billy Hurley III
- Kim Si-woo (17)
- Russell Knox (17,18,19)
- Marc Leishman (19)
- William McGirt (17,18)
- Ryan Moore (17,18,19)
- Rod Pampling
- Pat Perez
- Jon Rahm (19)
- Patrick Reed (17,18,19)
- Brendan Steele
- Brian Stuard
- Hudson Swafford
- Justin Thomas (17,18,19)
- Jhonattan Vegas (17)

17. All players qualifying for the 2016 edition of the Tour Championship

- Roberto Castro
- Kevin Chappell (18,19)
- Emiliano Grillo (18,19)
- Kevin Kisner (19)
- Matt Kuchar (18,19)
- Kevin Na (18)
- Sean O'Hair
- Gary Woodland (18,19)

18. Top 50 on the final 2016 Official World Golf Ranking list

- An Byeong-hun
- Rafa Cabrera-Bello (19)
- Bill Haas (19)
- Tyrrell Hatton (19)
- Yuta Ikeda (19)
- Francesco Molinari (19)
- Alex Norén (19)
- Louis Oosthuizen (19)
- Thomas Pieters (19)
- Andy Sullivan
- Bernd Wiesberger (19)
- Chris Wood

19. Top 50 on the Official World Golf Ranking list on March 27

- Ross Fisher
- Tommy Fleetwood
- Hideto Tanihara
- Wang Jeung-hun

20. International invitees

- None

All five amateurs were appearing in their first Masters, as were fourteen professionals: Tommy Fleetwood, Adam Hadwin, Tyrrell Hatton, Mackenzie Hughes, Billy Hurley III, Kim Si-woo, William McGirt, Alex Norén, Thomas Pieters, Jon Rahm, Brian Stuard, Daniel Summerhays, Hudson Swafford, and Wang Jeung-hun. All the professionals, and Scott Gregory, had previously appeared in a major.

== Par 3 contest ==
Wednesday, April 5, 2017

Heavy rain forced the cancellation of the Par-3 contest for the first time in its history. Mike Weir recorded the only hole-in-one before play was suspended.

== Round summaries ==
=== First round ===
Thursday, April 6, 2017

After being one-over after five holes, Charley Hoffman birdied eight of his next twelve holes for 65 (−7). His four-stroke advantage after the first round was the largest at the Masters since 1955.

Place	Player	Score	To par
1	(United States) Charley Hoffman	65	−7
2	(United States) William McGirt	69	−3
3	(England) Lee Westwood	70	−2
T4	(United States) Kevin Chappell	71	−1
T4	(United States) Jason Dufner	71	−1
T4	(England) Matt Fitzpatrick	71	−1
T4	(Spain) Sergio García	71	−1
T4	(United States) Russell Henley	71	−1
T4	(United States) Phil Mickelson	71	−1
T4	(England) Justin Rose	71	−1
T4	(England) Andy Sullivan	71	−1

=== Second round ===
Friday, April 7, 2017

Charley Hoffman fell back to the pack with 75 and into a four-way tie for the lead at 140 (−4). Rickie Fowler had four birdies and an eagle on his way to a round of 67 (−5), the lowest score of the round, and tied for the lead along with Sergio García and Thomas Pieters. García was originally credited with a triple-bogey seven on the 10th, but his score was later corrected to a five. Fifteen players were within five shots of the lead, including past champions Fred Couples, Phil Mickelson, Adam Scott, and Jordan Spieth. Amateur Stewart Hagestad became the first U.S. Mid-Amateur champion to make the cut at the Masters since the winner of that tournament was granted entry in 1989.

Place	Player	Score	To par
T1	(United States) Rickie Fowler	73-67=140	−4
T1	(Spain) Sergio García	71-69=140	−4
T1	(United States) Charley Hoffman	65-75=140	−4
T1	(Belgium) Thomas Pieters	72-68=140	−4
5	(United States) William McGirt	69-73=142	−2
T6	(United States) Fred Couples	73-70=143	−1
T6	(United States) Ryan Moore	74-69=143	−1
T6	(Spain) Jon Rahm	73-70=143	−1
T6	(England) Justin Rose	71-72=143	−1
T10	(United States) Phil Mickelson	71-73=144	E
T10	(Australia) Adam Scott	75-69=144	E
T10	(United States) Jordan Spieth	75-69=144	E

Amateurs: Hagestad (+3), Luck (+6), Dalke (+9), Gregory (+13), Gana (+17)

=== Third round ===
Saturday, April 8, 2017

Justin Rose birdied five of his final seven holes for 67 (−5), the lowest of the round, and tied Sergio García for the lead. Charley Hoffman held solo possession of the lead before a bogey at 14 and double-bogey at 16 after hitting his tee shot in the water, finishing two shots behind. Jordan Spieth was five-under on his round and within a shot of the lead until a bogey at 18 tied him with Hoffman.

Place	Player	Score	To par
T1	(Spain) Sergio García	71-69-70=210	−6
T1	(England) Justin Rose	71-72-67=210	−6
3	(United States) Rickie Fowler	73-67-71=211	−5
T4	(United States) Charley Hoffman	65-75-72=212	−4
T4	(United States) Ryan Moore	74-69-69=212	−4
T4	(United States) Jordan Spieth	75-69-68=212	−4
7	(Australia) Adam Scott	75-69-69=213	−3
8	(South Africa) Charl Schwartzel	74-72-68=214	−2
T9	(Belgium) Thomas Pieters	72-68-75=215	−1
T9	(England) Lee Westwood	70-77-68=215	−1

Amateurs: Hagestad (+5), Luck (+9)

=== Final round ===
Sunday, April 9, 2017

==== Summary ====
External videos
- Full final round coverage on CBS on YouTube

Sergio García birdied two of his first three holes to open up a three-shot lead. Starting at the 6th, Justin Rose recorded three consecutive birdies to tie; with bogeys by García at the 10th and 11th, Rose went ahead by two shots. At the 13th, García was forced to take a drop when his tee shot found the trees, but was able to get up and down to save par while Rose missed his birdie attempt. García made birdie at the 14th to get within one and hit his approach to the par-5 15th to fourteen feet (4.3 m). After converting the eagle attempt, he once again tied Rose, who made birdie. On the par-3 16th, both hit approaches to within eight feet (2.4 m), and Rose made his birdie from 7 feet, while García missed his gimme three-footer. At the 17th, however, Rose found the greenside bunker and suffered a bogey while Garcia two-putted for par, once again tying for the lead heading to the last hole. Rose missed a seven-footer for birdie, while García missed from three feet (0.91 m) to win the championship, forcing a sudden-death playoff.

Charl Schwartzel, the 2011 champion, had four birdies on the back-nine for 68 (−4) and third place, three shots behind García and Rose. Thomas Pieters also shot 68 after making four straight birdies on holes 12–15 and tied for fourth place. Matt Kuchar birdied three consecutive holes on his final nine, then made a hole-in-one at 16 to equal the lowest score of the round with 67 and tied Pieters. Rickie Fowler began the round a shot out of the lead, but seven bogeys yielded a 76 (+4) and dropped him to eleventh, while 2015 champion Jordan Spieth, two back at the start of the round, shot 75 and tied Fowler. (He was six-over for the round and then birdied three of the last four.) Charley Hoffman carded 41 on the final nine for 78 and tied for 22nd place.

After García took his drop on 13, some TV viewers reported the possibility that he caused his ball to move while removing some pine straw near his ball. Prior to the conclusion of the round Masters Officials determined there was no penalty. Per Rule 18-2 (Decision 18/4) even if high definition TV camera evidence shows movement, there is no penalty if it is deemed that the movement was not reasonably discernible to the naked eye at the time.

==== Final leaderboard ====
Champion
Silver Cup winner (low amateur)
(a) = amateur
(c) = past champion

Top 10
Place	Player	Score	To par	Money (US$)
T1	(Spain) Sergio García	71-69-70-69=279	−9	Playoff
T1	(England) Justin Rose	71-72-67-69=279	−9	Playoff
3	(South Africa) Charl Schwartzel (c)	74-72-68-68=282	−6	748,000
T4	(United States) Matt Kuchar	72-73-71-67=283	−5	484,000
T4	(Belgium) Thomas Pieters	72-68-75-68=283	−5	484,000
6	(England) Paul Casey	72-75-69-68=284	−4	396,000
T7	(United States) Kevin Chappell	71-76-70-68=285	−3	354,750
T7	(Northern Ireland) Rory McIlroy	72-73-71-69=285	−3	354,750
T9	(United States) Ryan Moore	74-69-69-74=286	−2	308,000
T9	(Australia) Adam Scott (c)	75-69-69-73=286	−2	308,000

Leaderboard below the top 10
Place	Player	Score	To par	Money ($)
T11	(United States) Rickie Fowler	73-67-71-76=287	−1	233,200
T11	(United States) Russell Henley	71-76-71-69=287	−1	233,200
T11	(United States) Brooks Koepka	74-73-71-69=287	−1	233,200
T11	(Japan) Hideki Matsuyama	76-70-74-67=287	−1	233,200
T11	(United States) Jordan Spieth (c)	75-69-68-75=287	−1	233,200
T16	(Germany) Martin Kaymer	78-68-74-68=288	E	181,500
T16	(United States) Steve Stricker	75-73-72-68=288	E	181,500
T18	(United States) Fred Couples (c)	73-70-74-72=289	+1	148,500
T18	(United States) Pat Perez	74-74-70-71=289	+1	148,500
T18	(United States) Jimmy Walker	76-71-70-72=289	+1	148,500
T18	(England) Lee Westwood	70-77-68-74=289	+1	148,500
T22	(Australia) Jason Day	74-76-69-71=290	+2	105,600
T22	(United States) Charley Hoffman	65-75-72-78=290	+2	105,600
T22	(United States) William McGirt	69-73-74-74=290	+2	105,600
T22	(United States) Phil Mickelson (c)	71-73-74-72=290	+2	105,600
T22	(United States) Justin Thomas	73-76-71-70=290	+2	105,600
T27	(United States) Daniel Berger	77-73-72-69=291	+3	78,100
T27	(South Africa) Branden Grace	76-74-71-70=291	+3	78,100
T27	(Spain) Jon Rahm	73-70-73-75=291	+3	78,100
T27	(United States) Brandt Snedeker	75-74-69-73=291	+3	78,100
T27	(United States) Brendan Steele	74-73-75-69=291	+3	78,100
32	(England) Matt Fitzpatrick	71-78-73-70=292	+4	68,200
T33	(South Korea) An Byeong-hun	76-73-74-70=293	+5	62,150
T33	(United States) Jason Dufner	71-76-70-76=293	+5	62,150
T33	(Italy) Francesco Molinari	78-72-71-72=293	+5	62,150
T36	(United States) Bill Haas	75-72-71-76=294	+6	52,938
T36	(Canada) Adam Hadwin	75-74-75-70=294	+6	52,938
T36	(United States) Stewart Hagestad (a)	74-73-74-73=294	+6	0
T36	(Denmark) Søren Kjeldsen	72-73-71-78=294	+6	52,938
T36	(United States) Brian Stuard	77-70-74-73=294	+6	52,938
T41	(England) Ross Fisher	76-74-74-71=295	+7	46,200
T41	(South Africa) Louis Oosthuizen	77-71-76-71=295	+7	46,200
T43	(United States) Kevin Kisner	74-75-74-73=296	+8	40,700
T43	(Australia) Marc Leishman	73-74-78-71=296	+8	40,700
T43	(Austria) Bernd Wiesberger	77-72-76-71=296	+8	40,700
T46	(Australia) Curtis Luck (a)	78-72-75-72=297	+9	0
T46	(United States) Daniel Summerhays	74-75-75-73=297	+9	36,300
T48	(United States) James Hahn	75-75-75-73=298	+10	33,000
T48	(England) Andy Sullivan	71-78-76-73=298	+10	33,000
50	(United States) J. B. Holmes	78-72-73-76=299	+11	30,140
51	(Argentina) Emiliano Grillo	79-70-73-78=300	+12	28,600
52	(United States) Larry Mize (c)	74-76-79-76=305	+17	27,720
53	(South Africa) Ernie Els	72-75-83-78=308	+20	27,060
CUT	(United States) Jim Furyk	78-73=151	+7	
CUT	(United States) Billy Hurley III	75-76=151	+7	
CUT	(Japan) Yuta Ikeda	74-77=151	+7	
CUT	(United States) Zach Johnson (c)	77-74=151	+7	
CUT	(Republic of Ireland) Shane Lowry	72-79=151	+7	
CUT	(United States) Kevin Na	76-75=151	+7	
CUT	(England) Danny Willett (c)	73-78=151	+7	
CUT	(England) Chris Wood	74-77=151	+7	
CUT	(Spain) Rafa Cabrera-Bello	75-77=152	+8	
CUT	(England) Tommy Fleetwood	78-74=152	+8	
CUT	(Scotland) Russell Knox	76-76=152	+8	
CUT	(Sweden) Alex Norén	74-78=152	+8	
CUT	(Australia) Rod Pampling	74-78=152	+8	
CUT	(United States) Scott Piercy	73-79=152	+8	
CUT	(United States) Webb Simpson	75-77=152	+8	
CUT	(Sweden) Henrik Stenson	77-75=152	+8	
CUT	(United States) Bubba Watson (c)	74-78=152	+8	
CUT	(United States) Brad Dalke (a)	78-75=153	+9	
CUT	(Germany) Bernhard Langer (c)	75-78=153	+9	
CUT	(United States) Sean O'Hair	76-77=153	+9	
CUT	(Spain) José María Olazábal (c)	77-76=153	+9	
CUT	(United States) Patrick Reed	76-77=153	+9	
CUT	(Fiji) Vijay Singh (c)	78-75=153	+9	
CUT	(United States) Hudson Swafford	77-76=153	+9	
CUT	(Argentina) Ángel Cabrera (c)	79-75=154	+10	
CUT	(Venezuela) Jhonattan Vegas	78-76=154	+10	
CUT	(Wales) Ian Woosnam (c)	76-78=154	+10	
CUT	(South Africa) Trevor Immelman (c)	79-76=155	+11	
CUT	(Canada) Mike Weir (c)	76-79=155	+11	
CUT	(United States) Gary Woodland	75-80=155	+11	
CUT	(South Korea) Kim Si-woo	75-81=156	+12	
CUT	(United States) Mark O'Meara (c)	78-78=156	+12	
CUT	(Japan) Hideto Tanihara	76-80=156	+12	
CUT	(South Korea) Wang Jeung-hun	78-78=156	+12	
CUT	(United States) Roberto Castro	79-78=157	+13	
CUT	(England) Scott Gregory (a)	82-75=157	+13	
CUT	(England) Tyrrell Hatton	80-78=158	+14	
CUT	(Canada) Mackenzie Hughes	79-80=159	+15	
CUT	(Scotland) Sandy Lyle (c)	77-83=160	+16	
CUT	(Chile) Toto Gana (a)	81-80=161	+17	

==== Scorecard ====
Hole	1	2	3	4	5	6	7	8	9	10	11	12	13	14	15	16	17	18
Par	4	5	4	3	4	3	4	5	4	4	4	3	5	4	5	3	4	4
(Spain) García	−7	−7	−8	−8	−8	−8	−8	−8	−8	−7	−6	−6	−6	−7	−9	−9	−9	−9
(England) Rose	−6	−6	−6	−6	−5	−6	−7	−8	−8	−8	−8	−8	−8	−8	−9	−10	−9	−9
(South Africa) Schwartzel	−2	−3	−2	−2	−2	−2	−2	−2	−3	−3	−4	−4	−5	−4	−5	−5	−5	−6
(United States) Kuchar	+1	E	+1	+1	+1	E	−1	−1	E	E	E	−1	−2	−3	−3	−5	−5	−5
(Belgium) Pieters	−1	−2	−2	−1	−1	−1	−1	−2	−2	−2	−2	−3	−4	−5	−6	−5	−5	−5
(United States) Fowler	−5	−5	−6	−5	−4	−4	−4	−5	−5	−5	−4	−3	−4	−4	−4	−3	−2	−1
(United States) Spieth	−3	−4	−3	−3	−3	−2	−2	−2	−2	−1	−1	+1	+1	+2	+1	E	E	−1

Cumulative tournament scores, relative to par

Eagle	Birdie	Bogey	Double bogey

=== Playoff ===
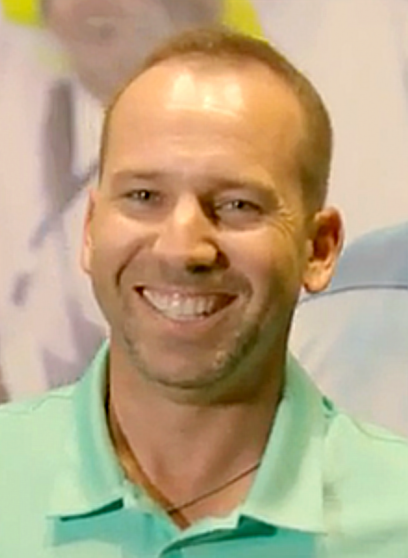
Sergio García won his first Masters title

The sudden-death playoff began at the par four 18th; Rose's drive found the trees and he was forced to chip out. García's drive was in the fairway and he hit his approach to twelve feet (3.7 m), while Rose was fourteen feet (4.3 m) away for par. Rose missed the putt, giving García two putts to win the championship, but he converted the birdie to win his first major championship. The win came in García's 19th Masters appearance and 74th major, the most by any player before their first title.

Place	Player	Score	To par	Money ($)
1	(Spain) Sergio García	3	−1	1,980,000
2	(England) Justin Rose	5	+1	1,188,000
