= 2015 Masters Tournament =

American golf tournament held in 2015

Tournament information
- Dates: April 9–12, 2015
- Location: Augusta, Georgia, U.S. 33.503°N 82.020°W
- Course: Augusta National Golf Club
- Tours: PGA Tour; European Tour; Japan Golf Tour

Statistics
- Par: 72
- Length: 7,435 yards (6,799 m)
- Field: 97 players (55 after cut)
- Cut: 146 (+2)
- Prize fund: US$10,000,000
- Winner's share: $1,800,000

Champion
- (United States) Jordan Spieth
- 270 (−18)
- Location in the United States Location in Georgia

The 2015 Masters Tournament was the 79th Masters Tournament, and the first of golf's four major championships, held April 9–12 at Augusta National Golf Club in Augusta, Georgia. Jordan Spieth led wire-to-wire and shot a record-tying 270 (−18) to win his first major at the age of 21, four strokes ahead of runners-up Phil Mickelson and Justin Rose, both major champions.

This was the final Masters appearance for two-time champion Ben Crenshaw.

== Course ==
Hole	Name	Yards	Par	Hole	Name	Yards	Par
1	Tea Olive	445	4	10	Camellia	495	4
2	Pink Dogwood	575	5	11	White Dogwood	505	4
3	Flowering Peach	350	4	12	Golden Bell	155	3
4	Flowering Crab Apple	240	3	13	Azalea	510	5
5	Magnolia	455	4	14	Chinese Fir	440	4
6	Juniper	180	3	15	Firethorn	530	5
7	Pampas	450	4	16	Redbud	170	3
8	Yellow Jasmine	570	5	17	Nandina	440	4
9	Carolina Cherry	460	4	18	Holly	465	4
Out		3,725	36	In		3,710	36
Source:				Total		7,435	72

== Field ==
The Masters has the smallest field of the four major championships. Officially, the Masters remains an invitation event, but there is a set of qualifying criteria that determines who is included in the field. Each player is classified according to the first category by which he qualified, with other categories in which he qualified shown in parentheses. Golfers who qualify based solely on their performance in amateur tournaments (categories 6–11) must remain amateurs on the starting day of the tournament to be eligible to play.

Robert Streb was the only professional in the field who was appearing in his first major. Twelve other professionals were appearing in their first Masters: Erik Compton, James Hahn, Brian Harman, Morgan Hoffmann, Brooks Koepka, Anirban Lahiri, Shane Lowry, Noh Seung-yul, Brendon Todd, Cameron Tringale, Bernd Wiesberger and Danny Willett. Mikko Ilonen and Ben Martin were appearing in their first Masters as professionals. Each of the amateurs was appearing in his first major, apart from Bradley Neil who had played in the 2014 Open Championship.

Craig Stadler was absent for the first time since 1978. The 1982 champion, he had appeared in 38 Masters, including 36 consecutively.

Two-time champion Ben Crenshaw played in his 44th and final Masters.

1. Past Masters champions

- Ángel Cabrera (16)
- Fred Couples
- Ben Crenshaw
- Trevor Immelman
- Zach Johnson (17,18,19)
- Bernhard Langer (12)
- Sandy Lyle
- Phil Mickelson (3,15,18,19)
- Larry Mize
- José María Olazábal
- Mark O'Meara
- Charl Schwartzel (18,19)
- Adam Scott (16,17,18,19)
- Vijay Singh
- Bubba Watson (12,16,17,18,19)
- Tom Watson
- Mike Weir
- Tiger Woods (5,18)
- Ian Woosnam
- The following past champions did not play: Tommy Aaron, Jack Burke Jr., Charles Coody, Nick Faldo, Raymond Floyd, Doug Ford, Bob Goalby, Jack Nicklaus, Arnold Palmer, Gary Player, Craig Stadler, Fuzzy Zoeller. Nicklaus, Palmer, and Player served as "honorary starters" and teed off on the first day at the first hole to kick off the tournament.

2. Last five U.S. Open champions

- Martin Kaymer (4,5,13,16,17,18,19)
- Graeme McDowell (18,19)
- Rory McIlroy (3,4,12,14,15,16,17,18,19)
- Justin Rose (16,17,18,19)
- Webb Simpson (17,18,19)

3. Last five Open Championship champions

- Darren Clarke
- Ernie Els
- Louis Oosthuizen (18,19)

4. Last five PGA Championship champions

- Keegan Bradley (13,18,19)
- Jason Dufner (18)

5. Last three winners of The Players Championship

- Matt Kuchar (12,16,17,18,19)

6. Top two finishers in the 2014 U.S. Amateur

- Corey Conners (a)
- Gunn Yang (a)

7. Winner of the 2014 Amateur Championship

- Bradley Neil (a)

8. Winner of the 2014 Asia-Pacific Amateur Championship

- Antonio Murdaca (a)

9. Winner of the 2015 Latin America Amateur Championship

- Matías Domínguez (a)

10. Winner of the 2014 U.S. Amateur Public Links

- Byron Meth (a)

11. Winner of the 2014 U.S. Mid-Amateur

- Scott Harvey (a)

12. The top 12 finishers and ties in the 2014 Masters Tournament

- Thomas Bjørn (18)
- Jonas Blixt
- Rickie Fowler (13,14,15,17,18,19)
- Miguel Ángel Jiménez (18)
- John Senden (17,18)
- Jordan Spieth (16,17,18,19)
- Kevin Stadler
- Jimmy Walker (16,17,18,19)
- Lee Westwood (18,19)

13. Top 4 finishers and ties in the 2014 U.S. Open

- Erik Compton
- Jason Day (16,17,18,19)
- Dustin Johnson (16,17,18,19)
- Brooks Koepka (16,18,19)
- Henrik Stenson (15,18,19)

14. Top 4 finishers and ties in the 2014 Open Championship

- Jim Furyk (17,18,19)
- Sergio García (17,18,19)

15. Top 4 finishers and ties in the 2014 PGA Championship

16. Winners of PGA Tour events that award a full-point allocation for the FedEx Cup, between the 2014 Masters Tournament and the 2015 Masters Tournament

- Bae Sang-moon
- Ben Crane
- Matt Every (19)
- Bill Haas (17,18,19)
- James Hahn
- Brian Harman
- Pádraig Harrington
- Charley Hoffman
- J. B. Holmes (19)
- Billy Horschel (17,18,19)
- Chris Kirk (17,18,19)
- Hunter Mahan (17,18,19)
- Ben Martin
- Hideki Matsuyama (17,18,19)
- Ryan Moore (18,19)
- Noh Seung-yul
- Patrick Reed (17,18,19)
- Brandt Snedeker (19)
- Robert Streb
- Kevin Streelman
- Brendon Todd (17,19)
- Camilo Villegas
- Tim Clark did not play due to elbow injury.

17. All players qualifying for the 2014 edition of The Tour Championship

- Russell Henley
- Morgan Hoffmann
- Kevin Na (18,19)
- Geoff Ogilvy
- Ryan Palmer (18,19)
- Cameron Tringale
- Gary Woodland (18,19)

18. Top 50 on the final 2014 Official World Golf Ranking list

- Luke Donald (19)
- Jamie Donaldson (19)
- Victor Dubuisson (19)
- Stephen Gallacher (19)
- Mikko Ilonen
- Thongchai Jaidee (19)
- Shane Lowry (19)
- Joost Luiten (19)
- Ian Poulter (19)
- Steve Stricker
- Danny Willett (19)
- Marc Leishman withdrew for personal reasons.

19. Top 50 on the Official World Golf Ranking list on March 30, 2015

- Paul Casey
- Branden Grace
- Anirban Lahiri
- Bernd Wiesberger

20. International invitees

- None

== Par 3 contest ==
Wednesday, April 8, 2015
Kevin Streelman won the par 3 contest on Wednesday in a playoff over Camilo Villegas, after both finished at 5-under par. Five holes-in-one were recorded, tying the record for most in one day first set in 2002. Villegas made two, while Jack Nicklaus hit his first ever hole-in-one at Augusta National. The others were recorded by Trevor Immelman and Matías Domínguez. Opting out in the previous ten years, Tiger Woods played in his first par 3 contest at the Masters since 2004.

== Round summaries ==
=== First round ===
Thursday, April 9, 2015

Jordan Spieth recorded nine birdies on his way to a round of 64 (−8), one off the course record, and a three-shot lead. Spieth is the fourth player to open the Masters with a round of 64 or better, and the first since Greg Norman shot 63 in 1996. Rory McIlroy, looking for his third consecutive win in a major and the career grand slam, opened with a round of 71 (−1), as did defending champion Bubba Watson. Four-time champion Tiger Woods, playing in his first tournament since February, shot 73 (+1).

Place	Player	Score	To par
1	(United States) Jordan Spieth	64	−8
T2	(Australia) Jason Day	67	−5
T2	(South Africa) Ernie Els	67	−5
T2	(United States) Charley Hoffman	67	−5
T2	(England) Justin Rose	67	−5
T6	(Spain) Sergio García	68	−4
T6	(United States) Russell Henley	68	−4
T8	(England) Paul Casey	69	−3
T8	(United States) Bill Haas	69	−3
T8	(United States) Ryan Palmer	69	−3
T8	(United States) Webb Simpson	69	−3

=== Second round ===
Friday, April 10, 2015

Jordan Spieth increased his lead to 5 shots after 36 holes with a bogey-free round of 66 (−6). His total of 130 established a new tournament record and tied the major championship record, while his 5-shot lead matched the Masters record for largest lead after two rounds. Dustin Johnson became the first player in Masters history to record three eagles in a round and moved into a tie for third place.

Place	Player	Score	To par
1	(United States) Jordan Spieth	64-66=130	−14
2	(United States) Charley Hoffman	67-68=135	−9
T3	(England) Paul Casey	69-68=137	−7
T3	(United States) Dustin Johnson	70-67=137	−7
T3	(England) Justin Rose	67-70=137	−7
6	(United States) Phil Mickelson	70-68=138	−6
7	(South Africa) Ernie Els	67-72=139	−5
T8	(United States) Bill Haas	69-71=140	−4
T8	(United States) Ryan Moore	74-66=140	−4
T8	(United States) Kevin Na	74-66=140	−4
T8	(United States) Kevin Streelman	70-70=140	−4

Amateurs: Conners (+5), Meth (+6), Murdaca (+7), Domínguez (+8), Harvey (+13), Neil (+13), Yang (+15)

=== Third round ===
Saturday, April 11, 2015

Jordan Spieth established a new Masters record for lowest 54-hole score after a round of 70 (−2) gave him a four-shot lead after the third round. His total of 200 broke by one stroke the record previously held by Raymond Floyd in 1976 and Tiger Woods in 1997. Spieth got as low as 18-under during the round, tying Woods for lowest score in relation to par in tournament history, before a double bogey at the 17th. Justin Rose birdied five holes on the back nine, including four in a row, to equal the best round of the day with a 67 (−5) and move into second place. Phil Mickelson also shot 67 and moved into third place.

Place	Player	Score	To par
1	(United States) Jordan Spieth	64-66-70=200	−16
2	(England) Justin Rose	67-70-67=204	−12
3	(United States) Phil Mickelson	70-68-67=205	−11
4	(United States) Charley Hoffman	67-68-71=206	−10
T5	(United States) Dustin Johnson	70-67-73=210	−6
T5	(Northern Ireland) Rory McIlroy	71-71-68=210	−6
T5	(United States) Kevin Na	74-66-70=210	−6
T5	(United States) Kevin Streelman	70-70-70=210	−6
T5	(United States) Tiger Woods	73-69-68=210	−6
T10	(England) Paul Casey	69-68-74=211	−5
T10	(Japan) Hideki Matsuyama	71-70-70=211	−5

=== Final round ===
Sunday, April 12, 2015

==== Summary ====
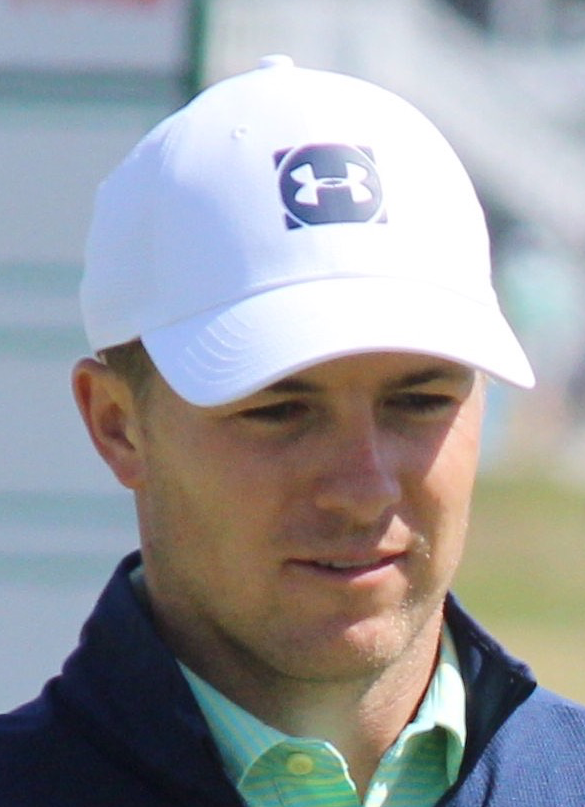
Jordan Spieth won his first Masters title

External videos
- Full final round coverage on CBS on YouTube

Jordan Spieth equaled the tournament scoring record after a round of 70 (−2) gave him a four-stroke victory over Phil Mickelson and Justin Rose and his first major championship. Beginning the round four and five shots behind, respectively, Rose and Mickelson were only able to get within three shots at any point in the round. Spieth's total of 270 tied Tiger Woods in 1997 for lowest score in Masters history, and he became the first wire-to-wire Masters champion since Raymond Floyd in 1976. He got as low as 19-under after a birdie at the 15th, the first in Masters history to do so, before missing an 8-foot par putt at the 18th that would have broken the record. For the week, he recorded 28 birdies, three more than the previous tournament record set by Mickelson in 2001.

==== Final leaderboard ====
Champion
(a) = amateur
(c) = past champion

Top 10
Place	Player	Score	To par	Money (US$)
1	(United States) Jordan Spieth	64-66-70-70=270	−18	1,800,000
T2	(United States) Phil Mickelson (c)	70-68-67-69=274	−14	880,000
T2	(England) Justin Rose	67-70-67-70=274	−14	880,000
4	(Northern Ireland) Rory McIlroy	71-71-68-66=276	−12	480,000
5	(Japan) Hideki Matsuyama	71-70-70-66=277	−11	400,000
T6	(England) Paul Casey	69-68-74-68=279	−9	335,000
T6	(United States) Dustin Johnson	70-67-73-69=279	−9	335,000
T6	(England) Ian Poulter	73-72-67-67=279	−9	335,000
T9	(United States) Charley Hoffman	67-68-71-74=280	−8	270,000
T9	(United States) Zach Johnson (c)	72-72-68-68=280	−8	270,000
T9	(United States) Hunter Mahan	75-70-68-67=280	−8	270,000

Leaderboard below the top 10
Place	Player	Score	To par	Money ($)
T12	(United States) Rickie Fowler	73-72-70-67=282	−6	196,000
T12	(United States) Bill Haas	69-71-72-70=282	−6	196,000
T12	(United States) Ryan Moore	74-66-73-69=282	−6	196,000
T12	(United States) Kevin Na	74-66-70-72=282	−6	196,000
T12	(United States) Kevin Streelman	70-70-70-72=282	−6	196,000
T17	(Spain) Sergio García	68-74-71-70=283	−5	155,000
T17	(United States) Tiger Woods (c)	73-69-68-73=283	−5	155,000
T19	(South Africa) Louis Oosthuizen	72-69-71-72=284	−4	135,000
T19	(Sweden) Henrik Stenson	73-73-70-68=284	−4	135,000
21	(United States) Russell Henley	68-74-72-71=285	−3	120,000
T22	(United States) Keegan Bradley	71-72-75-68=286	−2	92,833
T22	(Argentina) Ángel Cabrera (c)	72-69-73-72=286	−2	92,833
T22	(South Africa) Ernie Els	67-72-75-72=286	−2	92,833
T22	(United States) Mark O'Meara (c)	73-68-77-68=286	−2	92,833
T22	(United States) Patrick Reed	70-72-74-70=286	−2	92,833
T22	(Austria) Bernd Wiesberger	75-70-70-71=286	−2	92,833
T28	(Sweden) Jonas Blixt	72-70-70-75=287	−1	68,000
T28	(Australia) Jason Day	67-74-71-75=287	−1	68,000
T28	(United States) Morgan Hoffmann	73-72-72-70=287	−1	68,000
T28	(United States) Webb Simpson	69-75-72-71=287	−1	68,000
T28	(United States) Steve Stricker	73-73-73-68=287	−1	68,000
T33	(South Korea) Bae Sang-moon	74-71-72-71=288	E	54,000
T33	(Wales) Jamie Donaldson	74-71-76-67=288	E	54,000
T33	(United States) Chris Kirk	72-73-72-71=288	E	54,000
T33	(United States) Brooks Koepka	74-71-71-72=288	E	54,000
T33	(United States) Ryan Palmer	69-74-74-71=288	E	54,000
T38	(South Korea) Noh Seung-yul	70-74-72-73=289	+1	40,000
T38	(South Africa) Charl Schwartzel (c)	71-70-73-75=289	+1	40,000
T38	(Australia) Adam Scott (c)	72-69-74-74=289	+1	40,000
T38	(Australia) John Senden	71-74-72-72=289	+1	40,000
T38	(United States) Cameron Tringale	71-75-69-74=289	+1	40,000
T38	(United States) Jimmy Walker	73-72-74-70=289	+1	40,000
T38	(United States) Bubba Watson (c)	71-71-73-74=289	+1	40,000
T38	(England) Danny Willett	71-71-76-71=289	+1	40,000
T46	(United States) Matt Kuchar	72-74-72-72=290	+2	30,000
T46	(England) Lee Westwood	73-73-70-74=290	+2	30,000
48	(Australia) Geoff Ogilvy	74-70-73-74=291	+3	27,400
T49	(United States) Jason Dufner	74-71-74-73=292	+4	25,600
T49	(India) Anirban Lahiri	71-75-74-72=292	+4	25,600
51	(United States) Erik Compton	73-72-74-74=293	+5	24,600
T52	(Northern Ireland) Darren Clarke	74-71-77-72=294	+6	23,800
T52	(Northern Ireland) Graeme McDowell	71-74-76-73=294	+6	23,800
54	(Fiji) Vijay Singh (c)	75-70-79-71=295	+7	23,200
55	(Thailand) Thongchai Jaidee	75-70-80-72=297	+9	23,000
CUT	(England) Luke Donald	75-72=147	+3	
CUT	(United States) Matt Every	73-74=147	+3	
CUT	(United States) Jim Furyk	74-73=147	+3	
CUT	(Scotland) Stephen Gallacher	71-76=147	+3	
CUT	(United States) James Hahn	73-74=147	+3	
CUT	(United States) J. B. Holmes	76-71=147	+3	
CUT	(Finland) Mikko Ilonen	74-73=147	+3	
CUT	(Germany) Bernhard Langer (c)	73-74=147	+3	
CUT	(Republic of Ireland) Shane Lowry	75-72=147	+3	
CUT	(United States) Brandt Snedeker	74-73=147	+3	
CUT	(United States) Gary Woodland	71-76=147	+3	
CUT	(South Africa) Branden Grace	75-73=148	+4	
CUT	(United States) Brian Harman	76-72=148	+4	
CUT	(United States) Billy Horschel	70-78=148	+4	
CUT	(Netherlands) Joost Luiten	76-72=148	+4	
CUT	(United States) Ben Martin	74-74=148	+4	
CUT	(Colombia) Camilo Villegas	72-76=148	+4	
CUT	(Canada) Corey Conners (a)	80-69=149	+5	
CUT	(France) Victor Dubuisson	74-75=149	+5	
CUT	(Republic of Ireland) Pádraig Harrington	72-77=149	+5	
CUT	(Wales) Ian Woosnam (c)	75-74=149	+5	
CUT	(Scotland) Sandy Lyle (c)	74-76=150	+6	
CUT	(United States) Byron Meth (a)	74-76=150	+6	
CUT	(Spain) José María Olazábal (c)	79-71=150	+6	
CUT	(Denmark) Thomas Bjørn	72-79=151	+7	
CUT	(Spain) Miguel Ángel Jiménez	78-73=151	+7	
CUT	(Germany) Martin Kaymer	76-75=151	+7	
CUT	(United States) Larry Mize (c)	78-73=151	+7	
CUT	(Australia) Antonio Murdaca (a)	78-73=151	+7	
CUT	(United States) Kevin Stadler	77-74=151	+7	
CUT	(United States) Brendon Todd	80-71=151	+7	
CUT	(Chile) Matías Domínguez (a)	76-76=152	+8	
CUT	(United States) Tom Watson (c)	71-81=152	+8	
CUT	(United States) Fred Couples (c)	79-74=153	+9	
CUT	(South Africa) Trevor Immelman (c)	76-77=153	+9	
CUT	(United States) Robert Streb	80-76=156	+12	
CUT	(United States) Ben Crane	79-78=157	+13	
CUT	(United States) Scott Harvey (a)	76-81=157	+13	
CUT	(Scotland) Bradley Neil (a)	78-79=157	+13	
CUT	(South Korea) Gunn Yang (a)	85-74=159	+15	
CUT	(Canada) Mike Weir (c)	82-81=163	+19	
CUT	(United States) Ben Crenshaw (c)	91-85=176	+32	

==== Scorecard ====
Hole	1	2	3	4	5	6	7	8	9	10	11	12	13	14	15	16	17	18
Par	4	5	4	3	4	3	4	5	4	4	4	3	5	4	5	3	4	4
(United States) Spieth	−17	−17	−18	−18	−17	−17	−16	−17	−17	−18	−18	−17	−18	−18	−19	−19	−19	−18
(United States) Mickelson	−11	−12	−12	−12	−11	−11	−11	−12	−11	−12	−12	−12	−13	−12	−14	−14	−14	−14
(England) Rose	−13	−14	−14	−14	−14	−13	−13	−13	−12	−12	−12	−12	−13	−14	−15	−15	−15	−14
(Northern Ireland) McIlroy	−6	−6	−6	−6	−6	−6	−7	−8	−8	−8	−9	−9	−10	−10	−11	−11	−11	−12
(Japan) Matsuyama	−5	−5	−5	−5	−5	−5	−5	−6	−6	−7	−8	−8	−10	−10	−10	−10	−10	−11
(England) Casey	−4	−6	−6	−5	−5	−5	−5	−6	−5	−5	−6	−6	−7	−7	−7	−8	−8	−9
(United States) Johnson	−6	−6	−6	−6	−6	−7	−8	−9	−9	−9	−10	−9	−10	−10	−10	−8	−8	−9
(England) Poulter	−4	−5	−5	−5	−5	−5	−6	−7	−7	−6	−6	−7	−7	−8	−9	−9	−9	−9
