= 2016 Masters Tournament =

American golf tournament held in 2016

Tournament information
- Dates: April 7–10, 2016
- Location: Augusta, Georgia, U.S. 33.503°N 82.020°W
- Course: Augusta National Golf Club
- Tours: PGA Tour; European Tour; Japan Golf Tour

Statistics
- Par: 72
- Length: 7,435 yards (6,799 m)
- Field: 89 players, 57 after cut
- Cut: 150 (+6)
- Prize fund: $10,000,000
- Winner's share: $1,800,000

Champion
- (England) Danny Willett
- 283 (−5)

Location map
- Location in the United States Location in Georgia

The 2016 Masters Tournament was the 80th edition of the Masters Tournament, held April 7–10 at Augusta National Golf Club in Augusta, Georgia. Danny Willett won his first major championship, three strokes ahead of runners-up Lee Westwood and defending champion Jordan Spieth. Spieth suffered one of the biggest collapses in Masters history. Spieth led the tournament from the first round and built a five-shot lead going to the back nine on Sunday, but lost six shots to par over the next three holes culminating in a quadruple-bogey on the 12th hole where he hit two balls into Rae's Creek. Willett shot a bogey-free 67 to overtake Spieth when the leader faltered on the back nine. Willett became the first European to win the Masters since 1999, and the first Englishman to do so since Nick Faldo in 1996.

This was the final Masters appearance for former champion Tom Watson.

== Course ==
The course was formerly a plant nursery and each hole on the course is named after the tree or shrub with which it has become associated.

Hole	Name	Yards	Par	Hole	Name	Yards	Par
1	Tea Olive	445	4	10	Camellia	495	4
2	Pink Dogwood	575	5	11	White Dogwood	505	4
3	Flowering Peach	350	4	12	Golden Bell	155	3
4	Flowering Crab Apple	240	3	13	Azalea	510	5
5	Magnolia	455	4	14	Chinese Fir	440	4
6	Juniper	180	3	15	Firethorn	530	5
7	Pampas	450	4	16	Redbud	170	3
8	Yellow Jasmine	570	5	17	Nandina	440	4
9	Carolina Cherry	460	4	18	Holly	465	4
Out		3,725	36	In		3,710	36
Source:				Total		7,435	72

== Field ==
The Masters has the smallest field of the four major championships. Officially, the Masters remains an invitation event, but there is a set of qualifying criteria that determines who is included in the field. Each player is classified according to the first category by which he qualified, with other categories in which he qualified shown in parentheses.

Golfers who qualify based solely on their performance in amateur tournaments (categories 6–10) must remain amateurs on the starting day of the tournament to be eligible to play.

1. Past Masters Champions

- Ángel Cabrera
- Trevor Immelman
- Zach Johnson (3,11,13,16,17,18)
- Bernhard Langer
- Sandy Lyle
- Phil Mickelson (3,11,17,18)
- Larry Mize
- Mark O'Meara
- Charl Schwartzel (15,17,18)
- Adam Scott (12,15,17,18)
- Vijay Singh
- Jordan Spieth (2,11,12,13,14,15,16,17,18)
- Bubba Watson (15,16,17,18)
- Tom Watson
- Mike Weir
- Ian Woosnam
- Fred Couples, José María Olazábal, and Tiger Woods (5) did not play due to injuries.
- The following past champions did not enter: Tommy Aaron, Jack Burke Jr., Charles Coody, Ben Crenshaw, Nick Faldo, Raymond Floyd, Doug Ford, Bob Goalby, Jack Nicklaus, Arnold Palmer, Gary Player, Craig Stadler, Fuzzy Zoeller. Nicklaus, Palmer, and Player served as "honorary starters", though only Nicklaus and Player teed off on the first day at the first hole to kick off the tournament.

2. Last five U.S. Open Champions

- Martin Kaymer (5,17,18)
- Rory McIlroy (3,4,11,15,16,17,18)
- Justin Rose (11,14,15,16,17,18)
- Webb Simpson

3. Last five British Open Champions

- Darren Clarke
- Ernie Els

4. Last five PGA Champions

- Keegan Bradley
- Jason Day (13,14,15,16,17,18)
- Jason Dufner (15)

5. Last three winners of The Players Championship

- Rickie Fowler (11,15,16,17,18)

6. Top two finishers in the 2015 U.S. Amateur

- Derek Bard (a)
- Bryson DeChambeau (a)

7. Winner of the 2015 Amateur Championship

- Romain Langasque (a)

8. Winner of the 2015 Asia-Pacific Amateur Championship

- Jin Cheng (a)

9. Winner of the 2016 Latin America Amateur Championship

- Paul Chaplet (a)

10. Winner of the 2015 U.S. Mid-Amateur

- Sammy Schmitz (a)

11. The top 12 finishers and ties in the 2015 Masters Tournament

- Paul Casey (16,17,18)
- Bill Haas (16,17,18)
- Charley Hoffman (16)
- Dustin Johnson (12,16,17,18)
- Hunter Mahan
- Hideki Matsuyama (15,16,17,18)
- Ryan Moore (18)
- Kevin Na (16,17,18)
- Ian Poulter
- Kevin Streelman

12. Top 4 finishers and ties in the 2015 U.S. Open

- Branden Grace (14,17,18)
- Louis Oosthuizen (13,16,17,18)
- Cameron Smith

13. Top 4 finishers and ties in the 2015 British Open Championship

- Marc Leishman (17,18)

14. Top 4 finishers and ties in the 2015 PGA Championship

15. Winners of PGA Tour events that award a full-point allocation for the FedEx Cup, between the 2015 Masters Tournament and the 2016 Masters Tournament

- Steven Bowditch (16)
- Fabián Gómez
- Emiliano Grillo (17,18)
- Jim Herman
- Smylie Kaufman
- Chris Kirk
- Kevin Kisner (16,17,18)
- Russell Knox (17,18)
- Danny Lee (16,17,18)
- David Lingmerth (18)
- Davis Love III
- Shane Lowry (17,18)
- Graeme McDowell
- Troy Merritt
- Brandt Snedeker (16,17,18)
- Vaughn Taylor
- Justin Thomas (17,18)
- Jim Furyk (16,17,18) was unable to compete due to wrist surgery.

16. All players qualifying for the 2015 edition of The Tour Championship

- Daniel Berger
- Harris English
- J. B. Holmes (17,18)
- Brooks Koepka (17,18)
- Matt Kuchar (17,18)
- Scott Piercy (17,18)
- Patrick Reed (17,18)
- Henrik Stenson (17,18)
- Robert Streb (17)
- Jimmy Walker (17,18)
- Bae Sang-moon was unable to compete due to a military obligation in South Korea.

17. Top 50 on the final 2015 Official World Golf Ranking list

- An Byeong-hun (18)
- Kiradech Aphibarnrat (18)
- Jamie Donaldson
- Victor Dubuisson (18)
- Matt Fitzpatrick (18)
- Sergio García (18)
- Billy Horschel (18)
- Thongchai Jaidee (18)
- Søren Kjeldsen (18)
- Anirban Lahiri (18)
- Andy Sullivan (18)
- Lee Westwood
- Bernd Wiesberger (18)
- Danny Willett (18)
- Chris Wood (18)

18. Top 50 on the Official World Golf Ranking list on March 28, 2016

- Rafa Cabrera-Bello

19. International invitees

- None

Appearing in their first Masters were Kiradech Aphibarnrat, Daniel Berger, Rafa Cabrera-Bello, Fabián Gómez, Emiliano Grillo, Jim Herman, Smylie Kaufman, Kevin Kisner, Russell Knox, David Lingmerth, Troy Merritt, Cameron Smith, Andy Sullivan, Justin Thomas, and all six amateurs. Four of the amateurs (Bard, Chaplet, Cheng and Schmitz) were appearing in their first major. In addition, An Byeong-hun, Matt Fitzpatrick, and Danny Lee appeared in their first Masters as professionals. Tom Watson was playing in his final Masters event.

== Par 3 contest ==
Wednesday, April 6, 2016

Jimmy Walker won the par 3 contest with a score of 19 (−8), a new tournament record. Nine holes-in-one were made, surpassing the previous record of five set in 2002 and 2015. The players to record an ace were: Rickie Fowler, Zach Johnson, Smylie Kaufman, David Lingmerth, Gary Player, Webb Simpson, Andy Sullivan, Justin Thomas, and Walker.

== Round summaries ==
=== First round ===
Thursday, April 7, 2016

Defending champion Jordan Spieth shot a 6-under-par 66 to take a two-shot lead over Danny Lee and Shane Lowry. His bogey-free round was his ninth consecutive Masters round of par or better. World number one Jason Day was 5-under-par through the front nine but shot 5-over-par on the back nine, including a triple-bogey on the 16th hole, to end at even-par. Ernie Els scored a record-worst nine on the first hole after taking six putts from within three feet and ended his round at 8-over-par. The course played difficult due to windy conditions and the scoring average for the field was 74.16.

Place	Player	Score	To par
1	(United States) Jordan Spieth	66	−6
T2	(New Zealand) Danny Lee	68	−4
T2	(Republic of Ireland) Shane Lowry	68	−4
T4	(England) Paul Casey	69	−3
T4	(Spain) Sergio García	69	−3
T4	(Denmark) Søren Kjeldsen	69	−3
T4	(England) Ian Poulter	69	−3
T4	(England) Justin Rose	69	−3
T9	(United States) Billy Horschel	70	−2
T9	(Northern Ireland) Rory McIlroy	70	−2
T9	(United States) Scott Piercy	70	−2
T9	(England) Danny Willett	70	−2

=== Second round ===
Friday, April 8, 2016

Jordan Spieth led by as many as five shots but then carded four bogeys and a double bogey and needed a 14-foot par save at the 18th to preserve a one-shot advantage over Rory McIlroy. This was Spieth's sixth consecutive round with the lead at the Masters, tying the record set by Arnold Palmer in 1960–61. Amateur Bryson DeChambeau got to within a shot of the lead but suffered a triple bogey at the last to finish at even-par. Gusting winds led to difficult scoring conditions, with only four players (Daniel Berger, Dustin Johnson, McIlroy, and Troy Merritt) shooting under par, each shooting 71. The scoring average for the round was 75.02, the highest since 2007 and only seven golfers were under par after two rounds. Tom Watson missed the cut in his 43rd and final Masters.

Place	Player	Score	To par
1	(United States) Jordan Spieth	66-74=140	−4
2	(Northern Ireland) Rory McIlroy	70-71=141	−3
T3	(United States) Scott Piercy	70-72=142	−2
T3	(New Zealand) Danny Lee	68-74=142	−2
T5	(Denmark) Søren Kjeldsen	69-74=143	−1
T5	(Japan) Hideki Matsuyama	71-72=143	−1
T5	(United States) Brandt Snedeker	71-72=143	−1
T8	(Thailand) Kiradech Aphibarnrat	72-72=144	E
T8	(United States) Daniel Berger	73-71=144	E
T8	(United States) Bryson DeChambeau (a)	72-72=144	E
T8	(Spain) Sergio García	69-75=144	E
T8	(United States) Dustin Johnson	73-71=144	E
T8	(Republic of Ireland) Shane Lowry	68-76=144	E
T8	(England) Danny Willett	70-74=144	E

Amateurs: DeChambeau (E), Langasque (+3), Bard (+9), Schmitz (+12), Cheng (+13), Chaplet (+21)

=== Third round ===
Saturday, April 9, 2016

Jordan Spieth held the lead at the Masters for the seventh consecutive round, a new tournament record, and the third straight year after 54 holes. After a double bogey at the 11th, Spieth rebounded with birdies on three of his next four holes to take a four-shot lead, but then bogeyed the 17th and carded another double bogey on the 18th to post 73 (+1) and drop the lead to one. Smylie Kaufman recorded the lowest score of the round with 69 (−3) and moved into second place. Two-time champion Bernhard Langer, at age 58 attempting to become the oldest major champion, shot a round of 70 and tied Hideki Matsuyama for third, two shots back of Spieth. Rory McIlroy entered the round a shot out of the lead but failed to make a birdie and carded 77 (+5).

Place	Player	Score	To par
1	(United States) Jordan Spieth	66-74-73=213	−3
2	(United States) Smylie Kaufman	73-72-69=214	−2
T3	(Germany) Bernhard Langer	72-73-70=215	−1
T3	(Japan) Hideki Matsuyama	71-72-72=215	−1
T5	(Australia) Jason Day	72-73-71=216	E
T5	(United States) Dustin Johnson	73-71-72=216	E
T5	(England) Danny Willett	70-74-72=216	E
T8	(Denmark) Søren Kjeldsen	69-74-74=217	+1
T8	(United States) Brandt Snedeker	71-72-74=217	+1
T8	(England) Lee Westwood	71-75-71=217	+1

=== Final round ===
Sunday, April 10, 2016

==== Summary ====
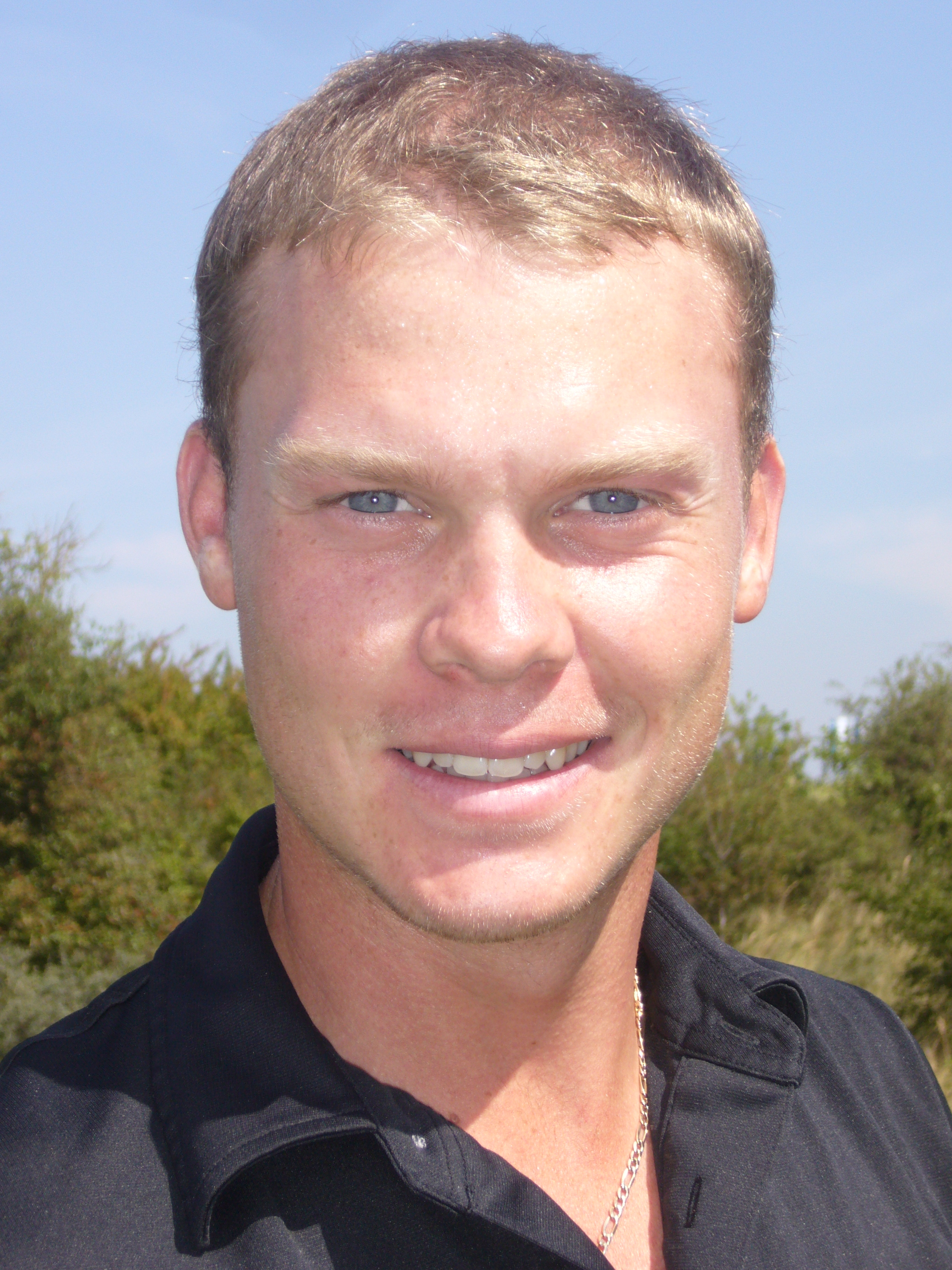
Danny Willett won his first Masters title

External videos
- Full final round coverage on CBS on YouTube

Danny Willett came back from five shots down at the start of the back nine to win his first major title. Jordan Spieth birdied his final four holes of the front-nine to open up a five-shot advantage. After bogeys at the 10th and 11th, Spieth put two balls in the water on the par-3 12th and made quadruple bogey, dropping him to a tie for fourth. Willett, meanwhile, made birdie at 13 and 14 to take the lead. Lee Westwood chipped in for eagle at the 15th to get within one of Willett, but then made bogey on 16 while Willett made birdie. Willett made par on the last two holes to post a round of 67 and five-under for the tournament.

After rebounding with birdies on 13 and 15, Spieth needed to birdie two of his last three holes to tie but missed an 8-foot (2.4 m) birdie at 16 then bogeyed 17 to fall out of contention. Spieth's downfall in the final round capped one of the biggest collapses in Masters history, with many comparing it to the meltdown of Greg Norman at the 1996 Masters. (Note: See.) Dustin Johnson also made birdie on 13 and 15 to get within two of Willett, but made double bogey on the 17th. Smylie Kaufman began the round a shot out of the lead but shot 81 (+9) and finished in 29th. For the first time in Masters history, three players (Shane Lowry, Davis Love III, and Louis Oosthuizen) made a hole-in-one on the par-3 16th.

==== Final leaderboard ====
Champion
Silver Cup winner (low amateur)
(a) = amateur
(c) = past champion

Top 10
Place	Player	Score	To par	Money (US$)
1	(England) Danny Willett	70-74-72-67=283	−5	1,800,000
T2	(United States) Jordan Spieth (c)	66-74-73-73=286	−2	880,000
T2	(England) Lee Westwood	71-75-71-69=286	−2	880,000
T4	(England) Paul Casey	69-77-74-67=287	−1	413,333
T4	(United States) J. B. Holmes	72-73-74-68=287	−1	413,333
T4	(United States) Dustin Johnson	73-71-72-71=287	−1	413,333
T7	(England) Matt Fitzpatrick	71-76-74-67=288	E	311,667
T7	(Denmark) Søren Kjeldsen	69-74-74-71=288	E	311,667
T7	(Japan) Hideki Matsuyama	71-72-72-73=288	E	311,667
T10	(United States) Daniel Berger	73-71-74-71=289	+1	230,000
T10	(Australia) Jason Day	72-73-71-73=289	+1	230,000
T10	(Northern Ireland) Rory McIlroy	70-71-77-71=289	+1	230,000
T10	(England) Justin Rose	69-77-73-70=289	+1	230,000
T10	(United States) Brandt Snedeker	71-72-74-72=289	+1	230,000

Leaderboard below the top 10
Place	Player	Score	To par	Money ($)
T15	(Thailand) Kiradech Aphibarnrat	72-72-77-70=291	+3	175,000
T15	(South Africa) Louis Oosthuizen	72-77-71-71=291	+3	175,000
T17	(Spain) Rafa Cabrera-Bello	74-73-75-70=292	+4	145,000
T17	(Argentina) Emiliano Grillo	71-75-74-72=292	+4	145,000
T17	(United States) Billy Horschel	70-77-73-72=292	+4	145,000
T17	(New Zealand) Danny Lee	68-74-79-71=292	+4	145,000
T21	(United States) Bryson DeChambeau (a)	72-72-77-72=293	+5	0
T21	(Wales) Jamie Donaldson	74-72-75-72=293	+5	116,000
T21	(United States) Brooks Koepka	73-72-76-72=293	+5	116,000
T24	(Argentina) Ángel Cabrera (c)	73-73-73-75=294	+6	89,000
T24	(United States) Bill Haas	75-74-72-73=294	+6	89,000
T24	(United States) Matt Kuchar	75-73-72-74=294	+6	89,000
T24	(Germany) Bernhard Langer (c)	72-73-70-79=294	+6	89,000
T24	(Sweden) Henrik Stenson	72-75-78-69=294	+6	89,000
T29	(United States) Charley Hoffman	71-77-73-74=295	+7	68,000
T29	(United States) Smylie Kaufman	73-72-69-81=295	+7	68,000
T29	(United States) Scott Piercy	70-72-79-74=295	+7	68,000
T29	(United States) Webb Simpson	77-72-74-72=295	+7	68,000
T29	(United States) Jimmy Walker	71-75-74-75=295	+7	68,000
T34	(Spain) Sergio García	69-75-81-71=296	+8	56,500
T34	(United States) Kevin Streelman	71-75-79-71=296	+8	56,500
T34	(Austria) Bernd Wiesberger	73-72-79-72=296	+8	56,500
T37	(United States) Kevin Kisner	77-72-76-72=297	+9	50,250
T37	(United States) Bubba Watson (c)	75-75-76-71=297	+9	50,250
T39	(France) Romain Langasque (a)	74-73-83-68=298	+10	0
T39	(Republic of Ireland) Shane Lowry	68-76-79-75=298	+10	46,000
T39	(United States) Justin Thomas	76-73-78-71=298	+10	46,000
T42	(France) Victor Dubuisson	73-76-76-74=299	+11	37,000
T42	(United States) Harris English	74-73-76-76=299	+11	37,000
T42	(India) Anirban Lahiri	76-73-75-75=299	+11	37,000
T42	(United States) Davis Love III	73-73-76-77=299	+11	37,000
T42	(United States) Troy Merritt	74-71-79-75=299	+11	37,000
T42	(Australia) Adam Scott (c)	76-72-75-76=299	+11	37,000
T42	(England) Chris Wood	72-73-75-79=299	+11	37,000
T49	(Germany) Martin Kaymer	74-75-79-72=300	+12	27,467
T49	(England) Ian Poulter	69-78-82-71=300	+12	27,467
T49	(United States) Patrick Reed	76-73-75-76=300	+12	27,467
T52	(United States) Keegan Bradley	74-73-77-77=301	+13	24,900
T52	(United States) Larry Mize (c)	76-73-78-74=301	+13	24,900
54	(United States) Hunter Mahan	73-75-78-76=302	+14	24,000
T55	(United States) Kevin Na	72-74-85-72=303	+15	23,400
T55	(Australia) Cameron Smith	74-73-82-74=303	+15	23,400
57	(Thailand) Thongchai Jaidee	72-76-81-78=307	+19	23,000
CUT	(South Korea) An Byeong-hun	77-74=151	+7	
CUT	(South Africa) Trevor Immelman (c)	77-74=151	+7	
CUT	(Australia) Marc Leishman	74-77=151	+7	
CUT	(United States) Phil Mickelson (c)	72-79=151	+7	
CUT	(United States) Vaughn Taylor	74-77=151	+7	
CUT	(South Africa) Branden Grace	75-77=152	+8	
CUT	(United States) Zach Johnson (c)	72-80=152	+8	
CUT	(Scotland) Russell Knox	79-73=152	+8	
CUT	(Sweden) David Lingmerth	79-73=152	+8	
CUT	(South Africa) Charl Schwartzel (c)	76-76=152	+8	
CUT	(United States) Tom Watson (c)	74-78=152	+8	
CUT	(United States) Derek Bard (a)	76-77=153	+9	
CUT	(United States) Jason Dufner	76-77=153	+9	
CUT	(South Africa) Ernie Els	80-73=153	+9	
CUT	(United States) Rickie Fowler	80-73=153	+9	
CUT	(United States) Jim Herman	75-78=153	+9	
CUT	(United States) Chris Kirk	76-77=153	+9	
CUT	(Northern Ireland) Graeme McDowell	72-81=153	+9	
CUT	(Fiji) Vijay Singh (c)	80-73=153	+9	
CUT	(Canada) Mike Weir (c)	76-78=154	+10	
CUT	(United States) Ryan Moore	80-75=155	+11	
CUT	(United States) Sammy Schmitz (a)	81-75=156	+12	
CUT	(United States) Robert Streb	81-75=156	+12	
CUT	(China) Jin Cheng (a)	79-78=157	+13	
CUT	(Argentina) Fabián Gómez	77-80=157	+13	
CUT	(Scotland) Sandy Lyle (c)	76-81=157	+13	
CUT	(United States) Mark O'Meara (c)	77-80=157	+13	
CUT	(England) Andy Sullivan	80-77=157	+13	
CUT	(Northern Ireland) Darren Clarke	76-84=160	+16	
CUT	(Australia) Steven Bowditch	79-82=161	+17	
CUT	(Wales) Ian Woosnam (c)	82-81=163	+19	
CUT	(Costa Rica) Paul Chaplet (a)	83-82=165	+21	

==== Scorecard ====
Hole	1	2	3	4	5	6	7	8	9	10	11	12	13	14	15	16	17	18
Par	4	5	4	3	4	3	4	5	4	4	4	3	5	4	5	3	4	4
(England) Willett	E	E	E	E	E	−1	−1	−2	−2	−2	−2	−2	−3	−4	−4	−5	−5	−5
(United States) Spieth	−3	−4	−4	−4	−3	−4	−5	−6	−7	−6	−5	−1	−2	−2	−3	−3	−2	−2
(England) Westwood	+2	+2	+2	+2	+2	+1	E	E	−1	E	E	E	−1	−1	−3	−2	−2	−2
(England) Casey	+4	+3	+3	+3	+3	+3	+2	+2	+2	+2	+2	+2	+1	+1	E	E	E	−1
(United States) Holmes	+2	+3	+4	+5	+4	+4	+4	+3	+3	+3	+3	+2	+1	+1	+1	E	E	−1
(United States) Johnson	E	E	E	E	+2	+1	+1	E	−1	−1	−1	−1	−2	−2	−3	−3	−1	−1
(Japan) Matsuyama	E	−1	−1	E	+1	+3	+3	+2	+2	+1	+1	+1	E	E	E	E	E	E
(Australia) Day	E	E	E	E	+1	+1	+1	E	E	+1	+1	+1	+1	+1	E	E	E	+1
(Germany) Langer	E	E	+2	+2	+3	+3	+3	+3	+3	+4	+4	+4	+4	+4	+4	+4	+5	+6
(United States) Kaufman	−2	−3	−2	−1	−1	−1	E	E	+1	+2	+3	+2	+3	+3	+3	+5	+6	+7

Cumulative tournament scores, relative to par

Eagle	Birdie	Bogey	Double bogey	Triple bogey+
