= Matías Domínguez =

Chilean golfer

- Domínguez at the 2015 Masters Tournament

Personal information
- Full name: Matías Domínguez Balbontín
- Nationality: Chile
- Born: 9 September 1992 (age 34) Santiago, Chile
- Height: 5 ft 6 in (1.68 m)

Career
- Sport: Golf
- College: Texas Tech University
- Turned professional: 2021
- Current tours: Professional Golf Tour of India; Chilean Tour
- Professional wins: 2

Best results in major championships
- Masters Tournament: CUT: 2015
- PGA Championship: DNP
- U.S. Open: DNP
- The Open Championship: DNP

Matías Domínguez Balbontín (born 9 September 1992) is a Chilean professional golfer.

== Amateur career ==
In 2015, Domínguez won the inaugural Latin America Amateur Championship in Pilar, Argentina, earning an invitation to the 2015 Masters Tournament. He played college golf at Texas Tech University.

== Professional career ==
In February 2024, Domínguez shot a round of 59 in the final round of the Professional Golf Tour of India qualifying school to win the event and earn a card for the 2024 season.

== Amateur wins ==
- 2011 Match Play Chile Championship, Golf Chilean Federation Championship
- 2014 Cachagua Open
- 2015 Latin America Amateur Championship, Campeonato Abierto de Aficionados Prince of Wales C.C.

== Professional wins (2) ==
=== Chilean Tour wins (1) ===
No.	Date	Tournament	Winning score	Margin of victory	Runners-up
1	7 Jan 2024	Abierto de Cachagua	−15 (65-66-70=201)	2 strokes	(Chile) Felipe Aguilar, (Chile) Agustín Errázuriz, (Chile) Gustavo Silva

=== FG Sports Tour wins (1) ===
No.	Date	Tournament	Winning score	Margin of victory	Runner-up
1	21 May 2023	13° Fecha	−8 (71-68-69=208)	3 strokes	(Chile) Felipe Aguilar

== Results in major championships ==
Tournament	2015
Masters Tournament	CUT
U.S. Open	
The Open Championship	
PGA Championship	

Did not play

CUT = missed the half-way cut

== Team appearances ==
- Eisenhower Trophy (representing Chile): 2010, 2014

== See also ==
- Lowest rounds of golf
