= Derek Bard =

American professional golfer (born 1995)

Personal information
- Nationality: United States
- Born: June 14, 1995 (age 31) New Hartford, New York, U.S.

Career
- Sport: Golf
- College: University of Virginia
- Turned professional: 2017

Best results in major championships
- Masters Tournament: CUT: 2016
- PGA Championship: DNP
- U.S. Open: CUT: 2016
- The Open Championship: DNP

Derek Bard (born June 14, 1995) is an American professional golfer.

== Early life ==
Bard was born in New Hartford, New York and played college golf at the University of Virginia. He currently resides in Jacksonville Beach, Florida.

== Career ==
Bard finished runner-up to Bryson DeChambeau at the 2015 U.S. Amateur, thus earning an invitation to the 2016 Masters Tournament and the 2016 U.S. Open.

Bard missed the cut at the Masters by three shots, shooting rounds of 76-77, 9-over-par.

== Personal life ==
Bard was born to David and Dawn Bard. He has a brother, Alec, and a sister Sydney. Sydney is a professional ice hockey player.

== Amateur wins (5) ==
- 2014 U.S. Collegiate
- 2015 Sunnehanna Amateur, U.S. Collegiate
- 2017 Cleveland Golf Palmetto Invite, Monroe Invitational

== Results in major championships ==
Tournament	2016
Masters Tournament	CUT
U.S. Open	CUT
The Open Championship	
PGA Championship	

Did not play

CUT = missed the half-way cut

== U.S. national team appearances ==
- Arnold Palmer Cup: 2016
