= Toto Gana =

Chilean professional golfer

Personal information
- Full name: Tomás Gana
- Nickname: Toto
- Nationality: Chile
- Born: 17 April 1997 (age 29) Santiago, Chile

Career
- Sport: Golf
- College: Lynn University
- Turned professional: 2021
- Current tours: Sunshine Tour; Chilean Tour
- Professional wins: 5

Best results in major championships
- Masters Tournament: CUT: 2017
- PGA Championship: DNP
- U.S. Open: DNP
- The Open Championship: DNP
Medal record
South American Games
Silver medal – second place	2026 Santa Fe	Individual

Tomás "Toto" Gana (born 17 April 1997) is a Chilean professional golfer.

Gana was born in Santiago de Chile. He won the 2017 Latin America Amateur Championship, thereby earning an invitation to the 2017 Masters Tournament, where he finished in last place among the 93 starters. He represented Chile at the 2015 Toyota Junior Golf World Cup. He played college golf for the Lynn Fighting Knights in Boca Raton, Florida, United States.

== Professional career ==
Gana turned professional in 2021. In April 2025, he qualified to play on the Sunshine Tour for the 2025–26 season by finishing T16 at the qualifying school.

== Amateur wins ==
- 2017 Latin America Amateur Championship, Torneo Aficionado Copa Fortox Bucaramanga
- 2018 NCAA DII Preview

== Professional wins (5) ==
=== Chilean Tour wins (4) ===
No.	Date	Tournament	Winning score	Margin of victory	Runner(s)-up
1	10 Feb 2024	Abierto La Serena	−10 (67-70-69=206)	1 stroke	(Chile) Christian Espinoza
2	29 Sep 2024	Abierto Las Brisas De Chicureo	−11 (70-68-67=205)	4 strokes	(Chile) Christian Espinoza
3	27 Oct 2024	Abierto Club La Dehesa	−10 (67-70-69=206)	2 strokes	(Chile) Agustín Errázuriz
4	8 Feb 2025	Abierto Brisas de Santo Domingo	−14 (71-62-69=202)	5 strokes	(Chile) Philippe Guidi, (Chile) Benjamín Saiz-Wenz

=== FG Sports Tour wins (1) ===
No.	Date	Tournament	Winning score	Margin of victory	Runner-up
1	21 Apr 2024	19° Fecha	−13 (67-69-67=203)	3 strokes	(Chile) Benjamín Saiz-Wenz

== Results in major championships ==
Tournament	2017
Masters Tournament	CUT
U.S. Open	
The Open Championship	
PGA Championship	

Did not play

CUT = missed the half-way cut

== Team appearances ==
- Eisenhower Trophy (representing Chile): 2018
