= Golf at the 2026 South American Games =

Golf competitions at the 2026 South American Games

- Venue: Rosario Golf Club
- Dates: 15–18 September
- Competitors: 36 from 10 nations

Golf competitions at the 2026 South American Games in Rosario, Santa Fe, and Rafaela, Argentina, were held between 15 and 18 September at Rosario Golf Club in Rosario.

A total of three events were contested (one men's, one women's and one mixed).

== Medal summary ==
=== Medal table ===
* Host nation (Argentina)

Rank	Nation	Gold	Silver	Bronze	Total
1	Paraguay	2	0	0	2
2	Colombia	1	2	0	3
3	Chile	0	1	0	1
4	Argentina*	0	0	2	2
5	Venezuela	0	0	1	1
Totals (5 entries)		3	3	3	9

=== Medalists ===
Event	Gold	Silver	Bronze
Men's individual	Felipe Álvarez; Colombia	Tomás Gana; Chile	Manuel Torres; Venezuela
Women's individual	Sofia García; Paraguay	María Bohórquez; Colombia	Ana Giuliano; Argentina
Mixed team	Paraguay; Silvero Gustavo; Marcelo Ruiz; Milagros Chaves; Sofia García	Colombia; Felipe Álvarez; Nicolás Quintero; María Bohórquez; Luciana Medina	Argentina; Miguel Ángel Carballo; Agustin Oliva-Pinto; Ana Giuliano; Mia Yaya

== Participation ==
Ten nations participated in the golf events of the 2026 South American Games.

- Argentina (4)
- Bolivia (3)
- Brazil (2)
- Chile (3)
- Colombia (4)
- Panama (4)
- Paraguay (4)
- Peru (4)
- Uruguay (4)
- Venezuela (4)

== Results ==
=== Men's individual ===
Rank	Name	Nation	Round 1	Round 2	Round 3	Round 4	Total
1st place, gold medalist(s)	Felipe Álvarez	Colombia	71	68	70	71	280 (−4)
2nd place, silver medalist(s)	Tomás Gana	Chile	70	72	70	71	283 (−1)
3rd place, bronze medalist(s)	Manuel Torres	Venezuela	76	69	68	72	285 (+1)
4	Nicolás Quintero	Colombia	71	73	70	72	286 (+2)
5	Agustín Oliva-Pinto	Argentina	71	69	75	72	287 (+3)
=6	Gabriel Morgan	Chile	71	71	73	73	288 (+4)
=6	Gustavo Silvero	Paraguay	73	74	68	73	288 (+4)
8	Miguel Ángel Carballo	Argentina	68	74	73	74	289 (+5)
9	Juan Álvarez	Uruguay	73	78	72	68	291 (+7)
10	Juan Esmoris	Uruguay	73	75	75	72	295 (+11)
=11	Andrey Xavier	Brazil	75	76	75	71	297 (+13)
=11	Marcelo Ruiz	Paraguay	74	73	72	78	297 (+13)
13	Wolmer Murillo	Venezuela	76	78	75	69	298 (+14)
14	J. Paul Ducret	Panama	77	77	77	70	301 (+17)
15	Santiago Zubiate	Peru	72	79	75	76	302 (+18)
=16	Patricio Freundt-Thurne	Peru	80	80	73	72	305 (+21)
=16	Flavio Sameja	Bolivia	79	75	76	75	305 (+21)
18	J. Louis Ducret	Panama	80	78	77	75	310 (+26)

=== Women's individual ===
Rank	Name	Nation	Round 1	Round 2	Round 3	Round 4	Total
1st place, gold medalist(s)	Sofía García	Paraguay	72	70	66	67	275 (−13)
2nd place, silver medalist(s)	María José Bohorquez	Colombia	73	71	71	75	290 (+2)
3rd place, bronze medalist(s)	Ana Giuliano	Argentina	66	70	80	76	292 (+4)
4	Milagros Chaves	Paraguay	78	72	75	73	298 (+10)
5	Aitana Tuesta	Peru	77	78	76	71	302 (+14)
6	María Tablante	Venezuela	75	77	75	76	303 (+15)
7	Vanessa Gilly	Venezuela	75	71	79	80	305 (+17)
8	Michelle Melandri	Chile	81	76	74	80	311 (+23)
=9	Jimena Márques	Uruguay	75	77	83	77	312 (+24)
=9	Zoe Pinillos	Peru	73	81	80	78	312 (+24)
11	Lauren Grinberg	Brazil	75	80	81	77	313 (+25)
12	Luciana Medina	Colombia	76	83	80	76	315 (+27)
13	Mia Yaya	Argentina	80	76	82	83	321 (+33)
14	Carolina Mailhos	Uruguay	78	86	82	77	323 (+35)
15	Alexa Rodríguez	Panama	77	88	88	74	327 (+39)
16	Carolina Paz	Bolivia	88	77	86	79	330 (+42)
=17	Mayumi Onishi	Bolivia	85	85	83	78	331 (+43)
=17	Ailynn Nakada	Panama	87	81	84	79	331 (+43)

=== Mixed team ===
Rank	Name	Nation	Round 1	Round 2	Round 3	Round 4	Total
1st place, gold medalist(s)	Marcelo Ruiz; Gustavo Silvero; Sofía García; Milagros Chaves	Paraguay	145	143	134	140	562 (−10)
2nd place, silver medalist(s)	Nicolás Quintero; Felipe Álvarez; María José Bohorquez; Luciana Medina	Colombia	144	139	141	146	570 (−2)
3rd place, bronze medalist(s)	Agustín Oliva-Pinto; Miguel Ángel Carballo; Mia Yaya; Ana Giuliano	Argentina	134	139	153	148	574 (+2)
4	Vanessa Gilly; María Tablante; Manuel Torres; Wolmer Murillo	Venezuela	151	140	143	145	579 (+7)
5	Tomás Gana; Michelle Melandri; Gabriel Morgan	Chile	151	147	144	151	593 (+21)
6	Santiago Zubiate; Aitana Tuesta; Zoe Pinillos; Patricio Freundt-Thurne	Peru	145	157	149	143	594 (+22)
7	Juan Álvarez; Carolina Mailhos; Jimena Marques; Juan Esmoris	Uruguay	148	152	154	145	599 (+27)
8	Andrey Xavier; Lauren Grinberg	Brazil	150	156	156	148	610 (+38)
9	J. Louis Ducret; Alexa Rodríguez; Ailynn Nakada; J. Paul Ducret	Panama	154	158	161	144	617 (+45)
10	Flavio Sameja; Mayumi Onishi; Carolina Paz	Bolivia	164	152	159	153	628 (+56)
