= Golf at the 2023 Central American and Caribbean Games =

- Venue: El Encanto Country Club
- Location: San José Villanueva, El Salvador
- Dates: 4–7 July

The golf competition at the 2023 Central American and Caribbean Games will be held in San José Villanueva, El Salvador from 4 July to 7 July at the El Encanto Country Club.

== Medal table ==
* Host nation (El Salvador)

Rank	Nation	Gold	Silver	Bronze	Total
1	Colombia (COL)	1	0	1	2
2	Costa Rica (CRC)	1	0	0	1
3	Mexico (MEX)	0	1	1	2
4	Puerto Rico (PUR)	0	1	0	1
Totals (4 entries)		2	2	2	6

== Medal summary ==
Event	Gold	Silver	Bronze
Men	Paul Chaplet (CRC)	José de Jesús Rodríguez (MEX)	Ricardo Celia (COL)
Women	María José Marín (COL)	Maria Torres (PUR)	Maria Lira (MEX)
