= Paul Chaplet =

Costa Rican professional golfer

Personal information
- Nationality: Costa Rica
- Born: 18 April 1999 (age 27) San José, Costa Rica
- Height: 5 ft 11 in (1.80 m)

Career
- Sport: Golf
- College: Arizona State University; Sam Houston State University
- Turned professional: 2021
- Current tour: PGA Tour Americas
- Former tour: PGA Tour Latinoamérica

Best results in major championships
- Masters Tournament: CUT: 2016
- PGA Championship: DNP
- U.S. Open: DNP
- The Open Championship: DNP
Medal record
Central American and Caribbean Games
Gold medal – first place	2023 San Salvador	Individual

Paul Chaplet (born 18 April 1999) is a Costa Rican professional golfer who is best known for winning the 2016 Latin America Amateur Championship, also gaining a spot in the 2016 Masters Tournament, becoming the first Costa Rican player to do so.

== Amateur career ==
In January 2016, Chaplet won the Latin America Amateur Championship in the Dominican Republic, beating Venezuelan Jorge García by one shot. The win also gained him a spot in the 2016 Masters Tournament.

Chaplet initially played college golf at Arizona State University from 2017 to 2020. He then played college golf at Sam Houston State University in 2020 and 2021, where he was named 2021 Southland Conference Co-Golfer of the year.

== Amateur wins ==
- 2014 Costa Rica National Junior
- 2015 Costa Rica National Junior
- 2016 Latin America Amateur Championship
- 2017 Cameonato Sudamericano Amateur, Central American Championship

== Team appearances ==
Amateur

- Eisenhower Trophy (representing Costa Rica): 2016, 2018, 2022
