= Antonio Murdaca =

Australian professional golfer

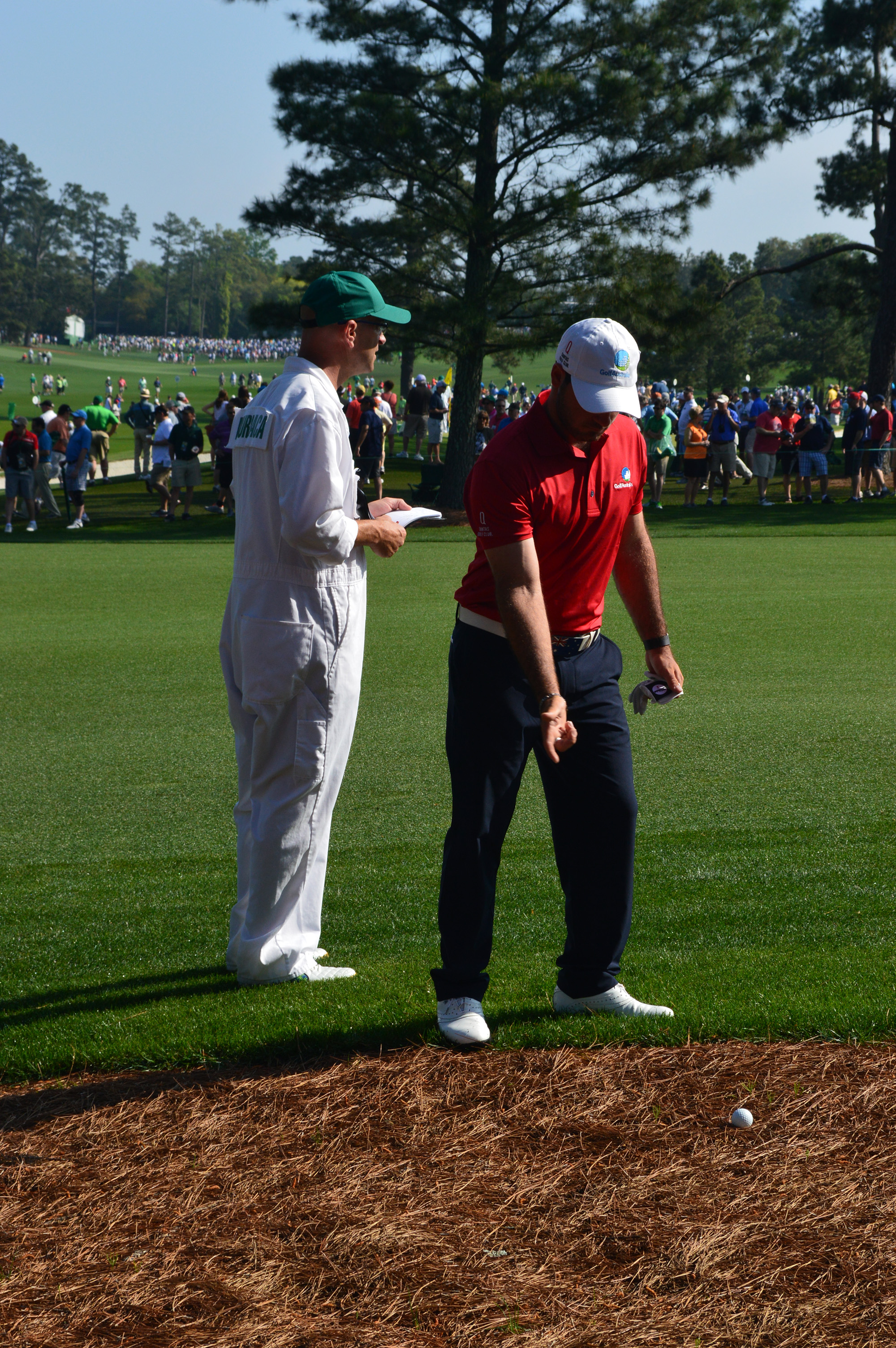
- Murdaca at the 2015 Masters Tournament

Personal information
- Nationality: Australia
- Born: 3 July 1995 (age 31)

Career
- Sport: Golf
- Turned professional: 2015

Best results in major championships
- Masters Tournament: CUT: 2015
- PGA Championship: DNP
- U.S. Open: DNP
- The Open Championship: DNP

Antonio "Anthony" Murdaca (born 3 July 1995) is an Australian professional golfer from South Australia.

== Career ==
Murdaca won the 2014 Asia-Pacific Amateur Championship which earned him an invitation to the 2015 Masters Tournament. At the Masters, he missed the cut.

Murdaca finished sixth in his title defense at the 2015 Asia-Pacific Amateur, after which he turned pro.

== Amateur wins ==
- 2010: South Australian Junior Masters, Australian Boys' Amateur
- 2011: Greg Norman Junior Masters
- 2012: South Australia Junior Masters
- 2013: South Australia Junior Masters, South Australia Junior Amateur, Australian Boys' Amateur
- 2014: Asia-Pacific Amateur Championship
- 2015: South Australia Amateur Classic

== Team appearances ==
Amateur

- Australian Men's Interstate Teams Matches (representing South Australia): 2010, 2011, 2012, 2013, 2014, 2015
