= Sammy Schmitz =

American golfer

Personal information
- Nationality: United States
- Born: September 9, 1980 (age 46) River Falls, Wisconsin, U.S.

Career
- Sport: Golf
- Status: Amateur

Best results in major championships
- Masters Tournament: CUT: 2016
- PGA Championship: DNP
- U.S. Open: DNP
- The Open Championship: DNP

Sammy Schmitz (born September 9, 1980) is an American amateur golfer who won the 2015 U.S. Mid-Amateur Golf Championship.

== College career ==
Schmitz was an NCAA Division III All-American at Saint John's College.

== Pro career ==
Schmitz briefly competed on the Hooters Tour.

== Amateur career ==
After his brief pro career, Schmitz regained his amateur status and won the 2015 U.S. Mid-Amateur to qualify for the 2016 Masters Tournament where he would shoot 81-75 to miss the cut.

== Outside of golf ==
Schmitz works full-time in the healthcare industry.

== Amateur wins ==
this list is probably incomplete

- 2016 U.S. Mid-Amateur
