= Danny Willett =

English professional golfer (born 1987)

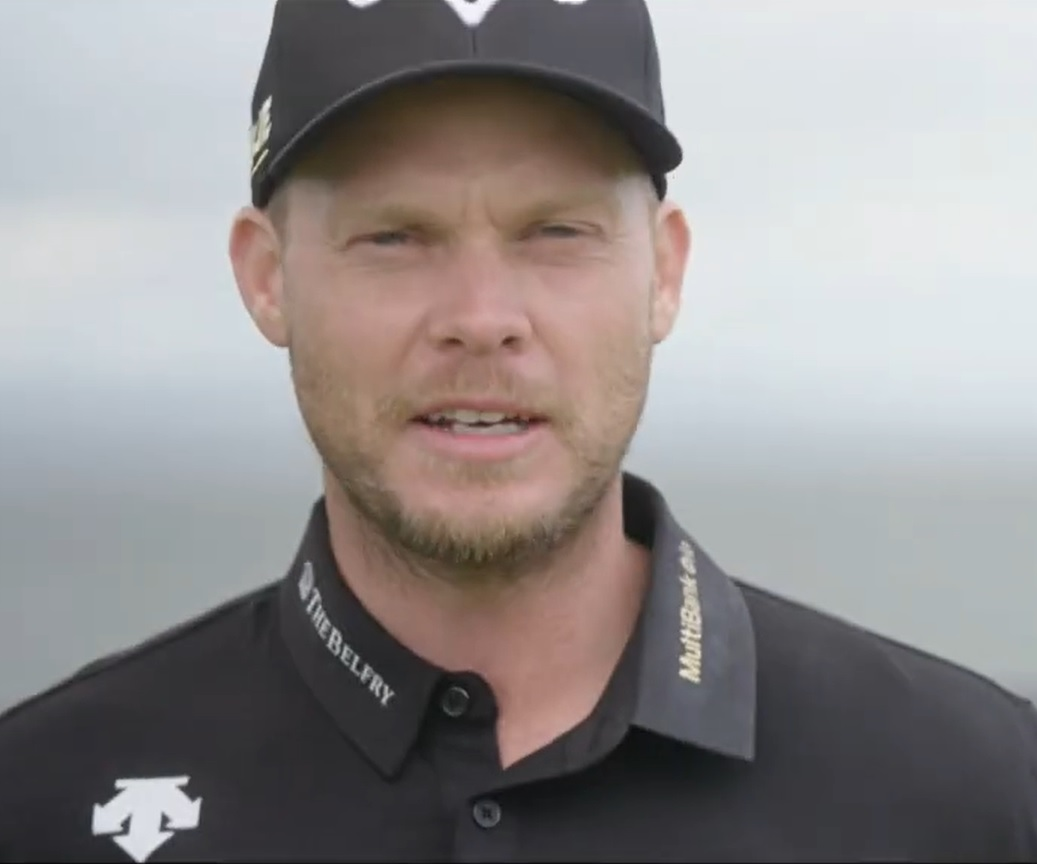
- Willett in 2023

Personal information
- Full name: Daniel John Willett
- Nationality: England
- Born: 3 October 1987 (age 39) Sheffield, Yorkshire, England
- Height: 5 ft 11 in (1.80 m)
- Weight: 83 kg (183 lb; 13.1 st)
- Spouse: Nicole Harris (m. 2013)
- Children: 2

Career
- Sport: Golf
- College: Jacksonville State University
- Turned professional: 2008
- Current tours: European Tour; PGA Tour
- Professional wins: 8
- Highest ranking: 9 (10 April 2016)

Number of wins by tour
- PGA Tour: 1
- European Tour: 8
- Asian Tour: 1
- Sunshine Tour: 1

Best results in major championships (wins: 1)
- Masters Tournament: Won: 2016
- PGA Championship: T30: 2014
- U.S. Open: T12: 2019
- The Open Championship: T6: 2015, 2019

Daniel John Willett (born 3 October 1987) is an English professional golfer who plays on the European Tour. In April 2016, he won his first major championship at the 2016 Masters Tournament, becoming only the second Englishman to achieve the feat and the first European in 17 years to win at Augusta National.

== Early life ==
Willett was born in Sheffield, Yorkshire, the third of four sons of Steve, a Church of England vicar and Elisabet, a teacher. In an interview with The Daily Telegraph in 2016 Willett recalled his introduction to golf; "We used to go to Anglesey to play a par three course in the middle of a sheep field." He was a member of Birley Wood Golf Club in his youth.

== Amateur career ==
As an amateur and member of Rotherham Golf Club (RGC), Willett won the English Amateur Championship in 2007 and competed in the 2007 Walker Cup at Royal County Down In acknowledgement of his achievements he was given life membership of RGC by the then Captain Michael E Stubley and fellow Directors of RGC. In March 2008 he became the number one ranked amateur in the world.

Willett secured a golf scholarship at Jacksonville State University (JSU) in Alabama. During his time with JSU, he was the 2006 Ohio Valley Conference Freshman of the Year and won medallist honours at the 2007 OVC Championship. He was a first-team All-OVC performer and a member of the OVC's All-Tournament Team in both seasons.

== Professional career ==
=== 2008–15 ===
Willett turned professional in May 2008, and earned his European Tour card for the 2009 season coming through qualifying school. Following a successful 2009, finishing 58th in the inaugural Race to Dubai with eight top-10s, Willett challenged at the 2010 BMW PGA Championship, taking the first-round lead before falling off the pace and finishing outright fifth, winning 190,800 euros. Following this performance, Willett moved into the top 100 of the Official World Golf Ranking for the first time. He finished the 2010 season ranked 23rd on the Order of Merit.

2011 proved to be a less successful season, with only one top ten placement in 30 competitions; he still managed to retain his tour membership comfortably with a final 91st place in the Order of Merit.

Willett's first victory on the European Tour came in June 2012 at the BMW International Open in Cologne. He defeated Marcus Fraser on the fourth extra hole of a sudden death play-off. In the same season he collected a second place at the Omega European Masters, a third place at the Maybank Malaysian Open and three additional top-ten finishes, that gave him the 23rd position at the final Order of Merit.

In 2013 and 2014 Willett established himself as one of the leading European players in the European Tour and in 2015 alone he collected seven top-ten finishes, and ended the year in 25th place in The Race to Dubai.

In December 2014 Willett won the Nedbank Golf Challenge in Sun City, South Africa and, with a third place at the 2015 WGC-Cadillac Match Play in May 2015, he earned a special temporary membership on the PGA Tour for the remainder of the 2015 season.

Through 36 holes at the 2015 Open Championship, Willett was one stroke off the lead of Dustin Johnson and was paired with him in the final group for the third round of the Championship. He only could muster an even-par 72 in the third round, however, and dropped down the leaderboard. A final round 70, moved him into a tie for sixth at the Old Course at St Andrews, his best finish in a major to that point.

In July 2015, Willett won his third European Tour title with a one-stroke victory over Matt Fitzpatrick at the Omega European Masters. Though he earned enough to qualify for a PGA Tour card, Willett declined to take PGA Tour membership for the 2015–16 season.

=== 2016: Masters victory ===
Willett won his first major championship at the 2016 Masters Tournament at Augusta National after shooting a five-under-par round of 67 to take advantage of a collapse by Jordan Spieth. Defending champion Spieth led by five shots as he approached the 10th hole of the final round. Willett took the lead when Spieth, who was leading by 1 shot from Willett, had a quadruple bogey 7 at the par-3 12th. Willett was the leader in the clubhouse at −5 when he posted a bogey-free final round of 67 and was crowned champion when Spieth finished at −2 alongside Lee Westwood. Willett became the first British player to win the Masters for 20 years, Nick Faldo having won in 1996. After being presented with the green jacket as champion, Willett said: "It was a very surreal day when you look back at the ebbs and flows." After his win, Willett accepted PGA Tour membership and rose to the 9th place of the Official World Golf Ranking.

Beside the first major win at the Masters, 2016 proved to be the most successful season for Willett. He collected his fourth win on the European Tour in February at the Dubai Desert Classic, and had a 2nd place at the 2016 Italian Open and a 3rd place at the BMW PGA Championship, establishing himself early in the season as leader of the Race to Dubai. With his position he also earned the automatic selection for the 2016 Ryder Cup.

Willett's Ryder Cup debut started with a controversy stirred by his brother Peter Willett in a National Club Golfer article in which he stated that "for the Americans to stand a chance of winning, they need their baying mob of imbeciles to caress their egos every step of the way"; Danny Willett successively distanced himself and apologised for his brother's comments, although he later defended his brother's comments as correct after the competition had completed. In the event, he played three matches without earning a point. In the Friday afternoon fourballs he teamed up with Martin Kaymer, losing by 5 and 4 to Brandt Snedeker and Brooks Koepka, on Saturday, he paired with Lee Westwood against J. B. Holmes and Ryan Moore in a 1 up loss in the fourballs; in the Sunday singles he lost again, by 5 and 4, to Koepka.

=== 2017 ===
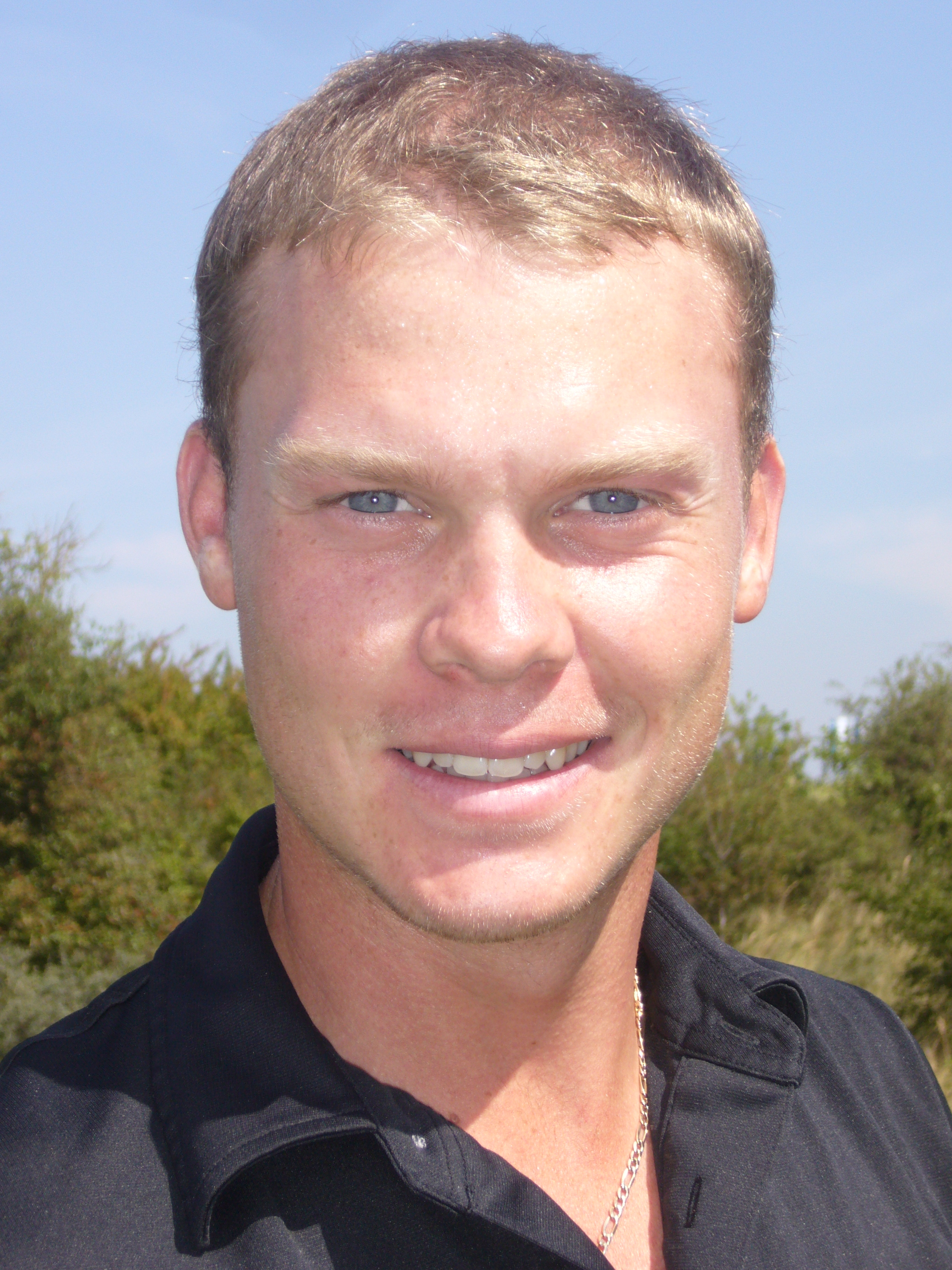
Willet in 2009

Seeking his first victory since his Masters win, Willett entered the final round of the 2017 Maybank Championship in Malaysia, with a three-stroke advantage over the field. In the final round, he was the only player in top 29 positions to shoot over par and finished in a tie for fifth, four strokes behind eventual winner, Fabrizio Zanotti.

In defence of his Masters title, Willett shot opening rounds of 73 and 78 for a total of seven-over-par. He missed the cut by one stroke, becoming the first defending champion to do so since Mike Weir in 2004.

Willett struggled with a back injury throughout the season, withdrawing from three tournaments, and ultimately lost his PGA Tour privileges having failed to make the required fifteen starts.

=== 2018 ===
Willett began the 2018 season with nine missed cuts and a withdrawal in his first twelve tournaments. After the 2018 BMW PGA Championship, Willett fell to 462nd in the Official World Golf Ranking. However, his play improved in the second half of the season. This culminated in a victory at the 2018 DP World Tour Championship, Dubai on 18 November 2018. The victory was part of the Rolex Series and worth $1,333,330.

=== 2019 ===
On 22 September, Willett won the BMW PGA Championship at Wentworth Golf Club in England. This win at the European Tour's flagship event brought Willett back into the top 50 of the Official World Golf Ranking.

=== 2020 ===
In the 2019–20 PGA Tour season, shortened due to the COVID-19 pandemic, Willett recorded one top-10 with a tied-fourth finish at the Rocket Mortgage Classic.

=== 2021 ===
In March, Willett recorded a top-10 at the Corales Puntacana Resort and Club Championship. Later in May, he hosted the Betfred British Masters at The Belfry, which was won by Richard Bland. In October, he won the Alfred Dunhill Links Championship by two shots ahead of Tyrrell Hatton and Joakim Lagergren.

=== 2022 ===
Willett was one of a number of players to regain PGA Tour privileges after others who joined LIV Golf were removed from the FedEx Cup standings. In September, Willett started the 2022–23 PGA Tour season at the Fortinet Championship. Holding a one shot lead on the final hole, Willett three-putted the final green for bogey, while Max Homa chipped in for birdie, ultimately giving Homa the title.

== Personal life ==
Willett married Nicole Harris in 2013. They reside in Rotherham, Yorkshire. Their first child, a son, was born in 2016, just a few days before his victory at the 2016 Masters. Their second child was born in 2018. Willett has described his father, Steve, as the best sports psychologist he has known. Willett is a supporter of Premier League club Liverpool. Willett is a member of Lindrick Golf Club.

== Amateur wins ==
- 2007 Yorkshire Amateur, English Amateur
- 2008 Australian Amateur Stroke Play Championship, Spanish International Amateur Championship

== Professional wins (8) ==
=== PGA Tour wins (1) ===
Legend
Major championships (1)
Other PGA Tour (0)

No.	Date	Tournament	Winning score	To par	Margin of victory	Runners-up
1	10 Apr 2016	Masters Tournament	70-74-72-67=283	−5	3 strokes	(United States) Jordan Spieth, (England) Lee Westwood

=== European Tour wins (8) ===
Legend
Major championships (1)
Flagship events (1)
Tour Championships (1)
Rolex Series (2) (Note: The 2018 DP World Tour Championship, Dubai and 2019 BMW PGA Championship were also Rolex Series tournaments.)
Other European Tour (5)

No.	Date	Tournament	Winning score	To par	Margin of victory	Runner(s)-up
1	24 Jun 2012	BMW International Open	65-70-69-73=277	−11	Playoff	(Australia) Marcus Fraser
2	7 Dec 2014 (2015 season)	Nedbank Golf Challenge^{1}	71-68-65-66=270	−18	4 strokes	(England) Ross Fisher
3	26 Jul 2015	Omega European Masters^{2}	65-62-71-65=263	−17	1 stroke	(England) Matt Fitzpatrick
4	7 Feb 2016	Omega Dubai Desert Classic	70-65-65-69=269	−19	1 stroke	(Spain) Rafa Cabrera-Bello, (England) Andy Sullivan
5	10 Apr 2016	Masters Tournament	70-74-72-67=283	−5	3 strokes	(United States) Jordan Spieth, (England) Lee Westwood
6	18 Nov 2018	DP World Tour Championship, Dubai	67-67-68-68=270	−18	2 strokes	(United States) Patrick Reed, (England) Matt Wallace
7	22 Sep 2019	BMW PGA Championship	68-65-68-67=268	−20	3 strokes	(Spain) Jon Rahm
8	3 Oct 2021	Alfred Dunhill Links Championship	67-69-66-68=270	−18	2 strokes	(England) Tyrrell Hatton, (Sweden) Joakim Lagergren

^{1}Co-sanctioned by the Sunshine Tour
^{2}Co-sanctioned by the Asian Tour

European Tour playoff record (1–0)

No.	Year	Tournament	Opponent	Result
1	2012	BMW International Open	(Australia) Marcus Fraser	Won with par on fourth extra hole

== Major championships ==
=== Wins (1) ===
Year	Championship	54 holes	Winning score	Margin	Runners-up
2016	Masters Tournament	3 shot deficit	−5 (70-74-72-67=283)	3 strokes	(United States) Jordan Spieth, (England) Lee Westwood

=== Results timeline ===
Tournament	2010	2011	2012	2013	2014	2015	2016	2017	2018
Masters Tournament						T38	1	CUT	CUT
U.S. Open					T45	CUT	T37	WD	CUT
The Open Championship		CUT		T15	CUT	T6	T53	76	T24
PGA Championship	CUT			T40	T30	T54	T79	CUT	CUT

Tournament	2019	2020	2021	2022	2023	2024	2025	2026
Masters Tournament	CUT	T25	CUT	T12	CUT	T45	T42	CUT
PGA Championship	T41	CUT	T64		CUT			
U.S. Open	T12	CUT						
The Open Championship	T6	NT	T33	T53	T68			

Win
Top 10
Did not play

CUT = missed the half-way cut
WD = withdrew
"T" = tied
NT = No tournament due to COVID-19 pandemic

=== Summary ===
Tournament	Wins	2nd	3rd	Top-5	Top-10	Top-25	Events	Cuts made
Masters Tournament	1	0	0	1	1	3	12	6
PGA Championship	0	0	0	0	0	0	11	6
U.S. Open	0	0	0	0	0	1	7	3
The Open Championship	0	0	0	0	2	4	11	9
Totals	1	0	0	1	3	8	41	24

- Most consecutive cuts made – 6 (2015 Open Championship – 2016 PGA)
- Longest streak of top-10s – 1 (three times)

== Results in The Players Championship ==
Tournament	2015	2016	2017	2018	2019	2020	2021	2022	2023
The Players Championship	CUT	CUT	WD	CUT	CUT	C			T27

WD = withdrew
CUT = missed the halfway cut
"T" = tied
C = Cancelled after the first round due to the COVID-19 pandemic

== Results in World Golf Championships ==
Results not in chronological order prior to 2015.

Tournament	2010	2011	2012	2013	2014	2015	2016	2017	2018	2019	2020
Championship						T12	T3	69		T27	T42
Match Play						3	T28	T39			NT^{1}
Invitational			T50			T17		76		T48	T69
Champions	T67		T62			T3	75			T73	NT^{1}

^{1}Cancelled due to COVID-19 pandemic

Top 10
Did not play

QF, R16, R32, R64 = Round in which player lost in match play
NT = No tournament
"T" = tied

== Team appearances ==
Amateur

- European Boys' Team Championship (representing England): 2005
- Jacques Léglise Trophy (representing Great Britain & Ireland): 2005
- Walker Cup (representing Great Britain & Ireland): 2007
- Bonallack Trophy (representing Europe): 2008 (winners)

Professional

- World Cup (representing England): 2013
- EurAsia Cup (representing Europe): 2016 (winners)
- Ryder Cup (representing Europe) : 2016

Ryder Cup points record

2016	Total
0	0

== See also ==
- 2008 European Tour Qualifying School graduates
- List of golfers with most European Tour wins
