= National Club Golfer =

National Golf Club

- Editor: Hannah Holden
- Categories: Golf Magazine
- Frequency: Monthly
- Circulation: 58,278 (ABC Jul - Dec 2014); Print and digital editions.
- Publisher: Sports Publications
- First issue: April 1994
- Country: United Kingdom
- Based in: Leeds
- Language: English
- Website: National Club Golfer

National Club Golfer is a monthly golfing magazine published by Sports Publications. It is the highest-circulated golf title in the UK. The headquarters is in Leeds.

== Overview ==
National Club Golfer magazine was launched by Sports Publications in April 1994.

The magazine started as a paper but changed to a glossy magazine in 1997. National Club Golfer, or NCG as it is known to regular readers, is the only magazine in the United Kingdom that is distributed to every golf club in England, Wales, and Scotland free of charge. It is also the highest-circulated print golf publication in the country, with a circulation of almost 60,000.

Sports Publications also put together a magazine dedicated to women's golf - Lady Golfer - which is the highest-circulated ladies' title in print and digital formats in the UK, going out to every club in England, Wales, and Scotland.

Based in Leeds, the magazines are aimed at club golfers.

In May 2005 both magazines launched a dedicated website featuring their content.
