= Gunn Yang =

South Korean golfer (born 1993)

Personal information
- Nationality: South Korea; United States
- Born: 30 September 1993 (age 33) Pyeongchang, South Korea
- Height: 1.80 m (5 ft 11 in)
- Weight: 75 kg (165 lb; 11.8 st)

Career
- Sport: Golf
- College: San Diego State University
- Turned professional: 2017

Best results in major championships
- Masters Tournament: CUT: 2015
- PGA Championship: DNP
- U.S. Open: CUT: 2015
- The Open Championship: CUT: 2015

Gunn Yang (Korean: 양건; born 30 September 1993) is a Korean-American professional golfer.

== Amateur career ==
In 2014, he won the U.S. Amateur, defeating Corey Conners, 2&1, in the final round of the championship at Atlanta Athletic Club. He became the second South Korean to claim the U.S. Amateur title.

== Professional career ==
Yang made his PGA Tour debut at the Farmers Insurance Open in February 2015 and also competed in Arnold Palmer Invitational, RBC Heritage, and The Masters. Yang made his first cut on the PGA Tour at the Crowne Plaza Invitational, where he was T-15th after 2nd round, but finished as T-65th. He competed in his first major championship in 2015, competing in the Masters Tournament and was cut after the second round.

Yang played on the European Challenge Tour in 2017. After a five-year absence, Yang returned to professional golf in 2023 on the PGA Tour Canada, which later became the PGA Tour Americas. His best result was a 2nd place at the 2024 Kia Open.

== Amateur wins (1) ==
- 2014 U.S. Amateur

== Results in major championships ==
Tournament	2015
Masters Tournament	CUT
U.S. Open	CUT
The Open Championship	CUT
PGA Championship	

Did not play

CUT = missed the half-way cut
"T" = tied
