= Latin America Amateur Championship =

Tournament information
- Location: Rotates through Latin America; Peru (2026)
- Established: 2015
- Course: Lima Golf Club (2026)
- Par: 70
- Length: 6,804 yards (6,222 m)
- Format: Stroke play
- Month played: January

Tournament record score
- Aggregate: 265 Mateo Fernández de Oliveira (2023)
- To par: −23 as above

Current champion
- (Argentina) Mateo Pulcini

The Latin America Amateur Championship (LAAC) is an annual amateur golf tournament, organized in conjunction with the Augusta National Golf Club, organizer of the Masters Tournament; The R&A, organizers of The Open Championship; and the United States Golf Association (USGA). It is played at various locations throughout Latin America and was first played in 2015.

The championship is played in January and consists of 72 holes of stroke-play, with a cut for the leading 50 players and ties after 36 holes. The winner receives an invitation to the Masters Tournament, The Open Championship (from 2020), The Amateur Championship, the U.S. Amateur and any other USGA event for which they are otherwise qualified apart from the U.S. Open. The winner and runner-up gain entry to final stage qualifying for the U.S. Open.

The field is restricted to players from the Latin American region (IOC-recognized countries and territories who are current members of the International Golf Federation) who have a handicap of 5.4 or less. The 29 countries are: Argentina, The Bahamas, Barbados, Bermuda, Bolivia, Brazil, Cayman Islands, Chile, Colombia, Costa Rica, Dominican Republic, Ecuador, El Salvador, Guatemala, Haiti, Honduras, Jamaica, Mexico, Nicaragua, Panama, Paraguay, Peru, Puerto Rico, Saint Lucia, Trinidad and Tobago, Turks and Caicos Islands, Uruguay, U.S. Virgin Islands, and Venezuela. Each country is allocated two spots in the field based on the World Amateur Golf Rankings (WAGR). The remainder of the field is filled from the WAGR with a limit of six entries per country (10 for the host country).

== Winners ==
Year	Player	Score	Margin of victory	Runner(s)-up	Venue	Location
2026	(Argentina) Mateo Pulcini	275 (–5)	Playoff	(Venezuela) Virgilio Paz	Lima Golf Club	Lima, Peru
2025	(Cayman Islands) Justin Hastings	272 (−16)	1 stroke	(Peru) Patrick Sparks	Pilar Golf Club	Pilar, Buenos Aires Province, Argentina
2024	(Mexico) Santiago de la Fuente	270 (−10)	2 strokes	(Mexico) Omar Morales	Santa Maria Golf Club	Panama City, Panama
2023	(Argentina) Mateo Fernández de Oliveira	265 (−23)	4 strokes	(Mexico) Luis Carrera	Grand Reserve Golf Club	Río Grande, Puerto Rico
2022	(Cayman Islands) Aaron Jarvis	281 (−7)	1 stroke	(Brazil) Fred Biondi (Mexico) Santiago de la Fuente (Argentina) Vicente Marzilio (Argentina) Mateo Fernández de Oliveira	Casa de Campo	La Romana, Dominican Republic
2021	Cancelled				Lima Golf Club	Lima, Peru
2020	(Argentina) Abel Gallegos	281 (−4)	4 strokes	(Mexico) Aaron Terrazas	El Camaleón Golf Club	Playa del Carmen, Mexico
2019	(Mexico) Álvaro Ortiz	274 (−14)	2 strokes	(Costa Rica) Luis Gagne	Casa de Campo	La Romana, Dominican Republic
2018	(Chile) Joaquín Niemann	273 (−11)	5 strokes	(Mexico) Álvaro Ortiz	Prince of Wales Country Club	Santiago, Chile
2017	(Chile) Toto Gana	279 (−1)	Playoff	(Chile) Joaquín Niemann (Mexico) Álvaro Ortiz	Club de Golf de Panamá	Panama City, Panama
2016	(Costa Rica) Paul Chaplet	285 (−3)	1 stroke	(Venezuela) Jorge García	Casa de Campo	La Romana, Dominican Republic
2015	(Chile) Matías Domínguez	277 (−11)	1 stroke	(Argentina) Alejandro Tosti	Pilar Golf Club	Pilar, Buenos Aires Province, Argentina
