= 2019 European Tour Qualifying School graduates =

Golf qualifying tournament in Spain

2019 European Tour Qualifying School Final Stage
Tournament information
- Dates: 15–20 November 2019
- Location: Tarragona, Spain; 41.079°N 1.162°E
- Courses: Lumine Golf Club (Lakes & Hills Courses)
- Tours: European Tour (unofficial event)

Statistics
- Par: 71 (L); 72 (H)
- Length: 6,909 yards (6,318 m) (L); 6,975 yards (6,378 m) (H)
- Field: 156, 77 after cut
- Cut: 282 (−4)

Champion
- (Denmark) Benjamin Poke
- 403 (−25)
- Location in Spain Location in Catalonia

The 2019 European Tour Qualifying School graduates were determined following the conclusion of the 2019 European Tour Qualifying School Final Stage which was played 15–20 November at Lumine Golf Club in Tarragona, Spain. It was the 44th edition of the European Tour Qualifying School. The top 25 and ties (28 in total) earned status to play on the 2020 European Tour, with the remaining players who finished outside the top 25 and ties, but having made the 72-hole cut, earning status to play on the 2020 Challenge Tour.

Benjamin Poke won the event, scoring a six-round total of 403 (25 under par).

Graduates who went on to win on the European Tour in 2020 and 2021, (Note: Due to the effects of the COVID-19 pandemic on the 2020 European Tour season, all of the graduates retained the same status in 2021 except Rasmus Højgaard and Sami Välimäki, who were promoted to the winners category after their victories. In 2021, Q School was cancelled for a second straight year, limiting the normal changes in European Tour membership between seasons. Except for Välimäki, whose win in 2020 gave him an exemption through 2023, all of the 2019 Q School graduates that failed to finish in the top 121 of the Race to Dubai retained conditional status for 2022.) included Rasmus Højgaard at the AfrAsia Bank Mauritius Open in December 2019, the 2020 ISPS Handa UK Championship and the 2021 Omega European Masters. Sami Välimäki also won the Oman Open in 2020. 2021 victories included Marcus Armitage at the Porsche European Open, Jonathan Caldwell at the Scandinavian Mixed and Johannes Veerman at the D+D Real Czech Masters.

== Results ==
The top 25 players (including ties) earned status to play on the 2020 European Tour. They were as follows:

Place	Player	Score	To par
1	(Denmark) Benjamin Poke	67-67-69-67-69-64=403	−25
2	(France) Grégory Havret	68-70-71-66-68-66=409	−19
3	(Spain) Alejandro Cañizares	66-71-74-64-68-67=410	−18
4	(India) Shiv Chawrasia	69-66-71-67-69-69=411	−17
T5	(Denmark) Rasmus Højgaard	73-68-71-68-66-66=412	−16
T5	(England) Laurie Canter	68-71-70-70-66-67=412	−16
T5	(Canada) Aaron Cockerill	73-66-69-67-68-69=412	−16
T8	(France) Robin Sciot-Siegrist	68-71-72-67-67-68=413	−15
T8	(Spain) Carlos Pigem	71-66-73-66-69-68=413	−15
T8	(South Korea) Choi Jin-ho	68-72-69-64-70-70=413	−15
T8	(France) Adrien Saddier	68-72-67-67-68-71=413	−15
T8	(Finland) Sami Välimäki	67-68-73-65-68-72=413	−15
T13	(United States) Johannes Veerman	74-74-67-67-66-66=414	−14
T13	(England) Garrick Porteous	70-71-70-68-68-67=414	−14
T13	(Australia) Jake McLeod	70-69-68-70-67-70=414	−14
T13	(England) Marcus Armitage	68-72-69-65-69-71=414	−14
T17	(United States) Sihwan Kim	73-70-68-71-70-63=415	−13
T17	(Portugal) Pedro Figueiredo	68-70-69-71-71-66=415	−13
T17	(Northern Ireland) Jonathan Caldwell	71-69-72-67-69-67=415	−13
T17	(Wales) Bradley Dredge	70-71-69-69-69-67=415	−13
T17	(England) Dave Coupland	69-71-71-67-69-68=415	−13
T17	(South Africa) Darren Fichardt	71-72-68-71-64-69=415	−13
T17	(Netherlands) Lars van Meijel	69-71-65-70-71-69=415	−13
T17	(England) Toby Tree	67-67-72-68-69-72=415	−13
T25	(Sweden) Rikard Karlberg	72-70-71-69-68-66=416	−12
T25	(Sweden) Niklas Lemke	67-70-72-72-69-66=416	−12
T25	(England) Dale Whitnell	69-70-73-66-70-68=416	−12
T25	(France) Jean-Baptiste Gonnet	66-72-75-65-69-69=416	−12

The following players made the 72 hole cut, however finished outside the top 25 and ties, therefore earning status to play on the 2020 Challenge Tour.

- (Australia) Jarryd Felton (T29)
- (Scotland) Daniel Young (T29)
- (Isle of Man) Tom Gandy (T29)
- (South Africa) Wilco Nienaber (T29)
- (Germany) Hurly Long (T29)
- (Scotland) Craig Howie (T34)
- (France) Matthieu Fenasse (T34)
- (England) Steven Tiley (T34)
- (Italy) Lorenzo Scalise (T34)
- (Sweden) Philip Eriksson (T38)
- (Germany) Marcel Siem (T38)
- (Netherlands) Wil Besseling (T38)
- (Sweden) Robin Petersson (T38)
- (Germany) Nicolai von Dellingshausen (T38)
- (Germany) Marcel Schneider (T38)
- (Republic of Ireland) Gavin Moynihan (T44)
- (South Africa) Bryce Easton (T44)
- (South Africa) Louis de Jager (T44)
- (Chile) Hugo León (T44)
- (England) David Dixon (T44)
- (Republic of Ireland) Niall Kearney (T44)
- (Netherlands) Robbie van West (T44)
- (Sweden) Anton Karlsson (T51)
- (United States) John Catlin (T51)
- (Scotland) Marc Warren (T51)
- (England) Matthew Baldwin (T51)
- (Finland) Janne Kaske (T51)
- (Denmark) Nicolai Højgaard (T51)
- (South Korea) Kim Min-kyu (T57)
- (England) Daniel Gavins (T57)
- (Scotland) Ewen Ferguson (T57)
- (England) Jordan Wrisdale (T57)
- (Portugal) José-Filipe Lima (T57)
- (Czech Republic) Stanislav Matuš (T62)
- (Sweden) Jesper Sandborg (T62)
- (South Africa) Garrick Higgo (T62)
- (Australia) Dimitrios Papadatos (T65)
- (Scotland) Euan Walker (T65)
- (Italy) Aron Zemmer (67)
- (France) Thomas Linard (T68)
- (England) Ben Stow (T68)
- (France) Ugo Coussaud (T68)
- (Spain) Pedro Oriol (T68)
- (Australia) Deyen Lawson (72)
- (South Korea) Lee Tae-hee (73)
- (United States) Berry Henson (74)
- (France) Gary Stal (75)
- (United States) Chase Hanna (76)
- (South Africa) J. C. Ritchie (WD)

== Graduates ==
Place	Player	Career ET starts	Cuts made	Best finish
1	(Denmark) Benjamin Poke (Note: European Tour rookie in 2020)	1	0	CUT
2	(France) Grégory Havret	507	296	Win (x3)
3	(Spain) Alejandro Cañizares	315	214	Win (x2)
4	(India) Shiv Chawrasia	239	97	Win (x4)
T5	(Denmark) Rasmus Højgaard	3	0	CUT
T5	(England) Laurie Canter	70	33	T14
T5	(Canada) Aaron Cockerill	3	2	T19
T8	(France) Robin Sciot-Siegrist	4	2	T39
T8	(Spain) Carlos Pigem	81	35	T5
T8	(South Korea) Choi Jin-ho	51	29	T2
T8	(France) Adrien Saddier	92	53	4th
T8	(Finland) Sami Välimäki	1	0	CUT
T13	(United States) Johannes Veerman (Note: First-time full European Tour member in 2020, but ineligible for rookie status)	25	13	4th
T13	(England) Garrick Porteous	30	11	T9
T13	(Australia) Jake McLeod	33	20	T8
T13	(England) Marcus Armitage	37	16	T10
T17	(United States) Sihwan Kim	67	37	3rd
T17	(Portugal) Pedro Figueiredo	49	20	T23
T17	(Northern Ireland) Jonathan Caldwell	16	5	T31
T17	(Wales) Bradley Dredge	481	319	Win (x2)
T17	(England) Dave Coupland	6	1	T11
T17	(South Africa) Darren Fichardt	380	215	Win (x5)
T17	(Netherlands) Lars van Meijel	3	0	CUT
T17	(England) Toby Tree	13	6	T14
T25	(Sweden) Rikard Karlberg	146	80	Win
T25	(Sweden) Niklas Lemke	52	22	3rd
T25	(England) Dale Whitnell	11	5	T4
T25	(France) Jean-Baptiste Gonnet	188	101	T2

=== 2020 and 2021 European Tour results ===
Player	2020 European Tour					2021 European Tour				
Player	Starts	Cuts made	Best finish	R2D rank	Points	Starts	Cuts made	Best finish	R2D rank	Points
(Denmark) Benjamin Poke	22	10	T17	180	133	22	8	T7	182	140
(France) Grégory Havret	13	7	T21	203	78	14	3	T45	240	36
(Spain) Alejandro Cañizares	21	10	T6	132	251	24	15	3rd/T3 (x2)	98	502
(India) Shiv Chawrasia	7	3	T25	216	63	13	4	T15	237	40
(Denmark) Rasmus Højgaard	19	10	Win (x2)	16	1,271	19	14	Win	35	1,124
(England) Laurie Canter	17	12	2nd/T2 (x2)	19	1,113	22	14	T2	24	1,363
(Canada) Aaron Cockerill	21	14	T4	118	291	22	12	T17	152	236
(France) Robin Sciot-Siegrist	18	9	T3 (x2)	123	281	21	11	T12	169	184
(Spain) Carlos Pigem	20	10	T5	193	104	22	6	T47	230	54
(South Korea) Choi Jin-ho	2	0	CUT			0	0	DNP		
(France) Adrien Saddier	20	9	3rd	94	391	19	7	T7	170	182
(Finland) Sami Välimäki	19	14	Win	11	1,553	22	9	T21	159	208
(United States) Johannes Veerman	19	15	T4	78	447	22	13	Win	31	1,217
(England) Garrick Porteous	19	7	T4	145	204	23	13	T10	151	240
(Australia) Jake McLeod	15	7	6th	172	146	16	3	T47	261	19
(England) Marcus Armitage	23	18	3rd	57	649	25	19	Win	42	1,050
(United States) Sihwan Kim	11	7	T9	191	111	22	13	T10 (x2)	138	282
(Portugal) Pedro Figueiredo	19	10	T17	183	123	22	7	T10	199	107
(Northern Ireland) Jonathan Caldwell	21	14	T5	113	310	26	14	Win	95	515
(Wales) Bradley Dredge	2	0	CUT			6	3	T28	235	42
(England) Dave Coupland	18	13	T9	150	194	21	9	T3	136	296
(South Africa) Darren Fichardt	8	6	T11 (x2)	189	114	13	11	T2	117	394
(Netherlands) Lars van Meijel	21	11	T7	154	181	21	11	7th	174	165
(England) Toby Tree	20	11	T14	174	139	19	9	T16	205	93
(Sweden) Rikard Karlberg	17	12	T14 (x2)	146	202	21	7	2nd	90	530
(Sweden) Niklas Lemke	19	12	T3	89	406	19	10	T7	160	207
(England) Dale Whitnell	21	11	T4	115	295	23	16	T4	106	446
(France) Jean-Baptiste Gonnet	7	2	T24	267	23	15	9	T5	165	192

T = Tied
Player retained his European Tour card for 2022 (finished inside the top 121 in 2021, or won)
Player did not retain his European Tour card for 2022, but retained conditional status (finished outside the top 121 in 2021)

=== 2020 and 2021 European Tour winners ===
No.	Date	Player	Tournament	Winning score	Margin of victory	Runner(s)-up
1	8 Dec 2019	(Denmark) Rasmus Højgaard	AfrAsia Bank Mauritius Open	−19 (66-69-66-68=269)	Playoff	(Italy) Renato Paratore (France) Antoine Rozner
2	1 Mar 2020	(Finland) Sami Välimäki	Oman Open	−13 (74-67-64-70=275)	Playoff	(South Africa) Brandon Stone
3	30 Aug 2020	(Denmark) Rasmus Højgaard (2)	ISPS Handa UK Championship	−14 (73-69-67-65=274)	Playoff	(South Africa) Justin Walters
4	7 Jun 2021	(England) Marcus Armitage	Porsche European Open	−8 (72-71-65=208)	2 strokes	(Belgium) Thomas Detry (Italy) Edoardo Molinari (England) Matthew Southgate (Netherlands) Darius van Driel
5	13 Jun 2021	(Northern Ireland) Jonathan Caldwell	Scandinavian Mixed	−17 (70-67-70-64=271)	1 stroke	(Spain) Adrián Otaegui
6	22 Aug 2021	(United States) Johannes Veerman	D+D Real Czech Masters	−15 (71-66-68-68=273)	2 strokes	(United States) Sean Crocker (Finland) Tapio Pulkkanen
7	29 Aug 2021	(Denmark) Rasmus Højgaard (3)	Omega European Masters	−13 (68-66-70-63=267)	1 stroke	(Austria) Bernd Wiesberger

=== 2020 and 2021 European Tour runner-up finishes ===
No.	Date	Player	Tournament	Winner	Winning score	Runner-up score
1	25 Jul 2020	(Denmark) Rasmus Højgaard	Betfred British Masters	(Italy) Renato Paratore	−18 (65-66-66-69=266)	−15 (66-67-66-70=269)
2	23 Aug 2020	(Finland) Sami Välimäki	ISPS Handa Wales Open	(France) Romain Langasque	−8 (71-68-72-65=276)	−6 (70-72-67-69=278)
3	13 Sep 2020	(England) Laurie Canter	Portugal Masters	(South Africa) George Coetzee	−16 (66-70-66-66=268)	−14 (64-72-68-66=270)
4	25 Oct 2020	(England) Laurie Canter (2)	Italian Open	(England) Ross McGowan	−20 (66-64-67-71=268)	−19 (60-68-69-72=269)
5	14 Mar 2021	(South Africa) Darren Fichardt	Commercial Bank Qatar Masters	(France) Antoine Rozner	−8 (69-72-68-67=276)	−7 (68-68-70-71=277)
6	4 Jul 2021	(Sweden) Rikard Karlberg	Dubai Duty Free Irish Open	(Australia) Lucas Herbert	−19 (64-67-70-68=269)	−16 (71-67-67-67=272)
7	12 Sep 2021	(England) Laurie Canter (3)	BMW PGA Championship	(United States) Billy Horschel	−19 (70-65-69-65=269)	−18 (67-66-70-67=270)

== See also ==
- 2019 Challenge Tour graduates
