= Aphrodite Hills =

Coastal resort in Cyprus

Coordinates: 34.68232031°N 32.60889141°E

Aphrodite Hills Resort is a coastal resort in the Paphos district of Cyprus. The resort is named after the goddess Aphrodite and is 1 mile (1.6 km) away from Aphrodite's Rock.

The facilities are built across two plateaus divided by a ravine. It is designed to resemble a historic Mediterranean town with Greco-Roman architecture featuring locally quarried stone. The town square had been built to replicate a local plateia and has a market, restaurants, souvenir shops, a chapel, gardens, fountains, and an art gallery. The resort also has a spa, golf course, and leisure facilities.

In 2020, Aphrodite Hills hosted the Cyprus Open and the Cyprus Showdown, two back-to-back one-off European Tour golf tournaments added to fill the 2020 season schedule as many regular tournaments were cancelled due to the COVID-19 pandemic.

== Facilities and Events ==
The Retreat Spa was built in a classic Greco-Roman style.

The resort has an 18-hole, championship standard, golf course (230–hectare) and was licensed to become the PGA National Cyprus.

There are multi purpose courts and facilities are available for activities including tennis, basketball, and various other sports.

Aphrodite Hills hosts West End shows, festivities, cultural events, and other plays.

== Awards ==
Aphrodite Hills has received two international listings in 2010. The InterContinental Aphrodite Hills Resort Hotel and The Retreat spa were both listed in Condé Nast Traveller's Gold Lists for 2010.

The InterContinental Aphrodite Hills Resort Hotel was named 'Best European Hotel for Leisure Activities' in Condé Nast Traveller's 2010 Gold List. Additionally, The Retreat Spa was named third best Hotel Spa in Europe, Asia Minor and the Russian Federation, at the Condé Nast Traveller Readers' Spa Awards and was also listed in the publication's 2010 Gold List for the Best Spas.

== See also ==
- Kouklia
- Polis, Cyprus
- Coral Bay, Cyprus
- Cypriot wine
