= Cyprus Showdown =

2020 professional golf tournament in Cyprus

Coordinates: 34.683°N 32.608°E

Aphrodite Hills Cyprus Showdown
Tournament information
- Location: Paphos, Cyprus
- Established: 2020
- Course: Aphrodite Hills Resort
- Par: 71
- Length: 6,878 yd (6,289 m)
- Tour: European Tour
- Format: Stroke play
- Prize fund: €1,000,000
- Month played: November
- Final year: 2020

Tournament record score
- Aggregate: 64 Robert MacIntyre (2020)
- To par: −7 as above

Final champion
- (Scotland) Robert MacIntyre

Location map
- Location in Cyprus

The Aphrodite Hills Cyprus Showdown was a professional golf tournament that was held 5–8 November 2020 at the Aphrodite Hills Resort, in Paphos, Cyprus. The tournament was contested over 72-holes of stroke play but featured a novel elimination format.

The tournament, promoted by International Sports Management, was initially announced as the Cyprus Classic and was intended to be a one-off event on the European Tour calendar during the 2020 season. It was the second of two tournaments in Cyprus, held the week after the Aphrodite Hills Cyprus Open at the same venue.

Robert MacIntyre shot a final round 64 to claim the title; one stroke better than Masahiro Kawamura.

== Format ==
The Cyprus Showdown was contested over 72-holes of stroke play but featured a novel elimination format. The players with the lowest 32 scores after 36-holes progressed, however their scores were not carried forward. After a further 18 holes, the top 16 players qualified through to the final round, for which the scores were reset again.

== Winners ==
Year	Winner	Score	To par	Margin of victory	Runner-up
2020	(Scotland) Robert MacIntyre	64	−7	1 stroke	(Japan) Masahiro Kawamura
