= David Llewellyn (golfer) =

Welsh golfer

Personal information
- Full name: David John Llewellyn
- Nationality: Wales
- Born: 18 November 1951 (age 74) Dover, Kent, England

Career
- Sport: Golf
- Turned professional: 1968
- Former tour: European Tour
- Professional wins: 13

Number of wins by tour
- European Tour: 1
- Challenge Tour: 2
- Other: 10

Best results in major championships
- Masters Tournament: DNP
- PGA Championship: DNP
- U.S. Open: DNP
- The Open Championship: T56: 1972

Achievements and awards
- Sir Henry Cotton Rookie of the Year: 1971

David John Llewellyn (born 18 November 1951) is a Welsh professional golfer.

== Career ==
Llewellyn played on the European Tour in the 1970s after being named the Sir Henry Cotton Rookie of the Year in 1971. He achieved a personal best ranking of 39th on the Order or Merit in 1974, but did not win any tournaments in this period. After a spell as a club professional at Craythorne Golf Centre (1975–78), Royal Malta Golf Club (1978–81) and Thirsk and Northallerton Golf Club (1982–84), he returned to tournament golf in 1984, and collected several tournament victories during the following years. His sole win on the main European Tour was the 1988 AGF Biarritz Open, when he set a tour record four round total of 258. The scoring record was tied by Llewellyn's countryman Ian Woosnam in 1990 and not beaten until more than 32 years later, when Andy Sullivan scored 257 at the 2020 English Championship.

Llewellyn also won the 1987 Vernon's tournament in Merseyside, on the informal European satellite tour which existed before the official Challenge Tour was founded, and the 1991 Ivory Coast Open, which was a Challenge Tour event. However the highlight of his career was perhaps winning the World Cup of Golf for Wales alongside Ian Woosnam in 1987.

Llewellyn left the tour for a second time in the early 1990s to return to being a club professional. He later became National Coach to the Golf Union of Wales between 2002 and 2007. He has been honoured with the Captaincy of the Professional Golfers Association (PGA) in 2026–27.

== Awards and honors ==
In 1971, Llewellyn earned the British PGA's Sir Henry Cotton Rookie of the Year award.

== Professional wins (13) ==
=== European Tour wins (1) ===
| No. | Date | Tournament | Winning score | Margin of victory | Runner-up |
|---|---|---|---|---|---|
| 1 | 3 Apr 1988 | AGF Biarritz Open | −14 (64-69-60-65=258) | 7 strokes | (Republic of Ireland) Christy O'Connor Jnr |

European Tour playoff record (0–1)

| No. | Year | Tournament | Opponent | Result |
|---|---|---|---|---|
| 1 | 1985 | Compagnie de Chauffe Cannes Open | (England) Robert Lee | Lost to par on first extra hole |

=== Challenge Tour wins (2) ===
| No. | Date | Tournament | Winning score | Margin of victory | Runner-up |
|---|---|---|---|---|---|
| 1 | 1 Oct 1989 | Motorola Classic | −12 (65-69-71-67=272) | 4 strokes | (England) David Williams |
| 2 | 16 Dec 1990 (1991 season) | Ivory Coast Open | −13 (67-66-71-71=275) | 2 strokes | (England) Jeff Pinsent |

=== Safari Circuit wins (2) ===
| No. | Date | Tournament | Winning score | Margin of victory | Runner-up |
|---|---|---|---|---|---|
| 1 | 17 Feb 1985 | Ivory Coast Open | −11 (67-70-71-69=277) | 1 stroke | (Scotland) Brian Gunson |
| 2 | 27 Feb 1988 | Zambia Open | −12 (72-70-68-70=280) | 1 stroke | (England) Richard Fish |

=== Other wins (8) ===
- 1969 Warwickshire Assistants Championship, Warwickshire Assistants Matchplay
- 1970 Midland Professional Championship
- 1972 Kenya Open
- 1985 Welsh Professional Championship
- 1987 Vernons Open, World Cup (with Ian Woosnam)
- 1994 Cheshire and North Wales Open

== Results in major championships ==
| Tournament | 1971 | 1972 | 1973 | 1974 | 1975 | 1976 | 1977 | 1978 | 1979 |
|---|---|---|---|---|---|---|---|---|---|
| The Open Championship | CUT | T56 | | CUT | | | | | |

| Tournament | 1980 | 1981 | 1982 | 1983 | 1984 | 1985 | 1986 | 1987 | 1988 | 1989 |
|---|---|---|---|---|---|---|---|---|---|---|
| The Open Championship | | | | | CUT | CUT | CUT | CUT | | CUT |

Note: Llewellyn only played in The Open Championship.

Did not play

CUT = missed the half-way cut
"T" = tied

== Team appearances ==
- World Cup (representing Wales): 1974, 1985, 1987 (winners), 1988
- Double Diamond International (representing Wales): 1971, 1972, 1974, 1975, 1976, 1977
- Philip Morris International (representing Wales): 1975
- Hennessy Cognac Cup (representing Wales): 1984
- Alfred Dunhill Cup (representing Wales): 1985, 1988, 1989
- PGA Cup (representing Great Britain and Ireland): 2000 (non-playing captain)
