= Andy Sullivan (golfer) =

English professional golfer (born 1987)

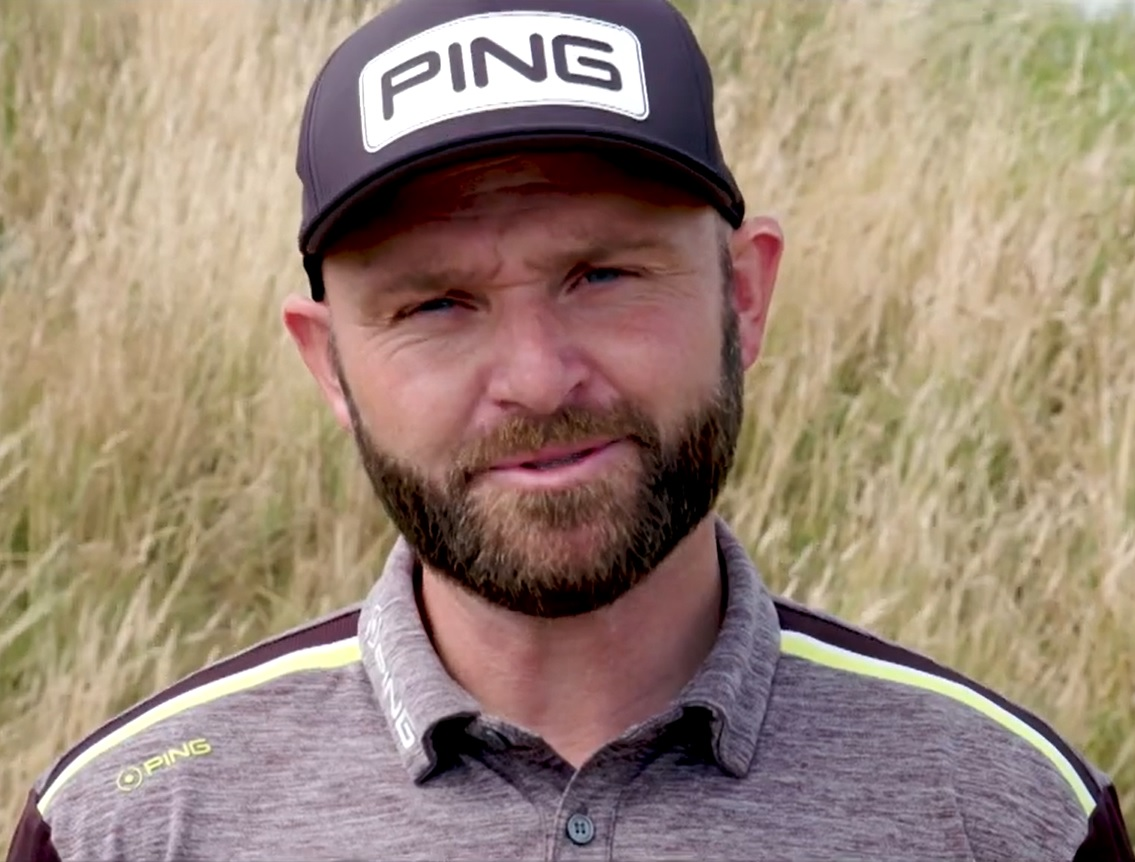
- Sullivan in 2023

Personal information
- Full name: Andrew Michael Sullivan
- Nationality: England
- Born: 19 May 1987 (age 39) Nuneaton, Warwickshire, England
- Height: 1.75 m (5 ft 9 in)
- Weight: 72 kg (159 lb; 11.3 st)

Career
- Sport: Golf
- Turned professional: 2011
- Current tours: European Tour; PGA Tour
- Professional wins: 5
- Highest ranking: 28 (7 February 2016)

Number of wins by tour
- European Tour: 4
- Sunshine Tour: 2
- Other: 1

Best results in major championships
- Masters Tournament: T48: 2017
- PGA Championship: T49: 2016
- U.S. Open: T23: 2016
- The Open Championship: T12: 2016

Andrew Michael Sullivan (born 19 May 1987) is an English professional golfer who currently plays on the European Tour.

== Amateur career ==
Sullivan had a successful amateur career before turning professional. He won the individual title in the Tailhade Cup in Argentina in 2010, and won the 2011 New South Wales Medal in Australia. Sullivan's biggest win as an amateur came at the 2011 Scottish Amateur Stroke Play Championship.

In 2011, Sullivan represented the winning Great Britain and Ireland team at the 2011 Walker Cup, where he lost 3&2 to Jordan Spieth in the singles.

== Professional career ==
Sullivan turned professional in 2011; in that year he played four European Tour events before entering the 2011 qualifying school where he obtained the tour card with a 3rd-place finish.

In 2012, Sullivan finished in 145th place in the Race to Dubai without a top-10 finish. He secured his place on the European Tour for 2013 at the 2012 qualifying school.

In 2013, Sullivan finished 98th on the Race to Dubai with his best finish being a tie for third at the Alfred Dunhill Championship.

In 2014, Sullivan finished 33rd on the Race to Dubai including a second-place finishing at the Trophée Hassan II, a third place at the KLM Open, and three more top-10 placements. During that season, Sullivan hit a hole-in-one at the KLM Open earning him a flight into space.

Sullivan's first European Tour win came in January 2015 at the South African Open. Sullivan won the event in a playoff against South African Charl Schwartzel who had started the final round seven strokes ahead of Sullivan. Sullivan quickly followed this success with wins at the 2015 Joburg Open in March and the Portugal Masters in October, which was a wire-to-wire victory by nine strokes. He became the first man to record three victories on the European Tour in 2015, finishing with an 8th place in the final Order of Merit . In February 2016, he advanced to a career best 28th in the Official World Golf Ranking.

Thanks to his results on the 2015 and 2016 seasons of the European Tour he obtained an automatic selection for the 2016 Ryder Cup.

In August 2020, Sullivan secured his first victory in five years at the English Championship, a new event created as part of a UK Swing after the European Tour reorganised the 2020 season due to the COVID-19 pandemic. His score of 257 over 72 holes was at the time the lowest score in a European Tour tournament on European soil, beating the previous best of 258, shared by David Llewellyn in 1988 and Ian Woosnam in 1990.

== Amateur wins ==
- 2010 individual title in the Tailhade Cup
- 2011 New South Wales Medal, Scottish Amateur Stroke Play Championship

== Professional wins (5) ==
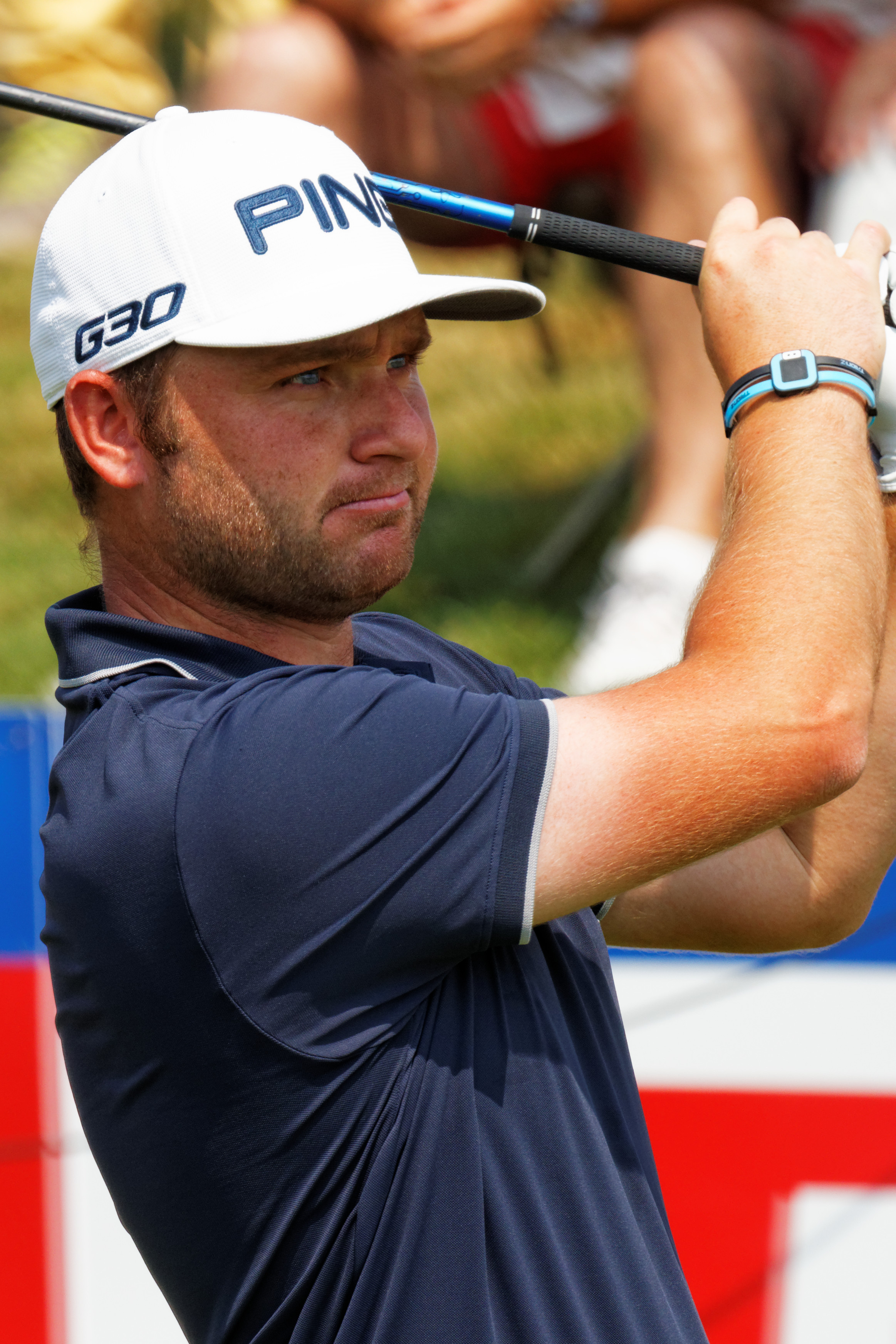
Sullivan in 2015

=== European Tour wins (4) ===
No.	Date	Tournament	Winning score	Margin of victory	Runner(s)-up
1	11 Jan 2015	South African Open Championship^{1}	−11 (66-70-74-67=277)	Playoff	(South Africa) Charl Schwartzel
2	1 Mar 2015	Joburg Open^{1}	−17 (71-65-68-66=270)	2 strokes	(South Africa) Wallie Coetsee, (England) David Howell, (Republic of Ireland) Kevin Phelan, (South Africa) Jaco van Zyl, (England) Anthony Wall
3	18 Oct 2015	Portugal Masters	−23 (64-64-67-66=261)	9 strokes	(England) Chris Wood
4	9 Aug 2020	English Championship	−27 (66-62-64-65=257)	7 strokes	(Spain) Adrián Otaegui

^{1}Co-sanctioned by the Sunshine Tour

European Tour playoff record (1–0)

No.	Year	Tournament	Opponent	Result
1	2015	South African Open Championship	(South Africa) Charl Schwartzel	Won with birdie on first extra hole

=== Clutch Pro Tour wins (1) ===
No.	Date	Tournament	Winning score	Margin of victory	Runner-up
1	16 Jul 2020	Stoneham	−7 (65)	Playoff	(England) Richard Bland

== Results in major championships ==
Results not in chronological order in 2020.

Tournament	2015	2016	2017	2018
Masters Tournament		CUT	T48	
U.S. Open	CUT	T23		
The Open Championship	T30	T12	T70	CUT
PGA Championship	CUT	T49	CUT	CUT

Tournament	2019	2020	2021	2022	2023	2024	2025	2026
Masters Tournament								
PGA Championship			CUT					CUT
U.S. Open		CUT						
The Open Championship	CUT	NT	T26					T69

Did not play

CUT = missed the half-way cut
"T" = tied
NT = no tournament due to COVID-19 pandemic

=== Summary ===
Tournament	Wins	2nd	3rd	Top-5	Top-10	Top-25	Events	Cuts made
Masters Tournament	0	0	0	0	0	0	2	1
PGA Championship	0	0	0	0	0	0	6	1
U.S. Open	0	0	0	0	0	1	3	1
The Open Championship	0	0	0	0	0	1	7	5
Totals	0	0	0	0	0	2	18	8

- Most consecutive cuts made – 5 (2016 U.S. Open – 2017 Open Championship)
- Longest streak of top-10s – 0

== Results in The Players Championship ==
Tournament	2016
The Players Championship	CUT

CUT = missed the halfway cut

== Results in World Golf Championships ==
Tournament	2015	2016	2017	2018	2019	2020	2021
Championship		T17	T20				T68
Match Play	T34	T18	T58			NT^{1}	T42
Invitational			T50				
Champions	T64			T62		NT^{1}	NT^{1}

^{1}Cancelled due to COVID-19 pandemic

Did not play

NT = No tournament
"T" = Tied

== Team appearances ==
Amateur

- Walker Cup (representing Great Britain and Ireland): 2011 (winners)
- European Amateur Team Championship (representing England): 2011

Professional

- EurAsia Cup (representing Europe): 2016 (winners)
- Ryder Cup (representing Europe): 2016
- World Cup (representing England): 2016

== See also ==
- 2011 European Tour Qualifying School graduates
- 2012 European Tour Qualifying School graduates
- 2026 Race to Dubai dual card winners
