= Rasmus Højgaard =

Danish professional golfer (born 2001)

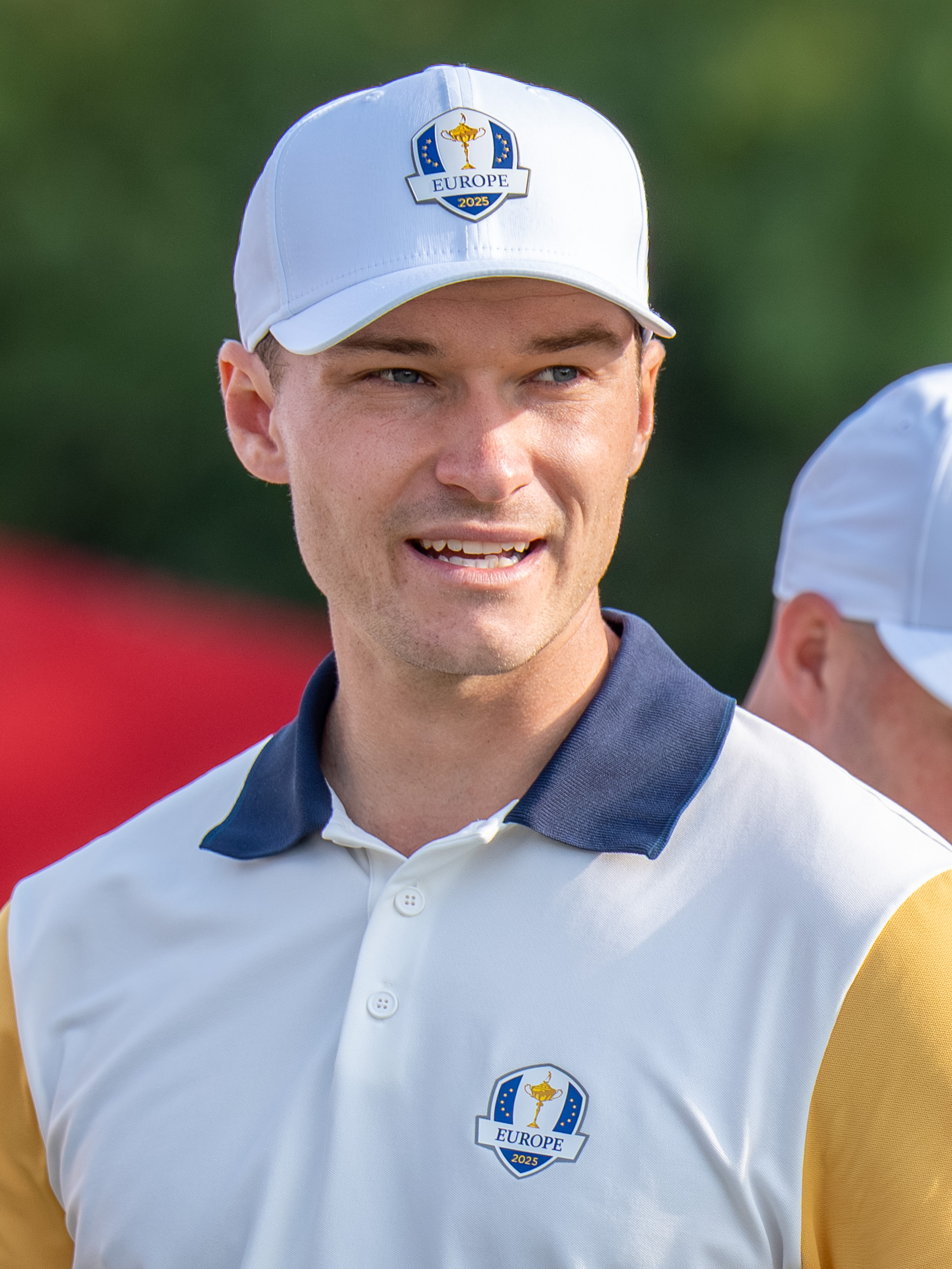
- Højgaard at the 2025 Ryder Cup

Personal information
- Nationality: Denmark
- Born: 12 March 2001 (age 25) Billund, Denmark

Career
- Sport: Golf
- Turned professional: 2019
- Current tours: European Tour; PGA Tour
- Former tour: Challenge Tour
- Professional wins: 5
- Highest ranking: 37 (29 December 2024) (as of 25 October 2026)

Number of wins by tour
- European Tour: 5
- Asian Tour: 1
- Sunshine Tour: 1

Best results in major championships
- Masters Tournament: T32: 2025
- PGA Championship: T65: 2026
- U.S. Open: T46: 2025
- The Open Championship: T16: 2025

Achievements and awards
- European Tour UK Swing Order of Merit winner: 2020

Rasmus Højgaard (born 12 March 2001) is a Danish professional golfer who currently plays on the PGA Tour and European Tour. In 2021, he and his twin brother, Nicolai, became the first brothers to win in back-to-back weeks on the European Tour. He also was part of the winning European 2025 Ryder Cup team, just like his twin brother had been two years earlier.

== Amateur career ==
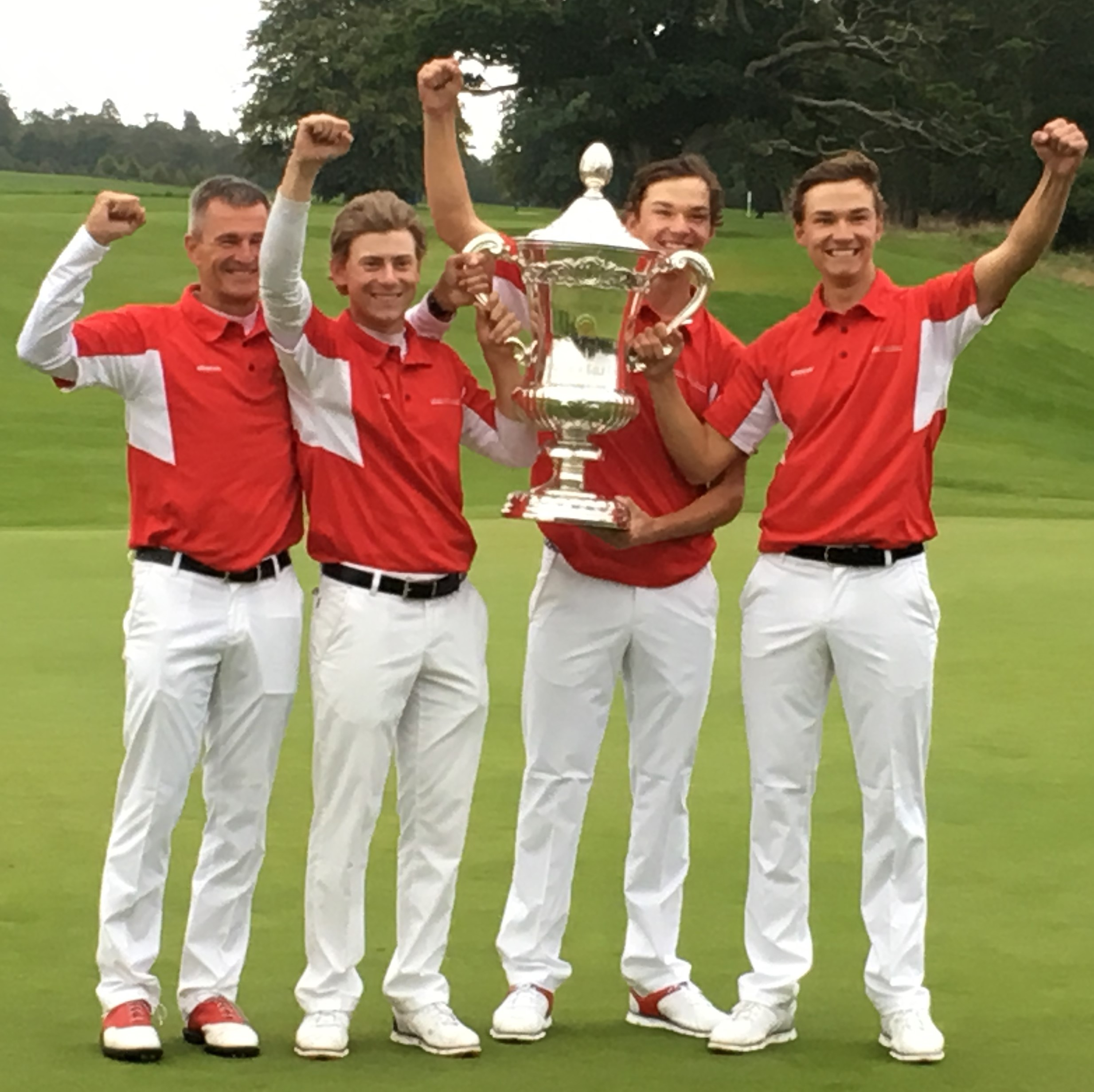
2018 Eisenhower Trophy in Ireland. The winning Danish team: Torben Nyehuus (captain), John Axelsen, Nicolai and Rasmus Højgaard

Højgaard first came to prominence in July 2016 when he won the Danish International Amateur Championship, was part of the Danish team that finished third in the European Boys' Team Championship and won the McGregor Trophy in successive weeks. In 2017 Højgaard received further recognition at the boys level by representing Continental Europe in the Jacques Léglise Trophy. He was also part of the Danish team that won the 2017 European Boys Team Championship, beating the hosts Spain in the final.

Early in 2018 Højgaard played for Europe in the Bonallack Trophy against Asia/Pacific. In June he won the individual competition for the boys Toyota Junior Golf World Cup, four strokes ahead of his brother Nicolai. Denmark also won the team competition. In September he was part of the Danish team that won the 2018 Eisenhower Trophy for the first time and he played for Europe in the Junior Ryder Cup later in the month.

== Professional career ==
Højgaard turned professional at the start of 2019. After playing some tournaments on the Nordic Golf League he played on the Challenge Tour for the rest of the season. He was one of five runners-up in his first Challenge Tour event, the Challenge de España. Although he had a number of further top-10 finishes, he finished 21st in the Order of Merit, missing out on a place on the 2020 European Tour. However he finished tied for 5th place in the Q School later in 2019 to gain a place on the tour.

In December 2019, Højgaard won the AfrAsia Bank Mauritius Open, the second event of the season, winning a three-man playoff against Renato Paratore and Antoine Rozner at the third extra hole.

Højgaard was the first player born in the 2000s to win on the European Tour. He won in only his fifth European Tour start and became the third youngest winner in Tour history (18 years, 271 days), behind Matteo Manassero (17 years, 188 days) and Danny Lee (18 years, 213 days).

In August 2020, Højgaard won the ISPS Handa UK Championship in a playoff over Justin Walters for his second European Tour win. He became the second youngest player to achieve multiple wins on the Tour, after Matteo Manassero. He also claimed the UK Swing Order of Merit, a mini order of merit awarded during the six events played in the UK during the European Tour's return to golf after the COVID-19 pandemic in 2020.

In August 2021, Højgaard won the Omega European Masters in Switzerland. He shot a final-round 63 to post −13 and the clubhouse lead. Bernd Wiesberger who was leading by one shot at the time, double-bogeyed the final hole to finish one behind Højgaard.

In July 2023, Højgaard won the Made in HimmerLand event in Denmark. He shot a final-round 64 and beat Nacho Elvira in a six-hole sudden-death playoff.

In September 2024, Højgaard won the Amgen Irish Open for his fifth European Tour victory. Højgaard became the youngest player since José María Olazábal in 1989 to collect five wins on the European Tour.

== Personal life ==
Højgaard's twin brother Nicolai is a professional golfer and was also part of the Danish team that won the 2018 Eisenhower Trophy. They became the first brothers to win in back-to-back weeks on the European Tour in 2021.

== Amateur wins ==
- 2015 Aon Junior Tour Drenge 1
- 2016 Danish International Amateur Championship, McGregor Trophy, DGU Elite Tour III Drenge
- 2017 Hovborg Kro Open, KGC Masters
- 2018 Toyota Junior Golf World Cup

== Professional wins (5) ==
=== European Tour wins (5) ===
| No. | Date | Tournament | Winning score | Margin of victory | Runner(s)-up |
|---|---|---|---|---|---|
| 1 | 8 Dec 2019 (2020 season) | AfrAsia Bank Mauritius Open^{1} | −19 (66-69-66-68=269) | Playoff | (Italy) Renato Paratore, (France) Antoine Rozner |
| 2 | 30 Aug 2020 | ISPS Handa UK Championship | −14 (73-69-67-65=274) | Playoff | (South Africa) Justin Walters |
| 3 | 29 Aug 2021 | Omega European Masters | −13 (68-66-70-63=267) | 1 stroke | (Austria) Bernd Wiesberger |
| 4 | 9 Jul 2023 | Made in HimmerLand | −13 (68-70-65-64=267) | Playoff | (Spain) Nacho Elvira |
| 5 | 15 Sep 2024 | Amgen Irish Open | −9 (71-68-71-65=275) | 1 stroke | (Northern Ireland) Rory McIlroy |

^{1}Co-sanctioned by the Asian Tour and the Sunshine Tour

European Tour playoff record (3–0)

| No. | Year | Tournament | Opponent(s) | Result |
|---|---|---|---|---|
| 1 | 2019 | AfrAsia Bank Mauritius Open | (Italy) Renato Paratore, (France) Antoine Rozner | Won with eagle on third extra hole Paratore eliminated by birdie on first hole |
| 2 | 2020 | ISPS Handa UK Championship | (South Africa) Justin Walters | Won with par on second extra hole |
| 3 | 2023 | Made in HimmerLand | (Spain) Nacho Elvira | Won with par on sixth extra hole |

== Results in major championships ==
Results not in chronological order in 2020.

| Tournament | 2020 | 2021 | 2022 | 2023 | 2024 | 2025 | 2026 |
|---|---|---|---|---|---|---|---|
| Masters Tournament | | | | | | T32 | 53 |
| PGA Championship | | 79 | | CUT | T68 | T67 | T65 |
| U.S. Open | CUT | | | | | T46 | |
| The Open Championship | NT | | | CUT | T60 | T16 | CUT |

Did not play

CUT = missed the half-way cut
"T" = tied
NT = no tournament due to COVID-19 pandemic

=== Summary ===
| Tournament | Wins | 2nd | 3rd | Top-5 | Top-10 | Top-25 | Events | Cuts made |
|---|---|---|---|---|---|---|---|---|
| Masters Tournament | 0 | 0 | 0 | 0 | 0 | 0 | 2 | 2 |
| PGA Championship | 0 | 0 | 0 | 0 | 0 | 0 | 5 | 4 |
| U.S. Open | 0 | 0 | 0 | 0 | 0 | 0 | 2 | 1 |
| The Open Championship | 0 | 0 | 0 | 0 | 0 | 1 | 4 | 2 |
| Totals | 0 | 0 | 0 | 0 | 0 | 1 | 13 | 9 |

- Most consecutive cuts made – 8 (2024 PGA Championship – 2026 PGA Championship)
- Longest streak of top-10s – none

== Results in The Players Championship ==
| Tournament | 2025 | 2026 |
|---|---|---|
| The Players Championship | CUT | CUT |

CUT = missed the half-way cut

== Results in World Golf Championships ==
| Tournament | 2021 |
|---|---|
| Championship | 67 |
| Match Play | |
| Invitational | |
| Champions | NT^{1} |

^{1}Cancelled due to COVID-19 pandemic

Did not play

NT = No tournament

== Team appearances ==
Amateur

- European Boys' Team Championship (representing Denmark): 2016, 2017 (winners)
- Jacques Léglise Trophy (representing the Continent of Europe): 2017 (winners)
- Bonallack Trophy (representing Europe): 2018
- European Amateur Team Championship (representing Denmark): 2018
- Junior Ryder Cup (representing Europe): 2018
- Eisenhower Trophy (representing Denmark): 2018 (winners)

Professional

- Team Cup (representing Continental Europe): 2025
- Ryder Cup (representing Europe): 2025 (winners)

== See also ==
- 2019 European Tour Qualifying School graduates
- 2024 Race to Dubai dual card winners
