= English Championship (golf) =

Coordinates: 51.828°N 0.040°W

Tournament information
- Location: Ware, Hertfordshire, England
- Established: 2020
- Course: Hanbury Manor
- Par: 71
- Length: 7,013 yards (6,413 m)
- Tour: European Tour
- Format: Stroke play
- Prize fund: €1,000,000
- Month played: August
- Final year: 2020

Tournament record score
- Aggregate: 257 Andy Sullivan (2020)
- To par: −27 as above

Final champion
- (England) Andy Sullivan

Location map
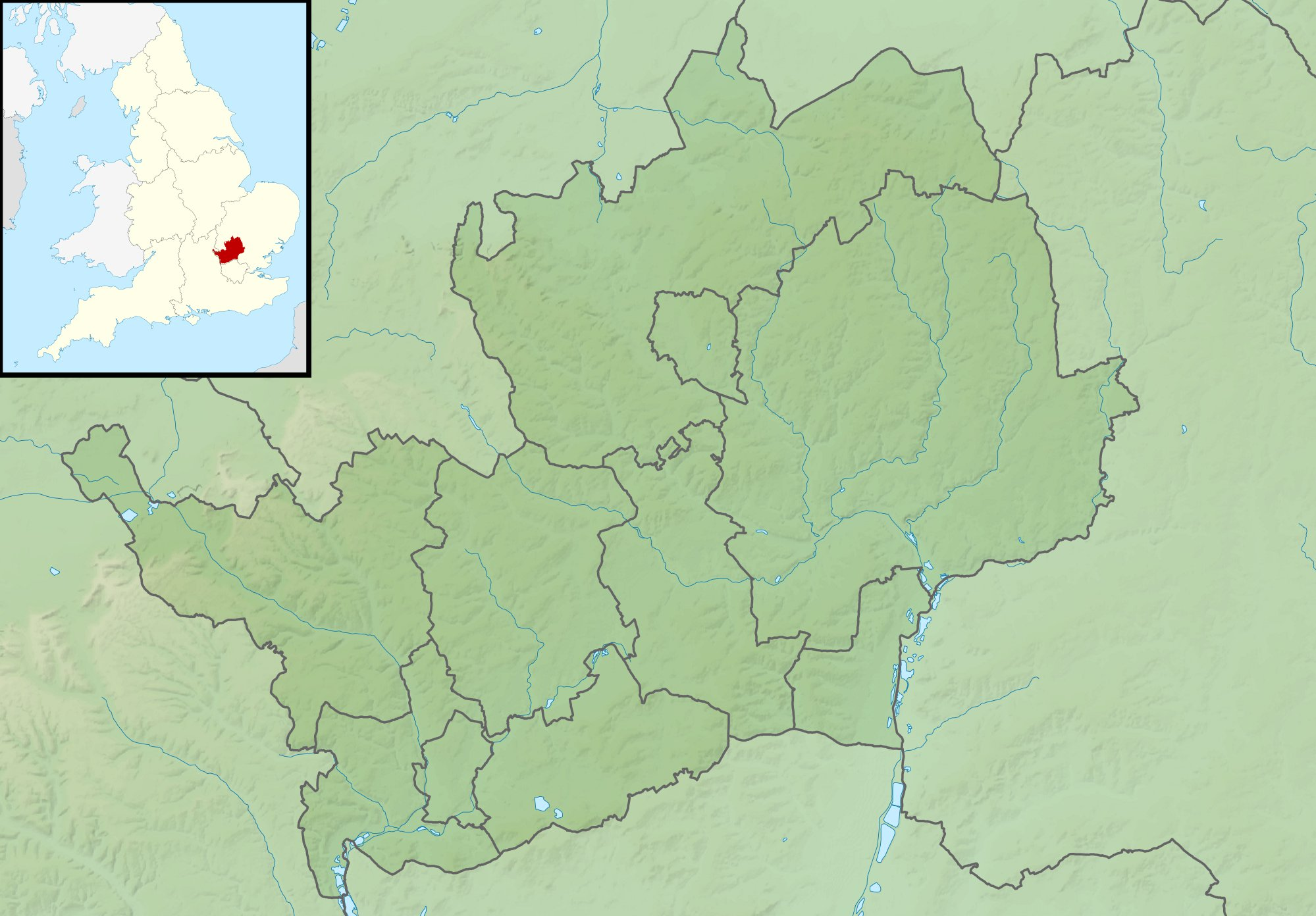
- Location in England Location in Hertfordshire

The English Championship was a professional golf tournament held 6–9 August 2020 at Hanbury Manor Golf Club in Thundridge, near Ware, Hertfordshire, England.

The tournament was intended to be a one-off event and was the third leg of a six-week "UK swing" on the European Tour during the 2020 season. The UK swing was created as part of sweeping changes to the tour's schedule due to the COVID-19 pandemic. Prior to the tournament, American John Catlin became the first player to be withdrawn from a tournament due to violating the tour's health measures.

Andy Sullivan won the tournament and achieved a new European Tour scoring record at the time, with an aggregate of 257 over 72 holes, beating the old record of 258, shared by David Llewellyn and Ian Woosnam, who achieved their records in 1988 and 1990 respectively. This record has since been beaten by Garrick Higgo, who shot an aggregate score of 255 in 2021.

== Winners ==
Year	Winner	Score	To par	Margin of victory	Runner-up
2020	(England) Andy Sullivan	257	−27	7 strokes	(Spain) Adrián Otaegui
