= Sam Horsfield =

English golfer (born 1996)

Personal information
- Nationality: England
- Born: 8 October 1996 (age 30) Manchester, England

Career
- Sport: Golf
- College: University of Florida
- Turned professional: 2017
- Current tours: European Tour; LIV Golf
- Professional wins: 3
- Highest ranking: 64 (15 May 2022) (as of 25 October 2026)

Number of wins by tour
- European Tour: 3

Best results in major championships
- Masters Tournament: DNP
- PGA Championship: T49: 2021
- U.S. Open: CUT: 2015, 2016, 2019, 2022
- The Open Championship: T67: 2021

Achievements and awards
- SEC Freshman of the Year: 2016

Sam Horsfield (born 8 October 1996) is an English professional golfer who plays on the European Tour.

== Amateur career ==
Horsfield has lived in the United States since he was five years old. In 2014, he won the Junior Players Championship and was semi-finalist at the U.S. Junior Amateur.

He attended the University of Florida for two years 2015–17. Playing with the Florida Gators men's golf team he recorded 4 individual victories, was named First Team All-American, SEC Freshman of the Year, and semi-finalist for the Ben Hogan Award and Jack Nicklaus Award.

Horsfield was selected for the 2015 Walker Cup at Royal Lytham & St Annes Golf Club but withdrew two weeks before the event. It was later reported that he thought he may not have had the correct visa and was worried he would not be allowed to return to the United States after the event. He was runner-up at the 2016 Western Amateur. Horsfield won the 2016 Arnold Palmer Cup with the European team and turned professional in May 2017.

== Professional career ==
Horsfield was the medalist at the 2017 European Tour Qualifying School to earn a place on the European Tour for 2018. He had a useful start to 2018, with a 4th place in the ISPS Handa World Super 6 Perth and finishing second at the Tshwane Open, two strokes behind George Coetzee. Later in the season he was tied for 5th place in the Sky Sports British Masters and finished 52nd in the Order of Merit.

In early August 2020, Horsfield had his breakthrough win on the European Tour when he won the Hero Open by one shot over Thomas Detry. Two weeks later, Horsfield won his second European Tour event at the Celtic Classic in Wales, two strokes ahead of Detry, who finished as runner-up again.

In May 2022, Horsfield picked up his third European Tour victory at the Soudal Open in Belgium.

Horsfield was part of the inaugural LIV Golf event at Centurion Club at London, where he placed 5th, winning $975,000. He collected a total of $3.5 million in individual prize money across the 2022 and 2023 LIV seasons, despite missing most of the 2023 season due to hip surgery.

== Amateur wins ==
- 2013 Florida Amateur
- 2014 New Year's Invitational, Junior Players Championship
- 2015 New Year's Invitational
- 2016 Sea Best Invitational, Southern Highlands Collegiate, Mason Rudolph Championship
- 2017 Mason Rudolph Championship

== Professional wins (3) ==
=== European Tour wins (3) ===
No.	Date	Tournament	Winning score	Margin of victory	Runner(s)-up
1	2 Aug 2020	Hero Open	−18 (68-63-71-68=270)	1 stroke	(Belgium) Thomas Detry
2	16 Aug 2020	Celtic Classic	−18 (67-64-68-67=266)	2 strokes	(Belgium) Thomas Detry
3	15 May 2022	Soudal Open	−13 (65-69-69-68=271)	2 strokes	(New Zealand) Ryan Fox, (Germany) Yannik Paul

== Results in major championships ==
Results not in chronological order in 2020.

Tournament	2015	2016	2017	2018
Masters Tournament				
U.S. Open	CUT	CUT		
The Open Championship				
PGA Championship				

Tournament	2019	2020	2021	2022	2023	2024
Masters Tournament						
PGA Championship			T49	CUT		
U.S. Open	CUT			CUT		
The Open Championship		NT	T67	CUT		CUT

Did not play

CUT = missed the halfway cut
NT = no tournament due to COVID-19 pandemic

== Team appearances ==
Amateur

- Palmer Cup (representing Europe): 2016 (winners)

== See also ==
- 2017 European Tour Qualifying School graduates
