= Andrew Chandler (golfer) =

English professional golfer, sports agent (born 1953)

Personal information
- Full name: Andrew Haydn Chandler
- Nickname: Chubby
- Nationality: England
- Born: April 1953 (age 73) Bolton, Lancashire, England

Career
- Sport: Golf
- Turned professional: 1974
- Former tour: European Tour
- Professional wins: 1

Best results in major championships
- Masters Tournament: DNP
- PGA Championship: DNP
- U.S. Open: DNP
- The Open Championship: T65: 1986

Andrew Haydn "Chubby" Chandler (born 1953) is an English retired professional golfer (European Tour) and current managing director of the Cheshire-based sports management firm International Sports Management (ISM).

== Early life ==
Chandler is of Turkish descent. As an amateur, he won the British Youths Open Amateur Championship in 1972.

== Professional career ==
In 1974, Chandler turned professional. His first European Tour tournament was that year's Italian Open, which was also the tour debut of Seve Ballesteros. He spent the following 15 years playing on the Tour, with his best season in 1986 when he finished 44th on the Order of Merit; he also had his best result in that season with a third place in the Italian Open. Despite never winning on Tour, he did have one professional victory, at the 1985 São Paulo International. However, after another slump in form, he retired from the professional game in 1989.

After retirement from his playing career in 1989, Chandler decided to start a sports management business. He approached fellow professional golfers Derrick Cooper, Denis Durnian, Phil Harrison and Carl Mason, and agreed a deal to manage their careers, operating with an initial £10,000 overdraft from a back room at Mere Golf Club. Soon after, in 1990, Chandler was approached by the young amateur player Darren Clarke, who went on to become one of his most successful players.

=== Management career ===
The golf management business steadily grew throughout the 1990s, until Chandler was approached by the Lancashire player Neil Fairbrother to manage the career of his young teammate, Andrew Flintoff. Flintoff went on to propel Chandler and his company into the spotlight during the 2005 Ashes series, while Fairbrother took a post at ISM himself after retiring from cricket in 2002 before setting up Phoenix Management in 2018. The increasing success of ISM, and particularly the original golf sector, became apparent in 2010 and 2011; after the victory of longtime client Darren Clarke at the 2011 Open Championship, ISM had represented four of the previous five major championship winners, namely Louis Oosthuizen, Charl Schwartzel, Rory McIlroy and Clarke himself.

McIlroy left ISM in the autumn of 2011, later saying that ISM took his career in the wrong direction. McIlroy regretted his decision in 2010 to give up his PGA Tour card, and to skip the 2010 Players Championship at Sawgrass that year. Chandler's aversion to the PGA Tour was cited by McIlroy as one of the main reasons for their split.

== Professional wins ==
- 1985 São Paulo International

== Results in major championships ==
Tournament	1975	1976	1977	1978	1979	1980	1981	1982	1983	1984	1985	1986	1987	1988
The Open Championship	CUT		CUT	CUT			CUT			CUT		T65		CUT

Note: Chandler only played in The Open Championship.

Did not play

CUT = missed the half-way cut
"T" = tied
