= Callum Shinkwin =

English golfer (born 1993)

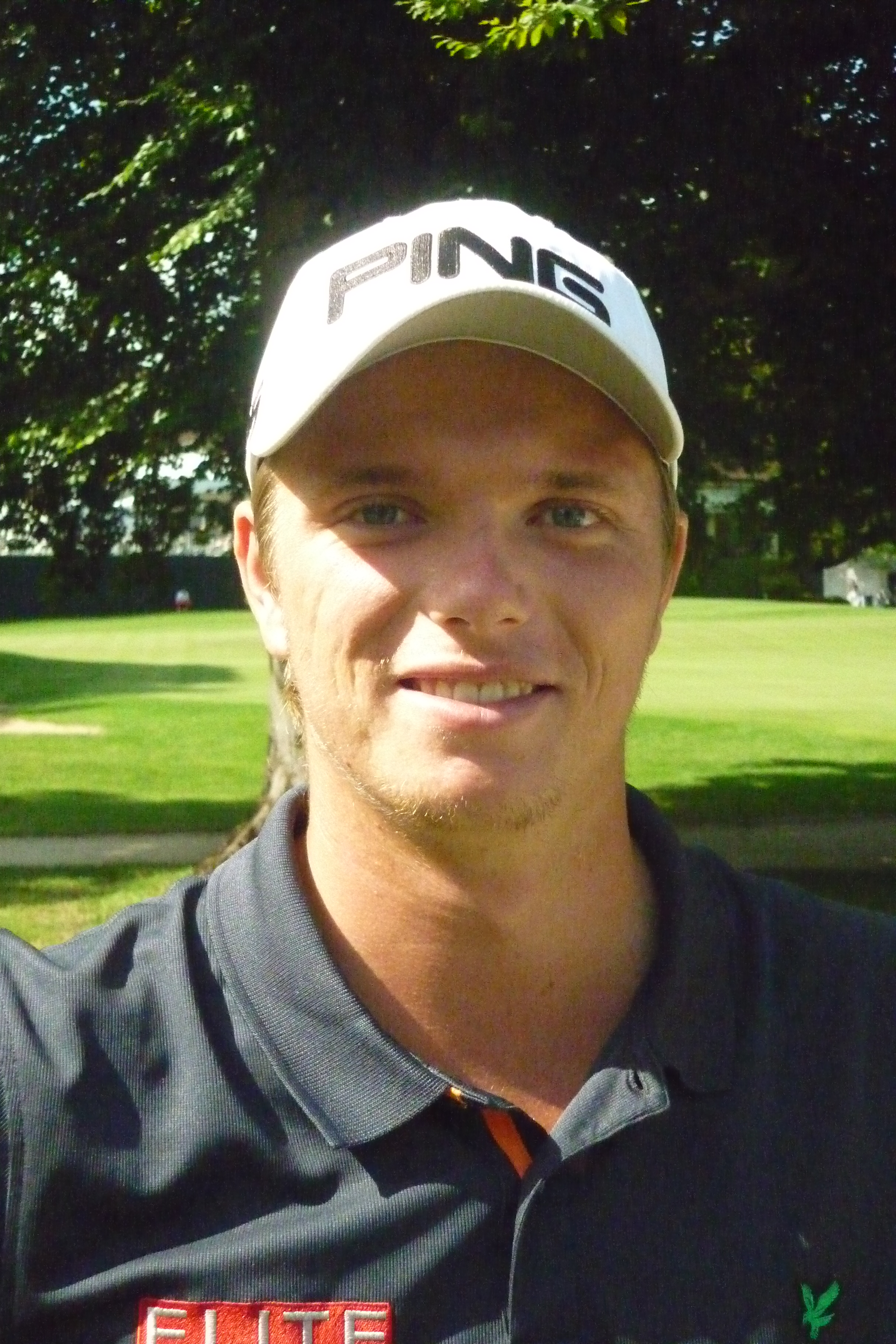

Personal information
- Full name: Callum Ronald Shinkwin
- Nationality: England
- Born: 22 May 1993 (age 33) Watford, Hertfordshire, England
- Height: 1.80 m (5 ft 11 in)
- Weight: 80 kg (180 lb; 13 st)

Career
- Sport: Golf
- Turned professional: 2013
- Current tour: European Tour
- Former tour: Challenge Tour
- Professional wins: 2
- Highest ranking: 83 (29 January 2023) (as of 25 October 2026)

Number of wins by tour
- European Tour: 2

Best results in major championships
- Masters Tournament: DNP
- PGA Championship: CUT: 2023
- U.S. Open: DNP
- The Open Championship: T41: 2019

Callum Ronald Shinkwin (born 22 May 1993) is an English professional golfer who plays on the European Tour.

== Amateur career ==
Shinkwin was a successful amateur golfer. In 2010 he won the Carris Trophy, the English Boys' under-18 open amateur stroke play championship, at Woodhall Spa. In 2013 he won the English Amateur, beating Matt Fitzpatrick 4&3 in the final at Frilford Heath Golf Club, leading to his selection for the Walker Cup team the same year.

== Professional career ==
Shinkwin turned professional in November 2013 and played on the 2014 Challenge Tour, coming second in the Challenge de Catalunya and finishing 34th in the Challenge Tour Road to Oman. He played on the Challenge Tour again in 2015. A good finish to season, with a third place in the season-ending NBO Golf Classic Grand Final, lifted him to 13th in the Road to Oman rankings and gave him his European Tour card for 2016.

He earned his biggest prize to date by finishing tied for 19th in the Irish Open in May 2016 and then bettered that by finishing tied for 9th in the Open de France, after a final-round 68. The following week he finished tied for 8th in the Scottish Open after a last-round 65, coming back in 30. His performance in the Open de France gave him entry to the 2016 Open Championship, his first major championship, where he missed the cut.

Although he finished tied for 23rd in his first appearance of 2017, he then failed to make the cut in his next nine tournaments. He showed a return to form in the same events where he had some success in 2016, making the cut in the Open de France before a disappointing last round 81 and followed this with a tie for 30th place in Irish Open. The following week, in the Aberdeen Asset Management Scottish Open, Shinkwin had a one-stroke lead playing the final hole but took a bogey 6 and lost to Rafa Cabrera-Bello at the first playoff hole. The result gave him an entry into the Open Championship for the second successive year.

In November 2020, Shinkwin won the Aphrodite Hills Cyprus Open by defeating Kalle Samooja in a playoff to claim his first European Tour title.

In August 2022, Shinkwin won his second European Tour event at the Cazoo Open at the Celtic Manor Resort in Wales. He won by four shots ahead of Connor Syme.

== Amateur wins ==
- 2010 Carris Trophy
- 2013 South American Amateur, Hampshire Salver, English Amateur

== Professional wins (2) ==
=== European Tour wins (2) ===
No.	Date	Tournament	Winning score	Margin of victory	Runner-up
1	1 Nov 2020	Aphrodite Hills Cyprus Open	−20 (67-66-68-63=264)	Playoff	(Finland) Kalle Samooja
2	7 Aug 2022	Cazoo Open	−12 (69-68-65-70=272)	4 strokes	(Scotland) Connor Syme

European Tour playoff record (1–1)

No.	Year	Tournament	Opponent	Result
1	2017	Aberdeen Asset Management Scottish Open	(Spain) Rafa Cabrera-Bello	Lost to birdie on first extra hole
2	2020	Aphrodite Hills Cyprus Open	(Finland) Kalle Samooja	Won with birdie on first extra hole

== Results in major championships ==
Tournament	2016	2017	2018
Masters Tournament			
U.S. Open			
The Open Championship	CUT	CUT	
PGA Championship			

Tournament	2019	2020	2021	2022	2023
Masters Tournament					
PGA Championship					CUT
U.S. Open					
The Open Championship	T41	NT			CUT

Did not play

CUT = missed the half-way cut
"T" = tied
NT = No tournament due to COVID-19 pandemic

== Team appearances ==
Amateur

- Jacques Léglise Trophy (representing Great Britain and Ireland): 2011 (winners)
- European Amateur Team Championship (representing England): 2013 (winners)
- Walker Cup (representing Great Britain & Ireland): 2013

Professional

- European Championships (representing Great Britain): 2018
- Hero Cup (representing Great Britain & Ireland): 2023

== See also ==
- 2015 Challenge Tour graduates
