= International Sports Management =

Sports management agency based in Cheshire, England

International Sports Management Limited ("ISM") is a sports management agency based in Cheshire, England, that represents leading figures from golf. It was founded in 1989 by former European Tour golfer Andrew "Chubby" Chandler.

== Overview ==
Golf clients include 2011 Open champion and 2016 Ryder Cup captain Darren Clarke, Matt Wallace, George Coetzee and Justin Harding.

The agency is also an event promoter and has put on the Turkish Airlines World Golf Final, the Turkish Airlines Open, the British Masters and the Aphrodite Hills Cyprus Open and Aphrodite Hills Cyprus Showdown.
