= Justin Walters =

South African golfer (born 1980)

Personal information
- Full name: Justin Jeremy Walters
- Nationality: South Africa; England
- Born: 23 October 1980 (age 46) Johannesburg, South Africa
- Height: 1.83 m (6 ft 0 in)
- Weight: 95 kg (209 lb; 15.0 st)
- Children: 2

Career
- Sport: Golf
- College: Huntingdon College; North Carolina State University
- Turned professional: 2003
- Current tour: Sunshine Tour
- Former tours: European Tour; Challenge Tour; Tarheel Tour
- Professional wins: 4

Number of wins by tour
- Sunshine Tour: 3
- Other: 1

Best results in major championships
- Masters Tournament: DNP
- PGA Championship: DNP
- U.S. Open: T65: 2019
- The Open Championship: CUT: 2014, 2025

Achievements and awards
- European Tour Graduate of the Year: 2013

Justin Jeremy Walters (born 23 October 1980) is a South African professional golfer.

== Early life ==
Walters played college golf at Huntingdon College, winning the 2001 NAIA Championship. He then transferred to North Carolina State University where he won three times and was an All-American in 2002 and 2003.

His mother is English and has played for England in team play as an amateur in the Walker Cup.

== Professional career ==
In 2003, he turned professional. Walters plays on the Sunshine Tour where he has won twice, most recently at the 2011 Investec Royal Swazi Open. He began playing on the Challenge Tour in 2012.

Walters has finished runner-up four times on the European Tour; twice at the Portugal Masters in 2013 and 2019, as well as the Joburg Open in 2014. He also tied for the lead after 72 holes at the 2020 ISPS Handa UK Championship, but was defeated in a playoff by Rasmus Højgaard.

== Professional wins (4) ==
=== Sunshine Tour wins (3) ===
No.	Date	Tournament	Winning score	Margin of victory	Runner(s)-up
1	2 Apr 2004	Parmalat Classic	−11 (68-72-65=205)	2 strokes	(South Africa) Nicholas Lawrence
2	7 May 2011	Investec Royal Swazi Open	45 pts (17-15-2-11=45)	1 point	(South Africa) Divan van den Heever
3	22 May 2026	Sunbet Challenge (Sun Boardwalk)	−15 (65-64-72=201)	1 stroke	(South Africa) Jacques Blaauw, (South Africa) Daniel van Tonder

=== Tarheel Tour wins (1) ===
No.	Date	Tournament	Winning score	Margin of victory	Runner-up
1	11 Aug 2005	Statesville Open	−17 (67-65-67=199)	4 strokes	(United States) David Sanchez

== Playoff record ==
European Tour playoff record (0–1)

No.	Year	Tournament	Opponent	Result
1	2020	ISPS Handa UK Championship	(Denmark) Rasmus Højgaard	Lost to par on second extra hole

== Results in major championships ==
Tournament	2014	2015	2016	2017	2018
Masters Tournament					
U.S. Open					
The Open Championship	CUT				
PGA Championship					

Tournament	2019	2020	2021	2022	2023	2024	2025
Masters Tournament							
PGA Championship							
U.S. Open	T65						
The Open Championship							CUT

Did not play

CUT = missed the halfway cut
"T" = tied

== Team appearances ==
Amateur

- Palmer Cup (representing Great Britain & Ireland): 2002

== See also ==
- 2012 Challenge Tour graduates
- 2015 European Tour Qualifying School graduates
- 2017 European Tour Qualifying School graduates
