= Thomas Detry =

Belgian professional golfer (born 1993)

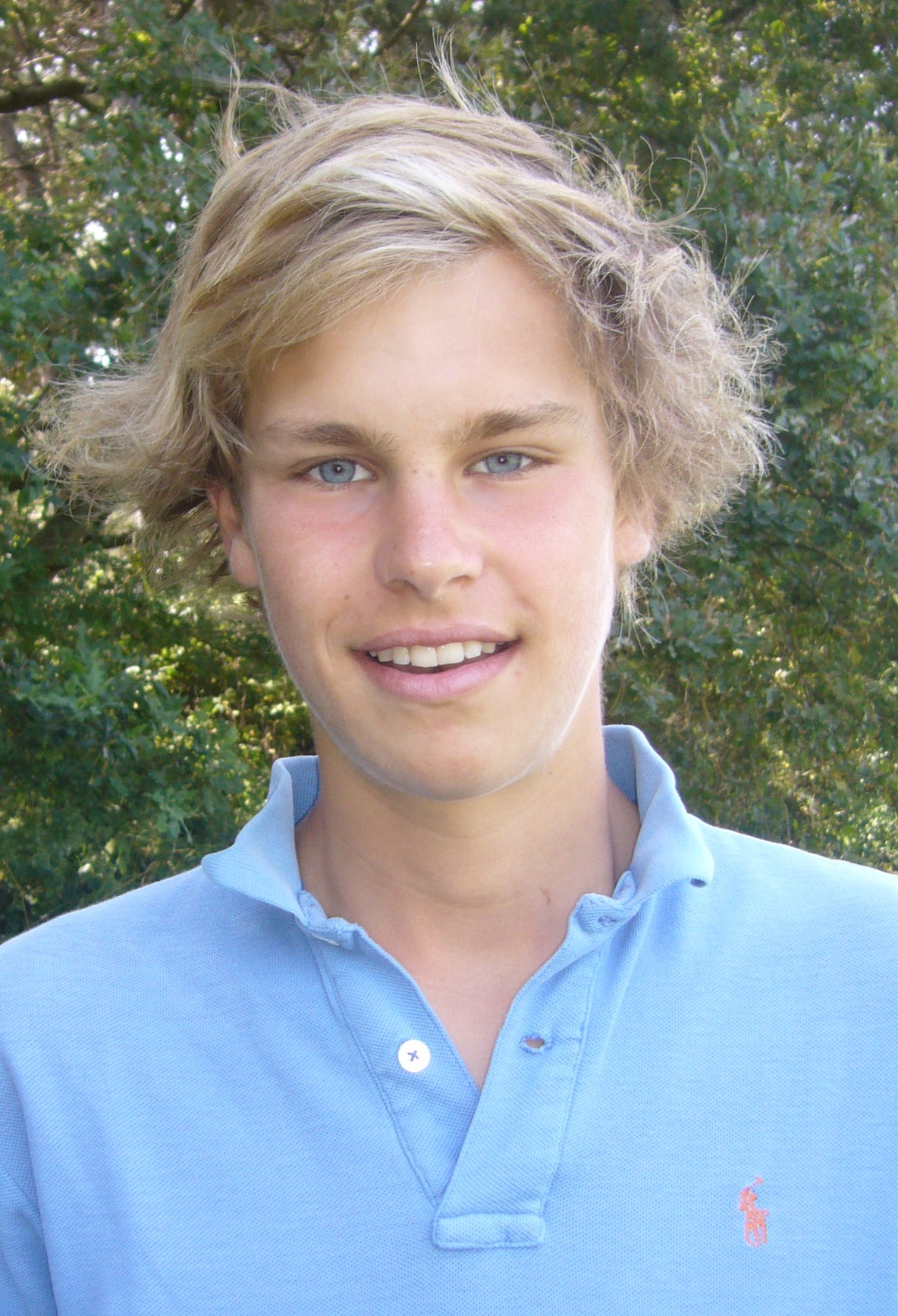
- Detry at the 2009 KLM Open

Personal information
- Nationality: Belgium
- Born: 13 January 1993 (age 33) Uccle, Belgium
- Height: 6 ft 2 in (188 cm)

Career
- Sport: Golf
- College: University of Illinois
- Turned professional: 2016
- Current tours: LIV Golf League; European Tour
- Former tours: PGA Tour; Challenge Tour
- Professional wins: 3
- Highest ranking: 22 (9 February 2025) (as of 25 October 2026)

Number of wins by tour
- PGA Tour: 1
- Challenge Tour: 1
- Other: 1

Best results in major championships
- Masters Tournament: CUT: 2025
- PGA Championship: T4: 2024
- U.S. Open: T14: 2024
- The Open Championship: T13: 2023

Thomas Detry (born 13 January 1993) is a Belgian professional golfer who plays on the European Tour and the LIV Golf League. He was a highly ranked amateur golfer before turning professional. In his first professional win at the Bridgestone Challenge, he set Challenge Tour records for largest margin of victory and tied for lowest score under-par with Ivó Giner. In 2025, he became the first Belgian to win on the PGA Tour when he won the WM Phoenix Open by seven shots.

== Early life ==
Detry was born in 1993 in Uccle, Belgium south of Brussels. He started playing golf when he was 5, but also played tennis and lawn hockey. He started competing in international golf tournaments when he was 13 years old. He studied at the Golf Flanders Topsportschool Vlaanderen in Hasselt until 2012. In 2009, when he was 16 years old, Detry won the Dutch Junior Open, a competition for young golfers aged under 21.

== Amateur career ==
After being part of the winning Belgian team at the 2010 European Boys' Team Championship at Klassis C&CC, Turkey, Detry was selected for the Junior Ryder Cup team (a competition between American and European youth) in 2010 and the Jacques Léglise Trophy team (pitting continental European boys against a team from the British Isles) in 2010 and 2011.

Detry represented Belgium at the Eisenhower Trophy three times, first time, in 2010, only 17 years old. He also represented Belgium at the European Amateur Team Championship and Europe in the Palmer Cup in 2014 and 2015.

Following fellow golfer and good friend Thomas Pieters, Detry studied business management at the University of Illinois from 2012 to 2016. He was named the Big Ten Freshman of the Year in 2013 and the Big Ten Golfer of the Year in 2015.

He was named the best Belgian amateur golfer in 2013 and 2015.

After winning the 2016 Big Ten Championship, he was ranked the 5th best amateur golfer in the world by the World Amateur Golf Ranking.

== Professional career ==
Detry turned professional in June 2016 and started competing on the Challenge Tour. He made the cut in his first 10 professional events, culminating in his win at the 2016 Bridgestone Challenge. With this win, he equaled the record for lowest under-par finish ever on the Challenge Tour (29 under par, set in 2003 by Ivó Giner), and set a new record for the win by the widest margin ever on the Challenge Tour – 12 strokes ahead of the second-place finisher. He also broke the course record at Heythrop Park Resort with his first round of 60 (12 under par).

On 24 November 2018, Detry won the 2018 World Cup of Golf with partner Thomas Pieters, representing Belgium, at Metropolitan Golf Club in Melbourne, Australia.

In August 2020, Detry twice finished solo runner-up at tournaments on the European Tour, at the Hero Open in Birmingham, England and at the Celtic Classic at the Celtic Manor Resort in Wales, both times beaten by Sam Horsfield, and advanced to 75th on the Official World Golf Ranking.

In February 2025, Detry became the first Belgian to win on the PGA Tour when he won the WM Phoenix Open. He won by seven shots ahead of Daniel Berger and Michael Kim.

== Amateur wins ==
- 2009 Riverwoods Junior Open
- 2010 Belgian National Juniors
- 2011 Grand Prix AFG, King's Prize, Belgium National Match Play
- 2012 Championnat de Ligue Amateur, Grand Prix AFG
- 2013 European Challenge Trophy (individual), Belgian International Amateur, Wolf Run Intercollegiate
- 2014 Sagamore Fall Preview
- 2015 Louisiana Classics, Boilermaker Invitational
- 2016 Big Ten Championship

== Professional wins (3) ==
=== PGA Tour wins (1) ===
No.	Date	Tournament	Winning score	Margin of victory	Runners-up
1	9 Feb 2025	WM Phoenix Open	−24 (66-64-65-65=260)	7 strokes	(United States) Daniel Berger, (United States) Michael Kim

=== Challenge Tour wins (1) ===
No.	Date	Tournament	Winning score	Margin of victory	Runner-up
1	28 Aug 2016	Bridgestone Challenge	−29 (60-67-69-63=259)	12 strokes	(South Africa) Thriston Lawrence

=== Other wins (1) ===
No.	Date	Tournament	Winning score	Margin of victory	Runners-up
1	25 Nov 2018	ISPS Handa Melbourne World Cup of Golf (with (Belgium) Thomas Pieters)	−23 (63-71-63-68=265)	3 strokes	Australia − Marc Leishman and Cameron Smith, Mexico − Abraham Ancer and Roberto Díaz

== Playoff record ==
European Tour playoff record (0–1)

No.	Year	Tournament	Opponents	Result
1	2021	Abrdn Scottish Open	(England) Matt Fitzpatrick, (Australia) Min Woo Lee	Lee won with birdie on first extra hole

== Results in major championships ==
Results not in chronological order in 2020.

Tournament	2020	2021	2022	2023	2024	2025	2026
Masters Tournament						CUT	
PGA Championship		CUT		T40	T4	CUT	CUT
U.S. Open	T49	CUT			T14	T23	
The Open Championship	NT	CUT	T34	T13		T45	T40

Did not play
Top 10

CUT = missed the half-way cut
"T" = tied
NT = no tournament due to COVID-19 pandemic

=== Summary ===
Tournament	Wins	2nd	3rd	Top-5	Top-10	Top-25	Events	Cuts made
Masters Tournament	0	0	0	0	0	0	1	0
PGA Championship	0	0	0	1	1	1	5	2
U.S. Open	0	0	0	0	0	2	4	3
The Open Championship	0	0	0	0	0	1	5	4
Totals	0	0	0	1	1	4	15	9

- Most consecutive cuts made – 5 (2022 Open Championship – 2024 U.S. Open)
- Longest streak of top-10s – 1

== Results in The Players Championship ==
Tournament	2023	2024	2025
The Players Championship	CUT	T62	CUT

CUT = missed the halfway cut
"T" indicates a tie for a place

== Results in World Golf Championships ==
Tournament	2021
Championship	T28
Match Play	
Invitational	
Champions	NT^{1}

^{1}Cancelled due to COVID-19 pandemic

Did not play

"T" = Tied
NT = No tournament

== Team appearances ==
Amateur

- European Boys' Team Championship (representing Belgium): 2007, 2008, 2009, 2010, 2011 (winners)
- Jacques Léglise Trophy (representing Continental Europe): 2010 (winners), 2011
- Junior Ryder Cup (representing Europe): 2010
- Eisenhower Trophy (representing Belgium): 2010, 2012, 2014
- European Amateur Team Championship (representing Belgium): 2014, 2015
- Bonallack Trophy (representing Europe): 2012 (winners)
- Palmer Cup (representing Europe): 2014 (winners), 2015

Professional

- World Cup (representing Belgium): 2018 (winners)
- Hero Cup (representing Continental Europe): 2023 (winners)

== See also ==
- 2016 Challenge Tour graduates
- 2022 Korn Ferry Tour Finals graduates
