= Portugal Masters =

Coordinates: 37.103°N 8.143°W

Tournament information
- Location: Vilamoura, Portugal
- Established: 2007
- Course: Dom Pedro Victoria Golf Course
- Par: 71
- Length: 7,191 yards (6,575 m)
- Tour: European Tour
- Format: Stroke play
- Prize fund: US$2,000,000
- Month played: October
- Final year: 2022

Tournament record score
- Aggregate: 254 Jordan Smith (2022)
- To par: −30 as above

Final champion
- (England) Jordan Smith
- Location in Portugal

The Portugal Masters was a European Tour men's professional golf tournament which was played for the first time in October 2007. It had a prize fund is US$2 million, making it one of the richest golf tournaments in Portugal. It was jointly staged by the European Tour and the Portuguese Tourist Board (ITP). The host course is the Arnold Palmer designed Dom Pedro Victoria Golf Course in Vilamoura.

== Winners ==
Year	Winner	Score	To par	Margin of victory	Runner(s)-up
2022	(England) Jordan Smith	254	−30	3 strokes	(Malaysia) Gavin Green
2021	(Belgium) Thomas Pieters	265	−19	2 strokes	(Denmark) Lucas Bjerregaard (Denmark) Nicolai Højgaard (France) Matthieu Pavon
2020	(South Africa) George Coetzee	268	−16	2 strokes	(England) Laurie Canter
2019	(England) Steven Brown	267	−17	1 stroke	(South Africa) Brandon Stone (South Africa) Justin Walters
2018	(England) Tom Lewis (2)	262	−22	3 strokes	(Australia) Lucas Herbert (England) Eddie Pepperell
2017	(Denmark) Lucas Bjerregaard	264	−20	4 strokes	(Scotland) Marc Warren
2016	(Republic of Ireland) Pádraig Harrington	261	−23	1 stroke	(England) Andy Sullivan
2015	(England) Andy Sullivan	261	−23	9 strokes	(England) Chris Wood
2014	(France) Alexander Lévy	124 (Note: Shortened to 36 holes due to rain.)	−18	3 strokes	(Belgium) Nicolas Colsaerts
2013	(England) David Lynn	266	−18	1 stroke	(South Africa) Justin Walters
2012	(Republic of Ireland) Shane Lowry	270	−14	1 stroke	(England) Ross Fisher
2011	(England) Tom Lewis	267	−21	2 strokes	(Spain) Rafa Cabrera-Bello
2010	(Australia) Richard Green	270	−18	2 strokes	(Spain) Gonzalo Fernández-Castaño (Sweden) Robert Karlsson (Netherlands) Joost Luiten (Italy) Francesco Molinari
2009	(England) Lee Westwood	265	−23	2 strokes	(Italy) Francesco Molinari
2008	(Spain) Álvaro Quirós	269	−19	3 strokes	(Scotland) Paul Lawrie
2007	(England) Steve Webster	263	−25	2 strokes	(Sweden) Robert Karlsson
