= Celtic Classic =

Coordinates: 51.603°N 2.933°W

Tournament information
- Location: Newport, Wales
- Established: 2020
- Courses: Celtic Manor Resort (Twenty-Ten Course)
- Par: 71
- Length: 7,354 yards (6,724 m)
- Tour: European Tour
- Format: Stroke play
- Prize fund: €1,000,000
- Month played: August
- Final year: 2020

Tournament record score
- Aggregate: 266 Sam Horsfield (2020)
- To par: −18 as above

Final champion
- (England) Sam Horsfield

Location map
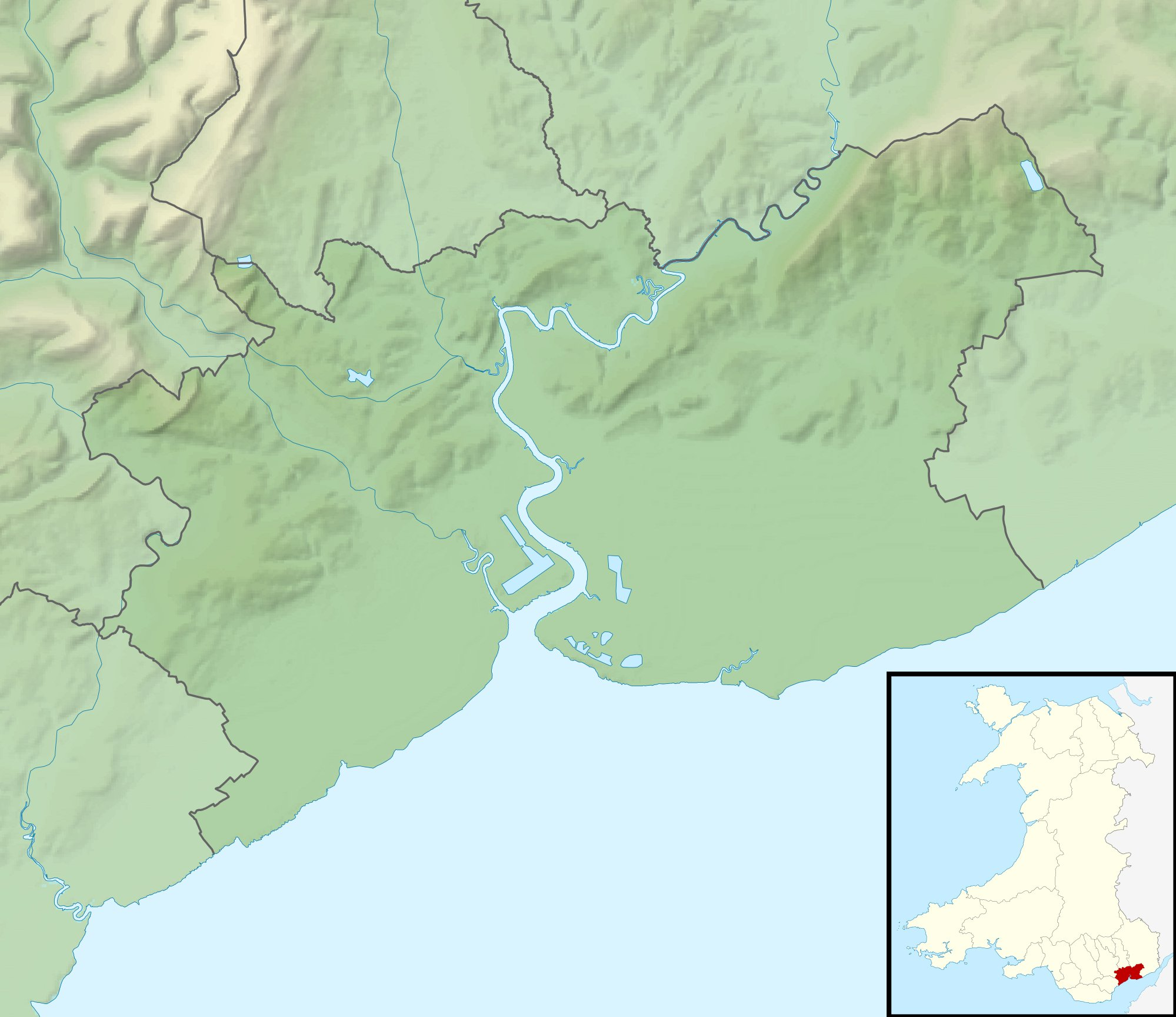
- Location in Wales Location in Newport

The Celtic Classic was a professional golf tournament held 13 to 16 August 2020 on the Twenty-Ten Course at the Celtic Manor Resort, in Newport, Wales.

The tournament was a one-off event and was the fourth leg of a six-week UK swing on the European Tour during the 2020 season. It was followed by a revival of the Wales Open at the same venue. The UK swing was created as part of sweeping changes to the tour's schedule due to the COVID-19 pandemic.

On the first day of the tournament it was announced that Alexander Lévy had become the first European Tour player to return a positive test for COVID-19. He and Romain Wattel, who had been in close contact with Lévy, were withdrawn from the field.

The winner was Sam Horsfield, who finished two strokes ahead of Thomas Detry to claim his second European Tour victory in the space of three weeks, having secured his maiden title at the Hero Open earlier in the month.

== Winners ==
Year	Winner	Score	To par	Margin of victory	Runner-up
2020	(England) Sam Horsfield	266	−18	2 strokes	(Belgium) Thomas Detry
