= UK Championship (golf) =

Golf tournament

Coordinates: 52.554°N 1.734°W

ISPS Handa UK Championship
Tournament information
- Location: Wishaw, Warwickshire, England
- Established: 2020
- Courses: The Belfry (Brabazon Course)
- Par: 72
- Length: 7,233 yards (6,614 m)
- Tour: European Tour
- Format: Stroke play
- Prize fund: €1,000,000
- Final year: 2020

Tournament record score
- Aggregate: 274 Rasmus Højgaard; 274 Justin Walters
- To par: −14 as above

Final champion
- (Denmark) Rasmus Højgaard

Location map
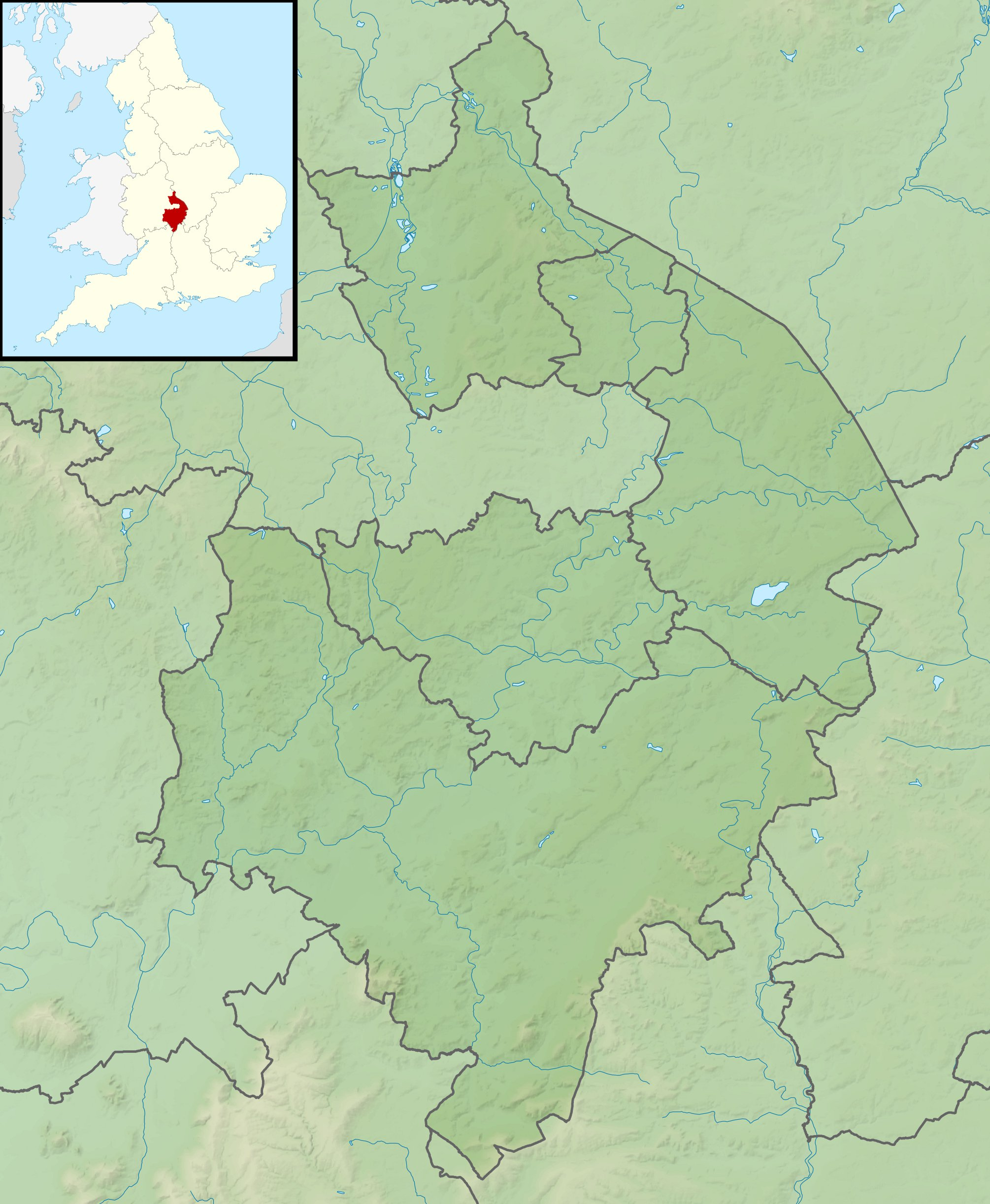
- Location in England Location in Warwickshire

The UK Championship, known as the ISPS Handa UK Championship for sponsorship reasons, was a professional golf tournament which was held 27–30 August 2020 at The Belfry, in Wishaw, Warwickshire, England.

The tournament was intended to be a one-off event and was the final leg of a six-week "UK swing" on the European Tour during the 2020 season. The UK swing was created as part of sweeping changes to the tour's schedule due to the COVID-19 pandemic.

Brendan Lawlor received a sponsor's invitation into the tournament and made history as he became the first disabled golfer to play in a European Tour event.

Rasmus Højgaard won the event, defeating Justin Walters in a playoff to claim his second European Tour win.

== Winners ==
Year	Winner	Score	To par	Margin of victory	Runner-up
2020	(Denmark) Rasmus Højgaard	274	−14	Playoff	(South Africa) Justin Walters
