= Cyprus Open =

Coordinates: 34.683°N 32.608°E

Aphrodite Hills Cyprus Open
Tournament information
- Location: Paphos, Cyprus
- Established: 2020
- Course: Aphrodite Hills Resort
- Par: 71
- Length: 6,956 yd (6,361 m)
- Tour: European Tour
- Format: Stroke play
- Prize fund: €1,000,000
- Month played: October/November
- Final year: 2020

Tournament record score
- Aggregate: 264 Kalle Samooja (2020); 264 Callum Shinkwin (2020)
- To par: −20 as above

Final champion
- (England) Callum Shinkwin

Location map
- Location in Cyprus

The Aphrodite Hills Cyprus Open was a professional golf tournament that was held from 29 October – 1 November 2020 at the Aphrodite Hills Resort, in Paphos, Cyprus.

The tournament, promoted by International Sports Management, was the first of two back-to-back Cyprus based events on the European Tour calendar during the 2020 season. It was the first time that the European Tour had hosted an event in Cyprus.

The event was scheduled to return in November 2022, however in August, it was cancelled.

== Winners ==
Year	Winner	Score	To par	Margin of victory	Runner-up
2022	Cancelled				
2021	No tournament				
2020	(England) Callum Shinkwin	264	−20	Playoff (Note: Shinkwin won with a birdie on the first hole of a sudden-death playoff.)	(Finland) Kalle Samooja

== See also ==
- Open golf tournament
