= 2020 European Tour =

Golf tour season

2020 European Tour season
- Duration: 28 November 2019 – 13 December 2020
- Number of official events: 38 (Note: A further 22 tournaments were scheduled but were either cancelled, postponed or otherwise removed from the schedule.)
- Most wins: (South Africa) Christiaan Bezuidenhout (2) (United States) John Catlin (2) (Denmark) Rasmus Højgaard (2) (England) Sam Horsfield (2)
- Race to Dubai: (England) Lee Westwood
- Golfer of the Year: (England) Lee Westwood
- Players' Player of the Year: (England) Lee Westwood
- Sir Henry Cotton Rookie of the Year: (Finland) Sami Välimäki
- Graduate of the Year: (France) Antoine Rozner
- UK Swing Order of Merit: (Denmark) Rasmus Højgaard

The 2020 European Tour was the 49th season of the European Tour, the main professional golf tour in Europe since its inaugural season in 1972.

== Planned changes for 2020 ==
=== Rule changes ===
In order to combat slow play, from the Abu Dhabi HSBC Championship onwards, regulations were introduced whereby a player would receive a one-stroke penalty for two bad times during a tournament.

=== Scheduling changes ===
With the addition of golf at the Olympic Games to the schedule in 2020, the Irish Open was moved to May from its previous date in July in order to avoid a clash with the WGC-FedEx St. Jude Invitational, which had already been moved to avoid the Olympics. The Open de France was then scheduled opposite the WGC Invitational, and the British Masters was scheduled opposite the Olympics.

=== Tournament changes ===
- Format change: the Scandinavian Invitation (formerly the Scandinavian Masters) became the Scandinavian Mixed, a co-sanctioned event with the Ladies European Tour consisting of a field of 78 men and 78 women.
- No longer part of the schedule: ISPS Handa World Super 6 Perth, Belgian Knockout

== COVID-19 pandemic impact ==
The COVID-19 pandemic had a major impact on the season, with many tournaments being rescheduled or cancelled. All four major championships were affected; The Open Championship was cancelled, and the Masters Tournament, U.S. Open and PGA Championship were moved to dates much later in the year.

After a three-month hiatus following the Commercial Bank Qatar Masters in early March, the tour resumed with a much changed schedule in July. Two dual-ranking events in Austria were followed by a six-tournament stretch in the United Kingdom and three tournaments in Spain and Portugal, with the rescheduled major events starting in late September.

On 13 August, it was announced that Alexander Lévy had become the first European Tour player to return a positive test for COVID-19. He and Romain Wattel, who had been in close contact with Lévy, were withdrawn from the field for the Celtic Classic.

=== In-season changes ===
Due to the 2019–20 Hong Kong protests, the Honma Hong Kong Open, originally scheduled for 28 November – 1 December 2019 as a co-sanctioned event with the Asian Tour, was rescheduled for 9–12 January 2020 as an Asian Tour event without European Tour sanctioning.

The COVID-19 pandemic severely impacted the remainder of the schedule.

- On 14 February, the Maybank Championship in Malaysia and the Volvo China Open were postponed. Sponsors subsequently confirmed that the Maybank Championship had been cancelled.
- On 6 March, the Magical Kenya Open was postponed.
- On 11 March, the Hero Indian Open was postponed, and the D+D Real Czech Masters was cancelled.
- On 13 March, the WGC-Dell Technologies Match Play was cancelled.
- On 17 March, the Estrella Damm N.A. Andalucía Masters was postponed.
- On 19 March, the GolfSixes Cascais was cancelled and the Made in Denmark was postponed. Organisers subsequently confirmed that the Made in Denmark had been cancelled.
- On 30 March, the Dubai Duty Free Irish Open was postponed.
- On 6 April, the Trophée Hassan II was postponed and the inaugural version of the Scandinavian Mixed was cancelled. The R&A also announced the cancellation of The Open Championship in 2020 and the seasons other major championships were rescheduled.
- On 16 April, the PGA Tour announced the rescheduling of several tournaments, including the WGC-FedEx St. Jude Invitational.
- On 17 April, the BMW International Open and Open de France were cancelled, and the Aberdeen Standard Investments Scottish Open was postponed.
- On 1 May, the Omega European Masters was cancelled.
- On 28 May, the tour announced a revamp to the 2020 schedule including a 6-week "UK swing" in July and August; starting with the Betfred British Masters which was brought forward a week, finishing on 25 July. That would be followed by revivals of the English Open and the Wales Open, and three new tournaments: the English Championship, the Celtic Classic and the UK Championship. In addition to this, four Rolex Series events were given rescheduled dates, with the Aberdeen Standard Investments Scottish Open and the BMW PGA Championship being pushed back into October, with the Nedbank Golf Challenge and the season-ending DP World Tour Championship, Dubai being played in December. It was also announced that the Porsche European Open had been cancelled.
- On 15 June, it was announced that both the European Tour and the Challenge Tour would return on 9 July with two consecutive dual-ranking events in Austria: the Austrian Open and the Euram Bank Open.
- On 3 July, it was announced that the Hero Indian Open had been cancelled.
- On 7 July, organisers announced the cancellation of the KLM Open.
- On 8 July, new dates were announced for the postponed Estrella Damm N.A. Andalucía Masters. The Portugal Masters was also rescheduled, with both tournaments being held during September. Later in the day, it was announced that the 43rd Ryder Cup matches had been postponed until 2021.
- On 10 July, new dates in November were announced for the Magical Kenya Open, originally scheduled for March. The Challenge Tour's Open de Portugal was also added to the schedule as a dual-ranking event; held in September following the Portugal Masters. The addition created a three event "Iberian Swing" starting with the Estrella Damm N.A. Andalucía Masters.
- On 13 July, the cancellation of the Mutuactivos Open de España was announced after suitable dates could not be found in the revised schedule.
- On 27 July, the cancellation of the Alfred Dunhill Links Championship was announced, with organisers citing complexities of accommodating the European Tour's COVID-19 safety plan given the event's scale as an international pro-am and its traditional use of three separate venues.
- On 14 August, the Dubai Duty Free Irish Open was rescheduled to 24–27 September with a change of venue to Galgorm Castle in Northern Ireland and a reduced prize fund, which also meant the loss of its status as a Rolex Series event.
- On 17 August, it was announced that the previously rescheduled Aberdeen Standard Investments Scottish Open and the BMW PGA Championship had both been forward one week, such that they would directly follow the Dubai Duty Free Irish Open and create a second "UK swing".
- On 28 August, two Rolex Series events, the Turkish Airlines Open and the Nedbank Golf Challenge, were cancelled and a third, the Italian Open, was rescheduled and downgraded. Three new tournaments were also announced, to take place in mid to late October and early November: the Scottish Championship, extending the second UK Swing to four tournaments, and the Cyprus Open and the Cyprus Classic, the first tour events to be held in Cyprus. On 12 October, the Cyprus Classic was renamed as the Cyprus Showdown with a novel elimination-style format.
- On 1 September, the cancellation of the 2020 edition of the WGC-HSBC Champions due to the COVID-19 pandemic was announced.
- On 10 September, the Magical Kenya Open was cancelled; it had previously been postponed in March and rescheduled to November.
- On 16 September, it was announced that the Australian PGA Championship had been postponed, with the tournament provisionally rescheduled for February 2021. As such, it no longer formed part of the 2020 season schedule. On 16 October, it was announced that it had been cancelled.
- On 20 October, it was announced that the Joburg Open had been added to the calendar; scheduled for the week following the Masters Tournament, it was last held in 2017.
- On 21 October, the Alfred Dunhill Championship was added to the schedule also, creating a "South African Swing"; it was the second edition of the tournament during the 2020 season, the first having been held in November/December 2019.
- On 22 October, the three-week "South African Swing" was completed with the addition of the South African Open to the schedule; it was also the second edition of the tournament during the 2020 season, the first having been held in January.
- On 9 November, a final adjustment to the schedule was made. The Golf in Dubai Championship was added as the penultimate event of the 2020 schedule, preceding the season ending DP World Tour Championship, Dubai.

== Schedule ==
The following table lists official events during the 2020 season.

Date	Tournament	Host country	Purse	R2D points	Winner (Note: The number in brackets after each winner's name is the number of European Tour events they had won up to and including that tournament. This information is only shown for European Tour members.)	OWGR points	Other tours (Note: AFR − Sunshine Tour; ANZ − PGA Tour of Australasia; ASA − Asian Tour; CHA − Challenge Tour; LET − Ladies European Tour.)	Notes
~~1 Dec~~	Hong Kong Open	Hong Kong	–	–	Removed (Note: Postponed due to protest violence; rescheduled to January 2020 without European Tour co-sanctioning.)	–	ASA	
1 Dec	Alfred Dunhill Championship	South Africa	€1,500,000	2,750	(Spain) Pablo Larrazábal (5)	19	AFR	
8 Dec	AfrAsia Bank Mauritius Open	Mauritius	€1,000,000	2,000	(Denmark) Rasmus Højgaard (1)	17	AFR, ASA	
22 Dec	Australian PGA Championship	Australia	A$1,500,000	2,000	(Australia) Adam Scott (11)	20	ANZ	
12 Jan	South African Open	South Africa	R17,500,000	2,000	(South Africa) Branden Grace (9)	32	AFR (Note: Sunshine Tour flagship event)	
19 Jan	Abu Dhabi HSBC Championship	UAE	US$7,000,000	7,000	(England) Lee Westwood (25)	50		Rolex Series
26 Jan	Omega Dubai Desert Classic	UAE	US$3,250,000	4,250	(Australia) Lucas Herbert (1)	48		
2 Feb	Saudi International	Saudi Arabia	US$3,500,000	4,250	(Northern Ireland) Graeme McDowell (11)	48		
9 Feb	ISPS Handa Vic Open	Australia	A$1,600,000	2,000	(Australia) Min Woo Lee (1)	20	ANZ	
23 Feb	WGC-Mexico Championship	Mexico	US$10,500,000	9,000	(United States) Patrick Reed (3)	70		World Golf Championship
1 Mar	Oman Open	Oman	US$1,750,000	2,750	(Finland) Sami Välimäki (1)	24		
8 Mar	Commercial Bank Qatar Masters	Qatar	US$1,750,000	2,750	(Spain) Jorge Campillo (2)	24		
~~22 Mar~~	Hero Indian Open	India	–	–	Cancelled (Note: Initially postponed and then later cancelled due to the COVID-19 pandemic.)	–	ASA	
~~29 Mar~~	WGC-Dell Technologies Match Play	United States	–	–	Cancelled (Note: Cancelled due to the COVID-19 pandemic.)	–		World Golf Championship
~~19 Apr~~	Maybank Championship	Malaysia	–	–	Cancelled	–	ASA	
~~26 Apr~~	Volvo China Open	China	–	–	Postponed (Note: Originally postponed due to the COVID-19 pandemic before being rescheduled to December 2020 as a sole-sanctioned China Tour event.)	–	ASA	
~~24 May~~	Made in Denmark	Denmark	–	–	Cancelled	–		
~~7 Jun~~	Trophée Hassan II	Morocco	–	–	Cancelled	–		
~~14 Jun~~	Scandinavian Mixed	Sweden	–	–	Cancelled	–	LET	Mixed event (Note: Field of 78 men and 78 women playing from different sets of tees. Tour ranking and world ranking points based on finish among men's field only.)
~~28 Jun~~	BMW International Open	Germany	–	–	Cancelled	–		
~~5 Jul~~	Open de France	France	–	–	Cancelled	–		
12 Jul (Note: Tournament added to the schedule as part of changes due to the COVID-19 pandemic.)	Austrian Open	Austria	€500,000	1,000	(Scotland) Marc Warren (4)	18	CHA	
18 Jul	Euram Bank Open	Austria	€500,000	1,000	(France) Joël Stalter (1)	18	CHA	New to European Tour
~~19 Jul~~	The Open Championship	England	–	–	Cancelled	–		Major championship
25 Jul (Note: Rescheduled due to the COVID-19 pandemic.); ~~2 Aug~~	Betfred British Masters	England	€1,250,000	2,000	(Italy) Renato Paratore (2)	24		
2 Aug	Hero Open	England	€1,000,000	2,000	(England) Sam Horsfield (1)	24		New tournament
2 Aug; ~~5 Jul~~	WGC-FedEx St. Jude Invitational	United States	US$10,500,000	9,000	(United States) Justin Thomas (3)	76		World Golf Championship
9 Aug	English Championship	England	€1,000,000	2,000	(England) Andy Sullivan (4)	24		New tournament
9 Aug; ~~17 May~~	PGA Championship	United States	US$11,000,000	10,000	(United States) Collin Morikawa (1)	100		Major championship
16 Aug	Celtic Classic	Wales	€1,000,000	2,000	(England) Sam Horsfield (2)	24		New tournament
~~23 Aug~~	D+D Real Czech Masters	Czech Republic	–	–	Cancelled	–		
23 Aug	ISPS Handa Wales Open	Wales	€1,000,000	2,000	(France) Romain Langasque (1)	24		
~~30 Aug~~	Omega European Masters	Switzerland	–	–	Cancelled	–		
30 Aug	ISPS Handa UK Championship	England	€1,000,000	2,000	(Denmark) Rasmus Højgaard (2)	24		New tournament
~~6 Sep~~	Porsche European Open	Germany	–	–	Cancelled	–		
6 Sep; ~~3 May~~	Estrella Damm N.A. Andalucía Masters	Spain	€1,250,000	2,000	(United States) John Catlin (1)	24		
13 Sep; ~~25 Oct~~	Portugal Masters	Portugal	€1,000,000	2,000	(South Africa) George Coetzee (5)	24		
~~20 Sep~~	KLM Open	Netherlands	–	–	Cancelled	–		
20 Sep	Open de Portugal	Portugal	€500,000	1,000	(South Africa) Garrick Higgo (1)	18	CHA	
20 Sep; ~~21 Jun~~	U.S. Open	United States	US$12,500,000	10,000	(United States) Bryson DeChambeau (2)	100		Major championship
27 Sep; ~~31 May~~	Dubai Duty Free Irish Open	Northern Ireland	€1,250,000	2,000	(United States) John Catlin (2)	24		~~Rolex Series~~ (Note: Tournament had Rolex Series event status removed following rescheduling with reduced prize money.)
~~4 Oct~~	Alfred Dunhill Links Championship	Scotland	–	–	Cancelled	–		Pro-Am
4 Oct; ~~12 Jul~~	Aberdeen Standard Investments Scottish Open	Scotland	US$7,000,000	7,000	(England) Aaron Rai (2)	36		Rolex Series
11 Oct; ~~13 Sep~~	BMW PGA Championship	England	US$7,000,000	7,000	(England) Tyrrell Hatton (5)	64		Flagship event (Note: Also a Rolex Series tournament.)
~~18 Oct~~	Mutuactivos Open de España	Spain	–	–	Cancelled	–		
18 Oct	Scottish Championship	Scotland	€1,000,000	2,000	(Spain) Adrián Otaegui (3)	24		New tournament
25 Oct; ~~11 Oct~~	Italian Open	Italy	€1,000,000	2,000	(England) Ross McGowan (2)	24		~~Rolex Series~~
~~1 Nov~~	WGC-HSBC Champions	China	–	–	Cancelled	–		World Golf Championship
1 Nov	Aphrodite Hills Cyprus Open	Cyprus	€1,000,000	2,000	(England) Callum Shinkwin (1)	24		New tournament
~~8 Nov~~	Turkish Airlines Open	Turkey	–	–	Cancelled	–		Rolex Series
8 Nov	Aphrodite Hills Cyprus Showdown	Cyprus	€1,000,000	2,000	(Scotland) Robert MacIntyre (1)	24		New tournament
~~15 Nov~~; ~~15 Mar~~	Magical Kenya Open	Kenya	–	–	Cancelled	–		
15 Nov; ~~12 Apr~~	Masters Tournament	United States	US$11,500,000	10,000	(United States) Dustin Johnson (n/a)	100		Major championship
22 Nov	Joburg Open	South Africa	R19,500,000	2,000	(Denmark) Joachim B. Hansen (1)	19	AFR	
29 Nov	Alfred Dunhill Championship	South Africa	R29,000,000	2,750	(South Africa) Christiaan Bezuidenhout (2)	32	AFR	
5 Dec	Golf in Dubai Championship	UAE	US$1,200,000	2,000	(France) Antoine Rozner (1)	24		New tournament
~~6 Dec~~	Australian PGA Championship	Australia	–	–	Cancelled	–	ANZ	
~~6 Dec~~; ~~15 Nov~~	Nedbank Golf Challenge	South Africa	–	–	Cancelled	–	AFR	Rolex Series
6 Dec	South African Open	South Africa	R19,500,000	2,000	(South Africa) Christiaan Bezuidenhout (3)	19	AFR	
13 Dec; ~~22 Nov~~	DP World Tour Championship, Dubai	UAE	US$8,000,000	12,000	(England) Matt Fitzpatrick (6)	46		Tour Championship

=== Unofficial events ===
The following events were sanctioned by the European Tour, but did not carry official money, nor were wins official.

Date	Tournament	Host country	Purse	Winner	OWGR points	Notes
~~10 May~~	GolfSixes Cascais	Portugal	–	Cancelled	n/a	Team event
~~2 Aug~~	Olympic Games	Japan	n/a	Postponed (Note: Postponed to 2021 due to the COVID-19 pandemic.)	–	Limited-field event
~~27 Sep~~	Ryder Cup	United States	n/a	Postponed	n/a	Team event

== Location of tournaments ==
The tournament locations below represent the original schedule, before any changes due to COVID-19 pandemic.

Location of official tournaments of the 2020 European Tour in Europe.
Major Championship
Rolex Series event
Regular event
Location of official tournaments of the 2020 European Tour outside Europe.
Major Championship
World Golf Championship
Rolex Series event
Regular event

South Africa
United Arab Emirates

== Race to Dubai ==
=== Points distribution ===
The distribution of Race to Dubai points for 2020 European Tour events were as follows:

Finishing position	Total pts	1st	2nd	3rd	4th	5th	6th	7th	8th	9th	10th	20th	30th	40th	50th	60th
Major championships	10,000	1,665	1,113	627	500	424	350	300	250	223	200	120	90	68	48	30
World Golf Championships	9,000	1,500	1,000	565	450	381	315	270	225	201	180	108	81	61	43	27
Rolex Series	7,000	1,165	780	438	350	297	245	210	175	156	140	84	63	47	33	21
Regular tournament (Band 6) (Note: Tournaments with purses ranging from $5,000,000 to $5,499,999.)	5,500	915	612	345	275	234	192	165	138	123	110	66	50	37	28	17
Regular tournament (Band 4) (Note: Tournaments with purses ranging from $3,250,000 to $3,999,999.)	4,250	710	472	266	212	180	149	128	106	95	85	51	38	29	20	13
Regular tournament (Band 3) (Note: Tournaments with purses ranging from $2,500,000 to $3,249,999.)	3,500	585	389	218	175	148	123	105	88	78	70	42	32	24	17	11
Regular tournament (Band 2) (Note: Tournaments with purses ranging from $1,750,000 to $2,499,999.)	2,750	460	305	172	137	116	97	83	69	61	55	33	25	19	13	8
Regular tournament (Band 1) (Note: Tournaments with purses ranging from $1,000,000 to $1,749,999.)	2,000	335	222	125	100	84	70	60	50	44	40	24	18	14	10	6
Dual-ranking event (Challenge Tour)	1,000	167	111	63	50	42	35	30	25	22	20	12	9	7	5	3
DP World Tour Championship	12,000	2,000	1,335	752	600	509	420	359	300	267	240	144	108	82	58	36

=== Final standings ===
The Race to Dubai was based on tournament results during the season, calculated using a points-based system.

Pos.	Player	Majors				WGCs				Rolex Series						Top 10s in other ET events			Total pts	Tmts	Money (Note: In addition to tournament prize money, the top five point scorers received a share of a $1.25m bonus pool.)	
Pos.	Player	Opn	PGA	USO	Mas	WGC Mex	WGC MP	WGC Inv	WGC Cha	Abu	Sco	BMW PGA	Tur	Ned	DPW TC	1	2	3	Total pts	Tmts	Reg. (€m)	Bon. ($k)
1	(England) Westwood	C A N C E L L E D	•	T13; 151	T38; 69	T22; 99	C A N C E L L E D	•	C A N C E L L E D	1st 1165	T19; 80	T18; 88	C A N C E L L E D	C A N C E L L E D	2nd 1335	T10; 33			3,128	15	2.3	500
2	(England) Fitzpatrick	C A N C E L L E D	CUT; 0	CUT; 0	T46; 54	T37; 63	C A N C E L L E D	T6; 226	C A N C E L L E D	T2; 523	T42; 41	T7; 180	C A N C E L L E D	C A N C E L L E D	1st 2000				3,110	10	3.5	300
3	(United States) Reed	C A N C E L L E D	T13; 151	T13; 151	T10; 185	1st 1500	C A N C E L L E D	T47; 48	C A N C E L L E D	•	•	T3; 394	C A N C E L L E D	C A N C E L L E D	T3; 676				3,104	8	3.0	200
4	(England) Fleetwood	C A N C E L L E D	T29; 89	CUT; 0	T19; 119	T18; 110	C A N C E L L E D	T35; 63	C A N C E L L E D	T2; 523	2nd 780	T13; 103	C A N C E L L E D	C A N C E L L E D	T10; 215	T3; 113			2,183	11	1.7	150
5	(United States) Morikawa	C A N C E L L E D	1st 1665	CUT; 0	T44; 61	T42; 53	C A N C E L L E D	T20; 103	C A N C E L L E D	•	•	•	C A N C E L L E D	C A N C E L L E D	T10; 215				2,097	6	1.9	100
6	(France) Perez	C A N C E L L E D	T22; 105	CUT; 0	T46; 54	T53; 34	C A N C E L L E D	T65; 22	C A N C E L L E D	T2; 523	T14; 99	2nd 780	C A N C E L L E D	C A N C E L L E D	7th 359				2,073	14	1.6	
7	(South Africa) Bezuidenhout	C A N C E L L E D	CUT; 0	55th 40	T38; 69	T29; 75	C A N C E L L E D	T20; 103	C A N C E L L E D	T59; 21	CUT; 0	T40; 46	C A N C E L L E D	C A N C E L L E D	T14; 157	2nd 472	1st 460	1st 335	1,875	17	1.1	
8	(England) Rai	C A N C E L L E D	•	•	•	•	C A N C E L L E D	•	C A N C E L L E D	CUT; 0	1st 1165	CUT; 0	C A N C E L L E D	C A N C E L L E D	T51; 53	T10; 35	2nd 222	3rd 125	1,741	17	1.3	
9	(England) Hatton	C A N C E L L E D	CUT; 0	CUT; 0	CUT; 0	T6; 270	C A N C E L L E D	T69; 18	C A N C E L L E D	•	•	1st 1165	C A N C E L L E D	C A N C E L L E D	T8; 284				1,737	7	1.4	
10	(South Africa) Oosthuizen	C A N C E L L E D	T33; 79	3rd 627	T23; 110	T51; 41	C A N C E L L E D	T6; 226	C A N C E L L E D	5th 297	•	•	C A N C E L L E D	C A N C E L L E D	•	2nd 222			1,646	8	1.6	

Win
Top 10
Made cut
Missed cut
• Did not play

== UK Swing Order of Merit ==
With the return of the European Tour after the COVID-19 hiatus and as part of the new Golf for Good initiative – which underpinned all events for the remainder of the 2020 season – a mini Order of Merit ran for all six events in the "UK Swing", with the top ten players sharing an additional £250,000 to donate to charities of their choice. The top ten, not otherwise exempt, from the standings of the UK Swing Order of Merit after the first five events received entry into the 2020 U.S. Open.

=== Final standings ===
The UK Swing Order of Merit was based on tournament results during the UK Swing, calculated using a points-based system.

Pos.	Player	Event						Total pts	Tmts	Donation (£)
Pos.	Player	1	2	3	4	5	6	Total pts	Tmts	Donation (£)
1	(Denmark) Rasmus Højgaard	2nd 222	T6; 56	3rd 125	•	•	1st 335	738	4	60,000
2	(England) Sam Horsfield	T10; 36	1st 335	CUT; 0	1st 335	T44; 10	•	716	5	50,000
3	(England) Andy Sullivan	T4; 85	T41; 12	1st 335	T47; 9	•	T9; 42	483	5	40,000
4	(Belgium) Thomas Detry	CUT; 0	2nd 222	T56; 7	2nd 222	•	•	451	4	30,000
5	(Italy) Renato Paratore	1st 335	T28; 18	T34; 14	CUT; 0	T27; 17	•	384	5	20,000
6	(France) Romain Langasque	T53; 7	T57; 6	T26; 18	•	1st 335	CUT; 0	367	5	10,000 (each)
7	(Finland) Sami Välimäki	CUT; 0	•	•	T6; 56	2nd 222	•	278	3	10,000 (each)
8	(Spain) Adrián Otaegui	T35; 15	CUT; 0	2nd 222	T14; 27	T37; 14	•	277	5	10,000 (each)
9	(South Africa) Justin Walters	CUT; 0	CUT; 0	CUT; 0	T39; 13	CUT; 0	2nd 222	235	6	10,000 (each)
10	(England) Matthew Jordan	T17; 25	CUT; 0	CUT; 0	T47; 9	T3; 113	T19; 23	170	6	10,000 (each)

Win
Top 10
Made cut
Missed cut
• Did not play

=== U.S. Open qualifiers ===
The leading players in the points standings following the ISPS Handa Wales Open, who qualified for 2020 U.S. Open, were as follows:

- Thomas Detry
- Justin Harding
- Rasmus Højgaard
- Sam Horsfield
- Romain Langasque
- Adrián Otaegui
- Renato Paratore
- Andy Sullivan
- Connor Syme
- Sami Välimäki

== Awards ==
Award	Winner	Ref.
Golfer of the Year	(England) Lee Westwood	
Players' Player of the Year (Seve Ballesteros Award)	(England) Lee Westwood	
Sir Henry Cotton Rookie of the Year	(Finland) Sami Välimäki	
Graduate of the Year	(France) Antoine Rozner	

== See also ==
- 2019 in golf
- 2020 in golf
- 2020 European Senior Tour
