= 2018 European Tour =

Golf tour season

2018 European Tour season
- Duration: 23 November 2017 – 18 November 2018
- Number of official events: 47
- Most wins: (England) Matt Wallace (3)
- Race to Dubai: (Italy) Francesco Molinari
- Golfer of the Year: (Italy) Francesco Molinari
- Players' Player of the Year: (Italy) Francesco Molinari
- Sir Henry Cotton Rookie of the Year: (India) Shubhankar Sharma
- Graduate of the Year: (South Africa) Erik van Rooyen

The 2018 European Tour was the 47th season of the European Tour, the main professional golf tour in Europe since its inaugural season in 1972.

== Changes for 2018 ==
There were changes to membership criteria with the reversal of some of the changes introduced for the 2017 season; the number of players gaining exemption from the final Race to Dubai standings reverted to the top 110 and the Access List was scrapped, largely replaced by a re-ranking system.

The Race to Dubai points system was adjusted, with all prize money being converted into U.S. dollars before translating into points (1 point = 1 dollar) having previously been calculated after converting into euro. The points for all tournaments were also fixed prior to the start of the season, having previously been set during each tournament week, thereby negating any fluctuation in exchange rates.

=== Tournament changes ===
- New tournaments: Oman Open.
- Returning tournaments (not part of the 2017 season): Open de España, AfrAsia Bank Mauritius Open (missing from the 2017 schedule due to date change), Belgian Knockout (formerly the Belgian Open).
- No longer part of the schedule: Alfred Dunhill Championship (not held due to course renovations; returned for the 2019 season), Open de Portugal (dropped down to the Challenge Tour), Shenzhen International, Paul Lawrie Matchplay.
- Format change: the Lyoness Open (Austrian Open) became the Shot Clock Masters, with all shots subject to a strict time limit before incurring penalty strokes.

== Schedule ==
The following table lists official events during the 2018 season.

Date	Tournament	Host country	Purse	Winner (Note: The number in brackets after each winner's name is the number of European Tour events they had won up to and including that tournament. This information is only shown for European Tour members.)	OWGR points	Other tours (Note: AFR − Sunshine Tour; ANZ − PGA Tour of Australasia; ASA − Asian Tour.)	Notes
26 Nov	UBS Hong Kong Open	Hong Kong	US$2,000,000	(Australia) Wade Ormsby (1)	34	ASA	
3 Dec	Australian PGA Championship	Australia	A$1,500,000	(Australia) Cameron Smith (n/a)	23	ANZ	
3 Dec	AfrAsia Bank Mauritius Open	Mauritius	€1,000,000	(South Africa) Dylan Frittelli (2)	17	AFR, ASA	
11 Dec	Joburg Open	South Africa	R16,500,000	(India) Shubhankar Sharma (1)	17	AFR, ASA	
14 Jan	BMW SA Open	South Africa	R15,000,000	(England) Chris Paisley (1)	32	AFR (Note: Sunshine Tour flagship event)	
21 Jan	Abu Dhabi HSBC Championship	UAE	US$3,000,000	(England) Tommy Fleetwood (4)	52		
28 Jan	Omega Dubai Desert Classic	UAE	US$3,000,000	(China) Li Haotong (2)	48		
4 Feb	Maybank Championship	Malaysia	US$3,000,000	(India) Shubhankar Sharma (2)	38	ASA	
11 Feb	ISPS Handa World Super 6 Perth	Australia	A$1,750,000	(Thailand) Kiradech Aphibarnrat (4)	23	ANZ, ASA	
18 Feb	NBO Oman Open	Oman	US$1,750,000	(Netherlands) Joost Luiten (6)	24		New tournament
25 Feb	Commercial Bank Qatar Masters	Qatar	US$1,750,000	(England) Eddie Pepperell (1)	24		
4 Mar	WGC-Mexico Championship	Mexico	US$10,000,000	(United States) Phil Mickelson (n/a)	72		World Golf Championship
4 Mar	Tshwane Open	South Africa	R15,000,000	(South Africa) George Coetzee (4)	19	AFR	
11 Mar	Hero Indian Open	India	US$1,750,000	(England) Matt Wallace (2)	22	ASA	
25 Mar	WGC-Dell Technologies Match Play	United States	US$10,000,000	(United States) Bubba Watson (n/a)	74		World Golf Championship
8 Apr	Masters Tournament	United States	US$11,000,000	(United States) Patrick Reed (2)	100		Major championship
15 Apr	Open de España	Spain	€1,500,000	(Spain) Jon Rahm (3)	26		
22 Apr	Trophée Hassan II	Morocco	€2,500,000	(France) Alexander Lévy (5)	24		
29 Apr	Volvo China Open	China	CN¥20,000,000	(Sweden) Alexander Björk (1)	32	ASA	
13 May	Rocco Forte Sicilian Open	Italy	€1,000,000	(Sweden) Joakim Lagergren (1)	24		
20 May	Belgian Knockout	Belgium	€1,000,000	(Spain) Adrián Otaegui (2)	24		
27 May	BMW PGA Championship	England	US$7,000,000	(Italy) Francesco Molinari (5)	64		Flagship event (Note: Also a Rolex Series tournament.)
3 Jun	Italian Open	Italy	US$7,000,000	(Denmark) Thorbjørn Olesen (5)	38		Rolex Series
10 Jun	Shot Clock Masters	Austria	€1,000,000	(Finland) Mikko Korhonen (1)	24		
17 Jun	U.S. Open	United States	US$12,000,000	(United States) Brooks Koepka (3)	100		Major championship
24 Jun	BMW International Open	Germany	€2,000,000	(England) Matt Wallace (3)	24		
1 Jul	HNA Open de France	France	US$7,000,000	(Sweden) Alex Norén (10)	48		Rolex Series
8 Jul	Dubai Duty Free Irish Open	Ireland	US$7,000,000	(Scotland) Russell Knox (2)	38		Rolex Series
15 Jul	Aberdeen Standard Investments Scottish Open	Scotland	US$7,000,000	(South Africa) Brandon Stone (3)	48		Rolex Series
22 Jul	The Open Championship	Scotland	US$10,500,000	(Italy) Francesco Molinari (6)	100		Major championship
29 Jul	Porsche European Open	Germany	€2,000,000	(England) Richard McEvoy (1)	24		
5 Aug	Fiji International	Fiji	A$1,250,000	(India) Gaganjeet Bhullar (1)	15	ANZ, ASA	
5 Aug	WGC-Bridgestone Invitational	United States	US$10,000,000	(United States) Justin Thomas (2)	74		World Golf Championship
12 Aug	PGA Championship	United States	US$10,500,000	(United States) Brooks Koepka (4)	100		Major championship
19 Aug	Nordea Masters	Sweden	€1,500,000	(England) Paul Waring (1)	24		
26 Aug	D+D Real Czech Masters	Czech Republic	€1,000,000	(Italy) Andrea Pavan (1)	24		
2 Sep	Made in Denmark	Denmark	€1,500,000	(England) Matt Wallace (4)	24		
9 Sep	Omega European Masters	Switzerland	€2,500,000	(England) Matt Fitzpatrick (5)	26		
16 Sep	KLM Open	Netherlands	€1,800,000	(China) Wu Ashun (3)	24		
23 Sep	Portugal Masters	Portugal	€2,000,000	(England) Tom Lewis (2)	24		
7 Oct	Alfred Dunhill Links Championship	Scotland	US$5,000,000	(Denmark) Lucas Bjerregaard (2)	38		Pro-Am
14 Oct	Sky Sports British Masters	England	£3,000,000	(England) Eddie Pepperell (2)	38		
22 Oct	Andalucía Valderrama Masters	Spain	€2,000,000	(Spain) Sergio García (15)	24		
28 Oct	WGC-HSBC Champions	China	US$10,000,000	(United States) Xander Schauffele (1)	66		World Golf Championship
4 Nov	Turkish Airlines Open	Turkey	US$7,000,000	(England) Justin Rose (11)	36		Rolex Series; Limited-field event
11 Nov	Nedbank Golf Challenge	South Africa	US$7,500,000	(England) Lee Westwood (24)	34		Rolex Series; Limited-field event
18 Nov	DP World Tour Championship, Dubai	UAE	US$8,000,000	(England) Danny Willett (6)	52		Tour Championship

=== Unofficial events ===
The following events were sanctioned by the European Tour, but did not carry official money, nor were wins official.

Date	Tournament	Host country	Purse	Winners	OWGR points	Notes
14 Jan	EurAsia Cup	Malaysia	n/a	Team Europe	n/a	Team event
6 May	GolfSixes	England	€1,000,000	(Republic of Ireland) Paul Dunne and (Republic of Ireland) Gavin Moynihan	n/a	Team event
12 Aug	European Golf Team Championships	Scotland	€550,000	(Spain) Scott Fernández and (Spain) Pedro Oriol (Men)	n/a	Team event
12 Aug	European Golf Team Championships	Scotland	€550,000	(Sweden) Cajsa Persson and (Sweden) Linda Wessberg (Women)	n/a	Team event
12 Aug	European Golf Team Championships	Scotland	€550,000	Iceland (Team)	n/a	Team event
30 Sep	Ryder Cup	France	n/a	Team Europe	n/a	Team event
25 Nov	ISPS Handa Melbourne World Cup of Golf	Australia	US$7,000,000	(Belgium) Thomas Detry and (Belgium) Thomas Pieters	n/a	Team event

== Location of tournaments ==
Location of official tournaments of the 2018 European Tour in Europe.
Major Championship
Rolex Series event
Regular event
Location of official tournaments of the 2018 European Tour outside Europe.
Major Championship
World Golf Championship
Rolex Series event
Regular event

South Africa
United Arab Emirates

== Race to Dubai ==
The Race to Dubai was based on tournament results during the season, calculated using a points-based system.

Pos.	Player	Majors				WGCs				Rolex Series								Top 10s in other ET events					Tmts	Points and money (Note: In addition to tournament prize money, the top 10 point scorers received a share of a $5m bonus pool.)		
Pos.	Player	Mas	USO	Opn	PGA	WGC Mex	WGC MP	WGC Inv	WGC Cha	BMW PGA	Ita	Fra	Ire	Sco	Tur	Ned	DPW TC	1	2	3	4	5	Tmts	Reg. points	Bon. ($)	Total points
1	(Italy) Molinari	T20	T25	1st	T6	T25	17th	T39	T43	1st	2nd	•	•	•	•	•	T26						12	4,791,521	1,250,000	6,041,521
2	(United States) Reed	1st	4th	T28	CUT	T37	T9	T28	T7	•	•	•	•	T23	•	•	T2	T9					11	3,963,351	750,000	4,713,351
3	(England) Fleetwood	T17	2nd	T12	T35	T14	T17	T14	T7	T20	T23	CUT	•	•	T7	•	T16	6th	1st	T6	T2	T9	19	3,799,755	600,000	4,399,755
4	(United States) Schauffele	T50	T6	T2	T35	T18	T17	68th	1st	•	•	•	•	•	•	•	T16						9	3,207,488	400,000	3,607,488
5	(England) Rose	T12	T10	T2	T19	T37	•	•	T3	•	•	•	•	T9	1st	•	•	T10	8th				11	3,431,616	~~500,000~~ (Note: By missing the DP World Tour Championship, Dubai, Rose was not eligible for the bonus pool.)	3,431,616
6	(Sweden) Norén	CUT	T25	T17	CUT	T14	3rd	T31	T18	T3	T23	1st	•	•	•	•	T9						12	3,001,488	350,000	3,351,488
7	(Northern Ireland) McIlroy	T5	CUT	T2	T50	•	T36	T6	T54	T2	•	•	T28	•	•	T21	T20	T3	2nd				13	2,990,654	325,000	3,315,654
8	(Denmark) Olesen	•	CUT	T12	T56	•	•	T3	T7	T60	1st	CUT	T6	•	T7	•	T45	10th	T2	4th			27	2,923,149	300,000	3,223,149
9	(China) Li	T32	T16	T39	WD	63rd	T59	T39	T11	T43	T19	T21	CUT	T23	2nd	T5	T30	1st	T5	T9			27	2,843,291	275,000	3,118,291
10	(England) Wallace	•	CUT	CUT	•	•	•	•	T50	T20	T51	CUT	CUT	CUT	T47	T5	T2	1st	T3	1st	1st		32	2,637,527	250,000	2,887,527

Win
Top 10
Made cut
Missed cut
Withdrew
• Did not play

== Awards ==
Award	Winner	Ref.
Golfer of the Year	(Italy) Francesco Molinari	
Players' Player of the Year (Seve Ballesteros Award)	(Italy) Francesco Molinari	
Sir Henry Cotton Rookie of the Year	(India) Shubhankar Sharma	
Graduate of the Year	(South Africa) Erik van Rooyen	

== See also ==
- 2017 in golf
- 2018 in golf
- 2018 Challenge Tour
- 2018 European Senior Tour
