= Rolex series =

The Rolex series may refer to:

- Rolex Series (golf), a series of men's professional golf tournaments as part of the European Tour.
- Rolex Sports Car Series, a former premier series created by the Grand American Road Racing Association.
- Rolex Series of Show Jumping, a series of show jumping events.
