= 2017 European Tour =

Golf tour season

2017 European Tour season
- Duration: 1 December 2016 – 19 November 2017
- Number of official events: 47
- Most wins: (Spain) Sergio García (3)
- Race to Dubai: (England) Tommy Fleetwood
- Golfer of the Year: (Spain) Sergio García
- Players' Player of the Year: (England) Tommy Fleetwood
- Sir Henry Cotton Rookie of the Year: (Spain) Jon Rahm
- Graduate of the Year: (South Africa) Dylan Frittelli

The 2017 European Tour was the 46th season of the European Tour, the main professional golf tour in Europe since its inaugural season in 1972.

== Changes for 2017 ==
For the 2017 season, the European Tour created the Rolex Series; a group of selected tournaments with a minimum purse of US$7,000,000. Seven tournaments were initially announced: the BMW PGA Championship, the Dubai Duty Free Irish Open, the Aberdeen Asset Management Scottish Open, the Italian Open and the three former Final Series events; the Turkish Airlines Open, the Nedbank Golf Challenge and the DP World Tour Championship, Dubai. The HNA Open de France was later announced as the eighth Rolex Series event.

There were changes to membership criteria with the creation of a new "Access List", a season-long money list excluding the Masters Tournament, PGA Championship, the four World Golf Championships and the Rolex Series events. The top three players in the Access List standings would be invited to play in Rolex Series events, and the top 10 players in the Access List final standings not otherwise exempt would gain full European Tour membership for the following season. There was a corresponding reduction in numbers from the Race to Dubai final standings gaining cards, down from the top 110 to the top 100.

=== Tournament changes ===
- New tournaments: GolfSixes.
- Returning tournaments (not part of the 2016 season): Hong Kong Open, Sicilian Open, Andalucía Masters, Open de Portugal.
- No longer part of the schedule: True Thailand Classic, King's Cup, AfrAsia Bank Mauritius Open (due to date change from May to December; returned for the 2018 season).
- Format change: the Perth International became the ISPS Handa World Super 6 Perth, with the top-24 players after 54-hole stroke play competing in a 6-hole knockout match play tournament on the final day.

== Schedule ==
The following table lists official events during the 2017 season.

Date	Tournament	Host country	Purse	Winner (Note: The number in brackets after each winner's name is the number of European Tour events they had won up to and including that tournament. This information is only shown for European Tour members.)	OWGR points	Other tours (Note: AFR − Sunshine Tour; ANZ − PGA Tour of Australasia; ASA − Asian Tour; CHA − Challenge Tour; ONE − OneAsia Tour.)	Notes
4 Dec	Australian PGA Championship	Australia	A$1,500,000	(United States) Harold Varner III (1)	22	ANZ	
4 Dec	Alfred Dunhill Championship	South Africa	€1,200,000	(South Africa) Brandon Stone (2)	32	AFR (Note: Sunshine Tour flagship event)	
11 Dec	UBS Hong Kong Open	Hong Kong	US$2,000,000	(Australia) Sam Brazel (1)	32	ASA	
15 Jan	BMW SA Open	South Africa	R15,000,000	(England) Graeme Storm (2)	26	AFR	
22 Jan	Abu Dhabi HSBC Golf Championship	UAE	US$2,700,000	(England) Tommy Fleetwood (2)	50		
29 Jan	Commercial Bank Qatar Masters	Qatar	US$2,500,000	(South Korea) Wang Jeung-hun (3)	32		
5 Feb	Omega Dubai Desert Classic	UAE	US$2,650,000	(Spain) Sergio García (12)	46		
12 Feb	Maybank Championship	Malaysia	US$3,000,000	(Paraguay) Fabrizio Zanotti (2)	36	ASA	
19 Feb	ISPS Handa World Super 6 Perth	Australia	A$1,750,000	(Australia) Brett Rumford (6)	23	ANZ, ASA	
26 Feb	Joburg Open	South Africa	R16,500,000	(South Africa) Darren Fichardt (5)	19	AFR	
5 Mar	Tshwane Open	South Africa	R16,500,000	(South Africa) Dean Burmester (1)	19	AFR	
5 Mar	WGC-Mexico Championship	Mexico	US$9,750,000	(United States) Dustin Johnson (n/a)	76		World Golf Championship
12 Mar	Hero Indian Open	India	US$1,750,000	(India) Shiv Chawrasia (4)	21	ASA	
26 Mar	WGC-Dell Technologies Match Play	United States	US$9,750,000	(United States) Dustin Johnson (n/a)	74		World Golf Championship
9 Apr	Masters Tournament	United States	US$11,000,000	(Spain) Sergio García (13)	100		Major championship
16 Apr	Trophée Hassan II	Morocco	€2,500,000	(Italy) Edoardo Molinari (3)	24		
23 Apr	Shenzhen International	China	US$2,800,000	(Austria) Bernd Wiesberger (4)	26		
30 Apr	Volvo China Open	China	CN¥20,000,000	(France) Alexander Lévy (4)	24	ONE	
14 May	Open de Portugal	Portugal	€500,000	(England) Matt Wallace (1)	18	CHA	
21 May	Rocco Forte Open	Italy	€1,000,000	(Spain) Álvaro Quirós (7)	24		
28 May	BMW PGA Championship	England	US$7,000,000	(Sweden) Alex Norén (9)	64		Flagship event (Note: Also a Rolex Series tournament.)
4 Jun	Nordea Masters	Sweden	€1,500,000	(Italy) Renato Paratore (1)	32		
11 Jun	Lyoness Open	Austria	€1,000,000	(South Africa) Dylan Frittelli (1)	24		
18 Jun	U.S. Open	United States	US$12,000,000	(United States) Brooks Koepka (2)	100		Major championship
25 Jun	BMW International Open	Germany	€2,000,000	(Argentina) Andrés Romero (2)	32		
2 Jul	HNA Open de France	France	US$7,000,000	(England) Tommy Fleetwood (3)	46		Rolex Series
9 Jul	Dubai Duty Free Irish Open	Northern Ireland	US$7,000,000	(Spain) Jon Rahm (1)	48		Rolex Series
16 Jul	Aberdeen Asset Management Scottish Open	Scotland	US$7,000,000	(Spain) Rafa Cabrera-Bello (3)	50		Rolex Series
23 Jul	The Open Championship	England	US$10,250,000	(United States) Jordan Spieth (n/a)	100		Major championship
30 Jul	Porsche European Open	Germany	€2,000,000	(England) Jordan Smith (1)	24		
6 Aug	WGC-Bridgestone Invitational	United States	US$9,750,000	(Japan) Hideki Matsuyama (n/a)	76		World Golf Championship
13 Aug	PGA Championship	United States	US$10,500,000	(United States) Justin Thomas (1)	100		Major championship
20 Aug	Fiji International	Fiji	A$1,500,000	(Australia) Jason Norris (1)	15	ANZ, ASA	
20 Aug	Saltire Energy Paul Lawrie Match Play	Germany	€1,000,000	(Spain) Adrián Otaegui (1)	24		Limited-field event
27 Aug	Made in Denmark	Denmark	€1,800,000	(United States) Julian Suri (1)	24		
3 Sep	D+D Real Czech Masters	Czech Republic	€1,000,000	(South Africa) Haydn Porteous (2)	24		
10 Sep	Omega European Masters	Switzerland	€2,700,000	(England) Matt Fitzpatrick (4)	32	ASA	
17 Sep	KLM Open	Netherlands	€1,800,000	(France) Romain Wattel (1)	24		
24 Sep	Portugal Masters	Portugal	€2,000,000	(Denmark) Lucas Bjerregaard (1)	24		
1 Oct	British Masters	England	£3,000,000	(Republic of Ireland) Paul Dunne (1)	38		
8 Oct	Alfred Dunhill Links Championship	Scotland	US$5,000,000	(England) Tyrrell Hatton (2)	34		Pro-Am
15 Oct	Italian Open	Italy	US$7,000,000	(England) Tyrrell Hatton (3)	42		Rolex Series
22 Oct	Andalucía Valderrama Masters	Spain	€2,000,000	(Spain) Sergio García (14)	24		
29 Oct	WGC-HSBC Champions	China	US$9,750,000	(England) Justin Rose (9)	64		World Golf Championship
5 Nov	Turkish Airlines Open	Turkey	US$7,000,000	(England) Justin Rose (10)	40		Rolex Series; Limited-field event
12 Nov	Nedbank Golf Challenge	South Africa	US$7,500,000	(South Africa) Branden Grace (8)	44		Rolex Series; Limited-field event
19 Nov	DP World Tour Championship, Dubai	UAE	US$8,000,000	(Spain) Jon Rahm (2)	50		Tour Championship

=== Unofficial events ===
The following events were sanctioned by the European Tour, but did not carry official money, nor were wins official.

Date	Tournament	Host country	Purse	Winners	OWGR points	Notes
7 May	GolfSixes	England	€1,000,000	(Denmark) Lucas Bjerregaard and (Denmark) Thorbjørn Olesen	n/a	New tournament Team event

== Location of tournaments ==
Location of official tournaments of the 2017 European Tour in Europe.
Major Championship
Rolex Series event
Regular event
Location of official tournaments of the 2017 European Tour outside Europe.
Major Championship
World Golf Championship
Rolex Series event
Regular event

South Africa
United Arab Emirates

== Race to Dubai ==
The Race to Dubai was based on tournament results during the season, calculated using a points-based system.

Pos.	Player	Majors				WGCs				Rolex Series								Top 10s in other ET events				Tmts	Points and money (Note: In addition to tournament prize money, the top 10 point scorers received a share of a $5m bonus pool.)		
Pos.	Player	Mas	USO	Opn	PGA	WGC Mex	WGC MP	WGC Inv	WGC Cha	BMW PGA	Fra	Ire	Sco	Ita	Tur	Ned	DPW TC	1	2	3	4	Tmts	Reg. points	Bon. ($)	Total points
1	(England) Fleetwood	CUT	4th	T27	T61	2nd	T39	T28	T20	CUT	1st	T10	•	T6	T23	T10	T21	T3	1st	2nd	T6	24	4,316,566	1,250,000	5,420,530
2	(England) Rose	2nd	CUT	T54	CUT	T38	•	T63	1st	T12	•	T4	•	•	1st	•	T4					12	4,252,135	750,000	4,921,062
3	(Spain) Rahm	T27	CUT	T44	T58	T3	2nd	T28	T36	•	T10	1st	•	T15	•	•	1st					13	4,040,202	600,000	4,602,281
4	(Spain) García	1st	T21	T37	CUT	T12	T30	T39	•	•	•	•	•	T30	•	•	T4	1st	1st			13	3,457,467	500,000	3,906,072
5	(England) Hatton	CUT	CUT	CUT	CUT	T10	T17	T36	T11	T30	CUT	CUT	CUT	1st	T16	T19	T8	T3	T3	T8	1st	21	2,879,918	400,000	3,237,346
6	(England) R. Fisher	T41	CUT	T44	CUT	T3	T5	T44	T58	T9	T7	•	T35	T2	•	T34	T17	T3	T6	2nd		23	2,631,633	350,000	2,942,728
7	(Spain) Cabrera-Bello	•	T42	T4	CUT	T38	T17	72nd	T5	•	•	CUT	1st	•	•	T42	T21	2nd	T6	T5		19	2,481,527	325,000	2,770,297
8	(Sweden) Norén	CUT	CUT	T6	T67	T55	T5	T28	T31	1st	T10	•	CUT	T38	•	T12	T45	T6				20	2,218,368	300,000	2,483,867
9	(Italy) F. Molinari	T33	CUT	CUT	T2	T20	T58	T24	T46	2nd	T38	•	•	T6	•	T27	T17					13	2,037,707	275,000	2,282,706
10	(South Africa) Grace	T27	T50	T6	CUT	T32	T39	T28	T15	T9	•	•	T15	•	•	1st	T31					15	2,030,137	250,000	2,252,135

Win
Top 10
Made cut
Missed cut
• Did not play

== Awards ==
Award	Winner	Ref.
Golfer of the Year	(Spain) Sergio García	
Players' Player of the Year (Seve Ballesteros Award)	(England) Tommy Fleetwood	
Sir Henry Cotton Rookie of the Year	(Spain) Jon Rahm	
Graduate of the Year	(South Africa) Dylan Frittelli	

== See also ==
- 2016 in golf
- 2017 in golf
- 2017 European Senior Tour
