= BMW International Open =

Coordinates: 48.276°N 11.775°E

Tournament information
- Location: Munich, Germany
- Established: 1989
- Course: Golfclub München Eichenried
- Par: 72
- Length: 7,347 yards (6,718 m)
- Tour: European Tour
- Format: Stroke play
- Prize fund: US$2,500,000
- Month played: July

Tournament record score
- Aggregate: 261 John Daly (2001)
- To par: −27 as above

Current champion
- (South Africa) Michael Hollick

Final champion
- Location in Germany Location in Bavaria

The BMW International Open is an annual men's professional golf tournament on the European Tour held in Germany.

== History ==
Founded in 1989, it was held near BMW's home city of Munich every year until 2012. From 1989 to 1993 and from 1997 to 2011 it was played at the Golfclub München Eichenried while from 1994 to 1996 it was held at St. Eurach Land-und-Golfclub. In 2012, 2014, 2016 and 2018, the event was played at Golf Club Gut Lärchenhof near Cologne, alternating with Golfclub München Eichenried, which hosted the event in 2011, 2013, 2015, 2017 and 2019.

The event was for a time the only European Tour event played in Germany, until the Porsche European Open moved to Germany in 2015.

== Winners ==
Year	Winner	Score	To par	Margin of victory	Runner(s)-up
2026	(South Africa) Michael Hollick	270	−18	1 stroke	(South Africa) Hennie du Plessis
2025	(England) Dan Brown	266	−22	2 strokes	(England) Jordan Smith
2024	(Scotland) Ewen Ferguson	270	−18	2 strokes	(Australia) David Micheluzzi (England) Jordan Smith
2023	(South Africa) Thriston Lawrence	275	−13	1 stroke	(Netherlands) Joost Luiten
2022	(China) Li Haotong	266	−22	Playoff	(Belgium) Thomas Pieters
2021	(Norway) Viktor Hovland	269	−19	2 strokes	(Germany) Martin Kaymer
2020	Cancelled due to the COVID-19 pandemic				
2019	(Italy) Andrea Pavan	273	−15	Playoff	(England) Matt Fitzpatrick
2018	(England) Matt Wallace	278	−10	1 stroke	(Germany) Martin Kaymer (Finland) Mikko Korhonen (Denmark) Thorbjørn Olesen
2017	(Argentina) Andrés Romero	271	−17	1 stroke	(England) Richard Bland (Belgium) Thomas Detry (Spain) Sergio García
2016	(Sweden) Henrik Stenson (2)	271	−17	3 strokes	(South Africa) Darren Fichardt (Denmark) Thorbjørn Olesen
2015	(Spain) Pablo Larrazábal (2)	271	−17	1 stroke	(Sweden) Henrik Stenson
2014	(Paraguay) Fabrizio Zanotti	269	−19	Playoff	(Spain) Rafa Cabrera-Bello (France) Grégory Havret (Sweden) Henrik Stenson
2013	(South Africa) Ernie Els	270	−18	1 stroke	(Denmark) Thomas Bjørn
2012	(England) Danny Willett	277	−11	Playoff	(Australia) Marcus Fraser
2011	(Spain) Pablo Larrazábal	272	−16	Playoff	(Spain) Sergio García
2010	(England) David Horsey	270	−18	1 stroke	(England) Ross Fisher
2009	(England) Nick Dougherty	266	−22	1 stroke	(Argentina) Rafael Echenique
2008	(Germany) Martin Kaymer	273	−15	Playoff	(Denmark) Anders Hansen
2007	(Sweden) Niclas Fasth	275	−13	2 strokes	(Germany) Bernhard Langer (Portugal) José-Filipe Lima
2006	(Sweden) Henrik Stenson	273	−15	Playoff	(South Africa) Retief Goosen (Republic of Ireland) Pádraig Harrington
2005	(England) David Howell	265	−23	1 stroke	(United States) John Daly (Australia) Brett Rumford
2004	(Spain) Miguel Ángel Jiménez	267	−21	2 strokes	(France) Thomas Levet
2003	(England) Lee Westwood	269	−19	3 strokes	(Germany) Alex Čejka
2002	(Denmark) Thomas Bjørn (2)	264	−24	4 strokes	(England) John Bickerton (Germany) Bernhard Langer
2001	(United States) John Daly	261	−27	1 stroke	(Republic of Ireland) Pádraig Harrington
2000	(Denmark) Thomas Bjørn	268	−20	3 strokes	(Germany) Bernhard Langer
1999	(Scotland) Colin Montgomerie	268	−20	3 strokes	(Republic of Ireland) Pádraig Harrington
1998	(England) Russell Claydon	270	−18	1 stroke	(England) Jamie Spence
1997	(Sweden) Robert Karlsson	264	−24	Playoff	(England) Carl Watts
1996	(France) Marc Farry	132 (Note: Shortened to 36 holes due to rain.)	−12	1 stroke	(Australia) Richard Green
1995	(New Zealand) Frank Nobilo	272	−16	2 strokes	(Germany) Bernhard Langer (Sweden) Jarmo Sandelin
1994	(Zimbabwe) Mark McNulty	274	−14	1 stroke	(Spain) Seve Ballesteros
1993	(Australia) Peter Fowler	267	−21	3 strokes	(Wales) Ian Woosnam
1992	(United States) Paul Azinger (2)	266	−22	Playoff	(United States) Glen Day (Sweden) Anders Forsbrand (England) Mark James (Germany) Bernhard Langer
1991	(Scotland) Sandy Lyle	268	−20	3 strokes	(Zimbabwe) Tony Johnstone
1990	(United States) Paul Azinger	277	−11	Playoff	(Northern Ireland) David Feherty
1989	(Northern Ireland) David Feherty	269	−19	5 strokes	(United States) Fred Couples
