= GolfSixes =

Golf tournament

Coordinates: 38.41°N 9.28°W

GolfSixes Cascais

Tournament information
- Location: Cascais, Portugal
- Established: 2017
- Course: Oitavos Dunes
- Par: 70
- Length: 6,631 yards (6,063 m)
- Tour: European Tour (unofficial event)
- Format: Team match play
- Prize fund: €1,000,000
- Month played: June
- Final year: 2019

Tournament record score
- Score: 3–1 Denmark (Note: Lucas Bjerregaard and Thorbjørn Olesen) (2017)

Final champion
- Thailand (Note: Thongchai Jaidee and Phachara Khongwatmai)
- Location in Portugal

The GolfSixes Cascais is an unofficial money team golf tournament on the European Tour. The inaugural edition was played at Centurion Club in St Albans, England in May 2017. It featured a 32-player field consisting of 16 teams of two, each representing a nation, competing for a €1 million purse.

== Rules ==
The first day's play has the teams split into four groups of four. In the group stages three points are given for winning a match, with one point given for a draw. The top two teams from each group progress to the knockout stages – the quarterfinals, the semifinals, a 3rd/4th place playoff match and the final – all of which were contested on the second and final day.

The winner of each match is the team with the most holes won after a six-hole contest. A greensomes match play format is used, where all four players drive and the teams choose the best tee shot, and from there play alternate shots.

A shot clock is in operation at the fourth hole, with the players permitted 30 seconds to play each shot and any breach of time incurring a stroke penalty.

== Winners ==
| Year | Winners | Score | Runners-up |
GolfSixes Cascais
| 2020 | Cancelled due to the COVID-19 pandemic | | |
| 2019 | Thailand | 2–1 | England (Note: Tom Lewis and Paul Waring) |
GolfSixes
| 2018 | Ireland (Note: Paul Dunne and Gavin Moynihan) | 2–0 | France (Note: Mike Lorenzo-Vera and Romain Wattel) |
| 2017 | Denmark | 3–1 | Australia (Note: Scott Hend and Sam Brazel) |
