= 2019 European Tour =

Golf tour season

2019 European Tour season
- Duration: 22 November 2018 – 24 November 2019
- Number of official events: 46
- Most wins: (Spain) Jon Rahm (3) (Austria) Bernd Wiesberger (3)
- Race to Dubai: (Spain) Jon Rahm
- Golfer of the Year: (Spain) Jon Rahm
- Players' Player of the Year: (Spain) Jon Rahm
- Sir Henry Cotton Rookie of the Year: (Scotland) Robert MacIntyre
- Graduate of the Year: (Scotland) Robert MacIntyre

The 2019 European Tour was the 48th season of the European Tour, the main professional golf tour in Europe since its inaugural season in 1972.

== Changes for 2019 ==
=== Rule changes ===
From 1 January 2019 onwards, tournaments followed the new rules released by the USGA and The R&A which were designed to simplify the rule book and speed up the pace of play. The most noticeable changes included golfers being able to putt on the green with the flag remaining in, and drops being made from knee rather than shoulder height.

=== Scheduling changes ===
As announced in 2017, the PGA Championship was moved from August to May, starting in 2019. The PGA of America cited the addition of golf to the Summer Olympics, as well as cooler weather enabling a wider array of options for host courses, as reasoning for the change. It was also believed that the PGA Tour wished to re-align its season so that its FedEx Cup Playoffs would not have to compete with the start of the NFL season in early September, since both United States broadcast partners (CBS and NBC) are NFL broadcast partners.

Consequently, the European Tour moved their flagship event; the BMW PGA Championship, from the congested May date to late September, four weeks after the end of the 2018–19 PGA Tour season. It was hoped the date would attract more top names.

=== Changes to the Race to Dubai ===
The number of Race to Dubai points available in the Final Series (last three events of the season) was increased, and the field size reduced. The aim was to make more players still have a chance of winning the Race to Dubai entering the Final Series. In addition, although the prize money was not increased, the bonus pool of US$5,000,000 would now be split among the top five players rather than the top ten. The money saved from restricting field sizes was used solely to increase the first prizes, which means that the tournaments would not have the standard prize fund distribution, and the DP World Tour Championship, Dubai would have the largest tournament first prize in golf of US$3,000,000.

=== Tournament changes ===
- New tournament: Saudi International.
- Returning tournament: Alfred Dunhill Championship (not held during the 2018 season due to course renovations)
- Tournaments on the European Tour schedule for the first time: ISPS Handa Vic Open, Kenya Open.
- Changes to the Rolex Series: the Abu Dhabi Golf Championship replaced the Open de France.
- No longer part of the schedule: Joburg Open, Tshwane Open, Sicilian Open, Fiji International, Shot Clock Masters.

== Schedule ==
The following table lists official events during the 2019 season.

Date	Tournament	Host country	Purse	R2D points	Winner (Note: The number in brackets after each winner's name is the number of European Tour events they had won up to and including that tournament. This information is only shown for European Tour members.)	OWGR points	Other tours (Note: AFR − Sunshine Tour; ANZ − PGA Tour of Australasia; ASA − Asian Tour.)	Notes
25 Nov	Honma Hong Kong Open	Hong Kong	US$2,000,000	2,750	(England) Aaron Rai (1)	30	ASA	
2 Dec	Australian PGA Championship	Australia	A$1,500,000	2,000	(Australia) Cameron Smith (n/a)	20	ANZ	
2 Dec	AfrAsia Bank Mauritius Open	Mauritius	€1,000,000	2,000	(United States) Kurt Kitayama (1)	17	AFR, ASA	
9 Dec	South African Open	South Africa	R17,500,000	2,000	(South Africa) Louis Oosthuizen (9)	32	AFR, (Note: Sunshine Tour flagship event) ASA	
16 Dec	Alfred Dunhill Championship	South Africa	€1,500,000	2,750	(United States) David Lipsky (2)	23	AFR	
19 Jan	Abu Dhabi HSBC Championship	UAE	US$7,000,000	7,000	(Republic of Ireland) Shane Lowry (4)	48		Rolex Series
27 Jan	Omega Dubai Desert Classic	UAE	US$3,250,000	4,250	(United States) Bryson DeChambeau (1)	46		
3 Feb	Saudi International	Saudi Arabia	US$3,500,000	4,250	(United States) Dustin Johnson (n/a)	48		New tournament
10 Feb	ISPS Handa Vic Open	Australia	A$1,500,000	2,000	(Scotland) David Law (1)	20	ANZ	New to European Tour
17 Feb	ISPS Handa World Super 6 Perth	Australia	A$1,600,000	2,000	(New Zealand) Ryan Fox (1)	20	ANZ, ASA	
24 Feb	WGC-Mexico Championship	Mexico	US$10,250,000	9,000	(United States) Dustin Johnson (n/a)	72		World Golf Championship
3 Mar	Oman Open	Oman	US$1,750,000	2,750	(United States) Kurt Kitayama (2)	24		
10 Mar	Commercial Bank Qatar Masters	Qatar	US$1,750,000	2,750	(South Africa) Justin Harding (1)	24		
17 Mar	Magical Kenya Open	Kenya	€1,100,000	2,000	(Italy) Guido Migliozzi (1)	24		New to European Tour
24 Mar	Maybank Championship	Malaysia	US$3,000,000	3,500	(Australia) Scott Hend (3)	24	ASA	
31 Mar	WGC-Dell Technologies Match Play	United States	US$10,250,000	9,000	(United States) Kevin Kisner (1)	76		World Golf Championship
31 Mar	Hero Indian Open	India	US$1,750,000	2,750	(Scotland) Stephen Gallacher (4)	19	ASA	
14 Apr	Masters Tournament	United States	US$11,000,000	10,000	(United States) Tiger Woods (n/a)	100		Major championship
28 Apr	Trophée Hassan II	Morocco	€2,500,000	3,500	(Spain) Jorge Campillo (1)	24		
5 May	Volvo China Open	China	CN¥20,000,000	3,500	(Finland) Mikko Korhonen (2)	24	ASA	
12 May	Betfred British Masters	England	£3,000,000	4,250	(Sweden) Marcus Kinhult (1)	26		
19 May	PGA Championship	United States	US$11,000,000	10,000	(United States) Brooks Koepka (5)	100		Major championship
26 May	Made in Denmark	Denmark	€3,000,000	4,250	(Austria) Bernd Wiesberger (5)	24		
2 Jun	Belgian Knockout	Belgium	€1,000,000	2,000	(Italy) Guido Migliozzi (2)	24		
16 Jun	U.S. Open	United States	US$12,500,000	10,000	(United States) Gary Woodland (n/a)	100		Major championship
23 Jun	BMW International Open	Germany	€2,000,000	2,750	(Italy) Andrea Pavan (2)	26		
30 Jun	Estrella Damm N.A. Andalucía Masters	Spain	€3,000,000	4,250	(South Africa) Christiaan Bezuidenhout (1)	24		
7 Jul	Dubai Duty Free Irish Open	Ireland	US$7,000,000	7,000	(Spain) Jon Rahm (4)	42		Rolex Series
14 Jul	Aberdeen Standard Investments Scottish Open	Scotland	US$7,000,000	7,000	(Austria) Bernd Wiesberger (6)	48		Rolex Series
21 Jul	The Open Championship	Northern Ireland	US$10,750,000	10,000	(Republic of Ireland) Shane Lowry (5)	100		Major championship
28 Jul	WGC-FedEx St. Jude Invitational	United States	US$10,250,000	9,000	(United States) Brooks Koepka (6)	72		World Golf Championship
18 Aug	D+D Real Czech Masters	Czech Republic	€1,000,000	2,000	(Belgium) Thomas Pieters (4)	24		
25 Aug	Scandinavian Invitation	Sweden	€1,500,000	2,750	(South Africa) Erik van Rooyen (1)	24		
1 Sep	Omega European Masters	Switzerland	€2,500,000	3,500	(Sweden) Sebastian Söderberg (1)	38		
8 Sep	Porsche European Open	Germany	€2,000,000	2,750	(England) Paul Casey (14)	26		
15 Sep	KLM Open	Netherlands	€2,000,000	2,750	(Spain) Sergio García (16)	24		
22 Sep	BMW PGA Championship	England	US$7,000,000	7,000	(England) Danny Willett (7)	64		Flagship event (Note: Also a Rolex Series tournament.)
29 Sep	Alfred Dunhill Links Championship	Scotland	US$5,000,000	5,500	(France) Victor Perez (1)	50		Pro-Am
6 Oct	Mutuactivos Open de España	Spain	€1,500,000	2,750	(Spain) Jon Rahm (5)	24		
13 Oct	Italian Open	Italy	US$7,000,000	7,000	(Austria) Bernd Wiesberger (7)	44		Rolex Series
20 Oct	Amundi Open de France	France	€1,600,000	2,750	(Belgium) Nicolas Colsaerts (3)	24		
27 Oct	Portugal Masters	Portugal	€1,500,000	2,750	(England) Steven Brown (1)	24		
3 Nov	WGC-HSBC Champions	China	US$10,250,000	9,000	(Northern Ireland) Rory McIlroy (14)	60		World Golf Championship
10 Nov	Turkish Airlines Open	Turkey	US$7,000,000	9,000	(England) Tyrrell Hatton (4)	42		Rolex Series; Limited-field event
17 Nov	Nedbank Golf Challenge	South Africa	US$7,500,000	10,000	(England) Tommy Fleetwood (5)	36	AFR	Rolex Series; Limited-field event
24 Nov	DP World Tour Championship, Dubai	UAE	US$8,000,000	12,000	(Spain) Jon Rahm (6)	52		Tour Championship

=== Unofficial events ===
The following events were sanctioned by the European Tour, but did not carry official money, nor were wins official.

Date	Tournament	Host country	Purse	Winners	OWGR points	Notes
8 Jun	GolfSixes Cascais	Portugal	€1,000,000	(Thailand) Thongchai Jaidee and (Thailand) Phachara Khongwatmai	n/a	Team event

== Location of tournaments ==
Location of official tournaments of the 2019 European Tour in Europe.
Major Championship
Rolex Series event
Regular event
Location of official tournaments of the 2019 European Tour outside Europe.
Major Championship
World Golf Championship
Rolex Series event
Regular event

South Africa
United Arab Emirates

== Race to Dubai ==
=== Points distribution ===
The distribution of Race to Dubai points for 2019 European Tour events were as follows:

Finishing position	Total pts	1st	2nd	3rd	4th	5th	6th	7th	8th	9th	10th	20th	30th	40th	50th	60th
Major championships & Nedbank Golf Challenge	10,000	1,665	1,113	627	500	424	350	300	250	223	200	120	90	68	48	30
World Golf Championships & Turkish Airlines Open	9,000	1,500	1,000	565	450	381	315	270	225	201	180	108	81	61	43	27
Rolex Series	7,000	1,165	780	438	350	297	245	210	175	156	140	84	63	47	33	21
Regular tournament (Band 6) (Note: Tournaments with purses ranging from $5,000,000 to $5,499,999.)	5,500	915	612	345	275	234	192	165	138	123	110	66	50	37	28	17
Regular tournament (Band 4) (Note: Tournaments with purses ranging from $3,250,000 to $3,999,999.)	4,250	710	472	266	212	180	149	128	106	95	85	51	38	29	20	13
Regular tournament (Band 3) (Note: Tournaments with purses ranging from $2,500,000 to $3,249,999.)	3,500	585	389	218	175	148	123	105	88	78	70	42	32	24	17	11
Regular tournament (Band 2) (Note: Tournaments with purses ranging from $1,750,000 to $2,499,999.)	2,750	460	305	172	137	116	97	83	69	61	55	33	25	19	13	8
Regular tournament (Band 1) (Note: Tournaments with purses ranging from $1,000,000 to $1,749,999.)	2,000	335	222	125	100	84	70	60	50	44	40	24	18	14	10	6
DP World Tour Championship	12,000	2,000	1,335	752	600	509	420	359	300	267	240	144	108	82	58	36

=== Final standings ===
The Race to Dubai was based on tournament results during the season, calculated using a points-based system.

Pos.	Player	Majors				WGCs				Rolex Series								Top 10s in other ET events					Total pts	Tmts	Money (Note: In addition to tournament prize money, the top five point scorers received a share of a $5m bonus pool.)	
Pos.	Player	Mas	PGA	USO	Opn	WGC Mex	WGC MP	WGC Inv	WGC Cha	Abu	Ire	Sco	BMW PGA	Ita	Tur	Ned	DPW TC	1	2	3	4	5	Total pts	Tmts	Reg. (€m)	Bon. ($m)
1	(Spain) Rahm	T9; 202	CUT; 0	T3; 475	T11; 163	T45; 49	T24; 79	7th 270	•	•	1st 1165	•	2nd 780	•	•	•	1st 2000	T2; 256	1st 460				5,898	13	6.2	2.0
2	(England) Fleetwood	T36; 73	T48; 47	T65; 25	2nd 1113	T19; 104	T24; 78	T4; 382	T53; 35	T42; 41	T23; 75	•	T60; 20	•	•	1st 1665	2nd 1335	T8; 81	T8; 75	T5; 170			5,415	18	5.2	1.2
3	(Austria) Wiesberger	•	•	76th 17	T32; 76	•	•	•	T49; 42	T42; 41	T2; 609	1st 1165	T17; 89	1st 1165	49th 45	T3; 517	T28; 104	1st 710	8th 50	5th 116			4,906	29	4.0	0.7
4	(Republic of Ireland) Lowry	CUT; 0	T8; 198	T28; 94	1st 1665	T62; 24	T24; 79	•	T43; 54	1st 1165	T34; 52	•	T11; 120	CUT; 0	62nd 24	•	T12; 200						3,614	14	3.6	0.6
5	(England) Fitzpatrick	T21; 107	T41; 60	T12; 162	T20; 107	T19; 82	T24; 25	T4; 382	7th 270	•	•	T14; 97	T46; 36	2nd 780	•	T10; 185	9th 267	2nd 305	2nd 305	2nd 305			3,588	20	2.8	0.5
6	(Northern Ireland) McIlroy (Note: McIlroy was not a European Tour member during the WGC-Mexico Championship, WGC-Dell Technologies Match Play and the Masters Tournament. Points he earned in these events did not count towards his Race to Dubai ranking.)	T21; ~~107~~	T8; 198	T9; 202	CUT; 0	2nd ~~1000~~	T9; ~~155~~	T4; 382	1st 1500	•	•	T34; 50	T9; 148	•	•	•	4th 600	T2; 233					3,364	13	3.1	
7	(England) Wallace	CUT; 0	T3; 517	T12; 162	T51; 41	T33; 72	T40; 48	T27; 76	T60; 25	T16; 89	T55; 24	T14; 96	T41; 43	T7; 180	50th 41	T44; 57	T28; 104	2nd 472	T2; 317	T3; 105	3rd 172	T8; 55	2,851	27	2.4	
8	(South Africa) Oosthuizen	T29; 90	T60; 28	T7; 275	T20; 106	T25; 93	T5; 298	T20; 104	3rd 565	4th 350	T46; 37	•	•	•	•	T6; 325	T20; 131	1st 335	T7; 76				2,814	14	2.3	
9	(England) Hatton	T56; 41	T48; 47	T21; 111	T6; 281	T19; 104	T9; 155	T43; 52	T14; 143	CUT; 0	CUT; 0	T14; 97	CUT; 0	T18; 83	1st 1500	•	46th 67						2,799	18	2.9	
10	(South Africa) van Rooyen	•	T8; 198	T43; 61	T20; 107	T36; 67	•	•	T38; 61	T32; 53	CUT; 0	T14; 97	T14; 103	T10; 122	T2; 542	T30; 80	T28; 104	T2; 122	T6; 77	T2; 261	T5; 62	1st 460	2,766	29	2.0	

Win
Top 10
Made cut
Missed cut
• Did not play

== Awards ==
Award	Winner	Ref.
Golfer of the Year	(Spain) Jon Rahm	
Players' Player of the Year (Seve Ballesteros Award)	(Spain) Jon Rahm	
Sir Henry Cotton Rookie of the Year	(Scotland) Robert MacIntyre	
Graduate of the Year	(Scotland) Robert MacIntyre	

== See also ==
- 2018 in golf
- 2019 in golf
- 2019 Challenge Tour
- 2019 European Senior Tour
- 2019 Ladies European Tour
