= Dubai Desert Classic =

European Tour golf tournament

Coordinates: 25.086°N 55.161°E

Hero Dubai Desert Classic
Tournament information
- Location: Dubai, United Arab Emirates
- Established: 1989
- Course: Emirates Golf Club
- Par: 72
- Length: 7,428 yards (6,792 m)
- Tour: European Tour
- Format: Stroke play
- Prize fund: US$9,000,000
- Month played: January

Tournament record score
- Aggregate: 264 Bryson DeChambeau
- To par: −24 as above

Current champion
- (United States) Patrick Reed

Final champion
- Location in the United Arab Emirates

The Dubai Desert Classic is a European Tour golf tournament held on the Majlis course at Emirates Golf Club in Dubai, United Arab Emirates. In 1999 and 2000 it was held at Dubai Creek Golf & Yacht Club.

== History ==
When founded in 1989, it was the first European Tour event to be staged in the Arabian Peninsula. It is now one of six.

The tournament is part of a wider strategy, via a government program called "Dubai Golf", to develop both professional and casual golf tourism in Dubai. It has historically had one of the strongest fields on the European Tour due to "promotional" money paid to top golfers.

The 1995 edition is notable as the first live event broadcast on the Golf Channel, an American pay-television network.

In September 2021, it was announced that the event would gain a new title sponsor, Slync.io, in 2022. The event was also added to the Rolex Series, with an increased prize fund of US$8,000,000. The deal was terminated in September 2022.

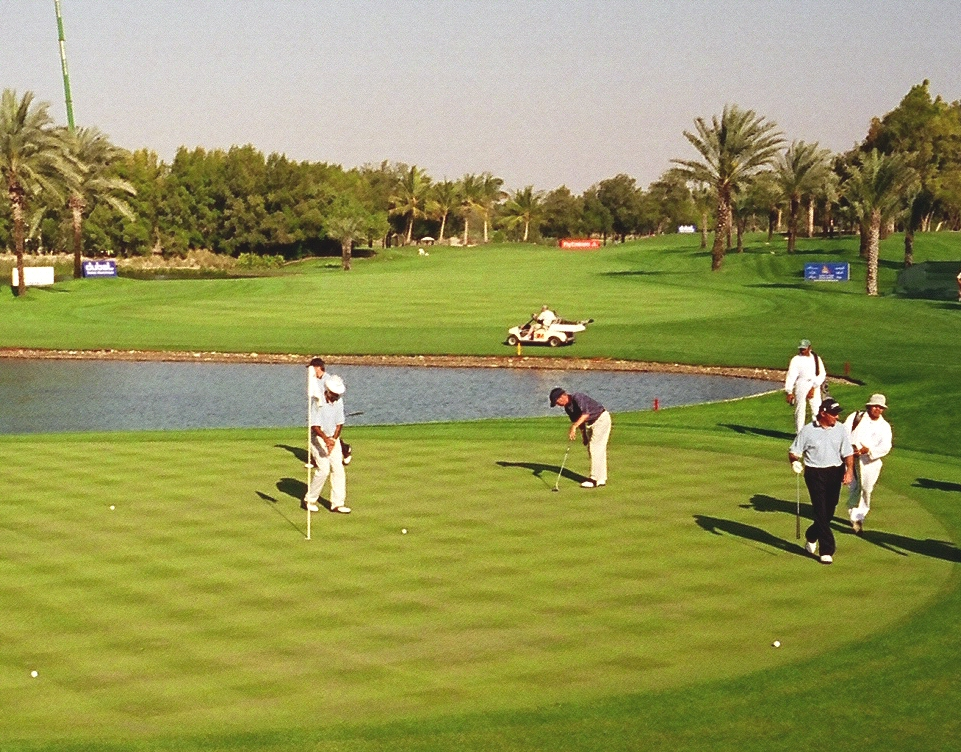
Emirates Golf Club

In January 2023, it was confirmed that Hero MotoCorp would become the event's new title sponsor beginning in 2023.

== Winners ==
European Tour (Rolex Series)	2022–
European Tour (Regular)	1989–2021

#	Year	Winner	Score	To par	Margin of victory	Runner(s)-up	Purse (US$)	Winner's share ($)
Hero Dubai Desert Classic
37th	2026	(United States) Patrick Reed	274	−14	4 strokes	(England) Andy Sullivan	9,000,000	1,530,000
36th	2025	(England) Tyrrell Hatton	273	−15	1 stroke	(New Zealand) Daniel Hillier	9,000,000	1,530,000
35th	2024	(Northern Ireland) Rory McIlroy (4)	274	−14	1 stroke	(Poland) Adrian Meronk	9,000,000	1,530,000
34th	2023	(Northern Ireland) Rory McIlroy (3)	269	−19	1 stroke	(United States) Patrick Reed	9,000,000	1,530,000
Slync.io Dubai Desert Classic
33rd	2022	(Norway) Viktor Hovland	276	−12	Playoff	(England) Richard Bland	8,000,000	1,333,330
Omega Dubai Desert Classic
32nd	2021	(England) Paul Casey	271	−17	4 strokes	(South Africa) Brandon Stone	3,250,000	528,514
31st	2020	(Australia) Lucas Herbert	279	−9	Playoff	(South Africa) Christiaan Bezuidenhout	3,250,000	541,660
30th	2019	(United States) Bryson DeChambeau	264	−24	7 strokes	(England) Matt Wallace	3,250,000	541,660
29th	2018	(China) Li Haotong	265	−23	1 stroke	(Northern Ireland) Rory McIlroy	3,000,000	500,100
28th	2017	(Spain) Sergio García	269	−19	3 strokes	(Sweden) Henrik Stenson	2,650,000	441,755
27th	2016	(England) Danny Willett	269	−19	1 stroke	(Spain) Rafa Cabrera-Bello (England) Andy Sullivan	2,650,000	441,755
26th	2015	(Northern Ireland) Rory McIlroy (2)	266	−22	3 strokes	(Sweden) Alex Norén	2,650,000	441,755
25th	2014	(Scotland) Stephen Gallacher (2)	272	−16	1 stroke	(Argentina) Emiliano Grillo	2,500,000	416,750
24th	2013	(Scotland) Stephen Gallacher	266	−22	3 strokes	(South Africa) Richard Sterne	2,500,000	416,750
23rd	2012	(Spain) Rafa Cabrera-Bello	270	−18	1 stroke	(Scotland) Stephen Gallacher (England) Lee Westwood	2,500,000	416,750
22nd	2011	(Spain) Álvaro Quirós	277	−11	1 stroke	(Denmark) Anders Hansen (South Africa) James Kingston	2,500,000	416,750
21st	2010	(Spain) Miguel Ángel Jiménez	277	−11	Playoff	(England) Lee Westwood	2,500,000	416,750
Dubai Desert Classic
20th	2009	(Northern Ireland) Rory McIlroy	269	−19	1 stroke	(England) Justin Rose	2,500,000	416,750
19th	2008	(United States) Tiger Woods (2)	274	−14	1 stroke	(Germany) Martin Kaymer	2,500,000	416,750
18th	2007	(Sweden) Henrik Stenson	269	−19	1 stroke	(South Africa) Ernie Els	2,400,000	309,862
17th	2006	(United States) Tiger Woods	269	−19	Playoff	(South Africa) Ernie Els	2,400,000	309,862
16th	2005	(South Africa) Ernie Els (3)	269	−19	1 stroke	(Wales) Stephen Dodd (Spain) Miguel Ángel Jiménez	2,200,000	366,667
15th	2004	(United States) Mark O'Meara	271	−17	1 stroke	(Republic of Ireland) Paul McGinley	2,000,000	333,333
14th	2003	(Netherlands) Robert-Jan Derksen	271	−17	1 stroke	(South Africa) Ernie Els	2,000,000	333,333
13th	2002	(South Africa) Ernie Els (2)	272	−16	4 strokes	(Sweden) Niclas Fasth	1,500,000	250,000
12th	2001	(Denmark) Thomas Bjørn	266	−22	2 strokes	(Republic of Ireland) Pádraig Harrington (United States) Tiger Woods	1,500,000	250,000
11th	2000	(Argentina) José Cóceres	274	−14	2 strokes	(Republic of Ireland) Paul McGinley (Sweden) Patrik Sjöland	1,300,000	216,667
10th	1999	(England) David Howell	275	−13	4 strokes	(England) Lee Westwood	1,300,000	216,667
9th	1998	(Spain) José María Olazábal	269	−19	3 strokes	(Australia) Stephen Allan	1,300,000	216,667
8th	1997	(Australia) Richard Green	272	−16	Playoff	(Australia) Greg Norman (Wales) Ian Woosnam	1,200,000	200,000
7th	1996	(Scotland) Colin Montgomerie	270	−18	1 stroke	(Spain) Miguel Ángel Jiménez	1,000,000	166,667
6th	1995	(United States) Fred Couples	268	−20	3 strokes	(Scotland) Colin Montgomerie	700,000	116,667
5th	1994	(South Africa) Ernie Els	268	−20	6 strokes	(Australia) Greg Norman	700,000	116,667
4th	1993	(South Africa) Wayne Westner	274	−14	2 strokes	(South Africa) Retief Goosen	500,000	83,333
3rd	1992	(Spain) Seve Ballesteros	272	−16	Playoff	(Northern Ireland) Ronan Rafferty	650,000	108,333
–	1991	Cancelled due to the Gulf War						
Emirates Airlines Desert Classic
2nd	1990	(Republic of Ireland) Eamonn Darcy	276	−12	4 strokes	(Northern Ireland) David Feherty	450,000	75,000
Karl Litten Desert Classic
1st	1989	(England) Mark James	277	−11	Playoff	(Australia) Peter O'Malley	450,000	75,000
