= 2016 European Tour =

Golf tour season

2016 European Tour season
- Duration: 26 November 2015 – 20 November 2016
- Number of official events: 47
- Most wins: (Sweden) Alex Norén (4)
- Race to Dubai: (Sweden) Henrik Stenson
- Golfer of the Year: (Sweden) Henrik Stenson
- Players' Player of the Year: (Sweden) Henrik Stenson
- Sir Henry Cotton Rookie of the Year: (South Korea) Wang Jeung-hun
- Graduate of the Year: (Spain) Nacho Elvira

The 2016 European Tour was the 45th season of the European Tour, the main professional golf tour in Europe since its inaugural season in 1972.

== Changes for 2016 ==
=== Rule changes ===
For the 2016 season, the European Tour modified its membership requirements from 13 tournaments inclusive of the four majors and four World Golf Championships, to 5 tournaments exclusive of them; the change was intended to make it easier for United States-based players outside the top-50 in the OWGR to retain their membership, as they may not be eligible for the majors and WGCs.

=== Schedule changes ===
There were many changes from the previous season. Seven tournaments were lost from the schedule, the most significant being the WGC-Bridgestone Invitational which, due to a clash of dates with the 100th edition of the Open de France, was not sanctioned by the European Tour in 2016. Other tournaments which were removed were the Africa Open, the Malaysian Open, the Madeira Islands Open, the Russian Open, the BMW Masters and the Hong Kong Open, which would take place early in the 2017 season due to a change in dates from October to December. There were four additions to the schedule: the return of the Perth International, the first European Tour sanctioned Australian PGA Championship; the inaugural Maybank Championship, which replaced the Malaysian Open; and the Olympic Men's Golf Competition.

The Final Series was also adjusted; the Nedbank Golf Challenge replaced the dropped BMW Masters, and the series was reduced to three events with the removal of the WGC-HSBC Champions. As a result of the change of dates, the Nedbank Golf Challenge was played twice during the season.

The Fiji International and the King's Cup were added to the schedule during the year.

== Schedule ==
The following table lists official events during the 2016 season.

Date	Tournament	Host country	Purse	Winner (Note: The number in brackets after each winner's name is the number of European Tour events they had won up to and including that tournament. This information is only shown for European Tour members.)	OWGR points	Other tours (Note: AFR − Sunshine Tour; ANZ − PGA Tour of Australasia; ASA − Asian Tour; ONE − OneAsia Tour.)	Notes
29 Nov	Alfred Dunhill Championship	South Africa	€1,500,000	(South Africa) Charl Schwartzel (10)	22	AFR	
6 Dec	Australian PGA Championship	Australia	A$1,750,000	(Australia) Nathan Holman (1)	20	ANZ	New to European Tour
6 Dec	Nedbank Golf Challenge	South Africa	US$6,500,000	(Australia) Marc Leishman (n/a)	44	AFR	Limited-field event
10 Jan	BMW SA Open	South Africa	R15,000,000	(South Africa) Brandon Stone (1)	32	AFR (Note: Sunshine Tour flagship event)	
17 Jan	Joburg Open	South Africa	R16,500,000	(South Africa) Haydn Porteous (1)	19	AFR	
24 Jan	Abu Dhabi HSBC Golf Championship	UAE	US$2,700,000	(United States) Rickie Fowler (n/a)	52		
30 Jan	Commercial Bank Qatar Masters	Qatar	US$2,500,000	(South Africa) Branden Grace (7)	36		
7 Feb	Omega Dubai Desert Classic	UAE	US$2,650,000	(England) Danny Willett (4)	48		
14 Feb	Tshwane Open	South Africa	R18,500,000	(South Africa) Charl Schwartzel (11)	19	AFR	
21 Feb	Maybank Championship Malaysia	Malaysia	US$3,000,000	(Australia) Marcus Fraser (3)	38	ASA	New tournament
28 Feb	ISPS Handa Perth International	Australia	A$1,750,000	(South Africa) Louis Oosthuizen (8)	23	ANZ, ASA	
6 Mar	WGC-Cadillac Championship	United States	US$9,500,000	(Australia) Adam Scott (10)	76		World Golf Championship
13 Mar	True Thailand Classic	Thailand	US$1,750,000	(Australia) Scott Hend (2)	24	ASA	
20 Mar	Hero Indian Open	India	US$1,660,000	(India) Shiv Chawrasia (3)	19	ASA	
27 Mar	WGC-Dell Match Play	United States	US$9,500,000	(Australia) Jason Day (n/a)	76		World Golf Championship
10 Apr	Masters Tournament	United States	US$10,000,000	(England) Danny Willett (5)	100		Major championship
17 Apr	Real Club Valderrama Open de España	Spain	€2,000,000	(England) Andrew Johnston (1)	28		
25 Apr	Shenzhen International	China	US$2,800,000	(South Korea) Lee Soo-min (1)	24		
1 May	Volvo China Open	China	CN¥20,000,000	(China) Li Haotong (1)	26	ONE	
8 May	Trophée Hassan II	Morocco	€1,500,000	(South Korea) Wang Jeung-hun (1)	24		
15 May	AfrAsia Bank Mauritius Open	Mauritius	€1,000,000	(South Korea) Wang Jeung-hun (2)	17	AFR, ASA	
22 May	Dubai Duty Free Irish Open	Ireland	€4,000,000	(Northern Ireland) Rory McIlroy (13)	46		
29 May	BMW PGA Championship	England	€5,000,000	(England) Chris Wood (3)	64		Flagship event
5 Jun	Nordea Masters	Sweden	€1,500,000	(England) Matt Fitzpatrick (2)	24		
12 Jun	Lyoness Open	Austria	€1,000,000	(China) Wu Ashun (2)	24		
19 Jun	U.S. Open	United States	US$10,000,000	(United States) Dustin Johnson (n/a)	100		Major championship
26 Jun	BMW International Open	Germany	€2,000,000	(Sweden) Henrik Stenson (10)	34		
3 Jul	Open de France	France	€3,500,000	(Thailand) Thongchai Jaidee (8)	42		
10 Jul	Aberdeen Asset Management Scottish Open	Scotland	£3,250,000	(Sweden) Alex Norén (5)	46		
17 Jul	The Open Championship	Scotland	£6,500,000	(Sweden) Henrik Stenson (11)	100		Major championship
31 Jul	King's Cup	Thailand	US$750,000	(Taiwan) Chan Shih-chang (1)	14	ASA	New to European Tour
31 Jul	PGA Championship	United States	US$10,500,000	(United States) Jimmy Walker (n/a)	100		Major championship
7 Aug	Aberdeen Asset Management Paul Lawrie Match Play	Scotland	€1,000,000	(England) Anthony Wall (2)	24		Limited-field event
21 Aug	D+D Real Czech Masters	Czech Republic	€1,000,000	(United States) Paul Peterson (1)	24		
28 Aug	Made in Denmark	Denmark	€1,800,000	(Belgium) Thomas Pieters (3)	24		
4 Sep	Omega European Masters	Switzerland	€2,700,000	(Sweden) Alex Norén (6)	30	ASA	
11 Sep	KLM Open	Netherlands	€1,800,000	(Netherlands) Joost Luiten (5)	24		
18 Sep	Italian Open	Italy	€3,000,000	(Italy) Francesco Molinari (4)	36		
25 Sep	Porsche European Open	Germany	€2,000,000	(France) Alexander Lévy (3)	24		
9 Oct	Fiji International	Fiji	A$1,500,000	(United States) Brandt Snedeker (n/a)	16	ANZ	New to European Tour
9 Oct	Alfred Dunhill Links Championship	Scotland	US$5,000,000	(England) Tyrrell Hatton (1)	40		Pro-Am
16 Oct	British Masters	England	£3,000,000	(Sweden) Alex Norén (7)	34		
23 Oct	Portugal Masters	Portugal	€2,000,000	(Republic of Ireland) Pádraig Harrington (15)	24		
30 Oct	WGC-HSBC Champions	China	US$9,500,000	(Japan) Hideki Matsuyama (n/a)	70		World Golf Championship
6 Nov	Turkish Airlines Open	Turkey	US$7,000,000	(Denmark) Thorbjørn Olesen (4)	30		Race to Dubai finals series
13 Nov	Nedbank Golf Challenge	South Africa	US$7,000,000	(Sweden) Alex Norén (8)	46		Race to Dubai finals series
20 Nov	DP World Tour Championship, Dubai	UAE	US$8,000,000	(England) Matt Fitzpatrick (3)	52		Race to Dubai finals series

=== Unofficial events ===
The following events were sanctioned by the European Tour, but did not carry official money, nor were wins official.

Date	Tournament	Host country	Purse	Winner(s)	OWGR points	Notes
17 Jan	EurAsia Cup	Malaysia	n/a	Team Europe	n/a	Team event
14 Aug	Olympic Games	Brazil	n/a	Justin Rose (Note: Originally the European Tour counted this as Rose's 9th official win, but the Olympic Games tournament has been retrospectively reclassified as an approved special event.)	46	Limited-field event
2 Oct	Ryder Cup	United States	n/a	Team USA	n/a	Team event
27 Nov	ISPS Handa World Cup of Golf	Australia	US$8,000,000	(Denmark) Søren Kjeldsen and (Denmark) Thorbjørn Olesen	n/a	Team event

== Location of tournaments ==
Location of official tournaments of the 2016 European Tour in Europe.
Major Championship
Flagship event
Final Series event
Regular event
Location of official tournaments of the 2016 European Tour outside Europe.
Major Championship
World Golf Championship
Final Series event
Regular event

South Africa
United Arab Emirates

== Race to Dubai ==
The Race to Dubai was based on tournament results during the season, calculated using a points-based system.

Pos.	Player	Majors				WGCs (Note: The 2016 WGC-Bridgestone Invitational was not sanctioned by the European Tour due to a scheduling clash with the Open de France.)			Flagship event and R2D finals series				Top 10s in other ET events							Tmts	Points and money (Note: In addition to tournament prize money, the top 10 point scorers received a share of a $5m bonus pool.)		
Pos.	Player	Mas	USO	Opn	PGA	WGC Cad	WGC MP	WGC Cha	BMW PGA	Tur	Ned	DPW TC	1	2	3	4	5	6	7	Tmts	Reg. points	Bon. ($)	Total points
1	(Sweden) Stenson	T24	WD	1st	T7	T28	•	T2	•	•	8th	T9	T2	T3	T6	T4	1st			15	4,148,402	1,250,000	5,289,506
2	(England) Willett	1st	T37	T53	T79	T3	T28	75th	3rd	T68	T11	T50	T4	1st	2nd					22	3,734,528	750,000	4,419,190
3	(Sweden) Norén	•	CUT	T46	T49	•	•	T12	T43	•	1st	T23	T6	T9	8th	1st	2nd	1st	1st	22	3,447,323	600,000	3,995,053
4	(England) Hatton	•	•	T5	T10	•	•	T23	T7	T10	T25	2nd	T8	T5	2nd	1st	T9			23	3,233,586	500,000	3,690,027
5	(Northern Ireland) McIlroy	T10	CUT	T5	CUT	T3	4th	T4	•	•	•	T9	T3	T6	1st	3rd				12	2,971,988	400,000	3,337,141
6	(England) Fitzpatrick	T7	T54	CUT	T49	T35	T38	T16	T47	•	T20	1st	1st	T9	5th	T7				26	2,395,788	350,000	2,715,297
7	(South Africa) Grace	CUT	T5	T72	T4	T23	T18	T30	•	•	T3	T27	T8	T4	T4	T5	1st			16	2,098,915	325,000	2,395,602
8	(Spain) Cabrera-Bello	T17	T32	T39	T49	T11	3rd	T19	T22	•	T55	T23	T2	T2	T8	4th				21	2,069,184	300,000	2,343,049
9	(Austria) Wiesberger	T34	CUT	CUT	CUT	T14	T51	T35	T15	4th	•	T4	T7	2nd	5th	T7	2nd			25	2,015,865	275,000	2,266,907
10	(South Africa) Oosthuizen	T15	T23	CUT	T22	T14	2nd	T45	•	•	9th	T46	T7	1st						16	1,938,370	250,000	2,166,590

Win
Top 10
Made cut
Missed cut
Withdrew
• Did not play

== Awards ==
Award	Winner	Ref.
Golfer of the Year	(Sweden) Henrik Stenson	
Players' Player of the Year (Seve Ballesteros Award)	(Sweden) Henrik Stenson	
Sir Henry Cotton Rookie of the Year	(South Korea) Wang Jeung-hun	
Graduate of the Year	(Spain) Nacho Elvira	

== See also ==
- 2015 in golf
- 2016 in golf
- 2016 Challenge Tour
- 2016 European Senior Tour
