= Paul Lawrie Matchplay =

Coordinates: 48.409°N 13.193°E

Paul Lawrie Match Play

Tournament information
- Location: Bad Griesbach, Germany
- Established: 2015
- Course: Golf Resort Bad Griesbach
- Par: 71
- Length: 7,188 yards (6,573 m)
- Tour: European Tour
- Format: Match play
- Prize fund: €1,000,000
- Month played: August
- Final year: 2017

Tournament record score
- Score: 2 and 1 Adrián Otaegui (2017)

Final champion
- (Spain) Adrián Otaegui
- Location in Germany Location in Bavaria

The Paul Lawrie Match Play was a golf tournament on the European Tour that was played from 2015 to 2017 in Europe. The inaugural tournament was played from 30 July to 2 August 2015 at Murcar Links Golf Club in Aberdeen. The tournament's host was eight-time European Tour winner and 1999 Open Champion Paul Lawrie.

The event was a 64-man single-elimination match play tournament, with one round played on each of the first two days and two rounds on the last two. The European Tour's exemption categories were used to select most of the field, with four spots reserved for invitations and three for the leading three non-exempt players in the Race to Dubai rankings. The thirty-two players in the field who were highest in the Race to Dubai were seeded one to thirty-two and prevented from facing each other in the first round; the remainder were randomly drawn into the bracket.

After changing title sponsor every year and relocating from Scotland to Germany in 2017, the tournament was quietly dropped from 2018 European Tour calendar probably due to financial reasons.

== Winners ==
Year	Winner	Score	Runner-up	Venue
Saltire Energy Paul Lawrie Match Play
2017	(Spain) Adrián Otaegui	2 and 1	(Germany) Marcel Siem	Bad Griesbach, Bad Griesbach
Aberdeen Asset Management Paul Lawrie Match Play
2016	(England) Anthony Wall	1 up	(Sweden) Alex Norén	Archerfield Links, North Berwick
Saltire Energy Paul Lawrie Match Play
2015	(Thailand) Kiradech Aphibarnrat	1 up	(Sweden) Robert Karlsson	Murcar Links, Aberdeen
