= Maybank Championship =

Coordinates: 3.106°N 101.575°E

Tournament information
- Location: Kuala Lumpur, Malaysia
- Established: 2016
- Course: Saujana Golf and Country Club
- Par: 72
- Length: 7,135 yards (6,524 m)
- Tours: Asian Tour; European Tour
- Format: Stroke play
- Prize fund: US$3,000,000
- Month played: March
- Final year: 2019

Tournament record score
- Aggregate: 267 Shubhankar Sharma (2018)
- To par: −21 as above

Final champion
- (Australia) Scott Hend
- Location in Malaysia

The Maybank Championship was a professional golf tournament, co-sanctioned by the Asian Tour and the European Tour, that was played annually in Malaysia. The tournament was founded in 2016 by sponsors Maybank, who had previously sponsored the Malaysian Open, with the inaugural tournament played from 18–21 February at Royal Selangor Golf Club in Kuala Lumpur. It had a purse of US$3,000,000.

Since 2017 the Maybank Championship was played at Saujana Golf and Country Club in Kuala Lumpur.

== Winners ==
Year	Tours (Note: ASA − Asian Tour; EUR − European Tour.)	Winner	Score	To par	Margin of victory	Runner(s)-up	Venue
Maybank Championship
2020	ASA, EUR	Cancelled due to the COVID-19 pandemic					
2019	ASA, EUR	(Australia) Scott Hend	273	−15	Playoff	(Spain) Nacho Elvira	Saujana
2018	ASA, EUR	(India) Shubhankar Sharma	267	−21	2 strokes	(Spain) Jorge Campillo	Saujana
2017	ASA, EUR	(Paraguay) Fabrizio Zanotti	269	−19	1 stroke	(United States) David Lipsky	Saujana
Maybank Championship Malaysia
2016	ASA, EUR	(Australia) Marcus Fraser	269	−15	2 strokes	(South Korea) Lee Soo-min (Philippines) Miguel Tabuena	Royal Selangor
