= D+D Real Czech Masters =

Coordinates: 49.995°N 14.201°E

Tournament information
- Location: Prague, Czech Republic
- Established: 2014
- Course: PGA National Oaks Prague
- Par: 72
- Length: 7,592 yards (6,942 m)
- Tour: European Tour
- Format: Stroke play
- Prize fund: US$2,500,000
- Month played: August

Tournament record score
- Aggregate: 265 David Ravetto (2024)
- To par: −23 as above

Current champion
- (France) David Ravetto

Final champion
- Location in the Czech Republic

The D+D Real Czech Masters is a European Tour golf tournament played annually in the Czech Republic. The inaugural tournament was played from 21 to 24 August 2014 at the Albatross Golf Club in Prague.

== Winners ==
Year	Winner	Score	To par	Margin of victory	Runner(s)-up	Ref.
2025	Cancelled					
2024	(France) David Ravetto	265	−23	4 strokes	(Sweden) Jesper Svensson	
2023	(England) Todd Clements	266	−22	1 stroke	(England) Matt Wallace	
2022	(Germany) Maximilian Kieffer	200 (Note: Shortened to 54 holes due to weather.)	−16	1 stroke	(Malaysia) Gavin Green	
2021	(United States) Johannes Veerman	273	−15	2 strokes	(United States) Sean Crocker (Finland) Tapio Pulkkanen	
2020	Cancelled due to the COVID-19 pandemic					
2019	(Belgium) Thomas Pieters (2)	269	−19	1 stroke	(Spain) Adri Arnaus	
2018	(Italy) Andrea Pavan	266	−22	2 strokes	(Republic of Ireland) Pádraig Harrington	
2017	(South Africa) Haydn Porteous	275	−13	2 strokes	(England) Lee Slattery	
2016	(United States) Paul Peterson	273	−15	1 stroke	(Belgium) Thomas Pieters	
2015	(Belgium) Thomas Pieters	268	−20	3 strokes	(Sweden) Pelle Edberg	
2014	(Wales) Jamie Donaldson	274	−14	2 strokes	(Wales) Bradley Dredge	
