= Rolex Series (golf) =

Golf tournament series

Tournament information
- Location: International
- Established: 2017
- Tour: European Tour
- Format: Stroke play

Tournament record score
- Aggregate: 260 Brandon Stone (2018)
- To par: −25 Tommy Fleetwood (2025) −25 Aaron Rai (2025)

The Rolex Series is a series of men's professional golf tournaments played internationally, as part of the European Tour.

== History ==
The series was unveiled for the 2017 season and began with eight events, all with elevated purses in comparison with regular events on the European Tour. The minimum purse for each event was US$7,000,000, with the DP World Tour Championship, Dubai having an $8 million purse.

The inaugural events as part of the series were:

- BMW PGA Championship
- HNA Open de France
- Dubai Duty Free Irish Open
- Genesis Scottish Open
- Italian Open
- The three limited-field no-cut events at the end of the season, which had previously been collectively known as the Final Series:
  - Turkish Airlines Open
  - Nedbank Golf Challenge
  - DP World Tour Championship, Dubai

From the 2019 season onwards, the Abu Dhabi HSBC Championship became a designated Rolex Series event and the Open de France was relegated to a regular tour event. In 2020, the season was severely impacted by the COVID-19 pandemic; as a result, the Turkish Airlines Open and the Nedbank Golf Challenge were cancelled, and the Irish and Italian Opens were downgraded to regular events.

In 2021, the Rolex Series was reduced to four tournaments; the Abu Dhabi HSBC Championship, the Scottish Open, the BMW PGA Championship and the season-ending DP World Tour Championship, Dubai. The four events did have increased prize funds up to $8 million however. The Dubai Desert Classic was added to the series for the 2022 season.

In 2023, all Rolex Series purses were increased to $9 million.

== 2017 season ==
=== Schedule ===
Date	Tournament	Winner	Score	To par	Margin of victory	Runner(s)-up	Ref.
28 May	BMW PGA Championship	(Sweden) Alex Norén	277	−11	2 strokes	(Italy) Francesco Molinari	
2 Jul	HNA Open de France	(England) Tommy Fleetwood	272	−12	1 stroke	(United States) Peter Uihlein	
9 Jul	Dubai Duty Free Irish Open	(Spain) Jon Rahm	264	−24	6 strokes	(Scotland) Richie Ramsay (England) Matthew Southgate	
16 Jul	Aberdeen Asset Management Scottish Open	(Spain) Rafa Cabrera-Bello	275	−13	Playoff	(England) Callum Shinkwin	
15 Oct	Italian Open	(England) Tyrrell Hatton	263	−21	1 stroke	(Thailand) Kiradech Aphibarnrat (England) Ross Fisher	
5 Nov	Turkish Airlines Open	(England) Justin Rose	266	−18	1 stroke	(Belgium) Nicolas Colsaerts (South Africa) Dylan Frittelli	
12 Nov	Nedbank Golf Challenge	(South Africa) Branden Grace	277	−11	1 stroke	(Scotland) Scott Jamieson	
19 Nov	DP World Tour Championship, Dubai	(Spain) Jon Rahm	269	−19	1 stroke	(Thailand) Kiradech Aphibarnrat (Republic of Ireland) Shane Lowry	

== 2018 season ==
=== Schedule ===
Date	Tournament	Winner	Score	To par	Margin of victory	Runner(s)-up	Ref.
27 May	BMW PGA Championship	(Italy) Francesco Molinari	271	−17	2 strokes	(Northern Ireland) Rory McIlroy	
3 Jun	Italian Open	(Denmark) Thorbjørn Olesen	262	−22	1 stroke	(Italy) Francesco Molinari	
1 Jul	HNA Open de France	(Sweden) Alex Norén	277	−7	1 stroke	(Scotland) Russell Knox (United States) Julian Suri (England) Chris Wood	
8 Jul	Dubai Duty Free Irish Open	(Scotland) Russell Knox	274	−14	Playoff	(New Zealand) Ryan Fox	
15 Jul	Aberdeen Standard Investments Scottish Open	(South Africa) Brandon Stone	260	−20	4 strokes	(England) Eddie Pepperell	
4 Nov	Turkish Airlines Open	(England) Justin Rose	267	−17	Playoff	(China) Li Haotong	
11 Nov	Nedbank Golf Challenge	(England) Lee Westwood	273	−15	3 strokes	(Spain) Sergio García	
18 Nov	DP World Tour Championship, Dubai	(England) Danny Willett	270	−18	2 strokes	(United States) Patrick Reed (England) Matt Wallace	

== 2019 season ==
=== Schedule ===
Date	Tournament	Winner	Score	To par	Margin of victory	Runner(s)-up	Ref.
19 Jan	Abu Dhabi HSBC Championship	(Republic of Ireland) Shane Lowry	270	−18	1 stroke	(South Africa) Richard Sterne	
7 Jul	Dubai Duty Free Irish Open	(Spain) Jon Rahm	264	−16	2 strokes	(England) Andy Sullivan (Austria) Bernd Wiesberger	
14 Jul	Aberdeen Standard Investments Scottish Open	(Austria) Bernd Wiesberger	262	−22	Playoff	(France) Benjamin Hébert	
22 Sep	BMW PGA Championship	(England) Danny Willett	268	−20	3 strokes	(Spain) Jon Rahm	
13 Oct	Italian Open	(Austria) Bernd Wiesberger	268	−16	1 stroke	(England) Matt Fitzpatrick	
10 Nov	Turkish Airlines Open	(England) Tyrrell Hatton	268	−20	Playoff	(France) Benjamin Hébert (United States) Kurt Kitayama (France) Victor Perez (Austria) Matthias Schwab (South Africa) Erik van Rooyen	
17 Nov	Nedbank Golf Challenge	(England) Tommy Fleetwood	276	−12	Playoff	(Sweden) Marcus Kinhult	
24 Nov	DP World Tour Championship, Dubai	(Spain) Jon Rahm	269	−19	1 stroke	(England) Tommy Fleetwood	

== 2020 season ==
=== Schedule ===
Date	Tournament	Winner	Score	To par	Margin of victory	Runner(s)-up	Ref.
19 Jan	Abu Dhabi HSBC Championship	(England) Lee Westwood	269	−19	2 strokes	(England) Matt Fitzpatrick (England) Tommy Fleetwood (France) Victor Perez	
~~31 May~~	Dubai Duty Free Irish Open	Downgraded to regular event					
4 Oct; ~~12 Jul~~	Aberdeen Standard Investments Scottish Open	(England) Aaron Rai	273	−11	Playoff	(England) Tommy Fleetwood	
~~11 Oct~~	Italian Open	Downgraded to regular event					
11 Oct; ~~13 Sep~~	BMW PGA Championship	(England) Tyrrell Hatton	269	−19	4 strokes	(France) Victor Perez	
~~8 Nov~~	Turkish Airlines Open	Cancelled due to the COVID-19 pandemic					
~~6 Dec~~; ~~15 Nov~~	Nedbank Golf Challenge	Cancelled due to the COVID-19 pandemic					
13 Dec; ~~22 Nov~~	DP World Tour Championship, Dubai	(England) Matt Fitzpatrick	273	−15	1 stroke	(England) Lee Westwood	

== 2021 season ==
=== Schedule ===
Date	Tournament	Winner	Score	To par	Margin of victory	Runner(s)-up	Ref.
24 Jan	Abu Dhabi HSBC Championship	(England) Tyrrell Hatton	270	−18	4 strokes	(Australia) Jason Scrivener	
11 Jul	Abrdn Scottish Open	(Australia) Min Woo Lee	266	−18	Playoff	(Belgium) Thomas Detry (England) Matt Fitzpatrick	
12 Sep	BMW PGA Championship	(United States) Billy Horschel	269	−19	1 stroke	(Thailand) Kiradech Aphibarnrat (England) Laurie Canter (Wales) Jamie Donaldson	
21 Nov	DP World Tour Championship, Dubai	(United States) Collin Morikawa	271	−17	3 strokes	(Sweden) Alexander Björk (England) Matt Fitzpatrick	

== 2022 season ==
=== Schedule ===
Date	Tournament	Winner	Score	To par	Margin of victory	Runner(s)-up	Ref.
23 Jan	Abu Dhabi HSBC Championship	(Belgium) Thomas Pieters	278	−10	1 stroke	(Spain) Rafa Cabrera-Bello (India) Shubhankar Sharma	
30 Jan	Slync.io Dubai Desert Classic	(Norway) Viktor Hovland	276	−12	Playoff	(England) Richard Bland	
10 Jul	Genesis Scottish Open	(United States) Xander Schauffele	273	−7	1 stroke	(United States) Kurt Kitayama	
11 Sep	BMW PGA Championship	(Republic of Ireland) Shane Lowry	199 (Note: Shortened to 54 holes due to Operation London Bridge.)	−17	1 stroke	(Northern Ireland) Rory McIlroy (Spain) Jon Rahm	
20 Nov	DP World Tour Championship	(Spain) Jon Rahm	268	−20	2 strokes	(England) Tyrrell Hatton (Sweden) Alex Norén	

== 2023 season ==
=== Schedule ===
Date	Tournament	Winner	Score	To par	Margin of victory	Runner(s)-up	Ref.
22 Jan	Abu Dhabi HSBC Championship	(France) Victor Perez	270	−18	1 stroke	(Australia) Min Woo Lee (Sweden) Sebastian Söderberg	
30 Jan	Hero Dubai Desert Classic	(Northern Ireland) Rory McIlroy	269	−19	1 stroke	(United States) Patrick Reed	
16 Jul	Genesis Scottish Open	(Northern Ireland) Rory McIlroy	265	−15	1 stroke	(Scotland) Robert MacIntyre	
17 Sep	BMW PGA Championship	(New Zealand) Ryan Fox	270	−18	1 stroke	(England) Tyrrell Hatton (England) Aaron Rai	
19 Nov	DP World Tour Championship	(Denmark) Nicolai Højgaard	267	−21	2 strokes	(England) Tommy Fleetwood (Norway) Viktor Hovland (England) Matt Wallace	

== 2024 season ==
=== Schedule ===
Date	Tournament	Winner	Score	To par	Margin of victory	Runner(s)-up	Ref.
21 Jan	Hero Dubai Desert Classic	(Northern Ireland) Rory McIlroy	274	−14	1 stroke	(Poland) Adrian Meronk	
14 Jul	Genesis Scottish Open	(Scotland) Robert MacIntyre	262	−18	1 stroke	(Australia) Adam Scott	
22 Sep	BMW PGA Championship	(United States) Billy Horschel	268	−20	Playoff	(South Africa) Thriston Lawrence (Northern Ireland) Rory McIlroy	
10 Nov	Abu Dhabi HSBC Championship	(England) Paul Waring	264	−24	2 strokes	(England) Tyrrell Hatton	
17 Nov	DP World Tour Championship	(Northern Ireland) Rory McIlroy	273	−15	2 strokes	(Denmark) Rasmus Højgaard	

== 2025 season ==
=== Schedule ===
Date	Tournament	Winner	Score	To par	Margin of victory	Runner(s)-up	Ref.
19 Jan	Hero Dubai Desert Classic	(England) Tyrrell Hatton	273	−15	1 stroke	(New Zealand) Daniel Hillier	
13 Jul	Genesis Scottish Open	(United States) Chris Gotterup	265	−15	2 strokes	(Northern Ireland) Rory McIlroy (England) Marco Penge	
14 Sep	BMW PGA Championship	(Sweden) Alex Norén	269	−19	Playoff	(France) Adrien Saddier	
9 Nov	Abu Dhabi HSBC Championship	(England) Aaron Rai	263	−25	Playoff	(England) Tommy Fleetwood	
16 Nov	DP World Tour Championship	(England) Matt Fitzpatrick	270	−18	Playoff	(Northern Ireland) Rory McIlroy	

== 2026 season ==
=== Schedule ===
Date	Tournament	Winner	Score	To par	Margin of victory	Runner(s)-up	Ref.
25 Jan	Hero Dubai Desert Classic	(United States) Patrick Reed	274	−14	4 strokes	(England) Andy Sullivan	
12 Jul	Genesis Scottish Open	(South Korea) Tom Kim	263	−17	2 strokes	(Australia) Min Woo Lee	
20 Sep	BMW PGA Championship	(United States) J. J. Spaun	271	−17	2 strokes	(Spain) Manuel Elvira (Northern Ireland) Rory McIlroy (England) Aaron Rai (Australia) Adam Scott	
8 Nov	Abu Dhabi Aldar Championship	(Spain) Jon Rahm	265	−23	2 strokes	(England) Tyrrell Hatton	
15 Nov	DP World Tour Championship	(England) Tyrrell Hatton	273	−15	5 strokes	(Northern Ireland) Rory McIlroy	

== Multiple winners ==
Rank	Player	Wins	Tournaments won
T1	(England) Tyrrell Hatton	6	2017 Italian Open, 2019 Turkish Airlines Open, 2020 BMW PGA Championship, 2021 Abu Dhabi HSBC Championship, 2025 Hero Dubai Desert Classic, 2026 DP World Tour Championship
T1	(Spain) Jon Rahm	6	2017 Dubai Duty Free Irish Open, 2017 DP World Tour Championship, Dubai, 2019 Dubai Duty Free Irish Open, 2019 DP World Tour Championship, Dubai, 2022 DP World Tour Championship, 2026 Abu Dhabi Aldar Championship
3	(Northern Ireland) Rory McIlroy	4	2023 Hero Dubai Desert Classic, 2023 Genesis Scottish Open, 2024 Hero Dubai Desert Classic, 2024 DP World Tour Championship
4	(Sweden) Alex Norén	3	2017 BMW PGA Championship, 2018 HNA Open de France, 2025 BMW PGA Championship
T5	(England) Matt Fitzpatrick	2	2020 DP World Tour Championship, Dubai, 2025 DP World Tour Championship
T5	(England) Tommy Fleetwood	2	2017 HNA Open de France, 2019 Nedbank Golf Challenge
T5	(United States) Billy Horschel	2	2021 BMW PGA Championship, 2024 BMW PGA Championship
T5	(Republic of Ireland) Shane Lowry	2	2019 Abu Dhabi HSBC Championship, 2022 BMW PGA Championship
T5	(England) Aaron Rai	2	2020 Aberdeen Standard Investments Scottish Open, 2025 Abu Dhabi HSBC Championship
T5	(England) Justin Rose	2	2017 Turkish Airlines Open, 2018 Turkish Airlines Open
T5	(England) Lee Westwood	2	2018 Nedbank Golf Challenge, 2020 Abu Dhabi HSBC Championship
T5	(Austria) Bernd Wiesberger	2	2019 Aberdeen Standard Investments Scottish Open, 2019 Italian Open
T5	(England) Danny Willett	2	2018 DP World Tour Championship, Dubai, 2019 BMW PGA Championship

== See also ==
- International Series (golf)
