= Oman Open =

Coordinates: 23.6141°N 58.3018°E

Tournament information
- Location: Muscat, Oman
- Established: 2018
- Course: Al Mouj Golf
- Par: 72
- Length: 7,365 yards (6,735 m)
- Tour: European Tour
- Format: Stroke play
- Prize fund: US$1,750,000
- Month played: March
- Final year: 2020

Tournament record score
- Aggregate: 272 Joost Luiten (2018)
- To par: −16 as above

Final champion
- (Finland) Sami Välimäki

Location map
- Location in Oman

The Oman Open is a European Tour golf tournament, held at Al Mouj Golf in Muscat, Oman. When founded in 2018, it was one of five European Tour events to be staged in the Arabian Peninsula, but is currently one of six.

Though it was the first European Tour event in Oman, the course had previously hosted the Challenge Tour's National Bank of Oman Golf Classic from 2013 to 2014 and the NBO Golf Classic Grand Final from 2015 to 2017.

== Winners ==
Year	Winner	Score	To par	Margin of victory	Runner(s)-up	Purse (US$)	Winner's share ($)
Oman Open
2021	No tournament due to the COVID-19 pandemic						
2020	(Finland) Sami Välimäki	275	−13	Playoff	(South Africa) Brandon Stone	1,750,000	291,667
2019	(United States) Kurt Kitayama	281	−7	1 stroke	(Spain) Jorge Campillo (Germany) Maximilian Kieffer (France) Clément Sordet (Paraguay) Fabrizio Zanotti	1,750,000	291,667
NBO Oman Open
2018	(Netherlands) Joost Luiten	272	−16	2 strokes	(England) Chris Wood	1,750,000	291,667

== See also ==
- Open golf tournament
