= Tyrrell Hatton =

English professional golfer (born 1991)

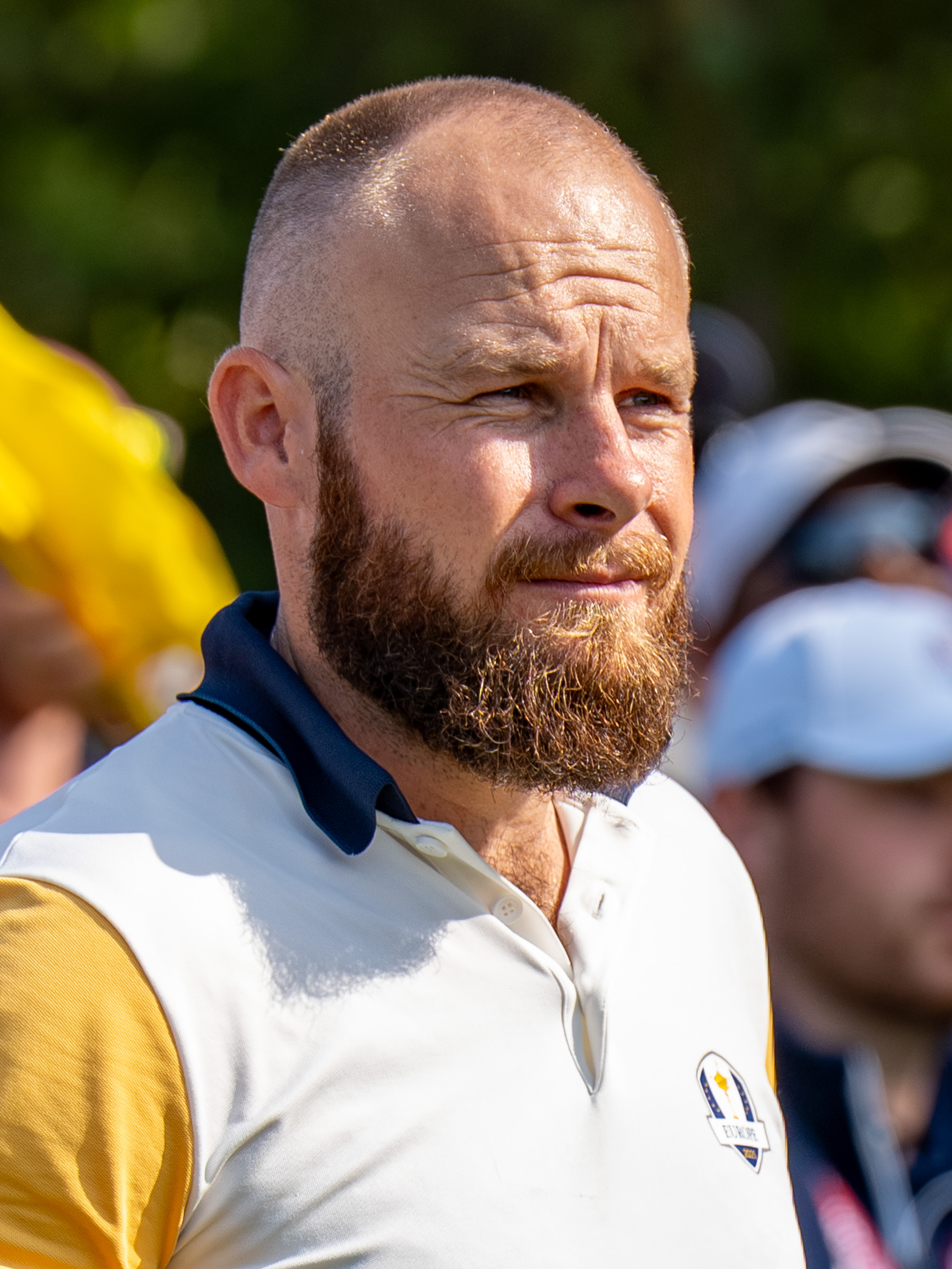
- Hatton at the 2025 Ryder Cup

Personal information
- Full name: Tyrrell Glen Hatton
- Nationality: England
- Born: 14 October 1991 (age 35) High Wycombe, Buckinghamshire, England
- Height: 5 ft 9 in (1.75 m)
- Weight: 161 lb (73 kg; 11.5 st)
- Spouse: Emily Braisher (m. 2021)

Career
- Sport: Golf
- Turned professional: 2011
- Current tours: European Tour; LIV Golf
- Former tours: PGA Tour; Challenge Tour
- Professional wins: 15
- Highest ranking: 5 (24 January 2021) (as of 15 November 2026)

Number of wins by tour
- PGA Tour: 1
- European Tour: 9
- LIV Golf: 2
- Other: 3

Best results in major championships
- Masters Tournament: T3: 2026
- PGA Championship: T10: 2016, 2018
- U.S. Open: T4: 2025
- The Open Championship: T5: 2016

Tyrrell Glen Hatton (/ˈtɪrəl/; born 14 October 1991) is an English professional golfer. He has played on the European Tour, winning nine times, including six Rolex Series events, and the PGA Tour, winning once at the 2020 Arnold Palmer Invitational. He has represented Europe on four Ryder Cup teams, winning three times. In 2024, he joined LIV Golf as a member of Legion XIII GC.

== Early life and amateur career ==
Hatton was born on October 14, 1991, in High Wycombe, Buckinghamshire, England. He began playing golf at an early age, first swinging a golf club at approximately 13 months old. His father, Jeff Hatton, introduced him to the sport and coached him throughout his childhood. By age three, Hatton was playing on the par-three course at Wycombe Heights Golf Centre. He joined Harleyford Golf Club as a junior member at the age of 11. Hatton attended Great Marlow School in Marlow, Buckinghamshire, before pursuing a professional golf career.

As a child, Hatton regularly attended the BMW PGA Championship at Wentworth Club with his father. He later recalled that watching the event inspired his desire to compete on the European Tour and eventually win the championship himself.

Hatton qualified for the 2010 Open Championship as an amateur.

== Professional career ==
Hatton turned professional in August 2011 after representing England as an amateur and reaching the semifinal of the 2011 English Amateur Championship. Prior to joining the Challenge Tour in 2012, Hatton mainly played on the PGA EuroPro Tour and the Jamega Pro Golf Tour, winning two events on each tour. His first professional win came at Woodcote Park Golf Club on the Jamega Tour. He followed this up with a second win on the Jamega Tour at Caversham Heath. Hatton was a medalist at the PGA EuroPro Tour's 2012 qualifying school at Frilford Heath Golf Club and followed this with a second win at the Your Golf Travel Classic at Bovey Castle later in the same season. He was named Rookie of the Year that season.

Hatton played on the Challenge Tour in 2012 and 2013. His best results were a pair of tied-second-place finishes at the Kazakhstan Open and The Foshan Open in 2013. He finished tenth on the 2013 Challenge Tour rankings to qualify for the 2014 European Tour.

In his rookie season on the European Tour, Hatton finished tied for second at the 2014 Joburg Open, a qualifying series event for the 2014 Open Championship at Hoylake. Ties for qualification were broken by the Official World Golf Ranking, with Hatton missing out as the lowest-ranked player. Later in the year, he finished tied for fourth at the Aberdeen Asset Management Scottish Open, the final qualifying series event, to earn his place in The Open field.

On 9 October 2016, Hatton secured his first European Tour victory at the Alfred Dunhill Links Championship at St Andrews. He finished on 23 under par, four shots clear of South African Richard Sterne and England's Ross Fisher. Hatton carded a final round six-under-par 66, having equalled the St Andrews Old Course record with a 62 in the third round. The win moved him inside the top 35 of the Official World Golf Ranking, from 53rd.

After a summer of struggles in 2017, Hatton found himself in contention at the British Masters, but a disappointing weekend saw him finish tied for eighth. His on-course temperament was called into question, with veteran European Tour professional Gary Evans telling him to "grow up". Hatton responded a week later by successfully defending his Alfred Dunhill Links Championship title, saying: "Nobody's perfect." The following week, he won the Italian Open, securing back-to-back victories. At the Masters Tournament, he fell on the golf course and suffered a wrist injury that necessitated surgery in 2020.

In early 2017, Hatton earned special temporary membership on the PGA Tour after recording three consecutive top-ten finishes in the United States: tied fourth at The Honda Classic, tenth at the WGC-Mexico Championship and tied fourth at the Arnold Palmer Invitational. The membership allowed him to accept unlimited sponsor exemptions for the remainder of the 2016–17 season. He subsequently earned a full PGA Tour card for the 2017–18 season after finishing fourth among non-members in the 2016–17 FedExCup standings, qualifying through the Tour's Top 125 Non-Member category.

In September 2018, Hatton qualified for the European team at the 2018 Ryder Cup. Europe defeated the United States 17½–10½ at Le Golf National outside Paris, France. Hatton won one of his two fourball matches alongside Paul Casey, lost the other and was defeated by Patrick Reed in his singles match.

In November 2019, Hatton won the Turkish Airlines Open. He finished the event at 20-under-par before winning a six-man playoff to claim the title and the first prize of US$2,000,000.

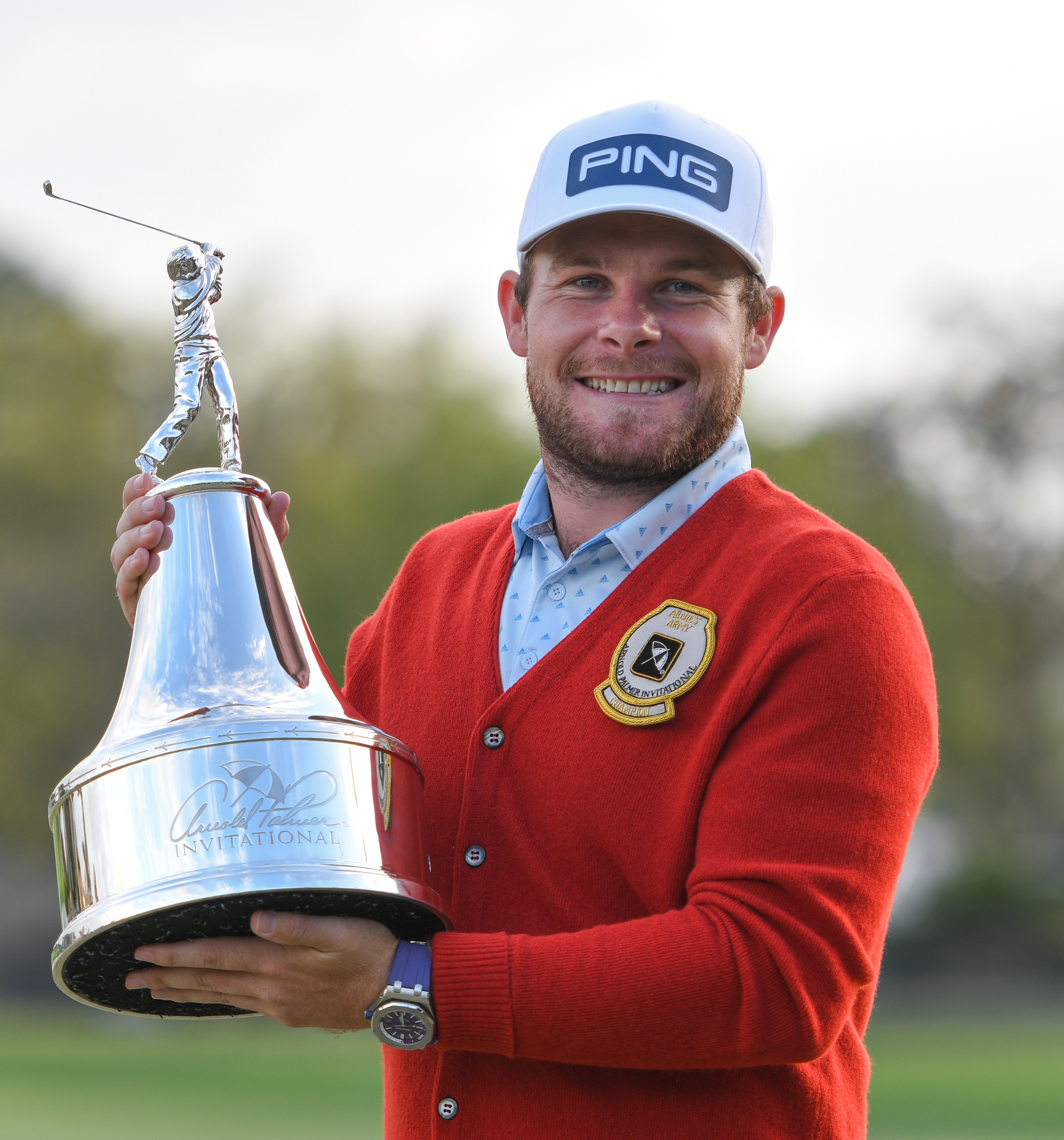
Hatton after winning the Arnold Palmer Invitational in 2020

In March 2020, Hatton won the Arnold Palmer Invitational by one stroke over Marc Leishman for his first PGA Tour victory. In October, Hatton won the European Tour's flagship event, the BMW PGA Championship at Wentworth. He became the second player to win three Rolex Series events, and the win lifted him into the top 10 of the world ranking for the first time.

In January 2021, Hatton won the Abu Dhabi HSBC Championship. It was his fourth Rolex Series victory.

In September 2021, Hatton represented Europe at the 2021 Ryder Cup at Whistling Straits in Kohler, Wisconsin. The United States defeated Europe 19–9, with Hatton recording a 1–2–1 record and losing his Sunday singles match against Justin Thomas.

In September 2023, Hatton represented Europe at the 2023 Ryder Cup at Marco Simone Golf and Country Club in Rome, Italy. Europe won 16½–11½, with Hatton recording a 3–0–1 record, including a victory in his Sunday singles match against Brian Harman.

In January 2024, Hatton joined LIV Golf, becoming a member of Legion XIII. Later that season, Hatton won his first LIV Golf event at LIV Golf Nashville, shooting a six-under-par final round to claim victory. In October, he won the Alfred Dunhill Links Championship for the third time, becoming the first player to win the tournament three times.

In January 2025, Hatton won the Hero Dubai Desert Classic, his eighth DP World Tour title and fifth Rolex Series victory.

In September 2025, Hatton represented Europe at the 2025 Ryder Cup at Bethpage Black in Farmingdale, New York. Europe defeated the United States 15–13 to retain the trophy. Hatton earned 3.5 points from four matches, including a half-point in his Sunday singles match against Collin Morikawa, which secured the point Europe needed to reach the winning total.

In June 2026, Hatton won LIV Golf Andalucía at Real Club Valderrama, defeating Jon Rahm by two strokes for his second LIV Golf individual victory.

In November 2026, Hatton won the DP World Tour Championship at Jumeirah Golf Estates in Dubai. He carded a final-round six-under-par 66 to finish at 15-under-par, five strokes ahead of Rory McIlroy. The victory marked his ninth DP World Tour title and sixth Rolex Series win.

== Personal life ==
Hatton married Emily Braisher in 2021. The couple have a daughter named Althea, who was born in May 2026.

Hatton is a supporter of Liverpool F.C.

== Professional wins (15) ==
=== PGA Tour wins (1) ===
No.	Date	Tournament	Winning score	Margin of victory	Runner-up
1	8 Mar 2020	Arnold Palmer Invitational	−4 (68-69-73-74=284)	1 stroke	(Australia) Marc Leishman

=== European Tour wins (9) ===
Legend
Flagship events (1)
Playoff events (1)
Rolex Series (6) (Note: The 2020 BMW PGA Championship and the 2026 DP World Tour Championship were also a Rolex Series tournaments.)
Other European Tour (3)

No.	Date	Tournament	Winning score	Margin of victory	Runner(s)-up
1	9 Oct 2016	Alfred Dunhill Links Championship	−23 (67-70-62-66=265)	4 strokes	(England) Ross Fisher, (South Africa) Richard Sterne
2	8 Oct 2017	Alfred Dunhill Links Championship (2)	−24 (68-65-65-66=264)	3 strokes	(England) Ross Fisher
3	15 Oct 2017	Italian Open	−21 (69-64-65-65=263)	1 stroke	(Thailand) Kiradech Aphibarnrat, (England) Ross Fisher
4	10 Nov 2019	Turkish Airlines Open	−20 (68-68-65-67=268)	Playoff	(France) Benjamin Hébert, (United States) Kurt Kitayama, (France) Victor Perez, (Austria) Matthias Schwab, (South Africa) Erik van Rooyen
5	11 Oct 2020	BMW PGA Championship	−19 (66-67-69-67=269)	4 strokes	(France) Victor Perez
6	24 Jan 2021	Abu Dhabi HSBC Championship	−18 (65-68-71-66=270)	4 strokes	(Australia) Jason Scrivener
7	6 Oct 2024	Alfred Dunhill Links Championship (3)	−24 (65-68-61-70=264)	1 stroke	(Belgium) Nicolas Colsaerts
8	19 Jan 2025	Hero Dubai Desert Classic	−15 (71-65-68-69=273)	1 stroke	(New Zealand) Daniel Hillier
9	15 Nov 2026	DP World Tour Championship	−15 (70-69-68-66=273)	5 strokes	(Northern Ireland) Rory McIlroy

European Tour playoff record (1–0)

No.	Year	Tournament	Opponents	Result
1	2019	Turkish Airlines Open	(France) Benjamin Hébert, (United States) Kurt Kitayama, (France) Victor Perez, (Austria) Matthias Schwab, (South Africa) Erik van Rooyen	Won with par on fourth extra hole Kitayama eliminated by birdie on third hole Hébert, Perez and van Rooyen eliminated by birdie on first hole

=== PGA EuroPro Tour wins (1) ===
No.	Date	Tournament	Winning score	Margin of victory	Runners-up
1	25 May 2012	Your Golf Travel Classic	−12 (67-64-67=198)	3 strokes	(England) Martin LeMesurier, (Wales) Stuart Manley

=== Jamega Pro Golf Tour wins (2) ===
No.	Date	Tournament	Winning score	Margin of victory	Runners-up
1	19 Sep 2011	Woodcote Park	−5 (69-68=137)	3 strokes	(England) Adam Gee, (England) Tom Murray, (England) Graham Povey, (England) Martin Sell, (England) Nathan Treacher
2	3 Sep 2012	Caversham Heath	−11 (70-65=135)	2 strokes	(England) James Ruebotham, (England) Martin Sell

=== LIV Golf League wins (2) ===
No.	Date	Tournament	Winning score	Margin of victory	Runner-up
1	23 Jun 2024	LIV Golf Nashville	−19 (65-64-65=194)	6 strokes	(England) Sam Horsfield
2	7 Jun 2026	LIV Golf Andalucía	−11 (67-69-67-70=273)	2 strokes	(Spain) Jon Rahm

== Results in major championships ==
Results not in chronological order in 2020.

Tournament	2010	2011	2012	2013	2014	2015	2016	2017	2018
Masters Tournament								CUT	T44
U.S. Open								CUT	T6
The Open Championship	CUT			CUT	CUT	CUT	T5	CUT	T51
PGA Championship						T25	T10	CUT	T10

Tournament	2019	2020	2021	2022	2023	2024	2025	2026
Masters Tournament	T56	CUT	T18	52	T34	T9	T14	T3
PGA Championship	T48	CUT	T38	T13	T15	T63	T60	CUT
U.S. Open	T21	CUT	CUT	T56	T27	T26	T4	T7
The Open Championship	T6	NT	CUT	T11	T20	CUT	T16	T69

Top 10
Did not play

CUT = missed the halfway cut
"T" = tied
NT = no tournament due to COVID-19 pandemic

=== Summary ===
Tournament	Wins	2nd	3rd	Top-5	Top-10	Top-25	Events	Cuts made
Masters Tournament	0	0	1	1	2	4	10	8
PGA Championship	0	0	0	0	2	5	12	9
U.S. Open	0	0	0	1	3	4	10	7
The Open Championship	0	0	0	1	2	5	14	7
Totals	0	0	1	3	9	18	46	31

- Most consecutive cuts made – 11 (2022 Masters – 2024 U.S. Open)
- Longest streak of top-10s – 2 (2016 Open – 2016 PGA)

== Results in The Players Championship ==
Tournament	2017	2018	2019	2020	2021	2022	2023
The Players Championship	T41	CUT	CUT	C	CUT	T13	2

Top 10

CUT = missed the half-way cut
"T" indicates a tie for a place
C = Cancelled after the first round due to the COVID-19 pandemic

== Results in World Golf Championships ==
Tournament	2015	2016	2017	2018	2019	2020	2021	2022	2023
Championship			10	T3	T19	T6	T22		
Match Play			T17	R16	R16	NT^{1}	T56	R16	T59
Invitational			T36	T28	T43	T69	T17		
Champions	T54	T23	T11	T22	T14	NT^{1}	NT^{1}	NT^{1}	

^{1}Cancelled due to COVID-19 pandemic

Top 10
Did not play

QF, R16, R32, R64 = Round in which player lost in match play
NT = No tournament
"T" = Tied
Note that the Championship and Invitational were discontinued from 2022. The Champions was discontinued from 2023.

== Team appearances ==
Professional

- EurAsia Cup (representing Europe): 2018 (winners)
- Ryder Cup (representing Europe): 2018 (winners), 2021, 2023 (winners), 2025 (winners)
- World Cup (representing England): 2018
- Team Cup (representing Great Britain & Ireland): 2023, 2025 (winners)

== See also ==
- 2013 Challenge Tour graduates
- List of golfers with most European Tour wins
