= DP World Tour Championship =

European Tour golf tournament

Coordinates: 25.022°N 55.199°E

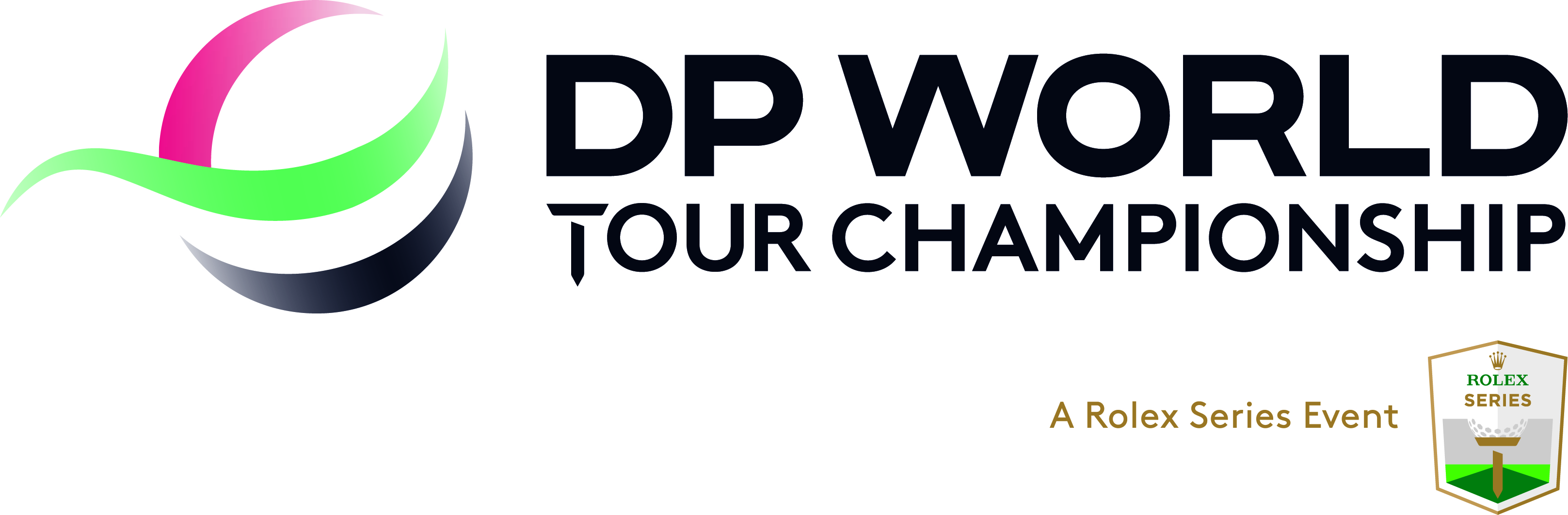

Tournament information
- Location: Dubai, United Arab Emirates
- Established: 2009
- Courses: Jumeirah Golf Estates (Earth Course)
- Par: 72
- Length: 7,675 yards (7,018 m)
- Tour: European Tour
- Format: Stroke play
- Prize fund: US$10,000,000
- Month played: November

Tournament record score
- Aggregate: 263 Henrik Stenson (2013)
- To par: −25 as above

Current champion
- (England) Tyrrell Hatton

Location map
- Location in the United Arab Emirates

The DP World Tour Championship is a golf tournament on the European Tour and is the climax of the Race to Dubai. It is contested on the Greg Norman-designed Earth course at the Jumeirah Golf Estates in Dubai, United Arab Emirates. The title sponsor is DP World, based in Dubai.

== History ==
The tournament was first held in 2009 when the Order of Merit was replaced by the Race to Dubai. It is contested by the leading 50 players in the DP World Tour Rankings at the start of the tournament. It replaced the Volvo Masters, which was a similar event for the leading 60 money winners on the Order of Merit.

Multiple winners are Rory McIlroy (3), Jon Rahm (3), Matt Fitzpatrick (2) and Henrik Stenson (2). The overlap between European Tour and PGA Tour events allows some American golfers who compete principally in the PGA Tour to contest at the Dubai World Tour Championship, but only one American, Collin Morikawa in 2021 has won the title.

Originally the tournament was to have a record prize fund of US$10,000,000, of which the winner's share would be US$1,666,660, however in September 2009 it was announced that there would be a 25% reduction in both the overall prize fund and the winners cheque. The prize fund was increased to US$8,000,000 in 2012 and then US$9,000,000 in 2021 when the European Tour announced the new title sponsorship with DP World Tour.

The tournament also determines the Race to Dubai Bonus Pool, which goes to the top golfers on the DP World Tour Rankings after the tournament. It was original set at US$10,000,000 but reduced to US$7,500,000 paid to the top 15 players with the Race to Dubai winner getting US$1,500,000. In 2012 the bonus pool was cut in half to US$3,750,000 and reduced to the top 10 golfers, with the winner getting US$1,000,000.

The 2013 DP World Tour Championship at Jumeirah Golf Estates delivered a US$44 million gross economic benefit to Dubai, according to independent research commissioned by tournament organisers, The European Tour as stated in Vision magazine.

=== Final Series and Rolex Series ===
In 2013 the European Tour introduced the Final Series, a four tournament end of season series of tournaments consisting of the Turkish Airlines Open, WGC-HSBC Champions, BMW Masters, and culminating in the DP World Tour Championship. In 2016 the series was reduced to three tournaments with the removal of the WGC-HSBC Champions and BMW Masters, and the addition of the Nedbank Golf Challenge.

In 2017 the Rolex Series was launched, which is a series of tournaments with higher prize funds than regular tour events and included the three Final Series tournaments. In 2022, there are five Rolex Series tournaments, three of which are in the United Arab Emirates.

== Winners ==
European Tour (Playoff event and Rolex Series)	2024–
European Tour (Tour Championship and Rolex Series)	2017–2023
European Tour (Race to Dubai finals series)	2013–2016
European Tour (Tour Championship)	2009–2012

#	Year	Winner	Score	To par	Margin of victory	Runner(s)-up	Purse ($)	Winner's share ($)	Ref.
DP World Tour Championship
18th	2026	(England) Tyrrell Hatton	273	−15	5 strokes	(Northern Ireland) Rory McIlroy	10,000,000	3,000,000	
17th	2025	(England) Matt Fitzpatrick (3)	270	−18	Playoff	(Northern Ireland) Rory McIlroy	10,000,000	3,000,000	
16th	2024	(Northern Ireland) Rory McIlroy (3)	273	−15	2 strokes	(Denmark) Rasmus Højgaard	10,000,000	3,000,000	
15th	2023	(Denmark) Nicolai Højgaard	267	−21	2 strokes	(England) Tommy Fleetwood (Norway) Viktor Hovland (England) Matt Wallace	10,000,000	3,000,000	
14th	2022	(Spain) Jon Rahm (3)	268	−20	2 strokes	(England) Tyrrell Hatton (Sweden) Alex Norén	10,000,000	3,000,000	
DP World Tour Championship, Dubai
13th	2021	(United States) Collin Morikawa	271	−17	3 strokes	(Sweden) Alexander Björk (England) Matt Fitzpatrick	9,000,000	3,000,000	
12th	2020	(England) Matt Fitzpatrick (2)	273	−15	1 stroke	(England) Lee Westwood	8,000,000	3,000,000	
11th	2019	(Spain) Jon Rahm (2)	269	−19	1 stroke	(England) Tommy Fleetwood	8,000,000	3,000,000	
10th	2018	(England) Danny Willett	270	−18	2 strokes	(United States) Patrick Reed (England) Matt Wallace	8,000,000	1,333,300	
9th	2017	(Spain) Jon Rahm	269	−19	1 stroke	(Thailand) Kiradech Aphibarnrat (Republic of Ireland) Shane Lowry	8,000,000	1,333,300	
8th	2016	(England) Matt Fitzpatrick	271	−17	1 stroke	(England) Tyrrell Hatton	8,000,000	1,333,300	
7th	2015	(Northern Ireland) Rory McIlroy (2)	267	−21	1 stroke	(England) Andy Sullivan	8,000,000	1,333,300	
6th	2014	(Sweden) Henrik Stenson (2)	272	−16	2 strokes	(France) Victor Dubuisson (Northern Ireland) Rory McIlroy (England) Justin Rose	8,000,000	1,333,300	
5th	2013	(Sweden) Henrik Stenson	263	−25	6 strokes	(England) Ian Poulter	8,000,000	1,333,300	
4th	2012	(Northern Ireland) Rory McIlroy	265	−23	2 strokes	(England) Justin Rose	8,000,000	1,333,300	
Dubai World Championship
3rd	2011	(Spain) Álvaro Quirós	269	−19	2 strokes	(Scotland) Paul Lawrie	7,500,000	1,166,600	
2nd	2010	(Sweden) Robert Karlsson	274	−14	Playoff	(England) Ian Poulter	7,500,000	1,166,600	
1st	2009	(England) Lee Westwood	265	−23	6 strokes	(England) Ross McGowan	7,500,000	1,166,600	
