= Thorbjørn Olesen =

Danish professional golfer (born 1989)

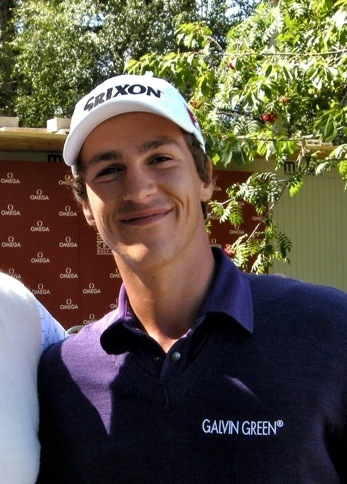

Personal information
- Full name: Jacob Thorbjørn Olesen
- Nickname: Thunder Bear
- Nationality: Denmark
- Born: 21 December 1989 (age 36) Hareskovby, Furesø Municipality, Denmark
- Height: 1.75 m (5 ft 9 in)
- Weight: 154 lb (70 kg)

Career
- Sport: Golf
- Turned professional: 2008
- Current tours: PGA Tour; European Tour
- Former tours: Challenge Tour; Nordic Golf League
- Professional wins: 15
- Highest ranking: 33 (28 April 2013)

Number of wins by tour
- European Tour: 8
- PGA Tour of Australasia: 1
- Challenge Tour: 1
- Other: 6

Best results in major championships
- Masters Tournament: T6: 2013
- PGA Championship: T27: 2012
- U.S. Open: CUT: 2013, 2018, 2019, 2022, 2025
- The Open Championship: T9: 2012

Jacob Thorbjørn Olesen (born 21 December 1989) is a Danish professional golfer who plays on the European Tour and the PGA Tour. He has won eight times on the European Tour, including the 2016 Turkish Airlines Open and the 2018 Italian Open. Olesen has also represented the Denmark team alongside Søren Kjeldsen which won the 2016 World Cup of Golf and the European team which won the 2018 Ryder Cup.

== Professional career ==
Olesen turned professional in 2008. He finished in fourth place on the third tier Nordic League rankings in 2009, having won three tournaments, to graduate to Europe's second tier Challenge Tour for 2010. During his début season he claimed his first Challenge Tour title at The Princess, held in Sweden at the beginning of July. He finished third in the 2010 Challenge Tour ranking, earning him full exemption (category 10b) for the 2011 European Tour.

In December 2010, Olesen tied for second place at the Alfred Dunhill Championship, the first tournament of the 2011 European Tour season. This was equaled in June 2011, when Olesen tied for second at the BMW Italian Open in Turin, mostly due to a 10-under-par round of 62 on the final day, but still coming up short by one stroke of Englishman Robert Rock. The following month Olesen finished in a tie for second again at the Alstom Open de France when he bogeyed the last hole to finish one stroke behind Thomas Levet. With this finish, Olesen qualified for The 2011 Open Championship, his first major.

Olesen won the 2012 Sicilian Open. This victory placed him in the top-100 of the Official World Golf Ranking. After the final event of the 2012 season, the DP World Tour Championship, Dubai where he finished T21, Olesen moved into the world top-50 for the first time as No. 50 and played the Masters for the first time in 2013.

In the 2013 Masters Tournament, after an opening round of 78, Olesen shot rounds of 70, 68, and 68 to finish at four-under-par 284, good enough for a sixth place tie. His final three rounds of 206 combined were ten-under-par, the best in the tournament. He earned enough money to be eligible for Special Temporary Membership on the PGA Tour, which he accepted. This allowed him unlimited sponsor exemptions for the remainder of the 2013 season.

In 2015, Olesen won the Alfred Dunhill Links Championship at the Old Course at St Andrews.

In 2016, Olesen won the Turkish Airlines Open in Turkey. This was part of the Race to Dubai Final Series.

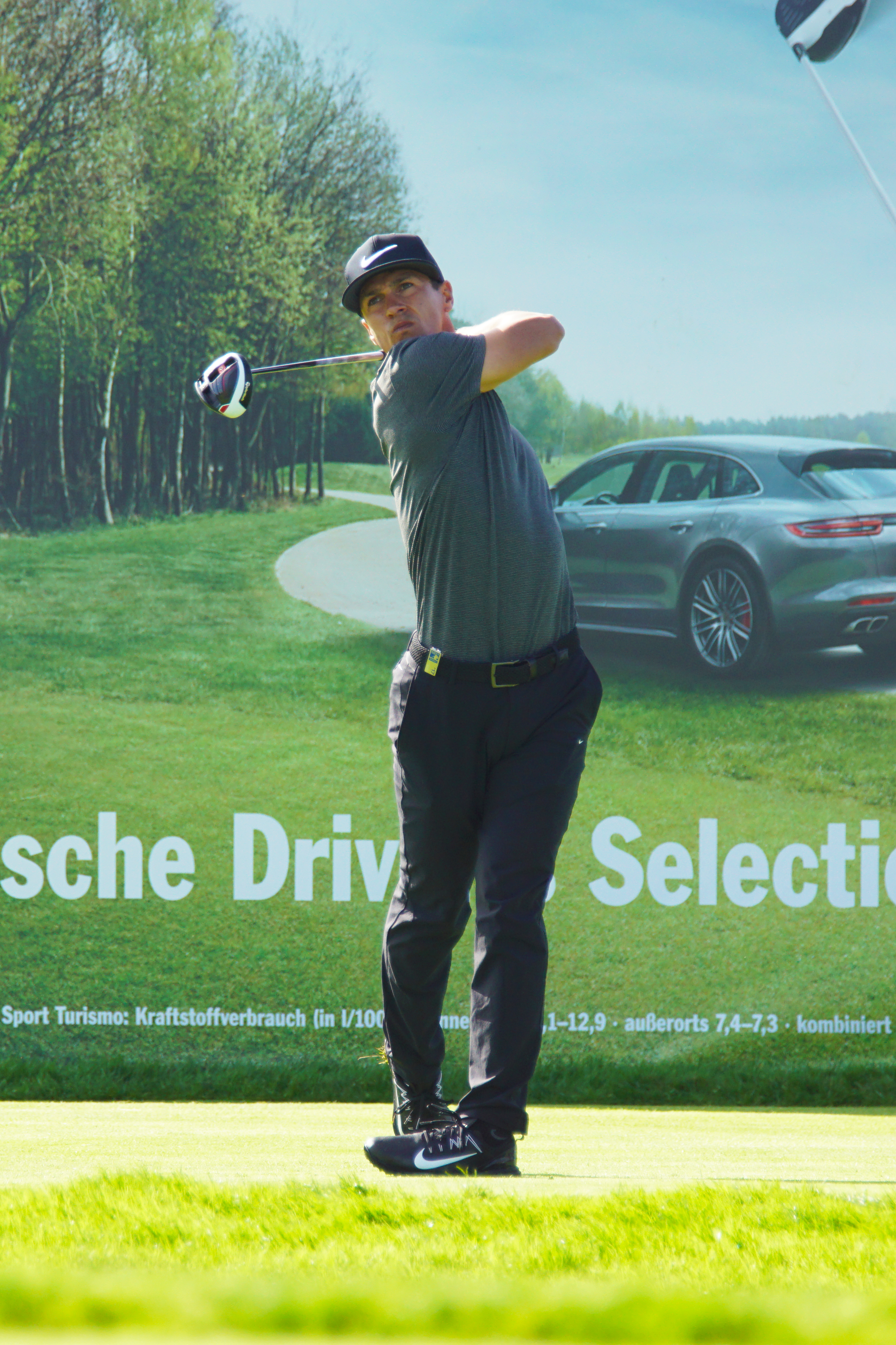
Olesen at the 2017 European Open.

In 2018, Olesen won the Italian Open for his fifth European Tour victory.

In September 2018, Olesen qualified for the 2018 Ryder Cup European team. Europe regained the Ryder Cup, winning by 17½ points to 10½. Olesen went 1–1 including defeating Jordan Spieth in singles (5 and 4).

After four years without winning, Olesen won the Betfred British Masters in May 2022. He finished eagle-birdie on the final two holes to claim a one shot victory over Sebastian Söderberg.

In February 2023, Olesen won the Thailand Classic for his seventh European Tour victory. He shot a final-round 66 to win by four shots ahead of Yannik Paul. In May 2024, Olesen would set the course record at The Dunes Golf and Beach Club with a final round 61 (−10) in the Myrtle Beach Classic.

== Personal life ==
On 29 July 2019, Olesen was arrested on suspicion of sexual assault on a British Airways flight. He was also accused of urinating in a first-class aisle. On 6 August 2019, he was formally charged with sexual assault, being drunk on an aircraft and common assault. He was suspended by the European Tour pending resolution of the criminal charges. The suspension was initially valid until the end of the legal proceedings. In July 2020, the European Tour lifted the suspension because his court date, original scheduled for 11 May 2020, was postponed until December 2021 due to the COVID-19 pandemic. On 8 December 2021, Olesen was cleared of all charges by a court in London.

Olesen supports both F.C. Copenhagen and Manchester United.

== Professional wins (15) ==
=== European Tour wins (8) ===
Legend
Race to Dubai finals series (1)
Rolex Series (1)
Other European Tour (6)

No.	Date	Tournament	Winning score	Margin of victory	Runner(s)-up
1	1 Apr 2012	Sicilian Open	−15 (68-69-67-69=273)	1 stroke	(England) Chris Wood
2	26 Oct 2014	ISPS Handa Perth International^{1}	−17 (64-69-67-71=271)	3 strokes	(France) Victor Dubuisson
3	4 Oct 2015	Alfred Dunhill Links Championship	−18 (68-66-65-71=270)	2 strokes	(United States) Brooks Koepka, (United States) Chris Stroud
4	6 Nov 2016	Turkish Airlines Open	−20 (65-62-68-69=264)	3 strokes	(England) David Horsey, (China) Li Haotong
5	3 Jun 2018	Italian Open	−22 (65-68-65-64=262)	1 stroke	(Italy) Francesco Molinari
6	8 May 2022	Betfred British Masters	−10 (66-70-69-73=278)	1 stroke	(Sweden) Sebastian Söderberg
7	19 Feb 2023	Thailand Classic	−24 (67-67-64-66=264)	4 strokes	(Germany) Yannik Paul
8	28 Jan 2024	Ras Al Khaimah Championship	−27 (69-62-63-67=261)	6 strokes	(Denmark) Rasmus Højgaard

^{1}Co-sanctioned by the PGA Tour of Australasia

European Tour playoff record (0–1)

No.	Year	Tournament	Opponent	Result
1	2015	AfrAsia Bank Mauritius Open	(South Africa) George Coetzee	Lost to birdie on second extra hole

=== Challenge Tour wins (1) ===
No.	Date	Tournament	Winning score	Margin of victory	Runners-up
1	4 Jul 2010	The Princess	−14 (69-66-65-70=270)	2 strokes	(Sweden) Peter Gustafsson, (Austria) Bernd Wiesberger

Challenge Tour playoff record (0–1)

No.	Year	Tournament	Opponent	Result
1	2010	Mugello Tuscany Open	(Netherlands) Floris de Vries	Lost to birdie on second extra hole

=== Nordic Golf League wins (4) ===
No.	Date	Tournament	Winning score	Margin of victory	Runner(s)-up
1	22 Oct 2008	ECCO Tour Qualification	−10 (67-67=134)	2 strokes	(Sweden) Petter Bocian
2	22 Jan 2009	Oliva Nova Open^{1}	−1 (74-73-68=215)	1 stroke	(England) Sean Elliott, (Denmark) Kristian Nielsen
3	29 Jan 2009	Open de Quara^{1}	−3 (70-70-73=213)	Playoff	(England) Peter James
4	15 Aug 2009	JELD-WEN Masters	−9 (71-65-71=207)	3 strokes	(Denmark) Kristian Nielsen

^{1}Co-sanctioned by the Hi5 Pro Tour

=== Other wins (2) ===
No.	Date	Tournament	Winning score	Margin of victory	Runners-up
1	27 Nov 2016	ISPS Handa World Cup of Golf (with (Denmark) Søren Kjeldsen)	−20 (72-60-70-66=268)	4 strokes	China − Li Haotong and Wu Ashun, France − Victor Dubuisson and Romain Langasque, United States − Rickie Fowler and Jimmy Walker
2	7 May 2017	GolfSixes (with (Denmark) Lucas Bjerregaard)	3–1		Australia − Sam Brazel and Scott Hend

== Results in major championships ==
Results not in chronological order in 2020.

Tournament	2011	2012	2013	2014	2015	2016	2017	2018
Masters Tournament			T6	T44				
U.S. Open			CUT					CUT
The Open Championship	CUT	T9	CUT	T64		CUT	T62	T12
PGA Championship		T27	T40	T30		CUT	T44	T56

Tournament	2019	2020	2021	2022	2023	2024	2025
Masters Tournament	T21					T58	
PGA Championship	T64				CUT	T53	T33
U.S. Open	CUT			CUT			CUT
The Open Championship	T57	NT			CUT	T43	CUT

Top 10
Did not play

CUT = missed the half-way cut
"T" = tied for place
NT = no tournament due to the COVID-19 pandemic

=== Summary ===
Tournament	Wins	2nd	3rd	Top-5	Top-10	Top-25	Events	Cuts made
Masters Tournament	0	0	0	0	1	2	4	4
PGA Championship	0	0	0	0	0	0	10	8
U.S. Open	0	0	0	0	0	0	5	0
The Open Championship	0	0	0	0	1	2	11	6
Totals	0	0	0	0	2	4	30	18

- Most consecutive cuts made – 4 (three times)
- Longest streak of top-10s – 1 (twice)

== Results in The Players Championship ==
Tournament	2013	2014	2015	2016	2017	2018	2019	2020	2021	2022	2023	2024	2025	2026
The Players Championship	CUT						T41							CUT

Did not play

CUT = missed the halfway cut
"T" indicates a tie for a place

== Results in World Golf Championships ==
Results not in chronological order before 2015.

Tournament	2012	2013	2014	2015	2016	2017	2018	2019
Championship		T53				T63		T45
Match Play		R32	R64		T38			T40
Invitational		T48				T10	T3	T27
Champions	T11		T6	T19		T31	T7	

Top 10
Did not play

QF, R16, R32, R64 = Round in which player lost in match play
"T" = tied

== Team appearances ==
Amateur

- European Boys' Team Championship (representing Denmark): 2006

Professional

- World Cup (representing Denmark): 2011, 2013, 2016 (winners), 2018
- Seve Trophy (representing Continental Europe): 2013 (winners)
- Royal Trophy (representing Europe): 2013 (winners)
- EurAsia Cup (representing Europe): 2014
- Ryder Cup (representing Europe): 2018 (winners)
- Team Cup (representing Continental Europe): 2025

== See also ==
- 2010 Challenge Tour graduates
- 2023 Race to Dubai dual card winners
- 2024 Race to Dubai dual card winners
- List of golfers with most European Tour wins
