= 2020 BMW PGA Championship =

Tournament information
- Dates: 8–11 October 2020
- Location: Virginia Water, Surrey, England; 51.40°N 0.59°W
- Courses: Wentworth Club; West Course
- Tour: European Tour

Statistics
- Par: 72
- Length: 7,302 yards (6,677 m)
- Field: 120 players, 67 after cut
- Cut: 144 (E)
- Prize fund: US$7,000,000
- Winner's share: €974,457

Champion
- (England) Tyrrell Hatton
- 269 (−19)

Location map
- Location in England Location in Surrey

The 2020 BMW PGA Championship was the 66th edition of the BMW PGA Championship, an annual golf tournament on the European Tour. The tournament was played from 8–11 October.

The tournament was originally scheduled to be held 10–13 September at the West Course of Wentworth Club in Virginia Water, Surrey, England, a suburb southwest of London. On 28 May, the European Tour announced a revised schedule in relation to the COVID-19 pandemic, which rescheduled the tournament to 15–18 October. In August, the tournament was brought forward one week in the schedule to allow for a second, unofficial "UK Swing", starting with the Dubai Duty Free Irish Open and the Aberdeen Standard Investments Scottish Open.

Tyrrell Hatton won the tournament with a score of 269, 19-under-par, after a final round 67. He finished four strokes ahead of Victor Perez. Perez was 6-under-par after 12 holes of his final round but was 2-over-par for the remaining holes, finishing with a 68.

== Course layout ==
Wentworth Club, West Course
Tee	Rating/Slope	1	2	3	4	5	6	7	8	9	Out	10	11	12	13	14	15	16	17	18	In	Total
Par		4	3	4	5	3	4	4	4	4	35	3	4	5	4	3	4	4	5	5	37	72
Yardage		473	154	465	552	203	418	396	391	449	3,501	184	416	531	470	179	489	383	610	539	3,801	7,302

== Round summaries ==
=== First round ===
Thursday 8 October 2020

There was three-way tie after the first round, with Adri Arnaus, Justin Harding and Tyrrell Hatton each scoring 6-under-par 66. Defending champion Danny Willett scored 71.

Place	Player	Score	To par
T1	(Spain) Adri Arnaus	66	−6
T1	(South Africa) Justin Harding	66	−6
T1	(England) Tyrrell Hatton	66	−6
T4	(England) Matt Fitzpatrick	67	−5
T4	(Malaysia) Gavin Green	67	−5
T4	(Republic of Ireland) Shane Lowry	67	−5
T4	(England) Eddie Pepperell	67	−5
T8	(New Zealand) Ryan Fox	68	−4
T8	(Denmark) Joachim B. Hansen	68	−4
T8	(Australia) Scott Hend	68	−4
T8	(England) Andrew Johnston	68	−4
T8	(Australia) Wade Ormsby	68	−4
T8	(England) Aaron Rai	68	−4
T8	(England) Justin Rose	68	−4
T8	(Austria) Matthias Schwab	68	−4

=== Second round ===
Friday 9 October 2020

Matt Fitzpatrick and Shane Lowry each added a 7-under-par 65 to their opening rounds of 67, and shared the lead at the half-way stage. Fitzpatrick found water at the 8th, his final hole, and made a double-bogey 6. Tyrrell Hatton added a 67 to his first round 66 to lie in third place, a stroke behind. 67 players made the cut, at even par and better.

Place	Player	Score	To par
T1	(England) Matt Fitzpatrick	67-65=132	−12
T1	(Republic of Ireland) Shane Lowry	67-65=132	−12
3	(England) Tyrrell Hatton	66-67=133	−11
T4	(Denmark) Joachim B. Hansen	68-67=135	−9
T4	(France) Victor Perez	69-66=135	−9
T6	(Spain) Adri Arnaus	66-70=136	−8
T6	(Scotland) Grant Forrest	69-67=136	−8
T8	(Australia) Scott Hend	68-69=137	−7
T8	(England) Eddie Pepperell	67-70=137	−7
T10	(New Zealand) Ryan Fox	68-70=138	−6
T10	(Malaysia) Gavin Green	67-71=138	−6
T10	(United States) Patrick Reed	70-68=138	−6

=== Third round ===
Saturday 10 October 2020

Overnight leaders, Matt Fitzpatrick and Shane Lowry, both had over-par rounds to drop down the leaderboard; Fitzpatrick scored 76 while Lowry took 74. Tyrrell Hatton took the lead after a round of 69, with Joachim B. Hansen and Victor Perez three strokes behind. Pablo Larrazábal had the best round of the day, coming home in 30 for a round of 66, while Tommy Fleetwood and David Horsey had rounds of 67 to move into a tie for 4th place with Lowry and Patrick Reed.

Place	Player	Score	To par
1	(England) Tyrrell Hatton	66-67-69=202	−14
T2	(Denmark) Joachim B. Hansen	68-67-70=205	−11
T2	(France) Victor Perez	69-66-70=205	−11
T4	(England) Tommy Fleetwood	71-68-67=206	−10
T4	(England) David Horsey	70-69-67=206	−10
T4	(Republic of Ireland) Shane Lowry	67-65-74=206	−10
T4	(United States) Patrick Reed	70-68-68=206	−10
T8	(England) Eddie Pepperell	67-70-70=207	−9
T8	(England) Ian Poulter	69-70-68=207	−9
T10	(England) Matt Fitzpatrick	67-65-76=208	−8
T10	(Japan) Masahiro Kawamura	70-69-69=208	−8
T10	(Spain) Pablo Larrazábal	73-69-66=208	−8

=== Final round ===
Sunday, 11 October 2020

Overnight leader Tyrrell Hatton won the tournament with a score of 269, 19-under-par, after a final round 67. He finished four strokes ahead of Victor Perez. Perez was 6-under-par after 12 holes of his final round but was 2-over-par for the remaining holes, finishing with a 68. Patrick Reed had an eagle at the final hole to finish tied for third place with Andy Sullivan, who had a final round 65. Ian Poulter finished fifth, with Eddie Pepperell in sixth place.

Place	Player	Score	To par	Prize money (€)
1	(England) Tyrrell Hatton	66-67-69-67=269	−19	974,457
2	(France) Victor Perez	69-66-70-68=273	−15	630,531
T3	(United States) Patrick Reed	70-68-68-68=274	−14	323,863
T3	(England) Andy Sullivan	71-69-69-65=274	−14	323,863
5	(England) Ian Poulter	69-70-68-68=275	−13	243,041
6	(England) Eddie Pepperell	67-70-70-69=276	−12	200,623
T7	(England) Matt Fitzpatrick	67-65-76-69=277	−11	147,888
T7	(Denmark) Joachim B. Hansen	68-67-70-72=277	−11	147,888
T7	(Italy) Renato Paratore	73-69-68-67=277	−11	147,888
T10	(Australia) Scott Hend	68-69-73-68=278	−10	106,234
T10	(Germany) Martin Kaymer	73-68-69-68=278	−10	106,234
T10	(Sweden) Marcus Kinhult	72-67-71-68=278	−10	106,234
