= Shenzhen International (golf) =

Coordinates: 22.7015°N 114.2615°E

Tournament information
- Location: Shenzhen, China
- Established: 2015
- Course: Genzon Golf Club
- Par: 72
- Length: 7,145 yards (6,533 m)
- Tour: European Tour
- Format: Stroke play
- Prize fund: US$2,800,000
- Month played: April
- Final year: 2017

Tournament record score
- Aggregate: 272 Lee Soo-min (2016); 272 Tommy Fleetwood (2017); 272 Bernd Wiesberger (2017)
- To par: −16 as above

Final champion
- (Austria) Bernd Wiesberger
- Location in China

The Shenzhen International was a European Tour golf tournament played from 2015 to 2017 in China. The inaugural tournament was played from 16–19 April 2015 at the Genzon Golf Club, in Shenzhen.

== Winners ==
Year	Winner	Score	To par	Margin of victory	Runner(s)-up
2017	(Austria) Bernd Wiesberger	272	−16	Playoff	(England) Tommy Fleetwood
2016	(South Korea) Lee Soo-min	272	−16	2 strokes	(Netherlands) Joost Luiten (South Africa) Brandon Stone
2015	(Thailand) Kiradech Aphibarnrat	276	−12	Playoff	(China) Li Haotong
