= 2019 BMW PGA Championship =

Tournament information
- Dates: 19–22 September 2019
- Location: Virginia Water, Surrey, England; 51.40°N 0.59°W
- Courses: Wentworth Club; West Course
- Tour: European Tour

Statistics
- Par: 72
- Length: 7,302 yards (6,677 m)
- Field: 132 players, 74 after cut
- Cut: 145 (+1)
- Prize fund: US$7,000,000

Champion
- (England) Danny Willett
- 268 (−20)

Location map
- Location in England Location in Surrey

The 2019 BMW PGA Championship was the 65th edition of the BMW PGA Championship, an annual golf tournament on the European Tour, held 19–22 September at the West Course of Wentworth Club in Virginia Water, Surrey, England, a suburb southwest of London.

Danny Willett, co-leader after three rounds with Jon Rahm, won by three strokes from Rahm with Christiaan Bezuidenhout in third place.

== Course layout ==
Wentworth Club, West Course
Tee	Rating/Slope	1	2	3	4	5	6	7	8	9	Out	10	11	12	13	14	15	16	17	18	In	Total
Yardage	n/a	473	154	465	552	203	418	396	391	449	3,501	184	416	531	470	179	489	383	610	539	3,801	7,302
Par		4	3	4	5	3	4	4	4	4	35	3	4	5	4	3	4	4	5	5	37	72

== Round summaries ==
=== First round ===
Thursday, 19 September 2019

Place	Player	Score	To par
1	(England) Matt Wallace	65	−7
T2	(Spain) Jon Rahm	66	−6
T2	(Sweden) Henrik Stenson	66	−6
4	(England) Justin Rose	67	−5
T5	(South Africa) Christiaan Bezuidenhout	68	−4
T5	(England) Paul Casey	68	−4
T5	(South Africa) George Coetzee	68	−4
T5	(South Africa) Ernie Els	68	−4
T5	(Scotland) Scott Jamieson	68	−4
T5	(Netherlands) Joost Luiten	68	−4
T5	(Italy) Andrea Pavan	68	−4
T5	(Sweden) Sebastian Söderberg	68	−4
T5	(England) Danny Willett	68	−4

=== Second round ===
Friday, 20 September 2019

Play was suspended because of darkness with 5 players still to complete their second round. They completed their second round early on Saturday morning.

Place	Player	Score	To par
T1	(Spain) Jon Rahm	66-67=133	−11
T1	(England) Danny Willett	68-65=133	−11
T3	(South Africa) Christiaan Bezuidenhout	68-67=135	−9
T3	(England) Justin Rose	67-68=135	−9
T3	(Sweden) Henrik Stenson	66-69=135	−9
T6	(England) Paul Casey	68-69=137	−7
T6	(United States) Billy Horschel	72-65=137	−7
T8	(United States) Tony Finau	70-68=138	−6
T8	(Norway) Viktor Hovland	69-69=138	−6
T8	(United States) Andrew Putnam	71-67=138	−6
T8	(India) Shubhankar Sharma	71-67=138	−6

=== Third round ===
Saturday, 21 September 2019

Overnight co-leaders Jon Rahm and Danny Willett both scored 68 and they extended their lead over the rest of the field from two strokes to three. Three players were tied for third place: Christiaan Bezuidenhout and Justin Rose who both scored 69 while Shubhankar Sharma scored 66. Ross Fisher scored 66, finishing with an albatross 2 at the final hole, coming home in 29. Rory McIlroy scored 65, the best round of the day, but was still 9 strokes behind the leaders.

Place	Player	Score	To par
T1	(Spain) Jon Rahm	66-67-68=201	−15
T1	(England) Danny Willett	68-65-68=201	−15
T3	(South Africa) Christiaan Bezuidenhout	68-67-69=204	−12
T3	(England) Justin Rose	67-68-69=204	−12
T3	(India) Shubhankar Sharma	71-67-66=204	−12
T6	(Spain) Rafa Cabrera-Bello	69-70-67=206	−10
T6	(Scotland) Richie Ramsay	71-68-67=206	−10
8	(United States) Patrick Reed	70-70-67=207	−9
T9	(England) Paul Casey	68-69-71=208	−8
T9	(United States) Billy Horschel	72-65-71=208	−8
T9	(Norway) Viktor Hovland	69-69-70=208	−8
T9	(England) Andrew Johnston	69-70-69=208	−8
T9	(Italy) Francesco Molinari	69-70-69=208	−8
T9	(United States) Andrew Putnam	71-67-70=208	−8

=== Final round ===
Sunday, 22 September 2019

Place	Player	Score	To par	Prize money (€)
1	(England) Danny Willett	68-65-68-67=268	−20	1,056,662
2	(Spain) Jon Rahm	66-67-68-70=271	−17	704,438
3	(South Africa) Christiaan Bezuidenhout	68-67-69-68=272	−16	396,884
T4	(United States) Billy Horschel	72-65-71-65=273	−15	292,908
T4	(United States) Patrick Reed	70-70-67-66=273	−15	292,908
T6	(Spain) Rafa Cabrera-Bello	69-70-67-69=275	−13	206,050
T6	(Scotland) Richie Ramsay	71-68-67-69=275	−13	206,050
8	(England) Justin Rose	67-68-69-72=276	−12	158,500
T9	(England) Andrew Johnston	69-70-69-69=277	−11	134,408
T9	(Northern Ireland) Rory McIlroy	76-69-65-67=277	−11	134,408
