= Sam Brazel =

Australian professional golfer

Personal information
- Nationality: Australia
- Born: 28 December 1978 (age 47)
- Height: 5 ft 10 in (178 cm)

Career
- Sport: Golf
- Turned professional: 2002
- Current tour: Asian Tour
- Former tour: European Tour
- Professional wins: 1

Number of wins by tour
- European Tour: 1
- Asian Tour: 1

Sam Brazel (born 28 December 1978) is an Australian professional golfer.

Brazel has played on the Asian Tour since 2013. He won the 2016 UBS Hong Kong Open that was part of the 2016 Asian Tour and the 2017 European Tour. Entering the event, he was ranked 480th in the world. This was his first European Tour victory. The win gives him a two-year exemption on the European Tour.

== Professional wins (1) ==
=== European Tour wins (1) ===
No.	Date	Tournament	Winning score	Margin of victory	Runner-up
1	11 Dec 2016 (2017 season)	UBS Hong Kong Open^{1}	−13 (66-66-67-68=267)	1 stroke	(Spain) Rafa Cabrera-Bello

^{1}Co-sanctioned by the Asian Tour

=== Asian Tour wins (1) ===
No.	Date	Tournament	Winning score	Margin of victory	Runner-up
1	11 Dec 2016	UBS Hong Kong Open^{1}	−13 (66-66-67-68=267)	1 stroke	(Spain) Rafa Cabrera-Bello

^{1}Co-sanctioned by the European Tour

== Results in World Golf Championships ==
Tournament	2017
Championship	T55
Match Play	
Invitational	
Champions	

Did not play

"T" = Tied
