= 2019 Challenge Tour graduates =

This is a list of players who graduated from the Challenge Tour in 2019. The top 15 players on the Challenge Tour rankings in 2019 earned European Tour cards for 2020.

	2019 Challenge Tour		2020 European Tour					2021 European Tour				
Player	Points rank	Points	Starts	Cuts made	Best finish	Points rank	Points	Starts	Cuts made	Best finish	Points rank	Points
(Italy) Francesco Laporta	1	210,122	18	10	T2	104	331	26	15	T2	41	1,056
(Scotland) Calum Hill*	2	146,834	21	14	T8	101	342	25	18	Win	32	1,216
(England) Richard Bland	3	142,402	21	16	T2	76	465	23	17	Win	11	1,913
(Germany) Sebastian Heisele	4	130,405	16	9	4th	110	320	15	4	T9	188	127
(Poland) Adrian Meronk*	5	128,732	22	12	T2	84	432	22	15	T2	39	1,069
(England) Jack Senior^{†}	6	124,347	23	16	T4	88	407	28	18	T6	81	609
(France) Robin Roussel*	7	122,552	19	9	T14	166	156	24	9	T26	180	149
(France) Antoine Rozner*	8	120,468	21	18	Win	26	983	21	17	Win	44	1,025
(England) Matthew Jordan^{†}	9	119,142	21	17	T3	77	464	23	14	T4	76	638
(Portugal) Ricardo Santos	10	107,524	19	8	T24	210	72	26	10	T6	161	205
(Northern Ireland) Cormac Sharvin*	11	103,088	20	10	T19	168	152	25	10	T21	166	187
(Wales) Oliver Farr	12	92,440	19	9	T3	129	259	24	13	T11	145	258
(Netherlands) Darius van Driel*	13	91,862	19	10	T4	157	175	22	15	T2	97	505
(Scotland) Connor Syme	14	89,732	23	15	T3	65	608	24	11	3rd	104	459
(Spain) Sebastián García Rodríguez*	15	86,658	23	12	T4	130	253	26	10	4th	120	385

* European Tour rookie in 2020
^{†} First-time member ineligible for Rookie of the Year award
T = Tied
The player retained full European Tour status for 2022 (finished inside the top 121 in 2021).
The player retained category 16 European Tour status for 2022 (finished outside the top 121 in 2021).

Due to the effects of the COVID-19 pandemic on the 2020 European Tour season, all of the graduates retained the same status in 2021 except Rozner, who was promoted to the winners category after his victory at the 2020 Golf in Dubai Championship.

In 2021, European Tour Qualifying School was cancelled for a second straight year, limiting the normal changes in European Tour membership between seasons. The 2019 Challenge Tour graduates that failed to finish in the top 121 of the Race to Dubai were placed in a category immediately below the 2021 Challenge Tour graduates for the 2022 European Tour season, approximately equal to the category usually given to qualifying school graduates.

== Wins on the European Tour in 2020 and 2021 ==
No.	Date	Player	Tournament	Winning score	Margin of victory	Runners-up
1	5 Dec 2020	(France) Antoine Rozner	Golf in Dubai Championship	−25 (63-69-67-64=263)	2 strokes	(Italy) Francesco Laporta (France) Mike Lorenzo-Vera (England) Andy Sullivan (England) Matt Wallace
2	14 Mar 2021	(France) Antoine Rozner (2)	Commercial Bank Qatar Masters	−8 (69-72-68-67=276)	1 stroke	(India) Gaganjeet Bhullar (South Africa) Darren Fichardt (Italy) Guido Migliozzi
3	15 May 2021	(England) Richard Bland	Betfred British Masters	−13 (68-69-72-66=275)	Playoff	(Italy) Guido Migliozzi
3	15 Aug 2021	(Scotland) Calum Hill	Cazoo Classic	−16 (68-67-70-67=272)	1 stroke	(France) Alexander Lévy

== Runner-up finishes on the European Tour in 2020 and 2021 ==
No.	Date	Player	Tournament	Winner	Winning score	Runner-up score
1	8 Dec 2019	(France) Antoine Rozner	AfrAsia Bank Mauritius Open	(Denmark) Rasmus Højgaard	−19 (66-69-66-68=269)	−19 (67-67-66-69=269)
2	29 Nov 2020	(England) Richard Bland	Alfred Dunhill Championship	(South Africa) Christiaan Bezuidenhout	−14 (69-68-68-69=274)	−10 (67-67-74-70=278)
3	29 Nov 2020	(Poland) Adrian Meronk	Alfred Dunhill Championship	(South Africa) Christiaan Bezuidenhout	−14 (69-68-68-69=274)	−10 (65-66-71-76=278)
4	5 Dec 2020	(Italy) Francesco Laporta	Golf in Dubai Championship	(France) Antoine Rozner	−25 (63-69-67-64=263)	−23 (65-69-65-66=265)
5	7 Jun 2021	(Netherlands) Darius van Driel	Porsche European Open	(England) Marcus Armitage	−8 (72-71-65=208)	−6 (71-69-70=210)
6	5 Sep 2021	(Poland) Adrian Meronk (2)	DS Automobiles Italian Open	(Denmark) Nicolai Højgaard	−13 (66-69-65-71=271)	−12 (70-69-67-66=272)
7	14 Nov 2021	(Italy) Francesco Laporta (2)	Aviv Dubai Championship	(Denmark) Joachim B. Hansen	−23 (63-67-67-68=265)	−22 (66-64-67-69=266)

== See also ==
- 2019 European Tour Qualifying School graduates
