= Garrick Higgo =

South African professional golfer (born 1999)

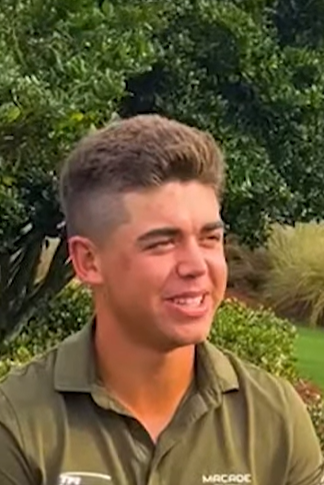

Personal information
- Nationality: South Africa
- Born: 12 May 1999 (age 27) Johannesburg, South Africa
- Height: 6 ft 0 in (183 cm)
- Weight: 185 lb (84 kg)
- Spouse: Chandre Janeke (m. 2023)

Career
- Sport: Golf
- College: University of Nevada-Las Vegas
- Turned professional: 2019
- Current tours: PGA Tour; European Tour; Sunshine Tour
- Former tours: Challenge Tour; Big Easy Tour
- Professional wins: 8
- Highest ranking: 38 (20 June 2021) (as of 25 October 2026)

Number of wins by tour
- PGA Tour: 2
- European Tour: 3
- Sunshine Tour: 2
- Challenge Tour: 1
- Other: 1

Best results in major championships
- Masters Tournament: CUT: 2022
- PGA Championship: T55: 2025
- U.S. Open: CUT: 2021
- The Open Championship: T47: 2022

Achievements and awards
- Sunshine Tour Rookie of the Year: 2019–20

Garrick Higgo (born 12 May 1999) is a South African professional golfer who currently plays on the PGA Tour, European Tour and the Sunshine Tour. He has won three times on the European Tour, winning the 2020 Open de Portugal and the Gran Canaria Lopesan Open as well as the Canary Islands Championship in 2021.

Higgo won his first PGA Tour title in his second start, at the Palmetto Championship. He became a two-time winner on the PGA Tour in 2025 when he won the Corales Puntacana Championship in the Dominican Republic.

== Early life and amateur career ==
Higgo was born on 12 May 1999 in Johannesburg, South Africa to Susan and Michael Higgo. Higgo has two siblings, Calista and Michael.

Higgo started playing golf socially with his father at a very young age and developed an early passion for the game. In 2008, when Higgo was aged 9, his father died in a car crash.

Higgo attended Paul Roos Gymnasium in the town of Stellenbosch, South Africa. He has been mentored by South African golfer, Gary Player throughout his career and often meets with Player to discuss course and play strategies.

Higgo attended the University of Nevada-Las Vegas in 2017 and 2018, turning professional during his sophomore year.

== Professional career ==
In 2019, Higgo turned professional. He won twice in his first full season on the Sunshine Tour, at the Sun City Challenge and the season-ending Tour Championship. He also recorded a runner-up finish in the Challenge Tour co-sanctioned Cape Town Open during the 2019–20 season and finished 6th on the Order of Merit.

Higgo secured a place on the Challenge Tour for the 2020 season by making the cut at the European Tour Qualifying School. In September 2020, at the Open de Portugal, a dual-ranking event on the European and Challenge tours, he shot a bogey-free final round of 65 to win by one stroke and gain a one-year exemption on the European Tour.

In April 2021, Higgo secured his second European Tour victory at the Gran Canaria Lopesan Open. He won the event with an aggregate score of 255, beating Andy Sullivan's record of 257 previously set in 2020. Two weeks later, Higgo won again in the Canary Islands, at the Canary Islands Championship; a final score of 257 (27 under par) saw him win by six shots ahead of Maverick Antcliff.

In June 2021, Higgo won the PGA Tour's Palmetto Championship in South Carolina by one stroke. With the win, Higgo won more than $1,300,000 and secured PGA Tour membership through the end of the 2023 season.

In April 2025, Higgo shot 14-under 274 to win the Corales Puntacana Championship. This was his second PGA Tour victory and secured him a two-year exemption on tour.

At the 2026 PGA Championship, Higgo was assessed a two-stroke penalty for arriving to his opening round tee time one minute late. He said in an interview following the round: "I was there on time, but the rule is, if you’re one second late, you’re late. So if you think about it, I was there on time, if you know what I mean." He ultimately missed the cut by one stroke. After the PGA Championship, Higgo parted ways with his caddie Austin Gaugert, who was on his bag for his win at the 2025 Corales Puntacana Championship.

== Personal life ==
Higgo lives in the town of Stellenbosch in the Western Cape province of South Africa with wife Chandre (SHUN-drae).

== Amateur wins ==
- 2016 Curro South African Juniors International, Northern Amateur Open, Central Gauteng Open Stroke Play
- 2017 Nomads National Order of Merit (Coastal), Cape Province Open, The Bobby Locke Open, Harry Oppenheimer Trophy

== Professional wins (8) ==
=== PGA Tour wins (2) ===
| No. | Date | Tournament | Winning score | Margin of victory | Runners-up |
|---|---|---|---|---|---|
| 1 | 13 Jun 2021 | Palmetto Championship | −11 (68-69-68-68=273) | 1 stroke | (United States) Chesson Hadley, (England) Tyrrell Hatton, (United States) Doc Redman, (United States) Hudson Swafford, (United States) Bo Van Pelt, (Venezuela) Jhonattan Vegas |
| 2 | 20 Apr 2025 | Corales Puntacana Championship | −14 (64-68-70-72=274) | 1 stroke | (United States) Joel Dahmen, (United States) Keith Mitchell, (Germany) Jeremy Paul, (United States) Michael Thorbjornsen, (Argentina) Alejandro Tosti |

=== European Tour wins (3) ===
| No. | Date | Tournament | Winning score | Margin of victory | Runner-up |
|---|---|---|---|---|---|
| 1 | 20 Sep 2020 | Open de Portugal^{1} | −19 (68-70-66-65=269) | 1 stroke | (Spain) Pep Anglès |
| 2 | 25 Apr 2021 | Gran Canaria Lopesan Open | −25 (65-64-63-63=255) | 3 strokes | (Germany) Maximilian Kieffer |
| 3 | 9 May 2021 | Canary Islands Championship | −27 (66-63-64-64=257) | 6 strokes | (Australia) Maverick Antcliff |

^{1}Dual-ranking event with the Challenge Tour

=== Sunshine Tour wins (2) ===
Legend
Tour Championships (1)
Other Sunshine Tour (1)

| No. | Date | Tournament | Winning score | Margin of victory | Runner-up |
|---|---|---|---|---|---|
| 1 | 7 Jun 2019 | Sun City Challenge | −7 (69-71-69=209) | 1 stroke | (South Africa) Ockie Strydom |
| 2 | 23 Feb 2020 | The Tour Championship | −19 (67-70-66-66=269) | 1 stroke | (South Africa) Haydn Porteous |

=== Challenge Tour wins (1) ===
| No. | Date | Tournament | Winning score | Margin of victory | Runner-up |
|---|---|---|---|---|---|
| 1 | 20 Sep 2020 | Open de Portugal^{1} | −19 (68-70-66-65=269) | 1 stroke | (Spain) Pep Anglès |

^{1}Dual-ranking event with the European Tour

=== Big Easy Tour wins (1) ===
| No. | Date | Tournament | Winning score | Margin of victory | Runners-up |
|---|---|---|---|---|---|
| 1 | 15 May 2019 | Big Easy Challenge 3 | −8 (66-70-72=208) | 1 stroke | (South Africa) Clinton Grobler, (South Africa) Martin Vorster (a) |

== Results in major championships ==
| Tournament | 2021 | 2022 | 2023 | 2024 | 2025 | 2026 |
|---|---|---|---|---|---|---|
| Masters Tournament | | CUT | | | | |
| PGA Championship | T64 | CUT | | | T55 | CUT |
| U.S. Open | CUT | | | | | |
| The Open Championship | CUT | T47 | | | | |

Did not play

CUT = missed the half-way cut
"T" = tied

== Results in The Players Championship ==
| Tournament | 2022 | 2023 | 2024 | 2025 | 2026 |
|---|---|---|---|---|---|
| The Players Championship | CUT | T44 | WD | | CUT |

Did not play

CUT = missed the halfway cut
WD = withdrew
"T" indicates a tie for a place

== Results in World Golf Championships ==
| Tournament | 2021 |
|---|---|
| Championship | |
| Match Play | |
| Invitational | WD |
| Champions | NT^{1} |

^{1}Cancelled due to COVID-19 pandemic

Did not play

WD = withdrew
NT = No tournament

== Team appearances ==
Amateur

- Junior Presidents Cup (representing the International team): 2017
