= Antoine Rozner =

French professional golfer (born 1993)

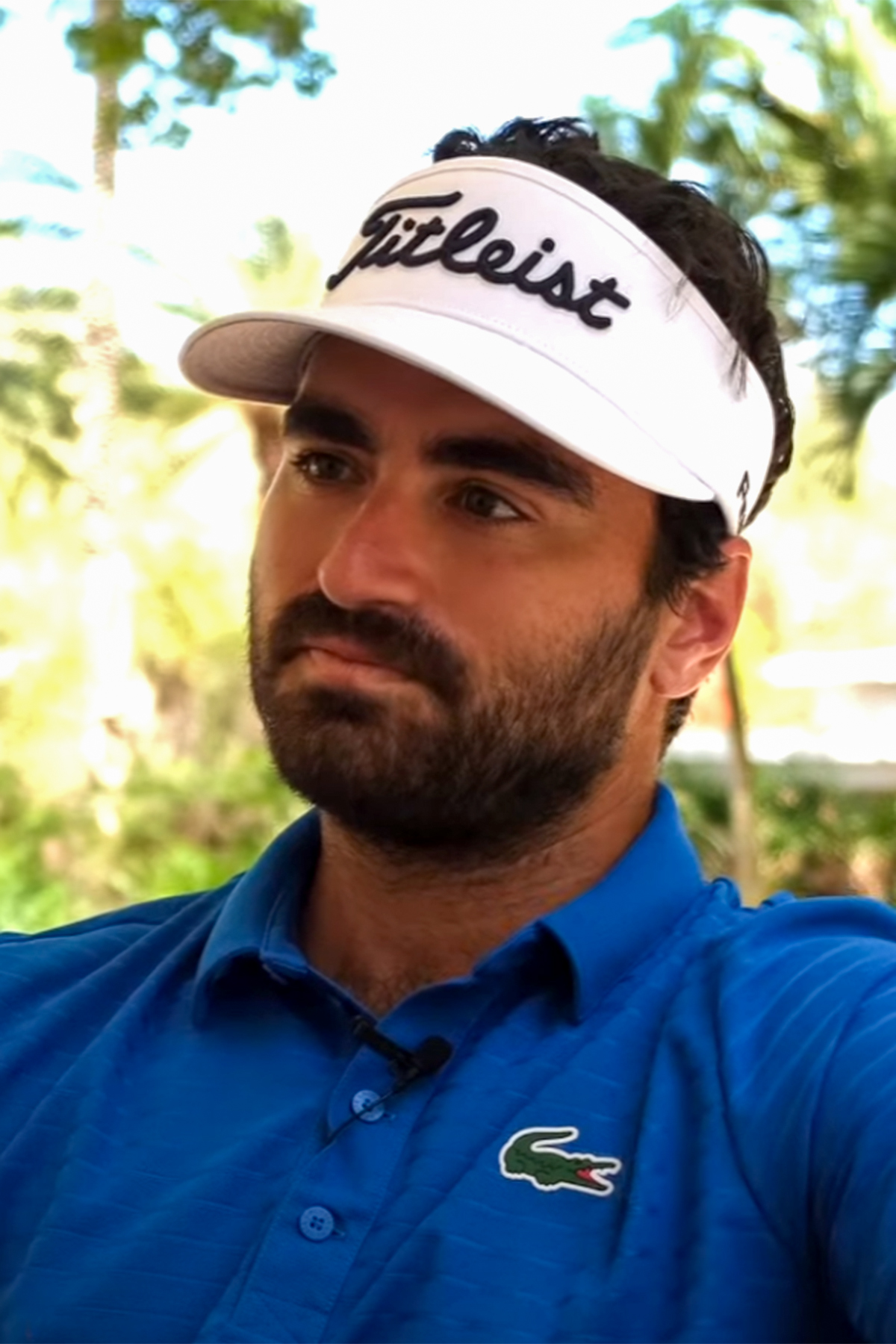
- Rozner in 2023

Personal information
- Nationality: France
- Born: 12 February 1993 (age 33) Paris, France

Career
- Sport: Golf
- College: University of Missouri–Kansas City
- Turned professional: 2016
- Current tours: PGA Tour; European Tour
- Former tours: Challenge Tour; Alps Tour
- Professional wins: 5
- Highest ranking: 63 (14 March 2021) (as of 25 October 2026)

Number of wins by tour
- European Tour: 3
- Sunshine Tour: 1
- Challenge Tour: 2

Best results in major championships
- Masters Tournament: DNP
- PGA Championship: CUT: 2021
- U.S. Open: DNP
- The Open Championship: T20: 2023

Achievements and awards
- European Tour Graduate of the Year: 2020

Antoine Rozner (born 12 February 1993) is a French professional golfer who plays on the European Tour. He has won three times on the tour, including wins at the Golf in Dubai Championship in December 2020 and the Commercial Bank Qatar Masters in March 2021. He has also won twice on the second-tier Challenge Tour.

== Amateur career ==
Rozner attended University of Missouri–Kansas City from 2012 to 2016, winning six times. He played in the 2016 NCAA Division I Men's Golf Championship finishing in a tie for 8th place in the individual competition. He represented Europe in the 2016 Arnold Palmer Cup, winning all his four matches and represented France in the 2016 Eisenhower Trophy.

== Professional career ==
Rozner turned professional after the 2016 Eisenhower Trophy. At the end of 2016, he was joint winner of the Alps Tour Q-school to gain a place on the tour for 2017. He had a successful season finishing runner-up twice. Together with three other top-5 finishes he finished third in the Order of Merit to gain a place on the Challenge Tour for 2018.

Rozner played in 22 tournaments on the 2018 Challenge Tour, making the cut 14 times. He was a joint runner-up in the Open de Portugal behind Dimitrios Papadatos and tied for fourth in the Le Vaudreuil Golf Challenge, finishing the season 45th in the Order of Merit.

Rozner played in two events in the early part of the 2019 Pro Golf Tour season, finishing runner-up on each occasion. In May, he won two tournaments on the Challenge Tour, the Challenge de España and the Prague Golf Challenge to lead the Order of Merit. He finished the season 8th in the Order of Merit to earn a place on the 2020 European Tour.

In December 2020, Rozner won the Golf in Dubai Championship on the Fire Course at the Jumeirah Golf Estates. He shot a final round 64 to overtake 54-hole leader Andy Sullivan.

In March 2021, Rozner holed a 60-foot birdie putt on the last hole at the Commercial Bank Qatar Masters to win by one shot for his second European Tour victory.

In December 2022, Rozner won the AfrAsia Bank Mauritius Open by five shots to claim his third victory on the European Tour.

== Personal life ==
Rozner's older brother Olivier is also a professional golfer. Olivier won the Adamstal Open on the 2015 Pro Golf Tour.

== Amateur wins ==
- 2014 Grand Prix de Chiberta, Championnat de France - Coupe Ganay, Price's "Give 'Em Five" Invitational
- 2015 Desert Shootout, Championnat de France - Coupe Ganay, Mark Simpson Invitational, Price's "Give 'Em Five" Invitational
- 2016 Desert Shootout, WAC Championship

== Professional wins (5) ==
=== European Tour wins (3) ===
No.	Date	Tournament	Winning score	Margin of victory	Runner(s)-up
1	5 Dec 2020	Golf in Dubai Championship	−25 (63-69-67-64=263)	2 strokes	(Italy) Francesco Laporta, (France) Mike Lorenzo-Vera, (England) Andy Sullivan, (England) Matt Wallace
2	14 Mar 2021	Commercial Bank Qatar Masters	−8 (69-72-68-67=276)	1 stroke	(India) Gaganjeet Bhullar, (South Africa) Darren Fichardt, (Italy) Guido Migliozzi
3	18 Dec 2022 (2023 season)	AfrAsia Bank Mauritius Open^{1}	−19 (70-64-68-67=269)	5 strokes	(Spain) Alfredo García-Heredia

^{1}Co-sanctioned by the Sunshine Tour

European Tour playoff record (0–1)

No.	Year	Tournament	Opponents	Result
1	2019	AfrAsia Bank Mauritius Open	(Denmark) Rasmus Højgaard, (Italy) Renato Paratore	Højgaard won with eagle on third extra hole Paratore eliminated by birdie on first hole

=== Challenge Tour wins (2) ===
No.	Date	Tournament	Winning score	Margin of victory	Runners-up
1	5 May 2019	Challenge de España	−13 (69-73-67-66=275)	4 strokes	(Finland) Antti Ahokas, (Spain) Sebastián García Rodríguez, (Denmark) Rasmus Højgaard, (Denmark) Martin Simonsen, (Sweden) Joel Sjöholm
2	12 May 2019	Prague Golf Challenge	−17 (70-65-68-68=271)	7 strokes	(England) Richard Bland, (France) Mathieu Fenasse, (Denmark) Mark Haastrup, (Denmark) Martin Simonsen

== Results in major championships ==
Tournament	2021	2022	2023	2024	2025	2026
Masters Tournament						
PGA Championship	CUT					
U.S. Open						
The Open Championship	T59		T20		T59	CUT

Did not play

CUT = missed the half-way cut
"T" = tied

== Results in World Golf Championships ==
Tournament	2021
Championship	
Match Play	T18
Invitational	
Champions	NT^{1}

^{1}Cancelled due to COVID-19 pandemic

Did not play

"T" = Tied
NT = No tournament

== Team appearances ==
Amateur

- The Spirit International Amateur Golf Championship (representing France): 2015
- European Amateur Team Championship (representing France): 2015, 2016
- Arnold Palmer Cup (representing Europe): 2016 (winners)
- Eisenhower Trophy (representing France): 2016

Professional

- Team Cup (representing Continental Europe): 2023 (winners), 2025

== See also ==
- 2019 Challenge Tour graduates
- 2024 Race to Dubai dual card winners
