= Mark Edgar Thomas Robinson =

British artist

Mark Edgar Thomas Robinson (born 1960) is a British artist specializing in Contemporary Golf Paintings, who was the first official Artist in residence for the season ending, PGA European Tour 'Race to Dubai' Final 2009–2013.

Mark Robinson was born in Belfast, Northern Ireland and brought up in Garvagh, Northern Ireland, until six years of age. His family moved to Luton, Bedfordshire, England in 66 and he was educated at state & public schools. After Bedford School, Robinson Studied Fine Art at Luton University. A move to London with fellow friends, all X art students they formed the band 'Spandau Ballet'. The original 'Spandau Ballet', was set up by Mike Austin, David Wardhill & Mark Robinson (Dave Later joined The Passions). After several years touring as a lighting designer for top rock bands, including, Alvin Lee, Praying Mantis, Prince and many others Robinson returned to full time education to study Theatre Set and Costume Design. Robinson then spent thirty years experimenting in Theatre, Music and Painting. His focus turned to Golf Portraits in 2007.

Mark Robinson was the first artist to be invited to paint at the season ending Race to Dubai Tournament & to Exhibit his Swing Portraits in the Village.

== Exhibitions ==
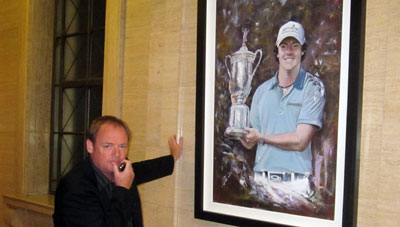
- 'Open Champions'. Solo Exhibition by Mark Robinson, Stormont, Belfast, 2011. Rory McIlroy portrait
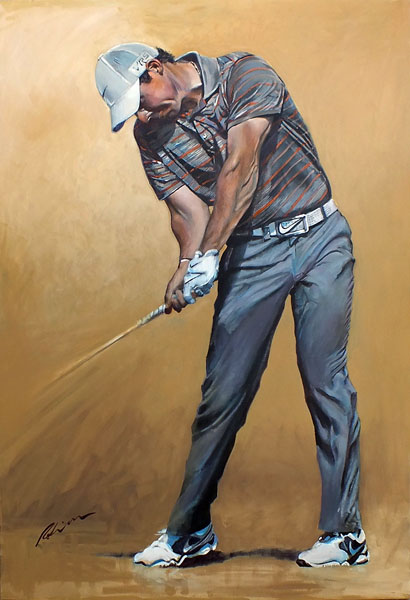
  Rory McIlroy swing portrait by Mark Robinson
  'Golfing Legends' at the Northern Ireland Assembly, 26 October 2011, Parliament Buildings on the Stormont Estate
- Mark Robinson was invited to Exhibit by William Hay, Baron Hay of Ballyore Speaker of the N.I. Assembly.
- 2013 DP World Tour Championship 2013 - PGA European Tour Tournament Village Exhibition as Official Artist in Residence (AIR).

=== List of Golf Tournaments as Artist in Residence ===
- 2009 Dubai World Championship, 'Earth' Golf Course designed by Greg Norman, at Jumeirah Golf Estates, Dubai. UAE.
- 2010 Dubai World Championship, 'Earth' Golf Course designed by Greg Norman, at Jumeirah Golf Estates, Dubai, UAE.
- 2011 DP World Tour Championship, 'Earth' Golf Course designed by Greg Norman, at Jumeirah Golf Estates, Dubai, UAE.
- 2012 DP World Tour Championship, 'Earth' Golf Course designed by Greg Norman, at Jumeirah Golf Estates, Dubai, UAE.
- 2013 DP World Tour Championship, 'Earth' Golf Course designed by Greg Norman, at Jumeirah Golf Estates, Dubai, UAE.
- 2011 Emirates Invitational Pro/Am, Yas Links GC Abu Dhabi, UAE
- 2012 Emirates Invitational Pro/Am, Yas Links GC Abu Dhabi, UAE
- 2012 European Challenge Tour Final, Al Badia G C, Intercontinental Hotels, Festival City, Dubai.
- 2013 European Challenge Tour, National Bank Of Oman Classic. Al Mouj G C, The Wave, Muscat, Oman
- 2013 European Challenge Tour Final, Al Badia G C, Intercontinental Hotels, Festival City, Dubai
