= Maverick Antcliff =

Australian professional golfer

Personal information
- Nationality: Australia
- Born: 7 April 1993 (age 33) Brisbane, Queensland, Australia

Career
- Sport: Golf
- College: University of Queensland; Augusta State University
- Turned professional: 2016
- Current tour: Asian Tour
- Former tours: European Tour; PGA Tour of Australasia; China Tour
- Professional wins: 3

Achievements and awards
- China Tour Order of Merit winner: 2019

Maverick Antcliff (born 7 April 1993) is an Australian professional golfer currently playing on the European Tour. In 2019, he won the China Tour Order of Merit, the same year he achieved his first three professional wins.

== Career ==
Antcliff hails from Beaudesert, Queensland, about an hour south of Brisbane, just like fellow golfer Jason Day. He attended Hills International College as a teenager.

Antcliff accepted a golf scholarship to Augusta State University, and played golf with the Jaguars' men's golf team 2013–2016. After turning pro in 2016 Antcliff found himself near the top of the leaderboard in a number of events on the Asian Tour and the PGA Tour of Australasia in 2017 and 2018, but wins proved elusive. His breakthrough came in 2019 when he claimed three wins from the first five events of the 2019 China Tour.

Following his dominant year on the China Tour where he recorded three wins, seven top fives, nine top tens and no missed cuts to win the Order of Merit with a points total that was nearly double the second-place finisher's, Antcliff earned his European Tour card for 2020.

In his rookie season, Antcliff finished tied third at the Dubai Duty Free Irish Open. He was runner-up at the 2021 Canary Islands Championship, behind Garrick Higgo, after which he rose to 208th in the Official World Golf Ranking.

== Professional wins (3) ==
=== China Tour wins (3) ===
No.	Date	Tournament	Winning score	Margin of victory	Runner(s)-up
1	21 Apr 2019	Boao Open	−16 (66-69-69-68=272)	6 strokes	(Taiwan) Ling Yung-lung
2	28 Apr 2019	Shenzhou Peninsula Open	−16 (71-69-66-66=272)	4 strokes	(Taiwan) K. P. Lin, (China) Jin Cheng, (New Zealand) Kieran Muir
3	30 Jun 2019	Beijing Open	−15 (69-65-72-67=273)	4 strokes	(Sweden) Andreas Gronkvist, (China) Jin Cheng, (Australia) Bryden Macpherson, (China) Zhou Guowu

== Team appearances ==
Amateur

- Australian Men's Interstate Teams Matches (representing Queensland): 2011
