= Team Cup (golf) =

Golf tournament

Coordinates: 24.4203°N 54.5269°E

Tournament information
- Location: Abu Dhabi, United Arab Emirates
- Established: 2023
- Course: Abu Dhabi Golf Club
- Par: 72
- Length: 7,642 yards (6,988 m)
- Tour: European Tour (unofficial event)
- Format: Match play
- Prize fund: €2,000,000
- Month played: January

Current champion
- Great Britain and Ireland

Location map
- Location in the United Arab Emirates

The Team Cup (previously known as the Hero Cup for sponsorship reasons) is a golf tournament between teams of professional male golfers; one team representing Great Britain and Ireland, the other team representing Continental Europe. The tournament was first played in 2023, but the competition is reminiscent of the Seve Trophy which was held eight times between 2000 and 2013.

For the tournament's first iteration, a sponsorship deal was reached with the Indian two-wheeler manufacturers Hero MotoCorp. Members of the winning European team each earned US$125,000, with those on the losing GB&I team each receiving US$75,000.

== Schedule ==
The event is an "approved special event" on the European Tour. The prize money does not count towards the Race to Dubai (previously the Order of Merit).

The 2023 event was the first. After Luke Donald was appointed as Ryder Cup Captain, he was keen to reinstate a team match play contest to give playing and leadership experience to future Ryder Cup players, vice-captains and captains.

== Format ==
The Team Cup is a team event for professional male golfers; one team representing Great Britain and Ireland, the other team representing Continental Europe.

The cup is contested over three days (Friday to Sunday) and consists of one session of foursomes matches, two sessions of fourball matches and one session of singles matches, with all 20 players taking part in each session.

== Team qualification and selection ==
Two playing captains were chosen by the European Tour.

Eligibility for the event is similar that of the European team in the Ryder Cup. Players have to be European and be a member of the European Tour.

In the inaugural tournament, all players were "captain's picks", players chosen at the discretion of Ryder Cup Captain Luke Donald in consultation with the team captains.

== Results ==
Year	Winners	Score	GB&I captain	Europe captain	Venue
Team Cup
2025	Great Britain and Ireland	17–8	Justin Rose	Francesco Molinari	Abu Dhabi GC, UAE
Hero Cup
2023	Continental Europe	14 1/2–10 1/2	Tommy Fleetwood	Francesco Molinari	Abu Dhabi GC, UAE

== Appearances ==
The following are those selected to play in at least one of the matches.

=== Great Britain and Ireland ===
- 2023
  - (England) Tommy Fleetwood (c)
  - (Scotland) Ewen Ferguson
  - (England) Tyrrell Hatton
  - (Republic of Ireland) Shane Lowry
  - (Scotland) Robert MacIntyre
  - (England) Richard Mansell
  - (Republic of Ireland) Séamus Power
  - (England) Callum Shinkwin
  - (England) Jordan Smith
  - (England) Matt Wallace
- 2025
  - (England) Justin Rose (c)
  - (England) Laurie Canter
  - (England) Tommy Fleetwood
  - (England) Tyrrell Hatton
  - (England) Matthew Jordan
  - (Northern Ireland) Tom McKibbin
  - (England) Aaron Rai
  - (England) Jordan Smith
  - (England) Matt Wallace
  - (England) Paul Waring

=== Continental Europe ===
- 2023
  - (Italy) Francesco Molinari (c)
  - (Belgium) Thomas Detry
  - (Denmark) Nicolai Højgaard
  - (Poland) Adrian Meronk
  - (Italy) Guido Migliozzi
  - (Sweden) Alex Norén
  - (France) Victor Perez
  - (Belgium) Thomas Pieters
  - (France) Antoine Rozner
  - (Austria) Sepp Straka
- 2025
  - (Italy) Francesco Molinari (c)
  - (France) Julien Guerrier (Note: Guerrier replaced Nicolai Højgaard due to an illness.)
  - (Denmark) Rasmus Højgaard
  - (France) Romain Langasque
  - (Italy) Matteo Manassero
  - (Denmark) Rasmus Neergaard-Petersen
  - (Denmark) Niklas Nørgaard
  - (Denmark) Thorbjørn Olesen
  - (France) Matthieu Pavon
  - (France) Antoine Rozner

== See also ==
- Seve Trophy
