= 2019 China Tour =

Golf tour season

2019 China Tour season
- Duration: 18 April 2019 – 1 December 2019
- Number of official events: 12
- Most wins: (Australia) Maverick Antcliff (3)
- Order of Merit: (Australia) Maverick Antcliff

The 2019 China Tour was the sixth season of the China Tour, the main professional golf tour in China since separating from PGA Tour China in 2017.

== Schedule ==
The following table lists official events during the 2019 season.

Date	Tournament	Location	Purse (CN¥)	Winner (Note: The number in brackets after each winner's name is the number of China Tour events they had won up to and including that tournament.)	OWGR points	Other tours (Note: CHA − Challenge Tour.)
21 Apr	Boao Open	Hainan	700,000	(Australia) Maverick Antcliff (1)	6	
28 Apr	Shenzhou Peninsula Open	Hainan	700,000	(Australia) Maverick Antcliff (2)	6	
1 Jun	Wuhan Optics Valley Open	Hubei	700,000	(South Korea) Jung Woo-jin (1)	6	
9 Jun	Lushan Open	Jiangxi	700,000	(Hong Kong) Hak Shunyat (2)	6	
30 Jun	Beijing Open	Beijing	700,000	(Australia) Maverick Antcliff (3)	6	
7 Jul	Tianjin Binhai Forest Open	Tianjin	700,000	(United States) Nicolas Paez (1)	6	
25 Aug	Huangshan Open	Anhui	700,000	(New Zealand) Kieran Muir (1)	6	
1 Sep	Hangzhou International Championship	Zhejiang	700,000	(China) Chao Haimeng (2)	6	
8 Sep	Hunan Taohuayuan Open	Hunan	700,000	(China) Zhang Huilin (2)	6	
20 Oct	Hainan Open	Hainan	US$350,000	(Italy) Francesco Laporta (n/a)	13	CHA
27 Oct	Foshan Open	Guangdong	US$500,000	(China) Bai Zhengkai (1)	13	CHA
1 Dec	China Tour Championship	Chongqing	1,200,000	(Thailand) Suteepat Prateeptienchai (1)	8	

== Order of Merit ==
The Order of Merit was based on prize money won during the season, calculated in Renminbi. The leading player on the Order of Merit earned status to play on the 2020 European Tour.

Position	Player	Prize money (CN¥)	Status earned
1	(Australia) Maverick Antcliff	710,370	Promoted to European Tour
2	(Thailand) Suteepat Prateeptienchai	383,216	
3	(China) Zhang Huilin	335,623	
4	(China) Liu Yanwei	332,841	
5	(New Zealand) Kieran Muir	245,355	

== See also ==
- 2019 PGA Tour China
