= Gran Canaria Lopesan Open =

Golf tournament

Coordinates: 27.751°N 15.617°W

Tournament information
- Location: Gran Canaria, Spain
- Established: 2021
- Course: Meloneras Golf
- Par: 70
- Length: 6,715 yards (6,140 m)
- Tour: European Tour
- Format: Stroke play
- Prize fund: €1,500,000
- Month played: April
- Final year: 2021

Tournament record score
- Aggregate: 255 Garrick Higgo (2021)
- To par: −25 as above

Final champion
- (South Africa) Garrick Higgo

Location map
- Location in the Canary Islands Location in Gran Canaria

The Gran Canaria Lopesan Open was a professional golf tournament held 22–25 April 2021 at Meloneras Golf in Gran Canaria, Spain.

The tournament was intended to be a one-off event and was played the week before the Tenerife Open, after that event was rescheduled following the postponement of the Portugal Masters, creating a two-week swing of events in the Canary Islands.

On 5 April 2021, it was announced that Rafa Cabrera-Bello would host the event.

Garrick Higgo won the event with an aggregate score of 255. This broke the European Tour aggregate scoring record, beating Andy Sullivan's record of 257 previously set in 2020.

== Winners ==
Year	Winner	Score	To par	Margin of victory	Runner-up
2021	(South Africa) Garrick Higgo	255	−25	3 strokes	(Germany) Maximilian Kieffer
