= 2021 WGC-Dell Technologies Match Play =

Tournament information
- Dates: March 24–28, 2021
- Location: Austin, Texas, U.S. 30.343°N 97.797°W
- Course: Austin Country Club
- Tours: PGA Tour; European Tour; Japan Golf Tour
- Format: Match play – 18 holes

Statistics
- Par: 71
- Length: 7,108 yards (6,500 m)
- Field: 64 players
- Prize fund: $10,500,000
- Winner's share: $1,820,000

Champion
- (United States) Billy Horschel
- def. Scottie Scheffler 2 & 1

Location map
- Location in the United States Location in Texas

The 2021 WGC-Dell Technologies Match Play was the 22nd WGC Match Play, and was played on March 24–28 at Austin Country Club in Austin, Texas. It was the second of the World Golf Championships in 2021.

Billy Horschel defeated Scottie Scheffler in the final, 2 and 1, for his first WGC win.

== Course layout ==
Austin Country Club

Hole	1	2	3	4	5	6	7	8	9	Out	10	11	12	13	14	15	16	17	18	In	Total
Yards	394	470	440	185	370	590	201	498	490	3,638	393	194	578	317	465	440	585	150	368	3,490	7,128
Par	4	4	4	3	4	5	3	4	4	35	4	3	5	4	4	4	5	3	4	36	71

== Field ==
The following players made up the field, which consisted of the top 64 players available from the Official World Golf Ranking on March 15. They are listed with their world ranking as of March 15 in parentheses; seedings were determined by their world ranking as of March 22.

- Dustin Johnson (1)
- Justin Thomas (2)
- Jon Rahm (3)
- Collin Morikawa (4)
- Bryson DeChambeau (5)
- Xander Schauffele (6)
- Patrick Reed (7)
- Tyrrell Hatton (8)
- Patrick Cantlay (9)
- Webb Simpson (10)
- Rory McIlroy (11)
- Tony Finau (13)
- Viktor Hovland (14)
- Daniel Berger (15)
- Matt Fitzpatrick (16)
- Paul Casey (17)
- Im Sung-jae (18)
- Lee Westwood (19)
- Harris English (20)
- Matthew Wolff (21)
- Tommy Fleetwood (22)
- Louis Oosthuizen (23)
- Hideki Matsuyama (24)
- Ryan Palmer (26)
- Cameron Smith (27)
- Abraham Ancer (28)
- Joaquín Niemann (29)
- Kevin Na (30)
- Jason Kokrak (31)
- Scottie Scheffler (32)
- Victor Perez (33)
- Billy Horschel (34)
- Christiaan Bezuidenhout (35)
- Kevin Kisner (36)
- Max Homa (37)
- Marc Leishman (39)
- Shane Lowry (40)
- Corey Conners (41)
- Sergio García (42)
- Will Zalatoris (43)
- Robert MacIntyre (44)
- Bernd Wiesberger (45)
- Carlos Ortiz (46)
- Jason Day (47)
- Kim Si-woo (48)
- Lanto Griffin (49)
- Brendon Todd (50)
- Jordan Spieth (52)
- Mackenzie Hughes (53)
- Matt Kuchar (54)
- Matt Wallace (55)
- Bubba Watson (57)
- Brian Harman (58)
- Kevin Streelman (59)
- Russell Henley (60)
- Sebastián Muñoz (61)
- Andy Sullivan (62)
- Antoine Rozner (63)
- Talor Gooch (64)
- Ian Poulter (65)
- Erik van Rooyen (66)
- Adam Long (67)
- J. T. Poston (68)
- Dylan Frittelli (69)
- Brooks Koepka (12), Justin Rose (38), Adam Scott (25), Gary Woodland (51) and Tiger Woods (56) did not play

== Format ==
The 64 players were placed into four seeded pools, the 16 highest ranked players as of March 22 in Pool A, the next 16 in Pool B, etc. The top seeds (Pool A) were placed into 16 groups in order, with the groups completed by means of a random draw of one player from each of the remaining pools.

Each group was decided by a round-robin match play matches played on Wednesday, Thursday and Friday, with one point awarded for a win and half a point for a tie. The sixteen group winners advanced to the knockout stage. If two or more players were tied on points at the end of the group stage, there was a sudden death stroke play playoff between the tied players to determine the winner of the group.

The round of sixteen were played on Saturday morning, with the quarterfinals on Saturday afternoon. The semifinals were played on Sunday morning, and the final and third place playoff were played on Sunday afternoon. In total, the winner played seven rounds of golf.

=== Pools ===
Pool A
Seed	Player	OWGR
1	(United States) Dustin Johnson	1
2	(United States) Justin Thomas	2
3	(Spain) Jon Rahm	3
4	(United States) Collin Morikawa	4
5	(United States) Bryson DeChambeau	5
6	(United States) Xander Schauffele	6
7	(United States) Patrick Reed	7
8	(England) Tyrrell Hatton	8
9	(United States) Webb Simpson	9
10	(United States) Patrick Cantlay	10
11	(Northern Ireland) Rory McIlroy	11
12	(United States) Tony Finau	13
13	(Norway) Viktor Hovland	14
14	(United States) Daniel Berger	15
15	(England) Matt Fitzpatrick	16
16	(South Korea) Im Sung-jae	17

Pool B
Seed	Player	OWGR
17	(England) Paul Casey	18
18	(England) Lee Westwood	19
19	(United States) Harris English	20
20	(United States) Matthew Wolff	21
21	(England) Tommy Fleetwood	22
22	(South Africa) Louis Oosthuizen	23
23	(Japan) Hideki Matsuyama	24
24	(United States) Ryan Palmer	26
25	(Australia) Cameron Smith	27
26	(Chile) Joaquín Niemann	28
27	(Mexico) Abraham Ancer	29
28	(United States) Kevin Na	30
29	(United States) Jason Kokrak	31
30	(United States) Scottie Scheffler	32
31	(France) Victor Perez	33
32	(United States) Billy Horschel	34

Pool C
Seed	Player	OWGR
33	(South Africa) Christiaan Bezuidenhout	35
34	(United States) Kevin Kisner	36
35	(United States) Max Homa	37
36	(Australia) Marc Leishman	39
37	(Canada) Corey Conners	40
38	(Republic of Ireland) Shane Lowry	41
39	(Spain) Sergio García	42
40	(United States) Will Zalatoris	43
41	(Scotland) Robert MacIntyre	44
42	(Mexico) Carlos Ortiz	45
43	(Austria) Bernd Wiesberger	46
44	(Australia) Jason Day	47
45	(South Korea) Kim Si-woo	48
46	(United States) Lanto Griffin	50
47	(United States) Brendon Todd	51
48	(Canada) Mackenzie Hughes	53

Pool D
Seed	Player	OWGR
49	(United States) Jordan Spieth	54
50	(United States) Russell Henley	55
51	(England) Matt Wallace	56
52	(United States) Matt Kuchar	57
53	(United States) Kevin Streelman	58
54	(United States) Brian Harman	59
55	(United States) Bubba Watson	60
56	(Colombia) Sebastián Muñoz	62
57	(England) Andy Sullivan	63
58	(France) Antoine Rozner	64
59	(United States) Talor Gooch	65
60	(England) Ian Poulter	66
61	(United States) Adam Long	67
62	(South Africa) Erik van Rooyen	68
63	(United States) J. T. Poston	70
64	(South Africa) Dylan Frittelli	71

== Results ==
=== Group stage ===
Group stage matches were played from March 24 to March 26. Only one player qualified from pool A, with 4 qualifying from pool B, 3 from pool C and 8 from pool D.

Group 1
Round	Winner	Score	Loser
1	Johnson	2 up	Long
1	MacIntyre	2 & 1	Na
2	Johnson vs MacIntyre – tied		
2	Long	2 & 1	Na
3	Na	1 up	Johnson
3	MacIntyre vs Long – tied		

Seed	Player	W	L	T	Points	Finish
41	(Scotland) Robert MacIntyre	1	0	2	2	1
1	(United States) Dustin Johnson	1	1	1	1.5	T2
61	(United States) Adam Long	1	1	1	1.5	T2
28	(United States) Kevin Na	1	2	0	1	4

Group 2
Round	Winner	Score	Loser
1	Kuchar	3 & 2	Thomas
1	Kisner	2 & 1	Oosthuizen
2	Kisner	2 & 1	Thomas
2	Kuchar	1 up	Oosthuizen
3	Thomas	3 & 2	Oosthuizen
3	Kuchar	2 & 1	Kisner

Seed	Player	W	L	T	Points	Finish
52	(United States) Matt Kuchar	3	0	0	3	1
34	(United States) Kevin Kisner	2	1	0	2	2
2	(United States) Justin Thomas	1	2	0	1	3
22	(South Africa) Louis Oosthuizen	0	3	0	0	4

Group 3
Round	Winner	Score	Loser
1	Rahm	1 up	Muñoz
1	Palmer	4 & 2	Lowry
2	Rahm	2 up	Lowry
2	Palmer	2 & 1	Muñoz
3	Rahm vs Palmer – tied		
3	Lowry	3 & 2	Muñoz

Seed	Player	W	L	T	Points	Finish
3	(Spain) Jon Rahm	2	0	1	2.5	1
24	(United States) Ryan Palmer	2	0	1	2.5	2
38	(Republic of Ireland) Shane Lowry	1	2	0	1	3
56	(Colombia) Sebastián Muñoz	0	3	0	0	4

- Rahm defeated Palmer on the second hole of a
  sudden-death playoff with a birdie.

Group 4
Round	Winner	Score	Loser
1	Morikawa vs Poston – tied		
1	Horschel	1 up	Homa
2	Homa	2 & 1	Morikawa
2	Poston	4 & 2	Horschel
3	Horschel	3 & 2	Morikawa
3	Homa	3 & 2	Poston

Seed	Player	W	L	T	Points	Finish
32	(United States) Billy Horschel	2	1	0	2	1
35	(United States) Max Homa	2	1	0	2	2
63	(United States) J. T. Poston	1	1	1	1.5	3
4	(United States) Collin Morikawa	0	2	1	0.5	4

- Horschel defeated Homa on the third hole of a
  sudden-death playoff with a birdie.

Group 5
Round	Winner	Score	Loser
1	Rozner	2 up	DeChambeau
1	Fleetwood vs Kim – tied		
2	DeChambeau	2 & 1	Kim
2	Fleetwood	4 & 3	Rozner
3	Fleetwood	1 up	DeChambeau
3	Rozner	3 & 1	Kim

Seed	Player	W	L	T	Points	Finish
21	(England) Tommy Fleetwood	2	0	1	2.5	1
58	(France) Antoine Rozner	2	1	0	2	2
5	(United States) Bryson DeChambeau	1	2	0	1	3
45	(South Korea) Kim Si-woo	0	2	1	0.5	4

Group 6
Round	Winner	Score	Loser
1	Schauffele vs Sullivan – tied		
1	Scheffler	2 up	Day
2	Schauffele	2 & 1	Day
2	Scheffler vs Sullivan – tied		
3	Schauffele vs Scheffler – tied		
3	Day	2 & 1	Sullivan

Seed	Player	W	L	T	Points	Finish
30	(United States) Scottie Scheffler	1	0	2	2	1
6	(United States) Xander Schauffele	1	0	2	2	2
44	(Australia) Jason Day	1	2	0	1	T3
57	(England) Andy Sullivan	0	1	2	1	T3

- Scheffler defeated Schauffele on the second hole of a
  sudden-death playoff with a birdie.

Group 7
Round	Winner	Score	Loser
1	Reed vs Watson – tied		
1	Niemann vs Bezuidenhout – tied		
2	Reed	2 & 1	Bezuidenhout
2	Niemann vs Watson – tied		
3	Niemann	5 & 4	Reed
3	Watson	5 & 3	Bezuidenhout

Seed	Player	W	L	T	Points	Finish
55	(United States) Bubba Watson	1	0	2	2	1
26	(Chile) Joaquín Niemann	1	0	2	2	2
7	(United States) Patrick Reed	1	1	1	1.5	3
33	(South Africa) Christiaan Bezuidenhout	0	2	1	0.5	4

- Watson defeated Niemann on the second hole of a
  sudden-death playoff with a par.

Group 8
Round	Winner	Score	Loser
1	Hatton vs Wallace – tied		
1	García	4 & 3	Westwood
2	García	3 & 2	Hatton
2	Westwood	5 & 3	Wallace
3	Westwood	4 & 3	Hatton
3	Wallace	5 & 3	García

Seed	Player	W	L	T	Points	Finish
39	(Spain) Sergio García	2	1	0	2	1
18	(England) Lee Westwood	2	1	0	2	2
51	(England) Matt Wallace	1	1	1	1.5	3
8	(England) Tyrrell Hatton	0	2	1	0.5	4

- García defeated Westwood on the fourth hole of a
  sudden-death playoff with a hole-in-one.

Group 9
Round	Winner	Score	Loser
1	Simpson	6 & 5	Gooch
1	Hughes	3 & 2	Casey
2	Hughes	4 & 3	Simpson
2	Casey	3 & 2	Gooch
3	Simpson vs Casey – tied		
3	Hughes vs Gooch – tied		

Seed	Player	W	L	T	Points	Finish
48	(Canada) Mackenzie Hughes	2	0	1	2.5	1
9	(United States) Webb Simpson	1	1	1	1.5	T2
17	(England) Paul Casey	1	1	1	1.5	T2
59	(United States) Talor Gooch	0	2	1	0.5	4

Group 10
Round	Winner	Score	Loser
1	Cantlay	1 up	Harman
1	Ortiz	4 & 3	Matsuyama
2	Cantlay	1 up	Ortiz
2	Harman	1 up	Matsuyama
3	Matsuyama	4 & 2	Cantlay
3	Harman	3 & 2	Ortiz

Seed	Player	W	L	T	Points	Finish
54	(United States) Brian Harman	2	1	0	2	1
10	(United States) Patrick Cantlay	2	1	0	2	2
23	(Japan) Hideki Matsuyama	1	2	0	1	T3
42	(Mexico) Carlos Ortiz	1	2	0	1	T3

- Harman defeated Cantlay on the second hole of a
  sudden-death playoff with a par.

Group 11
Round	Winner	Score	Loser
1	Poulter	6 & 5	McIlroy
1	Smith	1 up	Griffin
2	McIlroy	4 & 3	Griffin
2	Poulter	1 up	Smith
3	McIlroy vs Smith – tied		
3	Poulter	2 & 1	Griffin

Seed	Player	W	L	T	Points	Finish
60	(England) Ian Poulter	3	0	0	3	1
25	(Australia) Cameron Smith	1	1	1	1.5	T2
11	(Northern Ireland) Rory McIlroy	1	1	1	1.5	T2
46	(United States) Lanto Griffin	0	3	0	0	4

Group 12
Round	Winner	Score	Loser
1	Frittelli	6 & 5	Finau
1	Kokrak	1 up	Zalatoris
2	Finau vs Zalatoris – tied		
2	Frittelli	3 & 2	Kokrak
3	Finau	2 up	Kokrak
3	Zalatoris	2 up	Frittelli

Seed	Player	W	L	T	Points	Finish
64	(South Africa) Dylan Frittelli	2	1	0	2	1
12	(United States) Tony Finau	1	1	1	1.5	T2
40	(United States) Will Zalatoris	1	1	1	1.5	T2
29	(United States) Jason Kokrak	1	2	0	1	4

Group 13
Round	Winner	Score	Loser
1	Streelman	4 & 2	Hovland
1	Ancer	3 & 2	Wiesberger
2	Wiesberger	4 & 2	Hovland
2	Ancer	2 & 1	Streelman
3	Hovland	1 up	Ancer
3	Streelman	1 up	Wiesberger

Seed	Player	W	L	T	Points	Finish
53	(United States) Kevin Streelman	2	1	0	2	1
27	(Mexico) Abraham Ancer	2	1	0	2	2
13	(Norway) Viktor Hovland	1	2	0	1	T3
43	(Austria) Bernd Wiesberger	1	2	0	1	T3

- Streelman defeated Ancer on the first hole of a
  sudden-death playoff with a birdie.

Group 14
Round	Winner	Score	Loser
1	Berger	6 & 4	van Rooyen
1	English	1 up	Todd
2	Todd	2 & 1	Berger
2	van Rooyen	2 & 1	English
3	Berger	4 & 2	English
3	van Rooyen	2 & 1	Todd

Seed	Player	W	L	T	Points	Finish
62	(South Africa) Erik van Rooyen	2	1	0	2	1
14	(United States) Daniel Berger	2	1	0	2	2
19	(United States) Harris English	1	2	0	1	T3
47	(United States) Brendon Todd	1	2	0	1	T3

- van Rooyen defeated Berger on the first hole of a
  sudden-death playoff with a par.

Group 15
Round	Winner	Score	Loser
1	Spieth	3 & 1	Fitzpatrick
1	Wolff	3 & 1	Conners
2	Fitzpatrick	5 & 4	Conners
2	Wolff vs Spieth – tied		
3	Fitzpatrick	3 & 2	Wolff
3	Spieth	3 & 2	Conners

Seed	Player	W	L	T	Points	Finish
49	(United States) Jordan Spieth	2	0	1	2.5	1
15	(England) Matt Fitzpatrick	2	1	0	2	2
20	(United States) Matthew Wolff	1	1	1	1.5	3
37	(Canada) Corey Conners	0	3	0	0	4

Group 16
Round	Winner	Score	Loser
1	Im	1 up	Henley
1	Perez	2 & 1	Leishman
2	Leishman	2 & 1	Im
2	Henley	4 & 3	Perez
3	Perez	2 & 1	Im
3	Leishman vs Henley – tied		

Seed	Player	W	L	T	Points	Finish
31	(France) Victor Perez	2	1	0	2	1
36	(Australia) Marc Leishman	1	1	1	1.5	T2
50	(United States) Russell Henley	1	1	1	1.5	T2
16	(South Korea) Im Sung-jae	1	2	0	1	4

=== Final 16 bracket ===
First round March 27 – morning
41	(Scotland) Robert MacIntyre
31	(France) Victor Perez	5&4
39	(Spain) Sergio García	2&1
48	(Canada) Mackenzie Hughes
32	(United States) Billy Horschel	3&1
53	(United States) Kevin Streelman
21	(England) Tommy Fleetwood	4&3
64	(South Africa) Dylan Frittelli
52	(United States) Matt Kuchar	1up
49	(United States) Jordan Spieth
55	(United States) Bubba Watson
54	(United States) Brian Harman	2&1
3	(Spain) Jon Rahm	3&2
62	(South Africa) Erik van Rooyen
30	(United States) Scottie Scheffler	5&4
60	(England) Ian Poulter

Quarterfinals; March 27 – afternoon
31	(France) Victor Perez	4&3
39	(Spain) Sergio García
32	(United States) Billy Horschel	19h
21	(England) Tommy Fleetwood
52	(United States) Matt Kuchar	2&1
54	(United States) Brian Harman
3	(Spain) Jon Rahm
30	(United States) Scottie Scheffler	3&1

Semifinals; March 28 – morning
31	(France) Victor Perez
32	(United States) Billy Horschel	3&2
52	(United States) Matt Kuchar
30	(United States) Scottie Scheffler	2&1

Final; March 28 – afternoon
32	(United States) Billy Horschel	2&1
30	(United States) Scottie Scheffler
Third place
31	(France) Victor Perez
52	(United States) Matt Kuchar	2&1

== Prize money breakdown ==
Place	Description	US ($)
1	Champion	1,820,000
2	Runner-up	1,150,000
3	Third place	740,000
4	Fourth place	600,000
T5	Losing quarter-finalists x 4	337,000
T9	Losing round of 16 x 8	189,000
17	Those with 2.5 points in pool play x 1	144,000
T18	Those with 2 points in pool play x 10	113,700
T28	Those with 1.5 points in pool play x 14	75,000
T42	Those with 1 point in pool play x 14	47,571
T56	Those with 0.5 points in pool play x 5	38,000
T61	Those with 0 points in pool play x 4	35,750
	Total	10,500,000
