= 2021 BMW PGA Championship =

Tournament information
- Dates: 9–12 September 2021
- Location: Virginia Water, Surrey, England; 51.40°N 0.59°W
- Courses: Wentworth Club (West Course)
- Tour: European Tour

Statistics
- Par: 72
- Length: 7,267 yards (6,645 m)
- Field: 144 players, 78 after cut
- Cut: 142 (−2)
- Prize fund: US$8,000,000
- Winner's share: US$1,330,000

Champion
- (United States) Billy Horschel
- 269 (−19)

Location map
- Location in England Location in Surrey

The 2021 BMW PGA Championship was the 67th edition of the BMW PGA Championship, an annual golf tournament on the European Tour, held 9–12 September at the West Course of Wentworth Club in Virginia Water, Surrey, England, a suburb southwest of London.

Billy Horschel won the event, carding a final-round 65 to finish one shot ahead of Kiradech Aphibarnrat, Laurie Canter and Jamie Donaldson. It was his second European Tour victory.

== Course layout ==
Wentworth Club, West Course
Tee	Rating/Slope	1	2	3	4	5	6	7	8	9	Out	10	11	12	13	14	15	16	17	18	In	Total
Yardage	n/a	473	154	459	552	203	418	396	400	449	3,504	184	408	520	470	174	491	383	610	523	3,763	7,267
Par		4	3	4	5	3	4	4	4	4	35	3	4	5	4	3	4	4	5	5	37	72

== Round summaries ==
=== First round ===
Thursday, 9 September 2021

Place	Player	Score	To par
T1	(Thailand) Kiradech Aphibarnrat	64	−8
T1	(South Africa) Christiaan Bezuidenhout	64	−8
3	(Australia) Adam Scott	65	−7
T4	(England) Laurie Canter	67	−5
T4	(Japan) Masahiro Kawamura	67	−5
T4	(England) Justin Rose	67	−5
T7	(Spain) Miguel Ángel Jiménez	68	−4
T7	(Italy) Francesco Laporta	68	−4
T7	(Spain) Pablo Larrazábal	68	−4
T7	(Netherlands) Joost Luiten	68	−4

=== Second round ===
Friday, 10 September 2021

Place	Player	Score	To par
1	(Thailand) Kiradech Aphibarnrat	64-68=132	−12
T2	(England) Laurie Canter	67-66=133	−11
T2	(Italy) Francesco Laporta	68-65=133	−11
4	(Australia) Adam Scott	65-69=134	−10
T5	(Wales) Jamie Donaldson	69-66=135	−9
T5	(United States) Billy Horschel	70-65=135	−9
T5	(England) Justin Rose	67-68=135	−9
T8	(England) Marcus Armitage	70-66=136	−8
T8	(South Africa) Christiaan Bezuidenhout	64-72=136	−8
T8	(Japan) Masahiro Kawamura	67-69=136	−8
T8	(Republic of Ireland) Shane Lowry	70-66=136	−8
T8	(Belgium) Thomas Pieters	70-66=136	−8
T8	(Paraguay) Fabrizio Zanotti	70-66=136	−8

=== Third round ===
Saturday, 11 September 2021

Place	Player	Score	To par
1	(Italy) Francesco Laporta	68-65-69=202	−14
2	(England) Laurie Canter	67-66-70=203	−13
T3	(South Africa) Christiaan Bezuidenhout	64-72-68=204	−12
T3	(Wales) Jamie Donaldson	69-66-69=204	−12
T3	(United States) Billy Horschel	70-65-69=204	−12
T3	(Australia) Adam Scott	65-69-70=204	−12
T7	(United States) Sean Crocker	71-68-66=205	−11
T7	(Republic of Ireland) Shane Lowry	70-66-69=205	−11
T7	(Austria) Bernd Wiesberger	71-67-67=205	−11
T10	(Thailand) Kiradech Aphibarnrat	64-68-74=206	−10
T10	(Denmark) Nicolai Højgaard	70-67-69=206	−10
T10	(Sweden) Joakim Lagergren	70-70-66=206	−10
T10	(South Africa) Justin Walters	70-70-66=206	−10

=== Final round ===
Sunday, 12 September 2021

Place	Player	Score	To par	Prize money (€)
1	(United States) Billy Horschel	70-65-69-65=269	−19	1,125,952
T2	(Thailand) Kiradech Aphibarnrat	64-68-74-64=270	−18	492,899
T2	(England) Laurie Canter	67-66-70-67=270	−18	492,899
T2	(Wales) Jamie Donaldson	69-66-69-66=270	−18	492,899
5	(South Africa) Christiaan Bezuidenhout	64-72-68-67=271	−17	281,587
T6	(England) Andrew Johnston	70-69-68-65=272	−16	199,533
T6	(Italy) Francesco Laporta	68-65-69-70=272	−16	199,533
T6	(England) Justin Rose	67-68-72-65=272	−16	199,533
T9	(United States) Sean Crocker	71-68-66-68=273	−15	135,125
T9	(Belgium) Thomas Pieters	70-66-71-66=273	−15	135,125
T9	(India) Shubhankar Sharma	70-69-68-66=273	−15	135,125
