= Billy Horschel =

American professional golfer (born 1986)

Personal information
- Full name: William John Horschel
- Nicknames: Baton Boy, Town Crier
- Nationality: United States
- Born: December 7, 1986 (age 39) Grant, Florida, U.S.
- Height: 6 ft 0 in (1.83 m)
- Weight: 175 lb (79 kg; 12.5 st)
- Spouse: Brittany Nelson (m. 2010)
- Children: 3

Career
- Sport: Golf
- College: Florida
- Turned professional: 2009
- Current tours: PGA Tour; European Tour
- Former tour: eGolf Professional Tour
- Professional wins: 11
- Highest ranking: 11 (June 5, 2022) (as of October 25, 2026)

Number of wins by tour
- PGA Tour: 8
- European Tour: 3
- Other: 1

Best results in major championships
- Masters Tournament: T17: 2016
- PGA Championship: T8: 2024
- U.S. Open: T4: 2013
- The Open Championship: T2: 2024

Achievements and awards
- PGA Tour FedEx Cup winner: 2014

William John Horschel (born December 7, 1986) is an American professional golfer who currently plays on the PGA Tour.

== Early years and amateur career ==
Horschel was born and raised in Grant, Florida. He attended Bayside High School in neighboring Palm Bay.

Horschel accepted an athletic scholarship to attend the University of Florida, where he played for coach Buddy Alexander's Florida Gators men's golf team in National Collegiate Athletic Association (NCAA) competition from 2005 to 2009. He was a four-time All-American, including three first-team honors, and the Southeastern Conference (SEC) player of the year in 2007 and 2009. He was a 2008 PING southeast all-region selection. He graduated from the University of Florida with a bachelor's degree in sport management in 2009. He represented the United States at the Palmer Cup on two occasions in 2007 and 2008 gaining 4.5 points. He posted a 3–1 record for the victorious 2007 Walker Cup team.

Horschel won the individual medalist honors at the 2006 U.S. Amateur, shooting a two-day score of 138 (60-78, −5) at Hazeltine National Golf Club in Chaska, Minnesota. His opening round of 60 was an 18–hole tournament and USGA record. He failed to make it past the third round of match play. He also played in the 2006 U.S. Open, but he missed the cut.

== Professional career ==
Horschel turned professional in 2009. In December 2009, he gained a 2010 PGA Tour card through qualifying school. A wrist injury limited Horschel to four PGA Tour events that year, and he did not make the cut in any of them.

In December 2010, he regained his Tour card through qualifying school to back up his medical extension should he fail to earn enough to secure his Tour Card. In February 2011, he made the cut at the Mayakoba Golf Classic, his first in eleven PGA Tour starts, finishing T13. Horschel finished the season 140th on the money list, granting him conditional status for 2012.

Horschel finished third at the 2012 True South Classic, but only finished 147th on the 2012 money list. Horschel's best finish on the Web.com Tour is a 4th at the 2012 Stadion Classic at UGA.

After his third successful attempt in four trips to Q School, he earned his PGA Tour Card for 2013. He began his season making the cut in every tournament he entered. He had three consecutive top-10 finishes before his breakthrough win at the 2013 Zurich Classic of New Orleans in his 61st PGA Tour start. Horschel made six consecutive birdies in the fourth round and won by one stroke over D. A. Points. The win moved Horschel to third in the FedEx Cup standings, third on the PGA Tour money list, and 49th in the Official World Golf Ranking. It earned him entry to the 2013 PGA Championship, the 2013 WGC-Bridgestone Invitational, The Players Championship, and the 2014 Masters Tournament. His world ranking also earned him entry into the U.S. Open. By the end of April 2013, Horschel led the PGA Tour in consecutive cuts made with twenty-three, dating from the FedEx St. Jude Classic in June 2012. That streak ended when he missed the cut at The Players Championship, the tournament he played in after his win.

In the 2013 U.S. Open, Horschel held the joint lead with Phil Mickelson, at the halfway stage of the tournament. Playing in his first major as a professional, he was one of only two players under par after the second round, hitting all 18 of Merion's greens in regulation. He shot rounds of 72–74 over the weekend to finish at five-over-par for the tournament and four strokes behind eventual winner Justin Rose. Horschel finished T4 in his first major as a professional and moved up to 34th in the world rankings and 4th in the FedEx Cup standings.

Horschel earned his second win at the 2014 BMW Championship and moved to 23rd in the world rankings. The next week, he won The Tour Championship at East Lake Golf Club and with it the FedEx Cup. The win also moved Horschel to 14th in the OWGR. Two days after winning the Tour Championship and FedEx Cup, Horschel became a father for the first time.

In May 2017, Horschel won the AT&T Byron Nelson in a playoff over Jason Day.

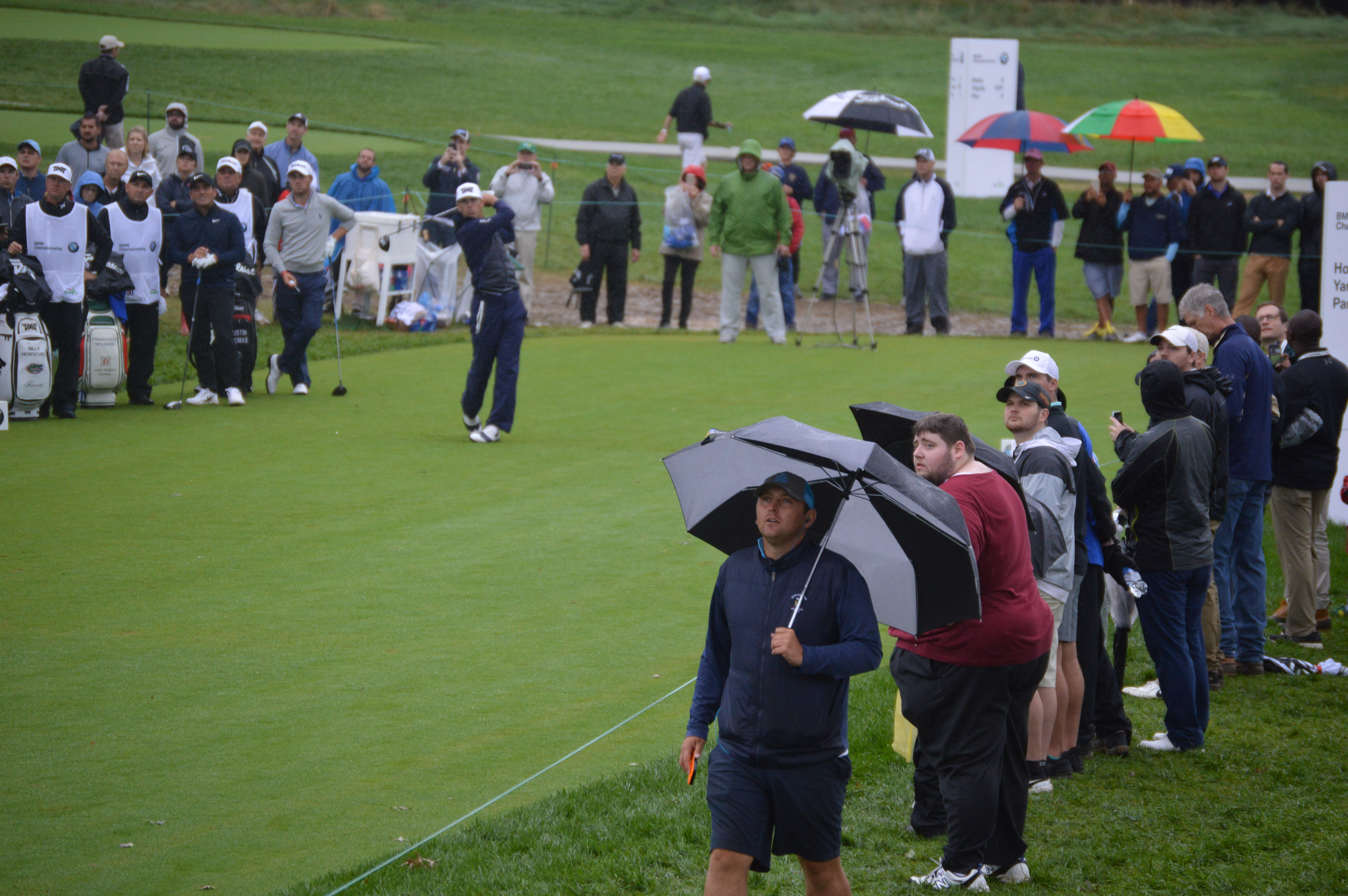
Horschel's tee shot at the 2018 BMW Championship.

In April 2018, Horschel won the Zurich Classic of New Orleans with partner Scott Piercy.

In March 2021, Horschel won the WGC-Dell Technologies Match Play defeating Scottie Scheffler 2 & 1 in the final. This was his first World Golf Championship victory. In September later that year, he won the BMW PGA Championship by shooting a final-round 65. It was his second European Tour victory.

In June 2022, Horschel won Memorial Tournament at Muirfield Village in Dublin, Ohio, his seventh PGA Tour title. In September 2022, Horschel was selected for the U.S. team in the 2022 Presidents Cup; he won one and lost two of the three matches he played.

In April 2024, he came from behind to win the Corales Puntacana Championship. In September 2024, Horschel became the first American golfer to win the BMW PGA Championship twice when he made an eagle putt to beat Rory McIlroy in a playoff.

== Personal life ==
Horschel met Brittany Nelson when both were golfers at the University of Florida. They were married in 2010 and have three children. Horschel is also a supporter of West Ham United F.C.

== Professional wins (11) ==
=== PGA Tour wins (8) ===
Legend
World Golf Championships (1)
FedEx Cup playoff events (2)
Other PGA Tour (5)

No.	Date	Tournament	Winning score	To par	Margin of victory	Runner(s)-up
1	Apr 28, 2013	Zurich Classic of New Orleans	67-71-66-64=268	−20	1 stroke	(United States) D. A. Points
2	Sep 7, 2014	BMW Championship	68-66-63-69=266	−14	2 strokes	(United States) Bubba Watson
3	Sep 14, 2014	Tour Championship	66-66-69-68=269	−11	3 strokes	(United States) Jim Furyk, (Northern Ireland) Rory McIlroy
4	May 21, 2017	AT&T Byron Nelson	68-65-66-69=268	−12	Playoff	(Australia) Jason Day
5	Apr 29, 2018	Zurich Classic of New Orleans (2) (with (United States) Scott Piercy)	65-73-61-67=266	−22	1 stroke	(United States) Jason Dufner and (United States) Pat Perez
6	Mar 28, 2021	WGC-Dell Technologies Match Play	2 and 1			(United States) Scottie Scheffler
7	Jun 5, 2022	Memorial Tournament	70-68-65-72=275	−13	4 strokes	(United States) Aaron Wise
8	Apr 21, 2024	Corales Puntacana Championship	67-69-66-63=265	−23	2 strokes	(United States) Wesley Bryan

PGA Tour playoff record (1–1)

No.	Year	Tournament	Opponent(s)	Result
1	2016	RSM Classic	(United States) Blayne Barber, (Canada) Mackenzie Hughes, (Sweden) Henrik Norlander, (Colombia) Camilo Villegas	Hughes won with par on third extra hole Horschel eliminated by par on first hole
2	2017	AT&T Byron Nelson	(Australia) Jason Day	Won with par on first extra hole

=== European Tour wins (3) ===
Legend
World Golf Championships (1)
Flagship events (1)
Rolex Series (2) (Note: The 2021 BMW PGA Championship was also a Rolex Series tournament.)
Other European Tour (0)

No.	Date	Tournament	Winning score	To par	Margin of victory	Runner(s)-up
1	Mar 28, 2021	WGC-Dell Technologies Match Play	2 and 1			(United States) Scottie Scheffler
2	Sep 12, 2021	BMW PGA Championship	70-65-69-65=269	−19	1 stroke	(Thailand) Kiradech Aphibarnrat, (England) Laurie Canter, (Wales) Jamie Donaldson
3	Sep 22, 2024	BMW PGA Championship (2)	67-69-65-67=268	−20	Playoff	(South Africa) Thriston Lawrence, (Northern Ireland) Rory McIlroy

European Tour playoff record (1–0)

No.	Year	Tournament	Opponents	Result
1	2024	BMW PGA Championship	(South Africa) Thriston Lawrence, (Northern Ireland) Rory McIlroy	Won with eagle on second extra hole Lawrence eliminated by birdie on first hole

=== eGolf Professional Tour wins (1) ===
No.	Date	Tournament	Winning score	To par	Margin of victory	Runner-up
1	Aug 8, 2009	Columbia Championship	68-65-66-69=267	−17	3 strokes	(United States) Dane Burkhart

== Results in major championships ==
Results not in chronological order in 2020.

Tournament	2006	2007	2008	2009
Masters Tournament				
U.S. Open	CUT			
The Open Championship				
PGA Championship				

Tournament	2010	2011	2012	2013	2014	2015	2016	2017	2018
Masters Tournament					T37	CUT	T17		CUT
U.S. Open				T4	T23	T25	T32	CUT	
The Open Championship				CUT	CUT	T30	CUT	CUT	
PGA Championship				CUT	T58	T25	T79	T48	T35

Tournament	2019	2020	2021	2022	2023	2024	2025	2026
Masters Tournament	T56	T38	T50	43	52		CUT	
PGA Championship	T23	T43	T23	68	CUT	T8		CUT
U.S. Open	T32	T38	CUT	CUT	T43	T41		CUT
The Open Championship	CUT	NT	T53	T21	CUT	T2		CUT

Top 10
Did not play

CUT = missed the half-way cut
"T" indicates a tie for a place
NT = no tournament due to COVID-19 pandemic

=== Summary ===
Tournament	Wins	2nd	3rd	Top-5	Top-10	Top-25	Events	Cuts made
Masters Tournament	0	0	0	0	0	1	10	7
PGA Championship	0	0	0	0	1	4	13	10
U.S. Open	0	0	0	1	1	3	13	8
The Open Championship	0	1	0	1	1	2	11	4
Totals	0	1	0	2	3	10	47	29

- Most consecutive cuts made – 5 (twice)
- Longest streak of top-10s – 1 (three times)

== Results in The Players Championship ==
Tournament	2013	2014	2015	2016	2017	2018	2019
The Players Championship	CUT	T26	T13	T28	CUT	T37	T26

Tournament	2020	2021	2022	2023	2024	2025
The Players Championship	C	T58	WD	CUT	CUT	T42

CUT = missed the halfway cut
"T" indicates a tie for a place
WD = withdrew
C = Canceled after the first round due to the COVID-19 pandemic

== World Golf Championships ==
=== Wins (1) ===
Year	Championship	54 holes	Winning score	Margin	Runner-up
2021	WGC-Dell Technologies Match Play	n/a	2 and 1		(United States) Scottie Scheffler

=== Results timeline ===
Results not in chronological order before 2015.

Tournament	2013	2014	2015	2016	2017	2018	2019	2020	2021	2022	2023
Championship		T50	T46	41			T45	T9	T2		
Match Play		R32	T17	T38			T24	NT^{1}	1	R16	R16
Invitational	T44		T33		T74		T9	T25	T17		
Champions	T35	T73				T11	T24	NT^{1}	NT^{1}	NT^{1}	

^{1}Canceled due to COVID-19 pandemic

Win
Top 10
Did not play

QF, R16, R32, R64 = Round in which player lost in match play
NT = No tournament
"T" = Tied
Note that the Championship and Invitational were discontinued from 2022. The Champions was discontinued from 2023.

== U.S. national team appearances ==
Amateur

- Palmer Cup: 2007 (winners), 2008
- Walker Cup: 2007 (winners)
- Eisenhower Trophy: 2008

Professional

- Wendy's 3-Tour Challenge (representing PGA Tour): 2013
- Presidents Cup: 2022 (winners)

== See also ==
- 2009 PGA Tour Qualifying School graduates
- 2010 PGA Tour Qualifying School graduates
- 2012 PGA Tour Qualifying School graduates
- List of Florida Gators men's golfers on the PGA Tour
- List of University of Florida alumni
