= Joachim Hansen =

Joachim Hansen may refer to:

- Joachim Hansen (actor) (1930–2007), German actor
- Joachim Hansen (fighter), Norwegian mixed martial artist
- Joachim B. Hansen (born 1990), Danish golfer
