= Canary Islands Championship =

2021 golf tournament in Tenerife, Spain

Coordinates: 28.114°N 16.748°W

Tournament information
- Location: Tenerife, Spain
- Established: 2021
- Course: Golf Costa Adeje
- Par: 71
- Length: 6,857 yards (6,270 m)
- Tour: European Tour
- Format: Stroke play
- Prize fund: €1,500,000
- Month played: May
- Final year: 2021

Tournament record score
- Aggregate: 257 Garrick Higgo (2021)
- To par: −27 as above

Final champion
- (South Africa) Garrick Higgo

Location map
- Location in the Canary Islands Location in Tenerife

The Canary Islands Championship was a professional golf tournament that was held 6–9 May 2021 at Golf Costa Adeje in Tenerife, Spain.

The tournament was intended to be a one-off event and was played the week after the Tenerife Open, creating a three-week swing of events in the Canary Islands.

Garrick Higgo won the event for his second win in the Canary Islands in the space of three weeks.

== Winners ==
Year	Winner	Score	To par	Margin of victory	Runner-up
2021	(South Africa) Garrick Higgo	257	−27	6 strokes	(Australia) Maverick Antcliff
