= Guido Migliozzi =

Italian professional golfer

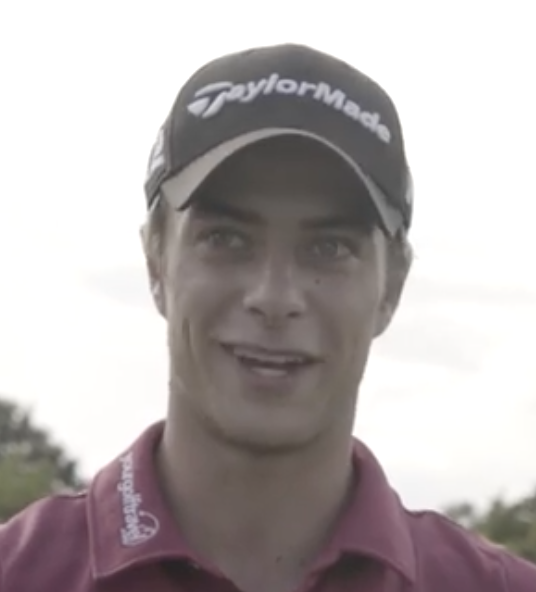
- Migliozzi at the 2017 Open Abruzzo

Personal information
- Nationality: Italy
- Born: 25 January 1997 (age 29) Vicenza, Italy
- Height: 1.80 m (5 ft 11 in)

Career
- Sport: Golf
- Turned professional: 2016
- Current tour: European Tour
- Former tours: Challenge Tour; Alps Tour
- Professional wins: 7
- Highest ranking: 65 (3 October 2021) (as of 25 October 2026)

Number of wins by tour
- European Tour: 4
- Other: 3

Best results in major championships
- Masters Tournament: CUT: 2022
- PGA Championship: DNP
- U.S. Open: T4: 2021
- The Open Championship: T31: 2024

Guido Migliozzi (born 25 January 1997) is an Italian professional golfer. He has four wins on the European Tour. He also competed at the 2020 Summer Olympics.

== Professional career ==
Migliozzi turned professional in 2016. In 2017 and 2018 he played mostly on the Challenge Tour and the Alps Tour. He had little success on the Challenge Tour but won three times on the Alps Tour, once in 2017 and twice in 2018, as well as losing the 2018 Alps de Las Castillas in a three-man playoff.

In November 2018, he finished tied for 13th place in the European Tour Q-School to earn a place on the 2019 European Tour. In March 2019 he won the Magical Kenya Open, his first win on the European Tour and in June 2019 he won the Belgian Knockout, beating Darius van Driel in the final, a result that lifted him into the top-100 of the world rankings.

In March 2021, Migliozzi was a joint runner-up in the Commercial Bank Qatar Masters, one stroke behind Antoine Rozner who won the tournament with a 60-foot putt at the final green. In May, he lost in a playoff at the Betfred British Masters. He was defeated by Richard Bland at the first extra hole. Two weeks later, he finished second at the Made in HimmerLand, five strokes behind Bernd Wiesberger, after a final round 63 in which he birdied four of the last five holes.

Qualifying for his first major championship, the 2021 U.S. Open, he finished tied for 4th, thus earning him exemptions for the 2022 tournament as well as the 2022 Masters Tournament.

In September 2022, Migliozzi won the Cazoo Open de France. He shot a final-round 62 to win by one shot over Rasmus Højgaard, after making a birdie on the final hole at Le Golf National. It was the first birdie of the day on the hole; ranked as the most difficult hole on the European Tour season.

== Amateur wins ==
- 2011 Italian Boys Under 14 Championship
- 2012 Italian Under 16 Championship, Italian U18 Stroke Play, Italian U16 International Championship
- 2013 Italian U18 (Trofeo Silvio Marazza), Campionato Nazionale Cadetti Trofeo Giovanni Alberto Agnelli, Duke of York Young Champions Trophy
- 2014 European Nations Cup Individual, Internationaux de France U18 - Trophee Carlhian, Italian Amateur Match Play - Giuseppe Silva Trophy
- 2016 Portuguese International Amateur

== Professional wins (7) ==
=== European Tour wins (4) ===
No.	Date	Tournament	Winning score	Margin of victory	Runner(s)-up
1	17 Mar 2019	Magical Kenya Open	−16 (67-68-64-69=268)	1 stroke	(Spain) Adri Arnaus, (South Africa) Louis de Jager, (South Africa) Justin Harding
2	2 Jun 2019	Belgian Knockout	−3	4 strokes	(Netherlands) Darius van Driel
3	25 Sep 2022	Cazoo Open de France	−16 (69-71-66-62=268)	1 stroke	(Denmark) Rasmus Højgaard
4	23 Jun 2024	KLM Open	−11 (68-69-66-70=273)	Playoff	(England) Joe Dean, (Sweden) Marcus Kinhult

European Tour playoff record (1–1)

No.	Year	Tournament	Opponent(s)	Result
1	2021	Betfred British Masters	(England) Richard Bland	Lost to par on first extra hole
2	2024	KLM Open	(England) Joe Dean, (Sweden) Marcus Kinhult	Won with birdie on second extra hole

=== Alps Tour wins (3) ===
No.	Date	Tournament	Winning score	Margin of victory	Runners-up
1	24 Sep 2017	Open Abruzzo	−14 (66-68-68-68=270)	Playoff	(France) Alexandre Daydou, (France) Julien Forêt
2	29 Jun 2018	Memorial Giorgio Bordoni	−14 (62-67-67=196)	1 stroke	(England) Tom Shadbolt, (England) James Sharp
3	22 Sep 2018	Open Abruzzo (2)	−18 (67-63-65=195)	1 stroke	(France) Paul Elissalde, (France) Julien Forêt

== Results in major championships ==
Tournament	2021	2022	2023	2024	2025
Masters Tournament		CUT			
PGA Championship					
U.S. Open	T4	T14			CUT
The Open Championship	CUT	CUT	T64	T31	CUT

Top 10
Did not play

CUT = missed the half-way cut
"T" = tied

== Team appearances ==
Amateur

- European Boys' Team Championship (representing Italy): 2012, 2013, 2014, 2015
- Eisenhower Trophy (representing Italy): 2014, 2016
- Jacques Léglise Trophy (representing the Continent of Europe): 2015 (tied)
- St Andrews Trophy (representing the Continent of Europe): 2016 (tied)
- European Amateur Team Championship (representing Italy): 2016

Professional

- European Championships (representing Italy): 2018
- Hero Cup (representing Continental Europe): 2023 (winners)

== See also ==
- 2018 European Tour Qualifying School graduates
