= Maximilian Kieffer =

German professional golfer

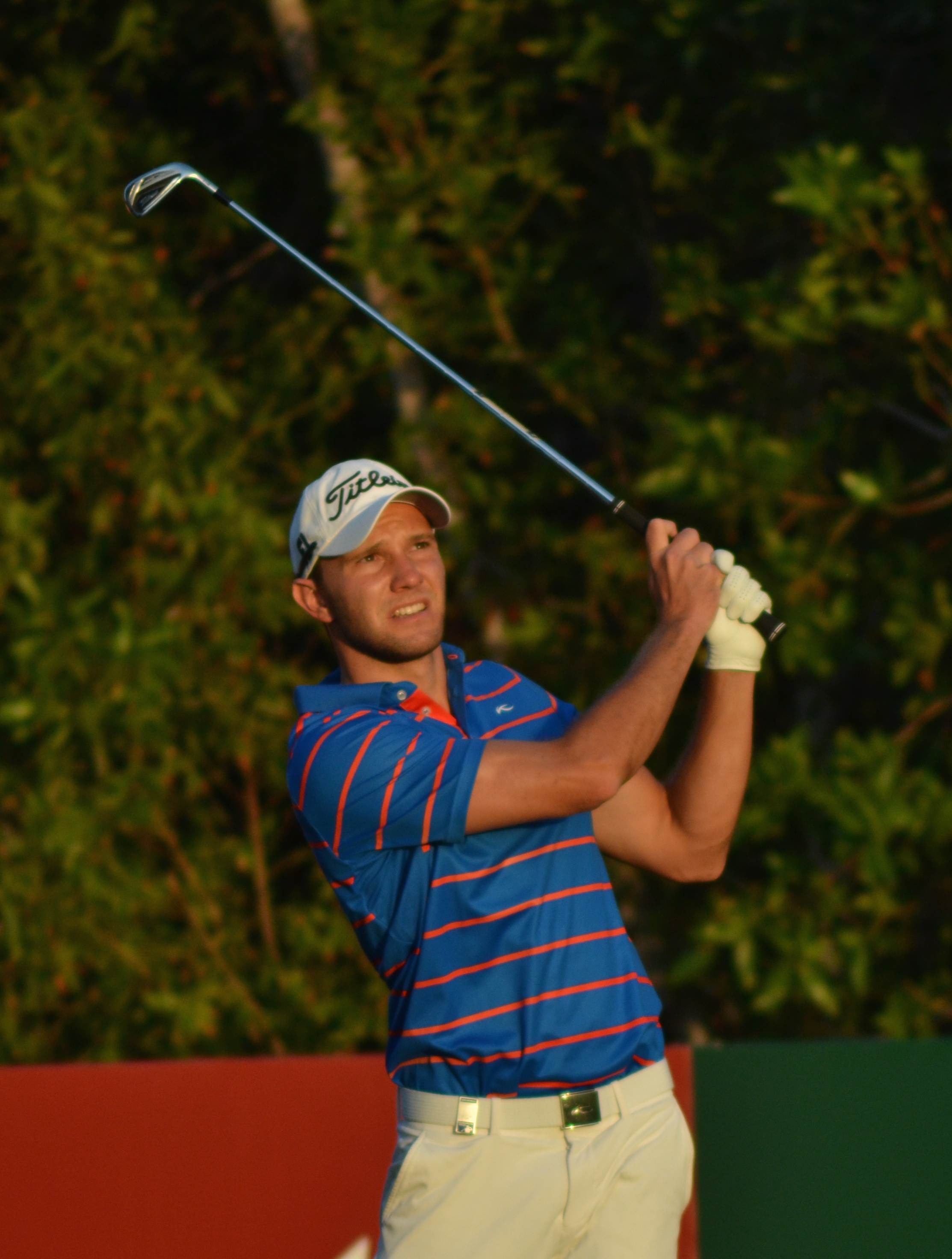

Personal information
- Nationality: Germany
- Born: 25 June 1990 (age 36) Bergisch Gladbach, West Germany
- Height: 5 ft 11 in (1.80 m)
- Weight: 74 kg (163 lb; 11.7 st)

Career
- Sport: Golf
- College: University of Florida
- Turned professional: 2010
- Current tour: European Tour
- Former tour: Challenge Tour
- Professional wins: 2

Number of wins by tour
- European Tour: 1
- Challenge Tour: 1

Best results in major championships
- Masters Tournament: DNP
- PGA Championship: DNP
- U.S. Open: CUT: 2014, 2016
- The Open Championship: DNP

Maximilian Kieffer (born 25 June 1990) is a German professional golfer who plays on the European Tour.

== Career ==
Kieffer was born in Bergisch Gladbach. He played most of his golf at Hubbelrath Golf Club in Düsseldorf, the same club as Martin Kaymer. He represented the German National team from 2005-2010 and represented Europe in the Junior Ryder Cup in 2006. He played college golf briefly in the United States at the University of Florida. He turned professional in 2010.

Kieffer joined the Challenge Tour in 2011 and won his first tournament in 2012 at the Gujarat Kensville Challenge in India.

In April 2013, Kieffer lost in a sudden-death playoff at the Open de España. In the joint longest playoff in European Tour history, Kieffer was beaten by a Raphaël Jacquelin birdie on the ninth playoff hole.

In May 2015, during the third round of the Dubai Duty Free Irish Open, Kieffer broke the Royal County Down course record set in 1939 by shooting 6-under-par 65.

In April 2021, Kieffer lost in a sudden-death playoff again at the Austrian Golf Open. He was defeated by John Catlin on the fifth extra hole when he hit three balls into the water. The following week, Kieffer carded a final-round 62 to finish runner-up again at the Gran Canaria Lopesan Open.

In August 2022, Kieffer claimed his first European Tour victory at the D+D Real Czech Masters. He won by one shot ahead of Gavin Green.

== Professional wins (2) ==
=== European Tour wins (1) ===
No.	Date	Tournament	Winning score	Margin of victory	Runner-up
1	21 Aug 2022	D+D Real Czech Masters	−16 (68-66-66=200) (Note: Shortened to 54 holes due to weather.)	1 stroke	(Malaysia) Gavin Green

European Tour playoff record (0–2)

No.	Year	Tournament	Opponent(s)	Result
1	2013	Open de España	(Chile) Felipe Aguilar, (France) Raphaël Jacquelin	Jacquelin won with birdie on ninth extra hole Aguilar eliminated by birdie on third hole
2	2021	Austrian Golf Open	(United States) John Catlin	Lost to bogey on fifth extra hole

=== Challenge Tour wins (1) ===
No.	Date	Tournament	Winning score	Margin of victory	Runner-up
1	29 Jan 2012	Gujarat Kensville Challenge^{1}	−7 (70-71-70-70=281)	Playoff	(India) Rahil Gangjee

^{1}Co-sanctioned by the Professional Golf Tour of India

Challenge Tour playoff record (1–1)

No.	Year	Tournament	Opponent	Result
1	2011	Allianz Challenge de France	(Germany) Nicolas Meitinger	Lost to birdie on second extra hole
2	2012	Gujarat Kensville Challenge	(India) Rahil Gangjee	Won with par on first extra hole

== Results in major championships ==
Tournament	2014	2015	2016
U.S. Open	CUT		CUT

Did not play

CUT = missed the halfway cut
Note: Kieffer only played in the U.S. Open.

== Team appearances ==
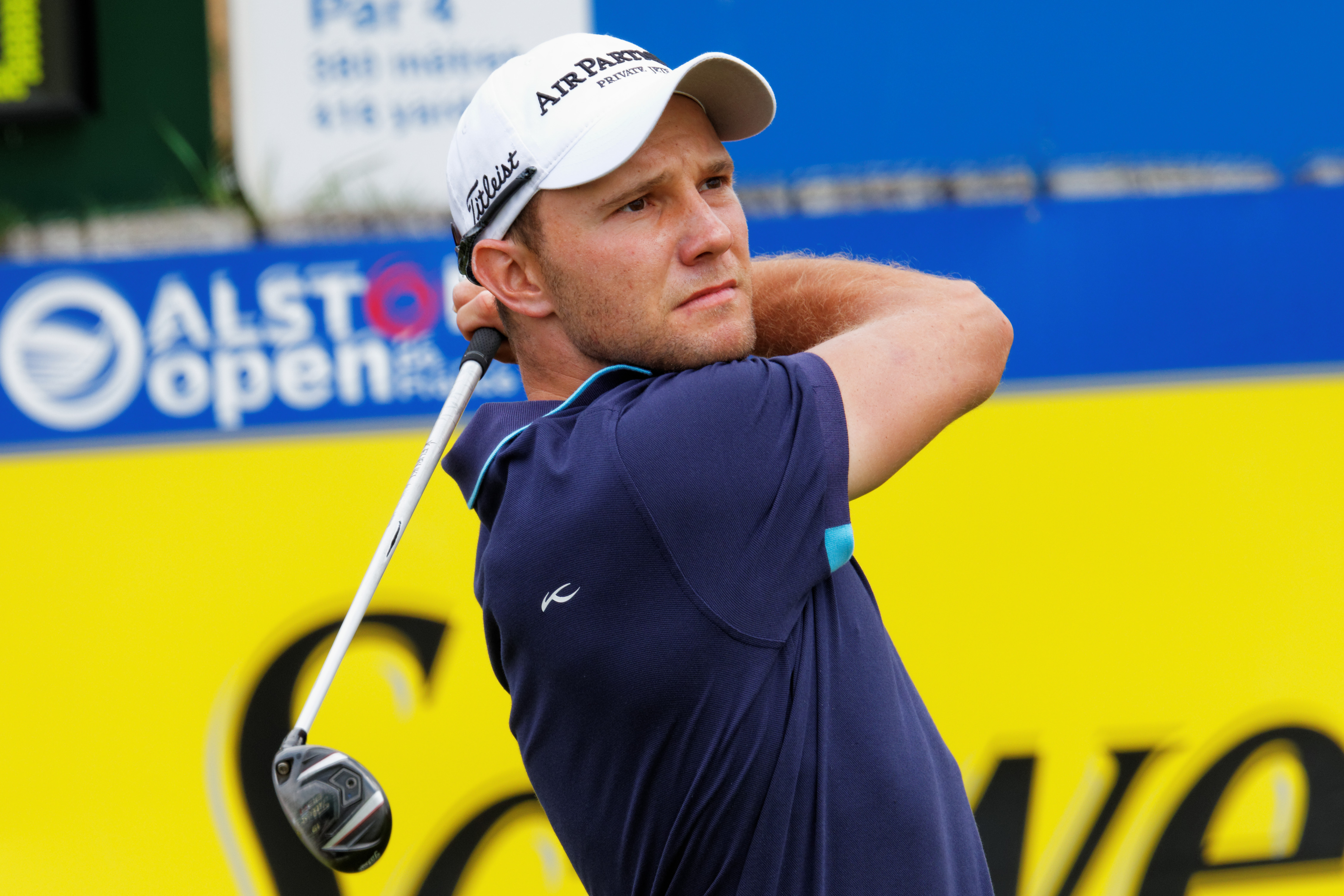
Open de France 2015

Amateur

- Junior Ryder Cup (representing Europe): 2006 (tie, Cup retained)
- European Boys' Team Championship (representing Germany): 2007, 2008
- Jacques Léglise Trophy (representing the Continent of Europe): 2007, 2008
- European Amateur Team Championship (representing Germany): 2008, 2009, 2010
- Eisenhower Trophy (representing Germany): 2010
- St Andrews Trophy (representing the Continent of Europe): 2010 (winners)

Professional

- World Cup (representing Germany): 2013, 2018

== See also ==
- 2012 Challenge Tour graduates
