= 2021 European Tour =

Golf tour season

2021 European Tour season
- Duration: 21 January 2021 – 21 November 2021
- Number of official events: 40 (Note: A further seven tournaments were scheduled but were either cancelled, postponed or otherwise removed from the schedule.)
- Most wins: (United States) Collin Morikawa (3)
- Race to Dubai: (United States) Collin Morikawa
- Player of the Year: (Spain) Jon Rahm
- Sir Henry Cotton Rookie of the Year: (Germany) Matti Schmid

The 2021 European Tour was the 50th season of the European Tour, the main professional golf tour in Europe since its inaugural season in 1972.

== Changes for 2021 ==
Following a heavily disrupted 2020 season due to the COVID-19 pandemic, there was a new look to the calendar announced in December 2020, with tournaments being scheduled in groups based on location. The Rolex Series was also reduced to just four tournaments - the Abu Dhabi HSBC Championship, the Abrdn Scottish Open, the BMW PGA Championship and the season ending DP World Tour Championship, Dubai.

== Schedule ==
The following table lists official events during the 2021 season.

Date	Tournament	Host country	Purse	R2D points	Winner (Note: The number in brackets after each winner's name is the number of European Tour events they had won up to and including that tournament. This information is only shown for European Tour members.)	OWGR points	Other tours (Note: AFR − Sunshine Tour; ASA − Asian Tour; LET − Ladies European Tour.)	Notes
24 Jan	Abu Dhabi HSBC Championship	UAE	US$8,000,000	8,000	(England) Tyrrell Hatton (6)	48		Rolex Series
31 Jan	Omega Dubai Desert Classic	UAE	US$3,250,000	4,250	(England) Paul Casey (15)	48		
7 Feb	Saudi International	Saudi Arabia	US$3,500,000	4,250	(United States) Dustin Johnson (n/a)	54		
28 Feb	WGC-Workday Championship	United States (Note: Moved from Mexico due to the COVID-19 pandemic.)	US$10,500,000	8,000	(United States) Collin Morikawa (2)	74		World Golf Championship
~~7 Mar~~	Oman Open	Oman	–	–	Postponed	–		
14 Mar	Commercial Bank Qatar Masters	Qatar	US$1,500,000	2,000	(France) Antoine Rozner (2)	24		
21 Mar	Magical Kenya Open	Kenya	€1,000,000	2,000	(South Africa) Justin Harding (2)	24		
26 Mar	Kenya Savannah Classic	Kenya	€1,000,000	2,000	(South Africa) Daniel van Tonder (1)	24		New tournament
28 Mar	WGC-Dell Technologies Match Play	United States	US$10,500,000	8,000	(United States) Billy Horschel (1)	76		World Golf Championship
11 Apr	Masters Tournament	United States	US$11,500,000	10,000	(Japan) Hideki Matsuyama (n/a)	100		Major championship
18 Apr (Note: Added to the schedule following the postponement of the Portugal Masters.)	Austrian Golf Open	Austria	€1,000,000	2,000	(United States) John Catlin (3)	24		
25 Apr	Gran Canaria Lopesan Open	Spain	€1,500,000	2,750	(South Africa) Garrick Higgo (2)	24		New tournament
2 May (Note: Rescheduled following the postponement of the Portugal Masters.); ~~18 Apr~~	Tenerife Open	Spain	€1,500,000	2,750	(South Africa) Dean Burmester (2)	24		
~~9 May~~	Open de France	France	–	–	Cancelled	–		
9 May (Note: Added to the schedule following the cancellation of the Open de France.)	Canary Islands Championship	Spain	€1,500,000	2,750	(South Africa) Garrick Higgo (3)	24		New tournament
15 May	Betfred British Masters	England	£1,850,000	3,500	(England) Richard Bland (1)	24		
23 May	PGA Championship	United States	US$12,000,000	10,000	(United States) Phil Mickelson (n/a)	100		Major championship
30 May	Made in HimmerLand	Denmark	€1,500,000	2,750	(Austria) Bernd Wiesberger (8)	24		
7 Jun	Porsche European Open	Germany	€1,200,000	2,000	(England) Marcus Armitage (1)	24		
13 Jun	Scandinavian Mixed	Sweden	€1,000,000	2,000	(Northern Ireland) Jonathan Caldwell (1)	24	LET	Mixed event (Note: Field of 78 men and 78 women playing from different sets of tees. Tour ranking and world ranking points based on finish among men's field only.)
20 Jun	U.S. Open	United States	US$12,500,000	10,000	(Spain) Jon Rahm (7)	100		Major championship
27 Jun	BMW International Open	Germany	€1,500,000	2,750	(Norway) Viktor Hovland (1)	24		
4 Jul	Dubai Duty Free Irish Open	Ireland	€3,000,000	4,250	(Australia) Lucas Herbert (2)	28		
11 Jul	Abrdn Scottish Open	Scotland	US$8,000,000	8,000	(Australia) Min Woo Lee (2)	56		Rolex Series
18 Jul	The Open Championship	England	US$11,500,000	10,000	(United States) Collin Morikawa (3)	100		Major championship
25 Jul	Cazoo Open	Wales	€1,250,000	2,000	(Spain) Nacho Elvira (1)	24		
1 Aug	ISPS Handa World Invitational	Northern Ireland	US$1,500,000	2,000	(England) Daniel Gavins (1)	24		New to European Tour
8 Aug	Hero Open	Scotland	€1,250,000	2,000	(Scotland) Grant Forrest (1)	24		
8 Aug	WGC-FedEx St. Jude Invitational	United States	US$10,500,000	8,000	(Mexico) Abraham Ancer (1)	74		World Golf Championship
15 Aug	Cazoo Classic	England	€1,250,000	2,000	(Scotland) Calum Hill (1)	24		
22 Aug	D+D Real Czech Masters	Czech Republic	€1,000,000	2,000	(United States) Johannes Veerman (1)	24		
29 Aug	Omega European Masters	Switzerland	€2,000,000	2,750	(Denmark) Rasmus Højgaard (3)	24		
5 Sep	DS Automobiles Italian Open	Italy	€3,000,000	4,250	(Denmark) Nicolai Højgaard (1)	28		
12 Sep	BMW PGA Championship	England	US$8,000,000	8,000	(United States) Billy Horschel (2)	64		Flagship event (Note: Also a Rolex Series tournament.)
19 Sep	Dutch Open	Netherlands	€1,000,000	2,000	(Sweden) Kristoffer Broberg (2)	24		
3 Oct	Alfred Dunhill Links Championship	Scotland	US$5,000,000	5,500	(England) Danny Willett (8)	30		Pro-Am
10 Oct	Acciona Open de España	Spain	€1,500,000	2,750	(Spain) Rafa Cabrera-Bello (4)	24		
17 Oct	Estrella Damm N.A. Andalucía Masters	Spain	€3,000,000	4,250	(England) Matt Fitzpatrick (7)	30		
~~24 Oct~~	Trophée Hassan II	Morocco	–	–	Cancelled	–		
24 Oct (Note: Event added to the schedule in September in place of the Trophée Hassan II, which was cancelled earlier in the year.)	Mallorca Golf Open	Spain	€1,000,000	2,000	(Denmark) Jeff Winther (1)	24		New tournament
~~31 Oct~~	Hero Indian Open	India	–	–	Cancelled	–	ASA	
~~31 Oct~~	WGC-HSBC Champions	China	–	–	Cancelled	–		World Golf Championship
~~7 Nov~~	Volvo China Open	China	–	–	Removed (Note: Event proceeded as a sole-sanctioned China Tour event.)	–		
7 Nov (Note: Postponed from April to November due to the COVID-19 pandemic.); ~~2 May~~	Portugal Masters	Portugal	€1,500,000	2,750	(Belgium) Thomas Pieters (5)	24		
~~14 Nov~~	Nedbank Golf Challenge	South Africa	–	–	Cancelled	–	AFR	
14 Nov	Aviv Dubai Championship	UAE	US$1,500,000	2,000	(Denmark) Joachim B. Hansen (2)	24		
21 Nov	DP World Tour Championship, Dubai	UAE	US$9,000,000	12,000	(United States) Collin Morikawa (4)	46		Tour Championship

=== Unofficial events ===
The following events were sanctioned by the European Tour, but did not carry official money, nor were wins official.

Date	Tournament	Host country	Purse	Winner(s)	OWGR points	Notes
1 Aug	Olympic Games	Japan	n/a	(United States) Xander Schauffele	50	Limited-field event
26 Sep	Ryder Cup	United States	n/a	Team USA	n/a	Team event

== Location of tournaments ==
Location of tournaments in Europe.
Major championship
Flagship event
Rolex Series event
Regular event
Cancelled event

Location of tournaments outside Europe.
Major championship
World Golf Championships
Rolex Series event
Regular event
Unofficial event
Postponed or cancelled event, or no longer ET sanctioned

Fife, Scotland

Canary Islands

United Arab Emirates

== Race to Dubai ==
=== Points distribution ===
The distribution of Race to Dubai points for 2021 European Tour events were as follows:

Finishing position	Total pts	1st	2nd	3rd	4th	5th	6th	7th	8th	9th	10th	20th	30th	40th	50th	60th
Major championships	10,000	1,665	1,113	627	500	424	350	300	250	223	200	120	90	68	48	30
Rolex Series & WGCs	8,000	1,335	889	500	400	339	280	240	200	178	160	96	72	54	38	24
Regular tournament (Band 6) (Note: Tournaments with purses ranging from $5,000,000 to $5,499,999.)	5,500	915	612	345	275	234	192	165	138	123	110	66	50	37	28	17
Regular tournament (Band 4) (Note: Tournaments with purses ranging from $3,250,000 to $3,999,999.)	4,250	710	472	266	212	180	149	128	106	95	85	51	38	29	20	13
Regular tournament (Band 3) (Note: Tournaments with purses ranging from $2,500,000 to $3,249,999.)	3,500	585	389	218	175	148	123	105	88	78	70	42	32	24	17	11
Regular tournament (Band 2) (Note: Tournaments with purses ranging from $1,750,000 to $2,499,999.)	2,750	460	305	172	137	116	97	83	69	61	55	33	25	19	13	8
Regular tournament (Band 1) (Note: Tournaments with purses ranging from $1,000,000 to $1,749,999.)	2,000	335	222	125	100	84	70	60	50	44	40	24	18	14	10	6
DP World Tour Championship	12,000	2,000	1,335	752	600	509	420	359	300	267	240	144	108	82	58	36

=== Final standings ===
The Race to Dubai was based on tournament results during the season, calculated using a points-based system.

Pos.	Player	Majors				WGCs				Rolex Series				Top 10s in other ET events				Total pts	Tmts	Money (Note: In addition to tournament prize money, the top five point scorers received a share of a $1.25m bonus pool.)	
Pos.	Player	Mas	PGA	USO	Opn	WGC Wrk	WGC MP	WGC Inv	WGC Cha	Abu	Sco	BMW PGA	DPW TC	1	2	3	4	Total pts	Tmts	Reg. (€m)	Bon. ($k)
1	(United States) Morikawa	T18; 124	T8; 181	T4; 425	1st 1665	1st 1335	T56; 26	T26; 77	C A N C E L L E D	•	T71; 15	•	1st 2000					5,856	10	6.8	500
2	(United States) Horschel	T50; 47	T23; 102	CUT; 0	T53; 37	T2; 596	1st 1335	T17; 98	C A N C E L L E D	•	T54; 29	1st 1335	T32; 96					3,716	11	3.7	300
3	(Spain) Rahm	T5; 387	T8; 181	1st 1665	T3; 564	T32; 66	T5; 265	•	C A N C E L L E D	•	7th 240	•	•					3,403	9	3.6	~~200~~ (Note: By missing the DP World Tour Championship, Dubai, Rahm was not eligible for the bonus pool.)
4	(England) Fitzpatrick	T34; 77	T23; 102	T55; 37	T26; 93	T11; 138	T18; 90	T57; 26	C A N C E L L E D	CUT; 0	T2; 695	T20; 91	T2; 1044	1st 710				3,157	14	2.5	150
5	(England) Hatton	T18; 124	T38; 67	CUT; 0	CUT; 0	T22; 85	T56; 26	T17; 98	C A N C E L L E D	1st 1335	T18; 93	CUT; 0	T16; 156	T6; 119	T2; 479			2,628	14	2.1	100
6	(Australia) M. W. Lee	•	•	•	CUT; 0	T28; 73	•	62nd 22	C A N C E L L E D	CUT; 0	1st 1335	CUT; 0	T16; 156	T2; 369	T8; 59	T4; 79		2,343	21	1.8	
7	(England) Casey	T26; 92	T4; 394	T7; 221	T15; 138	•	T28; 64	T5; 286	C A N C E L L E D	•	•	•	T9; 218	1st 710	6th 70			2,272	11	1.8	
8	(Denmark) N. Højgaard	•	•	•	•	•	•	•	C A N C E L L E D	•	•	T20; 91	T4; 555	T7; 46	T4; 100	1st 710	T2; 205	1,954	22	1.2	
9	(Scotland) MacIntyre	T12; 152	T49; 45	T35; 74	T8; 214	T61; 22	T9; 138	T15; 115	C A N C E L L E D	T16; 98	T18; 93	CUT; 0	T4; 555	3rd 266	T8; 79			1,951	19	1.5	
10	(Mexico) Ancer	T26; 92	T8; 181	CUT; 0	T59; 28	T18; 98	T18; 90	1st 1335	C A N C E L L E D	•	•	•	T27; 112					1,950	10	2.1	

Win
Top 10
Made cut
Missed cut
• Did not play

== Awards ==
Award	Winner	Ref.
Player of the Year (Seve Ballesteros Award)	(Spain) Jon Rahm	
Sir Henry Cotton Rookie of the Year	(Germany) Matti Schmid	

== See also ==
- 2021 in golf
- 2021 Challenge Tour
- 2021 European Senior Tour
