= Dubai Championship =

Coordinates: 25.022°N 55.199°E

Aviv Dubai Championship
Tournament information
- Location: Dubai, United Arab Emirates
- Established: 2020
- Courses: Jumeirah Golf Estates (Fire Course)
- Par: 72
- Length: 7,480 yards (6,840 m)
- Tour: European Tour
- Format: Stroke play
- Prize fund: US$1,500,000
- Month played: November
- Final year: 2021

Tournament record score
- Aggregate: 263 Antoine Rozner (2020)
- To par: −25 as above

Final champion
- (Denmark) Joachim B. Hansen

Location map
- Location in the United Arab Emirates

The Aviv Dubai Championship was a professional golf tournament held on the Fire course at the Jumeirah Golf Estates, in Dubai, United Arab Emirates.

The tournament was slotted into the 2020 season as the penultimate event, with the season-ending DP World Tour Championship, Dubai following the week after on the Earth course at the same venue. It was originally intended to be a one-off event.

Antoine Rozner won the inaugural event with a 25-under-par 263 total. He shot a final round 64 to jump ahead of overnight leader Andy Sullivan; who shot a 61 in the first round.

The event returned in the 2021 season and was sponsored by Aviv Clinics. Again it was the penultimate event to the DP World Tour Championship, Dubai.

== Winners ==
Year	Winner	Score	To par	Margin of victory	Runners-up
Aviv Dubai Championship
2021	(Denmark) Joachim B. Hansen	265	−23	1 stroke	(Italy) Francesco Laporta (Austria) Bernd Wiesberger
Golf in Dubai Championship
2020	(France) Antoine Rozner	263	−25	2 strokes	(Italy) Francesco Laporta (France) Mike Lorenzo-Vera (England) Andy Sullivan (England) Matt Wallace
