= Richard Bland (golfer) =

English professional golfer (born 1973)

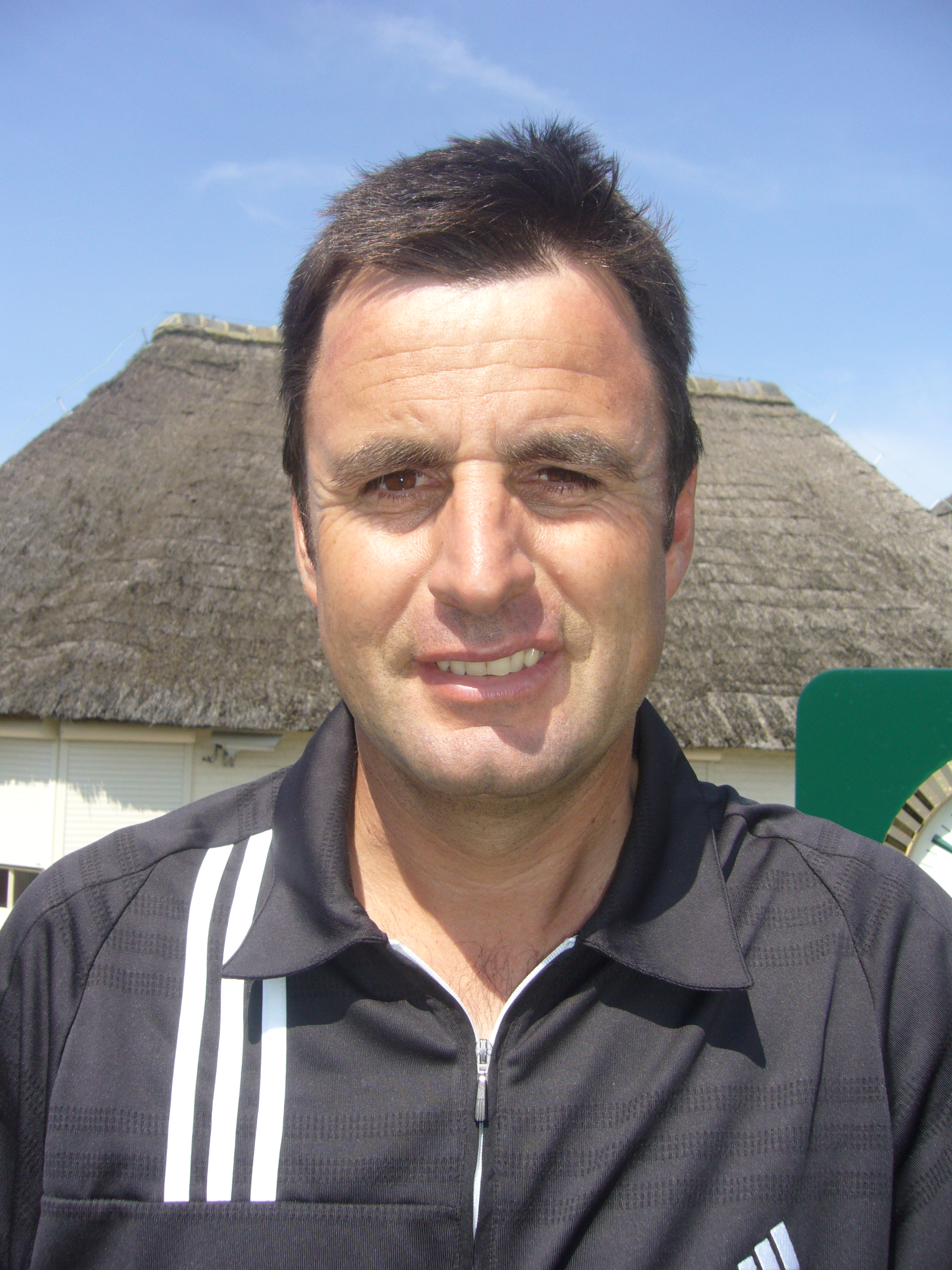

Personal information
- Nicknames: Blandy, Dickie B
- Nationality: England
- Born: 3 February 1973 (age 53) Burton upon Trent, Staffordshire, England
- Height: 6 ft 1 in (1.85 m)
- Spouse: Catrin Nystrom Bland (m. 2022)

Career
- Sport: Golf
- Turned professional: 1996
- Current tour: LIV Golf
- Former tours: European Tour; Challenge Tour
- Professional wins: 4
- Highest ranking: 48 (3 April 2022) (as of 25 October 2026)

Number of wins by tour
- European Tour: 1
- Challenge Tour: 1
- PGA Tour Champions: 2
- European Senior Tour: 2

Best results in major championships
- Masters Tournament: DNP
- PGA Championship: T37: 2025
- U.S. Open: T43: 2022
- The Open Championship: T22: 2017

Richard Bland (born 3 February 1973) is an English professional golfer who currently plays on the LIV Golf League. In 2021, he became the oldest first-time winner on the European Tour when he won the Betfred British Masters aged 48. He also won two senior major championships in 2024; the KitchenAid Senior PGA Championship and the U.S. Senior Open.

== Career ==
Bland was born in Burton upon Trent, Staffordshire, England. He turned professional in 1996 and reached the final stage of the European Tour's qualifying school in 1997 to gain his card on Europe's second tier Challenge Tour for 1998. In 2001 he won for the first time, at the season ending Challenge Tour Grand Final. The win elevated him in the rankings sufficiently to gain a place on the European Tour for 2002.

During his first season on the European Tour, Bland’s best tournament finish was a tie for 2nd place at the Murphy's Irish Open, losing in a playoff, and ended the year in 73rd place on the Order of Merit. In subsequent seasons, he failed to win enough money to maintain his card on the European Tour several times but regained his playing status each time, via the Challenge Tour rankings in 2004, 2008, and 2019, and via qualifying school in 2007 and 2011.

In May 2021, in his 478th start on the European Tour, Bland achieved his first victory at the Betfred British Masters. At age 48, he became the oldest first-time winner on the European Tour; only Malcolm MacKenzie, with 509, had played more tournaments before claiming his first win on the tour. In June 2021, Bland played in the U.S. Open for just the second time in his career. At 48 years old, he became the oldest player to ever hold a share of the lead of the U.S. Open after two rounds, however he fell back over the weekend to finish in a tie for 50th. With eight top-10 finishes during the 2021 European Tour season, Bland finished a career-best 11th place on the Race to Dubai rankings.

In January 2022, Bland finished as runner-up at the Slync.io Dubai Desert Classic, losing to Viktor Hovland in a playoff.

Being just outside the Top 50 in the Official World Golf Ranking in March 2022, Bland looked to find form in order to qualify for the Masters Tournament. He won his group at the WGC-Dell Technologies Match Play, halving with Bryson DeChambeau as well as beating Talor Gooch and Lee Westwood along the way. However, he was defeated in the last 16 by Dustin Johnson, ultimately just missing out on progressing to the Top 50. Bland made his full PGA Tour debut the following week at the Valero Texas Open, needing a victory to get into The Masters. He recorded a Top-30 finish, seeing him move to a highest ranking of 48th.

In June 2022, Bland joined the inaugural LIV Golf Invitational Series. He was subsequently subject to fines and suspension from the European Tour for playing without a conflicting event release. After those sanctions were upheld by an independent arbitrator, in May 2023, the European Tour announced that he had resigned his membership of the tour.

=== Senior career ===
In May 2023, Bland applied for entry to the 2023 Senior Open Championship, to be played in late July, for which he had fulfilled one exemption category as a former European Tour winner being at the exact age of 50 years at the time of the championship. However, Bland was denied entry due to outstanding fines to the European Tour, related to breaching conflicting tournament regulations.

In 2023, while playing in the July LIV Golf event at Valderrama Golf Club, Bland was put on the clock for slow play early in the second round. On the 15th tee, he took 1 minute and 49 seconds to hit his drive, earning a two-stroke penalty, which was reportedly the first of its kind for LIV.

In May 2024, Bland won his first senior major at the KitchenAid Senior PGA Championship. In July 2024, he won his second senior major, defeating Hiroyuki Fujita in a playoff to win the U.S. Senior Open. In a quest to complete the "Bland Slam" (winning all senior majors in which he was eligible for), Bland was unable to enter The Senior Open Championship at the end of July at Carnoustie. Having not paid outstanding fines to the European Tour (DP World Tour), as the case in 2023, Bland was again denied entry to play.

== Amateur wins ==
- 1994 European Under 21 Championship

== Professional wins (4) ==
=== European Tour wins (1) ===
No.	Date	Tournament	Winning score	Margin of victory	Runner-up
1	15 May 2021	Betfred British Masters	−13 (68-69-72-66=275)	Playoff	(Italy) Guido Migliozzi

European Tour playoff record (1–2)

No.	Year	Tournament	Opponent(s)	Result
1	2002	Murphy's Irish Open	(Sweden) Niclas Fasth, (South Africa) Darren Fichardt, (Denmark) Søren Hansen	Hansen won with birdie on fourth extra hole Bland eliminated by birdie on second hole
2	2021	Betfred British Masters	(Italy) Guido Migliozzi	Won with par on first extra hole
3	2022	Slync.io Dubai Desert Classic	(Norway) Viktor Hovland	Lost to birdie on first extra hole

=== Challenge Tour wins (1) ===
Legend
Tour Championships (1)
Other Challenge Tour (0)

No.	Date	Tournament	Winning score	Margin of victory	Runner-up
1	4 Nov 2001	Challenge Tour Grand Final	−18 (69-68-66-63=266)	5 strokes	(England) Philip Golding

=== PGA Tour Champions wins (2) ===
Legend
Senior major championships (2)
Other PGA Tour Champions (0)

No.	Date	Tournament	Winning score	Margin of victory	Runner-up
1	26 May 2024	KitchenAid Senior PGA Championship	−17 (64-66-74-63=267)	3 strokes	(Australia) Richard Green
2	1 Jul 2024	U.S. Senior Open	−13 (68-64-69-66=267)	Playoff	(Japan) Hiroyuki Fujita

PGA Tour Champions playoff record (1–0)

No.	Year	Tournament	Opponent	Result
1	2024	U.S. Senior Open	(Japan) Hiroyuki Fujita	Won with par on second extra hole after two-hole aggregate playoff; Bland: E (4-4=8), Fujita: E (4-4=8)

== Results in major championships ==
Results not in chronological order in 2020.

Tournament	1998	1999
Masters Tournament		
U.S. Open		
The Open Championship	CUT	
PGA Championship		

Tournament	2000	2001	2002	2003	2004	2005	2006	2007	2008	2009
Masters Tournament										
U.S. Open										CUT
The Open Championship										
PGA Championship										

Tournament	2010	2011	2012	2013	2014	2015	2016	2017	2018
Masters Tournament									
U.S. Open									
The Open Championship								T22	
PGA Championship									

Tournament	2019	2020	2021	2022	2023	2024	2025
Masters Tournament							
PGA Championship				CUT			T37
U.S. Open			T50	T43			CUT
The Open Championship		NT	T67	CUT	T33		

Did not play

CUT = missed the half-way cut
"T" = tied
NT = no tournament due to COVID-19 pandemic

== Results in World Golf Championships ==
Tournament	2016	2017	2018	2019	2020	2021	2022
Championship							
Match Play					NT^{1}		R16
Invitational							
Champions	T30				NT^{1}	NT^{1}	NT^{1}

^{1}Cancelled due to COVID-19 pandemic

Top 10
Did not play

QF, R16, R32, R64 = Round in which player lost in match play
"T" = Tied
NT = No tournament
Note that the Championship and Invitational were discontinued from 2022.

== Senior major championships ==
=== Wins (2) ===
Year	Championship	54 holes	Winning score	Margin	Runner(s)-up
2024	KitchenAid Senior PGA Championship	1 shot deficit	−17 (64-66-74-63=267)	3 strokes	(Australia) Richard Green
2024	U.S. Senior Open	5 shot deficit	−13 (68-64-69-66=267)	Playoff	(Japan) Hiroyuki Fujita

=== Results timeline ===
Tournament	2024	2025
The Tradition		
Senior PGA Championship	1	T14
U.S. Senior Open	1	
Senior Players Championship		
The Senior Open Championship		

Win
Did not play

"T" indicates a tie for a place

== Team appearances ==
Amateur

- European Youths' Team Championship (representing England): 1994

== See also ==
- 2007 European Tour Qualifying School graduates
- 2008 Challenge Tour graduates
- 2011 European Tour Qualifying School graduates
- 2019 Challenge Tour graduates
