= Jumeirah Golf Estates =

Golf club

Coordinates: 25.01470°N 55.19292°E

- Interactive map of Jumeirah Golf Estates

Club information
- Location: Dubai, UAE
- Established: 2009
- Type: Private
- Owner: Jumeirah Golf Estates
- Tota holes: 36
- Tournaments: DP World Tour Championship, Dubai; Golf in Dubai Championship
- Website: www.jumeirahgolfestates.com

Fire
- Designed by: Greg Norman
- Par: 72
- Length: 7,480 yards
- Course record: 60: Matt Wallace (2023)

Earth
- Designed by: Greg Norman
- Par: 72
- Length: 7,708 yards
- Course record: 62: Justin Rose (2012)

Jumeirah Golf Estates is a luxury residential golf community along E 311 road, in Me'aisem 1, Dubai, United Arab Emirates. In 2021, it was rated among the top 10 lifestyle estates in the world.

Jumeirah Golf Estates consists of over 1,500 villas, townhouses, and apartments arranged into more than a dozen distinct communities, set alongside two Greg Norman-designed 18-hole golf courses, each with a different environmentally themed name – Fire and Earth. The Earth Course is the host venue for the DP World Tour Championship, Dubai, the season-ending tournament of the European Tour.

Jumeirah Golf Estates is served by its own metro station on the Route 2020 section of the Dubai Metro's Red Line, serving the Expo 2020 site to the south.
