= Turkish Airlines World Golf Cup =

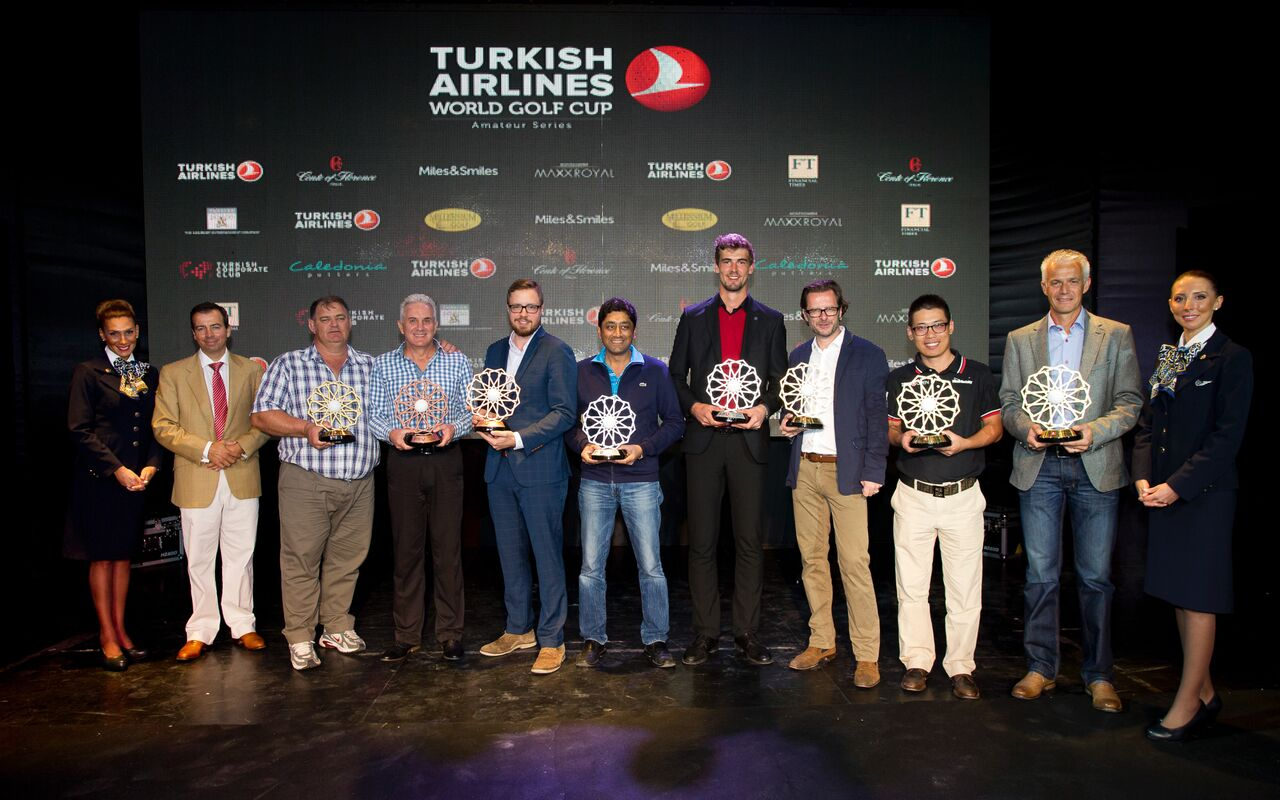
Winners of 2015 Turkish Airlines World Golf Cup Grand Final

The Turkish Airlines World Golf Cup is an annual corporate amateur golf tournament established by Turkish Airlines in 2013. Winners of global qualifiers meet at a Grand Final in Belek, Turkey in the same week as the Turkish Airlines Open.

The series started in 2013 with 12 events across the globe, increasing to 50 qualifiers in 2014, with around 4,500 players competing for 140 Grand Final places at 70 tournaments in 2015.

The 2016 tournament will expand to 100 different cities worldwide.

== 2013 Grand Final ==
The overall winner, Han Liang from China, played in the Turkish Airlines Open pro-am with former world number one Tiger Woods.

== 2014 Grand Final ==
Category A winner – Mitja Reinhart (Ljubljana) – 79 points over two rounds.

Category B winner - Joaquim Gallinal (Buenos Aires) – 77 points over two rounds.

The leading 10 Grand Finalists competed in the pro-am of the 2014 Turkish Airlines Open, the winners playing with Henrik Stenson and Martin Kaymer respectively.

== 2015 Grand Final ==
Category A winner – Pierre-Luc Fournier (Montreal) – 79 points

Category B winner – Neill Bam (Johannesburg) – 89 points.

Neill Bam (the leading player overall), played with Rory McIlroy in the Turkish Airlines Open pro-am.
