= Turkish Airlines Open =

Coordinates: 36.851°N 31.069°E

Tournament information
- Location: Belek, Antalya, Turkey
- Established: 2013
- Course: National Golf Club
- Par: 72
- Length: 7,287 yards (6,663 m)
- Tour: European Tour
- Format: Stroke play
- Prize fund: US$2,750,000
- Month played: April/May

Tournament record score
- Aggregate: 264 Victor Dubuisson (2013)
- To par: −24 as above

Current champion
- (Sweden) Mikael Lindberg

Final champion
- Location in Turkey

The Turkish Airlines Open is a European Tour golf tournament played annually in Turkey since 2013. In both 2013 and 2014 the tournament was the penultimate event of the European Tour Final Series.

== History ==
The first three tournaments were held at the Montgomerie Maxx Royal. In October 2015, it was announced that Turkish Airlines would continue as headline sponsor the tournament for a further three years and it moved to Regnum Carya Golf Club from 2016 and was played at the Montgomerie Maxx Royal once again in 2019.

Victor Dubuisson won the first event in 2013 by two shots from Jamie Donaldson.

In 2013, qualification was open to the top 50 in the Official World Golf Ranking three weeks before the event, five tournament invitations, three Turkish players, with the remainder from the 2013 Race to Dubai to make up a field of 78. Following the Turkish Airlines Open the leading 60 players in the Race to Dubai qualified for the season-ending DP World Tour Championship, Dubai, provided they had participated in two of the first three tournaments of the Final Series and played in enough 2013 European Tour events.

In 2014, qualification was open to the top 60 in the Official World Golf Ranking three weeks before the event, four tournament invitations, three Turkish players invited by the Turkish Golf Federation, with the remainder from the 2014 Race to Dubai to make up a field of 78. Following the Turkish Airlines Open the leading 60 players in the Race to Dubai will qualify for the season-ending DP World Tour Championship, Dubai. In 2016, qualification criteria were revised. The field consists of the top 70 available players from the Race to Dubai, three Turkish players, and five unrestricted tournament invitations. Alternates are drawn from the Race to Dubai standings beyond the top 70 available.

In 2015, the tournament was brought forward to the start of the Final Series due to the 2015 G-20 Antalya summit. Jaco van Zyl carded an opening round of 61 that would have broken the course record if preferred lies had not been in operation. The South African shared the lead with Victor Dubuisson going into the final round but the Frenchman birdied three of his last four holes on the way to a 66 that secured him his second win in Turkey and his second ever victory on the European Tour.

After a five-year absence, the tournament returned to the European Tour schedule in May 2025 and was played at Regnum Carya.

== Winners ==
European Tour (Rolex Series)	2017–2019
European Tour (Race to Dubai finals series)	2013–2016
European Tour (Regular)	2025–

#	Year	Winner	Score	To par	Margin of victory	Runner(s)-up	Purse (US$)	Winner's share ($)	Venue
9th	2026	(Sweden) Mikael Lindberg	278	−10	2 strokes	(Italy) Guido Migliozzi (Portugal) Daniel Rodrigues	2,750,000	467,500	National GC
8th	2025	(France) Martin Couvra	267	−17	2 strokes	(Spain) Jorge Campillo (China) Li Haotong	2,750,000	467,500	Regnum Carya
2020–2024: No tournament
–	2020	Cancelled due to the COVID-19 pandemic							
7th	2019	(England) Tyrrell Hatton	264	−20	Playoff	(France) Benjamin Hébert (United States) Kurt Kitayama (France) Victor Perez (Austria) Matthias Schwab (South Africa) Erik van Rooyen	7,000,000	2,000,000	Montgomerie Maxx
6th	2018	(England) Justin Rose (2)	267	−17	Playoff	(China) Li Haotong	7,000,000	1,166,660	Regnum Carya
5th	2017	(England) Justin Rose	266	−18	1 stroke	(Belgium) Nicolas Colsaerts (South Africa) Dylan Frittelli	7,000,000	1,166,660	Regnum Carya
4th	2016	(Denmark) Thorbjørn Olesen	264	−20	3 strokes	(England) David Horsey (China) Li Haotong	7,000,000	1,166,600	Regnum Carya
3rd	2015	(France) Victor Dubuisson (2)	266	−22	1 stroke	(South Africa) Jaco van Zyl	7,000,000	1,166,600	Montgomerie Maxx
2nd	2014	(United States) Brooks Koepka	271	−17	1 stroke	(England) Ian Poulter	7,000,000	1,166,600	Montgomerie Maxx
1st	2013	(France) Victor Dubuisson	264	−24	2 strokes	(Wales) Jamie Donaldson	7,000,000	1,166,600	Montgomerie Maxx

== See also ==
- Open golf tournament
- World Golf Final
- Turkish Airlines World Golf Cup
