= World Golf Final =

Golf tournament

Turkish Airlines World Golf Final
Tournament information
- Location: Belek, Antalya, Turkey
- Established: 2012
- Course(s): Antalya Golf Club; Sultan course
- Par: 71
- Tour: None
- Format: Medal match play
- Prize fund: US$5.2 million
- Month played: October
- Final year: 2012

Final champion
- (England) Justin Rose defeated (England) Lee Westwood by 1 stroke

The Turkish Airlines World Golf Final was a golf tournament that was played on the 9–12 October 2012 in Turkey. This tournament took place at the Antalya Golf Club, Sultan course, in Belek, on the Turkish Riviera. It featured four of the five top ranked players: Rory McIlroy, Tiger Woods, Lee Westwood and Justin Rose in an eight-player field. They competed for a first prize of $1.5 million from a total purse of $5.2 million.

The tournament was an unofficial money event as it was not sanctioned by any tour. It was only staged once in 2012. It was replaced by the Turkish Airlines Open in 2013 which was part of the European Tour.

Because the event conflicted with the PGA Tour's Frys.com Open, all eight players had to be granted releases by the PGA Tour, in exchange for which they agreed to play the Frys.com Open at least once in the next three years.

== Format ==
The format of the competition was medal match play, with the eight players divided into two pools of four. After round-robin play in each pool, the top two players in each pool advanced to the semi-finals, with the winners meeting in the final.

== Participants ==
Player	Rank
(Northern Ireland) Rory McIlroy	1
(United States) Tiger Woods	2
(England) Lee Westwood	4
(England) Justin Rose	5
(United States) Webb Simpson	8
(United States) Matt Kuchar	15
(United States) Hunter Mahan	20
(South Africa) Charl Schwartzel	30

== Pool play ==
=== Round 1 ===
Pool	Winner	Loser	Score
A	(United States) Matt Kuchar	(Northern Ireland) Rory McIlroy	70–76
A	(South Africa) Charl Schwartzel	(United States) Tiger Woods	69–70
B	(England) Justin Rose	(United States) Hunter Mahan	71–75
B	(England) Lee Westwood	(United States) Webb Simpson	72–73

=== Round 2 ===
Pool	Winner	Loser	Score
A	(South Africa) Charl Schwartzel	(Northern Ireland) Rory McIlroy	70–71
A	(United States) Tiger Woods	(United States) Matt Kuchar	67–72
B	(England) Justin Rose	(England) Lee Westwood	66–69
B	(United States) Webb Simpson	(United States) Hunter Mahan	65–67

=== Round 3 ===
Pool	Winner	Loser	Score
A	(South Africa) Charl Schwartzel	(United States) Matt Kuchar	63–65
A	(United States) Tiger Woods	(Northern Ireland) Rory McIlroy	64–70
B	(England) Justin Rose	(United States) Webb Simpson	62–67
B	(England) Lee Westwood	(United States) Hunter Mahan	64–69

=== Standings ===
Pool A

Player	W–L	Total score
(South Africa) Charl Schwartzel	3–0	202 (−11)
(United States) Tiger Woods	2–1	201 (−12)
(United States) Matt Kuchar	1–2	207 (−6)
(Northern Ireland) Rory McIlroy	0–3	217 (+4)

Pool B

Player	W–L	Total score
(England) Justin Rose	3–0	199 (−14)
(England) Lee Westwood	2–1	205 (−8)
(United States) Webb Simpson	1–2	205 (−8)
(United States) Hunter Mahan	0–3	211 (−2)

== Finals ==
Semi-finals
1	(England) Justin Rose	69
4	(United States) Tiger Woods	70
3	(England) Lee Westwood	61
2	(South Africa) Charl Schwartzel	67

Final
(England) Justin Rose	66
(England) Lee Westwood	67

== Prize money ==
Place	Player	Earnings (US$)
1	(England) Justin Rose	1,500,000
2	(England) Lee Westwood	1,000,000
T3	(South Africa) Charl Schwartzel	600,000
T3	(United States) Tiger Woods	600,000
T5	(United States) Webb Simpson	450,000
T5	(United States) Matt Kuchar	450,000
T7	(United States) Hunter Mahan	300,000
T7	(Northern Ireland) Rory McIlroy	300,000
