= Justin Rose =

English professional golfer (born 1980)

Justin Rose MBE
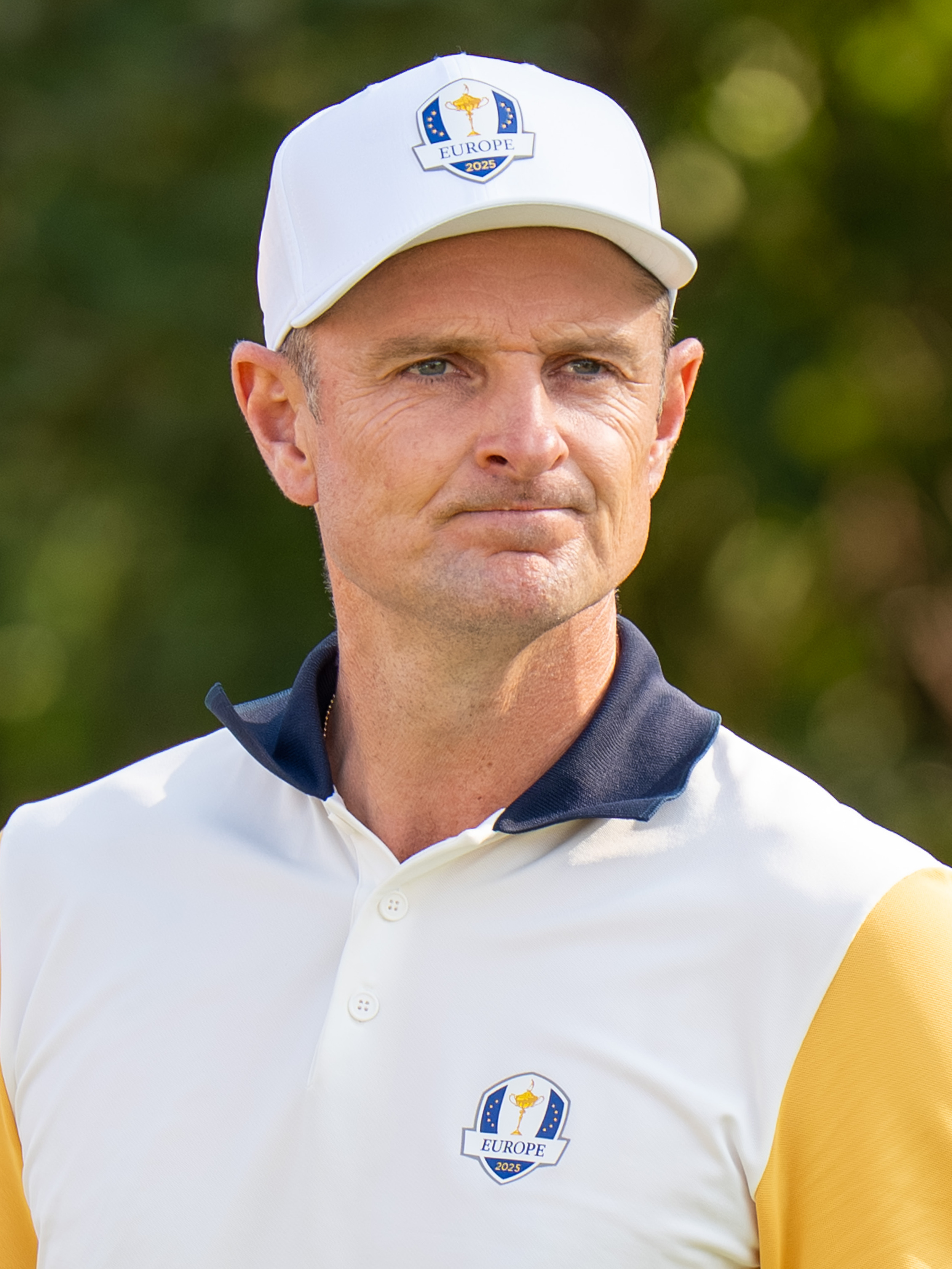
- Rose at the 2025 Ryder Cup

Personal information
- Full name: Justin Peter Rose
- Nickname: Rosie
- Nationality: England
- Born: 30 July 1980 (age 46) Johannesburg, South Africa
- Height: 6 ft 3 in (1.91 m)
- Weight: 195 lb (88 kg)
- Spouse: Kate Phillips (m. 2006)
- Children: 2

Career
- Sport: Golf
- Turned professional: 1998
- Current tours: PGA Tour; European Tour
- Former tour: Sunshine Tour
- Professional wins: 27
- Highest ranking: 1 (9 September 2018) (13 weeks)

Number of wins by tour
- PGA Tour: 13
- European Tour: 11
- Japan Golf Tour: 1
- Asian Tour: 1
- Sunshine Tour: 2
- PGA Tour of Australasia: 1
- Other: 3

Best results in major championships (wins: 1)
- Masters Tournament: 2nd/T2: 2015, 2017, 2025
- PGA Championship: T3: 2012
- U.S. Open: Won: 2013
- The Open Championship: T2: 2018, 2024

Achievements and awards
- European Tour Order of Merit winner: 2007
- PGA Tour FedEx Cup winner: 2018
- Payne Stewart Award: 2021
Medal record
Representing Great Britain
Olympic Games
Gold medal – first place	2016 Rio de Janeiro	Individual

Justin Peter Rose (born 30 July 1980) is an English professional golfer who plays on the PGA Tour and the European Tour. He is a former world number one in the Official World Golf Ranking. He has won one major championship, the 2013 U.S. Open.

At age 17, Rose came to prominence when he finished in fourth place as an amateur at the 1998 Open Championship. He turned professional the next day but struggled at the start of his career, making few cuts. Rose won his first European Tour title in 2002 and led the tour's Order of Merit in 2007. In the ensuing years, Rose won a number of notable tournaments on the PGA Tour, culminating with his win at the 2013 U.S. Open.

Rose earned a gold medal at the 2016 Summer Olympics and reached number one in the world rankings for the first time in 2018. Since his U.S. Open victory, Rose has finished runner-up at five major championships: twice at the Open Championship and three times at the Masters Tournament.

== Early life ==
Rose was born on 30 July 1980 in Johannesburg, South Africa, to English parents, Annie and Ken. The family moved to England when Rose was five, and he started to play golf at Tylney Park Golf Club. He then moved on to Southwood Golf Club, Hartley Wintney Golf Club, Royal Winchester Golf Club and finally North Hants Golf Club. All of these clubs were near his then home in Hook, Hampshire.

Rose broke 70 for the first time at the age of 11 and was a plus three handicap by 14.

== Amateur career ==
Rose played in the Walker Cup in 1997 as a 17-year-old. Later in the year, Rose burst to worldwide prominence at the 1998 Open Championship held at Royal Birkdale Golf Club. He holed out for birdie from the rough from about 50 yards on the 18th hole to finish in a tie for fourth. He won the silver medal for the low amateur.

== Professional career ==
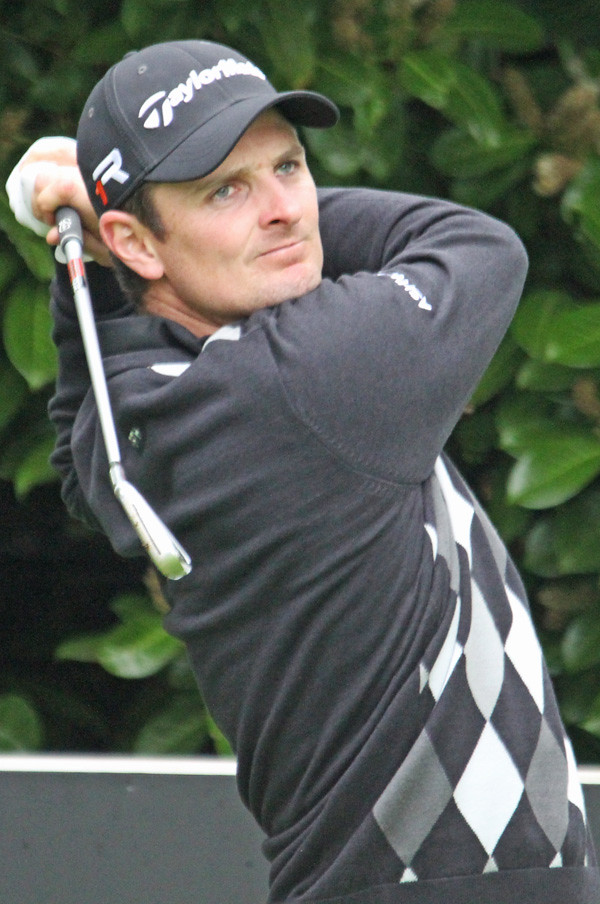
Rose at the 2013 BMW PGA Championship

=== European Tour ===
The day after his success at the 1998 Open Championship, Rose turned professional. Rose struggled badly in his early career. He missed the cut in his first 21 consecutive events, including the European Tour qualifying school in 1998. He earned his first European Tour card when he finished 4th at the qualifying school in 1999. The following season he failed to retain his card and had to revisit the qualifying school, where he finished 9th.

Despite his early career struggles, Rose's career soon began to take off and he became established on the European Tour. In 2001, he opened the season with consecutive second-place finishes in South Africa. He went on to finish the year in top-40 on the Order of Merit. He won his first professional event, the Dunhill Championship in South Africa, in 2002, and followed this up with three further victories in that year. They included another win in South Africa at the Nashua Masters, a win on the Japan Golf Tour at The Crowns Tournament, and then he won his second European Tour title at the Victor Chandler British Masters, edging out Ian Poulter in the final round.

In 2003, Rose reached number 33 in the Official World Golf Ranking. He earned enough money to claim his PGA Tour card as a non-member for 2004 after finishing with more money than the 125th ranked player on the money list. In 2004, he played mostly in America on the PGA Tour while also maintaining his membership on the European Tour. He did not have a great year and slipped out of the top 50 in the world rankings; however, he kept his tour card after earning in excess of a million dollars.

His ranking continued to fall in early 2005, and in March he announced that he was quitting the European Tour and concentrating on playing on the PGA Tour. This had no apparent effect on his poor form, and by the middle of the year, he had fallen out of the World's top 100. In August of that year, he made an about-face by announcing his intention to return to the European Tour. Later the same week he had his best result of the year, leading the Buick Championship in Connecticut after three rounds before slipping to a third-place finish. A couple of further good results followed late in the 2005 season, and he maintained his status on the PGA Tour after all.

In September 2006 at the Canadian Open, Rose led a PGA Tour tournament going into the final round for the first time. But he slipped up with a final round 74 which moved him down the field. He went on to finish 2nd at the Valero Texas Open and finished 47th on the money list with US$1.629 million in prize money. In November 2006 he won the Australian Masters, to claim his first title in four years. His renewed consistency, including a top 5 finish at the 2007 Masters, saw him surpass his previous best world ranking, by reaching number 26 on 8 April 2007.

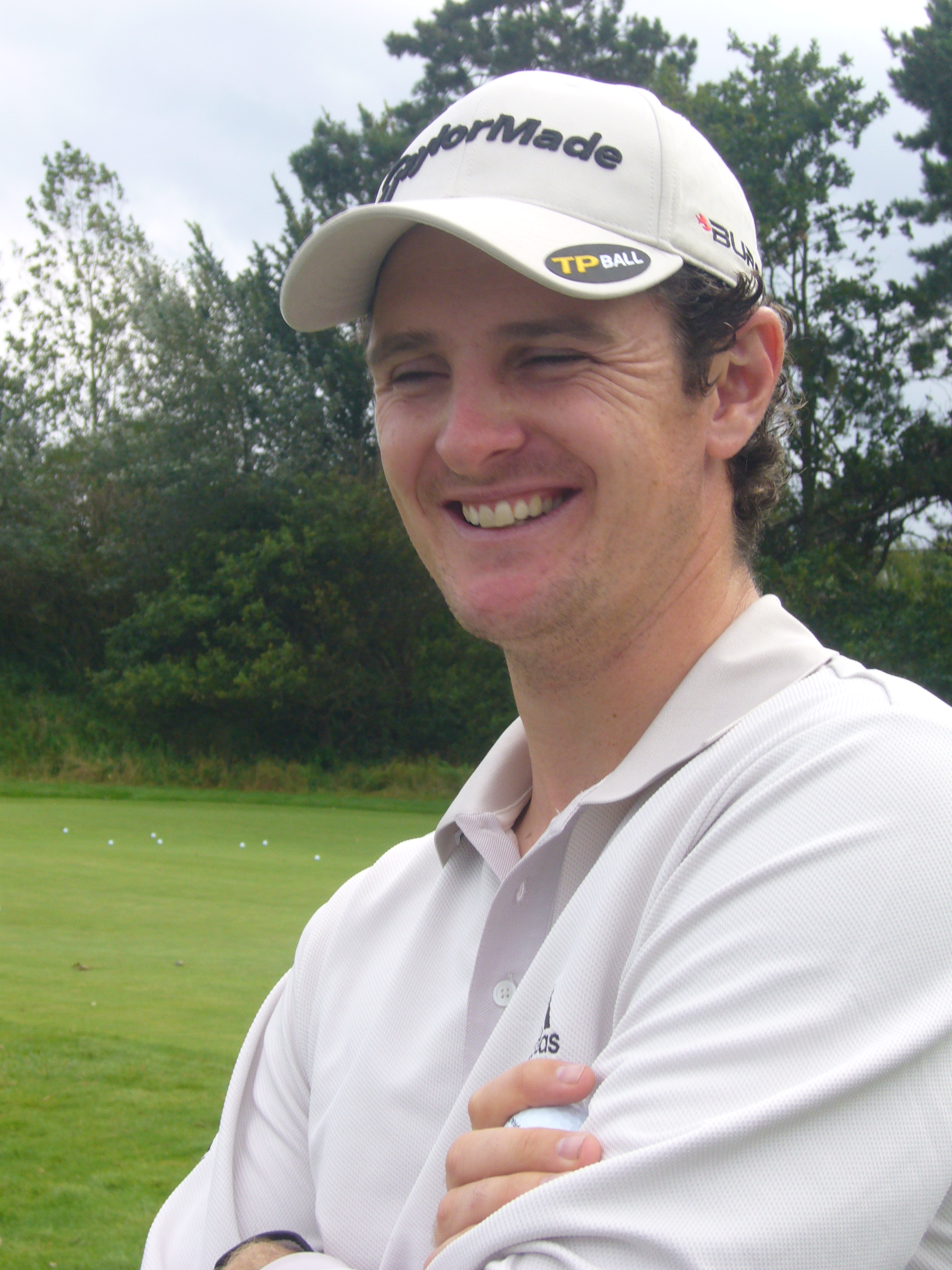
Rose at the 2008 KLM Open

Rose lost in a playoff at the 2007 BMW PGA Championship but moved into the top twenty of the World Rankings for the first time. By October he had reached a new career high of 12 and became the top-ranked British golfer. Rose won the European Tour Order of Merit title for 2007 in a thrilling climax to the season at the Volvo Masters, which he won in a playoff on 4 November. His new world ranking of number 7 made him the top-ranked European golfer for the first time, and he subsequently moved up to sixth in the rankings. Since the end of 2009, Canadian golf instructor Sean Foley coaches Rose.

=== PGA Tour ===
In 2010, Rose had a third place at the Honda Classic in Florida, and then he broke through with a victory at the Memorial Tournament in Ohio with a final round 66 to win by three strokes over Rickie Fowler. This was his first win on American soil. The next day, Rose had to try to qualify for the U.S. Open, along with runner-up Rickie Fowler. Neither qualified, which raised questions about the qualification process of the U.S. Open. In his first tournament start since the Memorial, at the Travelers Championship (Connecticut) two weeks later, Rose led by three shots entering the final round but fell away to a tie for ninth. His good form continued the following week at the AT&T National where he shot a final-round even par 70 to win the tournament.

In 2011, Rose continued with success. He entered the final round of the Transitions Championship (Florida) with a one-stroke lead. However, he shot a three-over-par 74, including four consecutive bogeys, in the middle of the round to finish five shots behind champion Gary Woodland. In September 2011, Rose played the BMW Championship at Cog Hill Golf & Country Club (Illinois), the third of the four FedEx Cup playoff events. A flawless round of 63 on the opening day helped Rose to build a four stroke advantage going into the final round. Even though there was a late wobble with a bogey at the par-5 15th hole, Rose recovered and won by two strokes from John Senden.

In 2012, Rose played World Golf Championship event at the WGC-Cadillac Championship at Doral Golf Resort & Spa. He entered the final round three strokes behind Bubba Watson. However, Rose played well in the final round and took a two-stroke lead entering the par-4 18th hole. He found the right rough with his tee shot and could not get up and down from the back of the green, making bogey. This left Watson requiring a birdie to tie Rose. Watson hit an iron shot from the right hand rough to within ten feet but could not make the birdie putt giving Rose the biggest win of his career. At the 2012 PGA Championship, Rose recorded his best ever performance in a major championship with a T-3. At the 2012 Ryder Cup, Rose played a major part in Team Europe's comeback against the United States. Rose holed putts of 10, 35, and 12 feet on the final three holes to defeat Phil Mickelson 1 up. On 12 October 2012, Rose won the 8-man Turkish Airlines World Golf Final defeating Lee Westwood by a single stroke in the final. He also beat Tiger Woods by a stroke in the semi-final after progressing from his group with a 100% record. On 25 March 2013, Rose finished second to Tiger Woods at the Arnold Palmer Invitational and rose to a career-high of third in the world rankings.

In June 2013, Rose played the U.S. Open. Rose entered the final round two strokes behind leader Phil Mickelson at one-over-par. In the final round, Rose birdied the 6th and the 7th holes to tie the lead. Rose three-putted the 11th for bogey to fall back to one-over-par for the tournament. Around the same time, Mickelson holed his second shot from the fairway at the par-4 10th for eagle to regain the lead. However, Rose responded with birdies at the 12th and 13th holes to move back into the solo lead. Rose could not get up and down from a bunker on the 14th hole, however, and a bogey on the 16th hole dropped him to level for the day. However, Mickelson recorded bogeys at the 13th and 15th holes to remain one shot behind Rose. At the par-4 18th hole, Rose hit a 4-iron approach to the back of green to ensure par. The shot was reminiscent of Hogan's own shot from about the same area, landing his approach on the green and two putting for the victory, as Hogan had in 1950.

He had the clubhouse lead. Mickelson, needing a birdie at the last to tie Rose, blocked his drive and could not reach the green in two. He hit his pitch shot near the pin but could not hole it. Rose won the tournament by two over Mickelson and Jason Day. He became the first Englishman to win the U.S. Open since Tony Jacklin in 1970.

In June 2014, Rose won the Quicken Loans National defeating Shawn Stefani on the first hole of a sudden-death playoff. Two weeks later, Rose won the Aberdeen Asset Management Scottish Open. At the 2014 Ryder Cup, Rose emerged as the leading points-getter, amassing four points in a 3-0-2 performance, as Europe won. At the 2015 Masters Tournament, Rose finished in a tie for second with Phil Mickelson behind winner Jordan Spieth. Two weeks later he won his seventh PGA Tour tournament at the Zurich Classic of New Orleans. In October, he won the UBS Hong Kong Open on the European Tour defeating Lucas Bjerregaard by one stroke.

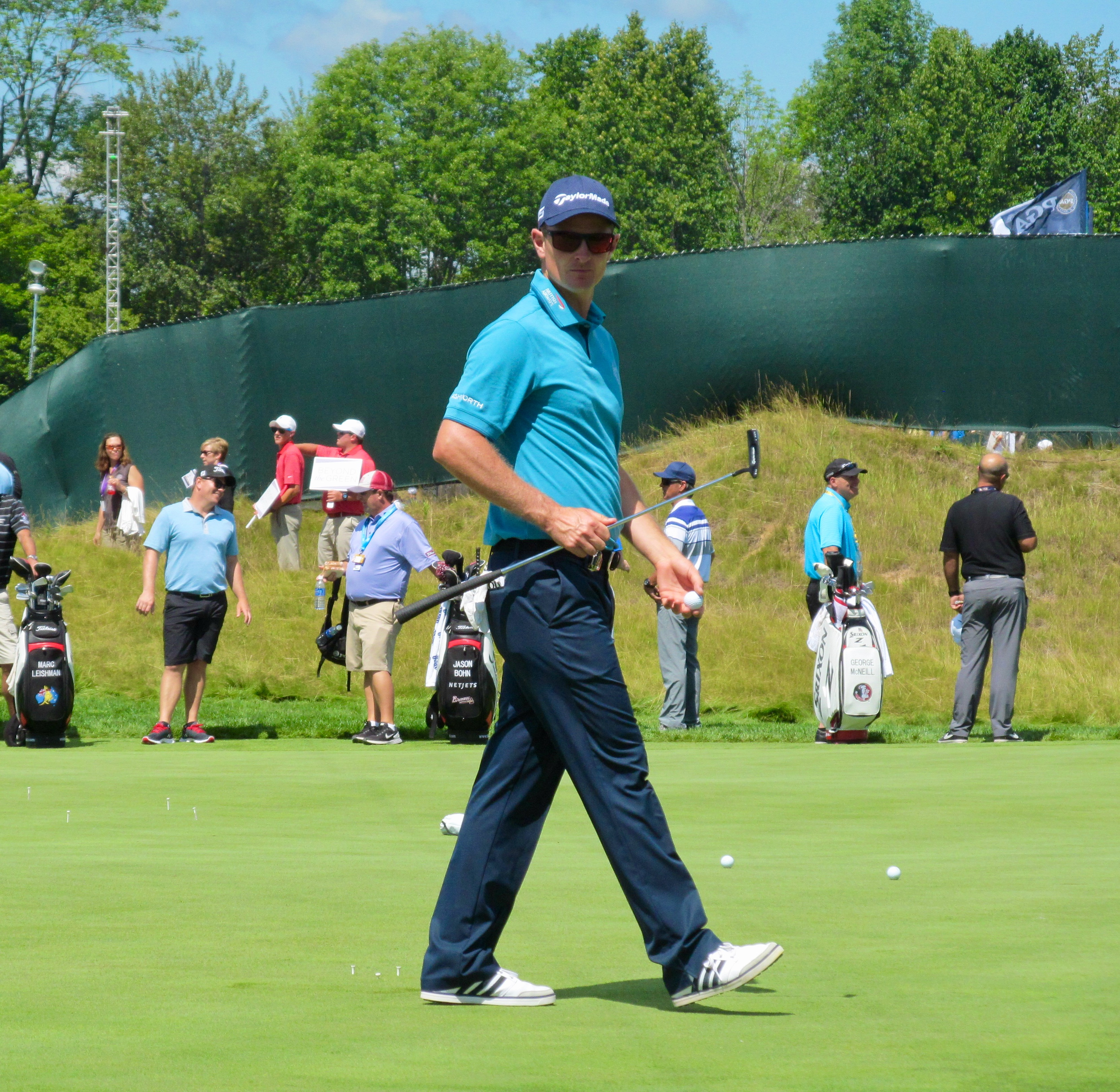
Rose at the 2015 PGA Championship

Rose earned rights to represent the United Kingdom at the 2016 Olympics in Rio de Janeiro. On the opening day, he became the first ever player to make a hole-in-one in Olympic play after recording it on the 189-yard par-3 4th hole of Gil Hanse's new Olympic Course in Barra da Tijuca using a 7-iron. Described as having an inspiring effect on the rest of the Great Britain team, Rose later gave the golf ball from that hole-in-one to gymnast Nile Wilson, who would go on to win a bronze medal in the horizontal bar. Rose went to the 18th hole on Sunday tied at −15 with playing partner Henrik Stenson of Sweden. Rose then produced a backspin pitch that left him with a short birdie putt which he converted while Stenson underhit his approach and eventually three-putted for bogey. Rose won the gold medal. Shortly thereafter, Rose brought his Olympic gold medal to The Barclays at Bethpage Black and wore it around his neck, on the suggestion of playing partner Phil Mickelson's caddy Jim "Bones" McKay and to cheers from the gallery, during his final putt. In April 2017, Rose shot opening rounds of 71-72 at the Masters to enter the weekend as one of only a handful of players under par. In the third round, he fired a five-under round of 67 to co-lead through 54 holes with Sergio García. His round consisted of seven birdies, which resulted in a 31 on the back nine to move into contention for his second major championship. Rose ultimately lost to García in a sudden-death playoff. In October, Rose played the WGC-HSBC Champions. He was tied for fourth place, eight strokes behind leader Dustin Johnson after the third round. However, in the final round Rose shot a 67 to Johnson's 77 to win by two strokes. Late in the year, Rose won the Turkish Airlines Open, a Rolex Series event, on the European Tour and the Indonesian Masters, an Asian Tour event. In December 2017, it was announced that Rose would be the host of the 2018 British Masters. He opted to take the event to Walton Heath Golf Club.

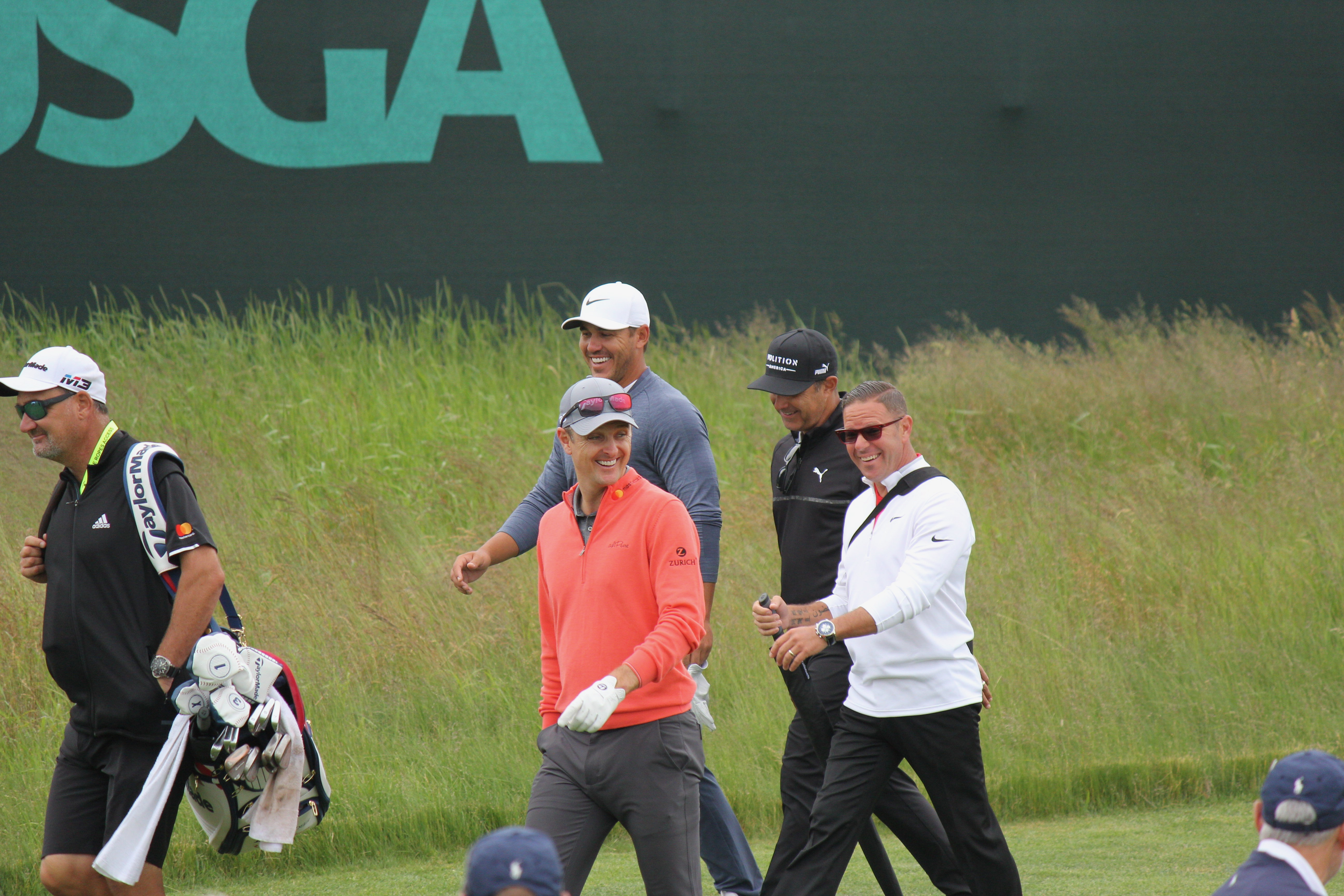
Rose with Brooks Koepka at the 2018 U.S. Open.

In May 2018, Rose won the Fort Worth Invitational on the PGA Tour. Two months later, in July, Rose tied for second with a score of six-under-par at the 2018 Open Championship. His cumulative score of twelve-under-par across all four 2018 major championships was the best amongst everyone who made the cut in all four tournaments. In September 2018, he placed high in two FedEx Cup Playoffs events, finishing second at the Dell Technologies Championship and losing a playoff to Keegan Bradley at the BMW Championship. Those finishes moved Rose to World Number One in the Official World Golf Ranking. The next week, Rose finished T4 at the Tour Championship to win the season-long FedEx Cup and $10,000,000. Rose was part of the winning European team at the 2018 Ryder Cup at Le Golf National outside of Paris, France. On 4 November 2018, Rose successfully defended his title at the Turkish Airlines Open with a playoff victory over Li Haotong. This victory returned Rose to World Number One and earned him $1,166,660.

In January 2019, Rose won the Farmers Insurance Open on the PGA Tour. Around this time, he announced new sponsors. He transitioned from TaylorMade Golf to Honma in a 10-club deal. He also switched from Adidas to Bonobos for his clothing. In May 2020, the deal with Honma was cancelled by Rose, however, after he fell from #1 to #14 in the world rankings. In June, Rose finished tied for 3rd at the U.S. Open at Pebble Beach Golf Links in Pebble Beach, California.

In February 2023, Rose ended a four-year winless streak when he won the AT&T Pebble Beach Pro-Am. He shot a final-round 66 to win by three shots over Brendon Todd and Brandon Wu.

In September 2023, Rose played on the European team in the 2023 Ryder Cup at Marco Simone Golf and Country Club in Guidonia, Rome, Italy. The European team won 16.5–11.5 and Rose went 1–1–1 including a loss in his Sunday singles match against Patrick Cantlay.

In July 2024, Rose had to come through the hard route of playing at the Open by coming through Final Qualifying at Burnham & Berrow. Despite this, Rose went on to tie for runner-up in the 2024 event for the second time at Royal Troon.

Rose was runner-up at the 2025 Masters Tournament after going to a playoff against Rory McIlroy after both tied at −11, Rose having made up seven shots on the final round after scoring 66. Rose parred the playoff hole and McIlroy won with a birdie. This was the second time that Rose had tied for first in the Masters in the regulation 72 holes and lost in a sudden-death playoff. The only other player to lose two Masters playoffs is Ben Hogan, in 1942 and 1954 when the playoffs were over 18 holes.

In August 2025, Rose won the FedEx St. Jude Championship with a birdie on the third playoff hole to defeat J. J. Spaun.

In February 2026, Rose won the Farmers Insurance Open for his 13th career PGA Tour victory. Rose broke the 72-hole record for the tournament at 23-under 265, a record that was shared by Tiger Woods and George Burns. Rose also became the first wire-to-wire winner at the tournament since Tommy Bolt in 1955.

In April 2026, it was announced that Rose would be using irons manufactured by McLaren, the British luxury automotive manufacturer, as they entered the golf market.

== Personal life ==
Rose married long-time girlfriend Kate Phillips, a former international gymnast, in December 2006. They have a house in Albany, New Providence in The Bahamas, and a riverside flat in the London suburb of Putney. Kate gave birth to their first child, a son, in February 2009. In January 2012, they had a daughter.

Rose is an advocate of sustainable golf facilities and works as an ambassador to the STRI's Golf Environment Awards, hosting receptions for winners.

== Awards and honours ==
- Rose was appointed Member of the Order of the British Empire in the 2017 New Year Honours for services to golf.
- In 2021, he was named as the recipient of the PGA Tour's Payne Stewart Award for his character, sportsmanship, and a commitment to charity.
- In 2023 Rose won the Nicklaus-Jacklin Award at the 2023 Ryder Cup.

== Amateur wins ==
- 1995 McGregor Trophy, Carris Trophy
- 1997 St Andrews Links Trophy
- 1998 Peter McEvoy Trophy

== Professional wins (27) ==
=== PGA Tour wins (13) ===
Legend
Major championships (1)
World Golf Championships (2)
FedEx Cup playoff events (2)
Other PGA Tour (8)

No.	Date	Tournament	Winning score	To par	Margin of victory	Runner(s)-up
1	6 Jun 2010	Memorial Tournament	65-69-70-66=270	−18	3 strokes	(United States) Rickie Fowler
2	4 Jul 2010	AT&T National	69-64-67-70=270	−10	1 stroke	(United States) Ryan Moore
3	18 Sep 2011	BMW Championship	63-68-69-71=271	−13	2 strokes	(Australia) John Senden
4	11 Mar 2012	WGC-Cadillac Championship	69-64-69-70=272	−16	1 stroke	(United States) Bubba Watson
5	16 Jun 2013	U.S. Open	71-69-71-70=281	+1	2 strokes	(Australia) Jason Day, (United States) Phil Mickelson
6	29 Jun 2014	Quicken Loans National (2)	74-65-71-70=280	−4	Playoff	(United States) Shawn Stefani
7	26 Apr 2015	Zurich Classic of New Orleans	69-66-65-66=266	−22	1 stroke	(United States) Cameron Tringale
8	29 Oct 2017	WGC-HSBC Champions	67-68-72-67=274	−14	2 strokes	(United States) Dustin Johnson, (United States) Brooks Koepka, (Sweden) Henrik Stenson
9	27 May 2018	Fort Worth Invitational	66-64-66-64=260	−20	3 strokes	(United States) Brooks Koepka
10	27 Jan 2019	Farmers Insurance Open	63-66-69-69=267	−21	2 strokes	(Australia) Adam Scott
11	6 Feb 2023	AT&T Pebble Beach Pro-Am	69-69-65-66=269	−18	3 strokes	(United States) Brendon Todd, (United States) Brandon Wu
12	10 Aug 2025	FedEx St. Jude Championship	64-66-67-67=264	−16	Playoff	(United States) J. J. Spaun
13	1 Feb 2026	Farmers Insurance Open (2)	62-65-68-70=265	−23	7 strokes	(United States) Pierceson Coody, (Japan) Ryo Hisatsune, (South Korea) Kim Si-woo

PGA Tour playoff record (2–4)

No.	Year	Tournament	Opponent	Result
1	2014	Quicken Loans National	(United States) Shawn Stefani	Won with par on first extra hole
2	2015	Memorial Tournament	(Sweden) David Lingmerth	Lost to par on third extra hole
3	2017	Masters Tournament	(Spain) Sergio García	Lost to birdie on first extra hole
4	2018	BMW Championship	(United States) Keegan Bradley	Lost to par on first extra hole
5	2025	Masters Tournament	(Northern Ireland) Rory McIlroy	Lost to birdie on first extra hole
6	2025	FedEx St. Jude Championship	(United States) J. J. Spaun	Won with birdie on third extra hole

=== European Tour wins (11) ===
Legend
Major championships (1)
World Golf Championships (2)
Tour Championships (1)
Rolex Series (2)
Other European Tour (5)

No.	Date	Tournament	Winning score	To par	Margin of victory	Runner(s)-up
1	20 Jan 2002	Dunhill Championship^{1}	71-66-66-65=268	−20	2 strokes	(England) Mark Foster, (South Africa) Retief Goosen, (South Africa) Martin Maritz
2	2 Jun 2002	Victor Chandler British Masters	70-69-65-65=269	−19	1 stroke	(England) Ian Poulter
3	26 Nov 2006 (2007 season)	MasterCard Masters^{2}	69-66-68-73=276	−12	2 strokes	(Australia) Greg Chalmers, (Australia) Richard Green
4	4 Nov 2007	Volvo Masters	70-68-71-74=283	−1	Playoff	(England) Simon Dyson, (Denmark) Søren Kjeldsen
5	11 Mar 2012	WGC-Cadillac Championship	69-64-69-70=272	−16	1 stroke	(United States) Bubba Watson
6	16 Jun 2013	U.S. Open	71-69-71-70=281	+1	2 strokes	(Australia) Jason Day, (United States) Phil Mickelson
7	13 Jul 2014	Aberdeen Asset Management Scottish Open	69-68-66-65=268	−16	2 strokes	(Sweden) Kristoffer Broberg
8	25 Oct 2015	UBS Hong Kong Open^{3}	65-66-64-68=263	−17	1 stroke	(Denmark) Lucas Bjerregaard
9	29 Oct 2017	WGC-HSBC Champions	67-68-72-67=274	−14	2 strokes	(United States) Dustin Johnson, (United States) Brooks Koepka, (Sweden) Henrik Stenson
10	5 Nov 2017	Turkish Airlines Open	69-68-64-65=266	−18	1 stroke	(Belgium) Nicolas Colsaerts, (South Africa) Dylan Frittelli
11	4 Nov 2018	Turkish Airlines Open (2)	65-65-69-68=267	−17	Playoff	(China) Li Haotong

^{1}Co-sanctioned by the Sunshine Tour
^{2}Co-sanctioned by the PGA Tour of Australasia
^{3}Co-sanctioned by the Asian Tour

European Tour playoff record (2–3)

No.	Year	Tournament	Opponent(s)	Result
1	2007	BMW PGA Championship	(Denmark) Anders Hansen	Lost to birdie on first extra hole
2	2007	Volvo Masters	(England) Simon Dyson, (Denmark) Søren Kjeldsen	Won with birdie on second extra hole
3	2017	Masters Tournament	(Spain) Sergio García	Lost to birdie on first extra hole
4	2018	Turkish Airlines Open	(China) Li Haotong	Won with par on first extra hole
5	2025	Masters Tournament	(Northern Ireland) Rory McIlroy	Lost to birdie on first extra hole

=== Japan Golf Tour wins (1) ===
No.	Date	Tournament	Winning score	To par	Margin of victory	Runner-up
1	5 May 2002	The Crowns	64-70-63-69=266	−14	5 strokes	(Thailand) Prayad Marksaeng

=== Asian Tour wins (2) ===
Legend
Flagship events (1)
Other Asian Tour (1)

No.	Date	Tournament	Winning score	To par	Margin of victory	Runner-up
1	25 Oct 2015	UBS Hong Kong Open^{1}	65-66-64-68=263	−17	1 stroke	(Denmark) Lucas Bjerregaard
2	17 Dec 2017	Indonesian Masters	62-69-66-62=259	−29	8 strokes	(Thailand) Phachara Khongwatmai

^{1}Co-sanctioned by the European Tour

=== Sunshine Tour wins (2) ===
No.	Date	Tournament	Winning score	To par	Margin of victory	Runner(s)-up
1	20 Jan 2002	Dunhill Championship^{1}	71-66-66-65=268	−20	2 strokes	(England) Mark Foster, (South Africa) Retief Goosen, (South Africa) Martin Maritz
2	9 Feb 2002	Nashua Masters	64-68-65-68=265	−15	1 stroke	(South Africa) Titch Moore

^{1}Co-sanctioned by the European Tour

=== Other wins (3) ===
No.	Date	Tournament	Winning score	To par	Margin of victory	Runner-up
1	14 Nov 2004	Bilt Skins Game	$42,500		$7,000	(Sweden) Daniel Chopra
2	12 Oct 2012	Turkish Airlines World Golf Final	66	−5	1 stroke	(England) Lee Westwood
3	14 Aug 2016	Olympic Games	67-69-65-67=268	−16	2 strokes	(Sweden) Henrik Stenson

== Major championships ==
=== Wins (1) ===
Year	Championship	54 holes	Winning score	Margin	Runners-up
2013	U.S. Open	2 shot deficit	+1 (71-69-71-70=281)	2 strokes	(Australia) Jason Day, (United States) Phil Mickelson

=== Results timeline ===
Results not in chronological order in 2020.

Tournament	1998	1999
Masters Tournament		
U.S. Open		
The Open Championship	T4_{LA}	CUT
PGA Championship		

Tournament	2000	2001	2002	2003	2004	2005	2006	2007	2008	2009
Masters Tournament				T39	T22			T5	T36	T20
U.S. Open				T5	CUT			T10	CUT	CUT
The Open Championship		T30	T22	CUT				T12	T70	T13
PGA Championship			T23	CUT	CUT		T41	T12	T9	CUT

Tournament	2010	2011	2012	2013	2014	2015	2016	2017	2018
Masters Tournament		T11	T8	T25	T14	T2	T10	2	T12
U.S. Open		CUT	T21	1	T12	T27	CUT	CUT	T10
The Open Championship	CUT	T44	CUT	CUT	T23	T6	T22	T54	T2
PGA Championship	CUT	CUT	T3	T33	T24	4	T22	CUT	T19

Tournament	2019	2020	2021	2022	2023	2024	2025	2026
Masters Tournament	CUT	T23	7	CUT	T16	CUT	2	T3
PGA Championship	T29	9	T8	T13	T9	T6	CUT	T10
U.S. Open	T3	CUT	CUT	T37	CUT	CUT	CUT	T11
The Open Championship	T20	NT	T46		CUT	T2	T16	CUT

Win
Top 10
Did not play

LA = low amateur
CUT = missed the halfway cut
"T" indicates a tie for a place.
NT = no tournament due to COVID-19 pandemic

=== Summary ===
Tournament	Wins	2nd	3rd	Top-5	Top-10	Top-25	Events	Cuts made
Masters Tournament	0	3	1	5	8	15	20	17
PGA Championship	0	0	1	2	8	14	24	17
U.S. Open	1	0	1	3	5	8	21	10
The Open Championship	0	2	0	3	4	11	23	16
Totals	1	5	3	13	25	48	88	60

- Most consecutive cuts made – 10 (2013 PGA – 2016 Masters)
- Longest streak of top-10s – 3 (2015 Open – 2016 Masters)

== Results in The Players Championship ==
Tournament	2003	2004	2005	2006	2007	2008	2009
The Players Championship	T39	T58	CUT	CUT		CUT	T22

Tournament	2010	2011	2012	2013	2014	2015	2016	2017	2018	2019
The Players Championship	CUT	T45	T51	CUT	T4	CUT	T19	T65	T23	T8

Tournament	2020	2021	2022	2023	2024	2025	2026
The Players Championship	C		CUT	T6	CUT	CUT	T13

Top 10
Did not play

CUT = missed the halfway cut
"T" indicates a tie for a place
C = cancelled after the first round due to the COVID-19 pandemic

== World Golf Championships ==
=== Wins (2) ===
Year	Championship	54 holes	Winning score	Margin	Runner(s)-up
2012	WGC-Cadillac Championship	3 shot deficit	−16 (69-64-69-70=272)	1 stroke	(United States) Bubba Watson
2017	WGC-HSBC Champions	8 shot deficit	−14 (67-68-72-67=274)	2 strokes	(United States) Dustin Johnson, (United States) Brooks Koepka, (Sweden) Henrik Stenson

=== Results timeline ===
Results not in chronological order before 2015.

Tournament	2002	2003	2004	2005	2006	2007	2008	2009	2010	2011	2012	2013	2014	2015	2016	2017	2018	2019
Championship	T46	T28					T15	T20		T42	1	T8	T34	55	T17	T38	T37	
Match Play		R32	R64			QF	R64	R64		R32	R64	R32	R32	T17	T28			R16
Invitational	5	T33				T2	T27	T29	T19	T33	T5	T17	T4	T3	T46	T63		11
Champions										T7	T24	5	T48			1	3	T28

Tournament	2020	2021	2022
Championship		T54	
Match Play	NT^{1}		T26
Invitational		T54	
Champions	NT^{1}	NT^{1}	NT^{1}

^{1}Cancelled due to COVID-19 pandemic

Win
Top 10
Did not play

QF, R16, R32, R64 = Round in which player lost in match play
NT = No tournament
"T" = tied
Note that the HSBC Champions did not become a WGC event until 2009.
Note that the Championship and Invitational were discontinued from 2022.

== Team appearances ==
Amateur

- European Boys' Team Championship (representing England): 1996, 1997
- European Amateur Team Championship (representing England): 1997
- Walker Cup (representing Great Britain & Ireland): 1997
- Jacques Léglise Trophy (representing Great Britain & Ireland): 1996, 1997
- Bonallack Trophy (representing Europe): 1998 (winners)

Professional

- World Cup (representing England): 2002, 2003, 2007, 2011
- Seve Trophy (representing Great Britain & Ireland): 2003 (winners), 2007 (winners)
- Ryder Cup (representing Europe): 2008, 2012 (winners), 2014 (winners), 2016, 2018 (winners), 2023 (winners), 2025 (winners)
- Team Cup (representing Great Britain and Ireland): 2025 (playing captain, winners)

Ryder Cup points record
2008	2012	2014	2016	2018	2023	2025	Total
3	3	4	2	2	1.5	2	17.5

== See also ==
- List of golfers with most European Tour wins
- List of men's major championships winning golfers
