= 2012 WGC-Cadillac Championship =

Coordinates: 25.815°N 80.340°W

Tournament information
- Dates: March 8–11, 2012
- Location: Doral, Florida, U.S.
- Course: Doral Golf Resort & Spa
- Tours: PGA Tour; European Tour

Statistics
- Par: 72
- Length: 7,334 yards (6,706 m)
- Field: 74 players
- Cut: None
- Prize fund: $8,500,000 €6,308,116
- Winner's share: $1,400,000 €1,048,140

Champion
- (England) Justin Rose
- 272 (−16)

The 2012 WGC-Cadillac Championship was a golf tournament played from March 8–11 on the TPC Blue Monster course at Doral Golf Resort & Spa in Doral, Florida, a suburb west of Miami. It was the 13th WGC-Cadillac Championship tournament, and the second of the World Golf Championships events to be staged in 2012.

Justin Rose won his first WGC event, one stroke ahead of runner-up Bubba Watson, the 54-hole leader. Watson rebounded and won his first Masters the following month.

== Course layout ==
The tournament was played on the TPC Blue Monster course.

Hole	1	2	3	4	5	6	7	8	9	Out	10	11	12	13	14	15	16	17	18	In	Total
Yards	529	418	438	236	394	442	454	560	169	3,640	551	402	603	245	460	175	372	419	467	3,694	7,334
Par	5	4	4	3	4	4	4	5	3	36	5	4	5	3	4	3	4	4	4	36	72

== Field ==
Location in the United States

The field consisted of players from the top of the Official World Golf Ranking and the money lists/Order of Merit from the six main professional golf tours. All 74 players that qualified for the tournament played in it. Branden Grace was the only player in the field who was appearing in his first WGC event. Players qualified based on the following qualification rules: Each player is classified according to the first category in which he qualified, but other categories are shown in parentheses.

1. The top 50 players from the Official World Golf Ranking, as of February 27, 2012
Aaron Baddeley (2,3), Bae Sang-moon (2,7), Thomas Bjørn (2,5), Keegan Bradley (2,3,4), Paul Casey (2), K. J. Choi (2,3), Ben Crane (2), Jason Day (2,3), Luke Donald (2,3,5), Jason Dufner (2,3), Simon Dyson (2,5), Rickie Fowler (2), Sergio García (2,5), Bill Haas (2,3,4), Anders Hansen (2,5), Peter Hanson (2,5,6), Freddie Jacobson (2,3), Miguel Ángel Jiménez (5), Dustin Johnson (2,3), Zach Johnson (2), Robert Karlsson (2), Martin Kaymer (2,5), Kim Kyung-tae (2), Matt Kuchar (2,3), Martin Laird (2), Paul Lawrie (2,5,6), Hunter Mahan (2,3,4), Graeme McDowell (2,5), Rory McIlroy (2,4,5,6), Phil Mickelson (2,3,4), Francesco Molinari (2), Geoff Ogilvy (2,3), Louis Oosthuizen (2,5,6), Ian Poulter (2), Álvaro Quirós (2,5), Justin Rose (2,3), Charl Schwartzel (2,5), Adam Scott (2,3), John Senden (2,3), Webb Simpson (2,3), Brandt Snedeker (2,3,4), Kyle Stanley (2,4), Steve Stricker (2,3,4), David Toms (2,3), Bo Van Pelt (2,3), Nick Watney (2,3), Bubba Watson (2,3), Lee Westwood (2,5,6), Mark Wilson (2,3,4), Tiger Woods (2)

2. The top 50 players from the Official World Golf Ranking, as of March 5, 2012
Gonzalo Fernández-Castaño (5)

3. The top 30 players from the final 2011 FedExCup Points List
Jonathan Byrd, Charles Howell III, Chez Reavie, Vijay Singh, Gary Woodland, Yang Yong-eun

4. The top 10 players from the 2012 FedExCup Points List, as of March 5, 2012
Johnson Wagner

5. The top 20 players from the final 2011 European Tour Order of Merit
Darren Clarke, Nicolas Colsaerts, Pablo Larrazábal, Alex Norén

6. The top 10 players from the European Tour Race to Dubai Standings, as of February 27, 2012
Rafa Cabrera-Bello, Retief Goosen, Branden Grace, Jbe' Kruger, Robert Rock

7. The top 2 players from the final 2011 Japan Golf Tour Order of Merit
Tadahiro Takayama

8. The top 2 players from the final 2011 PGA Tour of Australasia Order of Merit
Greg Chalmers, Marcus Fraser

9. The top 2 players from the final 2011 Sunshine Tour Order of Merit
Garth Mulroy, Hennie Otto

10. The top 2 players from the final 2011 Asian Tour Order of Merit
Tetsuji Hiratsuka, Juvic Pagunsan

== Round summaries ==
=== First round ===
Thursday, March 8, 2012

Place	Player	Score	To par
T1	(United States) Jason Dufner	66	−6
T1	(Australia) Adam Scott	66	−6
T3	(Denmark) Thomas Bjørn	68	−4
T3	(South Africa) Charl Schwartzel	68	−4
T5	(Australia) Aaron Baddeley	69	−3
T5	(United States) Keegan Bradley	69	−3
T5	(Spain) Miguel Ángel Jiménez	69	−3
T5	(Philippines) Juvic Pagunsan	69	−3
T5	(Spain) Álvaro Quirós	69	−3
T5	(England) Justin Rose	69	−3
T5	(United States) Kyle Stanley	69	−3
T5	(United States) Steve Stricker	69	−3

=== Second round ===
Friday, March 9, 2012

Place	Player	Score	To par
1	(United States) Bubba Watson	70-62=132	−12
2	(England) Justin Rose	69-64=133	−11
3	(Australia) Adam Scott	66-68=134	−10
4	(Sweden) Peter Hanson	70-65=135	−9
T5	(Denmark) Thomas Bjørn	68-68=136	−8
T5	(United States) Keegan Bradley	69-67=136	−8
T7	(United States) Charles Howell III	70-67=137	−7
T7	(Germany) Martin Kaymer	73-64=137	−7
T7	(South Africa) Charl Schwartzel	68-69=137	−7
T10	(England) Luke Donald	70-68=138	−6
T10	(United States) Jason Dufner	66-72=138	−6
T10	(United States) Zach Johnson	70-68=138	−6
T10	(United States) Kyle Stanley	69-69=138	−6
T10	(United States) Bo Van Pelt	73-65=138	−6

=== Third round ===
Saturday, March 10, 2012

Place	Player	Score	To par
1	(United States) Bubba Watson	70-62-67=199	−17
T2	(United States) Keegan Bradley	69-67-66=202	−14
T2	(England) Justin Rose	69-64-69=202	−14
4	(Sweden) Peter Hanson	70-65-69=204	−12
T5	(United States) Zach Johnson	70-68-67=205	−11
T5	(United States) Matt Kuchar	72-67-66=205	−11
7	(United States) Johnson Wagner	70-69-67=206	−10
T8	(England) Luke Donald	70-68-69=207	−9
T8	(Germany) Martin Kaymer	73-64-70=207	−9
T8	(Northern Ireland) Rory McIlroy	73-69-65=207	−9
T8	(South Africa) Charl Schwartzel	68-69-70=207	−9
T8	(United States) Webb Simpson	75-66-66=207	−9
T8	(United States) Tiger Woods	72-67-68=207	−9

=== Final round ===
Sunday, March 11, 2012

The 54-hole leader Bubba Watson stumbled early in the round and was 3 over par for the front nine, surrendering the lead to Keegan Bradley who was −3 after 7 holes. At one point Bradley led by 2 strokes but he stumbled on the back nine which included a three-putt from 4 feet and a 4 over par finish in the last 4 holes. Rory McIlroy also got into contention with an eagle on the 12th hole and was 1 back of the lead but a bogey on the 14th stopped his momentum. Justin Rose grabbed the lead on the back nine and never relinquished it, though on the final hole, Watson hit a brilliant shot from the rough and around the trees to 8 feet, but missed the ensuing putt which would have resulted in him getting into a playoff with Rose. Tiger Woods withdrew from the tournament after the third round because of an Achilles injury.

Place	Player	Score	To par	Money ($)
1	(England) Justin Rose	69-64-69-70=272	−16	1,400,000
2	(United States) Bubba Watson	70-62-67-74=273	−15	845,000
3	(Northern Ireland) Rory McIlroy	73-69-65-67=274	−14	516,000
T4	(Sweden) Peter Hanson	70-65-69-71=275	−13	362,500
T4	(South Africa) Charl Schwartzel	68-69-70-68=275	−13	362,500
T6	(England) Luke Donald	70-68-69-69=276	−12	260,000
T6	(Australia) John Senden	76-67-68-65=276	−12	260,000
T8	(United States) Keegan Bradley	69-67-66-75=277	−11	165,000
T8	(United States) Matt Kuchar	72-67-66-72=277	−11	165,000
T8	(United States) Steve Stricker	69-70-69-69=277	−11	165,000
T8	(United States) Bo Van Pelt	73-65-70-69=277	−11	165,000

==== Scorecard ====
Final round

Hole	1	2	3	4	5	6	7	8	9	10	11	12	13	14	15	16	17	18
Par	5	4	4	3	4	4	4	5	3	5	4	5	3	4	3	4	4	4
(England) Rose	−15	−15	−15	−16	−16	−15	−15	−15	−15	−16	−16	−16	−16	−17	−17	−17	−17	−16
(United States) Watson	−18	−18	−17	−16	−15	−15	−15	−15	−14	−14	−15	−16	−15	−15	−15	−15	−15	−15
(Northern Ireland) McIlroy	−10	−10	−10	−10	−10	−10	−11	−12	−12	−13	−13	−15	−15	−14	−14	−15	−15	−14
(Sweden) Hanson	−12	−12	−12	−12	−13	−12	−12	−13	−13	−14	−14	−14	−13	−12	−12	−13	−13	−13
(South Africa) Schwartzel	−11	−11	−11	−11	−12	−12	−12	−12	−11	−11	−11	−12	−12	−13	−14	−14	−14	−13
(United States) Bradley	−16	−16	−15	−15	−16	−16	−17	−16	−16	−15	−15	−15	−15	−15	−14	−14	−13	−11

Cumulative tournament scores, relative to par
