= 2017 WGC-HSBC Champions =

Coordinates: 31.109°N 121.216°E

Tournament information
- Dates: 26–29 October 2017
- Location: Shanghai, China
- Course: Sheshan Golf Club
- Tour(s): Asian Tour; European Tour; PGA Tour

Statistics
- Par: 72
- Length: 7,261 yards (6,639 m)
- Field: 78 players
- Cut: None
- Prize fund: $9,750,000
- Winner's share: $1,660,000

Champion
- (England) Justin Rose
- 274 (−14)

Location in China

The 2017 WGC-HSBC Champions was a golf tournament played from 26–29 October 2017 at the Sheshan Golf Club in Shanghai, China. It was the ninth WGC-HSBC Champions tournament, and the fourth of four World Golf Championships events held in the 2017 calendar year.

Justin Rose won his first HSBC Champions and second World Golf Championship.

== Field ==
The following is a list of players who qualified for the 2017 WGC-HSBC Champions. The criteria are towards the leaders in points lists rather than tournament winners. Players who qualify from multiple categories will be listed in the first category in which they are eligible with the other qualifying categories in parentheses next to the player's name.

1. Winners of the four major championships and The Players Championship

Kim Si-woo (3), Brooks Koepka (3,4)

- Sergio García (3,4,5), Jordan Spieth (3,4), and Justin Thomas (3,4) did not play.

2. Winners of the previous four World Golf Championships

Dustin Johnson (3,4), Hideki Matsuyama (3,4)

3. Top 50 from the OWGR on 9 October

Daniel Berger (4), Rafa Cabrera-Bello (5), Paul Casey (4), Jason Day (4), Tony Finau (4), Ross Fisher (5), Matt Fitzpatrick (5), Tommy Fleetwood (5), Branden Grace, Bill Haas, Adam Hadwin (4), Brian Harman (4), Tyrrell Hatton (5), Russell Henley (4), Matt Kuchar (4), Marc Leishman (4), Phil Mickelson, Francesco Molinari (5), Alex Norén (5), Pat Perez (4), Thomas Pieters (5), Jon Rahm (4,5), Patrick Reed (4,5), Justin Rose (4,5), Xander Schauffele (4), Charl Schwartzel (5), Adam Scott, Henrik Stenson (5), Jhonattan Vegas (4), Bernd Wiesberger (5)

- Kevin Chappell (4), Jason Dufner (4), Rickie Fowler (4), Charley Hoffman (4), Zach Johnson, Kevin Kisner (4), Rory McIlroy (5), Ryan Moore, Louis Oosthuizen, Webb Simpson (4), Brandt Snedeker, Brendan Steele, and Gary Woodland (4) did not play.

4. Top 30 from the final 2017 FedEx Cup points list (if there are less than five available players, players beyond 30th will be selected to increase the number to five)

Patrick Cantlay, Charles Howell III, Chez Reavie, Kyle Stanley, Hudson Swafford

- Mackenzie Hughes did not play.

5. Top 30 from the Race to Dubai as of 16 October

Kiradech Aphibarnrat, Paul Dunne, Ryan Fox, Alexander Lévy, Li Haotong, Mike Lorenzo-Vera, Thorbjørn Olesen, Richie Ramsay, Jordan Smith, Matthew Southgate, Hideto Tanihara, Peter Uihlein, Fabrizio Zanotti

- Lee Westwood did not play.

6. The leading four available players from the Asian Tour Order of Merit as of 16 October

Shiv Chawrasia, Gavin Green, Scott Hend, David Lipsky

7. The leading two available players from the Japan Golf Tour Order of Merit as of 16 October

Chan Kim, Shugo Imahira

- Yuta Ikeda, Satoshi Kodaira, and Yūsaku Miyazato did not play.

8. The leading two available players from the final 2016 PGA Tour of Australasia Order of Merit

Matthew Griffin, Michael Hendry

9. The leading two available players from the final 2016 Sunshine Tour Order of Merit

Richard Sterne, Brandon Stone

- Dean Burmester did not play.

10. Six players from China

Cao Yi, Dou Zecheng, Liang Wenchong, Liu Yanwei, Wu Ashun, Zhang Xinjun

11. Alternates, if needed to fill the field of 78 players

- The next available player on the Orders of Merit of the Asian Tour, Japan Golf Tour, Sunshine Tour, and PGA Tour of Australasia, ranked in order of their position in the OWGR as of 9 October
- Next available player, not otherwise exempt, from Race to Dubai as of 16 October, OWGR as of 9 October, FedEx Cup list:
1. Ryu Hyun-woo (Japan Golf Tour; Shingo Katayama did not play)
2. Haydn Porteous (Sunshine Tour; Darren Fichardt did not play)
3. Phachara Khongwatmai (Asian Tour)
4. Ashley Hall (PGA Tour of Australasia)
5. Graeme Storm (Race to Dubai)
6. Wesley Bryan (OWGR; Jimmy Walker did not play)
7. Lucas Glover (FedEx Cup; Billy Horschel did not play)
8. Daisuke Kataoka (Japan Golf Tour)
9. Andrew Dodt (PGA Tour of Australasia)
10. Poom Saksansin (Asian Tour)

== Round summaries ==
=== First round ===
Thursday, 26 October 2017

Brooks Koepka shot an 8-under-par 64 to take a one-stroke lead over Kiradech Aphibarnrat and Gavin Green.

Place	Player	Score	To par
1	(United States) Brooks Koepka	64	−8
T2	(Thailand) Kiradech Aphibarnrat	65	−7
T2	(Malaysia) Gavin Green	65	−7
T4	(South Africa) Haydn Porteous	66	−6
T4	(United States) Patrick Reed	66	−6
T6	(Republic of Ireland) Paul Dunne	67	−5
T6	(United States) Tony Finau	67	−5
T6	(United States) Matt Kuchar	67	−5
T6	(England) Justin Rose	67	−5
T6	(China) Wu Ashun	67	−5

=== Second round ===
Friday, 27 October 2017

Dustin Johnson shot a 9-under-par 63 to take a one-stroke lead over first-round leader Brooks Koepka.

Place	Player	Score	To par
1	(United States) Dustin Johnson	68-63=131	−13
2	(United States) Brooks Koepka	64-68=132	−12
T3	(Thailand) Kiradech Aphibarnrat	65-70=135	−9
T3	(England) Justin Rose	67-68=135	−9
5	(United States) Patrick Reed	66-70=136	−8
T6	(England) Matt Fitzpatrick	68-69=137	−7
T6	(United States) Brian Harman	68-69=137	−7
T6	(United States) Matt Kuchar	67-70=137	−7
T6	(Sweden) Henrik Stenson	68-69=137	−7
T10	(Spain) Rafa Cabrera-Bello	68-70=138	−6
T10	(England) Tyrrell Hatton	68-70=138	−6

=== Third round ===
Saturday, 28 October 2017

Dustin Johnson shot a 4-under-par 68 to open a 6-shot lead over Brooks Koepka who was hurt by a triple-bogey on the par-5 8th hole.

Place	Player	Score	To par
1	(United States) Dustin Johnson	68-63-68=199	−17
2	(United States) Brooks Koepka	64-68-73=205	−11
3	(Sweden) Henrik Stenson	68-69-69=206	−10
T4	(United States) Brian Harman	68-69-70=207	−9
T4	(England) Justin Rose	67-68-72=207	−9
T6	(Spain) Rafa Cabrera-Bello	68-70-70=208	−8
T6	(United States) Kyle Stanley	71-68-69=208	−8
T6	(United States) Peter Uihlein	72-67-69=208	−8
T9	(England) Matt Fitzpatrick	68-69-72=209	−7
T9	(England) Tyrrell Hatton	68-70-71=209	−7
T9	(United States) Matt Kuchar	67-70-72=209	−7

=== Final round ===
Sunday, 29 October 2017

Justin Rose overcame an eight-stroke deficit to win by two strokes over third-round leader Dustin Johnson, as well as Brooks Koepka and Henrik Stenson. Rose shot a 5-under-par 67, tied for the low round with Phil Mickelson, while Johnson shot a 5-over-par 77 in windy conditions.

Place	Player	Score	To par	Prize money (US$)
1	(England) Justin Rose	67-68-72-67=274	−14	1,660,000
T2	(United States) Dustin Johnson	68-63-68-77=276	−12	679,667
T2	(United States) Brooks Koepka	64-68-73-71=276	−12	679,667
T2	(Sweden) Henrik Stenson	68-69-69-70=276	−12	679,667
T5	(Spain) Rafa Cabrera-Bello	68-70-70-72=280	−8	288,000
T5	(United States) Kyle Stanley	71-68-69-72=280	−8	288,000
T5	(United States) Peter Uihlein	72-67-69-72=280	−8	288,000
8	(United States) Brian Harman	68-69-70-74=281	−7	210,000
T9	(England) Matt Fitzpatrick	68-69-72-73=282	−6	176,000
T9	(Austria) Bernd Wiesberger	71-70-70-71=282	−6	176,000

==== Scorecard ====
Birdie	Bogey	Double bogey

Hole	1	2	3	4	5	6	7	8	9	10	11	12	13	14	15	16	17	18
Par	4	5	4	3	4	3	4	5	4	4	4	3	4	5	4	4	3	5
(England) Rose	−9	−10	−11	−11	−11	−10	−11	−10	−9	−9	−10	−10	−11	−12	−12	−13	−14	−14
(United States) Johnson	−16	−15	−15	−15	−15	−15	−15	−15	−15	−15	−15	−14	−14	−14	−13	−12	−12	−12
(United States) Koepka	−11	−11	−10	−9	−9	−9	−10	−10	−10	−11	−12	−12	−12	−13	−11	−11	−11	−12
(Sweden) Stenson	−10	−10	−10	−10	−10	−11	−12	−12	−12	−12	−11	−12	−12	−12	−12	−13	−12	−12

Cumulative tournament scores, relative to par
