= Match play =

Scoring system for golf

Match play is a scoring system for golf in which a player, or team, earns a point for each hole in which they have bested their opponents; as opposed to stroke play, in which the total number of strokes is counted over one or more rounds of 18 holes. In match play the winner is the player, or team, with the most points at the end of play.

Although most professional tournaments are played using the stroke play scoring system, there are, or have been, some exceptions, for example the now defunct WGC Match Play and the Volvo World Match Play Championship, and most team events, for example the Ryder Cup and Presidents Cup, all of which are in match play format.

== Scoring system ==
Unlike stroke play, in which the unit of scoring is the total number of strokes taken over one or more rounds of golf, match play scoring consists of individual holes won, halved or lost. On each hole, the most that can be gained is one point. Golfers play as normal, counting the strokes taken on a given hole. The golfer with the lowest score on a given hole receives one point. If the golfers tie, then the hole is tied (or halved). For example, in an 18-hole match, the first hole is a par-4 and Player A scores a 3 (birdie) and Player B scores a 4 (par); Player A is now 1-up with 17 to play. In the same match on the second hole, a par-5, Player A takes 8 strokes and Player B takes 5 (par); Player B wins the hole and the match is now tied (or "all square") with 16 to play. On the third hole, a par-3, both players take 3 strokes and the match is tied with 15 holes to play. Once a player is "up" more holes than there are holes remaining to play the match is over. For example, if after 12 holes Player A is 7-up with six left to play, Player A is said to have won the match "7 and 6".

A team that is leading by x holes with x holes remaining is said to be "dormie-x" or simply "dormie", meaning that they need one more halved hole to win the match (or that the other team must win all the remaining holes in order to tie the match). For example, if Player A is 2-up with 2 to play, he is dormie; the worst outcome for Player A at that point is a tie, unless the format calls for extra holes to determine a winner.

In a tournament event where the score is tied after the last hole (usually 18 or 36), the players will play on until a player wins a hole (sudden death). In the Ryder Cup and other similar team events, the match is not finished this way, and the teams each receive a half point. In such events there are points accumulated over several days, playing different formats, and the total determines the winning team.

== Scoring using handicaps ==
Scoring match play using handicaps is not done exactly the same way it is done in a stroke play event. In 18-hole stroke play where Player A is a 10 handicap and Player B is a 19 handicap, one stroke is deducted from Player A's score on the ten hardest holes (by handicap rating on scorecard). For Player B, two strokes are deducted on the hardest hole and one stroke deducted on the other 17 holes. In match play, Player A would play as "scratch" (zero handicap) and Player B would deduct one stroke on the nine hardest holes. In other words, the 10 handicap becomes zero and the 19 handicap becomes nine.

In team match play competition, all player handicaps are compared to the lowest of the handicaps. Consider an example where Team A consists of Player A1 (a 10 handicap) and Player A2 (a 15 handicap), and where Team B consists of Player B1 (a 19 handicap) and Player B2 (a 30 handicap). In this example, Player A1 plays as "scratch" (zero handicap), A2 deducts one stroke on the five hardest holes, B1 deducts one stroke on the nine hardest holes, and B2 deducts two strokes on the two hardest holes and one stroke on the other 16 holes.

Some competitions may restrict the handicap differential between playing partners. This is not required by the USGA but may be used by local clubs and tournaments. Using the above team play example and if a local rule limits any player to having a handicap that is at most 8 strokes higher than their partner, Player B2's handicap would be adjusted to 27 for the purposes of that competition (Player B1's handicap of 19 + 8 = 27).

== Tournaments featuring match play ==
Currently, there are few professional tournaments that use match play. They include the biennial Ryder Cup played by two teams, one representing the USA and the other representing Europe; the biennial Presidents Cup for teams representing the US and International (non-European) players; and the older now defunct Volvo World Match Play Championship, an invitational event which that was last played as a part of the European Tour. The PGA Championship, one of the majors, used match play for its first 39 editions (1916–1957), but changed to stroke play 68 years ago in 1958.

Women's professional golf had no event directly comparable to the Accenture Championship until the HSBC Women's World Match Play Championship was introduced in 2005. After it was canceled in 2007, the LPGA was without a match play event until the Sybase Match Play Championship was played from 2010 to 2012. Women's golf also has the biennial Solheim Cup staged between two teams, one including USA-born players and one including players born in Europe. In 2014, a new women's match play tournament began, the International Crown – a biennial match play competition featuring teams from eight countries. From 2005 to 2008, women's golf held the Lexus Cup, an event pitting an International team against an Asian team.

The USGA championships – Amateur, Junior Amateur, Mid-Amateur, Senior Amateur, and team (four-ball) for both men and women – are conducted with two rounds of stroke play to cut the field to 64 (individual) or 32 (teams), and then proceed to a single-elimination match play tournament. All elimination matches are 18 holes except for the final in individual competitions, which is 36 holes.

The European Tour and PGA Tour Australasia co-sanction a Perth (Australia) tournament that in 2017 adopts a match play format. It is conducted with three rounds of stroke play, with two cuts—one to 65 at the end of the second round, and one to 24 at the end of the third round, then proceeds on the final day to a single-elimination match play tournament with the top eight exempt from the first round. All elimination matches are six holes, with a tie-breaker hole played twice. The first hole will be a standard par-3, and the second time around closest to pin will end the round.

The European Tour also has the GolfSixes, which uses 16 pairs of players, by country, and uses a round robin grouping of four groups of four, with each group playing three matches with a similar format to the elimination matches in Perth, and the results determine second-day matches. Each group will play a maximum of 36 holes (six matches).

== Strategy ==
Golfers can employ a slightly different strategy during a match play event since the scoring is different. The situation in the match and the outcome of each shot already played on a hole will both be taken into account. On the whole, match play encourages more aggressive play, especially at the professional level, where a par is not usually good enough to win a hole. Since a very poor result for a hole is no worse than a slightly-below-average result when playing against an opponent with an average score, it often makes sense to accept the higher risk connected with aggressive tactics. However, in some circumstances players will be especially cautious in match play. For instance, a player may choose to play more conservatively if the opponent has hit a poor tee shot or is otherwise under pressure to compensate for a poor start on a particular hole, reasoning that there is a good chance to win the hole with an average result.

== Alternative forms of match play ==
Forms of match play that allow three or more players to compete individually include "Irish match play", "Rowan match play" and skins.

Another form is "medal match play", which combines the head-to-head match play style with medal or stroke play scores. Each match between two players or teams of players is determined by the 18-hole medal score instead of on a hole-by-hole basis. The advantage is that ties in group or pool play can be broken by overall medal scores. This format was used in the Piccadilly Medal, the Liggett & Myers Open Match Play Championship, the 1986 Seiko-Tucson Match Play Championship, the Dunhill Cup, World Golf Final, and starting in 2018, albeit with a nine-hole medal score, the Belgian Knockout.

== See also ==
- Golf glossary
