= Belek =

- Neighbourhood
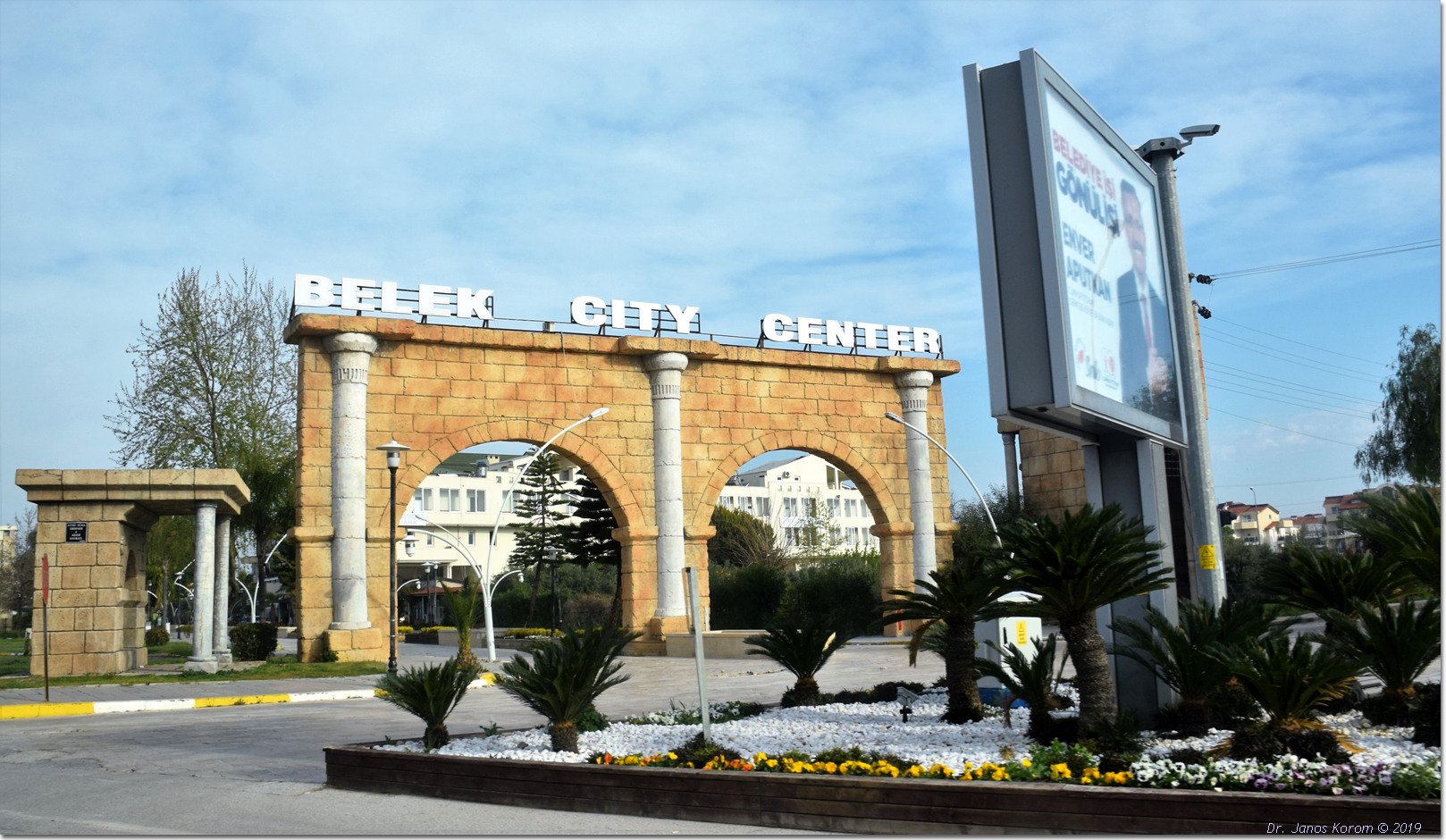

- Location within Turkey
- Coordinates: 36°51′50″N 31°03′30″E
- Country: Turkey
- Province: Antalya
- District: Serik
- Population (2022): 9,102
- Time zone: UTC+3 (TRT)
- Area code: 0242
- Website: http://www.serik.gov.tr/serik-turizm/

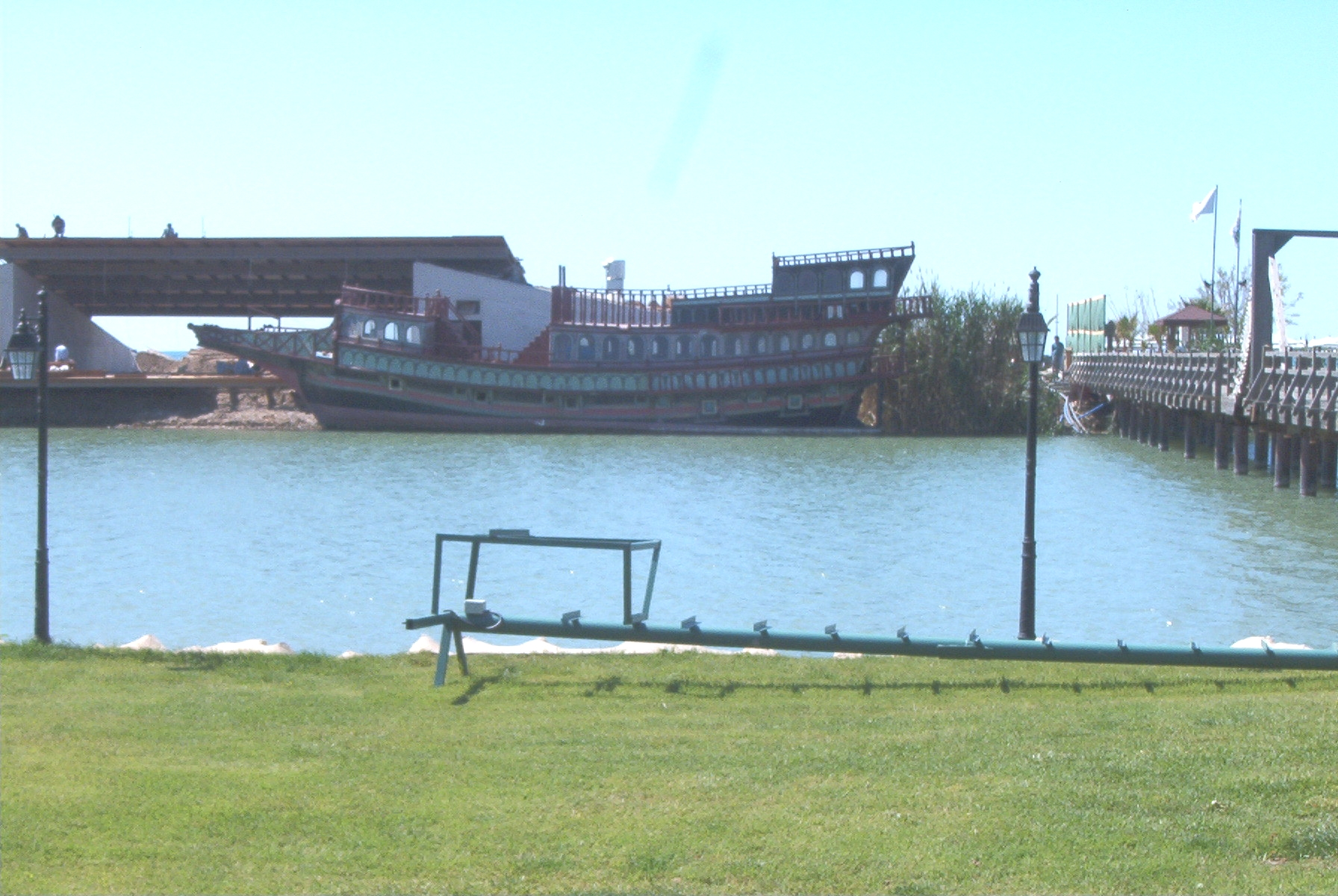
Replica of a ship at the beach of Belek

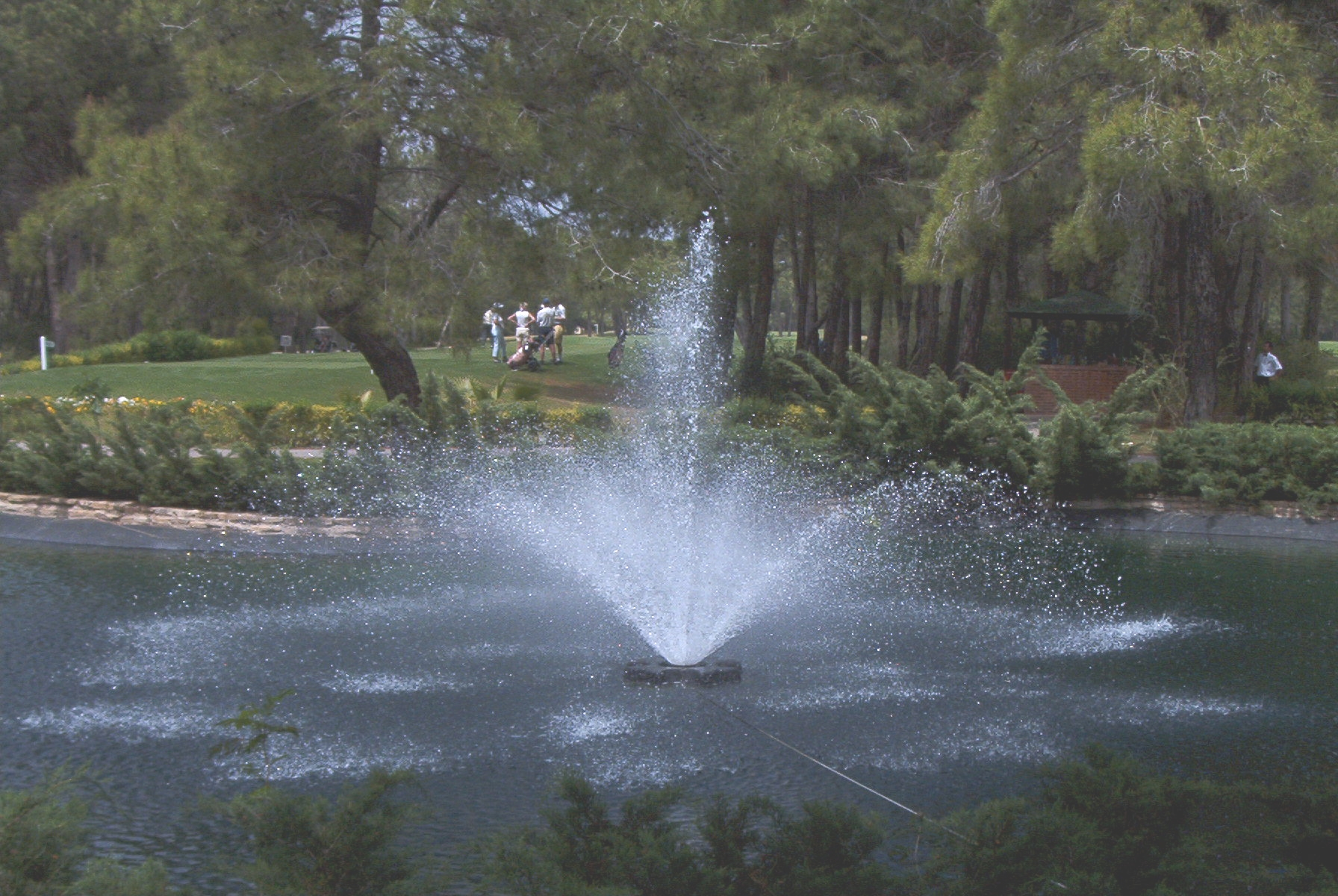
Golf course Gloria in Belek

Belek is a neighbourhood in the Serik district in Turkey's Antalya Province. As of 2022, it had a population of 9,102. Before the 2013 Turkish local government reorganization, it was a town (Belde).

Belek is one of the centers of Turkey's tourism industry and is home to more than thirty four-star and five-star hotels and many other accommodation services and entertainment facilities.

The town and the surrounding area are famous for their spas and mineral waters received from seven springs.

Belek was awarded the Best Golf Region of the Year in Europe by the International Association of Golf Tour Operators (IAGTO) in 2008. In 2012 it hosted the Turkish Airlines World Golf Final and in 2013 it hosted the Turkish Airlines Open. Belek also hosts the Antalya Open, the only professional tennis tournament currently held in Turkey.

== Town ==
In the center of town, a mosque stands alongside statues and a waterfall leading to extensive shopping in the tree lined boulevards. This area is key to Turkey's overall tourism plans having already benefited from substantial investment by the Turkish Tourism Ministry. Turkey is beginning to rival the Algarve for the numbers of golfing tourists annually.
